= Electoral history of Strom Thurmond =

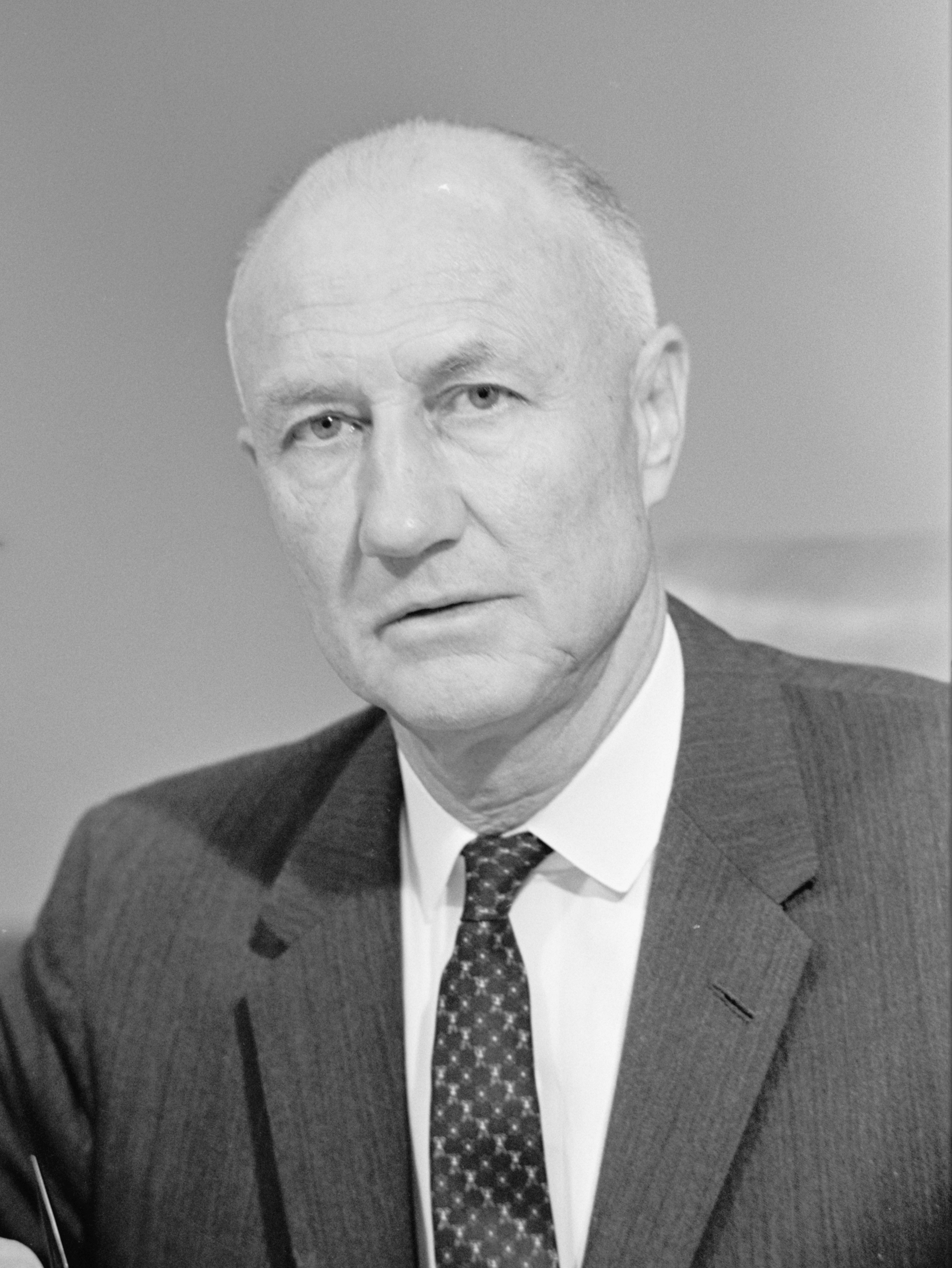
James Strom Thurmond c. 1961

Strom Thurmond served as the 103rd governor of South Carolina (1947–1951), United States senator from South Carolina (1954–1956, 1956–2003; Democrat until 1964 and Republican after), 1948 States' Rights Democrats presidential nominee and President pro tempore of the United States Senate (1981–1987, 1995–2001 and 2001).

Thurmond's over 70 years electoral career begun from successful election for the county attorney in 1930 and continued until 2003.

== Governor of South Carolina ==
Democratic gubernatorial primary in South Carolina, 1946
| Party | Candidate | Votes | % |
|---|---|---|---|
| Democratic | Strom Thurmond | 96,691 | 33.43 |
| Democratic | James C. McLeod | 83,464 | 28.86 |
| Democratic | Ransome Judson Williams (incumbent) | 35,813 | 12.38 |
| Democratic | John C. Taylor | 22,447 | 7.76 |
| Democratic | Dell O'Neall | 16,574 | 5.73 |
| Democratic | John D. Long | 16,503 | 5.71 |
| Democratic | Carl B. Epps | 5,189 | 1.79 |
| Democratic | Marcus A. Stone | 4,353 | 1.51 |
| Democratic | A. L. Wood | 3,040 | 1.05 |
| Democratic | A. J. Beattie | 2,889 | 1.00 |
| Democratic | Roger W. Scott | 2,251 | 0.78 |
| Total votes | | 289,214 | 100.00 |

Democratic gubernatorial runoff primary in South Carolina, 1946
| Party | Candidate | Votes | % |
|---|---|---|---|
| Democratic | Strom Thurmond | 144,420 | 56.95 |
| Democratic | James C. McLeod | 109,169 | 43.05 |
| Total votes | | 253,589 | 100.0 |

1946 South Carolina gubernatorial election
| Party | Candidate | Votes | % |
|---|---|---|---|
| Democratic | Strom Thurmond | 26,520 | 100.00 |
| Total votes | | 26,520 | 100.0 |
| Democratic hold | | | |

== United States presidential elections ==
1948 United States presidential election:

- Harry S. Truman/Alben W. Barkley (D) – 24,179,347 (49.6%) and 303 electoral votes (57.06%, 28 states carried)
- Thomas E. Dewey/Earl Warren (R) – 21,991,292 (45.1%) and 189 electoral votes (35.59%, 16 states carried)
- Strom Thurmond/Fielding L. Wright (Dixiecrat) – 1,175,930 (2.4%) and 39 electoral votes (7.35%, 4 states carried)
- Henry A. Wallace/Glen H. Taylor (Progressive) – 1,157,328 (2.4%)
- Norman Thomas/Tucker P. Smith (Socialist) – 139,569 (0.3%)
- Claude Watson/Dale Learn (Prohibition) – 103,708 (0.2%)
- Others – 46,361 (0.1%)

1960 United States presidential election:

- John F. Kennedy/Lyndon B. Johnson (D) – 34,220,984 (49.7%) and 303 electoral votes (56.43%, 22 states carried)
- Richard Nixon/Henry Cabot Lodge Jr. (R) – 34,108,157 (49.6%) and 219 electoral votes (40.78%, 26 states carried)
- Harry F. Byrd/Strom Thurmond (I) – 286,359 (0.4%) and 14 electoral votes (2.61%, 2 states carried)
- Harry F. Byrd/Barry Goldwater (I) – 1 electoral vote (0.19%, Oklahoma faithless elector)
- Orval E. Faubus/John G. Crommelin (State's Rights) – 44,984 (0.1%)
- Charles L. Sullivan/Merritt Curtis (Constitution) – 18,162 (0.0%)
- Others – 216,982 (0.3%)

== United States Senate ==
Democratic primary for the United States Senate from South Carolina, 1950
| Party | Candidate | Votes | % |
|---|---|---|---|
| Democratic | Olin D. Johnston (incumbent) | 186,180 | 53.95 |
| Democratic | Strom Thurmond | 158,904 | 46.05 |
| Total votes | | 345,084 | 100.0 |

1954 United States Senate election in South Carolina
| Party | Candidate | Votes | % |
|---|---|---|---|
| Independent Democrat | Strom Thurmond (write-in) | 143,444 | 63.13 |
| Democratic | Edgar A. Brown | 83,525 | 36.76 |
| Democratic | Marcus A. Stone (write-in) | 240 | 0.11 |
| Total votes | | 227,209 | 100.0 |

1956 United States Senate special election in South Carolina
| Party | Candidate | Votes | % |
|---|---|---|---|
| Democratic | Strom Thurmond (incumbent) | 245,371 | 100.00 |
| Total votes | | 245,371 | 100.0 |

1960 United States Senate election in South Carolina
| Party | Candidate | Votes | % |
|---|---|---|---|
| Democratic | Strom Thurmond (incumbent) | 330,167 | 99.97 |
| Write-in | | 102 | 0.03 |
| Total votes | | 330,269 | 100.0 |

1966 United States Senate election in South Carolina
| Party | Candidate | Votes | % |
|---|---|---|---|
| Republican | Strom Thurmond (incumbent) | 271,297 | 62.19 |
| Democratic | Bradley Morrah Jr. | 164,955 | 37.81 |
| Total votes | | 436,252 | 100.0 |

1972 United States Senate election in South Carolina
| Party | Candidate | Votes | % |
|---|---|---|---|
| Republican | Strom Thurmond (incumbent) | 415,806 | 63.29 |
| Democratic | Nick Ziegler | 241,056 | 36.69 |
| Write-in | | 172 | 0.03 |
| Total votes | | 657,034 | 100.0 |

1978 United States Senate election in South Carolina
| Party | Candidate | Votes | % |
|---|---|---|---|
| Republican | Strom Thurmond (incumbent) | 351,917 | 55.68 |
| Democratic | Charles D. Ravenel | 280,146 | 44.32 |
| Total votes | | 632,063 | 100.0 |

1984 United States Senate election in South Carolina
Primary election
| Party | Candidate | Votes | % |
|---|---|---|---|
| Republican | Strom Thurmond (incumbent) | 44,662 | 94.31 |
| Republican | Bob Cunningham | 2,693 | 5.69 |
| Total votes | | 47,355 | 100.00 |
General election
| Republican | Strom Thurmond (incumbent) | 644,815 | 66.61 |
| Democratic | Melvin Purvis | 306,982 | 31.81 |
| Libertarian | Stephen Davis | 13,323 | 1.38 |
| Total votes | | 965,120 | 100.00 |

1990 United States Senate election in South Carolina
| Party | Candidate | Votes | % |
|---|---|---|---|
| Republican | Strom Thurmond (incumbent) | 482,032 | 64.21 |
| Democratic | Bob Cunningham | 244,112 | 32.52 |
| Libertarian | William H. Griffin | 13,805 | 1.84 |
| American | Marion C. Metts | 10,317 | 1.37 |
| Write-in | | 450 | 0.06 |
| Total votes | | 750,716 | 100.00 |

1996 United States Senate election in South Carolina
Primary election
| Party | Candidate | Votes | % |
|---|---|---|---|
| Republican | Strom Thurmond (incumbent) | 132,145 | 60.62 |
| Republican | Harold G. Worley | 65,666 | 30.12 |
| Republican | Charlie Thompson | 20,185 | 9.26 |
| Total votes | | 217,996 | 100.00 |
General election
| Republican | Strom Thurmond (incumbent) | 620,326 | 53.38 |
| Democratic | Elliott S. Close | 511,226 | 43.99 |
| Libertarian | Richard T. Quillian | 12,994 | 1.12 |
| Reform | Peter J. Ashy | 9,741 | 0.84 |
| Natural Law | Annette C. Estes | 7,697 | 0.66 |
| Write-in | | 141 | 0.01 |
| Total votes | | 965,120 | 100.00 |

== Almanac ==
United States Congressional Service
| Years | Congress | Chamber | Senate Majority | Senate President | Constituency |
|---|---|---|---|---|---|
| 1953–55 | 83rd | U.S. Senate | Republican | Richard Nixon | South Carolina |
| 1955–57 | 84th | U.S. Senate | Democratic | Richard Nixon | South Carolina |
| 1957–59 | 85th | U.S. Senate | Democratic | Richard Nixon | South Carolina |
| 1959–61 | 86th | U.S. Senate | Democratic | Richard Nixon | South Carolina |
| 1961–63 | 87th | U.S. Senate | Democratic | Lyndon B. Johnson | South Carolina |
| 1963–65 | 88th | U.S. Senate | Democratic | Vacant | South Carolina |
| 1965–67 | 89th | U.S. Senate | Democratic | Hubert Humphrey | South Carolina |
| 1967–69 | 90th | U.S. Senate | Democratic | Hubert Humphrey | South Carolina |
| 1969–71 | 91st | U.S. Senate | Democratic | Spiro Agnew | South Carolina |
| 1971–73 | 92nd | U.S. Senate | Democratic | Spiro Agnew | South Carolina |
| 1973–75 | 93rd | U.S. Senate | Democratic | Spiro Agnew (until October 10, 1973); Vacant (October 10–December 6, 1973); Gerald Ford (December 6, 1973–August 9, 1974); Vacant (August 9–December 19, 1974); Nelson Rockefeller (from December 19, 1974) | South Carolina |
| 1975–77 | 94th | U.S. Senate | Democratic | Nelson Rockefeller | South Carolina |
| 1977–79 | 95th | U.S. Senate | Democratic | Walter Mondale | South Carolina |
| 1979–81 | 96th | U.S. Senate | Democratic | Walter Mondale | South Carolina |
| 1981–83 | 97th | U.S. Senate | Republican | George H. W. Bush | South Carolina |
| 1983–85 | 98th | U.S. Senate | Republican | George H. W. Bush | South Carolina |
| 1985–87 | 99th | U.S. Senate | Republican | George H. W. Bush | South Carolina |
| 1987–89 | 100th | U.S. Senate | Democratic | George H. W. Bush | South Carolina |
| 1989–91 | 101st | U.S. Senate | Democratic | Dan Quayle | South Carolina |
| 1991–93 | 102nd | U.S. Senate | Democratic | Dan Quayle | South Carolina |
| 1993–95 | 103rd | U.S. Senate | Democratic | Al Gore | South Carolina |
| 1995–97 | 104th | U.S. Senate | Republican | Al Gore | South Carolina |
| 1997–99 | 105th | U.S. Senate | Republican | Al Gore | South Carolina |
| 1999–2001 | 106th | U.S. Senate | Republican | Al Gore | South Carolina |
| 2001–2003 | 107th | U.S. Senate | Democratic (until January 20, 2001); Republican (January 20 – June 6, 2001); Democratic (from June 6, 2001) | Dick Cheney | South Carolina |

== President pro tempore elections ==
President pro tempore of the United States Senate, 1981
| Party | Candidate | Votes | % |
|---|---|---|---|
| Republican | Strom Thurmond | 53 | 53.54 |
| Democratic | John C. Stennis | 46 | 46.47 |
| Total votes | | 100 | 100.00 |

President pro tempore of the United States Senate, 1983
| Party | Candidate | Votes | % |
|---|---|---|---|
| Republican | Strom Thurmond (incumbent) | 54 | 54.00 |
| Democratic | John C. Stennis | 46 | 46.00 |
| Total votes | | 100 | 100.00 |

President pro tempore of the United States Senate, 1985
| Party | Candidate | Votes | % |
|---|---|---|---|
| Republican | Strom Thurmond (incumbent) | 53 | 53.00 |
| Democratic | John C. Stennis | 47 | 47.00 |
| Total votes | | 100 | 100.00 |

President pro tempore of the United States Senate, 1987
| Party | Candidate | Votes | % |
|---|---|---|---|
| Democratic | John C. Stennis | 55 | 55.00 |
| Republican | Strom Thurmond (incumbent) | 45 | 45.00 |
| Total votes | | 100 | 100.00 |

President pro tempore of the United States Senate, 1989
| Party | Candidate | Votes | % |
|---|---|---|---|
| Democratic | Robert Byrd | 55 | 55.00 |
| Republican | Strom Thurmond | 45 | 45.00 |
| Total votes | | 100 | 100.00 |

President pro tempore of the United States Senate, 1991
| Party | Candidate | Votes | % |
|---|---|---|---|
| Democratic | Robert Byrd (incumbent) | 56 | 56.00 |
| Republican | Strom Thurmond | 44 | 44.00 |
| Total votes | | 100 | 100.00 |

President pro tempore of the United States Senate, 1993
| Party | Candidate | Votes | % |
|---|---|---|---|
| Democratic | Robert Byrd (incumbent) | 57 | 57.00 |
| Republican | Strom Thurmond | 43 | 43.00 |
| Total votes | | 100 | 100.00 |

President pro tempore of the United States Senate, 1995
| Party | Candidate | Votes | % |
|---|---|---|---|
| Republican | Strom Thurmond | 52 | 52.00 |
| Democratic | Robert Byrd (incumbent) | 48 | 48.00 |
| Total votes | | 100 | 100.00 |

President pro tempore of the United States Senate, 1997
| Party | Candidate | Votes | % |
|---|---|---|---|
| Republican | Strom Thurmond (incumbent) | 55 | 55.00 |
| Democratic | Robert Byrd | 45 | 45.00 |
| Total votes | | 100 | 100.00 |

President pro tempore of the United States Senate, 1999
| Party | Candidate | Votes | % |
|---|---|---|---|
| Republican | Strom Thurmond (incumbent) | 55 | 55.00 |
| Democratic | Robert Byrd | 45 | 45.00 |
| Total votes | | 100 | 100.00 |

President pro tempore of the United States Senate, January 3, 2001
| Party | Candidate | Votes | % |
|---|---|---|---|
| Democratic | Robert Byrd | 51 | 51.00 |
| Republican | Strom Thurmond (incumbent) | 50 | 50.00 |
| Total votes | | 101 | 100.00 |

President pro tempore of the United States Senate, January 20, 2001
| Party | Candidate | Votes | % |
|---|---|---|---|
| Republican | Strom Thurmond | 51 | 51.00 |
| Democratic | Robert Byrd (incumbent) | 50 | 50.00 |
| Total votes | | 101 | 100.00 |

President pro tempore of the United States Senate, June 6, 2001
| Party | Candidate | Votes | % |
|---|---|---|---|
| Democratic | Robert Byrd | 51 | 45.00 |
| Republican | Strom Thurmond (incumbent) | 49 | 49.00 |
| Total votes | | 100 | 100.00 |

President pro tempore emeritus of the United States Senate, June 6, 2001
| Party | Candidate | Votes | % |
|---|---|---|---|
| Republican | Strom Thurmond | 100 | 100.00 |
| Total votes | | 100 | 100.00 |
