= BCSO =

The abbreviation BCSO may refer to:

- Baker County Sheriff's Office (Florida)
- Baltimore County Sheriff's Office (Maryland)
- Bernalillo County Sheriff's Office
- Bexar County Sheriff's Office
- Boone County Sheriff's Office (Kentucky)
- Bradley County Sheriff's Office
- Brazoria County Sheriff's Office
- Broome County Sheriff's Office
- Broward County Sheriff's Office
- Berkeley County Sheriff's Office, see List of law enforcement agencies in South Carolina § County agencies
