= Orangeburg Massacre =

1968 shooting of student protesters

- Part of the civil rights movement in South Carolina
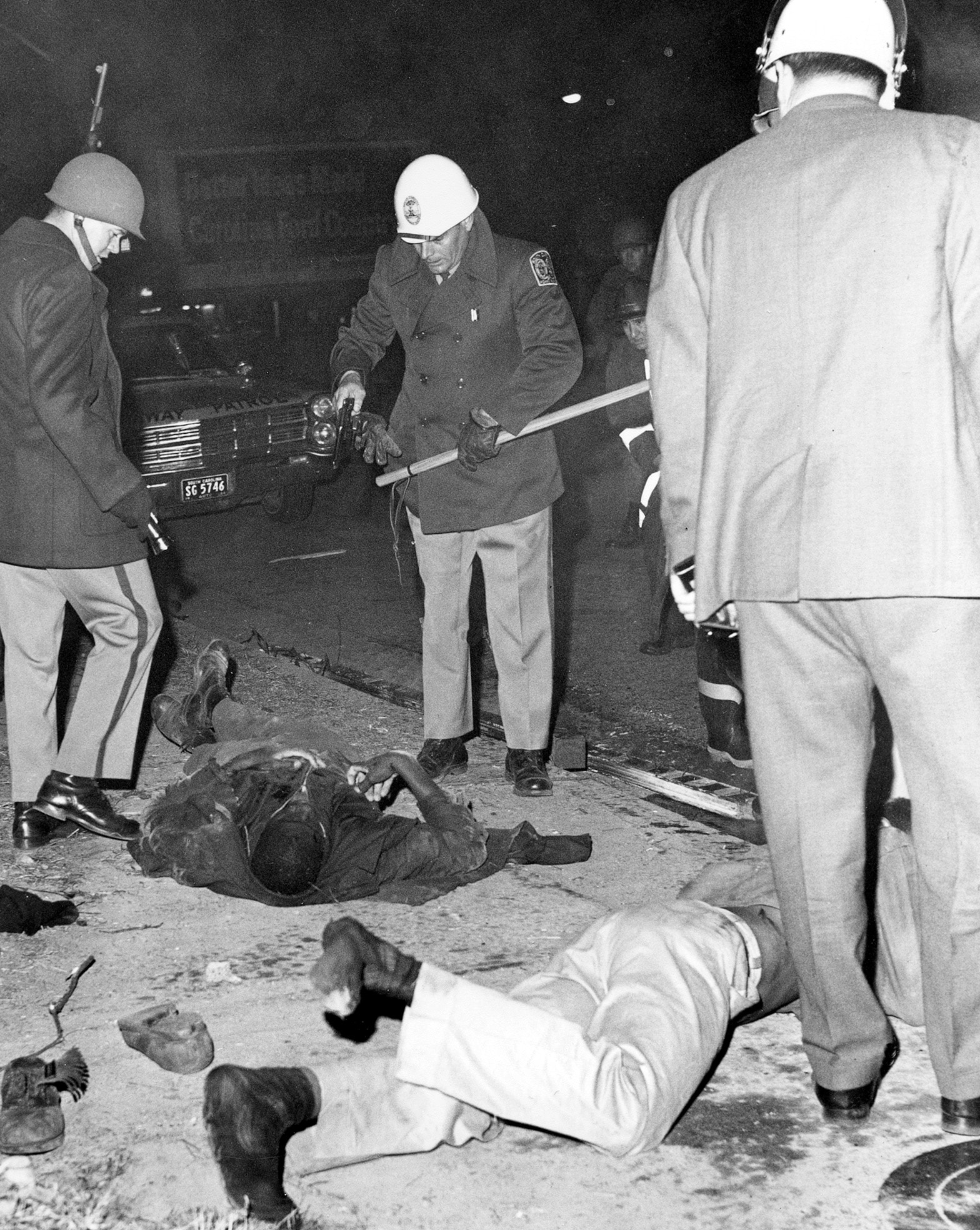
- Press photograph of state patrolmen converging close to two wounded protestors
- Location: 33.4952°N 80.8547°W; Orangeburg, South Carolina, US
- Date: February 8, 1968 approx. 10:38 p.m.
- Attack type: Mass shooting, police brutality
- Deaths: 3
- Injuries: 28
- Victims: Samuel Hammond Jr.; Delano Middleton; Henry Smith; See below for more details
- Perpetrator: South Carolina Highway Patrol

The Orangeburg Massacre was a shooting of student protesters on Thursday February 8, 1968, on the campus of South Carolina State College in Orangeburg, South Carolina, United States. Nine highway patrolmen and one city police officer opened fire on a crowd of African American students, killing three and injuring twenty-eight. The shootings were the culmination of a series of protests against de facto racial segregation at a local bowling alley, marking the first instance of police killing student protestors at an American university.

Two days before the shootings, student activists had been arrested for a sit-in at the segregated All-Star Bowling Lane. When a crowd of several hundred Claflin College and South Carolina State College (State College) students gathered outside the bowling alley to protest the arrests, police dispersed the crowd with billy clubs. Students requested permission to hold a march downtown and submitted a list of demands to city officials. The request for a march was denied, but city officials agreed to review the demands. As tensions in Orangeburg mounted over the next few days, Governor Robert McNair ordered hundreds of National Guardsmen and highway patrol officers to the city to keep the peace.

On the night of February 8, students from both colleges and Wilkinson High School started a bonfire at the front of the State College campus. When police moved to put out the fire, students threw debris at them, including a piece of a wooden banister that injured an officer. Several minutes later, at least nine patrolmen and one city police officer opened fire on the crowd of students. Dozens of fleeing students were wounded; Sam Hammond, Henry Smith, and Delano Middleton were later pronounced dead at the Orangeburg Regional Hospital.

In the aftermath of the killings, the bowling alley and most remaining whites-only establishments in Orangeburg were desegregated. Federal prosecutors charged nine patrolmen with deprivation of rights under color of law by firing on the demonstrators, but they were acquitted in the subsequent trial. The state of South Carolina charged one of the protestors, Cleveland Sellers, with several riot charges. He was convicted on charges relating to events two days before the massacre. Sellers received a full pardon in 1993. In 2001, Jim Hodges became the first governor to make a formal apology for the massacre.

== Background ==
Orangeburg had a long history of student civil rights activism leading up to the events of 1968. In March 1960, students at South Carolina State College and Claflin College marched through downtown to protest segregation. Led by Charles McDew and Thomas Gaither (later known as a member of the Friendship Nine), the approximately 1,000 marchers were assaulted by firemen and police officers with fire hoses and tear gas. Police arrested close to 400 students and confined many of them outdoors in a cattle stockade. The events prompted administrators at South Carolina State College to promise that students involved in any future demonstrations would be expelled.

The South Carolina State College (State College) underwent a major change in administration just before the 1967–1968 school year. The college had been led for the preceding decade by President Brenner Turner, a conservative on civil rights who strove to maintain good relations with the white state government. Students were bound by a strict code of conduct and forbidden to form political organizations or take part in civil rights protests. These policies provoked sporadic student protests that the Turner administration firmly shut down. However, in the spring of 1967, student frustration exploded in a prolonged walkout that paralyzed the school. Students convinced Governor McNair to mediate, leading to Turner's resignation. The new interim president lifted many of the restrictions on students, including allowing political clubs to be established on campus. The two most important of these were the Black Awareness Coordinating Committee (BACC) and a chapter of the NAACP. The NAACP chapter took a moderate stance on civil rights and had over 300 members. (Note: For the NAACP's membership count, see Bass & Nelson 1984, p. 10; For their political stance, see Sellers 1990, p. 208) The BACC was much smaller—its membership hovered around twenty students—and represented students who embraced black pride and were interested in black power. To the white community and the black middle class, the creation of the BACC was ominous. They associated black power with the radical rhetoric of the new Student Nonviolent Coordinating Committee (SNCC) leaders such as Stokely Carmichael and H. Rap Brown. This view was reinforced when a SNCC organizer, Cleveland Sellers, arrived in Orangeburg in October. In his autobiography, Sellers wrote that he had returned to his home state because "I believed I could develop a movement by focusing attention on the problems of the poor blacks in South Carolina." The Orangeburg elites viewed Sellers as an outside agitator who was there to stir up trouble.

There were several ongoing sources of racial tension at State College and in the surrounding city. An independent committee had been set up after Turner's resignation to investigate how conditions at the college could be improved, and they issued a list of recommendations. However, by the start of 1968 the board of trustees had still not formally accepted their findings. Despite a wide disparity in funding between State College and white colleges in South Carolina, in January, Governor McNair announced that he was rejecting State College's request for a budget increase. (Note: For the 1968–1969 school year, State College was appropriated $3,298,414.00. In comparison, the University of South Carolina, the state's flagship white institution, received $16,518,250.00.) Orangeburg had not yet seen the same civil rights reforms as most areas in the south. Many institutions remained segregated, including doctors' offices, entertainment venues, and the Orangeburg Regional Hospital. Political offices remained beyond the reach of black citizens, in part because the city boundaries were gerrymandered to exclude blacks.

== Integration campaign at All-Star Bowling Lane ==
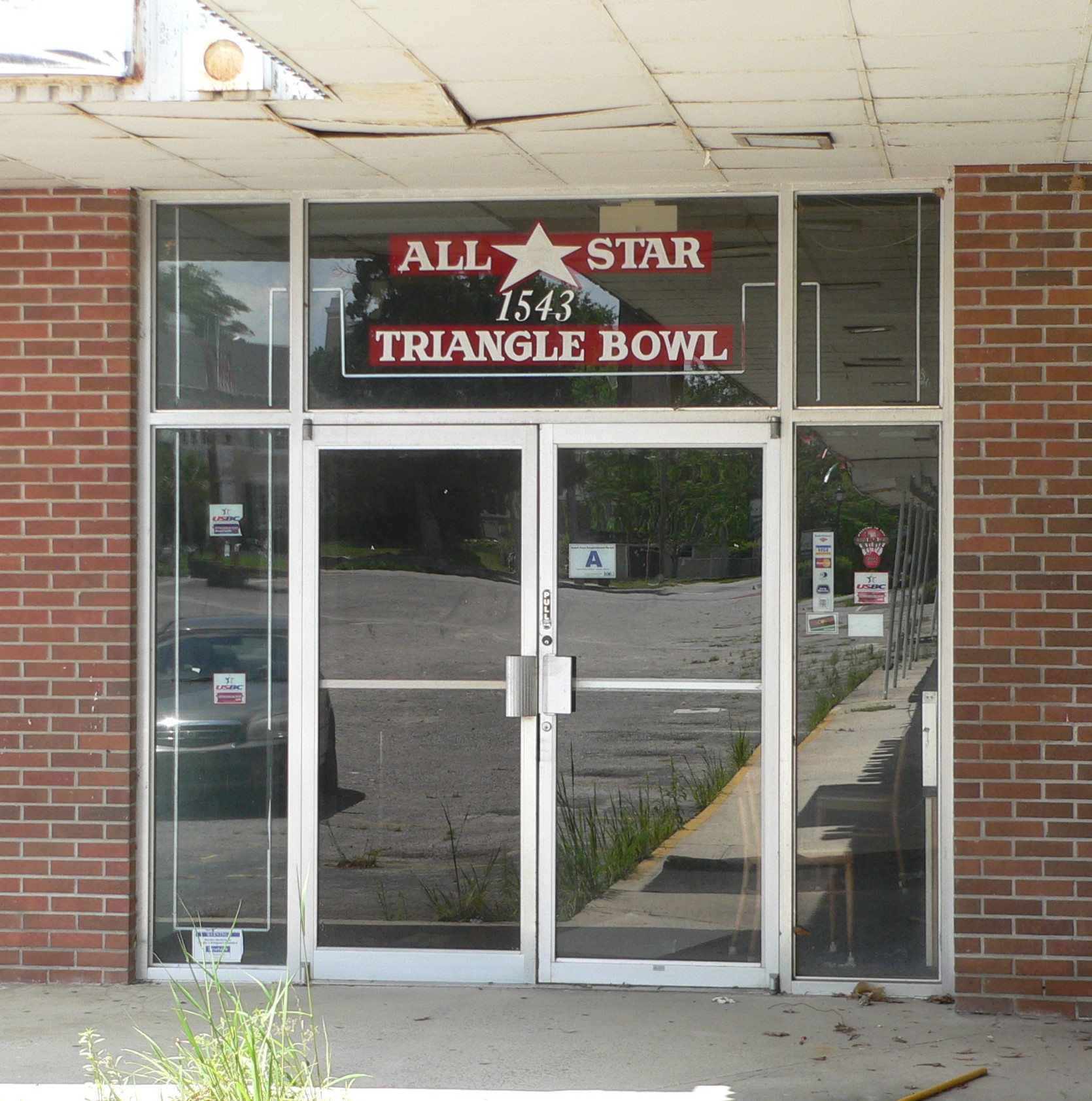
The entrance to All-Star Bowling Lane, pictured in 2015 after its name was changed

In the summer and fall of 1967, a whites-only bowling alley near campus, All-Star Bowling Lane, became a focus of student protests. Owner Harry K. Floyd repeatedly refused students' requests to desegregate. Instead, he followed the trend of replacing his "Whites Only" sign with one saying "Privately Owned" (and saying that only "club members" would be allowed in). In October, the college's NAACP chapter invited a lawyer to discuss how they could mount a legal challenge. The lawyer explained that while the legal status of de facto segregated bowling alleys was unclear, the fact that All-Star had a lunch counter meant that it was required to de jure desegregate under the Civil Rights Act of 1964. Student activist John Stroman devised a plan to prove that Floyd's club-members-only strategy was a cover for refusing black patrons: he would ask a white student without a club membership to try bowling at the alley. On Monday, February 5, 1968, the white student arrived and was able to start bowling without being asked to prove his club membership. A little while later, Stroman and a group of black students (Note: Stroman had initially planned to go alone, but on the day of a group of classmates insisted on accompanying him. Sources differ on the exact number, Shuler says it was about a dozen.) arrived and asked to bowl. When the staff refused to let them, the students tried sitting at the lunch counter and were refused service there as well. The staff threw away anything they touched. Stroman pointed out to Floyd that the white student had been allowed to bowl without ever showing that he was a member, but Floyd just called the police. City Police Chief Roger Poston arrived and ordered the alley closed for the night. Chief Poston then met with Stroman and told him that he would have to arrest him for trespassing if he returned to the bowling alley. Stroman responded that getting arrested was his plan so that he could challenge the policy in court.

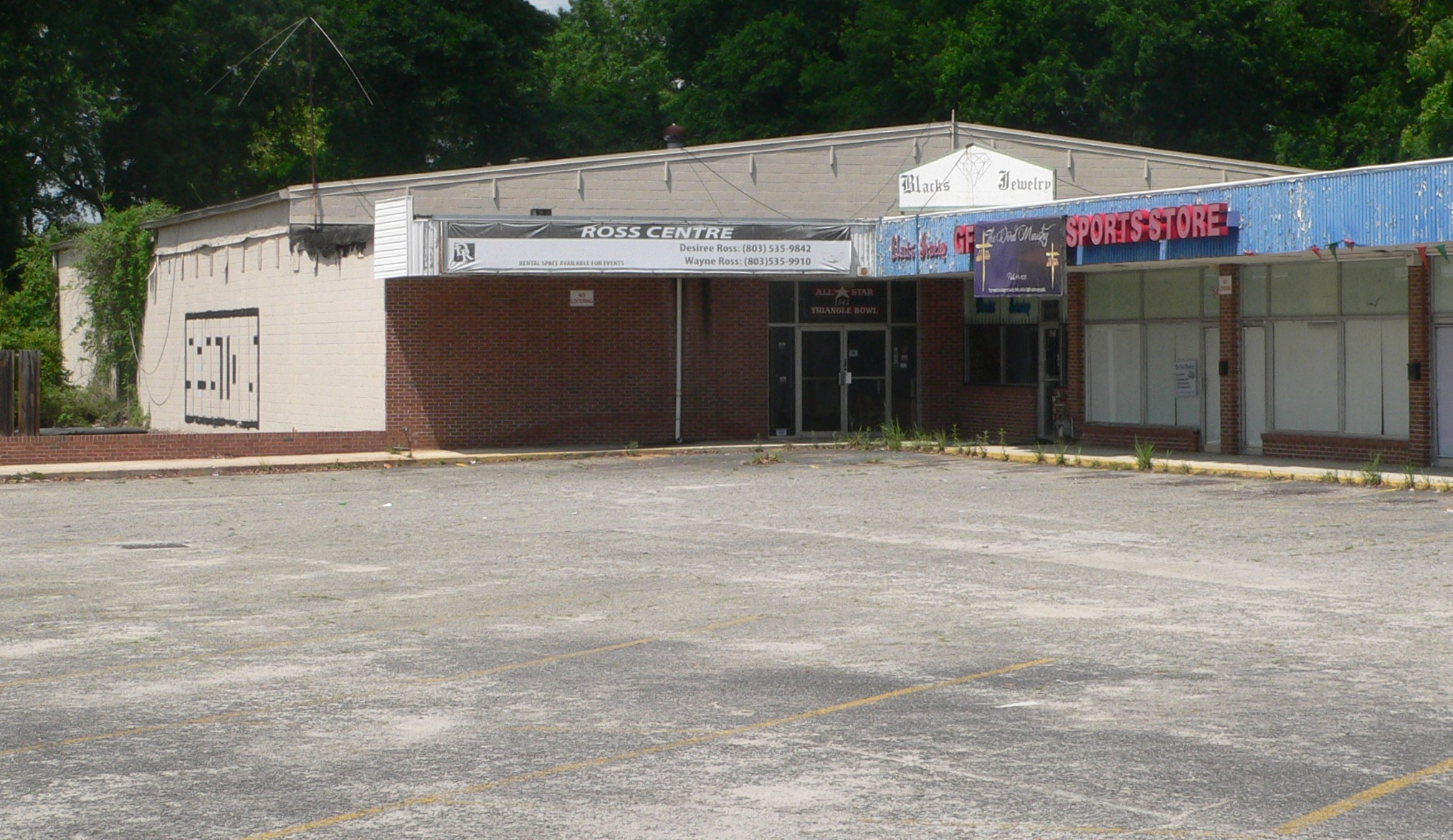
The bowling alley parking lot

Stroman and a group of about 40 students returned to the bowling alley on Tuesday evening. They were met by 20 officers led by Chief Poston and South Carolina Law Enforcement Division (SLED) Chief J. P. Strom. Chief Poston told Stroman that 40 was probably more than needed to start the court case, so Stroman asked the women and any men who did not want to be arrested to leave. The fifteen remaining staged a brief sit-in and were arrested for trespassing. To this point, everything had proceeded as planned. But as the police were leading the arrestees outside, another student was arrested for cursing at an officer. One student later recalled that this was a turning point, saying "[e]verything was cool until the cops rushed into the crowd of students outside in the parking lot and arrested some cat." As the arrestees were driven downtown, one student returned to campus and shared news of the arrests with a crowd leaving a movie theater. The crowd, without knowing the arrests were planned, arrived at the bowling alley to make sure the arrestees were not being mistreated. When the police saw the new crowd gathering, they offered to release Stroman and his classmates on the condition that they help defuse the situation at the bowling alley. This worked at first; Stroman and the others returned and were able to explain that the arrests were planned. Students began to return to campus.

The mood of the crowd changed when a fire truck arrived. Fire hoses had been used in Orangeburg as a form of crowd control and had a reputation for brutality. Chief Poston was unaware of this and had called the truck as backup. The students interpreted the move as an act of aggression, and they began to shout insults at the firefighters. The police moved away from the alley to protect the fire truck from the students. A student then broke one of the alley's windows. The police arrested the suspect, but the crowd blocked them from leaving. Police and students began yelling abuse at each other. Although it is not clear which happened first, police began beating students with billy clubs and one student sprayed something in an officer's eyes. The beatings continued for several minutes. Witnesses described seeing an officer grab and restrain a female student while another beat her with his club. Others reported seeing "a young woman begging not to be hit again, even as a policeman swung his club". Cecil Williams recalled seeing two officers beating a female student who fell while fleeing. Eight students and one officer were sent to the hospital. The rest of the students fled back to campus, some smashing the windows of cars and businesses on their way. Although the Associated Press ran a story the following day claiming that cars had been overturned; in fact, the students had not overturned any cars and had caused less than $5000 in damages.

As soon as students arrived back on campus, they held an impromptu mass meeting. Sellers was present at the meeting, and, when asked for his advice, suggested that the students immediately occupy the intersections in front of campus and demand to speak to the chamber of commerce about the bowling alley issue. This proposal was rejected. Eventually, the students agreed to ask permission to hold a protest march the following day and drew up a list of ten demands. The demands included desegregating the bowling alley, the hospital, and doctors' offices as well as an end to police brutality.

=== Escalation of tensions ===
Map showing State College, the bowling alley, and surroundings

Tensions escalated rapidly over the next few days. On Wednesday morning, the student leaders submitted their request to hold a march, but were rebuffed. Instead, Mayor E. O. Pandarvis, City Manager Bob Stevenson, and several Orangeburg business leaders came to the State College campus in an attempt to placate the students. City leaders were unprepared for the students' questions and had no response to the demands read off by the students. The head of the chamber of commerce was slightly more conciliatory and offered to read the demands at the chamber's next meeting. There was no local media coverage of the students' grievances: The Times and Democrat (Orangeburg's local newspaper) did not publish the students' list of demands until several days later (when they reported that the city council had rejected them). In a journal article published a few months after the shooting, Washington Post reporter Jim Hoagland argued that this media silence may have contributed to the students' frustration and anger.

There were several outbreaks of violence on Wednesday. With no protest planned, frustrated students gathered in informal groups to discuss the police "whipping our girls". Several crowds of angry students threw rocks and bricks at cars driving on U.S. Route 601 that contained white passengers. Police responded by setting up roadblocks to block traffic. Two blocks from campus, a homeowner shot and injured three Claflin College students who he said had been trespassing. Late that night, two white men drove a car onto campus and shot at students before being chased off with rocks and bottles. (Note: The perpetrators were later caught, but because the police could not find a weapon, they were only fined for reckless driving.)

On Wednesday evening Governor McNair decided to activate the National Guard. His main concern, shared by the police chiefs, was based on the unfounded rumor that the "plan of the black power people" was to attack utilities and burn down the city. (Note: SLED Chief Strom was later quoted as saying "because we know that's the plan of the black power people—to do away with your waterworks, lights, telephone service, so forth, gas and such things as that".) Therefore, 250 Orangeburg-area National Guards took up positions protecting utilities across the city, joined by hundreds of highway patrol officers. On Thursday, McNair ordered an additional 110 National Guardsmen to Orangeburg. They were joined by FBI agents, officers from SLED, and Governor McNair's representatives. Journalist Jack Shuler argued that the arrival of these outside officials "disrupted any kind of communication among white leaders, the college campuses, and the African American community". Shuler cites Sellers as saying that while negotiations had been slow before the arrival of state officials, afterwards they broke down.

== Shooting ==
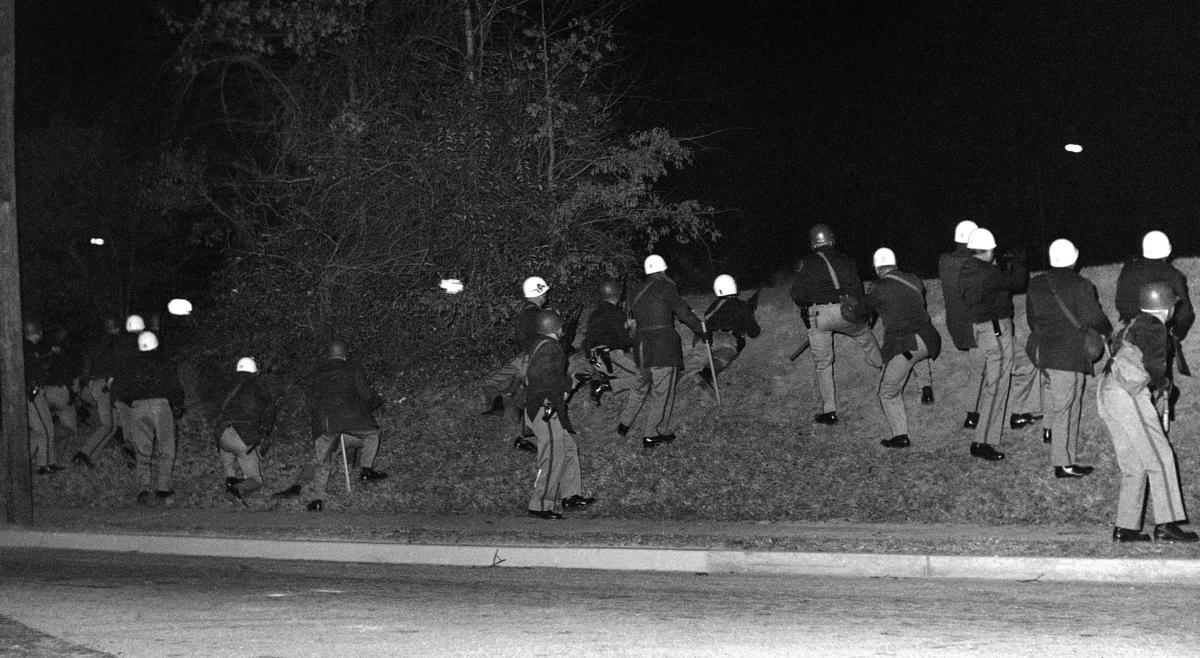
Highway patrolmen in position behind the embankment.

By the evening of Thursday, February 8, tensions were high and the police had set up a command post (nicknamed "Checkpoint Charlie") at the intersection of Russell Street and US Highway 601 to monitor the State College campus. Around 7:00 p.m., about 50 State College students gathered at the front of campus to start a bonfire. Police intervened to stop them and called up additional Highway Patrolmen to Checkpoint Charlie and to a warehouse and freight depot across from Claflin College (see map). Students began to shout insults at the police. A .22 caliber pistol was fired from a dormitory over the heads of the police stationed near the warehouse and freight depot. (Note: During the later investigation, .22 caliber bullet holes were found in a building opposite the warehouse. FBI and SLED officers testified that the trajectories came from the direction of the campus, but the FBI crime lab expert contradicted this.) About 9:30 p.m., a larger group of students led by State College student Henry Smith made a second attempt at building a bonfire. This time they were successful, using wood from a nearby abandoned house. About 200 students from State College, Claflin, and Wilkinson High School spent the next hour gathered around the bonfire in good spirits. They told reporters that they would stay as long as the police did.

More than 130 police from at least five agencies (Note: Including 60 highway patrolmen, 45 National Guards, 25 SLED agents, along with various FBI agents and local police.) were positioned near the front of State College's campus. They were under the overall command of SLED Chief Strom, and under orders from Governor McNair not to let the students leave campus. Through journalist intermediaries, Strom attempted to get the students to move away from the front of campus, a request that they refused unless the police would leave first. At about 10:30 p.m., Strom and the other leading officers decided to call a firetruck to put out the bonfire. When the truck arrived, it advanced slowly up U.S. 601 with a police escort. On the truck's left, between the highway and railroad tracks were the National Guard. On the truck's right, a squad of highway patrol officers under Lieutenant Jesse Spell advanced up Watson Street. The students retreated towards Lowman Hall, throwing rocks and bottles. The fire was quickly extinguished but continued to smolder. As Spell's squad turned to scale the embankment at the end of Watson Street, someone threw two white banister posts at patrolmen Donald Crosby and David Shealy. Crosby ducked, but Shealy was struck in the mouth and injured. The other patrolmen thought that Shealy had been shot, and several rushed to his aid.

I remember hearing someone laugh just before we realized we were being shot at. We thought they were shooting in the air.

— Jordon M. Simmons III

About five minutes later (around 10:38 p.m.), many of the students began to walk back towards the embankment, unaware that the patrolmen believed Shealy had been shot. Most of the sixty-six patrolmen in front of them had taken up positions behind the embankment or in the surrounding vegetation and were invisible to the students. When the first students reached about 100 feet from the officers, some witnesses recalled hearing a patrolman fire a shot into the air, possibly as a warning. Other witnesses would later recall hearing a whistle, as if signaling to fire. In either case, the noise caused the students to turn and run, some holding their hands in the air or dropping to the ground. Lieutenant Spell then shouted "now"; he and at least eight other patrolmen opened fire on the students. (Note: Most would later tesitfy that they fired without hearing Spell's order) City police officer John Cook joined in as well, and four additional patrolmen fired over the students' heads. The shooting lasted eight seconds. Most patrolmen fired from Remington Model 870 shotguns, while a few used carbines and one fired a pistol. After expending several rounds, Lieutenant Spell gave the order to cease fire.

The black and red dots represent injured and killed students, respectively. The location of the third killed student, Samuel Hammond, is unknown. The numbered students are 1) Henry Smith, 2) Delano Middleton, 3) Ernest Carson, 4) Bobby Burton, and 5) Cleveland Sellers. The locations of the patrolmen charged with firing on the crowd are shown with blue squares. Lt. Spell is marked with an S.

=== Victims ===
Thirty-one victims are known to have been hit by police fire. (Note: These figures include John H. Elliott, a 23-year-old Claflin student who did not report his injuries at the time. He came forward shortly before the 40th anniversary.) The victims' ages ranged between 15 and 23. They included seven students from Claflin, nineteen from State College, and three from Wilkinson High School. Two others were not students: Joseph Hampton, a recent State College graduate and Cleveland Sellers, a SNCC community organizer. Most victims sustained injuries from behind while fleeing or on the soles of the feet while lying on the ground. The most serious non-fatal wounds included those to Bobby Burton, whose left arm was paralyzed, and to Ernest Raymond Carson, who was hit by eight buckshot slugs. Three of those injured would later die of their wounds at the Orangeburg Regional Hospital: Samuel Ephesians Hammond, Delano Herman Middleton, and Henry Ezekial Smith. Smith and Hammond were both State College students, while Middleton was a senior at Wilkinson High School. Hammond was killed by a shot to his back. Middleton received seven bullet wounds: three to his arm and one each to his hip, thigh, and heart. Smith was killed by shots from both sides, leaving five bullet wounds. Many of the student witnesses believed that the patrolmen had mistaken Smith for Sellers and had aimed their fire at him. The patrolmen testified that they had not aimed at any specific target.

=== Immediate aftermath ===
The injured students were taken to the segregated waiting room at Orangeburg Regional Hospital. Reporters overheard one of the patrolmen gloating over police radio, saying "You should have been here, ol' buddy; got a couple of 'em tonight." Over the next few hours the police arrested and heavily beat several more people. Louise Kelly Crawley would suffer a miscarriage after she was arrested and beaten while taking injured students to the hospital. John Carson approached several officers in the waiting room and demanded to know why they had shot his younger brother, Ernest Raymond, eight times. The patrolmen refused to answer, and when Carson continued to repeat his question, they placed him under arrest and beat him in the head with their rifle butts. Cleveland Sellers was arrested while awaiting hospital treatment; he would later be charged with inciting a riot, arson, assault and battery with intent to kill, property damage, housebreaking, and grand larceny. Some of the hospital staff insulted and demeaned the students. Oscar Butler recalled overhearing a staff member say "they asked for it".

Half an hour after the shooting, a group of students broke into the ROTC building and stole a handful of training rifles. The rifles lacked firing pins and, after other students spoke to the group that had stolen the rifles, they were returned within about twenty minutes.

== Public reactions and media coverage ==
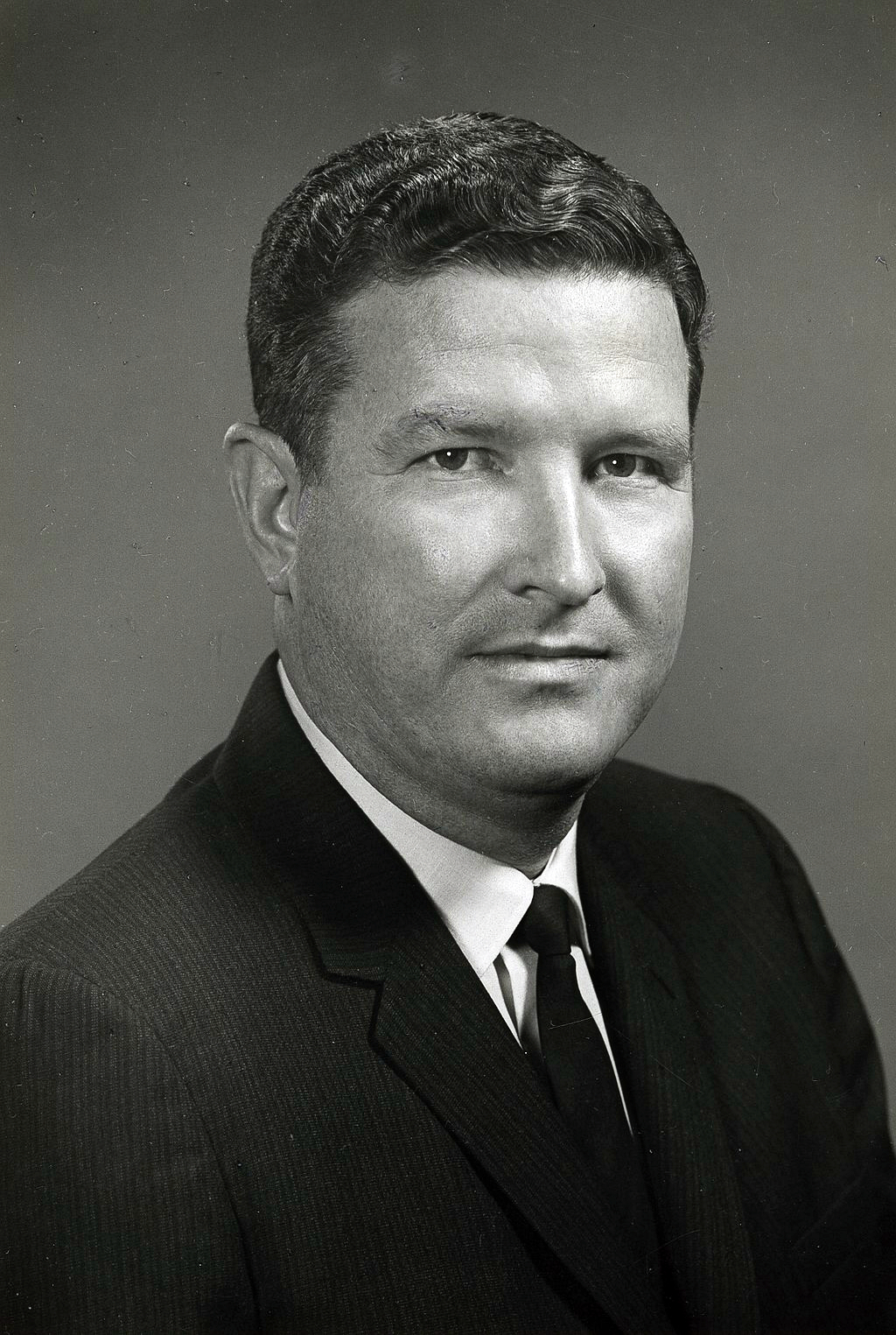
Robert McNair, Governor of South Carolina from 1965 to 1971

The reaction of the mainstream media was mainly indifference or support for the actions of the police. Civil rights demonstrations had come to be seen as violent after major riots in Detroit and Newark the previous summer. According to journalist and later historian Dave Nolan, "most whites seemed to feel that it was justified to put them down as brutally as possible." This predisposition was reinforced by inaccurate reporting on the ground. The Associated Press reported that there had been a "heavy exchange of gunfire" and never issued a correction. Newspapers across the country ran the AP story with headlines such as "Three Die in Riot", "Trio Slain after Opening Fire on Police", or "Three Killed as Negroes, Police Exchange Shots". (Note: For "Three Die in Riot", see: "Three Die in Riot". The Iola Register. AP. February 9, 1968. p. 1.; For "Trio Slain after Opening Fire on Police", see: "3 Negro Teens Die In Orangeburg Riot: Trio Slain After Opening Fire On Police". The Circeville Herald. AP. February 9, 1968. p. 1.; For "Three Killed as Negroes, Police Exchange Shots", see: "Three Killed as Negroes, Police Exchange Shots". Hobbs Daily News-Sun. AP. February 9, 1968. p. 1.; For another example, see: "Riot Quelled at Negro College". The Milwaukee Journal. AP. February 21, 1968.) Governor McNair gave a speech about the massacre the following day. He called it "...one of the saddest days in the history of South Carolina", but said that the shootings had taken place off campus, that the officers were reacting to being fired upon, and that the shootings had been necessary "to protect life and property." (Note: For first quote, see: "Uneasy Calm Enforced After Days of Rioting". Middlesboro Daily News. UPI. February 10, 1968.; For second quote, see: Bass & Nelson 1984, p. 81) He accused "black power advocates" of having "sparked" the incident, and mentioned the theft of ROTC rifles as having helped escalate the situation. The Governor's office blamed Cleveland Sellers in particular. McNair's spokesman told reporters that Sellers was "the main man. He's the biggest nigger in the crowd" and said that he was the one who had thrown the banister at Officer Shealy. The Governor's account of events was widely accepted by the mainstream media in the weeks following the event. Most of the white reporters in Orangeburg failed to investigate official claims, interview key witnesses, or ask the police probing questions. According to Washington Post reporter Jim Hoagland, they "covered the story largely from the Holiday Inn."

Martin Luther King Jr. blamed the massacre on SLED Chief J. P. Strom, and called for an investigation by the US Attorney General. The NAACP's executive director Roy Wilkins echoed King's call for an investigation. John Lewis accused the white press of conspiring to obscure the true nature of events. SNCC chairman Rap Brown issued the most radical statement, calling for black people to take up arms in self-defense and to "die like men". In the State College newspaper The Collegian, students decried the inaccurate reporting in the mainstream press and argued for why the anti-segregation protests were justified. Black students staged demonstrations across the country. In Greenville, South Carolina, black and white students (mostly from Furman) protested together against the killings.

Despite the fact that the Orangeburg Massacre was the first time police shot and killed students on a United States university campus, they received much less media coverage than the later police shootings at Kent State and Jackson State. For example, the week's issue of Time did not mention the event. Dave Nolan argues that the subject of the protests may have played a role: by 1968, the white public was no longer supportive of demonstrations against segregation, whereas at the time the Kent and Jackson State students were killed, the Vietnam War was a highly charged national issue. Jack Bass and civil rights lawyer Eva Paterson argue that race was a key factor; the most famous of the three incidents (Kent State) was the one where the victims were white. Bass also suggests that the fact that Orangeburg happened at night, meaning there were fewer videos or photographs, had an impact on public reactions. Survivor Thomas Kennerly blamed the lack of attention on the reactions of state officials. He also recalled that the Orangeburg Massacre was followed by the assassinations of Martin Luther King Jr. and Robert F. Kennedy, which quickly took over the news cycle. In contrast, Kent State and Jackson State happened in close succession, keeping the issue of how campus unrest was handled by law enforcement and university administrations in the public eye.

== Subsequent protests ==
Orangeburg remained in a state of high tension in the weeks after the shootings. Both colleges closed and let their students return home. McNair placed Orangeburg under a curfew. Hundreds of National Guards and highway patrolmen remained in the city despite a petition by 800 black residents to have them withdrawn. The NAACP launched a boycott of all of Orangeburg's white businesses starting on February 11.

On March 7, BACC organized a protest of 200 Orangeburg students at the South Carolina State House. A group led by Steve Moore attempted to read a petition to the South Carolina Senate from the gallery, but was stopped and six students were arrested. (Note: The charges against the students were later dropped.) On March 13, BACC led a second protest of 1000 students to Columbia and were met by police in riot gear. After some resistance, McNair eventually agreed to meet with a delegation of students.

== Court cases ==
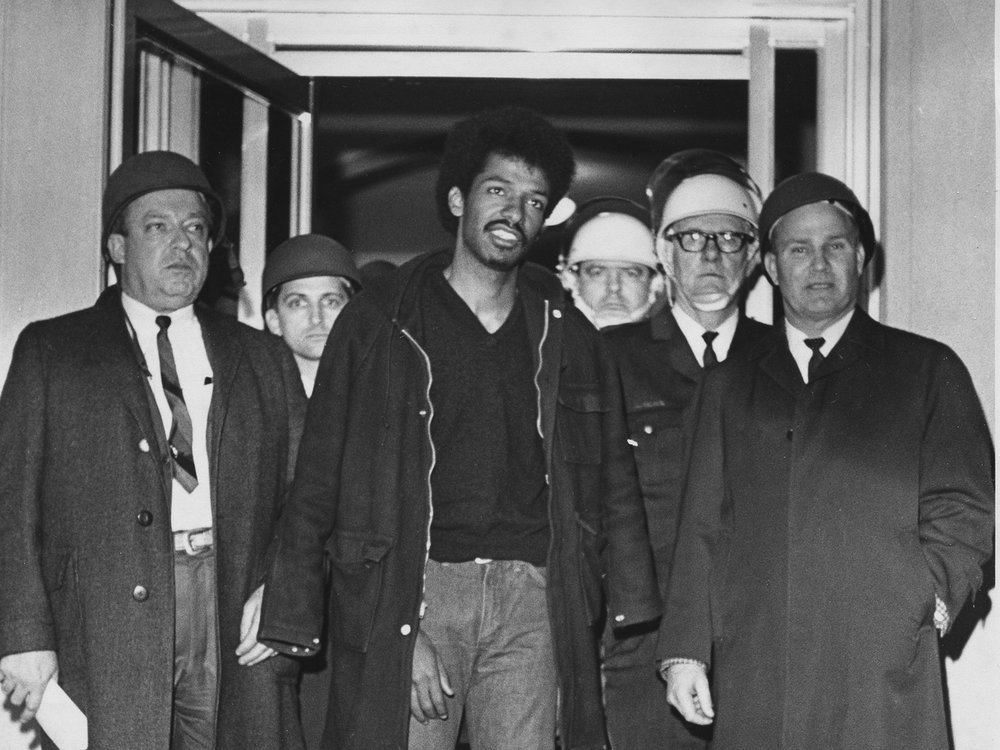
Cleveland Sellers was arrested at the Orangeburg Regional Hospital. In the left of the photo is SLED Police Chief J.P. Strom.

On February 10, the Department of Justice filed a suit against Harry Floyd (who insisted that he had a right to refuse business to black patrons). The department also filed against the Orangeburg Regional Hospital, which remained segregated despite having promised to integrate in 1965. On February 22, federal Judge Robert Martin ordered All-Star Bowling Lane to desegregate. John Stroman became one of the first group of black students to bowl there on the day classes resumed, February 26. Most businesses in Orangeburg followed suit and desegregated.

Federal prosecutors filed an information against the nine state patrolmen who had admitted to firing on the crowd, including Lt. Spell. They were charged with carrying out summary justice, thereby depriving the students of their civil rights. It was the first federal trial of police officers for using excessive force at a campus protest. The state patrol officers' defense was that they felt they were in danger, and protesters had shot at the officers first. All nine defendants were acquitted, although 36 witnesses stated they did not hear gunfire from the protesters on the campus before the shooting, and no students were found to be carrying guns. In 2007, the FBI reopened the case as part of its re-examination of civil rights-era crimes, but it declined to bring charges because the nine officers had already been acquitted. In 2008, the Emmett Till Unsolved Civil Rights Crime Act made it possible to reopen cold cases from before 1970, and starting in 2010, the deaths of Smith, Middleton, and Hammond have been on the Department of Justice's list of unsolved civil rights cases.

In 1970, the State of South Carolina charged Cleveland Sellers with riot on the night of February 8. However, after the prosecution failed to present sufficient evidence of Seller's involvement in the events that day, the judge directed a verdict of not guilty on that charge. Instead, the judge asked the jury to consider whether Sellers was guilty of riot on February 6. The jury convicted him and he was sentenced to a fine and one year in prison. From February to August 31, 1973, Sellers served approximately seven months, getting a release five months early for good behavior. In 1993, Sellers applied for and was granted a full pardon from the South Carolina Board of Probation, Paroles and Pardons in a unanimous vote. During a conference at The Citadel on the 35th anniversary of massacre, Sellers shared his perspective on the trial and its significance:

I was the only person arrested. The only person tried. The only person found guilty and sentenced. I did not commit a crime...The S.C. attorney did not want to proceed with a trial, because there was not any evidence, but Governor McNair insisted that the state go forward. All of the original charges were dropped, and in two of the three Riot Act charges the judge ruled a "directed verdict" because of the lack of evidence. All of the people who testified against me were white law enforcement officers. In the only testimony of evidence that could be used to secure a guilty verdict against me, a white South Carolina Law Enforcement Division officer lied and testified that he saw me on top of a fire truck on the night of February 6, 1968, saying "Burn, baby, burn." I was found guilty of a "one-man riot" and sentenced to one year hard labor. There was no justice. It was a legal sham.

— Cleveland Sellers

== Legacy ==
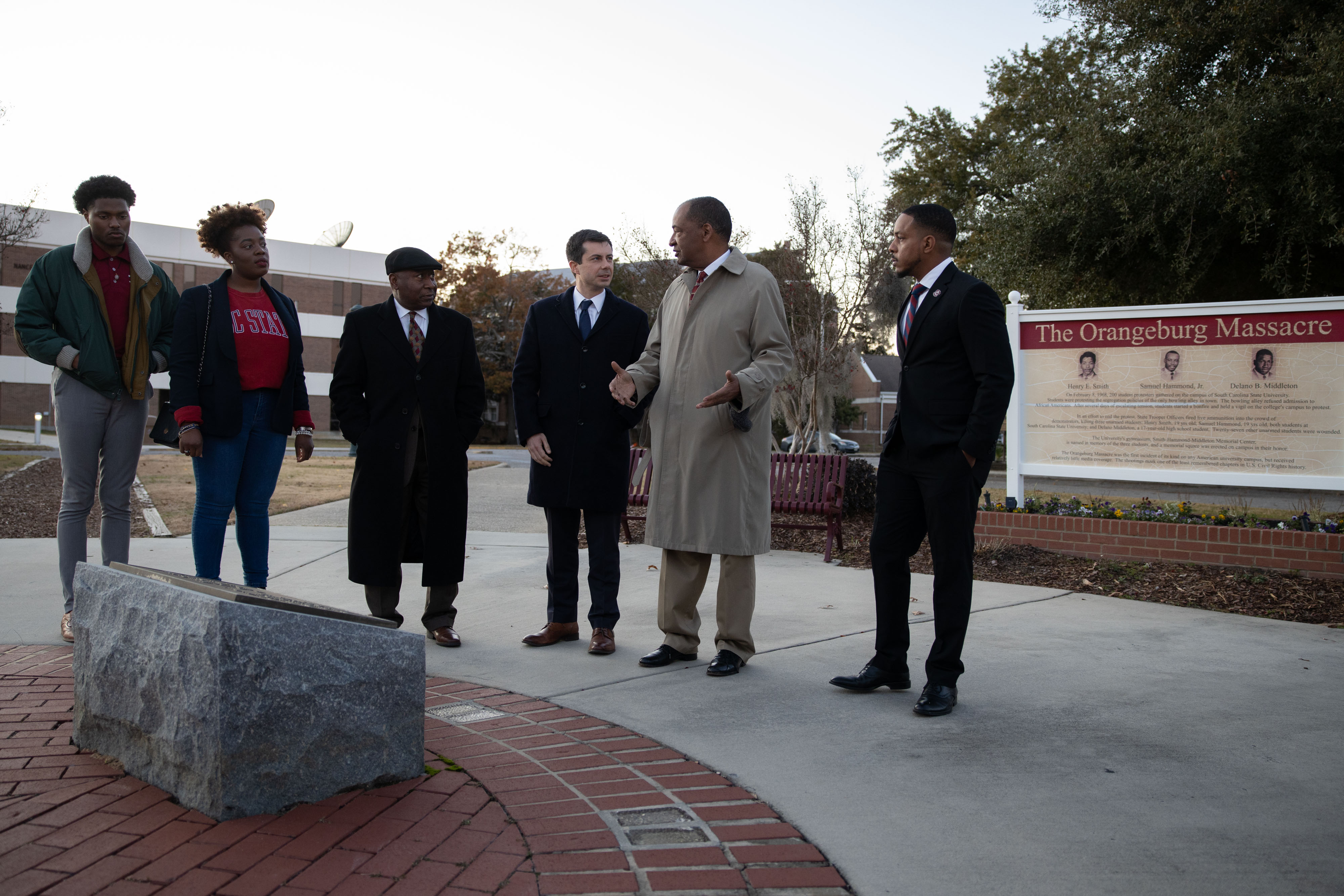
South Carolina State University's memorial for the victims in 2019

Soon after the event, students and activists dubbed it the "Orangeburg Massacre". According to Cleveland Sellers, the name was chosen to be reminiscent of the Sharpeville massacre. In Sharpeville, South African police had opened fire on and killed dozens of unarmed anti-apartheid activists. Robert McNair strongly disliked the name because he thought it suggested the shootings had been pre-planned. Nevertheless, "Orangeburg Massacre" gradually became the accepted name in the decades after the event.

South Carolina State College (now South Carolina State University) has multiple memorials dedicated to the victims. The gymnasium that opened later in the same year as the massacre was named the Smith–Hammond–Middleton Memorial Center in their honor. The college built a granite monument with the names of the victims at the center of campus in 1969. In 2000, the university erected a South Carolina Historical Marker explaining the history of the massacre near the entrance to campus. In 2022, bronze busts of the three men killed were installed behind the granite memorial.

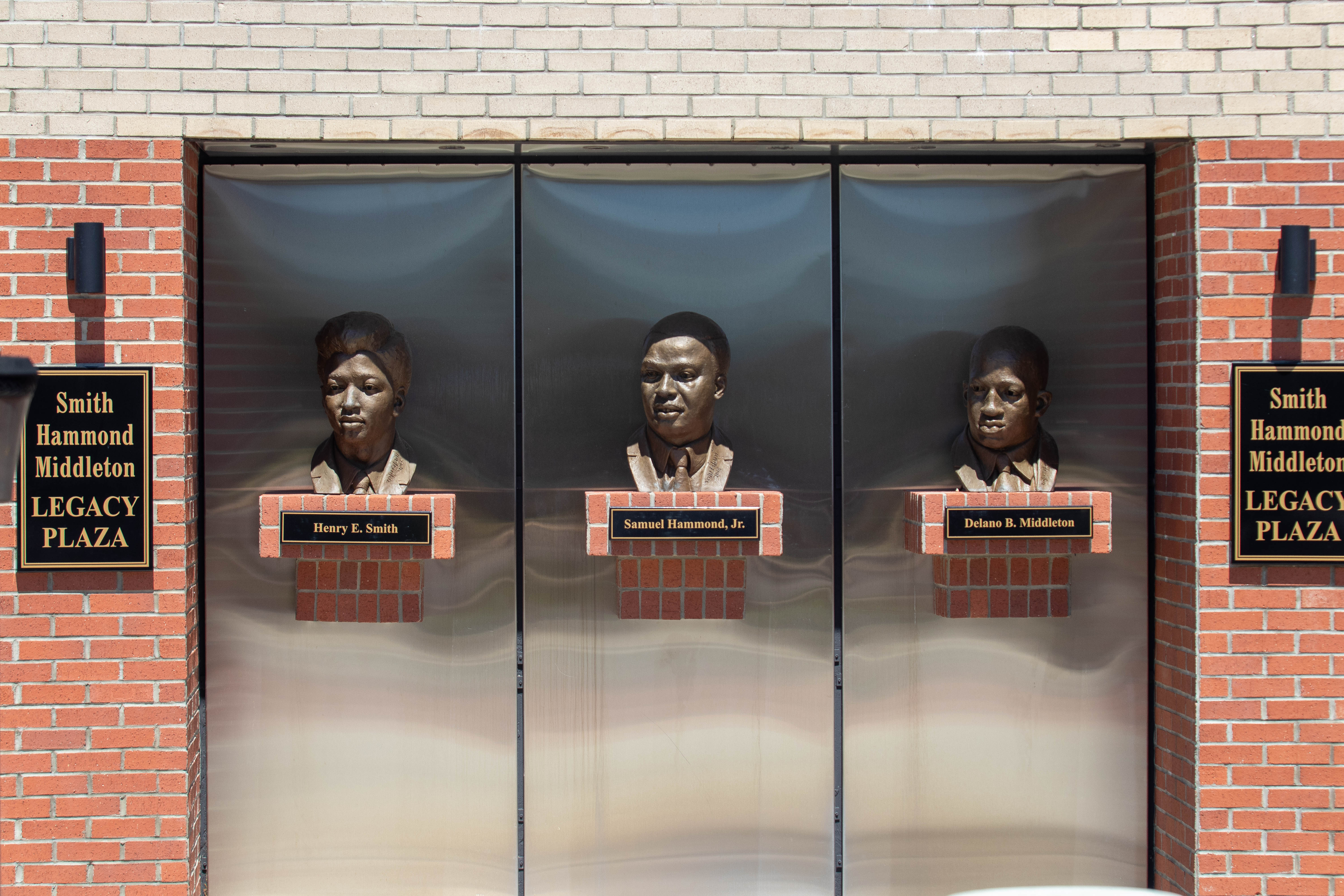

Memorial services are held every year. From 1969 to 1983 they were held at the SHM Memorial Center and since then they have been held at the monument. In 2001, on the 33rd anniversary of the killings, Governor Jim Hodges became the first governor to attend the annual memorial. He issued a formal apology for the massacre. That same year, an oral history project recorded interviews with eight of the survivors.

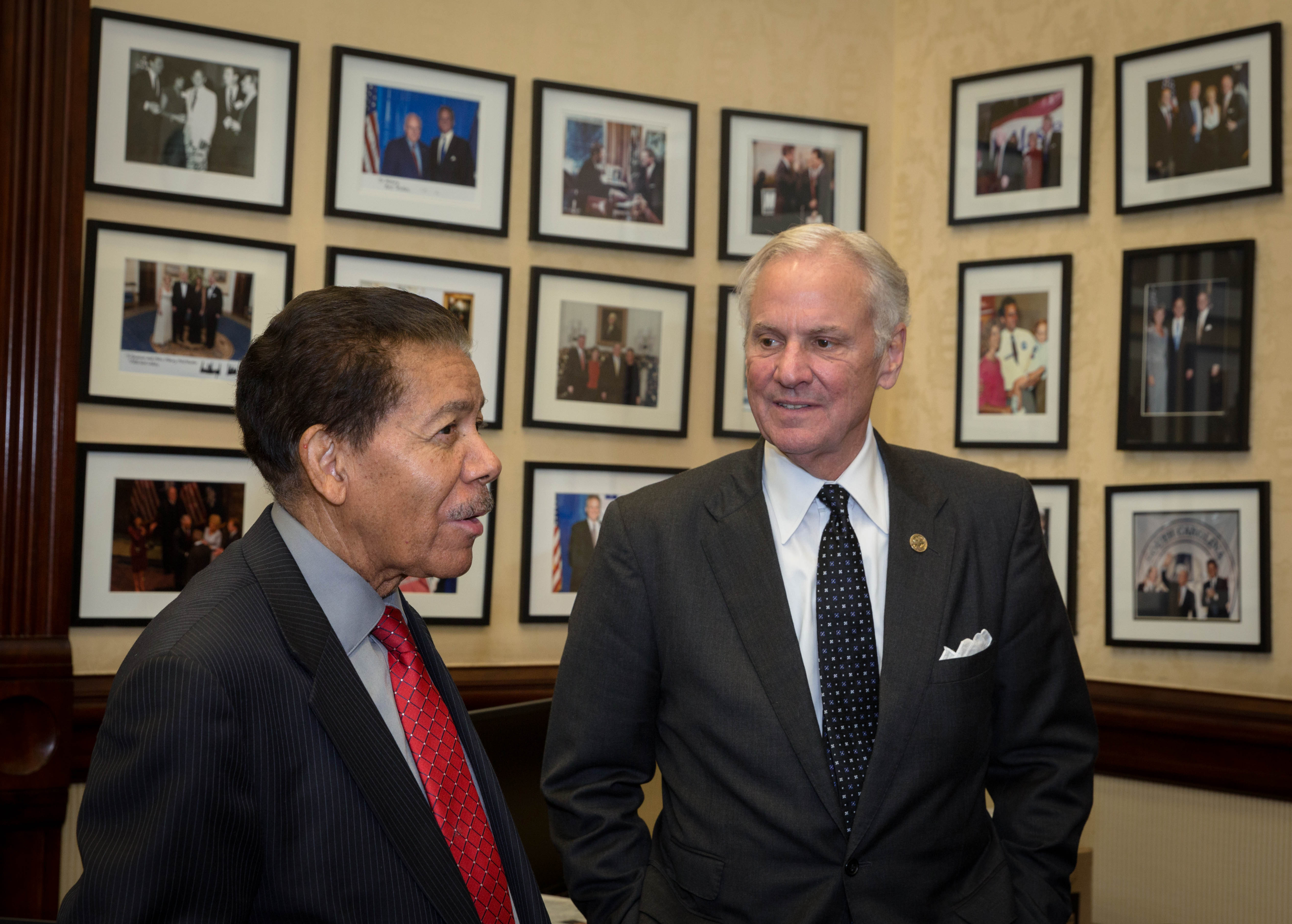
Cecil J. Williams giving Governor Henry McMaster a tour of his museum featuring photos he took of the events

A joint resolution was introduced in the South Carolina state general assembly in 2003 and re-introduced in each of the next three sessions of the legislature to establish an official investigation of the events of February 8, 1968, and to establish February 8 as a day of remembrance for the students killed and wounded in the protest. However, the legislature never voted on the resolution. (Note: For the 2002–2003 session bill, see:Joint Resolution (S. 377). South Carolina General Assembly. February 18, 2003.; For the 2004–2005 session bill, see:Joint Resolution (S. 215). South Carolina General Assembly. January 12, 2005.; For the 2006–2007 session bill, see:Joint Resolution (H. 3824). South Carolina General Assembly. March 29, 2007.; For the 2008–2009 session bill, see:Joint Resolution (S. 35). South Carolina General Assembly. January 9, 2009.)

Several works of media have also been produced about the event. It was the subject of two films released after its 40th anniversary in April 2008: Scarred Justice: The Orangeburg Massacre, 1968 by documentary filmmakers Bestor Cram and Judy Richardson; and Black Magic by Dan Klores. In 2009, the SC State Henderson Players (an acting troop of SC State students) put on a play about the events called Take a Stand.

In 2019 Cecil J. Williams, a graduate of Claflin, opened a civil rights museum that includes a collection of photographs he took of the days before and after the shooting. It is South Carolina's first civil rights museum.

== See also ==
- Greensboro massacre (1979)
- Jackson State killings (May 15, 1970)
- Kent State shootings (May 4, 1970)
- List of incidents of civil unrest in the United States
- List of killings by law enforcement officers in the United States
- List of school shootings in the United States by death toll
- Protests of 1968

== Bibliography ==
- Bass, Jack; Nelson, Jack (1984). The Orangeburg Massacre (Second ed.). Macon, GA: Mercer University Press. ISBN 9780865541207.
- Bass, Jack (Fall 2003). "Documenting the Orangeburg Massacre". Nieman Reports. 57 (3): 8–11.
- Boyce, Travis (June 2009). I Am Leaving and Not Looking Back: The Life of Benner C. Turner (PhD thesis). Ohio University.
- Breeden, Edwin C. (2019). South Carolina Historical Markers: A Guidebook (PDF). S.C. Department of Archives & History. Archived from the original (PDF) on August 2, 2023.
- Brown, Linda Meggett (February 8, 2001). "Remembering the Orangeburg Massacre". Diverse.
- Click, Carolyn (February 9, 2008). "Orangeburg Massacre 40 Years Later: Search Goes on for Reconciliation and Truth". The State.
- Hine, William C. (October 1996). "Civil Rights and Campus Wrongs". South Carolina Historical Magazine. 97 (4): 310–331.
- Hoagland, Jim (Spring 1968). "Incident at Orangeburg: A Reporter's Notes". Columbia Journalism Review. 7 (1): 5–9.
- Lau, Peter (2006). Democracy Rising: South Carolina and the Fight for Freedom Since 1895. Lexington: The University Press of Kentucky.
- Mozie, Dante (March 23, 2021). "'Eyewitnesses to a Tragedy': How the Collegian, the Student Newspaper of South Carolina State College, Covered the 1968 Orangeburg Massacre". American Journalism. 38 (1): 81–98. doi:10.1080/08821127.2021.1866420. S2CID 232326575.
- Parker, Adam (February 7, 2023). "Williams to Speak on Orangeburg Massacre". Post and Courier.
- Sellers, Cleveland; Bass, Jack; Simmons, Jordon III (2008). "Retrospectives: The Orangeburg Massacre". In Moore, Winfred B.; Burton, Orville Vernon (eds.). Toward the Meeting of the Waters: Currents in the Civil Rights Movement of South Carolina during the Twentieth Century. Columbia, South Carolina: University of South Carolina Press.
- Sellers, Cleveland (1990). The River of No Return: The Autobiography of a Black Militant and the Life and Death of SNCC. Jackson, Mississippi: University Press of Mississippi. ISBN 9780878054749.
- Sheinin, Aaron (February 8, 2001). "Gov. Hodges Will Offer Words of Reconciliation". The State. p. A8.
- Shuler, Jack (2012). Blood & Bone: Truth and Reconciliation in a Southern Town. Columbia: The University of South Carolina Press.
- Stahler, Kimberly (2018). Three Dead in South Carolina: Student Radicalization and the Forgotten Orangeburg Massacre (MA thesis). Kent State University.
- Watters, Pat; Rougeau, Weldon (February 25, 1968). Events at Orangeburg: A Report Based On Study and Interviews in Orangeburg, South Carolina, In the Aftermath of Tragedy (PDF) (Report). Southern Regional Council.
- Williams, Cecil (June 9, 2011). "Cecil J. Williams Oral History Interview". Civil Rights History Project (Interview). Interviewed by Joseph Mosnier. Orangeburg, South Carolina: Library of Congress.
- Williams, Tyuanna (July 14, 2023). "Restoration of Orangeburg Bowling Alley to Boost Downtown". The Times and Democrat.
