= Cecil J. Williams =

American photographer, publisher, author and inventor

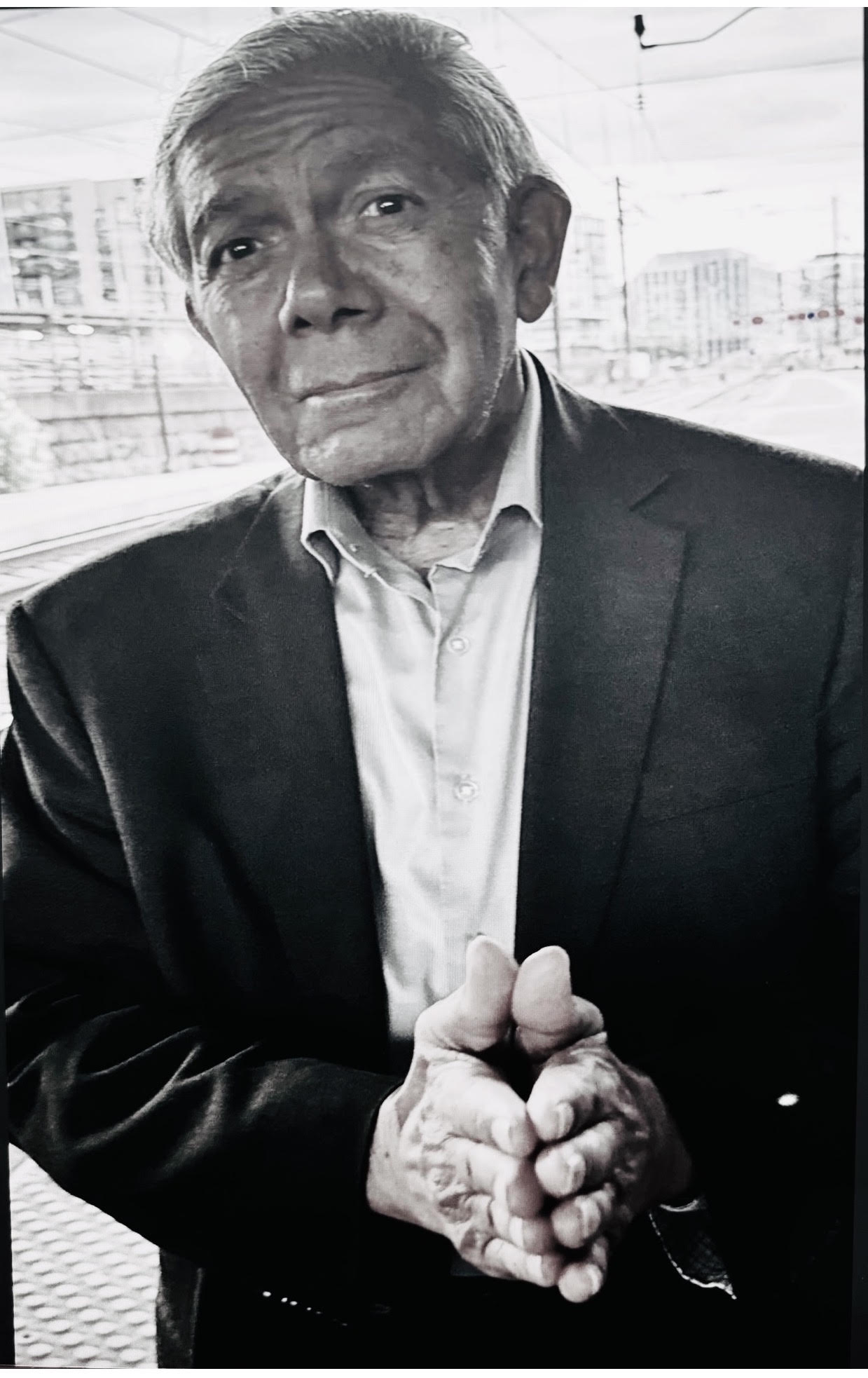
- Williams at between train cars at Union Station in Washington, D.C. (2026)
- Born: November 26, 1937 (age 88); Orangeburg, South Carolina
- Education: Claflin University
- Occupation: Photographer
- Spouse: Barbara Johnson Williams
- Website: www.cecilwilliams.com

Cecil J. Williams (born November 26, 1937) is an American photographer, publisher, author and inventor who is best known for his photographs documenting the civil rights movement in South Carolina.

He began his career at an early age, photographing wedding and family parties. He studied art at Claflin University, while also being a photographer for the university.

His work has been published in hundreds of books, newspapers and television documentaries. His photography and art has been exhibited in galleries in the Southeast.

The Cecil Williams South Carolina Civil Rights Museum in his hometown of Orangeburg, South Carolina features hundreds of his photographs documenting the civil rights movement for national publications. The museum focuses on history he has captured in South Carolina.

== Early life ==
Cecil J. Williams was born on November 26, 1937, and raised in Orangeburg, South Carolina.

He was the third child of Ethel and Cecil L. Willams. His parents both have mixed African-American ancestry; his mother's side is half white, and his father's half Native American.

Ethel Williams spent her whole life as a dedicated educator, teaching at the elementary, high school, and college level. Cecil L. Williams was a self-employed tailor, with an almost 80% white clientele. He did the alterations for downtown stores such as Belk-Hudson, Barshay Marcus Clothing Store, and Limehouse Men's Stores.

Williams helped his father with his business by delivering the clothes back to the stores when they were finished, and at the end of the week delivered the bills and collected money for his father's services.

At the age of 9, Williams received a gift which changed the course of his life. His older brother had been given a camera by his mother, but he went on to be more interested in music and the saxophone, which ultimately led him to hand the camera down to Williams. A Kodak Baby Brownie was the first camera he would ever own, which he still has, and which still works. This was the start to a newfound passion, and he later used an extra bedroom in the family's house as a darkroom to develop negatives.

He began photographing people on Sundays when people were dressed at their finest. As he kept taking pictures, he began to realize that he could make money from this. He began earning a dollar or two by taking pictures of people in the local Edisto Gardens.

At age 11, he photographed his first wedding.

When Williams was 12, his mentor, E.C. Jones from Sumter, South Carolina, asked him to take photos of the churches of Clarendon County, which happened to hold the families of the DeLaine and the Pearson families from the Briggs v. Elliott petition.

== Career ==
At the age of 14, Williams was one of 25 photographers around the world freelancing for JET magazine. JET caught wind of the movement growing in Orangeburg. They needed an onsite correspondent for constant updates, and someone to document the events. The only time Williams' work appeared on the cover of JET was his picture of Coretta Scott King speaking at the protest during the 1969 Charleston hospital workers' strike.

Williams has photographed significant desegregation efforts in South Carolina since the 1950s. Some of his most notable pictures are of the activity during the Briggs v. Elliott case in Summerton. It was the first of five desegregation cases pushing to integrate public schools in the United States. The five cases combined into Brown v. Board of Education, the 1954 U.S. Supreme Court case that declared that having "separate but equal" public schools for whites and blacks was unconstitutional.

In November 2023, Williams's dream of gaining attention to the hijacking of the name, Briggs v. Elliott, where the U.S. Supreme Court titled the class action suit—Brown v. Board of Education—a suit composed of 5 cases—finally gained some traction. He solicited the help of Dr. Thomas Mullikin—an attorney who practices law in Camden, South Carolina—to assist in filing a petition to the Supreme Court asking to rename the Brown case to Bragg v. Elliott; the first of the cases and catalyst that inspired 4 other suits. A response has not yet been received.

As a young professional, he also contributed to other publications, including the Baltimore Afro-American, Associated Press, and Pittsburgh Courier.

In January 1960, during Williams' senior year at Claflin University, he was visiting relatives in New York City. He had read that John F. Kennedy would be at a downtown hotel at a press conference, and went there in hopes of capturing some images. He forgot his press pass, and the hotel security was about to kick him out of the room right as Kennedy was about to come up to the podium. Kennedy told them not to kick him out, and ended up giving Williams his personal address. For the next year, while campaigning all over the United States, Williams became a close acquaintance of Kennedy, and one of his favorite photographers. Williams was one of the few in the press community to be allowed on Kennedy's private 10-seater jet.

He graduated from Claflin in 1960 with a bachelor's degree in art. He studied under painter and sculptor Arthur Rose Sr. there.

Although better known for photography, Williams' painting, art, graphics, and architectural renderings represent proficiency, especially among minimalists. Although at that time, because of his race, he was barred from attending Clemson University in his state to study architecture, he drew plans for several residences; one of which was featured in the June 1977 issue of Ebony; "Space Age Home".

He also documented Harvey Gantt's desegregation of Clemson University in 1963, the 1969 Charleston hospital workers' strike, and the 1968 Orangeburg Massacre. The massacre involved the South Carolina Highway Patrol shooting and killing three African American men and injuring 27 other South Carolina State University students.

Williams worked as the official photographer for the South Carolina branch of the NAACP, South Carolina State University, Claflin University, and National Conference of Black Mayors, Inc. for more than 20 years, beginning in the 1960s.

His work has been exhibited at many institutions and museums, such as Claflin University, University of South Carolina, Columbia Museum of Art, Clemson University, Columbia College, Furman University, Rice Museum in Georgetown, South Carolina State University, and Museum of the New South in Charlotte.

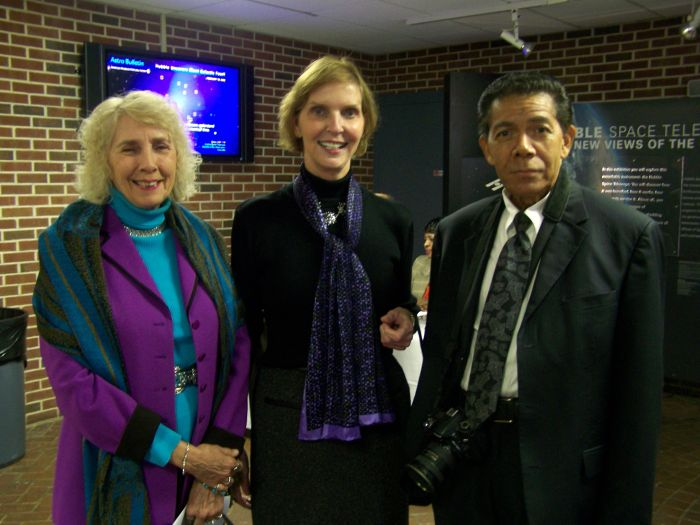
Cecil J. Williams posing for a photo with two visitors to his Civil Rights Museum, 2008

In 2015, Williams invented the FilmToaster, a camera scanning platform and system that digitizes film negatives faster than other methods. In 2019–2020, in collaboration with the Barry and Peggy Goldwater Foundation, Arizona Highways magazine, and Scottsdale's Museum of the West, photographs by Barry Goldwater were on exhibit. All the photos were printed by the FilmToaster.

Williams's work was included in the 2025 exhibition Photography and the Black Arts Movement, 1955–1985 at the National Gallery of Art.

Williams owns a portrait studio, event, and wedding photography business based in Orangeburg, South Carolina. He serves as the director of Historic Preservation at Claflin University. He is a Getty Images contributor and photographer. He also tours the nation giving presentations at conferences, events and institutions about his work during the civil rights movement. He is a member of the American Society of Media Photographers.

== Political activism ==
Williams ran as a candidate in the South Carolina Democratic Party primary for the 1984 United States Senate election in South Carolina. He was the second black person to do so in the state. He lost in a close race to Melvin Purvis.

Williams ran again as a candidate in the Democratic primary preceding the 1996 United States Senate election in South Carolina. He lost to Elliott Springs Close.

== Personal life ==
He holds membership with Delta Chi, the Orangeburg, South Carolina Boulé of Sigma Pi Phi, the oldest African-American fraternity.

Williams lives in Orangeburg, South Carolina. He is married to Barbara Johnson Williams, a retired educator. They met while Barbara was attending college, and he was the university photographer. Going through old photos, they discovered that when Barbara was in high school Williams had taken a picture of her, not knowing who she was.

== Museum ==
In the summer of 2019, Williams opened the Cecil Williams South Carolina Civil Rights Museum to house hundreds of images and artifacts from the civil rights movement. The museum looks like an ultra-modern-day home which Williams designed himself in 1983, 36 years before he made it into his own museum. The theme of the museum is "The South Carolina Events that Changed America". The museum will also double as the neighborhood community center.

== Awards and honors ==
As a Claflin University student, Williams was named an honoree of both Outstanding Young Men of America and Who's Who Among Students in American Colleges & Universities. He was given the 1994 Freedom Fighter Award by the Orangeburg branch of the NAACP. Also in 1994, he received a commendation by the S.C. House of Representatives, introduced by Rep. Gilda Cobb-Hunter.

He received the Presidential Citation in 1995 from Henry N. Tisdale, president of Claflin University. In 2006, he was also the recipient of Claflin University's highest award, the Bythewood Award. The South Carolina African-American Heritage Commission gave him the 2006 "Preserving Our Place in History" Award. In 2016, the Commission presented him with the DeCosta Jr. Trailblazer Award. In 2017, Governor Henry McMaster awarded him the Order of the Palmetto.

In September 2025, Williams appeared with Actively Black creator Lanny Smith during New York Fashion Week.

== Published works ==
=== Books ===
- Freedom and Justice: Four Decades of the Civil Rights Struggle as Seen by a Black Photographer of the Deep South (1995)
- Out-of-the-Box in Dixie: Cecil Williams' Photography of the South Carolina Events that Changed America (2012)
- Orangeburg 1968...: A Place and Time Remembered, co-written with Sonny Dubose (2012)
- Unforgettable All the Memories We Left Behind: The Art, Design, and Photography of Cecil Williams, 1950–2013 (2016)
- Painter Showcase: A Gallery of Modern Portraiture, Beyond the Camera's Capability (2013)
- Images of America - Clarendon County, co-written with two other authors, published by Arcadia Publishing (2002)
- Injustice in Focus: The Civil Rights Photography of Cecil Williams by Claudia Smith Brinson, photographs by Cecil Williams, published by University of South Carolina Press (2024)

=== Documentaries ===
- Freedom and Justice (1996)
- Out of the Box in Dixie (2006)

== See also ==
- Oral History (June 2011)
- List of photographers of the civil rights movement
