= Cecil Williams South Carolina Civil Rights Museum =

Civil rights museum in South Carolina, US

- Location: 1865 Lake Drive in Orangeburg, South Carolina
- Type: History
- Website: www.cecilwilliams.com

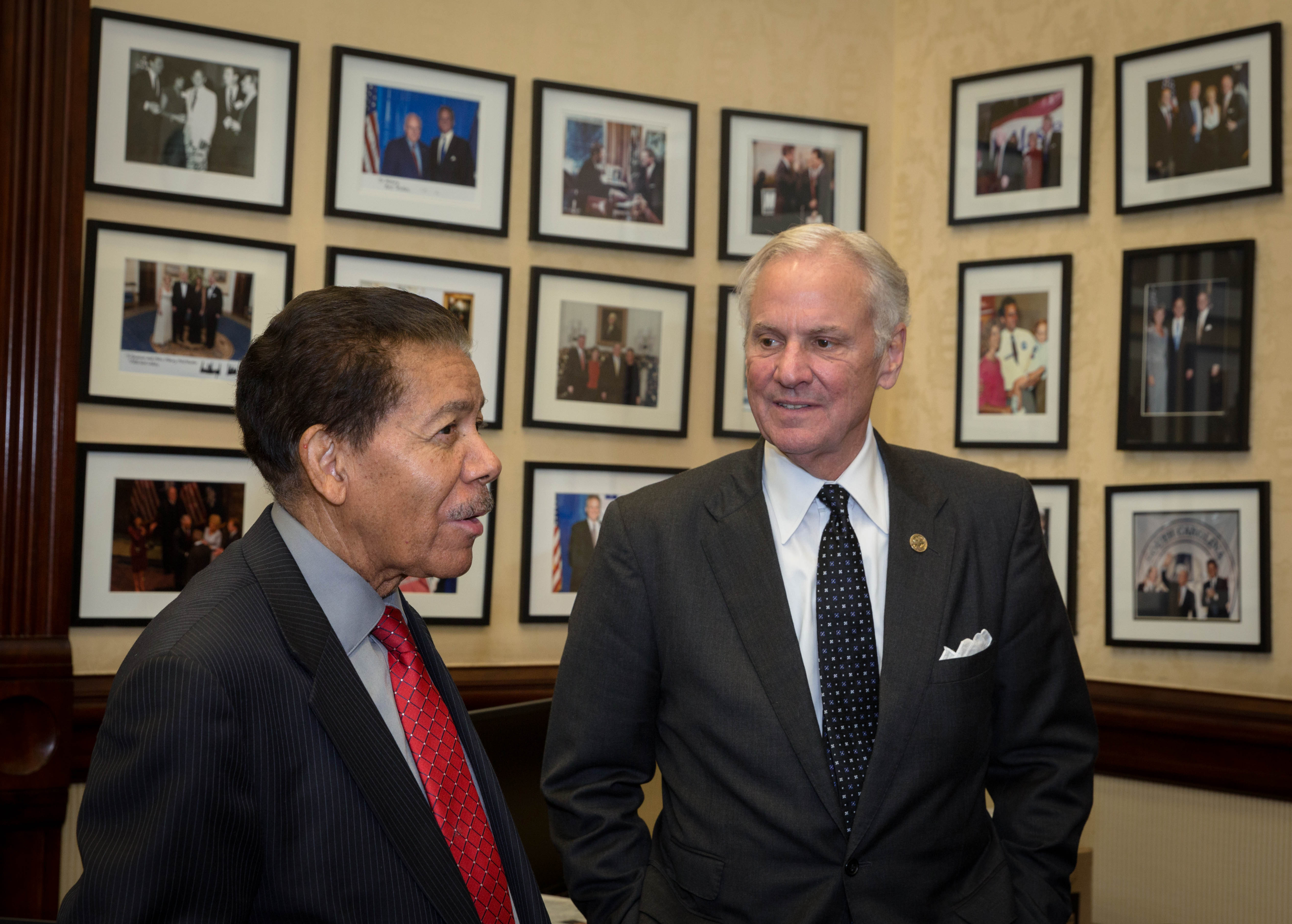
Governor Henry McMaster with Williams in Museum

The South Carolina Civil Rights Museum is a museum in Orangeburg, South Carolina, commemorating the civil rights movement. The curator of the museum and founder is photographer Cecil J. Williams.

== Collection and background ==
The museum holds 14 historical exhibits consisting of 1000 photographs and over 300 artifacts concerning the civil rights movement in South Carolina during the 1950s through 1970. The exhibits focus of major events, such as the Briggs v. Elliott Supreme Court case, the Orangeburg Freedom Movement, Harvey Gantt admission to Clemson University, the Orangeburg Massacre, and the 1969 Charleston hospital strike.

The museum also offers other attractions, including a civil rights movement timeline, an 800-name recognition wall, a digitization laboratory, a sign-in wall, media and presentation center, community meeting room, library, and gift shop.

The 3,500-square-foot museum opened in 2019. It is located in a building Williams designed in 1986.

Initially, Williams funded the museum himself until it generated interests from visitors and attracted regional and national grants. In 2020, the museum was featured on national television, and National Geographic. He received a $100,000 donation from the Chenault Family Foundation for the museum a few months after its opening.

In June 2024, the City/County broke ground for a new 11,000 sq. ft. building to be built at Orangeburg's Railroad Corner, across from two HBCUs, SC State University, and Claflin University.
