= The Regional Medical Center (Orangeburg, South Carolina) =

Coordinates: 33.5402°N 80.8305°W

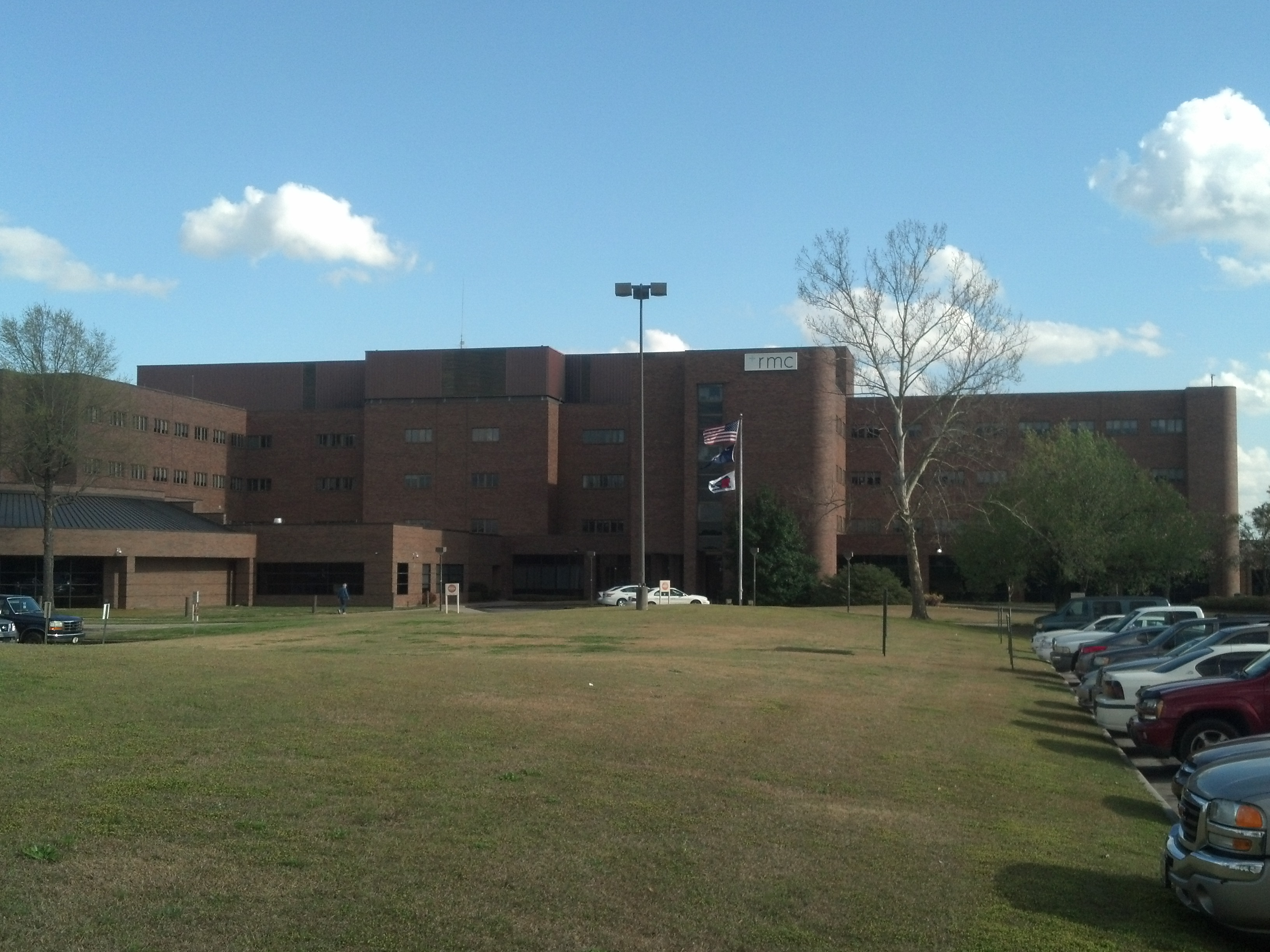
The Regional Medical Center of Orangeburg and Calhoun Counties in Orangeburg, South Carolina

The Regional Medical Center of Orangeburg & Calhoun Counties (or TRMC for short) is a 286-bed non-profit hospital in Orangeburg, South Carolina. It is owned and operated jointly by the counties of Orangeburg and Calhoun, governed by a 17-member board representing both counties. It is the only hospital for the two counties.

== History ==
It was founded as a private hospital named Orangeburg Hospital in 1919 by Dr. Charles A. Mobley, a surgeon whose father and grandfather were also South Carolina surgeons. A nursing school was soon added. In 1924 the hospital had outgrown its original building, so a new hospital was built directly in front of the original one. By 1936 the staff consisted of eleven general medical practitioners and three surgeons.

As of 1952 it was called the Orangeburg Regional Hospital and was owned by the city of Orangeburg. Originally restricted to white patients only, the hospital vowed to desegregate in 1965; but didn't until after the Orangeburg Massacre (1968).

== Current services ==
TRMC is a full-service acute care hospital including a 24-hour emergency room, a cancer center, a dialysis center and similar specialty facilities. It also offers numerous outpatient facilities and community outreach services including wellness education and home care. There are four Healthplex fitness and rehabilitation satellite facilities in the hospital's two-county service area.

The hospital launched several new services in 2013 including a primary care center an outpatient vein clinic, and a mobile services van.
