= South Carolina Department of Public Safety =

- Motto: Protecting - Educating - Serving

Agency overview
- Formed: June 5, 1993

Jurisdictional structure
- Operations jurisdiction: South Carolina, US
- Legal jurisdiction: As per operations jurisdiction

Operational structure
- Headquarters: 10311 Wilson Blvd. Blythewood, SC 29016
- Sworn members: 1478+ (as of 2010)
- Agency executive: Robert G. Woods IV, Director

Website
- Official website

The South Carolina Department of Public Safety (SCDPS) exists to ensure the safety of South Carolina's citizens and visitors. The employees of the Department of Public Safety fulfill this mission by:

- Enforcing the traffic, motor vehicle and motor carrier laws;
- Educating the public on highway safety;
- Administering highway safety and criminal justice grant programs;
- Operating a comprehensive law enforcement training program and certification process;
- Providing security and safety services for public officials as well as state properties.

== Divisions ==
Patch of the South Carolina State Transport Police Division

The SC Department of Public Safety comprises three main divisions:

- South Carolina Highway Patrol Division - Needs help
- South Carolina State Transport Police Division - Colonel Dwayne Wilson
- South Carolina Bureau of Protective Services - Chief Dwayne Brunson

The SC Department of Public Safety also comprises the following offices:

- Office of Highway Safety and Justice Programs
- Office of Human Resources
- Office of Professional Responsibility
- Office of Public Affairs

== See also ==
- List of law enforcement agencies in South Carolina
- South Carolina Highway Patrol

== General references ==
- Official website
- SC Highway Patrol Website
- SC State Transport Police Website
- SC Bureau of Protective Services Website
