= South Carolina Department of Probation, Parole, and Pardon Services =

The South Carolina Department of Probation, Parole, and Pardon Services (SCDPPPS) is a state agency in the state of South Carolina in the United States of America. The agency was formed in 1941 as the South Carolina Probation and Parole Board. At that time, the Board simply made recommendations to the Governor regarding parole matters.

South Carolina Department of Probation Parole and Pardon Services is a cabinet level law enforcement agency of the state of South Carolina; its Director is appointed by the Governor.

Probation and Parole Agents are full state police officers with statewide arrest powers, they provide in addition to their normal probation and parole supervision duties, law enforcement assistance to support local agencies, major events, and natural disasters.

== Training ==
Agents attend the South Carolina Criminal Justice Academy Basic Police Certification course as well as an Agent Basic Academy. They are armed with the .40 Glock Model 22 pistol and must qualify twice a year. Agents have been involved in shooting incidents, recently where a felon was shot and killed, when he attacked an Agent.

== Field Operations ==
Field Operations Division is the largest division in SCDPPPS, it supervises offenders under the Department's jurisdiction through its approximately 475 Probation/Parole Agents located in the 46 county offices. Agents supervise offenders, conduct investigations, and provide law enforcement resources to assist local agencies.

== Special Operations ==
Recently the Special Operations unit has provided law enforcement/protection to the US Presidential Debates held for both the Republican and Democratic candidates, for Myrtle Beach Bike Week, Atlantic Beach Bikefest, and hurricane evacuations and storm shelters. Agents are tasked with the responsibility of assisting in lane reversal on the interstate highways during evacuations and well as policing in the aftermath of the storm.

== Authority ==
The authority Agents have is found in the SC Code of Laws; SECTION 24-21-280. Duties and powers of probation agents; authority to enforce criminal laws.

"A probation agent has, in the execution of his duties, the power to issue an arrest warrant or a citation charging a violation of conditions of supervision, the powers of arrest, and, to the extent necessary, the same right to execute process given by law to sheriffs. A probation agent has the power and authority to enforce the criminal laws of the State. In the performance of his duties of probation, parole, community supervision, and investigation, he is regarded as the official representative of the court, the department, and the board."

== Problems ==
Recent budget cuts, staggering case loads, and the lowest pay but highest requirements for South Carolina Police, has caused serious personnel and operating problems within SCDPPPS. A call for a new funding and reorganization is underway at this time.

== Famous Cases ==
- Stephen Stanko: In 2005, Stanko killed his girlfriend and raped her daughter while serving parole. The Stanko case was featured on CBS 48 Hours Mystery on January 13, 2007.
- James Brown: In 2003, American singer James Brown received a pardon for drug and assault related crimes committed in 1988 and 1998.

== See also ==
- Probation in the United States of America
- Parole in the United States of America
- Atlantic Beach Bikefest
- Law Enforcement Agencies in South Carolina
