= 1984 United States Senate election in South Carolina =

- November 6, 1984
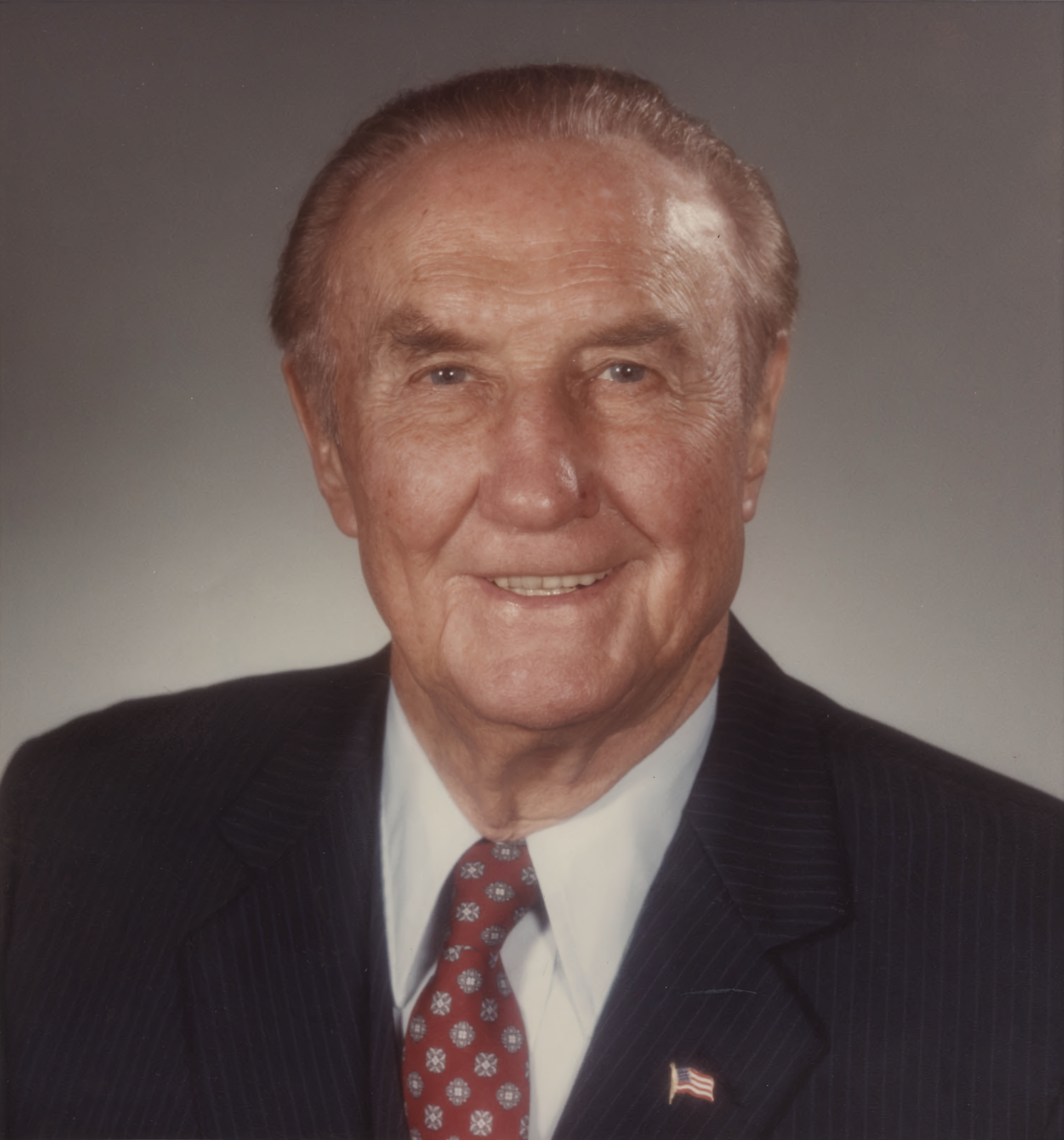

Nominee	Strom Thurmond	Melvin Purvis
Party	Republican	Democratic
Popular vote	644,814	306,982
Percentage	66.79%	31.80%
- County results Thurmond: 40–50% 50–60% 60–70% 70–80% 80–90% Purvis: 40–50%
U.S. senator before election
Strom Thurmond
Republican
Elected U.S. Senator
Strom Thurmond
Republican

The 1984 South Carolina United States Senate election was held on November 6, 1984, to select the U.S. Senator from the state of South Carolina. Popular incumbent Republican Senator Strom Thurmond cruised to re-election against Democratic challenger Melvin Purvis.

== Democratic primary ==
The South Carolina Democratic Party held their primary on June 12, 1984. Melvin Purvis, a minister and the son of famous FBI agent Melvin Purvis, won a close race against photographer Cecil J. Williams. The closeness of the race and the fact that the black candidate did not win propelled Jesse Jackson to request a Justice Department investigation into the primary and he also considered an independent bid for the seat. Governor Richard Riley and 3rd district Representative Butler Derrick flirted with running, but backed down when Thurmond received endorsements from prominent Democrats in South Carolina.

Purvis: 50–60%; 60–70%; Williams: 50–60%; 60–70%

Democratic Primary
Party	Candidate	Votes	%
Democratic	Melvin Purvis	149,730	50.19%
Democratic	Cecil J. Williams	148,586	49.81%
Total votes		298,316	100.00%

== Republican primary ==
The South Carolina Republican Party held their primary on June 12, 1984. Senator Strom Thurmond easily defeated Bob Cunningham to advance to the general election.

Republican Primary
Party	Candidate	Votes	%
Republican	Strom Thurmond (incumbent)	44,662	94.31%
Republican	Bob Cunningham	2,693	5.69%
Total votes		47,355	100.00%

== General election campaign ==
Thurmond received endorsements from former Democratic governor Robert Evander McNair, Charleston mayor Joseph P. Riley Jr., and an assortment of black mayors in the state. He did not face a serious challenge and spent almost $1.5 million on the race whereas Purvis spent less than $10,000. An ironic footnote to the election is the fact that Purvis used Thurmond's age as an issue in the campaign. He claimed Thurmond was too old, yet Purvis died less than two years after the election of a heart attack at age 46.

== General election results ==
South Carolina U.S. Senate Election, 1984
Party	Candidate	Votes	%	±%
Republican	Strom Thurmond (incumbent)	644,814	66.79%	+11.23%
Democratic	Melvin Purvis	306,982	31.80%	−12.60%
Libertarian	Stephen Davis	13,323	1.38%	N/A
Write-in		335	0.03%	N/A
Total votes		965,454	100.00%	
Majority		337,832	34.99%	+23.84%
Turnout		965,454	68.7%	+11.0%
Republican hold				

== See also ==
- 1984 United States Senate elections
- List of United States senators from South Carolina
