= List of law enforcement agencies in South Carolina =

This is a list of law enforcement agencies in the state of South Carolina.

According to the US Bureau of Justice Statistics' 2022 'Census of State and Local Law Enforcement Agencies,' the state had 272 law enforcement agencies employing 11,674 sworn police officers, about 259 for each 100,000 residents.

== State agencies ==
- South Carolina Department of Corrections (SCDC)
  - Office of Inspector General(OIG)
- South Carolina Department of Natural Resources, Law Enforcement Division (SCDNR)
- South Carolina Department of Public Safety (SCDPS)
  - South Carolina Highway Patrol (SCHP)
  - South Carolina State Transport Police Division (SCSTP)
  - South Carolina Bureau of Protective Services (BPS)
- South Carolina Law Enforcement Division (SLED)
- South Carolina State Constable's Office
- South Carolina State Ports Authority Port Police
- South Carolina Department of Probation, Parole, and Pardon Services (SCDPPPS)
- South Carolina Department of Mental Health Public Safety (SCDMHPS)
- South Carolina State Forestry Commission Law Enforcement
- South Carolina Department of Juvenile Justice
- South Carolina Department of Revenue (SCDOR)
  - Criminal Investigation (CI)
  - Protective Services (PS)

== County agencies ==
- Abbeville County Sheriff's Office
- Aiken County Sheriff's Office
- Allendale County Sheriff’s Office
- Anderson County Sheriff’s Office
- Bamberg County Sheriff’s Office
- Barnwell County Sheriff’s Office
- Beaufort County Sheriff’s Office
- Berkeley County Sheriff’s Office
- Calhoun County Sheriff’s Office
- Charleston County Sheriff’s Office
- Cherokee County Sheriff’s Office
- Chester County Sheriff's Office
- Chesterfield County Sheriff’s Office
- Clarendon County Sheriff’s Office
- Colleton County Sheriff's Office
- Darlington County Sheriff’s Office
- Dillon County Sheriff’s Office
- Dorchester County Sheriff’s Office
- Edgefield County Sheriff’s Office
- Fairfield County Sheriff’s Office
- Florence County Sheriff’s Office
- Georgetown County Sheriff’s Office
- Greenville County Sheriff's Office
- Greenwood County Sheriff’s Office
- Hampton County Sheriff’s Office
- Horry County Police Department
- Horry County Sheriff’s Office
- Jasper County Sheriff’s Office
- Kershaw County Sheriff’s Office
- Lancaster County Sheriff’s Office
- Laurens County Sheriff’s Office
- Lee County Sheriff's Office
- Lexington County Sheriff's Department
- Marion County Sheriff’s Office
- Marlboro County Sheriff’s Office
- McCormick County Sheriff’s Office
- Newberry County Sheriff’s Office
- Oconee County Sheriff’s Office
- Orangeburg County Sheriff’s Office
- Pickens County Sheriff’s Office
- Richland County Sheriff's Department
- Saluda County Sheriff's Office
- Spartanburg County Sheriff's Office
- Sumter County Sheriff’s Office
- Union County Sheriff's Office
- Williamsburg County Sheriff's Office
- York County Sheriff's Office

== City and town agencies ==
- Abbeville Police Department
- Aiken Department of Public Safety
- Allendale Police Department
- Anderson Police Department
- Andrews Police Department
- Atlantic Beach Police Department
- Aynor Police Department
- Bamberg Police Department
- Barnwell Police Department
- Batesburg-Leesville Police Department
- Beaufort Police Department
- Belton Police Department
- Bennettsville Police Department
- Bishopville Police Department
- Blacksburg Police Department
- Blackville Police Department
- Bluffton Police Department
- Bonneau Police Department
- Bowman Police Department
- Branchville Police Department
- Briarcliffe Acres Police Department
- Burnettown Police Department
- Calhoun Falls Police Department
- Camden Police Department
- Cameron Police Department
- Campobello Police Department
- Cayce Department of Public Safety
- Central Police Department
- Charleston Police Department
- Chapin Police Department
- Cheraw Police Department
- Chesnee Police Department
- Chester Police Department
- Chesterfield Police Department
- Clemson Police Department
- Clinton Department of Public Safety
- Clio Police Department
- Clover Police Department
- Columbia Police Department
- Conway Police Department
- Cottageville Police Department
- Coward Police Department
- Cowpens Police Department
- Darlington Police Department
- Denmark Police Department
- Dillon Police Department
- Due West Police Department
- Duncan Police Department
- Easley Police Department
- Edgefield Police Department
- Edisto Beach Police Department
- Ehrhardt Police Department
- Elgin Police Department
- Elloree Police Department
- Estill Police Department
- Eutawville Police Department
- Fairfax Police Department
- Florence Police Department
- Folly Beach Department of Public Safety
- Forest Acres Police Department
- Fort Lawn Police Department
- Fort Mill Police Department
- Fountain Inn Police Department
- Gaffney Police Department
- Gaston Police Department
- Georgetown Police Department
- Gifford Police Department
- Goose Creek Police Department
- Great Falls Police Department
- Greeleyville Police Department
- Greenville Police Department
- Greenwood Police Department
- Greer Police Department
- Hampton Police Department
- Hanahan Police Department
- Hardeeville Police Department
- Harleyville Police Department
- Hartsville Police Department
- Hemingway Police Department
- Holly Hill Police Department
- Honea Path Police Department
- Inman Police Department
- Irmo Police Department
- Isle of Palms Police Department
- Iva Police Department
- Jackson Police Department
- Jamestown Police Department
- Johnsonville Police Department
- Johnston Police Department
- Jonesville Police Department
- Kingstree Police Department
- Lake City Police Department
- Lake View Police Department
- Lamar Police Department
- Lancaster Police Department
- Landrum Police Department
- Lane Police Department
- Latta Police Department
- Laurens Police Department
- Lexington Police Department
- Liberty Police Department
- Loris Police Department
- Lyman Police Department
- Lynchburg Police Department
- Manning Police Department
- Marion Police Department
- Mauldin Police Department
- McBee Police Department
- McColl Police Department
- McCormick Police Department
- Moncks Corner Police Department
- Mount Pleasant Police Department
- Mullins Police Department
- Myrtle Beach Police Department
- New Ellenton Police Department
- Newberry Police Department
- Nichols Police Department
- Ninety Six Police Department
- North Police Department
- North Augusta Department of Public Safety
- North Charleston Police Department
- North Myrtle Beach Police Department
- Norway Police Department
- Olanta Police Department
- Olar Police Department
- Orangeburg Department of Public Safety
- Pacolet Police Department
- Pageland Police Department
- Pamplico Police Department
- Pawleys Island Police Department
- Pelion Police Department
- Pendleton Police Department
- Perry Police Department
- Pickens Police Department
- Pine Ridge Police Department
- Port Royal Police Department
- Prosperity Police Department
- Quinby Police Department
- Ridge Spring Police Department
- Ridgeland Police Department
- Ridgeville Police Department
- Rock Hill Police Department
- Rowesville Police Department
- Salem Police Department
- Salley Department of Public Safety
- Saluda Police Department
- Santee Police Department
- Scranton Police Department
- Sellers Police Department
- Seneca Police Department
- Simpsonville Police Department
- Society Hill Police Department
- South Congaree Police Department
- Spartanburg Police Department
- Springdale Police Department
- Springfield Police Department
- St. George Police Department
- St. Matthews Police Department
- St. Stephen Police Department
- Sullivan’s Island Police Department
- Summerton Police Department
- Summerville Police Department
- Sumter Police Department
- Surfside Beach Police Department
- Swansea Police Department
- Tega Cay Police Department
- Timmonsville Police Department
- Travelers Rest Police Department
- Trenton Police Department
- Union Department of Public Safety
- Varnville Police Department
- Wagener Police Department
- Walhalla Police Department
- Walterboro Police Department
- Ware Shoals Police Department
- Wellford Police Department
- West Columbia Police Department
- West Pelzer Police Department
- West Union Police Department
- Westminster Police Department
- Whitmire Police Department
- Williamston Police Department
- Williston Police Department
- Winnsboro Department of Public Safety
- Woodruff Police Department
- Yemassee Police Department
- York Police Department

== College agencies ==
- Allen University Police Department
- Benedict College Police Department
- Bob Jones University Police Department
- Clemson University Police Department
- Coastal Carolina University Department of Public Safety
- Denmark Technical College Department of Public Safety
- Erskine College Police Department
- Francis Marion University Police Department
- Furman University Police Department
- Greenville Technical College Police Department
- Lander University Police Department
- Limestone University Police Department
- Medical University of South Carolina Department of Public Safety
- Midlands Technical College Campus Police
- Orangeburg-Calhoun Technical College Police Department
- Presbyterian College Campus Police Department
- South Carolina State University Police Department
- Spartanburg Community College Police Department
- Spartanburg Methodist College Campus Safety Department
- The Citadel Department of Public Safety
- Tri County Technical College Campus Safety
- Trident Technical College Department of Public Safety
- University of South Carolina-Aiken Police Department
- University of South Carolina-Beaufort Department of Public Safety
- University of South Carolina Police Department
- University of South Carolina Upstate Department of Public Safety
- Winthrop University Police Department
- Wofford College Campus Safety

== Other agencies ==
- Charleston County Aviation Authority Police Department
- Columbia Metro Housing Authority Police Department
- Columbia Metropolitan Airport Police Department
- Dorn VA Medical Center Police Department
- Florence Regional Airport Department of Public Safety
- Joint Base Charleston Security Forces
- Lexington Medical Center Police Department
- Marine Corps Air Station Beaufort Provost Marshal

== Former agencies ==
- Bethune Police Department
