= 1996 United States Senate election in South Carolina =

- November 5, 1996
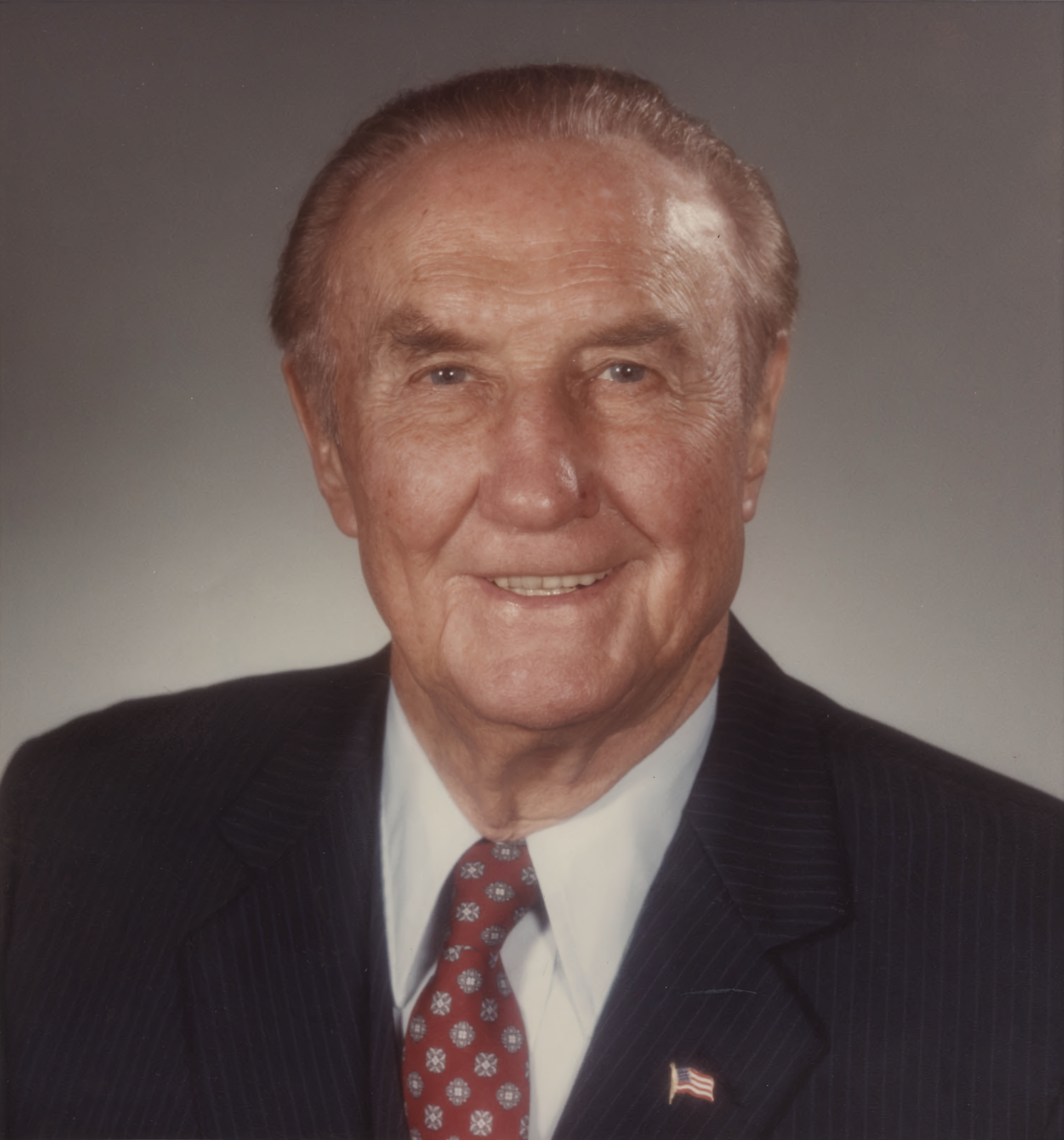

Nominee	Strom Thurmond	Elliott Close
Party	Republican	Democratic
Popular vote	620,626	511,226
Percentage	53.38%	43.99%
- County results Thurmond: 40–50% 50–60% 60–70% 70–80% Close: 40–50% 50–60% 60–70%
U.S. senator before election
Strom Thurmond
Republican
Elected U.S. Senator
Strom Thurmond
Republican

The 1996 South Carolina United States Senate election was held on November 5, 1996, to select the U.S. Senator from the state of South Carolina. Incumbent Republican Senator Strom Thurmond won re-election against Democratic challenger Elliott Springs Close for an eighth term in office. The margin, however, was one of the closest in Thurmond's 48-year Senate career. At the age of 93 years, 11 months and 3 days, Thurmond became the oldest person ever to be re-elected to the United States Senate. He served out the entirety of his final term and left the Senate on January 3, 2003, at age 100 years and 29 days.

== Democratic primary ==
The South Carolina Democratic Party held their primary on June 11, 1996. Elliott Springs Close, a 43-year-old political novice from Columbia, entered the Democratic primary and faced opposition from black photographer Cecil J. Williams. Close was a wealthy heir of a textile business, a brother-in-law of President Clinton's chief of staff Erskine Bowles, who styled himself as a fiscal conservative and a social moderate.

Democratic Primary
Party	Candidate	Votes	%
Democratic	Elliott Springs Close	102,953	62.12%
Democratic	Cecil J. Williams	62,783	37.88%
Total votes		165,736	100.00%

== Republican primary ==
The South Carolina Republican Party held their primary on June 11, 1996, and the contest pitted 93-year-old incumbent Senator Strom Thurmond against two relatively unknown candidates. Secretary of State James Miles was the only Republican statewide official who had not endorsed Strom Thurmond and it was rumored that he was considering entering the primary. Thurmond's press secretary, Mark Goodin, criticized Miles for not endorsing Thurmond and told those who contributed to Miles campaign fund that they were contributing to a contest against Thurmond, not the state's other Senator, Democrat Fritz Hollings. Miles soon endorsed Thurmond which left Harold G. Worley, a state representative from Myrtle Beach, and Charlie Thompson, an educator from Charleston, as the only opponents to Thurmond's election. Worley spent $600,000 of his own money and based his campaign almost solely on Thurmond's age. He questioned Thurmond's mental ability to make decisions and whether he had the capacity to fill out a full term, which would put Thurmond at one hundred years old. Nevertheless, Thurmond cruised to a primary victory and Worley only carried Horry County.

Republican Primary
Party	Candidate	Votes	%
Republican	Strom Thurmond (incumbent)	132,145	60.62%
Republican	Harold G. Worley	65,666	30.12%
Republican	Charlie Thompson	20,185	9.26%
Total votes		217,996	100.00%

== General election campaign ==
The race between Thurmond and Close boiled down to whether Thurmond could retain the affection of voters who had re-elected him over and over or whether Close could convince the voters that Thurmond's age was an impediment to effective service for the state. Thurmond therefore adopted a non-confrontational approach to the campaign. He chose to not debate Close, not only because he had not debated an opponent since Olin D. Johnston in the 1950 Senate election, but also because it would only emphasize the 50-year age difference between the candidates. Thurmond energetically traversed the state greeting the voters and pointed out to them that with his experience, he could more effectively serve the state than a political neophyte.

Close ran television advertisements that highlighted the age issue by declaring that although Thurmond had admirably served the state for over fifty years, it was time for someone new to represent South Carolina. He poured almost a million dollars into his campaign, but his campaign never remained focused. For instance, trying to not appear too wealthy, Close traded his fancy foreign car for a Cadillac. He acquired a speeding ticket in the Cadillac and a newspaper criticized him for driving a luxury automobile. Frustrated, Close then switched his Cadillac for a Buick. Another instance of his jumbled campaign came when said that his family's textile factories did not lay off an employee during the Great Depression. Yet a week after this statement, three mills were closed and 850 employees were out of work.

By the day of the election on November 5, polls had shown that the voters thought it was time for Thurmond to retire, but they did not want to throw him out of office. Close spent almost a million dollars of his fortune to defeat Thurmond and his decision to raise a million dollars from outside sources was attacked by the Thurmond campaign of a lack of confidence by Close in his own campaign. Thurmond spent a little more than $2.6 million on the race and was said to have "dodged the bullet" by The State reporter Lee Bandy after his victory. The campaign aides of Thurmond stated he could have been defeated had either former Governor Richard Riley or 5th district congressman John M. Spratt, Jr. run against him.

== Election results ==
South Carolina U.S. Senate Election, 1996
Party	Candidate	Votes	%	±%
Republican	Strom Thurmond (incumbent)	620,326	53.38%	−10.83%
Democratic	Elliott Springs Close	511,226	43.99%	+11.47%
Libertarian	Richard T. Quillian	12,994	1.12%	−0.72%
Reform	Peter J. Ashy	9,741	0.84%	N/A
Natural Law	Annette C. Estes	7,697	0.66%	N/A
Write-in		141	0.01%	N/A
Total votes		1,162,125	100.00%	
Majority		109,100	9.39%	−22.30%
Turnout		1,162,125	64.0%	+8.8%
Republican hold				

== See also ==
- 1996 United States Senate elections
- List of United States senators from South Carolina
