= South Carolina Highway Patrol =

South Carolina state law enforcement agency

- Patch of South Carolina Highway Patrol
- Abbreviation: SCHP
- Motto: Courtesy-Efficiency-Service

Agency overview
- Formed: 1930; 96 years ago
- Employees: 800+ (as of 2024)

Jurisdictional structure
- Operations jurisdiction: South Carolina, USA
- SCHP Troop Map
- Area: 32,020 square miles (82,900 km^{2})
- Population: 5,118,425
- Legal jurisdiction: Statewide
- Governing body: South Carolina Department of Public Safety
- General nature: Civilian police

Operational structure
- Headquarters: Blythewood, South Carolina
- Troopers: 478 (as of 2024)
- Civilian members: 180 (as of 2004)
- Agency executive: Colonel Chris Williamson, Commander
- Parent agency: South Carolina Department of Public Safety
- Special Units: ACE/Motorcycle/K9; MAIT; CERT; Insurance Enforcement

Facilities
- Troops: 7

Website
- Official website

The South Carolina Highway Patrol (SCHP) is the highway patrol agency for South Carolina, which has jurisdiction anywhere in the state except for federal or military installations. The Highway Patrol was created in 1930 and is an organization with a rank structure similar to the armed forces. The mission of the South Carolina Highway Patrol includes enforcing the rules and regulations in order to ensure road way safety and reducing crime as outlined by South Carolina law. The Highway Patrol is the largest division of the South Carolina Department of Public Safety and its headquarters is located in Blythewood. This department also includes the South Carolina State Transport Police Division, and the South Carolina Bureau of Protective Services.

The Highway Patrol has many responsibilities. The primary job of the rank-and-file trooper is traffic law enforcement. This includes traffic collision investigation, issuing warning tickets and citations for traffic violations, and finding, arresting, and processing impaired drivers. A state trooper is a sworn peace officer, and although their primary duty is traffic enforcement, they can perform other law enforcement functions.

== History ==
On February 8, 1968, SCHP officers fired on anti-segregation protesters on the campus of the South Carolina State University in Orangeburg. Three were killed and 28 others were injured. This event came to be called the Orangeburg massacre.

== Patrol structure ==
SCHP Commander

- SCHP Deputy Commander of Administration
- SCHP Deputy Commander of Operations
- Field Operations - Region One
  - Troop One
  - Troop Two
  - Troop Three
  - Troop Four
- Field Operations - Region Two
  - Troop Five
  - Troop Six
  - Troop Seven
- Field Operations
  - Troop Eight - Area Coordinated Enforcement (ACE)
  - Troop Nine - Multidisciplinary Accident Investigation Team
  - Troop Ten
    - Community Relations, Recruiting and FOIA Unit
    - Employment Unit
    - Regulatory Compliance Unit
    - Insurance Enforcement Unit
    - Training Unit
    - Central Evidence Facility
    - Telecommunications
- Administrative Operations

== Highway Patrol duties ==
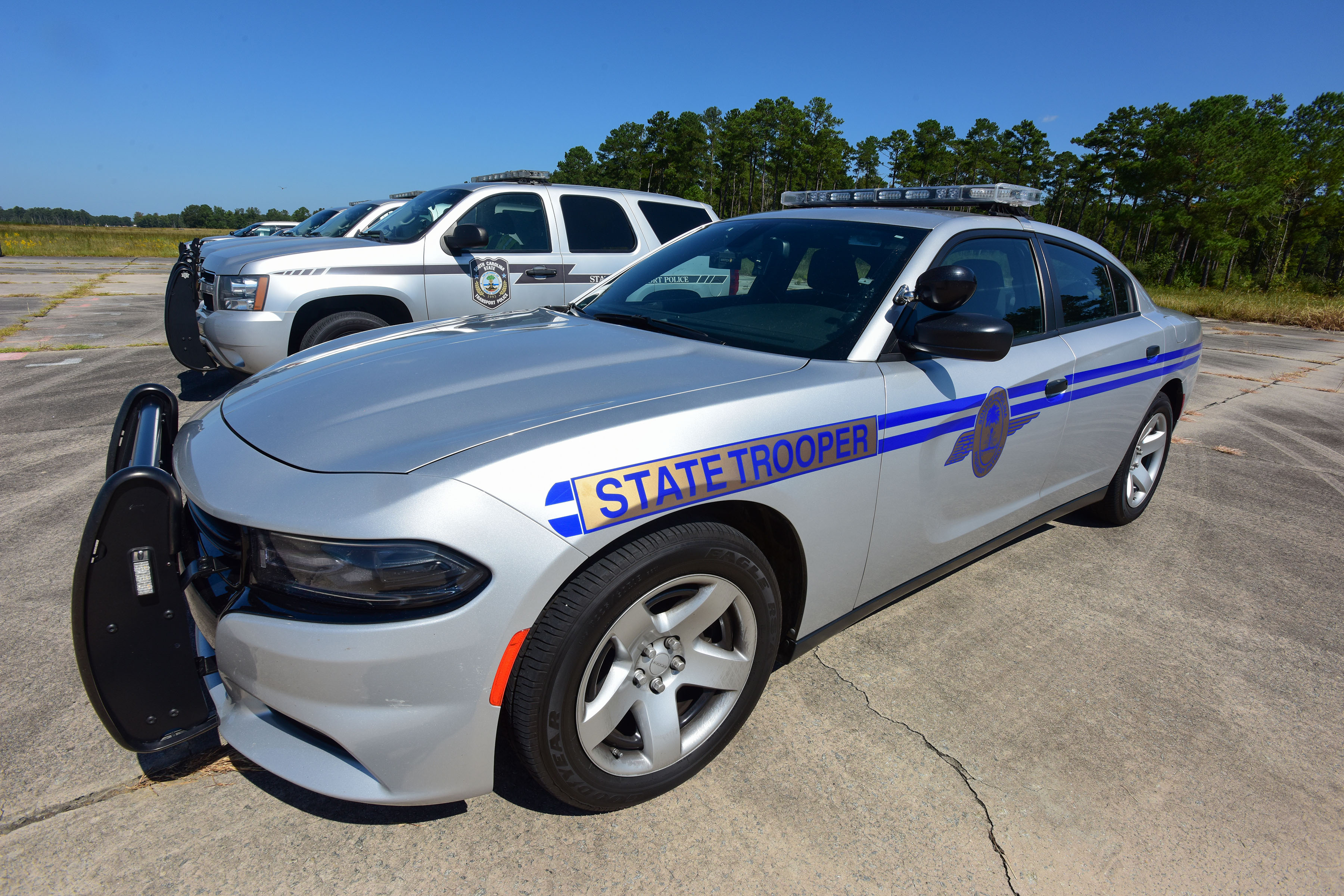
Marked SCHP patrol vehicles are usually silver with two blue lines on either side. Flashing lights are typically all blue.

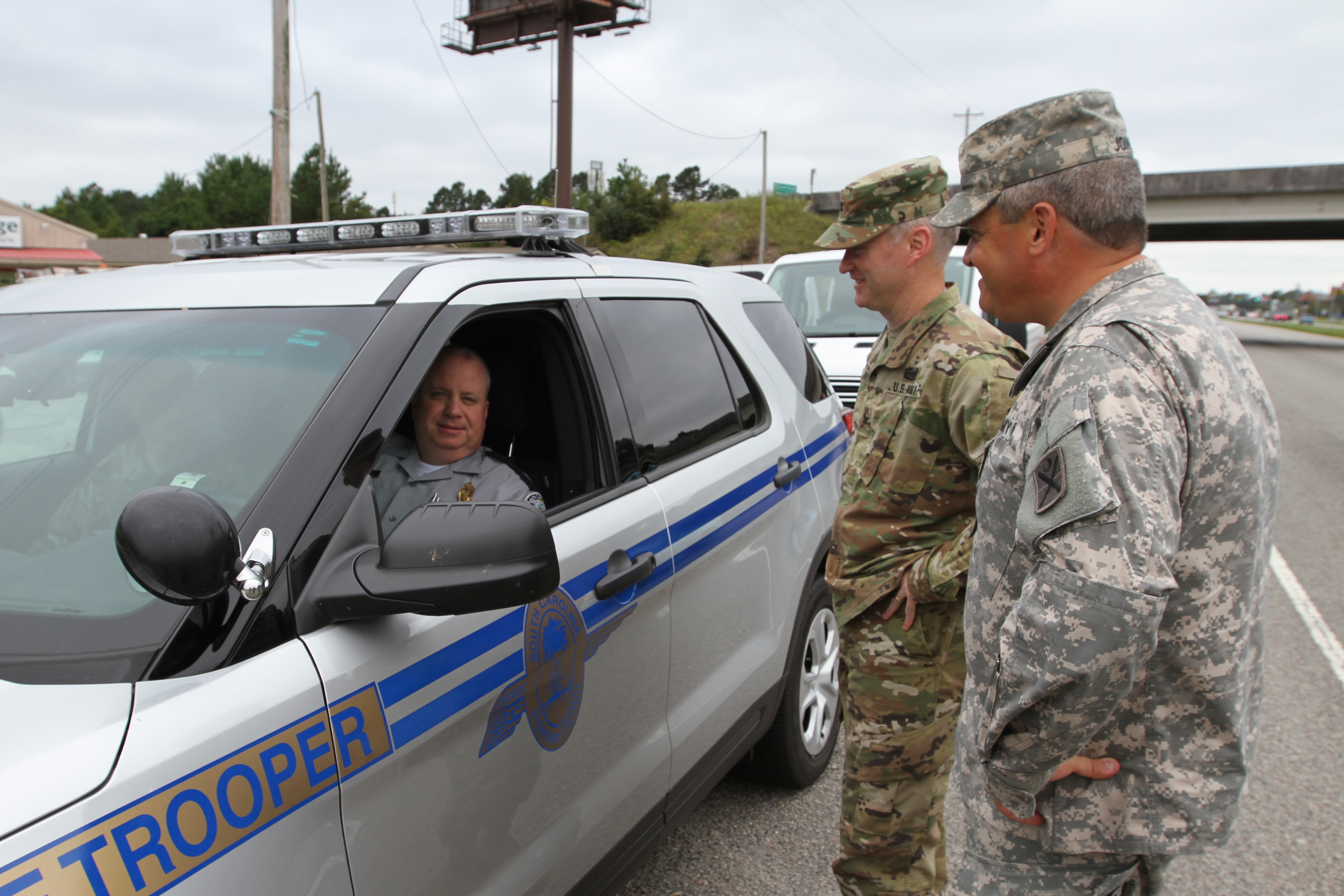
SCHP trooper with national guardsmen.

The agency has specific jurisdiction over all South Carolina state highways, U.S. Highways, Interstate highways in the state and all public roads. Local city police or the counties sheriff's department having a contract with an incorporated city have responsibility to investigate and enforce traffic laws in incorporated cities. However, the SCHP can still enforce traffic laws on any public road anywhere in the state regardless if it is in an incorporated or unincorporated city. SCHP has authority over any incident that would require a Trooper's response.

SCHP troopers are responsible for investigating and disposing of car accidents, debris, dead animals and other impediments to the free flow of traffic. They are often the first government officials at the scene of an accident (or obstruction), and in turn summon EMS/Fire (although, their dispatch often does this long before they are on scene), tow truck drivers or SCDOT personnel. The SCHP files traffic collision reports for state highways and within unincorporated areas. The patrol has around 800 employees, of whom 650 are sworn Troopers, and 150 civilians.

Also see Section 1. Chapter 11 of Title 6 of the 1976 Code. This law provides extra information as to what entity has jurisdiction on emergency incidents. https://www.scstatehouse.gov/code/title6.php

== Specialized units ==
- The Multi-disciplinary Accident Investigation Team (MAIT): investigates complicated vehicle crashes, using state-of-the-art technology and analysis to reconstruct the scene.
- The Civil Emergency Response Team (CERT): responds to civil emergencies using specialized training, tactics and equipment.
- The ACE (Area Coordinated Enforcement) Team: The Area Coordinated Enforcement Team (ACE) is a specialized unit of the South Carolina Highway Patrol that uses crash data to identify areas most in need of special enforcement to curb crashes caused by aggressive driving, speeding and other unsafe driving behaviors..
- The Telecommunications Centers: work dispatching troopers to incident scenes and assist the public with emergency calls.
- The Insurance Enforcement Unit: works closely with the Department of Motor Vehicles to identify uninsured drivers and take them off the highways.
- Community Relations Office: includes uniformed troopers and civilian staff around the state dedicated to educating the public and media about the Highway Patrol and highway safety.
- Governor's Security Detail: works with the State Law Enforcement Division to provide security for the South Carolina Governor and the governor's family.
- Emergency Management Unit: monitors emergency traffic issues and coordinates hurricane evacuation efforts

== Rank structure ==
The SCHP uses a paramilitary rank structure.

Insignia	Rank title	Information
	SCHP Commander (Rank Of Colonel)	The Commander of the South Carolina Highway Patrol holds the Rank Of Colonel.
	Deputy Commanders (Rank Of Lieutenant Colonel)	There are two Deputy Commanders.They are responsible for overseeing Operations and Administrations.They hold the Rank Of Lieutenant Colonel
	Major	There are four Majors.They are responsible for overseeing Field Operations
	Captain	Captains command one of the ten Troops.
	Lieutenant	Lieutenants command a post or station.
	First Sergeant	First Sergeants are in command of a post or station.
	Sergeant	Sergeants are assistant post commander.
	Corporal	Corporals act as field supervisors.
	Master Trooper	Master Troopers have served for at least ten years.
	Lance Corporal	Lance Corporals have served for at least five years.
	Senior Trooper	Senior Troopers have served for at least three years.
	Trooper First Class	Trooper First Class has served for at least eighteen months.
	Trooper	The initial SCHP rank.

== Demographics ==
- Male: 97%
- Female: 3%
- White: 85%
- African-American/Black: 14%
- Asian: 1%

== In the line of duty ==
Throughout the years of the Patrol, 52 Troopers have died performing their duty.

Category	Number
Automobile crash	14
Gunfire	19
Heart attack	1
Motorcycle crash	10
Struck by vehicle	3
Vehicle pursuit	4
Vehicular assault	1

=== Fallen Troopers ===
Officer	Date of death	Details
TFC Dennis Ricks	August 13, 2025	Struck by vehicle
Trooper Daniel Keith Rebman, Jr.	October 24, 2017	Automobile crash
Corporal D. Kevin Cusack	March 27, 2010	Automobile crash
Lance Corporal Jonathan S. Nash	September 19, 2009	Motorcycle crash
Lance Corporal James D. Haynes	February 1, 2008	Automobile crash
Senior Trooper Jonathan W. Parker	May 16, 2005	Vehicular assault
Corporal Kenneth Jeffery Johnson	July 7, 2002	Gunfire
Senior Trooper Michael Joseph Rao	June 12, 2002	Struck by vehicle
Trooper Eric Francis Nicholson	December 6, 2000	Gunfire
Lance Corporal David Travis Bailey	April 5, 2000	Automobile crash
Lance Corporal Jacob Ham Jr.	February 8, 1998	Heart attack
First Sergeant Frankie Lee Lingard	December 31, 1997	Gunfire
Lance Corporal Randall Scott Hewitt	June 23, 1996	Automobile crash
Lance Corporal Michael Allen Chappell	April 17, 1995	Automobile crash
Trooper Randall Lamar Hester	April 20, 1994	Vehicle pursuit
Lance Corporal Mark Hunter Coates	November 20, 1992	Gunfire
Trooper Hardy Merle Godbold	February 28, 1992	Vehicle pursuit
Trooper David Hunter O'Brien	December 14, 1991	Automobile crash
Trooper Marvin L. Titus	November 12, 1991	Gunfire
Trooper Harry McKinley Coker Jr.	June 21, 1989	Struck by vehicle
TFC George Tillman Radford	October 29, 1988	Gunfire
TFC Robert Paul Perry Jr.	April 15, 1987	Vehicle pursuit
TFC Bruce Kenneth Smalls	September 27, 1985	Gunfire
Corporal John R. Clinton	May 24, 1983	Gunfire
PFC David Lee Alverson	November 13, 1981	Automobile crash
Sergeant Robert Aaron Mobley	July 19, 1979	Gunfire
PFC William Edward Peeples	June 8, 1979	Gunfire
PFC Ben Wesley Strickland III	May 31, 1974	Gunfire
Patrolman Fulton House Anthony	March 10, 1973	Gunfire
Patrolman Roy Odes Caffey	October 8, 1972	Gunfire
Patrolman James Amechie Traylor	December 25, 1970	Gunfire
Patrolman Alfred Alexander Thomason	July 27, 1970	Automobile crash
Corporal Richard Varn Woods	August 19, 1969	Gunfire
Patrolman Marion Charles Steele	September 10, 1966	Gunfire
Patrolman John Ray Riddle	January 15, 1961	Automobile crash
Corporal Henry C. Yonce	May 19, 1959	Automobile crash
Patrolman Harry Boyd Ray	September 7, 1958	Gunfire
Patrolman Arnold R. Carter	June 18, 1956	Vehicle pursuit
Patrolman Albert T. Sealy	October 5, 1950	Automobile crash
Patrolman Norris Nettles	January 4, 1942	Gunfire
Patrolman Joseph P. Monroe	September 28, 1941	Motorcycle crash
Patrolman George Gibbs Broome	May 28, 1941	Automobile crash
Patrolman Harlan M. Smith	September 23, 1940	Motorcycle crash
Patrolman Walter T. Bell	February 4, 1939	Automobile crash
Patrolman L. Lawson Rhodes	July 13, 1938	Motorcycle crash
Patrolman Kenneth Earl McNeill	January 2, 1937	Motorcycle crash
Patrolman Edward M. Hennecy	November 19, 1935	Motorcycle crash
Patrolman Edwin D. Milam	December 25, 1934	Gunfire
Patrolman Hansford McKinley Reeves	February 15, 1934	Motorcycle crash
Patrolman John Davenport Cunningham	June 1, 1933	Motorcycle crash
Patrolman William Pierre Lancaster	June 9, 1932	Motorcycle crash
Patrolman Ralph W. McCracken	October 12, 1931	Motorcycle crash

== Special programs ==
Auxiliary Trooper Program

- Auxiliary Troopers assist highly trained, seasoned state troopers in enforcement support on daily patrols; to assist with traffic and crowd control at special events; and provide support during natural disasters such as hurricanes.
- Auxiliary Troopers receive more than 130 hours of training for certification by the South Carolina Highway Patrol.
- To maintain auxiliary status, the Auxiliary Trooper serves minimum of 20 hours per month or 60 hours each quarter of the calendar year.

Fatality Victims Memorial

- The Fatality Victims Memorial is a website that families of those persons killed on South Carolina highways can put information about their loved ones.

Child Safety Seatbelt Demonstration

Trooper Public Speaking Program

== Vehicles used ==
The South Carolina Highway Patrol use many different varieties of marked, semi-marked, and unmarked vehicles, like many other law enforcement agencies in South Carolina and the rest of the United States. Most vehicles are a part of fleets, usually late 1990s to as recent as 2010 Ford Crown Victoria or the modified versions of the Crown Vic (as it is commonly called), The Ford Police Interceptor. Also used are 2007 to present Dodge Charger of modified LX and SRT-8 body styles, and starting in 2012, the Ford Taurus and Ford Explorer, and Chevrolet Tahoe. They also used Chevrolet Caprices, Ford Mustang SSP's, and Ford Crown Victorias.

== Sidearm ==
In 2017, the South Carolina Highway Patrol started issuing the Glock 17M chambered in 9mm.

Troopers were previously issued the Glock 37 chambered in .45 GAP and the Glock 22 chambered in .40 S&W.

The last revolver used was the Smith & Wesson Model 66 .357 magnum which is a derivative of the Smith & Wesson Model 19

Now uses the Glock 45 with a AimPoint red dot and weapon light.

== See also ==
- Orangeburg massacre
- List of law enforcement agencies in South Carolina
- State police
- State patrol
- Highway patrol
- Mark H. Coates Highway
