= List of people executed in South Carolina =

The following is a list of people executed by the U.S. state of South Carolina since capital punishment was resumed in the United States in 1976.

Since the 1976 U.S. Supreme Court decision of Gregg v. Georgia, a total of 50 people have been executed in South Carolina. All of the people executed were convicted of murder. Of the 50 people executed, 40 were executed via lethal injection, 7 via electrocution, and 3 via firing squad.

From 1912 to 1986, executions were carried out at the Central Correctional Institution in Columbia. From 1990 onwards, executions occur at the Broad River Correctional Institution in Columbia.

== List of people executed in South Carolina since 1976 ==
No.	Name	Race	Age	Sex	Date of execution	County	Method	Victim(s)	Governor
1	Joseph Carl Shaw	White	29	M	January 11, 1985	Richland	Electrocution	Tommy Taylor and Carlotta Hartness (Note: Also killed Betty Swank, but was executed for killing Taylor and Hartness.)	Richard Riley
2	James Terry Roach	White	25	M	January 10, 1986 (Note: This was the last execution to be held at the Central Correctional Institution in downtown Columbia. The prison complex, on the banks of the Congaree River, has since closed and been demolished.)	Richland	Electrocution	Tommy Taylor and Carlotta Hartness	Richard Riley
3	Ronald Raymond Woomer	White	35	M	April 27, 1990 (Note: This was the first execution held at the Broad River Correctional Institution in Columbia.)	Horry	Electrocution	4 murder victims (Note: The 4 victims were: John Turner, Arnie Lee Richardson, Earldean Wright, and Della Louise Sellers. Woomer was executed for killing Sellers.)	Carroll Campbell
4	Donald Henry Gaskins	White	58	M	September 6, 1991 (Note: This was the last execution in the state when electrocution was mandatory.)	Richland	Electrocution	15 murder victims (Note: The 15 victims were: Hazel Brazell, Janice Kirby, Patricia Ann Alsbrook, Martha Ann Dicks, Doreen Hope Dempsey, Robin Michelle Dempsey, Johnny Sellers, Jessie Ruth Judy, Silas Barnwell Yates, Dianne Neely, Avery Leroy Howard, Kim Gehlken, Dennis Bellamy, John Henry Knight, and Rudolph Tyner. Gaskins was executed for killing Tyner.)	Carroll Campbell
5	Sylvester Lewis Adams	Black	39	M	August 18, 1995 (Note: Earlier in the year, the General Assembly changed capital punishment rules to allow inmates a choice between lethal injection or electrocution for means of execution.)	York	Lethal injection	Bryan Chambers	David Beasley
6	Robert South	White	51	M	May 31, 1996	Lexington	Lethal injection	West Columbia Police Officer Daniel Wayne Cogburn	David Beasley
7	Fred H. Kornahrens III	White	47	M	July 19, 1996	Charleston	Lethal injection	Patti Jo Kornahrens, Jason Avant, and Harry Wilkerson	David Beasley
8	Michael Rian Torrence	White	35	M	September 6, 1996	Lexington	Lethal injection	Dennis Lollis (Note: Also killed Charles Alan Bush and Cynthia Williams, but was executed for killing Lollis.)	David Beasley
9	Larry Gene Bell	White	46	M	October 4, 1996	Lexington	Electrocution	Sharon Faye Smith and Debra May Helmick (Note: Also killed Sandee Elaine Cornett, but was executed for killing Smith and Helmick.)	David Beasley
10	Doyle Cecil Lucas	White	41	M	November 15, 1996	York	Lethal injection	Bill Reyfield and Evelyn Reyfield	David Beasley
11	Frank Middleton Jr.	Black	33	M	November 22, 1996	Charleston	Lethal injection	Shirley Mae Mack and Janell Garner	David Beasley
12	Michael Eugene Elkins	White	41	M	June 13, 1997	Jasper	Lethal injection	Patricia Whitt	David Beasley
13	Earl Matthews Jr.	Black	32	M	November 7, 1997	Charleston	Lethal injection	Lucia Aimar	David Beasley
14	John David Arnold Jr.	White	43	M	March 6, 1998	Beaufort	Lethal injection	Betty Jean Gardner	David Beasley
15	John Herman Plath	White	43	M	July 10, 1998	Beaufort	Lethal injection	Betty Jean Gardner	David Beasley
16	Sammy Roberts	White	40	M	September 25, 1998	Berkeley	Lethal injection	Bill Spain, Kenneth Krause, and Louis Cakley	David Beasley
17	Larry Gilbert	Black	43	M	December 4, 1998	Lexington	Lethal injection	Ralph Samuel Stoudemire	David Beasley
18	J.D. Gleaton	Black	53	M	December 4, 1998	Lexington	Lethal injection	Ralph Samuel Stoudemire	David Beasley
19	Louis Joe Truesdale Jr.	Black	40	M	December 11, 1998	Lancaster	Lethal injection	Rebecca Ann Eudy	David Beasley
20	Andrew Lavern Smith (Note: Andrew Lavern Smith was the 500th person to be executed in the United States since the death penalty was reinstated in 1976.)	Black	38	M	December 18, 1998	Anderson	Lethal injection	4 murder victims (Note: The 4 victims were: David Evan Craig, Nirad Jay Patel, Christy Johnson, and Corrie Johnson. Smith was executed for killing the Johnsons.)	David Beasley
21	Ronnie Howard	Black	40	M	January 8, 1999	Greenville	Lethal injection	Chinh Thi Nguyen Le	David Beasley
22	Joseph Ernest Atkins	Native American	51	M	January 22, 1999	Charleston	Lethal injection	Karen Patterson and Benjamin Atkins (Note: Also killed Charles Atkins, but was executed for killing Karen and Benjamin.)	Jim Hodges
23	Leroy Joseph Drayton	Black	44	M	November 12, 1999	Charleston	Lethal injection	Rhonda Darlene Smith	Jim Hodges
24	David Rocheville	White	31	M	December 3, 1999	Spartanburg	Lethal injection	Alexander George Hopps and James Todd Green	Jim Hodges
25	Kevin Dean Young	Black	32	M	November 3, 2000	Anderson	Lethal injection	Dennis Ray Hepler	Jim Hodges
26	Richard Charles Johnson	White	39	M	May 3, 2002	Jasper	Lethal injection	SCHP Trooper Bruce Kenneth Smalls (Note: Also killed Daniel Swanson, but was executed for killing Smalls.)	Jim Hodges
27	Anthony Green	Black	37	M	August 23, 2002	Charleston	Lethal injection	Susan Babich	Jim Hodges
28	Michael Joseph Passaro	White	40	M	September 13, 2002	Horry	Lethal injection	Maggie Passaro	Jim Hodges
29	David Clayton Hill	White	39	M	March 19, 2004	Georgetown	Lethal injection	Georgetown Police Officer Spencer Guerry	Mark Sanford
30	Jerry Bridwell McWee	White	51	M	April 16, 2004	Aiken	Lethal injection	John Perry (Note: Also killed David Willis, but was executed for killing Perry.)	Mark Sanford
31	Jason Scott Byram	White	38	M	April 23, 2004	Richland	Lethal injection	Julie Johnson	Mark Sanford
32	James Neil Tucker	White	47	M	May 28, 2004	Calhoun	Electrocution	Rosa Lee Oakley and Shannon Lynn Mellon	Mark Sanford
33	Richard Longworth	White	36	M	April 15, 2005	Spartanburg	Lethal injection	Alexander George Hopps and James Todd Green	Mark Sanford
34	Hastings Arthur Wise	Black	51	M	November 4, 2005	Aiken	Lethal injection	4 murder victims (Note: The 4 victims were: Charles Griffeth, David Moore, Leonard Filyaw, and Sheryl Wood.)	Mark Sanford
35	Shawn Paul Humphries	White	33	M	December 2, 2005	Greenville	Lethal injection	Dickie Smith	Mark Sanford
36	William Ernest Downs Jr.	White	39	M	July 14, 2006	Aiken	Lethal injection	Keenan Andre O'Mailia (Note: Also killed James Mitchell Porter in Georgia, but was executed for killing O'Mailia.)	Mark Sanford
37	Calvin Alphonso Shuler	Black	40	M	June 22, 2007	Dorchester	Lethal injection	James Brooks	Mark Sanford
38	David Mark Hill	White	48	M	June 6, 2008	Aiken	Lethal injection	James Riddle, Josie Curry, and Michael Gregory	Mark Sanford
39	James Earl Reed	Black	49	M	June 20, 2008	Charleston	Electrocution	Joseph Lafayette and Barbara Ann Lafayette	Mark Sanford
40	Joseph Martin Luther Gardner	Black	38	M	December 5, 2008	Dorchester	Lethal injection	Melissa McLauchlin	Mark Sanford
41	Luke A. Williams	White	56	M	February 20, 2009	Edgefield	Lethal injection	Linda Williams and Shaun Williams	Mark Sanford
42	Thomas Treshawn Ivey	Black	34	M	May 8, 2009	Orangeburg	Lethal injection	Robert Montgomery and Orangeburg Police Sergeant Thomas Harrison	Mark Sanford
43	Jeffrey Brian Motts	White	36	M	May 6, 2011	Greenville	Lethal injection	Charles Douglas Martin (Note: Also killed Clyde Lloyd Camby and Etta Louise Osteen, but was executed for killing Martin.)	Nikki Haley
44	Freddie Eugene Owens	Black	46	M	September 20, 2024	Greenville	Lethal injection	Irene Grainger Graves (Note: Also killed Christopher Bryan Lee, but was executed for killing Graves.)	Henry McMaster
45	Richard Bernard Moore	Black	59	M	November 1, 2024	Spartanburg	Lethal injection	James Mahoney	Henry McMaster
46	Marion Bowman Jr.	Black	44	M	January 31, 2025	Dorchester	Lethal injection	Kandee Louise Martin	Henry McMaster
47	Brad Keith Sigmon	White	67	M	March 7, 2025	Greenville	Firing squad	William David Larke and Gladys Gwendolyn Larke	Henry McMaster
48	Mikal Deen Mahdi	Black	42	M	April 11, 2025	Calhoun	Firing squad	Orangeburg Police Captain James Edward Myers (Note: Also killed Greg Jones in Virginia and Christopher Jason Boggs in North Carolina, but was executed for killing Myers.)	Henry McMaster
49	Stephen Christopher Stanko	White	57	M	June 13, 2025	Georgetown and Horry	Lethal injection	Laura Elizabeth Ling and Henry Lee Turner	Henry McMaster
50	Stephen Corey Bryant	White	44	M	November 14, 2025	Sumter	Firing squad	Willard Irving Tietjen Jr. (Note: Also killed Clifton Gainey and Christopher Burgess, but was executed for killing Tietjen.)	Henry McMaster

== Demographics ==
Race
White	29	58%
Black	20	40%
Native American	1	2%
Age
20–29	2	4%
30–39	18	36%
40–49	20	40%
50–59	9	18%
60–69	1	2%
Sex
Male	50	100%
Date of execution
1976–1979	0	0%
1980–1989	2	4%
1990–1999	22	44%
2000–2009	18	36%
2010–2019	1	2%
2020–2029	7	14%
Method
Lethal injection	40	80%
Electrocution	7	14%
Firing squad	3	6%
Governor (Party)
James B. Edwards (R)	0	0%
Richard Riley (D)	2	4%
Carroll A. Campbell Jr. (R)	2	4%
David Beasley (R)	17	34%
Jim Hodges (D)	7	14%
Mark Sanford (R)	14	28%
Nikki Haley (R)	1	2%
Henry McMaster (R)	7	14%
Total	50	100%

== See also ==
- Capital punishment in South Carolina
- Capital punishment in the United States
- George Stinney, executed in South Carolina in 1944 at the age of 14
- List of people executed in South Carolina (pre-1972) – executions before Furman
