= Oakland school shooting =

Oakland school shooting may refer to:

- Oakland Elementary School shooting (1988), in Greenwood, South Carolina
- Oikos University shooting (2012), in Oakland, California
- Rusdale High School shooting (2022), in Oakland, California
