= Robert James Anderson =

Robert James Anderson can refer to:

- Bob Anderson (fencer) (1922–2012), born Robert James Gilbert Anderson, English Olympic fencer
- Bobby Anderson (actor) (1933–2006), American actor
- Robert Anderson (murderer) (1966–2006), American murderer
