= Murder of Bruce Smalls =

1985 murder of a police officer in South Carolina

Bruce Smalls
- Born: Bruce Kenneth Smalls; October 7, 1954; Jasper County, South Carolina, U.S.
- Died: September 27, 1985 (aged 30); Jasper County, South Carolina, U.S.
- Cause of death: Murder by shooting
- Resting place: Beaufort National Cemetery
- Occupation: South Carolina Highway Patrol (Trooper First Class)

On September 27, 1985, in Jasper County, South Carolina, 30-year-old Bruce Kenneth Smalls (October 7, 1954 – September 27, 1985), a state police trooper, was shot and murdered in the line of duty by Richard Charles Johnson (February 18, 1963 – May 3, 2002), who was also involved in the murder of a Virginia businessman. Johnson and two other people were charged with the murder, but only Johnson was convicted of Smalls's murder. As a result, he was sentenced to death in 1986 in addition to a life sentence for the second murder he committed. After losing his appeals against the death sentence, Johnson was executed at age 39 on May 3, 2002.

== Murder ==
On September 27, 1985, in Jasper County, South Carolina, Trooper First Class Bruce Kenneth Smalls of the South Carolina Highway Patrol was murdered in the line of duty by 22-year-old Richard Charles Johnson, who committed another murder before the crime.

Prior to the murder of Smalls, Johnson, who was hitchhiking, entered the vehicle of 52-year-old Daniel "Dan" Swanson, a Virginia businessman who was travelling from North Carolina to Florida. Swanson would later pick up two more hitchhikers, 17-year-old Connie Sue Hess and 20-year-old Curtis Harbert, and they drove to South Carolina. While stopping at Clarendon County, South Carolina, Johnson brandished a .357 caliber revolver and shot Swanson in the head, killing him while he was asleep. To conceal the murder, Johnson and Harbert wrapped Swanson's body in blankets and sheets, secured it with wire, and hid the corpse in the vehicle beneath a mattress.

Johnson and the other two hitchhikers took Swanson's car and by the time the trio reached Jasper County, South Carolina, Johnson, who had consumed alcohol, began to show signs of erratic behavior. His reckless driving caught the attention of a truck driver who alerted Smalls. Smalls stopped the vehicle at Interstate 95, questioning Johnson. During the interrogation, Johnson shot Smalls six times, killing him instantly. Smalls was then 30 years old and married with two sons at the time of his death.

After murdering Smalls, Johnson dragged the body down a steep embankment near Swanson's car. Johnson and the two hitchhikers then went their separate ways; Johnson on foot towards the north, and the two other hitchhikers—Hess and Harbert—ran south, later turning themselves in to the authorities. Johnson was arrested a short time later by the police. Johnson had the murder weapon and stolen items of Swanson in his possession when he was apprehended. The body of Smalls was found by several passers-by, which led to the police discovering Swanson's body a short time later.

On October 3, 1985, a week after the murder of Smalls, over 250 police officers from South Carolina, Illinois and several other states in the U.S. gathered at a local church in South Carolina to attend his funeral. Smalls first joined the South Carolina Highway Patrol in 1976 as a telecommunications officer, later appointed as a trooper in 1978, and a promotion to Trooper First Class in 1980.

== Trial of Richard Charles Johnson ==
Richard Johnson
- Richard Charles Johnson was ledding to the courthouse.
- Born: Richard Charles Johnson; February 18, 1963; North Carolina, U.S.
- Died: May 3, 2002 (aged 39); Broad River Correctional Institution, South Carolina, U.S.
- Cause of death: Execution by lethal injection
- Status: Executed
- Convictions: Murder (x2); Armed robbery
- Penalty: Death (murder; Smalls); Life imprisonment (murder; Swanson); 25 years' imprisonment (robbery)

Details
- Victims: Bruce Kenneth Smalls, 30; Daniel Swanson, 52
- Date: September 27, 1985
- Country: United States
- State: South Carolina
- Imprisoned at: Broad River Correctional Institution

On September 28, 1985, the day after the murders of Bruce Smalls and Dan Swanson, the South Carolina state authorities charged Richard Johnson, Connie Hess and Curtis Harbert with the murder of Smalls. The police and prosecution did not immediately charge the trio with the murder of Swanson, as they could not confirm whether Swanson was killed in South Carolina. The prosecution confirmed in February 1986 that they would seek the death penalty against Johnson.

By February 1986, Johnson was the only person left facing a murder charge for the fatal shooting of Smalls. The other two hitchhikers, Hess and Harbert, had their charges dropped and they turned state evidence against Johnson, and both testified that they had seen Johnson killing Smalls by shooting.

On February 14, 1986, a Jasper County jury found Johnson guilty of the murder of Smalls. Two days later, on February 16, 1986, the same jury imposed the death penalty for Johnson.

On March 10, 1986, a month after he was convicted and sentenced for murdering Smalls, Johnson pleaded guilty to the second charge of murder for the killing of Swanson, in addition to one count of armed robbery. Johnson was sentenced to life imprisonment plus 25 years for both charges.

== Johnson's re-trial and appeals ==
On August 24, 1987, the South Carolina Supreme Court ordered a re-trial for Johnson on appeal. The conviction and death sentence for the murder of Bruce Smalls was vacated as a result.

In March 1988, a different jury once again convicted Johnson of the murder of Smalls, and sentenced Johnson to death a second time.

On October 7, 1991, the South Carolina Supreme Court dismissed Johnson's second appeal against his death sentence.

On September 24, 1998, Johnson's federal appeal was turned down by the 4th Circuit Court of Appeals.

On September 21, 1999, the 4th Circuit Court of Appeals rejected another appeal from Johnson.

== Stay of executions and final appeal ==
After he exhausted all his avenues of appeal against the death sentence, Johnson was scheduled to be executed on August 23, 1996. The U.S. Supreme Court dismissed Johnson's petition for a stay, but the execution date was delay due to legal reasons. Three years after his execution was stayed, Johnson's second death warrant was issued and his execution was re-scheduled to happen on October 29, 1999.

On October 22, 1999, a week before the impending execution, the key witness of Johnson's trial, Connie Hess, who was then hospitalized at a mental asylum in Nebraska, recanted her testimony and claimed she herself was the real killer of Smalls, while claiming that it was the other hitchhiker, Curtis Harbert, who killed Swanson. She stated that she feared getting executed and hence it prompted her to pin the blame on Johnson, but she claimed she chose to tell the truth to ease her conscience.

Due to the emergence of Hess's new testimony, there were calls for both clemency and a new trial for Johnson. The state's Roman Catholic bishop Robert Baker and Smalls's mother both asked for the state to reassess the validity of Johnson's guilt due to Hess's confession. Smalls's 20-year-old elder son, then a college student, stated that he had no sympathy for the murderer of his father; Smalls's widow had died in 1999.

On October 28, 1999, the eve of his scheduled execution, Johnson was granted a stay of execution by the South Carolina Supreme Court, to conduct a new hearing to assess the new claims of his innocence.

On May 31, 2000, Circuit Judge William Keesley, who was appointed to hear the case, dismissed the appeal of Johnson. Keesley stated that the Hess's confession could not be used to grant a re-trial for Johnson, given that Hess had repeatedly changed her stories and all her statements contained multiple inconsistencies, which affected her credibility even if she may have been competent enough to testify in court. Keesley also added that Hess had a very long history of mental health problems, including borderline personality disorder, and it would have had an effect on her reliability as a witness. For this, Keesley concluded that Hess's new testimony would not change the outcome of Johnson's trial in relation to his guilt.

On June 11, 2001, by a decision of 3–2, the South Carolina Supreme Court affirmed Keesley's decision to dismiss Johnson's appeal for a new trial, after finding that the severe inconsistencies in Hess's multiple statements about the crime would not provide sufficient grounds to grant Johnson a new trial.

== Johnson's 2002 death warrant and execution ==
On April 9, 2002, the South Carolina Supreme Court signed a third death warrant for Richard Johnson, directing that his death sentence be carried out on May 3, 2002. The final recourse for Johnson was to either appeal to the Governor for clemency or to appeal to the U.S. Supreme Court for a stay. Many opponents of capital punishment, as well as Smalls's mother Thelma Blue asked the governor to grant clemency for Johnson.

The National Association for the Advancement of Colored People (NAACP), state religious leaders (including Reverend Jesse Jackson) and some legal professionals – including former state prosecutors and a former chief justice of the South Carolina Supreme Court – banded together to petition for clemency. The petitioners asked for Johnson to be granted clemency and have his death sentence commuted to life in prison, since there were some doubts over whether he was truly guilty and some believed that the death penalty did not deter serious crimes and was disproportionately applied to people of color and those from disadvantaged backgrounds. Johnson was White, while Smalls was African-American.

Before the execution date, governor Hodges chose not to commute Johnson's death sentence and ordered that his execution may proceed as originally scheduled. Hodges stated that before he made the decision, he had spoken to the sister and son of Smalls, who both wanted the execution to be carried out, and Hodges himself reviewed the case and concluded that Johnson was truly guilty and hence should be executed. Apart from this, Johnson's last-minute appeal to the U.S. Supreme Court for a stay of execution was ultimately rejected.

On May 3, 2002, 39 year old Johnson was put to death by lethal injection at the Broad River Correctional Institution; he reportedly expressed his gratitude to the supporters who advocated against his execution and asked to continue the fight against capital punishment in his final statement. Johnson reportedly ate a last meal of fried shrimp, fried oysters, french fries, chocolate cake and iced tea prior to his execution. Johnson was the 26th person to be executed in South Carolina since the state's resumption of capital punishment in 1985.

== Aftermath ==
In the aftermath of Richard Johnson's execution, there were concerns that the execution itself was likely politically motivated, given that Jim Hodges, then Governor of South Carolina, faced fierce competition in his governorship re-election campaign from the Republicans who supported capital punishment. On top of that, since Johnson, who was White, was convicted of murdering Bruce Smalls, who was an African-American police officer, it would have been highly impossible for Hodges to grant clemency to a condemned White man for killing an African-American victim. Apart from this, the questionable circumstances revolving around the trial of Johnson – mainly the shifting testimonies of key witness Connie Hess and absence of physical evidence to link Johnson to Smalls's murder – also caused some to question whether or not Johnson should be executed.

Johnson was one of the few White criminals on death row to be executed for murdering African-Americans since 1976. It was extremely rare for White people to be sentenced to death for killing African-Americans in the United States; a 2014 study revealed that Johnson was one of only 16 White defendants to be executed for the murder of African-Americans, while about 230 African-Americans were executed for killing White people, highlighting the issue of racial disparity in capital punishment in the United States.

Nearly three decades after the murder of Smalls, his younger son, Kevin, who was two when his father was murdered, became a police officer like his father and joined the Colleton County Sheriff's Office in March 2013. Kevin, who had few memories of his father, stated that based on stories given by his other family members and family friends, Smalls had a deep involvement in his church and his community, aside from his past as a Vietnam War veteran and nine-year police career, and possessed a good and caring character. He also expressed his comfort that his father was still remembered even after his death, including the decision to name a local interstate (the same location where Smalls was killed) after his father in 2009. A 2022 news report revealed that Kevin had been promoted to a police lieutenant and he continued to remember his father and legacy.

Columbia-based defense attorney Diana Holt recalled the case of Johnson in 2015, when she recounted how she approached Hess, who had claimed to be the real killer of Smalls. Holt, who also recounted the case of former death row inmate Edward Lee Elmore, who was acquitted after 28 years of legal battle against his conviction and death sentence, stated that the process of post-conviction relief was not easy, as she had to repeatedly investigate concluded capital cases and appeal proceedings to determine whether a convicted person was truly innocent or guilty.

== See also ==
- Capital punishment in South Carolina
- List of people executed in South Carolina
- List of people executed in the United States in 2002
- List of white defendants executed for killing a black victim
