= Tyree Roberts =

American convicted cop killer (born 1962)

Tyree Alphonso Roberts
- 2023 mugshot of Roberts
- Born: July 24, 1962 (age 64); South Carolina, U.S.
- Status: Incarcerated on death row
- Conviction: Murder (x2)
- Penalty: Death (October 22, 2003)

Details
- Victims: 2
- Date: January 8, 2002
- Location: Beaufort County, South Carolina
- Imprisoned at: Broad River Correctional Institution

Tyree Alphonso Roberts (born July 24, 1962), alias Abdiyyah ben Alkebulanyahh, is an American convicted murderer. On January 8, 2002, in Beaufort County, South Carolina, Roberts used an assault rifle to shoot and murder two police officers, Corporal Dyke "A.J." Coursen and Lance Corporal Dana Lyle Tate, who both came to Roberts's house in response to a police report on domestic abuse lodged by Roberts's partner. Roberts was arrested for both killings, and he was convicted and sentenced to death for the double murder. Roberts is currently on death row awaiting execution at the Broad River Correctional Institution.

== Murders ==
On January 8, 2002, while living in a trailer in Beaufort County, South Carolina, 39-year-old Tyree Alphonso Roberts, alias Abdiyyah ben Alkebulanyahh, got involved in a domestic dispute with his partner Kimberly Blake, with whom Roberts had an infant daughter. Blake purportedly asked her friend to call the police for assistance to leave Roberts's home, stating that Roberts had hit her.

Two sheriff deputies, 35-year-old Corporal Dyke "A.J." Coursen and 44-year-old Lance Corporal Dana Lyle Tate, later arrived at the trailer in response to the report. Corporal Coursen and Lance Corporal Tate entered the house and the trailer's owner Brenda Smith allowed the pair to search the bedroom. Roberts, armed with an assault rifle, hid in the bedroom closet just as the police arrived at the trailer, and as Lance Corporal Tate and Corporal Coursen both entered the room, Roberts began to fire multiple shots at both police officers before he fled the trailer. Both the policemen died as a result of the shooting; Lance Corporal Tate suffered from seven gunshot wounds while Corporal Coursen sustained six gunshot wounds in total.

After Roberts fled his residence, he headed to the nearby forest with his gun in his hands, joining Blake, who had earlier ran out of the trailer after hearing the gunshots. Blake later separated from Roberts and returned to the trailer. By then, police reinforcements had arrived and found the bodies of both Lance Corporal Tate and Corporal Coursen inside the trailer bedroom, and Blake was among those questioned by the police. Subsequently, the police conducted a search around the area, and in the end, Roberts was found hiding in the mud under a bridge with a shoulder and hip wound. Roberts was therefore arrested for the double murder, and his wife was also arrested as an accessory to murder.

The following week after the murders, on January 14, 2002, the funeral for both fallen officers was conducted, and more than a thousand police officers, as well as friends and families attended the funeral. At the time of their deaths, Lance Corporal Tate worked as a police officer for about four years and left behind a wife and four children, while Corporal Coursen had served in the force for nearly a year and left behind his wife and a two-year-old son. The double murder was the first in almost 30 years when multiple killings of South Carolina law enforcement officers took place. Additionally, Corporal Coursen and Lance Corporal Tate were among the four police officers murdered in the line of duty within the previous month from December 2001 and January 2002.

== Trial ==
On January 8, 2002, Tyree Roberts was charged with two counts of murder for the fatal shootings of Corporal Dyke Coursen and Lance Corporal Dana Lyle Tate. Prior to his arrest for the murders, Roberts had an extensive criminal record: he was first caught and convicted for marijuana distribution in March 1997, and received a five-year jail term, suspended to 24 months in prison and two years of probation. He was re-arrested twice for marijuana possession and assault and battery in November 2000, although the drug charge remained pending and the remaining charges dismissed for non-conviction at the time of his arrest for murder. Roberts himself was also previously jailed for armed robbery, carjacking and drug offences in South Carolina, Georgia and Florida.

The trial of Roberts was conducted in October 2003, and unusually, Roberts was allowed to represent himself without a lawyer in his defence. Throughout the trial, Roberts continued to maintain he was innocent and that he never fired a shot at the victims. He also went as far as to accuse the police of planting evidence to frame him. Roberts also accused a trial witness as the real killer of the case.

On October 20, 2003, Roberts was found guilty of both counts of murder by the jury.

During closing submissions on sentence, the prosecution, led by Randolph Murdaugh III, sought the death penalty for Roberts, stating that he already had "life in prison" and his actions of killing police officers showed he was at war with civilization and would always be at war, and hence they implored the jury to decide on the death penalty, stating that their verdict "(spoke) the truth" and "only one way to end this war". The defence asked for life imprisonment.

On October 22, 2003, Roberts was sentenced to death by Circuit Judge Daniel Pieper after all the 12 jurors unanimously agreed to impose the death penalty. Additionally, the judge also set an execution date of December 22, 2003, for Roberts, although the execution would be stayed pending a mandatory review by the South Carolina Supreme Court. It was also reported that Roberts's wife might also stand trial for helping her husband to escape.

== Death row ==
After he was condemned to death row, Tyree Roberts was first transferred to death row at the Broad River Correctional Institution on October 23, 2003. As of April 2022, Roberts was one of 35 inmates awaiting execution in the state. The number later decreased to 32 in September 2023, after serial killer Quincy Allen and convicted cop killer James Nathaniel Bryant and an unknown third inmate were removed from death row.

As of September 2024, when Freddie Eugene Owens was scheduled to be the first inmate executed in South Carolina after a 13-year moratorium, Roberts was one of 32 inmates (also including Owens) on death row in South Carolina. Roberts was also one of at least five death row prisoners convicted of murdering law enforcement officers.

=== Appeals ===
On June 3, 2005, while his appeal was still pending before the South Carolina Supreme Court, Tyree Roberts attempted to proceed with the appeal without any defence counsel, and requested the South Carolina Supreme Court to approve his decision. However, the court denied the motion.

On July 24, 2006, the South Carolina Supreme Court rejected Roberts's direct appeal against his death sentence and upheld his death sentence and murder conviction.

On January 18, 2007, Roberts's first federal appeal to the 4th Circuit Court of Appeals was dismissed.

On July 13, 2009, the U.S. District Court for the District of South Carolina denied Roberts's appeal.

On December 29, 2009, Roberts lost his second appeal to the 4th Circuit Court of Appeals.

On July 13, 2011, the U.S. District Court for the District of South Carolina turned down Roberts's second appeal.

On November 18, 2011, Roberts's third appeal to the 4th Circuit Court of Appeals was denied.

== Aftermath ==
A year after the murder, the friends and family members of both Corporal Coursen and Lance Corporal Tate attended a memorial, where both late officers were honoured along with another 100 law enforcement officers who died in South Carolina last year, including six more who were killed in the line of duty the same year as both Corporal Coursen and Lance Corporal Tate.

In 2012, ten years after the murders, a charity fundraiser was held to memorialize both the victims. The event was also planned by Lance Corporal Tate's widow, although Corporal Coursen's widow was absent from the event, finding that it was not suited to the tragedy but nevertheless felt grateful for the community's support.

In October 2025, when the Horry County solicitor announced he would seek the death penalty against Brandon Council for state murder charges in the 2017 Conway bank murders, 14th Circuit Solicitor Duffie Stone, who was a deputy solicitor in charge of Roberts's murder trial back in 2003, stated that the decision to pursue capital punishment was not a decision taken lightly, and in recounting the murders of Lance Corporal Tate and Corporal Coursen, Stone stated that Roberts never gave the two officers a chance when he ambushed and shot both of them with his rifle. Council was originally on federal death row for the double murder before his federal death sentence was commuted to life without parole by Attorney General Merrick Garland on December 23, 2024, in the Garland-Oyer Commutation Memoranda, and the state prosecution expressed their intent to revive state charges against him.

== See also ==
- Capital punishment in South Carolina
- List of death row inmates in the United States § South Carolina
