= Shawn Paul Humphries =

American murderer (1971–2005)

Shawn Paul Humphries

Shawn Paul Humphries (October 19, 1971 – December 2, 2005) was a murderer executed by the U.S. state of South Carolina. He was convicted of the January 1, 1994, murder of Dickie Smith in Fountain Inn, South Carolina. Humphries was pronounced dead at 6:18 p.m. EST on December 2, 2005, by lethal injection at the Broad River Correctional Institution in Columbia.

== Youth ==
His father was extremely abusive towards Humphries and introduced him to alcohol, drugs, and paint fumes when he was between the ages of six and ten. Humphries' aunt said that his father had said on several occasions that he did not love his children and wished that they had been aborted. Humphries had only been conceived after his mother had been raped at knife-point by her estranged husband.

He lived with his brother and grandparents from the time he was three until the age of twelve. His grandfather testified that both he and his wife were heavy drinkers and that she grew marijuana in their backyard. Only when their mother remarried did the boys return to live with her.

Prior to the murders he had a criminal record. Humphries was arrested in 1984 for two counts of breaking and entering and was placed on probation. He received more probation after being suspended from school for fighting on several occasions. At fifteen he was sent to a state facility in Columbia for thirty days. In January 1989 he was arrested after breaking into a church while looking for food, as he was homeless at the time. His first jail term was in Alabama from stealing a car. He received two years in prison followed by four years of probation.

== Attempted robbery and murder ==
Humphries and his friend Eddie Blackwell had been driving around drinking beer on the night of January 1, 1994, and decided to rob the Max-Saver convenience store. When they entered the shop around 7 a.m., Dickie Smith asked the two men if they would like something hot. Humphries reportedly flashed his stolen gun at the owner, and demanded money. Smith then reached under the counter and Humphries fired one shot that hit Smith in the head. Fleeing the scene, Humphries left Blackwell in the shop, where he was arrested by police. Humphries was apprehended a short time later. Humphries said he panicked when he saw Smith reach behind the counter and was not a cold-blooded killer. This became a controversial part of the case, as Humphries's advocates said his sentence was too harsh.

== Trial and appeals ==
He was convicted on August 5, 1994, of murder, attempted robbery, possession of a firearm during the commission of a violent crime, and criminal conspiracy. For the murder he received a death sentence, and concurrent sentences of twenty years for the robbery and five years for criminal conspiracy. For his part in the crime, Edward Blackwell received life imprisonment.

His conviction and sentence were affirmed by the South Carolina Supreme Court. After this he filed various petition for a writ of certiorari and habeas corpus including the U.S. District Court for the District of South Carolina. All were denied.

His appeals lawyers say that the trial had serious problems. During his closing statement, the prosecutor compared the lives of Smith and Humphries during a year, suggesting, in the words of Judge Wilkinson of the United States Court of Appeals for the Fourth Circuit, that "his life is of less worth than that of someone else." The prosecutor stated that it was "profane to give this man a gift of life under these circumstances." Wilkinson wrote in his dissenting opinion that the fact that Humphries's lawyer did not object to these statements is the hallmark of ineffective counsel.

== Execution ==
Humphries was executed on December 2, 2005, by lethal injection, in the 1001st execution since the Gregg v. Georgia decision in 1976.

His final statement was read before the execution by his lawyer. The one-and-a-half-page handwritten statement said in part:

"I hope that my execution brings the Smith family some peace. But now I want to say something to everyone who supports this or any execution. We are all sinners, so what gives you the right as a sinner to take away a gift that God gave?"

He also mouthed the words "I'm sorry" while looking at Kathy Carpenter, one of Smith's sisters. When the woman nodded, a tear appeared to roll down his cheek. After the execution, Kathy Carpenter described those words as the "greatest gift that I could have ever received" and said she gave forgave Humphries.

His last meal consisted of a McDonald's hamburger, french fries, broccoli and cheese, and oat cereal.

== See also ==
- Capital punishment in South Carolina
- Capital punishment in the United States
- List of people executed in South Carolina
- List of people executed in the United States in 2005

== General references ==
- Report from the National Coalition to Abolish the Death Penalty
- Humphries v. Zmint (PDF) No. 03-14 decision from United States Court of Appeals for the Fourth Circuit
- "Man who killed Upstate store clerk apologizes before his execution". Associated Press. December 2, 2005.
- "Slaying changed family forever". The Greenville News. December 2, 2005.

Executions carried out in South Carolina
Preceded by Hastings Arthur Wise November 4, 2005	Shawn Paul Humphries; December 2, 2005	Succeeded by William Downs Jr. July 14, 2006
Executions carried out in the United States
Preceded by Kenneth Boyd – North Carolina December 2, 2005	Shawn Paul Humphries – South Carolina; December 2, 2005	Succeeded by Wesley Baker – Maryland December 5, 2005
