= Samuel Green (criminal) =

American serial killer

- Born: Samuel Green; 1796; Meredith, New Hampshire, U.S.
- Died: April 25, 1822 (aged 26); Boston, Massachusetts, U.S.
- Cause of death: Execution by hanging
- Other name: Terror of New England
- Convictions: Murder; Burglary
- Penalty: Death

Details
- Victims: Numerous
- Span of crimes: 1817–1821
- Country: United States and Canada
- States: New Hampshire, Quebec, Vermont, New York, Maine, Massachusetts

Samuel Green (1796 – April 25, 1822) was an American serial killer and robber. He was one of the first to be called "public enemy", in the United States, as a dangerous criminal at-large. The hanging of Green is the only confirmed instance of a white person being executed for the murder of a black victim in Massachusetts.

== Early life ==
Green was born in Meredith, New Hampshire in 1796. At an early age, his parents believed him to be possessed by a demon because of a frequent habit of skipping school; this resulted in whippings. As a teenager, he became a blacksmith's apprentice and was whipped for stealing. He was whipped for destroying the blacksmith's garden but did not admit it. He was then sent home and whipped again. In retaliation, Green threw the family dog down a well, contaminating the water, and caused great expense to the family. He was beaten severely for this. He retaliated by slashing the neck of the family pig and was again whipped.

The family gave up and sent Samuel to live with family friend Albert Dunne in New Hampton, New Hampshire. Green attended school for a while but began skipping again. He then stole a Jew's harp from a shop and Dunne beat him as punishment. Green fled home and his parents, having heard of the theft, beat him unconscious. Green was sent to Dunne and then whipped until the flesh was flayed off his back.

In retaliation for the last beating, Green set up a trap to kill Dunne. In the barn door, Green rigged an axe to fall on Dunne's head, and a pitchfork that would strike Dunne. When Dunne entered the barn, the axe sliced his coat and the pitchfork gave him a slight foot injury. Dunne then tied Green against a barn door, severely whipping and bloodying him for the attempted murder. Afterwards, Green destroyed a hogshead of cider, stole bushels of corn, and tried to burn down Dunne's barn. As usual, he was whipped and beat by Dunne.

After a few months, Green became too strong for Dunne, who let him be. Later, Green met another youth named William Ash.

== Criminal career ==
Green and Ash went to New Hampton where they met a traveling salesman named Franklin Loomis. He became their mentor, teaching them how to forge bank notes and burglarize homes of the rich, businesses, and banks. One day they came by a schoolhouse and Green hurled a large piece of timber underneath a sleigh full of children, putting them in danger. The schoolmaster caught the two and severely beat them. Later that night, they lay in wait for the schoolmaster to come and knocked him unconscious with rocks, stripped him, tied him up and hoped he would freeze. However, he was found and survived.

Green and Ash traveled through Guilford and Burlington, Vermont, where Green joined the army. He deserted, but was captured and flogged. Later, Green escaped to New Hampshire and reunited with his family. He had become wealthy by this time because of his counterfeiting. Green bought his mother a cow and spent the rest of his money on fancy clothes, a horse, jewelry, and meals.

Green ran out of money and left for Boston, where he became a servant for wealthy men. During the day, he was a loyal servant but at night Green robbed the homes of valuables and fled. Around this time, Green went back to Loomis, who had taught him how to pick locks more efficiently and make duplicate keys. Green and Ash had robbed hundreds of homes and offices. In Bath, New Hampshire, the two met a jewelry salesman who let them inspect his goods. They ambushed him when he rode past. He was knocked from a mule and clubbed to death to eliminate a witness.

Green then went around New England, killing and robbing. He was imprisoned on suspicion several times but released as there was insufficient evidence. Ash also helped him escape jail numerous times. After robbing a store of jewels in Montreal he was pursued by a posse, shooting and killing several of the men. He was later captured and sentenced to hang in a short trial. Ash helped him escape and Green hid in the mountains in New Hampshire.

Green then began burglarizing homes and stores in New York City and Albany. Later, he killed a wealthy French traveler in Middlebury, Vermont. Green would go on to rape, steal horses, burglarize, counterfeit and murder from Montpelier, Vermont, to Schenectady, New York; and from Saco, Maine, to Barre, Vermont. He became "public enemy number one". High bounties were placed on him.

== Final capture and aftermath ==
Green was arrested for robbing a store in Danvers, Massachusetts while drunk. He was convicted of burglary, sentenced to four years in prison and sent to prison in Boston. Green tried to escape several times and had to wear special shackles and clogs to slow him. He had more years added to his sentence.

Green later found out that another prisoner, Billy Williams, had told officials of and thwarted his previous escape. Once Green was out of solitary confinement, he poisoned Williams' food; however, Williams did not eat it. On November 8, 1821, Green attacked Williams and fractured his skull with an iron rod. While Williams was still unconscious, Green continuously struck him with the iron rod, breaking Williams' ribs, arms, and legs. Green then attempted to attack another prisoner, but was stopped by prison guards. Williams succumbed to his injuries the next week.

Green was convicted of murder and given an execution date of April 25, 1822, despite his attempts at declaring mistrial on the grounds of one of the witnesses being incompetent to testify. At the gallows, Green informed the priest he had nothing to say to the many spectators in attendance. "They shall not know my fate," he said. "I have written out my confession in full." The priest replied "Are you penitent, my son?" With the rope placed, Green gave the priest a long stare and a thin smile curled upward as he replied "If you wish it."

== See also ==
- List of white defendants executed for killing a black victim
- List of serial killers in the United States
