= Hastings Arthur Wise =

American mass murderer

- Born: February 16, 1954; North Augusta, South Carolina, U.S.
- Died: November 4, 2005 (aged 51); Broad River Correctional Institution, South Carolina, U.S.
- Occupation: R.E. Phelon employee
- Status: Executed by lethal injection
- Motive: Revenge
- Convictions: Murder (4 counts); Assault and battery with intent to kill (3 counts); Second degree burglary Possession of a weapon during the commission of a violent crime (4 counts)
- Penalty: Death

Details
- Date: September 15, 1997
- Country: United States
- Location: Aiken, South Carolina
- Target: Former co-workers
- Killed: 4
- Injured: 3
- Weapon: Pistol

Hastings Arthur Wise (February 16, 1954 – November 4, 2005) was a convicted American mass murderer who was executed in the U.S. state of South Carolina for killing four former co-workers. Sometimes erroneously referred to by the press as "Arthur Hastings Wise," he was known simply as Hastings Wise to the people he worked with.

Wise shot and killed Charles Griffeth, David Moore, Leonard Filyaw, and Sheryl Wood on September 15, 1997, at the lawn mower parts manufacturing factory of his former employer, R.E. Phelon Company, in Aiken, South Carolina.

== Crime ==
Hastings Wise was an ex-convict who had served prison time for bank robbery and receipt of stolen goods before obtaining a technical degree and, eventually, finding employment at R.E. Phelon. He had no criminal convictions for the approximately fifteen years between his release from prison and the murders of 1997. According to his pastor, in eleven years, he had "hardly ever" missed a week of Sunday services.

The motive for the murders was Wise's termination of employment with the factory following a confrontation with a supervisor eleven weeks earlier. Wise had worked there as a machine operator for more than four years until his firing in July 1997. After his dismissal, Wise told co-workers he would "be back."

Testimony was presented at trial that he had felt discriminated against for being African American throughout his life and that the jobs he wanted were given to white employees by a white personnel director. Wise killed the director, and three other white workers as well.

On September 15, the day of the murders, Hastings Wise drove into the Phelon employee parking lot for a scheduled meeting to pick up a box of personal items from Stanley Vance, a security guard. Instead, he shot Vance in the chest with a semi-automatic pistol. Wise tore out the guard station's phone lines and told Vance, "I got things to do." Vance survived his injuries.

Wise then entered the main building, first going to the personnel office, where he fatally shot Charles Griffeth, the man who had fired him, twice in the back. Griffeth was 56 years old.

The next victims were in the tool and die area. He fired rapidly, killing David Wayne Moore, 30, and Ernest Leonard Filyaw, 31. Two other people were injured in this area. According to news reports, Moore and Filyaw were both engaged to be married at the time of their murders. According to court documents, Wise had wanted a promotion to the tool and die area where Moore and Filyaw worked, but had not gotten it.

The last victim was Esther Sheryl Wood, 27, who held a quality control position. He first shot her in the back and leg and then, in what Aiken County prosecutor Barbara Morgan described as "execution-style," shot her in the head. Contemporary news reports stated he had been denied a promotion to Wood's job.

Wise reloaded several times as he walked through the plant, shooting and screaming something incomprehensible to the witnesses who later testified at trial. Police recovered four empty magazines, each with a capacity of 8 bullets. There were also four full magazines and 123 more bullets.

After Wise reached the upper floor of the plant, he lay down and swallowed insecticide in a suicide attempt. He was semi-conscious when police located him.

== Trial and appeals ==
Wise was indicted in August 1998. His trial was delayed when the judge assigned to it was changed in 2000, and underwent a further delay when one of his defense attorneys was arrested in North Augusta, South Carolina on domestic violence charges. Although the crimes were committed in Aiken County, the trial itself was held in Beaufort County, South Carolina by order of the trial judge, who felt that the publicity around the crime may have tainted the Aiken County jury pool.

A psychiatrist who assessed Wise said that he drove over 9,000 miles in the two weeks before the murders, in a desire to visit and see sights such as the San Diego Zoo before carrying out the crimes he planned to commit. The psychiatrist said that the only motive behind the murders was the dismissal from his job, and that Wise felt he had been mistreated all his life due to being African American.

After a two-week trial in which the defense called no witnesses, Wise was convicted of the four murders after five hours of deliberation by the jury.

During the sentencing phase of the trial, at Wise's insistence, no character witnesses were called by the defense, although his attorneys had a slate of thirteen people willing to testify. Wise reportedly said:

I don't have much to say except that I did not wish to take advantage of the court as far as asking [for] mercy. It's a fair trial. I committed the crimes.

He was given the death penalty for all four murders. Wise was also sentenced to 60 years for the non-fatal shootings Stan Vance, Jerry Corley and John Mucha, all of whom survived. Shorter concurrent sentences were given for burglary and possession of a gun during the commission of a violent crime.

After conviction, on February 2, 2001, Wise was transferred to the custody of the South Carolina Department of Corrections, where he was known as Inmate #00005074.

After an automatic appeal to the South Carolina Supreme Court, the conviction and sentence were upheld. Wise's court-appointed attorneys then appealed to the United States Supreme Court, which declined to hear the appeal.

At that point, Wise wrote to the state Supreme Court to say that the second appeal was made against his wishes and that he wanted to die. Wise thus waived the right to further appeals of his death sentence. He was the sixth person to do so since South Carolina reintroduced capital punishment after the U.S. Supreme Court decision in Gregg v. Georgia.

By refusing to pursue all his permitted appeals, Wise became what is known in legal and correctional circles as a "volunteer" for execution. This is consistent with his careful planning and the suicide attempt at the plant, which suggest that he may have been planning "suicide by cop" as well. Whether by the insecticide he ingested, or by police action, or by formal execution, Hastings Wise clearly did not intend to survive his revenge spree.

After hearings to assess his competence to make this decision, the execution date of November 4 was set by the state Supreme Court on September 26, 2005.

== Execution ==
Wise was executed by the method he had chosen, lethal injection, at the Broad River Correctional Institution on Friday, November 4, 2005. He chose to make no final statement but did order a last meal of lobster back, french fries, coleslaw, banana pudding and milk. During the execution process, he just stared at the ceiling. He was pronounced dead at 6:18 p.m. EST.

Wise was the second person executed in South Carolina in 2005 and the thirty-fourth inmate executed there since the death penalty was reinstated in 1976. According to a roster maintained by the prosecutor of Clark County, Indiana, Wise was the 992nd person to be executed nationwide since the restoration of the death penalty in 1976.

== Civil suits ==
Ten people who were survivors of the shooting, or relatives of the dead, filed a civil suit against the security firm for which Vance worked, Regent Security Services. Federal District Court Judge Cameron Currie oversaw the settlement which was reached Monday, November 5, 2001, just one day before the case was scheduled to go to trial. The amount of the settlement was not disclosed.

Vance himself sued R.E. Phelon, and settled with them in March 2001 prior to the Regent Security Services settlement. Vance's argument was that Phelon failed to warn him that Hastings Wise had a history of prior disruptions there. The amount of Vance's settlement was also undisclosed.

Phelon and its insurer, Liberty Mutual, brought four suits against Regent on behalf of 32 employees who received workers' compensation payments for injuries and trauma related to the event. In July 2001, Phelon and Liberty dropped the four state lawsuits and intervened in the federal lawsuits filed by the victims, hoping to recover some of the over $380,000 spent on the work comp claims.

== See also ==
- Capital punishment in South Carolina
- Capital punishment in the United States
- List of people executed in South Carolina
- List of people executed in the United States in 2005
- Volunteer (capital punishment)

Executions carried out in South Carolina
Preceded by Richard Longworth April 15, 2005	Hastings Arthur Wise; November 4, 2005	Succeeded by Shawn Paul Humphries December 2, 2005
Executions carried out in the United States
Preceded by Brian Steckel – Delaware November 4, 2005	Hastings Arthur Wise – South Carolina; November 4, 2005	Succeeded by Charles Thacker – Texas November 9, 2005
