= Joseph Ernest Atkins =

American murderer (1947–1999)

- Atkins during his murder trial in 1986
- Born: June 1947; North Charleston, South Carolina, U.S.
- Died: January 23, 1999 (aged 51); Broad River Correctional Institution, South Carolina, U.S.
- Status: Executed by lethal injection
- Convictions: Murder (3 counts); Assault with intent to kill (2 counts); First degree burglary Unlawful possession of a weapon (2 counts)
- Penalty: Death

Details
- Victims: 3
- Span of crimes: 1969–1985
- Country: United States
- State: South Carolina
- Weapon: Shotgun

Joseph Ernest Atkins (1947 – January 23, 1999) was an American serial killer and Vietnam War veteran who murdered three people in South Carolina. He murdered his half-brother in 1969 and received a life sentence. After Atkins's adoptive father pleaded for his release, he was released on parole in 1980. In 1985, Atkins murdered a 13-year-old neighbor girl and his adoptive father. Atkins was convicted of these two murders, sentenced to death, and executed in 1999.

Atkins's lawyers unsuccessfully argued for leniency, saying he was suffering a flashback from Vietnam at the time of the murders. Atkins had armed himself with a machete and was dressed in military fatigues when he committed the murders.

== Early life ==
Joseph was born in 1947. The unwanted child of a sex worker, he was adopted by Benjamin Frank Atkins and Gladys Atkins and lived in North Charleston, South Carolina. Joseph was frequently beaten and berated by his adoptive father, and attacked by his older half-brother, Charles Edward Atkins. On one occasion, he required surgery after Charles stabbed him repeatedly in the stomach. In addition, Joseph witnessed his adoptive father abuse his adoptive mother. He believed Gladys being hit in the head during the abuse caused the brain tumor which killed her when he was 15.

== Military service ==
Joseph was sent to fight in Vietnam in the late 1960s, fighting on the border of Cambodia and Laos. He saw people killed and mutilated, and heard fellow captured soldiers being tortured to death. He returned to the U.S. in October 1969 and was awarded a Vietnam Campaign Medal, a Vietnam Service Medal, and a National Defense Service Medal.

== Murders, trial, and execution ==
On December 31, 1969, Joseph and Charles Atkins, 23, were visiting a friend's house when the two got into a fight. Joseph went back to his adoptive father's house, several miles away. He retrieved a shotgun, returned to the friend's house, and fatally shot Charles then shot out the windows.

Joseph was indicted for murder in March 1970. Attorneys for both sides agreed to a guilty plea of manslaughter. On May 28, 1970, Joseph appeared before a judge, and said that "he [Charles] reached back like this in his back pocket where he had his gun, and I was scared he was going to shoot." The judge said he could not accept Joseph's guilty plea if he was claiming to have acted in self-defense. The plea deal fell through and the case went to trial. The jury rejected Joseph's claim of self-defense and he was found guilty of murder. They recommended mercy and he was sentenced to life in prison. Benjamin Atkins pleaded for his adoptive son's release and he was paroled on March 14, 1980. He returned to North Charleston to live with his girlfriend, Linda Walters, in half of a duplex owned by his father. He worked several jobs and had alcoholism problems. In the spring of 1985, Aaron Polite, his wife, Fatha Patterson, and their 13-year-old daughter, Karen Patterson, moved into the duplex. Joseph barely interacted with them.

On October 27, 1985, after a night of drinking, Joseph returned to the duplex dressed in military fatigues and armed with a machete, revolver, and a sawed-off shotgun. After waking and seeing Joseph, Aaron woke his wife, who tried to call Joseph's father, 75-year-old Benjamin Atkins, but Joseph had cut the phone lines. Aaron stayed inside as Fatha left to tell Benjamin. Joseph went to the couple's daughter's bedroom and shot Karen once in the head with the shotgun. Joseph chased and fired multiple shotgun rounds at Aaron. Benjamin and Fatha called the police. When Fatha opened the door, she saw Joseph pointing his shotgun at her. As Fatha backed away, Joseph walked out onto the porch and shot his adoptive father in the shoulder. Benjamin stumbled back inside, where he collapsed and died. Joseph fired through the walls into the duplex as Fatha shut the door and ran to the telephone. He then fled on his motorcycle. Aaron and Fatha found Karen in a pool of blood; she was taken to a hospital where she died.

Neighboring off-duty police officer Detective Schuster saw the flash of the gunshots and Joseph fleeing. He called for backup and chased Joseph for several miles. Joseph was arrested after crashing his motorcycle.

Arthur Henderson, the neighbor with whom Joseph had been drinking, testified that Joseph told him "when I go home anything I see in sight I'm going to kill."

In January 1986, Joseph Atkins was indicted for two counts of murder, two counts of assault with intent to kill, one count of first degree burglary, and two counts of unlawful possession of a weapon. Joseph's prior murder conviction elevated the crime to a capital offense. Prosecutors sought death sentences for both murders. In June 1986, Joseph was convicted of all charges. His defense team argued for leniency on the grounds of his alcoholism and intoxication at the time the murders. The prosecution pointed to the cutting of the phone lines as evidence that he was well aware of his actions.

Referring to Joseph's use of his military service as mitigation, the prosecution said:

And you go to that wall in Washington, and there are fifty thousand names of soldiers who have died, of heroes. You pick out any one of those names of the fifty thousand. Pick one out. Soldier, you've given the ultimate sacrifice. You've been there. Would your service in any way mitigate or excuse the horrible conduct of this defendant, the intentional, malicious murder of his father and of a 13-year-old, defenseless, innocent child? They would be insulted by the question were they alive, insulted by the question. To use that as an excuse for what went on here is insulting.

After deliberating for just over an hour, the jury recommended a death sentence on both counts. One of Joseph's appeals concerned the issue of parole eligibility. South Carolina did not have life without parole at the time of the murders. The jury asked the judge if they could impose consecutive life sentences, having been told that Joseph would become eligible for parole after 20 years of a life sentence. After the judge replied that the question of concurrent or consecutive sentences was his decision, the prosecution said the jury's actual question was if they could give Joseph a life sentence with no chance of parole for 40 years.

The judge said Joseph would become eligible for parole after 20 years regardless of whether his life sentences were consecutive or concurrent. In 1990, the South Carolina Supreme Court agreed in a 4-1 decision that multiple life terms with parole eligibility "cannot be aggregated, and are to be considered as one general sentence, the parole eligibility for which is 20 years".

After a failed appeal for clemency, Joseph was executed by lethal injection at Broad River Correctional Institution in Columbia, South Carolina, on January 23, 1999. He made no final statement.

== See also ==
- List of people executed in South Carolina
- List of people executed in the United States in 1999
- List of serial killers in the United States
- Charles Wooten
