= Joseph Lewis Clark =

American murderer (1949–2006)

- Mug shot of Joseph Lewis Clark.
- Born: January 15, 1949; Ohio, U.S.
- Died: May 2, 2006 (aged 57); Southern Ohio Correctional Facility, Lucasville, Ohio, U.S.
- Cause of death: Botched execution by lethal injection
- Status: Executed
- Convictions: Aggravated murder (2 counts); Escape; Robbery; Unarmed Robbery; Breaking and Entering; Petty Theft
- Penalty: Death

Joseph Lewis Clark (January 15, 1949 – May 2, 2006) was an American murderer executed by the State of Ohio. He was the 21st person executed by Ohio since the state resumed executions in 1999. Clark was sentenced to death on November 28, 1984, for the murder of 22-year-old David Manning during a gas station hold-up in Toledo, though he also confessed to the separate murder of Donald Harris, a convenience store employee.

== Details of Clark's crime ==
When Clark entered a Toledo gas station at approximately 9:00 p.m. on January 13, 1984, he had his .32 caliber revolver drawn. He demanded money, and the attendant, David A. Manning, handed him the money out of the cash register. After receiving the money, Clark claimed that this was not all the money Manning had. Manning then proceeded to give him an envelope, and it was at this point that Clark shot him. Clark stole sixty dollars in the hold-up.

On January 16, 1984, Clark was arrested after allegedly committing an assault and robbery at an Ohio bank. The arresting officer found a .32 caliber revolver in Clark's coat pocket. The next day, Clark, aware that he was a suspect in the Manning murder, tried to hang himself in his jail cell. On January 23, 1984, he was released from the hospital and taken to the Toledo Police Detective Bureau, where he was read his Miranda rights and subsequently confessed to the murder of Manning after his Miranda rights were again recited to him.

Following Clark's indictment for Manning's murder, Clark challenged the voluntariness of his statement to the police, and an evidentiary hearing was held on the issue. At the suppression hearing, a psychiatrist testified on behalf of Clark. Although the psychiatrist had not examined Clark, he had reviewed the medical records from the hospitalization following Clark's attempt at freedom, as well as Clark's juvenile records, various police documents, and the court's diagnostic and treatment reports. Based on a review of these records, he noted that Clark's mental function would be considered "borderline defective" based on his reported I.Q. of 75. He also concluded that Clark suffered from acute brain damage and chronic impairment of his mental functioning at the time of his confession (apparently due to Clark's recent suicide attempt). The psychiatrist testified that Clark's impaired mental condition would have interfered with his ability to make choices in an informed and reasonable manner and would have rendered him more susceptible to pressure or duress from others.

The prosecution offered in response the testimony of the officers who interrogated Clark and the testimony of Clark's attending physician, who concluded that, from a medical-neurological standpoint, Clark was capable of deciding on waiving his rights. Following the suppression hearing, the state trial court determined that Clark voluntarily and knowingly waived his right against self-incrimination. Clark's confession was subsequently introduced at trial.

== Execution ==
The execution took nearly 90 minutes because prison officials had difficulty finding a vein. It took the execution team twenty-two minutes to find a vein in Joseph Clark's arm to insert the catheter. After a few minutes, the vein burst and Clark's arm began to swell. Clark pushed himself up and even said, "It don't work!" The team tried to find another vein for thirty minutes, while witnesses heard "groans, screams and guttural noises". Joseph Clark was pronounced dead around ninety minutes after his execution had begun.

Clark's mother sued the head of Ohio's prisons after the execution.

== See also ==
- Capital punishment in Ohio
- Capital punishment in the United States
- List of people executed in Ohio
- List of people executed in the United States in 2006

== Sources ==
=== General references ===
- Clark Prosecutor
- Clark v. Mitchell, 425 F.3d 270
- State v. Clark, 1998 Ohio App. LEXIS 3688
- State v. Clark, 1986 Ohio App. LEXIS 9408
- Execution of Joseph Lewis Clark fails to go smoothly, Copley News Service, May 2, 2006
- Erica Ryan. Botched execution fires up opponents of death penalty. The Columbus Dispatch (2006-05-04). Retrieved on 2007-11-05.
- Jim Provance and Christina Hall. Clark execution raises lethal-injection issues. The Blade – Toledo, Ohio (2006-05-04). Retrieved on 2007-11-05.

Executions carried out in Ohio
Preceded by Glenn Lee Benner II February 7, 2006	Joseph Lewis Clark; May 2, 2006	Succeeded by Rocky Barton July 12, 2006
Executions carried out in the United States
Preceded by Dexter Vinson – Virginia April 27, 2006	Joseph Lewis Clark – Ohio; May 2, 2006	Succeeded by Jackie Wilson – Texas May 4, 2006
