= List of white defendants executed for killing a black victim =

Executions of white defendants for killing black victims are rare. Since the reinstatement of capital punishment in the United States in 1976, only 21 white people have been executed solely for killing a black person (less than 1.36% of all executions), whereas 299 black people have been executed solely for killing a white person (nearly 19.4% of all executions). Of the 21 white people executed for killing a black victim, seven were put to death for racially motivated murders. In addition, 13 white people have been executed for murders involving a black victim and one or more victims of another race; four of these cases were racially motivated.

Prior to the 1976 reinstatement of capital punishment in the United States, the last confirmed execution of a white person for the killing of a black person was on April 15, 1944, when Fred L. Brady was executed for the robbery and murder of Joe Williams in Kansas.

== List of white defendants executed for killing black victims in the United States since 1976 ==
Indicates cases where the executed defendant killed multiple people of different races

No.	Date of execution	Executed person	Age	State	Method	Victim(s)	Ref.
1	September 6, 1991	Donald Henry Gaskins	58	South Carolina	Electrocution	Rudolph Tyner (Note: The murder occurred in prison and the victim was a death row inmate. The defendant was a serial killer already serving multiple life sentences for the murders of nine other victims. Codefendant Tony Cimo, a white male, was allowed to plead guilty to lesser charges and served two years and nine months of an 8-year sentence. The deal was offered since Cimo had no criminal history and the victim was on death row for murdering Cimo's parents.)	
2	January 24, 1995	Kermit Smith Jr.	37	North Carolina	Lethal injection	Whelette Collins	
3	March 20, 1995	Thomas Joseph Grasso	32	Oklahoma	Lethal injection	Hilda Johnson (Note: The defendant requested a death sentence and waived his appeals. He was also convicted of the murder of a white male in New York.)	
4	July 1, 1995	Roger Dale Stafford	43	Oklahoma	Lethal injection	9 people (1 black, 1 hispanic, and 5 white males, 2 white females) (Note: The victims were: Isaac Freeman, Louis Zacarias, Terri Horst, Linda Lorenz, David Lindsey, Melvin Lorenz, Richard Lorenz, David Salsman, and Anthony Tew. Codefendant Verna Stafford, a white female, received a life sentence.)	
5	December 6, 1995	Robert Earl O'Neal Jr.	34	Missouri	Lethal injection	Arthur Dade (Note: The murder occurred in prison and was racially motivated. The defendant was already serving a life sentence for the murder of a white male and was a member of the Aryan Brotherhood. Codefendants Lloyd Schlup and Rodnie Stewart, both of whom were fellow Aryan Brotherhood members, were also convicted in the murder. Stewart was sentenced to life in prison and Schlup was sentenced to death. Schlup, whose guilt was questioned, won an appeal and received a life sentence after pleading guilty to a lesser charge.)	
6	June 6, 1997	Henry Francis Hays	42	Alabama	Electrocution	Michael Donald (Note: The murder was racially motivated. The defendant was a member of the Ku Klux Klan. The jury voted in favor of life imprisonment, but the judge overruled the verdict and sentenced the defendant to death. Codefendant James Knowles, a 17-year-old white male, received a life sentence after pleading guilty and agreeing to testify against the defendant. He was paroled in 2006.)	
7	December 11, 1997	Thomas Howard Beavers Jr.	26	Virginia	Lethal injection	Marguerite Lowery	
8	March 6, 1998	John David Arnold Jr.	43	South Carolina	Lethal injection	Betty Gardner (Note: The murder was racially motivated.)	
9	July 10, 1998	John Herman Plath	43	South Carolina	Lethal injection	Betty Gardner	
10	September 25, 1998	Sammy Roberts	40	South Carolina	Lethal injection	3 people (1 black and 2 white males) (Note: The victims were Louis Cakley, Kenneth Krause, and Bill Spain. Codefendant Henry Copeland, a white male, was also sentenced to death, but died on death row in 1986.)	
11	April 28, 1999	Eric Christopher Payne	26	Virginia	Lethal injection	Ruth Parham and Sally Fazio (1 black and 1 white female) (Note: The defendant waived his appeals.)	
12	July 6, 1999	Gary Michael Heidnik	55	Pennsylvania	Lethal injection	Deborah Dudley and Sandra Lindsay	
13	July 8, 1999	Norman Lee Newsted	45	Oklahoma	Lethal injection	Larry Donnell Buckley (Note: The defendant was also convicted of the murders of three white victims in Utah which was a key reason for his death sentence.)	
14	July 21, 1999	Tommy David Strickler	33	Virginia	Lethal injection	Leann Whitlock (Note: Codefendant Ronald Henderson, a white male, received a life sentence.)	
15	May 3, 2002	Richard Charles Johnson	39	South Carolina	Lethal injection	Bruce Kenneth Smalls (Note: The victim was a police officer. The defendant was also convicted of the murder of a white male and sentenced to life.)	
16	September 10, 2003	Larry Allen Hayes	54	Texas	Lethal injection	Rosalyn Ann Robinson and Mary Evelyn Hayes (1 black and 1 white female) (Note: The defendant waived his appeals.)	
17	July 14, 2006	William Ernest Downs Jr.	39	South Carolina	Lethal injection	Keenan O'Mailia (Note: The victim was a minor. The defendant requested a death sentence and waived his appeals. He was also convicted of the murder of a white victim (another minor) in Georgia.)	
18	July 20, 2006	Brandon Wayne Hedrick	27	Virginia	Electrocution	Lisa Yvonne Crider (Note: Codefendant Trevor Jones, a white male, received a life sentence.)	
19	November 9, 2006	John Yancey Schmitt	33	Virginia	Lethal injection	Earl Shelton Dunning	
20	September 12, 2007	Daryl Keith Holton	45	Tennessee	Electrocution	4 people (1 black female, 3 white males) (Note: The victims were Kayla Holton, Brent Holton, Eric Holton, and Stephen Holton. The defendant waived his appeals.)	
21	June 6, 2008	David Mark Hill	48	South Carolina	Lethal injection	3 people (1 black female, 2 white males) (Note: The victims were: Josie Curry, Michael Gregory, and James Riddle. Racial animus was a factor in the murder of the black victim.)	
22	February 17, 2011	Frank G. Spisak Jr.	59	Ohio	Lethal injection	3 people (2 black and 1 white males) (Note: The victims were: Reverend Horace T. Rickerson, Brian Warford, and Timothy Sheehan. The defendant was a member of the American Nazi Party and the murders were racially motivated.)	
23	June 16, 2011	Lee Andrew Taylor	32	Texas	Lethal injection	Donta Green (Note: The murder occurred in prison and was racially motivated. The defendant was already serving a life sentence for his role in the murder of a white male and was a member of the Aryan Brotherhood. Codefendant Daniel Richbourg, a white male, was convicted of murder and sentenced to 48 years in prison.)	
24	September 21, 2011	Lawrence Russell Brewer	44	Texas	Lethal injection	James Byrd Jr. (Note: The murder was racially motivated. The defendant was a Neo-Nazi and the leader of a white supremacist prison gang. Codefendant John King, also a Neo-Nazi and a member of a white supremacist prison gang, was sentenced to death and executed as well. A third defendant, Shawn Berry, whose motive is disputed, received a life sentence after the prosecution conceded that he was not a white supremacist.)	
25	February 8, 2012	Edwin Hart Turner	38	Mississippi	Lethal injection	Eddie Brooks and Everett Curry (Note: Codefendant Paul Stewart, a 17-year-old White male, received a life sentence. Stewart was paroled in 2019 since he was a juvenile at the time of the murders.)	
26	September 25, 2012	Cleve Foster	48	Texas	Lethal injection	Nyanuer Gatluak "Mary" Pal (Note: The defendant was also linked to the murder of a White female. Codefendant Sheldon Ward, a White male, was also sentenced to death, but died on death row in 2010.)	
27	January 16, 2013	Robert Charles Gleason Jr.	42	Virginia	Electrocution	Aaron Alexander Cooper and Harvey Gray Watson Jr. (1 black and 1 white male) (Note: Both murders occurred in prison. The defendant, who was already serving a life sentence for the murder of a White male, asked for a death sentence, threatened to kill again unless he was executed, and waived his appeals.)	
28	March 6, 2013	Frederick Treesh	48	Ohio	Lethal injection	Henry Dupree (Note: The defendant was linked to the murder of an Asian male. At his trial, prosecutors presented a videotape in which he admitted to several other murders, including the lynching of a black man.)	
29	September 25, 2013	Harry Mitts Jr.	61	Ohio	Lethal injection	John A. Bryant and Dennis Glivar (1 black and 1 white male) (Note: The murder of the Black victim was racially motivated. The White victim was a police officer.)	
30	January 11, 2017	Christopher Chubasco Wilkins	48	Texas	Lethal injection	Willie Ladell Freeman and Mike Silva (1 black and 1 hispanic male)	
31	July 6, 2017	William Charles Morva	35	Virginia	Lethal injection	Derrick McFarland and Eric Sutphin (1 black and 1 white male) (Note: The White victim was a police officer, and the Black victim was a hospital security guard.)	
32	August 24, 2017	Mark James Asay	53	Florida	Lethal injection	Robert Lee Booker and Robert McDowell (1 black and 1 mixed-race male) (Note: The murders were racially motivated. The Mixed-race victim was White and Hispanic. During the defendant's trial, the court believed this victim was also Black.)	
33	April 24, 2019	John William King	44	Texas	Lethal injection	James Byrd Jr. (Note: The murder was racially motivated. The defendant was a Neo-Nazi and a member of a white supremacist prison gang. Codefendant Lawrence Brewer, also a Neo-Nazi and a member of a white supremacist prison gang, was sentenced to death and executed as well. A third defendant, Shawn Berry, whose motive is disputed, received a life sentence after the prosecution conceded that he was not a white supremacist.)	
34	October 14, 2025	Samuel Lee Smithers	72	Florida	Lethal injection	Denise Roach and Cristy Cowan (1 black and 1 white female)	

== Demographics ==
Sex
Male	34	100%
Female	0	0%
Date of execution
1976–1979	0	0%
1980–1989	0	0%
1990–1999	14	42%
2000–2009	7	21%
2010–2019	12	35%
2020–2029	1	3%
Age
20–29	3	9%
30–39	10	29%
40–49	14	41%
50–59	5	15%
60–69	1	3%
70–79	1	3%
State
South Carolina	7	21%
Virginia	7	21%
Texas	6	18%
Ohio	3	9%
Oklahoma	3	9%
Florida	2	6%
Alabama	1	3%
Mississippi	1	3%
Missouri	1	3%
North Carolina	1	3%
Pennsylvania	1	3%
Tennessee	1	3%
Method
Lethal injection	29	85%
Electrocution	5	15%
Total	34	100%

== List of white defendants executed for crimes against black victims in the United States (pre-1972) ==
At least 55 white people were executed in the US for crimes against black people before 1972. Of those, 52 were executed for murder, one was executed for attempted murder, one was executed for kidnapping, and one was executed for "engaging in the slave trade" under the Piracy Law of 1820. Twenty white people were executed for crimes against slaves, 18 for murder, one for attempted murder, and one for slave trading.

No.	Date of death	Inmate	Age	Sex	Method	State	Crime	Victim(s)	Ref.
1	November 23, 1739	John Cobidge	Unknown	Male	Hanging	Virginia	Murder	Unknown female (Note: The victim was a slave. The defendant was an indentured servant.)	
2	November 23, 1739	Charles Quin	Unknown	Male	Hanging	Virginia	Murder	Unknown male (Note: The victim was a slave. One of the defendants was an overseer.)	
3	November 23, 1739	David White	Unknown	Male	Hanging	Virginia	Murder	Unknown male	
4	May 13, 1747	Thomas Lamb	Unknown	Male	Hanging	Maryland	Murder	Nacy (male) (Note: The victim was a slave.)	
5	July 1752	Pierre Antoine Dochenet	24	Male	Hanging	Louisiana	Attempted murder	Unknown (2 black females) (Note: The victims were slaves.)	
6	October 12, 1770	John Jones	Unknown	Male	Hanging	Maryland	Murder-Slave stealing (Note: Sentenced to death for stealing and murdering the victims, but technically only received a death warrant for slave stealing since the evidence for the latter charge was stronger.)	Jem and Sarah (black male and female) (Note: The victims were slaves. Jem was a 6-month-old boy.)	
7	May 12, 1775	William Pitman	Unknown (Note: Said to be in his 40s or 50s.)	Male	Hanging	Virginia	Murder	Unknown male (Note: The victim was a minor and a slave owned by the defendant. Black people were not allowed to serve as witnesses against white people at the time, but the defendant was convicted after his son and daughter testified against him at his trial.)	
8	January 31, 1789	Matthew Farley Jr.	42	Male	Hanging	Virginia	Murder	Unknown male (Note: The victim was a slave owned by the defendant. Codefendant Thomas Farley was convicted of murder and sentenced to death, but reprieved.)	
9	November 25, 1803	Gabriel Reed	Unknown	Male	Hanging	Virginia	Murder	James Butts (Note: The victim was a slave.)	
10	1806	Micajah Johnson	Unknown	Male	Hanging	North Carolina	Kidnapping (Note: The defendant kidnapped a free black boy in North Carolina and sold him into slavery in Virginia.)	Unknown male (Note: The victim was a minor.)	
11	November 10, 1820	Mason Scott	19	Male	Hanging	North Carolina	Murder	Caleb (Note: The victim was a slave.)	
12	July 27, 1821	Isaac Jones	Unknown	Male	Hanging	Mississippi	Murder	Unknown male (Note: The victim was a slave.)	
13	April 25, 1822	Samuel Green	26	Male	Hanging	Massachusetts	Murder	Billy Williams (Note: The murder occurred in prison. The defendant was a serial killer who was implicated in numerous other murders and killed the victim in retaliation for him reporting his escape plot.)	
14	October 1, 1823	Jeff King	Unknown	Male	Hanging	Kentucky	Murder	Unknown male (Note: The victim was a runaway slave who accompanied the defendant after being promised freedom. The defendant later decided to sell the slave, then murdered him after the slave threatened to reveal that he was stolen.)	
15	May 28, 1829	George Chapman	Unknown	Male	Hanging	New York	Murder	Daniel Wright	
16	July 2, 1836	John Hallock	Unknown	Male	Hanging	New York	Murder	Nell (female)	
17	May 15, 1840	John Hoover	58	Male	Hanging	North Carolina	Murder	Mira (female) (Note: The victim was a slave owned by the defendant.)	
18	September 19, 1851	Aaron Stookey	42	Male	Hanging	New York	Murder	Zeddy Moore	
19	July 2, 1852	Jean Adam	Unknown	Male	Hanging	Louisiana	Murder-Burglary	Mary (Note: The victim was a minor and a slave.)	
20	July 2, 1852	Anthony Delisle	Unknown	Male	Hanging	Louisiana	Murder-Burglary	Mary	
21	January 14, 1853	L. A. J. Stubbs	Unknown	Male	Hanging	South Carolina	Murder	Unknown male (Note: The victim was a slave owned by the defendant.)	
22	March 3, 1854	William Blackledge	Unknown	Male	Hanging	South Carolina	Murder	Joe (male) (Note: The victim was a runaway slave, but was not owned by either of the defendants. Motley was a slave owner and Blackledge was an overseer who had been implicated in the murders of other runaway slaves.)	
23	March 3, 1854	Thomas Motley	Unknown	Male	Hanging	South Carolina	Murder	Joe (male)	
24	June 2, 1854	James Wilson	Unknown	Male	Hanging	Texas	Murder	Bill (male) (Note: The victim was a slave. The defendant had been in a dispute with the victim's owner, whom he had threatened to kill on several occasions. When the defendant arrived at the owner's farm to carry out his threat, the owner was not present. As a result, the defendant instead murdered the victim, who was described as the owner's favorite slave.)	
25	June 8, 1860	Benjamin F. Norman	Unknown	Male	Hanging	Kentucky	Murder	George Johnson (Note: Codefendants Stephen Durrall and John Baggett, both white males, were also charged with murder. Durrall was also convicted of murder and sentenced to death, but it is unclear whether he was executed. Baggett jumped bail after his trial ended with a hung jury.)	
26	February 21, 1862	Nathaniel Gordon	36	Male	Hanging	Federal government	Piracy (Note: The defendant was a slave trader who was convicted of engaging in the slave trade, which was deemed an act of piracy and thus a capital offense under the Piracy Law of 1820.)	Unknown (at least 29 black people) (Note: The defendant transported 897 black victims, of whom at least 29 died. 563 of the victims being transported were minors. The defendant was also linked to at least two other slave voyages and is suspected of a third, in which hundreds of other black victims are believed to have died. Codefendants William Warren, David Hall, Thomas Nelson, Samuel Sleeper, Thomas Savage, and John McCafferty, all white males, were convicted of or pleaded guilty to lesser charges under the Slave Trade Act of 1800. Warren was sentenced to eight months in prison, Hall to nine months in prison, and the others each to 3.5 months in prison.)	
27	January 23, 1863	Frederick Letz	20	Male	Hanging	Military	Murder	Tom (Note: The murder was racially motivated.)	
28	October 26, 1866	David Howell	Unknown	Male	Hanging	Georgia	Murder	Henry Gamble	
29	November 18, 1870	Ezekiel McAbee	21	Male	Hanging	South Carolina	Murder	Simon Latham	
30	October 27, 1871	William B. Parker	51	Male	Hanging	North Carolina	Murder	Thomas Price	
31	August 7, 1872	Eli Chavis	27	Male	Hanging	South Carolina	Murder	Adam Jackson	
32	January 16, 1874	Joseph Baker	35	Male	Hanging	North Carolina	Murder	Newton Wilfong (Note: The defendant was a Confederate veteran.)	
33	June 19, 1876	William Foster	26	Male	Hanging	Missouri	Murder	Unknown male	
34	December 7, 1877	Harvey Thorpe	22	Male	Hanging	New York	Murder	Howard (Note: The murder occurred in prison.)	
35	March 15, 1878	Augustus J. Johnson	24	Male	Hanging	Georgia	Murder	Daniel Alford (Note: The murder was racially motivated. The defendant confessed to four murders on the gallows and is suspected of additional murders.)	
36	May 14, 1880	Thomas White	28	Male	Hanging	South Carolina	Murder	Pete Hawkins	
37	December 17, 1880	Daniel Keith	42	Male	Hanging	North Carolina	Murder-Rape	Alice Ellis (Note: The victim was a minor, aged 9.)	
38	February 25, 1881	John Von der Heide	24	Male	Hanging	Kentucky	Murder	Rebecca Johnson (Note: The victim was a minor, aged 13.)	
39	June 19, 1885	William Morrow	34	Male	Hanging	Tennessee	Murder	Dick Overton (Note: The defendant was already serving a life sentence for the murder of another black male at the time of his conviction. Both murders may have been racially motivated, as the defendant accused both of them of trying to rape his daughter, but there is no evidence for these allegations. The defendant also implicated his father, who was never prosecuted, in the murder.)	
40	March 19, 1890	Mel J. Cheatham	40	Male	Hanging	Mississippi	Murder	Jim Tilghman	
41	July 10, 1896	America "Mary" Snodgrass	18 (Note: Misreported as 28.)	Female	Hanging	Virginia	Murder	Unknown (Note: The victim was the defendant's six-month-old biracial child, whom she burned alive. Also the last woman to be executed for the infanticide of her own child in the United States.)	
42	January 23, 1899	George W. Hite	65	Male	Hanging	Virginia	Murder	William Bowers (Note: The defendant was a Confederate veteran and had previously served a prison term for malicious shooting.)	
43	June 21, 1910	Antonio Fornaro	31	Male	Electrocution	New York	Murder	Agnes Johnson	
44	November 27, 1911	James W. Gatlin (Note: Also known as A. J. O'Berry.)	26	Male	Hanging	Georgia	Murder-Burglary	Mary Randolph and Mary Randolph Jr. (black females) (Note: Racial animus was a factor in the murders. One of the victims was a minor, aged 13.)	
45	July 26, 1912	John Bailey	22	Male	Hanging	Tennessee	Murder-Robbery	3 people (2 black males and 1 black female) (Note: The victims were: Ben Pettigrew, Fred Pettigrew, and Pearl Pettigrew. The murders were racially motivated. Fred and Pearl were minors (aged 13 and 12). Bailey, Shelton, and two codefendants, also white males, were caught at the scene and chased by a posse, but only Bailey and Shelton were captured. In his final confession before his execution, Bailey named Lige Scott and Grover Hardcastle as the two killers who escaped and said Scott was the ringleader. Scott was arrested and charged as an accessory to murder, but the charges were dropped due to insufficient evidence. Hardcastle was never apprehended.)	
46	July 26, 1912	George Shelton	19	Male	Hanging	Tennessee	Murder-Robbery	3 people (2 black males and 1 black female)	
47	March 21, 1913	Arthur Jones	28	Male	Hanging	Alabama	Murder-Robbery	John Holland (Note: Codefendant Walter Jones, a white male, was sentenced to life in prison, and codefendant John Watson, also a white male, was granted immunity in exchange for turning state's evidence. Walter Jones was later executed after being convicted of the murder of a white male. All four defendants were members of a gang that had been implicated in at least 55 murders. Arthur Jones confessed to his participation in three murders.)	
48	March 21, 1913	William Watson	28	Male	Hanging	Alabama	Murder-Robbery	John Holland	
49	December 7, 1923	John Karayians	34	Male	Electrocution	Ohio	Murder	David Gamble (Note: The defendant also critically wounded a white police officer by shooting him in his spinal column and later tried to murder a fellow inmate for testifying against him as the jury deliberated on his fate.)	
50	March 20, 1936	Erleon Whitehead	35	Male	Electrocution	Kentucky	Murder-Burglary	John Allen	
51	February 18, 1938	Milford Exum	40	Male	Gas chamber	North Carolina	Murder-Burglary	James Williams (Note: Codefendant Earl Sasser, a white male, was also sentenced to death. However, his conviction was set aside in an agreement with the judge and the prosecution. Sasser then pleaded guilty to being an accessory to murder and was resentenced to life in prison. He was paroled in 1949.)	
52	April 25, 1938	Edward Rose	22	Male	Electrocution	Pennsylvania	Murder-Robbery	Floyd Tranon (Note: The three defendants also gang raped the victim's girlfriend and were part of a seven-member gang that had committed a violent crime spree involving multiple rapes and robberies. Codefendant Leon Butler, a black male, was acquitted of murder in the same case. The other four members of the gang, all of whom were white males, received prison terms since they were only implicated in rape and robbery, neither of which were capital crimes in Pennsylvania.)	
53	April 25, 1938	Theodore Duminiak	20	Male	Electrocution	Pennsylvania	Murder-Robbery	Floyd Tranon	
54	April 25, 1938	John Oreszak	20	Male	Electrocution	Pennsylvania	Murder-Robbery	Floyd Tranon	
55	April 15, 1944	Fred L. Brady	46	Male	Hanging	Kansas	Murder-Robbery	Joe Williams	

== Demographics (pre-1972) ==
Sex
Male	54	98%
Female	1	2%
Date of execution
1700–1750	4	7%
1750–1800	4	5%
1800–1850	9	15%
1850–1900	25	45%
1900–1950	13	24%
1950–1972	0	0%
Age
Unknown	21	36%
10–19	3	5%
20–29	16	29%
30–39	7	13%
40–49	4	7%
50–59	2	4%
60–69	1	2%
State
Virginia	8	13%
North Carolina	7	11%
South Carolina	6	11%
New York	5	9%
Kentucky	4	7%
Georgia	3	5%
Louisiana	3	5%
Pennsylvania	3	5%
Tennessee	3	5%
Alabama	2	4%
Maryland	2	4%
Mississippi	2	4%
Federal government	1	2%
Kansas	1	2%
Massachusetts	1	2%
Missouri	1	2%
Ohio	1	2%
Texas	1	2%
US military	1	2%
Method
Hanging	48	84%
Electrocution	6	11%
Gas chamber	1	2%
Total	55	100%

== See also ==
- List of death row inmates in the United States
- List of United States Supreme Court decisions on capital punishment
- List of women executed in the United States since 1976
- Race and capital punishment in the United States
- Racism against Black Americans
