= List of people executed in the United States in 2006 =

Fifty-three people were executed in the United States in 2006. Twenty-four of them were in the state of Texas. One (Brandon Wayne Hedrick) was executed via electrocution in Virginia. The states of California, Montana, Nevada, and North Carolina have not carried out an execution since 2006; however, all four states retain capital punishment as a legal penalty.

== List of people executed in the United States in 2006 ==
| No. | Date of execution | Name | Age of person | | | Gender | Ethnicity | State | Method | Ref. |
| No. | Date of execution | Name | At execution | At offense | Age difference | Gender | Ethnicity | State | Method | Ref. |
|---|---|---|---|---|---|---|---|---|---|---|
| 1 | January 17, 2006 | Clarence Ray Allen | 76 | 50 | 26 | Male | Native American | California | Lethal injection | |
| 2 | January 20, 2006 | Perrie Dyon Simpson | 43 | 21 | 22 | Male | Black | North Carolina | Lethal injection | |
| 3 | January 25, 2006 | Marion Butler Dudley | 33 | 20 | 13 | Male | Black | Texas | Lethal injection | |
| 4 | January 27, 2006 | Marvin Bieghler | 58 | 33 | 25 | Male | White | Indiana | Lethal injection | |
| 5 | January 31, 2006 | Jaime Elizalde Jr. | 34 | 22 | 12 | Male | Hispanic | Texas | Lethal injection | |
| 6 | February 7, 2006 | Glenn Lee Benner II | 43 | 22 | 21 | Male | White | Ohio | Lethal injection | |
| 7 | February 8, 2006 | Robert James Neville Jr. | 31 | 23 | 8 | Male | White | Texas | Lethal injection | |
| 8 | February 15, 2006 | Clyde Smith Jr. | 32 | 18 | 14 | Male | Black | Texas | Lethal injection | |
| 9 | March 15, 2006 | Tommie Collins Hughes | 31 | 22 | 9 | Male | Black | Texas | Lethal injection | |
| 10 | March 17, 2006 | Patrick Lane Moody | 39 | 28 | 11 | Male | White | North Carolina | Lethal injection | |
| 11 | March 22, 2006 | Robert Madrid Salazar Jr. | 27 | 18 | 9 | Male | Hispanic | Texas | Lethal injection | |
| 12 | March 29, 2006 | Kevin Christopher Kincy | 38 | 25 | 13 | Male | Black | Texas | Lethal injection | |
| 13 | April 18, 2006 | Richard Alford Thornburg Jr. | 40 | 31 | 9 | Male | White | Oklahoma | Lethal injection | |
| 14 | April 20, 2006 | Willie Brown Jr. | 61 | 38 | 23 | Male | Black | North Carolina | Lethal injection | |
| 15 | April 26, 2006 | Daryl Linnie Mack | 47 | 30 | 17 | Male | Black | Nevada | Lethal injection | |
| 16 | April 27, 2006 | Dexter Lee Vinson | 43 | 34 | 9 | Male | Black | Virginia | Lethal injection | |
| 17 | May 2, 2006 | Joseph Lewis Clark | 57 | 34 | 23 | Male | Black | Ohio | Lethal injection | |
| 18 | May 4, 2006 | Jackie Barron Wilson | 39 | 21 | 18 | Male | Hispanic | Texas | Lethal injection | |
| 19 | May 17, 2006 | Jermaine Herron | 27 | 18 | 9 | Male | Black | Texas | Lethal injection | |
| 20 | May 24, 2006 | Jesús Ledesma Aguilar | 42 | 31 | 11 | Male | Hispanic | Texas | Lethal injection | |
| 21 | June 1, 2006 | John Albert Boltz | 74 | 52 | 22 | Male | White | Oklahoma | Lethal injection | |
| 22 | June 6, 2006 | Timothy Tyler Titsworth | 34 | 21 | 13 | Male | White | Texas | Lethal injection | |
| 23 | June 20, 2006 | Lamont Reese | 28 | 21 | 7 | Male | Black | Texas | Lethal injection | |
| 24 | June 27, 2006 | Ángel Maturino Reséndiz | 46 | 38 | 7 | Male | Hispanic | Texas | Lethal injection | |
| 25 | June 28, 2006 | Sedley Alley | 50 | 29 | 21 | Male | White | Tennessee | Lethal injection | |
| 26 | July 11, 2006 | Sean Derrick O'Brien | 31 | 18 | 13 | Male | Black | Texas | Lethal injection | |
| 27 | July 12, 2006 | Rocky Lee Barton | 49 | 46 | 3 | Male | White | Ohio | Lethal injection | |
| 28 | July 14, 2006 | William Ernest Downs Jr. | 39 | 31 | 8 | Male | White | South Carolina | Lethal injection | |
| 29 | July 19, 2006 | Mauriceo Mashawn Brown | 31 | 21 | 10 | Male | Black | Texas | Lethal injection | |
| 30 | July 20, 2006 | Robert James Anderson | 40 | 26 | 14 | Male | White | Texas | Lethal injection | |
| 31 | July 20, 2006 | Brandon Wayne Hedrick | 27 | 18 | 9 | Male | White | Virginia | Electrocution | |
| 32 | July 27, 2006 | Michael William Lenz | 42 | 35 | 7 | Male | White | Virginia | Lethal injection | |
| 33 | August 3, 2006 | William E. Wyatt Jr. | 41 | 32 | 9 | Male | Black | Texas | Lethal injection | |
| 34 | August 8, 2006 | Darrell Wayne Ferguson | 28 | 23 | 5 | Male | White | Ohio | Lethal injection | |
| 35 | August 11, 2006 | David Thomas Dawson | 48 | 28 | 20 | Male | White | Montana | Lethal injection | |
| 36 | August 17, 2006 | Richard Hinojosa | 44 | 32 | 12 | Male | Hispanic | Texas | Lethal injection | |
| 37 | August 18, 2006 | Samuel Russell Flippen | 36 | 24 | 12 | Male | White | North Carolina | Lethal injection | |
| 38 | August 24, 2006 | Justin Chaz Fuller | 27 | 18 | 9 | Male | Black | Texas | Lethal injection | |
| 39 | August 29, 2006 | Eric Allen Patton | 49 | 37 | 12 | Male | Black | Oklahoma | Lethal injection | |
| 40 | August 31, 2006 | James Patrick Malicoat | 31 | 21 | 10 | Male | White | Oklahoma | Lethal injection | |
| 41 | August 31, 2006 | Derrick Wayne Frazier | 29 | 20 | 9 | Male | Black | Texas | Lethal injection | |
| 42 | September 12, 2006 | Farley Charles Matchett | 43 | 28 | 15 | Male | Black | Texas | Lethal injection | |
| 43 | September 20, 2006 | Clarence Edward Hill | 48 | 24 | 24 | Male | Black | Florida | Lethal injection | |
| 44 | October 18, 2006 | Arthur Dennis Rutherford | 57 | 36 | 21 | Male | White | Florida | Lethal injection | |
| 45 | October 18, 2006 | Bobby Glen Wilcher | 43 | 19 | 24 | Male | White | Mississippi | Lethal injection | |
| 46 | October 24, 2006 | Jeffrey Don Lundgren | 56 | 38 | 18 | Male | White | Ohio | Lethal injection | |
| 47 | October 25, 2006 | Daniel Harold Rolling | 52 | 36 | 16 | Male | White | Florida | Lethal injection | |
| 48 | October 25, 2006 | Gregory Lynn Summers | 48 | 32 | 16 | Male | White | Texas | Lethal injection | |
| 49 | October 26, 2006 | Larry Eugene Hutcherson | 37 | 22 | 15 | Male | White | Alabama | Lethal injection | |
| 50 | November 1, 2006 | Donell Okeith Jackson | 33 | 20 | 13 | Male | Black | Texas | Lethal injection | |
| 51 | November 8, 2006 | Willie Marcel Shannon | 33 | 19 | 14 | Male | Black | Texas | Lethal injection | |
| 52 | November 9, 2006 | John Yancey Schmitt | 33 | 25 | 8 | Male | White | Virginia | Lethal injection | |
| 53 | December 13, 2006 | Ángel Nieves Díaz | 55 | 28 | 27 | Male | Hispanic | Florida | Lethal injection | |
| | | Average: | 42 years | 27 years | 14 years | | | | | |

== Demographics ==
Gender
| Male | 53 | 100% |
| Female | 0 | 0% |
Ethnicity
| White | 24 | 45% |
| Black | 21 | 40% |
| Hispanic | 7 | 13% |
| Native American | 1 | 2% |
State
| Texas | 24 | 45% |
| Ohio | 5 | 9% |
| Florida | 4 | 8% |
| North Carolina | 4 | 8% |
| Oklahoma | 4 | 8% |
| Virginia | 4 | 8% |
| Alabama | 1 | 2% |
| California | 1 | 2% |
| Indiana | 1 | 2% |
| Mississippi | 1 | 2% |
| Montana | 1 | 2% |
| Nevada | 1 | 2% |
| South Carolina | 1 | 2% |
| Tennessee | 1 | 2% |
Method
| Lethal injection | 52 | 98% |
| Electrocution | 1 | 2% |
Month
| January | 5 | 9% |
| February | 3 | 6% |
| March | 4 | 8% |
| April | 4 | 8% |
| May | 4 | 8% |
| June | 5 | 9% |
| July | 7 | 13% |
| August | 9 | 17% |
| September | 2 | 4% |
| October | 6 | 11% |
| November | 3 | 6% |
| December | 1 | 2% |
Age
| 20–29 | 7 | 13% |
| 30–39 | 18 | 34% |
| 40–49 | 18 | 34% |
| 50–59 | 7 | 13% |
| 60–69 | 1 | 2% |
| 70–79 | 2 | 4% |
| Total | 53 | 100% |

== Executions in recent years ==
Number of executions
| 2007 | 42 |
| 2006 | 53 |
| 2005 | 60 |
| Total | 155 |

== See also ==
- List of death row inmates in the United States
- List of most recent executions by jurisdiction
- List of people scheduled to be executed in the United States
- List of women executed in the United States since 1976

| Preceded by 2005 | List of people executed in the United States in 2006 | Succeeded by 2007 |
