= Rocky Barton =

American murderer (1956–2006)

- Mugshot of Rocky Barton
- Born: July 28, 1956; Butler County, Ohio, U.S.
- Died: July 12, 2006 (aged 49); Southern Ohio Correctional Facility, Ohio, U.S.
- Occupation: Construction worker
- Spouse: Kimbirli Jo Barton (deceased)
- Status: Executed by lethal injection
- Convictions: Kentucky; Attempted murder Theft; Ohio; Aggravated murder Having weapon under disability Domestic violence Driving under the influence (3 counts)
- Penalty: Kentucky; 15 years imprisonment Theft; Ohio; Death (October 10, 2003)

Rocky Lee Barton (July 28, 1956 – July 12, 2006) was executed by the State of Ohio on July 12, 2006, for the murder of his fourth wife, 43-year-old Kimbirli Jo Barton, at their home in Waynesville, Ohio. Convicted on October 10, 2003, Barton spent almost three years on death row.

Kimbirli and Barton had gotten in a domestic dispute the morning of January 16, 2003, and she was returning home to gather her belongings in order to move out, when Barton ambushed her by making sure the gate to the driveway was locked behind her. Barton then appeared and shot Kimbirli once in the shoulder, then in the back with a shotgun. Barton's uncle and 17-year-old daughter witnessed the shooting. At trial, Barton admitted to the murder and told the jury that he deserved to die. Barton had a history of violence against women. On January 4, 1991, Barton attempted to murder his ex-wife Brenda Johnson in Kentucky. He beat her over the head with a shotgun until she passed out, tied her feet with electrical tape and her hands with an electrical cord, forced her to take several pills and lick the blood off his hands and clothes, ransacked her house, and then stabbed her three times in the back and cut her throat before leaving her for dead. Barton was convicted of attempted murder and theft and sentenced to 15 years in prison. He was paroled in 1999.

Rocky Barton also attempted to take his own life, but only succeeded in blowing off the lower half of his face. The State paid for his facial surgeries, which left him unrecognizable and required wearing a partial mask on his face. While awaiting trial, Rocky Barton was held in the Warren County Jail in Lebanon, Ohio. Due to the mask, he was referred to as "Darth Vader." At one time in particular, Rocky Barton and Kimberli's ex-husband were incarcerated at the Warren County Jail at the same time. The two were never held in the same pod.

Two months after his sentence, Barton filed his notice of direct appeal to the Ohio Supreme Court, but on October 4, 2004, Barton filed a pro se motion to withdraw appeal and waive counsel. The Ohio Supreme Court held oral argument in September 2005 and in October 2005 Barton filed another pro se motion to waive all review of his conviction. He opted not to apply for executive clemency.

Barton had worked as a construction laborer and horse trainer and had served time in prison before the murder. He admitted his parents' divorce, drug and alcohol use, as well as problems with depression and anxiety, had influenced his life.

== See also ==
- List of people executed in Ohio
- List of people executed in the United States in 2006
- Volunteer (capital punishment)

Executions carried out in Ohio
Preceded by Joseph Lewis Clark May 2, 2006	Rocky Barton; July 12, 2006	Succeeded by Darrell Ferguson August 8, 2006
Executions carried out in the United States
Preceded by Sean Derrick O'Brien – Texas July 11, 2006	Rocky Barton – Ohio; July 12, 2006	Succeeded by William Downs Jr. – South Carolina July 14, 2006
