= Murders of Alex Hopps and James Green =

1991 murders in Spartanburg, South Carolina, United States

The murders of Alex Hopps and James Green occurred on January 7, 1991, in Spartanburg, South Carolina. Hopps and Green were theater attendants at the WestGate Mall Cinema, where they were murdered during a robbery by David Rocheville (January 28, 1968 – December 3, 1999) of Duncan (formerly from Lowell, Massachusetts) and Richard Longworth (January 19, 1968 – April 15, 2005) of Lake Lanier. Both Rocheville and Longworth were executed for the crime by lethal injection, in 1999 and 2005, respectively.

== Murders ==
On the evening of January 7, 1991, Rocheville and Longworth decided, while driving around in their minivan, to rob the Westgate Mall Cinema VI, a six-screen movie theater operated by Litchfield Theatres at the time, in Spartanburg, South Carolina. After entering the theater, Longworth took his handgun from his shoulder holster and gave it to Rocheville, and the two viewed the movie Dances with Wolves for a short time. The two then proceeded into the lobby to implement their plan to rob the theater of money located in the ticket booth. When they encountered an usher, Alexander George Hopps, 19, walking down the hallway, Longworth knocked Hopps down, jumped on him, held his hand over Hopps' mouth, and dragged him outside of the theater through the side exit. As Longworth pinned Hopps against a waist-high bar that protected the air conditioning unit, Rocheville shot Hopps in the left side of the head. Rocheville then returned the gun to Longworth, who placed it back in his shoulder holster.

To reenter the theater, Longworth and Rocheville walked around to the front of the cinema and found the front doors locked. They motioned to James Todd Green, 24, a cinema employee to whom they had waved when they initially entered the theater, and Green opened the door. At that point, Longworth drew his gun and demanded that Green open the safe in the ticket booth. Longworth took several money bags from the safe and ascertained from Green that there were more bags in Green's automobile, ready for deposit. After retrieving those bags, Longworth and Rocheville forced Green into their minivan, which Longworth drove. Longworth again handed his gun to Rocheville and instructed him to shoot Green if he moved. After driving away from the theater, Longworth stopped the vehicle and instructed Green to get out, walk five paces, get on his knees, and stare straight ahead. At that point, Rocheville shot Green in the back of the head.

== Aftermath ==
Longworth and Rocheville were arrested the next day, after Rocheville led law enforcement officers to Green's body. After Longworth was arrested, he provided officers with a detailed statement of the crimes that he and Rocheville had committed. Each was indicted on two counts of murder, one count of kidnapping, and one count of armed robbery. Separate juries convicted them and sentenced them to death. Longworth was convicted and then sentenced to death on September 10, 1991.

Rocheville admitted that he killed Green but said that he was coerced into it and claimed that he was afraid that Longworth would kill him. Longworth claimed in his appeals that he had ineffective counsel during his trial. His trial attorney represented both Longworth and his parents, which he said resulted in a conflict of interest. Longworth said that his mother's history of domestic violence and alcohol abuse were mitigating circumstances that were withheld from the jury due to this conflict of interest. His mother had requested the information be kept secret as she would have lost her position as a foster parent.

Rocheville was executed on December 3, 1999, while Longworth was executed more than five years later, on April 15, 2005. Longworth was pronounced dead at 6:14 p.m. after being executed by lethal injection at the Broad River Correctional Institution. It was the 958th execution in the United States since the Gregg v. Georgia decision in 1976. For his last meal, he had a hamburger, french fries, and a chocolate milkshake.

In his final statement, which was read by his lawyer, he said that he could not ask for forgiveness from the families of the murder victims, knowing it would not be granted. He also said:

"I am morally and legally responsible for what happened. I hope they also know how deeply, truly sorry I am for what I have done. I hope my death brings them the peace they deserve. … I hope my family knows how much I love them, and how ashamed I am that I have tarnished their name. For the last 14 years I have tried to live my life as cleanly and as honorably as I was raised."

== See also ==
- Capital punishment in South Carolina
- Capital punishment in the United States
- List of people executed in South Carolina
- List of people executed in the United States in 1999
- List of people executed in the United States in 2005

Executions carried out in South Carolina
Preceded by Leroy Drayton; November 12, 1999	David Rocheville; December 3, 1999	Succeeded by Kevin Young; November 3, 2000
Executions carried out in the United States
Preceded by Cornel Cooks – Oklahoma; December 2, 1999	David Rocheville – South Carolina; December 3, 1999	Succeeded by David Martin Long – Texas; December 8, 1999
Executions carried out in South Carolina
Preceded by James Neil Tucker; May 28, 2004	Richard Longworth; April 15, 2005	Succeeded by Hastings Arthur Wise; November 4, 2005
Executions carried out in the United States
Preceded by Glen Ocha – Florida; April 5, 2005	Richard Longworth – South Carolina; April 15, 2005	Succeeded by Douglas Roberts – Texas; April 20, 2005
