= Murder of Keenan O'Mailia =

1999 rape and murder of a young boy in South Carolina

Keenan O'Mailia
- Born: Keenan Andre O'Mailia; January 7, 1993; Oregon, U.S.
- Died: April 17, 1999 (aged 6); North Augusta, South Carolina, U.S.
- Cause of death: Death by strangulation
- Education: Hammond Hill Elementary School
- Known for: Victim of a kidnapping, rape, and murder case

On April 17, 1999, Keenan Andre O'Mailia (January 7, 1993 – April 17, 1999), a six-year-old African-American boy, was abducted while riding his bicycle near his home in North Augusta, South Carolina, and he was later raped and strangled to death in a nearby park. The abductor, William Ernest Downs Jr. (July 12, 1967 – July 14, 2006), was arrested a week after the killing, and charged with murder. Downs was also considered a suspect in the 1991 rape and murder of ten-year-old James Mitchell Porter, as well as the killing of an eight-year-old boy from Augusta, Georgia.

Downs was sentenced to death in South Carolina for murdering O'Mailia on June 27, 2002, after he pleaded guilty to the crime and personally requested to be executed. Downs, who was also convicted and sentenced to life without parole in Georgia for killing Porter, was executed by lethal injection on July 14, 2006, after he waived his appeals.

== Abduction and murder ==
On April 17, 1999, a six-year-old boy was kidnapped, raped and murdered near his home in North Augusta, South Carolina.

On that day, six-year-old Keenan Andre O'Mailia, who was a kindergartener at Hammond Hill Elementary School, was riding his bicycle at a park near his home while his mother was cooking dinner. While he was cycling, O'Mailia was stopped by 31-year-old William Ernest Downs Jr., who was a resident of Georgia and plumbing company employee married with a son. Downs reportedly asked O'Mailia his name, before he threw him to the ground. Downs also forcibly took the boy to the wooded area of the park, where he raped and strangled O'Mailia to death. After murdering the boy, Downs fled to Georgia.

The body of O'Mailia was found the next day after he was reported missing and the report prompted a search that led to the discovery of his body. An autopsy report by Dr Joel Sexton confirmed that O'Mailia died as a result of strangulation, and he had been raped before his death.

The murder of O'Mailia greatly shocked the community, and many parents were worried for the safety of their children. At O'Mailia's school, the American flag was flown at half-staff in mourning for the loss of O'Mailia.

== Arrest and charges ==
=== Arrest ===
After the discovery of Keenan O'Mailia's body, the police classified the case as murder and began their investigations. Nearby the crime scene, the police discovered a woman's bathing suit. The police also searched on the list of sexual offenders living in the area to identify possible suspects behind the murder of the boy.

On April 26, 1999, William Downs Jr., who was identified as a suspect, was arrested in Warner Robins, Georgia for the murder of O'Mailia, to which he confessed. Downs was also told to provide DNA samples for the purpose of investigating O'Mailia's death.

=== Downs's confession to other murders ===
Apart from his confession to the murder of O'Mailia, Downs additionally admitted his responsibility to at least two other murders.

Notably, one of the victims was ten-year-old James Mitchell Porter (March 20, 1980 – c. March 14, 1991). Porter, who resided in Augusta, Georgia, was reported missing on March 14, 1991, and his decomposing body was discovered two months later on May 17, 1991, in the Augusta Canal. The police initially ruled the death of Porter as accidental drowning, but eight years later, the case was reopened for investigations after Downs confessed that he kidnapped and raped Porter before he strangled the boy to death.

In response to the revelation that her son was murdered, Porter's mother stated that she was outraged and this truth only confirmed the suspicion that her son did not accidentally drown, and added that had the police investigated properly, O'Mailia would not have died. The Georgia police defended their report and explained that with the degree of decomposition, they could not find any signs of homicidal death. It was further revealed that Downs was acquainted with the Porters prior to the murder.

Apart from the killing of Porter, Downs also admitted that he killed an eight-year-old boy in Augusta sometime in 1991, likewise by rape and strangulation; the identity of the victim was never made public.

== Trials of William Downs Jr. ==
=== South Carolina ===
William Downs Jr.
- 1999 booking photo of William Downs Jr.
- Born: William Ernest Downs Jr. July 12, 1967; Augusta, Georgia, U.S.
- Died: July 14, 2006 (aged 39); Broad River Correctional Institution, South Carolina, U.S.
- Cause of death: Execution by lethal injection
- Status: Executed
- Convictions: South Carolina; Murder; Kidnapping; First-degree criminal sexual conduct with a minor Georgia; Murder; Kidnapping; Sodomy; Necrophilia
- Penalty: South Carolina; Death; Georgia; Two consecutive life sentences plus ten years

Details
- Victims: 2 confirmed, 3 total suspected
- Date: 1991 – 1999
- Country: United States
- Locations: Augusta, Georgia (1991); North Augusta, South Carolina (1999)
- Imprisoned at: Broad River Correctional Institution, South Carolina

William Downs Jr. was first tried in South Carolina for the murder of Keenan O'Mailia. The prosecution reportedly sought the death penalty.

On June 13, 2002, a week before Downs was supposed to stand trial for murdering O'Mailia, Downs pleaded guilty to the murder charge. As a result of this plea of guilt, it was up to the judge to determine if Downs should be given the death penalty or life imprisonment without the possibility of parole.

On June 27, 2002, during a sentencing hearing, Downs proclaimed that he deserved to die and requested a death sentence. At the end of the hearing, Circuit Judge Casey Manning sentenced Downs to death.

=== Georgia ===
A year after his death sentencing in South Carolina, Downs was sent back to Georgia to be charged and tried for the murder of James Porter. Despite his confession, Downs pleaded not guilty in July 2003 and claimed to be innocent in the case of Porter's killing. The Georgia prosecutors expressed their intent to seek the death penalty for Downs in spite of his prior death sentence in South Carolina.

On June 15, 2005, Downs was convicted of murder, kidnapping, sodomy, and necrophilia for the killing of Porter, after he reached a plea agreement with the prosecution, which allowed the death penalty to be taken off the table. As a result of the plea deal, Judge Carl C. Brown sentenced Downs to two consecutive life sentences without parole, plus ten years for the offenses he pleaded guilty to. The arrangement ensured that if Downs's South Carolina death sentence were overturned, he would remain in prison for the rest of his life until his death. The plea deal also stated that if he appealed the sentence or agreement, it would be revoked, and he could again face a possible death sentence in Georgia.

== Execution ==
After he was sentenced to death in South Carolina, Williams Downs Jr. chose not to appeal his death sentence. Despite so, Downs's death sentence still carried a mandatory automatic appeal to the South Carolina Supreme Court. On October 25, 2004, Downs's direct appeal was dismissed by the South Carolina Supreme Court, which upheld his conviction and sentence.

Two years later, a court hearing was carried out to determine if Downs was mentally competent to waive his remaining rights to appeal; Downs maintained that he would rather be executed than spend the rest of his life in prison. On May 30, 2006, the South Carolina Supreme Court ruled that Downs was mentally competent enough to forgo his appeals and be executed. With this decision, it was reported that Downs would soon receive his death warrant.

On June 16, 2006, the South Carolina Supreme Court signed a death warrant for Downs, scheduling his execution to be conducted on July 14, 2006.

Throughout the final month before his execution, Downs did not file any last-minute appeals against his execution. The South Carolina governor Mark Sanford stated that he would not commute Downs's death sentence after finding no grounds for leniency.

On July 14, 2006, 39-year-old William Ernest Downs Jr. was put to death by lethal injection at the Broad River Correctional Institution. Downs reportedly never said any final words before he was administered with the drugs, and ultimately pronounced dead at 6.17pm. For his last meal, Downs ordered salted cashew nuts, instant french roast coffee, chocolate chip cookie dough, moose tracks ice cream and three Mr. Goodbar candy bars.

Nina O'Mailia, the mother of Keenan O'Mailia, did not attend the execution. James Porter's mother, Kathy Porter, attended the execution but did not accept a request to speak to the media. Downs was the 36th person to be executed in South Carolina since the state's resumption of capital punishment in 1985.

== Aftermath ==
In the aftermath, Timothy "Tim" McNeill, the man who discovered the body of Keenan O'Mailia, set up the Keenan O'Mailia Candle of Hope Foundation, a charity foundation which he named after the victim. McNeill would die of a brain tumour in 2010. According to McNeill's widow, the tragic death of O'Mailia changed the life of her husband and prompted him to set up the foundation, which aimed to provide charity and community help, and both family and friends remembered Mc'Neill as a kind and loving person.

After losing her only son, O'Mailia's mother, who was a single parent at that time, moved back to Portland, Oregon where she joined a parental support group for parents of murdered children and saw a grief counsellor. O'Mailia's mother stated that she found peace after she chose to forgive Downs, and stated that the execution of her son's killer would not bring additional comfort to her.

In 2008, the Director of the North Augusta Department of Public Safety, T. Lee Wetherington, announced his retirement in 2009. It was noted that during his tenure, the police investigated the murder of Keenan O'Mailia as one of the worst cases which the department had ever encountered, and it was acknowledged that the department under Wetherington's leadership was able to crack these cases after their fullest efforts in investigation.

Downs was one of the few White people to be executed for murdering African-American victims since 1976. It was extremely rare for White people to be sentenced to death for killing African-American people in the United States; a 2014 study revealed that Downs was one of only 16 White defendants to be executed for the murder of African-American victims (some of whom had also killed victims of other races). The number had since increased to 33 by 2025.

== See also ==
- Capital punishment in South Carolina
- List of people executed in South Carolina
- List of people executed in the United States in 2006
- List of white defendants executed for killing a black victim

Executions carried out in South Carolina
| Preceded by Shawn Paul Humphries December 2, 2005 | William Downs Jr. July 14, 2006 | Succeeded by Calvin Shuler June 22, 2007 |
Executions carried out in the United States
| Preceded by Rocky Barton – Ohio July 12, 2006 | William Downs Jr. – South Carolina; July 14, 2006 | Succeeded by Mauriceo Brown – Texas July 19, 2006 |
