= Donald Henry Gaskins =

American serial killer (1933–1991)

- Mugshot of Gaskins
- Born: Donald Henry Parrott Jr. March 31, 1933; Florence County, South Carolina, U.S.
- Died: September 6, 1991 (aged 58); Broad River Correctional Institution, South Carolina, U.S.
- Other names: The Meanest Man in America; The Redneck Charles Manson; The Hitchhiker's Killer; Junior Parrott; Pee Wee
- Status: Executed by electrocution
- Convictions: Murder (10 counts); Involuntary manslaughter Assault; Robbery; Burglary
- Penalty: Death (1976 and 1983)

Details
- Victims: 15 confirmed (110 claimed)
- Span of crimes: 1953–1982
- Country: United States
- State: South Carolina
- Date apprehended: November 14, 1975

Donald Henry "Pee Wee" Gaskins Jr. (born Donald Henry Parrott Jr.; March 31, 1933 – September 6, 1991) was an American serial killer and rapist from South Carolina who stabbed, shot, drowned, and poisoned more than a dozen people. Before his convictions for murder, Gaskins had a long history of criminal activities resulting in prison sentences for assault, burglary, and statutory rape. His last arrest was for contributing to the delinquency of a minor, 13-year-old Kim Gehlken, who had gone missing in September 1975. During their search for the missing girl, police discovered eight bodies buried in shallow graves near Gaskins' home in Prospect, South Carolina.

In May 1976, a Florence County jury took only 47 minutes before finding Gaskins guilty for the murder of one of the eight victims, Dennis Bellamy, and sentenced him to death by the electric chair. That death sentence was overturned by the South Carolina Supreme Court in February 1978, and rather than face a new trial, Gaskins pleaded guilty to the murders of Bellamy and eight other friends and associates, as well as a burglary charge. He was given 10 concurrent life sentences, to be served at Central Correctional Institution (CCI) prison in Columbia, South Carolina.

While at CCI, Gaskins murdered Rudolph Tyner, a fellow inmate on death row, using C4 explosive. After his conviction for killing Tyner, he received his second death sentence, which was administered in September 1991. Just before his execution Gaskins said he killed 110 people but, with few exceptions, these statements have been discredited by law enforcement and journalists who allege this was his attempt to gain notoriety. In his sworn testimony as part of a plea agreement to avoid trial for the murder of John Henry Knight, Gaskins was confirmed to have killed thirteen people between 1970 and 1975. Of the fifteen people total that he murdered during his lifetime, ten were under age 25, six were teenagers and one was only two years old.

== Early life ==
Donald Henry Gaskins was born in Florence County, South Carolina, to Eulea Parrott. He was the last in a string of Parrott's children, all of whom were born out of wedlock. Gaskins was small for his age and immediately gained the nickname "Pee Wee." As an adult, he was between 5 ft 4 in (1.63 m) and 5 ft 5 in (1.65 m) and weighed approximately 130 lb (59 kg).

Gaskins's early life was characterized by a great deal of neglect from his mother and abuse by a male relative. His mother apparently took so little interest in him that the first time he learned his given name—Donald—was when it was read out in his first court appearance. Gaskins was often described as a great manipulator and con artist who was "street smart" and had "a keen sense of humor and a friendly, entertaining personality."

When he was one year old, Gaskins reportedly drank a bottle of kerosene which caused him to have convulsions until age 3. In adolescence, Gaskins engaged in a violent crime spree with a group of fellow delinquents which included burglaries, assaults, and a gang rape. At age 13, Gaskins was convicted of assaulting a young woman by hitting her in the head with an axe when she caught him breaking into her family home. He was sentenced to five years in a reform school, the South Carolina Industrial School for White Boys in Florence, where he was regularly raped by his fellow inmates.

After escaping from the reform school, getting married and voluntarily returning to complete his sentence, Gaskins was released in 1951 at the age of 18. He briefly worked on a tobacco plantation until he was arrested in 1953 for attacking a teenage girl with a hammer over an alleged insult. He was sentenced to six years' imprisonment at the South Carolina Penitentiary. There, Gaskins earned his fellow inmates' respect by killing the most feared man in the prison, Hazel Brazell, in what Gaskins claimed was self-defense. As a result, Gaskins received an extra three years in prison for involuntary manslaughter. He escaped from prison in 1955 by hiding in the back of a garbage truck and fled to Florida, where he took employment with a traveling carnival. He was re-arrested, remanded to custody, and paroled in August 1961.

Following his release from prison, Gaskins reverted to committing burglaries and fencing stolen property. Two years after his parole, he was arrested for the rape of a twelve-year-old girl, but absconded while awaiting sentence. Gaskins was rearrested in Georgia and sentenced to eight years of imprisonment. He was paroled again in November 1968. Upon his release, Gaskins moved to the town of Sumter, South Carolina, and began work with a roofing company.

== Murders ==
Gaskins said his first non-prison-related murder victim was a blonde female hitchhiker whom he tortured and murdered in September 1969 before sinking her body in a swamp. In his memoirs, he said: "All I could think about is how I could do anything I wanted to her." This hitchhiker was to be the first of many he said he picked up and killed while driving around the coastal highways of the American South. Gaskins classified these victims as "coastal kills": people, both men and women, whom he killed purely for pleasure, on average once every six weeks, when he went hunting to quell his feelings of "bothersome-ness". He said he tortured and mutilated his victims while attempting to keep them alive for as long as possible. He confessed to killing these victims using a variety of methods including stabbing, suffocation, and mutilation, and even said he cannibalized some of them.

Gaskins later confessed to killing "eighty to ninety" such victims, although his statements to have committed any "coastal kills" have never been corroborated. In his memoirs, Gaskins said he committed coastal kills every six weeks, yet he contradicts this statement later in the book by stating he felt the overpowering need to seek out and commit a coastal kill by the tenth day of each calendar month. He also specifically named three further individuals whom he classified among his "serious murders": an African-American couple he named as "Eddie and Bertie Brown" (aged 24 and 20 respectively) that he murdered in 1972 and buried "behind the Tenant House" (a location Gaskins failed to precisely pinpoint in his autobiography beyond once stating was a "shortcut to go around Columbia"), and a man named Horace Jones (40), who he said was murdered in 1974.

There is no evidence to support any of the statements made by Gaskins that he had committed any murders other than that of Hazel Brazell and the fourteen victims listed below, whose bodies have been found and identified, and whose law enforcement records and Gaskins's sworn testimony substantiate.

=== 1970 ===
In November 1970, Gaskins committed the first of a series of confirmed murders, primarily people whom he knew and killed for personal reasons. His first confirmed victims were his own niece, Janice Kirby (aged 15), and her friend, Patricia Ann Alsbrook (aged 17), both of whom he beat to death. He said he was enraged at their drug abuse, while others say he was attempting to sexually assault them in Sumter.

=== 1971 or 1972 ===
Gaskins claims to have poisoned Martha Ann Dicks Jr. (also known as "Clyde"), 20, in March 1971 or 1972, because of a rumor Gaskins was the father of her unborn child, because she was an alleged drug dealer who had supplied Kirby and Allsbrook, and/or because she got married and left for Texas to be with her husband. Dicks' bones were found in a ditch, but lost when given to a university to study. The box containing her remains was recovered on June 13, 2025, from a closet at the College of Charleston campus.

=== 1973 ===
Gaskins raped and drowned Doreen Hope Dempsey, 22, and her two-year-old daughter Robin Michelle Dempsey in June 1973. Gaskins had befriended Doreen Dempsey several years prior and became angry upon hearing she had become pregnant a second time by an African American man. She had been living with Gaskins's friend Johnny Sellers and his brother Carl Sellers in North Charleston, South Carolina. They brought her to Gaskins's home in Prospect, and left her there to speak with Gaskins about staying with him for a short time while she was pregnant. Upset that Doreen was having a second biracial child, Gaskins responded by walking her to his backyard pond where he drowned both the mother and her toddler.

=== 1974 ===
In June 1974, Gaskins shot his friend and criminal associate Johnny Sellers, age 36, in the back of the head, and stabbed to death Johnny's ex-girlfriend Jessie Ruth Judy, age 22, after Sellers asked for money he was owed from the sale of a stolen boat. Gaskins feared Sellers would reveal Gaskins's involvement in the boat theft and sale. Gaskins was also involved in an auto theft ring. Jessie Judy was murdered at the same time because she could have told police about Gaskins's criminal activities, including murdering her boyfriend, Johnny Sellers.

=== 1975 ===
Silas Barnwell Yates, age 45, was murdered in February 1975 by having his throat slit in a murder-for-hire scheme. The forensics showed it was by knife, but Gaskins disputed this, saying it was done by karate chop. Yates was in a dispute with his ex-girlfriend Suzanne Kipper Owens, and she and her husband John Owens paid Gaskins $1,500 to murder Yates.

Dianne Bellamy Neeley, age 25, was separated from her husband Walter Neeley, who was one of Gaskins's closest friends and a criminal co-conspirator. On April 10, 1975, Gaskins stabbed to death Dianne Bellamy and shot dead her boyfriend Avery Leroy Howard, age 34. Among other reasons, Gaskins murdered Dianne Bellamy because she had threatened to report to police that Gaskins was allowing underage teenagers to have sex in his home. Avery Howard was murdered because he asked for money to pay attorneys and cover legal expenses following his arrest for fraud and auto theft. Gaskins worried Avery Howard would tell police about Gaskins's criminal activities.

Kim Gehlken, age 13, was stabbed to death to keep her from telling police Gaskins had moved her from North Charleston without permission, and to keep her from telling police she was being sexually abused by several adult men, including Gaskins.

Dennis Bellamy, age 28, and John Henry Knight, age 15, were half-brothers, and Dianne Bellamy was their sister. Within minutes of each other, Gaskins shot the two brothers in the back of the head on October 10, 1975. Gaskins had promised to pay Dennis Bellamy for some stolen guns. When confronted by Bellamy at Gaskins's trailer home in Prospect, South Carolina, he responded by offering to return the guns from the woods behind his home. He took Bellamy into the woods to retrieve the guns, but murdered him instead. John Henry Knight was directed to the same area, allegedly to meet his brother, but was also murdered to ensure he could never speak of the crimes.

=== 1982 ===
Rudolph Tyner, age 23, was on death row in CCI prison for a March 1978 double-murder when he was murdered by Gaskins on September 12, 1982. Tyner was appealing his own death sentence after being convicted of robbing a Murrells Inlet convenience store and killing store owners Bill and Myrtle Moon on March 18, 1978. The Moons' son, Tony Cimo, hired Gaskins for $2,000 to kill Rudolph Tyner because in Cimo's view, the appeals process was taking too long. Tony Cimo asked Gaskins what he needed to kill Tyner, then Gaskins told him to insert some C4 inside the heel of a shoe and mail it to him. This way Gaskins obtained plastic explosives with a blasting cap, a long wire, and a radio speaker to create an imitation intercom speaker that Tyner put to his ear to test. Gaskins then detonated the makeshift bomb by plugging the wire into a prison cell power outlet.

David Bruck, chief lawyer of the South Carolina Office of Appellate Defense, described the murder of Tyner as a "high tech lynching."

== Final arrest ==
Gaskins was arrested on November 14, 1975, when a criminal associate named Walter Neeley confessed to police that he had knowledge of Gaskins killing Dennis Bellamy, age 28, and Johnny Knight, age 15. Neeley confessed to police that Gaskins had confided in him that he had killed several people listed as missing during the previous five years and had indicated to him where they were buried. On December 4, 1975, Neeley led police to land near Gaskins's home in Prospect, where police discovered the bodies of eight of his victims.

== Imprisonment and execution ==
Gaskins was tried on one charge of murder on May 24, 1976, found guilty on May 28, and sentenced to death, which was later commuted to life in prison when the South Carolina General Assembly's 1974 ruling on capital punishment was changed to conform to the U.S. Supreme Court guidelines for the death penalty in other states.

On September 2, 1982, Gaskins committed another murder, for which he earned the title of "The Meanest Man in America". While incarcerated in the high-security block of the South Carolina Correctional Institution, Gaskins killed a death row inmate named Rudolph Tyner, who had received his sentence for killing an elderly couple during a botched armed robbery of their store in Murrells Inlet, South Carolina. Gaskins was hired to commit this murder by Tony Cimo, the son of Tyner's victims. Cimo was initially charged with murder, but pleaded guilty to lesser charges of conspiracy to commit murder, concealing information from the authorities, and threatening to kill by means of explosives and was sentenced to eight years in prison. Cimo began his sentence on June 24, 1983. He was denied parole in 1985, but was released on parole on March 24, 1986.

Gaskins initially made several unsuccessful attempts to kill Tyner by lacing his food and drink with poison before he opted to use explosives to kill him. To accomplish this, Gaskins rigged a device similar to a portable radio in Tyner's cell and told Tyner this would allow them to "communicate between cells". When Tyner followed Gaskins's instructions to hold a speaker (laden with C-4 plastic explosive, unbeknownst to him) to his ear at an agreed time, Gaskins detonated the explosives from his cell and killed Tyner. He later said, "The last thing he [Tyner] heard was me laughing."

Gaskins was tried for Tyner's murder, convicted and sentenced to death. His execution was the first time in 111 years in South Carolina that a white defendant was executed for the murder of a black victim: the previous time a white defendant was executed for the murder of a black victim in South Carolina was in 1880, when Thomas White was hanged for murdering Pete Hawkins outside a bar. Further to this, it was the first time in 47 years in the United States that a white defendant was executed for the murder of a black victim: the previous execution of a white defendant for the murder of a black victim had been in 1944, when Fred Brady was hanged in Kansas for murdering Joe Williams during an attempted robbery.

While on death row, Gaskins confessed to between 100 and 110 murders. Among them was Margaret "Peg" Cuttino, the 13-year-old daughter of then South Carolina State Senator James Cuttino Jr. of Sumter – a killing for which the serial killer William Pierce had already been convicted. These murders have been widely disputed, and there has been no evidence to support Gaskins' statements.

Gaskins was executed on September 6, 1991, at 1:10 a.m. in the electric chair, hours after he had tried to kill himself by slitting his wrists. His last words were: "I'll let my lawyers talk for me. I'm ready to go."

== In popular culture ==
The 1986 CBS made-for-television movie Vengeance: The Story of Tony Cimo was based on Gaskins' (Brad Dourif) 1982 murder of Rudolph Tyner (Michael Beach) from the perspective of Cimo (Brad Davis) that led to Gaskins' 1991 execution. The South Carolina Department of Corrections did not allow Gaskins' personality rights to be used by producers, as he was appealing his death sentence at the time of production.

In 2025, the biographical crime drama Gaskins: The Hitchhiker Killer depicted Gaskins's crimes from the 1960s through the 1980s. The film was directed by Chris Helton, with Taylor Stiles portraying Gaskins, and was distributed internationally by Blacktop International.

In December 2025, attorney and former South Carolina solicitor Dick Harpootlian published Dig Me a Grave: The Inside Story of the Serial Killer Who Seduced the South, a non-fiction account of Gaskins' life and prosecution.

== See also ==
- Eric Edgar Cooke, an Australian serial killer with similarly varied murder weapons and victims.
- Capital punishment in South Carolina
- Capital punishment in the United States
- List of people executed in South Carolina
- List of people executed in the United States in 1991
- List of people executed by electrocution
- List of serial killers by number of victims
- List of serial killers in the United States
- List of white defendants executed for killing a black victim
- Race and capital punishment in the United States
