= Murder of Betty Gardner =

1978 hate crime in South Carolina, US

Betty Gardner
- Born: Betty Jean Atkins Gardner c. 1945; Frogmore, South Carolina, U.S.
- Died: April 12, 1978 (aged 33); St. Helena Island, South Carolina, U.S.
- Cause of death: Murder by stabbing and a blow to the head
- Occupation: Farmworker
- Known for: Victim of a hate crime and anti-black racism
- Children: 2

On April 12, 1978, Betty Gardner, a 33-year-old black woman, was sexually assaulted, tortured, and murdered by four white people during a racially motivated hate crime in St. Helena Island, South Carolina, United States. Gardner had been hitchhiking when she was picked up by John Arnold, John Plath, Cindy Sheets, and Carol Ullman. After dropping Gardner off, Arnold suggested to the group that they kill her. Gardner was then sexually assaulted, strangled, beaten, and stabbed to death. After the murder, Arnold carved the letters "KKK" into her body.

All of the perpetrators were captured at a later date. Ullman, who was 11 years old at the time of the murder, was never prosecuted due to her age. Sheets spent nearly a year in jail, but was granted immunity after she turned state's evidence and, along with Ullman, testified against Arnold and Plath. Both men were convicted and sentenced to death. They were executed by lethal injection in 1998, a few months apart. The case was notable as it marked a rare occasion in which two white people were executed for murdering a single black victim.

== People involved ==
=== Betty Gardner ===
Betty Jean Atkins Gardner, a black American woman, was from Frogmore, South Carolina and was a single mother of two. She was a farmworker who picked tomatoes on her father's land on St. Helena Island.

=== John Arnold and John Plath ===
John Herman Plath

John David "Butch" Arnold Jr. (1955 – March 6, 1998) and John Herman Plath (December 8, 1954 – July 10, 1998), two white American men, were first cousins from York, Pennsylvania. Both had lengthy rap sheets for prior offenses. Prior to Gardner's murder, Arnold had been arrested nineteen times, while Plath had been arrested eleven times. Arnold had been arrested for assault, burglary, false imprisonment, and parole violations. Plath had been arrested for attempted robbery, auto theft, harassment by communication, receiving stolen goods, and theft. Both men had also been involved in unrelated shootings in separate cases, in which they were both charged, however, the charges were later dropped. Arnold was accused of shooting a former girlfriend with a rifle, but the charge was dropped when she refused to testify against him. Plath was charged in the 1973 fatal shooting of his friend, 18-year-old Frank Winchnarz. While police suspected that Winchnarz's death was intentional, there was only enough evidence for an involuntary manslaughter charge. The charge was later dismissed entirely due to insufficient evidence.

== Murder ==
On April 12, 1978, Gardner was hitchhiking near Beaufort, South Carolina, heading to St. Helena Island to work on her father's farm. As she waited for a ride, a green Pontiac with South Carolina plates stopped by the side of the road. Inside the vehicle was John Arnold, John Plath, Cindy Sheets, and Carol Ullman. Sheets was Plath's 17-year-old girlfriend and Ullman was an 11-year-old runaway; Arnold was later charged with her statutory rape. Also in the vehicle were two dogs. The group was heading to the beach and had been staying with a United States Marine and his wife. The vehicle they were driving belonged to the couple. Gardner accepted the group's offer of a ride and headed off with them. Unbeknownst to her, Arnold was on the run and was wanted on escape charges for failing to return from a weekend furlough from a pre-release facility at State Correctional Institution – Huntingdon in Pennsylvania. A short time later, Gardner was dropped off at the end of a dirt lane. After she left the vehicle, Arnold suggested to the group that they kill her. When asked why, his response was simply, "Because I hate niggers." The group then returned to Gardner and picked her up again, offering to drop her off nearer to her location.

As Gardner sat in the vehicle, Sheets began attacking her and struck her repeatedly with her fist. Gardner was then driven to a remote area in some woods in St. Helena Island. Once there, Arnold and Plath ordered her to strip naked. Arnold then told Gardner that she would not be going anywhere, before kicking her in the side. Arnold and Plath then both repeatedly attacked her, with the pair threatening to kill her if she refused to comply with their demands. Gardner was then forced to engage in oral sex with Arnold, Plath, and Sheets. Gardner was whipped repeatedly with a belt, which was then wrapped around her neck. Arnold and Plath tried strangling Gardner to death with the belt, as she was dragged along the ground. Plath stomped on her neck several times and stabbed her repeatedly in the chest with a pocketknife. Meanwhile, Arnold tore up some clothing and made a rope, intending to hang Gardner from a nearby tree. However, he changed his mind, believing the makeshift rope would not support her weight. Plath then ordered Sheets to cut Gardner's throat with a broken soda bottle. When that failed, Arnold, with the help of Carol Ullman, strangled Gardner some more, before she eventually died.

Sheets later claimed that she had been pressured into participating in the murder. She testified that Plath had told her, "If you ever open your mouth about what's going to happen, I'm going to get you. If I don't get you, I'll get your family."

== Aftermath ==
After the murder, Arnold carved the letters "KKK" into Gardner's body, supposedly to mislead investigators. Members of the group also urinated and defecated on her corpse. After the group left the area, they split up. Arnold and Ullman remained in Beaufort, while Plath and Sheets returned to their native city of York, Pennsylvania. When Gardner failed to show up at work, her family filed a missing person's report. The last person to see her alive, other than those in the car, was her brother, who had seen her get into the green Pontiac near his home when she was hitchhiking. Gardner's sister was left to raise her children.

No leads came in the case for over a month, until a detective from the Beaufort County Sheriff's Office spotted the Pontiac by chance. The owners of the car, the United States Marine and his wife, told the detective that Arnold and Plath had borrowed the vehicle. Arnold and Ullman were then quickly arrested in Beaufort. Plath and Sheets were captured back in York by police, who caught Plath hiding under the porch of his mother's home.

Lawyers for Sheets negotiated her immunity in exchange for testifying against Arnold and Plath, as well as cooperating with South Carolina investigators. When she was returned to Beaufort, she led police to Gardner's body, which by now was badly decomposed. The body was not found until nearly eleven weeks after Gardner's murder. Dental records confirmed her identity.

Arnold and Plath were placed in the Beaufort County Jail, where they were described as problematic inmates. During their time in this jail, they attempted to escape twice and constructed a fake gun. As a result, the sheriff personally asked the governor to move both inmates to a state penitentiary in Columbia. Both men proclaimed their innocence in the crime.

== Trials ==
In February 1979, Arnold and Plath were tried for the murder of Gardner in Beaufort County. State prosecutors announced they intended to seek the death penalty against both Arnold and Plath. The veteran prosecutor, Randolph Murdaugh Jr., called the crime, "the most terrible, inhuman, degrading and nauseating case" he had ever seen. Sheets and Ullman testified against Arnold and Plath, with their stories about the events of the crime being almost identical. Ullman testified that Arnold said he hated black people. A forensic pathologist determined the cause of death was stabbing and a blow to the head. Due to the decomposition of the body at the time of its discovery, further conclusions could not be established, and strangulation could not be ruled out as a possible cause of death.

On February 5, the jury, consisting of six men and six women, two of whom were black, found both men guilty of the murder. On February 9, both men were sentenced to death. Arnold reacted to the sentence without any emotion, while Plath slammed a pencil into a table. Afterwards, Plath said he had been "falsely accused" and was a "victim of prejudice." Arnold was also charged with the statutory rape of Ullman. Following the verdict, Arnold began the first of two hunger strikes in an attempt to speed up his execution. He wrote a letter to the South Carolina Supreme Court, asking to drop all of his appeals, albeit he would later change his mind. Both men continued to proclaim their innocence in the crime and argued that Sheets was the actual killer. Sheets was released one month after the sentencing of Arnold and Plath; she returned to York. Ullman was never prosecuted due to her age.

In October 1981, the South Carolina Supreme Court upheld the convictions of Arnold and Plath, but remanded the case for resentencing. It ruled that Murdaugh had erred when he told the jury that he would never seek another death sentence for anyone if Arnold and Plath were not executed. In May 1982, both men were resentenced to death. Plath appeared shocked by the verdict, while Arnold grinned. At Arnold's resentencing hearing, Murdaugh had pointed to him and reminded the jurors that he had snickered at several points during the trial.

"It's a joke to him. He doesn't think y'all have got the guts to kill him."

== Executions ==
On March 6, 1998, Arnold, 42, was executed via lethal injection at Broad River Correctional Institution in Columbia. He was pronounced dead at 6:15 p.m. Arnold proclaimed his innocence to the very end and issued a final statement saying, "The judicial system has had my neck under its heel. I leave this world with my identity fully intact, my dignity untouched, my spirit sound and whole." He was buried in Pennsylvania by his aunt.

On July 10, 1998, Plath, 43, was also executed via lethal injection at Broad River Correctional Institution. He was pronounced dead at 6:22 p.m. In his final handwritten statement, he denied killing Gardner. Plath became a Christian while in prison and quoted Bible verses in the execution chamber. While on death row, Plath was adopted by a 70-year-old woman. He also received a religious letter from convicted murderer and Manson Family member Tex Watson.

Following Plath's execution, the family of Gardner released a statement saying, "This murder has left a void in our lives that we will never fill... Now with the death of Betty's murderers, we can continue to move forward."

At the time of Arnold's execution, The Herald pointed out that since 1976, when the death penalty was restored, 113 black defendants had been executed for murdering a white victim, compared to just 6 white defendants for murdering a black victim. After Arnold's execution, the executive director of the American Civil Liberties Union for South Carolina, Steve Bates, commented on the disparity in executions by the race of defendants and victims, as well as his belief in racism in the judicial system. Bates stated that Arnold's execution was an exception to the rule.

== See also ==
- Capital punishment in South Carolina
- Capital punishment in the United States
- Hate crime laws in the United States
- List of lynching victims in the United States
- List of people executed by lethal injection
- List of people executed in South Carolina
- List of people executed in the United States in 1998
- List of white defendants executed for killing a black victim
- Lynching in the United States
- Race and capital punishment in the United States
- Racism against Black Americans
