= Brandon Hedrick =

American murderer (1979–2006)

- Born: Brandon Wayne Hedrick; February 23, 1979; U.S.
- Died: July 20, 2006 (aged 27); Greensville Correctional Center, Jarratt, Virginia, U.S.
- Cause of death: Execution by electrocution
- Convictions: Capital murder Rape; Forcible sodomy
- Penalty: Death (July 22, 1998)

Details
- Victims: Lisa Yvonne Crider, 23
- Date: May 10, 1997
- Country: United States
- State: Virginia
- Date apprehended: c. May 17, 1997

Brandon Wayne Hedrick (February 23, 1979 – July 20, 2006) was an American convicted murderer who was executed by the state of Virginia in the electric chair for the 1997 murder of 23-year-old Lisa Crider, who was kidnapped, robbed, raped, and shot in the face. He was the first person electrocuted in Virginia since 2003, when Earl Bramblett was executed for the murder of four members of the Hodges family in 1994.

== Murder ==
On May 10, 1997, Hedrick and Trevor Jones spent the evening drinking, smoking crack cocaine and marijuana, and employing the services of four prostitutes. After driving the last two prostitutes back to downtown Lynchburg, Virginia, Hedrick and Jones saw Lisa Yvonne Crider. Jones knew that Crider's boyfriend was a crack cocaine dealer, and the two decided to pick Crider up, have sex with her, and rob her of any crack in her possession. Crider voluntarily traveled with Hedrick and Jones back to Jones's apartment, where Jones paid Crider $50 to have sex with him. Afterward, Hedrick retrieved a shotgun from Jones's car at Jones's direction and robbed Crider of the $50 at gunpoint. Hedrick and Jones handcuffed Crider, duct-taped her eyes and mouth, and led her to Jones's truck. The three left the apartment around 1:00 a.m.

After driving for some time, Jones stopped the truck because Hedrick wanted to have sex with Crider. Hedrick raped Crider after telling her not to "try anything" because he had a gun. Afterward, the two men decided to kill Crider, fearing retaliation from her boyfriend.

They continued driving until daybreak when Jones stopped the truck near the James River. Jones led Crider to the riverbank, told Hedrick to "do what you got to do," and walked back to the truck. Hedrick shot Crider and left with Jones. The two men fled Virginia in Jones' truck the next day. That evening, Crider's body was discovered at the James River with a shotgun wound to the face. About one week later, the authorities arrested Hedrick and Jones in Lincoln, Nebraska.

== Trial and appeals ==
Hedrick was convicted of capital murder in the commission of robbery, rape, forcible sodomy, abduction, and use of a firearm in the commission of murder. During the sentencing phase of his trial, a court-appointed clinical psychologist testified that Hedrick was significantly immature for his age and that he had a problem with drugs and alcohol that accelerated in the months leading up to the crimes. He noted Hedrick's IQ score of 76, which was "far below average," although "not so low as to suggest mental retardation." The jury recommended that he be sentenced to death, finding that Hedrick posed a "continuing serious threat to society" and that his conduct in committing the offenses was "outrageously or wantonly vile, horrible or inhuman in that it involved torture, depravity of mind, aggravated battery to the victim beyond the minimum necessary to accomplish the act of murder." The Circuit Court agreed and sentenced Hedrick to death on July 22, 1998.

In 2001, a judge ruled that Hedrick had received adequate legal representation during his original trial and declared that Hedrick would not be given a new trial. In 2002, a judge ordered a mental competency evaluation for Hedrick after he claimed he wanted to drop his appeals. Hedrick repeatedly changed his mind on the matter.

Hedrick's accomplice, Trevor Jones, was sentenced to life in prison.

== Execution ==
Under Virginia law since January 1, 1995, condemned prisoners have been able to choose between the electric chair and lethal injection as their execution method. Hedrick's lawyers indicated that he chose the electric chair because he feared complications related to the drugs used in the lethal injection. After Governor Tim Kaine declined to intervene, Hedrick's execution proceeded.

On July 20, 2006, Hedrick was executed in the electric chair at the Greensville Correctional Center in Jarratt, Virginia. He was pronounced dead at 9:12 p.m. His last meal was pizza with cheese, sausage and hamburger, french fries with ketchup, bacon, chocolate cake, and apple pie. In his final statement, he said, "I pray for everybody that believes in Jesus Christ in heaven, and I pray for the people that are unsaved that they will accept Christ because they know not what they do and will accept Christ one day. I'm ready to go and be free."

== See also ==
- Capital punishment in Virginia
- Capital punishment in the United States
- List of people executed in Virginia
- List of people executed in the United States in 2006
- List of white defendants executed for killing a black victim
- Race and capital punishment in the United States
