= Robert Anderson (murderer) =

Executed American child murderer (1966–2006)

- Born: Robert James Anderson; May 29, 1966; Great Lakes, Illinois, U.S.
- Died: July 20, 2006 (aged 40); Huntsville Unit, Huntsville, Texas, U.S.
- Cause of death: Execution by lethal injection
- Known for: Sexual abusing and murdering a five-year-old girl

Robert James Anderson (May 29, 1966 – July 20, 2006) was an American criminal convicted and executed for the sexual abuse and murder of a five-year-old girl.

== Crimes ==
Anderson kidnapped and murdered five-year-old Audra Ann Reeves, in Amarillo, Texas on June 9, 1992. Anderson told police that he kidnapped Reeves as she was returning home from playing in a park. He then took her into his house and attempted to rape her. He beat, stabbed, and drowned Reeves, then stored her body in a styrofoam ice chest which he rolled to a dumpster. Her body was found later that day by a neighbor throwing out trash. Anderson was identified as the person who discarded the chest, apprehended by police, and confessed almost immediately.

Anderson said he committed the crime after a dispute with his wife of eight months. The Associated Press quoted Anderson as saying, "The whole day revolved around the fight. She stormed out of the house and said when she returned she didn't want to find me."

At his trial, Anderson requested to the presiding judge, Clinton Averitte, saying "Sir, this may sound callous ... I don't want to hurt anybody any longer, and I want to be executed."

== Execution ==
Anderson was sentenced to death and was executed by lethal injection in Texas on July 20, 2006, at the Huntsville Unit. He is buried at Captain Joe Byrd Cemetery.

== See also ==
- Capital punishment in Texas
- Capital punishment in the United States
- List of people executed in Texas, 2000–2009
- List of people executed in the United States in 2006
