= Broad River Correctional Institution =

State prison in South Carolina, US

- Interactive map of Broad River Correctional Institution
- Location: 4460 Broad River Road Columbia, South Carolina; 34°04′27″N 81°05′52″W
- Opened: 1988
- Managed by: South Carolina Department of Corrections
- Warden: Michael Stephan

The Broad River Correctional Institution (BRCI) is a South Carolina Department of Corrections state prison for men located in Columbia, South Carolina, United States. South Carolina's execution chamber is located at Broad River. The adjacent Kirkland Correctional Institution lies just to its south side.

The prison opened in 1988. In January 1990, death row inmates were moved from the Central Correctional Institution to Broad River. In 1990, executions began at BRCI. On April 12, 1997, death row inmates were moved to the Lieber Correctional Institution. In September 2017, death row inmates were moved to Kirkland Correctional Institution. On July 11, 2019, death row inmates were moved from Kirkland Correctional Institution to the housing unit that was originally built for them at Broad River.

== Notable inmates ==
=== Death row ===
- Bayan Aleksey - convicted of murdering Sergeant Franklin Lingard of the South Carolina Highway Patrol on December 31, 1997.
- Steven Bixby – perpetrator of the 2003 standoff in Abbeville, South Carolina.
- Tyree Roberts – convicted of murdering two police officers in 2002.
- James William Wilson Jr. – perpetrator of the 1988 Oakland Elementary School shooting

==== Executed ====
- John Arnold – executed on March 6, 1998, for the racially motivated murder of Betty Gardner
- Joseph Ernest Atkins – executed on January 23, 1999, for the murders of Karen Patterson and Benjamin F. Atkins
- Larry Gene Bell – executed on October 4, 1996, for the murders of Sharon Faye Smith and Debra Helmick
- Marion Bowman Jr. – executed on January 31, 2025, for the 2001 murder of Kandee Martin
- William Ernest Downs Jr. – executed on July 14, 2006, for the 1999 rape and murder of Keenan O'Mailia.
- Joseph Gardner – executed on December 5, 2008, for the murder of Melissa McLauchlin
- Donald Henry Gaskins – executed on September 6, 1991, for the murder of Rudolph Tyner, a fellow inmate on death row
- Shawn Paul Humphries – executed on December 2, 2005, for the murder of Dickie Smith
- Richard Charles Johnson – executed on May 3, 2002, for the murder of Bruce Smalls, a South Carolina police trooper
- Richard Longworth – executed on April 15, 2005, for the murders of Alex Hopps and James Green
- Mikal Mahdi – executed on April 11, 2025, the 2004 murder of off-duty police officer James Myers
- Richard Bernard Moore – executed on November 1, 2024, for the murder of convenience store clerk James Mahoney in 1999
- Freddie Eugene Owens – executed on September 20, 2024, for the murder of convenience store clerk Irene Grainger Graves in 1997
- John Plath – executed on July 10, 1998, for the racially motivated murder of Betty Gardner
- James Earl Reed – executed on June 20, 2008, for the murders of Barbara and Joseph Lafayette
- David Rocheville – executed on December 3, 1999, for the murders of Alex Hopps and James Green
- Brad Sigmon – executed by firing squad on March 7, 2025, after being convicted of the 2001 murders of his ex-girlfriend's parents David and Gladys Larke
- Stephen Stanko – executed on June 13, 2025, for murdering two people.
- Michael Torrence – executed on September 6, 1996, for the murders of Dennis Lollis, Charles Bush and Cynthia Williams
- James Neil Tucker – executed on May 28, 2004, for the murders of Rosa Lee Dolly Oakley and Shannon Mellon
- Hastings Arthur Wise – executed on November 4, 2005, for the murders of Charles Griffeth, David Moore, Leonard Filyaw and Sheryl Wood
- Ronald Woomer – executed on April 27, 1990, for the 1979 kidnapping, rape and murder of Della Louise Sellers. Woomer was the first to be executed in the Broad River Correctional Institution after it first opened in 1988.
- J. D. Gleaton and Larry Gilbert, two half-brothers who were executed on December 4, 1998, for the 1977 murder of Ralph Stoudemire
- Stephen Corey Bryant, convicted spree killer, who was executed on November 14, 2025.

=== Non-death row ===
- Quincy Allen – serial killer who murdered four people. Originally sentenced to death, before the sentence was commuted to life without parole
- Todd Kohlhepp – serial killer, mass murderer and rapist who pled guilty to 7 murders, 2 kidnappings and 1 sexual assault in 2017. Sentenced to life without parole.
- Conrad Slocumb — habitual offender. Shot an Orangeburg teacher five times in 1992, and sentenced to 30 years for criminal sexual conduct. Escaped Department of Juvenile Justice vehicle and committed escape, strong armed robbery, kidnapping, and a second criminal sexual conduct crime. Sentenced to life in prison without parole, sentence commuted to 130 years after Graham v. Florida. Slocumb contends his 130-year prison sentence violates the Eighth Amendment after the Graham case.

== See also ==
- List of South Carolina state prisons
