= 1988 Oakland Elementary School shooting =

Mass shooting in Greenwood, South Carolina

- Location: 34.2269°N 82.1408°W; Greenwood, South Carolina, U.S.
- Date: September 26, 1988; 38 years ago 11:30 a.m.
- Attack type: Mass shooting, school shooting, pedicide
- Weapon: 9-shot .22-caliber revolver
- Deaths: 2
- Injuries: 9
- Perpetrator: James William Wilson

The Oakland Elementary School shooting was a school shooting in 1988 in Greenwood, South Carolina, United States, in which 19-year-old James William Wilson Jr. shot and killed two students and wounded seven other students, a teacher, and a gym coach at Oakland Elementary School. He shot people in the cafeteria and in a classroom. Wilson had a history of mental illness.

== Shooting ==
On the morning of September 26, 1988, Wilson drove to his maternal grandmother's house and stole her .22 caliber, nine-shot revolver. He then drove to an Abbeville discount store and purchased some .22 hollow-point long rifle ammunition. Wilson discarded the bullets already loaded in the gun and reloaded the weapon with the more destructive hollow-point bullets. He next proceeded to the Oakland Elementary School in Greenwood, where he parked his 1974 Maverick. He entered the school, finding his way to the cafeteria, where he stood quietly for a moment. It was right at lunch time for many of the children. Next, Wilson pulled out the pistol and began shooting, picking his victims, both children and adults, at random. Witnesses observed a look of hatred and rage masking Wilson's face. He wounded three students and a first-grade teacher. Survivors were evacuated from the cafeteria by teachers and staff, and towards a wooded area; others hid in the cafeteria's freezer before moving toward the woods. Some sought shelter in a neighboring home. He left the cafeteria and entered a girls’ restroom to reload. He was confronted by physical education teacher Kat Finkbeiner, who accosted him and tried to stop him in the restroom; he shot her twice, wounding her. He then entered a third-grade classroom. Finkbeiner entered the room and tried to force him to surrender but he kept firing. He shot at the third-grade teacher, missing and hitting the blackboard. Wilson turned toward the students and opened fire, killing Shequila Bradley, who died at the scene, and Tequila Thomas, who died three days later, both eight years old, and wounding five students. Once the gun was empty, he dropped the gun and followed students as they evacuated the building.

When the police arrived, principal Eleanor Rice had made contact with Wilson who presented several forms of identification. Eleanor Rice searched him for weapons and had physical education teacher Phillip Browning stand with Wilson while Eleanor Rice left to find the police. Police were taken to his location where they arrested him.

=== Victims ===
8-year-old Shequila Bradley died at the scene, while 8-year-old Tequila Thomas died at Self Memorial Hospital three days after the shooting.

== Perpetrator ==
Wilson in 1988 being taken to his count trial

James William Wilson Jr. (born April 13, 1969) was 19 years old, unemployed, and living a rather isolated life with his paternal grandmother. He had frequently been a patient at psychiatric hospitals, starting at the age of 14. He was treated with the benzodiazepine drug Xanax to address his anxiety and depression and got relief from his symptoms with this medication. His family's insurance eventually ran out and he was no longer able to be treated as an in-patient. Wilson would take the prescription medication in about 10 days when it was meant to last several months. Wilson voluntarily entered the psychiatric unit of Self Memorial Hospital on several occasions. The first was about four years before the shooting, following an incident in which his grandmother and her husband called police after Wilson had locked them in a back bedroom and left the house in a violent frenzy. Because Wilson was a juvenile and no family court petition was signed, he was not arrested or jailed. He was referred to a psychiatrist at Self Memorial Hospital. There were other incidents in the coming years, but police were not called. Family members said they were not surprised at it happening and that they were all upset over the shooting, but were not shocked. Wilson was obsessed with the film Psycho and had watched it 500 times. He was also fascinated by mass murderers and how they carried out their crimes. Shortly before the shooting, Wilson had used his library card to check out crime books. Among the four books he checked out was an account of a mass murderer who buried bodies in his back yard and basement. The morning of the shooting, Wilson talked of the book to his grandmother and joked about a recent murder in Greenwood in which a friend of Wilson's shot his sister. Although the friend committed the murder with a gun, Wilson fabricated the story, saying that the murder was committed with an axe to make it seem more violent. Wilson often joked about violence and would make comments to family members, saying, “Do you think they get a thrill out of (whatever the violent scenario was)?” and then follow the statement with laughter.

=== Prosecution and sentencing ===
He was indicted for two counts of murder, nine counts of assault and battery with intent to kill, and one count of carrying a firearm. Wilson was convicted of the murders and on May 9, 1989, he was sentenced to death by electric chair. For the other charges, he was sentenced to 175 years' imprisonment. He is currently confined at the Broad River Correctional Institution in Columbia. He has been imprisoned on death row for 37 years, and his attorneys have sought an appeal to his sentence.

He was officially admitted into the prison system as a death row inmate on May 11, 1989. From February 19, 2009, to June 30, 2013, he committed eight separate incidents in prison, consisting of threatening to harm the guards or throwing "substance" around.

== Aftermath ==
After the shooting the teachers employed methods to help the students such as reducing the noise of the chairs with felt on their feet, and placing a large cupboard by the door to have something to barricade the entrance.

=== Memorials and tribute ===
A memorial garden was created in honor of the two deceased students and was created as "a better place for their families to come and remember them." A memorial nature trail was also constructed, with two benches, two birdhouses and two plaques behind the school.

== See also ==
- List of death row inmates in the United States
- List of school shootings in the United States by death toll
- List of school shootings in the United States (before 2000)
