= Murder of Tiffany Souers =

2006 rape and murder of a college student in South Carolina

- Tiffany Marie Souers
- Location: Central, South Carolina, US
- Date: May 25, 2006
- Attack type: Murder and rape
- Deaths: Tiffany Marie Souers, 20
- Perpetrator: Jerry Buck Inman
- Verdict: Pleaded guilty
- Convictions: Murder; Kidnapping; First-degree burglary First-degree criminal sexual conduct
- Sentence: Death

The rape and murder of Tiffany Marie Souers, an engineering student from Clemson University, took place on May 25, 2006, in her apartment in Central, South Carolina. The perpetrator was identified as Jerry Buck Inman (born December 19, 1970), who had previous convictions for sex offenses. Inman was tried, convicted and sentenced to death for Souers's rape and murder.

== Murder ==
2005 FDOC mugshot of Jerry Inman

On the evening of May 25, 2006, 20-year-old Tiffany Marie Souers, an engineering student of Clemson University, was last seen alive by her roommates before they left their off-campus apartment in Central, South Carolina, leaving her alone in the residence.

Later that day, Souers was attacked by a 35-year-old man named Jerry Buck Inman, who broke into her apartment. Inman tied up Souers's hands and feet, raped her, wrapped a bikini top around her neck, and strangled her to death. Inman later told police that he raped Souers and then decided to murder her to prevent her from identifying him as the assailant. He added that he stopped the strangulation after realizing Souers was dead when she ceased struggling.

After the murder, Inman stole an ATM card from Souers's residence before he fled the apartment. Inman used the victim's ATM card at two bank machines in Clemson, based on the surveillance footage that captured him at those locations. Subsequently, Inman escaped to Tennessee.

Souers's partially clad body was found by her roommate on the afternoon of May 26, 2006. An autopsy determined that she died as a result of asphyxia due to ligature strangulation with the bathing suit top.

== Charges ==
=== Arrest ===
During the initial investigation, there was neither a clear suspect nor an identifiable motive behind the murder. The apartment showed no signs of forced entry, which added to the difficulty of the investigative progress.

The police identified Jerry Inman as the killer after DNA testing matched him to samples of the perpetrator's genetic profile recovered from the victim's body. As a result, Inman was placed on the wanted list and arrest warrants were issued against him for Souers's murder.

On June 7, 2006, Inman was arrested near his parents' home in Dandridge, Tennessee. After his arrest, Inman waived extradition and he agreed to return to South Carolina, where he faced charges of murder, rape and kidnapping for Souers's death. He was linked to additional sex crimes in Alabama and Tennessee. After his capture, Inman confessed to the police that he was responsible for raping and murdering Souers.

=== Criminal history ===
Prior to raping and murdering Souers, Inman was convicted of sex offenses in North Carolina, Tennessee and Florida. In 1988, he was convicted of a second-degree sex offense in Buncombe County, North Carolina, and another in Tennessee. His 1987 Florida conviction closely mirrored the Souers case: at age 16, he broke into a Tampa apartment, where he attacked and tied up two women and raped one of them before he stole a purse and car. Inman was sentenced to 30 years' imprisonment by the Florida authorities, although he served the first nine years of that sentence in North Carolina prisons and another seven years in Florida before his release on September 1, 2005. According to the Florida Department of Corrections, Inman was released from a Florida prison on September 1, 2005, after he served 16 years behind bars for these above convictions.

After his release, Inman registered as a sex offender in Florida and North Carolina. However, he continued to commit further offenses up until Souers's murder and rape. On May 22, 2006, three days before Souers was killed, Inman broke into the house of a 28-year-old woman in Sevierville, Tennessee, where he raped her at knifepoint. A Sevier County jury from Tennessee indicted Inman for charges of aggravated rape and aggravated burglary in this particular case. A day later, on May 23, 2006, in Rainsville, Alabama, Inman broke into a 24-year-old woman's house and tied her up, attempting to rape her before he left her in the closet and stole her car and purse. For this case, Inman was charged with attempted rape by the Dekalb County authorities from Alabama.

=== Pre-trial ===
After Inman was charged with the murder of Souers, the 13th Circuit Solicitor's Office reviewed the case to determine whether to seek the death penalty in Inman's upcoming murder trial. Under South Carolina state law, offenders convicted of murder under certain aggravating circumstances could receive the death penalty as the maximum punishment. The family of Souers stated that they would support the prosecution's decision if they decided to pursue capital punishment. Meanwhile, Inman, who was deemed to have a high assault and escape risk, was transferred to the maximum security unit of Lee Correctional Institution, where he would be detained while pending trial for murder.

On August 22, 2006, State Attorney Bob Ariail announced he would seek the death penalty against Inman.

A year later, Inman's lawyers addressed the judge in a court hearing that Inman was willing to plead guilty on the condition that he would be sentenced by a jury rather than a judge. In South Carolina, offenders pleading guilty to capital offenses would have their sentences decided by only the judge. On September 14, 2007, Judge Edward Miller denied Inman's request to be sentenced by a jury upon his plea of guilt, and set a trial date of March 10, 2008.

In May 2008, a judge denied Inman's request to be tried by a jury selected from outside of Pickens County.

In June 2008, while in prison, Inman was caught in possession of a plastic homemade knife made out of a broken radio. It was alleged that he made the knife in order to attack and stab a corrections officer.

== Guilty plea and death penalty ==
On August 19, 2008, Jerry Inman pleaded guilty to all the charges of murder, robbery, rape and kidnapping in the death of Tiffany Souers.

As a result of his guilty plea, Inman was bound to be sentenced by the trial judge instead of a jury under South Carolina law. The sentencing trial of Inman began on September 8, 2008, and during the hearing, the defence stated that Inman felt so much guilt and shame that he considered himself an "animal" who deserved to die for what he did, and they cited it as a reason to seek life in prison for their client, since it would be a harder sentence for him.

Subsequently, the sentencing trial of Inman was delayed at one point and the judge allowed the defence more time to find and present new witnesses after an expert witness refused to testify. In January 2009, the penalty phase was again delayed after a lawyer of Inman needed to go for surgery. The penalty hearing was eventually set to resume on April 17, 2009.

On April 20, 2009, the judge refused the defence's motion to declare a mistrial, and the sentencing hearing continued on.

On April 22, 2009, Inman was sentenced to death by Circuit Court Judge Edward Miller. A few hours before his sentencing, Inman acknowledged the severity of his crimes and asked for the death sentence, stating he deserved to be put to death and he was too violent for any possible chance of rehabilitation. In his sentencing verdict, Judge Miller stated that the crime was "savage, brutal and unconscionable", which made it appropriate to impose the death penalty.

== Appeals ==
In September 2011, Jerry Inman appealed to the South Carolina Supreme Court to overturn his guilty plea and death penalty, on the basis that one of the prosecutors intimidated a key witness testifying for the defence back in his 2009 murder trial.

On December 28, 2011, the South Carolina Supreme Court denied Inman's appeal and upheld his death sentence and murder conviction. The court found that the prosecution's intimidation of the key defence witness amounted to misconduct but it was not severe enough to warrant the need to overturn Inman's conviction.

On October 1, 2012, the U.S. Supreme Court rejected Inman's appeal against his death sentence.

On April 21, 2020, a state judge overturned Inman's death sentence and ordered a re-sentencing trial, after citing a 2016 U.S. Supreme Court ruling which decreed that juries, not judges, should decide on whether to sentence a person to death.

On February 15, 2023, the South Carolina Supreme Court revoked the lower court's ruling to grant Inman a new sentencing hearing, and reinstated his death sentence.

== Death row and aftermath ==
After his sentencing, Jerry Inman was incarcerated on death row at the Kirkland Correctional Institution. An April 2022 report revealed there were 35 inmates, all of whom were male, held on South Carolina's death row, including Inman himself.

The number decreased to 32 by September 2023, after serial killer Quincy Allen, convicted cop murderer James Nathaniel Bryant and a third prisoner were removed from death row, and Inman was still on death row at that point. During that time, there was an informal moratorium on capital punishment in South Carolina because the state faced difficulties in procuring the required drugs to carry out executions by lethal injection, which was the only execution method permissible in South Carolina. Subsequently, the state passed a new law to revive the electric chair and approve the firing squad as alternative execution methods if lethal injection became unavailable. Eventually, Freddie Eugene Owens was put to death on September 20, 2024, marking South Carolina's first execution after the state's 13-year moratorium.

After the state put Owens to death, another four prisoners – Richard Bernard Moore, Marion Bowman Jr., Brad Sigmon and Mikal Mahdi – were also executed between November 2024 and April 2025. After these five men had their sentences carried out, Inman was one of 26 prisoners remaining on South Carolina's death row as of May 2025. After the executions of Stephen Stanko and Stephen Corey Bryant and the death of Fred Singleton by natural causes, the number fell to 23, with Inman still on the death row list.

Inman was considered to be one of South Carolina's most infamous murderers since the 1970s.

== See also ==
- Capital punishment in South Carolina
- List of death row inmates in the United States § South Carolina
