= Murder of Kandee Martin =

2001 arson-murder of a woman in South Carolina, U.S.

- Undated photo of Kandee Martin, who was murdered in 2001
- Location: Dorchester County, South Carolina, United States
- Date: February 16, 2001
- Attack type: Arson and murder by shooting
- Verdict: Guilty
- Convictions: Murder; Third-degree arson
- Sentence: Death – murder Ten years' imprisonment – third-degree arson
- Convicted: Marion Bowman Jr.

On February 16, 2001, in Dorchester County, South Carolina, United States, 21-year-old Kandee Louise Martin (Note: Her name was also spelled as KanDee Martin in some sources.) (October 2, 1979 – February 16, 2001) was shot to death by a high school acquaintance, who stuffed her body inside the trunk of her car and set fire to the vehicle, burning her body as a result. The killer, Marion Bowman Jr., was arrested and charged with murder and arson.

Bowman, who killed Martin over a monetary dispute, was found guilty of both counts, and sentenced to death for the charge of murdering Martin, while receiving a ten-year jail term for the other charge of third-degree arson. Bowman, who had since lost his appeals against the death penalty, was incarcerated on death row awaiting his execution at Broad River Correctional Institution, where he was eventually executed by lethal injection on January 31, 2025.

== Murder ==
On February 17, 2001, the burnt body of 21-year-old Kandee Louise Martin was found inside the trunk of her burned car in Dorchester County, South Carolina.

The day before, according to court sources, 20-year-old Marion Bowman Jr., a longtime resident of Branchville, South Carolina, was with his sister when he encountered Martin and her group of friends. Bowman had been released from both prison and a boot camp program after serving a two-year jail sentence and a 30-day term for two counts of third-degree burglary and petty larceny in the late-1990s. Bowman reportedly asked his sister to stop the car as he wanted to talk to Martin, whom he knew from high school. According to Bowman's sister, he asked Martin to return some money to him, and when Martin told him to wait until her conversation was finished, Bowman said that "that bitch be dead by dark."

That evening, Martin drove up to a house where Bowman and his friends had been drinking. Bowman and his cousin James Tywan Gadson boarded her car, and they went together to a remote place pointed out by Bowman. According to Gadson, he heard Bowman telling him that he wanted to kill Martin as they got out of the car, and while tailing behind Martin, Bowman whipped out a gun and fired three shots. Martin reportedly rushed forward to face Bowman and pleaded with him to spare her life as she had a child to take care of. Disregarding Martin's pleas for mercy, Bowman discharged his firearm twice, and shot Martin to death. He then proceeded to drag her body into the surrounding woods.

After murdering Martin, Bowman threatened Gadson to not tell anyone he killed Martin – notwithstanding the fact that he had bragged about the killing to others (including Hiram Johnson) – and later drove Martin's car back to town. He would later attempt to sell the car at the club, but failed to, and drove the car around with other people for the evening. After this, Bowman enlisted the help of another friend, Travis Felder, to drive the car back to the murder site. After parking the car, Bowman brought the body of Martin out from a nearby forest, and shoved it inside the trunk, before he set fire to the car. While burning the car, Bowman told Felder that he murdered Martin. After this, both men fled the scene.

== Trial of Marion Bowman Jr. ==
Mugshot of Marion Bowman Jr.

In June 2001, Marion Bowman Jr. was officially indicted by a grand jury for one count of murder and one count of third-degree arson. The offense of murder carries the death penalty under South Carolina state law.

On May 17, 2002, Bowman was officially put on trial before a St. George (in Dorchester County) jury for both charges of arson and murder. The prosecution was led by Walter Bailey, the First Circuit Solicitor. Bowman was represented by Norbert Cummings Jr. and Marva Hardee-Thomas during the trial, and during the procedure, the defense argued that the testimony of Gadson should not be trusted since he and the others involved in the case had taken plea deal agreements and he had a motivation for pinpointing Bowman as the shooter, and also argued that the gun may have been planted by investigators to further incriminate Bowman as the killer.

On May 24, 2002, after three hours of deliberation, Bowman was found guilty of murder and arson on both counts by the jury. The defense sought life imprisonment for Bowman, citing mitigation evidence that Bowman grew up in a dysfunctional family background with his mother's family having a history of severe alcoholism, and Bowman himself began abusing alcohol at age ten and even trafficked drugs at age 14. However, the prosecution sought the death penalty in relation to the aggravating circumstances and grave nature of the offenses.

On the same day of his conviction, Bowman was sentenced to death after the jury unanimously recommended the death penalty with respect to the murder charge. Bowman was also sentenced to ten years in prison for the other charge of third-degree arson.

Both Travis Felder and James Gadson were also dealt in court with lesser charges in relation to Martin's murder after they both reached plea deal agreements with the prosecution. Felder was sentenced to three years imprisonment suspended to three years probation for accessory after the fact of murder, while Gadson was sentenced to 20 years in jail for both misprision of felony and accessory after the fact of murder.

== Appeal process ==
After he was sentenced to death, Marion Bowman Jr. appealed to the South Carolina Supreme Court against his death sentence. On November 28, 2005, Bowman's direct appeal was dismissed by the South Carolina Supreme Court.

On January 10, 2018, the South Carolina Supreme Court dismissed another appeal from Bowman.

On March 26, 2020, U.S. District Judge Terry L. Wooten of the U.S. District Court for the District of South Carolina turned down Bowman's appeal and upheld both his conviction and sentence. In the appeal, Bowman earlier argued that he was innocent and that his conviction was due to ineffective counsel, who failed to rebut the testimony of Gadson, who made a plea deal before making the testimony and threatened with the death penalty, and as a result, the Sixth, Eighth, and Fourteenth Amendments to the United States Constitution were violated. In fact, Gadson had reportedly given inconsistent testimonies and it was alleged that one of the trial witnesses had confessed to being the real killer but not Bowman. These arguments were ultimately rejected.

On August 16, 2022, the 4th Circuit Court of Appeals rejected Bowman's appeal against the death penalty. Eventually, the U.S. Supreme Court rejected the final appeal of Bowman and finalized his death sentence.

As of 2022, Bowman was one of at least 35 men who remained incarcerated on death row in South Carolina. The number eventually fell to 32 after the commutation of serial killer Quincy Allen's death sentence to life imprisonment and two others who either had their sentences commuted or died of natural causes while on death row.

== Other legal issues ==
=== Lawsuit for lifting of media ban ===
During his time on death row, the case of Marion Bowman Jr. garnered attention from anti-death penalty groups and civil groups. One of them, the American Civil Liberties Union (ACLU), had taken up his case and aside from mounting efforts to seek clemency for him, the group also conducted an interview of Bowman in prison, hoping to raise awareness about his story and case.

However, in accordance with South Carolina prison policies, prisoners were not allowed to speak to the media (including in-person media interviews) or have their writings directly published, so as to prevent the potential leakage of confidential information or security breaches of the system. Due to this, the ACLU's interview video of Bowman was not allowed for broadcast in the media. For this issue, the ACLU filed a petition to the federal courts, seeking to lift the ban on the grounds that it violated the First Amendment free speech rights of prisoners, and potentially shielded the South Carolina Department of Corrections from real public accountability over possible cases of mistreatment of prisoners.

On September 5, 2024, the U.S. District Judge Jacquelyn D. Austin dismissed the lawsuit. The judge upheld that the state reserved the right to forbid the media's access to information that should not be made public and the media did not have special access to these sources.

On November 12, 2024, the ACLU filed an appeal to the 4th Circuit Court of Appeals and it is currently processed by a three-judge panel.

=== Lawsuit against state capital punishment laws ===
In 2023, Bowman was one of the several death row inmates who sued the state of South Carolina against its capital punishment laws, seeking to prohibit the use of the firing squad and electric chair on the grounds that they were cruel and unusual punishments and would cause unnecessary pain and suffering to the condemned, which made these execution methods unconstitutional. The state's legal representatives, however, responded that both the electric chair and firing squad fit the existing protocols and it was not necessitated in law that death had to be instantaneous or painless.

At that time, there was an unofficial moratorium on executions in South Carolina since the state's last execution in 2011 due to the scarcity of lethal injection drugs, in addition to the expiration of the state's existing drug supplies and various drug companies' refusal to sell their drugs to the state for executions. This problem prompted the state government to reintroduce the electric chair and pass new legislation designating firing squad executions as the alternative execution methods in case the option of lethal injection was unavailable. Eventually, the state successfully procured new drugs in September 2023 to restart executions by lethal injection.

On July 31, 2024, a five-judge panel of the South Carolina Supreme Court delivered its final verdict upholding the constitutionality of both the electric chair and firing squad, with a majority of the judges approving the two methods: three for firing squad and four for the electric chair. This decision allowed the possibility of resuming executions in South Carolina for all 32 inmates on the state's death row, including Bowman. At the time of this ruling, five condemned inmates – consisting of Bowman, Freddie Eugene Owens, Richard Bernard Moore, Brad Sigmon and Mikal Mahdi – had exhausted all avenues of appeal and they were the most likely inmates in line for imminent execution on a later date.

Eventually, the 13-year moratorium in South Carolina was lifted after one of the five inmates, Freddie Owens, was put to death on September 20, 2024. Owens's execution was followed by that of Richard Moore on November 1, 2024.

== Scheduling of execution date ==
After the loss of his legal motion in 2024, Marion Bowman Jr. remained on death row for murdering Kandee Martin until his execution in 2025.

On August 28, 2024, a court order was issued to allow the state to carry out a total of six executions over the following year, with each execution carried out five weeks apart from each other.

The other five inmates named on the list were Freddie Eugene Owens, Richard Bernard Moore, Brad Sigmon, Steven Bixby, and Mikal Mahdi. Owens and Moore – sentenced in 1999 and 2001 respectively – were the first two out of the six to be executed on September 20 and November 1, 2024, respectively.

After the executions of Owens and Moore, Bowman was expected to be the next condemned prisoner to be executed, since his death sentence was imposed in 2002. Given that Moore was put to death on November 1, 2024, it was speculated that Bowman would be executed five weeks later on December 6, 2024, and a death warrant would be issued on November 8, 2024, which was a Friday and the state often issued death warrants regularly on a Friday. However, the execution date was not set on that date itself.

On November 11, 2024, it was reported that Bowman and the remaining three condemned inmates on the execution schedule list had filed an appeal, asking the state to not execute them during the winter holiday period, and to hold off their executions until after Christmas and New Year's Day. Although the state rebutted in court that it was not new for the state to execute condemned inmates during winter holidays, including five between December 4, 1998 and January 8, 1999, the defense lawyers submitted a statement in court:

"Six consecutive executions with virtually no respite will take a substantial toll on all involved, particularly during a time of year that is so important to families."

On November 14, 2024, the South Carolina Supreme Court granted the inmates a temporary respite, agreeing to not authorize any new death warrants until at least January 3, 2025.

With this arrangement, Bowman and the other three prisoners in line for execution had their potential execution dates pushed back to 2025. On January 3, 2025, the South Carolina Supreme Court signed Bowman's death warrant, scheduling him to be put to death on January 31, 2025. Bowman had the opportunity to select any of the three execution methods to carry out his death sentence: electric chair, lethal injection or firing squad, and he was given a deadline of January 17, 2025.

On January 17, 2025, Bowman chose to be executed by lethal injection.

In an exclusive article by The Guardian, Bowman's lawyer revealed that after the court order regarding Bowman's execution schedule took effect in August 2024, Bowman was placed in 24-hour solitary confinement under the death watch, which emphasized on increased surveillance for the final months before the inmate is ultimately executed. Bowman's lawyers criticized the conditions of death row for inmates facing imminent execution as "inhumane," as it deprived these inmates of several basic entitlements, such as eating in a communal area with other inmates, and group recreational activities. Apart from this, before the death watch, Bowman was said to have spent his time on death row writing poetry and continued to contact his friends and family (including a granddaughter). Bowman also reportedly dedicated his time to bonding with the other inmates through Bible studies, prayer groups, and games. According to the article, Bowman had a close friendship with Richard Moore, who was like a father figure to him. While Bowman was on death row, Moore, who was ultimately executed on November 1, 2024, showed him how to cope with the toll of detention, taught him to read and play chess, and advised him to focus on not stressing over things beyond his control.

In response to Bowman's scheduled execution, Kandee Martin's family stated that they would not attend the execution, but they viewed it as an act of justice and closure after 24 years since they lost Martin. They stated that Martin did not have the opportunity to spend time with her son (who was two when she died) and become a grandmother, in contrast to Bowman, who had 24 years to continue to connect with his own family (including his daughter and granddaughter) from behind bars, and the family believed Bowman was indeed the real killer, dismissing his claims of innocence.

== Final appeals ==
On December 17, 2024, while his death warrant was still pending before the courts, Marion Bowman Jr. appealed to vacate his conviction on the grounds of prosecutorial misconduct.

Bowman claimed that he did not get a fair trial due to the prosecution failing to disclose certain key evidence during his trial, including the psychological problems and a possible confession from one trial witness, and criminal charges that were hanging over another trial witness, and it hindered Bowman's entitlement to a fair and impartial trial and effectively raised doubts over the validity of his conviction and sentence. It was also alleged that Bowman's trial lawyers were overtly sympathetic towards the victim, Kandee Martin, who was a White victim while they did not adequately defend Bowman, who was African-American and that racism played a part in his conviction, which Bowman's lawyers sought to overturn in favor of a new hearing.

Apart from his arguments over an unfair trial, Bowman also asked that his death sentence to be downgraded to life imprisonment without the possibility of parole. Bowman's counsel presented sworn statements from several former nurses and death row staff members, who described him as a gentle giant with a special ability to assist inmates with mental health issues in working with psychologists and adhering to their medication regimens. Additionally, Bowman served for many years as the official liaison between death row inmates and prison authorities.

In a public statement on January 2, 2025, Bowman stated that he had had sexual relations with Martin and sold drugs to her, but he continued to claim he never killed her. The statement was published a day before the South Carolina Supreme Court issued Bowman an execution date of January 31, 2025.

On January 8, 2025, Bowman asked for a postponement of his execution date until his appeal over constitutional violations of his trial was fully resolved.

On January 17, 2025, Bowman's appeal was denied by the South Carolina Supreme Court.

In another appeal filed on January 23, 2025, Bowman asked for more information on the pentobarbital deployed for lethal injection executions in South Carolina. He expressed his concerns that the lethal injection execution in his case would not go well, citing the autopsy results of Richard Bernard Moore, who was likewise executed by lethal injection on November 1, 2024. The report showed that there were fluid found in the lungs, which indicated that Moore "consciously experienced feelings of drowning and suffocation during the 23 minutes that it took to bring about his death." Apart from this, it was revealed that Moore was given two large doses of pentobarbital 11 minutes apart, and Bowman stated he required more information and explanation on this fact. However, an anesthesiologist stated that it was common to discover fluid inside the lungs of executed prisoners (specifically those who received lethal injection), and the state prosecutors also pointed out that Bowman could have opted for electric chair or firing squad if he was truly concerned about the implications of lethal injection.

U.S. District Judge Jacquelyn D. Austin heard the appeal and dismissed it on January 28, 2025, stating that Bowman was not entitled to increased access to information about the drugs planned for his lethal injection execution, and she stated that if Bowman still harboured concerns about the efficiency of the lethal injection drugs, he could still elect to be executed by firing squad or the electric chair.

On January 30, 2025, the eve of Bowman's impending execution, the U.S. Supreme Court dismissed Bowman's final appeal, and on that same day, Bowman released a statement through his lawyer that he would not petition for clemency from the South Carolina Governor Henry McMaster, claiming that he rather not spend the rest of his life in prison for a crime he maintained he never committed. On the other hand, Bowman's family pleaded for clemency from the governor, who had the sole prerogative to commute Bowman's death sentence to life imprisonment if he accepted the clemency plea. Ultimately, Bowman's death sentence was not commuted, and since 1976, no governor in South Carolina had ever granted clemency to a death row inmate on the verge of imminent execution.

== Execution ==
On January 31, 2025, 44-year-old Marion Bowman Jr. was put to death by lethal injection in the Broad River Correctional Institution. After being injected with a lethal amount of pentobarbital, Bowman was pronounced dead at 6:27pm.

Bowman was the first condemned person from both South Carolina and the whole of the U.S. to be executed in the year of 2025. Before his death sentence was carried out, Bowman reportedly ordered a last meal of fried shrimp, fish, oysters, chicken wings, chicken tenders, onion rings, banana pudding and German chocolate cake, in addition to pineapple juice and cranberry juice.

Bowman, through his attorneys, released a last statement that ended with one of his poems.

"I did not kill Kandee Martin. I’m innocent of the crimes, I’m here to die for. Living behind these walls has taught me a lot about loss and grief. It is never easy, but I have learned tofind comfort in sharing good memories and funny stories. My suffering will soon be at an end, but Iknow it is the beginning for others. Please keep your head up, remember I love you, and please share your memories of me. I know that Kandee’s family is in pain, they are justifiably angry. If my death brings them some relief andability to focus on the good times and funny stories, then I guess it will have served a purpose. I hope they find peace.To my family, friends, and supporters, I have nothing to give, but I have gained so much. I have tried togive a good return on your investment with love and care. I had bad moments but never a bad daybecause there were so many people that I could reach out to, investing in me and giving me a hand up. We all ended up as family, and I got a whole lot of family. Thank you Over the years I have learned that we are labeled as the worst of the worst. None of these guys that I have gotten to know and grown to love are the people that they were when they had their moment that cost them everything. If the world could see us in our day to day, they would have a different view of the death penalty. We all pray for grace and forgiveness, but the outside world is stuck with images of monsters perpetrated by the State, while our real voices are silenced. We are not what the State labels us to be. We are kind, caring, loving people, and it’s a shame the world can’t see that."

Last Breath or Sigh

Last breath or sigh of relief, It was God who breathed the breath of life into Adam. So why is taking our last breath so hard to fathom? How many times you've held your breath, When you've wondered what would happen if you exhaled. Overcoming your fears, doubts, and many tears, And you know God's pulled or pushed you through, Only to release a sigh of relief. Let there be no mistaking—I've felt love with every breath I've taken. I hope I've given a good return on that investment. So, when I've breathed my last gasp, The good Lord just took back what He gave me as breath. Know that I'm in God's grasp, And it's in His bosom I'll rest in. Did I take a last breath or sigh of relief? Last breath or sigh of relief. Peace, Love, and Respect.

‐ Marion Bowman Jr.

The Martin family released a statement to Charleston-area media. "Our hearts go out to (Bowman's) family, but we do feel justice was served. We know from experience how hard it is to lose someone."

After Bowman's execution, condemned inmate Brad Sigmon had his execution scheduled for March 7, 2025. He filed a motion to stay the execution while his lawyers could obtain the autopsy report from Bowman's execution. The report showed that Bowman received two doses of pentobarbital rather than the single dose the State claimed, and may have consciously felt a drowning sensation while being executed.

== See also ==
- Capital punishment in South Carolina
- List of people executed in South Carolina
- List of people executed in the United States in 2025

Executions carried out in South Carolina
Preceded by Richard Bernard Moore November 1, 2024	Marion Bowman Jr. January 31, 2025	Succeeded by Brad Keith Sigmon March 7, 2025
Executions carried out in the United States
Preceded by Kevin Ray Underwood – Oklahoma December 19, 2024	Marion Bowman Jr. – South Carolina; January 31, 2025	Succeeded by Steven Lawayne Nelson – Texas February 5, 2025
