= Jeffrey Motts =

American convicted serial killer (1975–2011)

Jeffrey Brian Motts
- Born: May 5, 1975; South Carolina, U.S.
- Died: May 6, 2011 (aged 36); Broad River Correctional Institution, South Carolina, U.S.
- Cause of death: Execution by lethal injection
- Convictions: Murder (3 counts); Forgery; Armed robbery
- Penalty: 16 years' imprisonment (1996); Life imprisonment (1997); Death (2007)

Details
- Victims: Clyde Camby, 79; Etta Osteen, 73; Charles Martin, 26
- Date: April 3, 1995 and December 8, 2005
- Location: South Carolina

Jeffrey Brian Motts (May 5, 1975 – May 6, 2011) was an American convicted serial killer, found guilty of murdering three people between 1995 and 2005. Motts first killed his great-aunt Etta Osteen and her brother-in-law Clyde Camby on April 3, 1995, in order to steal money from them to buy drugs. Motts, who was 19 at the time of the murders, was sentenced to life in prison in 1997. Ten years after killing Osteen and Camby, on December 8, 2005, Motts murdered a fellow prisoner Charles "Chuck" Martin while incarcerated at the Perry Correctional Institution, and for this homicide, Motts was sentenced to death and executed on May 6, 2011, after he waived his right to appeal against the death sentence. Motts remained the last person to be executed in South Carolina for 13 years before Freddie Eugene Owens was executed in 2024 for a 1997 robbery-murder case.

== Murders of Clyde Camby and Etta Osteen ==
On April 3, 1995, 19-year-old Jeffrey Brian Motts committed the murders of his two relatives in Pacolet, South Carolina.

On that day itself, Motts broke into the house of his great aunt, 73-year-old Etta Louise Osteen, who lived there with her 79-year-old brother-in-law Clyde Lloyd Camby. Inside the house, Motts tied up Camby before he shot him close range in the cheek, killing him on the spot. Osteen was also tied up, but as she tried to escape the house in spite of having her legs tied up, Motts gunned her down by firing a fatal shot in the back.

According to sources, Motts committed the murders as he intended to rob both Osteen and Camby in order to buy drugs to feed his drug addiction. The bodies of both Camby and Osteen were not found until three days later, and when the police arrived at the scene, one of the victims, Camby, was found with his pockets emptied and turned inside out, and the car of the victims was missing from the house. The same day when the murders were discovered, Motts was arrested alongside another man for unrelated charges of burglary.

== First murder trial ==
After his arrest, Jeffrey Motts was charged with the murders of Clyde Camby and Etta Osteen. In March 1997, the prosecution officially announced they would pursue the death penalty for Motts on both murder counts. Before he stood trial for murder, Motts was found guilty in separate trials for unrelated charges of forgery and resisting arrest, and sentenced to 16 years in prison as a result. Christian Hood, the other man arrested together with Motts in the same burglary case, was cleared of all charges after some investigations.

On October 13, 1997, Motts officially stood trial before a Spartanburg County jury for his relatives' murders.

On October 18, 1997, the jury found Motts guilty of the double murder.

On October 21, 1997, the sentencing phase of the trial commenced and the jury began to deliberate on sentence. The prosecution sought the death penalty on the basis that Motts brutally murdered his two relatives with the motive of perpetuating robbery. However, the defence argued that Motts should be spared the death sentence and cited that he had low IQ and diminished responsibility at the material time, and he did not have a history of violent offences.

On October 22, 1997, Circuit Judge Gary Clary sentenced Motts to two consecutive life sentences on both counts of murder, and 30 years for armed robbery, after the jury deadlocked on the death penalty for the double murder, thus allowing Motts to evade the death penalty. Motts's sentences for robbery and murder were all ordered to run consecutively with the 16-year sentence he received for forgery; each of Mott's life sentences carried the possibility of parole after a minimum of 30 years.

Reportedly, Motts's grandmother, Edith Jackson, was the only relative of Motts to plead for mercy on behalf of her grandson in court, while nearly the rest of the family were not as forgiving and hoped for the death sentence. Mary Ann Green, the niece of Etta Osteen, stated she was especially disappointed and angered by the fact that Motts would not be executed, compounded by the fact that she was still recovering from the heartbreak of losing her son to murder. Green's son was murdered in another case, and the two killers responsible were all sentenced to death.

== Murder of Charles Martin ==
On December 8, 2005, ten years after murdering his two relatives, Motts committed another murder while in prison.

Prior to the murder, Motts, who was serving life at the Perry Correctional Institution, got involved in a dispute with the victim, Charles Douglas Martin (alias Chuck Martin), over a stolen radio. Motts was apparently angry at Martin for having lied about the radio and even spread false tales to other inmates that Motts secretly hid a homemade knife found in another prisoner's cell. At that time, Martin, a resident of Tennessee, was serving a five-year jail term for assault and trespassing, and was set to be released on parole in January 2006.

Despite their request to be kept apart from each other, both Martin and Motts ended up in the same cell together in November 2005. Barely a month after they became cellmates, Motts would murder Martin on December 8, 2005, after he and Martin had a quarrel that morning. Out of rage, Motts knocked Martin unconscious and even tied him up using cloth torn from his bedsheet. When Martin regained consciousness thereafter, he pleaded with Motts to spare his life, but Motts responded by strangling him for five minutes, and also tie some sheets around Martin's neck. 26-year-old Charles Martin died as a result of the strangulation. After murdering Martin, Motts ate his breakfast and smoked a cigarette, before he dragged the body into a common area.

Martin's corpse was left in a common area of the prison's medium and minimum-security unit, and several other prisoners alerted the correction officer of Martin's death. Deputy Coroner Linda Holbrook of the Greenville County Coroner's Office performed the autopsy on the body and ruled Martin's death as a homicide, and the cause of death was certified to be strangulation.

== Second murder trial ==
On April 21, 2006, four months after he murdered Charles Martin, Jeffrey Motts was charged with murder, and as a result of this killing, Motts faced the death penalty a second time, and Thirteenth Circuit Solicitor Bob Ariail confirmed he would seek the death penalty on account of Motts's prior two convictions for the 1995 murders of Etta Osteen and Clyde Camby.

On July 25, 2006, a Greenville County grand jury indicted Motts for the murder of Martin. The trial of Motts was expected to begin before the fall of 2007.

On December 1, 2007, Jeffrey Motts stood trial for the murder of Charles Martin, and the prosecution adduced the fact that Motts confessed to the murder while presenting their case.

At the end of the trial, Motts was found guilty of murder by the jury. During the sentencing phase, Prosecutor Bob Ariail sought the death penalty, drawing attention to the fact that Motts, who still killed despite his life sentence, would have been eligible for parole by 2027 based on his prior life terms, and citing the possibility that Motts might kill more people in prison, Ariail added that there were "mean and evil people in this world" that did not deserve to live in society, implying that Motts was one such individual in this case. Motts, on the other hand, sought mercy and stated that he did not wish for his family to be punished.

On December 4, 2007, Motts was sentenced to death upon the jury's unanimous recommendation for capital punishment.

== Execution ==
After he was condemned to death row, Jeffrey Motts expressed that he did not wish to appeal his death sentence, and requested to be executed, although the death sentence was required to be assessed by a mandatory appellate review from the South Carolina Supreme Court. Ultimately, on March 21, 2011, the South Carolina Supreme Court ruled that Motts was mentally competent to waive his appeals and face execution, while at the same time, confirmed his death sentence.

On April 18, 2011, the South Carolina Supreme Court signed Motts's death warrant, and his death sentence was scheduled to be carried out on May 6, 2011.

As the execution drew near, Motts's lawyer told the press that he would not appeal to stop the execution of Motts, and would not challenge the state's decision to their plan to change the drugs meant for his client's upcoming execution, in line with Motts's decision to be executed.

On May 6, 2011, one day after his 36th birthday, Jeffrey Brian Motts was executed by lethal injection at the Broad River Correctional Institution. For his last meal, Motts ordered a pizza, fried fish, popcorn shrimp, cherry cheesecake and sweet iced tea. His last words were, "To my mom and grandma, happy Mother's Day. I know this is a sad one but let us remember the good times. I am finally free and at peace in heaven." Motts additionally made a warning to children about the dangers of drugs, and also apologized to the families of his victims and himself, as well as those he harmed throughout the process.

== Aftermath ==
Jeffrey Brian Motts was the 43rd convict to be executed in South Carolina since the 1976 resumption of capital punishment in the United States. Ever since his execution in 2011, Motts was the most recent person to be executed by the state of South Carolina, and the state had not conducted further executions for the following 13 years, due to the lack of lethal injection drugs and the state's inability to secure these drugs for lethal injection executions. This eventually led the state to reintroduce the electric chair and legalize the firing squad as alternative execution methods in the event that lethal injection was unavailable, and allow the inmate to choose their preferred execution method.

On September 20, 2024, 13 years after the execution of Motts, convicted murderer Freddie Eugene Owens was put to death by lethal injection for the 1997 robbery-murder of Irene Grainger Graves, therefore becoming the first condemned criminal to be executed in South Carolina at the end of the state's 13-year moratorium on capital punishment.

Motts was the eighth condemned prisoner from South Carolina to waive his appeals and volunteer for execution since 1976.

== See also ==
- Capital punishment in South Carolina
- List of people executed in South Carolina
- List of people executed in the United States in 2011
- List of serial killers in the United States
- Volunteer (capital punishment)

Executions carried out in South Carolina
Preceded by Thomas Ivey May 8, 2009	Jeffrey Motts; May 6, 2011	Succeeded by Freddie Eugene Owens September 20, 2024
Executions carried out in the United States
Preceded by Cary Kerr – Texas May 3, 2011	Jeffrey Motts – South Carolina; May 6, 2011	Succeeded by Benny Stevens – Mississippi May 10, 2011
