= Stephen Corey Bryant =

Executed American convicted spree killer (1981–2025)

- 2021 mugshot of Bryant
- Born: April 12, 1981
- Died: November 14, 2025 (aged 44); Broad River Correctional Institution, South Carolina, U.S.
- Status: Executed by firing squad
- Convictions: Murder (x3); Assault and battery with intent to kill (x2); Threatening life of family or public official Burglary (x3); Armed robbery Arson; Possession of weapon
- Penalty: Death (September 11, 2008)

Details
- Victims: 3
- Date: October 5–13, 2004
- Location: Sumter County, South Carolina
- Imprisoned at: Broad River Correctional Institution

Stephen Corey Bryant (April 12, 1981 – November 14, 2025) was an American spree killer convicted of the 2004 fatal shootings of three men in Sumter County, South Carolina. Throughout an eight-day period in October 2004, Bryant shot each of his victims in four separate incidents, killing three of them and leaving a fourth seriously injured.

The first deceased victim, Bryant's acquaintance Clifton Dale Gainey, was shot and killed before being abandoned on the road; the second deceased victim, Willard Irving Tietjen Jr., was fatally shot inside his home during a robbery; and the final deceased victim, Christopher Earl Burgess, was shot dead and left on a rural road after encountering Bryant at a convenience store.

Bryant was found guilty of three counts of murder and sentenced to death on September 11, 2008. He was executed by firing squad on November 14, 2025.

== 2004 Sumter County killings ==
Between October 5 and October 13, 2004, in Sumter County, South Carolina, 23-year-old Stephen Corey Bryant perpetrated a series of shootings that led to the deaths of three men and a fourth person wounded.

Bryant conducted his first burglary on October 5, 2004. On October 8, he conducted another on a separate house. Bryant stole a .40 caliber Smith & Wesson handgun from the house. Later that same day, Bryant shot a man in the back who was fishing near a local river, but the man, 56-year-old Clinton Brown, survived his injuries. Brown was reportedly able to drive himself to a hospital to seek treatment.

The next day, Bryant went out with his friend and colleague, 36-year-old Clifton Gainey, to buy beer. According to sources, Bryant shared a close friendship with Gainey, and they often went out for fishing trips together and spent time with each other's families. Bryant used the gun to shoot Gainey in the head, killing him, and left his body behind on a rural road. After the shooting, Bryant arrived at Gainey's rented trailer, which he set on fire after stealing electronics and an aquarium. At the time of his death, Gainey was survived by his two sons, mother and brother.

Bryant entered the home of 62-year-old retired U.S. Air Force sergeant Willard Tietjen on October 11, 2004 and shot him nine times. Bryant proceeded to steal off of Tietjen's finger and used a cigarette to burn the victim's face and eyes. He then burglarized the house and stole several power tools and other valuables. While Bryant was ransacking the house, Tietjen's wife and daughter called the victim, and Bryant picked up the phone to inform them separately that Tietjen was dead. Before he fled the house, Bryant used the victim's blood to write a message, "Victem 4 in 2 weeks. Catch me if u can". Tietjen's body was found on the same day he was killed.

Two days after murdering Tietjen, 35-year-old Christopher Burgess encountered Bryant outside a local convenience store. After the pair left the store, Bryant shot Burgess twice, once in the head and another in the chest. Less than two hours after the murder, a hunter discovered Burgess's corpse lying on a road bed in a rural area.

== Arrest and charges ==
Stephen Bryant was arrested at his girlfriend's home for the murders on October 13, 2004. The following day, Bryant was charged with three counts of murder, two counts of burglary, two counts of weapons possession, and one count each of armed robbery and arson. Further investigations raised the possibility of more charges for Bryant.

In the aftermath of the murders, the bereaved families of the victims petitioned to the state to provide financial aid to cover the funeral expenses. The spree murders committed by Bryant shocked the whole community, and according to Bryant's landlord and workplace supervisor, the people around Bryant described him as a "nice" person and were shocked to hear he was arrested for the murders. Experts believed that, based on observations, Bryant himself displayed antisocial behavior and impulsivity, along with poor problem-solving skills, which could have explained the motive behind the murders.

While he was awaiting trial, in October 2005, Bryant assaulted a correctional officer at Sumter-Lee Regional Detention Center. As a result, Bryant was charged with the assault, and a transfer to another prison was arranged. Earlier the same month, Bryant allegedly threw urine on the door of a fellow inmate's prison cell, causing the inmate to be splashed with urine on his hands and shirt.

In April 2007, Sumter County prosecutor Kelly Jackson announced that he would seek the death penalty for Bryant.

== Murder trial ==
Bryant pled guilty to all three counts of murder and nine other lesser charges on August 8, 2008. Sumter County Prosecutor Kelly Jackson stated that there was no plea deal reached with the defense, and he would seek the death penalty for Bryant pertaining to the robbery-murder of Willard Tietjen. A sentencing trial was set to begin on September 2, 2008.

During the sentencing phase, the defense argued that Bryant should not receive the death penalty, noting that he had been a victim of childhood sexual abuse from relatives and had long struggled with drug addiction, which they said contributed to brain damage. They contended that, in the months leading up to the killings, Bryant used drugs in an attempt to numb the lingering trauma from his past. The prosecution, however, maintained that the murders were premeditated and carried out with extreme cruelty, which were the factors they cited in urging the court to impose the death penalty.

On September 11, 2008, Circuit Judge Thomas Russo sentenced Bryant to death for the murder of Willard Tietjen, in addition to two life sentences for the murders of Clifton Gainey and Christopher Burgess.

== Appeals and death row ==
After he was condemned to death row, Stephen Bryant was incarcerated at the Broad River Correctional Institution in 2008. During his 17-year stay on death row, Bryant was disciplined twice for offenses in prison, one for fighting without a weapon in 2009, and one for possessing a weapon in 2023.

The South Carolina Supreme Court dismissed Bryant's direct appeal against his death sentence on January 7, 2011. 14 years later on January 28, 2025, Bryant lost his appeal to the 4th U.S. Circuit Court of Appeals. The court rejected Bryant's claim of intellectual disabilities and fetal alcohol spectrum disorder, which the defense claimed to be caused by the alcohol abuse of Bryant's mother while pregnant with him.

Bryant's final appeal was denied on October 14, 2025, by the U.S. Supreme Court, thus officiating his eligibility to receive an execution date. The South Carolina Attorney General filed a motion to schedule Bryant's execution date shortly after he exhausted all avenues of appeal.

== Execution ==
=== Death warrant ===
The South Carolina Supreme Court signed a death warrant for Stephen Bryant on October 17, 2025, setting his execution date for November 14 of that year. Under South Carolina state law, prisoners facing execution are allowed to choose their preferred execution method: execution by firing squad, lethal injection or the electric chair. Should the prisoner in question fail to choose a method by their given deadline, he or she by default would be executed in the electric chair. Bryant was issued a deadline of October 31, 2025.

Before the death warrant was finalized, Bryant's lawyers reportedly sought to delay the death warrant due to the US federal government shutdown, given that they worked for the federal court system. The request, however, was not accepted by the South Carolina Supreme Court.

Bryant chose to be put to death by firing squad. He became the third inmate in South Carolina to choose this method since the state resumed executions in 2024, following the executions of convicted murderers Brad Sigmon and Mikal Mahdi.

=== Final appeal ===
Bryant's lawyers filed a final appeal to the South Carolina Supreme Court on November 6, 2025, and sought to stay his execution. They stated that Bryant's criminal conduct was a result of his mother's alcohol and drug use during her pregnancy and it caused him brain damage that affected his ability to be a law-abiding citizen. However, the prosecution argued for the execution to move forward as scheduled, stating that Bryant's murderous and sadistic actions were deliberate acts of evil, and he was "methodical, cunning, and took pleasure in deadly rampage." The appeal was denied four days later by the South Carolina Supreme Court.

Bryant's final recourse was to appeal to South Carolina governor Henry McMaster for clemency. If approved, Bryan's death sentence would have been commuted to life imprisonment without parole. Minutes before the execution proceeded, which is standard timing for governors for announce whether they will grant a commutation of sentence, McMaster refused the clemency petition submitted by Bryant. No South Carolina governors have granted clemency or pardons since the death penalty resumed in the U.S. in 1976. Since South Carolina reinstated the death penalty in 1977, Bryant became the 50th person executed in the state. Outside of South Carolina, the firing squad has only been used on three other prisoners on death row, all of them in Utah, with the most recent being Ronnie Lee Gardner in 2010.

=== Firing squad ===
Bryant was put to death by firing squad at the Broad River Correctional Institution on November 14, 2025. The execution process began at 6:02 pm, with a doctor announcing his death at 6:05 pm. Bryant was the third person to be executed by a firing squad in South Carolina. His last meal consisted of spicy mixed seafood stir-fry, fried fish over rice, egg rolls, stuffed shrimp, two candy bars and German chocolate cake. He made no final statement.

== See also ==
- Capital punishment in South Carolina
- List of most recent executions by jurisdiction
- List of people executed in South Carolina
- List of people executed in the United States in 2025

Executions by firing squad in the United States
Preceded by Mikal Deen Mahdi – South Carolina April 11, 2025	Stephen Corey Bryant – South Carolina; November 14, 2025	Succeeded by most recent
Executions carried out in South Carolina
Preceded by Stephen Christopher Stanko June 13, 2025	Stephen Corey Bryant; November 14, 2025	Succeeded by most recent
Executions carried out in the United States
Preceded by Bryan Frederick Jennings – Florida November 13, 2025	Stephen Corey Bryant – South Carolina; November 14, 2025	Succeeded by Richard Barry Randolph – Florida November 20, 2025
