= Mikal Mahdi =

Executed American convicted spree killer (1983–2025)

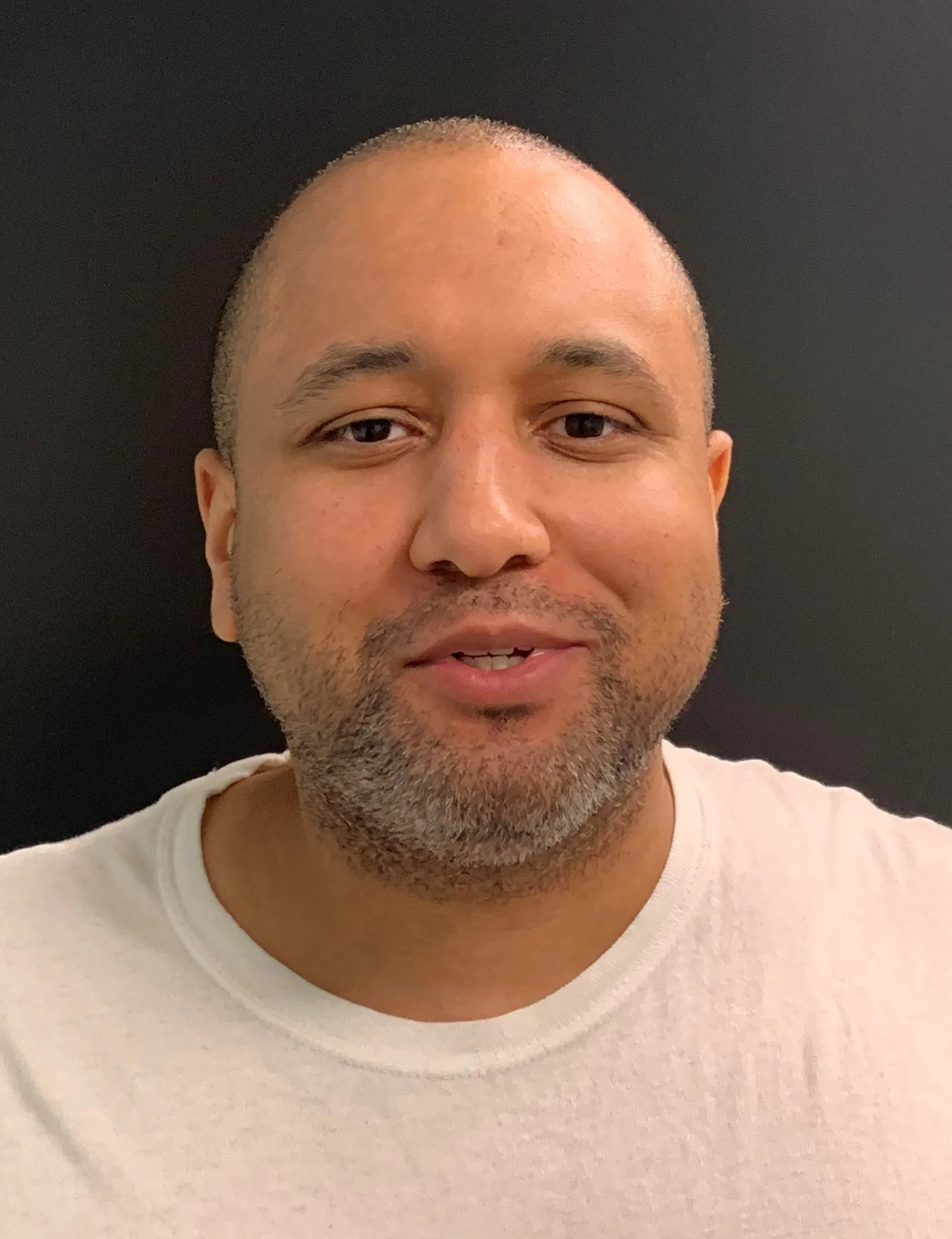
- Mahdi in 2023
- Born: March 20, 1983; Virginia, U.S.
- Died: April 11, 2025 (aged 42); Broad River Correctional Institution, South Carolina, U.S.
- Status: Executed by firing squad
- Motive: Robbery
- Convictions: Virginia; Assault; South Carolina; Murder; Second-degree burglary; Grand larceny; North Carolina; First-degree murder
- Penalty: Virginia; 93 months' imprisonment, with 15 years' probation (assault); South Carolina; Death (murder); 15 years' imprisonment (second-degree burglary); Ten years' imprisonment (grand larceny); North Carolina; Life imprisonment without the possibility of parole (first-degree murder)

Details
- Victims: 3
- Date: Virginia, North and South Carolina; July 14–17, 2004
- Country: United States
- Imprisoned at: Broad River Correctional Institution, South Carolina

Mikal Deen Mahdi (Note: Some sources spell his full name as "Mikal Dean Mahdi".) (March 20, 1983 – April 11, 2025) was an American convicted spree killer who was executed for the murder of a police officer in South Carolina. Over a period of three days in July 2004, Mahdi, then a resident of Virginia, went on a multistate crime spree, committing carjacking, firearm robbery, and three murders, two of which he was tried for and found guilty.

Mahdi fled the state after murdering a man in Brunswick County, Virginia, following a drug deal gone wrong. Although Mahdi confessed to that crime, he was never tried because of his two later murder convictions. Mahdi then robbed and killed a 29-year-old convenience store clerk, Christopher Jason Boggs, in Winston-Salem, North Carolina, on July 15, 2004. Two days after the murder of Boggs, Mahdi carjacked a man and stole his car in Columbia, South Carolina, before fleeing to a local farm in Calhoun County, South Carolina, where he murdered 56-year-old off-duty police officer James Myers, whose body was doused in diesel fuel and burned by Mahdi.

Mahdi went on the run for about four days before he was arrested in Florida on July 21, 2004, and extradited back to South Carolina to be charged with the fatal shooting of Myers. Mahdi was convicted of the murder and other charges in South Carolina and sentenced to death in 2006. After his extradition to North Carolina for trial, Mahdi was sentenced to life without parole in 2011 for the murder of Boggs.

On April 11, 2025, Mahdi was executed by firing squad—only the second such execution in South Carolina and the fifth in the United States since 1976—but the execution was botched when the squad missed the intended target, resulting in a prolonged death.

== Background and personal life ==
Mikal Deen Mahdi was born in Virginia on March 20, 1983, and he was raised in Lawrenceville, Virginia. According to court documents, Mahdi had a troubled and "chaotic" childhood. Prior to Mahdi's birth, Mahdi's father converted to Islam and changed his name to Shareef; he himself came from a dysfunctional family with a history of alcoholism. Shareef did not complete high school; instead, he joined the Marines, from which he had an honorable discharge. (Note: Court sources, however, stated that there were unspecified circumstances revolving around the discharge, which would have questioned whether the discharge was honorable or not.) At age 27, Shareef had an arranged marriage with a 16-year-old girl from Richmond and had two sons, Mikal and his older brother Saleem. Mikal's mother left the family in 1986. Shareef did not pay much attention to his sons and had a history of altercations with law enforcement officers. Although Shareef tried to work odd jobs to take care of his family, he failed.

In 1991, Shareef sent his sons to live with relatives. Saleem went to live with an aunt in Texas, and Mahdi went to live with his paternal uncle and aunt in Maryland when he was eight years old. He completed second and third grade at Scotts Branch Elementary School in Baltimore. Mahdi was an active student of sorts, but he faced disciplinary issues like respect for authority and teachers, and his reading and writing skills were below grade levels. School reports reveal that Mahdi had low self-esteem and often had difficulty with relationships with others. He dropped out in the third grade. By the age of 21, at the time of the 2004 crime spree, Mahdi had completed both a GED and community college.

Mahdi was diagnosed with major depressive disorder at age nine on August 23, 1992. He was involuntarily admitted to a psychiatric facility due to a suicide threat and was discharged on October 19, 1992, from the Walter P Carter Center. Mahdi returned to live with his father and brother in Virginia, where he first committed breaking and entering in December 1997. Mahdi was convicted of two counts of grand larceny and two counts of breaking and entering. He served time in a juvenile facility, where he spent 75 days in solitary confinement from the age of 14 to 17 and another eight months of solitary confinement at age 21. After his release, Mahdi resided with his mother in Richmond.

In 2001, Mahdi was convicted of attacking a police officer in Virginia and sentenced to 93 months in prison. He also was given 15 years of probation and released in May 2004, but two months later, he committed a spree of murders across three different states.

== 2004 crime spree and murders ==
From July 14 to 17, 2004, Mahdi committed various crimes across three or four states, including two murders: one of a convenience store worker in North Carolina and another of a police officer in South Carolina.

In 2025, it was revealed for the first time that Mahdi was allegedly involved in a 2004 murder case in his home state of Virginia, which occurred before the two killings in the Carolinas, bringing his total number of suspected murder victims to three. Mahdi's murder spree remained one of the most notorious death penalty cases in South Carolina.

=== Murder of Greg Jones ===
Sometime on or before July 14, 2004, Mahdi, then 21 years old, allegedly killed a man near his home in Virginia. Based on a media report and Virginia police sources, the victim Greg Jones was found dead about two miles away from Mahdi's residence. Allegedly, Mahdi stabbed and killed him after a drug deal between them had gone wrong, and Mahdi fled from Virginia after committing the crime. He was subsequently identified as the killer after the Virginia police recovered a knife from Mahdi's house. DNA tests confirmed that both Mahdi's DNA and Jones's blood were on the knife.

=== Murder of Christopher Boggs ===
On July 14, 2004, after killing Jones, Mahdi stole a .380-caliber pistol from his neighbor, as well as a station wagon and a set of Virginia license plates. Mahdi drove the stolen car out of Virginia and headed to North Carolina. The next day, in Winston-Salem, North Carolina, Mahdi entered a convenience store and selected a can of beer. While the store clerk, 29-year-old Christopher Jason Boggs, was checking Mahdi's identification card, Mahdi fired the gun point-blank, fatally shooting Boggs in the face. As Boggs collapsed on the floor, Mahdi fired another shot at Boggs's body. After murdering Boggs, Mahdi attempted to open the cash register to steal money, but after failing to do so, Mahdi left the store with the beer and drove to South Carolina.

=== Murder of James Myers ===
On July 17, 2004, two days after reaching South Carolina, Mahdi murdered 56-year-old off-duty policeman James Edward Myers. (Note: Although it was reported widely that Myers was killed on July 17, 2004, it was also reported differently by some sources that Myers's murder occurred on July 18, 2004, instead of July 17.)

Prior to the murder itself, Mahdi had armed himself with a gun and carjacked a driver named Corey Pitts while in downtown Columbia, South Carolina. He stole Pitts's car and replaced the car's license plates with the stolen license plates from Virginia. He later headed southeast. After driving for 35 minutes, Mahdi reached a gas station and attempted to buy gas with a credit card, which the gas pump rejected. Mahdi fruitlessly spent 45 minutes to an hour to get the pump to work, but this led to suspicion by the gas station's workers, who called the police, and Mahdi was forced to flee on foot.

On the same day, Mahdi arrived in Calhoun County, South Carolina and went into hiding on a local farm, where he spent the day watching TV and examining the gun collection stored inside the farm's workshop. The farm belonged to 56-year-old Captain James Myers of the Orangeburg Department of Public Safety. Myers, who had served at least three decades as a firefighter and police officer, was then away from the farm, celebrating the birthday of his daughter, sister, and wife at a beach.

After the celebration, Myers went back to his farm, and Mahdi, who spotted Myers, grabbed Myers's .22-caliber rifle, holding Myers at gunpoint before fatally shooting him. Myers was struck nine times; three times in the head, five times in the chest, and once in the left hand. Mahdi then proceeded to pour diesel fuel on Myers's body before setting it on fire. Mahdi stole the .22-caliber rifle along with Myers's police-issued assault rifle and personal shotgun, and escaped from the farm in Myers's police-issued truck.

Later that evening, Myers's wife, Amy Tripp Myers, also a law enforcement officer, became worried when her husband did not return home. Amy drove to the farm, discovered Myers's burned body lying in a pool of blood at the workshop, and reported the matter to the police.

Janice Ross, MD, of Newberry Pathologists Associates conducted a postmortem examination on Myers's corpse, finding that Myers had sustained nine gunshot wounds, including three to his head. According to Dr. Ross's report, two of the shots traveled from the top of Myers's head down to the base of his skull, suggesting Myers was either down or slumping when the shots were fired and that because all of the head wounds reached his brain, the shooting led to immediate unconsciousness and caused Myers's death. One of the shots to Myers's chest had struck both his lung and his heart.

== Manhunt and arrest ==
After the murder of James Myers, Mahdi stole the victim's truck and fled to Florida.

Through their investigations, the police were able to link Mahdi to the murder of Myers and conducted a manhunt for Mahdi. The Federal Bureau of Investigation (FBI) dispatched FBI agents to search for Mahdi. Similarly, the police in North Carolina issued a warrant of arrest for Mahdi after closed-circuit television (CCTV) showed him to be the killer who had robbed and shot Christopher Boggs. The Virginia authorities likewise issued an arrest warrant for Mahdi after linking him to the murder of Greg Jones, and Mahdi reportedly confessed to killing Jones.

On July 21, 2004, local police spotted Mahdi driving Myers's truck in Florida and cornered him in Satellite Beach. Although Mahdi abandoned the truck, fled on foot, and even carried Myers's stolen rifle with him, he eventually dropped the rifle and surrendered to police.

After the arrest of Mahdi, local authorities in Florida extradited Mahdi to South Carolina for investigation into the murder of Myers, with which he was charged in court. State prosecutors in South Carolina reportedly sought the death penalty in preliminary charge sheets filed against Mahdi, at the request of Myers's family, Orangeburg County authorities (of which Myers was an employee), and Calhoun County authorities (where the murder took place).

== Murder trials (2006–2011) ==
From 2006 to 2011, Mahdi was tried in South Carolina and North Carolina for the murders of James Myers and Christopher Boggs, respectively. Mahdi was not prosecuted in Virginia for the murder of Greg Jones because Virginia authorities determined that the strong evidence in the Carolinas murders would likely have resulted in the death penalty in one or both of those states. (Note: Before the Commonwealth of Virginia abolished capital punishment in 2021, those found guilty of murder under certain circumstances could face the death penalty in Virginia.)

=== South Carolina ===
On August 23, 2004, a Calhoun County, grand jury indicted Mahdi on one count each of murder, second-degree burglary, and grand larceny. On September 3, 2004, First Circuit (Calhoun, Orangeburg, Dorchester Counties) Solicitor Robby Robbins announced his intent to seek the death penalty against Mahdi, who purportedly remained expressionless when the prosecution filed the seek notice in court. Under South Carolina state law, an offense of murder carries either the death penalty or life imprisonment without the possibility of parole.

Originally, Mahdi was scheduled to stand trial on January 23, 2006, but it was postponed through his lawyers' application. Mahdi's trial eventually took place in November 2006. The first three days of trial were spent on jury selection. At one point, Mahdi was discovered to have a homemade handcuff key in his pocket during a routine court search before his trial, which he had brought from his prison cell to the courtroom. As a result, tighter security measures were undertaken to monitor Mahdi throughout the rest of the proceedings.

On November 28, 2006, the fourth day of his trial, right before the jury was set for its first day of case hearing, Mahdi expressed his intent to plead guilty to all charges, and as a result of his plea of guilt, Mahdi was thereby convicted and his sentencing left up to the discretion of the judge.

The prosecution, led by David Pascoe, who defeated Robbins in November 2004, continued to argue for the death penalty for Mahdi, citing "hate and malice" in Mahdi's heart and Mahdi's abhorrent actions of murdering a police officer and burning the corpse thereafter, as well as his prior criminal history and other aggravating factors of the crime, which demonstrated Mahdi's disregard for human life and his status as an epitome of evil. It was revealed in court that at one point in 1998, Mahdi, then 15, pledged to kill a police officer when he was arrested at the end of a nine-hour standoff, which seemingly became fulfilled with the death of Myers. Myers's widow, then 38 years old, testified that her heart died the moment her husband was murdered, that she had not been the same person since, and that her husband was killed in the very same shed that had served as the backdrop for the couple's wedding in 2003, which deepened her heartbreak.

The defense sought a life sentence for Mahdi, stating that their client had had a troubled childhood, that he had been raised without a mother, that his father had neglected both Mahdi and his older brother as they grew up, and that he himself had been a victim of circumstances that led to his going astray and shaped him to be a criminal. The defense submitted that the mitigating circumstances of Mahdi's case warranted judicial mercy on humanitarian grounds.

On December 8, 2006, Justice Clifton Newman sentenced Mahdi to death for murdering Myers. Newman claimed that Mahdi lacked remorse for the murder, pointing out that Mahdi had pled guilty only after a homemade handcuff key was discovered in his pocket before the trial, that Mahdi had committed other misbehaviors, including threatening law enforcement officers, all of which proved that Mahdi would not adapt or conform to prison life. Justice Newman additionally stated that in the balance between justice and mercy, he always tried to discover any shred of humanity within the criminals he judged but in this case found that no sense of humanity existed in Mahdi. Before he passed the death sentence, Justice Newman quoted:

In extinguishing the life, hope and dreams of Captain Myers in such a wicked, depraved and conscienceless manner, the defendant Mikal Deen Mahdi also extinguished any justifiable claim to receive the mercy he seeks from this Court.

In addition to the death sentence, Mahdi also received consecutive jail terms of 15 years and 10 years for second-degree burglary and grand larceny, respectively. At the age of 23, Mahdi was reportedly the youngest person to be sentenced to death in South Carolina. This case was one of Newman's most notable cases as a judge. Newman commented on the case of Mahdi in later years, admitting that it had been a difficult decision to sentence Mahdi to death, because he himself was an opponent of capital punishment.

=== North Carolina ===
Mahdi was charged by the state authorities of North Carolina with the murder of Christopher Boggs in July 2004. (Note: Under the state law of North Carolina, the offence of first-degree murder is punishable by the death penalty or life imprisonment.)

In December 2011, Mahdi was extradited to North Carolina to stand trial for the murder of Boggs. Mahdi pled guilty to one count of first-degree murder and was sentenced to life without parole by Judge Richard Stone. Boggs's mother was present in court to witness the sentencing of Mahdi.

Given that Mahdi was already on death row in South Carolina for the killing of Myers, he was sent back to South Carolina to continue serving his sentence for crimes committed there.

== Stabbing incident in prison ==
2009 mug shot of Mahdi

On the morning of December 2, 2009, the third year of his incarceration on death row at the Lieber Correctional Institution, Mahdi and condemned serial killer Quincy Allen plotted to attack and kill a corrections officer.

As part of their plan, Mahdi and Allen had removed metal strips from air ducts and made makeshift knives. They approached a prison officer named Nathan Sasser, asking him if they could visit the basketball court. After Sasser escorted the pair to the basketball court, Mahdi and Allen attacked Sasser, stabbing him multiple times before attempting to escape by climbing through the fence. The escape attempt failed after other prison staff subdued the pair by firing tear gas and rubber bullets.

Sasser survived the stabbing after treatment at the Medical University of South Carolina, but he developed PTSD and began suffering from anxiety attacks, which later led to his dismissal from his job. Allen and Mahdi were stripped of their privileges—including outside recreation, visitation, phone use, and canteen items—and charged with assault, but since both men were already sentenced to death, the prosecution subsequently dropped the charges.

In 2022, Allen's death sentence was overturned by a federal appellate court; on July 23, 2024, Allen was resentenced to life imprisonment after he reached a plea deal with the prosecution and agreed to waive his right to further appeals.

== Appeal process ==
=== State appeals ===
On June 15, 2009, the South Carolina Supreme Court unanimously dismissed Mahdi's direct appeal against his death sentence. In a unanimous opinion written by Justice Costa M. Pleicones, the court rejected Mahdi's arguments that he had been punitively given the death penalty due to his changing his mind and pleading guilty right after exercising his right to a jury trial, and the judges agreed that Mahdi had been sentenced to death fairly in view of the aggravating circumstances surrounding his case.

In a concurring opinion, Chief Justice Jean H. Toal observed that Mahdi was among the most deserving of the death penalty she had seen during her two decades of service as a judge. She stated:

I recite these facts to emphasize the egregious nature of (Mahdi)'s crimes. In my time on this Court, I have seen few cases where the extraordinary penalty of death was so deserved.

=== Federal appeals ===
On February 20, 2017, the U.S. Supreme Court rejected Mahdi's appeal against his death sentence.

On December 5, 2017, U.S. District Judge Timothy M. Cain of the U.S. District Court for the District of South Carolina dismissed Mahdi's appeal against his death sentence.

On September 25, 2018, District Judge Cain once again rejected Mahdi's second appeal.

On December 20, 2021, the 4th Circuit Court of Appeals rejected Mahdi's follow-up appeal for review of his case.

On January 9, 2023, Mahdi's final appeal was denied by the U.S. Supreme Court, therefore confirming his death sentence for the murder of James Myers.

=== Lawsuit against state execution policies ===
In 2023, Mahdi was one of several death row inmates who filed a lawsuit against the state of South Carolina over the introduction of firing squad and electric chair as alternative execution methods in the state. The inmates argued that use of the electric chair and firing squad were unconstitutional because they could cause unnecessary pain and suffering to the condemned, and therefore amounted to cruel and unusual punishments. The state, however, responded that both the electric chair and firing squad were in line with current legal protocols and that no law decreed that death had to be instantaneous or painless for individuals facing the death penalty.

At that time, South Carolina had an unofficial moratorium on executions after the state's last execution in 2011 due to the absence of lethal injection drugs, which arose from expiration of the state's existing drug supplies and refusal by many drug companies to sell their drugs to the state for executions. As a result of the state's inability to conduct further lethal injection executions, lawmakers in South Carolina passed new laws to reintroduce the electric chair and legalize firing-squad executions as alternative execution methods for future cases in which the option of lethal injection was unavailable. Eventually, the state successfully procured new drugs in September 2023 to restart executions by lethal injection.

On July 31, 2024, the five-judge South Carolina Supreme Court dismissed the lawsuit and affirmed the constitutionality of both the electric chair and firing squad, with a majority of the judges expressing support of the two methods: three for firing squad and four for the electric chair. That decision gave rise to the possibility of resuming executions in South Carolina for all 32 inmates on the state's death row, including Mahdi. At the time of that ruling, five condemned inmates—Mahdi, Freddie Eugene Owens, Richard Bernard Moore, Brad Sigmon, and Marion Bowman Jr.—had exhausted all avenues of appeal and hence were in line for imminent execution on dates to be determined.

Eventually, the 13-year moratorium in South Carolina ended on September 20, 2024, after one of the five inmates, Freddie Eugene Owens, was put to death for the murder of a convenience store clerk in 1997. Richard Moore later became the second condemned inmate to die, on November 1, 2024.

== Execution ==
=== Court execution order and stay ===
After the loss of his legal motion in 2024, Mikal Mahdi remained on death row for murdering James Myers until his execution in 2025.

On August 28, 2024, a court order was issued to allow the state to carry out a total of six executions during the course of the following year, with each execution set to take place every 35 days (equivalent to five weeks) apart from each other.

Mahdi was one of the six condemned prisoners on the list. The five other inmates on the list were Freddie Eugene Owens, Richard Bernard Moore, Marion Bowman Jr., Steven Bixby, and Brad Sigmon. Owens and Moore, who were sentenced to death in 1999 and 2001 respectively, were the first two of the six to be put to death, on September 20 and November 1, 2024. After the executions of those two, Bowman, who had been convicted and sentenced in May 2002 for the 2001 arson-murder of a woman, was supposed to receive his execution date on November 8, 2024, which would be, tentatively, December 6, 2024. However, Bowman's death warrant did not come as scheduled, because prior to this, Bowman and the remaining three condemned prisoners, which included Mahdi, on the execution schedule list had appealed to the South Carolina Supreme Court, asking that their executions not take place until the end of the winter holiday period—specifically, after Christmas and New Year's Day. Although the state responded to the motion by substantiating that it was not unusual for the state to carry out executions during winter holidays, including five from December 4, 1998, to January 8, 1999, the lawyers representing the four death row inmates submitted a statement in court that said, "Six consecutive executions with virtually no respite will take a substantial toll on all involved, particularly during a time of year that is so important to families."

On November 14, 2024, the South Carolina Supreme Court granted the inmates a temporary respite and agreed to not sign any new death warrants until at least January 3, 2025. That court outcome allowed Mahdi and the three other inmates facing imminent execution to have their execution orders pushed back to 2025. Bowman and Sigmon, whose death sentences had been imposed earlier than Mahdi's, were executed as scheduled, on January 31, 2025, and March 7, 2025, respectively.

=== Death warrant in 2025 ===
On March 14, 2025, a week after Sigmon was executed by firing squad, Mahdi's death warrant was formally signed by the South Carolina Supreme Court, and his death sentence was scheduled to be carried out on April 11, 2025. Mahdi was given until March 28, 2025, to choose his preferred method of execution, with the options of lethal injection, electrocution, or firing squad. If Mahdi failed to make a decision by the deadline, the execution would be carried out by electrocution by default.

Mahdi was the fifth and last inmate listed on the court order to have his execution date scheduled. Steven Bixby, who received his death sentence in 2007, was originally the sixth and final inmate slated to receive an execution date in May after Mahdi, but the South Carolina Supreme Court granted Bixby an indefinite stay of execution via a 3–2 decision that resulted in a scheduled April 4, 2025, mental competency hearing to assess whether he was mentally competent to be executed, with a second hearing tentatively set for August 2025.

On March 28, 2025, Mahdi elected to be put to death by firing squad, therefore becoming the second condemned inmate in South Carolina since 2025 to choose that method. According to his lawyer, Mahdi did not choose the electric chair or lethal injection because he feared dying a "burned and mutilated" death in the electric chair or a lingering, prolonged death while strapped to the lethal injection gurney, and hence he selected firing squad as the least of all "three evils" (referring to South Carolina's execution methods), as quoted by Mahdi's lawyer.

=== Final appeals ===
On March 18, 2025, Mahdi appealed to the South Carolina Supreme Court to stave off his execution, claiming that he had been represented by ineffective trial counsel who had not done enough to provide mitigating factors that would have helped him avoid the death sentence in his original trial and that that factor included further details of Mahdi's childhood that his trial lawyers had allegedly failed to uncover. The state prosecutors responded that Mahdi's difficult childhood would not have legal bearing in his case, adding that Mahdi was connected to a long history of violent incidents, which undermined any mitigating value in his case.

On April 7, 2025, Mahdi's appeal was denied by the South Carolina Supreme Court. The court's five judges unanimously rejected Mahdi's grounds of appeal, stating that the previous court hearings had rejected similar arguments from Mahdi and adding that the trial judge had considered the long history of violence committed by Mahdi before sentencing him to death. The final avenue of appeal Mahdi had left was either a last appeal to the U.S. Supreme Court or a petition for clemency from South Carolina governor Henry McMaster.

While Mahdi was appealing his death sentence, Mahdi's aunt and former teacher pleaded for mercy, stating that Mahdi had had a painful and traumatic childhood and hoped for judicial mercy to be exercised on him.

After losing appeal to the South Carolina Supreme Court, Mahdi's lawyers appealed to the U.S. Supreme Court, which denied relief on April 11, 2025, hours before Mahdi’s scheduled execution. Minutes before the execution, Governor McMaster announced that he would not grant clemency to Mahdi and allowed the execution to move forward.

=== Response ===
In response to the upcoming execution of Mahdi, James Myers's daughter and only child stated that she had forgiven Mahdi and chose to not witness his execution, but she hoped to leave the painful past behind once Mahdi was executed, and instead focus on the positive memories and emotions associated with her father, whom she described as a man with "wisdom beyond his years". Myers's daughter, who was married with one daughter when her father was murdered back in 2004, stated that Mahdi's difficult childhood was no excuse for the horrific crimes he committed and she lamented that her father never got to meet her three younger daughters (who were born after the murder of Myers). Nathan Sasser, the former prison guard who was attacked and stabbed by Mahdi and Quincy Allen in 2009, stated that he still struggled with working, socializing and enjoying life due to the trauma he sustained from the stabbing, but he hoped for closure to others affected by Mahdi's actions. Calhoun County Sheriff Thomas Summers, who was in his first term when Myers was killed, described Mahdi as "evil" and intended to attend the execution.

=== Firing squad execution ===
On April 11, 2025, 42-year-old Mikal Deen Mahdi was put to death by firing squad in the Broad River Correctional Institution. The firing squad fired at 6:01 pm, and according to a media witness, Mahdi reportedly cried out when he was first shot, and he flexed his arms and groaned twice during the first 45 seconds after the bullets were fired, and he made a few gasps for air for about 80 seconds before he fell motionless. An attending physician pronounced Mahdi dead at 6:05 p.m., fewer than four minutes after the shots were fired.

An autopsy of Mahdi’s body revealed that of the three shots fired, only two impacted him, and neither of them hit his heart. Medical experts said that this is why Mahdi screamed when he was shot, and why he remained conscious for over a minute afterward.

Mahdi did not make a final statement. Prior to his execution, Mahdi ate a last meal of ribeye steak cooked medium, mushroom risotto, broccoli, collard greens, cheesecake and sweet tea.

Mahdi was the fifth person executed in South Carolina after the state ended its 13-year moratorium on capital punishment in 2024. He was also the second individual in the state—and the fifth in the United States since 1976—to be executed by firing squad.

Mahdi's lawyer David Weiss, who was among the witnesses of the execution, criticised the execution of Mahdi, claiming that it was "barbaric" and "a horrifying act that belongs in the darkest chapters of history, not in a civilized society." Other witnesses also include journalists Brian McConchie of The National News Desk and Martha Rose Brown of Lee Enterprises (of media in the area where Myers served as a policeman) and Jeffrey Collins of the Associated Press along with Calhoun County Sheriff Thomas Summers (where the crime occurred) and an unidentified member of Myers's family.

== See also ==
- List of people executed in South Carolina
- List of people executed in the United States in 2025

Executions by firing squad in the United States
Preceded by Brad Sigmon – South Carolina March 7, 2025	Mikal Mahdi – South Carolina; April 11, 2025	Succeeded by Stephen Corey Bryant – South Carolina November 14, 2025
Executions carried out in South Carolina
Preceded by Brad Sigmon March 7, 2025	Mikal Mahdi; April 11, 2025	Succeeded by Stephen Stanko June 13, 2025
Executions carried out in the United States
Preceded by Michael Tanzi – Florida April 8, 2025	Mikal Mahdi – South Carolina; April 11, 2025	Succeeded by Moises Mendoza – Texas April 23, 2025
