= Souers =

Souers is a surname. Notable people with this surname include:

- Jerome Souers (born 1958), American football coach
- Sidney Souers (1892–1973), American admiral and intelligence expert
- Tiffany Souers, American murder victim
