= Stephen Stanko =

Executed American convicted murderer (1968–2025)

- Stanko in 2023
- Born: January 13, 1968; Guantanamo Bay Naval Base
- Died: June 13, 2025 (aged 57); Broad River Correctional Institution, South Carolina, U.S.
- Status: Executed by lethal injection
- Convictions: Murder (2 counts); Kidnapping (3 counts); First degree criminal sexual conduct Assault and battery with intent to kill Assault; Armed robbery (3 counts)
- Penalty: Death (murder); 110 years (criminal sexual conduct, kidnapping and armed robbery in assaulting Ling's daughter during the murder of Ling)

Details
- Victims: 2
- Date: April 8, 2005
- State: South Carolina
- Locations: Murrell's Inlet and Conway
- Imprisoned at: Broad River Correctional Institution

Stephen Christopher Stanko (January 13, 1968 – June 13, 2025) was an American prisoner who was convicted of the 2005 murders of two people in South Carolina, as well as the kidnapping and rape of the teenage daughter of one of his murder victims. He was executed for his crimes on June 13, 2025.

== Prior to the murders ==
Stanko was born at Guantanamo Bay Naval Base on January 13, 1968. Before his murder conviction, Stanko had been incarcerated for assault and kidnapping in 1996. Stanko was released from prison in 2004 after serving 8½ years of a 10-year sentence. While in prison, he co-authored Living in Prison: A History of the Correctional System With an Insider's View. (The book was written during his first incarceration.)

Stanko has been described as "a highly intelligent, polished ex-convict who didn't mind talking about his life in prison or the book he'd written about it."

After his release in 2004, Stanko moved to Myrtle Beach, renting a room for almost a year. His parole officer visited the home to ensure his landlady was aware of his background, which he had disclosed when applying for the rental. His relationship with his landlady was uneventful other than his occasionally being late with the rent. He often complained about his difficulty getting a job because of his background, although he had one or two brief employments. He abruptly moved out after almost a year, moving to a friend's home in exchange for keeping an eye on her elderly mother.

== Murders ==
About one year after being released from prison, Stanko began doing library research, supposedly for a second book. While doing this research, he befriended librarian Laura Ling and eventually moved in with her and her daughter. He also had developed a seemingly friendly relationship with a library patron, Henry Turner.

On April 8, 2005, Stanko strangled Laura Ling (43), shot Henry Lee Turner (74) dead, and sexually assaulted and slit the throat of Ling's teenage daughter, who survived and made the 911 call for help. He was convicted of these charges after trials in which an insanity defense was used.

Articles on Jeffrey Dahmer, Gary Ridgway, and other serial killers were found in Stanko's home. According to a police spokesperson: "He either was just interested in serial killers, or he was becoming a serial killer."

After a nationwide manhunt, based on tips received after the posting of a $10,000 reward for information leading to his capture, Stanko was arrested without incident by the U.S. Marshals Service in Augusta, Georgia on April 12, 2005, as he was able to hide discreetly around the Augusta area during the 2005 Masters Tournament.

On August 18, 2006, a Georgetown County jury convicted Stanko and sentenced him to death for the murder of Ling, and 110 years in prison for criminal sexual conduct, kidnapping and armed robbery in the related assault of Ling's daughter. In November 2009, Stanko was convicted of murder in the Turner trial. That led to his second death sentence, this time by a Horry County jury.

== Death warrant and execution ==
Stephen Stanko was on death row at Broad River Correctional Institution in Columbia, South Carolina. He is the first person to be sentenced to death in Georgetown County in nearly 11 years.

The first phase of Stanko's appeals process began on September 23, 2007, when he appeared before the South Carolina Supreme Court in a bid to overturn his death penalty conviction in the Laura Ling case. His attorney said that errors in the original trial resulted in his conviction in that the trial judge did not allow the defense to ask potential jurors how they felt about the insanity defense and did not allow the defense to present Stanko's age/mentality as aggravating or mitigating factors. However, the conviction and sentence were affirmed.

In February 2013, Stanko lost his appeal in the Henry Turner murder case; the South Carolina Supreme Court affirmed Stanko's conviction and sentence.

In 2015, there was a post-conviction relief (PCR) hearing. The court heard testimony from Bill Diggs, Stanko's trial attorney, that Stanko suffered from a brain defect. On May 24, 2016, the court reaffirmed his conviction.

=== Death warrant ===
On May 5, 2025, his petition to the United States Supreme Court was denied. According to Fifteenth Circuit Solicitor Jimmy A. Richardson II, his appeals for murdering Turner were exhausted, thereby allowing the South Carolina Supreme Court to issue an execution notice. Customarily, the execution notices are issued on Fridays since the execution is set on the fourth Friday since when the notice is received; thereby maximizing the amount of time for potential pre-execution litigation. Stanko then received a June 13, 2025 execution date, which was issued on May 16, the first available Friday after his appeals were exhausted, since on Friday, May 9, the state Supreme Court was closed in observance of Confederate Memorial Day, a state holiday in South Carolina. Stanko had until May 30 to select a method of execution, with the states available options being electric chair, lethal injection, or firing squad. If he declined to choose a method, the electric chair would have been chosen by default.

In response to the scheduled execution of Stanko, Roger Turner, whose father was murdered by Stanko, stated that he was willing to attend the execution, which he believed should have been completed many years ago, and recalled his father as a jolly and kind-hearted man, who was also a loving father to his children.

After receiving his execution date, Stanko requested that the state reveal more information about its protocols for lethal injection and firing squad. Stanko stated that he had been leaning towards choosing the firing squad until details of the execution of Mikal Mahdi were published. The Supreme Court of South Carolina rejected Stanko's request on May 29.

On May 30, Stanko chose to be executed by lethal injection.

Stanko was one of four inmates scheduled to be executed across four different states in the U.S. over a four-day period between June 10 and June 13, 2025.

Stanko was executed on June 13, 2025, by lethal injection at the Broad River Correctional Institution. He was pronounced dead at 6:34 pm. Prior to his execution, Stanko ate a last meal of fried fish, fried shrimp, crab cakes, a baked potato, carrots, fried okra, cherry pie, banana pudding and sweet tea. For his last words, Stanko's lawyer read out a lengthy final statement in which he asked his surviving victim and the victims' families for forgiveness.

== See also ==
- Capital punishment in South Carolina
- List of people executed in South Carolina
- List of people executed in the United States in 2025

Executions carried out in South Carolina
| Preceded by Mikal Mahdi April 11, 2025 | Stephen Stanko; June 13, 2025 | Succeeded by Stephen Corey Bryant November 14, 2025 |
Executions carried out in the United States
| Preceded by John Hanson – Oklahoma June 12, 2025 | Stephen Stanko – South Carolina; June 13, 2025 | Succeeded by Thomas Gudinas – Florida June 24, 2025 |
