= Freddie Eugene Owens =

American killer executed for a 1997 murder case

- Owens's mugshot
- Born: March 18, 1978; South Carolina, U.S.
- Died: September 20, 2024 (aged 46); Broad River Correctional Institution, South Carolina, U.S.
- Cause of death: Execution by lethal injection
- Convictions: Murder (1 count); Robbery; Criminal use of firearms; Conspiracy to commit armed robbery
- Penalty: Death (murder); 30 years' imprisonment (robbery; vacated); Five years' imprisonment (firearm use; vacated); Five years' imprisonment (conspiracy to commit robbery; vacated)

Details
- Victims: Irene Grainger Graves, 41; Christopher Bryan Lee, 28
- Date: November 1, 1997 and February 16, 1999
- Location: Greenville County, South Carolina

Freddie Eugene Owens (March 18, 1978 – September 20, 2024), alias Khalil Divine Black Sun Allah, was an American man convicted and executed in South Carolina for the 1997 killing of Irene Grainger Graves, a convenience store clerk. Owens was 19 when he and an 18-year-old accomplice killed Graves during a robbery in November 1997.

While the accomplice pleaded guilty and was later jailed for voluntary manslaughter, Owens was found guilty of murder and sentenced to death in 1999. The death sentence was overturned twice before re-sentencing trials restored the death penalty for Owens, which was subsequently upheld by the higher courts. Owens was also charged with murdering Christopher Bryan Lee, a fellow prisoner, in 1999.

Owens was executed on September 20, 2024. He was the first person in South Carolina to be executed after the state's 13-year moratorium on executions.

== Personal life ==
Born in South Carolina on March 18, 1978, Freddie Eugene Owens, whose mother was 18 when she gave birth to him, was placed under foster care at the age of five, and he reportedly experienced abuse and neglect from his family. He was eventually returned to his biological mother, who married another man after separating from his birth father, who was abusive towards his wife and children. Owens and his three siblings were abused by both their biological parents and their step father. According to court records, throughout his childhood his father and step father were in and out of prison.

As a teen, Owens spent time in the states Juvy system, where other teens abused him sexually and physically. He dropped out of ninth grade after repeating several grades and often got into fights. At some point during these years, Owens experienced damage to his frontal lobe. This caused him to experience violent outbursts, anxiety, depression, paranoia and seizures.

Throughout his 25 years in prison, Owens took interest in history. He studied African history, rambling facts about the University of Timbuktu, bonobo apes, and the cartoon character Betty Boop. He also went on to learn how to read and write in Arabic, strengthening his islamic faith.

== First murder case and trial ==
On November 1, 1997, in Greenville, Owens and his three friends – Lester Young, Nakeo Vance and Steven Andra Golden – went outdoors together with the intention to commit armed robbery.

While Young and Vance were in another location, Golden and Owens barged into a convenience store and held the store's female clerk at gunpoint. According to Golden, who testified in Owens's murder trial, Owens gunned down the 41-year-old clerk, Irene Grainger Graves (April 6, 1956 – November 1, 1997), after she failed to open the safe, and she died of a gunshot wound to the head. Golden and Owens fled the scene with $37.29 from the cash register and met up with Vance and Young, who were later told that a woman was shot by Owens during a robbery attempt. At the time of her death, Graves was a single mother with two sons and one daughter.

Owens was arrested on November 11, 1997, and together with 18-year-old Golden, was charged with murder. Golden made a plea bargain with the prosecution, who agreed to have the murder charge and death penalty taken off the table. Golden was found guilty of voluntary manslaughter and sentenced to 28 years in prison. Young and Vance were also charged in connection with the crime but the outcomes of their cases were unknown.

On February 8, 1999, Owens stood trial before a jury at a Greenville County trial court for charges of murder, armed robbery, criminal use of firearms, and conspiracy to commit armed robbery. Owens reportedly denied murdering Graves and protested his innocence in spite of Golden's testimony that Owens killed Graves during the robbery. Later sources revealed that the CCTV captured two men - Owens in a ski mask and Golden in a stocking mask - entering the store. The man wearing the ski mask (Owens) is seen shooting and killing Graves.

On February 15, 1999, the jury found Owens guilty of all charges, and his sentencing trial was scheduled to take place two days later.

== Prison killing and sentencing ==
Less than 12 hours after he was convicted of the murder of Irene Graves, on February 16, 1999, Freddie Owens killed a fellow prisoner while he was in prison. The victim was identified as 28-year-old Christopher Bryan Lee, who was serving a 90-day jail term for a traffic offense.

On February 17, 1999, a day after the murder of Lee, Owens at his sentencing hearing, made a full confession inside the courtroom and recounted how he murdered Lee inside the prison cell he shared with Lee and ten other inmates. Allegedly, Lee taunted Owens about his conviction and even bragged to Owens that his cousin was one of the jurors. Enraged at this, Owens attacked Lee. He struck him in the face, used a ballpoint pen to stab his eye and throat, he repeatedly strangled him with a sheet. Owens ended the assault by bashing Lee's head and burning his eyes and hair with a cigarette lighter and also suffocating Lee by forcibly closing the left nostril and shoving a pen inside the right nostril. Lee died as a result, and Owens, who maintained his innocence, stated he did so because he was falsely accused. Lee's bereaved family called for an official probe into the death of Lee.

After Owens made the confession, the prosecution and defense made their final submissions on the sentence. Although the defense implored the jury to show mercy on account of Owens's troubled childhood and psychiatric condition, the prosecution argued in rebuttal that the confession and circumstances of Graves's murder demonstrated that Owens was a violent and hot-blooded killer who posed a menace to society. They also brought to the jury's attention the tragic consequences Graves's death brought upon her family, including the fact that her three children were left orphaned and had to be sent away to their grandmother's care. They argued that, no matter how terrible the circumstances of Owens's background, they did not excuse his abhorrent actions and murderous behavior, and that he should assume full responsibility for what he did. For this, the prosecution sought the death penalty for Owens.

On that same day, the jury returned with their verdict, sentencing Owens to death for the murder of Graves. For the other charges of robbery, criminal use of firearms, and conspiracy to commit armed robbery, Owens received additional jail terms of 30 years, five years and five years respectively.

After he was sentenced for murdering Graves, Owens and a 19-year-old man named Fred Walker Jr. – who was alleged to be Owens's accomplice in the prison killing – were both charged with the murder of Lee. Subsequently, the second murder charge against Owens was withdrawn in 2019 around the time he exhausted all his appeals against the death sentence.

== Appeals and re-sentencing bids ==
On September 4, 2001, Freddie Owens appealed to the South Carolina Supreme Court against his conviction and sentence. Although the Supreme Court affirmed his convictions for murdering Graves and the robberies, the court vacated his death sentence and multiple jail terms for the case itself, and Owens was granted a re-sentencing trial due to procedural errors behind his original sentencing trial.

On February 17, 2003, Owens was once again sentenced to death. Circuit Judge John Kittredge opined that due to the brutality of the murder and other instances of violent behavior in prison, it reflected that Owens had a "total and utter disregard for the rights and safety of others" and his case was the "worst of the worst" that made the death penalty the only appropriate sentence for him.

On November 20, 2004, a year after the death sentence was restored in his case, Owens was once again granted a second re-sentencing trial after his appeal was allowed by the South Carolina Supreme Court, after it ruled that there were trial errors in his first re-sentencing trial.

The second re-sentencing trial, which was held before a jury, took place in 2006, and for the third time, Owens was sentenced to death. Owens did not receive any prison sentence for the firearm-related charges, as South Carolina law forbids sentencing a convict for firearm offenses if the convict was given the death penalty or life imprisonment without the possibility of parole.

Although Owens appealed against his third death sentence, the South Carolina Supreme Court rejected his appeal and upheld the death sentence on July 14, 2008. The court unanimously ruled that the prosecution did not breach their duties to a fair trial for Owens when they presented evidence of Owens's disciplinary issues in prison prior to his sentencing. Examples of his misbehavior included setting fires in his cell, sexual misconduct, using vulgar language, as well as past incidents of Owens stabbing a guard and a prisoner and possessing at least seven home-made knives.

== Death row ==
=== Conversion to Islam and cancelled execution attempts ===
While the legal process was ongoing in his case, Freddie Owens remained on death row at Broad River Correctional Institution while awaiting his execution. In 2015, Owens converted to Islam and he went by the Muslim name Khalil Divine Black Sun Allah, although he continued using his original name in court proceedings for clarity.

Additionally, Owens also took an interest in history, especially African history. Owens had suggested that his niece write a paper about the Nubian Queen Amanirenas, who resisted Roman rule in the ancient Kingdom of Kush. Regularly, Owens would converse with his lawyers about the University of Timbuktu, bonobo apes, and the history of cartoon character Betty Boop. Owens took up writing in prison; he often penned essays, poems and his own personal thoughts, and also learned to read and write Arabic as part of his further devotion to his newfound Islamic faith.

Originally, Owens's death sentence was ordered to be carried out on October 3, 2008, but the execution did not proceed due to the U.S. Supreme Court granting a stay of execution for Owens while pending an appeal. Later, Owens was rescheduled to be executed on January 9, 2009, but the execution date was delayed for legal reasons. Twelve years later, a third death warrant was approved, rescheduling Owens's new execution date as June 25, 2021, but it was again ultimately staved off due to Owens's last-minute appeal and the South Carolina Supreme Court ruled that the executions of Owens and another inmate, Brad Sigmon, should be postponed until they were given the choice of death by electrocution or firing squad.

At the time of Owens's third death warrant, there was an unofficial moratorium on executions in South Carolina since 2011 due to lack of supplies of drugs used for lethal injection executions, in addition to the expiration of the existing drug supplies and refusal of drug companies to sell their drugs to the state for the purpose of carrying out executions. Prior to 2024, 43 convicted murderers were executed in South Carolina between 1985 and 2011; Jeffrey Motts was the most recent person at that point to be executed, with his execution taking place on May 6, 2011, for the murder of his cellmate at Perry Correctional Institution (where Motts was serving a life sentence for murdering his great-aunt and her brother-in-law in 1995).

In 2021, ten years after the state's last execution, the South Carolina state governor, Henry McMaster, signed new laws to revive the electric chair and introduce execution by firing squad as alternative methods should the option of lethal injection be unavailable, and to allow inmates to choose whichever execution method they preferred. In September 2023, it was reported that the state had managed to purchase drugs to restart executions by lethal injection.

=== Legal challenge against execution protocols ===
In 2023, Owens was one of the several death row inmates who filed a lawsuit to the courts of South Carolina, seeking to ban the use of firing squad and electrocution on the grounds that they were cruel and unusual punishments and would cause unnecessary pain and suffering to the condemned. The state's legal representatives submitted that the execution methods fit the existing protocols and the law did not require that death be instantaneous or painless.

On July 31, 2024, a five-judge panel of the South Carolina Supreme Court issued its final ruling, declaring that both electrocution and firing squad were legal. Both methods were approved by a majority of the judges (three for firing squad and four for the electric chair), which paved the way for the potential resumption of executions for all the 32 inmates on the state's death row, including Owens. At the time of this ruling, Owens and four others death row inmates – Marion Bowman Jr., Richard Bernard Moore, Brad Sigmon and Mikal Mahdi – had exhausted all avenues of appeal and were identified as the most likely candidates to be scheduled for execution following this verdict.

=== Fourth death warrant ===
On August 23, 2024, less than a month after the Supreme Court's ruling, the death warrant of Owens was issued and his execution was expected to be carried out on September 20, 2024, making him the first person in South Carolina scheduled to be executed in 13 years.

Owens was given a chance to select which of the three execution methods he preferred for his death sentence to be carried out, and the deadline was on September 6, 2024. Should Owens not make a choice between electrocution, firing squad or lethal injection, his death sentence would be carried out by the default method of the electric chair. Corrections Director Bryan Stirling stated that all the methods were available: the drugs were pure and ready for use, the electric chair had been tested and found problem-free, and a firing squad had the ammunition and training to carry out executions.

Apart from this, a court order was issued to allow the state to carry out another five executions after Owens, with a five-week interval set in place between each execution, overruling the inmates' request for a 13-week gap between each execution listed in the order. After Owens, the five inmates next slated for execution were: Steven Bixby, Richard Moore, Brad Sigmon, Marion Bowman Jr. and Mikal Mahdi.

Owens chose to not personally select any execution methods to facilitate his upcoming execution, and instead, he wanted to give one of his lawyers the power of attorney to choose the method of execution for him. Explaining why he made this decision, Owens said he was a Muslim and in Islam, it was a sin to commit suicide and letting Owens choose the way he preferred to die was akin to a form of suicide, and he thus abstained from making his choice for religious reasons. He also confirmed he did not want to die by electrocution. The South Carolina Supreme Court granted his request on September 4, 2024, and allowed Owens's counsel to make the choice on his behalf.

On September 6, 2024, Owens's lawyer, Emily Paavola, confirmed that she selected lethal injection for her client. Paavola explained her decision in a statement, "I have known Mr. Owens for 15 years. Under the circumstances, and in light of the information currently available to me, I made the best decision I felt I could make on his behalf."

==== Victim's family's response ====
In response to the death warrant of Owens, Sherry Brooks, the sister of his second victim Christopher Bryan Lee, told The Post and Courier that the family had waited for justice to be served and it was time for Owens to die for having killed her brother "for a lack of better words".

As for Graves's family, The Post and Courier was unable to contact them for the article featuring Brooks's statement. However, when The Atlanta News First affiliate in the Greenville area interviewed Ensley Graves-Lee (Graves's daughter and youngest child) for their news broadcast, she noted:

I think I've kind of taken on the we're going to get it done after you do the horror thing, which was to make it to the funeral, or to make it to a custody that [sic], or to make it to a courthouse to meet the person who's done this thing. I think you just approach it as you just gotta get it done.

On the eve of Owens's scheduled execution, Graves's oldest son Arte Graves, who was 18 and a college student at the time of his mother's murder, agreed to be interviewed. He stated that his mother was a hardworking person and loving parent to her children and he and both his younger brother and sister missed their mother a lot since the night Owens murdered her. Arte stated that at the time of his mother's murder he had recently moved to Delaware for college, and it prompted him to return to South Carolina to support his younger siblings. Arte, a real estate agent and small business owner in Rock Hill, stated he wanted to attend the execution of Owens, viewing it as a moment to find small but true closure to the painful chapter of losing his mother. Similarly, Ensley Graves-Lee, who was ten years old at the time of her mother's death and is now a speech pathologist and children's literacy advocate, told The Guardian that the recent media attention on her mother's murder took an emotional toll on the family and that she wanted her mother to be remembered as a loving parent to her children. She hated that her mother was absent from her life and lamented that she had never gotten to be a grandmother to her grandchildren.

=== Final appeals ===
==== Dispute of Golden's testimony and information of execution drugs ====
On August 30, 2024, Owens's lawyers appealed for the case to be reopened. They argued that there was new evidence concerning Steven Golden, the accomplice of Owens who pleaded guilty and turned state evidence against him. Although Golden's plea agreement did not carry the condition to take the death penalty or life imprisonment off the table, Golden signed an affidavit a day before the release of Owens's death warrant that he had an unwritten agreement with the state's prosecutors that he would testify against Owens should the death penalty and life sentence both be taken off the table. Owens's lawyers argued that the credibility of Golden's testimony, which was the only evidence linking Owens as the shooter who killed Irene Graves, should be questioned and Owens's conviction might not stand. According to the South Carolina Department of Corrections, Golden is tentatively scheduled to be released in 2026.

In another appeal, Owens's lawyers claimed that they were provided with inadequate information about the drugs used for lethal injection, and that this had not allowed them to make a fully informed choice between lethal injection and firing squad (electrocution was not considered since Owens rejected this method). Starting with the impending execution of Owens, the prison authorities in South Carolina planned to make use of single doses of pentobarbital to execute prisoners instead of their original three-drug combination.

On September 12, 2024, the South Carolina Supreme Court rejected Owens's appeal in relation to the drugs and alleged new evidence. The judges unanimously agreed that the new evidence regarding the supposed secret deal and Owens's argument that he was not a major participant in the robbery-murder were hardly compelling enough to call for a re-opening of his case and halt his execution. The judges stated that they believed that Owens was the killer based on the available evidence, and added that, even if Owens did not pull the trigger, it did not change the fact that there was a common intention between Owens and Golden to commit the robbery, where Owens likely knew there was a grave risk of causing death. In furtherance of their intention to rob her, the perpetrators shot and killed Irene Graves.

After exhausting his state appeal processes, Owens took his case further to the federal courts. On September 18, 2024, U.S. District Judge Jacquelyn D. Austin rejected Owens's appeal, in which his lawyers sought a stay of execution and made a request to allow the state to share more information about the drug used for lethal injection executions despite their secrecy law. On the morning of September 20, 2024, the date he was slated to be executed, Owens lost his subsequent appeal to the 4th Circuit Court of Appeals.

The U.S. Supreme Court rejected Owens's final appeal on the same evening Owens was scheduled to be put to death.

==== Claims of innocence ====
Two days before Owens's scheduled execution, on September 18, 2024, his lawyers submitted an emergency motion based on a written statement from his accomplice Steven Golden, who stated that he had falsely accused Owens as the shooter. He claimed that the real killer was someone else, whom he dared not point out for fear that the man or his associates would murder him, and that he had chosen to speak up out of conscience to prevent the execution of an innocent man. Owens's lawyers argued that in light of Golden's alleged admission to giving false evidence, the execution date should be staved off as it warranted the need for a new trial for Owens to prove his innocence.

The claims of innocence were rejected by the South Carolina Supreme Court. The judges found that Golden's decision to change his story could not be the reason to stop the execution as they found his new testimony "squarely inconsistent" with the multiple occasions where Owens had confessed to the police, his then girlfriend, his mother, and another accomplice that he had murdered Irene Graves. Moreover, Owens himself had given testimony in both his 1999 murder trial and the 2003 re-sentencing trial about committing the murder. Golden's claims were similarly refuted by the prosecution prior to the court ruling. They argued that there was other evidence to prove Owens was the real murderer, and that Golden's veracity was questionable because he had changed his story at such a late date.

=== Clemency campaign ===
While Owens was still appealing against his sentence, several anti-death penalty activists conducted a campaign to seek clemency from South Carolina's state Governor Henry McMaster. Under state law, the final recourse for Owens, who had already exhausted all his appeals, was to appeal for clemency from the governor of South Carolina, and if successful, his death sentence would be commuted to life imprisonment. McMaster, who stated he "respects jury verdicts and court decisions", declined to reveal if he would offer clemency for Owens, although it was longtime tradition for the governor to make a phone call to prison officials minutes before the scheduled execution, informing them of the governor's decision on whether or not clemency will be allowed. At this point in time, since the 1976 resumption of capital punishment, none of the governors in South Carolina, including McMaster, had ever granted clemency to a death row inmate, and McMaster, who was a former attorney general of South Carolina prior to his tenure as the incumbent governor, was known for his strong support of the death penalty.

Hillary Taylor, Executive Director of South Carolinians for Alternatives to the Death Penalty, commented on Owens's case, stating that no one was beyond redemption and no one had the right to take a life. Taylor and other activists pointed out that Owens was African American and in South Carolina itself, a disproportionate number of African Americans were executed in the state, and that Owens was 19 when the murder of Graves happened, which were other factors raised by the group in favour of sparing Owens from execution. David Kennedy, a member of the NAACP, stated that only God - not the people or the state of South Carolina - had the right to take a life.

Gerald King, Owens's lawyer, argued that it was unsafe to execute his client because of the existence of the alleged secret agreement made between the prosecution and Owens's accomplice Golden. He further stated that executing Owen based on alleged false testimony made by Golden to incriminate him as the shooter would be unfair and urged the governor to spare his client's life.

On September 18, 2024, Owens petitioned for clemency from McMaster, imploring the governor to commute his death sentence.

On September 20, 2024, McMaster announced that he would not grant clemency to Owens, allowing the execution to move forward.

== Execution ==
On September 20, 2024, 46-year-old Owens was put to death by lethal injection at Broad River Correctional Institution. He declined to make a formal final statement, although he said "bye", to his attorney. At approximately 6:45 pm, Owens was administered a single dose of pentobarbital and was pronounced dead at 6:55 pm.

Owens was the first person to be executed in South Carolina since 2011. Owens's mother, who released a statement prior to her son's execution, called the death of her son a "grave injustice" against him and maintained that her son never killed Graves despite the evidence that incriminated Owens.

For his final meal, Owens ordered two cheeseburgers, some french fries, a well-done ribeye steak, six chicken wings and two strawberry sodas as well as a slice of apple pie.

Owens was the first of the five inmates across five different states in the U.S. who were slated to be executed within a one-week period between September 20 and 26, 2024. The other four inmates were Travis James Mullis, who was convicted of murdering his three-month-old son in Texas in 2008; Marcellus Williams, who was convicted of murdering a former reporter in Missouri in 1998; Alan Eugene Miller, who was convicted of murdering three people in a 1999 spree shooting in Alabama; and Emmanuel Littlejohn, who was convicted of murdering a convenience store owner in Oklahoma in 1992.

== See also ==
- Capital punishment in South Carolina
- Capital punishment in the United States
- List of people executed in South Carolina
- List of people executed in the United States in 2024

Executions carried out in South Carolina
Preceded by Jeffrey Motts May 6, 2011	Freddie Eugene Owens; September 20, 2024	Succeeded by Richard Bernard Moore November 1, 2024
Executions carried out in the United States
Preceded by Loran Cole – Florida August 29, 2024	Freddie Eugene Owens – South Carolina; September 20, 2024	Succeeded by Marcellus Williams – Missouri September 24, 2024
