= Quincy Allen =

American serial killer

- Born: Quincy Jovan Allen; November 7, 1979 (age 47); Columbia, South Carolina, U.S.
- Convictions: South Carolina; Murder (2 counts); Arson (3 counts); Assault and battery with intent to kill Pointing a firearm North Carolina; First degree murder (2 counts); Robbery with dangerous weapon Larceny
- Penalty: South Carolina; Death; commuted to life imprisonment North Carolina; Life imprisonment

Details
- Victims: 4
- Span of crimes: July – August 2002
- Country: United States
- States: South Carolina; North Carolina
- Date apprehended: August 14, 2002
- Imprisoned at: Broad River Correctional Institution, Columbia, South Carolina

Quincy Jovan Allen (born November 7, 1979) is an American serial killer who killed four people between July and August in a crime spree in 2002. He was sentenced to death for his crimes in South Carolina, but he was resentenced to life imprisonment in 2024.

== Crimes ==
Allen was inspired to begin his crime spree during his time in federal prison for stealing a vehicle. While incarcerated, a fellow inmate told him that he could get him a job as a Mafia hitman. When he was released, Allen decided to buy a shotgun and begin practicing for his promised career.

=== Timeline of events ===
- July 7, 2002: Allen, in order to practice using his shotgun, decided to attack 51-year-old homeless man James White at a bench in Finlay Park in Columbia, South Carolina. The sleeping White was shot twice, but survived the attack.
- July 10, 2002: Allen killed 45-year-old Dale Evonne Hall (or Hale) near a Columbia I-77 stop using his sawed-off shotgun. Hall was shot in the head, face, leg, and stomach area. Allen then drove to a nearby truck stop, bought a can of gasoline and returned to the body, dousing it and then subsequently burning it.
- August 8, 2002: After a confrontation with Texas Roadhouse employee Brian Marquis, Allen fatally shot 22-year-old Jedediah "Jed" Harr, a friend of Marquis who tried to intervene. Soon after the scuffle, he chased after Marquis to his house, setting the porch on fire.
- August 9, 2002: Allen set fire to the car of another Texas Roadhouse employee, before randomly selecting and subsequently burning another a few minutes later.
- August 12, 2002: While robbing a Citgo gasoline station in Dobson, North Carolina, Allen fatally shot 53-year-old Richard Calvin Hawks from Lowgap, North Carolina and 29-year-old Robert Shane Roush from Lancaster, Ohio.
- August 14, 2002: Allen was arrested while sleeping in an abandoned car in Mitchell County, Texas.

== Death row stabbing ==
On the morning of December 2, 2009, Allen, along with fellow death row inmate Mikal Deen Mahdi, a Lawrenceville, Virginia man on death row for the 2004 murder of Orangeburg Department of Public Safety Captain James Myers, 56, in Calhoun County, South Carolina, planned to attack and kill a correctional officer while in the Lieber Correctional Institution. After making shivs using metal they stripped from air ducts, the duo asked the correctional officer Nathan Sasser if they could go visit the basketball court. After escorting them there, they attacked Sasser, stabbing him multiple times. He managed to resist and fought them off despite his heavy injuries.

Allen and Mahdi then attempted to jump the fence, but after they were unable to escape, they began tearing up the common area. Even after the guards used tear gas on them, they still refused to back down. Eventually, rubber bullets were used to subdue the pair.

Following this incident, both were stripped of their privileges (outside recreation, visitation, phone use, and canteen items) and in 2017, both were transferred along with all other South Carolina death row inmates to the Kirkland Correctional Institution in Columbia. Sasser was later let go from his post, as he had developed PTSD and had begun suffering from anxiety attacks. All assault charges from him were later dropped by the prosecutors, who said that there was no point, as both prisoners were already sentenced to death.

== Trials ==
After pleading guilty to the killings, Allen was sentenced to death and scheduled to be executed on January 8, 2010. However, a stay of execution was filed by his attorneys hours after the verdict was announced, with the South Carolina Supreme Court accepting the motion. A new date was not announced and Allen's death sentence was overturned by the 4th Circuit Court of Appeals on July 26, 2022. On July 23, 2024, Allen accepted a plea deal in which his sentence would be reduced to life imprisonment in exchange for him waiving all rights to appeal the sentence.

== See also ==
- List of serial killers in the United States
