= Brad Sigmon =

American convicted murderer (1957–2025)

- 2021 mugshot of Sigmon
- Born: November 12, 1957; South Carolina, U.S.
- Died: March 7, 2025 (aged 67); Broad River Correctional Institution, South Carolina, U.S.
- Status: Executed by firing squad
- Motive: Girlfriend ended their relationship
- Convictions: Murder (×2); First-degree burglary
- Penalty: Death (×2; murder); 30 years' imprisonment (first-degree burglary)

Details
- Victims: 2
- Date: April 27, 2001
- Country: United States
- State: South Carolina
- Weapon: Baseball bat
- Imprisoned at: Broad River Correctional Institution

Brad Keith Sigmon (November 12, 1957 – March 7, 2025) was an American convicted murderer who was executed for the 2001 double murder of his ex-girlfriend's parents in South Carolina. Sigmon was convicted of bludgeoning David and Gladys Larke, aged 62 and 59, respectively, to death with a baseball bat on April 27, 2001, a week after he and his former girlfriend had broken up.

Subsequently, Sigmon was found guilty and given two death sentences for the double murder. He was also given a 30-year jail term for first-degree burglary. Sigmon was executed by firing squad on March 7, 2025, becoming the first person in almost 15 years to be executed by this method after Ronnie Lee Gardner, as well as the oldest person executed in the state.

== Early life ==
Brad Keith Sigmon was born to Ronnie and Virginia (Wooten) Sigmon on November 12, 1957, in the U.S. state of South Carolina. His mother was only 17 when he was born, and his four younger siblings were within one year apart from each other. Sigmon's father was part of the US military. As a result, the family frequently needed to move. Sigmon was raised initially in Taylors, South Carolina, and Greer, South Carolina, and later in other towns in the state as well as the Philippines shortly after the birth of his youngest sibling.

Sigmon's parents eventually divorced when he was still young, as Ronnie was an alcoholic who often abused Virginia. This, along with the other challenges of being a young mother, and adapting to military life, proved difficult for Virginia. Although Ronnie allegedly never hit the younger four children, he physically abused Sigmon who would often try to protect Virginia from Ronnie's beatings. The parents eventually married other people, and Sigmon often moved back and forth between the homes of his parents and stepparents.

Sigmon began to work at age 16 while still in high school in Simpsonville to help alleviate his family's financial burden. After his parents' divorce, he took on the responsibility of taking care of his younger siblings. At age 18, Sigmon's string of criminal activity began in Greer with an armed robbery charge on May 29, 1976.

In 1977, Sigmon dropped out of high school (merely nine weeks before he was scheduled to graduate) in order to marry. The couple moved from Upstate South Carolina to Manning, South Carolina, shortly before their marriage, and would later have a son. According to Sigmon's son, parents, siblings, stepfather (Virginia's second husband), and aunt, Sigmon was a loving son, father, and brother who deeply cared about his family.

Court sources revealed that Sigmon struggled with both drug use problems and mental health issues during his adulthood. Throughout much of the 1980s, his criminal record was mostly DUI and DWI charges. On November 17, 1990, Sigmon was treated at a Clarendon County hospital after being shot several times in the stomach while breaking into his wife's home in Manning in connection with a domestic dispute. Their 12-year-old son was also injured after being struck by one bullet in the arm. Sigmon was transported after treatment to Richland County for surgery before being released around a week later. Sigmon returned to Greenville County later in the 1990s where he last resided in the city of Greenville.

== Murders of David and Gladys Larke ==
Sigmon had been in a romantic relationship with Rebecca Barbare for about three years. They lived together in a trailer. However, early in 2001, Barbare ended their relationship and moved in with her parents William David Larke (better known as David Larke; February 28, 1939 – April 27, 2001) and Gladys Gwendolyn Larke (January 1, 1942 – April 27, 2001) nearby at 948 East Darby Road in Taylors, South Carolina. Sigmon became progressively more obsessed with her, even going as far as to stalk her in an attempt to check if she was dating another man, in addition to his requests to rekindle their relationship.

After Sigmon and his friend Eugene Strube spent the night of April 26, 2001, drinking alcohol and consuming cocaine, Sigmon informed Strube that when Barbare left to take her children to school, he planned to go to the Larkes' house, "tie her parents up", and "get a hold of" Barbare. Strube was initially supposed to follow along with Sigmon's plan, but he later backed out.

On April 27, Sigmon entered the home of the Larkes, where he found 62-year-old David Larke in the kitchen and Gladys Larke in the living room. Armed with a baseball bat, Sigmon attacked the couple, beating them with the bat, going back and forth between the two rooms. Each of the Larkes sustained nine blows to their heads, which crushed their skulls. After murdering the Larkes, Sigmon stole David's gun and waited for Rebecca Barbare to return home.

When she arrived, Sigmon forced her into a 2001 Honda Passport at gunpoint. Sigmon's plan was to switch vehicles and drive his car up to North Carolina with Barbare. However, Barbare managed to jump out of the Honda and run away. Sigmon shot at her while giving chase, but Barbare managed to escape. Sigmon relented and fled the scene. Barbare subsequently underwent treatment in the Greenville Memorial Hospital.

After the murders became known, the police conducted a nationwide manhunt for Sigmon. A charge sheet was issued for Sigmon on charges of murder (pertaining to the Larkes) and kidnapping and assault with intent to kill (pertaining to Barbare's abduction). After 11 days, Sigmon was captured in Gatlinburg, Tennessee. Then, he was extradited back to South Carolina. The state authorities also planned to seek the death penalty for Sigmon with respect to the double murder charges.

== Trial and appeals ==
After his arrest, Sigmon was indicted by a South Carolina grand jury for two counts of murder, first-degree burglary, and other offenses, including kidnapping. Sigmon eventually stood trial in July 2002 for both counts of murder and a single count of first-degree burglary, and he reportedly admitted his guilt to the jury. The jury subsequently found him guilty of all charges, and they would decide on his sentence.

The prosecution sought the death penalty for Sigmon, stating that both Gladys and David Larke suffered the "most horrific death," and based on the aggravating factors of the case, Sigmon should be sentenced to death, so as to show him the same mercy he demonstrated to his victims. The defense, in response, urged the jury to consider that Sigmon acted out due to his relationship issues. Seeking life imprisonment for Sigmon, the defense cited the mitigating factors of Sigmon's case, including his good behaviour in jail and adulthood drug problems. Eventually, the jury unanimously agreed to sentence Sigmon to death for both counts of murder on July 20, 2002. Apart from the two death sentences, Sigmon was also sentenced to 30 years in prison for the burglary charge.

On December 19, 2005, the South Carolina Supreme Court turned down Brad Sigmon's direct appeal against his two death sentences and double murder conviction. On May 8, 2013, Sigmon's second appeal to the South Carolina Supreme Court was also rejected. On September 30, 2018, the U.S. District Court for the District of South Carolina dismissed Sigmon's first federal appeal. On April 14, 2020, the 4th Circuit Court of Appeals rejected Sigmon's appeal. On January 11, 2021, Sigmon's final appeal was dismissed by the U.S. Supreme Court.

== 2021 and 2022 death warrants ==
After exhausting all his avenues of appeal, Brad Sigmon was originally scheduled to be executed on February 12, 2021. However, on February 5, 2021, one week before his execution date, Sigmon was issued an indefinite stay of execution by the South Carolina Supreme Court. The court found that the state did not have the drugs necessary to facilitate the execution of Sigmon by lethal injection, which was the state's primary method of execution.

At that time, South Carolina had effectively imposed an unofficial moratorium on executions following the state's last execution in 2011. This was due to a shortage of lethal injection drugs, caused by the expiration of existing supplies and the refusal of many pharmaceutical companies to sell drugs for executions.

In response to the state's inability to carry out lethal injections, lawmakers in South Carolina passed new legislation to reintroduce and legalize the electric chair and firing squad as alternative methods for future executions when lethal injection was not an option. The absence of lethal injection drugs in the state would eventually be resolved in September 2023, after the state authorities had successfully acquired new drugs, allowing it to resume lethal injection executions.

After the new laws were passed, Sigmon and another death row inmate, Freddie Eugene Owens, had new execution dates set. Sigmon was rescheduled to be executed by the electric chair on June 18, 2021, while Owens's date was set exactly one week later (June 25, 2021). However, Sigmon's second death warrant was suspended (and in turn, Owens's), after the South Carolina Supreme Court ruled that the executions of Sigmon and Owens should be postponed until they were given the choice of death by electrocution or firing squad—especially because the legalization of latter option was yet to be finalized and the former option was the sole available execution method at this point in time. Another reason the court stayed their executions was that both Owens and Sigmon had filed a lawsuit against the state's revival of the electric chair.

A year later, Sigmon's third death warrant was issued, rescheduling his execution date to May 13, 2022. However, in light of a lawsuit filed by the condemned against the electric chair and firing squad execution methods, Sigmon received another stay of execution until the full resolution of the lawsuit.

== Lawsuit against state execution policies ==
In 2023, Brad Sigmon was among several death row prisoners who filed a lawsuit against South Carolina over the state's decision to introduce the firing squad and electric chair as alternative execution methods. The inmates argued that these methods were unconstitutional because they could inflict unnecessary pain and suffering, constituting cruel and unusual punishment. In response, the state argued that both the electric chair and firing squad adhered to existing legal procedures, and there was no legal precedent requiring executions to be instantaneous or painless for those sentenced to death.

On July 31, 2024, the South Carolina Supreme Court, in a five-judge ruling, dismissed the lawsuit and upheld the constitutionality of both the electric chair and firing squad. The majority of the justices voiced support for these methods, with three backing the firing squad and four favoring the electric chair. This ruling paved the way for the potential resumption of executions in South Carolina, affecting all 32 inmates on the state's death row, including Sigmon. At the time of this ruling, five condemned inmates – consisting of Sigmon, Freddie Eugene Owens, Mikal Mahdi, Richard Bernard Moore, and Marion Bowman Jr. – had exhausted all avenues of appeal and were listed for imminent execution on later dates.

The 13-year moratorium on executions in South Carolina came to an end on September 20, 2024, when one of the five inmates, Freddie Owens, was executed for the 1997 murder of a convenience store clerk. Richard Moore later became the second condemned inmate to die on November 1, 2024. Marion Bowman Jr. became the third of the six condemned inmates on the list to die on January 31, 2025.

== Execution ==
=== Delay of execution order ===
On August 28, 2024, the South Carolina Supreme Court issued an order allowing the state to carry out six executions over the next year, with each execution scheduled to occur 35 days (or five weeks) apart.

Sigmon was one of those six executions in the order. The other five individuals on the list were Freddie Eugene Owens, Richard Bernard Moore, Marion Bowman Jr., Steven Bixby, and Mikal Mahdi. Owens and Moore – who were sentenced to death in 1999 and 2001 respectively – became the first two to be executed, on September 20 and November 1, 2024. Following their executions, Bowman, convicted in 2002 for the 2001 arson-murder of a woman, was set to receive his execution date on November 8, 2024, which was tentatively scheduled for December 6, 2024.

However, Bowman's death warrant was not issued as planned because Bowman, along with Sigmon and the other two inmates facing imminent execution, filed an appeal to the South Carolina Supreme Court. They requested that their executions be delayed until after the winter holiday period, specifically after Christmas and New Year's Day. In response, the state argued that it was not uncommon for executions to take place during the holiday season, citing five executions carried out by the state between December 4, 1998, and January 8, 1999. However, the lawyers representing the four death row inmates submitted a statement to the court, arguing that "six consecutive executions with virtually no respite will take a substantial toll on all involved, particularly during a time of year that is so important to families."

On November 14, 2024, the South Carolina Supreme Court granted the inmates a temporary respite, and agreed to not sign any new death warrants until at least January 3, 2025. On January 3, 2025, Bowman's execution was scheduled, and it was carried out on January 31, 2025.

=== 2025 death warrant and final appeal ===
Brad has no illusions about what being shot will do to his body. He does not wish to inflict that pain on his family, the witnesses, or the execution team. But, given South Carolina's unnecessary and unconscionable secrecy, Brad is choosing as best he can. [...] There is no justice here. Everything about this barbaric, state-sanctioned atrocity – from the choice to the method itself – is abjectly cruel. We should not just be horrified – we should be furious.

— Gerald "Bo" King, lawyer of Brad Sigmon, to AP News

On February 7, 2025, the South Carolina Supreme Court issued Sigmon's death warrant and scheduled his execution for March 7, 2025. The court gave him until February 21 to select his preferred method of execution, with the options of lethal injection, electrocution, or firing squad. If he declined to choose a method, the electric chair would be chosen by default.

A week after the death warrant was signed, Sigmon filed an appeal for a stay of execution, asking the court to delay his death warrant until his lawyers received the autopsy report of Marion Bowman Jr., whose execution took place two weeks prior, in order to review the report before selecting the preferred method of Sigmon's execution. According to Sigmon's lawyers, Sigmon did not want to die on the electric chair and wanted to choose between firing squad and lethal injection, but he was hesitant to pick the latter option due to witnesses' accounts that in the state's previous three executions, the inmates were not pronounced dead within 20 minutes after receiving a single dose of pentobarbital.

On February 21, 2025, Sigmon appealed to the South Carolina Supreme Court to hear more evidence of his brain damage, mental illness, and childhood trauma—all factors Sigmon cited as making him ineligible for capital punishment. That same day, Sigmon chose to be executed by firing squad. Only three people, all in Utah, were put to death by firing squad since the 1976 resumption of capital punishment in the United States, the most recent being in 2010. At the age of 67, Sigmon would also be the oldest person executed in South Carolina since capital punishment was restored.

According to his lawyer, Sigmon felt that the electric chair might "burn and cook him alive;" he feared that lethal injection would cause him to suffer a prolonged death that lasted more than 20 minutes; and he knew that the firing squad would give him a violent death. Although Sigmon did not wish to "inflict that pain" on his family, executioners and witnesses, he nonetheless decided that the firing squad would be the best option in light of the risks of lethal injection highlighted by the previous three executions conducted before his. King also said, "He knows what the firing squad is going to do to his body—he knows it's going to break his bones, he knows it's gonna pulverize his organs. And it's a measure of how impossible the choice was here."

In response to inquiries, the South Carolina Department of Corrections stated that they were ready to carry out firing squad executions, as they had completed the renovation of the death chamber to cater for firing squad executions. When such executions are carried out, the inmate will be hooded and strapped into the chair. A three-member firing squad team, armed with rifles containing live ammunition, will be set to open fire once the warden reads the execution order. The team will stand 15 feet away from the prisoner before shooting. The witnesses to the execution—including reporters, family members of the victim(s) and inmate, attorneys, and prison staff—would only see "the right-side profile of the inmate" behind the bullet-resistant glass. Another report revealed that the prison department had spent about $54,000 to construct the firing squad death chamber in 2022.

On February 27, 2025, after the release of Marion Bowman's autopsy report, Sigmon appealed to the South Carolina Supreme Court to further delay his execution. Sigmon stated that he was entitled to further information regarding the lethal injection drug and administration procedure. His lawyers claimed that Sigmon was forced to choose a violent death due to him fearing a more tortuous death by lethal injection with double doses of pentobarbital, citing that Marion Bowman was executed with two doses of pentobarbital and had fluid in his lungs, which led to the sensation of drowning. However, on March 4, 2025, the South Carolina Supreme Court unanimously denied Sigmon's request to a stay of execution.

As a final resort, Sigmon appealed to the Supreme Court of the United States to put a stop to his execution. It denied the appeal on the afternoon of March 7, 2025, hours before the scheduled execution.

Apart from his final court appeals, Sigmon also petitioned for clemency from the Governor Henry McMaster, and his supporters stated that Sigmon was a reformed man who was often friendly with other inmates and devoted himself to religion, and that he was no longer the same man who brutally killed two people, thus he deserved mercy based on his rehabilitative progress. However, McMaster denied clemency for Sigmon.

=== Reactions ===
In response to the upcoming execution of her former boyfriend, Rebecca Barbare, now known as Rebecca Armstrong, stated that she did not believe in the death penalty but nonetheless wanted Sigmon to face the consequences for murdering her parents. Armstrong said her parents were "simple country folks with five children who often looked out for people around them and her father had a good heart," and that they were the ones keeping the family together. Armstrong's son (the grandson of the Larkes) planned to attend the execution, as he wanted Sigmon to pay the ultimate price for the murder of his grandparents.

Firearms experts had expressed concerns regarding the safety of the execution hall for onlookers and the executioners, due to the possibility of stray bullets ricocheting off of the prison's "bullet-resistant" walls. Questions regarding these safety concerns were not answered when a spokesperson was pressed earlier in the week.

=== Firing squad execution ===
I did see a splash of blood when the bullets entered his body. It was not a huge amount, but there was a splash that you could see kind of protrude from the wound. [...] But there was some movement that went on there for two or three seconds. It was very fast. [...] You couldn't see his whole face, but I did not pick up on anything in his expression that would have indicated fear.

— Anna Dobbins of WYFF 4 News (March 7, 2025)

On March 7, 2025, Brad Sigmon was put to death by firing squad in the Broad River Correctional Institution. The firing squad, which was composed of volunteer prison employees, fired at 6:05 pm, and Sigmon flexed his arms and heaved in the chair for a few seconds before he fell motionless, and he was pronounced dead at 6:08 pm. A basin was situated beneath the chair to catch his blood.

Attendees of the execution included his lawyer, religious counsellors, families of his victims and three reporters. Journalist Jeffery Collins of AP News, who attended and witnessed the execution, claimed there was "no warning or countdown" prior to the squad opening fire on Sigmon, who had been strapped to a chair and was fitted with a hood over his head and a target over his chest. Witnesses believed that Sigmon mouthed that he was "okay" to his lawyer, despite his jaw being "held in place with a sling." After the shots, Collins described seeing a "jagged red spot about the size of a small fist" in the area in which Sigmon was shot. He also recounted that Sigmon's "chest moved two or three times. Outside of the rifle crack, there was no sound." Anna Dobbins of WYFF 4 News also witnessed the execution, and recounted seeing a "splash of blood" upon the bullets impacting his body. She said, "His arms flexed. There was something in his midsection that moved. I'm not necessarily going to call them breaths. I don't really know." She also stated that there was movement in Sigmon's body for several seconds afterward. She also stated that he exhibited no apparent signs of fear or apprehension before being shot.

Sigmon's lawyer King described the execution as "horrifying and violent," and said that after he was shot, his arm tensed up and violently quivered, "as if he was trying to break free from the restraints." He also said the bullet wound "opened very abruptly and violently."

I want my closing statement to be one of love and a calling to [his] fellow Christians to end the death penalty. An eye for an eye was used as justification to the jury for seeking the death penalty. Why? Because we no longer live under the Old Testament law but now live under the New Testament. [...] We are now under God's grace and mercy.

— Excerpt from Sigmon's closing statement, as read by his lawyer, Gerald "Bo" King

The firing squad that carried out the execution was armed with weapons containing .308 Winchester ammunition. This sort of ammunition was specifically designed to break apart upon impact with a target for the intended purpose of destroying vital organs, such as a heart, causing death shortly thereafter.

Sigmon became the fourth person in the United States to be executed by firing squad since 1976, the first since the execution of Ronnie Lee Gardner in Utah in June 2010. As a result of Sigmon's execution, South Carolina became the second state in the United States to carry out a firing squad execution; the country's first three firing squad executions since 1976 (including Gardner's) were conducted by Utah.

For his last meal, Sigmon requested fried chicken from Kentucky Fried Chicken, green beans, mashed potatoes with gravy, biscuits, cheesecake and sweet tea. Sigmon originally asked for three buckets of the fried chicken and wanted to share them with the other inmates, but reports varied as to whether this request was granted.

In his final statement, Sigmon hoped for the end of the death penalty and found it unjustified under the New Testament for him to pay with his life for the murders of David and Gladys Larke, stating that they were no longer living under the Old Testament and no one had the authority to take lives except for God.

== See also ==
- Capital punishment in South Carolina
- List of people executed in South Carolina
- List of people executed in the United States in 2025

Executions by firing squad in the United States
Preceded by Ronnie Lee Gardner – Utah June 18, 2010	Brad Sigmon – South Carolina; March 7, 2025	Succeeded by Mikal Mahdi – South Carolina April 11, 2025
Executions carried out in South Carolina
Preceded by Marion Bowman Jr. January 31, 2025	Brad Sigmon; March 7, 2025	Succeeded by Mikal Mahdi April 11, 2025
Executions carried out in the United States
Preceded by Richard Lee Tabler – Texas February 13, 2025	Brad Sigmon – South Carolina; March 7, 2025	Succeeded by Jessie Hoffman Jr. – Louisiana March 18, 2025
