= 2003 standoff in Abbeville, South Carolina =

14-hour standoff and shootout

- Constable Donnie Ouzts (left) and Sergeant Danny Wilson (right)
- Location: 34°09′22″N 82°23′24″W; Abbeville, South Carolina, United States
- Date: December 8, 2003; 22 years ago
- Attack type: Standoff and shootout
- Weapon: 7mm Magnum rifle
- Deaths: Danny Wilson; Donnie Ouzts
- Injuries: 1 (Arthur Bixby)
- Perpetrators: Arthur Bixby; Rita Bixby; Steven Bixby
- Motive: Dispute over surveying during the planning of a highway widening project

On December 8, 2003, a 14-hour standoff and shootout took place in Abbeville, South Carolina, United States, between alleged extremists and self-proclaimed "sovereign citizens" Arthur, Rita, and their son Steven Bixby; and members of the Abbeville city police department, the Abbeville County sheriff's office, the South Carolina Highway Patrol, the South Carolina Department of Transportation, and the South Carolina Law Enforcement Division.

The standoff resulted in the deaths of two law enforcement officers, after which Rita and Steven were found guilty of various charges. Arthur was found mentally incompetent to stand trial and died in a mental facility in 2011. Rita died of cancer in prison less than a week after her husband. Steven is on death row awaiting execution pending appeals.

== Overview ==
The standoff, which resulted from a dispute between the Bixbys and the state of South Carolina over surveying during the planning of a highway widening project, resulted in the deaths of two lawmen, Abbeville County Deputy Sheriff Sgt. Daniel "Danny Boy" Wilson, 37, and State Constable Donald McMurray "Donnie" Ouzts, 61. All three Bixbys were taken into police custody after surrendering late in the evening of December 8.

On February 19, 2007, a Chesterfield County jury found Steven Vernon Bixby (born August 17, 1967) guilty on 17 counts, including both murders as well as several lesser charges of kidnapping and conspiracy. On February 21, 2007, this same jury recommended that Steven Bixby receive two death sentences for the murders and 125 years in prison for the lesser charges. Bixby was scheduled to be executed on April 22, 2007; however, the appeals process had not been exhausted. On August 16, 2010, the South Carolina Supreme Court affirmed the conviction of Steven Bixby and the death sentence. On April 25, 2011, the United States Supreme Court denied Bixby's petition for a writ of certiorari, effectively ending his appeals process. Steven Bixby is currently on South Carolina's death row at the Broad River Correctional Institution in Richland County.

On October 26, 2007, an Abbeville County, South Carolina jury found Rita Leona Bixby (née Greenwood; August 4, 1932 – September 12, 2011) guilty of two counts of accessory before the fact of murder and one count of conspiracy. She was given two life sentences on the accessory charges and five additional years for conspiracy, the maximum sentence for that crime.

Arthur Walls Bixby (July 4, 1929 – September 5, 2011) had developed dementia by 2008, was found mentally incompetent to stand trial, and was subsequently committed to a mental facility.

== Events leading to the standoff ==
The Bixby family lived in Warren, New Hampshire. There, Arthur Bixby was jailed for failure to pay $850, three years after a judgement in a lawsuit. The family's behavior prompted the judge in the case to arrange full-time security. Rita Bixby reportedly had a long history of filing frivolous lawsuits in New Hampshire courts; one such lawsuit attempted to gain title to land belonging to the Bixbys' neighbors. The court dismissed this suit, but an undeterred Rita Bixby attempted (unsuccessfully) to hold a sheriff's sale of the property in question. The Bixbys also frequently attempted to bypass traditional legal processes by filing claims and suits in unofficial "common law courts", claiming that they were "sovereign citizens" and hence had the right to pursue legal action in whatever manner desired.

In New Hampshire, Steven Bixby was convicted of driving while drunk and without a license in 1992. In 1994, an arrest warrant was issued when he missed parole check-ins and had failed to pay the fines. He arrived in Abbeville in the 1990s and his parents arrived in 2000. They moved into a small home situated at 4 Union Church Road, near the junction of South Carolina Highway 72, Union Church Road, and Horton Drive, in West Abbeville. The parcel of land surrounding the Bixby residence was subject to a 1960 easement granted by a previous owner, Haskell Johnson, to the state of South Carolina, allowing for the South Carolina Department of Transportation (SCDOT) to expand its right-of-way on the portion of the property adjoining Highway 72, should it desire to widen this highway in the future. It was debated, however, whether Johnson's granting of this easement to the state was properly recorded by Abbeville County register of deeds. When the 1960 easement was granted, it was permissible under state law to record highway right-of-way instruments in the records vault at the SCDOT headquarters in Columbia. For many years, the SCDOT has also recorded at local county courthouses. In this situation, the 1960 easement was only on file in the SCDOT records vault and not at the Abbeville County courthouse.

In the early 2000s, the state of South Carolina began widening Highway 72 from the Georgia state line to just east of Abbeville. Reportedly, the state determined in late 2003 that it would need to enter its easement on a strip of the Bixbys' land approximately ten feet in length to construct the project. Angered by what they claimed was an unconstitutional theft of their property by the SCDOT, the Bixbys sent numerous written appeals to various state officials, arguing that the easement in question had been obtained illegally. Some of these appeals, laced with references to the New Hampshire state constitution, invocations of the New Hampshire state motto, and fierce statements underscoring the Bixbys' seeming willingness to die for their beliefs, did not arrive at state offices until after the standoff had concluded. On November 4, 2003, Rita wrote an email to family and friends which said that if anything was done on their property, there would be two shotguns that "would not be just for show". On Thursday, December 4, 2003, the SCDOT officials brought a copy of the easement to the Bixby home. They informed the Bixbys that they would act on the easement and take 20 feet of land and that the Bixbys had the option to buy additional footage for the nominal consideration of $1. Rita and Arthur wrote a letter to numerous state officials who closed quoting Patrick Henry ("Give me liberty or give me death!") and John Stark ("Live free or die: Death is not the worst of evils.") and ending with "We, the undersigned, echo those sentiments."

On Friday, December 5, 2003, officials with the SCDOT began staking out the portion of the Bixbys' land to be used for the highway project construction. The Bixbys posted signs on their property prohibiting trespassing by "govermen [sic] agents and all others". At the trial of Rita Bixby, the prosecution presented evidence that, on December 5, 2003, there was a meeting between Rita, Steven, and Arthur Bixby and SCDOT officials Drew McCaffrey, Michael Hannah, and Dale Williams to address the Bixbys' concerns. At the trial of Rita Bixby, McCaffrey testified: "I offered to show them the plans detailing who owned the right of way, but Rita Bixby said the plans were all lies." Arthur Bixby also attempted to sabotage survey work by removing stakes from the yard and throwing them into the middle of Highway 72. It may have been about this time that the Bixbys began heavily fortifying their home in preparation for a standoff with police or the government.

== The standoff ==
Early on December 8, 2003, a highway worker contacted police accusing Arthur and Steven Bixby of making threatening statements and again disrupting the laying out of survey stakes along Highway 72. Abbeville County Sheriff's Deputy Sgt. Daniel "Danny Boy" Wilson responded to this complaint, arriving at the Bixbys' home around 9:15 AM, only to be shot by Steven Bixby at point-blank range with a 7mm Magnum rifle. At both Steven Bixby's trial and at Rita Bixby's trial, the prosecution presented evidence that Steven Bixby dragged Wilson into the house, used Wilson's handcuffs to cuff his hands behind his back, made a "citizen’s arrest" of Wilson for trespassing and read him his Miranda rights. Wilson was then held hostage for the next fourteen hours, sometime during which he died from his wound. Additional evidence showed that Steven Bixby was inside the Bixby home when he fired the hunting rifle through a window and struck Wilson underneath his armpit. After making vain attempts to contact Wilson, authorities sent State Constable Donnie Ouzts to investigate. Within minutes, Ouzts was fatally shot as well.

The bullet that struck Ouzts did so in the back near his spine and right shoulder blade, traveling across the body at an angle — from right to left — hitting his liver and passing through his heart. Death was nearly instantaneous. Wilson was hit just inside his protective vest, on his left side near his left armpit and left pectoral muscle. "It was a rather large, irregular wound," Woodard said. The bullet traveled through Wilson, striking his aorta and breaking his backbone. According to testimony, following the gunshot, Wilson would have immediately lost all feeling below the wound and died shortly after that from trauma to the aorta and severe blood loss. He would have lost consciousness almost immediately after the gunshot wound was inflicted. Woodard also testified that Wilson's left arm was raised when he was shot. This evidence suggested Wilson could have been knocking on the door when the bullet hit him.

At this point, the South Carolina Department of Probation, Parole, and Pardon Service office in Abbeville County received a phone call indicating that an officer had been shot. All probation agents in the state of South Carolina are fully certified law enforcement officers, with the same training and arrest powers as all other certified law enforcement officers. Probation Agent Phillip Sears and Agent-In-Charge Ed Strickland responded immediately to the scene, unaware of what had transpired on the property. As first responders to the Bixby home, Strickland and Sears canvassed the property and quickly located the body of Constable Ouzts lying on the front lawn. The agents summoned reinforcements and established a perimeter around the residence before other law enforcement officers arrived.

In the meantime, Rita Bixby was at Steven's Abbeville Arms apartment. She phoned the South Carolina Attorney General's office, leaving the following message with a secretary: "...this is Rita Bixby, and I live at 4 Union Church Road...I've talked to you before, and they have; the state has decided they were going to come in and take our property. My husband and my son are there and there is a shootout going on because they're not going to take our land. No one has approached us and asked us if they could negotiate or anything. They just simply came onto our land and started taking it and there is a shootout there." Rita then effectively took the entire apartment complex and its surroundings hostage, threatening to randomly shoot bystanders if the police harmed either her husband or her son. Rita's son Dennis was with her at the apartment.

Throughout the late morning and into the afternoon, members of various law enforcement agencies and Abbeville residents who had befriended the Bixbys attempted to negotiate with the family, to no avail. A SWAT unit came from Columbia by helicopter, followed by a South Carolina Law Enforcement Division (SLED) armored vehicle. At one point, nearly 200 law enforcement agents surrounded the Bixby residence. A constant barrage of gunfire, up to a thousand rounds of ammunition in five minutes, emanated from the small house, thwarting attempts by police to rescue Officer Wilson or capture the residence. Police were resupplied with ammunition several times in response to the heavy gunfire; media estimates have pegged the number of rounds fired in the tens of thousands. According to SLED Chief Robert Stewart, the level of gunfire from the Bixbys was worse than anything he had encountered in his 30-year career. Some Abbeville residents living over a mile from the standoff site reported hearing the continuous gunfire.

By late afternoon, SWAT officers negotiated Rita Bixby's surrender, though she refused to assist in negotiations with Arthur and Steven. Upon searching Steven's apartment and Rita's vehicle, authorities discovered numerous high-powered firearms and a large quantity of what was described as "anti-government" literature.

Around 7:15 PM, two hours after Rita's surrender, police breached the Bixbys' front door with a 10-foot steel battering ram attached to a vehicle, breaking a propane line and starting a fire, which several officers extinguished. A surveillance robot, armed with tear gas and 5X intensity pepper spray, was dispatched to the house but was unable to enter due to the large quantity of debris blocking the front door. The robot was, however, able to capture video of Wilson's handcuffed, lifeless body lying in a pool of blood. In an attempt to recover Wilson's body, a SWAT unit stormed the house; surprised by the earlier blaze, the Bixbys were caught off-guard, and they ceased firing long enough for the officers to drag the body from the house.

By 10:00 PM, after hours of constant firing from both sides and releasing over twenty canisters of tear gas and pepper spray into the nearly destroyed Bixby home, Steven Bixby surrendered to police. About an hour later, a critically wounded Arthur Bixby also surrendered and was flown to a Greenville, SC hospital, where he recovered.

Upon entering the house for the first time, officers found nine firearms, including Wilson's, and an extensive library of legal texts and articles related to militia uprisings. They also found several different wills made out by the Bixbys, and numerous suicide notes.

== Aftermath ==
Mugshot of Steven Bixby

On December 9, 2003, Steven and Rita Bixby were arraigned in Abbeville County on various charges related to the deaths of Wilson and Ouzts. Steven was charged with two counts of murder and one count of criminal conspiracy, while Rita was charged with accessory before the fact to murder, criminal conspiracy, and misprision of a felony. At arraignment, Steven said he was acting in self-defense and cited the New Hampshire motto, parts of the Constitution of New Hampshire, and some Federal law. There, he said, "I love this country. I just can't stand the bastards in it." Arthur Bixby was later arraigned on charges similar to those against Steven. Prosecutors originally planned to seek the death penalty for all three Bixbys, but on August 23, 2006, Circuit Judge Alexander Macaulay ruled that the death penalty was not an option in Rita's case, a ruling that prosecutors appealed to have overturned by the South Carolina Supreme Court. In State v. Bixby, 373 S.C. 74, 644 S.E.2d 54 (2007), the South Carolina Supreme Court affirmed the trial court's decision that Rita Bixby was ineligible for execution under South Carolina law since she was only charged with accessory before the fact of murder.

Following arraignment, Steven Bixby likened the standoff to the events at Waco and Ruby Ridge.

All three Bixbys were initially held in the Abbeville County jail, awaiting trial. For a brief period in 2005, Steven Bixby was moved to the Anderson County jail; in early 2006, he was moved again to the Lexington County jail, where he remained as of late August 2006, due to a breach of confidentiality regarding his meetings with expert witnesses in the case. Trial dates in the case were pushed back several times from their originally scheduled starts in mid-2004. One reason for the delays was the sudden death of Circuit Judge Marc Westbrook in a September 2005 traffic accident; another reason was the contest between the defense and prosecution over both the venue of the trial and the county from which a jury pool would be selected. In early 2006, Macaulay agreed with Steven Bixby's defense that it would be nearly impossible to seat a truly impartial jury of Abbeville County citizens; in July 2006, Macaulay ruled that potential jurors would come from Chesterfield County.

Steven Bixby is currently on South Carolina's death row at the Broad River Correctional Institution, in Columbia, South Carolina. On February 19, 2007, a Chesterfield County jury found Steven Bixby guilty on 17 counts, including both murders and several lesser charges of kidnapping and conspiracy. On February 21, 2007, this same jury recommended that Steven Bixby receive two death sentences for the murders and 125 years in prison for the lesser charges. Bixby was scheduled to be executed on April 22, 2007; however, the appeals process has not been exhausted. On August 16, 2010, the South Carolina Supreme Court affirmed the conviction of Steven Bixby and the death sentence (State v. Bixby, Opinion No. 26871, August 16, 2010).

While in jail, Steven Bixby wrote over 1,500 pages of letters to his girlfriend. Some of the letters, signed "chaotic patriot Steve", were admitted during his trial.

Despite initial concerns over security at the 100-year-old Abbeville County Courthouse, Eighth Circuit Judicial Solicitor Jerry Peace determined on August 29, 2006, that the trial would be held in Abbeville County. The trial began on February 14, 2007, with a jury brought in from 160 miles away.

On October 26, 2007, Rita Bixby was found guilty in Abbeville County Court of General Sessions. Judge Alexander Macauley presided over the week-long trial. Rita Bixby was found guilty by a jury of one count of conspiracy to commit murder, 1 count of accessory before the fact in the murder of Danny Wilson, and 1 count of accessory before the fact in the murder of Donnie Ouzts. The maximum penalty that could be imposed on the conspiracy count was 5 years. The accessory charge carried a minimum sentence of 30 years to life without parole. Judge Alexander Macauley sentenced Rita Bixby to 5 years in the custody of the Department of Corrections for the charge of conspiracy to commit murder. He sentenced her to life without parole on each accessory conviction. Rita Bixby made no statement to the court, only asking her attorney to advise Judge Macauley that she "is not guilty of these charges". Tearful family members of the deceased who were present for the trial embraced each other in relief at the ruling of Judge Macauley. On the date of her sentence, Rita Bixby was 75 years old.

Because Arthur Bixby had developed dementia, he was found not capable of standing trial. In July 2008, prosecutors dropped the murder charges and requested the probate court commit him indefinitely.

On February 22, 2008, South Carolina state transportation officials agreed to name a stretch of state Highway 72 in Abbeville County for Abbeville County Deputy Sheriff Danny Wilson and Abbeville County Magistrate's Constable Donnie Ouzts.

In September 2011, Arthur and Rita Bixby died of natural causes a week apart. On September 5, Arthur died at the age of 82. On September 12, Rita died of cancer at the Graham Correctional Institution. She was 79. The house was demolished in 2018. Nearly a hundred people turned out to watch the event. Today, the place where the house sat is an empty lot.

On August 17, 2010, the South Carolina Supreme Court upheld the death sentence for Steven Bixby. He remained on death row for years because the drugs used for lethal injection were unavailable during that time. The passage of Act 43 in 2021 allowed the state to resume capital punishment via electrocution or firing squad. The state resumed executions in September 2024. Bixby appealed part of his case to the Supreme Court, as of August 2024, where a stay of execution was temporarily called on March 14, 2025. Bixby, who received his death sentence in 2007, was originally the sixth and final inmate slated to receive an execution date in May, but the South Carolina Supreme Court granted Bixby an indefinite stay of execution via a 3–2 vote. That resulted in a status hearing on April 4, 2025, for mental competency hearing to assess whether he was mentally competent to be executed. Bixby's mental competency hearing was tentatively scheduled for August 2025. On September 15, 2025, he was found competent to be executed, but Bixby's lawyers appealed the ruling to the South Carolina Supreme Court. The South Carolina Supreme Court denied Bixby's appeal on September 16, 2026, paving the way for the court to set an execution date.

== See also ==
- List of death row inmates in the United States
