= Capital punishment in South Carolina =

Capital punishment is a legal penalty in the U.S. state of South Carolina. This stems from colonial-era execution starting around 1718.

There are currently 24 death row inmates as of December 24, 2024.

== History ==
Between 1718 and 2025, more than 680 people have been executed in South Carolina. Since the 1976 nationwide overturn of the ban on capital punishment, South Carolina has executed 50 people.

Between 2011 and 2024, no one had been executed in the state due to pharmaceutical companies refusing to sell the drugs needed for lethal injections. Lethal injection has been the legalized primary form of execution since 1995, while the passage of Act 43 of 2021 allowed resumption of executions by electric chair as the primary form of execution. In March 2022, the South Carolina Department of Corrections announced they were ready to carry out executions by firing squad. Inmates currently have the choice to be executed via electrocution, lethal injection or firing squad, with electrocution being the primary method.

On July 31, 2024, the Supreme Court of South Carolina ruled that the death penalty was legal, including the execution methods of electrocution and firing squad, both approved by a majority of the judges, paving the way for the potential resumption of executions. As of November 2025, a total of 24 inmates remain on death row in South Carolina.

13 years after the last execution, they resumed, with the state carrying out the death sentence of convicted killer Freddie Eugene Owens on September 20, 2024.

The first person to be executed by firing squad in the state was murderer Brad Keith Sigmon on March 7, 2025. His execution came four years after the state first introduced firing squad as an alternative method.

== Legal process ==
When the prosecution seeks the death penalty, the sentence is not passed by the judge. The sentence is decided by the jury and must be unanimous.

In case of a hung jury during the penalty phase of the trial, a life sentence is issued, even if a single juror opposed death; there is no retrial.

The Governor of South Carolina has the power of clemency with respect to death sentences.

The current methods of execution employed by the state are lethal injection, electrocution, and firing squad. Under South Carolina Code § 24-3-530(A), a person sentenced to death may elect, in writing, to be executed by electrocution, firing squad, or lethal injection, if lethal injection is available at the time of the election. The election must be made fourteen days before each execution date; if the convicted person waives the right of election, the penalty must be administered by electrocution.

On January 30, 2019, the South Carolina's Senate voted 26–13 in favor of a revived proposal to restore the electric chair and add death by firing squad to its execution options. On May 14, 2021, Governor Henry McMaster signed into law Act 43 of 2021, restoring the electric chair as the default method of execution if lethal injection was unavailable, and added the firing squad as an option upon the offender's request.

== Clemency ==
Governor Henry McMaster

Clemency is handled by the seven-member board of probation of South Carolina, not the governor. On the governor's side, they may only grant a reprieve or commute a death sentence to a sentence of life imprisonment.

Wide discretion is given to the governors commutation and deprive powers in both case law and statute. "Section 24-21-50 of the South Carolina Codes sets out the procedures of the Board. That section states that “[t]he board shall grant hearings and permit arguments and appearances by counsel or any individual before it at any such hearing while considering a case for parole, pardon, or any other form of clemency provided for under law. No prisoner has a right of confrontation at the hearing."

As of August 26, 2021, the South Carolina Governor is Republican Governor Henry McMaster, an early supporter of Donald J. Trump's presidency.

There have been no granted clemencies since 1976.

== Capital crimes ==
Murder with one of the following aggravating circumstances is the only crime punishable by death in South Carolina:

1. The murder was committed while in the commission of the following crimes or acts: criminal sexual conduct in any degree, kidnapping, trafficking in persons, burglary in any degree, robbery while armed with a deadly weapon, larceny with use of a deadly weapon, killing by poison, drug trafficking, physical torture, dismemberment of a person, or arson in the first degree.
2. The murder was committed by a person with a prior conviction for murder.
3. The offender by his act of murder knowingly created a great risk of death to more than one person in a public place by means of a weapon or device which normally would be hazardous to the lives of more than one person.
4. The offender committed the murder for himself or another for the purpose of receiving money or a thing of monetary value.
5. The murder of a judicial officer, former judicial officer, solicitor, former solicitor, or other officer of the court during or because of the exercise of his official duty.
6. The offender caused or directed another to commit murder or committed murder as an agent or employee of another person.
7. The murder of a federal, state, or local law enforcement officer or former federal, state, or local law enforcement officer, peace officer or former peace officer, corrections officer or former corrections officer, including a county or municipal corrections officer or a former county or municipal corrections officer, a county or municipal detention facility employee or former county or municipal detention facility employee, or fireman or former fireman during or because of the performance of his official duties.
8. The murder of a family member of an official listed in subitems (5) and (7) above with the intent to impede or retaliate against the official. "Family member" means a spouse, parent, brother, sister, child, or person to whom the official stands in the place of a parent or a person living in the official's household and related to him by blood or marriage.
9. Two or more persons were murdered by the defendant by one act or pursuant to one scheme or course of conduct.
10. The murder of a child eleven years of age or under.
11. The murder of a witness or potential witness committed at any time during the criminal process for the purpose of impeding or deterring prosecution of any crime.
12. The murder was committed by a person deemed a sexually violent predator pursuant to the provisions of Chapter 48, Title 44, or a person deemed a sexually violent predator who is released pursuant to Section 44-48-120.

South Carolina also provides the death penalty for criminal sexual conduct with a minor under 11 if the offender was a repeat offender, although the statute is unenforceable under Kennedy v. Louisiana

== See also ==
- List of people executed in South Carolina
- List of people executed in South Carolina (pre-1972)
- List of death row inmates in the United States § South Carolina
- Crime in South Carolina
