= William Earl Lynd =

American murderer (1955–2008)

- Born: January 25, 1955
- Died: May 6, 2008 (aged 53); Georgia Diagnostic and Classification State Prison, Georgia, U.S.
- Status: Executed by lethal injection
- Convictions: Malice murder Kidnapping
- Penalty: Death (February 27, 1990)

Details
- Victims: Ginger Moore, 26; Leslie Joan Sharkey, 42
- Date: December 23, 1988

William Earl Lynd (January 25, 1955 – May 6, 2008) was an American murderer who was executed by the state of Georgia for the 1988 murder of his then-girlfriend, Ginger Moore. He was notable for being the first person to be executed in the United States after the Baze v. Rees ruling.

== Murders ==
On December 23, 1988, Lynd and his then-girlfriend, Ginger Moore, got into a heated argument about a vacation they had been planning. Enraged, Lynd shot Moore in the face with a .32 caliber derringer pistol at their home in Berrien County, Georgia. Afterward, he sat down outside and smoked a cigarette. Moments later, Moore reappeared, having regained consciousness. Lynd shot her again a second time, and she collapsed on the front porch. He then loaded her body into the trunk of her car and drove away from the house. After stopping his car, he heard Moore making noises from the trunk. He opened the trunk and shot her a third and final time, with the third shot being fatal. Lynd would later confess to a sheriff that he was "tired of that goddamn bitch thumping around in the car."

After the murder, Lynd returned home, gathered incriminating evidence, and then drove to a remote farmhouse where he buried Moore's body. He then left the state and drove towards Ohio, where he encountered Leslie Joan Sharkey. After flashing her car and lying to her that her vehicle was damaged, Lynd shot Sharkey three times by the side of the road. Sharkey managed to escape and seek medical attention, where she was able to give an account of what happened. She died in hospital a few days later.

== Capture and trial ==
Lynd sold the murder weapon in Ohio, which authorities would later recover as evidence. He abandoned the car in Florida, which was also found by police along with incriminating evidence still left in the vehicle. Lynd eventually surrendered to Berrien County authorities.

A Berrien County jury indicted Lynd on February 7, 1989, for one count of malice murder and one count of kidnapping. On February 27, 1990, he was convicted and sentenced to death for the murder of Moore.

== Execution ==
On May 6, 2008, Lynd was put to death by lethal injection in Jackson, Georgia. His last meal was two pepper jack barbecue burgers with crispy onions, baked potatoes with sour cream, bacon and cheese, and a large strawberry milkshake. He was the first person to be executed in the United States in 2008 and the 1100th to be executed since 1976. He was pronounced dead at 7:51 p.m.

== Baze v. Rees ==
Lynd was executed over seven months after the previous execution, which had been of Michael Wayne Richard in Texas in September 2007. Following Richard's execution, the Supreme Court of the United States granted certiorari in a challenge made by death row inmates Ralph Baze and Thomas Bowling, who argued that lethal injection violated the Eighth Amendment prohibition of cruel and unusual punishment. The Supreme Court stayed all executions until the case was decided in April 2008. Following the ruling, Lynd was the first person to be executed in the United States in over seven months, marking the longest gap in executions carried out within the United States since 1982.

== See also ==
- Capital punishment in Georgia (U.S. state)
- Capital punishment in the United States
- List of people executed in Georgia (U.S. state)
- List of people executed in the United States in 2008

Preceded by First	People executed in US after Baze v. Rees ruling	Succeeded by Earl Wesley Berry
