= FBI Ten Most Wanted Fugitives, 1990s =

The FBI's Ten Most Wanted Fugitives during the 1990s is a list, maintained for a fifth decade, of the Ten Most Wanted Fugitives of the United States Federal Bureau of Investigation.

== FBI headlines in the 1990s ==
As a decade, the 1990s list stands out above others for its inclusion of a large number of highly notorious suspects, including several major terrorists, foreign and domestic. In 1993 and 1994, the FBI was scrutinized for its role in the Ruby Ridge and Waco incidents. In 1999, the most notorious suspect ever in American history, Osama bin Laden, was added to the list for the 1998 embassy attacks.

Although many 1990s terrorists have appeared on the top 10 list of fugitives, it was not until the aftermath of 9/11 in 2001 that the FBI began maintaining a separate list of Most Wanted Terrorists.

== FBI Ten Most Wanted Fugitives to begin the 1990s ==
The FBI in the past has identified individuals by the sequence number in which each individual has appeared on the list. Some individuals have even appeared twice, and often a sequence number was permanently assigned to an individual suspect who was soon caught, captured, or simply removed, before his or her appearance could be published on the publicly released list. In those cases, the public would see only gaps in the number sequence reported by the FBI. For convenient reference, the wanted suspect's sequence number and date of entry on the FBI list appear below, whenever possible.

The 1990s version of the logo previously used by the FBI as the main title for the web site page of the group of ten fugitives. This version of the logo came into use by the FBI beginning in the 1990s, and lasted at least through 1998. By 2005, it had been reworked into the modern logo now seen at the top of the group of ten fugitives page. In contrast, this early 1990s logo had appeared in the center of the group of ten fugitives on the FBI's web page, with the 10 fugitive photos and names evenly spaced all around the logo.

The following fugitives made up the top Ten list to begin the 1990s:

Name	Sequence Number	Date of Entry	Notes
Leo Joseph Koury	#366	1979	• Eluded the FBI for 12 years before dying of cerebral vascular hypertension on June 16, 1991.
Donald Eugene Webb	#375	1981	• Removed from the list on March 31, 2007. On July 14, 2017, remains found at the Dartmouth, Massachusetts home of Webb's wife were identified as belonging to Webb. Investigators stated that Webb had died in 1999.
Victor Manuel Gerena	#386	1984	• Still at large in the theft of $7 million from a Connecticut securities firm, but removed from the list on December 15, 2016.
Claude Daniel Marks	#411	1987	• Surrendered December 6, 1994 with Donna Jean Willmott
Donna Jean Willmott	#412	1987	• Surrendered December 6, 1994 with Claude Daniel Marks
Armando Garcia	#423	1989	• Arrested January 18, 1994 after being featured on America's Most Wanted.
Melvin Edward Mays	#424	1989	• Arrested March 9, 1995
Arthur Lee Washington Jr.	#427	1989	• Removed from the list in December 2000 for no longer meeting the list criteria. He is currently still at large, though has been presumed to be deceased.
Wardell David Ford	#429	1989	• Arrested September 17, 1990

One spot on the list of ten remained unfilled from a capture late in the year 1989. It was filled in the first month of the last year of the decade in 1990.

Red and black headers used by the FBI on 1990s top ten wanted posters. This red and black 1990s version of the headers appeared on FBI wanted posters with blue text in the upper left corner reading "FBI Fugitive Publicity." These two headers were replaced by the modern blue border version of the poster header some time before 2002.

== FBI Ten Most Wanted Fugitives added during the 1990s ==
The list of the most wanted fugitives listed during the 1990s fluctuated throughout the decade with some fugitives making reappearances on the list. In 1992, there were no additions made by the FBI to the list, for the second time in its history. As before, spots on the list were occupied by fugitives who had been listed in prior years, and still remained at large. The list includes (in FBI list appearance sequence order):

=== 1990 ===
Name	Sequence Number	Date of Entry	Time Listed
Leslie Isben Rogge	#430	January 24, 1990	Six years
Leslie Isben Rogge stole more than $2 million and possibly robbed more than 25 banks. He is currently serving a 65-year sentence at Federal Correctional Institution in Sheridan, Oregon. He surrendered May 19, 1996 to Guatemalan authorities. Was featured on Unsolved Mysteries.
Kenneth Robert Stanton	#431	October 24, 1990	Seven days
Kenneth Robert Stanton was being hunted for molesting 11 underage girls after he went to their homes, gained their trust by pretending to be a police officer and showing a fake badge. He was captured October 31, 1990 by FBI and York County Sheriff's Department. He was featured on Unsolved Mysteries where over 150 viewers called in tips which lead to his arrest.
Patrick Michael Mitchell	#432	November 23, 1990	Four years
Patrick Michael Mitchell was leader of the "Stopwatch Gang", that robbed multiple banks across Canada and the United States. He was captured February 22, 1994 in Southaven, Mississippi and was imprisoned in the U.S. from 1994 until his death from cancer in 2007. He robbed the Deposit Guaranty Bank, Mississippi in February 1994.

=== 1991 ===
Name	Sequence Number	Date of Entry	Time Listed
Jon Preston Settle	#433	August 9, 1991	Never published
Jon Preston Settle was wanted for his involvement in the murders of Andre Armstrong, James Brown, Lorretha Anderson, and her daughter, Chemise English, who was 2-years-old, at a crack house. Anderson's 18-month-old son, Carlos English, was wounded in the attack but survived. He was one of twelve who planned the murders which came about due to a disagreement over distribution of cocaine in Pacoima. The men were locked in metal cages and shot while Anderson, her son, and daughter were in a nearby car when one of his accomplices shot them. He was arrested August 6, 1991 (before being published to the list) in Los Angeles.
Robert Michael Allen	#434	September 13, 1991	One year, 3 months
Robert Michael Allen was wanted for stalking and shooting his former employer, movie producer Roland Emr and his son at a Culver City intersection in 1991. When the police went to notify Emr's father, they found him dead as well in a closet. The motive was believed to be that Allen was cheated out of a producing deal with Emr. He was found dead on December 23, 1992, in the California desert by three hikers alongside the bones of his girlfriend, Susan Lynn Calkins, who police believe he also killed.

=== 1992 ===
No one was added to the list in 1992.

=== 1993 ===
Name	Sequence Number	Date of Entry	Time Listed
Mir Qazi	#435	February 9, 1993	Four years
Mir Qazi, known by the FBI under the name Mir Aimal Kansi, was executed on November 14, 2002, by lethal injection in a Virginia state prison. Qazi was a fugitive in Afghanistan and Pakistan before being arrested after he was turned in by an informant, at his hotel in Dera Ghazi Khan, central Pakistan on June 17, 1997. He was wanted in the murder case of two CIA employees outside CIA headquarters at Langley, Virginia on January 25, 1993, during which three others were also shot and injured in their cars at the intersection.
Ramzi Ahmed Yousef	#436	April 21, 1993	Two years
Ramzi Ahmed Yousef is imprisoned at the federal supermax prison in Florence, Colorado. He was convicted on November 12, 1997; sentenced to life January 8, 1998 of planning and execution of the 1993 WTC bombing in Manhattan, the mastermind behind the bombing. He was arrested in Pakistan February 7, 1995. Yousef had fled Manila, Philippines after the foiled Bojinka plot February 6, 1995 to bomb 11 U.S. airliners. He is the nephew of captured 9/11 mastermind Khalid Shaikh Mohammed. Also known as Abdul Mahmud Abdul Karim Basit.

=== 1994 ===
Name	Sequence Number	Date of Entry	Time Listed
Joseph Martin Luther Gardner	#437	May 25, 1994	Five months
Joseph Martin Luther Gardner was wanted for kidnapping, raping, and killing 25-year-old Melissa McLauchlin alongside two other accomplices. He was arrested on October 19, 1994, in Philadelphia. He remained incarcerated until he was executed in South Carolina, on December 5, 2008.
Gary Ray Bowles	#438	November 19, 1994	Three days
Gary Ray Bowles was arrested on November 22, 1994, in Jacksonville Beach, Florida as a suspect in multiple murders. Bowles had been a drifter in and out of prison since 1981, and was arrested in Atlanta in August 1986. He was executed for his crimes on August 22, 2019, at Florida State Prison.

=== 1995 ===
Name	Sequence Number	Date of Entry	Time Listed
Gerald Keith Watkins	#439	March 4, 1995	Two months
Gerald Keith Watkins was wanted for killing his girlfriend, Beth Ann Anderson, her 9-year-old son, Kevin Kelley, and the couple's two week old daughter, Melanie Watkins, in Pennsylvania. Watkins was sentenced to death in Pennsylvania on December 13, 1996.
Juan García Ábrego	#440	March 9, 1995	Nine months
Juan García Ábrego has been imprisoned in U.S. since 1996. Currently imprisoned at Hazelton USP in West Virginia. Sentenced to 11 life terms on January 31, 1997; Convicted in Houston United States District Court for the Southern District of Texas October 16, 1996 of 22 counts of drug trafficking charges; Expelled to US by Mexico January 15, 1996; Arrested January 14, 1996 in Monterrey, Mexico; Indictment amended in 1996; Wanted on multiple murder charges in Mexico by 1995; Warrant issued and indicted September 1993 in Houston; Indicted in Dallas, Texas federal United States District Court for the Northern District of Texas in 1990. Wanted in US on drug conspiracy charges since 1986. He was the founder and drug boss of the Gulf Cartel, a drug trafficking organization in Mexico, before in arrest.
Abdelbaset al-Megrahi	#441	March 23, 1995	Four years
Abdelbaset al-Megrahi, a Libyan national imprisoned in Scotland, whose murder conviction was upheld by appeals court in March 2002. Sentenced to life in prison with possibility of parole after 20 years; convicted January 31, 2001; arrested in the Netherlands April 5, 1999. He was charged in part with "Conspiracy to Destroy a Civil Aircraft of the United States"; was wanted in the December 21, 1988 mass murder bombing of Pan Am Flight 103 over Lockerbie, Scotland, which killed 259 passengers and crew members and 11 Lockerbie villagers, including nationals of the United States; Libyan intelligence agent, under cover as Chief of Airline Security for Libyan Arab Airlines. He was released on August 20, 2009, and allowed to return to Libya by the Scottish Government on compassionate grounds following doctors reporting on the August 10, 2009 that he had terminal prostate cancer and had less than three months to live. He died in Tripoli, Libya on May 20, 2012.
Lamin Khalifah Fhimah	#442	March 23, 1995	Four years
Lamin Khalifah Fhimah was acquitted in Scotland January 31, 2001. He was arrested in the Netherlands April 5, 1999; charged in part with "Conspiracy to Destroy a Civil Aircraft of the United States" and wanted in the December 21, 1988 mass murder bombing of Pan Am Flight 103 over Lockerbie, Scotland which killed 259 passengers and crew members and 11 Lockerbie villagers, including nationals of the United States.
O'Neil Vassell	#443	July 15, 1995	One year
O'Neil Vassell is a US prisoner arrested on October 16, 1996, in Brooklyn, New York. He was wanted on 3 first-degree murder counts from June and July 1993 murders of three individuals in the Bridgeport, Connecticut area. Vassell had a history of assaults and drug charges; was a known member of the "RATs" Jamaican drug posse, was a drug user and had been known to carry a 9mm semi-automatic handgun.
Rickey Allen Bright	#444	December 15, 1995	Three weeks
Rickey Allen Bright is a US prisoner who was arrested on January 7, 1996, in Nashville, Tennessee. He was wanted in the kidnapping and rape of a 9-year-old Wilkes County, North Carolina girl in October 1995; paroled after 13 years in January 1995 from North Carolina prison; was turned down twice for parole; sentenced to 15-to-life in North Carolina prison in 1981; was wanted in kidnapping and attempted rape of a 7-year-old girl in Gastonia, North Carolina in 1979.

=== 1996 ===
Name	Sequence Number	Date of Entry	Time Listed
Agustín Vásquez Mendoza	#445	August 3, 1996	Four years
Agustín Vásquez Mendoza has been imprisoned since 2000 in Maricopa County, Arizona. He was arrested in Mexico July 9, 2000 for unlawful flight after being indicted in Phoenix, Arizona July 11, 1994 in murder of an undercover DEA special agent in Glendale, Arizona on June 30, 1994, during an undercover drug transaction, kidnapping, attempted armed robbery and assault in a drug conspiracy.
Thang Thanh Nguyen	#446	August 3, 1996	One year
Thang Thanh Nguyen has been imprisoned in U.S. since 1998 after being extradited to Rochester, New York January 6, 1998 from Bangkok, Thailand He was turned over to the FBI and transported from Vietnam; was arrested December 22, 1997 in Bac Lieu, Vietnam. Nguyen was charged by FBI with unlawful flight July 14, 1992 following an arrest warrant for his indictment in Monroe County, New York July 9, 1992; for an in home-invasion robbery and murder of his former employer, a Vietnamese businessman in Irondequoit, New York January 26, 1992.
Glen Stewart Godwin	#447	December 7, 1996	Still at large but removed from the list
Glen Stewart Godwin is being sought for his 1987 escape from Folsom State Prison in California, where he was serving a lengthy sentence for murder. Later he escaped from Mexican prison September 1991; murdered an inmate in Mexican prison April 1991; sentenced to prison in Guadalajara, Mexico in 1987. He was convicted for drug trafficking in Mexico in 1987; arrested for drug trafficking in Puerto Vallarta, Mexico in 1987; escaped from Folsom prison June 30, 1987 through a storm drain. As of May 19, 2016 he was no longer on the list.
David Alex Alvarez	#448	December 14, 1996	Five months
David Alex Alvarez is a Mexican prisoner who was arrested on May 20, 1997, in Tijuana, Mexico. He was wanted in murder of four people, including two young girls, and wounding of three other people, at Baldwin Park, California September 29, 1996. He was also wanted in a kidnapping in California, August 1996. He was paroled in 1994 after being sentenced to five years in 1992 following a conviction of battery and assault with a firearm in 1992.

=== 1997 ===
Name	Sequence Number	Date of Entry	Time Listed
Andrew Phillip Cunanan	#449	June 12, 1997	One month
Andrew Phillip Cunanan committed suicide in a German millionaire's houseboat on Indian Creek Canal in Miami Beach, Florida July 23, 1997. He was wanted in shooting murder of fashion designer Gianni Versace outside his Miami Beach house July 15, 1997. Arrived in Miami Beach on May 10, 1997; wanted in shooting murder of Finn's Point Cemetery worker in Pennsville, New Jersey May 9, 1997; wanted in torture and stabbing murder of Chicago, Illinois real-estate developer Lee Miglin at his home May 3, 1997; wanted in shooting murder of another partner near Duluth, Minnesota around April 29, 1997; wanted in bludgeoning murder of partner in Minneapolis, Minnesota April 27, 1997.
Paul Ragusa	#450	September 6, 1997	Four months
Paul Ragusa has been imprisoned in the U.S. since 1998. He was arrested on January 30, 1998, in New York. He had cosmetic surgery in 1997 following an indictment on racketeering charges June 14, 1996. He was wanted in shooting of two security guards at a Chemical Bank branch in Maspeth, Queens, June 23, 1993; beating a burglar with a baseball bat on Fresh Pond Road in Ridgewood, New York in 1990 (charges were dropped in the beating case); beating a stranger in a van in the face with a stick in Ridgewood, New York in March 1989.
Ramón Eduardo Arellano-Félix	#451	September 18, 1997	Five years
Ramón Eduardo Arellano-Félix was killed in a gun battle with police at Mazatlán February 10, 2002. He was wanted in ordering a hit which resulted in the mass murder of 19 people in Ensenada September 17, 1998; charged in a sealed indictment in United States District Court for the Southern District of California, with Conspiracy to Import Cocaine and Marijuana in drug trafficking; one of the leaders of the Arellano-Felix Organization (AFO), which is also known as the Tijuana Cartel.

=== 1998 ===
Name	Sequence Number	Date of Entry	Time Listed
Tony Ray Amati	#452	February 21, 1998	Four days
Tony Ray Amati has been imprisoned in the U.S. since 1998. He was arrested on February 25, 1998, in Marietta, Georgia; wanted on federal warrant for Unlawful Flight December 1997; wanted in Las Vegas for three handgun murders May–August 1996.
Harry Joseph Bowman	#453	March 14, 1998	One year
Harry Joseph "Taco" Bowman was imprisoned in the U.S. from 1999, after being arrested June 7, 1999 in Sterling Heights, Michigan, until his death in 2019. Indicted in Tampa in August 1997 for three murders; wanted in murder of an Outlaws member in Indiana in 1995; indicted for having ordered bombings of rival clubhouses in Orlando and in Cook County, Illinois in 1994; wanted in the murder of rival club member in Edgewater, Florida in 1991; wanted in the murder of an Outlaws member in Ormond Beach, Florida in 1982; former international president of the Outlaws Motorcycle Club in more than 30 cities in the United States and some 20 chapters in at least four other countries.
Eric Robert Rudolph	#454	May 5, 1998	Five years
Eric Robert Rudolph, a U.S. prisoner, was arrested in Murphy, North Carolina, May 31, 2003. He was charged on October 14, 1998, in a series of southeastern US bombings. Before being arrested, his last known contact was with a Mr. Nordman, and stole his pickup and supplies, 1998; his pickup was found abandoned at Murphy, North Carolina February 8, 1998; wanted in a bombing murder and maiming at a Birmingham abortion clinic January 29, 1998; wanted in a double bombing at a nightclub in Atlanta February 21, 1997; wanted in bombing at Atlanta family planning clinic January 29, 1997; wanted in a double bombing at office building in north Atlanta on January 16, 1997; wanted in a bombing murder at Centennial Olympic Park in Atlanta, July 27, 1996.

=== 1999 ===
Name	Sequence Number	Date of Entry	Time Listed
James Charles Kopp	#455	June 7, 1999	Two years
James Charles Kopp, a U.S. prisoner, was arrested in Dinan, Brittany, France, March 30, 2001. He was wanted for the murder of Dr. Barnett Slepian at his home in Amherst, New York, October 23, 1998 and for non-fatal shootings of three doctors in Canada in 1994, 1995 and 1997. Kopp was indicted in federal court in October 2000 for use of deadly force and indicted in NY state in June 1999 for second-degree murder; his 1987 Chevrolet Cavalier was found abandoned at Newark International Airport December 18, 1998 after he initially disappeared on November 3, 1998.
Usama Bin Laden; Full name: Osama bin Mohammed bin Awad bin Laden; Arabic: أسامة بن محمد بن عوض بن لادن	#456	June 7, 1999	11 years, 10 months, 23 days
Osama bin Laden was the leader of al-Qaeda and was wanted in connection with the August 7, 1998, bombings of the United States embassies, Dar es Salaam, Tanzania, and Nairobi, Kenya. Bin Laden and al-Qaeda is alleged to be responsible for the October 12, 2000, attack on the USS Cole off the coast of Yemen. Although bin Laden later appeared on the first publicly released FBI Most Wanted Terrorists list on October 10, 2001, he was listed there for his alleged role in the 1998 embassy attack, and not for his alleged role in the September 11, 2001 terrorist attacks. Osama bin Laden was the subject of a $50 million reward through the State Department's Rewards for Justice program.^{[a]} Osama bin Laden was killed during Operation Neptune Spear in Abbottābad, Pakistan, on May 2, 2011.
Ángel Maturino Reséndiz	#457	June 21, 1999	Three weeks
Ángel Maturino Reséndiz a.k.a. Rafael Resendez-Ramirez was executed June 27, 2006 in Huntsville, Texas by lethal injection. He was arrested July 13, 1999 in Houston; wanted for murders as "The Railway Killer" in Jackson County, Illinois, June 15, 1999; murder in Houston, Texas, June 5, 1999; murder in Fayette County, Texas, June 4, 1999; double murder in Weimar, Texas, April 30, 1999; murder in West University, Texas, December 17, 1998; murder in Lexington, Kentucky, August 29, 1997.
James J. Bulger	#458	August 19, 1999	11 years, 10 months, 3 days
James J. Bulger was wanted for his role in 19 murders committed from the early 1970s through the mid-1980s in connection with his leadership of an Irish organized crime group that allegedly controlled extortion, drug deals, and other illegal activities in the Boston, Massachusetts area. He had a violent temper and was known to carry a knife at all times. After his arrest on June 22, 2011, in Santa Monica, California, Bulger was detained in Federal prison until his death in 2018.

== End of the decade ==
As the decade closed, the following were still at large as the Ten Most Wanted Fugitives:

Name	Sequence number	Date of entry
Donald Eugene Webb	#375	May 4, 1981
Victor Manuel Gerena	#386	May 14, 1984
Arthur Lee Washington Jr.	#427	Oct 18, 1989
Agustín Vásquez Mendoza	#445	Aug 3, 1996
Glen Stewart Godwin	#447	Dec 7, 1996
Ramón Arellano Félix	#451	Sep 18, 1997
Eric Robert Rudolph	#454	May 5, 1998
James Charles Kopp	#455	Jun 7, 1999
Usama Bin Laden; AKA: Osama bin Laden; Arabic: أسامة بن محمد بن عوض بن لادن	#456	Jun 7, 1999
James J. Bulger	#458	Aug 19, 1999

== FBI directors in the 1990s ==
- William S. Sessions (1987–1993)
- Floyd I. Clarke (1993)
- Louis J. Freeh (1993–2001)
