= Richard Cooey =

American murderer (1967–2008)

- Born: June 9, 1967; Akron, Ohio, U.S.
- Died: October 14, 2008 (aged 41); Southern Ohio Correctional Facility, Ohio, U.S.
- Known for: Arguing that he was too obese to be executed
- Status: Executed by lethal injection
- Convictions: Aggravated murder (2 counts); Kidnapping (2 counts); Rape (4 counts); Aggravated robbery (2 counts); Felonious assault
- Penalty: Death

Richard Wade Cooey II (June 9, 1967 – October 14, 2008) was an American murderer. With Clinton Dickens, he was responsible for the murders of 21-year-old Wendy Offredo and 20-year-old Dawn McCreery in Akron, Ohio, on September 1, 1986. He became notable for his argument that, with his weight of over 275 lb (125 kg), he was too obese to be executed – an argument ultimately rejected by the courts.

== Youth ==
Cooey was born in Akron, Ohio. He lived in Stow with his parents until they divorced when he was 11. He spent his junior high years and high school years between Stow, with his father, and Akron, with his paternal grandmother. Cooey graduated from Stow High School in 1985 and enlisted in the U.S. Army. The following summer, he returned on leave.

== Case ==
Early on the morning of September 1, 1986, Cooey, Dickens and Kenneth Horonetz Jr. were throwing chunks of concrete off the Stoner Street Bridge onto U.S. Interstate 77 in Akron. One of the chunks thrown by Dickens struck the vehicle of a University of Akron student, 21-year-old Wendy Offredo. Also in the vehicle was another student, 20-year-old Dawn McCreery.

Pretending to rescue both students, the two men actually ended up kidnapping them. Cooey, then age 19, and Dickens, age 17, took the women to a field behind the Rolling Acres Mall where they raped, stabbed, and tortured them for three and a half hours, eventually choking and bludgeoning them to death and abandoning the bodies. They also carved X's into the victims' abdomens. Cooey and Dickens each blamed the other for the actual murders, Horonetz having left the car before the violence began. Cooey bragged about the murders to close friends and was eventually turned in to authorities. He was convicted on November 14, 1986, and sentenced to death. Dickens, who was a minor at the time of the murders, could not be sentenced to death under Ohio laws, and as of 2024 is serving a life sentence in prison. Horonetz, then age 18, and another suspect, Terry Grant, age 19, were charged with obstruction of justice in the case for participating in the destruction of evidence. Grant was sentenced to two years' probation. Horonetz was released on parole after serving one year of a three-to-fifteen year prison sentence for felonious assault. Cooey later claimed that he did not kill or beat anyone. He admitted to raping the women, claiming he did "rape under duress". He also stated that he was under the influence of alcohol and illegal drugs, such as cocaine and opium, at the time.

== Execution ==
Cooey was confined at the Southern Ohio Correctional Facility. He was originally scheduled to be executed on July 24, 2003, but the execution was stayed to allow further investigation of his case. In February 2005 he attempted to escape.

Cooey argued that his obesity rendered lethal injection an inhumane form of execution because (he claimed) his clogged veins would prevent the first drug administered during the execution – meant to render the prisoner insensible – from having full effect. He also claimed that prison food was responsible for his obesity. The argument was rejected and he was executed on October 14, 2008.

== See also ==
- Capital punishment in Ohio
- Capital punishment in the United States
- List of people executed in Ohio
- List of people executed in the United States in 2008

== General references ==
- Mears, Bill (October 14, 2008), Inmate executed after Supreme Court rejects obese argument, CNN
- Beyerlein, Tom (2008-10-12), Inmate scheduled to die 22 years after murder, Dayton Daily News

Preceded by Jessie Cummings	People executed in US after Baze v. Rees ruling	Succeeded by Alvin Kelly
