= List of people executed in the United States in 2008 =

Thirty-seven people were executed in the United States in 2008. Eighteen of them were in the state of Texas. One (James Earl Reed) was executed via electrocution. Executions were not carried out in the United States between September 2007 and April 2008, due to certiorari in Baze v. Rees, which questioned the constitutionality of lethal injection. The U.S. Supreme Court stayed all executions for seven months until a decision was made, meaning executions did not begin until May, with none having taken place since that of Michael Wayne Richard the previous September.

== List of people executed in the United States in 2008 ==
No.	Date of execution	Name	Age of person			Gender	Ethnicity	State	Method	Ref.
No.	Date of execution	Name	At execution	At offense	Age difference	Gender	Ethnicity	State	Method	Ref.
1	May 6, 2008	William Earl Lynd	53	33	20	Male	White	Georgia	Lethal injection	
2	May 21, 2008	Earl Wesley Berry	49	28	21	Male	White	Mississippi	Lethal injection	
3	May 27, 2008	Kevin Green	31	21	10	Male	Black	Virginia	Lethal injection	
4	June 4, 2008	Curtis Osborne	38	20	18	Male	Black	Georgia	Lethal injection	
5	June 6, 2008	David Mark Hill	48	36	12	Male	White	South Carolina	Lethal injection	
6	June 11, 2008	Karl Eugene Chamberlain	37	21	16	Male	White	Texas	Lethal injection	
7	June 17, 2008	Terry Lyn Short	47	34	13	Male	White	Oklahoma	Lethal injection	
8	June 20, 2008	James Earl Reed	49	35	14	Male	Black	South Carolina	Electrocution	
9	June 25, 2008	Robert Stacy Yarbrough	30	18	12	Male	Black	Oklahoma	Lethal injection	
10	July 1, 2008	Mark Dean Schwab	39	22	17	Male	White	Florida	Lethal injection	
11	July 10, 2008	Carlton Akee Turner	29	19	10	Male	Black	Texas	Lethal injection	
12	July 10, 2008	Kent Jermaine Jackson	26	18	8	Male	Black	Virginia	Lethal injection	
13	July 23, 2008	Dale Leo Bishop	34	25	9	Male	White	Mississippi	Lethal injection	
14	July 23, 2008	Derrick J. Sonnier	40	23	17	Male	Black	Texas	Lethal injection	
15	July 24, 2008	Christopher Scott Emmett	36	29	7	Male	White	Virginia	Lethal injection	
16	July 31, 2008	Larry Donnell Davis	40	27	13	Male	Black	Texas	Lethal injection	
17	August 5, 2008	José Ernesto Medellín Rojas	33	18	15	Male	Hispanic	Texas	Lethal injection	
18	August 7, 2008	Heliberto Chi	29	22	7	Male	Hispanic	Texas	Lethal injection	
19	August 12, 2008	Leon David Dorsey IV	32	18	14	Male	Black	Texas	Lethal injection	
20	August 14, 2008	Michael Anthony Rodriguez	45	38	7	Male	Hispanic	Texas	Lethal injection	
21	September 16, 2008	Jack Edward Alderman	57	23	34	Male	White	Georgia	Lethal injection	
22	September 17, 2008	William Alfred Murray	39	28	11	Male	White	Texas	Lethal injection	
23	September 23, 2008	Richard Henyard	34	18	16	Male	Black	Florida	Lethal injection	
24	September 25, 2008	Jesse James Cummings Jr.	52	35	17	Male	White	Oklahoma	Lethal injection	
25	October 14, 2008	Richard Wade Cooey II	41	19	22	Male	White	Ohio	Lethal injection	
26	October 14, 2008	Alvin Andrew Kelly	57	33	24	Male	White	Texas	Lethal injection	
27	October 16, 2008	Kevin Michael Watts	27	21	6	Male	Black	Texas	Lethal injection	
28	October 21, 2008	Joseph Ray Ries	29	19	10	Male	White	Texas	Lethal injection	
29	October 28, 2008	Eric Charles Nenno	47	33	14	Male	White	Texas	Lethal injection	
30	October 30, 2008	Gregory Edward Wright	42	31	11	Male	White	Texas	Lethal injection	
31	November 6, 2008	Elkie Lee Taylor	46	31	15	Male	Black	Texas	Lethal injection	
32	November 12, 2008	George H. Whitaker III	37	23	14	Male	Black	Texas	Lethal injection	
33	November 13, 2008	Denard Sha Manns	42	32	10	Male	Black	Texas	Lethal injection	
34	November 19, 2008	Gregory L. Bryant-Bey	53	37	16	Male	Black	Ohio	Lethal injection	
35	November 20, 2008	Robert Jean Hudson	45	36	9	Male	Black	Texas	Lethal injection	
36	November 21, 2008	Marco Allen Chapman	37	30	7	Male	White	Kentucky	Lethal injection	
37	December 5, 2008	Joseph Martin Luther Gardner	38	22	16	Male	Black	South Carolina	Lethal injection	
		Average:	40 years	26 years	14 years					

== Demographics ==
Gender
Male	37	100%
Female	0	0%
Ethnicity
Black	17	46%
White	17	46%
Hispanic	3	8%
State
Texas	18	49%
Georgia	3	8%
Oklahoma	3	8%
South Carolina	3	8%
Virginia	3	8%
Florida	2	5%
Mississippi	2	5%
Ohio	2	5%
Kentucky	1	3%
Method
Lethal injection	36	97%
Electrocution	1	3%
Month
January	0	0%
February	0	0%
March	0	0%
April	0	0%
May	3	8%
June	6	16%
July	7	19%
August	4	11%
September	4	11%
October	6	16%
November	6	16%
December	1	3%
Age
20–29	5	14%
30–39	14	38%
40–49	13	35%
50–59	5	14%
Total	37	100%

== Executions in recent years ==
Number of executions
2009	52
2008	37
2007	42
Total	131

== See also ==
- List of death row inmates in the United States
- List of most recent executions by jurisdiction
- List of people scheduled to be executed in the United States
- List of women executed in the United States since 1976

Preceded by 2007	List of people executed in the United States in 2008	Succeeded by 2009
