= Isben =

Isben may refer to:

- Henrik Ibsen, a major 19th-century Norwegian playwright, theatre director, and poet
- Leslie Isben Rogge, an American criminal
- Sharon Isbin, an American classical guitarist
