= List of people executed in the United States in 2007 =

Forty-two people were executed in the United States in 2007. Twenty-six of them were in the state of Texas. One (Daryl Keith Holton) was executed via electrocution. Holton, who waived his appeals and chose the electric chair, was the first person to be electrocuted by the state of Tennessee since 1960. The state of South Dakota carried out its first execution since 1947. In September 2007, executions in the United States were halted, due to certiorari in Baze v. Rees, which questioned the constitutionality of lethal injection. The U.S. Supreme Court stayed all executions until a decision was made. The stay was not lifted until May 2008.

== List of people executed in the United States in 2007 ==
No.	Date of execution	Name	Age of person			Gender	Ethnicity	State	Method	Ref.
No.	Date of execution	Name	At execution	At offense	Age difference	Gender	Ethnicity	State	Method	Ref.
1	January 9, 2007	Corey Duane Hamilton	38	23	15	Male	Black	Oklahoma	Lethal injection	
2	January 10, 2007	Carlos Alberto Granados	36	27	9	Male	Hispanic	Texas	Lethal injection	
3	January 17, 2007	Johnathan Bryant Moore	32	20	12	Male	White	Texas	Lethal injection	
4	January 30, 2007	Christopher Jay Swift	31	28	3	Male	White	Texas	Lethal injection	
5	February 7, 2007	James Lewis Jackson	47	37	10	Male	Black	Texas	Lethal injection	
6	February 22, 2007	Newton Burton Anderson	30	22	8	Male	White	Texas	Lethal injection	
7	February 27, 2007	Donald Anthony Miller	44	19	25	Male	White	Texas	Lethal injection	
8	March 6, 2007	Robert Anthony Martinez Perez	48	35	13	Male	Hispanic	Texas	Lethal injection	
9	March 7, 2007	Joseph Bennard Nichols	45	19	26	Male	Black	Texas	Lethal injection	
10	March 20, 2007	Charles Anthony Nealy	42	33	9	Male	Black	Texas	Lethal injection	
11	March 28, 2007	Vincent Gutierrez	28	18	10	Male	Hispanic	Texas	Lethal injection	
12	March 29, 2007	Roy Lee Pippin	51	39	12	Male	White	Texas	Lethal injection	
13	April 11, 2007	James Lee Clark	38	25	13	Male	White	Texas	Lethal injection	
14	April 24, 2007	James J. Filiaggi	41	28	13	Male	White	Ohio	Lethal injection	
15	April 26, 2007	Ryan Heath Dickson	30	18	12	Male	White	Texas	Lethal injection	
16	May 3, 2007	Aaron Lee Jones	55	26	29	Male	Black	Alabama	Lethal injection	
17	May 4, 2007	David Leon Woods	42	19	23	Male	White	Indiana	Lethal injection	
18	May 9, 2007	Philip Ray Workman	53	28	25	Male	White	Tennessee	Lethal injection	
19	May 16, 2007	Charles Edward Smith	41	22	19	Male	White	Texas	Lethal injection	
20	May 22, 2007	Robert Charles Comer	50	30	20	Male	White	Arizona	Lethal injection	
21	May 24, 2007	Christopher J. Newton	37	32	5	Male	White	Ohio	Lethal injection	
22	June 6, 2007	Michael Durwood Griffith	56	44	12	Male	White	Texas	Lethal injection	
23	June 15, 2007	Michael Allen Lambert	36	20	16	Male	White	Indiana	Lethal injection	
24	June 20, 2007	Lionell Gonzales Rodriguez	36	19	17	Male	Hispanic	Texas	Lethal injection	
25	June 21, 2007	Gilberto Guadalupe Reyes	33	24	9	Male	Hispanic	Texas	Lethal injection	
26	June 22, 2007	Calvin Alphonso Shuler	40	31	9	Male	Black	South Carolina	Lethal injection	
27	June 26, 2007	Jimmy Dale Bland	49	39	10	Male	White	Oklahoma	Lethal injection	
28	June 26, 2007	Patrick Bryan Knight	39	23	16	Male	White	Texas	Lethal injection	
29	June 26, 2007	John Washington Hightower	63	43	20	Male	Black	Georgia	Lethal injection	
30	July 11, 2007	Elijah Page	25	18	7	Male	White	South Dakota	Lethal injection	
31	July 24, 2007	Lonnie Earl Johnson	44	27	17	Male	Black	Texas	Lethal injection	
32	July 26, 2007	Darrell B. Grayson	46	19	27	Male	Black	Alabama	Lethal injection	
33	August 15, 2007	Kenneth Parr	27	18	9	Male	Black	Texas	Lethal injection	
34	August 21, 2007	Frank Duane Welch	46	25	21	Male	White	Oklahoma	Lethal injection	
35	August 22, 2007	Johnny Ray Conner	32	23	9	Male	Black	Texas	Lethal injection	
36	August 23, 2007	Luther Jerome Williams	47	28	19	Male	Black	Alabama	Lethal injection	
37	August 28, 2007	DaRoyce Lamont Mosley	32	19	13	Male	Black	Texas	Lethal injection	
38	August 29, 2007	John Joe Amador	32	18	12	Male	Hispanic	Texas	Lethal injection	
39	September 5, 2007	Tony Roach	30	21	9	Male	White	Texas	Lethal injection	
40	September 12, 2007	Daryl Keith Holton	45	36	9	Male	White	Tennessee	Electrocution	
41	September 20, 2007	Clifford Allan Kimmel	32	23	9	Male	White	Texas	Lethal injection	
42	September 25, 2007	Michael Wayne Richard	48	26	22	Male	Black	Texas	Lethal injection	
		Average:	40 years	26 years	14 years					

== Demographics ==
Gender
Male	42	100%
Female	0	0%
Ethnicity
White	22	52%
Black	14	33%
Hispanic	6	14%
State
Texas	26	62%
Alabama	3	7%
Oklahoma	3	7%
Indiana	2	5%
Ohio	2	5%
Tennessee	2	5%
Arizona	1	2%
Georgia	1	2%
South Carolina	1	2%
South Dakota	1	2%
Method
Lethal injection	41	98%
Electrocution	1	2%
Month
January	4	10%
February	3	7%
March	5	12%
April	3	7%
May	6	14%
June	8	19%
July	3	7%
August	6	14%
September	4	10%
October	0	0%
November	0	0%
December	0	0%
Age
20–29	3	7%
30–39	17	40%
40–49	16	38%
50–59	5	12%
60–69	1	2%
Total	42	100%

== Executions in recent years ==
Number of executions
2008	37
2007	42
2006	53
Total	132

== See also ==
- List of death row inmates in the United States
- List of most recent executions by jurisdiction
- List of people scheduled to be executed in the United States
- List of women executed in the United States since 1976

Preceded by 2006	List of people executed in the United States in 2007	Succeeded by 2008
