= Earl Wesley Berry =

American murderer (1959–2008)

- Born: May 5, 1959; Mississippi, U.S.
- Died: May 21, 2008 (aged 49); Mississippi State Penitentiary, Mississippi, U.S.
- Status: Executed by lethal injection
- Convictions: Capital murder Kidnapping; Simple assault on a law enforcement officer Escape; Burglary; Perjury
- Penalty: Death (October 28, 1988 & June 25, 1992)

Details
- Date apprehended: December 6, 1987

Earl Wesley Berry (May 5, 1959 – May 21, 2008) was an American convicted kidnapper and murderer. He was on Mississippi's death row with 64 others but was issued a stay of execution in October 2007 by the U.S. Supreme Court. He was ultimately executed on May 21, 2008.

== Early life ==
Based on court testimony, Berry was a disturbed suicidal young man who reportedly attempted to swallow a razor blade at one time, and who had spent time in mental institutions for paranoid schizophrenia. His IQ was estimated to be well below average.

== Criminal record ==
Berry had seven prior convictions between 1979 and 1981: two escapes, two grand larceny convictions, perjury, burglary, and simple assault on a law enforcement officer.

During early 1979, Berry was stopped in Maben, MS by then Chief of Police Jimmy McLemore for a traffic offense. During the stop, McLemore attempted to take Berry into custody. A fight ensued with Berry being shot in the stomach, arm and a ricochet to the back of the neck as he attempted to flee. (Berry v. McLemore, US Court of Appeals, Fifth Circuit No.81-4106).

== Murder and trial ==
Berry was convicted and sentenced to death by a Chickasaw County jury for the November 29, 1987, murder of Mary Bounds. The victim was kidnapped and beaten to death after leaving her weekly church choir practice, and her body was found just off a Chickasaw County road near Houston, Mississippi. Berry admitted to the killing, and the confession was used against him at trial. He had admitted that he intended to commit rape but had changed his mind. He also changed his mind after telling her she would be freed and drove her to a second wooded location and used his fists to beat her to death. The victim died as a result of repeated blows to the head.

Berry used his grandmother's car and later drove to her house, disposed of a pair of mismatched tennis shoes along the way, burned his bloodied clothes, and wiped the vehicle he had used of any blood stains with a towel, which he threw into a nearby pond. Berry's brother, who was at the house, witnessed some of this suspicious behavior. On December 5, 1987, he called investigators and told them what he had observed. The next day, Berry was arrested at his grandmother's home and soon confessed to the crime.

Police found the tennis shoes that Berry had discarded and also recovered the bloodied towel from the pond. Berry was indicted for the murder and kidnapping of Mary Bounds, and as a habitual criminal on March 1, 1988.

Berry had stated in 2007 that he has no remorse for the crime.

He was subsequently scheduled to die by lethal injection on October 30, 2007, at the Mississippi State Penitentiary in Parchman.

== Stay of execution ==
Though the U.S. Court of Appeals for the Fifth Circuit denied Berry's request to stop his execution (citing exceeded time limits to challenge the constitutionality of lethal injection), the U.S. Supreme Court ordered a stay of execution minutes prior to Berry's scheduled execution at the Mississippi State Penitentiary in Parchman. This effectively delayed but did not commute Berry's sentence. The order to delay execution was due to a pending Kentucky case before the court regarding the constitutionality of lethal injection.

Dissenting justices Samuel A. Alito Jr. and Antonin Scalia noted that they would have denied the application to put off the execution which was scheduled for 6 pm. The Court's delay order came about 15 minutes before Berry was to be put to death by lethal injection.

== Execution ==
The U.S. Supreme Court denied both Berry's appeals of his execution on May 21, 2008. Just hours before his execution, Mississippi Department of Corrections Commissioner Chris Epps described Berry as somber and serious, realizing his death was imminent and giving up hope that the U.S. Supreme Court was going to grant either of his last-minute appeals.

"I used to be his case manager. So, I've been knowing him for a while," Epps said. "He's pretty serious now. He's not grinning like he was in October." Epps said he stood in front Berry's cell this afternoon and said, "Inmate Berry do you have any remorse for what you did to Mrs. Bounds?" "He said he had no remorse and felt that after 21 years he had paid for it," Epps continued. "He understood the question and that was the answer he gave."

Berry finished his last meal of Barbecue pork chops, barbecue pork sausages, buttered toast, salad (heavy on the onion), mashed potatoes and gravy, pecan pie, and any juice about 4:35 p.m. and was given a sedative. He elected not to take his last shower and did not make any phone calls. His mother, brother, sister-in-law and two friends visited him on the day of his execution. His last words were, "No comment. It's in God's hands now."

Berry was pronounced dead at 6:15 p.m. on May 21, 2008.

== See also ==
- Capital punishment in Mississippi
- Capital punishment in the United States
- List of people executed in Mississippi
- List of people executed in the United States in 2008

Preceded by William Earl Lynd	People executed in US after Baze v. Rees ruling	Succeeded by Kevin Green (murderer)
