= Curtis Osborne =

American murderer (1970–2008)

- Born: March 1970; Spalding County, Georgia, U.S.
- Died: June 4, 2008 (aged 38); Georgia Diagnostic and Classification State Prison, Georgia, U.S.
- Status: Executed by lethal injection
- Conviction: Malice murder (two counts)
- Penalty: Death (August 15, 1991)

Details
- Victims: Arthur Lee Jones; Linda Lisa Seaborne
- Date: August 7, 1990

Curtis Osborne (March 1970 – June 4, 2008) was an American convicted murderer on death row in Georgia from Spalding County. He murdered Arthur Lee Jones and Linda Lisa Seaborne in 1990 to avoid paying a $400 debt. Johnny Mostiler, his court-appointed attorney, allegedly neglected to inform Osborne that the prosecutor had offered him a life sentence in exchange for a plea bargain, declaring "That little nigger deserves the death penalty." Osborne's case for clemency was championed by former U.S. President Jimmy Carter and former Deputy U.S. Attorney General Larry Thompson, who wrote letters to the clemency board pleading for mercy. Former U.S. Attorney General Griffin Bell also spoke on his behalf. His execution was carried out despite these appeals.

== Murders ==
On August 7, 1990, the bodies of Arthur Lee Jones and Linda Lisa Seaborne were found in an abandoned car on a dirt road in Spalding County, Georgia. Both victims had been shot in the head, with Jones sustaining a gunshot wound just below his left eye and Seaborne sustaining a gunshot wound to her neck. Three weeks before the murders, Jones had asked Osborne, his sister's boyfriend, to help him sell a motorcycle. Osborne had sold the motorcycle for US$400 and kept the money. Osborne was interviewed by authorities and eventually admitted to the crime. He claimed, however, that Jones had reached towards the floor for a weapon, and he had acted in self-defense. However, evidence from the crime scene showed Jones had been sitting upright when Osborne shot him and that the gun was only an inch away from his skull. Osborne's mother later testified that her husband's .357 Ruger was missing, a gun which was already suspected as the murder weapon. The gun was never recovered.

== Trial ==
In October 1990, Osborne was indicted on two counts of malice murder and two counts of felony murder. Prosecutors alleged Osborne murdered Jones after he was confronted about the money from the motorcycle sale. Jones had demanded Osborne give him the US$400, and Osborne had killed him in retaliation, as well as Seaborne because she was a witness. On August 14, 1991, a jury found Osborne guilty, and he was sentenced to death the following day.

== Execution ==
On June 4, 2008, Osborne was executed via lethal injection. He refused any special last meal and made no final statement. He had initially been scheduled for execution at around 7:00 p.m., however, the execution was delayed when the executioners took over thirty-five minutes to find a suitable vein they could use to administer the lethal drugs.

== See also ==
- Capital punishment in Georgia (U.S. state)
- Capital punishment in the United States
- List of people executed in Georgia (U.S. state)
- List of people executed in the United States in 2008

Preceded by Kevin Green	People executed in US after Baze v. Rees ruling	Succeeded by David Mark Hill
