= Nenno =

Nenno may refer to:

Places

- Nenno, Wisconsin, an unincorporated community located in the town of Addison, Washington County, Wisconsin
- Nenno, a village in Valbrevenna comune in Italy

Surnames

- Eric Nenno (1961–2008), a convicted and executed child killer
