= James Earl Reed =

American murderer (1958–2008)

- Born: November 26, 1958; South Carolina, U.S.
- Died: June 20, 2008 (aged 49); Broad River Correctional Institution, South Carolina, U.S.
- Status: Executed by electrocution
- Motive: Girlfriend ended their relationship
- Conviction: Murder (2 counts)
- Penalty: Death

Details
- Victims: 2
- Date: May 15, 1994
- Country: United States
- State: South Carolina
- Location: Adams Run

James Earl Reed (November 26, 1958 – June 20, 2008) was an American convicted murderer put to death in the state of South Carolina by electrocution in "Old Sparky", the state's electric chair. He remains the most recent person executed in South Carolina via electrocution.

== Killings ==
Reed and 28-year-old Laurie Rego dated briefly while they were both in the United States Army. Sometime after Rego tried to end the relationship, Reed pleaded guilty to assault for ramming his car into a man who was trying to help Rego and was sentenced to 37 months in prison. While incarcerated, he wrote numerous threatening letters to Rego.

In May 1994, Reed was released from prison. Shortly afterwards he bought a gun and hitchhiked to the home of Rego's parents, Joseph and Barbara Ann Lafayette, who lived in Adams Run, South Carolina, looking for her. Reed shot the couple five times before fleeing the scene. Although no physical evidence linked Reed to the murder scene, he was arrested and questioned by police. He then cooperated with police in an attempt to locate the murder weapon and spent casings, however they were never recovered.

== Conviction ==
Reed, who was said to have an IQ of 77 and have a "neurological impairment", represented himself and waived his right to testify during the final part of his trial at Charleston County Circuit Court. Prior to the jury being sent out to consider its verdict, Reed sought to alter his relationship with his standby counsel. He wanted to give a closing statement before his attorney would continue. Reed claimed it was because he was too emotional to cross-examine the victims' family. Over the objections of Reed's standby counsel, District Court Judge William L. Howard refused to reappoint counsel because Reed had already waived his right to counsel at the opening of the trial, making it far too late into the proceeding for his attorney to adequately prepare.

The jury took only 30 minutes to find Reed guilty of murder recommending that he should be sentenced to death. Judge Howard concurred, sentencing Reed to death for the double killings. In 2003, Reed ended his right to appeal in at least four different courts. He chose to die by electrocution instead of lethal injection, did not ask for clemency, eat a last meal, or make a final statement.

== Execution ==
Reed's execution was set for 6pm on June 20, 2008, but a series of appeals stopped the execution from occurring until 11:20 p.m., when the curtains were opened so that witnesses could view the execution. Reed was strapped into the chair, with a strap or mask that covered most of his head. Electrodes were connected to his head through a wire that could be seen connecting from the ceiling to a cap on his head and another wire was connected to the calf of his right leg. Reed was not seen to look at anyone and he declined to state any last words. He had earlier also declined to opt for a last meal or any spiritual advisor. After his declination to last words was announced, a leather hood was tied around his head.

When the switch was thrown, The Post and Courier reporter Jill Coley, who was a witness of the execution, heard a noise similar to the sound made by the key ring clip lock on a gas station pump handle when the tank is "full". The sound indicated that the circuit of the electric chair had been completed and current was now passing into Reed's body. Reed jerked forward, but other than that there was no significant movement. The electrodes were disconnected at 11:25 p.m. and he was pronounced dead at 11:27 p.m. A prison official then stated, "The sentence of South Carolina v. James Reed was carried out at 11:27 p.m."

Witnesses to the execution included Marsha Lafayette Aleem, the youngest daughter of the couple Reed was convicted of murdering. She was seated in the first of three rows and directly in front of Reed as he sat in the electric chair. She was accompanied by two of her uncles. In the row behind them were a victims' advocate and an investigator. Seated in the third and final row were the three media witnesses invited to the execution. No one from Reed's family chose to attend his execution.

== See also ==
- List of people executed in South Carolina
- List of people executed in the United States in 2008

Executions carried out in South Carolina
Preceded by David Mark Hill June 6, 2008	James Earl Reed; June 20, 2008	Succeeded by Joseph Gardner December 5, 2008
Executions carried out in the United States
Preceded by Terry Short – Oklahoma June 17, 2008	James Earl Reed – South Carolina; June 20, 2008	Succeeded by Robert Yarbrough – Oklahoma June 25, 2008
