= Lesley Moreland =

English author whose daughter was murdered in 1990

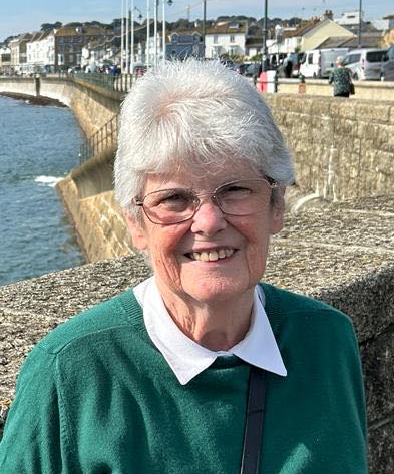
- Occupation: Author
- Children: Ruth Moreland
- Writing career
- Notable work: An Ordinary Murder

Lesley Moreland is an English author whose book published in 2001 detailed her experience following the murder of her daughter Ruth in 1990. Moreland is notable for her resolve to meet the man who killed her daughter and for her correspondence with an American man on Death row in Texas.

== Biography ==
Moreland's daughter Ruth was murdered in 1990 when she was 23 years of age. Moreland's book, An Ordinary Murder, tells the painful story of what happened to her and her family in the period following Ruth's murder. She reveals her struggle to find ways of continuing to live positively while accepting Ruth's death. An Ordinary Murder also provides an insight into the bureaucracies of the criminal justice system and Moreland's struggle to uncover the facts surrounding her daughter's death and her battle to meet with the man who murdered her daughter.

The book details Moreland's resolve and ultimate prison meeting with her daughter's killer, Andrew Steel (not his real name) in 1995. Steel was a friend of Ruth's former boyfriend. He had a history of violence towards women, and had taken LSD before he stabbed Ruth to death, inflicting over 100 wounds. By meeting the man who murdered her daughter, Moreland sought to discover more about his life and background, hoping that she could find peace by having him answer questions about the circumstances surrounding the final moments of her daughter's life.

For 17 years, Moreland also regularly corresponded with Michael Richard, a Death row inmate in Texas, who was convicted of an unrelated murder. Moreland is a Quaker, and her exchange with Richard, was influenced by her personal faith and conviction that there is humanity in everyone, even the most condemned criminal. This correspondence was part of a wider letter-writing network established by LifeLines in the UK, that connected Britons with death row inmates, as part of a program that was opposed to capital punishment in the United States. Moreland stated in an interview that "Michael and I have slowly established a relationship that is deep and honest...I hope I would have been interested in writing to someone in his situation anyway, but after Ruth's death what I was trying to cling onto was the fact {that} human beings are very complex, and even if someone has taken a life, it's not the whole of them. There is that of God within all of us."

A reviewer of An Ordinary Murder stated that "The need to explore the potential value of restorative justice to the long-term health of the victims left behind could scarcely have been better illustrated."

In another book, Death, Dying and Bereavement, which includes a chapter by Moreland, the editors note that Lesley's "thoughts and experience following the murder of her daughter provide insight into a particularly traumatic form of sudden death."

At the time of Ruth's death Moreland lived in Hertfordshire with her husband Vic. They had one elder daughter called Catherine. Prior to writing An Ordinary Murder Moreland had a role as the Director of the Stillbirth and Neonatal Death Society (SANDS) as well as working in the voluntary sector for over 30 years.

== Bibliography ==
- Moreland, Lesley (2001). An Ordinary Murder. Aurum. ISBN 978-1-85410-745-9.
- 'Ruth: Death by Murder', In: Dickenson, Donna (editor); Johnson, Malcolm (editor), Katz, Jeanne (editor) 2000, Death, Dying and Bereavement (2nd ed.) Sage Publications in association with the Open University. ISBN 978-0-7619-6857-3
