= David Mark Hill =

American spree killer (1960–2008)

- Born: May 24, 1960; South Carolina, U.S.
- Died: June 6, 2008 (aged 48); Broad River Correctional Institution, South Carolina, U.S.
- Spouse: Jacqueline Hill (m. 1991)
- Children: 3
- Status: Executed by lethal injection
- Motive: Revenge over impending divorce
- Conviction: Murder (3 counts)
- Penalty: Death

Details
- Victims: 3
- Date: September 16, 1996
- Country: United States
- State: South Carolina
- Location: North Augusta

David Mark Hill (May 24, 1960 – June 6, 2008) was an American murderer who killed three people in South Carolina.

== Life ==
Hill married Jacqueline Hill in 1991. They had three children, one of whom required the use of a wheelchair after an accident. After that incident, Hill experienced depression, panic attacks and seizures.

In 1996, Hill received notice that his wife was filing for divorce, and he was accused of sexually abusing his daughter, who was quadriplegic. On September 16 of that year, Hill went to a North Augusta social services office and killed Michael Gregory, Josie Curry and Jimmy Riddle, who all worked at the office. According to court documents, Hill killed Riddle because he was involved in the case that removed his children from his home, killed Gregory because he had seen him with the gun, and killed Curry "because she was black."

At trial in 2000, Hill's wife testified that he had tried to kill himself at least three times.

Hill was executed via lethal injection on June 6, 2008, in South Carolina. He was pronounced dead at 6:17 pm.

== See also ==
- Capital punishment in South Carolina
- Capital punishment in the United States
- List of people executed in South Carolina
- List of people executed in the United States in 2008
- List of white defendants executed for killing a black victim

Executions carried out in South Carolina
Preceded by Calvin Shuler June 22, 2007	David Mark Hill; June 6, 2008	Succeeded by James Earl Reed June 20, 2008
Executions carried out in the United States
Preceded by Curtis Osborne – Georgia June 4, 2008	David Mark Hill – South Carolina; June 6, 2008	Succeeded by Karl Chamberlain – Texas June 11, 2008
