= Tony Ray Amati =

American man convicted of murder

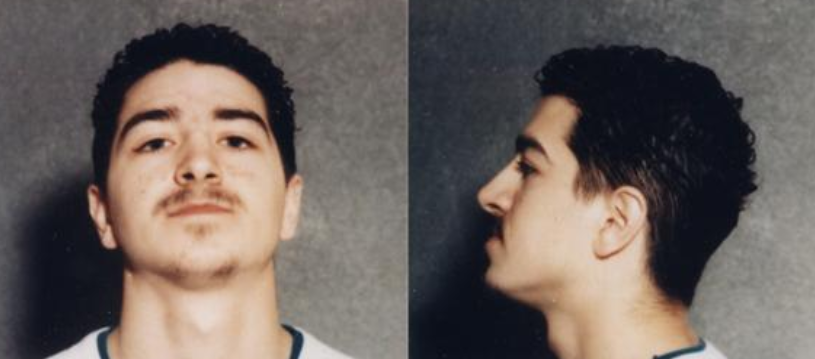

FBI Ten Most Wanted Fugitive
- Alias: Anthony Ray Jones; Phillip D. Gitlitz; Debon Restivito; Shane Wade

Description
- Born: Anthony Ray Amati; June 28, 1976 (age 50); Carbondale, Illinois, U.S.

Status
- Convictions: First degree murder with a deadly weapon Attempted murder with a deadly weapon
- Penalty: 40 years to life in prison
- Added: February 27, 1998
- Caught: March 1, 1998
- Number: 452
- Captured

Anthony "Tony" Ray Amati (born June 28, 1976), known as The Thrill Killer, is an American man connected to the deaths of three men from May to August 1996. The FBI was brought in to find Amati's whereabouts and added him to the FBI Ten Most Wanted Fugitives list on February 27, 1998. He was arrested two days later, tried, found guilty of the murder of Keith Dyer, and sentenced to life imprisonment with a minimum of 40 years served in 1999.

== Early life ==
Amati was born in Carbondale, Illinois. He and his family moved to Las Vegas in 1992. He graduated from Clark High School with honors in 1994. Amati was still in high school when he got a job as a telemarketer. During his murder trial, a doctor said he was highly intelligent, able to discern right from wrong, and exhibited many of the traits of obsessive–compulsive disorder. "He has the personality characteristics that you would see in a good accountant", the doctor testified.

== Robbery and murders ==
On May 26, 1996, Amati and two accomplices, 27-year-old Troy Sampson and 23-year-old Edward James, robbed Master Shooter's Supply, a gun store in southern Las Vegas, of $30,000 worth of guns and ammunition.

The next day, 27-year-old Michael Matta, a drywall worker, was shot more than twenty times while he was looking through a dumpster in a Las Vegas housing complex. Two months later, on July 28, 48-year-old John Garcia was shot to death one block away from where Matta was killed, with witnesses telling police that two men were seen running from the scene. Amati claimed that he was not present at the two murders, though the guns used were later found in his home.

Four weeks later, in August, the three men confronted 22-year-old Keith Dyer, who was shot thirteen times as he was walking with a coworker to an apartment complex near University of Nevada, Las Vegas. Stacie Dooley, Dyer's coworker, was shot in the leg. Police alleged that Amati, Sampson, and James had been testing the new weapons they had stolen, dubbing them "thrill killers".

== Investigation ==
At the scene, Amati cut his hand, leaving blood that police eventually collected and used to implicate him. In October 1996, Amati, Sampson and James sold stolen guns to a dealer. Unknown to them, the buyer was an undercover policeman, and both Sampson and James were apprehended, while Amati remained at large. Their trailer was subsequently seized and searched by investigators, who uncovered the stolen weapons, which were eventually matched to the guns used to kill all three victims. Since Amati couldn't be located, his two accomplices remained in police custody until he was found.

On February 27, 1998, Amati was officially added as number 452 on the FBI's ten most wanted list, and they subsequently took control over the case. It was found that in the two years Amati was a fugitive, he went under multiple pseudonyms including Anthony Ray Jones, Phillip D. Gitlitz, Debon Restivito and Shane William Wade. The FBI found that he was arrested multiple times in Utah, but managed to convince police that he was a different person each time.

While Amati was at large, he was featured in an episode of the popular television program America's Most Wanted, in which investigators involved in the extensive manhunt for Amati said that he was most likely armed and dangerous. They suspected Amati might be in Southern Illinois, because of family that was known to have lived there. Initially, after over fifty tips from that area, that theory ran dry.

Days after the episode was broadcast, detectives received a tip from Georgia, and FBI agents were dispatched there to find him. On March 1, agents stormed Amati's hotel room in Atlanta and arrested him without incident.

Amati's father, Charlie Amati, pleaded guilty to a misdemeanor charge of obstructing a peace officer for giving an officer a fraudulent license with a photo of Tony. He was sentenced to 12 months of conditional discharge and fined $200.

== Trial and imprisonment ==
In December 1996, Sampson pleaded guilty to possession of stolen property and being a convicted felon in possession of a firearm. He was sentenced to 20 to 50 months in prison.

Amati, Sampson and James were all charged with the murders, but due to evidence withheld by the judge, the charges against Sampson and James were dropped by the district attorney. The murder charges against Amati remained. In 1999, he stood trial, denying his guilt, claiming the murders were primarily committed by Sampson and James, and that he himself never pulled the trigger.

During the trial, Amati claimed he only participated in the string of killings out of fear of Sampson, and only went on the run since he thought no one would believe him even if he turned himself in. Amati was acquitted of killing Matta and Garcia, but found guilty of killing Dyer. During his sentencing hearing, he said "I'm so sorry this had to happen" and begged the jury for mercy. Amati's lawyers had argued that his age warranted leniency, and said it would be unfair for him to be executed when his codefendants were walking free. The jury ultimately spared his life and recommended life in prison with the possibility of parole. Although the sentence was the absolute best case scenario for Amati, Bruce Dyer said he was satisfied. "To me, it would be a living hell to be in jail for 40 years," he said.

Jurors said that while they believed Amati shot Dyer, they decided to spare his life due to the lack of other violent incidents in his life before and after the murders.

Amati is serving his sentence at Lovelock Correctional Center, and will become eligible for parole in 2038, when he is 62.

Sampson was released from prison in August 1999. On November 14, 2000, he robbed and burned down a Las Vegas convenience store. He cut the telephone lines to the store in an attempt to disable the alarm system, cut a hole in the roof to get inside, and cut the power lines to the store security cameras. However, Sampson missed one camera, which filmed him breaking into video poker machines, trying to drill open an ATM, and pouring lighter fluid around the store and lighting it on fire.

Sampson faced a federal arson charge since the store was involved in interstate commerce. In 2002, he pleaded guilty to arson and was sentenced to 150 months in prison. Sampson was released from prison on December 11, 2012.

== See also ==
- List of homicides in Nevada
- FBI Ten Most Wanted Fugitives, 1990s
