= Leon Dorsey =

American serial killer

- Inmate ID photo
- Born: Leon David Dorsey IV; November 17, 1975; Dallas, Texas, U.S.
- Died: August 12, 2008 (aged 32); Huntsville Unit, Texas, U.S.
- Other names: "Pistol Pete" "The Blockbuster Killer"
- Status: Executed by lethal injection
- Convictions: Capital murder Murder
- Penalty: 60 years (Chon murder); Death (Lindsey and Armstrong murders)

Details
- Victims: 3
- Span of crimes: April 4 – September 11, 1994
- Country: United States
- State: Texas
- Date apprehended: September 14, 1994

Leon David Dorsey IV (November 17, 1975 – August 12, 2008), also known as Pistol Pete, was an American serial killer who shot and killed two Blockbuster store employees and a Korean store clerk in Texas over several months in 1994. He confessed and was later given a death sentence. He was executed at the Huntsville Unit on August 12, 2008.

== Murders ==
On the night of April 4, 1994, Dorsey entered a Blockbuster store in Dallas, where 20-year-old Brad Lindsey and 26-year-old James Armstrong were working. Dorsey forced the two into the back room, where he tried to force them to open the safe. However, the safe was on a time-lock and could not be opened by Lindsey or Armstrong. When Armstrong tried to flee, Dorsey shot him, and then shot Lindsey, presumably to prevent a possible eyewitness. He then took over $400 from the register, leaving Armstrong and Lindsey to die. The perpetrator was caught on a surveillance camera entering the store, but police would not know who the killer was until much later.

While Dorsey was questioned by police in the weeks after, he maintained his innocence and police saw no reason to arrest him. Police later found out that Dorsey owned a 9 millimeter pistol, which was the same weapon used in the murders, but by that time they had already come to the conclusion that he was not involved.

On September 11, 1994, 51-year-old Hyon Suk Chon, a Korean convenience store worker working in Ellis county, was approached by Dorsey. He pulled out his gun and forced her into the back room, where instead of forcing her to open a safe, he shot her once in the back of the head, killing her.

This time, however, police tested his gun and the gun used to kill Suk Chon, and they were a match. Dorsey was arrested and confessed to the murder of Suk Chon, but maintained his innocence in the murders of Armstrong and Lindsey. In 1995, he pleaded guilty to the murder of Suk Chon, and was sentenced to 60 years in prison.

== Exposure ==
In 1998, investigators reopened the case of the murders of Armstrong and Lindsey. They again questioned Dorsey at the prison, but he again said he had nothing to do with it. This time, however, investigators properly examined the footage that captured the killer entering and leaving the store. The footage was sent to the Federal Bureau of Investigation (FBI) to see if they could conclude any new evidence that was previously overlooked. They estimated the killer's height was approximately the same as Dorsey's height. This time when the FBI went to talk to him, Dorsey finally confessed to the murders of Armstrong and Lindsey.

Before his capital murder trial, Dorsey gave an interview with The Dallas Morning News, in which he said "I've done cut folks; I've done stabbed folks; I've killed folks," he said, "but it don't bother me." Regarding the murders, he said "They're dead. That's over and done with. Why are you going to sit there and worry yourself about that? Move on. I could have came in here and been, 'Oh, I'm sorry, I'm so bad.' But I don't feel like that. That's not being honest with myself." The prosecution used the interview in their arguments for why Dorsey should be sentenced to death.

Dorsey stood trial in April 2000, 6 years after killing Armstrong and Lindsey. During the trial, the mother of Armstrong made a statement to Dorsey; "Our son was a gentle man, you were not. I believe you're an evil, vile creature. You didn't kill for survival, you killed for pleasure." In June 2000, Dorsey was convicted of capital murder and sentenced to death.

== Execution ==
While awaiting execution, Dorsey was considered by officials as a Level-Three inmate, meaning he was always causing trouble and havoc. Considering the crimes he committed, fellow inmates called him “Pistol Pete”.

On August 12, 2008, Dorsey was led out of his cell to the death chamber, where he was strapped to the gurney and the officials readied the lethal injection. The parents of Armstrong and Lindsey were present in the spectator room. Before death, Dorsey turned his head to the spectator room and said; "I love all y'all. I forgive all y'all. See y'all when you get there."

== See also ==
- Capital punishment in Texas
- Capital punishment in the United States
- List of people executed in Texas, 2000–2009
- List of people executed in the United States in 2008
- List of serial killers in the United States
