= Thang Thanh Nguyen =

Vietnamese former fugitive

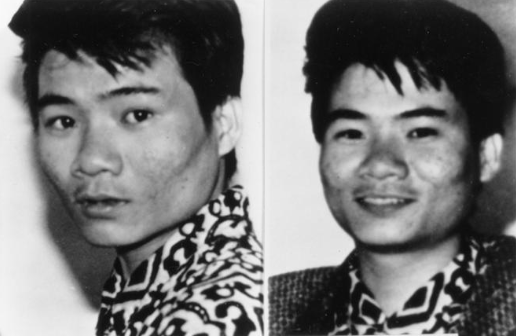
- FBI handout photos of Nguyen

FBI Ten Most Wanted Fugitive

Description
- Born: March 20, 1969 (age 57); Sóc Trăng, Vietnam
- Nationality: Vietnamese
- Height: 5 ft 6 in (168 cm)

Status
- Convictions: Second degree murder First degree burglary
- Penalty: 37 1/2 years to life in prison (reduced to 25 years)
- Added: August 3, 1996
- Caught: December 22, 1997
- Number: 446
- Captured

Thang Thanh Nguyen (born March 20, 1969) is a Vietnamese convicted murderer who spent sixteen months on the FBI Ten Most Wanted Fugitives List for the 1992 robbery and murder of businessman Chung Lam in Irondequoit, New York. He was added to the list on August 3, 1996, and was arrested in Vietnam on December 22, 1997. He was convicted the following year and sentenced to life imprisonment, but in 2003 his sentence was reduced to 25 years to life on appeal.

== Early life ==
Nguyen is a native of Sóc Trăng, Vietnam, having been born there on March 20, 1969. He first entered the United States in 1984 and became a citizen. He worked as a restaurant cook and was an active gambler.

== Murder ==
One establishment he worked at was the Saigon Vietnamese and Chinese restaurant, owned by 39-year-old Vietnamese immigrant Chung Lam in Irondequoit, New York. Lam had fled to the U.S. to seek refuge after the Vietnam War. Nguyen worked there until he was fired. He then moved to Fort Worth, Texas, where he befriended Thoan Van Luc and brothers Vu Ngo and Sang Ngo of Wichita, Kansas.

On January 26, 1992, the four broke into Lam's Irondequoit home at 72 Veronica Drive. Lam shared the home with his wife, four daughters, and two brothers. The men stormed to the second floor, where Lam was standing on the patio, and Nguyen proceeded to shoot him in the head. One of the other men shot one of Lam's brothers.

The four then ransacked the whole house stealing money and jewelry. During the gunfire, Sang Ngo was shot accidentally. All four fled the home while Sang went to the hospital. Police were called and Lam was rushed to the Rochester General Hospital, but he died at 4:52 a.m. from his wound.

== Investigation ==
Sang, suffering from a bullet wound he could not explain, was immediately implicated in the crime and arrested. He confessed, with Vu and Thoan being arrested not long after. In early 1992, having still not been arrested by police, Nguyen fled to his home country Vietnam. Later in 1993, Vu Ngo was put on trial for second degree murder. After deliberating for two days, the jury acquitted him. All three were convicted of burglary and given lengthy prison terms.

Nguyen was indicted on a murder charge by a Monroe County grand jury. Investigators had accused Nguyen of being the ringleader of the murder. On August 3, 1996, the Federal Bureau of Investigation (FBI) charged Nguyen with unlawful flight to avoid prosecution and added him to their Ten Most Wanted Fugitives List as number 446. He was also featured on the tv show America's Most Wanted.

== Arrest and trial ==
On December 22, 1997, Nguyen was arrested by military police in Bac Lieu, Vietnam, while at his family's home. He was extradited to the U.S. in January 1998. He was charged with second-degree murder, attempted second-degree murder, first-degree burglary and first-degree robbery. Nguyen and his lawyers argued to a judge that he had been "illegally apprehended" and "forced to confess". His trial opened in mid-July. In opening statements prosecutors argued that Nguyen was the mastermind behind the murder and that the evidence overwhelmingly supports it. In August 1998 he was convicted and sentenced to 25 years to life in prison for the murder charge and 12 1/2 to 25 years for the robbery charge. In total he would have to serve at least 37 1/2 years to be eligible for parole, which would be in 2035. In October 2003, an appellate court of the New York Supreme Court reduced Nguyen's sentence from 37 1/2 years to life to 25 years to life, making him eligible for parole in 2023. If paroled, he would have been deported to Vietnam as an illegal immigrant and be prohibited from reentering the United States. His parole, however, was denied, and his next parole eligibility date is July 2, 2035. As of 2024, he is incarcerated at Green Haven Correctional Facility as DIN 98B1975.

== See also ==
- FBI Ten Most Wanted Fugitives, 1990s
