= Glen Stewart Godwin =

American fugitive and murderer

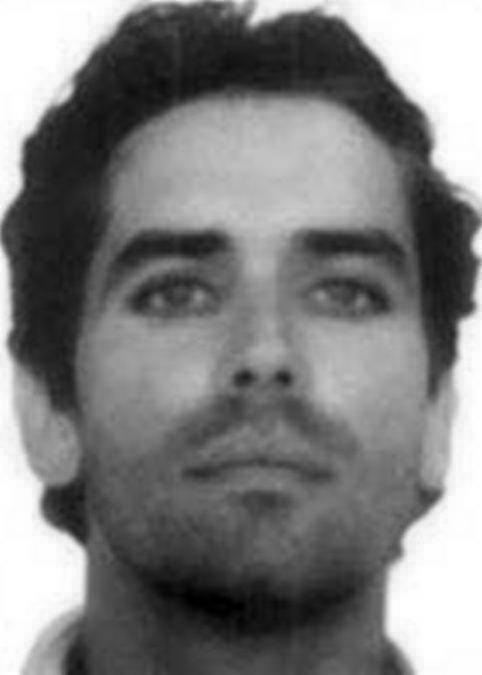
- Photograph taken in 1991

FBI Ten Most Wanted Fugitive
- Charges: Murder; Prison escape; Unlawful Flight to Avoid Confinement
- Reward: $20,000
- Alias: Michael Carrera; Miguel Carrera; Michael Carmen; Glen Godwin; Glen S. Godwin; Dennis H. McWilliams; Dennis Harold McWilliams

Description
- Born: June 26, 1958 (age 68); Miami, Florida
- Nationality: American
- Race: White
- Gender: Male
- Height: 6 ft 0 in (1.83 m)
- Weight: 178 lb (81 kg)
- Occupation: Self-employed in tool supplies, Mechanic, Construction worker

Status
- Convictions: Murder (1983) robbery (1983) attempted escape (1987) drug trafficking (1991)
- Penalty: 26 years to life (1983); 7 years in prison (1991)
- Added: December 7, 1996
- Removed: May 19, 2016
- Number: 447
- Removed from Top Ten Fugitive List

Glen Stewart Godwin (born June 26, 1958) is an American fugitive and convicted murderer who was added to the Federal Bureau of Investigation's Ten Most Wanted Fugitives list on December 7, 1996, nine years after he escaped from Folsom State Prison in Folsom, California, where he was serving a 26-years-to-life sentence. He replaced O'Neil Vassell on the list, and was the first colored photo used on the list. However, he was dropped from the list on May 19, 2016.

== Early years ==
Glen Godwin was born June 26, 1958, in Miami, Florida. In the 1960s, his family moved to California and resided in Palm Springs, Riverside County, California. Godwin attended Palm Springs High School, which he graduated in 1975. Godwin did well at school and played trumpet for many years in the school brass band.

== Murder of Kim LeValley ==
In 1980, Godwin was living in Palm Springs, California, working as a self-employed tool salesman, a mechanic, and a construction worker, with no discernible criminal history. Godwin and his roommate, Frank Soto, Jr., planned to rob a drug dealer and pilot, Kim Robert LeValley, who was once a friend of theirs. Godwin and Soto lured LeValley back to their condominium where Soto held him, Godwin punched and kicked him, tried to strangle him, then ultimately stabbed LeValley 26 times with a knife. After the murder, Godwin and Soto loaded the body into a truck and set off for the desert. Godwin tried to blow up the evidence by using homemade explosives strapped to the body. The explosion was intended to disguise the murder of LeValley. On August 3, 1980, some Eagle Mountain residents found a blown-up pickup truck with remains of a human body inside of it abandoned in the desert.

Later, police identified the body and charged Godwin with first-degree murder. Although Soto testified against Godwin, Soto was sentenced to 25 years to life in prison for the murder in 1982. Godwin was sentenced for the murder and robbery to 26 years to life in prison in 1983.

== Escape from Folsom State Prison ==
In 1987, Godwin attempted to escape during his incarceration at Deuel Vocational Institute in California, and he was moved to Folsom State Prison, a maximum-security prison. Authorities believe Godwin's wife Shelly Rose Godwin and his former cellmate in Deuel, Lorenz Karlic, helped to plan his escape.

A hacksaw and other tools had been smuggled into the prison for Godwin. On June 5, 1987, he cut a hole through fence wire and escaped into a storm drain that emptied into the American River. Godwin dropped through a manhole and crawled 750 feet (230 m) through the pitch-black drain. An accomplice, suspected to be either Godwin's wife or Karlic, had left a raft that Godwin used to float down the river, following painted arrows on rocks that directed him where to go.

In June 1987, Karlic was arrested in Hesperia, California and convicted for aiding Godwin's escape. Karlic died by suicide on February 12, 2002, while in custody at Men's Central Jail in Los Angeles, California. He had previously been arrested after a foot chase with deputies from the Los Angeles County Sheriff's Department. He had been convicted in January 2002 of eight charges related to the pursuit which took place in La Crescenta in April 2001. Karlic was scheduled to be sentenced on February 25, 2002.

In January 1988, Shelly Godwin was classified as a federal fugitive for her role in her husband's escape. She was captured by the FBI in Dallas, Texas, on February 7, 1990.

== Capture and escape ==
Godwin fled to Mexico, where he unsuccessfully participated in the illegal drug trade. He was arrested in Puerto Vallarta, later convicted for drug trafficking in Guadalajara, Mexico, and sentenced to seven years and six months to Puente Grande prison in 1991. While American authorities were working on Godwin's extradition proceedings, he allegedly killed a member of a Mexican drug cartel in prison. The new murder allegation delayed his extradition, which gave Godwin more time to execute another escape, which occurred in September 1991.

Godwin is currently believed to be involved in the illicit drug trade somewhere in Latin America, having possibly used aliases such as Dennis Harold McWilliams, Nigel Lopez and Miguel Carrera. He is considered to be armed and extremely dangerous, and an obvious flight risk. The FBI is offering a reward of up to $20,000 for information leading to Godwin's capture.

He was removed from the Most Wanted List in May 2016 with the FBI director declaring that "We think the payoff from the publicity has diminished over time".

On March 15, 2021, Godwin was featured on the first episode of the revival of America's Most Wanted.

== See also ==
- List of fugitives from justice who disappeared
