= Agustín Vásquez Mendoza =

Mexican murderer

FBI Ten Most Wanted Fugitive
- Charges: Murder of undercover DEA agent

Description
- Born: March 23, 1974, October 1, 1972, or October 1, 1969; Michoacán, Mexico
- Nationality: Mexican

Status
- Convictions: First degree murder
- Penalty: Life imprisonment
- Added: August 3, 1996
- Caught: July 9, 2000
- Number: 445
- Captured

Agustín Vásquez Mendoza is a Mexican citizen who was sought for four years in the late 1990s by the United States Federal Bureau of Investigation (FBI) as the 445th FBI Ten Most Wanted Fugitive for his alleged participation in a drug conspiracy which led to the death of a U.S. Drug Enforcement Administration (DEA) Special Agent. DEA agents believe that Agustin Vasquez Mendoza was helped to go on the run by one family member with a sur-name Prado Vazquez, from Aguililla, Michoacán. When the detectives questioned the alleged family, they refused to release a statement regarding Agustin Vazquez Mendoza's whereabouts.

== Biography ==
Vasquez-Mendoza murdered DEA Special Agent Richard E. Fass while Special Agent Fass was making an undercover buy of methamphetamine from Vásquez at a garage in Glendale, Arizona. Vasquez-Mendoza was arrested in Puebla by Mexican authorities in the summer of 2000. In 2006, Mendoza was convicted of first degree murder in Arizona and sentenced to life in prison.
