= Joseph Gardner (murderer) =

American former fugitive executed in South Carolina (1970–2008)

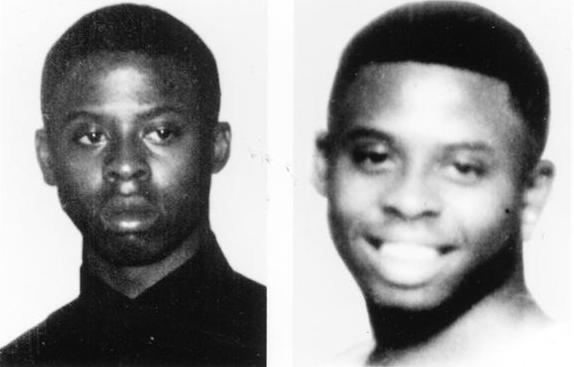
- FBI profile images of Joseph Gardner

FBI Ten Most Wanted Fugitive
- Charges: Murder; Unlawful Flight to Avoid Prosecution
- Alias: Joseph M. L. Gardner; Joe Gardner

Description
- Born: Joseph Martin Luther Gardner; January 15, 1970; Detroit, Michigan, U.S.
- Died: December 5, 2008 (aged 38); Broad River Correctional Institution, Columbia, South Carolina, U.S.
- Cause of death: Execution by lethal injection
- Gender: Male
- Height: 5 ft 8 in (1.73 m)
- Occupation: Criminal; FBI Ten Most Wanted fugitive

Status
- Convictions: Murder; Kidnapping
- Penalty: Death
- Added: May 25, 1994
- Executed: December 5, 2008 (aged 38)
- Number: 437
- Executed

Joseph Martin Luther Gardner (January 15, 1970 – December 5, 2008) was an American fugitive and convicted criminal who was executed in South Carolina for murder. Gardner was one of several men who kidnapped and raped 25-year-old Melissa McLauchlin on December 30, 1992. McLauchlin was then shot five times by Gardner before her body was dumped on the side of a road. After the murder, Gardner fled the state and remained a fugitive for nearly two years. He was added to the FBI Ten Most Wanted Fugitives list on May 25, 1994, and captured in Philadelphia, Pennsylvania, on October 19, 1994.

== Murder ==
On December 30, 1992, an intoxicated 25-year-old Melissa McLauchlin locked herself out of her house in North Charleston, South Carolina. As she crossed the street towards a grocery store, she was picked up by Gardner and two other men; Matthew Carl Mack and Matthew Paul Williams. The three men kidnapped McLauchlin and took her back to a mobile home where she was raped repeatedly and assaulted. McLauchlin was then bound with a blindfold, handcuffed, and placed on the floor inside a car.

As the men drove along a highway, McLauchlin broke free from the handcuffs and tried to escape. Gardner then pushed her head back and shot her twice in the face. He then dumped her body along a highway in Dorchester County where he shot her another three times, killing her.

The murder was racially motivated, with Gardner making a New Year's Resolution to kill a white woman after watching news footage of the acquittal of police officers for the beating of Rodney King. The group planned to kill a white woman as revenge for "400 years of oppression", including slavery. Notes were found explaining the motive.

== Aftermath ==
All three men fled the state after the crime. Mack and Williams were arrested in January 1993, but Gardner remained a fugitive for nearly two years. He was added to the FBI Ten Most Wanted Fugitives list on May 25, 1994. He was captured in Philadelphia, Pennsylvania, on October 19, 1994, and taken back to South Carolina to face trial. Gardner was the 437th fugitive to be placed on the FBI's Ten Most Wanted fugitives list and spent nearly five months on the list before being captured.

Mack and Williams were sentenced to life in prison, while two other men who participated in the rape of McLauchlin each received less than ten years in jail as part of a plea deal. Gardner was the only person involved in the crime to receive a death sentence, as he was the one who had killed McLauchlin.

== Execution ==
Gardner was executed on December 5, 2008, via lethal injection at Broad River Correctional Institution in Columbia, South Carolina. He declined to make a final statement. However, Gardner did release a written statement through his attorney.

"I would like to apologize to the family and loved ones of Melissa McLauchlin for taking her from them and causing them so much pain. I was 22 years old then, and I am 38 now. While I have always been sorry for what I did, the passage of time has allowed me to mature, reflect and experience spiritual growth in ways that were foreign to me as a young man. I have repented for what I have done, and I am very grateful to the many people who have prayed with me and for me over the years and in my final days. I deeply regret that my actions deprived Ms. McLauchlin of the chance to marry, have children and experience life with God. I have spent years praying for her, and I encourage all people of faith to do the same."

== See also ==
- Capital punishment in South Carolina
- Capital punishment in the United States
- FBI Ten Most Wanted Fugitives, 1990s
- List of people executed in South Carolina
- List of people executed in the United States in 2008

Executions carried out in South Carolina
Preceded by James Earl Reed June 20, 2008	Joseph Gardner; December 5, 2008	Succeeded by Luke Williams February 20, 2009
Executions carried out in the United States
Preceded by Marco Allen Chapman – Kentucky November 21, 2008	Joseph Gardner – South Carolina; December 5, 2008	Succeeded by Curtis Moore – Texas January 14, 2009
