= Michael Wayne Richard =

American criminal executed in Texas

- Born: August 24, 1959; Waller County, Texas, U.S.
- Died: September 25, 2007 (aged 48); Huntsville Unit, Texas, U.S.
- Status: Executed by lethal injection
- Convictions: Capital murder Burglary of a habitation (2 counts); Felony theft (2 counts); Forgery
- Penalty: Death

Details
- Victims: 1
- Date: August 18, 1986
- Weapon: .25 caliber pistol

Michael Wayne Richard (August 24, 1959 – September 25, 2007) was an American man who was convicted of rape and murder. He was executed for his crimes in the state of Texas in 2007. His execution gained notoriety due to controversies regarding procedural problems related to the timing of the execution. Richard admitted he was involved in the murder and offered to help find the murder weapon. Police found the weapon and testing revealed it to be the gun that fired the fatal shot.

== Crime ==
On August 18, 1986, in Hockley, Texas, while on parole for motor vehicle theft, Richard entered the home of Marguerite Lucille Dixon, stole two television sets, raped Dixon, fatally shot her, and then stole her van. In the wake of the Supreme Court of the United States expressing interest in the question of the constitutionality of lethal injections, on the same day that the execution was scheduled, Richard's lawyers sought a stay of execution.

== Trial and execution ==
The stay request had to be filed with the Texas Court of Criminal Appeals in Austin. The execution was scheduled for 6 PM, but the court's clerks office, where motions are usually filed, was scheduled to close at 5 PM, and refused to remain open beyond then to allow a later filing. Richard's lawyers claimed that, because of a computer failure, they did not reach the Court of Criminal Appeals until about 5:20 p.m. Although there was a judge on call to receive emergency stay motions, and although Texas law would have allowed the stay application to be filed directly with a judge of the court, the lawyers did not attempt to contact any of them. However, Richard's legal team did call the court to ask for a short extension of time to file a motion based on a case, Baze v. Rees, that had just been granted certiorari by the United States Supreme Court earlier that day. Judge Sharon Keller responded with four words: "We close at 5." Richard was subsequently executed at 8:23 p.m. on September 25, 2007, at Huntsville, Texas.

== Aftermath ==
On February 19, 2009, the Texas State Commission on Judicial Conduct brought seven charges against Judge Sharon Keller, alleging ethical improprieties in Keller's handling of the case.

A Special Master who had previously been a judge in the Court of Criminal Appeals was assigned to the case. He found the Texas Defender Service to be primarily at fault in the failure, and although he found that Keller's actions were inadequate, he concluded that her conduct was not "so egregious" as to warrant further punishment. The Special Master cast doubt on a number of the reported issues in the case. He concluded that there was no evidence that the Texas Defender Service suffered any "major" computer failure; although news reports had mentioned multiple crashes, the only claim that the TDS repeated during the hearings was that there had been some problems with an internal email service, and no documentation of those problems was produced.

Contrary to one of Richard's lawyers' earlier comments about the court refusing to stay open "20 minutes", the Special Master found the filings were not ready until 5:56 p.m., with the execution authorized for any time after 6:00 p.m. He also found fault with the attorneys for assigning only a junior attorney to prepare the documents; for delaying two hours past the US Supreme Court's grant of certiorari in Baze v. Rees earlier that day, which opened a new avenue for appeal, before even discussing preparing a motion in Richard's case; and for relying on paralegals to contact the clerk's office about the filing, without any attorneys attempting to directly contact a judge or the Court of Criminal Appeal's General Counsel. The Special Master criticized the TDS for "causing a public uproar against Judge Keller, much of which was unwarranted".

Richard is buried at Captain Joe Byrd Cemetery.

For 17 years, starting in the 1990s, Richard regularly corresponded with English woman Lesley Moreland, whose daughter had been murdered in the United Kingdom in 1990. Moreland is a committed Quaker, and her exchange with Richard, was influenced by her personal faith and conviction that there is humanity in everyone, even the most condemned criminal. This correspondence was part of a wider letter-writing network established by LifeLines in the UK, an organisation that connected Britons with death row inmates, as part of a program that was opposed to capital punishment in the United States.

== See also ==
- Capital punishment in Texas
- Capital punishment in the United States
- List of people executed in Texas, 2000–2009
- List of people executed in the United States in 2007
