= Thomas Bowling =

American murderer

- Born: Thomas Clyde Bowling Jr. January 18, 1953; Buckhorn, Kentucky, U.S.
- Died: March 21, 2015 (aged 62); Kentucky State Reformatory, Oldham County, Kentucky, U.S.
- Convictions: Murder (2 counts); Fourth degree assault
- Penalty: Death

Details
- Victims: 2

Thomas Clyde Bowling Jr. (January 18, 1953 – March 21, 2015) was an American convicted murderer who unsuccessfully challenged the constitutionality of his death sentence.

Bowling was convicted and sentenced to death for the April 9, 1990, murders of Tina and Eddie Earley. Bowling shot the Earleys dead after ramming their car outside their small dry-cleaning business in the city of Lexington, Kentucky. Bowling also shot the couple's two-year-old son, but the child survived. Thomas Bowling was arrested on April 11, in neighboring Tennessee. His car and a .357 caliber handgun were found hidden at his family's home in rural Kentucky.

Bowling's attorneys pursued appeals and clemency on the grounds of potential innocence and mental illness. Bowling died of cancer at the prison's nursing facility, aged 62.

== Appeal ==
Bowling's lawyers claim the evidence against him is purely circumstantial, and there are other suspects for the murder. Bowling was assessed at the age of 12–13 to have an IQ of 74 which, given the margin of error, placed him within the range for intellectual disability. In addition, he had a documented history of adaptive deficits, being described as a "follower" and easily manipulated. Throughout school, his parents had to lay his clothes out for him and ensure that he bathed and maintained personal hygiene. Bowling was a slow learner throughout school; he had to repeat the ninth grade twice, and failed health class three years in a row.

Bowling's lawyers also argue that there was no physical evidence placing him at the scene of the crime; an eye-witness failed to identify him; ballistics experts admitted the weapon linked to him was one of millions that could have been used in the crime; and while the car used in the crime was his, there was no proof that he was driving it at the time. Further, the state did not establish a motive for Thomas Bowling to kill the Earley couple, whom he did not know and had never met.

The lawyers assert that a local family murdered the Earleys. According to the petition and accompanying police reports, Eddie Earley told police about a local Lexington family's alleged drug activity, which resulted in an arrest. The family then had a motive for a shooting. Bowling's lawyers argue that the family apparently used Bowling's vehicle in the murder. On the day of the murders, Bowling was intoxicated and states that he cannot remember anything of that day. However, he was told by members of the above family later that afternoon to take his car out of town.

== Supreme Court ==
In 2004 Bowling sued the Kentucky State Department of Corrections along with fellow inmate Ralph Baze on the grounds that execution by lethal injection constitutes cruel and unusual punishment in violation of the Eighth Amendment to the United States Constitution. Baze's court case was Baze v. Rees. On April 16, 2008, the U.S. Supreme Court, by a 7–2 vote, rejected the challenge to the use of lethal injections to execute prisoners.

== See also ==
- List of death row inmates in the United States
