= Alvin Andrew Kelly =

Executed American serial killer

- Born: March 14, 1951; Culberson County, Texas, U.S.
- Died: October 14, 2008 (aged 57); Huntsville Unit, Huntsville, Texas, U.S.
- Cause of death: Execution by lethal injection
- Other name: Doyle Gilbreath
- Convictions: Capital murder Murder; Aggravated sexual assault
- Penalty: Death (Morgans); 35 years (Ford); 25 years (sexual assaults)

Details
- Victims: 4
- Span of crimes: April 30 – June 4, 1984
- Country: United States
- State: Texas
- Date apprehended: March 31, 1990

Alvin Andrew Kelly (March 14, 1951 – October 14, 2008) was an East Texas man who committed four drug-related murders in Longview and Lake Cherokee, Texas from May to June 1984, killing two reserve marshals, their infant son, and later his roommate. Convicted and sentenced to death for the infant's murder, he was executed in 2008.

== Murders ==
=== Triple murder ===
At the time of the crimes, Kelly worked as a debt collector for Walter "WW" Shannon, a drug trafficker based in Kilgore. After somehow acquiring information that 30-year-old Jerry Glenn Morgan and his 25-year-old wife Brenda, who were reserve marshals for the city of Longview, were providing information about their illegal activities, Kelly drove to the family's mobile home in late April 1984 together with his brother Steven and 27-year-old drug dealer Ronnie Lee Wilson. While Steven remained in the car, Kelly and Wilson went inside, where an argument erupted between Kelly and Jerry Morgan. Kelly then pulled out a gun, tackled Jerry to the ground, and started beating him with the gun, claiming that he could kill him whenever he wanted. Before the situation escalated further, he noticed that Steven was peeking through the window and ordered him to go back to the car, with Kelly and Wilson following him soon after.

On April 30, together with his wife Cynthia and Wilson, Kelly again drove to the Morgans' trailer. Upon arriving, he told Cynthia to stay in the car while he and Wilson went inside and went to the bedroom, where he shot and killed Jerry Morgan. The gunfire alerted Cynthia, who went inside to see Kelly pinning Brenda to the wall while the couple's 22-month-old son Devin was crying. While trying to calm the child down, Kelly shot Brenda in the neck and dragged her to the bedroom, placing her next to her deceased husband. According to Cynthia's later testimony, Brenda Morgan was still alive. She begged her for help, with Cynthia placing a towel under her head before returning to the living room to calm Devin down. At that time, Kelly followed her, took the infant from her, and held him in his arms before shooting him in the head with his pistol. After killing the child, Kelly then ordered her to return to the car, at which point he returned to the bedroom and shot Brenda again, killing her. He then placed the infant's body on top of his father's, stole some items from around the house with the help of Wilson, and promptly left. He returned to Shannon, claiming that the "job" had been done. Cynthia's sister, Violet Brownfield, later claimed that he had bragged about killing the Morgans and had even replaced the pictures featuring him and Cynthia in a photo album with those of the Morgans.

The Morgans' bodies were discovered on the next day by a concerned relative, who went to their trailer after they failed to return her phone calls. After finding their bodies, she flagged down a passing motorist and told him to call the police, saying the whole family had been murdered. After doing so and checking the bodies to make sure they were dead, the police arrived and started investigating the crime scene. Despite gathering every possible clue, questioning neighbors, and sending out a bulletin for the Morgans' missing car, a blue 1978 Pontiac Catalina, authorities were initially unable to determine a motive or with what weapon the victims had been shot.

=== Murder of John Ford ===
On June 9, a passer-by walking around the northern section of Lake Cherokee, discovered the severely decomposed body of a man lying face up in some shrubbery. After notifying a nearby construction worker about his discovery, the man called the police, who traveled to the area and examined the body for possible identification. As the decedent had no such documents on him, the body was sent to a forensics lab in Dallas. On the next day, using the man's fingerprints, coroners identified him as 32-year-old John Eugene Ford, a resident of Jefferson, who had been shot multiple times with a small-caliber pistol. After his identification, Ford's murder was quickly linked to the case of a burned 1974 Ford Ranchero found in Longview a week prior, which was found to belong to his father.

A few days after the discovery, Kelly was brought forward as a possible suspect in the case, as he had sought treatment at the Hart Clinic in Gladewater for gasoline burns on his body, supposedly caused while repairing a truck whose carburetor blew up. At that time, he had an arrest warrant issued for failing to appear in court on drug distribution charges. Still, as no solid evidence linked him to the killing, Kelly was considered only a person of interest.

== Investigation, arrest, and charges ==
Between 1984 and his arrest on March 31, 1990, Kelly was imprisoned several times for minor crimes. Upon his latest release, he adopted the alias of "Doyle Gilbreath" and moved to Durant, Oklahoma. A break in the case came in when a local reported finding a rusted handgun which, upon examination, was determined to have been purchased by Ford only weeks before his death. Utilizing this tip, authorities conducted further investigation and finally charged Kelly with the murder. He later pleaded guilty and was given a 35-year prison sentence, to be served concurrently with a separate 25-year prison sentence for sexual assault, concerning Kelly sexually abusing two teenage inmates while awaiting trial at the Gregg County Jail.

Five months after conviction for the Ford murder, investigators were contacted by Cynthia, who had divorced and moved away from Kelly by then. She claimed that she was willing to testify against her ex-husband in the murders of the Morgan family, claiming that she and Wilson had been present at the crime scene and had acted as accomplices. Due to these revelations, Kelly was charged with the murders, followed by the arrest and charging of Wilson as well, who had also been sought for stealing a car. Upon announcing the arrests, the Gregg County District Attorney, David Brabham, announced that he would seek the death penalty against both men. For a short time, it was believed that the killings might be related to the then-unsolved Kentucky Fried Chicken murders in Kilgore, which were later found to be unrelated.

== Trial and imprisonment ==
Before the start of the trial, one of Kelly's court-appointed attorneys, Harry Heard, filed a 24-page motion to Justice Alvin Khoury, requesting that the county establish a trust fund so they could pay the trial expenses for him and the other attorney, Elizabeth Ann Fulton. At the pre-trial hearings, Kelly and Wilson maintained their innocence, while their respective attorneys requested that they be granted written statements from Cynthia, which was denied by prosecutors, who maintained that she would act solely as a witness. When this request was denied, Heard filed a motion to have her testimony suppressed on the grounds of confidential privilege between spouses. When this did not work out either, Heard filed yet another motion to delay the trial, claiming that he wanted to locate a witness, known only as "Turtle", who he claimed could disprove Cynthia's claims, but this was, again, denied. The jury was officially sequestered on in early September 1991.

Throughout the trial, witness testimony implicating Kelly in the killings was provided by his ex-wife, his brother, and his ex-wife's sister. The latter reiterated that she was present at the crime scene. In contrast, the latter said he openly implicated himself in the murders. On the defense's side, Heard made Cynthia admit that she had lied when providing her original written statements. While making her oral testimonies, reasoning that she did not want to be implicated any further. He attempted to use this admission to invalidate her testimony by claiming she had provided facts published only in the media, but District Prosecutor Brabham pointed that some of the details she had provided had been known only to police, coupled with the fact that she had refused to cooperate out of fear for nearly seven years.

In the end, after deliberating for 73 minutes, the jury found Kelly guilty on all charges in relation to the murder of Devin Morgan, an outcome that the Morgans' family members openly welcomed. Kelly himself expressed no emotion upon hearing the verdict. Later that same day, after only half an hour of deliberation, he was sentenced to death.

== Execution ==
For the duration of his stay on death row, Kelly maintained that he was innocent and repeatedly filed appeals to the state courts, all of which upheld his convictions. He eventually exhausted all of his appeals and was scheduled for execution on October 14, 2008.

On the day of his execution, Kelly made a lengthy final statement in which he claimed that he had embraced Christianity and wanted to apologize to the family members of both the Morgans and Ford, admitting his guilt in the latter's murder but continuing to claim that he had nothing to do with the former. He was executed via lethal injection at the Huntsville Unit, spending his last moments singing a religious song dedicated to Jesus Christ. He is buried at Captain Joe Byrd Cemetery.

== See also ==
- Capital punishment in Texas
- List of people executed by lethal injection
- List of people executed in Texas, 2000–2009
- List of people executed in the United States in 2008
- List of serial killers in the United States
