= Leslie Isben Rogge =

American bank robber (born 1940)

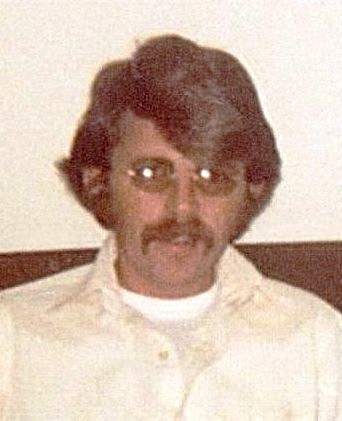
- Rogge in 1973

FBI Ten Most Wanted Fugitive
- Charges: Escape from custody; Bank robberies (4 charges)
- Alias: Bill Young

Description
- Born: March 8, 1940 (age 86); Seattle, Washington, U.S.
- Height: 5 ft 11 in (1.80 m)

Status
- Penalty: 65 years imprisonment
- Status: Imprisoned
- Added: January 24, 1990
- Caught: May 19, 1996
- Number: 430
- Captured

Leslie Isben Rogge (born March 8, 1940) is an American bank robber who was the first on the FBI's Ten Most Wanted Fugitives list to be apprehended due to the internet. He is currently serving a 65-year sentence at the Federal Correctional Institution, Sheridan.

== Biography ==
Rogge was born in Seattle, Washington on March 8, 1940.

Rogge was imprisoned at the United States Penitentiary in Leavenworth, Kansas, during the 1970s for car theft and grand larceny. He was later convicted and sentenced to 25 years for a 1984 bank robbery in Key Largo, Florida. In September 1985, he bribed a corrections officer and escaped from prison in Moscow, Idaho.

Following his escape, he went on to commit additional bank robberies, including one at an Exchange Bank branch in El Dorado, Arkansas, and at a bank in High Point, North Carolina, in 1986. On January 24, 1990, Rogge became the 430th Fugitive to be added to the FBI Ten Most Wanted Fugitives list, where he remained for the next six years. He was featured on the television program Unsolved Mysteries and on America's Most Wanted five times. In 1991, he also robbed a bank in Webb City, Missouri.

Rogge's approach involved determining which bank would be a more viable option for carrying out a robbery and meticulously planning an escape plan by deciding in which vehicle would be fastest to escape. When Rogge and his partner robbed a particular bank, they used a police scanner to monitor the state of the bank's alarm system and keep track of police activity. Meanwhile, Rogge would walk calmly and wait. When they escaped, a timed smoke bomb set the previous night would explode, providing a distraction for their escape.

== Arrest ==
On May 19, 1996, Rogge surrendered at the United States Embassy in Guatemala, after Guatemalan authorities had launched a manhunt upon being tipped off by someone who saw Rogge's photo on the FBI website. While on the run, he spent time in Antigua Guatemala, where he went by the name "Bill Young".

Rogge stole more than $2 million and robbed approximately 30 banks, and is currently serving a 65-year sentence at Federal Medical Center, Butner, in Durham County, North Carolina. His scheduled release date according to the Bureau of Prisons is May 29, 2034, at age 94.

Rogge applied for release on compassionate grounds in 2021 and 2022, citing his advanced age and failing health. Both of his requests were denied, and the U.S. Court of Appeals for the Eighth Circuit ruled in 2025 that Rogge was ineligible to seek compassionate release.
