= Eric Nenno =

American murderer and sex offender executed in Texas

Coordinates: 30.022655°N 95.80265099999997°W

- Born: Eric Charles Nenno; April 13, 1961; Olean, New York, U.S.
- Died: October 28, 2008 (aged 47); Huntsville Unit, Texas, U.S.
- Status: Executed by lethal injection
- Conviction: Capital murder
- Penalty: Death (January 1996)

Details
- Victims: 1
- Date: March 23, 1995

Eric Charles Nenno (April 13, 1961 – October 28, 2008) was a convicted sex offender who was executed for the 1995 rape and murder of seven-year-old Nicole Benton. He was executed in 2008 in Huntsville, Texas, becoming the 1128th murderer to be executed in the United States since 1976. He was the 13th murderer executed in Texas in 2008 and the 418th murderer executed in Texas since 1976.

== The case ==
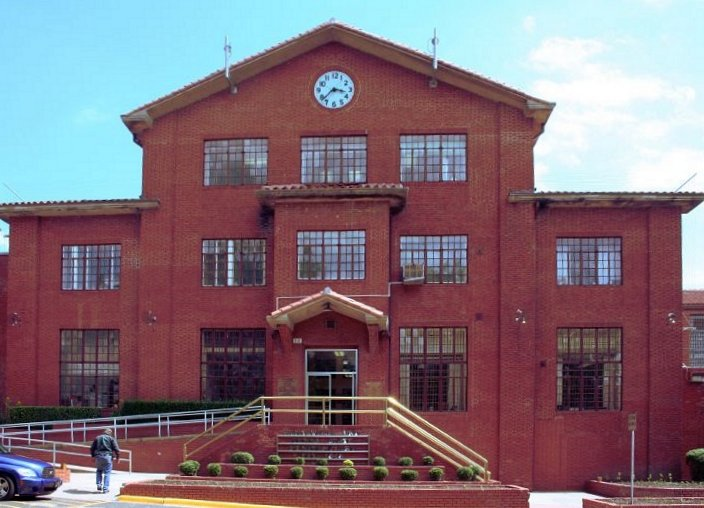
The Huntsville Unit, a Texas Department of Criminal Justice-operated prison in Huntsville, the home of the state's execution chamber

On March 23, 1995, in Hockley, Texas, Nicole Benton disappeared during a birthday party held for her father, Buddy Benton, at the house of a friend. Eric Nenno lived a few houses down the road in a house owned by relatives.

As Buddy was playing with his country music band, Nenno lured Nicole, who was playing in the front yard, to his home on the pretense of getting a guitar to join the group. The moment Nenno and Nicole were inside his home he struggled to rape her. As Nicole cried and resisted, he strangled her to death. He raped her lifeless body for several days and hid her corpse in his attic, stuffing her clothing in a filing cabinet. Nicole's polka-dot dress, glasses, and shoes were later found in this cabinet.

A few days after Nicole's disappearance, law enforcement agents showed up at Nenno's residence to question him. Neighbors had told Detective Johnson that Nenno, a former plumbing supply salesman, had been accused of groping a six-year-old neighborhood girl two years before. Johnson then referred Nenno to Detectives Wedgeworth and Taber for a follow-up investigation, and they visited Nenno's house at 17602 Bullis Gap three times on the afternoon of March 25, 1995. On two occasions Nenno did not answer the door.

On the third occasion, Nenno, dressed only in a white bath-towel around his waist, finally answered the door. Nenno indicated that he was willing to talk about the missing girl, and invited the detectives to enter the house. He seemed very cooperative and willing to speak. When the detectives asked him whether he knew Nicole, he became visibly nervous and shaky, and denied knowing or ever seeing her before. Nenno then allowed the detectives to search his house. Detective Wedgeworth conducted a brief search, but found nothing out of the ordinary.

The detectives asked Nenno why someone in the neighborhood would suggest that he be checked out. He replied that there had been an incident in the spring when he was accused of trying to lure a girl into his house and pull off her pants. After this question, Nenno became visibly shaken and much more nervous. The two detectives had been at Nenno's house for approximately ten minutes, and before leaving, asked him if he would go to the command post for further questioning. After signing a legal release, Nenno stated he had no problem with that. Police informed him that a trailer had been set up several blocks away as a command post during the ongoing search for Nicole by law enforcement and volunteers from the community of Hockley. Wedgeworth and Taber later stated that they made no promises or threats to Nenno during this initial encounter. After dressing, Nenno showed up a few minutes later at the command post and Detective Taber read Nenno his Miranda rights.

Taber asked Nenno if he understood his rights and he indicated that he did. Taber then asked him if he wanted to waive his rights and talk about the missing girl; he agreed to talk to the detectives. He appeared to understand the interview process which was conducted in a very moderate tone. Taber spoke with Nenno for almost an hour, and during the interview he was offered food and drink. From the start of the interview, Detective Taber reminded Nenno that he was not under arrest, and could leave at any time.

When Detective Taber asked Nenno if he knew why he was there, he replied: “You think I'm a suspect in the missing little girl's case”. Taber then asked him why he thought that he would be considered a suspect. Nenno replied that it was because of a past incident when he had lured a little girl to his residence and removed her pants, and because he liked children. When asked what he had done the night Nicole had disappeared, he stated that he had arrived home, changed clothes, gone outside and talked to his neighbor, and then went back inside. Nenno said he had been drinking a six-pack of beer. When asked if there was any reason why a neighbor would say that they had seen him on the same street where Nicole had disappeared, Nenno responded: “Well, maybe I could have been outside my house by the fence, but I just don't remember”. Taber asked Nenno the same question again and he replied: “Well, it might have been possible but I don't remember”.

After a polygraph, authorities remained silent for several minutes, prompting Nenno to finally say: "I failed it, didn't I?″ When the examiner told Nenno he needed to disclose the girl's location, Nenno said: "I think she's still in the attic″. He then said: "They're going to kill me for this, aren't they?"

Finally Nenno gave written authorization to law enforcement to search his home. During the search of Nenno's house, Nicole's body was found and Nenno was arrested. Nicole had been choked to death and raped repeatedly.

In his confession, Nenno admitted to having sexual fantasies about young girls for most of his life, as well raping and strangling Nicole in his bedroom.

== Sentencing ==
On February 1, 1996, the Harris County jury, that heard the case, deliberated for about 11 hours, before deciding on the death penalty for Eric Nenno.

In an interview from death row one week before his scheduled execution, Nenno said that, at the time of the killing, he was addicted to pornography and had been drinking. He also said that nothing could excuse his crime. "I can't apologize enough", he said.

== Procedural history ==
On January 18, 1996, a Harris County jury convicted Nenno of capital murder; he was sentenced to death by the District Court in Harris County on February 1. The Texas Court of Criminal Appeals affirmed Nenno's conviction and sentence on June 24, 1998. Nenno filed an application for state habeas corpus on October 16, 1998, but was denied relief on November 14, 2001. Nenno petitioned the federal courts for writ of habeas corpus relief on October 18, 2002; the federal district court dismissed Nenno's case without prejudice on January 13, 2004. Nenno filed a successive application for state habeas corpus relief on February 11, 2004, which was dismissed by the Texas Court of Criminal Appeals on June 23, 2004. On August 10, 2004, Nenno returned to federal court, and petitioned for habeas relief. On March 7, 2006, the U.S. District Court denied habeas relief, and denied a COA. The Fifth Circuit Court of Appeals denied his application for a COA on June 6, 2007. On March 24, 2008, the U. S. Supreme Court denied certiorari review. On June 10, 2008, Nenno petitioned for clemency with the Texas Board of Pardons and Paroles.

== Execution ==
On October 28, 2008, Eric Charles Nenno was executed by lethal injection in Huntsville Unit in Texas. Nenno did not look at Buddy Benton or the other members of the victim's family who attended his execution. When asked if he wanted to make a last statement, he replied, "No, warden." The lethal injection was then started. He gasped four times and, eight minutes later at 6:20 p.m., Nenno was pronounced dead. He is buried at Captain Joe Byrd Cemetery.

== Final meal ==
His last meal was a grilled cheeseburger, four fish patties, six hard boiled eggs, and coffee.

== See also ==
- List of people executed in Texas, 2000–2009
- List of people executed in the United States in 2008
