= Ralph Baze =

American murderer on death row

- Ralph Baze, Kentucky State Penitentiary
- Born: July 1, 1955 (age 71)
- Motive: To avoid arrest
- Conviction: Murder (2 counts)
- Penalty: Death

Details
- Victims: Steve Bennett and Arthur Briscoe
- Date: January 30, 1992
- Country: United States
- Imprisoned at: Kentucky State Penitentiary

Ralph Stephens Baze Jr. (born July 1, 1955) is an American convicted murderer who sued the Kentucky State Department of Corrections along with fellow inmate Thomas Clyde Bowling Jr. to challenge their impending execution. He and Bowling sued on the grounds that execution by lethal injection using the "cocktail" prescribed by Kentucky law constitutes cruel and unusual punishment in violation of the 8th Amendment. Baze's court case was Baze v. Rees.

Baze had been scheduled for execution on September 25, 2007, but, on September 12, was issued a stay of execution by the Kentucky Supreme Court. The United States Supreme Court agreed to hear his appeal. On April 16, 2008, the Court affirmed the Kentucky Supreme Court's decision that the injection protocol does not violate the Eighth Amendment.

Baze does not dispute that he shot and killed Powell County, Kentucky Sheriff Steve Bennett and Deputy Arthur Briscoe in 1992 as they attempted to serve an arrest warrant on him, but claims that the shootings were self-defense.

Baze is incarcerated on death row in Kentucky State Penitentiary in Eddyville, Kentucky. In June 2025, Kentucky Attorney General Russell Coleman asked Governor Andy Beshear to sign a death warrant to bring forward Baze's execution, but Beshear declined, citing a 2010 court ruling that suspended executions by lethal injection in Kentucky. In November, Coleman sought a court order to overrule Beshear's objections.

== See also ==
- List of death row inmates in the United States
