= O'Neil Vassell =

American murderer (born 1976)

O'Neill Vassell
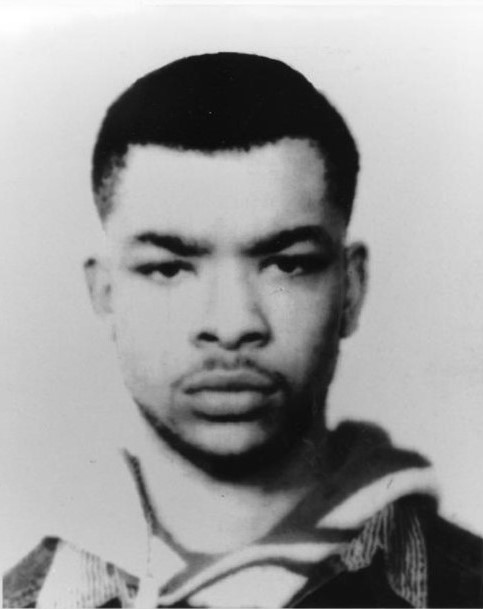
- Photograph Taken February 24, 1994

FBI Ten Most Wanted Fugitive
- Charges: Drug-related triple homicide in Bridgeport, Connecticut

Description
- Born: O'Neill Vassell; September 27, 1976 (age 49); Brooklyn, New York, U.S.
- Nationality: American
- Gender: Male

Status
- Added: July 1995
- Caught: October 16, 1996
- Number: 443
- Captured

O'Neill Vassell (born September 27, 1976) is an American criminal of Jamaican descent and a former member of the FBI Ten Most Wanted Fugitives list who was added as number 443. Vassell was sought for the murder of three Connecticut men in connection with the drug trade in 1993, as well as assaults on others in Bridgeport, and Durham, North Carolina.

== Charges and capture ==
In July 1995, he was placed on the Most Wanted list for suspicion of the murders. In one murder, a man was shot 13 times at a basketball court. In the other two, occupants of two vehicles fired at each other while speeding through a residential neighborhood. Vassell's gang, the "Rats", were feuding with the "Cats" over control of Bridgeport's cocaine trade. At the time of his matriculation, he has last been spotted in New York City, and was believed to be armed with a 9mm semiautomatic handgun. He was considered extremely dangerous. He was known to be associated with a Jamaican drug ring, the "Rats". He was officially federally warranted with the charge of "unlawful flight to avoid prosecution for murder."

On October 16, 1996, a nighttime raid conducted by the FBI and the NYPD was executed on a Brooklyn apartment, and Vassell was captured. He was unarmed and did not resist when cornered in the Canarsie residence. He has been sought by CT law enforcement since 1993. In 1997, while awaiting trial for the Bridgeport murders, he was charged and convicted of distributing a letter from prison, upon which allegedly an incitement to murder a gang member was encoded. The Connecticut Supreme Court went on to reverse this decision.

Vassell was convicted of two murders and sentenced to 120 years in prison. In 2021, Vassell became eligible for parole under a new law expanding parole eligibility for youthful offenders. However, he was denied early release in 2021.
