= Baze v. Rees =

- Supreme Court of the United States

Argued January 7, 2008 Decided April 16, 2008
- Full case name: Ralph Baze and Thomas C. Bowling v. John Dewitt Rees, Commissioner, Kentucky Department of Corrections
- Docket no.: 07-5439
- Citations: 553 U.S. 35 (more) 128 S. Ct. 1520; 170 L. Ed. 2d 420
- Argument: Oral argument

Case history
- Prior: 217 S.W.3d 207 (Ky. 2007); cert. granted, 551 U.S. 1192 (2007); order modified, 552 U.S. 945 (2007).

Holding
- Cocktail using three drugs for execution by lethal injection in Kentucky is constitutional under the Eighth Amendment.

Court membership
- Chief Justice John Roberts Associate Justices John P. Stevens · Antonin Scalia; Anthony Kennedy · David Souter; Clarence Thomas · Ruth Bader Ginsburg; Stephen Breyer · Samuel Alito

Case opinions
- Plurality: Roberts, joined by Kennedy, Alito
- Concurrence: Alito
- Concurrence: Stevens (in judgment)
- Concurrence: Scalia (in judgment), joined by Thomas
- Concurrence: Thomas (in judgment), joined by Scalia
- Concurrence: Breyer (in judgment)
- Dissent: Ginsburg, joined by Souter

Laws applied
- U.S. Const. amend. VIII

Baze v. Rees, 553 U.S. 35 (2008), is a decision by the United States Supreme Court, which upheld the constitutionality of a particular method of lethal injection used for capital punishment.

== Background of the case ==
Ralph Baze and Thomas Bowling were sentenced to death in Kentucky, each for a double-murder. Baze shot and killed officers Steve Bennett and Arthur Briscoe in 1992 while they were serving multiple warrants against him. Bowling shot and killed Eddie and Tina Earley outside their dry cleaning business in 1990. The two argued that executing them by lethal injection would violate the Eighth Amendment prohibition of cruel and unusual punishment. The governing legal standard required that lethal injection must not inflict "unnecessary pain", and Baze and Bowling argued that the lethal chemicals Kentucky used carried an unnecessary risk of inflicting pain during the execution. Kentucky at the time used the then-common combination of sodium thiopental, pancuronium bromide, and potassium chloride. The Supreme Court of Kentucky rejected their claim, but the U.S. Supreme Court granted certiorari.

The case had nationwide implications because the specific "cocktail" used for lethal injections in Kentucky was the same one that virtually all states used for lethal injection. The U.S. Supreme Court stayed all executions in the country between September 2007 and April 2008, when it delivered its ruling and affirmed the Kentucky top court decision. It is the longest period with zero executions in the United States from 1982 to date.

== Supreme Court's decision ==
The Supreme Court upheld Kentucky's method of lethal injection as constitutional by a vote of 7–2. No single opinion carried a majority. Chief Justice Roberts wrote a plurality opinion joined by Justice Kennedy and Justice Alito, that was later ruled to be the controlling opinion in Glossip v. Gross (2015).

Justice Alito wrote an opinion concurring with the plurality reasoning, while Justices Stevens, Scalia, Thomas and Breyer wrote opinions concurring in the judgment only.

Justice Ginsburg, joined by Justice Souter, wrote the lone dissent.

=== Plurality opinion ===
The plurality opinion was written by Chief Justice John Roberts and joined by Justices Anthony Kennedy and Samuel Alito, held that Kentucky's execution method was humane and constitutional. In response to the petitioners' argument that the risk of mistakes in the execution protocol was so great as to render it unconstitutional, the plurality wrote that "an isolated mishap alone does not violate the Eighth Amendment". It also stated that the first drug in a multi-drug cocktail must render the inmate unconscious. Otherwise, there is a "substantial, constitutionally unacceptable risk" that the inmate will suffer a painful suffocation.

=== Stevens' concurrence ===
Justice John Paul Stevens concurred in the opinion of the Court, writing separately to explain his concerns with the death penalty in general. He wrote that the case questioned the "justification for the death penalty itself". He characterized the motivation behind the death penalty as an antithesis to modern values:

We are left, then, with retribution as the primary rationale for imposing the death penalty. And indeed, it is the retribution rationale that animates much of the remaining enthusiasm for the death penalty. As Lord Justice Denning argued in 1950, "'some crimes are so outrageous that society insists on adequate punishment, because the wrong-doer deserves it, irrespective of whether it is a deterrent or not.'" See Gregg, 428 U. S., at 184, n. 30. Our Eighth Amendment jurisprudence has narrowed the class of offenders eligible for the death penalty to include only those who have committed outrageous crimes defined by specific aggravating factors. It is the cruel treatment of victims that provides the most persuasive arguments for prosecutors seeking the death penalty. A natural response to such heinous crimes is a thirst for vengeance.

He further stressed concern over the process of death penalty cases where emotion plays a major role and where the safeguards for defendants may have been lowered. He cited statistics that indicated that many people sentenced to die were later found to be wrongly convicted. He concluded by stating that a penalty "with such negligible returns to the State [is] patently excessive and cruel and unusual punishment violative of the Eighth Amendment".

=== Scalia's concurrence ===
Justice Scalia, joined by Justice Thomas, wrote separately "to provide what I think is needed response to Justice Stevens' separate opinion":

In the fact of Justice Stevens' experience, the experience of all others is, it appears, of little consequence. The experience of the state legislatures and the Congress—who retain the death penalty as a form of punishment—is dismissed as "the product of habit and inattention rather than an acceptable deliberative process". The experience of social scientists whose studies indicate that the death penalty deters crime is relegated to a footnote. The experience of fellow citizens who support the death penalty is described, with only the most thinly veiled condemnation, as stemming from a "thirst for vengeance". It is Justice Stevens' experience that reigns over all.

Justice Stevens' final refuge in his cost-benefit analysis is a familiar one: There is a risk that an innocent person might be convicted and sentenced to death—though not a risk that Justice Stevens can quantify, because he lacks a single example of a person executed for a crime he did not commit in the current American system.

But of all Justice Stevens' criticisms of the death penalty, the hardest to take is his bemoaning of "the enormous costs that death penalty litigation imposes on society," including the "burden on the courts and the lack of finality for victim's families." Those costs, those burdens, and that lack of finality are in large measure the creation of Justice Stevens and other Justices opposed to the death penalty, who have "encumber[ed] [it] … with unwarranted restrictions neither contained in the text of the Constitution nor reflected in two centuries of practice under it"—the product of their policy views "not shared by the vast majority of the American people.

=== Dissent ===
In a dissenting opinion joined by Justice Souter, Justice Ginsburg challenged the constitutionality of Kentucky's three-drug lethal injection protocol.

Justice Ginsburg highlighted the excruciating pain caused by the second and third drugs, pancuronium bromide and potassium chloride, arguing that their use on a conscious inmate would have been "constitutionally unacceptable." While the plurality argued that Kentucky's protocol was constitutional because it lacked substantial evidence of an inadequate dose of the first drug, sodium thiopental, Justice Ginsburg disagreed. She asserted that Kentucky's protocol lacked basic safeguards used by other states to confirm an inmate's unconsciousness before administering subsequent drugs.

Examining previous Supreme Court cases on execution methods, Justice Ginsburg found limited guidance on the standard for evaluating Kentucky's lethal injection protocol. She emphasized the evolving standards of decency and the need to consider the severity of pain, likelihood of occurrence, and feasibility of alternatives. While the plurality set a fixed threshold for the risk factor, Justice Ginsburg argued that the three factors were interconnected, and a strong showing in one area reduced the importance of others.

== See also ==
- Lethal injection
- Wilkerson v. Utah (1878)
- Glossip v. Gross (2015)
- Bucklew v. Precythe (2019)

== Bibliography ==
- Linda Greenhouse. "Justices to Enter the Debate Over Lethal Injection". The New York Times, September 26, 2007.
- "Supreme Court clears way for executions to resume" Reuters, April 16, 2008.
