= Crime in Arizona =

In 2014, 242,156 crimes were reported in the U.S. state of Arizona.

== Statistics ==
Arizona crime rates 1960–2014
Year	Population	Total	Rate (per 100,000)	Violent crimes		Property crimes	
Year	Population	Total	Rate (per 100,000)	Total	Rate (per 100,000)	Total	Rate (per 100,000)
1960	1,302,161	39,243	3,013.7	2,704	207.7	36,539	2,806.0
1965	1,608,000	57,049	3,547.8	3,092	192.3	53,957	3,355.5
1970	1,772,482	104,829	5,914.2	6,564	370.3	98,265	5,543.9
1975	2,224,000	185,515	8,341.5	12,184	547.8	173,331	7,793.7
1980	2,715,357	221,866	8,170.8	17,673	650.9	204,193	7,519.9
1985	3,187,000	226,793	7,116.2	19,202	602.5	207,591	6,513.7
1990	3,665,228	289,140	7,888.7	23,911	652.4	265,229	7,236.4
1995	4,218,000	346,450	8,213.6	30,095	713.5	316,355	7,500.1
2000	5,130,632	299,092	5,829.5	27,281	531.7	271,811	5,297.8
2005	5,953,007	317,823	5,351.2	30,478	512.0	287,345	4,838.0
2010	6,413,158	253,330	3,950.1	26,528	413.6	226,802	3,536.5
2014	6,731,484	242,156	3,597.4	26,916	399.9	215,240	3,197.5

== Capital punishment laws ==
Capital punishment is applied in Arizona. In most circumstances, the method used is lethal injection. Inmates sentenced to death for murders committed prior to November 23, 1992 may choose lethal gas.

== Notable Cases ==
1982 - Murder of Carolyn Eaton

1984 - Murder of Christy Fornoff and Murder of Vicki Lynne Hoskinson

1986 - Murder of Zosha Pickett

1988 - Murder of Jennifer Wilson

1991 - Waddell Buddhist temple shooting and Meyers-Snyder murders

1995 - Ernesto Salgado Martinez

1996 - 1996 Tucson murders

2009 - Murder of Raul and Brisenia Flores

2015 - Murder of Allison Feldman

2018 - Death of Elaine Herzberg

== See also ==
- List of people executed in Arizona
- Category:Criminals from Arizona
