= 1977 Arizona armored car robbery =

1977 robbery of an armored car

The 1977 Arizona armored car robbery was an armed robbery of an armored car that took place along Interstate 17 in which the two guards of the car were murdered. The robbery was committed by brothers Michael Kent Poland and Patrick Gene Poland. Both brothers were eventually executed for their parts in the crime, becoming one of two sets of brothers executed in Arizona, the others being the LaGrands.

The story was featured in episode 6, season 4 of The FBI Files on December 4, 2001.

== Description of crime ==
On May 24, 1977, guards Russel Dempsey and Cecil Newkirk were on duty for Purolator Courier. They were driving along I-17 when a vehicle they thought was a police car pulled them over. After pulling over, the men, whom they believed to be police officers, ordered them to open the truck, after which the Poland brothers took over. The drivers of the security van were bundled into bags and dumped into Lake Mead. The brothers had claimed that one guard had died of a heart attack, so they had to kill the other. They had stolen $228,000 during the robbery.

== Investigation ==
The investigation first focused on the two missing couriers. Both were ruled out as suspects when their wives reported that they had no financial problems, and their employer reported that each courier had faithfully worked for the company for over 20 years.

The van was eventually found in the remote desert near the town of Bumble Bee. Though the couriers were not there, blood was found in the back of the van, along with several thousand dollars in coins. The truck's doors were locked until a spare set of keys was brought to unlock them. Upon examination, it was discovered that the vehicle's radio was found to be left on, but the base received no distress calls. Also the van's siren had not been tripped, and an unfired shotgun was found in the back. US$293,000 worth of paper currency was missing.

After the discovery, the FBI had local news agencies make the news public. Several motorists called in, reporting that they saw the van stopped on the northbound side of Interstate 17 on the morning of May 24, the exact date when the guards were reported missing. One motorist said he saw a pair of Arizona Department of Public Safety officers walking towards the van, and other witnesses had similar stories, but in their accounts, the make and model of the officers' car varied, while others claimed to have seen the police cruiser stopped in front of the armored van.

After checking with the Arizona Department of Public Safety, they learned that none of their officers remembered stopping an armored van on Interstate 17 on May 24, so it was believed that the person seen by the witnesses was masquerading as a police officer. Several motorists underwent hypnosis to provide details of that officer to a sketch artist but there were different results.

Mojave County Sheriff's Deputy Dale Lent and FBI agents processed the spot where the armored car was believed to have been stopped. Digs and gouges in the dirt indicated that there had been a struggle near the rear of the van. In addition, tire tracks from a second vehicle were found, consistent with the tire tracks found in the remote area near where the armored van had been abandoned; however, those same tracks were also found in front of the spot where the van had been pulled over.

On June 16, 1977, 300 miles northwest of where the armored van had been abandoned, a body in a black canvas bag was discovered in Debbie's Cove in Lake Mead by a pair of anglers. The men contacted the National Park Service, who sped to the scene along with investigators and local officers. After recovering the body, a wallet was found in the back pocket, and the victim was identified as Cecil Newkirk, one of the two missing courier guards. Continuing the search found no sign of the second courier. The guard's personal effects were removed, including his self-winding watch, which stopped working at 10:37 p.m on May 26. A subsequent autopsy indicated that the guard found had been severely beaten and had two large welts consistent with those inflicted by a high voltage taser gun. The location of the body indicated a boat was used, so agents collected boat rental receipts to check for names.

During the next few weeks, FBI agents canvassed area service stations until one station owner reported his suspicions. The day after the robbery, he had towed the pickup truck of two men who claimed to be fishing and had inadvertently backed into Lake Mead at a boat ramp named Bonelli Landing. Though there did not seem to be any fishing equipment in the back, there were drag marks in the vehicle's bed. The receipt for the towing had the signature of Michael Poland.

An exhaustive search of boat rental receipts turned up one with the name Michael Poland for a boat rental to Bonelli Landing, where the pickup had been towed. Agents returned to Lake Mead, and after searching between Bonelli Landing and the boat rental shop across the shore, Russel Dempsey's body was recovered along with a garrote made out of two pieces of wood and rope and a second black canvas bag nearby, containing a blanket and tarp.

An autopsy revealed that he had suffered a heart attack and had been strangled. A hair sample from the garrote confirmed it was used to strangle him. An intensified search yielded a 3rd canvas bag similar to the first few bags used to cover the courier guards' corpses, which contained two corroded revolvers, concrete dust caked in the weave of the bag, and, more crucially, a license plate similar to the ones used on Arizona Department of Public Safety cruisers. The service station owner identified Michael Poland in a picture lineup.

Investigators eventually located Michael Poland, and they observed that he did not appear gainfully employed, but he had recently purchased a new motorcycle. Investigators identified a man who frequently visited as Michael's younger brother, Patrick. He had just bought a new car. Michael's teenaged son told them his father had recently bought two new motorcycles and a lot more. Further investigation revealed that both brothers were in financial trouble, but after the robbery, their debts had been paid completely, and they had purchased new vehicles, spending money beyond their legal means.

The Poland brothers' father said both brothers had borrowed his truck and a tarp on the day of the robbery and that the brothers gave him a new tarp saying the old one got ruined when they returned the truck. The father also had mixed concrete in the bed several weeks before the heist. Examinations revealed the same batch of concrete that left the dust stuck in the canvas bag recovered at Lake Mead. However, the station owner could not positively identify Patrick Poland, but he did confirm that their father's pickup truck was the one he towed from Bonelli Landing.

On July 27, 1977, agents arrived at Michael Poland's house with a search warrant, but he claimed that he was in Las Vegas buying jewels on the day of the heist. Several gems and $12,000 in cash were found, and Michael claimed they were for his jewel business. Two handcuff cases, a law enforcement belt, and a siren were also found. Several receipts were confiscated, including a receipt for two taser guns sold one month before the robbery and law enforcement gear.

However, when Patrick Poland was asked about the robbery, he said they were at Lake Mead fishing but had difficulties answering other questions. His brother Michael later called him to tell him not to talk to investigators. A search of Patrick's house yielded a stash of weapons, $16,000 in cash, another siren, and a belt with a space for a badge. After much investigation, it was revealed that neither of the cars the brothers owned before the robbery left the tire tracks found near the crime scene. The clerk of the gun store, which sold the tasers to Mark Harris, could only remember Mark Harris as a white male in his 20s.

Ten months of surveillance on the brothers revealed the brothers closing a deal on a gaming arcade, but there was insufficient evidence for an arrest warrant, so agents focused on determining where the black canvas bags came from. That paid off when one store owner recognized the bags as coming from his company and the special cord from a company in Georgia. The owner gave receipts he had left from years of business, and after much searching, a receipt for three custom-sized black canvas bags was found to have been sold to Mark Harris, similar to the taser receipt found during a search of Michael Poland's home months earlier which convinced agents that Mark Harris was an alias for Michael Poland.

== Arrests ==
On May 18, 1978, after nearly a year of investigation, a Federal Grand Jury returned an indictment against the Poland brothers for robbery, kidnapping and murder. However, FBI agents suspected that both brothers would not surrender quietly, so they decided to arrest them away from their homes, fearing a shootout. Michael Poland went to a real-estate office while Patrick went to the game arcade. When Patrick Poland reached the arcade, the FBI arrest team tried to capture him before he entered. However, he surrendered without a fight, and they later found a stash of weapons in his car, including a .44 Magnum gun.

Eventually, despite the risks, the second arrest team entered the real estate office and arrested Michael Poland uneventfully. However, he refused to answer questions and insisted his brother do the same. No fingerprints linked them to the murdered guards or the armored car.

== Trials and convictions ==
State and federal prosecutors split the charges, and the Poland brothers went on trial for robbery and kidnapping in federal court on February 15, 1979, were found guilty on those charges based on the circumstantial evidence alone, and were sentenced to 100 years in prison. In November 1979, an Arizona state jury returned the guilty verdict for murder, which meant the death penalty for both of them, but they appealed their convictions. The Arizona Supreme Court found that the testimony of a hypnotized witness and the taser gun evidence should not have been used. They also found out that the jury had inappropriately discussed the federal trial, which meant their murder convictions were overturned, and parole laws at the time meant they would be eligible for parole in less than seven years.

In 1982, an Arizona prosecutor declined a retrial for the brothers due to cost and evidence already excluded by the Arizona Supreme Court. U.S. Attorney A. Melvin McDonald, outraged that the Poland brothers would possibly get away with murder, was deputized as an Arizona State Prosecutor. Despite evidence difficulties, prosecutors decided to try to determine the time the victims had been deposited in Lake Mead and prove that it was the same time the Polands were at the lake. After much pondering, a crucial piece of evidence was found in the form of Cecil Newkirk's self-winding watch, which stopped working at 10:37 p.m. on May 26, 1977. That particular watch would stop working if it were not moved for 12 hours, which meant it stopped working 12 hours after the deceased guard's arm came to rest at the bottom of Lake Mead. But to prove it, they had watch experts from Switzerland examine it to determine that the watch did not stop due to water damage. Forensics experts used this evidence to estimate when the bodies had been dumped into the water. Their estimation matched the time the FBI had established that the Polands were at the lake, getting their pickup towed from Bonelli Landing. The prosecutor explained that the Polands had been there to dump the bodies, which convinced the jury to return the guilty verdicts for the murder of Russel Dempsey and Cecil Newkirk on November 18, 1982. The defendants appealed again, but this time, the United States Supreme Court affirmed the death sentences for the Polands.

In 1997, the brothers brought separate cases against the State of Arizona, stating that they had not been informed that their conduct could result in the death penalty, which the judge rejected.

In 1998, Michael Poland's lawyers argued that he could not be executed because he had to complete his federal sentence first, which was due to finish in 2045.

== Attempted escape ==
In 1997, Michael Poland's cell on Death Row was searched and found to include an escape plan, handcuff keys, a suicide drug, several knives, and a lock pick. The plan was foiled when he offered $2 million to a prison guard to help him escape.

== Patrick Poland's confession ==
In 1987, Patrick Poland agreed to tell investigators and the victims' families exactly what happened. FBI Special Agent Frank Mallory (Rtd.) took his confession. Prior to the robbery, the Polands had spent almost a year tailing the van. They knew of its route on the mornings when it went to Prescott and delivered the money to the banks in Prescott, the route it took, the stops it made, and the times for the stops.

For the heist it was decided that neither of the brothers' own cars would be used. They rented one, which investigators could not conclusively find. They put on an emergency lighting system, a siren that could be turned on with a simple switch, and a license plate similar to the one used by the Arizona Highway Patrol and the department's door decals. They readied their tools needed for the heist, including a uniform similar to the one used by the Arizona Highway Patrol to be worn, and went to an ideal spot to wait. They planned to stop the van on the pretext of speeding and then go to a remote spot to steal the money. A problem with the van's side door latch meant they were delayed for an hour, and the brothers had to wait for that hour. But when they saw it, they put their plan into action. Michael hid under the dash while Patrick drove the car.

After pulling the armored car over, Patrick went to the side of the van and approached the guards, and asked the driver to step out. Company protocol indicates that drivers never leave their vehicles between stops, even for police, but for some reason, the driver exited. Then Michael went to the other side of the armored car, and the brothers took the guards captive. Patrick Poland continued to drive the fake police vehicle while the other was to drive the armored truck. However, when Patrick left, his brother did not follow, so he reversed the fake cruiser in front of the armored car and proceeded to see what was happening. By the time he reached the back, Michael was already beating the two guards, and Patrick told him to stop, and Michael went to get a pair of stun guns which they used to stun the guards. The brothers drove the vehicles to a remote area near the town of Bumble Bee, where they abandoned the truck.

Patrick's decision to reverse the car to a spot in front of the van left the tire tracks, which investigators would later find. In the remote area, after seeing that one of the couriers seemed to have died from the beating, Michael Poland made up his mind, retrieved a makeshift garrote from his pocket, and strangled the other courier to death. They took the money, totaling $293,000, and then took the couriers' bodies to Lake Mead, where they dumped the bodies using a rented boat. After the crimes, they buried the rest of the money in the desert. Although a female relative of theirs also knew the location of the money, over the years following the robbery it rotted where it had been buried. Due to her cooperation in the case, the relative was not prosecuted.

== Executions ==
1998 Mugshot of Michael Kent Poland

2000 Mugshot of Patrick Gene Poland

After his lawyers tried multiple appeals for the death sentence to be commuted to life because the time he had spent waiting on death row had made him insane, all of which were denied, the State of Arizona administered a lethal injection to Michael Poland on June 16, 1999.

He requested, for his last meal: three fried eggs sunny side up; four slices of bacon, an order of hash browns, two slices of whole wheat toast with two pats of real butter, two individual serving size boxes of Raisin Bran cereal, two cartons of milk, and two cups of Tasters Choice coffee.

In the execution chamber, Michael raised his head several times to look at the window into the witness chamber as his death warrant was being read. The last words he mouthed to two of his sons and a daughter-in-law who witnessed the execution were simply, "I love you."

The lethal injection procedure for Michael Poland was carried out at 3:12 p.m. Poland's chest heaved several times during that time as the lethal dose of medications began flowing. He puffed out his cheeks twice before being declared dead at 3:14 p.m.

Nine months later, despite multiple appeals for clemency, partly due to Patrick Poland's allocution by, among others, A. Melvin McDonald, whose involvement had led to the brothers' being successfully sentenced to death, all petitions for clemency were denied. Patrick Poland was executed on March 15, 2000. He was one of three people executed in the United States on that specific day. The others were Darrell Keith Rich in California and Timothy Gribble in Texas.

During one of the clemency hearings, the relatives of Cecil Newkirk and Russel Dempsey, the two guards murdered during the robbery, were unforgiving. Newkirk's widow sent a letter to the clemency panel stating that Patrick Poland had to pay with his life. Camilla Strongin, a Department of Corrections spokeswoman, said Poland spent his final hours with a Catholic priest, receiving last rites about 2 1/2 hours before his execution.

Among the witnesses to the execution were the widow of one of the murdered guards, Lola Newkirk, relatives of the deceased, Patrick's girlfriend, Sherri Jo Christensen, and also A. Melvin McDonald, the Arizona state prosecutor who had initially ensured that the brothers would be sentenced to death, but tried to persuade the Arizona Board of Executive Clemency to commute Patrick's death sentence to life in prison yet failed. "I hope that his death will bring [the dead men's families] peace", said McDonald. He added, however, that "Mr. Poland paid for this crime each and every day for 23 years. I think he had genuine remorse. I felt justice was done in the execution of the first brother ... I felt mercy could have been done today by giving Patrick Poland life in prison."

Unlike his brother, Patrick asked for no last meal and used what time he had left to express regret for the suffering he and his brother had caused. His last words were, "If I may, once again, to the Newkirk and Dempsey families, please accept my apologies. I'm sincere. I'm sorry for the pain and suffering I have caused. I do thank you for your forgiveness. I ask my family to forgive me for the pain I have caused them. I ask all my friends and people who believed in me to please forgive me, and I ask the woman I love to remember I will always love her." The lethal injection procedure commenced at 3:03 p.m. As the lethal chemicals started flowing into his system, Poland's head jerked four times. His body shook slightly, his head rolled to the side, and his eyes shut. He was pronounced dead four minutes later, at 3:07 p.m.

== See also ==
- Capital punishment in Arizona
- Crime in Arizona
- List of people executed in Arizona
- List of people executed in the United States in 1999
- List of people executed in the United States in 2000
