= Aaron Gunches =

American murderer (1971–2025)

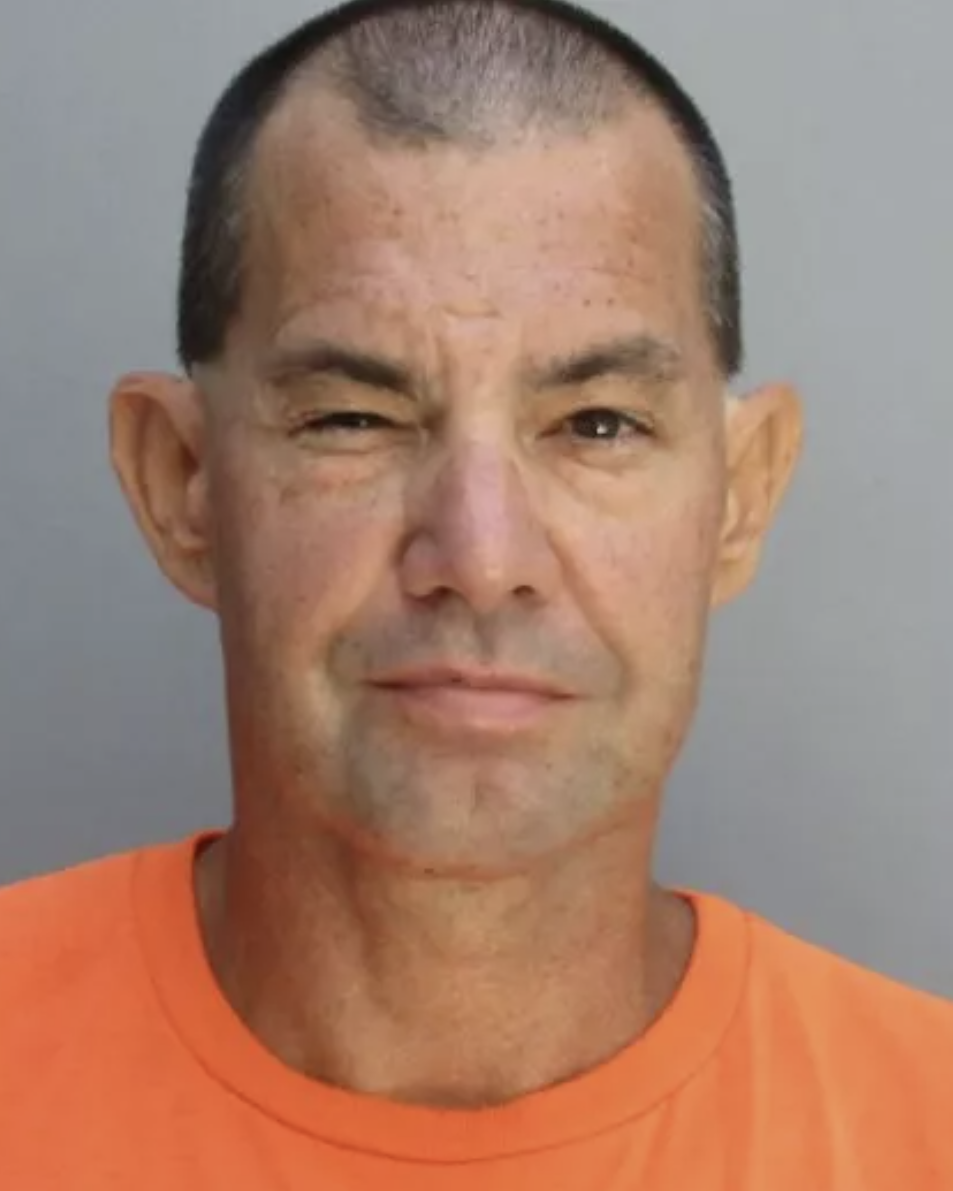
- ADCRR mugshot
- Born: June 30, 1971; Carlsbad, California, U.S.
- Died: March 19, 2025 (aged 53); Arizona State Prison, Arizona, U.S
- Status: Executed by lethal injection
- Convictions: First degree murder Kidnapping; Attempted murder
- Penalty: Death

Details
- Date: November 14, 2002 (murder); January 15, 2003 (attempted murder)
- Killed: Ted Price
- Injured: Robert Flannery
- Imprisoned at: Arizona State Prison Complex – Eyman

Aaron Brian Gunches (June 30, 1971 – March 19, 2025) was an American prisoner who was executed in Arizona after being convicted of the 2002 murder of Ted Price. Gunches attracted notoriety for repeatedly requesting his own execution and criticizing the state of Arizona for not carrying out his sentence. Gunches was the first person executed under a Democratic governor since the 2017 execution of William Morva in Virginia.

== Early life and crimes ==
Gunches was born in Carlsbad, California, on June 30, 1971. Little is known about his early life, except that he graduated from high school and worked in construction. He came to Arizona sometime in the 1990s and served prison time for weapons and drug charges, being released in 2001.

On November 14, 2002, Gunches went to the home of his girlfriend, Katherine Lecher, in Mesa, Arizona. Upon arrival, he discovered that she had been involved in an altercation with her ex-husband, Ted Price, who had come to visit her earlier that day. Price had been struck in the face with a telephone and he was on the floor in a daze. Gunches then had his girlfriend and her roommates help load Price into his car, with the supposed intention to drop him off at a bus station. However, Gunches soon realized he did not have the money to buy Price a bus ticket. Gunches and an acquaintance then drove Price out into the desert off the Beeline Highway. As Price got out of the car, Gunches shot him four times, killing him.

According to Price's sister, Lecher was addicted to meth and was living in squalor with the two children she had with Price. On the day of the murder, Price allegedly threatened to call child protective services on Lecher, accusing her of neglecting their children. In response, Lecher called Gunches, her drug dealer at the time, and asked him to "take care" of the situation.

On January 15, 2003, Arizona Department of Public Safety Officer Robert Flannery pulled over Gunches in his car during a routine traffic stop. Gunches then fired at Flannery and shot him twice. He then fled the scene. Flannery was injured in the shooting, but survived. After the shooting, a manhunt involving over fifty lawmen began. The day after the shooting, Gunches was found hiding in a haystack in Wenden and arrested. He was charged with two counts of attempted second-degree murder.

== Trial ==
In 2004, Gunches pleaded guilty to the murder of Ted Price. In 2008, Gunches was sentenced to death.

== Death warrant and execution ==
In November 2022, Gunches represented himself and asked the Arizona Supreme Court to issue his execution warrant so that justice could be served and the victims could get closure. Arizona Attorney General Mark Brnovich asked the Arizona Supreme Court to issue a warrant for Gunches's execution. In January 2023, Gunches withdrew his request, saying recent executions were "torture." Attorney General Kris Mayes took office and on January 20, 2023, newly elected Governor of Arizona Katie Hobbs ordered a review of the state's death penalty protocols. Mayes attempted to withdraw Brnovich's request for the warrant, but on March 2, 2023, the court issued the warrant for April 6, 2023, stating that it must issue the warrant after certain appellate proceedings were concluded.

Following the issuance, Governor Hobbs stated that the warrant authorized the execution of Gunches but did not require the state to carry out the execution. Karen Price, Ted Price's sister, then submitted a petition for special action asking the Arizona Supreme Court to direct Hobbs to carry out the warrant. Maricopa County Attorney Rachel Mitchell filed an amicus curiae brief supporting Karen Price's petition. Hobbs filed a motion stating the court should not consider Karen Price's motion because the state is not prepared to carry out an execution in a constitutionally sound manner and lacks correctional staff with proper expertise. Arizona Department of Corrections Director Ryan Thornell said he was "unable to find enough documentation to understand key elements of the execution process and instead has had to piece information together through conversations with employees present at past executions."

The Arizona Supreme Court denied the request to extend the warrant, and did not order the State to execute Gunches. The warrant expired in April 2023.

On June 5, 2024, another request for Gunches's execution warrant was filed by Mitchell on behalf of Maricopa County. Attorney General Mayes moved to strike the motion, arguing that only the attorney general could file such a request. Attorney General Mayes announced on November 26 that she would request another warrant for Gunches within two weeks.

=== 2025 death warrant ===
In early January 2025, Gunches again submitted a written request to be executed. He specifically requested the process be expedited to a mid-February execution date, and criticized the Arizona court system for dragging its feet in carrying out the execution. Gunches asked to skip the "legal formalities" of approving his execution. On January 10, the state attorney general filed a motion to seek an execution warrant, and on February 11, the Arizona Supreme Court issued the warrant, scheduling Gunches's execution date for March 19, 2025. After the warrant was issued, Gunches confirmed that he would not ask for a reprieve and that he still wanted his execution to proceed.

Following the execution of Jessie Hoffman Jr. on March 18, 2025, Aaron Gunches was one of four inmates scheduled to be executed over a three-day period, from March 18 to March 20, 2025. The other two were: Edward Thomas James of Florida (March 20, 2025), and Wendell Grissom of Oklahoma (March 20, 2025).

=== Execution ===
Gunches's execution took place on March 19, 2025, at the Florence State Prison. He was executed by lethal injection and was pronounced dead at 10:33 a.m. (MST). His last meal consisted of a double western burger, spicy gyros, onion rings and baklava. Gunches gave no final statement.

== See also ==
- Capital punishment in Arizona
- List of people executed in Arizona
- List of people executed in the United States in 2025
- Volunteer (capital punishment)

Executions carried out in Arizona
Preceded by Murray Hooper November 16, 2022	Aaron Gunches; March 19, 2025	Succeeded by Richard Djerf October 17, 2025
Executions carried out in the United States
Preceded by Jessie Hoffman Jr. – Louisiana March 18, 2025	Aaron Gunches – Arizona; March 19, 2025	Succeeded by Wendell Grissom – Oklahoma March 20, 2025
