= Murder of Zosha Pickett =

1986 murder and rape of a young girl in Arizona

Zosha Pickett
- Born: Zosha Lee Pickett; July 15, 1983; Arizona, U.S.
- Died: June 27, 1986 (aged 2); Tucson, Arizona, U.S.
- Cause of death: Fatal stab wound
- Known for: Child murder victim

On June 27, 1986, in Tucson, Arizona, two-year-old Zosha Lee Pickett (July 15, 1983 – June 27, 1986) was kidnapped from her home and she remained missing for four days before her body was found, and investigations showed that she had been raped and murdered by her abductor. The case remained unsolved for four years until 1990, when Daren Lee Bolton (September 27, 1966 – June 19, 1996), who was incarcerated for a sexual crime, was linked to the crime after authorities matched his fingerprints to the ones found at the crime scene. Bolton, who was also a suspect behind the 1982 rape-murder of Cathy Fritz, was charged with the murders of both Fritz and Pickett, but he was ultimately put on trial solely for the murder of Pickett, and he was sentenced to death and executed on June 19, 1996, after waiving his right to appeal against his death sentence.

== Disappearance and murder ==
On June 27, 1986, in Tucson, Arizona, two-year-old Zosha Lee Pickett was kidnapped from her home after a male intruder entered through the bedroom window to commit the abduction while the girl was sleeping.

Pickett's disappearance prompted the authorities and public to conduct widespread search efforts to locate the missing girl. A local motorcycle club put up a $1,000 reward (another source reported the amount as $2,000) for information to ascertain Pickett's whereabouts. The FBI was also summoned to provide assistance in investigating the girl's disappearance.

Four days after Pickett's disappearance, a girl's dead body was found in an abandoned taxicab, and her clothing was similar to the clothes last worn by Pickett before she went missing. Later investigations confirmed that the body belonged to Pickett.

When she was found, Pickett's clothes were intact over her chest wound, though her underwear was located in a different area of the vehicle, and this indicated that the killer may have took off the victim's shirt before he stabbed her, and later clothed her again. At the crime scene, the police found a pizza box, cigarette butts, and a semen-stained sock. They also found fingerprints on the window screen, as well as both the interior and exterior of the cab. However, the fingerprints did not match to the ones recorded in the local database, and the case remained unsolved for four years before the killer was finally caught.

== Capture of killer ==
=== Identification ===
Mugshot of Daren Lee Bolton

Four years after the murder of Zosha Pickett, in November 1990, the police reached a breakthrough in the investigations, matching the fingerprints found at the crime scene to a prisoner incarcerated in Arizona.

The prisoner was 24-year-old Daren Lee Bolton, a high school dropout who was serving a 15 3/4-year sentence for indecent exposure, kidnapping and sexual abuse after an incident where he exposed himself and fondled a woman. Prior to this, Bolton had served time in Arizona for theft in 1987 and possession of burglary tools in 1986. His first conviction was in 1985 when he was pleaded guilty to aggravated battery charges for sexually abusing a woman in Champaign, Illinois.

Back then when Bolton was arrested in 1984 for the battery charge, the Illinois authorities collected his fingerprints and entered it into a new computer system with new fingerprinting technology. The Arizona authorities managed to match the fingerprints to Bolton after they sent the samples to Illinois for testing, and therefore linked him to the murder of Pickett.

=== Link to second murder ===
Following his arrest for the murder of Pickett, Bolton was also linked to the 1982 murder of another young girl, seven-year-old Cathy Barbara Fritz. On October 2, 1982, in Tucson, Arizona, Fritz disappeared while walking home from a friend’s house next door. Her body was later discovered in the area, while an anti-violence demonstration was taking place nearby. Investigations showed that Fritz was sexually assaulted, beaten and stabbed by her killer, who was identified as Bolton eight years after her death.

Bolton was later identified as a suspect in Fritz’s murder after DNA testing reportedly linked biological evidence recovered from the victim to him. Investigators also determined that Bolton, who was 16 at the time, was a classmate of Fritz’s brother and had been at the family’s home shortly before her disappearance. These findings led investigators to conclude that Bolton may have abducted Fritz before raping and killing her.

== Trial ==
After his arrest, Daren Bolton was indicted in February 1991 for the murder of Zosha Pickett. Three years later, in 1995, Bolton was also indicted by a separate grand jury for the murder of Cathy Fritz.

Daren Bolton was put on trial for the murder of Pickett in November 1992. During the trial itself, Bolton took the stand and testified in his defence. He admitted that he had touched the taxicab, but he claimed that he was stealing mechanical parts from the taxicab two or three days prior to the killing. Bolton admitted he and an accomplice was present at the victim's house on the day of the murder, but he claimed he only went there to steal drugs before he was scared off by the dog. Bolton testified that after escaping the house, his accomplice returned there to abduct and kill the girl, and this prompted him to kill the accomplice in return, before he buried his accomplice's body in an unspecified location in the desert. However, Bolton's testimony attracted some skepticism and doubt.

On November 12, 1992, Bolton was found guilty of kidnapping, burglary, and first degree felony murder. A sentencing hearing was held in February 1993 for Bolton, who faced the possibility of the death penalty after being convicted of first-degree murder. Pickett's family members attended the hearing, where they delivered victim impact statements describing the effect of her death on their lives. Outside the courtroom, a petition supporting the death penalty for Bolton was also circulated nationwide and received signatures from people across the country.

On February 22, 1993, Bolton was sentenced to death by Pima County Superior Court Judge William Scholl. Besides the death sentence for first-degree murder, Bolton also received prison terms of 23 years for kidnapping and 20 years for burglary. Pickett's mother, who was present to hear the verdict, confronted Bolton during the hearing, stating that he had the opportunity to show mercy for her daughter but he chose to kill her, and stated that Bolton deserved the ultimate punishment for his crime.

This was the only murder trial Bolton would face. Although he was also charged with the murder of Cathy Fritz and was scheduled to stand trial in September 1996, his execution was carried out in June 1996, before he could be tried for Fritz's murder.

== Execution ==
On June 13, 1995, the Arizona Supreme Court dismissed Daren Bolton's direct appeal against his death sentence. After his appeal was unsuccessful, Bolton dismissed his attorneys and chose to represent himself. He later expressed a desire to waive his remaining appeals and volunteer for execution rather than spend the rest of his life in prison. Despite this decision, Bolton continued to maintain his innocence.

On May 16, 1996, the Arizona Supreme Court signed a death warrant for Bolton, and set an execution date of June 19, 1996.

During the final days before he was due to be executed, a clemency hearing was held by the state's clemency board to decide whether to grant him clemency or a temporary stay of execution. Bolton affirmed that he would want to be executed as soon as possible. On June 17, 1996, the Arizona Board of Executive Clemency unanimously refused to recommend a temporary reprieve or clemency to commute Bolton's death sentence to life imprisonment.

On June 19, 1996, 29-year-old Daren Lee Bolton was put to death by lethal injection at the Florence State Prison, and he was pronounced dead at 12:02am. Prior to his execution, Bolton aspent several of his last hours with his sister and two other family members. Bolton was the fifth prisoner to be executed in Arizona since executions resumed in 1992, following the state's reinstatement of capital punishment in 1976. Arizona's executions had resumed with the gas chamber execution of Donald Harding in 1992.

== See also ==
- Capital punishment in Arizona
- List of people executed in Arizona
- List of people executed in the United States in 1996
