= Richard Djerf =

Executed American mass murderer (1969–2025)

- Djerf's final mugshot, June 2025
- Born: November 6, 1969; Phoenix, Arizona, U.S.
- Died: October 17, 2025 (aged 55); Arizona State Prison Complex – Florence, Arizona, U.S.
- Status: Executed by lethal injection
- Conviction: First degree murder (4 counts)
- Penalty: Death (May 22, 1996)

Details
- Date: September 14, 1993
- Location: Arizona
- Killed: 4
- Weapons: Beretta pistol Knife; Aluminum baseball bat
- Date apprehended: September 18, 1993
- Imprisoned at: Tucson State Prison

Richard Kenneth Djerf (November 6, 1969 – October 17, 2025) was an American convicted of the mass murder of the Luna family on September 14, 1993. He was found guilty of four counts of first degree murder, sentenced to death on May 22, 1996, and executed on October 17, 2025.

== Background ==
Djerf was born in Phoenix, Arizona, on November 6, 1969. Before the murders, he had often been described as a loner. He stated that his motive for the murders he committed was revenge for an alleged home robbery of Djerf's residence committed by Albert Luna Jr., a former friend of his whom he had met when they were working as night custodians at a Safeway supermarket. In January 1993, Albert Luna Jr. stole several electronic items, among them a cassette player and an AK-47 rifle from Djerf's apartment. Originally, Djerf contacted police to report the robbery, but decided to commit personal revenge for the home invasion upon being frustrated by police inaction.

== Murders ==
On September 14, 1993, Djerf showed up at the Luna home with flowers and then forced himself in at gunpoint. Patricia Luna and her son Damien Luna were at home. Holding Damien hostage, Djerf then forced Patricia to load several items owned by the Luna household into his car. He then repeatedly asked Patricia whether she wanted her or Damien to die first, and also questioned her about the whereabouts of Albert Luna Sr. He then secured Mrs. Luna and her son by tying their arms and legs and gagging them. When their daughter Rochelle Luna arrived at around 3:00 PM, Djerf took her to her bedroom, where he gagged her with tissue paper and tape, raped and killed her by stabbing her in the throat. Djerf then returned downstairs and informed Patricia he had murdered her daughter.

When Albert Luna Sr. arrived home at around 4:00 PM, Djerf forced him into his bedroom at gunpoint. Djerf handcuffed Albert Sr. to a bed, smashed his head with a baseball bat, and then removed the handcuffs, believing Albert Sr. to be dead. Djerf then returned to the kitchen with Mrs. Luna and Damien. Mr. Luna regained consciousness and charged Djerf with a pocket knife, wounding him. Djerf stabbed Albert Sr. through the arm before reaching for his Beretta pistol and shooting Albert Sr. six times. He then asked Patricia "Do you want to watch your kid die, or do you want your kid to watch you die?", then shot Patricia and Damien in the head at close range.

Before he left, Djerf sprinkled gasoline on the bodies and around the house. He then turned on the stove and left a pizza box and a rag on the burner in an unsuccessful arson attempt. He drove away in the Luna family car, where he met with his girlfriend, claiming he had been robbed and stabbed by two men, going to the hospital for treatment.

=== Victims ===
- Rochelle Lynn Luna, 18
- Albert Beltran Luna Sr., 47
- Patricia (née Valdez) Luna, 42
- Damien Javier Luna, 5

== Investigation and arrest ==
Albert Luna Jr. did not arrive home until 11:45 PM the following day, at which point he immediately called the police.

Djerf confessed the Luna family murders in detail to his girlfriend on September 15, citing that it was "really awesome" and "you should've been there". In the following days, Djerf bragged about the murders to multiple other friends, eventually leading to a police report and subsequent arrest on September 18, at which point Phoenix police executed search warrants on Djerf's apartment, car, and motel room, finding multiple items stolen from the Luna household, along with the murder weapons.

On October 29, 1993, while being held without bond in confinement, Djerf tried committing suicide by slashing his wrists with a shank forged from electronic parts of a Halloween card he had received.

== Legal proceedings ==
Djerf admitted to the crimes and pled guilty to four charges of first-degree murder at trial on August 16, 1995, as part of a plea agreement, in exchange for a dismissal of all other charges. He later stated he hoped his plea deal would make him less likely to be sentenced to death, despite acting Judge Michael Ryan warning him that the death penalty would have still been a likely possibility. There were four death sentence rulings on May 22, 1996. Djerf scoffed at the multiple death sentences, saying, "They can only kill me once." The judge who sentenced Djerf to death in 1996 said that Djerf had "relished" the time he spent killing the Luna family to get revenge against his friend for burglarizing his apartment.

The Arizona Supreme Court rejected Djerf's appeal, and the U.S. Supreme Court refused to hear it. The Arizona Supreme Court issued a warrant of execution in February 2002. The U.S. District Court issued a stay one month later.

Djerf continued his appeals to the federal courts. Under Ring v. Arizona the Supreme Court ruled that only a jury, not a judge, could hand a death sentence. That put Djerf's case on permanent hold until the Supreme Court clarified its ruling in Schriro v. Summerlin. All three far-reaching cases—Ring, Summerlin, and Djerf—are Arizona capital murder cases.

In April 2017, the district court dismissed all of his claims, and Djerf appealed the dismissal. On July 24, 2019, the Ninth Circuit Court of Appeals affirmed the district court's dismissal. As of April 2021, Djerf was one of the 20 Arizona death row inmates who had exhausted all appeals at that time.

=== Legal significance ===
The case is significant for multiple reasons. First, under a rule 11 law, Djerf insisted on his right to fire his legal counsel and represent himself. Djerf had to fight for the right to legally represent himself in court so that he could forgo a trial and enter a guilty plea. His case is often cited as a self-representation case where it is not in the client's best interest to represent themselves as long as the person can prove competency.

== Execution ==
After the execution of Aaron Gunches on March 19, 2025, it had been speculated that Djerf was next in line for execution, although no motion seeking a death warrant had yet been filed. Those speculations proved correct when on May 22, 2025, 29 years to the day since Djerf was first sentenced to death, Arizona Attorney General Kris Mayes's office requested an execution date. It was initially expected that Djerf would receive his death warrant on August 19, 2025, for a requested execution date of October 9, 2025. However on August 19, the Arizona Supreme Court granted the warrant, scheduling Djerf to be executed by lethal injection on October 17, 2025, instead.

On September 18, Djerf wrote a handwritten letter to the media in which he apologized for the murders and stated that he would not seek clemency from the state for his upcoming execution.

Djerf was executed by lethal injection on October 17, 2025, the second inmate to be executed by Arizona in 2025. He was declared dead at 10:40 a.m. local time, and did not have any last words. His last meal was a double cheeseburger with lettuce and tomato, onion rings with ketchup, a piece of cherry pie with whipped cream and a Pepsi.

== See also ==
- List of people executed in Arizona
- List of people executed in the United States in 2025

Executions carried out in Arizona
Preceded by Aaron Gunches March 19, 2025	Richard Djerf; October 17, 2025	Succeeded by Leroy McGill May 20, 2026
Executions carried out in the United States
Preceded by Charles Ray Crawford – Mississippi October 15, 2025	Richard Djerf – Arizona; October 17, 2025	Succeeded by Anthony Todd Boyd – Alabama October 23, 2025
