= List of people executed in Arizona (pre-1972) =

The following is a list of people executed in the U.S. state of Arizona before 1972, when capital punishment was briefly abolished by the Supreme Court's ruling in Furman v. Georgia. For people executed after the restoration of capital punishment by the Supreme Court's ruling in Gregg v. Georgia (1976), see List of people executed in Arizona.

== Background ==
Historically, all executions in Arizona were carried out locally by hanging. In January 1910, an official execution chamber was completed at what was then the territorial prison in Florence, which went on to become the state prison in 1912. Capital punishment was briefly abolished in the state between December 8, 1916, to December 5, 1918. Hanging was later replaced by gas asphyxiation on October 28, 1933.

== List of executions ==
Name	Race	Age	Sex	Date of execution	County	Crime	Victim(s)	Governor
Jose Lopez	Hispanic	19	M	January 5, 1910	Pinal	Murder	Maria Espinosa, Hispanic	Richard Elihu Sloan (Note: Territory of Arizona before statehood.)
Cesario Sanchez	Hispanic	42	M	December 2, 1910	Coconino	Murder	Gregoria Conejo, Hispanic	Richard Elihu Sloan
Rafael Barela	Hispanic	30	M	December 2, 1910	Coconino	Murder	Gregoria Conejo, Hispanic	Richard Elihu Sloan
Domingo Franco	Hispanic	44	M	July 7, 1911	Santa Cruz	Murder	Mr. Amada, Hispanic	Richard Elihu Sloan
Alejandro Galles	Hispanic	35	M	July 28, 1911	Yavapai	Murder	Louis D. Yeager, white	Richard Elihu Sloan
Ramon Villalobo	Hispanic	28	M	December 10, 1915	Pinal	Murder	William Phineas Brown, 32, white (Ray deputy sheriff)	George W. P. Hunt
Francisco Rodriguez	Hispanic	29	M	May 19, 1916	Maricopa	Murder	Female, Hispanic (wife)	George W. P. Hunt
N. B. Chavez	Hispanic	35	M	June 9, 1916	Yavapai	Murder	Charles E. King, white (Jerome deputy sheriff)	George W. P. Hunt
Miguel Peralta	Hispanic	39	M	July 7, 1916	Yavapai	Murder	His estranged wife and her boyfriend, Hispanic	George W. P. Hunt
Simplicio Torrez	Hispanic	24	M	April 16, 1920	Coconino	Murder	Victor H. Mellick, white (Williams town constable)	Thomas Edward Campbell
Pedro Dominguez	Hispanic	27	M	January 14, 1921	Greenlee	Murder	Antonio Menchera, Hispanic	Thomas Edward Campbell
Nichan Martin	White	24	M	September 9, 1921	Yavapai	Murder	Arthur de Steunder, 21, white	Thomas Edward Campbell
Ricardo Lauterio	Hispanic	23	M	January 13, 1922	Maricopa	Murder	Adelina Sosa de Barillos, Hispanic (common-law wife)	Thomas Edward Campbell
Thomas Roman	Hispanic	32	M	January 13, 1922	Maricopa	Murder-Robbery	Thomas Hintze and Mr. Spangler (deputy constable), 10 (Hintze), white	Thomas Edward Campbell
Theodore West	White	35	M	September 29, 1922	Mohave	Murder	Lem Smith, white (Note: Previously murdered a man at a California mental institution with another inmate named Peoples; both were sentenced to life imprisonment but their convictions were later reversed on appeal.)	Thomas Edward Campbell
Paul V. Hadley	White	35	M	April 23, 1923	Pima	Murder-Robbery	Anna C. Johnson, white	George W. P. Hunt
Manuel Martinez	Hispanic	28	M	August 10, 1923	Santa Cruz	Murder-Robbery	J. Frank Pearson, white (Ruby postmaster)	George W. P. Hunt
William B. Ward	Black	38	M	June 20, 1924	Pinal	Murder	Ted Grosh, white	George W. P. Hunt
Sam Flowers	Black	36	M	January 9, 1925	Maricopa	Murder	Sabina Flowers, black (wife)	George W. P. Hunt
William Lawrence	White	26	M	January 8, 1926	Maricopa	Murder	Haze Burch, white (Phoenix police officer)	George W. P. Hunt
Charles J. Blackburn	White	36	M	May 20, 1927	Graham	Murder	Miguel Bernal, 31, Hispanic	George W. P. Hunt
B. W. L. Sam	Asian	27	M	June 22, 1928	Mohave	Murder	Tom King, Asian	George W. P. Hunt
Shew Chin	Asian	23	M	June 22, 1928	Mohave	Murder	Tom King, Asian	George W. P. Hunt
Jew Har	Asian	30	M	June 22, 1928	Mohave	Murder	Tom King, Asian	George W. P. Hunt
Gee King Long	Asian	30	M	June 22, 1928	Mohave	Murder	Tom King, Asian	George W. P. Hunt
Eva Dugan	White	51	F	February 21, 1930	Pima	Murder-Robbery	Andrew J. Mathis, 60, white (Note: Previously suspected of committing two other murders in Missouri and Nevada, but never charged as no bodies were found.)	George W. P. Hunt
Refugio Macias	Hispanic	43	M	March 7, 1930	Greenlee	Murder	Pedro Ornelas, Hispanic (Note: Also murdered Julian DeLuna.)	George W. P. Hunt
Herman Young	White	28	M	August 21, 1931	Pima	Murder-Robbery	John Dye, white	George W. P. Hunt
Fred Hernandez	Hispanic	19	M	July 6, 1934	Pinal	Murder-Robbery	Charles P. Washburn, 65, white	Benjamin Baker Moeur
Manuel Hernandez	Hispanic	18	M	July 6, 1934	Pinal	Murder-Robbery	Charles P. Washburn, 65, white	Benjamin Baker Moeur
George Shaughnessy	White	19	M	July 13, 1934	Santa Cruz	Murder-Robbery	Lon Blankenship, white	Benjamin Baker Moeur
Louis Sprague Douglas	White	47	M	August 31, 1934	Yuma	Murder-Robbery	John Hayden and Ralph Hart, both 63, white	Benjamin Baker Moeur
Jack Sullivan	White	23	M	May 15, 1936	Cochise	Murder	John B. Bradberry, white (railroad police officer)	Benjamin Baker Moeur
Frank Rascon	Hispanic	27	M	July 10, 1936	Maricopa	Murder	Joe Romero, Hispanic	Benjamin Baker Moeur
Roland H. Cochrane	White	28	M	October 2, 1936	Maricopa	Murder-Robbery	Richard Giles, white	Benjamin Baker Moeur
Frank Duarte	White	24	M	January 8, 1937	Pinal	Murder-Robbery	G. W. Johnson, white	Rawghlie Clement Stanford
Ernest Patten	Black	37	M	August 13, 1937	Apache	Murder	Female, black (common-law wife)	Rawghlie Clement Stanford
Burt Anderson	White	53	M	August 13, 1937	Yavapai	Murder	Cecil Kuykendall, 28, white	Rawghlie Clement Stanford
David Benjamin Knight	White	33	M	September 3, 1937	Maricopa	Murder	J. C. Kalb, white	Rawghlie Clement Stanford
Elvin Jack Odom	White	27	M	January 14, 1938	Maricopa	Murder-Robbery	Charles Goade, white	Rawghlie Clement Stanford
Archie Short	White	27	M	April 28, 1939	Pinal	Murder	Jack Hickox, white (Ray deputy sheriff)	Robert Taylor Jones
Frank Conner	Black	22	M	September 22, 1939	Santa Cruz	Murder-Robbery	Tracy Bird, white	Robert Taylor Jones
Robert Burgunder	White	23	M	August 9, 1940	Maricopa	Murder-Robbery	E. B. Peterson, white (Note: Also murdered Ellis M. Koury.)	Robert Taylor Jones
Grady B. Cole	Black	28	M	January 8, 1943	Cochise	Murder	Coy C. Qualls, white	Sidney Preston Osborn
Charles Sanders	Black	20	M	January 8, 1943	Cochise	Murder	Coy C. Qualls, white	Sidney Preston Osborn
J. C. Levice	Black	22	M	January 8, 1943	Cochise	Murder	Coy C. Qualls, white	Sidney Preston Osborn
James C. Rawlins	White	46	M	February 19, 1943	Greenlee	Murder-Rape	Marilyn Emma Atkins, 11, white	Sidney Preston Osborn
Elisandro Macias	Hispanic	20	M	April 27, 1943	Pima	Murder-Robbery	Aldo Hage, 60, white	Sidney Preston Osborn
John Earnest Ransom	Black	48	M	January 5, 1945	Maricopa	Murder	Charles H. Payne, 51, white	Sidney Preston Osborn
Lee Albert Smith	White	62	M	April 6, 1945	Cochise	Murder	Edward D. Miller, white	Sidney Preston Osborn
U. L. Holley	Black	38	M	April 13, 1945	Gila	Murder	Morgan Neilson and Ed Williams, 50 (Neilson), white	Sidney Preston Osborn
Angel B. Serna	Hispanic	27	M	July 29, 1950	Pinal	Murder	Catharine Gohn, white	Dan Edward Garvey
Harold Thomas Lantz	White	28	M	July 18, 1951	Cochise	Murder	Ada C. Park, 68, white	John Howard Pyle
Carl J. Folk	White	56	M	March 4, 1955	Navajo	Murder-Rape	Betty Allen, white	Ernest McFarland
Lester Edward Bartholomew	White	38	M	August 31, 1955	Maricopa	Murder	Pamela and Richard Bartholomew, 2 and 3, white (children) (Note: Also murdered his wife Marie.)	Ernest McFarland
Leonard Coey	White	58	M	May 22, 1957	Maricopa	Murder	Elnora Coey, white (wife)	Ernest McFarland
Arthur Thomas	Black	33	M	November 17, 1958	Cochise	Murder	Janie Miskovich, white	Ernest McFarland
Richard Lewis Jordan	White	28	M	November 22, 1958	Pima	Murder-Rape	Phyllis Mae Thompson, 22, white	Ernest McFarland
Vernice L. Craft	Black	41	M	March 7, 1959	Maricopa	Murder	Virginia Craft, black (wife)	Paul Fannin
Robert D. Fenton	White	25	M	March 11, 1960	Pima	Murder	Opal Keller Coward, 53, white	Paul Fannin
Honor Robinson	Black	44	M	October 31, 1961	Maricopa	Murder	William Bischoff, black	Paul Fannin
Patrick M. McGee	White	55	M	March 8, 1963	Coconino	Murder-Robbery	Ary J. Best, 66, white	Paul Fannin
Manuel E. Silva	Hispanic	43	M	March 14, 1963	Pinal	Murder	Beatriz Mankel, white (girlfriend)	Paul Fannin

== See also ==
- Capital punishment in Arizona
- Crime in Arizona
