= Meyers-Snyder murders =

1991 rapes and murders of two girls in Elfrida, Arizona

Mandy Meyers
- Yearbook photo of Mandy Meyers
- Born: March 20, 1978; Arizona, U.S.
- Died: July 8, 1991 (aged 13); Elfrida, Arizona, U.S.
- Cause of death: Strangulation
- Occupation: Student
- Known for: Victim of a rape-murder case

Mary Snyder
- Yearbook photo of Mary Snyder
- Born: January 20, 1978; Arizona, U.S.
- Died: July 8, 1991 (aged 13); Elfrida, Arizona, U.S.
- Cause of death: Strangulation
- Occupation: Student
- Known for: Victim of a rape-murder case

On July 8, 1991, in Elfrida, Arizona, two 13-year-old girls, Mandy Meyers (March 20, 1978 – July 8, 1991) and Mary Snyder (January 20, 1978 – July 8, 1991), were abducted from a Fourth of July weekend fair by 38-year-old Richard Dale Stokley (September 9, 1952 – December 5, 2012) and 19-year-old Randy Ellis Brazeal. The girls were taken to a remote area, where they were raped and murdered.

Both perpetrators were arrested, though only Stokley was convicted of two counts of first-degree murder. He was sentenced to death and executed by lethal injection on December 5, 2012. Brazeal pleaded guilty to two counts of second-degree murder as part of a plea agreement and was sentenced to 20 years in prison. He was released in 2011 after completing his sentence.

== Murders ==
On July 8, 1991, in Elfrida, Arizona, two 13-year-old girls, who were both friends, were abducted, raped and murdered by their two kidnappers.

On that day, both Mandy Meyers and Mary Snyder attended a community celebration fair for the Fourth of July weekend. Meyers and Snyder were never seen again after they told another friend that they were going to the restroom. The girls were, in truth, lured and kidnapped by two men, 38-year-old Richard Dale Stokley and 19-year-old Randy Ellis Brazeal. Stokley was working as a stuntman at the fair prior to the abductions while Brazeal himself was an ex-boyfriend of Meyers's older sister.

After abducting the girls, Brazeal and Stokley took them to a remote area, where they raped them. After the rapes, the men decided to kill both Meyers and Snyder, so as to silence them and avoid facing legal consequences for raping the girls. Meyers and Snyder were both stabbed and subsequently strangled to death by Stokley and Brazeal. The two men then dumped the girls' bodies in a partly flooded mine shaft.

A day after the murders, Brazeal surrendered himself and his car to police in Chandler, and Stokley was arrested in Benson. After their arrests, the duo were charged with the double murder, which brought shock to the small community in Elfrida. A small fundraising event was conducted and more than $5,200 were accumulated for the funeral funds of the murdered girls. A local elementary school was closed for six weeks in light of the murders, and counselling was provided to the local schoolchildren affected by the incident.

== Murder trial proceedings ==
Richard Dale Stokley

Randy Ellis Brazeal

Before the start of his trial, one of the perpetrators, Randy Brazeal, reached a plea agreement with prosecutors and admitted to two reduced charges of second-degree murder, and on November 12, 1991, Brazeal was sentenced to 20 years in prison without parole for each count, with both sentences to run concurrently.

It was revealed that the plea deal of Brazeal was reached at the time when the DNA testing had not been completed and the results were not released, and the prosecution feared that Brazeal would be acquitted and set free without conclusive DNA evidence to prove Brazeal guilty of the murders. After the conviction of Brazeal, the DNA results were released, and it showed that the DNA profiles of both Brazeal and Richard Stokley were found on the victims, proving that Brazeal also raped the girls like Stokley before killing them.

Richard Stokley, on the other hand, claimed trial before a jury at the Cochise County Superior Court on March 12, 1992, for the murders of Mandy Meyers and Mary Snyder. On March 27, 1992, Stokley was found guilty of both counts of first-degree murder. He was also convicted of two counts of kidnapping, and one count of sexual misconduct with a minor under the age of 15, but acquitted of the other three charges of sex with a minor. In response to the guilty verdict, the families of Meyers and Snyder reportedly applauded the judgement. Snyder's sister reportedly asked for Stokley to face the death penalty. The jury foreman also commented that Stokley deserved to be sentenced to death, although the sentencing was left to the judge to decide on a later date.

On July 14, 1992, Stokley was sentenced to death by Cochise County Superior Court Judge Matthew Borowiec.

== Execution of Richard Stokley ==
=== Appeals ===
On June 27, 1995, the Arizona Supreme Court rejected Richard Stokley's appeal against the death sentence.

On August 30, 2006, Stokley's appeal was dismissed in a federal court.

On March 17, 2009, District Judge Frank R. Zapata of the U.S. District Court for the District of Arizona rejected Stokley's appeal.

On September 26, 2011, the 9th U.S. Circuit Court of Appeals dismissed Stokley's appeal.

On October 1, 2012, Stokley's second appeal to the 9th U.S. Circuit Court of Appeals was denied.

=== Execution ===
By 2012, Stokley was nearing the end of his appellate process, and his execution was projected to happen that same year. Simultaneously, the state of Arizona was projected to carry out an estimated seven executions (including Stokley's), which would potentially made the state one of the busiest death penalty states in the United States.

On October 30, 2012, the Arizona Supreme Court signed the death warrant of Stokley, and his execution was scheduled to be carried out on December 5, 2012.

On November 16, 2012, the 9th U.S. Circuit Court of Appeals dismissed Stokley's appeal for a stay of execution.

As a final recourse to escape execution, Stokley appealed to the U.S. Supreme Court. His lawyers argued that Stokley's constitutional rights were violated because he was sentenced to death and would be executed while his accomplice, Randy Brazeal, was free after completing his 20-year jail term. In response, the prosecution argued that the disparity in sentence was due to the plea agreement Brazeal gotten in exchange for a lesser sentence and there were due consideration made over the mitigating and aggravating factors in Stokley's case before capital punishment was meted out. On December 4, 2012, the eve of Stokley's execution, the U.S. Supreme Court dismissed Stokley's appeal and allowed his execution to move forward.

On December 5, 2012, 60-year-old Richard Dale Stokley was put to death by lethal injection at the Florence State Prison. Before he received a single dose of pentobarbital, Stokley reportedly expressed some regret but he did not apologize to the victims and declined to make a final statement. Stokley was pronounced dead at 11:12am afterwards.

For his last meal, Stokley ordered a Porterhouse steak, french fries, okra, cauliflower, salad with blue cheese dressing, cheddar cheese, fruit (one banana, one apple, one peach), cream soda and chocolate ice cream.

In response to the execution, Mandy Meyers's mother stated that Stokley was a coward for not making an apology or faced the family members of his victims, and Mary Snyder's sister said that Mary did not get to grow up and learn to drive, go to high school and prom, and never become an aunt to her own children. In another interview featuring Stokley's execution, the families of Meyers and Snyder stated that it took a long time before justice could be served, and also criticized the fact that the other perpetrator, Randy Brazeal, was released from prison and did not receive the death penalty for his part in the double murder.

Cochise County Chief Deputy Rod Rothrock, who formerly investigated the murders of Snyder and Meyers, stated that Stokley deserved to be sentenced to death for the double murder. Arizona Attorney General Tom Horne described in his statement that justice was served for the victims' families after the execution of Stokley and hoped for the surviving kin of Snyder and Meyers to find some measure of peace.

== Randy Brazeal's release ==
Randy Brazeal, the other killer in the case, was released on July 2, 2011, after he completed his 20-year sentence. According to his lawyers, Brazeal, who was born and raised in Arkansas before he moved to Arizona a short while before the double murder, had since returned to Arkansas.

In 2014, Brazeal was arrested in Arkansas for urinating outside in public and for this offence, he was sentenced to 70 days in jail and a $700 fine.

== See also ==
- Capital punishment in Arizona
- List of people executed in Arizona
- List of people executed in the United States in 2012

Executions carried out in Arizona
Preceded by Daniel Wayne Cook August 8, 2012	Richard Dale Stokley; December 5, 2012	Succeeded by Edward Harold Schad Jr. October 9, 2013
Executions carried out in the United States
Preceded by George Ochoa – Oklahoma December 4, 2012	Richard Dale Stokley – Arizona; December 5, 2012	Succeeded by Manuel Pardo Jr. – Florida December 11, 2012
