= Execution of Jeffrey Landrigan =

2010 execution in Arizona

The execution of Jeffrey Timothy Landrigan (March 17, 1962 – October 26, 2010), who had been convicted of murder in the state of Arizona, was carried out on October 26, 2010, by lethal injection.

Jeffrey Landrigan

Landrigan was found guilty of murdering Chester Dean Dyer in 1989 during an armed burglary in Phoenix. At the time of the murder, he was a fugitive who had escaped from an Oklahoma prison, where he was serving a 20-year sentence for the 1982 murder of Greg Brown in Dewey, who was his best friend. Landrigan was initially convicted of first-degree murder and sentenced to life in that case, but his conviction was later overturned, and he pleaded guilty to second-degree murder.

The jury found him guilty of murder, and Landrigan himself prevented his defense attorney from presenting any mitigating evidence. The judge who sentenced him to death described Landrigan as "a person who has no scruples and no regard for human life and human beings".

One of the drugs used in executions in the United States was in short supply and had to be imported from abroad. Sodium thiopental is a barbiturate and the first of the three drugs used in the American lethal injection cocktail. Hospira has supplied thiopental within the United States, but could not supply Arizona with the dose for the October 2010 execution. The sodium thiopental used in Landrigan's execution may have come from the UK, prompting objections from British diplomats in December 2010.

In the European Union (EU), it is illegal to produce chemicals used in capital punishment. The EU did not initially specifically ban the exporting of sodium thiopental to non-EU members, as the drug has medicinal uses but, effective December 21, 2011, the EU extended trade restrictions.

Due to its use in executions in the United States, the UK, then still part of the EU, introduced a ban on the export of sodium thiopental in December 2010, after it was established that European supplies to the US were not being used for any other purpose. The restrictions were based on "the European Union Torture Regulation (including licensing of drugs used in execution by lethal injection)".

Landrigan was the 44th convicted murderer executed in the United States in 2010; the 1,232nd executed in the United States since 1976; the first murderer executed in Arizona in 2010, and the 24th murderer executed in Arizona since 1976.

Landrigan's biological father, Darrel Hill, was also a murderer, who had been sentenced to death in Arkansas. In February 1980, Hill shot and killed Arkansas Game and Fish Commission officer Donald Teague during a gas station robbery in Pencil Bluff. Landrigan's grandfather had been shot to death by police after a botched robbery, and his great-grandfather had been a notorious bootlegger.

== See also ==
- Execution of Clayton Lockett
- Execution of Dennis McGuire
- Execution of Joseph Wood
- List of people executed in Arizona
- List of people executed in the United States in 2010
