= Murder of Jennifer Wilson =

1988 murder and sexual assault of a young girl in Flagstaff, Arizona

Jennifer Wilson
- Born: Jennifer Marie Wilson; May 24, 1979; Arizona, U.S.
- Died: June 6, 1988 (aged 9); Flagstaff, Arizona, U.S.
- Cause of death: Blunt force trauma
- Education: Ronald Reagan School
- Occupation: Student
- Known for: Child murder victim

On June 6, 1988, in Flagstaff, Arizona, nine-year-old Jennifer Wilson (born May 24, 1979) disappeared after she was last seen riding her bicycle to a ranch, and investigators found that she had been kidnapped by a man named Richard Lynn Bible (January 23, 1962 – June 30, 2011), who raped and killed her after the abduction. Her body was found three weeks after her disappearance. Bible, who had been arrested for stealing a vehicle before he was linked to Wilson's death, was charged with first-degree murder, kidnapping, and child molestation. He was found guilty, sentenced to death and executed on June 30, 2011.

== Disappearance and murder ==
On June 6, 1988, nine-year-old Jennifer Marie Wilson, who was on a vacation with her family in Flagstaff, Arizona, was last seen riding her bicycle to a ranch where her family was vacationing, and her family had been driving alongside her bike during the journey. However, when the family reached the ranch, Wilson was missing. The family searched for Wilson, but they found only her bicycle abandoned at the side of the road, and Wilson's mother called the police.

A massive search was conducted with ground searchers and a helicopter, and road blocks were set up in the streets. The FBI was notified of the girl's disappearance. Wilson's family was set to make a public appeal to find the missing girl, and a reward of $26,000 was also offered for information that may help locate Wilson.

Police received information from Wilson’s mother, who reported that while traveling to the ranch, the family had seen two vehicles on the road. One of them, described as a "Blazer-type" vehicle, was speeding in the opposite direction around the time Wilson disappeared. According to the family, the driver was a dark-haired, dark-complected Caucasian man in his 20s who was wearing a white T-shirt. Later that day, police received a report from a man who alleged that his brother, Richard Lynn Bible, had been stealing from him. He told investigators that Bible drove a Blazer-type vehicle. Police recognized similarities between the description of Bible and his vehicle and the descriptions provided by Wilson's mother. This connection led investigators to identify Bible as a suspect in Wilson's disappearance.

On the night of Wilson's disappearance, the police managed to track down Bible and arrested him after a high-speed chase. The vehicle was found to be stolen from a police impound lot the night before Wilson went missing. Inside the vehicle, the police found a case of vodka with two bottles missing from the 20-pack case, rubber bands, a wrapped cigar broken in two places, a broken steering column missing one metal piece and several packets of Carnation "Rich" hot chocolate. While in custody, Bible denied any involvement behind the disappearance of Wilson, but he failed a polygraph test, was not ruled out as a suspect, and was still detained for auto theft. The search for Wilson continued even after Bible’s arrest, with hopes of finding the girl alive.

On June 25, 1988, 19 days after Wilson went missing, a group of hikers discovered Wilson’s unclothed body hidden under a tree, with her hands tied behind her back with a shoelace, and one of her sneakers, without a shoelace, was found near her body. A search around the area yielded several pieces of evidence consistent with items discovered inside the vehicle Bible was driving. Police found two vodka bottles, rubber bands, and cigars that had been broken in the same manner as those found inside the SUV. Investigators recovered a piece of metal that matched the missing component from the vehicle's steering column. These discoveries further implicated Bible as the alleged murderer of Wilson. An autopsy report certified that Wilson died of head wounds caused by blunt force trauma and she was being sexually assaulted before her death, and traces of pubic hair, which were later matched to Bible, were found on the victim.

Prior to Wilson's murder, Bible was convicted of kidnapping and raping his 17-year-old cousin, and sentenced to nine years in prison in 1981. At one point during his sentence, Bible told a fellow prisoner that he planned to kill the next person he raped, and during a session with a sex therapist, Bible reportedly made a similar threat and stated he would never make the same mistake again, which was interpreted to mean that he would leave his next rape victim alive. Bible was released from prison in May 1987, a year before he murdered Wilson. The area of the 1981 rape case was the same location where Bible raped and murdered Wilson after he kidnapped her, and Bible was reportedly familiar with the area itself.

== Investigations and charges ==
Before the authorities pressed formal charges against Bible for Wilson's murder, they sought to have DNA tests conducted on the evidence recovered, and requested the assistance of a laboratory from another state to do the tests. At that time, DNA analysis was a new technological investigation method deployed by the authorities in Arizona, and the testing results later matched the bloodstains found on Bible's shirt to the victim, and this marked the first time Arizona cracked a murder case using DNA analysis technology.

On August 4, 1988, a Coconino County grand jury indicted Bible on charges of first-degree murder, kidnapping and child molestation.

On August 15, 1988, Bible pleaded not guilty to the charges he faced for the murder of Wilson.

In October 1988, it was reported that Bible’s trial had been delayed until 1989 as both the defence and prosecution filed motions disputing the admissibility of DNA evidence in court. The parties also debated whether the child molestation charge should proceed and whether the case should instead be prosecuted by the Coconino County prosecutors. That same month, a trial judge ruled that Deputy State Attorney Fred Newton could still be put in charge of prosecuting Bible for the crime.

In February 1989, a trial judge ruled that the DNA evidence should be admitted in the murder trial.

In June 1989, Bible was sentenced to 62 years in prison for 32 unrelated charges, including three counts for attempting to escape from jail and 29 other offenses committed between November 1987 and May 1988.

In July 1989, Bible's trial remained pending before the Coconino County Superior Court.

== Trial ==
Richard Bible

In March 1990, Bible stood trial before a Coconino County jury for Wilson's murder. During the trial itself, the prosecution sought to prove that Bible was the killer based on the DNA test results that linked him to the crime. Dr. Thomas Vorphal, the medical examiner, came to court to present his autopsy findings: he testified that Wilson died as a result of three blows to the head, two of which were fatal, and she suffered numerous skull fractures and a broken jaw, which were likely caused by a large rock, and Wilson's body showed signs of molestation since it was naked at the time of the discovery and it was likely abandoned two to four weeks before it was discovered. The prosecution rested their case on March 29, 1990.

On April 4, 1990, the defense began to present their case, and also raised arguments to cast doubt over the reliability of the DNA evidence and testing in Bible's case. On April 11, 1990, the defense rested their case, in which they further argued that Bible should be found not guilty of the crime as the prosecution's case was built based on circumstantial evidence and none of them could directly implicate Bible as the killer.

On April 12, 1990, after about 4 1/2 hours of deliberation, the jury found Bible guilty of child molestation, kidnapping and first-degree murder, and the prosecution confirmed that they intended to seek the death penalty for the most serious charge of first-degree murder.

On June 14, 1990, Bible was sentenced to death by Judge Richard Mangum for the murder of Jennifer Wilson. Apart from the death sentence, Mangum also imposed 22 years each for the other two counts of child molestation and kidnapping.

== Appeals ==
On August 12, 1993, the Arizona Supreme Court dismissed Richard Bible's direct appeal against his death sentence and ruled that the DNA evidence was properly used in his trial against him. On April 18, 1994, the U.S. Supreme Court denied Bible's appeal.

On December 11, 1996, Bible filed an appeal for a new trial to the Coconino County Superior Court. On November 24, 1997, the Coconino County Superior Court turned down Bible's appeal for post-conviction relief.

On September 28, 1998, the Arizona Supreme Court rejected another appeal for Bible. A day later, the Arizona Supreme Court signed a death warrant for Bible and set an execution date of November 4, 1988. On November 3, 1988, the eve of Bible's scheduled execution, he was granted a stay of execution.

On July 26, and August 13, 2007, respectively, the U.S. District Court for the District of Arizona rejected Bible's appeals. On July 1, 2009, the 9th U.S. Circuit Court of Appeals dismissed Bible's appeal. On August 16, 2010, Bible's petition for post-conviction DNA tests was rejected by the Coconino County Superior Court.

On March 19, 2011, the Arizona Supreme Court denied Bible's request for DNA testing.

== Execution ==
On May 25, 2011, the Arizona Supreme Court signed a death warrant for Bible and issued an execution date of June 30, 2011.

On June 15, 2011, Bible's lawyers filed an appeal to the 9th U.S. Circuit Court of Appeals, requesting post-conviction DNA testing on hair fiber evidence.

On June 24, 2011, the Arizona Supreme Court dismissed Bible's appeal to stave off his scheduled execution. On June 25, 2011, Bible appealed to the 9th U.S. Circuit Court of Appeals and asked for a 30-day stay of his execution to allow his counsel to prepare their case.

On June 27, 2011, as a final recourse to avoid his execution, Bible petitioned to the state's parole board for clemency or a temporary reprieve.

On June 28, 2011, the Arizona Board of Executive Clemency declined to recommend a stay of execution or clemency to commute Bible's death sentence to life imprisonment. The five-member panel, in their unanimous decision to refuse clemency, described Bible as the "worst of the worst" offenders and affirmed the state's decision to execute him.

On June 29, 2011, the eve of Bible's scheduled execution, Bible's final appeal was denied by the U.S. Supreme Court.

On June 30, 2011, Bible was put to death by lethal injection at the Florence State Prison.

== Aftermath ==
Less than a month after the murder of their daughter, Wilson's parents set up a scholarship fund at Northern Arizona University to honor their late daughter, and stated that any donations they received would be transferred to the scholarship fund. They also joined in a campaign that advocated for victim's rights in October 1988.

In light of the horrific nature of Wilson's murder, there were public calls for the death penalty to be imposed for convicted child molesters. Several lawmakers debated the idea of capital punishment for child sex offenses, with some expressing support and others cautioning against such a measure.

Wilson's murder was the first homicide in Arizona to be solved using DNA analysis, leaving a significant impact on the state's investigative techniques. In May 1989, nearly a year after Wilson's murder, the Arizona Department of Public Safety (DPS) introduced DNA analysis technology and equipment to assist authorities in solving future homicide cases through DNA testing.

== See also ==
- Capital punishment in Arizona
- List of people executed in Arizona
- List of people executed in the United States in 2011

Executions carried out in Arizona
Preceded by Donald Edward Beaty May 25, 2011	Richard Lynn Bible; June 30, 2011	Succeeded by Thomas Paul West July 19, 2011
Executions carried out in the United States
Preceded by Roy Willard Blankenship – Georgia June 23, 2011	Richard Lynn Bible – Arizona; June 30, 2011	Succeeded by Humberto Leal Garcia Jr. – Texas July 7, 2011
