= List of people executed in Arizona =

The following is a list of people executed by the U.S. state of Arizona since capital punishment was resumed in the United States in 1976. A total of 43 people, all male, have been executed in Arizona. All of them were convicted of murder and were executed at the Florence State Prison in Florence, Arizona.

== List of people executed in Arizona since 1976 ==
No.	Name	Race	Age	Sex	Date of execution	County	Method	Victim(s)	Governor
1	Donald Eugene Harding	White	43	M	April 6, 1992	Pima	Gas chamber	6 murder victims (Note: The 6 victims were: Stanton Winston Blanton, Charles Dickerson, Gerald Huth, Allen Gage, Robert Wise, and Martin Concannon. Harding was executed for killing Gage, Wise, and Concannon, all of whom were killed in Arizona. Blanton was killed in Texas while Dickerson and Huth were killed in California.)	Fife Symington
2	John George Brewer	White	27	M	March 3, 1993	Coconino	Lethal injection	Rita Brier	Fife Symington
3	James Dean Clark	White	35	M	April 14, 1993	Cochise	Lethal injection	4 murder victims (Note: The 4 victims were: Charles Thumm, Mildred Thumm, Gerald McFerron, and George Martin.)	Fife Symington
4	Jimmie Wayne Jeffers	White	49	M	September 13, 1995	Maricopa	Lethal injection	Penelope Cheney	Fife Symington
5	Daren Lee Bolton	White	29	M	June 19, 1996	Pima	Lethal injection	Zosha Lee Pickett (Note: Also killed Cathy Barbara Fritz, but was executed for killing Pickett.)	Fife Symington
6	Luis Morine Mata	Hispanic	45	M	August 22, 1996	Maricopa	Lethal injection	Debra Lee Lopez	Fife Symington
7	Randy Greenawalt	White	47	M	January 23, 1997	Yuma	Lethal injection	8 murder victims (Note: The 8 victims were: Stanley Edward Sandage, Teresa-Jo Tyson, John Lyons, Donnelda Lyons, Christopher Lyons, Henry Weber, James Judge Jr., and Margene Judge. The first five victims were all killed in Arizona. Weber was killed in Arkansas, while the Judges were killed in Colorado. Greenawalt was executed for killing Tyson and the Lyons.)	Fife Symington
8	William Lyle Woratzeck	White	51	M	June 25, 1997	Pinal	Lethal injection	Linda Leslie	Fife Symington
9	Jose Jesus Ceja	Hispanic	42	M	January 21, 1998	Maricopa	Lethal injection	Linda Leon and Randy Leon	Jane Dee Hull
10	Jose Roberto Villafuerte	Hispanic	45	M	April 22, 1998	Maricopa	Lethal injection	Amelia Shoville	Jane Dee Hull
11	Arthur Martin Ross	White	43	M	April 29, 1998	Pima	Lethal injection	James Ruble	Jane Dee Hull
12	Douglas Edward Gretzler	White	47	M	June 3, 1998	Pima	Lethal injection	17 murder victims (Note: The 17 victims were: Steven Allan Loughran, Robert Robbins, Katherine Mestites, Gilbert Rodriguez Sierra, Michael Bruce Sandberg, Patricia May Sandberg, Kenneth Francis Unrein, Michael Raymond Adshade, Robert Allen Parkin, Lisa Diane Parkin, Walter George Parkin, Joanne Carol Parkin, Richard Allen Earl Sr., Wanda Jean Earl, Debra Jean Earl, Richard Allen Earl Jr., and Mark Allen Lang. The first six victims were all killed in Arizona while the rest were killed in California. Gretzler was executed for killing the Sandbergs.)	Jane Dee Hull
13	Jess James Gillies	White	38	M	January 13, 1999	Maricopa	Lethal injection	Suzanne Rossetti	Jane Dee Hull
14	Darrick Leonard Gerlaugh	Native American	38	M	February 3, 1999	Maricopa	Lethal injection	Scott Schwartz	Jane Dee Hull
15	Karl-Heinz LaGrand	White	35	M	February 24, 1999	Pima	Lethal injection	Kenneth Hartsock	Jane Dee Hull
16	Walter Bernhard LaGrand	White	37	M	March 3, 1999	Pima	Gas chamber	Kenneth Hartsock	Jane Dee Hull
17	Robert Wayne Vickers	White	41	M	May 5, 1999	Pinal	Lethal injection	Frank Ponciano and Wilmar Holsinger	Jane Dee Hull
18	Michael Kent Poland	White	59	M	June 16, 1999	Yavapai	Lethal injection	Cecil Newkirk and Russell Dempsey	Jane Dee Hull
19	Ignacio Alberto Ortiz	Hispanic	57	M	October 27, 1999	Pima	Lethal injection	Manuelita McCormack	Jane Dee Hull
20	Anthony Lee Chaney	White	45	M	February 16, 2000	Coconino	Lethal injection	Coconino County reserve deputy John B. Jamison	Jane Dee Hull
21	Patrick Gene Poland	White	50	M	March 15, 2000	Yavapai	Lethal injection	Cecil Newkirk and Russell Dempsey	Jane Dee Hull
22	Donald Jay Miller	White	36	M	November 8, 2000	Pima	Lethal injection	Jennifer Geuder	Jane Dee Hull
23	Robert Charles Comer	White	50	M	May 22, 2007	Maricopa	Lethal injection	Larry Pritchard	Janet Napolitano
24	Jeffrey Timothy Landrigan	Native American	50	M	October 26, 2010	Maricopa	Lethal injection	Chester Dean Dyer (Note: Also killed Greg Brown in Oklahoma, but was executed for killing Dyer.)	Jan Brewer
25	Eric John King	Black	47	M	March 29, 2011	Maricopa	Lethal injection	Ron Barman and Richard Butts	Jan Brewer
26	Donald Edward Beaty	White	56	M	May 25, 2011	Maricopa	Lethal injection	Christy Ann Fornoff	Jan Brewer
27	Richard Lynn Bible	White	49	M	June 30, 2011	Coconino	Lethal injection	Jennifer Wilson	Jan Brewer
28	Thomas Paul West	White	52	M	July 19, 2011	Pima	Lethal injection	Don Bortle	Jan Brewer
29	Robert Henry Moorman	White	63	M	February 29, 2012	Pinal	Lethal injection	Roberta Maude Moorman	Jan Brewer
30	Robert Charles Towery	White	47	M	March 8, 2012	Maricopa	Lethal injection	Mark Jones	Jan Brewer
31	Thomas Arnold Kemp	White	63	M	April 25, 2012	Pima	Lethal injection	Hector Juarez	Jan Brewer
32	Samuel Villegas Lopez	Hispanic	49	M	June 27, 2012	Maricopa	Lethal injection	Estafana Holmes	Jan Brewer
33	Daniel Wayne Cook	White	51	M	August 8, 2012	Mohave	Lethal injection	Carlos Cruz-Ramos and Kevin Swaney	Jan Brewer
34	Richard Dale Stokley	White	60	M	December 5, 2012	Cochise	Lethal injection	Mandy Meyers and Mary Snyder	Jan Brewer
35	Edward Harold Schad Jr.	White	71	M	October 9, 2013	Yavapai	Lethal injection	Lorimer Grove (Note: Also killed Clare Mortenson in Utah, but was executed for killing Grove.)	Jan Brewer
36	Robert Glen Jones Jr.	White	43	M	October 23, 2013	Pima	Lethal injection	6 murder victims (Note: The 6 victims were: Chip O'Dell, Tom Hardman, Maribeth Munn, Carol Noel, Judy Bell, and Arthur 'Taco' Bell.)	Jan Brewer
37	Joseph Rudolph Wood III	White	55	M	July 23, 2014	Pima	Lethal injection	Debbie Dietz and Eugene Dietz	Jan Brewer
38	Clarence Wayne Dixon	Native American	66	M	May 11, 2022	Maricopa	Lethal injection	Deana Lynne Bowdoin	Doug Ducey
39	Frank Jarvis Atwood	White	66	M	June 8, 2022	Pima	Lethal injection	Vicki Lynne Hoskinson	Doug Ducey
40	Murray Hooper	Black	76	M	November 16, 2022	Maricopa	Lethal injection	William Patrick Redmond and Helen Genevieve Phelps	Doug Ducey
41	Aaron Brian Gunches	White	53	M	March 19, 2025	Maricopa	Lethal injection	Ted Price	Katie Hobbs
42	Richard Kenneth Djerf	White	55	M	October 17, 2025	Maricopa	Lethal injection	4 murder victims (Note: The 4 victims were: Albert Luna, Patricia Luna, Rochelle Luna, and Damien Luna.)	Katie Hobbs
43	Leroy Dean McGill	White	63	M	May 20, 2026	Maricopa	Lethal injection	Charles Perez	Katie Hobbs

== Demographics ==
Race
White	33	77%
Hispanic	5	12%
Native American	3	7%
Black	2	5%
Age
20–29	2	5%
30–39	6	14%
40–49	15	35%
50–59	12	28%
60–69	6	14%
70–79	2	5%
Sex
Male	43	100%
Date of execution
1976–1979	0	0%
1980–1989	0	0%
1990–1999	19	44%
2000–2009	4	9%
2010–2019	14	33%
2020–2029	6	14%
Method
Lethal injection	41	95%
Gas chamber	2	5%
Governor (Party)
Raúl Héctor Castro (D)	0	0%
Wesley Bolin (D)	0	0%
Bruce Babbitt (D)	0	0%
Evan Mecham (R)	0	0%
Rose Mofford (D)	0	0%
Fife Symington (R)	8	19%
Jane Dee Hull (R)	14	33%
Janet Napolitano (D)	1	2%
Jan Brewer (R)	14	33%
Doug Ducey (R)	3	7%
Katie Hobbs (D)	3	7%
Total	43	100%

== See also ==
- Capital punishment in Arizona
- Capital punishment in the United States
- List of people executed in Arizona (pre-1972) – executions before Furman
