= Murder of Allison Feldman =

2015 murder of a woman in Scottsdale, Arizona

Allison Feldman
- Born: Allison Michelle Feldman; June 14, 1983; Minnesota, U.S.
- Died: February 17, 2015 (aged 31); Scottsdale, Arizona, U.S.
- Cause of death: Blunt force trauma
- Education: University of Arizona
- Occupation: Sales worker
- Known for: Murder victim

On February 18, 2015, 31-year-old Allison Michelle Feldman (born June 14, 1983) was found dead at her house in Scottsdale, Arizona, at least a day after she was killed. Feldman had been sexually assaulted and beaten to death, but her attacker remained unidentified until 2018. The perpetrator, Ian Mitcham, was identified via familial DNA testing and he was arrested and charged with burglary, rape and murder.

Eight years after his arrest, Mitcham was found guilty of first-degree murder in April 2026, and the prosecution sought the death penalty for the defendant. However, in May 2026, his sentencing trial ended in a mistrial, because the jury deadlocked on the death penalty. As of 2026, a date has not been set for Mitcham's second sentencing trial.

== Murder ==
On February 18, 2015, 31-year-old Allison Feldman was found dead in her home in Scottsdale, Arizona. Feldman's family had not received any calls from her since the previous day, and her phone was off. The family felt that something was amiss given that Feldman worked in sales and her phone was not supposed to be off.

Feldman's boyfriend headed to her house to check on her welfare, and he noticed that the door was locked. Feldman's boyfriend unlocked the door with a spare house key, and he detected a strong smell of bleach or chlorine inside the house. When Feldman's boyfriend reached the hallway, he discovered Feldman's body on the floor.

When Feldman's body was found, she was naked and her body showed signs of being badly beaten, strangled and sexually assaulted with a bottle, and an autopsy report later certified that Feldman died as a result of blunt force trauma to her head, combined with asphyxia caused by strangulation.

Feldman, who was born and raised in Minnesota, had relocated to Arizona during her college years, and she graduated from the University of Arizona after completing her degree in Spanish and communications. Feldman stayed in Arizona due to the state's warmer climate, and worked in sales for a Swedish medical-device company, where she received a positive performance review and was well-liked by her colleagues, friends and clients.

== Investigations ==
=== Early stages ===
Feldman's death was classified as murder and the police investigated the case after identifying her. The police deduced that Feldman was most likely killed while alone in her house on the night of February 17, 2015, after she returned home from a shopping trip at 9:00 pm, with the attack occurring sometime later. A neighbor later told the police that she heard a scream coming from Feldman's house at around 9:30 pm, and the police speculated that a struggle had taken place throughout her home, since there were many broken items and blood found in the pool and kitchen.

In April 2015, a $1,000 reward was offered for information to help solve the murder of Feldman, and the amount was increased to $10,000 by June 2015.

In February 2017, two years after the killing, the case remained unsolved, and the police investigation was ongoing.

In February 2018, the case remained unsolved and while they were still investigating it, the Scottsdale police cited it as one of the most difficult cases they had ever come across.

=== 2018 breakthrough and arrest ===
On April 10, 2018, authorities arrested 42-year-old Ian Mitcham, a resident of Phoenix, Arizona, after familial DNA testing linked him to the crime. Mitcham denied any involvement despite the DNA evidence. Familial DNA testing was a newly enacted investigative technique that was then used in only 12 states. The DNA profile recovered from the crime scene did not directly match anyone in the database but produced a familial match to Mitcham's 54-year-old brother Mark, who was serving a 40-year prison sentence for a sex offense committed in the 1990s. This development prompted investigators to examine his immediate family members as potential contributors to the DNA profile.

Mark's father had died by that time, while his two older brothers had no criminal records. Investigators focused on Mark's youngest brother Ian Mitcham, who had been arrested for several misdemeanors, including a 2015 DUI. Authorities had retained a blood sample from Mitcham's DUI arrest, and the sample was a perfect match to the DNA profile recovered in the Feldman case. The case was widely reported as the first murder in Arizona to be solved using familial DNA testing, a technique that had attracted significant attention for its role in identifying and arresting high-profile serial offenders, including the Golden State Killer and the Grim Sleeper in California.

== Charges and pre-trial motions ==
After his arrest, Ian Mitcham was charged with first-degree murder and second-degree burglary on April 11, 2018. His trial date was delayed until January 2022, and it was expected to be further delayed due to the ongoing COVID-19 pandemic in the United States.

On January 26, 2023, Maricopa County Superior Court Judge Roy C. Whitehead granted Mitcham's motion and barred the DNA evidence from being used at trial. He noted that when Mitcham was arrested for DUI in 2015, he signed a notice stating that his blood sample would be destroyed after 90 days if no further testing was requested. Instead, police retained the blood for several years and, after Mitcham became a suspect in Feldman’s murder, analyzed it for DNA without a search warrant. Judge Whitehead ruled that Mitcham’s consent to blood testing for alcohol or drugs did not extend to DNA analysis for an unrelated criminal investigation. He found that Mitcham had a reasonable expectation of privacy in his blood and that a warrant was therefore required. The judge also rejected the prosecution’s argument that the DNA would have been inevitably discovered through other lawful means, finding that the claim was speculative.

On June 13, 2023, the prosecution filed an appeal against Judge Whitehead's ruling and sought to re-admit the DNA testing results as evidence for Mitcham's trial.

On August 23, 2023, the Arizona Court of Appeals overturned the ruling of the Maricopa County Superior Court and again allowed the DNA test results to be admitted as evidence in the upcoming trial.

On September 26, 2024, Mitcham appealed to the Arizona Supreme Court to challenge the legality of the DNA testing and evidence obtained from him during the investigation of Feldman's murder.

On December 17, 2024, the Arizona Supreme Court ruled that in spite of the violation of Mitcham's constitutional rights by testing his DNA sample without a warrant, it did not discount the fact that the DNA evidence would have inevitably been obtained and used from an independent, untainted source by the authorities through lawful means, and in this aspect, it satisfied the legal exception of "inevitable discovery" from the requirement of a warrant in search and seizure law.

On April 28, 2025, the U.S. Supreme Court declined to hear Mitcham's petition regarding the DNA evidence in his case.

== Murder trial ==
=== Submissions and conviction ===
Mitcham's trial began with jury selection on October 20, 2025. A 12-member jury was assembled and opening statements were presented in court on November 12, 2025, with the prosecution arguing that Mitcham was the killer responsible for raping and murdering Feldman in her home in 2015. The trial lasted five months, and it was disrupted twice due to Thanksgiving and the year-end festive seasons before it resumed.

On April 6, 2026, closing submissions were made from both sides. The prosecution argued that the DNA evidence proved that Mitcham was the killer of the case and that he entered the house to kill and rape the victim, and also tried to wipe out the evidence by cleaning the body and house with bleach. The defense argued that the DNA evidence was not enough to illustrate that Mitcham was the perpetrator and further argued that the prosecution was seeking to convict an innocent man and that the investigators did not adequately investigate all leads or clues regarding the case, and therefore urged the jury to acquit Mitcham.

On April 9, 2026, 11 years after the murder, the jury found Mitcham guilty of first-degree murder, sexual assault and second-degree burglary.

=== First sentencing phase and mistrial ===
On April 15, 2026, Mitcham's sentencing trial began before the jury. On that same day, the jury found two aggravating factors existed in Mitcham's case: he was previously convicted of a serious offense and the murder was committed in a cruel manner. The aggravating factors made him eligible for the death penalty.

On May 21, 2026, the jury began to deliberate on sentence after the prosecution and defense completed their closing submissions on sentence.

On May 27, 2026, in midst of the deliberation, one of the jurors was removed from court because it came to light that she had shared information from her boyfriend about life in prison, and also made her individual research, which jurors are not supposed to do. An alternate juror filled the vacant spot and the jury continued deliberating on the sentence after being reassembled. In the end, the jury deadlocked on the death penalty for Mitcham, and as a result, the judge declared a mistrial, specifically for the penalty of Mitcham's murder conviction.

On May 28, 2026, a day after the mistrial order, Mitcham was sentenced for the lesser charges of burglary and sexual assault. Maricopa County Superior Court Judge Sunita A. Cairo sentenced Mitcham to 3 1/2 years' imprisonment for burglary and a consecutive term of seven years for sexual assault, and in total, Mitcham would serve a total of 10 1/2 years in prison, with a credit of 2,328 days served and he was also required to register as a sex offender.

=== Second sentencing phase ===
After the mistrial declaration, Mitcham's sentencing for the murder charge was put on hold, pending the prosecution's decision. The prosecution had the prerogative to either negotiate a plea deal with the defendant, which might remove the death penalty as an option, or to seek a re-sentencing trial before another jury to decide between life in prison or a death sentence. Under Arizona state law, if Mitcham's second sentencing trial ended with another hung jury, he would avoid the death penalty and instead receive a mandatory life sentence.

On June 18, 2026, Maricopa County Attorney Rachel Mitchell announced that her office would seek a second sentencing trial for Mitcham, and the prosecution would again seek the death penalty. As of 2026, there was no date scheduled for the new penalty phase.

== Aftermath ==
In August 2015, a woman's safety event titled Allison's Watch, which was named after Feldman, was held in remembrance of the victim, and offered safety tutorials, performances and guest speakers to advocate women's safety.

In November 2015, Feldman's family members, friends and neighbors, as well as members of the local community, gathered for a candlelight vigil outside Feldman's home to commemorate her.

On February 17, 2016, the first anniversary of Feldman's death, a public candlelight vigil was held outside the Scottsdale Justice Center in remembrance of the victim.

The Allison Feldman Memorial Scholarship was established in February 2018 by two of Feldman's friends and aimed to help students participate in UA Study Abroad programs. In February 2019, Feldman's family gathered at the University of Arizona, Feldman's alma mater, to organize a gathering to memorialize the victim, and a crowdfunding campaign was also carried out to continue the scholarship.

During the years after his daughter's murder, Feldman's father, Harley, became a board member of a non-profit group Parents of Murdered Children, which was aimed at helping the parents of murder victims in coping with the legal and emotional issues surrounding their loved ones' cases.

Feldman's father died on April 29, 2026, less than a month after Mitcham's conviction.

On the evening of October 2, 2026, ABC newsmagazine, '20/20', devoted a two-hour program to the Feldman murder case.
