= Execution of Joseph Wood =

Botched execution in Arizona (2014)

Joseph Wood
- Mugshot of Wood
- Born: Joseph Rudolph Wood III; December 6, 1958; Belton, Texas, U.S.
- Died: July 23, 2014 (aged 55); Florence State Prison, Florence, Arizona, U.S.
- Cause of death: Botched execution by lethal injection
- Convictions: First degree murder (2 counts); Aggravated assault (2 counts)
- Penalty: Death (July 2, 1991)

Details
- Victims: Debra Dietz, 29; Eugene Dietz, 55

Joseph Rudolph Wood III was an American convicted murderer executed on July 23, 2014, at Florence State Prison in Arizona, with a two-hour lethal injection procedure that was described as "botched". Wood gasped and snorted for an hour and fifty-seven minutes after the drugs were injected, and the entire procedure took almost two hours; experts said the execution should have taken about ten minutes.

== Background ==
Wood had been convicted of murder and assault after shooting dead his estranged girlfriend 29-year-old Debra Dietz and her father, 55-year-old Eugene Dietz, on August 7, 1989. Wood was convicted of two counts of first-degree murder and two counts of aggravated assault against a police officer. He was sentenced to death for each murder and received 15-year prison sentences, set to run concurrently, for the aggravated assault convictions.

Wood was scheduled to be executed with a combination of midazolam, a benzodiazepine, and hydromorphone, a morphinan opioid, a combination which had been used only once previously for the January 2014 execution of Dennis McGuire in Ohio. McGuire's execution had also been described as "botched" due to McGuire appearing to snort, gasp, and convulse during a procedure that lasted 25 minutes. From 1890 to 2010, the rate of botched (Note: Professor Austin Sarat of Amherst College defines a "botched" execution as one where "the executioners departed from official legal protocol or standard operating procedure".) lethal injections in the United States was 7.1%, higher than any other form of execution, with firing squads at 0%, the electric chair at 1.9%, hanging at 3.1%, and the gas chamber at 5.4%.

== Execution ==
The execution began at 1:52 p.m. MST and ended at 3:49 p.m. when Wood was pronounced dead. It involved injecting Wood with the drug cocktail of midazolam, a sedative, and hydromorphone, a semi-synthetic opioid, each at a dose such that a single application of both drugs was supposed to be sufficient to kill him. Wood had to be dosed 15 times, during which he gasped and snorted for well over one hour, a media witness comparing Wood's breathing to a "fish gulping for air". One Associated Press reporter said Wood gasped more than 600 times. Experts stated that the execution should have taken about ten minutes.

Witnesses speaking to ABC news stated "It seemed to go as normal. They put in the catheters. They announced that they—‌were administering the drug. And he closed his eyes and went to sleep. And about 11 minutes in, I noticed his lip quiver. And a minute later, he gasped. A few seconds later, he did it again and then again and again and again. It was loud. It wasn't just, you know, some nice, peaceful sleeping sound. Everybody was thinking something went wrong. You could see the looks on the faces of the people from the Department of Corrections, who were standing along the side. You know, they were looking at each other nervously."

Wood's lawyers filed an emergency appeal with the Supreme Court an hour into the procedure, requesting that the prolonged execution be halted. In the motion, they wrote: "He has been gasping and snorting for more than an hour [...] he is still alive." The appeal was denied by Justice Anthony Kennedy, with word coming half an hour after Wood's death.

After the execution, victim Debra Dietz's sister told the Associated Press: "What I saw today with him being executed, it is nothing compared to what happened on August 7, 1989," Jeanne Brown said, referring to Wood's murder of her father and sister on that date. "What's excruciating is seeing your father lying there in a pool of blood, seeing your sister lying in a pool of blood."

== Aftermath ==
Governor Jan Brewer ordered a review of the state's execution procedures, citing concern with the length of time it took Wood to die. Regarding the execution, Brewer said: "One thing is certain, however, inmate Wood died in a lawful manner and by eyewitness and medical accounts he did not suffer. This is in stark comparison to the gruesome, vicious suffering that he inflicted on his two victims – and the lifetime of suffering he has caused their family."

Charles Ryan, director of Arizona's department of corrections, said in a statement: "Once the inmate was sedated, other than sonorous respiration, or snoring, he did not grimace or make any further movement. Throughout this execution, I conferred and collaborated with our IV team members and was assured unequivocally that the inmate was comatose and never in pain or distress."

Stephanie Grisham, then a spokeswoman for the Arizona attorney general's office, who was also a witness, said: "There was no gasping of air. There was snoring. He just [lay] there. It was quite peaceful."

Dale Baich, Wood's public defender, decried the execution as a violation of the Constitution's prohibition of "cruel and unusual punishment", and said it could have been prevented.

On July 24, 2014, Arizona temporarily halted executions following the Wood case, pending a review of its procedures.

Executions did not resume in Arizona for eight years until May 11, 2022, when Clarence Dixon was executed for raping and murdering a 21-year-old woman.

== See also ==
- Capital punishment in Arizona
- Crime in Arizona
- Doyle Hamm
- Execution of Clayton Lockett
- Execution of Dennis McGuire
- List of botched executions
- List of people executed in Arizona
- List of people executed in the United States in 2014

== Notes ==
Executions carried out in Arizona
Preceded by Robert Glen Jones Jr. October 23, 2013	Joseph Rudolph Wood III; July 23, 2014	Succeeded by Clarence Dixon May 11, 2022
Executions carried out in the United States
Preceded by John Middleton – Missouri July 16, 2014	Joseph Rudolph Wood III – Arizona; July 23, 2014	Succeeded by Michael Worthington – Missouri August 6, 2014
