= 1996 Tucson murders =

Murders in Arizona, US

- Tucson police officers guard the perimeters firefighter's union hall after a shooting.
- Location: Tucson, Arizona, United States
- Date: May 30 – June 13, 1996
- Attack type: Armed robbery and murder by shooting
- Victims: 6 murdered, 1 injured
- Verdict: Guilty
- Convictions: First-degree murder Attempted murder Burglary (2 counts); Robbery (3 counts) (Note: Jones and Nordstrom were convicted of other crimes before and after the killing spree. These particular convictions are for the killing spree.)
- Sentence: Jones; Death; Nordstrom; Death
- Convicted: Robert Glen Jones Jr., 25; Scott Nordstrom, 27

Between May 30, 1996, and June 13, 1996, both Scott Douglas Nordstrom (born September 28, 1967) and Robert Glen Jones Jr. (December 25, 1969 – October 23, 2013) committed a series of robbery-murders in Tucson, Arizona. On May 30, 1996, both Nordstrom and Jones fired multiple shots at five men while robbing a smoke shop, resulting in two deaths and one wounded. On June 13, 1996, Jones and Nordstrom committed another robbery at a firefighters union hall, and together, both men murdered a female bartender and three customers during the robbery.

Both Nordstrom and Jones, the latter who killed a seventh victim in Phoenix in August 1996, were arrested and charged with all the murders in Tucson. Jones was found guilty of all the six Tucson murders and sentenced to death, as well as life imprisonment for the August 1996 murder of Richard Roels. Jones was ultimately executed by lethal injection on October 23, 2013. Nordstrom was similarly sentenced to death for his role in the Tucson murders and is currently on death row awaiting execution.

== Murders ==
=== Smoke shop robbery-murders ===
On May 30, 1996, two gunmen – 26-year-old Robert Glen Jones Jr. and 28-year-old Scott Douglas Nordstrom – barged into a local smoke shop in Tucson, Arizona, with Nordstrom's brother, David, acting as both a getaway driver and lookout.

Inside the store, Jones and Nordstrom followed the store's customer, 47-year-old Clarence Odell III (also known as Chip O'Dell), and Jones shot Odell once in the back of the head, before he and Nordstrom held the store's four employees – Noel Engels, Thomas Hardman, Steve Vetter, and Mark Naiman – at gunpoint. Jones demanded that one of the workers to open the register, but after the employee, Naiman, did so, Jones tried to execute the others, firing multiple shots at Engels and Vetter.

Naiman managed to escape the store during the shooting and went to call the police. As for the other three, Engels wouldn't cooperate and was shot at from less than two feet but Jones missed, while Hardman was shot in the head (with the bullet fired by Nordstrom) after coming out of the bathroom where he had barricaded himself and Vetter was shot in the face and arm while lying next to Engels. Hardman died on the scene while Vetter survived his wounds.

=== Firefighters Union Hall murders ===
On June 13, 1996, two weeks after the murders of Hardman and Odell, both Jones and Nordstrom committed another armed robbery at a local firefighters union hall in Tucson, and this time, the pair had murdered another four people.

At the club itself, there were four people present before the robbery, namely the 50-year-old bartender Carol Lynn Noel and three customers, 53-year-old Maribeth Munn and a couple: 54-year-old Arthur "Taco" Bell and 46-year-old Judy Bell. Jones and Nordstrom, who were armed with guns, entered the place and held all four hostage at gunpoint. After they took about $1,300 from the cash register, the two gunmen shot and killed all the four hostages. Noel was being assaulted before being shot twice, while the rest were ordered to rest their heads on the bar, before they were each shot in the head and died from the execution-style shootings.

Munn's partner Nathan Alicata discovered the bodies at 9.20pm, which therefore brought the murders into revelation. At the scene, the police recovered a total of three 9mm shell casings, two live 9mm shells, and two .380 shell casings.

=== Seventh murder and arrests ===
Although it was unrelated to the Tucson robbery-murders, Robert Jones Jr. committed a seventh murder, this time in Phoenix, Arizona, with another accomplice.

On August 23, 1996, Jones and his second accomplice Stephen Coats committed a robbery in the Phoenix home of a local resident named Richard Roels, a retired Arizona Republic executive. Roels was killed by a gunshot wound to his head, and both Coats and Jones stole his credit cards, which they used to buy pizzas and cowboy boots.

Ultimately, the police were able to track the stolen credit cards and its purchases to both Jones and Coats, who were found seeking shelter at a local motel after the murder of Roels. The police gave chase after the two men on a car chase until the pair accidentally crashed their car, and they were caught after attempting to flee on foot.

After the arrest of Jones for the killing of Roels, the police managed to link Jones to the six Tucson murders, after Nordstrom's brother David came forward with crucial information, confessing that he drove the get-away vehicle and that both Nordstrom and Jones were responsible for killing the six victims throughout the two-week robbery spree. The Nordstrom brothers were arrested in January 1997, about seven to eight months after the occurrence of the first two Tucson killings; Scott Nordstrom faced six counts of first-degree murder while David Nordstrom faced two counts of first-degree murder. Jones, who was already in custody for the murder of Roels, was first arraigned in court in June 1997 for additional charges of first-degree murder for the Tucson slayings, and on July 2, 1997, Jones was formally indicted by a Pima County grand jury for the Tucson killings. The Nordstrom brothers were indicted by another Pima County grand jury at a much earlier date in February 1997.

Eventually, in June 1997, the murder charges against David Nordstrom were dismissed, after he agreed to testify against his brother as a condition to plead guilty to an armed robbery charge, and the prosecution also settled on a five-year jail term for David Nordstrom.

== Trial proceedings ==
=== Scott Nordstrom ===
Scott Nordstrom

In October 1997, Scott Nordstrom was the first out of the two perpetrators to stand trial for the Tucson slayings, with jury selection slated to begin that same month. His brother David testified against him during the trial proceedings. Nordstrom, in his defense, claimed that he was innocent and framed by his brother, and put up an alibi defense, which was refuted by the prosecution.

On December 3, 1997, Nordstrom was found guilty of all six counts of first-degree murder, which made Nordstrom the first criminal in Pima County within the past 25 years to be convicted of six or more homicides.

On May 19, 1998, Judge Pro Tem Michael Cruikshank of the Pima County Superior Court sentenced 30-year-old Scott Nordstrom to six death sentences for all the Tucson killings, citing that the murders were "barbarous, arrogant and ruthless in the extreme."

=== Robert Jones Jr. ===
Robert Glen Jones Jr.

Robert Jones Jr. was the second of the killers to claim trial for his role in the murders, and his trial began on June 17, 1998.

On June 26, 1998, Jones was found guilty of all six counts of first-degree murder in relation to the Tucson slayings. Jones was additionally convicted of attempted first-degree murder, aggravated assault, armed robbery and burglary.

On December 7, 1998, Jones was sentenced to death for all six counts of first-degree murder he faced for the Tucson murders.

Apart from his six death sentences for the Tucson murders, Jones was tried in a second trial for the murder of Richard Roels. Jones pleaded guilty to this killing and hence sentenced to imprisonment for life without parole. Similarly, Stephen Coats was also convicted of the murder of Roels, and sentenced to life imprisonment.

== Execution of Robert Jones ==
=== Appeals ===
After the sentencing of Robert Jones to death row, an automatic appeal was filed to the Arizona Supreme Court against Jones's death sentences, but the appeal was dismissed on June 15, 2000.

On August 16, 2012, the 9th Circuit Court of Appeals rejected Jones's appeal.

=== Execution ===
About 15 years after he was sentenced to death, Jones received his death warrant in September 2013, and his execution was set to be carried out on October 23, 2013.

A last-minute appeal was lodged by Jones's lawyers, who all argued that the original prosecutor withheld evidence during Jones's trial and sought to stave off his execution. However, the appeal was rejected by the courts, including the 9th U.S. Circuit Court of Appeals on October 21, 2013.

On October 23, 2013, 43-year-old Robert Glen Jones Jr. was put to death by lethal injection at the Florence State Prison. His final words were, "Love and respect my friends and family, and hope my friends are never here."

Before his execution, Jones turned down the offer of a special last meal, stating that it was just another meal to him and found it nothing special on the date of his execution. However, he accepted the meal set on the prison menu of that day itself, which consisted of beef patties, mashed potatoes, gravy, carrots, two slices of wheat bread, glazed cake and a powdered-juice drink.

== Current status of Scott Nordstrom ==
=== Initial appeals and re-sentencing ===
On June 21, 2001, the Arizona Supreme Court rejected Scott Nordstrom's appeal against the death sentence.

In 2002, a ruling by the U.S. Supreme Court decreed that all death sentences should be issued by the juries and not judges. Due to this, the death sentences of Nordstrom were all vacated in favor of a re-sentencing trial.

On August 22, 2009, a jury was selected to preside Nordstrom's re-sentencing trial.

On August 27, 2009, the jury returned with their verdict, sentencing Nordstrom to death twice for the murders of Thomas Hard and Carol Noel.

On September 28, 2009, Nordstrom was sentenced to death via lethal injection by Pima County Judge Richard Nichols for the first-degree murders of Carol Noel and Thomas Hardman. For the other four Tucson killings, Nordstrom was also given four consecutive life sentences without the possibility of parole.

=== Subsequent appeals ===
On July 26, 2012, the Arizona Supreme Court dismissed Nordstrom's appeal against his second death sentence.

On January 22, 2013, the U.S. Supreme Court rejected Nordstrom's appeal.

Aside from his regular appeals, Nordstrom filed a lawsuit, and alleged that a jail officer read his letter without permission in May 2011, and hence argued that this violated his constitutional rights. Although a lower federal court rejected the motion, the 9th Circuit Court of Appeals later allowed Nordstrom's appeal in 2014 and stated that the Constitution did not allow prison officers to read outgoing letters between inmates and their lawyers. Three years later, the 9th Circuit Court of Appeals ruled in favor of Nordstrom in the lawsuit, stating that the Arizona Department of Corrections had violated the rights of Nordstrom by reading his letters, which breached his right to privacy and confidentiality when conveying sensitive and private information in his letters to his lawyers.

Also, Nordstrom was part of a separate lawsuit filed against the Arizona Department of Corrections, alleging that the mandated solitary confinement of death row inmates violated the constitutional rights of the inmates, including the right to due process and the prohibition of cruel and unusual punishment. A settlement was reached between Nordstrom and the prison department in March 2017, and the prison department also adjusted its measures, allowing death row inmates to no longer having to stay in solitary confinement and allowed to interact with the general prison population and take part in longer hours of recreational activities outside their respective prison cells.

On December 20, 2023, Nordstrom's appeal against his death sentence was rejected by U.S. Senior District Judge Raner Collins.

As of 2025, Nordstrom remains on death row at the Florence State Prison.

== See also ==
- Capital punishment in Arizona
- List of death row inmates in the United States § Arizona
- List of people executed in Arizona
- List of people executed in the United States in 2013

Executions carried out in Arizona
Preceded by Edward Harold Schad Jr. October 9, 2013	Robert Glen Jones Jr. October 23, 2013	Succeeded by Joseph Rudolph Wood III July 23, 2014
Executions carried out in the United States
Preceded by William Frederick Happ – Florida October 15, 2013	Robert Glen Jones Jr. – Arizona; October 23, 2013	Succeeded by Darius Mark Kimbrough – Florida November 12, 2013
