= Murder of Christy Fornoff =

1984 child murder and rape case in Tempe, Arizona

Christy Fornoff
- Born: Christy Ann Fornoff; May 4, 1971; Arizona, U.S.
- Died: May 9, 1984 (aged 13); Tempe, Arizona, U.S.
- Cause of death: Asphyxia by suffocation
- Education: Connolly Middle School
- Occupations: Newspaper carrier Student
- Known for: Murder and rape victim

On May 9, 1984, 13-year-old Christy Ann Fornoff (May 4, 1971 – May 9, 1984), a newspaper carrier, was kidnapped while she was collecting money during her newspaper-delivery run at an apartment complex in Tempe Arizona, and she was subsequently raped and murdered by her abductor, Donald Edward Beaty (February 7, 1955 – May 25, 2011). Beaty was later caught, charged and found guilty of raping and murdering Fornoff, and he was sentenced to death and executed on May 25, 2011.

== Murder ==
On May 9, 1984, 13-year-old Christy Ann Fornoff, a newspaper delivery carrier for the Phoenix Gazette, was last seen collecting money at a local apartment complex in Tempe, Arizona, and her mother waited outside for her to come out, but Fornoff did not return, and this prompted a search around the area, but there was no sign of Fornoff, and only her collection book was discovered by a fence near the complex. Fornoff was thus reported missing to the authorities.

In reality, Fornoff was being kidnapped by the apartment complex's custodian, Donald Edward Beaty, who forcibly took her into his apartment, where he raped and later murdered her by suffocating her. During the next two days after he killed the girl, Beaty pretended to help the girl's father to search for the victim, whose body he kept inside his apartment before he ultimately disposed of it.

Two days after the murder, Beaty, as part of his facade to cover up his involvement, contacted the police and lied that he discovered Fornoff's body wrapped in a white sheet near the trash container on the north side of the apartment complex. Despite his efforts, Beaty was ultimately suspected and arrested as the killer. The police searched his apartment and found some hair fibers belonging to Fornoff in the residence, and traces of vomit were found on a sheet, which were confirmed to belong to Fornoff. An autopsy later certified that the victim died as a result of asphyxia caused by smothering, and forensic tests also matched the blood, semen and hair on the girl's body to Beaty.

== Charges ==
Donald Edward Beaty

Two weeks after the killing, Donald Beaty was placed under arrest on May 21, 1984, as a suspect for the murder of Christy Fornoff. He was charged with robbery, sexual assault and first-degree murder the following day after his arrest.

On May 30, 1984, a Maricopa County grand jury formally indicted Beaty for both sexual assault and first-degree murder. A week later, Beaty pleaded not guilty to the murder and rape of Fornoff.

On August 26, 1984, Beaty's trial was delayed until September 26, 1984, after the judge ruled that the prosecution must make their evidence available to the defence.

On September 13, 1984, Beaty filed a motion to change the trial venue from Phoenix to Pima County and the prosecution siultaneously requested a gag order for people involved in the case. On October 3, 1984, the judge ruled that the trial should proceed as originally set in Phoenix, and thus denied the motion to change the trial location.

On October 25, 1984, Beaty's trial was again delayed by the judge after the defence submitted that the prosecution failed to submit key forensic evidence that they intended to use for Beaty's upcoming trial, which was postponed until November 21, 1984.

On November 20, 1984, Beaty sought another delay of his trial by 30 days to grant more time for the defence to prepare for his upcoming trial.

On January 8, 1985, Beaty once again petitioned for a postponement of his trial.

== Murder trials ==
=== First trial ===
The jury selection for Donald Beaty's trial concluded on January 29, 1985, with a 12-member jury and four alternate jurors selected to hear his case.

During the trial, the prosecution argued that Beaty was the one responsible for kidnapping, raping and killing Fornoff, and they pointed out that Beaty lied to the police by faking that he found the body while trying to throw trash in the dump area, when in reality, he had kept Fornoff inside the closet after the killing and disposed of the body, and a brown stain, likely Fornoff's vomit, was found inside the closet where she was kept. Maricopa County Medical Examiner Heinz Karnitschning, one of the prosecution's witnesses, testified that Fornoff died as a result of asphyxia caused by suffocation and smothering, and the victim had also put up little resistance against the defendant, due to the larger physical build of Beaty in comparison to the girl's small physique.

The prosecution completed and rested their case on March 5, 1985, after they summoned a total of 27 witnesses to testify in court. The trial of Beaty was set to conclude with closing arguments scheduled on March 13, 1985, and the jury began to deliberate the case on March 14, 1985.

On March 18, 1985, after three days of deliberation, the jury deadlocked on finding Beaty guilty of Fornoff's murder, and as a result, Maricopa County Superior Court Judge Rufus Coulter declared a mistrial in this case.

=== Second trial ===
After the mistrial declaration, Donald Beaty was set to be put on trial a second time for the murder of Christy Fornoff, and a new trial was scheduled for April 16, 1985.

The jury selection for Beaty's second murder trial was completed on May 9, 1985, and the opening statements of Beaty's trial was scheduled for May 13, 1985.

In midst of the trial, the prosecution attempted to summon a prison psychiatrist as a witness in Beaty's second trial because he reportedly heard Beaty admitting to the crime, and this was opposed by Beaty's lawyers, who appealed to the Arizona Court of Appeals to review the doctor-patient privilege between their client and the psychiatrist. Ultimately, the psychiatrist, Dr. George S. O'Connor, was allowed to testify in court, and on June 10, 1985, he revealed to the court that Beaty had confessed to him about killing the girl, but Beaty also claimed he never meant to cause Fornoff's death, and he only intended to muffle her to stop her from screaming. The prosecution rested their case on June 12, 1985, after O'Connor completed his testimony.

On June 20, 1985, the jury found Beaty guilty of sexual assault and first-degree murder on both counts, and his sentencing was scheduled for July 22, 1985.

On July 22, 1985, 30-year-old Donald Beaty was sentenced to death via the gas chamber by Judge Rufus Coulter, who described the murder of Fornoff as "especially cruel, heinous or depraved". Beaty was also sentenced to the maximum term of 28 years in prison for the other charge of sexual assault. In response to the death sentence, Fornoff's parents stated that it was a hard decision for them to seek the death penalty for their daughter's killer because they believed in life, and state prosecutor Gregg Thurston supported the death sentence, stating that he was pleased with the outcome and it was in the best interests of the community, claiming that Beaty could possibly kill again if he was ever released.

== Appeals ==
On November 1, 1988, Donald Beaty's appeal was dismissed by the Arizona Supreme Court.

In April 1992, Beaty's death warrant was authorized by the Arizona Supreme Court, scheduling his execution date as May 22, 1992, although the execution was later delayed due to legal reasons.

On September 24, 1992, the Arizona Supreme Court signed a new death warrant for Beaty, whose execution date was fixed for December 2, 1992, but it was unlikely to proceed because Beaty had not exhausted all his appeals at that point.

On August 27, 2002, the 9th U.S. Circuit Court of Appeals rejected Beaty's appeal.

On November 28, 2007, the 9th U.S. Circuit Court of Appeals dismissed Beaty's appeal.

On February 2, 2009, Beaty's petition for writ of habeas corpus was denied by the 9th U.S. Circuit Court of Appeals.

== Execution ==
=== Death warrant ===
In February 2011, the state filed a motion to the Arizona Supreme Court, seeking an execution date for Donald Beaty, after he exhausted all his appeals against the death sentence, and in response, Beaty opposed the scheduling of his death warrant, arguing that one of the drugs used for Arizona's three-drug lethal injection combination, a sedative called sodium thiopental, was illegally obtained and unregulated by the Food and Drug Administration. The state submitted that the drug was safe for use and that it was legally procured and imported from Great Britain.

On April 19, 2011, the Arizona Supreme Court approved the state's motion for a death warrant, and later that day, Beaty's execution was scheduled to be conducted a month later on May 25, 2011.

=== Final appeals ===
After his execution date was set, Beaty filed a final series of appeals to overturn his death sentence. On May 18, 2011, Judge Janet Barton heard the case at the Maricopa County Superior Court and dismissed Beaty's appeal and claims of ineffective court representation throughout the legal process.

On May 19, 2011, the Arizona Supreme Court turned down Beaty's appeal and found that the lower court was correct to dismiss his claims of ineffective counsel during his trial and post-conviction proceedings.

Beaty further took his case to the U.S. Supreme Court, where he argued that his execution should not be carried out because the death penalty constitutionally breached his rights to both religious freedom and exemption from cruel and unusual punishment. On May 23, 2011, the U.S. Supreme Court denied this particular appeal from Beaty, who simultaneously filed another appeal to the Arizona Supreme Court against his sentence on the grounds of ineffective trial counsel.

On May 24, 2011, the eve of Beaty's scheduled execution, the state announced that they would switch out sodium thiopental with another drug, pentobarbital, and deploy a new three-drug lethal injection combination to carry out Beaty's death sentence, after they acknowledged a confrimation from the U.S. Justice Department that they failed to fill up a form required for the importation of sodium thiopental from another country. On the night of May 24, 2011, the Arizona Supreme Court issued a temporary stay of execution for Beaty, and agreed to conduct a hearing to assess the defence's submissions, in which they argued for more adequate time to litigate a review of the state's switch to another drug combination to execute Beaty. The next day, on May 25, 2011, the Arizona Supreme Court lifted the temporary stay of execution and ruled by a majority ruling of 4–1 that Beaty would not be harmed by the change of drugs used for the execution.

Originally, Beaty's execution was slated to proceed at 7am on May 25, 2011, but due to the last-minute appeals he filed against his sentence, the execution procedure was delayed by several hours. On the afternoon of May 25, the U.S. Supreme Court denied another appeal from Beaty, who subsequently filed one more appeal to the 9th Circuit of Court Appeals, which similarly dismissed the motion, and his sentence was re-scheduled to be carried out on the night of May 25.

=== Lethal injection ===
On the evening of May 25, 2011, 56-year-old Donald Edward Beaty was put to death by lethal injection at the Florence State Prison. Before the drugs were administered, Beaty apologized to the family of Fornoff in his final statement, "I'm sorry. I'm sorry. God will let you see her again."

== Aftermath ==
In 1988, four years after the murder of Christy Fornoff, her mother began to organize grief support groups for the families of murder victims, and also rallied fund support groups to advocate for victims' rights. These efforts also contributed to the state passing a bill that emphasized victims' rights in Arizona.

The murder of Christy Fornoff was regarded as one of the most notorious crimes to happen in Phoenix, Arizona.

== See also ==
- Capital punishment in Arizona
- List of people executed in Arizona
- List of people executed in the United States in 2011
