= Donald Harding =

American murderer executed in Arizona (1949–1992)

- Born: Donald Eugene Harding; March 1, 1949; Goodrich, Arkansas, U.S.
- Died: April 6, 1992 (aged 43); Florence State Prison, Arizona, U.S.
- Resting place: Austin, Arkansas
- Other names: Ronald Gene Svetgoff; Donald Edward Harding
- Status: Executed by gas chamber
- Conviction: First degree murder (3 counts)
- Penalty: Death

Details
- Victims: 6–7+
- Span of crimes: December 1979 – January 1980
- Country: United States
- States: California, Arizona, Texas, and possibly Arkansas

Donald Eugene Harding (March 1, 1949 – April 6, 1992) was an American serial robber, spree killer, and possible serial killer who committed at least seven murders between December 1979 and January 1980 throughout California, Arizona, Texas, and possibly Arkansas. Harding was convicted of three murders, and he was executed in 1992 by gas chamber in the state of Arizona for two of the murders he committed there.

Harding became the first person to be executed in Arizona since 1976 when the death penalty was reinstated nationwide. Harding's execution was particularly noteworthy and controversial because his death in the gas chamber took eleven minutes and was reportedly gruesome. Harding's execution provided momentum for the movement to provide Arizona death row inmates with a choice between the gas chamber and lethal injection.

== Early life ==
Harding was born in his house in a small, rural Arkansas community called Goodrich, located within Augusta. By the time a physician arrived to assist with the birth, Harding was struggling for air; this resulted in Harding incurring organic brain syndrome. He also experienced neonatal jaundice. Harding's father was an alcoholic who abandoned Harding, his older brother Darryl, and their mother Maycle. When Harding was a toddler, he was admitted to the Child Guidance Clinic in Little Rock, Arkansas, where a doctor treating him wrote in a report that his mother was "very immature and narcissistic" and unfit to care for her sons. When Harding's mother remarried to a man named Fred Brown who contracted tuberculosis, the family relocated to a sanatorium, where Harding alleged nurses and staff regularly beat and mistreated him. One specific allegation involved a nurse dunking Harding's face in a toilet after he wet his bed.

The family stayed at the sanatorium for approximately two years before leaving, after which Harding moved repeatedly between living with his mother and his grandparents. Ultimately, he settled with his mother in an impoverished area of North Little Rock. Harding witnessed Brown beating his mother; while he was in school, he struggled with behavioral issues, including defiance and truancy. A doctor reported in February 1960, shortly before Harding turned 11, that Harding displayed suicidal tendencies when he was nine years old, slashing his wrists and leaving a suicide note in which he threatened to "jump in a river." That same doctor noted while Harding's brother Darryl displayed none of the problematic behaviors Harding did, Donald Harding had "expressed the desire to kill and choke people. . . . It is amazing the degree of psychopathy contained in a boy of this young age." The doctor attributed Harding's behavioral issues to his brain damage, which his mother also claimed was exacerbated by Harding falling from a crib and being struck by a swing set during his childhood. In his preteen and teenage years, Harding underwent three EEGs, the last one being in 1968. The tests confirmed Harding had organic brain damage and experienced epileptic seizures.

== Pre-Arizona criminal history and murders ==
Harding's first arrest occurred when he was 11 years old, when he was arrested for joyriding. He was sent to the Arkansas Boys' Industrial School, and he spent four years cycling between that facility, his home, and the Arkansas State Hospital before his first long-term imprisonment. On December 4, 1964, when he was 15 years old, Harding was convicted of four counts of burglary and three counts of grand larceny. Although the sentence was initially suspended, and Harding was initially sent back to the Boys' Industrial School, Harding escaped the facility and carried out a burglary in Texarkana, Arkansas. Because of the escape, a judge revoked the suspension of Harding's sentence, and he was placed in an adult maximum security prison, the Tucker Unit, to serve a 15-year sentence in June 1965. While in the Tucker Unit, in 1970, he was convicted of attempting to escape from custody. During Harding's stay on death row, his attorneys would attribute further behavioral and developmental issues to Harding's time in an adult prison as a teenager. While in prison, Harding attempted suicide again.

Harding was released from custody for these charges in 1973. Soon after his release, Harding was convicted in federal court for "conspiracy to commit offense or defraud United States" and was imprisoned again for five years. Harding was paroled from prison a second time in March 1979. Two months later, he was arrested in Pulaski County, Arkansas, and charged with a stabbing murder.

Harding was in jail in Pulaski County when he and five other inmates orchestrated an escape from the county jail on September 17, 1979. Harding spent the rest of 1979 and part of 1980 carrying out a multi-state crime spree until his final apprehension in Arizona. Harding's crime spree began with the attempted robbery of a prostitute in Chicago, Illinois, on September 27; on December 10, he robbed and murdered 27-year-old Stanton Winston Blanton in Blanton's apartment in Dallas, Texas, although he was never charged with this murder. On December 18, he robbed a man named Ronald Svetgoff and stole his car and identification cards, the latter of which he would use to feign his identity when he relocated to Arizona. Harding took multiple individuals and families hostage throughout Texas, Utah, and California throughout the rest of December 1979.

On January 3, 1980, Harding drove a stolen car to South Lake Tahoe, California, where he broke into the hotel room belonging to 35-year-old Charles Dickerson; Harding robbed Dickerson and left him bound and gagged. By the time a hotel maid discovered Dickerson, the gag Harding placed in Dickerson's mouth had caused Dickerson to suffocate to death. Harding remained in California, robbing and carjacking multiple individuals and couples. On January 10, 1980, a car he stole from Joseph Wohlers broke down on U.S. Highway 101; when 39-year-old Gerald O. Huth, a Sperry Univac employee and native of Bloomington, Minnesota, stopped to help Harding, Harding shot Huth to death and stole Huth's car. Huth's murder was not immediately discovered, and weeks following the murder, authorities still had not found his body, although by late January, a farmer had discovered Huth's body in a field near Paso Robles, California; he was found with his hands tied behind his back and a gunshot wound in his head. While still in California, Harding used Huth's stolen identification to conceal his identity, and he used Huth's credit cards to rent a hotel room in San Diego, California. Later, while still in San Diego, Harding robbed four people in an optometrist's office and ordered one of the robbery victims to drive him to an unknown woman's house.

== Arizona murders ==
On January 24, 1980, Harding fled to Phoenix, Arizona, where he gained entry to a hotel room belonging to 38-year-old gastroenterologist Allen F. Gage. Harding bound Gage's wrists and ankles and gagged him with a sock before robbing him. Like Dickerson, Gage suffocated to death on the gag placed in his mouth.

On January 25, 1980, Donald Harding posed as a security guard to gain entry into a motel room in Tucson, Arizona, where Robert A. Wise, a 35-year-old businessman, was meeting with Martin Concannon, 33, his corporation's sales representative. Upon entering the hotel room, Harding hogtied the two men, beat Wise with a wooden motel lamp, and stuffed socks into Concannon's mouth; afterwards, he shot both men. Once both men were critically injured, Harding stole Wise's briefcase, which contained his credit cards; he then took Concannon's Oldsmobile. The next morning, police in Tucson discovered the bodies. Wise's body was on the floor next to the bed, tied to the bedpost by a restraint wrapped around his neck with his hands and ankles bound together. He had missing teeth and jaw fractures from when Harding had bludgeoned him with the lamp, and Harding had shot him point-blank with a .25 caliber pistol once in the chest and once in the left temple. Medical examiners attributed his cause of death to the first bullet causing perforation of his spinal cord. Authorities found Concannon's body in the hotel room's bathroom. He had also been shot in the chest and temple, and the bullet wound had also perforated his spinal cord, but Concannon's death was not instantaneous like Wise's death was; rather, similarly to Dickerson and Gage, medical examiners attributed his cause of death to the socks pushed to the back of his throat and obstructing his breathing passage, thereby suffocating him.

After going through Robert Wise's belongings, Harding found the victim's home address. He drove the stolen car to Wise's home, where he encountered Wise's wife, supposedly with the intention of murdering her and Wise's children. Wise, Wise's family, Concannon, and Gage were all strangers to Harding. Harding had one of Wise's business cards and pretended to know Wise, and after he identified himself under pretenses, he asked Wise's wife if "Bob Wise" was home. Wise's wife told Harding Wise was not home, but that she was expecting him to be home shortly and he was late. Harding then left. Later, during Harding's trial for Wise's murder, his wife testified she believed Harding may have left her home so quickly because he was afraid of their family dog.

== Apprehension ==
After the encounter with Robert Wise's wife, Harding drove the stolen car to a reserved parking lot on the campus of Northern Arizona University in Flagstaff. The campus policeman who was monitoring the lot told Harding to park elsewhere; when he and Harding spoke, he noticed Harding had a southern accent in spite of his car sporting Ohio license plates. The policeman called his police dispatcher and asked him to check the license number. While Harding drove away from the parking lot, the dispatcher returned with information about the car having been stolen and possibly involved in two homicides. The campus police officer then followed Harding, arrested him, and searched him, finding a .25 caliber pistol in one of his pockets, an identification card reading "Security Guard", another identification card reading "Special Officer", a Texas driver's license issued to a man named Ronald Gene Svetgoff, and an Oklahoma driver's license issued to the same man. Harding claimed he was Svetgoff, but police took him into custody anyway, where they eventually discovered his real identity.

At the time of his capture, the FBI office in Flagstaff announced Harding was wanted for investigation in connection with a total of five murders, six kidnappings, 12 armed robberies, and four carjackings across Arizona, California, Nevada, Oklahoma, Utah, Tennessee, and Texas. By the time he was convicted of the murders that would result in him receiving the death penalty, Harding would be a prime suspect in a total of over 40 armed robberies and kidnappings, as well as seven murders. Harding was subsequently charged with the murders of Robert Wise and Martin Concannon, and he was booked into the jail in Coconino County, Arizona. When asked why he murdered some of his victims and not others, Harding replied, "Judgment calls."

== Trials ==
While Harding awaited his trial for the two murders, he remained in custody. In October 1980, Harding assaulted a fellow jail inmate, leading to him being charged with dangerous or deadly assault by a prisoner. Harding chose to serve as his own counsel in this trial; a court also appointed a public defender to help Harding. Before the assault trial began, Harding threatened to harm his public defender and issued general threats towards other participants in the trial. Due to these threats, Harding was required to be restrained in leg irons during his trial. He was convicted of the assault on July 30, 1981, after which he was sentenced to life imprisonment without the possibility of parole for 25 years. Sometime later, Harding was transferred to the Pima County Jail, where, in February, he attacked two guards. He attempted to stab one guard, while the other prevented him from doing so.

Harding's trial for the murders began on April 21, 1982. During Harding's trial, deputy sheriffs cordoned off the first two rows of the courtroom's viewing gallery to prevent Harding from being able to take a hostage. One deputy reported that Harding had told him he was going to do something to prompt police to shoot him because he did not want to go to prison again. His defense attorney used the evidence of Harding's organic brain damage to build an argument that Harding could not prevent himself from acting on his "violent impulses" and was therefore not criminally responsible for his actions. Prosecutors countered by arguing that Harding's crimes were well planned and not impulsive. Although Harding primarily acted as his own attorney during his murder trial as well, with some assistance from a court-appointed public defender, he spent most of the trial seated with his eyes concealed by sunglasses, refusing to cross-examine witnesses or present a defense. After the prosecution and defense rested their cases, the jury deliberated for five hours before returning with their verdict on April 27, at 4:15 PM. Harding was found guilty of two counts of first-degree murder for the killings of Robert Wise and Martin Concannon, as well as the armed robberies and kidnappings of both men and the theft of Concannon's car.

On May 26, 1982, Harding's sentencing hearing took place. The trial court permitted Harding to present mitigating circumstances to argue against the imposition of the death penalty in his case and also offered him additional time to form his case, but Harding declined both the offer to present mitigating circumstances and the offer for extra time. The prosecution found four aggravating circumstances, including his prior conviction for the life-threatening assault he had committed while in custody; the fact that he committed the murders for pecuniary gain; and the fact that the murders were committed in "an especially cruel, heinous, or depraved manner." Harding was formally sentenced to death for the two murders, and he also received two consecutive 21-year sentences for the robberies and two more consecutive five-year sentences for the theft of Concannon's car. Later, Harding received a third death sentence for the murder of Allen Gage, although this third sentence was imposed separately from the murders for Concannon and Wise. Harding was specifically executed after exhausting his appeals for the double murder.

== Execution ==
Harding remained on death row in Arizona for almost ten years. During that time, he filed a total of three appeals, all of which saw his murder convictions and death sentences upheld.

At Harding's hearing before the Arizona Board of Pardons and Paroles, his defense attorneys repeated the arguments they used in Harding's trial regarding his organic brain damage. The board ultimately refused to recommend that then-Governor Fife Symington grant mercy in the form of a reprieve or commutation to life imprisonment.

Before Harding's execution, around 150 people staged an anti-death penalty protest outside of the Florence State Prison walls. Harding's execution was scheduled to take place shortly after midnight on April 6, 1992. Martin Concannon's widow elected not to view the execution, but Warden Roger Crist, then-Attorney General Grant Woods, Harding's religious advisor, and six reporters were witnesses. Harding ate a last meal consisting of fried eggs, several strips of bacon, toast with butter and honey, and orange juice.

At approximately 12:05 a.m., Harding was led into the gas chamber. When the chamber was sealed, a curtain was lifted to allow witnesses to look at Harding; Attorney General Woods claimed Harding then looked at him and began yelling obscenities through the glass. Reporters claimed Harding also made obscene gestures with his middle finger towards Attorney General Woods as the gas spread in the chamber.

Harding's attorney described the execution as "slow, painful, degrading, and inhumane," claiming Harding convulsed violently and repeatedly gasped for breath while his body shuddered with spasms for several minutes until he became still. Harding was pronounced dead ten minutes and 31 seconds after the hydrocyanic gas was released into the chamber. Harding was the first person executed in Arizona after the death penalty moratorium imposed by the 1972 Furman v. Georgia ruling was lifted, and he was the first in the state since the 1963 gas chamber execution of Manuel Silvas.

== Aftermath ==
Harding's execution generated controversy over the nature and duration of his death; the controversy provided momentum for state legislators to replace the gas chamber with lethal injection. Arizona State Representative Lela Steffey had proposed the change from the gas chamber earlier in 1992 due to concerns about air pollution involved in venting lethal gas after an execution, and Steffey stated polls showed a majority of Arizonans supported the switch to lethal injection; however, the movement did not gain momentum until after Harding's execution. Further propelling this move to change execution methods was the controversial and lengthy gas chamber execution of Robert Alton Harris in California on April 21, 1992. On April 25, the Arizona State House of Representatives passed a bill 41–7 to allow Arizona's death row inmates at the time to choose between the gas chamber and lethal injection. All death row inmates sentenced after the law change would not have the option to choose the gas chamber.

During the 1992 election, a referendum allowed Arizonans to vote on whether or not the state should adopt lethal injection; voters approved the change in execution method. Prisoners sentenced to death in Arizona before November 15, 1992, still had the option to choose the gas chamber. Harding was the last prisoner executed in Arizona's gas chamber without having lethal injection as an option, although he was not the last person to die in Arizona's gas chamber overall; in 1999, Walter LaGrand, who was sentenced to death in 1982, requested the gas chamber as his method of execution. To date, he is the most recent person to be executed by hydrogen cyanide gas in a gas chamber in the United States.

Coverage of Harding's execution and its aftermath stated the warden threatened to quit if he were required to perform another gas chamber execution. The New York Times and Newsweek claimed Attorney General Woods became ill and vomited at the sight of Harding's convulsions. Woods later disputed those claims and stated that while he found the execution left a lasting impression with him and was disturbing, he still supported the death penalty in Harding's case and did not become ill at Harding's execution.

== Victims ==
1979

- May (unknown day): Unidentified stabbing victim – Pulaski County, Arkansas
- December 10: Stanton Winston Blanton, 27 – Dallas, Texas

1980

- January 3: Charles Dickerson, 35 – South Lake Tahoe, California
- January 10: Gerald Huth, 39 – near Paso Robles, California
- January 24: Allen F. Gage, 38 – Phoenix, Arizona (convicted)
- January 25: Double killing – Tucson, Arizona
  - Robert Wise, 35 (convicted)
  - Martin Concannon, 33 (convicted)

== See also ==
- Capital punishment in Arizona
- List of people executed in Arizona
- List of people executed in the United States in 1992
- List of rampage killers in the United States
- List of serial killers in the United States
