= Murder of Charles Perez =

2002 murder in Phoenix, Arizona

- Location: Phoenix, Arizona, U.S.
- Date: July 13, 2002
- Attack type: Immolation; napalm attack
- Deaths: Charles Perez
- Injuries: Nova Banta
- Perpetrator: Leroy Dean McGill

The murder of Charles Perez occurred on July 13, 2002, in Phoenix, Arizona, United States, when 22-year-old Perez was doused with a mixture of gasoline and styrofoam and burned alive by 39-year-old Leroy Dean McGill, who also attempted to murder Perez's girlfriend Nova Banta in the same attack. McGill was arrested in Minnesota, tried in Arizona Superior Court and sentenced to death in 2004. McGill was executed by lethal injection on May 20, 2026.

== Background ==
Little is known about Leroy McGill's early life. He had mentioned in the appeals process that he suffered abuse in his childhood, though he also stated in the same appellate courts that his family "cared about him" as a reason to consider mitigating factors in the attempts to have his death sentence commuted. Before the murder of Charles Perez, McGill had served time in prison in Arizona for serious crimes, including armed robbery.

== Murder of Charles Perez ==
In mid-2002, Leroy McGill was living in a complex of apartments in north Phoenix along with multiple other people. Those who lived with him included his girlfriend Jonna Hardesty, Eddie and Kim Keith and their two daughters, Hardesty's brother Jeff Uhl, and a man named Jack Yates. Two other residents were Charles Perez and Nova Banta. The complex belonged to Sophia Barnhart, who lived with her eldest son. By July 2002, conflicts between the tenants were high, especially between Hardesty and Banta, who often clashed and fought.

The situation between those living there escalated to the point where Perez accused McGill and Hardesty of stealing a shotgun from their apartment. As a result of the accusations, McGill and Hardesty were evicted, leaving them homeless. Days later, on July 13, 2002, McGill returned to the complex and told Eddie Keith to leave along with his family because he was going to "teach [Perez] and [Yates] a lesson." Upon Keith's pleading, McGill agreed to spare Yates before proceeding to enter the apartment. Hardesty's brother Jeff Uhl was also present, leaving along with the Keiths. McGill also threatened to kill Keith’s daughters if they said anything about him.

Inside the apartment, Charles Perez and Nova Banta were sitting on a sofa while Jack Yates was resting on another couch. After a brief verbal exchange, McGill doused Perez and Banta with a mixture of gasoline and styrofoam, which he used to create a "sticky napalm-like" substance to cause more pain to Perez and Banta. The fire quickly spread and engulfed the entire complex, forcing another neighbor, Mary Near, to escape her apartment. Severely burnt and screaming in pain, Perez was taken to the hospital, where he died of his injuries the following day. Banta suffered third-degree burns but survived.

== Aftermath ==
Leroy McGill was soon arrested and charged with Perez's aggravated and premeditated murder, as well as a count of attempted murder and others related to arson and endangering the lives of other tenants. The state of Arizona pursued the death penalty against McGill, arguing that he had committed the crimes with premeditation in a cruel and unusual way, adding his past convictions as aggravating factors. Conversely, the defense only called a single witness who said that McGill had not been involved in the fire without providing evidence to support her statement.

== Trial and execution of Leroy McGill ==
Mugshot of McGill

During his trial, Leroy McGill's defense argued that, aside from an abusive childhood, he suffered from mental impairment, that he was psychologically immature, and that his girlfriend had been overdominant in their relationship. McGill was convicted on all counts, with the jury rejecting mitigating factors. During the penalty phase, one of the jurors stated that her religious beliefs could hinder her ability to vote for the death penalty. She was subsequently dismissed. On October 27, 2004, McGill was sentenced to death.

McGill's appeals focused on mitigating factors related to his traumas and addictions, including the assertion that he had smoked marijuana before committing the arson and murder of Charles Perez. Different appellate courts rejected his appeals, considering McGill's crimes "heinous and depraved." By 2022, McGill had exhausted all of his appeals, both at the state and federal levels. In early 2026, the state's attorney asked the state's Supreme Court to issue an execution warrant.

In the weeks after the execution warrant was issued, federal public defenders argued that the jurors in McGill's case were not informed correctly about the alternative to the death sentence, which was a sentence of life in prison without parole. According to the public defenders, jurors were told that McGill would be eligible for parole, despite the state of Arizona having by then eliminated parole as an option at sentencing. As a result, anti-death penalty campaigners urged Governor Katie Hobbs to halt McGill's execution.

On March 26, 2026, the Arizona Supreme Court agreed with the state's request and issued an execution date for McGill for May 20, 2026. The execution by lethal injection was carried out that morning, with McGill pronounced dead at 10:26 a.m. MST. McGill's last meal was onion rings, bread and butter, chocolate cake and a green salad. In his final words, he thanked "everyone for being so accommodating and nice."

== See also ==
- Capital punishment in Arizona
- List of most recent executions by jurisdiction
- List of people executed in Arizona
- List of people executed in the United States in 2026

Executions carried out in Arizona
| Preceded by Richard Djerf October 17, 2025 | Leroy McGill; May 20, 2026 | Succeeded by most recent |
Executions carried out in the United States
| Preceded by Edward Lee Busby Jr. – Texas May 14, 2026 | Leroy McGill – Arizona; May 20, 2026 | Succeeded by Richard Andrew Knight Jr. – Florida May 21, 2026 |
