= Arizona State Prison Complex – Florence =

Prison facility operated by the Arizona Department of Corrections

- Location in Arizona
- Location: Florence, Arizona; 33.027°N 111.370°W
- Status: Closed
- Security class: mixed
- Capacity: Closed except for units transferred under other ASPC complexes (Gov Doug Ducey ordered shut down due to massive costs to operate in 2020)
- Opened: 1908
- Closed: 2022
- Managed by: Arizona Department of Corrections

Arizona State Prison Complex – Florence also known as Florence State Prison (FSP) is a facility operated by the Arizona Department of Corrections (ADC). The facility stopped housing inmates long-term, and currently only houses death row inmates in their final days before the execution at the facility. The main FSP prison was located in Florence, Arizona. The Florence complex used to include a unit in Picacho in unincorporated Pinal County however, the Picacho Unit was closed and razed in early 2013. The Globe Unit in Globe is now part of ASPC-Phoenix.

The Central Unit of ASPC–Florence housed Arizona's one of two male death row cell blocks (the other at Eyman where they were both consolidated when ASPC-Florence closed down) and the State of Arizona execution chamber. FSP is the judicial site in Arizona for state executions since 1910. The death house known on the Unit as Housing Unit 9 is located beside Housing Unit 8. Lethal injection and the gas chamber are the sole methods of execution.

In 1908 inmates finished building and opened the Arizona Prison at Florence. This new prison was to replace the territorial prison in Yuma. The convicts lived in tents while constructing the prison. The new prison featured a death chamber. The chamber was scaffolding above the death row cells that had a trap door for hanging inmates which opened to a room below. In 1934, hanging was replaced with the gas chamber following a botched hanging that took place in 1930. Convicts from Florence were a cheap source of labor and the state used them to build roads through the mountains between Bisbee and Tombstone in 1913. Convicts also built a bridge over the San Pedro River and improved the Douglas Highway. There is a concrete monument there commemorating the completion of the road.

The prison was designed in a mission-revival style architecture.

FSP had an inmate capacity of 3,946 in 6 housing units, housed at level 2, 3 and 5 security levels. The ADC uses a score classification system to assess inmates appropriate custody and security level placement. The scores range from 1 to 5 with 5 being the highest risk or need.

Central Unit was recently changed from a split 3/5 level to a sole maximum security unit.

ASPC Unit	Custody Level
Central Unit	5
East Unit	3
North Unit	2
South Unit (now part of ASPC-Eyman)	2
CB–Kasson	5
Globe	2
Tempe St. Lukes	2–5

== Notable people ==
=== Staff ===
- Frank Eyman (1898–1984), warden; retired in 1974

=== Inmates ===
==== Former ====
- Dale Hausner (1973–2013), serial killer; committed suicide by overdose
- Cris Kirkwood (born 1960), bassist of Meat Puppets; served 21 months for assault
- Charles Schmid (1942–1975), serial killer; escaped briefly in 1972; was murdered in FSP
- Placido Silvas (birth and death unknown), one of two perpetrators of the Ruby Murders; escaped in 1928 and never found
- Willie Steelman (1945–1986), Gretzler's accomplice; died of liver cirrhosis
- Gary Tison (1935–1978), gang leader and murderer; escaped in 1975

===== Executed =====
- Donald Edward Beaty (1955–2011), child rapist and murderer; executed by lethal injection
- Richard Lynn Bible (1962–2011), child rapist and murderer; executed by lethal injection
- Clarence Dixon (1955–2022), murderer; executed by lethal injection
- Eva Dugan (1878–1930), murderer; was decapitated during an attempted hanging
- Randy Greenawalt (1949–1997), serial killer and mass murderer who helped Tison escape; executed by lethal injection
- Douglas Gretzler (1951–1998), serial killer; executed by lethal injection
- Donald Harding (1949–1992), serial/spree killer; executed by gas chamber
- Robert Glen Jones Jr. (1969–2013), one of the two perpetrators of the 1996 Tucson murders; executed by lethal injection
- Walter and Karl-Heinz LaGrand (1962 and 1963–both 1999), brothers and convicted murderers
- Manuel Martinez (c.1895–1923), one of two perpetrators of the Ruby Murders; executed by hanging
- Leroy Dean McGill (1963–2026), murderer and arsonist; executed by lethal injection.
- Joseph R. Wood (1958–2014), double murderer; died from a botched execution by lethal injection

== See also ==
- Thomas H. Rynning
- List of U.S. state prisons
- List of Arizona state prisons
