= Capital punishment in Arizona =

Capital punishment is a legal penalty in the U.S. state of Arizona. There are 107 people on death row as of July 28, 2026. Ninety-seven executions have been carried out since Arizona became a state in 1912. In November 2024, Attorney General Kris Mayes announced that the state would resume executions in 2025 after a two-year pause.

== History ==
The first known execution in Arizona was Dolores Moore during 1865 as a punishment for murder. After Moore, Jose Lopez and eight others became the first individuals executed by hanging at Florence. Arizona abolished the death penalty for murder by popular vote in 1916 after initiatives to eliminate it for convictions of first degree murder, but reinstated it, again by popular vote, in 1918.

Hanging was the primary form of execution used in Arizona until 1930 when a woman named Eva Dugan had her head snapped off by the rope. This created controversy until 1934 when hanging was eliminated in favor of using the gas chamber as the primary execution method.

No executions occurred between 1962 and the national moratorium in 1972. Executions resumed in 1992. Upon resumption of the death penalty, many voters wanted to replace the gas chamber with lethal injection due to the botched gas execution of Donald Harding.

In 2000, Attorney General Janet Napolitano created a Capital Case Commission to study the state's capital punishment laws. The commission issued a report in 2002, proposing changes to the "public defender's office for capital cases, adjustments to laws and court rules, and minimum competency requirements."

In 2007, due to the high number of pending capital cases after the election of Andrew Thomas as Maricopa County Attorney, Arizona Supreme Court Justice Ruth McGregor called for a review of the death penalty. The Arizona Supreme Court created the Capital Case Task Force. The court then established a Capital Case Oversight Committee. The Committee studies "issues affecting the administration of capital cases and propose recommendations to improve the judicial administration of these cases."

After the execution of Joseph Wood in 2014, executions were temporarily halted but resumed in 2022.

On January 23, 2023, new governor Katie Hobbs ordered a review of death penalty protocols and in light of that, newly inaugurated attorney general Kris Mayes issued a hold on executions in the state. Hobbs appointed retired Magistrate Judge David Duncan as the reviewer. However, in November 2024 Hobbs announced that she had canceled Judge Duncan's review after his updates had gone "far afield of her request to review the protocols and procedures" and her concerns were addressed in a separate report by the department of corrections.

The most recent execution in Arizona was that of Leroy Dean McGill on May 20, 2026.

== Legal process ==
When the prosecution seeks the death penalty, the sentence is decided by the jury and must be unanimous.

In case of a hung jury during the penalty phase of the trial, a retrial happens before another jury. If the second jury is also deadlocked, a life sentence is issued.

The Governor of Arizona can grant clemency only with advice and consent of the five-member Arizona Board of Executive Clemency.

Arizona's death row for males is located at the Rincon Unit of the Arizona State Prison Complex – Tucson. Female death row prisoners are housed at the Lumley Unit of the Arizona State Prison Complex – Perryville. Executions occur at the Central Unit of the Arizona State Prison Complex – Florence.

== Capital crimes ==
Ten specific aggravating circumstances constitute capital murder in the State of Arizona:

1. prior conviction for which a sentence of life imprisonment or death was imposable;
2. prior serious offense involving the use of threat or violence;
3. procurement of murder by payment or promise of payment;
4. murder committed in an especially heinous, cruel, or depraved manner;
5. murder committed while in custody;
6. multiple homicides;
7. murder of a victim under 15 years of age or of a victim 70 years of age or older;
8. murder of a law enforcement officer;
9. to promote or join a criminal street gang;
10. to prevent cooperation with law enforcement or testimony in court.

== Execution methods ==
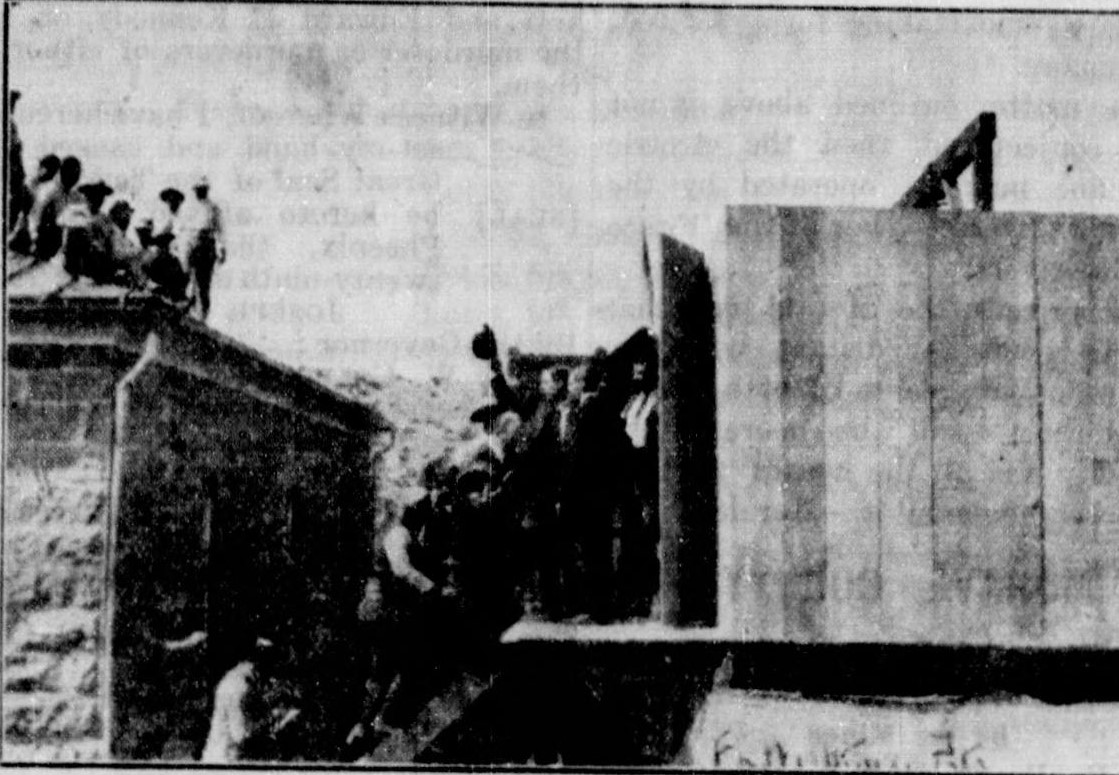
Hanging of Zack Booth in Globe, Arizona Territory 1905

Arizona has used hanging, lethal gas, and lethal injection as its execution methods.

=== Hanging ===
From Statehood until 1931, the primary execution method was hanging. Nineteen executions by hanging occurred between April 16, 1920, and June 20, 1931.

=== Gas Execution ===
The first gas execution occurred in 1934. Since capital punishment was resumed in 1976, 41 people in Arizona convicted of murder have been executed at Florence State Prison in Florence, Arizona.

After the controversial and much-publicized 1992 execution of Donald Eugene Harding, who took 10 and 1/2 minutes to die, the voters changed the method to lethal injection. However, inmates convicted for capital crimes committed prior to November 23, 1992, may choose gas inhalation instead. The last gas execution was Walter LaGrand on March 3, 1999 having been pronounced dead after 18 minutes of the gas flowing into the room. Though in 2021, the gas chamber was refurbished and $2,000 worth of cyanide gas ingredients were procured, in order to execute inmates by hydrogen cyanide. Many are very upset with this as the execution would use the same chemicals and method that the Nazis used to kill millions.

=== Lethal injection drugs ===
Since 1992, Arizona has employed lethal injection for its executions.

Until 2010, Arizona used sodium thiopental as the primary drug in its execution protocol until the drug stopped being commercially available. The state began exploring using midazolam and pentobarbital. In 2011, the state was found to be buying execution drugs from Dream Pharma, a pharmaceutical company operating out of a driving school in west London, UK.

The 2014 botched execution of Joseph Wood using only midazolam lead to a moratorium of executions until July 2019. The State entered a settlement agreement that bars it from using Midazolam.

In 2015, Arizona tried to import sodium thiopental from India, but the shipment was seized by federal officials at Phoenix Sky Harbor airport.

In October 2019, Arizona's department of corrections paid $1.5m to a confidential source for 1,000 1g vials of pentobarbital. In a 2024 episode of Last Week Tonight, comedian John Oliver claimed that Arizona had acquired the drugs from the Connecticut chemical company Absolute Standards.

=== Proposed methods ===
Representative Alexander Kolodin and co-sponsor Laurin Hendrix presented the House Concurrent Resolution 2024, which would allow the question, 'whether Arizona should replace its primary method of execution with firing squads', to be presented to voters directly.

== Notable capital cases ==
- Tison v. Arizona, holding death penalty was an appropriate punishment for a felony murderer in certain cases.
- LaGrand case, concerning the Vienna Convention on Consular Relations.
- Ring v. Arizona, requiring a jury to find aggravating circumstances necessary for imposition of the death penalty. Overruling Walton v. Arizona.
- Schriro v. Summerlin, holding that Ring is not retroactive.
- Lynch v. Arizona, holding that Simmons v. South Carolina applies in Arizona.
- Cruz v. Arizona, holding that Lynch was a significant change in Arizona law.
- McKinney v. Arizona, addressing appellate reweighing of mitigation evidence.

== See also ==
- Crime in Arizona
- Law of Arizona
- List of death row inmates in the United States § Arizona
- List of people executed in Arizona
- List of people executed in Arizona (pre-1972)
