= Murder of Kenneth Meers =

1992 robbery-murder of a convenience store owner in Oklahoma City

Kenneth Meers
- Kenneth Meers, who was shot to death during a robbery in 1992
- Born: Kenneth Meers; November 2, 1960; Indianapolis, Indiana, U.S.
- Died: June 19, 1992 (aged 31); Oklahoma City, Oklahoma, U.S.
- Cause of death: Fatal gunshot wound to the face
- Resting place: Resthaven Memory Gardens
- Education: Southeast High School
- Occupation: Convenience store owner
- Known for: Victim of a robbery-murder case

On June 19, 1992, in Oklahoma City, Oklahoma, United States, 31-year-old convenience store owner Kenneth Meers (November 2, 1960 – June 19, 1992) was murdered during a robbery perpetrated by two gunmen. The murderers, Glenn Bethany and Emmanuel Littlejohn, were arrested and charged with robbing and murdering Meers. Littlejohn was sentenced to death, while Bethany received a life sentence in separate trials between 1993 and 1994.

A controversial point in the case was the lack of direct evidence proving who had killed Meers. Littlejohn maintained his innocence throughout his appeals, but these claims were rejected by the courts. After losing his clemency plea, Littlejohn was executed via lethal injection on September 26, 2024.

== Murder ==
On the night of June 19, 1992, a robbery occurred at a convenience store in Oklahoma City, resulting in the death of the store owner, who was shot by two robbers.

On that night, at around 10:15 p.m., 31-year-old Kenneth Meers, the owner of the convenience store, was working with two employees, Tony Hulsey and Hulsey's brother, Danny Waldrup. While they were still doing their work, 20-year-old Emmanuel Antonia Littlejohn (Note: Some sources listed his full name as Emmanuel Antonio Littlejohn, with his middle name spelt differently.) and 25-year-old Glenn Roy Bethany entered the store and held Meers at gunpoint, with the intention of robbing him.

At that time, Littlejohn, who had a long criminal record, had just come out of prison for burglary, robbery, and assault, and Bethany was a drug dealer. The two men both owed money to a drug dealer known to them and as they were out of money, the pair decided to commit an armed robbery in order to obtain cash to repay the debt. Armed with a gun, both Littlejohn and Bethany barged into the store and held Meers at gunpoint. During the armed hold-up, one of the men shot Meers in the face. Both men then fled the store. The crime was witnessed by several people, including two of Meers' co-workers and bystanders outside the store. Meers died as a result of the shooting. At the time of his death, Meers, who was born in Indiana, left behind his mother, three brothers, and two sisters. His father died in 1984. Meers was laid to rest at Resthaven Memory Gardens after his funeral at South Colonial Chapel.

There were conflicting witness testimonies over the identity of the killer and whether it was Littlejohn or Bethany who pulled the trigger. One theory was that the man who murdered Meers was Littlejohn, because according to Hulsey, he witnessed Littlejohn holding Meers at gunpoint before the shooting and both Hulsey and Waldrup never saw Bethany carrying a gun. However, witnesses outside the store claimed that the shooter was the taller of the two, and based on the description of the two robbers, who were both African American, Bethany had darker skin than Littlejohn, and he was much taller than Littlejohn, which gave rise to the other theory that Bethany was the shooter. However, no direct evidence was able to prove either theory.

Soon after the shooting, Bethany was arrested in Oklahoma City and remanded without bail at Oklahoma County Jail. Littlejohn remained on the run for about five days before he was apprehended in Wichita, Kansas, and extradited back to Oklahoma to be charged and tried for killing Meers. The two men were thus charged with the robbery-murder of Meers.

In a separate case, together with William Arnold Penny, Littlejohn was also charged with robbery with a dangerous weapon, two counts of first-degree rape and kidnapping.

== Trials of Bethany and Littlejohn ==
On March 11, 1993, Glenn Bethany was convicted of robbery and murder. The prosecution sought the death penalty for Bethany during his sentencing phase. However, Bethany was spared the death sentence and instead, he was jailed for life without chance for parole.

A year after Bethany was convicted and sentenced, Emmanuel Littlejohn stood trial in early 1994 before a jury at the District Court of Oklahoma County. During the trial, Littlejohn maintained his innocence and stated that while he participated in the robbery, he was not the person who killed Meers. He pinpointed Bethany as the killer. Both Bethany and the prosecution argued it was Littlejohn who shot and killed Meers.

On November 15, 1994, Littlejohn was found guilty of murder, robbery, and attempted robbery.

Three days after Littlejohn's conviction, on November 18, 1994, the jury returned with their verdict after more than six hours of deliberation, sentencing Littlejohn to death for murder. They also issued a jail term of 300 years for robbery and a consecutive 99 years for attempted robbery.

On November 23, 1994, Littlejohn was formally sentenced to death by Oklahoma County District Judge Charles L. Owens.

== Appeals of Littlejohn ==
After he was sentenced to death, Emmanuel Littlejohn spent about three decades appealing against his sentence, and in all of his appeals, Littlejohn argued that he was innocent and that he never gunned down Kenneth Meers. However, none of his claims were accepted by the courts.

=== First appeal and re-sentencing ===
On December 31, 1998, the Oklahoma Court of Criminal Appeals upheld the convictions of Littlejohn for the robbery-murder of Kenneth Meers, but his death sentence for the murder of Meers was vacated in favor of a re-sentencing hearing due to the need to reconsider the evidence so as to determine if the aggravating factors made Littlejohn eligible for either death or life without parole.

A re-sentencing trial of Littlejohn took place in October 2000 and it ended on November 8, 2000, with the jury once again issuing the death penalty for Littlejohn. Littlejohn likewise appealed to the Oklahoma Court of Criminal Appeals against this decision, but on February 12, 2004, his appeal was dismissed after the court found his death sentence safe to affirm.

=== Further appeals ===
In an appeal before District Judge Vicki Miles-LaGrange of the United States District Court for the Western District of Oklahoma on May 27, 2010, the lawyers of Littlejohn submitted that the same prosecutor who handled both the trials of Bethany and Littlejohn had argued at Bethany's trial that Bethany was the shooter and later argued at Littlejohn's trial that the killer was Littlejohn. However, the court found that there was no error made by the prosecutor, as the court determined that, during Bethany's trial, the prosecutor did not explicitly claim that Bethany was the shooter. Instead, the prosecutor merely "reminded the jurors that their job was to decide whether Bethany was guilty of malice murder or felony murder." The court also observed that in Littlejohn's trial, the prosecutor took a more assertive stance, firmly declaring that Littlejohn was indeed the shooter. The 10th U.S. Circuit Court of Appeals heard Littlejohn's follow-up appeal and rejected it on June 25, 2010.

A second appeal to the 10th U.S. Circuit Court of Appeals was also dismissed on January 7, 2013. Four years later, the 10th U.S. Circuit Court of Appeals would later turn down a third appeal from Littlejohn on November 7, 2017.

On October 2, 2018, the U.S. Supreme Court refused to hear Littlejohn's appeal in his case, which led to Littlejohn losing his final chance of escaping the death sentence, and he became eligible for execution on a date to be decided.

== Fate of Littlejohn ==
Emmanuel Antonia Littlejohn
- Littlejohn's 2003 Mugshot
- Born: November 9, 1971; Oklahoma, U.S.
- Died: September 26, 2024 (aged 52); Oklahoma State Penitentiary, Oklahoma, U.S.
- Cause of death: Execution by lethal injection
- Motive: Robbery
- Convictions: First degree murder Robbery; Attempted robbery (2 counts); Conspiracy; Burglary (2 counts); Assault/battery with a weapon (2 counts)
- Penalty: 300 years' imprisonment (robbery); Eight years' imprisonment (attempted robbery); Death (murder)

Details
- Victims: Kenneth Meers, 31
- Date: June 19, 1992
- Location: Oklahoma City
- Imprisoned at: Oklahoma State Penitentiary

While he was appealing against his death sentence, Emmanuel Littlejohn remained on death row at Oklahoma State Penitentiary. At one point while awaiting to be re-sentenced, Littlejohn allegedly heard a fellow prisoner named Christopher Jordan confessing to the 1999 murder of Paul Howell, a crime for which his accomplice Julius Jones was sentenced to death. Jones, whose execution was scheduled to occur on November 18, 2021, had protested his innocence throughout the years and pointed to Jordan as the real killer. Jones's death sentence was, in the end, commuted to life imprisonment without parole merely hours before his scheduled execution.

In 2018, when Oklahoma prepared to pass laws to allow executions by nitrogen gas inhalation, Littlejohn and other inmates on death row gave their opinions on the new execution method, and Littlejohn did not agree with the method.

As of February 2020, Littlejohn was one of the 26 death row inmates eligible for execution after exhausting his appeals since October 2018.

=== Scheduling of execution date ===
In August 2022, two months after a death row inmate's failed legal challenge against the constitutionality of Oklahoma's execution protocols, the death warrant of Littlejohn was finalized and the execution date was slated to be November 2, 2023; Littlejohn was one of the 25 inmates to have their execution dates scheduled after the ruling itself. However, Littlejohn's execution was delayed for presumed legal reasons.

In January 2024, Oklahoma Attorney General Gentner Drummond filed a legal application to the Oklahoma Court of Criminal Appeals, seeking approval to schedule the executions of six prisoners, whose death dates would be 90 days apart from each other. Littlejohn was one of those six prisoners on the list.

On July 3, 2024, Littlejohn's second death warrant was released and he was scheduled to be executed on September 26, 2024. Prior to the rescheduling of Littlejohn's execution, convicted rapist-killer Richard Norman Rojem Jr. was put to death on June 27, 2024, for raping and murdering his stepdaughter 40 years ago in July 1984.

=== Clemency campaign ===
==== Clemency hearing ====
After his execution date was set, anti-death penalty activists took up Littlejohn's case and began a campaign to appeal for clemency on behalf of Littlejohn. Reverend Jeff Hood, a spiritual advisor for death row prisoners, and Abraham Bonowitz, co-founder of an anti-death penalty group, conducted a media conference and both of them stated that Littlejohn deserved mercy given that there was no conclusive evidence to prove that Littlejohn was the killer and that his guilt was not clear-cut. They said it would be an injustice if Bethany were the real killer and Littlejohn was executed for the fatal shooting of Meers despite not pulling the trigger. Hood said he was planning to attend the execution of Littlejohn to accompany him and give him spiritual guidance should Littlejohn's clemency bid be unsuccessful.

Littlejohn's clemency hearing took place before the Oklahoma Pardon and Parole Board on August 7, 2024. During the hearing, Littlejohn admitted responsibility for the robbery at Meers's convenience store, but maintained that he did not kill Meers, continuing to argue that Bethany pulled the trigger. Expressing remorse for his part in the death of Meers, Littlejohn asked for forgiveness and offered his sympathy for the family of Meers over their loss. Additionally, Littlejohn's mother, who was 15 when she gave birth to him, pleaded for mercy for her only son, whose death sentence caused her to quit her drug addiction, a problem she struggled with since her adolescent years and pregnancy.

However, Meers's family asked the state to proceed with the execution, describing Meers as a "community-minded" man who was willing to help those in need. One of Meers's brothers told the parole board that his mother died of a broken heart after losing her son, and also read out the final letter of Meers's mother before the board. Additionally, Attorney General Drummond urged the parole board to not grant clemency for Littlejohn, given that Littlejohn was a "violent and manipulative" person who refused to take responsibility for his actions, and added that the family of Meers waited for 32 years with hopes that justice could be served.

==== Clemency outcome ====
On the same day of the hearing, by a majority vote of 3–2, the state pardon board recommended clemency for Littlejohn, whose fate was at the hands of the Oklahoma state governor Kevin Stitt, who had the discretion to either reject clemency and allow the execution or grant Littlejohn clemency and commute his death sentence to life in prison without the possibility of parole. Bill Meers, the victim's brother, expressed both his disappointment and anger at the decision, and stated that he wanted the death penalty to be carried out. Attorney General Drummond also expressed his disappointment but also thanked the board for their due consideration of the case. Throughout his tenure as governor, Stitt had only granted clemency once, to convicted killer Julius Jones, while he refused the parole board's recommendation to grant clemency in the cases of Bigler Stouffer, James Allen Coddington and Phillip Dean Hancock, who were all executed.

A representative of the governor's office released a statement on September 24, stating that Governor Stitt met up with the family of the victim and both prosecutors and lawyers alike and still deliberating on whether to spare the life of Littlejohn. While the governor was still deciding whether to grant clemency to Littlejohn, his supporters continued to ask the authorities to commute Littlejohn's death sentence to life imprisonment. It was argued that Littlejohn was willing to appreciate it should he be given a second chance and would spend more time with his daughter and grandchild. Kay Thompson, a spokesperson for the Oklahoma Department of Corrections, confirmed that preparations were ongoing to prepare for the execution procedure in advance while pending the clemency order.

On the eve of Littlejohn's scheduled execution, the family of the late Kenneth Meers spoke up in the media about the case. They described Meers as a kind-hearted man who often helped people to buy groceries whenever they were out of money, and every year before he died, Meers would conduct a Christmas raffle for neighborhood kids, and stated that Meers first worked at the store at age 13 and having grown to love his job, he and his brother Bill Meers would procure the store and operated it together. Bill stated that he would not forgive Littlejohn for murdering his brother, whom the prosecution described as a man who "simply did not have a mean bone in his body".

While the clemency process was still ongoing, Littlejohn's lawyers filed a last-minute appeal for a stay of execution, but the Oklahoma Court of Criminal Appeals rejected the appeal. Another appeal filed in federal court was also rejected hours before the execution.

On the morning of September 26, 2024, Governor Stitt announced that he would not grant clemency to Littlejohn. In his statement, Stitt said that as a "law and order" governor, he had difficulty with unilaterally commuting the death sentence of Littlejohn, which was issued by the jury and affirmed by the higher courts in multiple appeals, and hence chose to not grant clemency and hoped that the families affected by the murder of Meers could find closure.

=== Execution ===
On the morning of September 26, 2024, 52-year-old Emmanuel Antonia Littlejohn was put to death via lethal injection at Oklahoma State Penitentiary. Littlejohn was reportedly administered with a three-drug lethal injection of midazolam, vecuronium bromide and potassium chloride, and later pronounced dead at 10:17am. Before losing consciousness, Littlejohn was reported to have turned to his mother and daughter and said his last words, "Everything is going to be OK. I love you."

Although none of Meers's family members spoke to the media after the execution, they provided a media statement to the Attorney General Gentner Drummond, who read it out in a press conference. In the statement, the Meers family expressed their appreciation and gratitude for the efforts of the state authorities to bring Littlejohn to justice. Drummond similarly stated that justice was served for Meers with the execution of Littlejohn and he supported the execution. On the other hand, abolitionists condemned the execution, and among them, Don Heath, a member of the Oklahoma Coalition to Abolish the Death Penalty, criticised Stitt for his failure to notify Littlejohn until the last minute that he refused to grant clemency, which amounted to "a needless infliction of emotional distress" in Heath's words.

Prior to the execution, Littlejohn had requested a meat pizza, Coca-Cola and two slices of cheesecake as his final meal. According to anti-death penalty activist Jeff Hood, Littlejohn had his final meetings with his mother and stepfather, and made last phone calls to his daughter and granddaughter.

Littlejohn was one of the five inmates across five different states in the U.S. who were slated to be executed within a one-week period between September 20 and September 26, 2024. The other four inmates were Freddie Eugene Owens, convicted of the murder of a convenience store clerk in South Carolina in 1997; Marcellus Williams, convicted of the fatal stabbing of a former reporter in Missouri in 1998; Travis James Mullis, convicted of the murder of his son in Texas in 2008; and Alan Eugene Miller, convicted of shooting and killing three people in Alabama in 1999. One of these five inmates, Freddie Owens, was put to death on September 20, while another two, Travis Mullis and Marcellus Williams, the latter who protested his innocence, were executed within an hour of each other on September 24. Miller and Littlejohn were both slated to be executed on the same date; Miler was put to death via nitrogen gas inhalation about eight hours after Littlejohn's execution.

With the executions of both Littlejohn and Miller, the number of executions in the U.S. since 1976 — the same year when capital punishment was reinstated in the U.S. — had reached 1,600 in total. Both Littlejohn and Miller were the 17th and 18th persons respectively to be executed in the U.S. in 2024. Littlejohn was the third inmate to be executed in Oklahoma state jurisdiction during that same year.

== See also ==
- Capital punishment in Oklahoma
- List of people executed in Oklahoma
- List of people executed in the United States in 2024

Executions carried out in Oklahoma
| Preceded by Richard Norman Rojem Jr. June 27, 2024 | Emmanuel Antonia Littlejohn; September 26, 2024 | Succeeded by Kevin Ray Underwood December 19, 2024 |
Executions carried out in the United States
| Preceded by Travis James Mullis – Texas September 24, 2024 | Emmanuel Antonia Littlejohn – Oklahoma; September 26, 2024 | Succeeded by Alan Eugene Miller – Alabama September 26, 2024 |
