= 1999 Tulsa County double murder =

1999 double murder in Tulsa County, Oklahoma, United States

- Location: Tulsa County, Oklahoma, United States
- Date: August 31, 1999
- Attack type: Murders by shooting
- Victims: Mary Agnes Bowles, 77; Jerald Max Thurman, 44
- Verdict: Guilty
- Convictions: First-degree murder (×2)
- Sentence: Death (Hanson); Life imprisonment without the possibility of parole (Miller)
- Convicted: George John Hanson, 35; Victor Cornell Miller, 36

The 1999 Tulsa County double murder took place on August 31, 1999, in Tulsa County, Oklahoma, United States, when both George John Hanson (April 8, 1964 – June 12, 2025; alias John Fitzgerald Hanson) and Victor Cornell Miller (born January 18, 1963) first carjacked 77-year-old retired banker Mary Agnes Bowles in Tulsa and forcibly took her to a dirt pit near Owasso, where Hanson shot and killed her. Prior to the murder of Bowles, the carjacking was witnessed by local resident Jerald Max Thurman, who was shot and mortally wounded by Miller; Thurman would die two weeks later in the hospital.

Hanson and Miller were both arrested after the robbery of a credit union eight days after the murders of Thurman and Bowles. After investigation, they were charged and convicted in separate trials for the murders. Hanson was sentenced to death for Bowles's murder, plus life without parole for Thurman's murder. Miller was originally sentenced to death for his role in the double murder, but after multiple appeals, he was re-sentenced to life without parole for both cases, first in 2013 and then again in 2015. Additionally, Hanson was convicted of federal bank robbery charges for the credit union robbery.

Hanson was initially scheduled to be executed by Oklahoma on December 15, 2022; however, the federal authorities under the Biden administration refused to transfer him to Oklahoma from the USP Pollock federal prison in Louisiana, where he was serving a concurrent life sentence for the federal conviction. In 2025, after the new U.S. Attorney General Pam Bondi directed prison authorities to do so, federal authorities transferred Hanson to Oklahoma, and his execution was ultimately carried out by lethal injection on June 12, 2025, at the Oklahoma State Penitentiary.

== Murders of Bowles and Thurman ==
On August 31, 1999, in Tulsa County, Oklahoma, two men – George John Hanson (alias John Fitzgerald Hanson) and Victor Cornell Miller – committed the carjacking and murder of an elderly woman, as well as the murder of a man who witnessed the crime.

On that evening, 77-year-old Mary Agnes Bowles, a retired Tulsa banker and former St. Francis Hospital Auxiliary president, was kidnapped by the duo from a Tulsa Promenade mall parking lot. Hanson and Miller, who both had earlier robbed two liquor stores, carjacked Bowles as they planned to use her vehicle for facilitate more robberies. Miller acted as the driver while Hanson held Bowles at gunpoint in the back seat, and they drove to a dirt pit near Owasso.

Coincidentally, the dirt pit's owner, 44-year-old Jerald Max Thurman, who also headed an Owasso trucking company, was present in the area making a delivery when he witnessed the Bowles's car circling through the pit. Thurman reportedly conveyed what he saw to his nephew in a phone conversation, but shortly after he made the phone call, Thurman was attacked by Miller, who fired a revolver and shot him four times, to silence him as a witness to the abduction of Bowles.

Meanwhile, after the pair drove for a distance and stopped at a roadside, Bowles was brought out of the car by Hanson, who shot her four to six times with a semi-automatic pistol and killed her on the spot. Afterwards, Hanson and Miller partially covered up the body with branches and escaped the area. While the body of Bowles was found a week later on September 7, 1999, Thurman was found soon after he was shot, as witnesses heard the gunshot sounds, which led them to where Thurman was attacked. Thurman was thereafter rushed to hospital, but he died two weeks later on September 14, 1999.

On September 9, 1999, Hanson and Miller were both arrested at a local motel for robbing a federal credit union on September 8. Subsequently, the police investigations linked them both to the murders of Thurman and Bowles, after the pair's fingerprints were discovered on Bowles's car, and the investigators found a .38-caliber revolver and a 9 mm semiautomatic pistol wrapped in plastic inside the tank, which were deduced to be the murder weapons used in the double murder. Afterwards, the men were charged with the murders of Thurman and Bowles. Hanson and Miller were also charged with additional counts of robbery under federal law for several unrelated cases committed before and after the murders.

== Murder trials of Hanson and Miller ==
=== Hanson's trial ===
In May 2001, George Hanson, who had previous convictions from 1983 to 1990 for robbery and assault, first stood trial alone for the first-degree murders of Jerald Thurman and Mary Bowles.

On May 18, 2001, a Tulsa County jury found Hanson guilty of first-degree murder on both counts, after deliberating the case for nearly five hours. District Attorney Tim Harris reportedly sought the death penalty for Hanson.

On May 23, 2001, the jury returned with their verdict on sentence, recommending the death penalty for the charge of murdering Bowles, in addition to life imprisonment without the possibility of parole for the other charge of murdering Thurman.

In the aftermath, despite his death sentence in Oklahoma, Hanson was not imprisoned on death row in Oklahoma, because he was tried by the federal courts for unrelated bank robbery charges and other offenses, and ultimately, he was sentenced to life imprisonment and sent to the USP Pollock federal penitentiary in Louisiana.

=== Miller's trial ===
Victor Miller was the second to stand trial after Hanson. This was not Miller's first trial for first-degree murder, because in 1981, Miller was initially sentenced to life in prison for first-degree murder in another case, plus three 30-year concurrent prison terms for armed robbery, before his conviction was reduced to second-degree murder and he was released in 1997. Miller was also tried by the federal authorities for unrelated robbery charges and sentenced to life imprisonment before he was extradited back to Oklahoma to stand trial for the 1999 Bowles-Thurman murders.

On April 17, 2002, Miller was found guilty by another Tulsa County jury in a separate court for the first-degree murders of Bowles and Thurman.

On April 19, 2002, Miller was sentenced to death for the murder of Bowles, in addition to life without parole for the murder of Thurman.

== Appellate process ==
=== Hanson's appeals ===
On June 11, 2003, the Oklahoma Court of Criminal Appeals vacated the death sentence of George Hanson, and allowed his case to be remanded back to the trial court for re-sentencing.

Three years later, after a re-trial lasting from January 9 to January 24, 2006, Hanson was once again sentenced to death for the murder of Mary Bowles. On April 13, 2009, the Oklahoma Court of Criminal Appeals dismissed Hanson's appeal against his death sentence.

On July 1, 2013, the U.S. District Court for the Northern District of Oklahoma rejected Hanson's appeal.

On August 13, 2015, Hanson's appeal was denied by the 10th Circuit Court of Appeals.

On May 16, 2016, the U.S. Supreme Court ultimately rejected Hanson's appeal and confirmed his death sentence.

On September 10, 2021, Hanson's appeal against his death sentence was rejected by the Oklahoma Court of Criminal Appeals.

Hanson was one of 28 death row inmates in Oklahoma who filed a lawsuit against the state over Oklahoma's execution protocol, and the lawsuit was dismissed in June 2022 after the courts ruled that there was no breach of constitutionality in the death penalty laws of Oklahoma.

=== Miller's appeals and commutation of death sentences ===
Victor Miller 2017 Mugshot

After his sentencing, Victor Miller appealed against his conviction and sentence. In 2004, the Oklahoma Court of Criminal Appeals allowed Miller's appeal, overturned all his convictions and sentences, and ordered a re-trial.

Following a re-trial in November 2008, Miller was once again found guilty of both counts of first-degree murder before a different jury, which recommended two death sentences for Miller that same month. Judge Dana Kuehn officially sentenced Miller to death on December 9, 2008.

On September 6, 2013, the Oklahoma Court of Criminal Appeals heard the second appeal of Miller, and ruled that one of Miller's death sentences should be commuted to life in prison without parole, and that the other death sentence of Miller should be overturned in favor of a new re-sentencing hearing.

In November 2015, ahead of Miller's second re-sentencing trial, the Tulsa County prosecutors decided to take the death penalty off the table in Miller's case, and as a result, Miller was sentenced to a second term of life without parole.

As of 2025, Miller remains incarcerated at the Oklahoma State Reformatory.

== First scheduled execution date for Hanson in 2022 ==
After exhausting his appeals against his death sentence in 2016, George Hanson remained incarcerated at the USP Pollock federal prison in Louisiana while awaiting execution in Oklahoma. A February 2020 report confirmed that Hanson was one of 26 inmates eligible for execution after exhausting all available appeals against the conviction and sentence.

At the time, Oklahoma had halted its use of capital punishment after experiencing problems in the practice, including a badly botched execution in 2014 and two mix-ups involving preparation or actual use of the wrong drug in 2015. The use of executions in Oklahoma resumed in October 2021.

On July 1, 2022, the Oklahoma Court of Criminal Appeals scheduled execution dates for 25 death row prisoners, all of whom had exhausted their appeals against their sentences, over a 29-month period. Hanson's execution was tentatively scheduled to take place by lethal injection on December 15, 2022. A clemency hearing was set for Hanson on November 9, 2022.

Although the Oklahoma state authorities asked for the federal jurisdiction's approval to transfer Hanson to a state prison in Oklahoma to carry out his upcoming execution, the request was ultimately denied. It was speculated that the refusal of the transfer might be related to a federal moratorium on the use of capital punishment under the Biden administration, but no clear relationship was established. In October 2022, the Oklahoma Attorney General John M. O'Connor sued the Federal Bureau of Prisons for refusing to send Hanson back to Oklahoma for execution.

On December 13, 2022, U.S. District Judge Reed O'Connor denied the request by Oklahoma to order Hanson to be transferred to the state penitentiary to face execution, and the ruling indefinitely stayed his execution until further notice. Judge O'Connor stated that the Federal Bureau of Prisons had broad discretion whether to facilitate such a request based on public interest.

== Rescheduled execution date for Hanson in 2025 ==
On January 23, 2025, three days after Donald Trump succeeded Joe Biden as U.S. President, Oklahoma Attorney General Gentner Drummond applied for George Hanson to be transferred from Louisiana to Oklahoma to face execution for the murder of Mary Bowles. This decision was made after Trump signed an executive order to direct the U.S. Department of Justice to actively enforce the use of capital punishment and Drummond made use of the order to justify his application to transfer Hanson back to Oklahoma to undergo execution, and he quoted on the previous decision by the Biden administration to refuse their 2022 transfer request, saying "The prior administration's refusal to transfer Inmate Hanson to state custody to finally carry out a decades-old death sentence is the epitome of subverting and obstructing the execution of a capital sentence."

George Hanson Mugshot, One day after he was transferred to an Oklahoma prison

On February 13, 2025, U.S. Attorney General Pam Bondi approved the request of Drummond to have Hanson transferred to an Oklahoma prison to facilitate his execution on a date to be decided. On March 3, 2025, it was widely reported that Hanson had been transferred from USP Pollock to the Oklahoma State Penitentiary, the state's designated facility for male death row prisoners.

On April 1, 2025, the Oklahoma Court of Criminal Appeals set an execution date for Hanson as June 12, 2025.

In response to the scheduled execution of Hanson, Jake Thurman, whose father, Jerald Thurman, was killed by Hanson and his accomplice, expressed that justice was set to arrive after he waited for close to three decades for Hanson to be executed, although he did not conceal his disappointment that it took so long for it to finally come. Jake stated that the loss of his father was deep and still brought about a string of raw emotions, and described Thurman as "his hero and friend", and further mentioned that his children greatly resembled his father, which helped him see his father again through another way. Jake revealed that back in 2022, when Hanson's execution was indefinitely stayed due to the Biden administration barring his transfer to Oklahoma, he and his mother were both devastated and his mother died less than two months later due to organ failure. Jake also stated that he felt a lack of closure when Hanson's accomplice was spared the death sentence but was also glad that the court process was finally over, and he also forgave both the killers for killing his father back then.

A clemency hearing was scheduled for Hanson on May 7, 2025, and Hanson's lawyers planned to seek the commutation of Hanson's death sentence to life without parole. Oklahoma Attorney General Gentner Drummond urged Oklahoma Pardon and Parole Board to deny clemency for Hanson: "It is my firm hope that any plea for clemency is denied for the man who brutally murdered 77-year-old Mary Bowles more than 25 years ago," said Drummond. "This murderer's execution has been delayed for far too long. I am committed to ensuring that the Bowles family finally sees that justice is done for their loved one."

On May 7, 2025, by a 3–2 decision, the Oklahoma Pardon and Parole Board voted to refuse clemency for Hanson, and this led to Oklahoma Governor Kevin Stitt becoming unable to commute Hanson's sentence to life without parole.

On June 9, 2025, three days before his scheduled execution was to proceed, an Oklahoma judge temporarily stayed his execution. Hanson's lawyers claimed he didn't receive a fair clemency hearing, further claiming a board member, Sean Malloy, was not impartial to Hanson's case. However, the Oklahoma Court of Criminal Appeals overturned the stay on June 10, 2025, clearing the way for his execution to take place on June 12. In addition, the U.S Supreme Court declined to hear Hanson’s final appeal hours before his scheduled execution.

== Execution of Hanson ==
On June 12, 2025, 61-year-old George John Hanson was put to death by lethal injection at the Oklahoma State Penitentiary. The official time of death was 10:11am. Prior to his execution, Hanson did not make a special last meal request, but he received the regular prison meal of chicken pot pie, two rolls, two fruit cups and carrots.

Shortly after the execution of Hanson, Oklahoma Attorney General Gentner Drummond affirmed in a media statement that the state of Oklahoma would not spare any effort to hold murderers accountable for their crimes, and that justice was served for both Jerald Thurman and Mary Bowles after they were murdered by Hanson more than two decades prior, and Hanson's execution was just for heinous homicides like those of Thurman and Bowles. Thurman's son, who attended the execution of Hanson, stated that witnessing the execution of one of his father's murderers marked the end of a long-running nightmare on his part.

== See also ==
- Capital punishment in Oklahoma
- List of people executed in Oklahoma
- List of people executed in the United States in 2025

Executions carried out in Oklahoma
Preceded by Wendell Grissom March 20, 2025	John Hanson; June 12, 2025	Succeeded by Kendrick Simpson February 12, 2026
Executions carried out in the United States
Preceded by Gregory Hunt – Alabama June 10, 2025	John Hanson – Oklahoma; June 12, 2025	Succeeded by Stephen Stanko – South Carolina June 13, 2025
