= Murder of Linda Reaves =

1985 murder in Oklahoma City, U.S.

- Linda Kay Reaves, pictured before her death
- Date: January 24, 1985
- Location: Oklahoma City, Oklahoma, U.S.
- Outcome: Stouffer executed via lethal injection on December 9, 2021
- Deaths: Linda Reaves, 35
- Injuries: Douglas Ivens, 33
- Convicted: Bigler Jobe Stouffer II, 42
- Convictions: First-degree murder Attempted murder
- Sentence: Murder; Death; Attempted murder Life imprisonment

On January 24, 1985, in Oklahoma City, 35-year-old schoolteacher Linda Reaves (November 5, 1949 – January 24, 1985) and her boyfriend Douglas Ivens were both shot by Bigler Stouffer (September 25, 1942 – December 9, 2021). Stouffer was the boyfriend of Ivens's estranged wife Velva Ivens, who targeted Ivens for his $2 million life insurance policy. Ivens survived three gunshot wounds to his body, but Reaves was mortally wounded and died from two gunshot wounds to the head.

Stouffer was arrested and charged with the murder of Reaves and attempted murder of Ivens, who testified against Stouffer in his trial. Stouffer was found guilty of murdering Reaves and sentenced to death, and he was additionally given life in prison for shooting Ivens. Stouffer, whose death sentence was overturned in 1999 before it was reinstated in 2003, was incarcerated on death row for 36 years before he was executed via lethal injection on December 9, 2021.

== Shootings and death of Reaves ==
On January 24, 1985, in Oklahoma City, a gunman fatally shot 35-year-old Linda Kay Reaves, a schoolteacher at the Putnam City elementary school, and seriously wounded her boyfriend Douglas Scott Ivens, a homebuilder, at Ivens's house. Ivens, who sustained three gunshot wounds (including one on the face), survived the shooting. However, Reaves, who was shot twice in the head by the gunman, died on the spot. The gunman, later identified as Bigler Jobe "Bud" Stouffer II, was the boyfriend of Ivens's estranged wife, Velva, with whom Ivens had two daughters.

According to media and court sources, Stouffer, then a 42-year-old computer sales consultant for a Houston firm, went to Ivens's home and told Ivens that his wife was in danger and he needed to borrow a gun. Ivens then loaned him a .38-caliber pistol. Upon receiving the pistol, Stouffer fired three shots at Ivens before he approached Reaves, who was asleep on the sofa, and fired twice at her head. The prosecution contended that Stouffer had planned to kill Ivens in order to obtain his $2 million life insurance.

Stouffer was arrested at his home on the same day. Although he initially denied involvement, he eventually admitted to shooting Ivens. In a phone conversation he made from Oklahoma County Jail, where he was remanded after being charged with the murder of Reaves and attempted murder of Ivens, Stouffer also told his girlfriend Velva, the estranged wife of Ivens, that he shot both Ivens and Reaves. The prosecution announced in May 1985 that they would seek the death penalty for Stouffer.

== Trial of Bigler Stouffer ==
On June 27, 1985, Bigler Stouffer stood trial for one count of murder and another of attempted murder at the Oklahoma County District Court. During the trial itself, Stouffer denied that he murdered Reaves and claimed that Reaves was already dead when he arrived at Ivens's and that he shot Ivens in self-defence while they were both fighting for the gun.

On July 1, 1985, after 90 minutes of deliberation, the jury found Stouffer guilty of all charges. On the same day, the jury deliberated for an additional two hours and recommended the death penalty for the charge of murder and a life sentence for the charge of attempted murder. On July 22, 1985, Oklahoma County District Judge Raymond Naifeh formally sentenced Stouffer to death for murdering Reaves, as well as life imprisonment for shooting Ivens.

The Oklahoma Court of Criminal Appeals dismissed an appeal by Stouffer in 1987. A subsequent appeal to the Oklahoma Court of Criminal Appeals was also rejected in 1991.

== Alleged murder-for-hire plot ==
While on death row for the murder of Linda Reaves, Bigler Stouffer was suspected to be the mastermind of a murder-for-hire plot to kill Douglas Ivens. In July 1986, a father-son pair – 58-year-old Billy Jack Blackstone and his 23-year-old son Richard Allen Blackstone – were arrested for attempting to kill Ivens and former gubernatorial candidate Ron Shotts. The Blackstones, who were allegedly involved in the murder of 34-year-old Peggy Gonzales, were said to have received orders from Stouffer to shoot and kill Ivens. Another death row inmate, Richard Norman Rojem Jr., who was found guilty of the 1984 rape-murder of his stepdaughter, was allegedly involved in the plot as well.

Stouffer was charged in May 1987 with soliciting the Blackstones to murder both Ivens and Shotts. The Blackstones, who were also charged in this case, agreed to testify against Stouffer, and Rojem similarly turned state’s evidence against Stouffer on the condition that he would not be charged as an accomplice of the plot.

On October 17, 1987, charges against Stouffer in connection with the alleged plot were dismissed by the Oklahoma County Special Judge Carolyn Ricks, after the prosecution requested for the dismissal on the grounds that the investigators failed to provide reliable evidence to prove Stouffer's involvement in the murder plot. The Blackstones, who were both sentenced to life imprisonment for the murder of Gonzales, pleaded guilty to attempting to kill Reaves and Shotts, and were each given consecutive terms of ten years in jail. The final alleged accomplice, Richard Rojem Jr., went on to become the longest-serving death row prisoner in Oklahoma before he was ultimately executed on June 27, 2024, 40 years after he killed his stepdaughter.

== Stouffer's re-trial ==
On January 15, 1999, Stouffer appealed to the 10th U.S. Circuit Court of Appeals on the grounds of ineffective counsel during his 1985 murder trial. The court agreed to grant him a re-hearing of his claims, which had been dismissed in a previous motion.

On July 31, 1999, U.S. District Judge Robin Cauthron ruled that Stouffer had indeed been represented by ineffective legal counsel and a re-trial should be granted to Stouffer, whose conviction and sentence for the shootings were overturned as a result of the ruling. In June 2000, the 10th U.S. Circuit Court of Appeals upheld Justice Cauthron's decision and directed that Stouffer should either be released or re-tried within 120 days after this ruling. Stouffer's re-trial for both the murder of Linda Reaves and attempted murder of Douglas Ivens began on January 21, 2003. Both Douglas Ivens, the sole survivor of the shootings, and his ex-wife Velva Ivens Pardee testified as witnesses in the re-trial.

On February 5, 2003, after eight hours of deliberation over two days, the jury found Stouffer guilty of murder and attempted murder.

Prior to Stouffer's sentencing, witnesses were called to testify before the trial court and jury, and the prosecution again sought the death penalty. Richard Blackstone, one of the two alleged hitmen sent by Stouffer to kill Ivens in 1986, testified about the alleged role played by Stouffer in the contract killing plot. Reaves's sister, who was by then the sole surviving member of Reaves's immediate family, testified about the sadness of losing her sister in such a horrific way. By contrast, friends and relatives of Stouffer testified that Stouffer was a spiritual man and a good son and asked for leniency.

On February 8, 2003, three days after finding Stouffer guilty of murder, the jury again sentenced him to death for murdering Reaves, and to life imprisonment for the charge of attempted murder.

== Further appeals ==
On November 15, 2006, the Oklahoma Court of Criminal Appeals rejected an appeal and upheld Stouffer’s conviction and sentence for the murder of Linda Reaves. Another appeal to the Oklahoma Court of Criminal Appeals was once again turned down on February 22, 2007.

In 2013, Stouffer appealed to the 10th U.S. Circuit Court of Appeals and asserted that jury tampering played a role in his re-trial and conviction. By 2016, the claims of jury tampering were rejected after the courts found there was no breach of Stouffer's rights to an impartial jury trial.

By 2017, Stouffer had exhausted all avenues of appeal (both state and federal) in his case, and became eligible for an execution date. As of February 2020, Stouffer was one of 26 death row prisoners in Oklahoma to exhaust all their appeals and awaiting their execution dates.

== Death warrants and final appeals ==
Two years before his first death sentence was overturned, Bigler Stouffer was originally scheduled to be executed on April 22, 1997, but the execution was delayed for unspecified reasons.

Stouffer’s execution was put on hold in 2014 when Oklahoma imposed a moratorium on capital punishment due to botched executions of Clayton Lockett and Charles Frederick Warner.

In August 2021, the Oklahoma attorney general John M. O'Connor applied to the Oklahoma Court of Criminal Appeals to schedule the execution dates of Stouffer and six other prisoners – Julius Jones, John Marion Grant, James Allen Coddington, Gilbert Ray Postelle, Wade Lay and Donald A. Grant – between October 2021 and February 2022. All seven were scheduled for clemency hearings 21 days before their respective execution dates. A month later, in September 2021, Stouffer's death warrant was approved and his execution date was slated for December 9, 2021. One of these seven inmates, John Grant, was subsequently executed on October 28, 2021, while another, Julius Jones, was granted clemency and his death sentence was commuted to life without parole hours before his scheduled execution on November 18, 2021.

On November 17, 2021, a five-member panel of the Oklahoma Pardon and Parole Board held a clemency hearing in Stouffer's case. Stouffer testified before the parole board that he was innocent and he claimed he never killed Reaves. He also said that he shot Ivens while they were both fighting over the gun. On the same day, the parole board voted 3–2 to recommend clemency for Stouffer despite the fact that most of the members were convinced of his guilt, because of their concerns with potential flaws in lethal injection executions in light of alleged complications of John Grant's execution the previous month.

Stouffer's son and pastor, together with their supporters, also pleaded for Stouffer to receive clemency and stated that they believed he was innocent. Despite the parole board's recommendation and these pleas, the final decision lay in the hands of Oklahoma state governor Kevin Stitt, who had the discretion to either reject Stouffer's clemency plea, or grant Stouffer clemency and commute his death sentence to life in prison without the possibility of parole. On December 3, 2021, six days before Stouffer's impending execution, Governor Stitt refused to grant clemency to Stouffer and ordered the execution to move forward.

In a final bid to evade execution, Stouffer, who continued to maintain his innocence, appealed for a stay of execution to challenge the lethal injection protocols of Oklahoma's death penalty laws. A federal district court in Oklahoma rejected the appeal on November 23, 2021, and the 10th U.S. Circuit Court of Appeals also rejected the appeal. Hours before his death sentence was carried out, the U.S. Supreme Court rejected Stouffer's final appeal to delay his execution.

== Execution ==
On December 9, 2021, 79-year-old Bigler Jobe Stouffer II was officially put to death via lethal injection at the Oklahoma State Penitentiary. Unlike the previous executions in Oklahoma, Stouffer's execution went smoothly, without any problems per the observations of the witnesses and officials present. In his last words, Stouffer continued to claim innocence in the murder of Linda Reaves and asked God to forgive his executioners. Prior to his execution, Stouffer told The Frontier in an interview that he found life without parole worse than death and he was thankful and at peace that his clemency was rejected.

Prior to his execution, Stouffer declined a special last meal, but he accepted a final meal of regular prison food, consisting of one chicken burger, two slices of bread, chips, broccoli, mixed fruit, two biscuits, a fruit drink and one bottle of water.

After Stouffer's death sentence was carried out, the surviving family members of Linda Reaves expressed their gratitude to Governor Kevin Stitt and Attorney General John M. O'Connor for allowing the execution to move forward. Reaves's cousin Rodney C. Thomson told reporters during a media conference that justice had prevailed after the family's long wait of 36 years for this outcome.

At the age of 79 years and two months old, Stouffer was the oldest person to be executed in Oklahoma, and the second-oldest executed in the U.S. after 83-year-old Walter Moody, who was convicted of murdering a federal judge with a mail bomb in 1989. Stouffer was also the second condemned criminal to be executed in Oklahoma after the state's resumption of executions in October 2021 two months earlier.

On February 16, 2022, two months after Stouffer was executed, an autopsy report revealed that Stouffer had fluid in his lungs, which supposedly caused Stouffer to experience drowning-like sensations during the execution procedure. The autopsy report also cited that Stouffer had pulmonary edema, which could result in a heavy sensation in the lungs and breathing difficulties, especially when lying down.

== See also ==
- Capital punishment in Oklahoma
- List of people executed in Oklahoma
- List of people executed in the United States in 2021

Executions carried out in Oklahoma
Preceded by John Grant October 28, 2021	Bigler Stouffer; December 9, 2021	Succeeded by Donald Anthony Grant January 27, 2022
Executions carried out in the United States
Preceded by David Neal Cox – Mississippi November 17, 2021	Bigler Stouffer – Oklahoma; December 9, 2021	Succeeded by Donald Anthony Grant – Oklahoma January 27, 2022
