= List of people executed in the United States in 2021 =

Eleven people, ten male and one female, were executed in the United States in 2021, all by lethal injection. With only eleven executions occurring throughout the year, 2021 saw the fewest number of executions within a single year since 1988.

== List of people executed in the United States in 2021 ==
No.	Date of execution	Name	Age of person			Gender	Ethnicity	State	Method	Ref.
No.	Date of execution	Name	At execution	At offense	Age difference	Gender	Ethnicity	State	Method	Ref.
1	January 13, 2021	Lisa Marie Montgomery	52	36	16	Female	White	Federal government	Lethal injection	
2	January 14, 2021	Corey Johnson	52	23	29	Male	Black	Federal government	Lethal injection	
3	January 16, 2021	Dustin John Higgs	48	23	25	Male	Black	Federal government	Lethal injection	
4	May 19, 2021	Quintin Phillippe Jones	41	20	21	Male	Black	Texas	Lethal injection	
5	June 30, 2021	John William Hummel	45	34	11	Male	White	Texas	Lethal injection	
6	September 28, 2021	Rick Allan Rhoades	57	27	30	Male	White	Texas	Lethal injection	
7	October 5, 2021	Ernest Lee Johnson	61	33	28	Male	Black	Missouri	Lethal injection	
8	October 21, 2021	Willie B. Smith III	52	22	30	Male	Black	Alabama	Lethal injection	
9	October 28, 2021	John Marion Grant	60	37	23	Male	Black	Oklahoma	Lethal injection	
10	November 17, 2021	David Neal Cox Sr.	50	39	11	Male	White	Mississippi	Lethal injection	
11	December 9, 2021	Bigler Jobe Stouffer II	79	42	37	Male	White	Oklahoma	Lethal injection	
		Average:	54 years	31 years	23 years					

== Demographics ==
Gender
Male	10	91%
Female	1	9%
Ethnicity
Black	6	55%
White	5	45%
State
Federal government	3	27%
Texas	3	27%
Oklahoma	2	18%
Alabama	1	9%
Mississippi	1	9%
Missouri	1	9%
Method
Lethal injection	11	100%
Month
January	3	27%
February	0	0%
March	0	0%
April	0	0%
May	1	9%
June	1	9%
July	0	0%
August	0	0%
September	1	9%
October	3	27%
November	1	9%
December	1	9%
Age
40–49	3	27%
50–59	5	45%
60–69	2	18%
70–79	1	9%
Total	11	100%

== Executions in recent years ==
Number of executions
2022	18
2021	11
2020	17
Total	46

== Canceled executions ==
A number of executions were canceled in 2021. Two executions in Tennessee were stayed indefinitely because of the COVID-19 pandemic. Three executions in Texas were also stayed to review intellectual disability claims. Five more executions in Texas were reprieved due to the state not allowing the inmate's pastors to lay their hands on them during the execution. Three executions in Ohio were reprieved due to the unofficial moratorium in place on capital punishment in Ohio by Governor Mike DeWine, due to problems in securing the drugs needed for lethal injections. All three of these executions were rescheduled for 2024, however all three were postponed again until 2027. An execution in Pennsylvania was also reprieved due to the moratorium in place on capital punishment in Pennsylvania by Governor Tom Wolf. The execution of Gerald Pizzuto in Idaho was stayed by the Idaho Commission of Pardons and Parole after they granted a request for a commutation hearing. Attorneys from both sides agreed to the stay of execution until the hearing concluded in November 2021.

Two execution dates of Freddie Eugene Owens and Brad Sigmon in South Carolina were stayed by the South Carolina Supreme Court because the state did not have a way of carrying out execution by firing squad at the time. The new capital punishment law in the state requires inmates to pick between the electric chair or firing squad. At the time, South Carolina had no way of executing inmates via firing squad, meaning the inmates had no choice but to be executed via electrocution. The court ruled the inmates must have the choice available to them before they can be executed. The execution of Zane Floyd in Nevada was stayed by a federal judge, who ruled that the state needed more time to determine the constitutionality of the lethal injection drugs that would be used for his execution. The execution of Julius Jones in Oklahoma was halted hours before he was due to be executed after his death sentence was commuted to life without the possibility of parole by Governor Kevin Stitt.

== See also ==
- List of death row inmates in the United States
- List of juveniles executed in the United States since 1976
- List of most recent executions by jurisdiction
- List of people executed by the United States federal government
- List of people executed in Texas, 2020–present
- List of women executed in the United States since 1976

Preceded by 2020	List of people executed in the United States in 2021	Succeeded by 2022
