= Murder of Layla Cummings =

1984 kidnapping, rape, and murder in the US

Layla Cummings
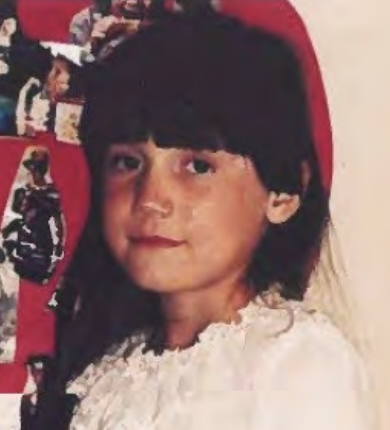
- Undated photo provided by the Oklahoma Attorney General's Office
- Born: Layla Dawn Marie Cummings; November 7, 1976; Oklahoma, U.S.
- Died: July 7, 1984 (aged 7); Elk City, Oklahoma, U.S.
- Cause of death: Homicide by stabbing
- Resting place: Fairlawn Cemetery
- Known for: Kidnapping, rape, & murder

On July 6, 1984, in Elk City, Oklahoma, 7-year-old Layla Dawn Marie Cummings (November 7, 1976 – July 7, 1984) was abducted, raped, and murdered by Richard Norman Rojem Jr., who was previously convicted and jailed for sex offenses. Rojem, who was formerly married to Cummings' mother before their divorce, was convicted of murdering Cummings and sentenced to death in 1985. Rojem, who failed in multiple attempts to overturn his death sentence, was incarcerated on death row for close to 39 years before he was executed via lethal injection on June 27, 2024, after the state parole board rejected his appeal for clemency.

== Murder ==
On July 6, 1984, at an apartment in Elk City, Oklahoma, 7-year-old Layla Dawn Marie Cummings, who was home alone with her brother, was kidnapped. The perpetrator was Richard Norman Rojem Jr., who had been previously married to her mother, who was out on a work shift at a fast food restaurant at the time of the incident.

Prior to abducting her, Rojem was previously convicted of raping two teenage girls in Macomb County, Michigan in 1978. Rojem, who faced three counts of criminal sexual conduct and one count of second-degree criminal sexual conduct, was sentenced to two concurrent sentences of six to 15 years imprisonment, but he served only four years before being released on parole. Rojem first met the brother of Cummings' mother, Mindy Cummings, while in prison, and he married her after his release. However, sources revealed that Rojem was sexually violent against Cummings' mother, and he did not have a good relationship overall with Cummings and her older brother. It was stated in court that Cummings had reported her then stepfather for sexual violence and it caused Rojem to be sent to prison for violating his parole order. Shortly before the abduction, Cummings' mother, who obtained a restraining order against Rojem, filed for divorce and it was granted in May 1984. Rojem was set free soon after, and he went on to kidnap the girl, supposedly out of vengeance.

The following morning after Rojem kidnapped Cummings, a farmer discovered the mutilated and partially-clad body of Cummings in a field near Burns Flat. An autopsy determined that Cummings died as a result of multiple stab wounds. The stab wounds were concentrated on the neck of Cummings, as well as on her vaginal area. It was also certified that Cummings had been raped before she was killed.

The police investigators were able to connect Rojem to the murder and arrested him as a suspect. Evidence showed that Rojem was aware of his ex-wife's work schedule and the lock to her apartment door was broken, presumably by Rojem when he broke into the apartment to abduct Cummings. Rojem's fingerprint was found on a cup discovered outside the girl's apartment and the cup itself belonged to a bar Rojem last patronised just before the abduction of Cummings. A condom wrapper found near the girl's body was connected to a used condom found in Rojem's bedroom at his place of residence. Tire marks belonging to the wheels of Rojem's vehicle were also found at the murder scene.

== Richard Rojem's trial and appeals ==
=== Original trial and sentencing ===
Richard Norman Rojem Jr.
- 2023 mugshot of Richard Rojem, who became Oklahoma's longest-serving death row inmate before his execution
- Born: December 19, 1957; Oklahoma, U.S.
- Died: June 27, 2024 (aged 66); Oklahoma State Penitentiary, Oklahoma, U.S.
- Cause of death: Execution by lethal injection
- Convictions: Michigan; Rape (×4); Oklahoma; First degree murder Rape; Kidnapping
- Penalty: Michigan; Six to 15 years' imprisonment Oklahoma; 1,000 years' imprisonment (rape); 1,000 years' imprisonment (kidnapping); Death (murder)

Details
- Victims: Layla Cummings, 7 Two adolescent rape victims (unnamed)
- Date: Michigan; 1978; Oklahoma; July 6–7, 1984
- Locations: 1978; Macomb County, Michigan; 1984; Washita County, Oklahoma
- Imprisoned at: Oklahoma State Penitentiary

Richard Rojem, who was remanded without bail at the Beckham County Jail, was charged on July 28, 1984, for the abduction, rape, and murder of Layla Cummings. Prosecutors expressed their intent to seek the death penalty for Rojem on the charge of murder, which carried either a death sentence or life imprisonment within Oklahoma's state jurisdiction.

On June 1, 1985, Rojem, who stood trial before a jury in the Washita County District Court, was found guilty of kidnapping, raping, and murdering Cummings after the jury spent 45 minutes to deliberate over the verdict. The same jury recommended a jail term of 1,000 years each for the charges of kidnapping and rape, but for the most serious charge of murder, the death penalty was meted out to Rojem. Official sentencing took place on July 11, 1985, and Rojem was formally sentenced to death for the murder of Layla Cummings.

On March 23, 1988, by a majority decision of two to one, the Oklahoma Court of Criminal Appeals rejected Rojem's appeal and upheld his death sentence and murder conviction.

=== Re-sentencing bids in the 2000s ===
On March 31, 2001, 15 years after he was first sent to death row, the 10th U.S. Circuit Court of Appeals unanimously overturned Rojem's death sentence and ordered that he should undergo a re-sentencing trial. The appellate court ruled that the trial judge violated Rojem's constitutional rights because the jury was misdirected by the judge, who did not ask them to consider the mitigating factors against the aggravating circumstances when deciding on the sentence. A new jury trial would take place in relation to Rojem's re-sentencing and the prosecution sought the death penalty for Rojem once again.

Rojem, who was granted DNA testing during his re-sentencing trial, was once again sentenced to death in 2003.

Three years later, in 2006, Rojem's second death sentence was once again vacated by the higher courts due to procedural and trial errors, including the failure to dismiss three jurors for cause. Rojem's second re-sentencing trial began in May 2007, and during that same year, Rojem was sentenced to death for the third time by a Custer County jury.

Unlike all his previous legal attempts, Rojem failed all of his appeals against the third death sentence. The Oklahoma Court of Criminal Appeals rejected the appeal in 2009, on the grounds that Rojem's death sentence was "factually substantiated and appropriate" in spite of some errors in the 2007 re-sentencing hearing. In January 2010, the U.S. Supreme Court ultimately rejected Rojem's appeal and confirmed the death sentence.

By 2017, Rojem's final appeal was dismissed, with the U.S. Supreme Court refusing to review his death sentence, making him the 16th condemned inmate to exhaust all avenues of appeal in Oklahoma's death row. At that point, a moratorium was imposed on Oklahoma's impending executions since 2015, after it was found that the wrong drug was administered to convicted murderer Charles Frederick Warner when he was executed via lethal injection on January 15, 2015.

As of February 2020, Rojem was one of 26 inmates eligible for execution after exhausting all available appeals against the conviction and sentence.

== Death row and execution ==
For the next four decades after his first sentencing trial, Richard Rojem remained on death row while appealing against his death sentence.

During his time on death row, Rojem had a history of violence behind bars and was disciplined for misconduct at least eight times, often for defiant behavior against the prison staff and assaulting other people. In 2020, he was recorded by the prison for illegally possessing sharp weapons in jail.

In 1987, Rojem was also identified as a suspect behind the hiring of hitmen to kill the witnesses in the case against Bigler Stouffer, another death row inmate convicted of murdering a schoolteacher in 1985. Rojem was not charged in this case as he agreed to testify against Stouffer in this case. Stouffer was eventually executed on December 9, 2021, becoming the oldest person put to death in Oklahoma at age 79.

Rojem came close to being executed more than once before his death sentence was ultimately carried out in 2024. The first time happened in 1993, when the state authorities applied for the scheduling of Rojem's execution date and five other prisoners. Rojem's first death warrant slated his execution date as August 6, 1993. However, it was delayed, and another death warrant was subsequently issued in October 1993, with Rojem's execution date rescheduled as February 15, 1994. The execution date was ultimately staved off for unknown reasons.

In August 2022, two months after a death row inmate's failed legal challenge against the constitutionality of Oklahoma's execution protocols, Rojem was one of the 25 inmates who had their execution dates scheduled after their avenues of appeal were all exhausted. Rojem's execution date was slated as October 5, 2023. However, it was delayed for presumed legal reasons.

In January 2024, Rojem was one of the six inmates whose executions would take place every 90 days apart from each other, after a legal motion was filed in Oklahoma state courts to authorize new death warrants for the six inmates on the list.

In May 2024, a new death warrant was issued for Rojem, and Rojem's execution was rescheduled to take place on June 27, 2024.

The Oklahoma Pardon and Parole Board conducted a clemency hearing for Rojem in mid-June 2024. Rojem maintained his innocence and insisted he never killed his stepdaughter throughout the hearing and asked for mercy, and his lawyers also implored the parole board to commute his death sentence to life in prison without the possibility of parole. Under Oklahoma state law, the governor of Oklahoma had the discretion to grant clemency to a death row prisoner upon the parole board's recommendation to grant clemency, but no clemency would be given if the parole board rejected the clemency plea. Layla Cummings' mother and surviving family members urged the parole board to not grant Rojem clemency, stating that the family was still struggling with the pain and grief of losing Cummings 40 years ago.

On June 18, 2024, nine days before the date of Rojem's impending execution, the parole board unanimously refused to recommend clemency for Rojem via a vote of five to zero. Attorney General Gentner Drummond applauded the parole board's decision, stating that Rojem, whom he described as a "monster who savagely raped and murdered an innocent child", did not deserve clemency and justice would be fully served once the execution went ahead. During the final days leading up to the execution, Rojem did not file any last-minute appeals to further delay his execution, and a vigil attended by death penalty opponents was scheduled to take place outside the governor's mansion in Oklahoma City and the prison where Rojem's execution would take place.

On June 27, 2024, nearly 40 years after murdering 7-year-old Layla Cummings, 66-year-old Richard Norman Rojem Jr. was formally put to death via lethal injection at Oklahoma State Penitentiary. When asked if he had any last words, Rojem said, "I don't. I've said my goodbyes." Rojem was pronounced dead at 10:16 a.m. after one dose of midazolam and other drugs were separately administered to him on the gurney. Rojem's execution was Oklahoma's 13th documented execution after the 2021 resumption of executions in Oklahoma.

For his last meal, Rojem ordered a small Little Caesars's pizza with double cheese and double pepperoni, eight salt packets, eight crushed red pepper packets, a bottle of ginger ale, a Styrofoam cup and two vanilla ice cream cups.

According to the Oklahoma Department of Corrections, Richard Rojem was the state's longest-serving death row prisoner at the time of his execution.

== Aftermath ==
In the aftermath, Layla Cummings' mother and brother moved to Portland, Oregon, where the former volunteered with a charity foundation aimed to help children who dealt with grief and loss. Cummings' mother later moved back to Oklahoma, where she dedicated herself to charity to contribute to aiding the welfare of families who lost their loved ones to murder, and also took part in charity efforts when the 1995 Oklahoma City bombing took place.

In response to Rojem's eventual execution, Cummings' surviving family members all welcomed the outcome, stating that justice had been served. Cummings' mother stated that Layla never got to live the life she should have had after everything was stolen from her on that fateful night when she was murdered. Cummings' aunt, whose brother was the girl's biological father, said that the rejection of clemency was a sign of healing and justice for the family. She revealed that Cummings' father died 14 months after the murder, and she felt weary for maintaining the efforts to keep Rojem in jail for murdering her niece and patiently waited for 40 years to see him executed for the crime. Oklahoma's Attorney General Gentner Drummond similarly concurred with the stance of Cummings' family, stating that Rojem deserved the same absence of mercy he demonstrated to Cummings when he murdered her in cold blood back in 1984. However, some opposed to the execution of Rojem, and several people, including former death row inmate Paris Powell, protested outside the mansion of the Oklahoma governor against the execution.

== See also ==
- Capital punishment in Oklahoma
- List of people executed in Oklahoma
- List of people executed in the United States in 2024

Executions carried out in Oklahoma
Preceded by Michael Dewayne Smith April 4, 2024	Richard Norman Rojem Jr. June 27, 2024	Succeeded by Emmanuel Antonia Littlejohn September 26, 2024
Executions carried out in the United States
Preceded by Ramiro Felix Gonzales – Texas June 26, 2024	Richard Norman Rojem Jr. – Oklahoma; June 27, 2024	Succeeded by Keith Edmund Gavin – Alabama July 18, 2024
