= Scott Carpenter (murderer) =

American murderer (1975–1997)

Scott Dawn Carpenter
- Born: January 2, 1975; United States
- Died: May 8, 1997 (aged 22); Oklahoma State Penitentiary, Oklahoma, U.S.
- Known for: Youngest person executed in the United States since 1976 and by lethal injection
- Status: Executed by lethal injection
- Conviction: First degree murder
- Penalty: Death (December 16, 1994)

Scott Dawn Carpenter (January 2, 1975 – May 8, 1997) was a convicted American murderer. At the age of 22, he was the youngest person to be executed in the United States after capital punishment was reaffirmed by the United States Supreme Court by a 7–2 decision in the Gregg v. Georgia in 1976 and the youngest person to be executed by lethal injection.

== Crime ==
On February 6, 1994, Carpenter filled his pickup truck with $37 worth of gasoline, then went into a convenience store, where he placed a sandwich, soft drink, and chewing tobacco near the cash register. He then proceeded to stab the store owner, 56-year-old A.J. Kelley, in the back and neck. Kelley's body was found in the minnow room of the convenience store, which was located near Lake Eufaula in eastern Oklahoma. Investigators speculated Carpenter said he wanted to buy some bait, then followed Kelley to the room and murdered him. He was interrupted as two men, one of them a retired Oklahoma City police detective, entered the store. They gave chase out of the store, then wrote down the car's license tag number as Carpenter drove away. He was apprehended one hour later.

== Trial ==
Carpenter pleaded no contest to one charge of first degree murder and asked for the death penalty, stating that he saw no future in spending the "next 60 or 70 years of my life behind bars." Carpenter had no prior criminal record, and was subsequently sentenced to death by lethal injection. He did not appeal his sentence.

== Execution ==
Carpenter talked to his mother for 80 minutes prior to the execution. His last meal consisted of barbecued beef ribs, corn on the cob, baked beans, potato salad, hot rolls, sweetened lemonade and pecan pie with whipped topping. Before being put to death, he made a final statement: "I tell the young and old, do not stray onto the wrong path in life as I did. I speak from experience when I say it's a long and bumpy road, with a lot of regret and few second chances." In a separate letter, he also apologized to the family of the victim. Carpenter was pronounced dead some 11 minutes after the lethal injection was administered. As the drugs took effect, Carpenter began to gasp and shake. This was followed by a guttural sound, multiple spasms, and gasps for air until his body stopped moving, three minutes later. The warden later said that Carpenter's young age, large body frame, and strong heart were likely the cause.

== See also ==
- Capital punishment in Oklahoma
- Capital punishment in the United States
- List of people executed in Oklahoma
- List of people executed in the United States in 1997
- Volunteer (capital punishment)
