= Wendell Grissom =

American murderer (1968–2025)

- 2023 mugshot of Grissom
- Born: October 11, 1968; Fort Cobb, Oklahoma, U.S.
- Died: March 20, 2025 (aged 56); Oklahoma State Penitentiary, Oklahoma, U.S.
- Motive: Robbery
- Convictions: First-degree murder, shooting with intent to kill, grand larceny, unlawful possession of a firearm
- Penalty: Death
- Accomplice: Jessie Floyd Johns

Details
- Country: United States
- State: Fort Cobb, Oklahoma
- Killed: Amber Matthews
- Injured: Dreu Kopf
- Weapons: .22 caliber derringer.44 caliber black powder pistol
- Imprisoned at: Oklahoma State Penitentiary

Wendell Arden Grissom (October 11, 1968 – March 20, 2025) was an American man convicted and executed for the November 2005 murder of 23-year-old Amber Dawn Matthews (October 19, 1982 – November 3, 2005) during a home invasion in Watonga, Oklahoma. Grissom, along with accomplice Jessie Floyd Johns, broke into a home occupied by Matthews, her friend Dreu Kopf, and two children. Kopf was shot multiple times but survived, while Matthews was fatally shot at close range. Grissom was arrested days later, convicted of first-degree murder, and sentenced to death in 2008.

During Wendell Grissom's trial, the prosecution highlighted the crime's severity, describing Amber Matthews' killing as intentional and unprovoked. The defense acknowledged Grissom's role, mentioning alcohol use and possible neurological issues as factors. The jury found Grissom guilty of first-degree murder and suggested a death sentence. His co-defendant, Jessie Floyd Johns, received life imprisonment without parole.

After his conviction, Grissom's case gained new attention due to medical evaluations showing neurological impairments not presented during the trial. His legal team cited this evidence and his remorseful statements in a clemency petition. Some original jurors submitted affidavits suggesting this information might have affected their sentencing. The Oklahoma Pardon and Parole Board rejected the petition 4–1, and Governor Kevin Stitt did not intervene.

Grissom was executed by lethal injection on March 20, 2025, at the Oklahoma State Penitentiary in McAlester. In his final remarks, Grissom apologized to the victim's family and expressed remorse.

== Early life ==
Wendell Arden Grissom was born on October 11, 1968, in Fort Cobb, Oklahoma, a small town in Caddo County. He grew up in a low-income household, facing challenges such as limited educational access and early exposure to substance use. His legal representatives and advocates noted signs of developmental and behavioral issues in childhood, though these were neither formally diagnosed nor treated.

During his adolescence, Grissom struggled academically and left school without finishing high school. Court records and clemency documents indicate he started using alcohol and other substances as a teenager. This substance use persisted into adulthood, linked to issues with impulse control, decision-making, and social functioning.

Before the 2005 offense resulting in his death sentence, Grissom had several arrests and incarcerations for nonviolent crimes. Mitigation specialists in his post-conviction appeals noted signs of cognitive impairment and possible neurological dysfunction before his arrest. They suggested these conditions, undiagnosed due to limited access to early psychological or medical evaluation, may have influenced his later behavior and criminal involvement.

== Crime ==
On the evening of November 3, 2005, Grissom and an accomplice, Jessie Floyd Johns, drove through Blaine County, Oklahoma, with the intention of committing a burglary. They selected a residence in Watonga that was occupied by 23-year-old Amber Matthews, her friend Dreu Kopf, and Kopf's two young children. According to prosecutors, the residence was chosen at random based on the perceived likelihood of finding money or valuables.

Grissom and Johns entered the residence through an unlocked back door and confronted the occupants while armed. Grissom shot Dreu Kopf multiple times in the chest, back, and arm as she tried to flee with her children. Despite severe injuries, Kopf reached a neighbor's house and called emergency services. Law enforcement later noted that her actions were key to ensuring her children's safety.

Following the shooting of Kopf, Grissom moved through the residence and found Amber Matthews hiding in a bedroom. He then shot her at close range, killing her instantly. Investigators found no evidence that Matthews resisted or posed any threat. Prosecutors argued that the act was a calculated use of deadly force intended to eliminate a potential witness.

Grissom and Johns fled the scene in a vehicle owned by Dreu Kopf, which was later found abandoned elsewhere. Their arrests followed shortly, based on statements from Kopf and forensic evidence at the scene, including fingerprint and ballistic analyses. Both were charged with multiple felonies, including first-degree murder, attempted murder, burglary, and unlawful possession of a firearm by a convicted felon.

Later investigations showed Grissom had consumed alcohol before the offense, a point his defense team raised as a mitigating factor affecting his behavior. Prosecutors, however, contended that Amber Matthews' killing was intentional and premeditated. The violence's severity and its ongoing impact on surviving victims were central issues in both the trial and sentencing.

== Trial and conviction ==
In late 2005, Wendell Grissom was charged in Blaine County District Court with several criminal offenses, including first-degree murder, shooting with intent to kill, grand larceny, and unlawful possession of a firearm by a convicted felon. His co-defendant, Jessie Floyd Johns, faced comparable charges but was sentenced to life imprisonment without the possibility of parole after entering into a plea agreement.

Grissom's trial began in 2008. While his defense did not dispute his role in the incident, they maintained that the killing of Amber Matthews was not premeditated. The defense cited longstanding alcohol use and potential undiagnosed neurological issues as mitigating factors, requesting a sentence of life imprisonment rather than capital punishment. The prosecution, by contrast, argued that the shooting was intentional, noting that Matthews was killed at close range after another individual had fled the scene, and that there was no indication she had provoked the attack.

The jury found Grissom guilty on all counts and recommended the death penalty for the murder of Amber Matthews. He was formally sentenced to death by lethal injection and transferred to Oklahoma State Penitentiary in McAlester. At the time of sentencing, no medical or psychological evidence concerning possible brain damage or developmental disability was presented in court, a point that would later become central to post-conviction appeals.

Grissom's appeals over the years focused largely on procedural issues and ineffective assistance of counsel. His legal team later argued that his trial attorneys failed to conduct thorough neurological evaluations that could have revealed brain damage affecting his decision-making. Despite these claims, state and federal courts upheld his conviction and death sentence, stating that the evidence against him was overwhelming and that the defense had made a strategic decision to focus on remorse rather than mental health.

== Clemency proceedings ==
In the months before his scheduled execution, Wendell Grissom's legal team submitted a clemency petition, claiming his original trial lacked evidence of neurological impairments. In January 2025, they filed an application with the Oklahoma Pardon and Parole Board, supported by medical records and expert assessments showing brain atrophy in areas affecting decision-making and impulse control. A clemency hearing took place on February 5, 2025, where his attorneys argued that Grissom had not received a thorough neuropsychological assessment during the trial and that these impairments might have impacted his behavior. The defense also provided statements from several 2008 sentencing jurors, who said knowledge of his cognitive issues could have led them to favor a life sentence over death penalty.

Despite the presentation of new medical evidence and statements from former jurors, the Oklahoma Pardon and Parole Board voted 4–1 against recommending clemency. Oklahoma attorney general Gentner Drummond opposed the request, describing the case as a "textbook example of why the death penalty exists" and asserting that Grissom's conduct during the 2005 incident was intentional and premeditated. Following the board's recommendation, Governor Kevin Stitt declined to grant clemency.

Grissom's case drew attention from national advocacy organizations such as Fair and Just Prosecution and the Death Penalty Information Center, which issued statements opposing the denial of clemency. These groups raised concerns about the execution of individuals with documented neurological impairments and questioned whether the clemency process adequately reflected contemporary standards regarding the application of capital punishment.

== Execution ==
Grissom was executed by lethal injection on the morning of March 20, 2025, at the Oklahoma State Penitentiary in McAlester. The execution began at approximately 10:00 a.m., and Grissom was pronounced dead at 10:13 a.m. local time. His execution marked Oklahoma's first of the year and the state's 128th since capital punishment resumed in 1976.

"I don't know what made me do what I did," Grissom said in his confession to police. ... "I never done anything like this in my life ... I have no explanation."

— Grissom Last Words

In his final statement, Grissom apologized to the family of Amber Matthews, the woman he killed during the 2005 home invasion. He expressed remorse for his actions and claimed that he was heavily intoxicated at the time of the crime, saying, "I was drunk. I was high. I was out of my mind." He also offered forgiveness to others and asked for peace in his final moments. Observers noted that he remained calm during the procedure and showed no visible signs of distress.

Among those who witnessed the execution were Dreu Kopf—the surviving victim of the shooting—members of the Matthews family, state officials, and members of the media. Kopf later spoke to reporters, stating that although she believed Grissom's apology was sincere, it came too late. She stated that she still bears physical and emotional scars from the attack, highlighting the lasting impact on her and her children.

== See also ==
- Capital punishment in Oklahoma
- List of people executed in Oklahoma
- List of people executed in the United States in 2025

Executions carried out in Oklahoma
Preceded by Kevin Ray Underwood December 19, 2024	Wendell Grissom; March 20, 2025	Succeeded by John Hanson June 12, 2025
Executions carried out in the United States
Preceded by Aaron Gunches – Arizona March 19, 2025	Wendell Grissom – Oklahoma; March 20, 2025	Succeeded by Eddie James – Florida March 20, 2025
