= Kevin Underwood =

American murderer (1979–2024)

Kevin Ray Underwood
- 2021 mug shot of Underwood
- Born: December 19, 1979; Purcell, Oklahoma, U.S.
- Died: December 19, 2024 (aged 45); Oklahoma State Penitentiary, Oklahoma, U.S.
- Status: Executed by lethal injection
- Motive: Vorarephilia
- Conviction: First degree murder
- Penalty: Death

Details
- Victims: Jamie Rose Bolin, 10
- Date: April 12, 2006
- Locations: Purcell, Oklahoma

Kevin Ray Underwood (December 19, 1979 – December 19, 2024) was an American convicted murderer who was sentenced to death for the murder of 10-year-old Jamie Rose Bolin (August 7, 1995 – April 12, 2006) in Purcell, Oklahoma. On April 12, 2006, Underwood beat, suffocated, and sexually assaulted Bolin before attempting to behead and eat her body. Underwood was given the death sentence following his 2008 conviction and was executed on December 19, 2024.

== Crimes ==
Underwood lived in the same apartment complex as Jamie and her father located in Purcell, Oklahoma.

On April 12, 2006, according to Underwood's account, Bolin had walked home from school after a school event, and her father was not home at the time due to his late working hours. Underwood intercepted her and lured her into his apartment under the promise of playing with his pet rat. He then turned on SpongeBob SquarePants on the TV for her to watch. Then, in a sudden attack, he hit her on the back of the head several times with a wooden cutting board. Following this, he suffocated Bolin with his hands. He told the agents that approximately fifteen to twenty minutes had passed before she died. He then attempted to rape Bolin's body but was unable to perform sexually. He then moved her to the bathtub and tried to decapitate her with a knife but was unsuccessful. He wrapped Bolin's body in plastic sheeting and placed it in a large plastic container, which he hid in his closet. He also dismantled Bolin's bicycle and hid it inside his apartment to make it look like she had left the apartment complex.

Police searched for Bolin after she failed to return home to the apartment shared with her father, Curtis Bolin. The search ended on April 14, 2006, two days after her father realized she was gone and 24 hours after local authorities issued an Amber alert. Police identified Underwood as the girl's neighbor and likely one of the last people to see her. Without a warrant being issued, he consented to a search of his apartment. Underwood remained calm until police noticed a plastic storage tub, sealed with duct tape, in his bedroom closet. Underwood explained that the tub was sealed to keep moisture from damaging the comic books inside.

FBI agents also found a disassembled purple bike, meat tenderizer, and skewers. "Go ahead and arrest me… She's in there. I hit her and chopped her up", Underwood said. He stated, "I'm going to burn in Hell", as he began hyperventilating and was visibly upset. An autopsy showed her throat had been cut from ear to ear, but otherwise, her body was intact. The autopsy report said Bolin probably died of a lack of oxygen.

He confessed he had prepared for months to carry out his sexual and cannibalistic fantasies. He said he chose Bolin because she was a convenient victim. In his confession, he said his original plan was to cut off his victim's head and set it on his desk "so it could like watch me". He said he wanted to keep the corpse in his bed, "sleeping with it and having sex with it for a day or two" before butchering and cooking it.

== Trial and appeals ==
On February 29, 2008, a jury found him guilty of first-degree murder. A jury recommended the death penalty on March 7, 2008.

On April 3, 2008, McClain County District Judge Candace Blalock approved the recommended death sentence. Underwood attempted to appeal his sentence because it would be an unconstitutionally cruel and unusual punishment due to his mental illness (he was initially diagnosed with schizotypal personality disorder at his trial but was later diagnosed with Asperger syndrome). An Oklahoma City federal judge rejected the appeal. On February 29, 2008, a jury found him guilty of first-degree murder after deliberating for 23 minutes. This quick verdict is attributed to the showing of Underwood's videotaped confession. "I wanted to know what it tasted like, and just the thought of eating someone was appealing to me", Underwood said in the confession. A jury recommended the death penalty on March 7, 2008. On April 3, 2008, McClain County District Judge Candace Blalock approved the recommended death sentence.

On July 1, 2022, Underwood was one of 25 death row inmates to be scheduled for execution in Oklahoma. He was initially scheduled to be executed on December 7, 2023. His execution was later postponed due to a request by Oklahoma Attorney General Gentner Drummond, who asked for sixty days between executions rather than thirty "to alleviate the burden on DOC personnel".

On October 1, 2024, Underwood's second death warrant was released, and he was scheduled for execution on December 19, 2024, his 45th birthday.

Underwood's clemency hearing was originally supposed to happen on December 4, 2024. However it was cancelled due to Oklahoma Pardon and Parole Board losing two of its five voting members. After another cancelled clemency hearing that was supposed to happen on December 9, the clemency hearing eventually took place on December 13, 2024. During the clemency hearing Underwood expressed remorse for the murder of Jamie Rose Bolin, stating: "I recognize that although I do not want to die… I deserve to for what I did", he said in a tearful two-minute statement at his clemency hearing. "And if my death could… change what I did, I would gladly die". The board voted 3–0 against recommending clemency. Attorney General Gentner Drummond and his assistants told the board Underwood's crimes "remain some of the most depraved and notorious in Oklahoma history".

== Execution ==
On the morning of December 19, 2024, Underwood was executed via lethal injection at the Oklahoma State Penitentiary. He was pronounced dead at 10:14 a.m. His last meal consisted of chicken-fried steak, mashed potatoes with gravy, a cheeseburger with french fries and ketchup, pinto beans, a hot roll and a cola drink from the prison canteen. In his final statement, he said, "The decision to execute me on my birthday and six days before Christmas was a needlessly cruel thing to do to my family, but I'm very sorry for what I did, and I wish I could take it back." He was reportedly crying silently during his execution.

== See also ==
- List of people executed in Oklahoma
- List of people executed in the United States in 2024

Executions carried out in Oklahoma
Preceded by Emmanuel Littlejohn September 26, 2024	Kevin Ray Underwood; December 19, 2024	Succeeded by Wendell Grissom March 20, 2025
Executions carried out in the United States
Preceded by Joseph Corcoran – Indiana December 18, 2024	Kevin Ray Underwood – Oklahoma; December 19, 2024	Succeeded by Marion Bowman Jr. – South Carolina January 31, 2025
