= Murder of Albert Hale =

1997 killing of a 73-year-old man in Oklahoma

Albert Hale
- Born: March 13, 1923; Woolsey, Washington County, Arkansas, U.S.
- Died: March 6, 1997 (aged 73); Oklahoma City, Oklahoma, U.S.
- Resting place: Elmwood Cemetery
- Known for: Victim of a 1997 murder case

On March 6, 1997, 73-year-old Albert Troy Hale (March 13, 1923 – March 6, 1997) was attacked and murdered by a friend in his house at Oklahoma City over Hale's refusal to give his friend money to buy cocaine. The killer, James Allen Coddington (March 22, 1972 – August 25, 2022), was charged and convicted of the murder, and sentenced to death in 2003. After exhausting all his appeals (which ended in failure) and losing his clemency plea, Coddington, whose death sentence was overturned in 2006 before it was restored in 2008, was executed via lethal injection on August 25, 2022.

== Murder ==
On March 6, 1997, a 73-year-old man was attacked and killed by his friend inside his home at Oklahoma City.

On the day in question, Albert Troy Hale was accompanied by his 24-year-old friend and co-worker James Allen Coddington, who had a history of cocaine abuse, and both Hale and Coddington, who had a close friendship, were in the living room watching television when Coddington asked to borrow money from Hale to buy drugs. Earlier on that day, Coddington had robbed a convenience store to get money to buy drugs, but he did not have enough money to get enough cocaine to feed his drug addiction, which returned a few days before due to a relapse.

Reportedly, Hale refused to lend Coddington money, and advised him to not continue consuming drugs. Coddington was said to have been angered by the rejection, and just when he was about to leave, Coddington grabbed a claw hammer and wielded it at Hale, battering the elderly man to death by inflicting three to four blows to the head.

After the act was done, Coddington stole a sum of US$520 from Hale's home and fled the scene; the body of Hale was later discovered by one of his sons. Coddington would later go on to rob at least six separate gas stations and convenience stores before he was finally arrested for the killing of Hale.

== Trial of James Coddington ==
James Coddington

Born on March 22, 1972, James Allen Coddington came from a family of nine children, and when he was a toddler, Coddington's mother went to prison for an unspecified offence for nearly the first eight years of Coddington's life. Coddington's father, who took care of Coddington during his wife's incarceration, was reportedly an alcoholic who often put alcohol inside the baby bottles of Coddington, and he also severely abused Coddington, beating him and sometimes drawing blood. Coddington's father would often spend the money received from welfare assistance on alcohol, forcing Coddington and his siblings to live off scraps from the dumpster outside fast food restaurants. Later, Coddington's father abandoned him when he was seven, and Coddington, who was placed under foster care, gradually went astray and got addicted to drugs from a young age. Before his involvement in the murder, Coddington has five other felony convictions from 1990 and 1991 on charges of burglary and unauthorized use of a motor vehicle.

A day after he murdered Albert Hale, on March 7, 1997, James Coddington was arrested for the murder of Albert Hale, and charged for the crime.

Six years after his arrest, on April 24, 2003, Coddington stood trial for the murder of Albert Hale. Prior to his 2003 trial for murder, Coddington was first tried and convicted of six separate robbery cases, and sentenced to six consecutive life sentences on November 26, 1997.

On April 29, 2003, Coddington was found guilty of murder in the first degree by an Oklahoma County jury.

On May 2, 2003, the same jury recommended the death penalty for Coddington, who was formally sentenced to death in a subsequent formal court session.

== Re-sentencing bid and appeals ==
On August 16, 2006, James Coddington's appeal was granted by the Oklahoma Court of Criminal Appeals, which ordered Coddington's death sentence to be set aside and sent the case back to the lower courts for re-sentencing, after they found that the videotaped testimony of Coddington's mother Gayla Hood should have been admitted during the trial and the exclusion of this crucial evidence hindered the jury from making due consideration to decide on his sentence, and was constitutionally unfair for Coddington.

A re-sentencing trial by jury was conducted two years later before a different jury in an Oklahoma County courtroom. After hearing all the evidence, on June 16, 2008, the jury of seven men and five women deliberated for more than four hours before they returned with their verdict, once again recommending the death penalty for Coddington, a decision which Hale's son Mitch described as a sign of justice for his late father.

On July 2, 2008, Coddington was re-sentenced to death during a formal court hearing, in which he apologized to the Hale family once again and sought forgiveness for murdering Hale back in 1997. Hale's grandson and son had declined to come to court, but Hale's daughter and son-in-law were present to hear the verdict.

On August 23, 2011, Coddington's death sentence appeal was dismissed by the Oklahoma Court of Criminal Appeals.

On May 12, 2020, the 10th Circuit Court of Appeals rejected an appeal from Coddington.

On June 8, 2021, The Oklahoman reported that Coddington lost his final appeal to the U.S. Supreme Court, which effectively made him eligible to be executed on a date to be determined.

Coddington was one of 28 death row inmates in Oklahoma who filed a lawsuit against the state over Oklahoma's execution protocol, and the lawsuit was dismissed in June 2022 after the courts ruled that there was no breach of constitutionality in the death penalty laws of Oklahoma.

== Clemency bid and execution ==
=== Death warrants and clemency hearing ===
In August 2021, two months after losing his final appeal, James Coddington was one of seven inmates whose execution dates were pending approval by the Oklahoma Court of Criminal Appeals, after the Oklahoma attorney general applied for the seven to be executed between October 2021 and February 2022. A month later, in September 2021, the court granted the attorney general's motion, scheduling Coddington to be executed on March 10, 2022, but on account of another pending lawsuit where Coddington was involved, the execution date itself was pushed back after U.S. District Court Judge Stephen P. Friot granted Coddington's appeal in December 2021 for a stay of execution.

On July 1, 2022, the Oklahoma Court of Criminal Appeals scheduled the execution dates of 25 death row prisoners, all of whom had exhausted their appeals against their sentences, over a 29-month period. Coddington was the first on the list, with his execution tentatively rescheduled to take place on August 25, 2022. Coddington and the next six inmates on the list were allowed to participate in clemency hearings during the last few weeks before their executions; Coddington's clemency hearing before the Oklahoma Pardon and Parole Board was scheduled on July 26, 2022.

After the announcement of Coddington's execution date, a clemency campaign was conducted to plead for mercy on the life of Coddington. Supporters of Coddington, including his lawyers and opponents of capital punishment, argued that Coddington should not be executed on humanitarian grounds, given that Coddington had a troubled childhood and was born to an alcoholic father and a mother who was in prison when he was a toddler, and the trauma and tragedy from Coddington's early life had a negative influence on him, and he had reformed himself while in prison, a testament to his remorse for the murder of Albert Hale back in 1997. However, the family of Hale urge the authorities to not spare Coddington the death sentence, and Attorney General John M. O'Connor also expressed his support for Coddington's impending execution. Evidence adduced during his clemency hearing showed that Coddington maintained a clean disciplinary record during his incarceration on death row, and he not only tried staying away from drugs but also studied and earned his GED, which the parole board noted were immense efforts done by Coddington to rehabilitate himself.

On August 3, 2022, three weeks before he was to be executed, the parole board, by a majority vote of 3–2, recommended that Coddington should receive clemency from the governor. If the recommendation was accepted by the Oklahoma governor Kevin Stitt, Coddington's death sentence would be commuted to life in prison without the possibility of parole. Prior to this, Governor Stitt had only granted clemency once, to former death row inmate Julius Jones, reducing his death sentence for a businessman's murder to life without parole hours before his scheduled execution on November 18, 2021. Stitt had also once refused to lower the death sentence of convicted killer Bigler Stouffer despite a recommendation for clemency, leading to Stouffer's execution on December 9, 2021.

On August 24, 2022, the eve of his execution, Coddington's clemency petition was rejected by Governor Stitt, who allowed the execution to move forward.

=== Execution and final statement ===
On August 25, 2022, 50-year-old James Allen Coddington was formally put to death via lethal injection at Oklahoma State Penitentiary. Before he was executed, Coddington, who was pronounced dead at 10:16 a.m., was allowed to say his final words:

"To all my family and friends, lawyers, everyone who’s been around me and loved me, thank you. Gov. Stitt, I don’t blame you and I forgive you."

Mitch Hale, one of Hale's sons, stated that he did not find any joy in witnessing the execution of his father's murderer, but he found peace with the fact that Coddington's death sentence was carried out and the family could finally move on after putting the painful chapter to a close. Mitch also stated that he did not believe Coddington was truly remorseful for murdering his father, as Coddington never once apologized or mentioned Hale in his final statement.

Prior to the execution, Coddington reportedly ordered a final meal of two cheeseburgers, two crunchy fish sandwiches, two large fries and a large soda.

Coddington was the fifth prisoner from Oklahoma to be executed since 2021 after the state resumed executions that same year, thus ending a six-year moratorium on executions due to botched executions and problems with the state's lethal injection protocols.

== See also ==
- Capital punishment in Oklahoma
- List of people executed in Oklahoma
- List of people executed in the United States in 2022

Executions carried out in Oklahoma
Preceded by Gilbert Postelle February 17, 2022	James Allen Coddington; August 25, 2022	Succeeded by Benjamin Robert Cole Sr. October 20, 2022
Executions carried out in the United States
Preceded by Kosoul Chanthakoummane – Texas August 17, 2022	James Allen Coddington – Oklahoma; August 25, 2022	Succeeded by John Henry Ramirez – Texas October 5, 2022
