= List of people executed in Oklahoma =

The following is a list of people executed by the U.S. state of Oklahoma since 1976.

The total amounts to 133 people, and all were executed by lethal injection. Of the 133 people, 130 were male, and 3 were female, all of whom had been convicted of first-degree murder.

== List of people executed in Oklahoma since 1976 ==
No.	Name	Race	Age	Sex	Date of execution	County	Method	Victim(s)	Governor
1	Charles Troy Coleman	White	43	M	September 10, 1990	Muskogee	Lethal Injection	John Seward and Roxie Seward (Note: Coleman was never tried for the murder of Roxie Seward, however the couple was killed in the same incident.)	Henry Bellmon
2	Robyn Leroy Parks	Black	37	M	March 10, 1992	Oklahoma	Lethal Injection	Abdullah Ibrahim	David Walters
3	Olan Randle Robison	White	46	M	March 13, 1992	Stephens	Lethal Injection	Shiela Lovejoy, Averil Bourque, and Robert Swinford	David Walters
4	Thomas Joseph Grasso	White	32	M	March 20, 1995	Tulsa	Lethal Injection	Hilda Johnson (Note: Also killed Leslie Holtz in New York, but was executed for killing Johnson.)	Frank Keating
5	Roger Dale Stafford	White	43	M	July 1, 1995	McClain and Oklahoma	Lethal Injection	9 murder victims (Note: The 9 victims were: Melvin Lorenz, Linda Lorenz, Richard Lorenz, Isaac Freeman, Louis Zacarias, Terri Horst, David Salsman, Anthony Tew, and David Lindsey.)	Frank Keating
6	Robert Allen Brecheen	White	40	M	August 11, 1995	Tulsa	Lethal Injection	Marie Stubbs	Frank Keating
7	Benjamin Brewer	White	38	M	April 26, 1996	Canadian	Lethal Injection	Karen Joyce Stapleton	Frank Keating
8	Steven Keith Hatch	White	42	M	August 9, 1996	Carter	Lethal Injection	Richard Douglass and Marilyn Douglass	Frank Keating
9	Scott Dawn Carpenter	Native American	22	M	May 8, 1997	McIntosh	Lethal Injection	A.J. Kelley	Frank Keating
10	Michael Edward Long	White	35	M	February 20, 1998	Muskogee	Lethal Injection	Sheryl Graber and Andrew Graber	Frank Keating
11	Stephen Edward Wood	White	38	M	August 5, 1998	Greer	Lethal Injection	Robert B. Brigden	Frank Keating
12	Tuan Anh Nguyen	Asian	39	M	December 10, 1998	Tulsa	Lethal Injection	Donna Nguyen, Amanda White, and Joseph White	Frank Keating
13	John Wayne Duvall	White	47	M	December 17, 1998	Stephens	Lethal Injection	Karla Duvall	Frank Keating
14	John Walter Castro Sr.	Native American	37	M	January 7, 1999	Kay	Lethal Injection	Beulah Grace Sissons Cox and Rhonda Pappan	Frank Keating
15	Sean Richard Sellers	White	29	M	February 4, 1999	Oklahoma	Lethal Injection	Paul Bellofatto, Vonda Bellofatto, and Robert Paul Bower	Frank Keating
16	Scotty Lee Moore	White	42	M	June 3, 1999	Oklahoma	Lethal Injection	Alex Fernandez	Frank Keating
17	Norman Lee Newsted	White	45	M	July 8, 1999	Osage	Lethal Injection	4 murder victims (Note: The 4 victims were: Patricia Frei, Robert Bull, Ronald Schmid, and Larry Donnell Buckley. Newsted was executed for killing Buckley in Oklahoma. The other three victims were killed in Utah.)	Frank Keating
18	Cornel Cooks	Black	43	M	December 2, 1999	Comanche	Lethal Injection	Jennie Elva Ridling	Frank Keating
19	Bobby Lynn Ross	Black	41	M	December 9, 1999	Roger Mills	Lethal Injection	Elk City Police Sergeant Steven Leroy Mahan	Frank Keating
20	Malcolm Rent Johnson	Black	41	M	January 6, 2000	Oklahoma	Lethal Injection	Ura Alma Thompson	Frank Keating
21	Gary Alan Walker	White	46	M	January 13, 2000	Tulsa	Lethal Injection	5 murder victims (Note: The 5 victims were: Eddie O. Cash, Valerie Shaw-Hartzell, Jane Hilburn, Janet Jewell, and Margaret Bell Lydick.)	Frank Keating
22	Michael Donald Roberts	Black	41	M	February 10, 2000	Oklahoma	Lethal Injection	Lula Mae Brooks	Frank Keating
23	Kelly Lamont Rogers	Black	31	M	March 23, 2000	Payne	Lethal Injection	Karen Marie Lauffenburger	Frank Keating
24	Ronald Keith Boyd	Black	43	M	April 27, 2000	Oklahoma	Lethal Injection	Oklahoma City Police Officer Richard Oldham Riggs	Frank Keating
25	Charles Adrian Foster	Black	51	M	May 25, 2000	Muskogee	Lethal Injection	Claude Wiley	Frank Keating
26	James Glenn Robedeaux	Native American	51	M	June 1, 2000	Oklahoma	Lethal Injection	Nancy Rose Lee McKinney	Frank Keating
27	Roger James Berget	White	39	M	June 8, 2000	Oklahoma	Lethal Injection	Rick Lee Patterson	Frank Keating
28	William Clifford Bryson	Black	29	M	June 15, 2000	Oklahoma	Lethal Injection	James Earl Plantz	Frank Keating
29	Gregg Francis Braun	White	39	M	July 20, 2000	Carter	Lethal Injection	5 murder victims (Note: The 5 victims were: Gwendolyn Sue Miller, Barbara Kochendorfer, Mary Rains, Pete Spurrier, and Geraldine Valdez. Braun was executed for Miller's murder in Oklahoma, the other 4 victims were killed Kansas, Texas and New Mexico.)	Frank Keating
30	George Kent Wallace	White	59	M	August 10, 2000	LeFlore	Lethal Injection	William Von Eric Domer and Mark Anthony McLaughlin	Frank Keating
31	Eddie Leroy Trice	Black	48	M	January 9, 2001	Oklahoma	Lethal Injection	Ernestine Jones	Frank Keating
32	Wanda Jean Allen	Black	41	F	January 11, 2001	Oklahoma	Lethal Injection	Gloria Jean Leathers (Note: Also killed Dedra Pettus, but was executed for killing Leathers.)	Frank Keating
33	Floyd Allen Medlock	White	30	M	January 16, 2001	Canadian	Lethal Injection	Katherine Ann Busch	Frank Keating
34	Dion Athanasius Smallwood	Native American	31	M	January 18, 2001	Oklahoma	Lethal Injection	Lois Frederick	Frank Keating
35	Mark Andrew Fowler	White	35	M	January 23, 2001	Oklahoma	Lethal Injection	John Barrier, Rick Cast, and Chumpon Chaowasin	Frank Keating
36	Billy Ray Fox	White	35	M	January 25, 2001	Oklahoma	Lethal Injection	John Barrier, Rick Cast, and Chumpon Chaowasin	Frank Keating
37	Loyd Winford Lafevers	White	35	M	January 30, 2001	Oklahoma	Lethal Injection	Addie Mae Hawley	Frank Keating
38	Dorsie Leslie Jones Jr.	White	61	M	February 1, 2001	Comanche	Lethal Injection	Stanley Eugene Buck Sr.	Frank Keating
39	Robert William Clayton	White	40	M	March 1, 2001	Tulsa	Lethal Injection	Rhonda Kay Timmons	Frank Keating
40	Robert William Clayton	White	52	M	March 27, 2001	Tulsa	Lethal Injection	Ginger Lou Fluke, Kathryn Lee Fluke, and Suzanna Michelle Fluke	Frank Keating
41	Marilyn Kay Plantz	White	40	F	May 1, 2001	Oklahoma	Lethal Injection	James Earl Plantz	Frank Keating
42	Terrance Anthony James	Native American	41	M	May 22, 2001	Muskogee	Lethal Injection	Mark Allen Berry	Frank Keating
43	Vincent Allen Johnson	Black	42	M	May 29, 2001	Pittsburg	Lethal Injection	Shirley Mooneyham	Frank Keating
44	Jerald Wayne Harjo	Native American	40	M	July 17, 2001	Seminole	Lethal Injection	Ruth Porter	Frank Keating
45	Jack Dale Walker	White	35	M	August 28, 2001	Tulsa	Lethal Injection	Shelly Deann Ellison and Donald Gary Epperson	Frank Keating
46	Alvie James Hale Jr.	White	53	M	October 18, 2001	Pottawatomie	Lethal Injection	William Jeffery Perry	Frank Keating
47	Lois Nadean Smith	White	61	F	December 4, 2001	Sequoyah	Lethal Injection	Cindy Baillee	Frank Keating
48	Sahib Lateef Al-Mosawi	Arab	53	M	December 6, 2001	Oklahoma	Lethal Injection	Inaam Al-Nashi and Mohammed Al-Nashi	Frank Keating
49	John Joseph Romano	White	43	M	January 29, 2002	Oklahoma	Lethal Injection	Roger Joel Sarfaty and Lloyd Thompson	Frank Keating
50	David Wayne Woodruff	White	42	M	January 31, 2002	Oklahoma	Lethal Injection	Roger Joel Sarfaty and Lloyd Thompson	Frank Keating
51	Randall Eugene Cannon	White	42	M	July 23, 2002	Oklahoma	Lethal Injection	Addie Mae Hawley	Frank Keating
52	Earl Alexander Frederick Sr.	White	51	M	July 30, 2002	Oklahoma	Lethal Injection	Bradford Lee Beck	Frank Keating
53	Jerry Lynn McCracken	White	35	M	December 10, 2002	Oklahoma	Lethal Injection	4 murder victims (Note: The 4 victims were: Tyrrell Lee Boyd, Steve Allen Smith, Timothy Edward Sheets, and Carol Ann McDaniels.)	Frank Keating
54	Jay Wesley Neill	White	37	M	December 12, 2002	Comanche (Note: Was tried and convicted in Oklahoma County.)	Lethal Injection	4 murder victims (Note: The 4 victims were: Kay Bruno, Jerri Bowles, Joyce Mullenix, and Ralph Zeller.)	Frank Keating
55	Ernest Marvin Carter Jr.	Black	36	M	December 17, 2002	Oklahoma	Lethal Injection	Eugene Manowski	Frank Keating
56	Daniel Juan Revilla	White	34	M	January 16, 2003	Jackson	Lethal Injection	Mark Gomez	Brad Henry
57	Bobby Joe Fields	Black	39	M	February 13, 2003	Oklahoma	Lethal Injection	Louise J. Schem	Brad Henry
58	Walanzo Deon Robinson	Black	31	M	March 18, 2003	Oklahoma	Lethal Injection	Dennis Eugene Hill	Brad Henry
59	John Michael Hooker	Black	49	M	March 25, 2003	Oklahoma	Lethal Injection	Sylvia Stokes and Drusilla Morgan (Note: Also killed Alta Lang, but was executed for killing Stokes and Morgan.)	Brad Henry
60	Scott Allen Hain	White	32	M	April 3, 2003	Creek	Lethal Injection	Michael William Houghton and Laura Lee Sanders	Brad Henry
61	Don Wilson Hawkins Jr.	White	43	M	April 8, 2003	Oklahoma	Lethal Injection	Linda Ann Thompson	Brad Henry
62	Larry Kenneth Jackson	Black	40	M	April 17, 2003	Oklahoma	Lethal Injection	Wendy Cade	Brad Henry
63	Robert Wesley Knighton	White	62	M	May 27, 2003	Noble	Lethal Injection	5 murder victims (Note: The 5 victims were: Coffier Day, Frank Merrifield, Ray Donahue, Richard Denney, and Virginia Denney. Knighton was executed for killing the Denneys in Oklahoma. The other three victims were killed in Missouri.)	Brad Henry
64	Kenneth Chad Charm	Black	37	M	June 5, 2003	Comanche	Lethal Injection	Brandy Crystian Hill	Brad Henry
65	Lewis Eugene Gilbert II	White	31	M	July 1, 2003	Cleveland	Lethal Injection	4 murder victims (Note: The 4 victims were: Ruth Lucille Loader, William Forest Brewer, Flossie Mae Brewer, and Roxanne Lynn Ruddell. Gilbert was executed for killing Ruddell in Oklahoma. Loader was killed in Ohio while the Brewers were killed in Missouri.)	Brad Henry
66	Robert Don Duckett	White	39	M	July 8, 2003	Oklahoma	Lethal Injection	John E. Howard	Brad Henry
67	Bryan Anthony Toles	Black	31	M	July 22, 2003	Comanche	Lethal Injection	Juan Franceschi and Lonnie Franceschi	Brad Henry
68	Jackie Lee Willingham	White	33	M	July 24, 2003	Comanche	Lethal Injection	Jayne Ellen Van Wey	Brad Henry
69	Harold Loyd McElmurry III	White	33	M	July 29, 2003	McIntosh	Lethal Injection	Rosa Vivien Pendley and Robert Pendley	Brad Henry
70	Tyrone Peter Darks	Black	39	M	January 13, 2004	Cleveland	Lethal Injection	Sherry Goodlow	Brad Henry
71	Norman Richard Cleary	White	38	M	February 17, 2004	Tulsa	Lethal Injection	Wanda Neafus	Brad Henry
72	David Jay Brown	White	49	M	March 9, 2004	Grady	Lethal Injection	Eldon Lee McGuire	Brad Henry
73	Hung Thanh Le	Asian	37	M	March 23, 2004	Oklahoma	Lethal Injection	Hai Hong Nguyen	Brad Henry
74	Robert Leroy Bryan	White	63	M	June 8, 2004	Beckham	Lethal Injection	Mildred Inabell Bryan	Brad Henry
75	Windel Ray Workman	White	46	M	August 26, 2004	Oklahoma	Lethal Injection	Amanda Hollman	Brad Henry
76	Jimmie Ray Slaughter	White	57	M	March 15, 2005	Oklahoma	Lethal Injection	Melody Sue Wuertz and Jessica Rae Wuertz	Brad Henry
77	George James Miller Jr.	Black	37	M	May 12, 2005	Oklahoma	Lethal Injection	Gary Kent Dodd	Brad Henry
78	Michael Lannier Pennington	Black	37	M	July 19, 2005	Comanche	Lethal Injection	Bradley Thomas Grooms	Brad Henry
79	Kenneth Eugene Turrentine	Black	52	M	August 11, 2005	Tulsa	Lethal Injection	4 murder victims (Note: The 4 victims were: Avon Stevenson, Anita Richardson, Tina Pennington, and Martise Richardson.)	Brad Henry
80	Richard Alford Thornburg Jr.	White	40	M	April 18, 2006	Grady	Lethal Injection	Jim Poteet, Terry Shepard, and Kevin Smith	Brad Henry
81	John Albert Boltz	White	74	M	June 1, 2006	Pottawatomie	Lethal Injection	Doug Kirby	Brad Henry
82	Eric Allen Patton	Black	49	M	August 29, 2006	Oklahoma	Lethal Injection	Charlene Kauer	Brad Henry
83	James Patrick Malicoat	White	31	M	August 31, 2006	Grady	Lethal Injection	Tessa Leadford	Brad Henry
84	Corey Duane Hamilton	Black	38	M	January 9, 2007	Tulsa	Lethal Injection	4 murder victims (Note: The 4 victims were: Joseph Gooch, Theodore Kindley, Senaida Lara, and Steven Williams.)	Brad Henry
85	Jimmy Dale Bland	White	49	M	June 26, 2007	Tillman	Lethal Injection	Doyle Windle Rains	Brad Henry
86	Frank Duane Welch	White	46	M	August 21, 2007	Cleveland	Lethal Injection	Jo Talley Cooper and Debra Anne Stevens	Brad Henry
87	Terry Lyn Short	White	47	M	June 17, 2008	Oklahoma	Lethal Injection	Ken Yamamoto	Brad Henry
88	Jessie James Cummings Jr.	White	52	M	September 25, 2008	Choctaw	Lethal Injection	Melissa Moody	Brad Henry
89	Darwin Demond Brown	Black	32	M	January 22, 2009	Tulsa	Lethal Injection	Richard Kevin Yost	Brad Henry
90	Donald Lee Gilson	White	48	M	May 14, 2009	Cleveland	Lethal Injection	Shane Coffman	Brad Henry
91	Michael Paul DeLozier	White	32	M	July 9, 2009	McCurtain	Lethal Injection	Orville Lewis Bullard and Paul Steven Morgan	Brad Henry
92	Julius Ricardo Young	Black	60	M	January 14, 2010	Tulsa	Lethal Injection	Joyland Morgan and Kewan Morgan	Brad Henry
93	Donald Ray Wackerly II	White	41	M	October 14, 2010	Sequoyah	Lethal Injection	Pan Sayakhoummane	Brad Henry
94	John David Duty	White	58	M	December 16, 2010	Pittsburg	Lethal Injection	Curtis Wise	Brad Henry
95	Billy Don Alverson	Black	39	M	January 6, 2011	Tulsa	Lethal Injection	Richard Kevin Yost	Brad Henry
96	Jeffrey David Matthews	White	38	M	January 11, 2011	Cleveland	Lethal Injection	Otis Earl Short	Mary Fallin
97	Gary Roland Welch	White	49	M	January 5, 2012	Ottawa	Lethal Injection	Robert Dean Hardcastle	Mary Fallin
98	Timothy Shaun Stemple	White	46	M	March 15, 2012	Tulsa	Lethal Injection	Trisha Stemple	Mary Fallin
99	Michael Bascum Selsor	White	57	M	May 1, 2012	Tulsa	Lethal Injection	Clayton Chandler	Mary Fallin
100	Michael Edward Hooper	White	40	M	August 14, 2012	Canadian	Lethal Injection	Cynthia Jarman, Tonya Jarman, and Timmy Jarman	Mary Fallin
101	Garry Thomas Allen	Black	56	M	November 6, 2012	Pittsburg	Lethal Injection	Lawanna Gail Titsworth	Mary Fallin
102	George Ochoa	Hispanic	38	M	December 4, 2012	Oklahoma	Lethal Injection	Francisco Morales and Maria Yanez	Mary Fallin
103	Steven Ray Thacker	White	42	M	March 12, 2013	Mayes	Lethal Injection	Laci Dawn Hill, Forrest Reed Boyd, and Ray Patterson (Note: Thacker was executed for Hill's murder, which took place in Oklahoma; the other two victims were killed in Missouri (for which Thacker received a life sentence) and Tennessee (for which Thacker received a death sentence), respectively.)	Mary Fallin
104	James Lewis DeRosa	White	36	M	June 18, 2013	LeFlore	Lethal Injection	Curtis Plummer and Gloria Plummer	Mary Fallin
105	Brian Darrell Davis	Black	39	M	June 25, 2013	Kay	Lethal Injection	Josephine Sanford	Mary Fallin
106	Anthony Rozelle Banks	Black	61	M	September 10, 2013	Tulsa	Lethal Injection	Sun Travis	Mary Fallin
107	Ronald Clinton Lott	Black	53	M	December 10, 2013	Oklahoma	Lethal Injection	Anna Laura Fowler and Zelma Cutler	Mary Fallin
108	Johnny Dale Black	White	48	M	December 17, 2013	Stephens	Lethal Injection	Bill Pogue	Mary Fallin
109	Michael Lee Wilson	Black	38	M	January 9, 2014	Tulsa	Lethal Injection	Richard Kevin Yost	Mary Fallin
110	Kenneth Eugene Hogan	White	52	M	January 23, 2014	Oklahoma	Lethal Injection	Lisa Stanley	Mary Fallin
111	Clayton Derrell Lockett	Black	38	M	April 29, 2014	Kay	Lethal Injection	Stephanie Neiman	Mary Fallin
112	Charles Frederick Warner	Black	47	M	January 15, 2015	Oklahoma	Lethal Injection	Adrianna Waller	Mary Fallin
113	John Marion Grant	Black	60	M	October 28, 2021	Osage	Lethal Injection	Gay Lee Carter	Kevin Stitt
114	Bigler Jobe Stouffer II	White	79	M	December 9, 2021	Oklahoma	Lethal Injection	Linda Kay Reaves	Kevin Stitt
115	Donald Anthony Grant	Black	46	M	January 27, 2022	Oklahoma	Lethal Injection	Brenda McElyea and Felicia Suzette Smith	Kevin Stitt
116	Gilbert Ray Postelle	White	35	M	February 17, 2022	Oklahoma	Lethal Injection	4 murder victims (Note: The 4 victims were: James Alderson, Terry Smith, Donnie Swindle, and Amy Wright.)	Kevin Stitt
117	James Allen Coddington	White	50	M	August 25, 2022	Oklahoma	Lethal Injection	Albert Troy Hale	Kevin Stitt
118	Benjamin Robert Cole Sr.	White	57	M	October 20, 2022	Rogers	Lethal Injection	Brianna Victoria Cole	Kevin Stitt
119	Richard Stephen Fairchild	White	63	M	November 17, 2022	Oklahoma	Lethal Injection	Adam Broomhall	Kevin Stitt
120	Scott James Eizember	White	62	M	January 12, 2023	Creek (Note: Was tried and convicted in Canadian County.)	Lethal Injection	A.J. Cantrell and Patsy Maye Cantrell	Kevin Stitt
121	Jemaine Monteil Cannon	Black	51	M	July 20, 2023	Tulsa	Lethal Injection	Sharonda White Clark	Kevin Stitt
122	Anthony Castillo Sanchez	Hispanic	44	M	September 21, 2023	Cleveland	Lethal Injection	Jewell Jean Busken	Kevin Stitt
123	Phillip Dean Hancock	White	59	M	November 30, 2023	Oklahoma	Lethal Injection	James Vincent Lynch III and Robert Lee Jett Jr. (Note: Also killed Charles Lester Warren, but was executed for killing Lynch and Jett.)	Kevin Stitt
124	Michael Dewayne Smith	Black	41	M	April 4, 2024	Oklahoma	Lethal Injection	Janet Denise Moore and Sarath Pulluru (Note: Also killed Otis Payne Jr., but was executed for killing Moore and Pulluru.)	Kevin Stitt
125	Richard Norman Rojem Jr.	White	66	M	June 27, 2024	Washita	Lethal Injection	Layla Dawn Marie Cummings	Kevin Stitt
126	Emmanuel Antonia Littlejohn	Black	52	M	September 26, 2024	Oklahoma	Lethal Injection	Kenneth Meers	Kevin Stitt
127	Kevin Ray Underwood	White	45	M	December 19, 2024	McClain (Note: Was tried and convicted in Cleveland County.)	Lethal Injection	Jamie Rose Bolin	Kevin Stitt
128	Wendell Arden Grissom	White	56	M	March 20, 2025	Blaine	Lethal Injection	Amber Dawn Matthews	Kevin Stitt
129	George John Hanson	Black	61	M	June 12, 2025	Tulsa	Lethal Injection	Mary Agnes Bowles and Jerald Max Thurman	Kevin Stitt
130	Kendrick Antonio Simpson	Black	45	M	February 12, 2026	Oklahoma	Lethal Injection	Anthony Jones and Glen Palmer	Kevin Stitt
131	Raymond Eugene Johnson	Black	52	M	May 14, 2026	Tulsa	Lethal Injection	Brooke Whitaker and Kya Whitaker (Note: Also killed Clarence Ray Oliver, but was executed for killing the Whitakers.)	Kevin Stitt
132	Carlos Cuesta-Rodriguez	Hispanic	70	M	August 13, 2026	Oklahoma	Lethal Injection	Olimpia Cardina Fisher	Kevin Stitt
133	James Dwight Pavatt	White	73	M	November 12, 2026	Oklahoma	Lethal Injection	Robert Dale Andrew	Kevin Stitt

== Demographics ==
Race
White	77	58%
Black	43	32%
Native American	7	5%
Hispanic	3	2%
Asian	2	2%
Arab	1	1%
Age
20–29	4	3%
30–39	45	34%
40–49	47	35%
50–59	22	17%
60–69	11	8%
70–79	4	3%
Sex
Male	130	98%
Female	3	2%
Date of execution
1976–1979	0	0%
1980–1989	0	0%
1990–1999	19	14%
2000–2009	72	54%
2010–2019	21	16%
2020–2029	21	16%
Method
Lethal injection	133	100%
Governor (Party)
David Boren (D)	0	0%
George Nigh (D)	0	0%
Henry Bellmon (R)	1	1%
David Walters (D)	2	2%
Frank Keating (R)	52	39%
Brad Henry (D)	40	30%
Mary Fallin (R)	17	13%
Kevin Stitt (R)	21	16%
Total	133	100%

== See also ==
- Capital punishment in Oklahoma
- Capital punishment in the United States
- List of people executed in Oklahoma (pre-1972) – executions before Furman
