= Execution of John Grant =

2021 execution by the state of Oklahoma

John Grant
- Grant in 2020
- Born: John Marion Grant; April 12, 1961; Ada, Oklahoma, U.S.
- Died: October 28, 2021 (aged 60); Oklahoma State Penitentiary, McAlester, Oklahoma, U.S.
- Cause of death: Execution by lethal injection
- Convictions: Armed robbery ×5 (1980 and 1981); First degree murder (1998)
- Penalty: 130 years (1980 and 1981); Death by lethal injection (2000)

Details
- Victims: Gay Carter, 58
- Date: November 13, 1998

The execution of John Grant (April 12, 1961 – October 28, 2021) took place in the U.S. state of Oklahoma by means of lethal injection. Grant was sentenced to death for the 1998 murder of prison cafeteria worker Gay Lee Carter (née Westbrook; October 9, 1940 – November 13, 1998).

Grant's execution followed a six-year moratorium on executions in Oklahoma due to the botched executions of Clayton Lockett and Charles Frederick Warner in 2014 and 2015, respectively. In 2021, following a series of legal challenges to lethal injection, executions resumed in the state, starting with Grant. His execution generated significant media attention and controversy due to his negative reaction to the lethal injection drugs, particularly the sedative midazolam.

== Background ==
=== Early life ===
John Marion Grant was born on April 12, 1961, in Ada, Oklahoma. He was one of nine children, and his father was not present during his childhood. Grant and his siblings grew up in abject poverty in a home with a dirt floor and no running water. Grant's mother was allegedly an alcoholic who was neglectful and physically abusive; as an infant, Grant was largely raised by his six-year-old sister. As a child, he started stealing to provide for his siblings.

Grant's first stint in prison occurred in the 1970s, when he was between 11 and 12 years old, and Grant lost contact with his family when he was 15. Grant's attorneys alleged that at the time, Oklahoma's juvenile justice system was "among the worst in the country" and that there were "widespread abuses in the juvenile system" at the time. A 1981 report from the television program 20/20 chronicled the sexual abuse and torture that often occurred in Oklahoma's juvenile justice system.

As a pre-teen and as an adult, Grant served multiple sentences in prison and jails. A psychiatrist who testified on Grant's behalf during one of his clemency hearings, Dr. Donna Schwartz-Watts, diagnosed Grant with reactive attachment disorder due to his traumatic childhood.

=== Crime ===
At the time of the murder for which Grant was executed, he had been imprisoned at the Dick Conner Correctional Center in Hominy, Oklahoma, since December 30, 1980, when he was 19 years old. He was serving a 130-year sentence for four separate armed robbery convictions, and he had served approximately 18 of those years at the time of the murder. Grant had also served time at the same prison on an earlier occasion, during which he had been employed in the prison kitchen and knew Carter. Due to fighting with another inmate, Grant lost his job.

Both on the morning before the murder and the morning of the murder (November 13, 1998), Grant and Carter had argued over Grant's breakfast tray. During both of these arguments, two inmates who worked in the prison dining area overheard Grant threatening Carter. After the last argument, the two inmates saw Grant loitering near a storage closet containing cleaning supplies; soon afterwards, Carter walked by that closet, at which point Grant grabbed her and pulled her into the closet. While in the closet, Grant stabbed Carter in the chest with a prison-made shank. After a correctional officer arrived to help Carter, Grant fled and attempted to stab himself with the shank. Prison officials soon subdued Grant. Meanwhile, medical personnel attempted to aid Carter, who had stopped breathing. She was pronounced dead at the hospital, with her cause of death being sixteen stab wounds, one of which punctured her aorta and caused rapid blood loss and death.

Grant was convicted of Carter's murder and sentenced to death on May 8, 2000.

== Lethal injection issues ==
=== Botched executions in Oklahoma ===
Lethal injections typically involve a three-drug cocktail consisting of an anesthetic (typically sodium thiopental), a muscle relaxant to paralyze an inmate's muscles and cease breathing, and potassium chloride to stop the inmate's heart and ultimately cause death. However, in the late 2000s, the company providing sodium thiopental to US states for execution stopped making the drug, and European manufacturers refused to sell sodium thiopental for use in executions, leading states that rely on lethal injection to face drug shortages. Several states, including Oklahoma, sought replacements; Oklahoma was one of at least six states to use midazolam, a sedative, in place of the previous anesthetic.

At the time of Grant's execution, a moratorium on executions had been in place in Oklahoma since January 2015 following two controversial executions in the state. The first, that of Clayton Lockett on April 29, 2014, involved Lockett having a violent reaction after being injected with the sedative midazolam; witnesses reported that Lockett twitched, convulsed, and spoke expressing his physical distress. Officials halted the execution, but Lockett died of a heart attack 43 minutes after the execution process began. Lockett's execution marked the first time Oklahoma had ever used midazolam as the first drug in their three-drug cocktail. The state subsequently revised their protocols to increase the dosage of midazolam administered to inmates.

The second controversial execution, and the one ultimately leading to the moratorium, was that of Charles Frederick Warner, who was executed in Oklahoma on January 15, 2015, using the protocol that increased the amount of midazolam administered. During the execution, Warner reportedly said, "It feels like acid," and "My body is on fire," but otherwise did not show any other signs of physical distress. Warner's execution took approximately 18 minutes.

Days following Warner's execution, the Supreme Court of the United States agreed to hear an argument from several Oklahoma death row inmates arguing that the state's lethal injection protocol violated the Eighth Amendment to the United States Constitution prohibiting cruel and unusual punishment. In June 2015, in a 5–4 vote, the Supreme Court upheld Oklahoma's usage of midazolam, after which the state scheduled the execution of Richard Glossip to take place in September 2015. Shortly before Glossip's scheduled execution, the state learned that a drug supplier had sent the Oklahoma Department of Corrections a supply of potassium acetate rather than potassium chloride. Potassium chloride is the third drug prescribed in Oklahoma's lethal injection protocol. An autopsy on Charles Warner's and Clayton Lockett's bodies revealed that the state had used potassium acetate during each of their executions as well, in violation of their protocol. Then-Oklahoma Governor Mary Fallin issued a last-minute stay of execution for Glossip, while then-Oklahoma Attorney General Scott Pruitt indefinitely stayed all executions in the state so that his office could investigate the error, stating that his office and the state had "a strong interest in ensuring that the execution protocol is strictly followed."

=== Resumption of executions in Oklahoma ===
A grand jury consisting of Oklahomans from several counties reviewed Oklahoma's execution protocol and recommended several revisions. On February 13, 2020, Oklahoma announced intentions to resume carrying out executions by lethal injection while following the recommended protocol revisions, stating that although they had explored nitrogen gas asphyxiation as a potential substitute, the state had found a "reliable supply of drugs" for future lethal injections. The revisions included verifying that the proper execution drugs have been ordered and will be used at each step, and providing more training for the corrections team tasked with carrying out executions. The revised protocol still included the usage of midazolam, alongside the muscle relaxant vecuronium bromide, and potassium chloride.

A federal lawsuit filed by 32 Oklahoma death row inmates was heard on February 28, 2022. It sought to challenge Oklahoma's lethal injection protocol in an effort to have it declared unconstitutionally cruel and unusual, in violation of the US Constitution's Eighth Amendment. Of the inmates on the original challenge, 26 provided the federal court with alternative methods of execution, including seven agreeing to the usage of different drug combinations that did not contain midazolam, and 19 agreeing to the firing squad. The other six inmates, including John Grant, failed to offer an alternative method of execution. Their failure to offer an alternative method led to them being dropped from the lawsuit, soon after which they had execution dates set, with Grant's execution being scheduled first out of the six, for October 28, 2021. While the challenge to lethal injection was heard by Federal Judge Stephen P. Friot in February 2022, meaning that the other 26 inmates would not be executed until the challenge was heard, Friot ruled that the executions of those inmates who had refused to propose an alternative could move forward prior to the hearing. In his ruling, he stated, "The case is complete in this court as to these five plaintiffs."

== Appeals and execution ==
=== Appeals for clemency ===
Grant made several appeals for a commutation of his sentence to life without parole prior to his execution. One, in 2014, was unanimously rejected after Grant's attorneys claimed that his murder of Carter was motivated by an alleged romantic relationship that he had with her. The victim's daughter Pam Carter called the allegation "heinous", stating "I lost my mother, and now I feel victimized all over again."

Grant's final appeal to Oklahoma's pardons and paroles board was in early October 2021, weeks before his death. This time, Grant's attorneys focused on his troubled upbringing and extensive prison history. Grant's attorneys also insisted that with the passage of time, Grant had become remorseful for Carter's murder. Oklahoma officials countered by stating that Grant's conviction and sentence had been upheld by numerous courts. They also mentioned a 2005 incident in which Grant assaulted a fellow death row inmate who subsequently required stitches, as well as two incidents in 2008 and 2009 where he threatened corrections officials. The board rejected Grant's second clemency appeal by a 3–2 vote.

=== Execution ===
On October 28, 2021, at 3:15 p.m., approximately 45 minutes before Grant's scheduled execution time, an internal report claimed that Grant was observed "hurried[ly]" eating and drinking a large amount of potato chips and soda. A restraint team took him to get a shower, after which he was escorted to the execution chamber.

Grant's execution began at approximately 4:00 p.m. Eyewitness accounts of what happened during Grant's execution varied. Grant reportedly shouted, "Let's go! Let's go! Let's go!" from behind a curtain. Afterwards, the curtain was raised, at which point Grant shouted a "stream of profanities."

Witnesses agreed that after the first drug, midazolam, was administered, Grant began convulsing and vomiting. Several minutes after Grant began vomiting, two members of the execution team wiped the vomit from his face and neck. Sean Murphy, a reporter with the Associated Press who had witnessed 14 lethal injections at the time of Grant's, stated that Grant "began to convulse—‌pretty hard, I would say—‌and then began vomiting about a minute later." Murphy described Grant's convulsions as "full body" and "pretty violent," stating that Grant continued to breathe until one minute after the second drug began flowing. Murphy said, "I've never seen an inmate vomit. I've witnessed about 14 executions and [...] I've never witnessed that before."

Grant requested that a public defender named Julie Gardner attend his execution. Gardner, who had seen six executions prior, told reporters that Grant's execution was the first she had seen where midazolam was used. She called the execution "horrifying" and stated that it looked peaceful at first, but Grant began struggling to breathe, gasping for breath, and struggling to raise a shoulder from the gurney seven minutes after the midazolam was administered. Gardner stated, "It appeared like he was drowning in his own vomit." Another one of Grant's requested witnesses, public defender Meghan LeFrancois, also reported that Grant struggled to breathe and gasped for air during the execution and that his back arched off the gurney at one point. LeFrancois claimed that Grant's breathing did not calm until more than six minutes into the execution process. Grant was pronounced dead 21 minutes after he was first administered midazolam.

Michael Graczyk, a retired Associated Press reporter who still covers executions for the organization on a freelance basis, has witnessed the death penalty being carried out about 450 times. He said he could only recall one instance of someone vomiting while being put to death.

Several Oklahoma officials who witnessed the execution contested the graphic press accounts of Grant's execution. Scott Crow, the Director of the Oklahoma Department of Corrections, said in a news conference the day after the execution that contrary to reports of Grant convulsing and breathing, Grant began snoring lightly seconds after being administered midazolam. Crow said, "There's different opinions as to what occurred next. . . . There's some that have indicated that [Grant dry-heaved] two dozen [times]. From my vantage point, I didn't see that." Crow stated that, "There were no instances of any unusual behavior throughout the drug protocol, other than the . . . regurgitation." Crow accused reporters of publishing "embellished" accounts of Grant's execution and declared that the Department of Corrections was not "planning any new changes" to their protocols in response to Grant's execution.

Oklahoma paid an anesthesiologist, Dr. Ervin Yen, to observe the execution from a separate witness room behind the media. Yen stated that Grant's execution had been smooth and occurred without errors and that Grant appeared to have been unconscious and incapable of feeling pain between 30 and 45 seconds after receiving a dose of midazolam. Yen claimed that the midazolam alone was likely Grant's cause of death.

==== Autopsy results ====
In February 2022, results from Grant's autopsy were made public. The findings, which were recorded the day after Grant's execution and finalized on January 24, 2022, largely corroborated what media witnesses had stated regarding Grant's physical reaction to the lethal injection drugs. Dr. Jeremy Shelton of the Oklahoma State Medical Examiner's office found that Grant had inhaled vomit into his airway. The autopsy also showed that Grant's lungs were "heavy" with fluid and that he likely experienced "flash pulmonary edema" as liquid quickly built up in his lungs, giving Grant a feeling akin to suffocation or drowning. Lethal injection experts have likened the sensation to waterboarding, a form of torture, and described it as "drowning, asphyxia, and terror." Grant's lungs weighed 1,390 grams each at the time of the autopsy, more than three times the weight of an average human lung, and he suffered intramuscular bleeding of his tongue, a common phenomenon found in victims of drowning and asphyxiation.

After the execution, Robert Dunham, the executive director of the Death Penalty Information Center, criticized DOC Director Crow for accusing reporters of exaggerating what happened during the execution, stating, "When self-interested public officials deny reality, it further undermines public confidence in everything they do. When it comes to capital punishment, it suggests that Oklahoma can't be trusted with the death penalty. If they're not willing to tell the truth about things that neutral, objective reporters have seen with their own eyes, then what else aren't they telling the truth about?"

== See also ==
- Capital punishment in Oklahoma
- List of botched executions
- List of people executed in Oklahoma
- List of people executed in the United States in 2021

Executions carried out in Oklahoma
| Preceded by Charles Frederick Warner January 15, 2015 | John Grant; October 28, 2021 | Succeeded by Bigler Stouffer December 9, 2021 |
Executions carried out in the United States
| Preceded by Willie B. Smith – Alabama October 21, 2021 | John Grant – Oklahoma; October 28, 2021 | Succeeded by David Neal Cox – Mississippi November 17, 2021 |
