= Execution of Clayton Lockett =

2014 botched execution in Oklahoma, U.S.

Clayton Lockett
- Mugshot of Lockett
- Born: Clayton Derrell Lockett; November 22, 1975; United States
- Died: April 29, 2014 (aged 38); Oklahoma State Penitentiary, McAlester, Oklahoma, U.S.
- Cause of death: Heart attack caused by botched lethal injection
- Convictions: First-degree murder; Rape (7 counts); Kidnapping (4 counts); Robbery (2 counts); First-degree burglary; Assault with a dangerous weapon (2 counts); Assault and battery; Conspiracy (2000)
- Penalty: Death plus 2,285 years (October 5, 2000)

Details
- Victims: Stephanie Neiman

The death of Clayton Derrell Lockett occurred on April 29, 2014, when he suffered a heart attack during an execution by lethal injection in the U.S. state of Oklahoma. Lockett, aged 38, was convicted in 2000 of murder, rape, and kidnapping.

Lockett was administered an untested mixture of drugs that had not previously been used for executions in the United States. Although the execution was stopped, Lockett died 43 minutes after being sedated. He writhed, groaned, convulsed, and spoke during the process and attempted to rise from the execution table fourteen minutes into the procedure, despite having been declared unconscious. The manner of his death drew national and international attention.

== Background ==
=== Early life ===
Clayton Lockett was born in 1975. His mother left him when he was three years old, and he was then raised by his father, who severely physically abused Lockett throughout his childhood, forced drugs upon him starting at age three, and taught him to steal without being caught.

=== Criminal history ===
In 1992, at the age of sixteen, Lockett pleaded guilty in Kay County to burglary and knowingly concealing stolen property. He received a seven-year prison sentence. Earlier that year, he pleaded no contest to two counts of intimidating state witnesses.

While imprisoned at age 16 at the Oklahoma State Penitentiary, a prison for adults, Lockett was gang raped by three adult male prisoners.

In 1996, Lockett was sentenced to four years in prison for a conviction in Grady County, for conspiracy to commit a felony.

In June 1999, Lockett kidnapped and shot Stephanie Neiman, a 19-year-old high school graduate, a friend of Lockett's other victims, and a witness to his crimes. Neiman was dropping off a friend at a Perry residence on June 3, 1999, the same evening Clayton Lockett and two accomplices decided to pull a home invasion robbery there. Neiman fought Lockett when he tried to take the keys to her truck.

The men had also beaten and kidnapped Neiman's friend along with Bobby Bornt, who lived in the residence, and Bornt's 9-month-old baby.

He used duct tape to bind her hands and cover her mouth. After being driven to a remote area, Neiman stated that she would go to the police as soon as he released her. Lockett walked her into a ravine and had his accomplices help her over a barbed wire fence, where Lockett shot her from a distance of approximately six feet with a 1/4-ounce slug from a sawed-off 12-gauge shotgun. The impact from the slug tore into her chest and shoulder, knocking her to the ground, then Lockett's gun jammed. Lockett then walked back to his vehicle, used a screwdriver to unjam his shotgun, walked back to where Neiman lay, and shot her in the chest at a distance of about two feet. That shot also was not fatal. Lockett stated, "I ain't going to shoot her again," and instead instructed an accomplice to bury her alive. She then died from the wounds.

On June 4, 1999, Lockett and his two accomplices, Alfonzo Veasey Lockett and Shawn Mathis were arrested in Enid, Oklahoma by Perry Police Detective Lieutenant David Farrow at a convenience store located on South Van Buren Street. The shotgun used in the murder was hidden in a box spring mattress inside of a garage behind a house where Lockett had been staying. Farrow's investigation uncovered approximately 86 individual pieces of evidence that were presented at Lockett's trial to include, the 12 gauge shotgun used, DNA from the murder victim, fingerprints from the duct tape used to bind his victims, and eyewitness testimony. At his 1999 murder trial, this evidence led to Lockett and his accomplices' convictions. In 2000, he and his accomplices were convicted of murder, rape, forcible sodomy, kidnapping, assault, and battery. Clayton Lockett was sentenced to death, while his two accomplices, Alfonzo Veasey Lockett and Shawn Mathis, were sentenced to life in prison.

=== On lethal injections ===
From 1890 to 2010, the rate of botched (Note: Professor Austin Sarat of Amherst College defines a "botched" execution as one where "the executioners departed from official legal protocol or standard operating procedure".) lethal injections in the United States was 7.1%, higher than any other form of execution, with firing squads at 0%, the electric chair at 1.9%, hanging at 3.1%, and the gas chamber at 5.4%.

In 2011, Hospira announced that it would stop manufacturing sodium thiopental, due to use by American prisons for executions. "Virtually all" death rows in the US were left without a steady supply of the anesthetic, which is used to numb the pain of potassium chloride stopping the heart. Some states bartered supplies of execution drugs, while other states were accused of illegally buying drugs from India and other sources. The Drug Enforcement Administration seized supplies of sodium thiopental from several states in spring and summer 2011, questioning how they were imported. Other manufacturers have also refused to provide pharmaceutical drugs for execution purposes, and a European export ban added to problems obtaining the necessary drugs.

Due to the supply issues, Oklahoma used an untested mixture of midazolam (to make the victim fall unconscious), vecuronium bromide (to paralyse), and potassium chloride (used to stop the heart) for Lockett's execution. While Florida had previously used the same three drugs in a 2013 execution, they used 500 mg of midazolam rather than the 100 mg used by Oklahoma. Secrecy laws in Oklahoma prevent the public knowing more than which three drugs were used. The state refused to explain why that drug combination was chosen, what the drug specifics were as to labelling, and how they were obtained. Reportedly, the drugs were bought with petty cash, making the transaction harder to track and to challenge legally.

Dennis McGuire took 25 minutes to die; he gasped and snorted. The U.S. Supreme Court has ruled that if the first drug does not make the inmate unconscious there is an unacceptable risk of suffocation and pain from the two following drugs. Potassium chloride causes severe pain if used without an anesthetic. Pharmacology professor, Craig Stevens of Oklahoma State University asked why anesthesiology or pharmacology experts were not consulted. "Midazolam has no analgesic properties. It's a whole different drug class than sodium thiopental or barbiturates," Stevens said. Stevens described dying from the other two drugs without anesthetic as "horrific". The drug combination used is considered too painful to euthanise animals. "Veterinarians in at least one state are barred from using a three-drug formula which has been used on several inmates, including Clayton Lockett."

Oklahoma Governor Mary Fallin had strongly pushed for the execution to take place despite the lack of standard drugs, initially issuing an executive order to proceed despite a stay by the Supreme Court of Oklahoma. Republican allies of Fallin started impeachment proceedings against the justices who tried to delay the execution; the stay was later lifted. Lockett's lawyers also unsuccessfully sought to force Oklahoma to reveal the source of the drugs, which the state refused. Oklahoma officials testified that the drugs to be used in Lockett's execution had been legally obtained and had not expired.

Before the execution, Lockett's stepmother LaDonna Hollins was reported as saying, "I want to know what mixture of drugs are you going to use now? Is this instant? Is this going to cause horrible pain?" and "I know he's scared. He said he's not scared of the dying as much as the drugs administered."

== Execution ==
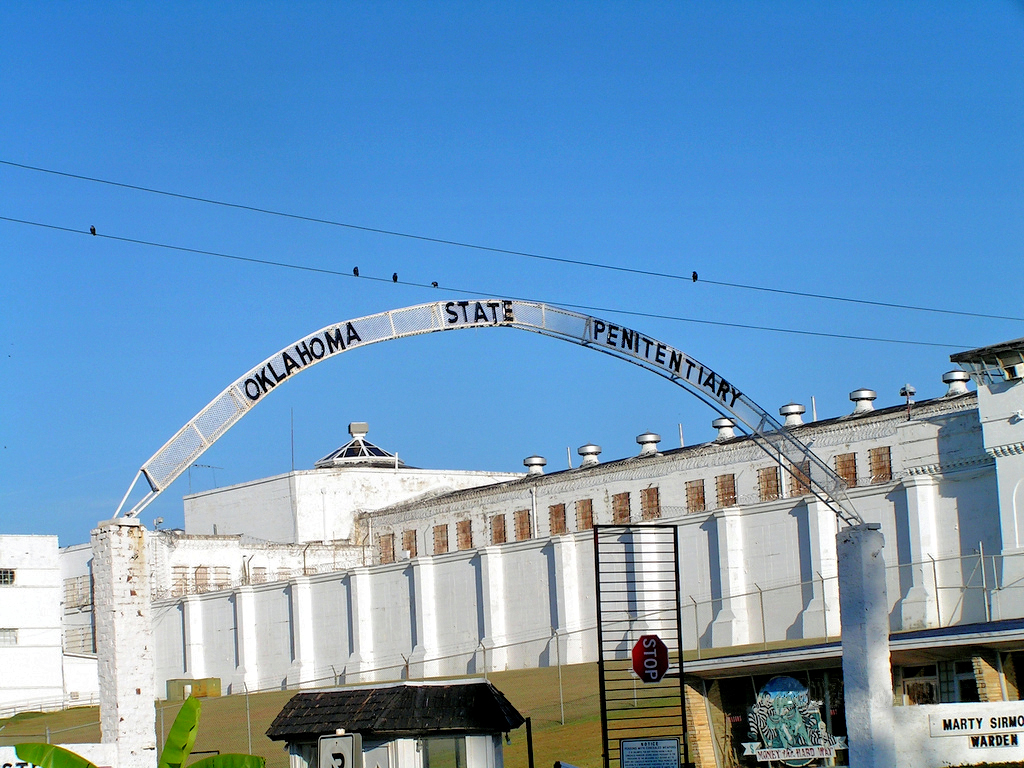
Oklahoma State Penitentiary, the location of the execution chamber of Oklahoma

Lockett's execution occurred at Oklahoma State Penitentiary in McAlester, Oklahoma, on April 29, 2014. Lockett refused to cooperate with his execution and had to be tasered by staff and also attempted to cut himself earlier that day. A paramedic tried twice to put an IV needle into Lockett's left arm but failed. She then tried to insert the needle into his brachial vein in his biceps but also failed. She asked for help from a doctor in attendance, Johnny Zellmer, who tried three times to get the IV into the jugular vein in Lockett's neck but failed. He then tried the subclavian vein adjacent to Lockett's collar bone but failed again. The paramedic tried two veins in the left foot but failed. Zellmer then inserted the needle into the femoral vein in the groin.

The execution began at 6:23 p.m. CDT, when the first drug midazolam (sedative), was administered. After Lockett was declared unconscious at 6:33 p.m., the next two drugs, vecuronium bromide (paralytic) and potassium chloride (to stop the heart beating), were injected. However, at 6:36 p.m., three minutes after being declared unconscious, Lockett started to struggle violently and was able to raise his head and speak, saying "Oh, man", "I'm not..." and according to some sources "something's wrong". He attempted to rise from the table at 6:37 p.m. and loudly exhaled. A lawyer for Lockett reportedly said, "It looked like torture." Oklahoma Department of Corrections Director Robert Patton said one of the doctors present stopped the execution when it became clear Lockett had a "vein failure". The execution was called off at 6:56 p.m by corrections director Robert Patton. Lockett was declared dead at 7:06 p.m. due to a heart attack. No life-saving measures were given to Lockett, according to the paramedic.

A subsequent investigation found that all three drugs had been properly administered to Lockett. However, it was a cloth, which had been placed over Lockett's groin to prevent witnesses from viewing the area, that had stopped staff from spotting that the IV connection in the groin had failed because of the collapsed vein. After an attending doctor stated that Lockett had not received enough of the drugs to cause death and there were not enough of the drugs left to attempt to continue, the execution was halted after 33 minutes. Prison officials reportedly discussed taking Lockett to a hospital before he died of a heart attack. Patton stated "the chemicals did not enter into the offender". The report noted:

The doctor checked the IV and reported the blood vein had collapsed, and the drugs had either absorbed into tissue, leaked out or both. [...] Patton asked if enough drugs had been administered to cause death, to which the doctor replied “no”. The director then asked if another vein was available to complete the execution, and if so, were there enough drugs left. The doctor answered no to both questions.

According to the Department of Corrections, the time for an inmate to be pronounced dead was 6 to 12 minutes in the previous 19 executions before Lockett. The execution of Lockett took 43 minutes.

== Aftermath ==
Following Lockett's death, a fourteen-day stay of execution was granted for Charles Frederick Warner, an Oklahoma convict who had been scheduled for execution two hours after Lockett with the same combination of drugs. Governor of Oklahoma Mary Fallin also requested a review of the execution process involved in Lockett's death. Fallin's intervention led to the execution which possibly violated separation of powers within the state. Warner ultimately was executed on January 15, 2015.

Dean Sanderford, Lockett's lawyer, witnessed the execution and expressed concern that "the planned review would not be independent". Sanderford feared "investigation by state employees or agencies would not restore confidence in the execution process". Lawyers representing the next set of prisoners scheduled to be executed called for a moratorium on all executions. Madeline Cohen, an attorney for Warner, condemned the way Lockett was executed, noting that "Clayton Lockett was tortured to death," also denouncing the state's refusal to disclose "basic information" about the drugs for the lethal injection procedures. Democratic state representative Joe Dorman called for outside investigation into how Lockett died. He feared the planned review could “lead to suppression of critical evidence in the unlikely event that criminal wrongdoing is uncovered.”

A timeline issued by Robert Patton, director of the Oklahoma Department of Corrections, revealed that Clayton Lockett, initially scared of his execution, refused to leave his cell when guards came to collect him. He tried jamming the door to he cell shut, and even tried to tie a noose to hang himself. He was tasered after refusing to be restrained and escorted to a medical room for an X-ray exam as part of the protocol leading up to his execution. During his medical exam, officials found a cut on his right arm, but staff determined that sutures were not needed. The timeline also revealed that Lockett refused a food tray twice. Patton also recommended in the letter to governor Mary Fallin that the state conduct a complete review of execution protocols, indefinitely suspend all executions, and investigate the circumstances surrounding the execution.

The White House said the execution "fell short of humane standards". President Barack Obama declared the action "deeply disturbing" and ordered attorney general Eric Holder to review the policy on executions. Obama cited uneven application of the death penalty in the United States, including racial bias (Lockett was African-American) and cases in which murder convictions were later overturned, as grounds for further study of the issue.

Media coverage portrayed the execution as "botched", The Telegraph calling it "barbarism" and "inappropriate in a civilized society", noting "the idea of actually spectating while the victim is killed surely clashes with basic humanity."

The executive director of the Death Penalty Information Center, Richard Dieter, said the attempted execution of Lockett was a “torturous action” and might "lead to a halt in executions until states can prove they can do it without problems". Due to the seriousness of the case, he said that death penalty advocates were "likely concerned about whether the state knows what it is doing".

The Office of the United Nations High Commissioner for Human Rights suggested that the execution may have been "cruel, inhuman and degrading treatment" according to international law and may have been cruel and unusual punishment under the Constitution of the United States. The government of the United Kingdom issued a statement reiterating its opposition to capital punishment through its embassy in Washington. It said "its use undermines human dignity, there is no conclusive evidence of its deterrent value, and any miscarriage of justice leading to its imposition is irreversible and irreparable" and called on the United States to cease its use.

Human rights organizations also condemned the killing and called on the government to end using it. Ryan Kiesel, the executive director of the American Civil Liberties Union of Oklahoma, said that by using a “science experiment” to cause Lockett to "die in pain" over the course of more than 40 minutes, the state had “disgraced itself before the nation and world”. US advocacy director of Human Rights Watch Antonio Ginatta said "people convicted of crimes should not be test subjects for a state’s grisly experiments" and that the "botched execution was nothing less than state-sanctioned torture".

The people of Perry, Oklahoma, where the murder of Stephanie Neiman had taken place, had little remorse upon hearing about what happened during Lockett's execution. One resident said "Even though the execution was botched, he didn't suffer anything compared to what he did to her [Stephanie Neiman]."

A month after the execution Oklahoma state had not released the official log of the incident. Oklahoma State University professor and freedom of information campaigner Joey Senat said, “They’re not complying with the law by this kind of delay.”

Lockett's lawyers released the preliminary results of an independent autopsy on Lockett, conducted by forensic pathologist Joseph Cohen and commissioned by Lockett's legal team. It suggested that the execution team failed to ensure the IV had been properly inserted. According to Cohen, the execution team made several attempts to insert IVs into Lockett's arms and groin before inserting an IV in his femoral vein. However, they failed to ensure the IV went in all the way, resulting in the drugs being absorbed into Lockett's muscle. The report also challenged the official claim that Lockett's veins failed, saying that his veins were perfectly healthy.

== See also ==
- Ángel Nieves Díaz – botched execution in Florida
- Capital punishment in Oklahoma
- Christa Pike – botched execution attempt in Tennessee
- Crime in Oklahoma
- Doyle Hamm – botched execution attempt in Alabama
- Execution of John Grant
- Execution of Jeffrey Landrigan
- Execution of Dennis McGuire
- Execution of Joseph Wood
- List of botched executions
- List of people executed in Oklahoma
- List of people executed in the United States in 2014

== Notes ==
Executions carried out in Oklahoma
Preceded by Kenneth Eugene Hogan January 23, 2014	Clayton Derrell Lockett; April 29, 2014	Succeeded by Charles Frederick Warner January 15, 2015
Executions carried out in the United States
Preceded by Robert Eugene Hendrix – Florida April 23, 2014	Clayton Derrell Lockett – Oklahoma; April 29, 2014	Succeeded by Marcus Alfonso Wellons – Georgia June 17, 2014
