= Oklahoma Girl Scout murders =

Unsolved 1977 murder of three girls in Oklahoma

Oklahoma Girl Scout Murders
- Date: June 13, 1977
- Location: Camp Scott, Mayes County, Oklahoma, U.S.; 36.162006°N 95.166355°W
- Cause: Homicide by strangulation
- Participants: 1
- Outcome: Unsolved
- Deaths: Lori Lee Farmer, age 8; Michele Heather Guse, age 9; Doris Denise Milner, age 10
- Suspects: Gene Leroy Hart
- Verdict: Not guilty
- Convictions: None

The Oklahoma Girl Scout murders took place on the morning of June 13, 1977, at Camp Scott in Mayes County, Oklahoma, United States. The victims were three Girl Scouts, between the ages of 8 and 10, who were raped and murdered. Their bodies were then left on a trail leading to the campsite's showers, about 150 yards (140 meters) from their tent. The case was classified as solved when Gene Leroy Hart, a local jail escapee with a history of violence and rape, was arrested. However, Hart was acquitted in March 1979 after a jury unanimously returned a verdict of not guilty.

Less than two months before the murders, during an on-site training session, a counselor at Camp Scott discovered that her belongings had been ransacked and her doughnuts had been stolen. Inside the empty doughnut box was a hand-written note, stating in capital letters, "We are on a mission to kill three girls in tent one." The director of that camp session treated the note as a prank, and it was discarded. After the murders, this incident gained attention as possibly being performed by the killer.

DNA testing of samples believed to come from the killer was performed in 1989, but results were inconclusive. The DNA profile could not be linked to an individual, but was rather associated with about 1 in every 7,700 Native Americans. As Hart was a member of the Cherokee Nation, he could not be ruled out. More advanced DNA testing performed in 2017 strongly suggested Hart's involvement in the crime, though the case remains officially unsolved and Hart died in 1979.

== Discovery of the bodies ==
At around 7 p.m. on Sunday, June 12, 1977, the night before camp started, the girls huddled in their tents. Among them were Lori Lee Farmer (8), Doris Denise Milner (10), and Michele Heather Guse (9). The girls were all residents of Broken Arrow, Oklahoma, a suburb of Tulsa. They were sharing tent #7 in the camp's "Kiowa" unit, which was located the farthest from the camp counselors' tent and partially obscured by the camp's showers.

At around 6 a.m. on June 13, a camp counselor on her way to the shower saw a girl's body in her sleeping bag in a wooded area just outside the tent area. It was discovered that all three girls from tent #7 were missing. As counselors began searching, they discovered the girls from tent #7 had been murdered. Two bodies were inside a sleeping bag, crumpled towards the bottom of the bag, and one body was visible on the outside. They had been left on a trail leading to the showers, about 150 yards from their tent. Subsequent testing showed that they had been bludgeoned and strangled. All three girls had been raped.

A large, red flashlight was found near the girls' bodies; a smudged fingerprint was found on the lens, but it has never been identified as it was too smudged for a positive identification. A footprint from a 9.5 size shoe was also found in the blood in the tent. Between 2:30 and 3 a.m. on June 13, a landowner reported hearing "quite a bit" of traffic on a remote road near the camp.

== Aftermath ==
Camp Scott was evacuated and was later shut down.

=== Suspect ===
Gene Leroy "Sonny" Hart (November 27, 1943 – June 4, 1979) had been at large since 1973 after escaping from the Mayes County Jail. He had been convicted of kidnapping and raping two pregnant women, as well as four counts of first-degree burglary. Raised about a mile from Camp Scott, Hart, a member of the Cherokee Nation, was captured and arrested in April 1978 at the home of a Cherokee medicine man. He was represented by Garvin A. Isaacs, a local Oklahoma attorney. He was tried in March 1979. Although the local sheriff pronounced himself "one thousand percent" certain that Hart was guilty, a local jury acquitted him. As a convicted rapist and jail escapee, Hart still had 305 years of his 308-year sentence left to serve in the Oklahoma State Penitentiary.

On June 4, 1979, two years after the murders, Hart collapsed and died of a heart attack at the age of 35 after about an hour of lifting weights and jogging in the prison exercise yard.

=== Civil suit ===
Two of the families later sued the Magic Empire Council and its insurer for $5 million (equivalent to $15 million in 2025), alleging negligence. The civil trial included discussion of the threatening note and the fact that tent #7 was 86 yards (79 m) from the counselors' tent. In 1985, by a 9–3 vote, jurors decided in favor of Magic Empire.

=== DNA testing ===
In 1989, DNA testing was conducted that showed three of the five probes matched Hart's DNA. Statistically, DNA from 1 in 7,700 Native Americans would obtain these results. In 2008, authorities conducted new DNA testing on stains found on a pillowcase, the results of which proved inconclusive because the samples were "too deteriorated to obtain a DNA profile". In 2017, $30,000 (equivalent to $39,404 in 2025) in donations were raised by the sheriff in order to do new DNA tests using the latest advances in testing. In 2022, authorities made public that DNA evidence strongly suggests Hart's involvement. Sheriff Mike Reed of Mayes County said, "Unless something new comes up, something brought to light we are not aware of, I am convinced where I'm sitting of Hart's guilt and involvement in this case." Reed said the results of the DNA tests have been known since 2019, but did not go public with the findings until asked to do so by the victims' families.

== Legacy ==
Richard Guse, the father of one of the three victims, went on to help the state legislature pass the Oklahoma Victims' Bill of Rights. He also helped found the Oklahoma Crime Victims Compensation Board.

Another parent, Sheri Farmer, founded the Oklahoma chapter of Parents of Murdered Children, a support group.

As a result of the Supreme Court case, McGirt v. Oklahoma (2021), which determined that crimes involving Cherokee natives on Cherokee lands in Oklahoma fell under tribal rather than state sovereignty, new details about the killings are being investigated by the Cherokee Nation.

=== Documentaries ===
A 1993 documentary called Someone Cry for The Children: The Girl Scout Murders, based on the book of the same name by Michael and Dick Wilkerson, was released. The documentary is narrated by Dale Robertson and Johnny Cash. It was directed by Michael Wilkerson.

A four-part ABC News documentary series, titled Keeper of the Ashes: The Oklahoma Girl Scout Murders, about the case was released on Hulu on May 24, 2022, a few weeks before the 45th anniversary of the crimes. It is hosted by actress and singer Kristin Chenoweth, who was an 8-year-old Girl Scout in 1977 and had planned to go on the camping trip but became ill and did not attend.

== See also ==
- Crime in Oklahoma
- List of murdered American children
- List of unsolved murders (1900–1979)
- Murder of Marcia Trimble

== Bibliography ==
- Wilkerson, Michael; Wilkerson, Dick (1981). Someone Cry for the Children: The Unsolved Oklahoma Girl Scout Murders and the Case of Gene Leroy Hart. New York: Doubleday. ISBN 0-385-27152-2.
- McCoy, Gloyd (2011). Tent Number Eight: An Investigation of the Girl Scout Murders & the Trial of Gene Leroy Hart. Tate Publishing & Enterprises, LLC. ISBN 978-1-61777-632-8.
- Kelly, C.S. (2014). The Camp Scott Murders: The 1977 Girl Scout Murders. CreateSpace Independent Publishing. ISBN 978-1-5001-5735-7.
