= Karl Myers =

American murderer and suspected serial killer

- 2011 mugshot of Myers
- Born: Karl Lee Myers; March 29, 1948; Picher, Oklahoma, U.S.
- Died: December 28, 2012 (aged 64); Oklahoma State Penitentiary, McAlester, Oklahoma, U.S.
- Convictions: First-degree murder x2 First-degree rape Burglary
- Penalty: Death ×2 (murders); 20 years (rape); 14 months (burglary)

Details
- Victims: 2–7+
- Span of crimes: 1993 – 1996 (confirmed); 1978 – 1996 (suspected)
- Country: United States
- States: Oklahoma (confirmed); Kansas (suspected)
- Date apprehended: March 16, 1996

Karl Lee Myers (March 29, 1948 – December 28, 2012) was an American murderer, rapist, and suspected serial killer. Convicted and sentenced to death for two separate murders in Oklahoma, committed in 1993 and 1996 respectively, he was also acquitted of a 1978 killing in Kansas and remained a suspect in several other murders. Myers remained on death row for the remainder of his life, dying behind bars in 2012 without being executed.

== Early life and crimes ==
Karl Lee Myers was born on March 29, 1948, in Picher, Oklahoma. Reportedly suffering from organic brain damage since birth, he was struck by a car in 1953, leading to the formation of a blood clot that caused him to suffer from severe headaches and nervousness for the rest of his life. Myers' mother, described as a possessive woman who made all the major decisions for him, frequently brought various boyfriends to the house who then emotionally and physically abused the young boy in drunken stupors. In later interviews, Myers' sister would claim that he was functionally illiterate and struggled with learning, due to which he was bullied by his peers and even his teachers – according to her, one teacher even called her "the retard's sister".

Myers' first conviction dates back to 1965, when he was arrested on a grand larceny charge in Miami, Oklahoma, followed by a 1969 burglary charge in Sedalia, Missouri, for which he served 14 months in prison. In 1976, he attacked and attempted to sexually assault a 12-year-old girl in his hometown, and later sexually assaulted a 13-year-old relative. Two years later, he was arrested in Columbus, Kansas for the 1976 charge and held on $15,000 bond pending extradition to Oklahoma. Myers was eventually extradited, stood trial and was successfully convicted, resulting in a 20-year sentence for rape.

=== Rowden case ===
On August 1, 1977, Myers was at a bar in Picher with several other people when he came across 23-year-old Ellen Deann Rowden. It is unclear what exactly transpired, but Rowden was never seen alive again – her skeletal remains were discovered near Treece, Kansas in April 1978. Her cause of death was determined to be blunt force trauma to the head.

In 1978, Myers contacted the authorities and implicated two people in the murder – Rowden's brother-in-law, Leslie, and a friend named Imogene Butterbaugh. He claimed that on the night of her disappearance, the pair had killed Rowden and then slept on a chat pile near her body. After voluntarily undergoing psychological stress testing, Myers was transferred to Kansas to testify against Rowden and Butterbaugh, but as some considered him to be unreliable, copies of his testimony were sent to a professional laboratory for analysis. The claims were determined to be false, resulting in the charges against Rowden and Butterbaugh being dropped due to a lack of evidence, while Myers was charged with first-degree murder.

Not long after, Myers accused another person of participating in the crime – Charles "Chink" Enders, an acquaintance who was also charged with first-degree murder. However, Myers was acquitted due to a lack of evidence and returned to Oklahoma to continue serving his sentence for rape, and as his allegations against Enders were also deemed unreliable, charges against him were dropped as well, leaving the Rowden case to go officially unsolved. Enders himself would be killed not long after, with Myers claiming that he witnessed the murder years later, but could not be charged as he had been granted legal immunity.

== 1990s murders and arrest ==
On April 13, 1993, 22-year-old Shawn Marie Williams was reported missing to police officials in Catoosa after she went to a nearby convenience store, but never returned. Her pickup truck was found abandoned along U.S. Route 412, but there was no sign of Williams herself. For the next three days, authorities and volunteers tried to track her down, only to find her body in some swampy marshes near Rocky Point. A forensic autopsy determined that Williams had been extensively beaten and raped, and that her killer had shot her five times, with one of the bullets fired into the chest rupturing her aorta. Her murder quickly garnered attention from the media, as it was yet another in an unrelated series of murders of motorists that had plagued the area since the 1970s.

Williams' murder went unsolved until three years later when it was linked to Myers after his arrest for an unrelated killing. On March 14, 1996, the body of 29-year-old Cindy Michelle Marzano was found in the Verdigris River, showing signs of sexual assault and strangulation. Myers was identified as the prime suspect within a day of the murder, as multiple witnesses had seen him pick Marzano up from her workplace at a delicatessen in Broken Arrow. An investigation by detectives revealed that he had violated his parole by keeping a firearm – which he was prohibited from doing as a convicted felon – and was then lodged into a county jail. He was ordered to provide a DNA sample, and since Marzano's murder seemed eerily similar to Williams', investigators decided to compare them just in case. Myers came back as a positive match for both, and he was then charged with both women's murders.

Due to his previous violent crimes and the 1978 acquittal in the Rowden case, investigators suspected that he might be responsible for more killings than the ones he was charged with. While he was awaiting trial, representatives from several state and government agencies gathered at a meeting in Claremore to compare notes. Following this, he was labeled as a potential suspect in a string of sexually motivated murders spanning the states of Oklahoma, Kansas and Arkansas, but was never charged with any of them.

== Trials and imprisonment ==
From the beginning, it was decided that Myers should stand separate trials for the two murders, beginning with the murder of Marzano. Prosecutors used his own statements against him, pointing out that he initially denied even knowing Marzano when arrested by officers, but later on told a former sheriff that he had had sex with her on numerous occasions. Due to the overwhelming amount of evidence against him, the jury deliberated for only two and a half hours before returning a guilty verdict. In March 1998, he was officially sentenced to death.

Myers' second trial began on January 25, 2000. Throughout the proceedings, prosecutors focused primarily on the DNA evidence, as their other evidence was mostly circumstantial. In response, Myers' attorneys argued that their client was mentally ill due to his low IQ and organic brain damage, thus rendering him ineligible for execution. In the end, the jury found Myers guilty on all charges and concluded that should be given a second death sentence for Williams' murder.

=== Appeals ===
In October 2003, Myers' attorneys issued an appeal to the Oklahoma Court of Criminal Appeals, using similar arguments to those in his initial trials that he was mentally ill and should not be executed. The following month, Myers was one of nearly half a dozen inmates who were granted new hearings by the Court of Criminal Appeals, with his trial being scheduled for 2004.

Subsequently, the jury at said trial dismissed his claims of mental illness, with the judges denied his request for post-conviction relief. A follow-up appeal was also rejected by the Oklahoma Court of Criminal Appeals, which upheld the lower court's verdict.

== Death and aftermath ==
On December 28, 2012, guards found an unresponsive Myers inside the medical sector of the Oklahoma State Penitentiary and notified medical personnel. A short time afterwards, he was pronounced dead of suspected natural causes.

=== Suspected murders ===
As of March 2025, no further murders or other violent crimes have been conclusively linked to Myers. At one point, he was accused of perpetrating the Oklahoma Girl Scout murders by cellmate John Russell, who made a movie about the case, but this accusation has been largely regarded as without merit. Myers has been eliminated as a suspect and the murders are now believed to have likely been the work of Gene Leroy Hart, but they officially remain unsolved. Some have also speculated he might be responsible for the murders of several women in Joplin and Rolla, Missouri, but local authorities have claimed that they have no evidence implicating Myers in any cases in their jurisdiction.

Below is a list of known murders and disappearances Myers has been accused of and never officially ruled out as a suspect:

Type of crime	Date	Location	Victim	Notes
Murder	October 17, 1974	Quapaw, Oklahoma	Tina Duffell	Body found submerged in a mining pond. Myers lived in the area at the time.
Murder	1977 (exact date unknown)	Treece, Kansas	Julia Miller	14-year-old who vanished at an undetermined date from Picher and whose bones were found in the same area as Rowden. Investigators have stated that Myers is their "No. 1 Suspect".
Murder	August 1, 1977	Treece, Kansas	Ellen Deann Rowden	Myers was charged, but acquitted in this case. Investigators from both Kansas and Oklahoma have stated that they still believe he was responsible.
Murder	August 1978	Baxter Springs, Kansas	Charles E. "Chink" Enders	Skeletal remains found in a caved-in mine shaft. Myers claimed he was an eyewitness to the murder, but could not be charged as he was granted immunity from prosecution.
Disappearance	August 19, 1993	Pittsburg, Kansas	Ginger Hudson	Last seen leaving her residence, but never returned.

== See also ==
- Capital punishment in Oklahoma
- Oklahoma Girl Scout murders
