= Lewis Gilbert (disambiguation) =

Lewis Gilbert (1920–2018) was a British filmmaker.

Lewis Gilbert may also refer to:

- Lewis Gilbert (actor) (1862–1925), British actor of the silent era
- Lewis Gilbert (American football) (born 1956), American football tight end
- Lewis Gilbert (racing driver) (born 2004), British racing driver
- Lewis Eugene Gilbert (1971–2003), American spree killer

== See also ==
- Louis Gilbert (1906–1987), American football halfback
- Gilbert Lewis (disambiguation)
