= Gilbert Postelle =

American man convicted of murder and executed

- Postelle's 2008 Mugshot
- Born: Gilbert Ray Postelle; June 22, 1986; Oklahoma, U.S.
- Died: February 17, 2022 (aged 35); Oklahoma State Penitentiary, McAlester, Oklahoma, U.S.
- Cause of death: Execution by lethal injection
- Spouse: Veronica Gale Ward (m. 2017; div. 2020)
- Convictions: First degree murder (4 counts); Conspiracy to commit a felony
- Penalty: Death (October 2008)

Details
- Victims: 4
- Date: May 30, 2005
- Country: United States
- State: Oklahoma
- Weapons: SKS, MAK-90

Gilbert Ray Postelle (June 22, 1986 – February 17, 2022) was an American mass murderer who was sentenced to death and executed for his involvement in a quadruple murder in Oklahoma. He was executed on February 17, 2022, by lethal injection.

== Early life ==
Postelle was abandoned by his mother at a young age and later began using methamphetamine on a daily basis. Postelle was arrested at least eight times in Midwest City related to drug manufacturing and weapons complaints. His father, Earl Bradford "Brad" Postelle, had a 1996 drug conviction and, in 1999, was suspected of manufacturing methamphetamine in an old school bus behind his home. Brad Postelle was charged with endeavoring to manufacture meth and drug possession, but the charges later were dropped.

== Crime ==
On May 30, 2005, Memorial Day, Postelle, his brother David Postelle, father Brad Postelle, and another man, Randall Wade Byus, shot and killed four people in a "blitz attack" at a home in Oklahoma City. The victims were Donnie Swindle, James Alderson, Terry Smith, and Amy Wright. Prior to the attack, Brad Postelle was involved in a motorcycle crash and was seriously injured, receiving a brain injury resulting in seizures. The shooting was motivated by Postelle's belief that Swindle was responsible for the motorcycle accident despite there being no evidence for his involvement. The victims were marched into the yard outside a trailer home complex, where they were told to kneel. During the attack, Postelle shot over thirty rounds from an AK-47 rifle, striking all four victims. Wright and Alderson tried to flee, and Postelle shot them from behind.

On July 7, detectives tracked a maroon van, similar to one seen in surveillance footage leaving the crime scene, to Terre Haute, Indiana, where it was found. Avis Sanders told police he and Daniel Ashcraft drove the van to Indiana. Police recovered trace evidence from the van.

David Postelle and Brad Postelle were arrested on August 16, 2005, and Gilbert Postelle was arrested on August 17, 2005. Sanders, Ashcroft, and Arthur James Wilder were also arrested and charged with accessory to murder.

Postelle received a jury trial. In 2008, Postelle was sentenced to two death sentences, one for the killing of Wright and one for the killing of Alderson, and to life without the possibility of parole for Swindle and Smith's deaths. Postelle's brother, David, was sentenced to life in prison without the possibility of parole. His father, Brad, was declared incompetent to stand trial due to injuries resulting from the motorcycle accident. Brad Postelle died on February 18, 2011, aged 46. Byus received a plea deal in exchange for testifying against Postelle.

== Post-conviction proceedings ==
In December 2011, the Oklahoma Court of Criminal Appeals upheld the death penalty for Postelle.

In February 2020, more than two dozen inmates, including Postelle, filed a motion to reopen the 2014 lawsuit, Glossip v. Chandler after the state announced plans to resume executions, claiming the new lethal injection protocol was incomplete. Several botched executions had resulted in a moratorium from 2015 to 2021. The lawsuit claims there is autopsy evidence suggesting that the drugs used in lethal injection make people feel as though they are drowning through a "flash pulmonary edema" and like they are being "burned alive". In August 2021, United States District Court for the Western District of Oklahoma Judge Stephen Friot ruled that because six inmates, including Postelle, had not specified an alternative execution method to lethal injection, they could no longer be included in the lawsuit. Postelle had refused to choose an alternative method of execution based on religious grounds. Following Postelle's removal from the lawsuit, the Oklahoma Court of Criminal Appeals set Gilbert Postelle's execution. On October 15, 2021, United States Court of Appeals for the Tenth Circuit ruled that the lower court made a mistake by dismissing the six prisoners from the lawsuit.

Following the botched execution of John Grant in October 2021, Postelle, along with four other Oklahoma death row inmates who had scheduled execution dates, Julius Jones, Wade Lay, and Donald Grant, sued for an injunction arguing that Oklahoma officials had not resolved concerns about the state's execution method. In November 2021, the United States Court of Appeals for the Tenth Circuit rejected the inmates' request to intervene.

In December 2021, Postelle had a clemency hearing. At the hearing, Postelle's lawyer, Robert Nance, argued that he had a learning disability with an IQ in the low 70s and told the Oklahoma Pardon and Parole Board "I think he needs a certain amount of forgiveness because he grew up in an environment that was almost exclusively negative." Postelle testified that he had been using methamphetamine for days before the crimes and said he did not remember much about the crimes. His attorney argued that he was strongly influenced by his father, who was suffering from a brain injury, at the time of the crime. Postelle stated "I do understand that I'm guilty and I accept that. There's nothing more that I know to say to you all than I am truly sorry for what I've done to all these families." Mary Joe Swindle, Donnie Swindle's mother, testified that she never got to see Swindle's body because it was so "riddled and torn with bullets." The Pardon and Parole Board voted 4–1 to deny clemency for Postelle. Oklahoma Attorney General John M. O'Connor stated that he was grateful the Pardon and Parole Board denied Postelle's request.

In January 2022, Postelle and other death row inmates in Oklahoma asked Judge Friot of the United States District Court for the Western District of Oklahoma to grant them a temporary injunction that would halt their executions until a trial could be held over the constitutionality of the three-drug lethal injection method. The trial was scheduled for February 28, 2022, after the scheduled execution dates of the four inmates. At the time of the request for an injunction, Postelle and Donald Grant, another death row inmate, offered to be executed by firing squad instead of lethal injection.

The United States Supreme Court refused to grant Postelle a stay of execution.

== Execution ==
Postelle's last meal was McDonalds, which included 20 chicken nuggets, three large fries, two chicken sandwiches, one large cola, and one caramel frappe. Postelle was executed by lethal injection and was pronounced dead at 10:14 a.m. CST. Postelle declined to give any last words.

== Personal life ==
Gilbert married Veronica Gale Ward of Oklahoma City, Oklahoma in 2017 at the Oklahoma State Penitentiary. A pastor from the Light of God Church in Oklahoma City performed the ceremony, according to the marriage certificate. They divorced in 2020 but remained friends. At the time of his execution, he was engaged to Jackie Thompson.

== See also ==
- List of people executed in Oklahoma
- List of people executed in the United States in 2022

Executions carried out in Oklahoma
Preceded by Donald Anthony Grant January 27, 2022	Gilbert Postelle; February 17, 2022	Succeeded by James Allen Coddington August 25, 2022
Executions carried out in the United States
Preceded by Matthew Reeves – Alabama January 27, 2022	Gilbert Postelle – Oklahoma; February 17, 2022	Succeeded by Carl Wayne Buntion – Texas April 21, 2022
