= List of people executed in the United States in 2022 =

Eighteen people, all male, were executed in the United States in 2022, all by lethal injection.

== List of people executed in the United States in 2022 ==
No.	Date of execution	Name	Age of person			Gender	Ethnicity	State	Method	Ref.
No.	Date of execution	Name	At execution	At offense	Age difference	Gender	Ethnicity	State	Method	Ref.
1	January 27, 2022	Donald Anthony Grant	46	25	21	Male	Black	Oklahoma	Lethal injection	
2	January 27, 2022	Matthew Reeves	44	18	26	Male	Black	Alabama	Lethal injection	
3	February 17, 2022	Gilbert Ray Postelle	35	18	17	Male	White	Oklahoma	Lethal injection	
4	April 21, 2022	Carl Wayne Buntion	78	46	32	Male	White	Texas	Lethal injection	
5	May 3, 2022	Carman Lee Deck Jr.	56	30	26	Male	White	Missouri	Lethal injection	
6	May 11, 2022	Clarence Wayne Dixon	66	22	44	Male	Native American	Arizona	Lethal injection	
7	June 8, 2022	Frank Jarvis Atwood	66	28	38	Male	White	Arizona	Lethal injection	
8	July 28, 2022	Joe Nathan James Jr.	50	22	28	Male	Black	Alabama	Lethal injection	
9	August 17, 2022	Kosoul Chanthakoummane	41	25	16	Male	Asian	Texas	Lethal injection	
10	August 25, 2022	James Allen Coddington	50	24	26	Male	White	Oklahoma	Lethal injection	
11	October 5, 2022	John Henry Ramirez	38	20	18	Male	Hispanic	Texas	Lethal injection	
12	October 20, 2022	Benjamin Robert Cole Sr.	57	37	20	Male	White	Oklahoma	Lethal injection	
13	November 9, 2022	Tracy Lane Beatty	61	42	19	Male	White	Texas	Lethal injection	
14	November 16, 2022	Murray Hooper	76	35	41	Male	Black	Arizona	Lethal injection	
15	November 16, 2022	Stephen Dale Barbee	55	37	18	Male	White	Texas	Lethal injection	
16	November 17, 2022	Richard Stephen Fairchild	63	33	30	Male	White	Oklahoma	Lethal injection	
17	November 29, 2022	Kevin Johnson Jr.	37	19	18	Male	Black	Missouri	Lethal injection	
18	December 14, 2022	Thomas Edwin Loden Jr.	58	35	23	Male	White	Mississippi	Lethal injection	
		Average:	54 years	29 years	26 years					

== Demographics ==
Gender
Male	18	100%
Female	0	0%
Ethnicity
White	10	56%
Black	5	28%
Asian	1	6%
Hispanic	1	6%
Native American	1	6%
State
Oklahoma	5	28%
Texas	5	28%
Arizona	3	17%
Alabama	2	11%
Missouri	2	11%
Mississippi	1	6%
Method
Lethal injection	18	100%
Month
January	2	11%
February	1	6%
March	0	0%
April	1	6%
May	2	11%
June	1	6%
July	1	6%
August	2	11%
September	0	0%
October	2	11%
November	5	28%
December	1	6%
Age
30–39	3	17%
40–49	3	17%
50–59	6	33%
60–69	4	22%
70–79	2	11%
Total	18	100%

== Executions in recent years ==
Number of executions
2023	24
2022	18
2021	11
Total	53

== See also ==
- List of death row inmates in the United States
- List of juveniles executed in the United States since 1976
- List of most recent executions by jurisdiction
- List of people executed in Texas, 2020–present
- List of women executed in the United States since 1976

Preceded by 2021	List of people executed in the United States in 2022	Succeeded by 2023
