= Gilbert Lewis =

Gilbert Lewis may refer to:

- Gilbert Lewis (actor) (1941–2015), American actor
- Gilbert N. Lewis (1875–1946), American chemist
- Sir Gilbert Lewis, 3rd Baronet of the Lewis baronets
- Gilbert Lewis (anthropologist), see 1980s in sociology

== See also ==
- Lewis Gilbert (disambiguation)
