= Execution of Joe Nathan James Jr. =

2022 execution by the state of Alabama

Joe James Jr.
- Born: Joe Nathan James Jr. July 25, 1972; United States
- Died: July 28, 2022 (aged 50); Holman Correctional Facility, Atmore, Alabama, U.S.
- Cause of death: Execution by lethal injection
- Conviction: Capital murder
- Penalty: Death

Details
- Victims: Faith Hall, 26
- Date: August 15, 1994
- State: Alabama

The execution of Joe Nathan James Jr. (July 25, 1972 – July 28, 2022) took place in the U.S. state of Alabama by means of lethal injection. James was sentenced to death for the 1994 murder of his ex-girlfriend, 26-year-old Faith Hall. His execution generated significant media attention and controversy due to a plea by the victim's family to spare his life and allegations that his execution would be botched.

== Background ==
=== Early life ===
Joe Nathan James Jr. was born on July 25, 1972. James was in a relationship with a woman, Faith Hall, a few years before the murder, their relationship would have lasted a year and a half or two according to Faith's brother. Prosecutors say that James became obsessed after Faith rejected him, stalking and harassing her for months before killing her. Court records show in the year prior to Faith's death, there were three harassment and one burglary police reports filed by Faith and her grandmother against James. The reports detailed James making threats to kill Faith, entering their home and damaging items, banging on windows, constant calling, and sitting in the home's driveway.

=== Murder ===
On August 15, 1994, Faith went shopping with a friend and returned to the friend's apartment before they realized James was following them. Faith, her friend, and her friend's children, climbed inside and tried to barricade the door. After James burst in, Faith initially tried to calm him down and steer the incident away from the children; however, he shot at her three times as she ran away. He then fired again after Faith had already collapsed.

== Trial, final appeals and execution ==
=== Trial ===
A Jefferson County jury convicted James of capital murder in 1996 and voted to recommend the death penalty, which a judge imposed. The conviction was overturned when the Alabama court of criminal appeals ruled that a judge wrongly admitted some police reports into evidence. James was retried and again sentenced to death in 1999, when jurors rejected defense claims that he was under emotional duress at the time of the shooting.

He converted to Islam while on death row.

=== Final appeals ===
In June and early July 2022, James filed several lawsuits in the U.S. District Court for the Southern District of Alabama against the state attorney general and numerous justice system officials. U.S. District Judge Terry F. Moorer considered issuing motions for a preliminary injunction in three of James' lawsuits. In his lawsuit, James claimed he was not given the opportunity to elect execution by nitrogen hypoxia, an untested method of execution. James, allegedly unaware that he could delay his execution by electing nitrogen hypoxia, said the treatment violated his right to equal protection under the 14th Amendment. However, a delay was denied.

James' defense was also based on the fact that Faith's family opposed the execution. It was reported that Faith's daughters, Toni Hall Melton and Terryln Hall, who were respectively 3 and 6 years old at the time of the murder, and her brother, Helvetius Hall, were interviewed by the media about the case. They said they had forgiven James, and asked that his death sentence be commuted to life without the possibility of parole.

=== Execution ===
The execution of James took place on July 28, 2022. He was scheduled to be executed at 6 p.m. but was not pronounced dead until 9:27 p.m making it possibly the longest execution in US history. Hall's daughters had planned to attend the execution, hear James' final words hoping for an apology, and then leave. However, ADOC officials told the Hall family that it would be impossible for them to leave, because of prison protocols. James did not open his eyes or show any deliberate movements at any point during the procedure, according to reporting from the Associated Press. He did not speak when asked if he had any final words. Witnesses of the execution cannot confirm that James was conscious at the time of his execution. According to the Alabama Corrections Commissioner, John Hamm, James was not sedated. It was also reported that a female journalist who was witnessing the execution had been told that her skirt was too short for her to enter the witness room during the execution procedure.

== Aftermath ==
=== Reaction ===
Hall's family did not attend the execution, but they did release a statement:

We hoped the state wouldn't take a life simply because a life was taken and we have forgiven Mr. Joe Nathan James Jr. for his atrocities toward our family.

The attorney General, Steve Marshall, stated that justice had been served.

The governor of Alabama, Kay Ivey, stated that "an unmistakable message was sent that Alabama stands with victims of domestic violence."

The sister of James, Yvette Craig, called for an investigation into the circumstances surrounding the execution warrant.

=== Autopsy ===
A private autopsy revealed puncture wounds and bruising around James' knuckles and wrists, which doctors say suggests members of the execution team had tried unsuccessfully to insert IV lines in those places. The autopsy also documented puncture wounds in James' musculature.

=== Moratorium ===
Following the execution of James, but also the failed execution attempts of Alan Eugene Miller and Kenneth Eugene Smith, Alabama Governor Kay Ivey called for a temporary halt to executions in the state. The moratorium ended and executions resumed on July 21, 2023, nearly a year after James's execution.

== See also ==
- Capital punishment in Alabama
- List of botched executions
- List of people executed in Alabama
- List of people executed in the United States in 2022

Executions carried out in Alabama
Preceded by Matthew Reeves January 27, 2022	Joe Nathan James Jr. July 28, 2022	Succeeded by James Edward Barber July 21, 2023
Executions carried out in the United States
Preceded by Frank Jarvis Atwood – Arizona June 8, 2022	Joe Nathan James Jr. – Alabama; July 28, 2022	Succeeded by Kosoul Chanthakoummane – Texas August 17, 2022
