= Deck v. Missouri =

- Supreme Court of the United States

Argued March 1, 2005 Decided May 23, 2005
- Full case name: Carman L. Deck v. State of Missouri
- Docket no.: 04-5293
- Citations: 544 U.S. 622 (more) 125 S. Ct. 2007; 161 L. Ed. 2d 953
- Argument: Oral argument

Case history
- Prior: Missouri Supreme Court upholds Deck's original death sentence, 994 S.W.2d 527 (1999). Three years later Deck's sentence is thrown out by the Missouri Supreme Court, 68 S.W.3d 418 (2002). Deck is sentenced to death again after being visibly shackled during this sentencing phase (2003). Missouri Supreme Court upheld this decision 136 S.W.3d 481 (2004).

Holding
- Unless the shackling pertains to a specific defendant for specific state interests, the Constitution forbids the shackling of a defendant in the sentencing phase of a trial.

Court membership
- Chief Justice William Rehnquist Associate Justices John P. Stevens · Sandra Day O'Connor; Antonin Scalia · Anthony Kennedy; David Souter · Clarence Thomas; Ruth Bader Ginsburg · Stephen Breyer

Case opinions
- Majority: Breyer, joined by Rehnquist, Stevens, O'Connor, Kennedy, Souter, Ginsburg
- Dissent: Thomas, joined by Scalia

Laws applied
- U.S. Const. amends. V, VI, VIII, XIV

Deck v. Missouri, 544 U.S. 622 (2005), was a United States Supreme Court case that dealt with the constitutionality of shackling a prisoner during the sentencing phase of a trial. In a 7–2 opinion delivered by Justice Breyer, the court held that it is against due process, a right prescribed by the Fifth and Fourteenth Amendments, to shackle a defendant in the sentencing portion of a trial unless the shackling relates to a specific defendant and certain state interests.

== Background ==
On August 27, 1996, Carman Deck (August 9, 1965 – May 3, 2022) was officially charged and arrested for six felonies. Among those felonies were a count of first-degree robbery, a count of first-degree burglary, two counts of armed criminal action, and two counts of first-degree murder. During the guilt phase of Deck's original trial, he was dressed as a normal citizen, but had leg-braces under his clothes. Deck's trial began on February 17, 1998, and within three days, he was convicted on all counts. After handing down a verdict, it took the jury only one additional day to sentence Deck to death. After the trial, Deck appealed to the Supreme Court of Missouri, where his conviction and sentence were upheld. However, Deck was later granted a new penalty phase after he appealed to the Supreme Court of Missouri on the grounds that he received ineffective assistance of counsel at sentencing.

The retry of Deck's penalty phase began on April 29, 2003, where he was brought into court wearing shackles. The defense objected to Deck being visibly restrained, stating that Deck's behavior did not justify shackles. The defense stated the only justification for shackling Deck would have been if he caused a disturbance in the courtroom. However, he did not. The defense also suggested other measures that the court could have taken to ensure safety instead of shackling Deck. These measures included adding extra security guards to the courtroom, and having the people who wanted to sit in the gallery walk through metal detectors. However, the defense's objections were overruled. Deck's attorneys once again objected during voir dire. Deck's defense thought that asking jurors if the shackles biased them was not enough to ensure that Deck would receive reliable sentencing. The court overruled the objection again, stating “The objection that you’re making will be overruled. He has been convicted and will remain in leg irons and belly chain.” The jury once again sentenced Deck to death.

Deck appealed to the Supreme Court of Missouri, arguing that the shackles infringed upon his right to due process, equal protection, right to confront evidence against him, and freedom from cruel and unusual punishment (prescribed from Fifth, Sixth, Eighth, and Fourteenth Amendments to the United States Constitution). The Missouri Supreme Court held that the trial court had standing to impose security measures if it was necessary. The Supreme Court of Missouri stated that Deck had committed murder and that he would run if he had the chance. Additionally, the court ruled that there was “no record of the extent of the jury’s awareness of the restraints throughout the penalty phase.” The Missouri Supreme Court concluded by stating that it was not claimed that the shackles prevented Deck from participating in the trial and that no evidence has been put forth to prove that it did.

=== Petitioner's argument ===
Deck and his attorneys submitted a Writ of Certiorari to the United States Supreme Court to try to get his death sentence thrown out. The Writ of Certiorari laid out Deck's arguments as to why the shackling was unconstitutional. Deck and his counsel claimed that some of Deck's basic constitutional rights were violated when he was shackled in open court.

Deck specifically claimed that his rights to due process, prescribed by the Fifth and Fourteenth Amendments, were violated. Deck's counsel made it clear that there was no reason such as a court disturbance to permit such shackling. In Deck's argument to the Supreme Court, it was also argued that Deck's Sixth Amendment rights had been violated on the grounds of the Confrontation Clause. Deck's shackling told the jury that Deck was dangerous and was shackled to protect the courtroom, resulting in what his attorneys referred to as prejudice towards Deck, i.e. the jury may have been influenced by these arbitrary details in deciding Deck's sentence, not just the presented facts. As a result, his right to confront witnesses as stated in the 6th Amendment (as well as the requirement of an impartial jury) were violated by the shackles. Deck's counsel argued that the shackles violated the defendant's rights that "give meaning to the defendant’s right to be present at his trial". It was argued that the shackles limited Deck from freely conversing with his counsel, and that they prevented him from taking the stand to defend himself. The defense wrote that this would increase the chances of Deck being sentenced to death by the jury which made the shackling unconstitutional.

Additionally Deck argued that his Eighth Amendment rights had been violated because of the idea of reliable sentencing. This also ties into the idea of a biased jury. According to justices Souter and Stevens’ concurring opinion in the case of Simmons v. South Carolina, the “Eight Amendment requires provision of accurate sentencing information as an indispensable prerequisite to a reasoned determination of whether a defendant shall live or die” (case from 1994). Deck's attorneys argued that since the jury considered arbitrary evidence, Deck's right to reliable sentencing had been violated.

Deck and his attorneys also argued about the burden of proof. Deck's counsel believed that the bias created by the shackles put the burden of proof on Deck and not the state. The defense argued that the state could not prove that the shackles did no harm. Ultimately, the defense felt that the shackling of Deck was not harmless beyond a reasonable doubt, meaning shackling made a difference in the decision that the jury made. The defense argued that this alone was a violation against the constitution and due process.

=== Amicus curiae briefs ===
An amicus curiae brief was filed by Thomas H. Speedy Rice on behalf of the Bar Human Rights Committee of England and Wales and the National Association of Criminal Defense Lawyers on behalf of Deck (petitioner).

In their brief, the Bar of Human Rights Committee and the National Association of Criminal Defense Lawyers argued that the shackling of Deck was a human rights violation. It was also argued that the shackles violated due process and common law and that the shackles diminished courtroom dignity. Additionally, it was argued that the shackles contributed to self-incrimination, and prevented Deck from confronting witnesses against him.

A brief was filed by the state of California by “Bill Lockyer, Attorney General of California, Manuel M. Medeiros, State Solicitor General, Robert R. Anderson, Chief Assistant Attorney General, Mary Jo Graves, Senior Assistant Attorney General, Ward A. Campbell, Supervising Deputy Attorney General, and Catherine Chatman and Eric L. Christoffersen, Deputy Attorneys General, by John W. Suthers, Interim Attorney General of Colorado.” Additionally, the Attorneys General of the following states filed briefs: “Roy King of Alabama, M. Jane Brady of Delaware, Steve Carter of Indiana."

== Opinion of the Court ==
=== Majority opinion ===
In a 7–2 decision, the Supreme Court reversed the decision of the Missouri Supreme Court. The opinion, written by Justice Breyer, made it clear that shackling a defendant during the sentencing portion of a trial does violate the Fifth, Sixth, Eighth, and Fourteenth Amendments to the United States Constitution. The Supreme Court held that unless the shackling pertains to a specific defendant for specific state interests, the Constitution forbids the shackling of a defendant in the sentencing phase (as well as the guilt phase) of a trial.

The Supreme Court first noted that the law (historically) has prohibited the shackling of a defendant in the guilty-innocent phase of a trial. The court also noted shackling is only allowed when there is a “special need." The court explained that this concept is embedded in the law and that courts have followed this rule throughout history. The court noted that this rule was first written by William Blackstone in his 18th Century Commentaries on England. Blackstone, a politician, judge and jurist, wrote “it is laid down in our ancient books, that, though under an indictment of the highest nature, a defendant must be brought to the bar without irons, or any manner of shackles or bonds; unless there be evident danger of an escape.” Next, the court looked at more recent opinions to show that this rule relates to a defendant's right to due process. The court looked at the dictum of three cases, Illinois v. Allen, Holbrook v. Flynn and Estelle v. Williams. In Allen, the Court said that trial courts should only use shackles on defendants, during the guilty phase, as a “last resort.” In Holbrook, the court stated that shackling is “prejudicial” and should only be allowed when state interests are involved. Lastly, in Estelle, the court stated that making a defendant go to trial wearing prison attire threatened the “fairness of the fact-finding process” and should only be allowed when “essential state policy” justifies it. The Court then established that these cases give acknowledgement to standards that are embedded in the Constitution and the law which governs in the United States. The court then tried to determine if this rule also applies to the sentencing phase of a trial, not just the guilt-innocent portion.

The court established that in fact the Due Process Clause of the Fifth and Fourteenth amendments prohibits the shackling of a defendant during the sentencing phase of a trial. The court made this determination by looking at important facts or legal standards. The court noted that shackling a defendant undermines the presumption of innocence, since shackling tells jurors that the person being shackled is dangerous and needs to be restrained. Breyer also noted that shackling a defendant hurts his ability to interact with his attorneys, and prevents a defendant from taking the witness stand. The principle of court dignity also came up in the opinion of the court. The court stated, “The routine use of shackles in the presence of juries would undermine these symbolic yet concrete objectives.” By making these conclusions about shackling a defendant, the court ruled “the considerations that militate against the routine use of visible shackles during the guilt phase of a criminal trial apply with like force to penalty proceedings in capital cases.” This deals with the fact the in these cases, the jury is still deciding between life and death and that this is a decision of equal importance compared to the question of innocence and guilt. The decision of life or death in the sentencing phase is serious which requires reliable sentencing. According to Justice Breyer, the court has “stressed the ‘acute need’ for reliable decision making when the death penalty is at issue.” Breyer stated that in Deck’s case his right to reliable sentencing was infringed upon (a right derived from the Eighth Amendment).

The Court then made it clear that the opinion of the Missouri Supreme Court did not meet the Constitutional requirements for permitting the shackling of Deck. The Supreme Court said this because they determined that the jury was aware of the shackles, that the trial judge did not permit the shackling of Deck because he was a security risk but because he had been previously convicted, and that the shackling created “prejudice” towards the defendant. All of these factors were not recognized by the Missouri Supreme Court on Deck's initial appeal. The Court concluded by saying there is one exception to shackling a defendant. The opinion of the Court permits a judge to use discretion to shackle a defendant under certain circumstances, including protecting people in the courtroom. Breyer also wrote that the determination of whether a defendant should be shackled “must be case specific.” Breyer said that if that is not the case, the shackling violates due process as it did in Deck's case.

=== Dissent ===
In the dissent, delivered by Justice Clarence Thomas and joined by Justice Scalia, it was stated that shackling Deck was not excessive as he had already been convicted, and since the jury knew of Deck's conviction, his shackling would not have shocked the members of the jury. With regard to the shackles biasing the jury, Thomas stated, “shackles may undermine the factfinding process only if seeing a convicted murderer in them is prejudicial.” Thomas writes, "[t]o presume that such a defendant suffers prejudice by appearing in handcuffs at sentencing does not comport with reality." He pointed out that the majority had put forth no evidence to support the claim that the shackles prevented Deck from participating in his defense, including taking the stand, or "that the shackles caused him pain." The dissent stated that, since Deck was convicted of capital crimes, his behavior may not have been predictable. The dissenting justices believed "he could turn that ire on his own counsel, who has failed in defending his innocence." The dissenting justices also suggested there was a possibility that Deck could have tried to harm a witness or a reporter.

Thomas argued that the opinion of the majority went against common sense and that the decision paid little attention to courtroom security issues. Later in his opinion, Thomas stated "there was no consensus that supports elevating the rule against shackling to a federal constitutional command." He argued "there is no tradition barring the use of shackles or other restraints at sentencing." He referenced then-recent court rulings which had articulated that the "rule against visible shackled does not apply to sentencing. See, e.g., State v. Young, 853 P.2d 327, 350 (Utah 1993); Duckett v. State, 104 Nev. 6, 11, 752 P.2d 752, 755 (1988) (per curiam); State v. Franklin, 97 Ohio St. 3d 1, 18—19, 776 N. E. 2d 26, 46—47 (2002)" He discussed the three decisions which the majority had cited in their opinion. Thomas stated, "in recent years, more of a consensus regarding the use of shackling has developed, with many courts concluding that shackling is inherently prejudicial. But rather than being firmly grounded in deeply rooted principles, that consensus stems from a series of ill-considered dicta…the current consensus that the court describes is one of its own making. It depends almost exclusively on the dicta in the Courts' opinions in Holbrook, Estelle and Allen." In Deck's case, Thomas posited that due process does not "place limits" on shackling because there is a difference between an accused man and a convicted man.

Thomas then wrote about the notion of courtroom dignity for the convict (Deck), claiming "the power of the courts to maintain order, however, is not a right personal to the defendant, much less one of constitutional proportions…The concern for courtroom decorum is not a concern about defendants, let alone their right to due process. It is a concern about society's need for courts to operate effectively." Thomas concludes by writing that the prevailing majority opinion in this case does not benefit the defendant but "risks the lives of courtroom personnel …a risk that due process does not require."

== Execution ==
Deck was sentenced to death for a third time on November 7, 2008. On April 13, 2017, the United States District Court for the Eastern District of Missouri granted his petition for a writ of habeas corpus and vacated his death sentence, resentencing him to life in prison without the possibility of parole. On October 19, 2020, the death sentence was reinstated following an appeal to the United States Court of Appeals for the Eighth Circuit.

On January 31, 2022, the Supreme Court of Missouri set Deck's execution date for that May 3. On May 2, the Supreme Court of the United States denied a petition to have his case stayed and Governor Mike Parson said he would allow the execution to proceed. Deck was executed by lethal injection early the next evening at the Eastern Reception, Diagnostic and Correctional Center.

== See also ==
- List of people executed in Missouri
- List of people executed in the United States in 2022

Executions carried out in Missouri
Preceded by Ernest Lee Johnson October 5, 2021	Carman Deck; May 3, 2022	Succeeded by Kevin Johnson Jr. November 29, 2022
Executions carried out in the United States
Preceded by Carl Wayne Buntion – Texas April 21, 2022	Carman Deck – Missouri; May 3, 2022	Succeeded by Clarence Dixon – Arizona May 11, 2022
