= False Arrest (film) =

1991 television film

- Genre: Drama
- Based on: False Arrest: The Joyce Lukezic Story
- Written by: Joyce Lukezic; Ted Schwarz; Andrew Laskos
- Directed by: Bill L. Norton
- Starring: Donna Mills; Steven Bauer; Lane Smith; Robert Wagner
- Music by: Sylvester Levay
- Country of origin: United States
- Original language: English

Production
- Executive producers: Joel Fields; Ronald H. Gilbert; Leonard Hill
- Cinematography: Robert Draper
- Editor: Mark W. Rosenbaum
- Running time: 192 minutes
- Production companies: Joel Fields Productions; Leonard Hill Films; Ron Gilbert Associates

Original release
- Network: ABC
- Release: November 3 – November 6, 1991

False Arrest is a 1991 American television film based on the real-life murders of William Redmond and Helen Phelps and the true story of Joyce Lukezic, who was wrongfully convicted of being one of the masterminds behind the murders. Directed by Bill L. Norton and starring Donna Mills and Steven Bauer, the film was broadcast in two parts on November 3 and 6, 1991.

== Synopsis ==
On New Year's Eve 1980, in Phoenix, Arizona, William "Pat" Redmond, his wife, Marilyn, and her mother; Helen Phelps, are hustled into a bedroom in their house by three men with guns and are each shot in the back of the head. Both Pat and Phelps die while Marilyn survives. Joyce Lukezic, the wife of Pat Redmond's business partner, Ron Lukezic, is charged with masterminding the murders.

After going to jail, Joyce suffers a heart attack, is abandoned by her lawyer and husband, and is attacked in prison. She also attempts suicide. When Joyce gets a new lawyer, she tells him she suspects her husband is the true mastermind behind the murders. She eventually gets a retrial and is found innocent.

== Cast ==
- Donna Mills as Joyce Lukezic
- Steven Bauer as Detective Dan Ryan
- Lane Smith as Martin Busey
- James Handy as Thomas Thinnes
- Lewis Van Bergen as Arnie Merrill
- Dennis Christopher as Wally Roberts
- Paul Gleason as Arthur Ross
- Penny Fuller as Marilyn Redmond
- Kiersten Warren as Eden
- Jason London as Eric
- Brian Bonsall as Jason Lukezic
- Robert Wagner as Ron Lukezic
- Robert Sampson as Pat Redmond
- Harriet White Medin as Helen Phelps
