= Clarence Dixon =

American murderer (1955–2022)

- Undated mug shot of Dixon
- Born: August 26, 1955; Fort Defiance, Arizona U.S.
- Died: May 11, 2022 (aged 66); Florence State Prison, Arizona, U.S.
- Status: Executed by lethal injection
- Convictions: First degree murder Kidnapping; Sexual assault (4 counts); Sexual abuse Aggravated assault (2 counts); First degree burglary
- Penalty: Life imprisonment (January 8, 1986); Death (January 24, 2008)

Details
- Victims: Deana Lynne Bowdoin, 21
- Date: January 7, 1978
- Country: United States
- State: Arizona
- Date apprehended: 2001 (for murder)

Clarence Wayne Dixon (August 26, 1955 – May 11, 2022) was an American convicted murderer. He was convicted of the January 7, 1978, murder of 21-year-old Deana Lynne Bowdoin in Tempe, Arizona. The murder went unsolved until 2001, when DNA profiling linked him to the crime. Dixon, who was serving a life sentence for a 1986 sexual assault conviction, was found guilty of Bowdoin's murder and was formally sentenced to death on January 24, 2008. He was executed by lethal injection on May 11, 2022, in the state's first execution in nearly eight years, since the botched execution of Joseph Wood in 2014.

== Early life ==
Dixon was born on August 26, 1955, in Fort Defiance, Arizona. In 1974, he graduated from Chinle High School. In 1977, he went to Arizona State University to study engineering. The same year, he was arrested for assault with a deadly weapon when he attacked a 15-year-old girl, whom Dixon would later claim reminded him of his ex-wife. Dixon hit the girl over the head with a metal pipe. Two psychiatrists who examined Dixon concluded that he was not competent to stand trial and he was found not guilty by reason of insanity by future U.S. Supreme Court Justice Sandra Day O'Connor.

== Murder ==
On January 6, 1978, 21-year-old Deana Lynne Bowdoin, an Arizona State University senior, met her parents for dinner and then went to meet a friend at a nearby bar. The two stayed at the bar until midnight and then Bowdoin told her friend she was going home. Bowdoin returned to her apartment in Tempe in the early hours of January 7. At around 2:00 a.m. Bowdoin's boyfriend returned to the apartment and found her dead body lying on the bed. Bowdoin had been strangled to death with a belt and had also been stabbed multiple times. Semen was found on her vagina and underwear, but it could not be positively matched to any suspect.

Bowdoin's murder went unsolved for over twenty years and became a cold case. In 2001, a cold case detective checked the DNA profile against a national database. He learned that the profile matched Clarence Dixon, a man who was serving a life sentence in an Arizona state prison for a 1986 sexual-assault conviction. It was learned that Dixon had lived across the street from Bowdoin at the time of her murder. None of Bowdoin's family or friends knew of any connection between her and Dixon, however.

== Trial and appeals ==
Dixon was charged with the rape and murder of Bowdoin. However, the rape charge was later dropped due to a statute of limitations. On January 24, 2008, Dixon was found guilty of first degree murder and was sentenced to death.

Dixon's lawyers argued that he was mentally incompetent, had been diagnosed with paranoid schizophrenia, and had experienced frequent hallucinations throughout his life. In 2015, he was declared legally blind. Dixon had previously been found not guilty by reason of insanity in a 1977 assault case. The murder of Bowdoin had occurred only two days after the verdict.

== Death warrant and final appeals ==
Following the botched execution of Joseph Wood via lethal injection in 2014, the state of Arizona stopped all executions. Lawsuits that were filed required the state to use a new lethal injection cocktail. Following a lengthy process, the state looked to find a new and approved drug for executions.

In 2020, the Arizona Department of Corrections purchased one thousand vials of the drug pentobarbital, costing one and a half million dollars. In 2021, the state also announced it had refurbished its gas chamber, allowing inmates the option of being executed by lethal gas. In April 2021, the state announced it was ready to begin executions again. The first two inmates scheduled for execution were Dixon and fellow death row inmate Frank Jarvis Atwood. Atwood was scheduled for execution on September 28, 2021, while Dixon was scheduled for execution on October 19, 2021. However, the state later acknowledged that the lethal injection drugs they would be using in the executions would expire after forty-five days, having claimed previously that it expired after ninety days. Following the discovery, Arizona Attorney General Mark Brnovich asked the Arizona Supreme Court to shorten the briefing schedules for both executions. On July 12, 2021, the Arizona Supreme Court denied the request to speed up the executions, and they were both halted.

== Execution ==
In January 2022, Brnovich asked the Arizona Supreme Court to set briefing schedules for the executions of Atwood and Dixon once again. Brnovich announced that additional testing had been conducted on the lethal injection drugs, and they would have a beyond-use date of at least ninety days. On April 5, 2022, the Arizona Supreme Court issued an execution warrant for Dixon, scheduling him for execution on May 11, 2022. Dixon was given the choice to be executed by lethal injection or lethal gas. On April 20, after declining to pick a method, the state announced that Dixon would be executed by lethal injection, the default method for an inmate who does not make a decision. On April 28, the Arizona Board of Executive Clemency denied Dixon's request for a commutation or a reprieve.

Dixon was executed by lethal injection on May 11, 2022, the first person to be put to death in Arizona since 2014. The injection began at 10:19 a.m. He was pronounced dead 11 minutes later at 10:30 a.m. Dixon maintained his innocence in his final statement. Prior to his execution, Dixon ate a last meal of Kentucky Fried Chicken, strawberry ice cream, and a bottle of water.

== See also ==
- Capital punishment in Arizona
- Capital punishment in the United States
- List of people executed in Arizona
- List of people executed in the United States in 2022

Executions carried out in Arizona
Preceded by Joseph Rudolph Wood III July 23, 2014	Clarence Dixon; May 11, 2022	Succeeded by Frank Jarvis Atwood June 8, 2022
Executions carried out in the United States
Preceded by Carman Deck – Missouri May 3, 2022	Clarence Dixon – Arizona; May 11, 2022	Succeeded by Frank Jarvis Atwood – Arizona June 8, 2022
