= Matthew Reeves =

American convicted murderer (1977–2022)

- Mugshot of Reeves
- Born: December 13, 1977; Selma, Alabama, U.S.
- Died: January 27, 2022 (aged 44); Holman Correctional Facility, Alabama, U.S.
- Cause of death: Execution by lethal injection
- Conviction: Capital murder
- Penalty: Death (1998)

Details
- Victims: Willie Johnson Jr.
- Date: November 27, 1996
- State: Alabama
- Imprisoned at: Holman Correctional Facility

Matthew Reeves (December 13, 1977 – January 27, 2022) was an American convicted of murder. He was executed by the state of Alabama for the 1996 murder of Willie Johnson Jr. Reeves's case generated attention due to claims he was intellectually disabled.

== Personal life ==
Reeves was born on December 13, 1977. He had intellectual disabilities, with an IQ in the 60s.

== Crime ==
On Wednesday, November 27, 1996, Reeves and his friends planned to rob a drug dealer. Reeves' car broke down in Selma, Alabama, and Willie Johnson Jr., who had a pickup truck, offered to tow their car to Reeves' house. Reeves rode in the bed of the truck. When they arrived at the house, Reeves stuck a shotgun through the cab window and shot Johnson and stole his money. At a party that evening, Reeves "pretended to pump a shotgun and jerk his body around mocking the way Johnson had died." Johnson's body was found inside his truck the following day, Thanksgiving morning.

Reeves was arrested at a house a few hours after the murder. Two accomplices also involved in the crime, one of whom was his brother, were arrested a few days later. Both accomplices pointed the finger at Reeves and claimed he had been the shooter.

== Legal proceedings ==
Reeves was sentenced to death on July 20, 1998. Reeves' brother and co-defendant, Julius Reeves, was sentenced to life without the possibility of parole. A third defendant, Brenda Suttles, was sentenced to life in prison with the possibility of parole.

Reeves' lawyers argued that his trial lawyers provided ineffective assistance of counsel and "should have done more to try to show he is intellectually disabled." They claimed that because of this Reeves should not face the death sentence. On July 2, 2021, the United States Supreme Court overturned the Eleventh U.S. Circuit Court of Appeals decision that had vacated Reeves' death sentence. The court decided in a 6–3 opinion, with the conservative majority reversing the circuit court. The Supreme Court stated that the Alabama state court had "correctly rejected claims that Matthew Reeves had ineffective counsel at trial because they did not hire a neuropsychologist to present evidence he is intellectually disabled."

On November 18, 2021, the Alabama Supreme Court voted 8–0 to schedule Reeves' execution for January 27, 2022. Reeves was scheduled to be executed on that date by lethal injection.

On January 7, 2022, his execution was stayed on the grounds of a lawsuit. He sued the state, saying that the state did not accommodate his disability when it gave him a form asking him to choose whether he wanted to die by hypoxia or another method. The state appealed the stay of execution. On January 26, 2022, a federal appeals court upheld the lower court ruling that the execution of Reeves could not proceed. Following the ruling, the state attorney general's office announced it would appeal the decision to the Supreme Court of the United States. The appeal was successful and the Supreme Court voted 5–4 that the execution could proceed.

== Execution ==
Reeves was executed by lethal injection on January 27, 2022, at the age of 44. He was pronounced dead at 9:24 p.m. and had no last words or meal. Some of Johnson's family members attended the execution and released a statement that said, "After 26 years justice [has] finally been served. Our family can now have some closure." Prior to the execution, the European Union ambassador to the United States, Stavros Lambrinidis, sent a letter to Governor Kay Ivey asking her to block the execution. The letter also condemned the murder of Johnson.

== See also ==
- List of people executed in Alabama
- List of people executed in the United States in 2022

Executions carried out in Alabama
Preceded by Willie B. Smith III October 21, 2021	Matthew Reeves; January 27, 2022	Succeeded by Joe Nathan James Jr. July 28, 2022
Executions carried out in the United States
Preceded by Donald Anthony Grant – Oklahoma January 27, 2022	Matthew Reeves – Alabama; January 27, 2022	Succeeded by Gilbert Postelle – Oklahoma February 17, 2022
