= Billie Jean Floyd =

American politician (1929–2025)

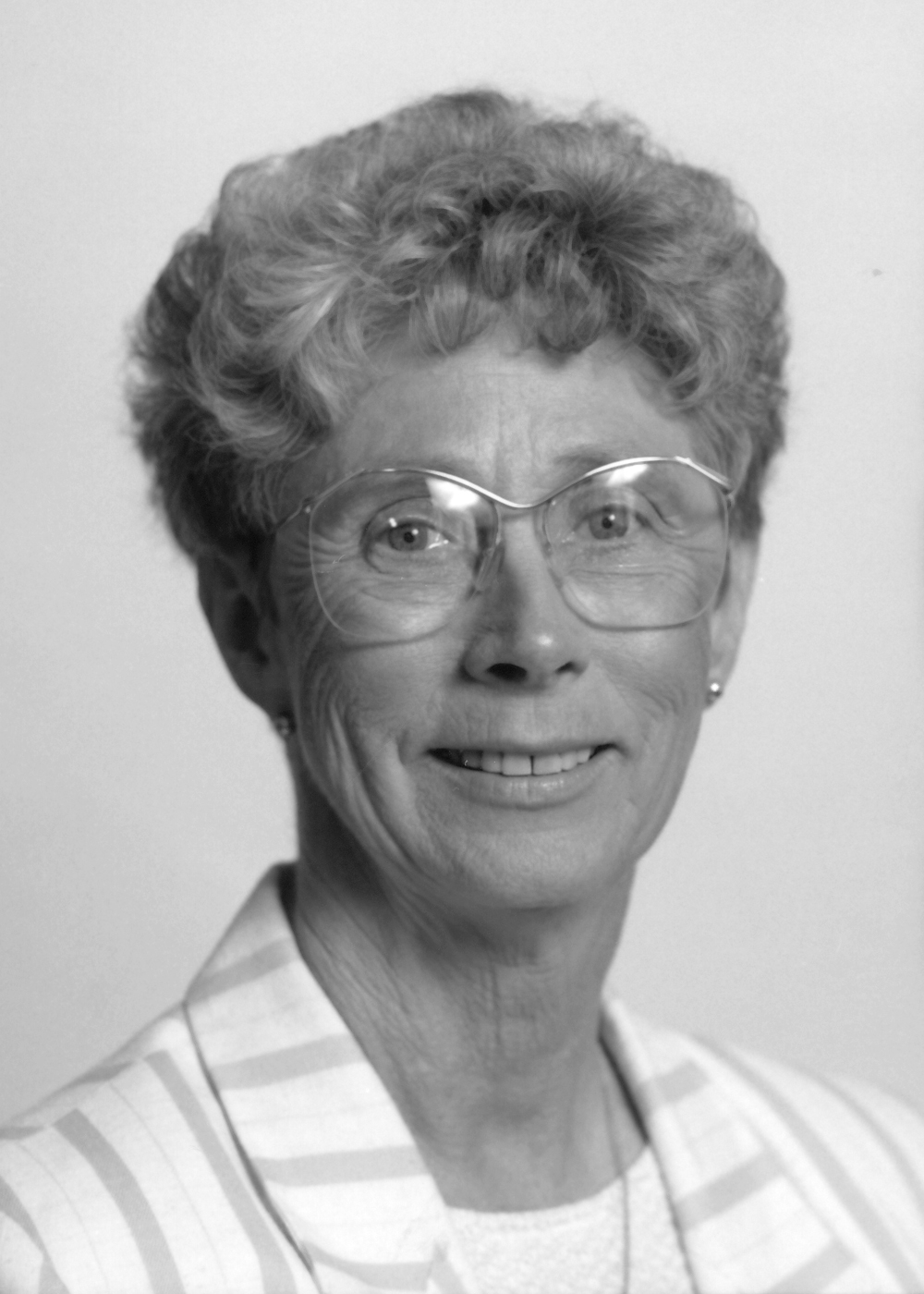

Member of the Oklahoma Senate from the 13th district
- In office 1984–1988
- Preceded by: James McDaniel
- Succeeded by: Dick Wilkerson

Personal details
- Born: Billie Jean Fathree; December 24, 1929 Ada, Oklahoma, U.S.
- Died: March 11, 2025 (aged 95) Ada, Oklahoma, U.S.
- Party: Democratic
- Spouse: Ben Floyd
- Education: East Central University, University of Oklahoma
- Profession: educator

Billie Jean Floyd (December 24, 1929 – March 11, 2025) was an American politician, educator and civic leader who was an Oklahoma state senator. Floyd served in the Oklahoma Senate from 1984 to 1988, representing district 13. After her time in office, Floyd has remained active in historical preservation and several other community service projects. After her term, she served both as P.T. Supervisor for first year teachers at her alma mater, East Central University and P.T. Field Representative for the US Census Bureau.

== Early life ==
Billie Jean Floyd was born on Christmas Eve in 1929 at the very beginning of the Great Depression in Ada, Oklahoma. Floyd's family did not experience the Depression as many others did, in that her father was employed with Railway Express Agency. Floyd graduated from Ada High School in 1947. After graduation from high school, she attended East Central University.

=== Education and career ===
Floyd graduated with her bachelor's degree in education in 1951. Immediately after, she pursued graduate school at the Texas Women's University. She stayed there for a short time and then returned to her home state where she taught her first year in Duncan, Oklahoma. After that first year, Floyd signed a contract with East Central University and began to teach at the college. In 1952, Floyd married her high school sweetheart, Ben Floyd, and the couple had two children. She earned her Master's in Education from OU in 1955.

After a long career in education, Floyd decided to run for the state senate in district 13.

== Oklahoma Senate (1984–1988) ==
Floyd was actively involved with politics before she decided to run for office. During her childhood, religion and politics were daily discussions at the dinner table and her family members openly supported political campaigns. Floyd teamed up with Lou and Wes Watkins to petition for the Equal Rights Amendment before she decided to campaign for office. They were told that if they received enough signatures, senator Roy Boatner would change his vote from a "no" to a "yes." Floyd and her companions did not succeed in completing the petition. Soon after, Floyd ran for office and was elected in 1984. She learned that their earlier petition would have not changed senator Boatner's vote, and this recognition majorly influenced some of her political decisions later on in her life.

While campaigning, Floyd would hand peppermints to the public saying, "“Hello, my name is Billie Floyd and I’m running for the State Senate, and I just want to tell you that your vote would mean a mint to me, and here it is to show you."

While in office, she chaired the tourism committee. Floyd's old botany professor from East Central, Dr. Doyle McCoy, approached her in order to establish a state flower. Floyd carried the bill in the senate that inaugurated the Indian Blanket as the state flower of Oklahoma. Floyd was eventually defeated in the 1988 Democratic primary by Dick Wilkerson.

== Retirement and death ==
After leaving office, Floyd served her community in several other capacities. She worked as a first-year residency teacher supervisor for East Central University. She also conducted interviews for the U.S. Census Bureau. Aside from these two positions, Floyd busied herself with many community service projects and organizations. Floyd wrote the grant that established the Tri-County Indian Nations Community Development Corp., an Enterprise Community serving Coal, Johnston and Pontotoc counties. She is responsible for establishing the first Special Olympics Games in Oklahoma as well as both the Pontotoc Animal Welfare Society and PAST (Preserving Area Stories in Time). Floyd was also a member of the Retired Educators Association, New Horizons, and PAWS. In 2009, Floyd was inducted into the ECU Gene and Evelyn Keefer Educators Hall of Fame.

Floyd died at her home in Ada, on March 11, 2025, at the age of 95.
