= C. L. Harkins =

American child rapist and suspected murderer

- Born: Columbus Lee Harkins; 1864; Georgia, U.S.
- Died: July 30, 1920 (aged 55–56); Oklahoma State Penitentiary, Oklahoma, U.S.
- Resting place: Coffeyville, Kansas
- Occupation: Veterinarian
- Status: Deceased
- Conviction: First degree rape
- Penalty: 50 years imprisonment

Columbus Lee Harkins (1864 – July 30, 1920) was an American veterinary surgeon, serial child rapist, and suspected mass murderer.

== Early life ==
Columbus Lee Harkins, commonly known by his initials or "Lum", was born in Georgia in 1864, as the youngest child of Ashberry and Nancy Harkins (née Terry). His parents moved to Missouri, then Kansas, first in Parker Township in 1885, then Coffeyville the following year.

Harkins earned a degree in veterinary medicine before moving to the town of Delaware in Nowata County, Indian Territory, in modern-day Oklahoma, around 1900. He practiced veterinary medicine, farmed, owned a boarding house, and owned and operated a merry go-round and other amusements at local carnivals and country picnics. He was quite wealthy for the times, reportedly having a net worth of between $10,000.00 (equivalent to $387,000 in 2025) and $20,000.00 (equivalent to $774,000 in 2025).

== Criminal history ==
On February 12, 1887, Harkins was accused of theft from the landlord of a hotel in Arkansas City while working there as a desk clerk the previous winter. He was acquitted on April 14, in part owing to his "well know, highly respected" status and "good standing" as supported by his parents and friends, and the court dismissing one of the witnesses for being a "colored man with an unsavory record". Harkins also spread the rumor that his accuser, A. E. Kirkpatrick, was in an incestuous relationship with his daughter. The judge instead ordered Kirkpatrick and his witnesses to pay a fine of $15 (equivalent to $537 in 2025).

According to his rape trial in 1915, Harkins was convicted during the 1890's for the rape of Mary Golda Rockwood in Kansas, when she was under the age of 10.

In December 1888, Rebecca Detre of Parker Township accused Harkins of bastardy. He was convicted of the charges and ordered to pay $100 (equivalent to $3,583 in 2025) a year until the boy was 15. The South Kansas Tribune excoriated him in an opinion piece that said it was "one of the filthiest cases of its class in years" and "exhibited the baseness and depravity of some young men," and how they "resort to base charges and insinuations against girls who would not associate with them" and finally suggested that parents horsewhip young men like him.

In 1901, Harkins was found guilty of assault in an argument with another man over the hitching of a horse to a small tree.

In 1905, he found himself in federal court on charges of assault with intent to kill in a dispute with a man named Robert Hall. Harkins was driving a herd of cattle to Nowata, Oklahoma, when he encountered Hall and his 20-year old son. A dispute arose about a calf. Hall said Harkins came at him with a knife, but he was able to fight him off with his horse whip. Harkins managed to get these charges dismissed.

=== 1912 murder charges ===
In 1909, Harkins began grooming and sexually abusing 12-year old Elsie Adams, who had moved into his boarding house with her family.

On February 3, 1912, fifteen-year old Adams was killed alongside her neighbors Arvie and Safrania "Fronie" Hurst in a triple murder at the Hurst residence. Evidence indicated all three victims had been dosed with morphine and/or potassium cyanide and their bodies doused with coal oil before their house burned down around 10:30 p.m. Harkins was charged with murder and arson after an autopsy revealed that Adams was pregnant with Harkins's child. Harkins had bought a bag of candy for Elsie after church that evening, and left her at the house around 9:30 p.m. Prosecutors emphasized that Harkins was the last person to see Elsie Adams alive; and had both medical knowledge of poisons and a "lascivious disposition" toward young girls. Harkins testified at his preliminary examination and admitted his relationship with the fifteen-year-old girl. The defense attempted to show that the victims had been overcome by gas leaking from a faulty pipe, and died in a fireball explosion.

The ostensible motive for the murders was Harkins's anger at interference by Fronie Hurst, Elsie's brother Will "Bill" Adams, and perhaps others, in his plans to marry Elsie Adams. She had told friends that she didn't care for Harkins, but stayed with him because she feared him and he had threatened her. The Oklahoman reported that Harkins escaped lynching on the night of the murders only because his attempted assailants "couldn't get the other boys" to leave a meeting of the Democratic Club and join the mob. Harkins denied the killings, but also testified at his preliminary hearing that if Bill Adams hadn't "caused trouble" for him, "the girl would still be alive today". The jury in Harkins's first murder trial failed to reach a verdict.

The 48 year-old Harkins then shocked the community by marrying Mary Golda Rockwood, then aged 22, after posting $12,500.00 bail to secure his appearance at the second trial. The second jury also failed to reach a verdict, and Harkins was never convicted.

=== Rape of Inez Greenleaf ===
In the fall of 1915, then 50 year-old Harkins was charged with raping Inez Greenleaf, aged 11-12. Like Elsie Adams, Inez Greenleaf met Harkins when she and her ailing and destitute mother were taken into Harkins's boarding house as charity three years earlier. She recently had been visiting at the invitation of Harkins's wife, Mary, to help her with their two young children. Harkins had taken Inez Greenleaf along with him on a weekend trip to a Nowata County picnic to operate his merry-go-round. She said he had raped her on the banks of a small creek not far from the picnic grounds.

=== Trial ===
Charges that the disgraced doctor had again raped a young local girl inflamed the public. In mid-September, 1915, a mob gathered at the Nowata County Jail intent on lynching him. Deputies escaped with Harkins to Bartlesville, Oklahoma and held him in the jail there. He was bound over for trial and granted a change of venue to Rogers County, where he was tried in January, 1916.

In addition to testimony of Inez Greenleaf, the prosecution attempted, unsuccessfully, to show that Harkins had been convicted two decades earlier of raping a young girl in Kansas; charged with the child rape of his much younger wife, Mary Rockwood; and had illicit intercourse with the late Elsie Adams from the age of 12 or 13. Harkins denied any wrongdoing in his trial testimony. The jury in the Greenleaf case found him guilty but could not agree to the penalty. The trial judge sentenced Harkins to fifty years in prison, and the case was affirmed in 1918 on appeal.

== Death ==
Harkins was stabbed to death on July 30, 1920, at Oklahoma State Penitentiary by an African-American fellow inmate, Charlie Walker, over a poker debt. Walker was convicted of Harkins's murder and sentenced to death by electrocution. Concerned that Walker's trial and sentencing for Harkins's murder were influenced by racial prejudice, the Oklahoma Court of Criminal Appeals was unwilling to sanction "the extreme penalty of the law," for the killing of a prisoner "in a fight over a gambling game," and modified Walker's death sentence to life imprisonment. Citing previous published cases, the Court remarked that the murdered prisoner Harkins was himself "a vicious and desperate criminal." Harkins is buried in an unmarked family grave in Coffeyville, Kansas.
