= Murders of William Redmond and Helen Phelps =

1980 double murder in Phoenix, Arizona

- Victim William "Pat" Redmond
- Location: Phoenix, Arizona, U.S.
- Date: December 31, 1980; 45 years ago
- Attack type: Murder by shooting
- Weapon: Gun
- Victims: William "Pat" Redmond, 46; Helen Phelps, 70
- Perpetrators: Edward Lonzo McCall Jr. Murray Hooper; William Bracy
- Verdict: Guilty
- Convictions: First-degree murder
- Sentence: Death

On December 31, 1980, William Patrick "Pat" Redmond and his mother-in-law Helen Genevieve Phelps were murdered at Redmond's home in Phoenix, Arizona. Three men knocked on the door of Redmond's home holding a gun and ordered Redmond, Phelps, and Redmond's wife, Marilyn, to a bedroom, where they were forced to lie down as their hands were bound. William was then fatally shot in the back of the head along with Phelps. Marilyn was also shot in the back of the head, but survived.

Phoenix police initially believed the murders were the result of a home invasion and suggested robbery was the motive, as some jewelry and cash were taken. However, when Edward Lonzo McCall Jr., a former police officer, was arrested in connection with the murders, reports suggested the murders were the result of a murder-for-hire scheme and that the murders were contract killings. Marilyn identified the three killers as McCall, William Bracy, and Murray Hooper. Prosecutors accused Robert Charles Cruz, a Tempe businessman, as being the mastermind of the plot, whom they said was planning to take over a printing business owned by William Redmond and his business partner Ron Lukezic. Lukezic's wife, Joyce, was also accused of being involved in the conspiracy.

Cruz was convicted and sentenced to death for allegedly ordering the murders but was later acquitted during his fifth trial. Joyce Lukezic was also convicted for her alleged role in the murders but was later acquitted during her third trial. Both Joyce and Cruz's lawyers blamed Ron Lukezic for being the mastermind of the murders, as he became the sole owner of the printing business after William's death, however, he was never charged in the case. McCall, Bracy, and Hooper were all sentenced to death for their roles in the murders.

Cruz was murdered two years after his acquittal and McCall and Bracy both died on death row before their executions could be carried out. Hooper was executed in 2022 via lethal injection. Joyce Lukezic went on to co-author a book about her wrongful conviction. In 1991, a television film called False Arrest was released, which is based on the Redmond murder case and Joyce's wrongful conviction. The murders have been described as a case tainted by allegations of police misconduct.

== Victims ==
William Patrick Redmond, who was known as "Pat" to friends, was born in Huntington, West Virginia. He was married to Marilyn Redmond and the couple had three children. He also had two stepchildren, five grandchildren, two brothers, and three sisters. He was a member of the St. Catherine's Catholic Church in Columbus, Ohio, a member of the Benevolent and Protective Order of Elks, and a contributing member of St. Mary's Food Bank Alliance. Before moving to Phoenix in the 1950s, William lived in Ohio. His friend and business partner Ron Lukezic, who had known him for twenty years, said he "had no enemies; was too well-liked, and was just a nice guy." According to Lukezic, William liked to boat, fish, and drink beer and was "a big fan of ASU." Lukezic did however admit that William had a bad habit of showing off gold coins in bars. Lukezic met William when they worked together in various printing businesses in Phoenix. In 1975, the pair opened their own printing business, Graphic Dimensions. While friends of the Redmond's portrayed them as sociable, neighbors said they were recluses and kept to themselves. The couple had lived in their Phoenix home about a year prior to William's murder.

== Murders ==
On December 31, 1980, William and Marilyn Redmond were preparing for a New Year's Eve party at their home. Marilyn's mother, Helen Phelps, was staying with them and helped prepare food for the guests. At around 8:00 p.m. a knock came at the door. Marilyn assumed it was guests arriving early for the party and William answered. Moments later, William called out "Marilyn, come here." When Marilyn got to the door, she saw three men standing there with a gun pointed at William. The men, two of whom were Black and one White, then forced their way into the home. None of them were wearing masks. The men ordered William, Marilyn, and Phelps to head into a back bedroom. One of the intruders then asked Marilyn where the couple kept their guns and she showed the intruders a closet where they kept two shotguns and a rifle. Marilyn was then walked into a bedroom where she saw Phelps lying face down on the bed with her hands tied behind her back.

The intruders then asked where the couple kept their money. William said there was $1,200 in a billfold in his back pocket and Marilyn said she had two $100 bills folded up in the billfold of her purse. Marilyn was then ordered to lie down next to Phelps while one of the intruders began going through her purse. William was also told to lie face down next to Marilyn. The intruders then bound the couple's hands with tape. William, Marilyn, and Phelps were then gagged with woolen socks that were taken from a dresser drawer. As all three of them lay down on the bed, Marilyn heard one of the intruders say, "We don't need them anymore." Two shots were then fired; the first bullet went into William's head and the second bullet into Phelps's head. Marilyn did not hear the third shot, but the third bullet went into the back of her own head and exited through her jaw. Both William and Phelps died while Marilyn survived. The intruders also cut William's throat with a knife.

== Aftermath ==
Marilyn eventually came around and rolled off the bed onto the floor. She was covered in blood and could barely lift her neck. She then crawled to the family room with her hands still bound behind her back. A while later, she was discovered by friends who had arrived for the New Year's Eve party. The friends called the police and Marilyn was rushed to Good Samaritan Hospital where she was treated for her injuries and the gunshot wound. The bullet had exited through her cheek and fractured her jaw. Police found the bodies of William Redmond and Helen Phelps in the master bedroom.

The following day, Marilyn Redmond was still listed as being in a serious condition and detectives were unable to interview her. She had however been able to tell police that three men had entered the home around 8:00 p.m. on New Year's Eve carrying guns. Marilyn was eventually released from hospital on January 13, 1981.

In the days after the killings, people began driving through the neighborhood looking for the Redmond's home. Members of the Ku Klux Klan also headed through the neighborhood handing out leaflets and leaving them on cars. The leaflets claimed the attack on the Redmond's was an act of Black aggression against the White race. Residents in the neighborhood reacted with disbelief.

== Investigation ==
On January 4, 1981, police arrested Edward Lonzo McCall Jr., a former police officer with the Phoenix Police Department. McCall was originally picked up in connection with a robbery that occurred in Scottsdale in October 1980. Police learned that certain methods used in the robbery in Scottsdale were similar to the methods used in the robbery at the Redmond's home.

On January 14, a preliminary hearing was held for McCall. Valenda Lee Harper, a Phoenix prostitute, testified that William Redmond and Helen Phelps were the victims of a contract killing and that she knew who the killers were. Harper claimed the killings occurred because someone was losing a lot of money. She also said that McCall, who was White, and two Black men from Chicago, had told her details of the plot at her former apartment. Marilyn Redmond also attended the hearing as a witness and identified McCall as one of the intruders who had entered her home that night.

As police continued their investigation, they determined the two other intruders who had accompanied McCall were William Bracy and Murray Hooper, both of Chicago. On February 21, 1981, Bracy was arrested by Chicago police. The following day, Hooper was also picked up for questioning. The pair were also wanted in connection with the November 1980 murders of three Chicago drug dealers. On February 22, Marilyn identified Bracy and Hooper during a police lineup in Cook County, Illinois, as the two other intruders who had killed her husband and mother on New Year's Eve 1980.

Detectives also attempted to track down another conspirator involved in the case who was acquainted with McCall called Arnold Merrill. On April 24, 1981, Merrill surrendered to the police in Long Island, New York. He agreed to cooperate with detectives in their investigation. According to Merrill, the person who orchestrated the murders was Robert Charles Cruz, a crime boss and former Tempe businessman who wanted to take over William Redmond's business. On May 15, 1981, Cruz was arrested in St. Charles, Illinois, on suspicion of being the mastermind behind the murders of William Redmond and Helen Phelps.

On August 27, 1981, Joyce Lukezic, the wife of William Redmond's business partner Ron Lukezic, was indicted by a county grand jury in connection with the murders. The indictment was based primarily on information supplied to detectives by Merrill; who claimed that Joyce plotted with Cruz to have William Redmond killed. Joyce's brother, Artie Ross, was a business associate of Cruz in a Scottsdale real-estate development firm. On August 28, Joyce was arrested at her home in Phoenix. Bracy and Hooper were also indicted.

== First trials ==
On September 4, 1981, Merrill was sentenced to eight years in prison after pleading guilty to charges of burglary and theft. His conviction was part of a plea bargain in which he would receive immunity for his involvement in the Redmond case in exchange for his cooperation.

On December 10, 1981, Cruz and McCall were found guilty. On January 11, 1982, both were sentenced to death.

Before they faced trial for their roles in the murders of William Redmond and Helen Phelps, both Bracy and Hooper faced trial in Illinois for the murders of the three Chicago drug dealers in November 1980. On September 9, 1981, Bracy was sentenced to death in Illinois for his role in that crime. On September 23, Hooper was also sentenced to death for participating in those murders. The victims in the Illinois case were Frederick Lacey, R.C. Pettigrew and Richard Holliman. On February 24, 1982, Bracy and Hooper were extradited from Illinois to Arizona to stand trial in the Redmond case. The trials of Bracy and Hooper began in late 1982. On December 24, 1982, both men were found guilty. On February 11, 1983, both were sentenced to death. In 2003, the death sentences in Illinois for both men were commuted to life in prison after Governor George Ryan commuted the sentences of all death row inmates.

On August 4, 1982, after a two-month trial, Joyce Lukezic was found guilty of two counts of first-degree murder, one count of attempted murder, one count of conspiracy to commit murder, one count of armed burglary, three counts of armed robbery, and three counts of kidnapping. Following the verdict, Joseph Brownlee, the deputy county attorney, announced the state would seek a death sentence for her. However, she was never formally sentenced after being found guilty.

== Retrials ==
=== Acquittal of Joyce Lukezic ===
Joyce Lukezic had been found guilty based entirely on circumstantial evidence during her first trial. Many courtroom observers agreed that the case against her had been weak. Merrill was the chief prosecution witness against her and he had once dated her when she was 16. On April 1, 1983, Judge Rudolph Gerber ordered a new trial for Lukezic because the prosecution team had failed to disclose to the jury the benefits and assistance given to Merrill and another key prosecution witness whose testimony was considered pivotal.

On April 9, 1985, jury selection began for Lukezic's second trial. Lukezic's defense attorney told the jury that the wrong Lukezic was on trial and that her husband, Ron Lukezic, who was William Redmond's business partner, should instead be sat at the defense table. Ron Lukezic gained full ownership of the printing business he shared with William Redmond after William died and Joyce Lukezic's defense argued it was Ron who was responsible for the murders. Ron Lukezic was subpoenaed in the trial but failed to show. He had since relocated to the East Coast and abandoned Joyce. Joyce's defense lawyers described how Ron had made some strange statements around the time of William's death, including one on the day of the killings in which he had said to a friend, "The blacks are going to kill us all." This statement was made before police revealed that two men wanted in the murders were Black. On the day of William Redmond's funeral, Ron had also said to a business associate, "My God, what have I done?" However, Ron Lukezic was never brought to trial and was not charged in the case. During the closing arguments of the second trial, Joyce Lukezic's attorney described Merrill as the "lowest individual who has ever been placed on the witness stand by any prosecutor." On May 10, 1985, after a three-week trial, the second trial of Joyce Lukezic ended in a mistrial when the jury deadlocked 10–2 in favor of acquitting her.

On October 1, 1985, Joyce Lukezic's third trial began. Her defense lawyer renewed claims from the previous trial that Ron Lukezic should be on trial instead of Joyce. He also attacked the credibility of the witnesses for the prosecution. On November 1, 1985, after a four-week trial, Joyce Lukezic was acquitted in the Redmond murder case and found innocent. The jury concluded that most of the prosecution witnesses had been lying.

=== Acquittal of Robert Charles Cruz ===
On October 6, 1983, the Arizona Supreme Court overturned Cruz's murder conviction and death sentence as they said he should not have been tried with McCall. A new trial for Cruz was ordered. The Arizona Supreme Court denied McCall a retrial. On July 15, 1987, after six weeks of testimony, Cruz's second trial ended in a mistrial when jurors deadlocked 8–4 in favor of conviction. On November 6, 1987, after ten weeks of testimony, Cruz's third trial once again ended in a mistrial. This time, jurors deadlocked 11–1 in favor of conviction. In 1988, Cruz was tried a fourth time. This time, he was found guilty.

On July 29, 1993, Cruz's conviction was once again overturned. The Arizona Supreme Court overturned his conviction because it was learned that in his fourth trial, Cruz had been discriminated against because the prosecution had excluded Hispanics from the jury. In 1995, Cruz was tried for a fifth time. During this trial, he spoke for the first time, having remained silent in all previous trials. He argued he had been framed by Merrill who had won immunity in exchange for his testimony. On June 1, 1995, after three days of deliberation, the jury returned its verdict and found Cruz innocent. In total, Cruz spent fourteen years on Arizona's death row before being granted freedom. Marilyn Redmond attended every one of Cruz's trials. Following his acquittal, she chose not to speak and could not be located for comment.

== Subsequent developments ==
=== Deaths of McCall and Bracy ===
McCall's death sentence and convictions were upheld and he remained on Arizona's death row. At one point, McCall was ordered to be resentenced in the case, as he had received improper advice from his lawyer not to cooperate in the preparation of his 1982 pre-sentence report. However, on January 30, 1986, he was resentenced to death. On February 18, 2000, McCall died in prison at the age of 58. Bracy's death sentence and convictions were also upheld. On April 9, 2005, Bracy died in prison of cancer at the age of 63.

=== Murder of Cruz ===
Following his acquittal, Cruz returned to his hometown of Chicago to spend time with his four sons. In 1997, two years after his release from prison, a cousin of his by marriage, who was a reputed mob hitman, was to stand trial on a murder charge. Cruz convinced him to hire his former attorney. Ultimately, the hitman was convicted and sentenced to over 100 years in prison. In December 1997, days after the hitman was sentenced, Cruz went missing. In March 2007, human remains were found wrapped in a blue tarp in Downers Grove, Illinois. The remains were confirmed as Cruz's and he was identified through fingerprints and tattoos. Law enforcement sources reported that Cruz had been shot. His death was investigated as a murder.

=== Joyce Lukezic and False Arrest ===
After being acquitted, Joyce Lukezic went on to write a book about the Redmond case, her experiences, and her wrongful conviction. In 1990, her book was published, and was called, False Arrest: The Joyce Lukezic Story. Lukezic co-wrote the book with the author Ted Schwarz. In 1991, a television film was released which was based on Joyce Lukezic's story. The film, called False Arrest, aired in two parts on November 3 and November 6, 1991. Joyce Lukezic was played by American actress Donna Mills and Ron Lukezic was played by American actor Robert Wagner.

=== Execution of Murray Hooper ===
In 2013, the Illinois murder convictions for Hooper were vacated.

On October 12, 2022, the Arizona Supreme Court granted the state's request for a warrant of execution for Murray Hooper. He was scheduled to be executed on November 16, 2022. As he declined to pick a method of execution, he was set to be executed by lethal injection; the state's default execution method.

On November 16, 2022, Murray Hooper was executed via lethal injection for his role in the murders of William Redmond and Helen Phelps. He was 76 years old at the time of his death. Hooper's attorneys argued that he was convicted and sentenced on unreliable witness testimony. No physical evidence linked him to the crime. They also argued that Marilyn Redmond's description of the home intruders changed several times before she identified Hooper as one of the killers. According to The Arizona Republic, the execution team struggled to insert into Hooper the intravenous needles that deliver lethal drugs during an execution. At one point, Hooper turned to the viewing gallery and said, "Can you believe this?" He later said, "What's taking so long?" as execution team members failed to find the anesthetic and called for another medical kit. The execution team resorted to inserting an IV line into Hooper's femoral vein, which caused him to experience pain, and resulted in a "fair amount of blood." Once the lines were inserted, the execution team administered the pentobarbital. Hooper was pronounced dead at 10:34 a.m. According to witnesses, it took around 10 to 12 minutes for him to die.

No one from the families of William Redmond and Helen Phelps chose to attend Hooper's execution, nor did any of Hooper's family members. One of William Redmond's sons, Mike Redmond, said that the loss of his father was still felt deeply but the family did not want to be part of Hooper's execution. When asked about Hooper's execution, Mike Redmond said, "Right now I feel for my dad; my stepmother, Marylin; and her mom, Mrs. Phelps. We thought this was all behind us. I don't celebrate Hooper's death. But I won't or didn't oppose it. He made choices in his life that were bad and led to New Year's Eve 1980. Forty-two years later, and we are dealing with our father's death again. I thought it was all past us. It is hard to understand right now. Just glad it is all over, and maybe everyone can finally be at peace."

When asked to give his last words, Hooper said, "It's all been said. Let it be done. To all my lawyers and loved ones, don't be sad for me, don't cry. Don't say goodbye, but say, I'll see you later. Let's go." Hooper maintained his innocence to the very end.

== See also ==
- Capital punishment in Arizona
- List of longest prison sentences served
- List of people executed in Arizona
- List of people executed in the United States in 2022

Executions carried out in Arizona
| Preceded by Frank Jarvis Atwood June 8, 2022 | Murray Hooper; November 16, 2022 | Succeeded by Aaron Gunches March 19, 2025 |
Executions carried out in the United States
| Preceded by Tracy Lane Beatty – Texas November 9, 2022 | Murray Hooper – Arizona; November 16, 2022 | Succeeded by Stephen Dale Barbee – Texas November 16, 2022 |
