= Murder of Vicki Lynne Hoskinson =

American girl abducted in Tucson, AZ (1984)

Vicki Lynne Hoskinson
- Born: February 2, 1976
- Died: c. September 17, 1984 (aged 8)
- Cause of death: Murder by stabbing
- Body discovered: April 12, 1985; Sonoran Desert near Tucson

Vicki Lynne Hoskinson (February 2, 1976 – c. September 17, 1984) was an 8‑year-old American girl who disappeared in Tucson, Arizona while riding her bicycle to mail a birthday card to her aunt, and was eventually found murdered. Her abductor, Frank Jarvis Atwood (January 29, 1956 – June 8, 2022), was traced through witness testimony and physical evidence, which the abductor alleged in a later appeal was planted on his car. Seven months later, Vicki's remains were found in a desert area 20 miles (32 km) away and Atwood was found guilty of first degree murder. He was sentenced to death and executed by lethal injection on June 8, 2022.

== Background ==
On Monday, September 17, 1984, Vicki's mom asked Vicki to take a letter to a mailbox to mail a birthday card to her aunt. This was the first time Carlson had allowed any of her children to go out on their own, previously using the buddy system. After 20 minutes, Carlson sent Vicki's 11-year-old sister Stephanie to look for her; Stephanie found Vicki's bicycle lying on the side of the road a few blocks away, and one block from the elementary school. Carlson placed Vicki's bicycle in her car trunk and called the Pima County Sheriff's Department. Detective Gary Dhaemers responded, and a few hours later a command center was set up.

== Apprehension of suspect ==
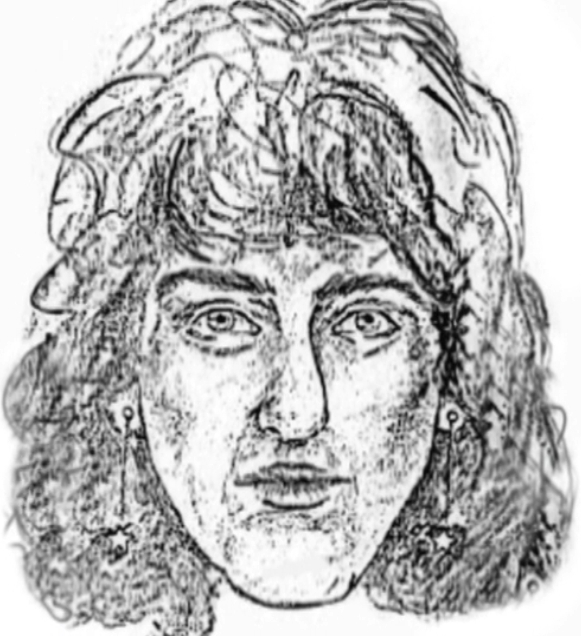
Initial FBI composite of a woman seen with a child matching Hoskinson's description prior to Frank Atwood being identified as the perpetrator.

Not long after Hoskinson's abduction was publicized, a tipster reported seeing a young girl matching the victim's description in a store, accompanied by an adult woman. A composite sketch was created of the girl's companion, but eventually, police determined the sighting was unrelated to the abduction of Hoskinson.

After interviews with possible witnesses, Sam Hall, a coach at an elementary school, stated he saw a suspicious-looking driver parked in a vehicle in an alley beside the school on the day Vicki disappeared. Hall had been supervising a group of students at play when he noticed a suspicious vehicle. According to Hall, the driver was making strange gestures and was struggling with the manual gearshift lever. He memorized the license plate, ran to his car to get a notepad and wrote it down. He later gave it to the police after hearing Vicki was missing. A little girl said the driver made an obscene gesture to her as he cruised by her house. Another saw the driver back into a telephone pole.

The trace on the license plate led to a 28-year-old Los Angeles man named Frank Jarvis Atwood. Agents ran a background check and found kidnapping and child molestation charges. Atwood was out on parole in California for sexual abuse of an 8-year old boy. They went to the address where Atwood's vehicle was registered. It was the home of Atwood's parents, Frank Jarvis Atwood Sr., a retired army brigadier general, and his wife, who was more protective of their son. A few hours later, Atwood called his parents stating his car had broken down in Texas and he needed money wired to get it fixed. His mother wrote down the address in Kerrville, Texas, where Atwood awaited a new transmission. His father copied the information and drove to a nearby payphone and reported the address to the FBI. FBI agents in Texas detained Atwood and his traveling companion, James McDonald, at the mechanic shop on September 20 and impounded the car.

During questioning, Atwood told investigators he was in Vicki's neighborhood on September 17, the day she disappeared, staying in a nearby park. About 3:00 pm, he left to buy drugs and returned to the park about 5:00 pm, but did not say where he was during the two-hour period. McDonald corroborated Atwood's story and told investigators that he and Atwood had an argument in the park about 3:00. After that, Atwood left for two hours and returned with bloodstains on his hands and clothing. Atwood told McDonald he got into a fight with a drug dealer and stabbed him. Investigators found two men who claimed Atwood spent two nights in their trailer. One of them, known as Mad Dog, claimed Atwood's clothes and hands were bloodstained, and that they had suggested Atwood get rid of his clothes. Atwood told them that he stabbed a double-crossing drug dealer.

== Evidence ==
While no physical evidence inside the car could be linked to Vicki's person, accident reconstruction experts matched pink paint on the front bumper of Atwood's vehicle to the color of the paint on Vicki's bike, and traced damage to the car's gravel pan to one of the bike's pedals. Traces of nickel plating from the bumper were also found on the bike. Returning to the site where the bike was found, investigators discovered damage to the mailbox post about 12 inches above ground, consistent with the height of Atwood's sports car, and believed this to be the spot where the car allegedly struck Vicki's bike at a slow speed. Atwood's clothing from the day of Vicki's disappearance was never recovered.

== Arrest and kidnapping trial ==
Mug shot of Atwood

Ten days after Vicki's disappearance, Atwood was arrested and charged with one count of kidnapping. A month after Vicki's disappearance, Atwood was extradited from Texas to Arizona to answer the charge against him. On December 3, 1984, Atwood pleaded not guilty to kidnapping charges. Because of the publicity of the case in Tucson, the trial was moved to Phoenix. Jury selection took almost 6 weeks.

== Discovery of remains ==
On April 12, 1985, a hiker found a small human skull in the Sonoran Desert near Tucson, about 20 miles (32 km) from where the bike had been found. The skeleton had been scattered by animals. Due to the state of the remains, the cause of death could not be determined, nor whether the child had been sexually abused. Dental records confirmed they were Vicki's remains. Traces of adipocere found on the skull fixed the time that the body had been placed in the desert to within 48 hours of Vicki's disappearance.

== Death sentence ==
Atwood's trial began in January 1987. He was found guilty of first degree murder on March 26, and was sentenced to death on May 8, 1987. During his years on death row, Atwood had, as described by Hoskinson's mother, "gotten married, been baptized in the Greek Orthodox Church, obtained two associate degrees, a bachelor's degree in English/pre-law and a master's degree in literature. He has written six books, five of which have been published. He's also working with people on the outside to create a website." He claimed that police tampered with the evidence found on his car, and that no physical evidence had been found placing Vicki in his car. His appeals for judicial re-review of his case were denied.

In April 2021, Atwood was one of twenty Arizona death row inmates who had exhausted all their appeals. On April 6, 2021, Attorney General Mark Brnovich announced that his office was seeking to file an execution warrant for Atwood. As he was convicted of his crime before November 26, 1992, he would be allowed to choose either lethal injection or gas inhalation as his preferred method to die. Atwood did not select a method, so it defaulted to lethal injection as per Arizona law.

== Execution of Atwood ==
On May 3, 2022, the Arizona Supreme Court set an execution date for Atwood for June 8, 2022. Clemency was unanimously rejected on May 24, 2022.

The following day, May 25, Frank Atwood made a public statement regarding his decades in prison ”I will at long last experience freedom from the earthly bonds that have crippled my body and caused me excruciating pain. And I will no longer live in a world in which others are caused pain by my very existence.

Also, he maintained his innocence and expressed his compassion for Vicki’s family: ”To the family of Vicki Lynn Hoskinson, I can honestly say that while I know you will never believe that I did not take her … I did not! That, however, does not change the fact that your pain is as real as anything possible in this lifetime can possibly be, and my profound prayer is that my death will give you and yours some form of relief and closure from your unending misery and torment.”

Atwood was executed by lethal injection at the state prison in Florence, Arizona, on June 8, 2022. In his last statement, Atwood maintained his innocence. His last words were: "Thank you, precious father, for coming today and shepherding me into faith. I want to thank my beautiful wife who has loved me with everything she has. I want to thank my friends and legal team, and most of all, Jesus Christ through this unfair judicial process that led to my salvation. I pray the Lord will have mercy on all of us and that the Lord will have mercy on me."

He was pronounced dead at 10:16 a.m.

== Legacy ==
After her daughter's murder, Debbie Carlson became a victims' rights activist. She helped establish a victims' advocacy group called "We the People"; worked for the passage of Arizona's Victims' Bill of Rights, which was passed in 1990; and helped institute Southern Arizona's Amber alert system in 2000.

The case was covered in the third season of Forensic Files and The FBI Files.

== See also ==
- Disappearance of Etan Patz
- List of people executed in Arizona
- List of people executed in the United States in 2022
- List of solved missing person cases (1980s)
- Murder of Leiby Kletzky

Executions carried out in Arizona
Preceded by Clarence Dixon May 11, 2022	Frank Jarvis Atwood; June 8, 2022	Succeeded by Murray Hooper November 16, 2022
Executions carried out in the United States
Preceded by Clarence Dixon – Arizona May 11, 2022	Frank Jarvis Atwood – Arizona; June 8, 2022	Succeeded by Joe Nathan James Jr. – Alabama July 28, 2022
