= Carl Wayne Buntion =

American murderer (1944–2022)

- Born: March 30, 1944; Harris County, Texas, U.S.
- Died: April 21, 2022 (aged 78); Huntsville Unit, Texas, U.S.
- Status: Executed by lethal injection
- Motive: To avoid arrest
- Convictions: Capital murder Sexual assault of a child Burglary of a motor vehicle Burglary (2 counts); Unauthorized use of a motor vehicle Damage to property Possession of narcotic drugs Theft
- Penalty: Death (1991)

Details
- Date: June 27, 1990
- Killed: 1
- Weapon: .357 Magnum revolver

Carl Wayne Buntion (March 30, 1944 – April 21, 2022) was an American man convicted of capital murder in Texas and sentenced to death. On April 21, 2022, at the age of 78, he became the oldest inmate to be executed in Texas and the state's first execution of 2022.

== Early life ==
Buntion was born on March 30, 1944. When he was a child, his father murdered a man in front of one of his sons and was violent towards his whole family. In one incident, he smashed his wife's teeth. Buntion sustained broken bones from the abuse, and he said he had post-traumatic stress disorder because of it. One of his brothers served a twenty-year sentence for an unrelated crime.

== Criminal activity ==
Buntion had a lengthy criminal history prior to the murder, starting with a theft conviction in 1961. Over the years, he gathered convictions for burglary, damage to property, and possession of narcotic drugs.

At the time of the shooting, Buntion had been on parole, after serving thirteen months of a fifteen-year sentence for sexually assaulting a child. On April 10, 1971, his twin brother, Kenneth Buntion, was killed by two police officers during a shootout. At the time, Buntion had supposedly vowed to avenge his brother's death. In addition, he had allegedly told a companion that he would rather shoot it out with police than be sent back to prison.

== Murder of James Irby ==
On June 27, 1990, Buntion was the passenger in a vehicle that was pulled over by 37-year-old Houston Police Department officer James Irby. Irby began speaking with the driver, and Buntion exited the vehicle and shot Irby once in the head. Irby fell to the ground, and Buntion shot Irby twice in the back. Buntion fled the scene, shooting at others who were nearby. After killing Irby, Buntion tried to shoot at a driver during a carjacking attempt, fired at another officer, and held another person at gunpoint before he was arrested. Buntion was apprehended in a nearby building.

=== Legal proceedings ===
In 1991, a jury found Buntion guilty of capital murder. He was sentenced to death on January 24, 1991. The Texas Court of Criminal Appeals vacated Buntion's death sentence in 2009. Buntion went to trial again in 2012. At the trial, his brother testified about their childhood. On March 6, 2012, Buntion was again sentenced to death by a jury.

In 2020, a three-judge panel of the United States Court of Appeals for the Fifth Circuit ruled that "the fact that Buntion has behaved peacefully while in prison does not disprove the jury's probability calculation." The court stated that the U.S. Supreme Court has upheld the constitutionality of juries weighing future danger.

Buntion's lawyers appealed to the United States Supreme Court. In October 2021, the Supreme Court denied Buntion's appeal. In a statement following the denial, Justice Stephen Breyer said that Buntion's "lengthy confinement, and the confinement of others like him, calls into question the constitutionality of the death penalty."

On December 8, 2021, Buntion's lawyers filed a state habeas application which claimed that it would be cruel and unusual punishment to execute Buntion given the amount of time he had spent incarcerated and that he did not pose a danger to other prisoners or staff. The application was dismissed.

On March 30, 2022, Buntion's lawyers asked the Texas Board of Pardons and Paroles to commute Buntion's death sentence to a lesser sentence or to give him a ninety-day reprieve. They argued that Buntion's sentence should be commuted because it was imposed by a jury that wrongly predicted he would pose a future danger to fellow inmates. They also stated that Buntion's physical impairments, including sciatic nerve pain that sometimes required him to use a wheelchair, would prevent him from harming anyone else should he be released. Additionally, the lawyers asked for a ninety-day reprieve to determine if Buntion would have access to his spiritual adviser during the execution based on the recent Supreme Court decision in Ramirez v. Collier. On April 19, 2022, the Texas Board of Pardons and Paroles rejected Buntion's request for commutation or clemency, voting unanimously against Buntion.

== Execution ==
One week prior to Buntion's scheduled execution, he contracted pneumonia, which makes lethal injection more painful. On his return from the hospital, where he received treatment for pneumonia, Buntion received a head injury when the vehicle he was being transported in came to a sudden stop. In an interview shortly before his execution, Buntion expressed remorse, saying, "Every day for the last 32 years I have regretted what happened."

Buntion was executed by a lethal injection of pentobarbital on April 21, 2022, and was pronounced dead at 6:39 p.m. CDT. Prior to his death, Buntion stated "I wanted the Irby family to know one thing: I do have remorse for what I did. I pray to God that they get the closure for me killing their father and Ms. Irby's husband... To all of my friends that stuck with me through all of these years, I am not going to say 'goodbye,' just saying 'so long.' I am ready to go to Heaven, warden." Several dozen motorcyclists, including motorcycle officers from the Houston Police Department and retired officers from motorcycle clubs gathered outside the Huntsville Unit and revved their engines at the time of the execution. Those attending the execution stated they could hear the noise, with some calling it "disrespectful" and "disgusting."

In an interview about a week before the execution, Maura Irby, James Irby's widow, stated, "My whole adult life, I've spent saving lives and helping people. So the idea of condoning taking a life has been a challenge. It was from the beginning when we went through the first trial...But it's not about revenge...it's about justice." Following the execution, Maura Irby said "I felt like I took the deepest breath I was able to in the last 32 years. I felt joy." Maura Irby also said that she was sorry someone died, but that she did not think of Buntion as a person but as a thing.

== Personal life ==
At one point, Buntion was a member of the Aryan Brotherhood of Texas. During his time on death row, Buntion found religion and spent time reading his Bible. At the time of his death, Buntion had been diagnosed with vertigo, arthritis, sciatic nerve pain, and other chronic illnesses.

Buntion is buried at Captain Joe Byrd Cemetery.

== See also ==
- List of people executed in Texas, 2020–present
- List of people executed in the United States in 2022

Executions carried out in Texas
Preceded by Rick Allan Rhoades September 28, 2021	Carl Wayne Buntion; April 21, 2022	Succeeded by Kosoul Chanthakoummane August 17, 2022
Executions carried out in the United States
Preceded by Gilbert Postelle – Oklahoma February 17, 2022	Carl Wayne Buntion – Texas; April 21, 2022	Succeeded by Carman Deck – Missouri May 3, 2022
