= Lewis Eugene Gilbert =

American spree killer (1971–2003)

Lewis Eugene Gilbert II
- Born: October 29, 1971; Oklahoma, U.S.
- Died: July 1, 2003 (aged 31); Oklahoma State Penitentiary, Oklahoma, U.S.
- Status: Executed by lethal injection
- Convictions: Oklahoma; First-degree murder Missouri; First-degree murder (x2)
- Penalty: Oklahoma; Death – first-degree murder Missouri; Death (x2) – first-degree murder

Details
- Victims: 3 convicted, 4 total suspected
- Date: August 1994 – September 1994
- Locations: Oklahoma, Missouri, Ohio
- Imprisoned at: Oklahoma State Penitentiary

Lewis Eugene Gilbert II (October 29, 1971 – July 1, 2003) was an American spree killer responsible for a total of four murders committed in 1994 across three different states in the U.S. Gilbert's first murder occurred in Ohio, when he and his 16-year-old accomplice, Eric Elliott, broke into the home of 79-year-old Ruth Lucille Loader on August 29, 1994, and killed her. Loader's body was never found despite Gilbert's confession that he was responsible for her death. The next day, Gilbert and Elliott committed the double murder of William and Flossie Brewer, aged 86 and 76, respectively, at the couple's farm in Missouri. The fourth and final killing happened on September 3, 1994, when both Elliot and Gilbert robbed and murdered 37-year-old off-duty security guard Roxanne Ruddell in Oklahoma.

Gilbert and Elliott were arrested a week after their first offense and both were charged with the murders they committed. After facing trial in Oklahoma, Elliott, a minor, was sentenced to life in prison without parole for the murder of Ruddell, while Gilbert was sentenced to death. Gilbert also received two death sentences in Missouri for the murders of the Brewers. Gilbert did not stand trial for the murder of Loader in Ohio despite his confession. Gilbert was executed by lethal injection in Oklahoma on July 1, 2003.

== Murders ==
Between August and September 1994, over an approximate one-week period, 23-year-old Lewis Eugene Gilbert II and his 16-year-old accomplice, Eric Alvin Elliott, both of whom were residents of Newcomerstown, Ohio, committed the murders of four people across three different states in the U.S.

=== Ruth Lucille Loader ===
On August 29, 1994, in Port Washington, Ohio, 79-year-old Ruth Lucille Loader (March 31, 1915 – August 29, 1994), who was battling cancer, became the first victim of the duo's killing spree. On that date, both Elliott and Gilbert planned to go to California, where Elliott's biological mother lived. Gilbert reportedly wanted to shoot homosexual people there. They needed a car to facilitate their plans. They walked approximately eight miles from Newcomerstown to Loader's house, located outside Port Washington, and noticed her car parked outside. As they searched for the keys, Loader appeared and saw them. A struggle ensued, and the men restrained her using a phone cord before placing her in the trunk of a car. The duo subsequently shot Loader and left her corpse at a field in Ohio before they fled to Missouri.

After the arrest of Elliott and Gilbert for Loader's murder, the search for her corpse went on for at least 20 years, but the searches turned up nothing, and Ruth Loader's body has never been found.

=== William and Flossie Brewer ===
On August 30, 1994, 86-year-old William Forest Brewer (November 10, 1907 – August 30, 1994) and his 76-year-old wife Flossie Mae Brewer (July 31, 1918 – August 30, 1994) became the second and third victims of the crime spree.

Elliott and Gilbert drove the stolen car of Loader to Callaway County, Missouri, where the car got stuck. They managed to reach a nearby farm in Callaway County, where they approached the Brewers, who owned the farm. Both Elliott and Gilbert managed to gain entry after asking the couple if they could use a telephone. The Brewers invited the men inside their house, and after having a short conversation with the Brewers, the men restrained the couple and used telephone cord to bind their hands.

Afterwards, the two men brought the couple down to the basement, where both William and Flossie Brewer were each shot in the head thrice, before the killers stole some valuables and left the farm in the Brewers' car. The couple's bodies were eventually discovered by relatives.

=== Roxanne Ruddell ===
On September 3, 1994, 37-year-old security guard Roxanne "Roxy" Lynn Ruddell (October 11, 1956 – September 3, 1994) became the fourth and final person to be murdered by Gilbert and Elliott. After arriving in Oklahoma, both Gilbert and Elliott drove the Brewers' car to the Lake Stanley Draper. The men witnessed Ruddell fishing alone at the area after she got off work. Formulating a plan to rob Ruddell, the duo approached her and threatened her with a gun. Ruddell begged for mercy and told the men that they could take her truck, but instead, the pair tied Ruddell's hands and made her walk a short distance to sit under a tree, and shot her four times in the head. They also stole her pickup truck and $2 or $3 in cash before fleeing the scene.

== Arrest and charges ==
After the murders, both Lewis Gilbert and Eric Elliott fled to New Mexico. A manhunt was conducted to arrest both the killers, after the police were able to find the evidence and missing vehicles of the victims, mainly Loader's car at the farm of the Brewers, and the Brewers' car at the site of Ruddell's murder near Lake Stanley Draper.

Gilbert and Elliott were arrested at New Mexico approximately three days after murdering Ruddell. After the duo's arrests, the Oklahoma state authorities announced that they would seek the death penalty against both Gilbert and Elliot, who faced multiple charges in relation to the murders they committed in Oklahoma, Missouri and Ohio.

Oklahoma Governor David Walters sent a request to the Governor of New Mexico to extradite the suspects back to Oklahoma to face trial for the murder of Ruddell. The pair were eventually extradited from New Mexico to Oklahoma in December 1994.

== Murder trials and sentencing ==
Between 1995 and 2001, Lewis Gilbert was tried in both Oklahoma and Missouri for the murders of the Brewers and Roxanne Ruddell. However, he did not face trial in Ohio for the murder of Ruth Loader despite confessing to the crime.

=== Oklahoma ===
Gilbert's trial for murdering Roxanne Ruddell commenced on November 2, 1995.

On November 6, 1995, a Cleveland County jury found Gilbert guilty of first-degree murder. In response to the prosecution's request for the death penalty, Gilbert's lawyers asked the jury to spare the life of their client, revealing that he was a victim of horrific child abuse by his two stepfathers during his childhood. Gilbert's family members also revealed that as a student, Gilbert suffered from attention deficit disorder and dyslexia and he was often bullied in school, where he felt inferior to his peers. Gilbert was also said to have had previous run-ins with the law for at least five times but never committed any violent offenses in these past cases, and the defence asked for mercy on account of these factors.

On November 9, 1995, the jury returned with their verdict, recommending a death sentence for Gilbert. District Judge Tom Lucas of the Cleveland County District Court sentenced Gilbert to death during a formal court hearing on January 9, 1996.

As for Eric Elliott, Gilbert's accomplice, he was tried solely for the murder of Ruddell in Oklahoma, and although Elliott's first trial ended with a hung jury and led to the declaration of a mistrial, he pleaded guilty to committing first-degree murder in his re-trial. Despite the prosecution's request for the death penalty, District Judge William Hetherington sentenced Elliot to life imprisonment without the possibility of parole on November 1, 1996.

=== Missouri ===
After Gilbert was sentenced to death in Oklahoma, he was sent back to Missouri in September 2000 to face trial for the double murder of William and Flossie Brewer.

On December 7, 2001, the jury found Gilbert guilty of both counts of first-degree murder for the Brewers' deaths, and the prosecution expressed their intent to seek the death penalty for Gilbert, who would be sent back to Oklahoma's death row upon the end of his sentencing in Missouri. Russell Brewer, one of the Brewers' four children, stated he was glad to know that Gilbert would be facing the death sentence from both Missouri and Oklahoma for his crimes.

Gilbert was eventually given two death sentences for both counts of first-degree murder, as well as life imprisonment and 29 years' imprisonment for the other offenses he was convicted for.

== Appeal process ==
On November 20, 1997, the Oklahoma Court of Criminal Appeals dismissed Gilbert's direct appeal against his death sentence for murdering Roxanne Ruddell.

On March 10, 1998, Gilbert's second appeal to the Oklahoma Court of Criminal Appeals was rejected.

On September 3, 2002, the 10th Circuit Court of Appeals rejected Gilbert's federal appeal against his death sentence from Oklahoma.

On April 22, 2003, the Supreme Court of Missouri turned down Gilbert's direct appeal against his two death sentences for the Brewer murders in Missouri.

On April 28, 2003, the U.S. Supreme Court dismissed Gilbert's final appeal against his death sentence from Oklahoma.

== Execution ==
On April 28, 2003, after the loss of Lewis Gilbert's final appeal to the U.S. Supreme Court, pertaining to his death sentence in Oklahoma, Oklahoma Attorney General Drew Edmondson petitioned to the Oklahoma Court of Criminal Appeals to schedule the execution dates for both Gilbert and another convicted killer Robert Don Duckett (July 1, 1964 – July 8, 2003), the latter who was convicted of murdering a man in 1988.

On May 9, 2003, the Oklahoma Court of Criminal Appeals approved the death warrant of Gilbert, directing that his death sentence should be carried out on July 1, 2003. A clemency hearing was held during the final months leading up to Gilbert's execution, and it was ultimately decided by the state parole board that Gilbert should not receive clemency.

During the final week before Gilbert's execution, Gilbert's lawyers filed an appeal to the U.S. Supreme Court, seeking a stay of execution. They argued that appeals against Gilbert's death sentences in Missouri, related to the murders of William and Flossie Brewer, were still underway. The appellate process in Missouri remained unresolved, as Gilbert claimed he had been represented by allegedly ineffective counsel during his trial for the Brewers' murders.

On July 1, 2003, 31-year-old Gilbert was put to death by lethal injection at the Oklahoma State Penitentiary. He was pronounced dead at 7:11am, three minutes after the drugs were administered to his body. The U.S. Supreme Court denied his appeal for a stay of execution, affirming the Oklahoma Court of Criminal Appeals' decision to proceed with his death sentence in Oklahoma, despite his request for more time to complete his appellate process in Missouri. The final appeal process had delayed the execution of Gilbert for merely an hour before the death sentence was finally carried out.

For his final meal, Gilbert ordered a half-gallon of vanilla ice cream, a box of assorted cones and a box of candy.

Eddie Ruddell, the widowed husband of Roxanne Ruddell, stated that he was still devastated over his wife's death, and he said that Gilbert deserved the death penalty for murdering his wife. Mary Brewer, the daughter-in-law of the Brewers, stated that she found closure with Gilbert's execution. A total of 14 family members and friends of Gilbert's victims were present to witness his execution.

== See also ==
- Capital punishment in Missouri
- Capital punishment in Oklahoma
- List of people executed in Oklahoma
- List of people executed in the United States in 2003
