= Dick Wilkerson =

American politician (born 1943)

Member of the Oklahoma Senate from the 13th district
- In office November 1988 – November 2004
- Preceded by: Billie Jean Floyd
- Succeeded by: Susan Paddack

Personal details
- Born: March 19, 1943 (age 83) Antlers, Oklahoma, U.S.
- Party: Democratic Party
- Education: East Central State University; Oklahoma City University

Dick Wilkerson is an American politician who served in the Oklahoma Senate representing the 13th district from 1988 to 2004.

== Biography ==
Dick Wilkerson was born on March 19, 1943, in Antlers, Oklahoma. He graduated from East Central State University and Oklahoma City University. He worked as a police officer, for the Oklahoma State Bureau of Investigation, and was inducted into the Oklahoma Law Enforcement Hall of Fame in 2017.

Wilkerson served in the Oklahoma Senate as a member of the Democratic Party representing the 13th district from 1988 to 2004. He was preceded in office by Billie Floyd and succeeded in office by Susan Paddack.
