= Oklahoma State Penitentiary =

Prison in McAlester, Oklahoma, U.S

Oklahoma State Penitentiary (OSP)
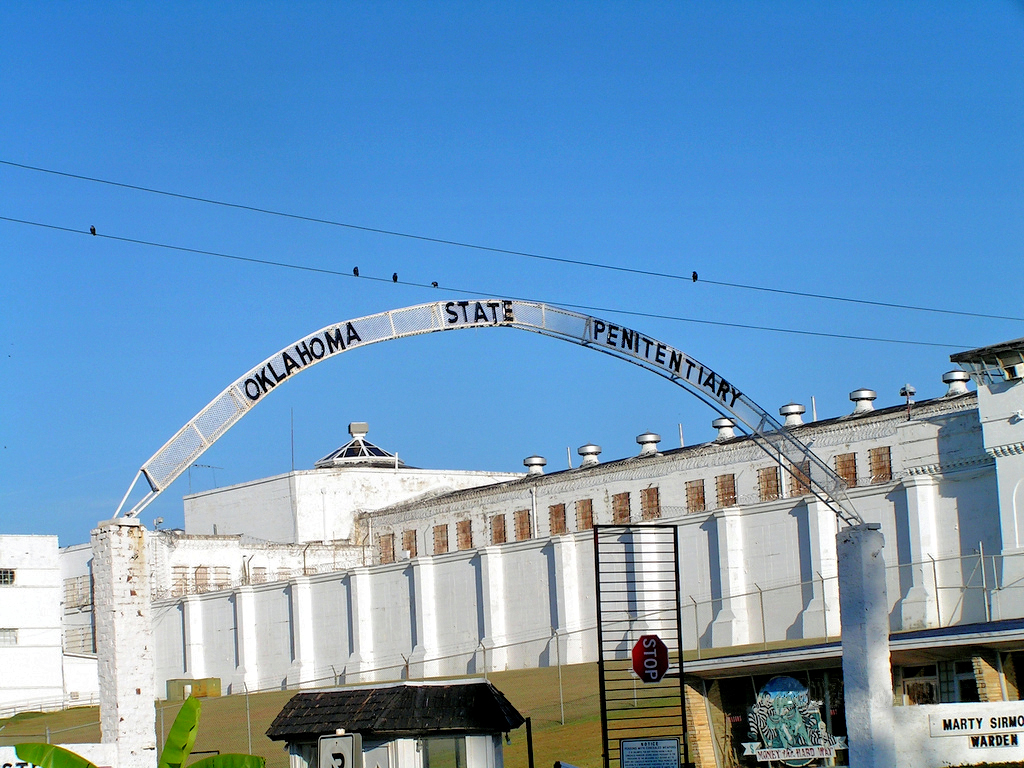

- Location in Oklahoma
- Location: McAlester, Oklahoma; 34°57′16″N 95°46′59″W
- Status: Operational
- Security class: maximum to medium
- Capacity: 764
- Population: 763 (April 10, 2017)
- Opened: 1908; 118 years ago
- Managed by: Oklahoma Department of Corrections
- Warden: Willis Pettit
- Website: Oklahoma Department of Corrections - Oklahoma State Penitentiary

The Oklahoma State Penitentiary, nicknamed "Big Mac", is a prison of the Oklahoma Department of Corrections located in McAlester, Oklahoma, on 1,556 acres (6.30 km^{2}). Opened in 1908 with 50 inmates in makeshift facilities, today the prison holds more than 750 male offenders, the vast majority of which are maximum-security inmates. They also hold many death row prisoners.

== Construction and early years ==
Before Oklahoma became a state in 1907, felons convicted in Oklahoma Territory and Indian Territory were sent to the Kansas State Penitentiary in Lansing, Kansas. At statehood, Kate Barnard became Oklahoma Commissioner of Charities and Corrections. During the summer of 1908, Barnard arrived unannounced at the Kansas prison to investigate widespread complaints she had received about mistreatment of Oklahoma inmates. She took a regular tour with other visitors first, then identified herself to prison officials and asked that she be allowed to conduct an inspection of the facility. Barnard discovered systematic, widespread torture of inmates.

Upon her return to Oklahoma, Barnard recommended that all Oklahoma inmates be removed from the Lansing facility and returned to the state. Governor of Oklahoma Charles N. Haskell supported Barnard's proposal, and within two months of Barnard's visit to Kansas, on October 14, 1908, two groups of 50 offenders each were sent by train to McAlester. The inmates were temporarily housed in the former federal jail in the town. Under direction from Warden Robert W. Dick, they built a stockade to house themselves on a 120 acres (0.49 km^{2}) plot northwest of McAlester, which was donated to the state by a group of McAlester citizens.

The remaining Oklahoma inmates in Lansing were moved to the United States Penitentiary, Leavenworth until the state could build adequate facilities to house them all. The next spring, in 1909, the Oklahoma Legislature appropriated $850,000 to build the permanent facility.

Construction began in May 1909 on a prison designed after the Leavenworth facility. The state purchased about 1,556 acres (6.30 km^{2}) surrounding the original plot of land. Using prison labor, the West Cellhouse and Administration Building were completed first; the Rotunda and East Cellhouse came later. The steep hills and grades required more than 6,250 cubic yards (4,780 m^{3}) of concrete and more than 2,000,000 cubic yards (1,500,000 m^{3}) of rocks and soil to be moved for the prison's walls alone. The F Cellhouse was added in 1935, and later the New Cellhouse was constructed. A shoe manufacturing plant and a tailor shop were part of the prison's inmate industry program, designed to provide work for offenders; at Lansing, prisoners were forced to work in the local mines, a practice Barnard banned. The Warden's House, across the street from the prison, is listed on the National Register of Historic Places.

Female prisoners were sent to Kansas in territorial days also. The first females brought back from Kansas stayed in a ward near the East Gate, built in 1911, on the fourth floor of the West Cellhouse. The female population had grown to 26 by the time a separate building about 1 mile (1.6 km) west of the main institution was completed in 1926.

=== Later additions ===
The Talawanda Heights Minimum Security Unit was opened outside the East Gate Area in October 1989 to house inmates who hold support jobs inside the facility. In 1992, a special care unit opened to provide mental health care to offenders, reducing the need for psychiatric hospitalization outside the prison. A medium security unit with a capacity of 140 inmates is located on G and I units to help prisoners adjust to a lower security classification.

Another addition to the prison, H Unit, houses inmates under both administrative and disciplinary segregation. H Unit is also the site of Oklahoma's death row and the state's lethal injection death chamber.

== Escapes, riots, and lawsuits ==
The first prison escape (from behind the walls) occurred on January 19, 1914. Three inmates stole a gun and killed three prison employees and retired federal judge John Robert Thomas during the escape attempt. The convicts were later killed behind a rock ledge located on a ridge overlooking a wagon road.

=== 1973 McAlester Prison Riot ===
By 1970 Oklahoma's prison system was described by experts as "one of the most 'inefficient, archaic, and corrupt' prison systems in the country." Facilities were understaffed with improperly trained workers, raw sewage backed up into cells, and the State Penitentiary was at 219% capacity. Facilities were still racially segregated. During this time, staff at the facility worked out a deal with "convict bosses" in the prison, giving them privileges in exchange for helping manage other prisoners. Bosses were in charge of assigning jobs in the prison and generally sold them. Black prisoners could only purchase menial labor positions. From 1970 until July 27, 1973, the facility cataloged 19 violent deaths, 40 stabbings and 44 serious beatings. On January 22, 1973, prisoners staged a hunger strike that lasted 3 days in an attempt to draw attention to the conditions at the facility. Rumors of an impending riot circulated the facility for months before the riot. Other contributing factors to the riot included the increased politicization of prisoners in the early 1970s and the summer heat.

On the morning of July 27, 1973, the trouble began in the mess hall when correction officers attempted to detain a man who entered drunk. When officers tried to detain him, they were overpowered by prisoners who quickly seized the PA system. When McAlester News-Capitol reporter Randy Pruitt arrived sometime after 2 p.m., an inmate was on the PA system encouraging prisoners to join the "revolution" in the facility. 23 people were taken hostage by approximately 1,300 inmates. Members of the 445th Military Police Company of the Oklahoma National Guard, Federal Bureau of Investigation, Oklahoma State Bureau of Investigation, Oklahoma Highway Patrol, Oklahoma Department of Corrections, Oklahoma City Police Department, and Tulsa Police Department were deployed to quell the riot. By evening the facility was surrounded and no one was allowed in or out except for the prison chaplain, Friar Donald Brooks, and Pruitt who accompanied him.

A plan to storm the facility Saturday morning may have been delayed because inmates threatened they had stockpiled gasoline and would douse and ignite officers when they entered the facility from higher floors. Inmates negotiated with a delegation representing the state that included three national guardsmen, Wade Watts, Oklahoma Public Safety Commissioner Wayne Lawson, Oklahoma Director of the Department of Corrections Leo McKracken and Warden Park Anderson. Inmates initially demanded the state tell people about poor conditions at the facility, but negotiators responded the riot itself had already done that. Negotiations concluded by Sunday and that afternoon reporters were allowed to tour the facility with one reportedly commenting "it's a hell of a way to get a new prison." At the end of the riot, three inmates were dead, 12 buildings were burned, and 21 inmates and guards had been injured. Damage was estimated at $30 million.

==== Battle v. Anderson ====
Judge Luther Bohanon found in Battle v. Anderson that conditions at OSP unconstitutional and he later supervised the facility's reform. The lawsuit, filed by one inmate before the riot, was changed to a class action suit after the riot. Bohannon put the Department of Correction under federal control. The last issue of the lawsuit, medical care for offenders, was settled 27 years later, in 2001.

Consequent to the court's orders, four new housing units were built at OSP, and in 1984 the aging East and West Cellhouses were closed. In 1983, all female inmates were moved to Mabel Bassett Correctional Center in Oklahoma City.

=== Other riots ===
On December 17, 1985, the inmates became disruptive, then gained control and took five employees as hostages on A and C units. Three of the hostages were seriously injured before their release the next day. The disturbance caused more than $375,000 in damage and two of the hostages were permanently disabled. After this incident, security was overhauled at the prison to reduce inmate movements, limit recreation, and institute a level-ranking system for offenders to improve safety.

== Death Row and executions ==
Between 1915 and 2014, Oklahoma executed a total of 192 men and 3 women. 3 different methods of execution have been employed by the state. Lethal injection, which was first used on September 10, 1990, has been used 120 times. Other execution methods have included the hanging of a federal prisoner, and 82 electrocutions using the electric chair commonly referred to as "Old Sparky", a method that was last performed in 1966.

== Prison rodeo ==
Starting in 1940, except for a handful of years during World War II and during the 1970s inmate uprising, OSP held a prison rodeo until 2009. A two-day event was held in August, or on Labor Day weekend (accounts differ), the rodeo was a joint venture between the city of McAlester and the state Department of Corrections. The McAlester Chamber of Commerce contracted with the city to coordinate and market the event, which was last held in 2009 due to a state budget shortfall starting in 2010. Inmates from several prisons throughout the state competed. Attendance at the 12,500-seat arena was down in the 2000s from the 65,000 who routinely attended during a four-day version of the event in the 1960s. The animal-rights group PETA denounced the rodeo on grounds of animal cruelty.

Female convicts began competing in 2006, leading to the documentary film, Sweethearts of the Prison Rodeo (2009), about the co-ed competition.

As of 2021, the rodeo had still not returned, despite support from the warden and Governor Kevin Stitt. The biggest barrier remained the cost of restoring the arena.

== Use in popular culture ==
The prison was mentioned in:

- The Grapes of Wrath and in the Woody Guthrie song The Ballad Of Tom Joad, which was based on the book
- The Innocent Man: Murder and Injustice in a Small Town, a nonfiction book by John Grisham
- Dirty White Boys, a fiction book by Stephen Hunter
- The Outsider, a novel by Stephen King
- The Longest Yard includes a scene where a player says he played football at Oklahoma State. When prompted further he says "Oklahoma State Penitentiary"

The facility is shown in scenes of the movie Heaven's Rain by Paul Brown and Brooks Douglass.

== Notable prisoners ==
=== Current ===
Inmate Name	Register Number	Status	Details
Robert D. Bever	748422	Serving multiple life sentences without parole.	One of the two perpetrators of the 2015 Broken Arrow murders in which Robert, and his brother, Michael Bever, stabbed to death their parents, and 3 of their siblings.
Jacob England	690064	Serving a life sentence without parole.	Committed 3 murders with another man, Alvin Watts, in Tulsa in 2012.

- Richard Glossip (Sentenced to death in relation to the murder of Barry Van Treese by Justin Sneed.)
- Julius Jones (Originally sentenced to death, commuted to life in prison without the possibility of parole.)
- David Anthony Ware (Murder of Police Officer. Sentenced to death.)

=== Former ===
- C. L. Harkins – Wealthy veterinary surgeon, convicted of rape. Acquitted of three counts of murder.
- Charles Coleman (Executed on September 10, 1990) – Convicted murderer who was the first person to be executed in Oklahoma since 1966.
- Thomas J. Grasso (Executed on March 20, 1995) – Convicted murderer who was executed for strangling an 87-year-old woman.
- Roger Dale Stafford (Executed on July 1, 1995) – Convicted serial killer sentenced to death on Oct. 17, 1979, and spent over 15 years on death row for the 1978 Lorenz-Sirloin Stockade murders.
- Clayton Lockett (Executed on April 29, 2014) – Convicted of a 1999 murder, rape and kidnapping. Lockett's execution made headlines for the series of events that took place during his execution, resulting in the Governor ordering a review of the execution process.
- John Marion Grant (Executed on October 28, 2021) – Convicted of a 1998 murder. His execution was the first in over six years and generated controversy.
- Nannie Doss – Female serial killer who died of Leukemia while incarcerated in the Penitentiary.
- Karl Myers – Murderer and suspected serial killer who was given two death sentences for the sexually motivated murders of two women killed in 1993 and 1996. Died on December 28, 2012, from natural causes.
- Bigler Stouffer – Murderer found guilty of shooting a schoolteacher to death in 1985. Executed on December 9, 2021.
- James Allen Coddington – Convicted of murdering his 73-year-old friend and co-worker. Executed on August 25, 2022.
- Phillip Dean Hancock – Convicted double killer who shot two men in 2001 at Oklahoma City. Executed on November 30, 2023.
- Richard Norman Rojem Jr. – Convicted of the 1984 rape and murder of his stepdaughter. Executed on June 27, 2024. Rojem was the longest-serving death row inmate in Oklahoma at the time of his execution.
- Emmanuel Littlejohn – Convicted of the 1992 murder of Kenneth Meers. Executed on September 26, 2024.
- Kevin Ray Underwood – Convicted of the 2006 murder of 10-year-old Jamie Rose Bolin. Executed on December 19, 2024.
- Lewis Eugene Gilbert – convicted of the murder of Roxy Ruddell in 1994, and also charged in Ohio and Missouri for three other murders. Executed on July 1, 2003.
- Steven Ray Thacker – convicted of the rape and murder of Laci Dawn Hill in 1999, and also charged in both Missouri and Tennessee with two more murders. Executed on March 12, 2013.
- George John Hanson – Sentenced to death for murders of Mary Agnes Bowles and Jerald Max Thurman alongside his accomplice Victor Cornell Miller. Executed on June 12, 2025.

== See also ==
- List of people executed in Oklahoma (since 1976)
- William S. Key, Major General and Warden of Oklahoma State Penitentiary 1924-1927

== Works cited ==
- Bullard, Claudia K. (Spring 2024). "The Oklahoma National Guard and the 1973 McAlester Prison Riot". Chronicles of Oklahoma. 102 (1): 4–29.
