= List of people executed by lethal injection =

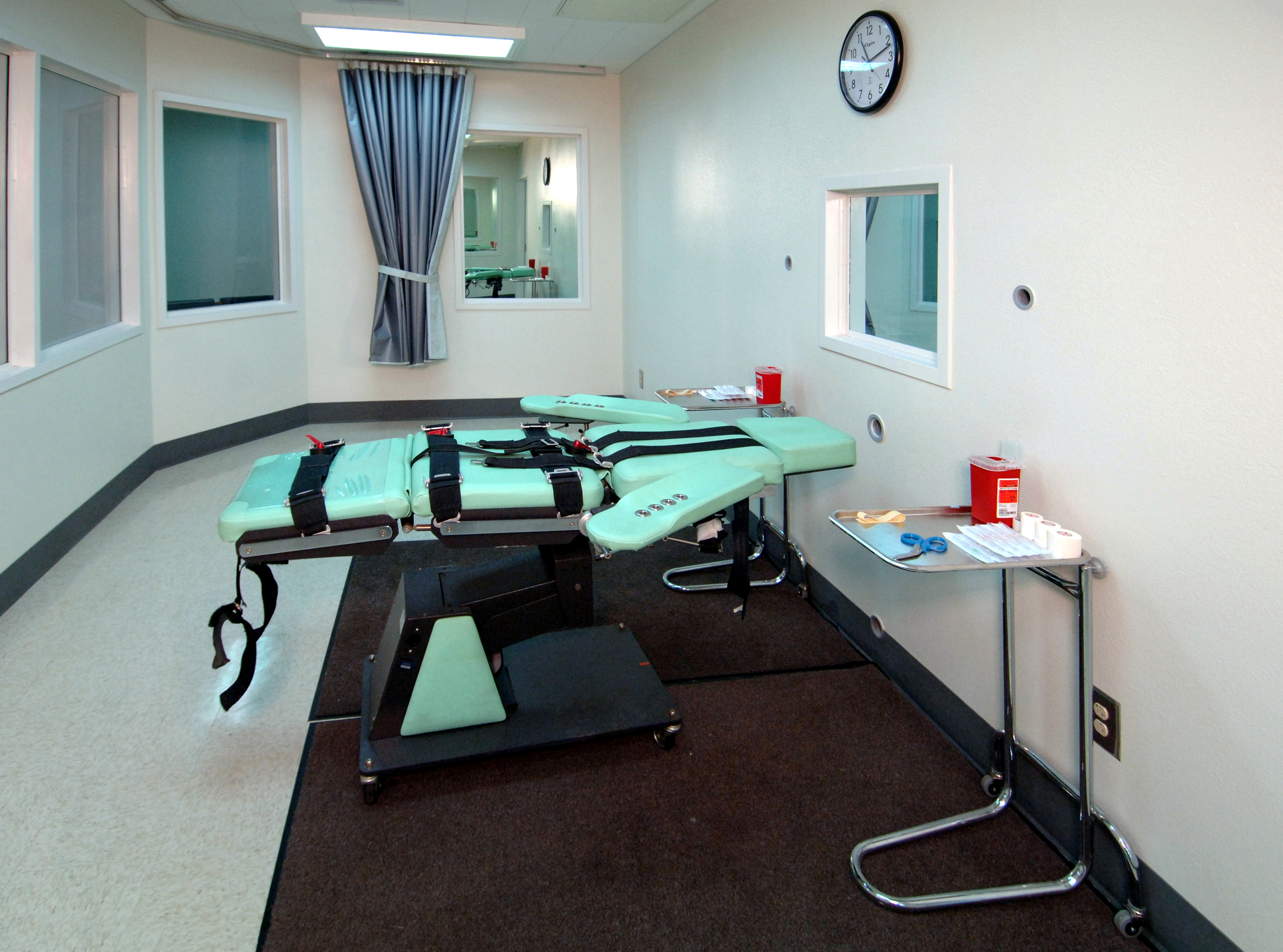
The former lethal execution room in the San Quentin State Prison in California, which was dismantled in 2019.

Lethal injection is the practice of injecting one or more drugs into a person by a government for the express purpose of causing immediate death. While Nazi Germany was known to murder "enemies of the state" using an injection of lethal drugs, the first country to legalise and formally implement what is referred to today as lethal injection was the United States. The state of Texas adopted it as its form on capital punishment in 1977 and executed the first person by it, Charles Brooks Jr., in 1982. The practice was subsequently adopted by the other US states using capital punishment. As of 2026, the method is available for use by 27 US states, as well as by the federal government and military.

Lethal injection was proposed and adopted on the grounds it was more humane than the methods of execution in place at the time, such as the electric chair and gas chamber. Opponents of lethal injection reject this argument, noting multiple cases where executions have been painful and/or prolonged. According to the Death Penalty Information Center, lethal injections have the highest rate of botched executions of any method used in the US, at 7.12% between 1982 and 2010. A study published in The Lancet in 2005 found that in 43% of cases of lethal injection, the blood level of hypnotics was insufficient to guarantee unconsciousness. The Supreme Court of the United States ruled 7–2 in 2008 (Baze v. Rees), 5–4 in 2015 (Glossip v. Gross), and 5–4 in 2019 (Bucklew v. Precythe) that lethal injection does not constitute cruel and unusual punishment.

Lethal injection was also adopted as a method of execution by Guatemala in 1996 (no executions since 2000), China in 1997, the Philippines in 1999 (later abolished in 2006), Thailand in 2003 (no executions since 2018), Taiwan in 2005 (never used), Vietnam in 2013, the Maldives in 2014 (no executions since 1954), and Nigeria in 2015 (no executions since 2016). The United States, China, and Vietnam comprise the vast majority of use. The US had executed 1 498 people via lethal injection as of 9 November 2026. The number of people executed annually in China is estimated to surpass all other countries combined, though statistics are a state secret.

This alphabetical list features notable executions up to August 2026, and only those where lethal injection can be reliably sourced to be the method used. The criterion for notability is either an article on the individual, the crime they were executed for, or a court case related to their execution, in the English Wikipedia.

== Executions ==
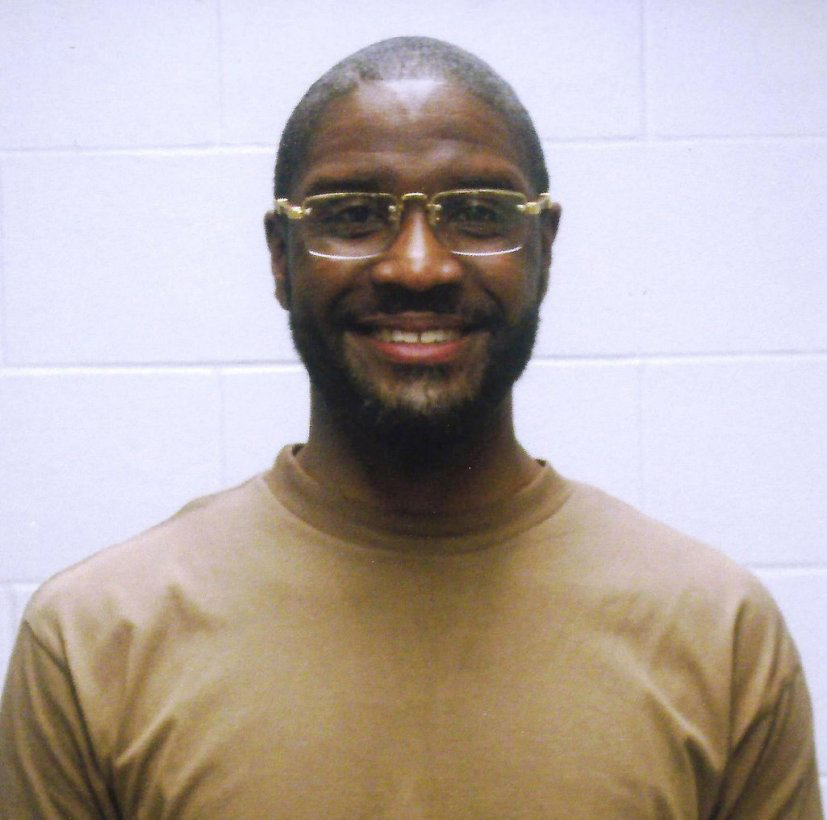
In December 2020, Brandon Bernard became the 9th federal prisoner to be executed in the US, following the Trump administration's reinstatement of federal executions six-months earlier, after a 17-year hiatus.

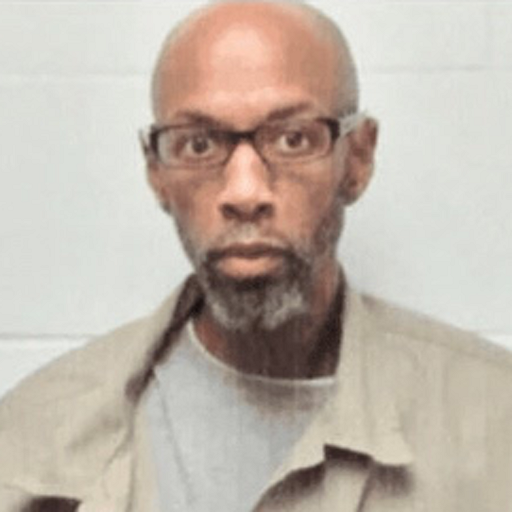
The execution of Dustin Higgs was controversial. Higgs was sentenced for coercing someone to commit murder; the man who committed the murders later denied Higgs had influenced him.

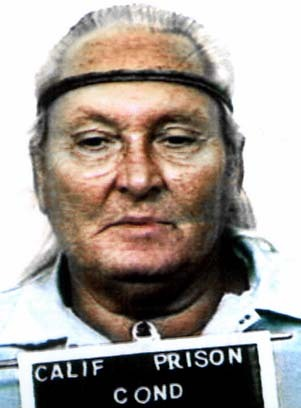
At 76, Clarence Ray Allen was one of the oldest people executed in the US.

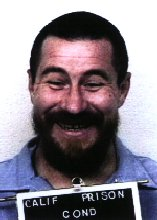
Stephen Wayne Anderson was executed in California in 2002 for murder.

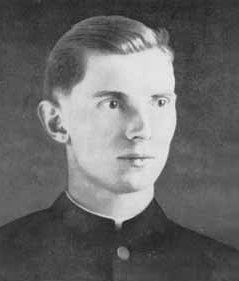
Alojs Andritzki, a Catholic priest, was executed by the Nazi regime at Dachau concentration camp.

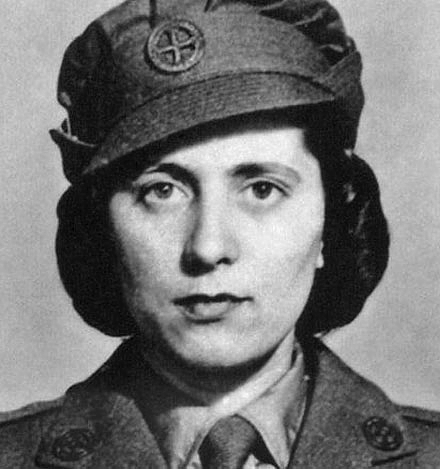
Andrée Borrel, a member of Britain's Special Operations Executive, was executed by the Nazis with an injection of phenol.

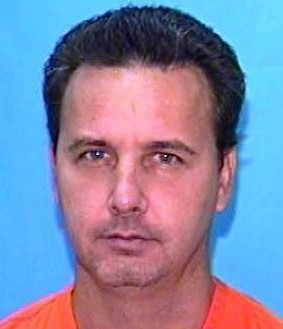
Gary Ray Bowles, also known as the I-95 Killer, was executed in 2019 for the murders of six men in 1994.

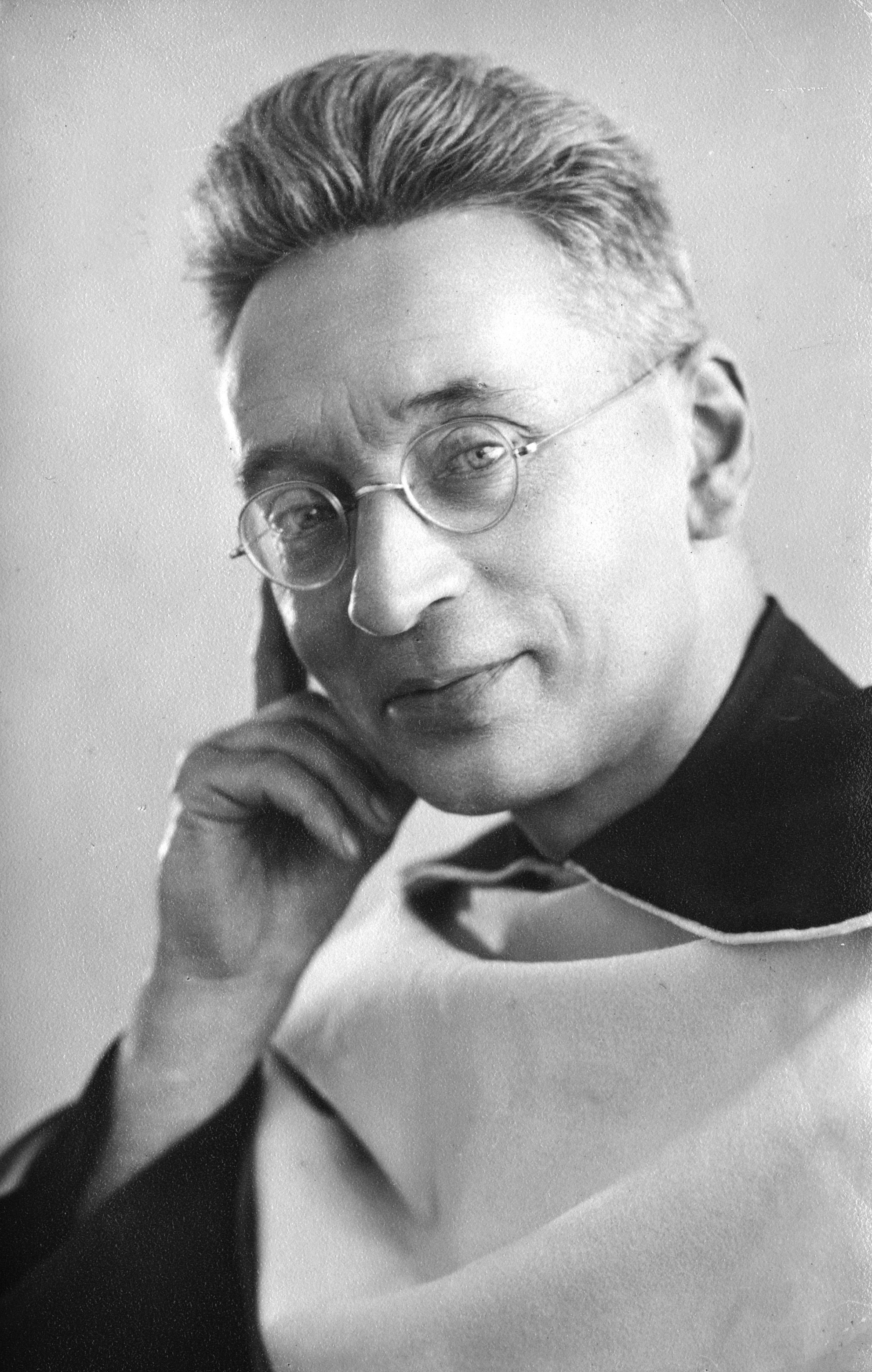
Titus Brandsma, a Catholic priest, was executed for opposing the Nazi regime.

Richard Cartwright was the main contributor to Uncensored from Texas Death Row until his execution.

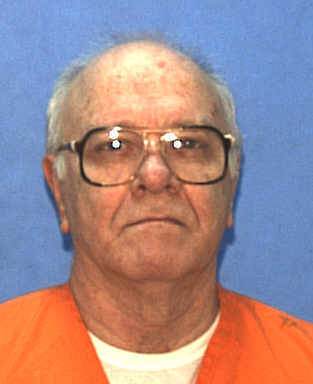
Oba Chandler, executed in 2011 for three murders, maintained his innocence.

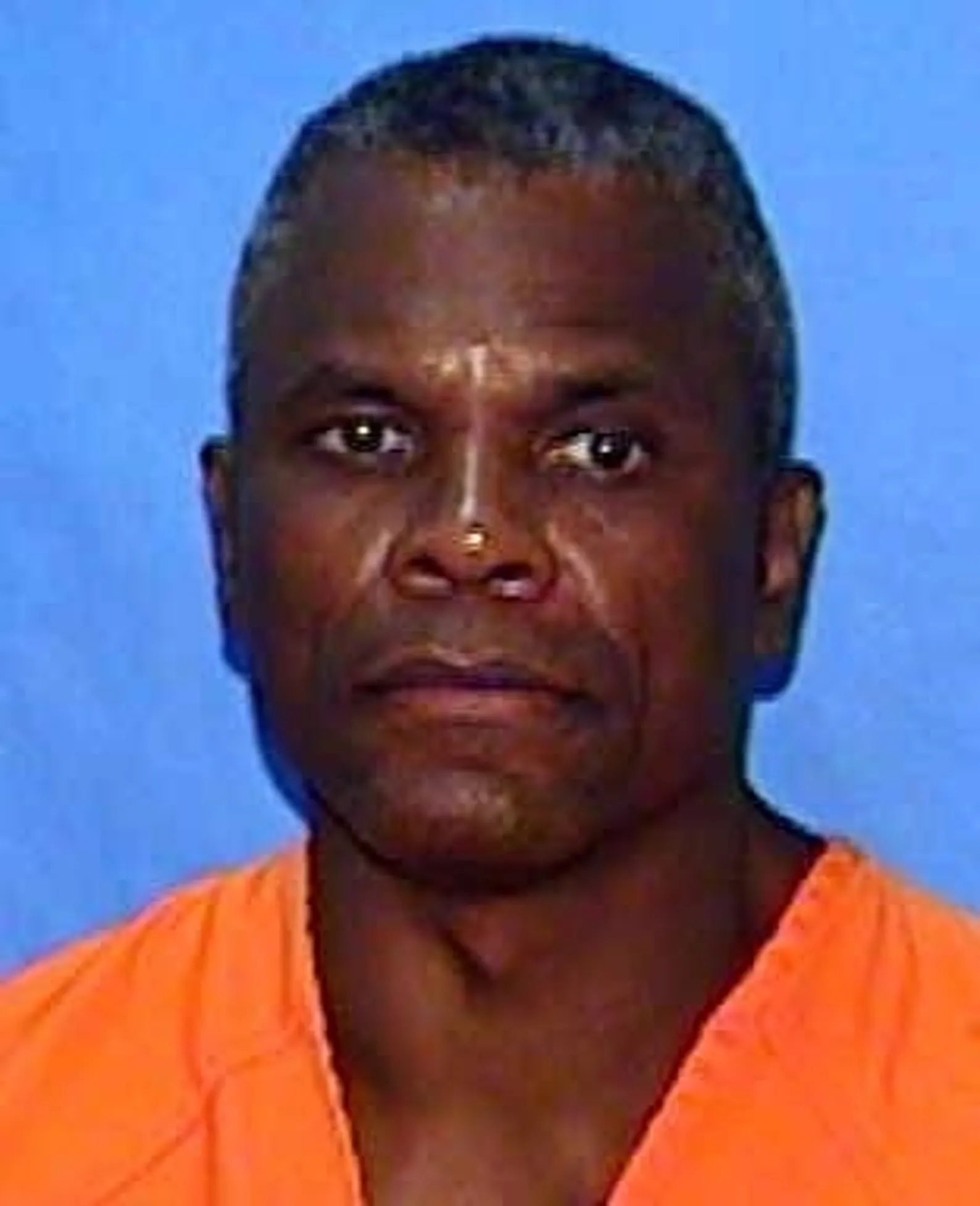
John Errol Ferguson was executed in 2013 for committing the Carol City murders.

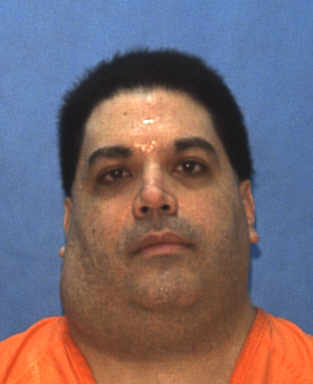
Both the Vatican and Jewish groups asked for Martin Grossman to be spared the death penalty.

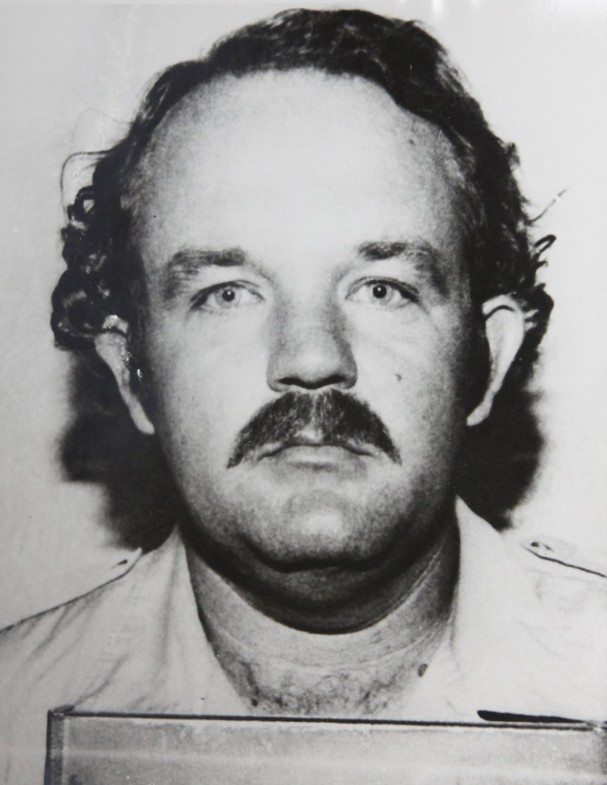
Serial killer David Alan Gore was executed in 2012.

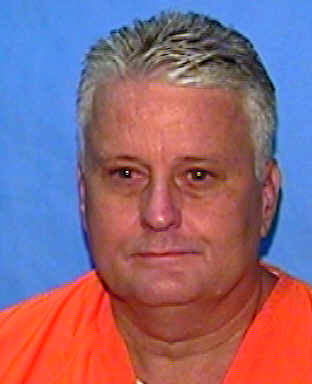
Bobby Joe Long was executed in 2019 for the 1984 murder of Michelle Denise Simms.

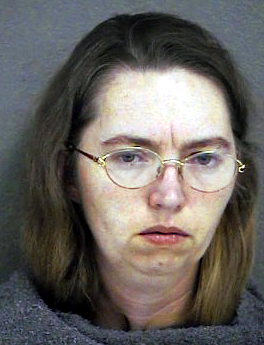
In 2021, Lisa Marie Montgomery became the first female federal prisoner executed in the US in 67 years, and only the fourth overall.

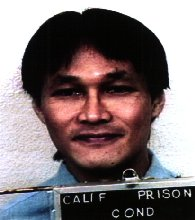
Thai national Jaturun Siripongs was executed in 1999 in California for two murders. He always maintained he was involved in the crime but was not the actual killer.

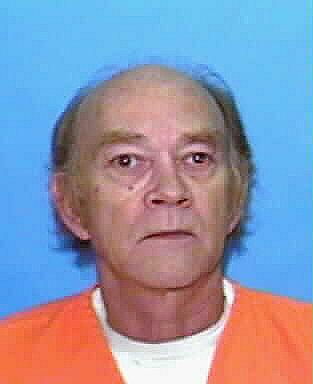
Terry Melvin Sims was the first person executed by lethal injection in the state of Florida.

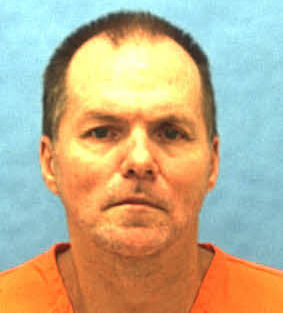
Mark James Asay was the first person executed by lethal injection using the drug etomidate.

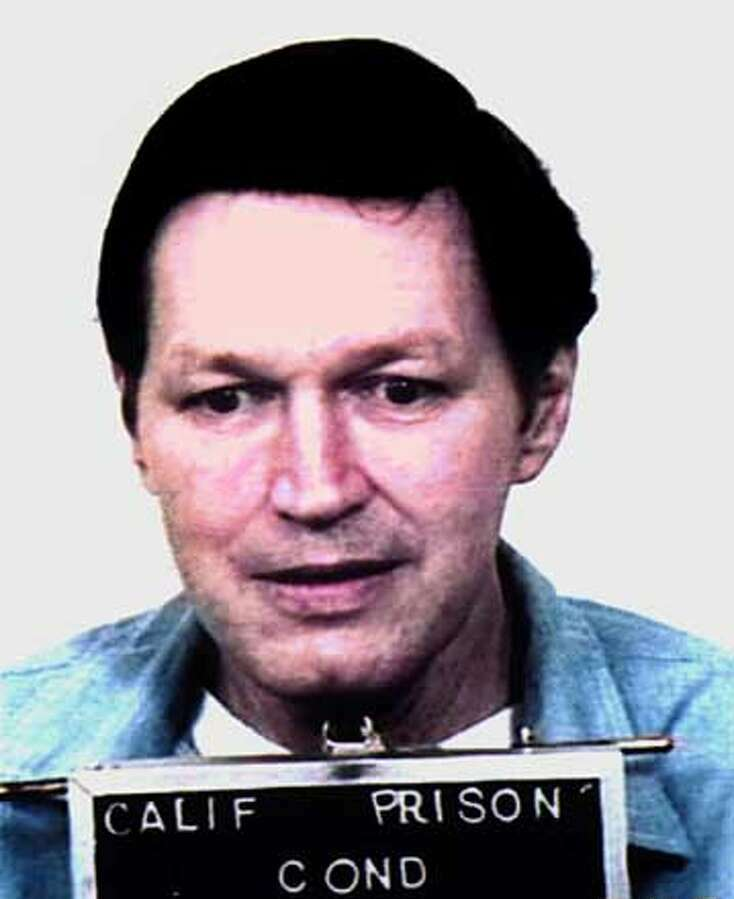
Robert Lee Massie was California's longest-serving death row inmate prior to his execution in 2001.

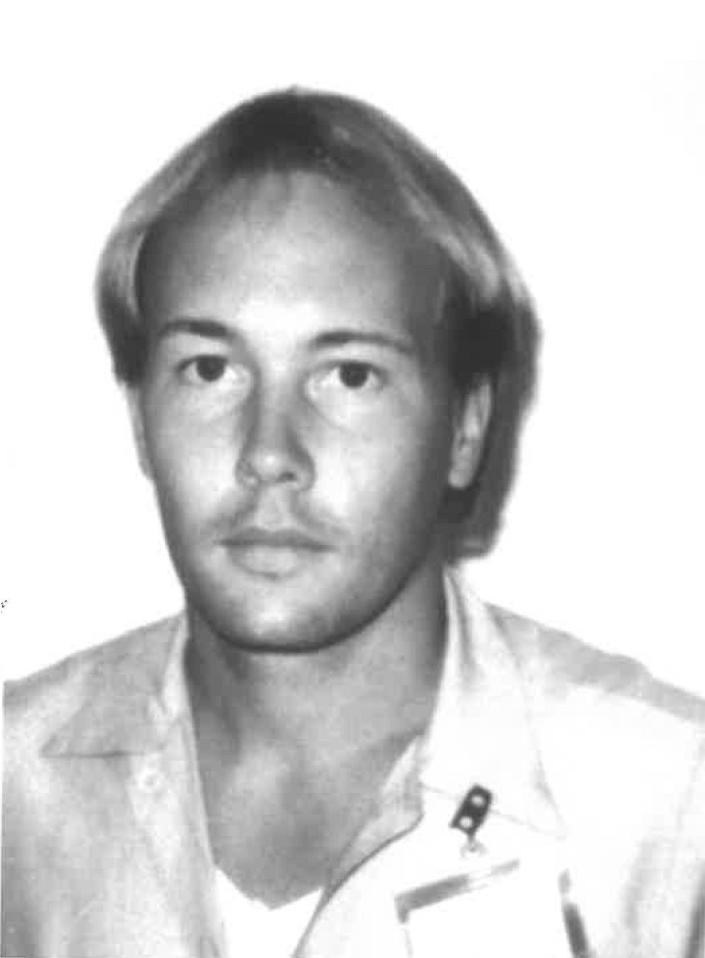
Donald Dillbeck was Florida's 100th execution since the reinstatement of the death penalty.

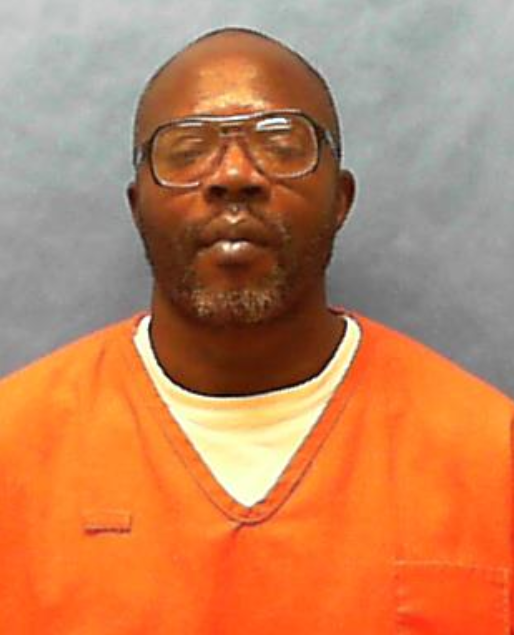
Louis Gaskin was executed in Florida in 2023 for a double murder.

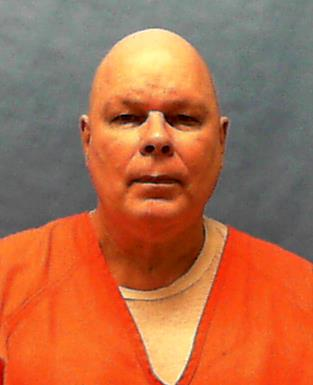
James Barnes was Florida's 60th execution via lethal injection.

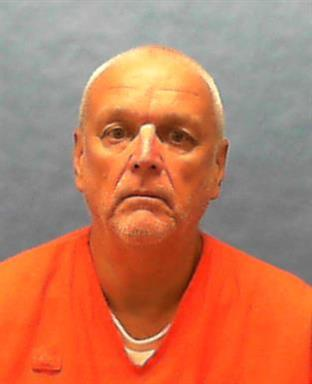
Samuel Lee Smithers was the second white person in Florida to ever be executed for killing a black victim.

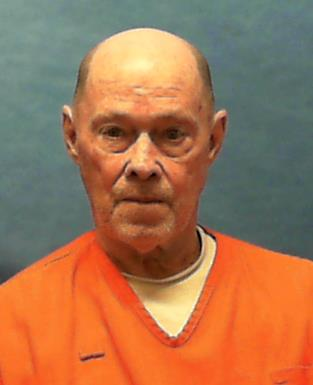
James Hitchcock was executed 50 years after committing murder, and was one of the longest-serving death row prisoners in Florida.

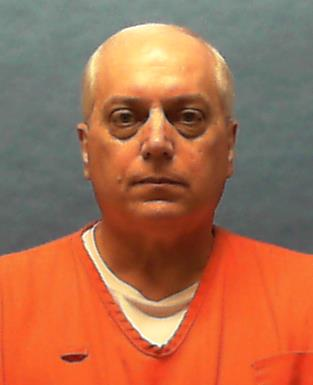
Michael Lee King was executed in 2026 for the murder of Denise Amber Lee.

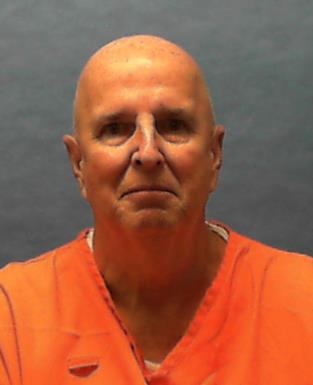
On July 28, 2026, James Aren Duckett (pictured) and Dominick Occhicone were executed, marking the first double execution on the same day in the US since 2017.

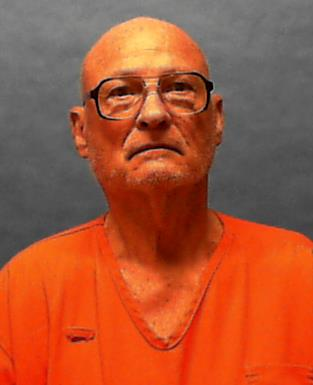
Harold Gene Lucas, who was executed in 2026, had the longest interval between conviction and execution, at over 49 years.

Name	Born	Died	Age	Nationality	Executed in	Executed for	Ref.
Jesús Ledesma Aguilar	1963	2006	42	American	Texas	Murder (2 counts)	
Charles Albanese	1937	1995	58	American	Illinois	Murder (3 counts)	
Jack Alderman	1951	2008	57	American	Georgia (US)	Murder	
Franklin DeWayne Alix	1975	2010	34	American	Texas	Murder	
Clarence Ray Allen	1930	2006	76	American	California	Murder (3 counts)	
Wanda Jean Allen	1959	2001	41	American	Oklahoma	Murder	
Sedler Alley	1956	2006	50	American	Tennessee	Murder	
James Allridge	1962	2004	41	American	Texas	Murder	
Ronald Allridge	1960	1995	34	American	Texas	Murder	
Robert Anderson	1966	2006	40	American	Texas	Murder	
Stephen Wayne Anderson	1953	2002	48	American	California	Murder	
Alojs Andritzki	1914	1943	28	German	Nazi Germany	Making "hostile statements"	
Edgar Tamayo Arias	1967	2014	46	Mexican	Texas	Murder	
John Arnold	1955	1998	43	American	South Carolina	Murder	
Mark James Asay	1964	2017	53	American	Florida	Murder (2 counts)	
Herman Ashworth	1973	2005	32	American	Ohio	Murder	
Frank Jarvis Atwood	1956	2022	66	American	Arizona	Murder	
James Autry	1954	1984	29	American	Texas	Murder (2 counts)	
Manny Babbitt	1949	1999	50	American	California	Murder	
Wesley Baker	1958	2005	47	American	Maryland	Murder	
John Richard Baltazar	1972	2003	30	American	Texas	Murder	
Yuan Baojing	1966	2006	40	Chinese	China	Murder	
Velma Barfield	1932	1984	52	American	North Carolina	Murder	
James Phillip Barnes	1962	2023	61	American	Florida	Murder	
Odell Barnes	1968	2000	31	American	Texas	Murder	
Alex Bartolome	1958	2000	41	Filipino	Philippines	Aggravated rape	
Rocky Barton	1956	2006	49	American	Ohio	Murder	
Suzanne Basso	1954	2014	59	American	Texas	Murder	
John Battaglia	1955	2018	62	American	Texas	Murder (2 counts)	
Donald Beardslee	1943	2005	61	American	California	Murder (2 counts)	
Napoleon Beazley	1976	2002	25	American	Texas	Murder	
Betty Lou Beets	1937	2000	62	American	Texas	Murder	
Rodney Berget	1962	2018	56	American	South Dakota	Murder	
Glenn Lee Benner II	1962	2006	43	American	Ohio	Murder (2 counts)	
Brandon Bernard	1980	2020	40	American	Indiana (Federal)	Murder	
Earl Wesley Berry	1959	2008	49	American	Mississippi	Murder	
Wilford Berry Jr.	1962	1999	36	American	Ohio	Murder	
Danny Bible	1951	2018	66	American	Texas	Murder	
James Bigby	1956	2017	61	American	Texas	Murder (2 counts)	
Kenneth Biros	1958	2009	51	American	Ohio	Murder	
Arthur Gary Bishop	1952	1988	35	American	Utah	Murder (5 counts)	
Byron Lewis Black	1965	2025	69	American	Tennessee	Murder (3 counts)	
Christopher Black Sr.	1959	2003	43	American	Texas	Murder (3 counts)	
Walter Blair Jr.	1960	1993	32	American	Missouri	Murder	
Oscar Ray Bolin Jr.	1962	2016	53	American	Florida	Murder (3 counts)	
William Bonin	1947	1996	49	American	California	Murder (14 counts)	
Gerald James Bordelon	1962	2010	47	American	Louisiana	Murder	
Andrée Borrel	1919	1944	24	French	Nazi-occupied France	Being a Special Operations Executive member	
Alfred Bourgeois	1964	2020	56	American	Indiana (Federal)	Murder	
Marion Bowman Jr.	1980	2025	44	American	South Carolina	Murder	
Lester Leroy Bower Jr.	1947	2015	67	American	Texas	Murder (4 counts)	
Gary Ray Bowles	1962	2019	57	American	Florida	Murder (6 counts)	
Charles Anthony Boyd	1959	1999	39	American	Texas	Murder	
Titus Brandsma	1881	1942	61	Dutch	Nazi Germany	Ordering Catholic newspapers not to print Nazi documents	
Andrew Howard Brannan	1948	2015	49	American	Georgia (US)	Murder	
David M. Brewer	1967	2011	44	American	Ohio	Murder	
Lawrence Russell Brewer	1959	2003	44	American	Ohio	Murder	
Charles Brooks Jr.	1942	1982	40	American	Texas	Murder	
Arthur Brown Jr.	1970	2023	52	American	Texas	Murder (4 counts)	
Cal Coburn Brown	1958	2010	52	American	Washington	Murder	
John A. Brown Jr.	1962	1997	35	American	Louisiana	Murder	
Vernon Brown	1953	2005	51	American	Missouri	Murder	
Russell Earl Bucklew	1968	2019	51	American	Missouri	Murder	
Robert Anthony Buell	1940	2002	62	American	Ohio	Murder	
Robert Earl Butts Jr.	1977	2018	40	American	Georgia (US)	Murder	
Carl Wayne Buntion	1944	2022	78	American	Texas	Murder	
John William Byrd Jr.	1963	2002	38	American	Ohio	Murder	
Alvaro Calambro	1973	1999	25	Filipino	Nevada	Murder (2 counts)	
Genaro Ruiz Camacho	1954	1998	43	American	Texas	Murder	
Ruben Cantu	1966	2003	26	American	Texas	Murder	
Peter Anthony Cantu	1975	2010	35	American	Texas	Murder (2 counts)	
Scott Carpenter	1975	1997	22	American	Oklahoma	Murder	
Desmond Keith Carter	1967	2002	35	American	North Carolina	Murder	
Richard Cartwright	1974	2005	31	American	Texas	Murder	
Edward Castro	1950	2000	50	American	Florida	Murder	
Tomás Cerrate Hernández	c. 1961	2000	39	Guatemalan	Guatemala	Murder	
Amílcar Cetino Pérez	c. 1965	2000	35	Guatemalan	Guatemala	Murder	
Oba Chandler	1946	2011	65	American	Florida	Murder (3 counts)	
Marco Allen Chapman	1971	2008	37	American	Kentucky	Murder (2 counts)	
Juan Carloz Chavez	1968	2014	46	American	Florida	Murder	
Juan Rodriguez Chavez	1968	2003	34	American	Texas	Murder	
Elroy Chester	1969	2013	43	American	Texas	Murder	
James B. Clark Jr.	1957	1996	39	American	Delaware	Murder	
James Lee Clark	1968	2007	38	American	Texas	Murder	
Joseph Lewis Clark	1949	2006	57	American	Ohio	Murder	
Terry D. Clark	1956	2001	45	American	New Mexico	Murder	
Keith Bernard Clay	1968	2003	35	American	Texas	Murder	
Hoyt Franklin Clines	1956	1994	37	American	Arkansas	Murder	
James Allen Coddington	1972	2022	50	American	Oklahoma	Murder	
Robert Glen Coe	1956	2000	44	American	Tennessee	Murder	
Carroll Cole	1938	1985	47	American	Nevada	Murder	
Loran Kenstley Cole	1966	2024	57	American	Florida	Murder	
Alton Coleman	1955	2002	46	American	Ohio	Murder (2 counts)	
Charles Coleman	1947	1990	43	American	Oklahoma	Murder	
Lisa Ann Coleman	1975	2014	38	American	Texas	Murder	
Daniel Conahan	1954	2026	72	American	Florida	Murder	
Robert Dale Conklin	1961	2005	44	American	Georgia (US)	Malice murder	
Richard Cooey	1967	2008	41	American	Ohio	Murder (2 counts)	
Joseph Edward Corcoran	1975	2024	49	American	Indiana	Murder	
Manuel Martínez Coronado	c. 1964	1998	33	Guatemalan	Guatemala	Murder (7 counts)	
David Neal Cox	1970	2021	50	American	Mississippi	Murder	
Charles Ray Crawford	1966	2025	59	American	Mississippi	Murder	
Gary Lee Davis	1944	1997	53	American	Colorado	Murder	
Girvies Davis	1958	1995	37	American	Illinois	Murder (4 counts)	
Troy Davis	1968	2011	42	American	Georgia (US)	Murder	
David Thomas Dawson	1957	2006	48	American	Montana	Murder (3 counts)	
Lü Debin	1953	2005	52	Chinese	China	Murder	
Carlos DeLuna	1962	1989	27	American	Texas	Murder	
James Demouchette	1955	1992	37	American	Texas	Murder	
Adremy Dennis	1976	2004	28	American	Ohio	Murder	
Andrew Grant DeYoung	1974	2011	37	American	Georgia (US)	Murder (2 counts)	
Ángel Nieves Díaz	1951	2006	55	Puerto Rican	Florida	Murder	
Donald Dillbeck	1963	2023	59	American	Florida	Murder	
Jeffrey Dillingham	1973	2000	27	American	Texas	Murder	
Clarence Wayne Dixon	1955	2022	66	American	Arizona	Murder	
Richard Djerf	1969	2025	55	American	Arizona	Murder (four counts)	
Brian Joseph Dorsey	1955	2022	66	American	Missouri	Murder (two counts)	
Leon David Dorsey IV	1972	2024	52	American	Texas	Murder (3 counts)	
James Aren Duckett	1957	2026	68	American	Florida	Murder	
Marion Dudley	1972	2006	33	American	Texas	Murder (4 counts)	
John David Duty	1952	2010	58	American	Oklahoma	Murder	
James Otto Earhart	1943	1999	56	American	Texas	Murder	
Leo Echegaray	1960	1999	38	Filipino	Philippines	Rape of a minor	
James Homer Elledge	1942	2001	58	American	Washington State	Murder	
Licho Escamilla	c. 1982	2015	33	American	Texas	Murder	
Barry Lee Fairchild	1954	1995	41	American	Arkansas	Murder	
Stanley Faulder	1937	1999	61	Canadian	Texas	Murder	
John Joseph Fautenberry	1963	2009	46	American	Ohio	Murder (5 counts)	
John Errol Ferguson	1948	2013	65	American	Florida	Murder (8 counts)	
Samuel Russell Flippen	1969	2006	36	American	North Carolina	Murder	
James Dennis Ford	1960	2025	64	American	Florida	Murder (2 counts)	
Melbert Ford	1960	2010	49	American	Georgia (US)	Murder (2 counts)	
Richard Edwin Fox	1956	2003	47	American	Ohio	Murder	
Joseph Paul Franklin	1950	2013	63	American	Missouri	Murder	
Robert Alan Fratta	1958	2023	65	American	Texas	Murder	
James Garrett Freeman	1980	2016	35	American	Texas	Murder	
John Wayne Gacy	1942	1994	52	American	Illinois	Murder (12 counts)	
Gustavo Julian Garcia	1972	2016	43	American	Texas	Murder	
Humberto Leal Garcia	1973	2011	38	Mexican	Texas	Murder	
Joseph Garcia	1971	2018	47	American	Texas	Murder	
Juan Martin Garcia	1980	2015	35	American	Texas	Murder (2 counts)	
Joseph Gardner	1970	2008	38	American	South Carolina	Murder	
Mark Gardner	c. 1956	1999	42–43	American	Arkansas	Murder (3 counts)	
Johnny Frank Garrett	1963	1992	28	American	Texas	Murder	
Carlton Gary	1950	2018	67	American	Georgia (US)	Murder (3 counts)	
Juan Garza	1956	2001	44	American	Indiana (Federal)	Murder (3 counts)	
Louis Gaskin	1967	2023	56	American	Florida	Murder (2 counts)	
Keith Edmund Gavin	1960	2024	64	American	Alabama	Capital murder	
Michael Carl George	1957	1997	39	American	Virginia	Murder	
Jason Getsy	1975	2009	33	American	Ohio	Murder	
Lewis Eugene Gilbert	1971	2003	31	American	Oklahoma	Murder	
Tyrone Delano Gilliam Jr.	1966	1998	32	American	Maryland	Murder	
Kelly Gissendaner	1968	2015	47	American	Georgia (US)	Murder	
Giuseppe Girotti	1905	1945	39	Italian	Nazi Germany	Aiding Jews	
Robert Dewey Glock	1961	2001	39	American	Florida	Murder	
Ramiro Felix Gonzales	1982	2024	41	American	Texas	Murder	
David Alan Gore	1953	2012	58	American	Florida	Murder (6 counts)	
Marshall Lee Gore	1963	2013	50	American	Florida	Murder (2 counts)	
John Marion Grant	1961	2021	60	American	Oklahoma	Murder	
Kenneth Granviel	1950	1996	45	American	Texas	Murder (7 counts)	
Thomas J. Grasso	1962	1995	32	American	Oklahoma	Murder	
Marlin Gray	1967	2005	38	American	Missouri	Murder (2 counts)	
Ricky Javon Gray	1989	2017	39	American	Virginia	Murder (2 counts)	
Randy Greenawalt	1949	1997	47	American	Arizona	Murder (4 counts)	
Douglas Edward Gretzler	1951	1998	47	American	Arizona	Murder (2 counts)	
Timothy Lane Gribble	1963	2000	36	American	Texas	Murder	
Jeffery Lee Griffin	1955	1992	37	American	Texas	Murder	
Larry Griffin	1954	1995	40	American	Missouri	Murder	
Wendell Grissom	1968	2025	56	American	Missouri	Murder	
Martin Grossman	1965	2010	45	American	Florida	Murder	
Aaron Gunches	1971	2025	45	American	Arizona	Murder	
Scott Hain	1970	2003	32	American	Oklahoma	Murder (2 counts)	
Orlando Hall	1971	2020	49	American	Indiana (Federal)	Murder	
Phillip Dean Hancock	1964	2023	59	American	Oklahoma	Murder (2 counts)	
Terry Hankins	1974	2009	34	American	Texas	Murder (5 counts)	
George John Hanson	1964	2025	61	American	Texas	Murder (2 counts)	
Robert Wayne Harris	1972	2012	40	American	Texas	Murder (5 counts)	
Edward Lee Harper Jr.	1949	1999	50	American	Kentucky	Murder	
Edward Hartman	1964	2003	39	American	North Carolina	Murder	
Samuel Christopher Hawkins	1943	1995	52	American	Texas	Murder	
Larry Allen Hayes	1948	2003	54	American	Texas	Murder (2 counts)	
Gary M. Heidnik	1943	1999	55	American	Pennsylvania	Murder (2 counts)	
John Ruthell Henry	1951	2014	63	American	Florida	Murder (2 counts)	
Richard Henyard	1974	2008	34	American	Florida	Murder (2 counts)	
Ramon Torres Hernandez	1971	2012	41	American	Texas	Murder	
John R. Hicks	1956	2005	49	American	Ohio	Murder	
Dustin John Higgs	1972	2021	48	American	Indiana (Federal)	Murder	
Clarence Hill	1957	2006	48	American	Florida	Murder	
David Mark Hill	1960	2008	48	American	South Carolina	Murder (3 counts)	
Paul Jennings Hill	1954	2003	49	American	Florida	Murder (2 counts)	
Warren Hill	1960	2015	54	American	Georgia (US)	Murder	
James Ernest Hitchcock	1956	2026	70	American	Florida	Murder	
Daniel Hittle	1950	2000	50	American	Texas	Murder	
James William Holmes	1956	1994	37	American	Arkansas	Murder	
Taberon Honie	1975	2024	48	American	Utah	Murder	
Dustin Lee Honken	1968	2020	52	American	Indiana (Federal)	Murder (5 counts)	
John Michael Hooker	1953	2003	49	American	Oklahoma	Murder (2 counts)	
Murray Hooper	1945	2022	76	American	Arizona	Murder (2 counts)	
Mark Hopkinson	1949	1992	42	American	Wyoming	Murder (4 counts)	
David Hosier	1955	2024	69	American	Missouri	Murde	
Tracy Housel	1958	2002	43	British/American	Georgia (US)	Murder	
Ronald Ray Howard	1973	2005	32	American	Texas	Murder	
James Hubbard	1930	2004	74	American	Alabama	Murder	
Shawn Paul Humphries	1971	2005	34	American	South Carolina	Murder	
Flint Gregory Hunt	1959	1997	38	American	Maryland	Murder	
Bert Leroy Hunter	1947	2000	53	American	Missouri	Murder (2 counts)	
James W. Hutchins	1929	1984	54	American	North Carolina	Murder (3 counts)	
Jeffrey Hutchinson	1962	2025	62	American	Florida	Murder (4 counts)	
Phillip Ingle	1961	1995	34	American	North Carolina	Murder (4 counts)	
Billy Ray Irick	1958	2018	59	American	Tennessee	Murder	
Antonio James	1954	1996	42	American	Louisiana	Murder	
Joe Nathan James Jr.	1972	2022	50	American	Alabama	Murder	
Bryan Frederick Jennings	1958	2025	66	American	Florida	Murder	
Desmond Domnique Jennings	1971	1999	28	American	Texas	Murder (2 counts)	
Joseph Paul Jernigan	1954	1993	39	American	Texas	Murder	
Yang Jia	1980	2008	28	Chinese	China	Murder (6 counts)	
Corey Johnson	1968	2021	52	American	Indiana (Federal)	Murder (7 counts)	
David Dewayne Johnson	1963	2000	37	American	Arkansas	Murder	
Ernest Lee Johnson	1960	2021	61	American	Missouri	Murder (3 counts)	
Kevin Johnson Jr.	1985	2022	37	American	Missouri	Murder	
Johnny Allen Johnson	1978	2023	45	American	Missouri	Murder	
Matthew Lee Johnson	1975	2025	49	American	Texas	Murder	
Raymond Eugene Johnson	1974	2026	52	American	Oklahoma	Murder	
Richard Charles Johnson	1963	2002	39	American	South Carolina	Murder	
Shannon M. Johnson	1983	2012	28	American	Delaware	Murder	
Brandon Astor Jones	1943	2016	72	American	Georgia (US)	Murder	
Jack Harold Jones Jr.	1964	2017	52	American	Arkansas	Murder (2 counts)	
Louis Jones Jr.	1950	2003	53	American	Indiana (Federal)	Murder	
Quintin Phillippe Jones	1979	2021	41	American	Texas	Murder	
Richard Gerald Jordan	1946	2025	79	American	Mississippi	Murder	
Xia Junfeng	1972	2009	37	Chinese	China	Murder (2 counts)	
Mir Aimal Kansi	1964	2002	38	Pakistani	Virginia	Murder	
Billy Leon Kearse	1972	2026	53	American	Florida	Murder	
Marvallous Matthew Keene	1973	2009	36	American	Ohio	Murder	
Cheng Kejie	1933	2000	66	Chinese	China	Accepting bribes	
Alvin Andrew Kelly	1951	2008	57	American	Texas	Murder	
Naw Kham	1969	2013	43	Burmese	China	Murder	
John King	1974	2019	44	American	Florida	Murder	
Michael Lee King	1971	2026	54	American	Texas	Murder	
Andrew Kokoraleis	c. 1963	1999	35	American	Illinois	Murder	
Thomas Knight	1951	2014	62	American	Florida	Murder	
Robert Wesley Knighton	1941	2003	62	American	Oklahoma	Murder (2 counts)	
Michał Kozal	1893	1943	49	Polish	Nazi Germany	Refusing to preach in German	
Andrew Lackey	1983	2013	29	American	Alabama	Murder	
Robert Charles Ladd	1957	2015	57	American	Texas	Murder	
Edward Lagrone	1957	2004	46	American	Texas	Murder (3 counts)	
Donnie Cleveland Lance	1953	2020	66	American	Georgia (US)	Murder (2 counts)	
Jeffrey Landrigan	c. 1960	2010	50	American	Arizona	Murder	
Terry Langford	1966	1998	31	American	Montana	Murder (2 counts)	
Anthony LaRette	1951	1995	44	American	Missouri	Murder	
Richard Albert Leavitt	1959	2012	53	American	Idaho	Murder	
William LeCroy Jr.	1970	2020	50	American	Indiana (Federal)	Murder	
Daniel Lewis Lee	1973	2020	47	American	Indiana (Federal)	Murder (3 counts)	
Ledell Lee	1965	2017	51	American	Arkansas	Murder	
Vera Leigh	1903	1944	41	British	Nazi-occupied France	Being a French Resistance fighter	
Teresa Lewis	1969	2010	41	American	Virginia	Murder (2 counts)	
Liu Liankun	1933	1999	66	Chinese	China	Treason	
Stanley Dewaine Lingar	1963	2001	37	American	Missouri	Murder	
Clayton Lockett	1975	2014	38	American	Oklahoma	Murder	
Thomas Edwin Loden Jr.	1964	2022	58	American	Mississippi	Murder	
David Martin	1953	1999	46	American	Texas	Murder (3 counts)	
Bobby Joe Long	1953	2019	65	American	Florida	Murder (8 counts)	
Theerasak Longji	1992	2018	26	Thai	Thailand	Murder	
Richard Longworth	1968	2005	37	American	South Carolina	Murder	
Daniel Anthony Lucas	1978	2016	37	American	Georgia (US)	Murder	
Harold Gene Lucas	1977	2026	75	American	Florida	Murder	
Jeffrey Lundgren	1950	2006	56	American	Ohio	Murder (5 counts)	
William Earl Lynd	1955	2008	53	American	Georgia (US)	Murder	
Robbie Lyons	1972	2003	31	American	North Carolina	Murder	
Daryl Linnie Mack	1958	2006	47	American	Nevada	Murder	
Kelvin Shelby Malone	1961	1999	38	American	Missouri	Murder	
John Marek	1961	2009	47	American	Florida	Murder	
Ernest Martin	1960	2003	42	American	Ohio	Murder	
Leslie Dale Martin	1967	2002	35	American	Louisiana	Murder	
Jason Massey	1973	2001	28	American	Texas	Murder (2 counts)	
Robert Lee Massie	1941	2001	59	American	California	Murder	
Alan Matheney	1950	2005	54	American	Indiana	Murder	
Kimberly McCarthy	1961	2013	52	American	Texas	Murder	
Amber McLaughlin	1973	2023	49	American	Missouri	Murder	
Stephen Albert McCoy	1948	1989	40	American	Texas	Murder	
Kenneth McDuff	1946	1998	52	American	Texas	Murder	
Leroy McGill	1962	2026	63	American	Arizona	Murder	
Dennis B. McGuire	1960	2014	53	American	Ohio	Murder	
Steven Van McHone	1970	2005	35	American	North Carolina	Murder (2 counts)	
Duncan McKenzie	1951	1995	43	American	Montana	Murder	
Timothy McVeigh	1968	2001	33	American	Indiana (Federal)	11 federal charges, including 8 counts of murder	
José Medellín	1975	2008	33	Mexican	Texas	Murder (2 counts)	
Robert Melson	1971	2017	46	American	Alabama	Murder (3 counts)	
Moises Sandoval Mendoza	1984	2025	41	American	Texas	Murder	
George Mercer	1944	1989	44	American	Missouri	Murder	
Blaine Milam	1989	2025	35	American	Texas	Murder	
Jamie Ray Mills	1974	2024	50	American	Alabama	Murder (two counts)	
Lezmond Charles Mitchell	1981	2020	38	Native American	Indiana (Federal)	Murder	
Harry Mitts Jr.	1952	2013	61	American	Ohio	Aggravated murder (two counts)	
Stephen Anthony Mobley	1965	2005	39	American	Georgia (US)	Murder	
Donald Eugene Moeller	1952	2012	60	American	South Dakota	Murder	
Lisa Marie Montgomery	1968	2021	52	American	Indiana (Federal)	Murder	
Walter Moody	1935	2018	83	American	Alabama	Murder	
Carey Dean Moore	1957	2018	60	American	Nebraska	Murder	
Richard Bernard Moore	1965	2024	59	American	South Carolina	Murder	
Harry Charles Moore	1941	1997	56	American	Oregon	Murder (2 counts)	
Eliseo Moreno	1959	1987	27	American	Texas	Murder	
Stephen Morin	1951	1985	34	American	Texas	Murder (3 counts)	
William Morva	1982	2017	35	American	Virginia	Murder (2 counts)	
Leon Moser	1942	1995	52	American	Pennsylvania	Murder (3 counts)	
John Allen Muhammad	1960	2009	48	American	Virginia	Murder	
Dawud M. Mu'Min	1953	1997	44	American	Virginia	Murder	
Eric Nance	1960	2005	45	American	Arkansas	Murder	
Jay Wesley Neill	1965	2002	37	American	Oklahoma	Murder (4 counts)	
Keith Dwayne Nelson	1974	2020	45	American	Indiana (Federal)	Murder	
Steven Lawayne Nelson	1987	2025	45	American	Texas	Murder	
Eric Nenno	1961	2007	47	American	Texas	Murder (4 counts)	
Donald Newbury	1963	2015	52	American	Texas	Murder	
Christopher Newton	1969	2007	40	American	Texas	Murder (3 counts)	
Frances Newton	1965	2005	37	American	Ohio	Murder	
Harold Wayne Nichols	1960	2025	64	American	Tennessee	Murder	
John B. Nixon	1928	2005	77	American	Mississippi	Murder	
Riley Dobi Noel	1972	2003	31	American	Arkansas	Murder (3 counts)	
Roderick Nunley	1965	2015	50	American	Missouri	Murder	
Derrick O'Brien	1975	2006	31	American	Texas	Murder (2 counts)	
Ronald Clark O'Bryan	1945	1984	39	American	Texas	Murder	
Dominick Occhicone	1944	2026	80	American	Florida	Murder (2 counts)	
Robert Earl O'Neal	1961	1995	34	American	Missouri	Murder	
Steven Oken	1962	2004	42	American	Maryland	Murder (2 counts)	
Sonya Olschanezky	1923	1944	20	German	Nazi-occupied France	Being a Special Operations Executive member	
Curtis Osborne	1970	2008	37	American	Georgia (US)	Murder	
Gary Otte	1971	2017	45	American	Ohio	Murder (2 counts)	
Duane Owen	1961	2023	62	American	Florida	Murder (2 counts)	
Freddie Eugene Owens	1978	2024	46	American	South Carolina	Murder	
Elijah Page	1981	2007	25	American	South Dakota	Murder	
Manuel Pardo Jr.	1956	2012	56	American	Florida	Murder (8 counts)	
Joseph Mitchell Parsons	1964	1999	35	American	Utah	Murder	
James Emery Paster	1945	1989	44	American	Texas	Murder	
Kelsey Patterson	1954	2004	50	American	Texas	Murder (2 counts)	
Steven Brian Pennell	1957	1992	34	American	Delaware	Murder (2 counts)	
Reginald Perkins	1955	2009	53	American	Texas	Murder	
Michael James Perry	1982	2010	28	American	Texas	Murder (3 counts)	
Ronald Phillips	1973	2017	43	American	Ohio	Murder	
John Plath	1954	1998	43	American	South Carolina	Murder	
Michael Kent Poland	1940	1999	49	American	Arizona	Murder (2 counts)	
Patrick Gene Poland	1950	2000	49	American	Arizona	Murder (2 counts)	
Gilbert Ray Postelle	1986	2022	35	American	Oklahoma	Murder (4 counts)	
Alfredo Rolando Prieto	1965	2015	49	Salvadoran	Virginia	Murder	
Thomas Harrison Provenzano	1949	2000	51	American	Florida	Murder	
Marion Albert Pruett	1949	1999	49	American	Arkansas	Murder	
Robert Lynn Pruett	1979	2017	38	American	Texas	Murder	
Wesley Ira Purkey	1952	2020	68	American	Indiana (Federal)	Murder	
Willie James Pye	1965	2024	59	American	Georgia (US)	Murder	
Wen Qiang	1956	2010	54	Chinese	China	Accepting bribes, rape	
John Henry Ramirez	1963	2005	42	American	Texas	Murder	
Luis L. Ramirez	1984	2022	38	American	Texas	Murder	
Domineque Ray	1977	2019	42	American	Alabama	Murder	
Ricky Ray Rector	1950	1992	42	American	Arkansas	Murder	
James Allen Red Dog	1954	1993	39	American	Delaware	Murder	
Matthew Reeves	1977	2022	44	American	Alabama	Murder	
David Santiago Renteria	1970	2023	53	American	Texas	Murder	
Ángel Maturino Reséndiz	1960	2006	45	Mexican	Texas	Murder	
Charles Russell Rhines	1956	2019	63	American	South Dakota	Murder	
Brandon Joseph Rhode	1979	2010	31	American	Georgia (US)	Murder	
Paul Ezra Rhoades	1957	2011	54	American	Idaho	Murder (3 counts)	
Darrell Keith Rich	1955	2000	45	American	California	Murder (4 counts)	
Michael Wayne Richard	1959	2007	47	American	Texas	Murder	
Darryl Richley	1951	1994	43	American	Arkansas	Murder	
Earl Richmond	1961	2005	43	American	North Carolina	Murder (3 counts)	
Christina Marie Riggs	1971	2000	28	American	Arkansas	Murder (2 counts)	
Benjamin Ritchie	1980	2025	45	American	Indiana	Murder	
George Rivas	1981	2012	41	Mexican	Texas	Murder	
Roy Michael Roberts	1952	1999	46	American	Missouri	Murder	
Johnny Leartice Robinson	1952	2004	51	American	Florida	Murder	
David Rocheville	1968	1999	31	American	South Carolina	Murder	
Richard Norman Rojem Jr.	1957	2024	66	American	Oklahoma	Murder	
Michael Rodriguez	1963	2008	45	American	Texas	Murder	
Rosendo Rodriguez	1980	2018	38	American	Texas	Murder (2 counts)	
Glen Edward Rogers	1962	2025	62	American	Florida	Murder (2 counts)	
Danny Rolling	1954	2006	52	American	Florida	Murder (5 counts)	
Lao Rongzhi	1974	2023	38	Chinese	China	Murder (7 counts)	
Michael Bruce Ross	1959	2005	45	American	Connecticut	Murder (8 counts)	
Vaughn Ross	1971	2013	41	American	Texas	Murder (2 counts)	
Diana Rowden	1915	1944	29	British	Nazi-occupied France	Being a Special Operations Executive member	
Robert Dale Rowell	1955	2005	50	American	Texas	Murder	
Cheng Ruilong	1973	2010	37	Chinese	China	Murder (11 counts)	
Jeremy Vargas Sagastegui	1970	1998	27	American	Washington State	Murder (3 counts)	
Anthony Castillo Sanchez	1978	2023	45	American	Oklahoma	Murder	
Shaka Sankofa	1963	2000	36	American	Texas	Murder	
Robert Sawyer	c. 1951	1993	42	American	Louisiana	Murder	
Mark Dean Schwab	1968	2008	39	American	Florida	Murder	
Jay D. Scott	1952	2001	48	American	Ohio	Murder	
Sean Sellers	1969	1999	29	American	Oklahoma	Murder (3 counts)	
Tommy Lynn Sells	1964	2014	49	American	Texas	Murder	
Akmal Shaikh	1956	2009	53	British	China	Drug trafficking	
Michael Eugene Sharp	1954	1997	43	American	Texas	Murder	
Lance Collin Shockley	1977	2025	48	American	Missouri	Murder	
Anthony Allen Shore	1962	2018	55	American	Texas	Murder	
Ronald Gene Simmons	1940	1990	49	American	Arkansas	Murder (16 counts)	
Terry Melvin Sims	1942	2000	58	American	Florida	Murder	
Charles Laverne Singleton	1959	2004	44	American	Arkansas	Murder	
Jaturun Siripongs	1951	1999	47	Thai	California	Murder (2 counts)	
Andrew Six	1965	1997	32	American	Missouri	Murder	
Dennis Skillicorn	1959	2009	49	American	Missouri	Murder	
Andrew Lavern Smith	1960	1998	38	American	South Carolina	Murder (2 counts)	
Michael Dewayne Smith	1982	2024	41	American	Oklahoma	Murder (2 counts)	
Clay King Smith	1970	2001	30	American	Arkansas	Murder (5 counts)	
James Edward Smith	1952	1990	37	American	Texas	Murder	
Oscar Franklin Smith	1950	2025	75	American	Tennessee	Murder (3 counts)	
Kermit Smith Jr.	1957	1995	37	American	North Carolina	Murder	
William Smith	1957	2005	47	American	Ohio	Murder	
Samuel Lee Smithers	1953	2025	72	American	Florida	Murder (2 counts)	
Richard Snell	1951	2011	59	American	Oklahoma	Murder (3 counts)	
Dusty Ray Spencer	1952	2026	74	American	Florida	Murder	
Frank Spisak	1930	1995	64	American	Arkansas	Murder	
Roger Dale Stafford	1951	1995	43	American	Oklahoma	Murder (9 counts)	
Stephen Stanko	1968	2025	57	American	South Carolina	Murder (2 counts)	
Brian Steckel	1968	2005	36	American	Delaware	Murder	
Raymond Lee Stewart	1952	1996	44	American	Illinois	Murder (3 counts)	
Winford LaVern Stokes Jr.	1951	1990	39	American	Missouri	Murder	
Bigler Stouffer	1942	2021	79	American	Oklahoma	Murder	
Tommy David Strickler	1965	1999	33	American	Virginia	Murder	
Mark Anthony Stroman	1969	2011	41	American	Texas	Murder	
Elias Syriani	1938	2005	67	American	North Carolina	Murder	
Richard Lee Tabler	1979	2025	46	American	Texas	Murder	
Feltus Taylor	1962	2000	38	American	Louisiana	Murder	
Michael Anthony Taylor	1967	2014	47	American	Missouri	Murder	
Michael Anthony Tanzi	1977	2025	48	American	Florida	Murder	
Steven Ray Thacker	1970	2013	42	American	Oklahoma	Murder	
John Thanos	1949	1994	45	American	Maryland	Murder (3 counts)	
Shannon Charles Thomas	1971	2005	34	American	Texas	Murder (3 counts)	
Thomas Martin Thompson	1955	1998	43	American	California	Murder	
William Paul Thompson	1938	1989	51	American	Nevada	Murder	
Charles Victor Thompson	1970	2026	55	American	Texas	Murder (two counts)	
Michael Torrence	1961	1996	35	American	South Carolina	Murder	
Kevin Ray Underwood	1979	2024	45	American	Oklahoma	Murder	
Karla Faye Tucker	1959	1998	38	American	Texas	Murder (2 counts)	
Robert Van Hook	1960	2018	58	American	Ohio	Murder	
Pablo Lucio Vasquez	1977	2016	38	American	Texas	Murder	
Christopher Andre Vialva	1980	2020	40	American	Indiana (Federal)	Murder	
Anthony Wainwright	1970	2025	54	American	Florida	Murder	
Charles Walker	1940	1990	50	American	Illinois	Murder (2 counts)	
Frank A. Walls	1967	2025	58	American	Florida	Murder (3 counts)	
Adam Kelly Ward	1982	2016	33	American	Texas	Murder	
Roy Lee Ward	1972	2025	53	American	Indiana	Murder	
Thomas Lee Ward	1936	1995	59	American	Louisiana	Murder	
Liu Wei	1969	2015	45	Chinese	China	Murder	
Keith Wells	1962	1994	31	American	Idaho	Murder (2 counts)	
Coy Wayne Wesbrook	1958	2016	58	American	Texas	Murder (5 counts)	
Thomas Warren Whisenhant	1947	2010	63	American	Alabama	Murder	
Garcia Glen White	1963	2024	61	American	Texas	Murder (3 counts)	
William Dean Wickline Jr.	1952	2004	52	American	Ohio	Murder (2 counts)	
Ponchai Wilkerson	1971	2000	28	American	Texas	Murder	
Christopher Chubasco Wilkins	1968	2017	48	American	Texas	Murder (2 counts)	
Alan Willett	1947	1999	52	American	Arkansas	Murder	
Dobie Gillis Williams	1961	1999	37	American	Louisiana	Murder	
Jeremy Tremaine Williams	1984	2026	42	American	Alabama	Murder	
Keith Daniel Williams	1947	1996	48	American	California	Murder (3 counts)	
Kenneth Dewayne Williams	1979	2017	38	American	Arkansas	Murder	
Marcel Wayne Williams	1970	2017	46	American	Arkansas	Murder	
Marcellus Williams	1968	2024	55	American	Missouri	Murder	
Stanley Williams	1953	2005	51	American	California	Murder (4 counts)	
Willie Williams	1956	2006	48	American	Ohio	Murder (4 counts)	
Cameron Todd Willingham	1968	2004	36	American	Texas	Murder (3 counts)	
Marion Wilson Jr.	1976	2019	42	American	Georgia (US)	Murder	
Marvin Lee Wilson	1958	2012	54	American	Texas	Murder	
Hastings Arthur Wise	1954	2005	51	American	South Carolina	Murder (4 counts)	
Joseph Wood	1958	2014	55	American	Arizona	Murder (2 counts)	
Bobby Wayne Woods	1965	2009	44	American	Texas	Murder	
Nathaniel Woods	1976	2020	43	American	Alabama	Murder	
Stephen Michael Woods	1980	2011	31	American	Texas	Murder (2 counts)	
Philip Workman	1953	2007	53	American	Tennessee	Murder	
Douglas Franklin Wright	1940	1996	56	American	Oregon	Murder (3 counts)	
Matthew Eric Wrinkles	1960	2009	49	American	Indiana	Murder (3 counts)	
Aileen Wuornos	1956	2002	46	American	Florida	Murder (7 counts)	
Zheng Xiaoyu	1944	2007	62	Chinese	China	Corruption	
Wu Xieyu	1994	2024	29	Chinese	China	Murder	
Michael Duane Zack III	1968	2023	54	American	Florida	Murder	
Edward James Zakrzewski II	1965	2025	60	American	Florida	Murder (3 counts)	
Keith Zettlemoyer	1955	1995	39	American	Pennsylvania	Murder	
William G. Zuern Jr.	1958	2004	45	American	Ohio	Murder	

== See also ==
- Lists of people executed by methods other than lethal injection
- Lists of people executed in the United States (1900–1972)
- Lists of people executed in the United States since 1976
- Lists of people by cause of death
