= Bernard Bolender =

American mass murderer (1952–1995)

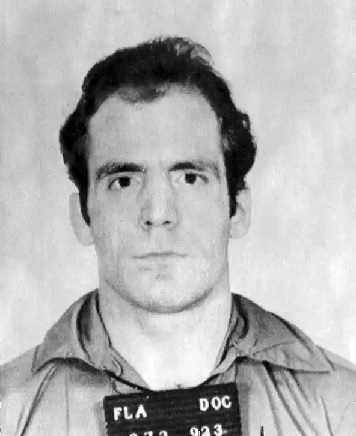
- Bolender's mugshot
- Born: September 1, 1952; United States
- Died: July 18, 1995 (aged 42); Florida State Prison, Florida, U.S.
- Spouse: Joyce Bolender
- Status: Executed by electrocution
- Conviction: First degree murder (4 counts)
- Penalty: Death

Details
- Victims: 4
- Date: January 8, 1980
- Country: United States
- State: Florida

Bernard Bolender (September 1, 1952 – July 18, 1995) was an American mass murderer who killed four people during a drug deal in Florida. He was executed by electric chair at Florida State Prison in 1995.

== Early life ==
Bolender attended high school in West Babylon, New York. After owning a nightclub and restaurant in the 1970s, Bolender separated from his wife and children and became involved in the Miami cocaine scene. He became rich very quickly, reportedly hiring a chauffeured limousine to drive his monkey around.

== Murders ==
In 1980, Bolender murdered four men after a botched drug deal. Bolender and two others, Joseph Macker and Paul Thompson, kidnapped the four victims and then robbed, tortured, and murdered them. The bodies were hidden in a burnt car which was later found on Interstate 95 in Miami, Florida. The victims were John Merino, Scott Bennett, Rudolfo Ayan, and Nicomedes Hernandez, who were all killed on January 8, 1980.

Bolender, Macker, and Thompson were instant suspects. Macker made a deal with prosecutors for leniency in exchange for his testimony that Bolender was the instigator of the murders. Bolender's fingerprints were found on the burnt car. Despite this, he maintained his innocence and claimed he was not involved in the murders. Bolender stated that he was at home with his girlfriend during the killings.

== Trial and execution ==
Bolender was convicted of the murders and sentenced to death in April 1980, just three months after the crime. The jury had unanimously recommended a life sentence, but Judge Richard S. Fuller overrode them and sentenced Bolender to death. Bolender's case was then appealed to the Supreme Court of Florida, which affirmed his sentence in 1983. A judge threw out his death sentence, ruling that Bolender's lawyer was ineffective as he presented no evidence in Bolender's favor during the penalty phase of his trial. That ruling was reversed and the death penalty reinstated in 1987. Bolender then had another appeal for the United States District Court for the Southern District of Florida in 1990.

Bolender was executed in the electric chair on July 18, 1995, at the Florida State Prison in Bradford County, Florida. He was pronounced dead at 10:19 am.

== See also ==
- Capital punishment in Florida
- Capital punishment in the United States
- List of people executed in Florida
- List of people executed in the United States in 1995
