= Phillip Ingle =

American serial killer

- NCDOC mugshot
- Born: Phillip Lee Ingle; August 7, 1961; Lincoln County, North Carolina. U.S.
- Died: September 22, 1995 (aged 34); Central Prison, North Carolina, U.S.
- Children: 2
- Status: Executed by lethal injection
- Convictions: first-degree murder (4 counts); first-degree burglary; Breaking and entering; Assault
- Penalty: Death

Details
- Victims: 4
- Span of crimes: July – September 1991
- Country: United States
- State: North Carolina
- Weapons: Axe handle; Tire iron

Phillip Lee Ingle (August 7, 1961 – September 22, 1995) was an American serial killer who killed two married couples in Cherryville, North Carolina, in 1991. He knew one pair of victims and later confessed to a friend that he enjoyed watching people die in agony. Convicted of four counts of first-degree murder and one count of first-degree burglary, he was sentenced to death. He later waived his appeals, saying that he wanted to spare the victims' families further pain, and was executed in 1995.

== Early life ==
Ingle was born on August 7, 1961, in Lincoln County, North Carolina. According to family friends, his parents separated soon after he was born, and his mother was only intermittently present in his life. Family members also said that he was sexually abused by a cousin during childhood. He reportedly attempted suicide at the age of five or six. In the early 1980s, Ingle served time in jail for breaking and entering and assault. At age 18, he shot himself in the stomach. In December 1986, while intoxicated, Ingle was admitted to Broughton Hospital. He was released five days later and referred to Black Mountain's 28-day treatment program. He also received psychiatric treatment several times in the late 1980s.

== Murders ==
In July 1991, Ingle entered the home of William Fred Davis, 68, and Margaret Davis, 67. The door was unlocked, and he entered armed with an axe handle he had taken from his car. Margaret was in the kitchen, and Ingle, who knew the couple, beat her to death. He then attacked William, who was in the den watching television, and beat him to death.

Two weeks after the first killings, Ingle attempted to admit himself to a state mental hospital after he was found intoxicated and threatening suicide. He attributed his condition to alcohol use and was released to the care of his brother-in-law. Doctors advised him to seek treatment for alcoholism in a private facility. William Rafter, director of Black Mountain's treatment program, said the case illustrated challenges in treating individuals with both mental illness and substance use disorders.

Before Ingle's arrest, the Davises' 29-year-old son-in-law, Joey James Melton, was considered a suspect but was not arrested. Melton had a strained relationship with the victims, and investigators questioned him multiple times. According to reports, he had previously received psychiatric treatment and had a history of substance use. Authorities did not find evidence linking him to the killings, and suspicion toward him later declined.

A friend, Floyd Terry, said investigators repeatedly questioned Melton, stating, "They were all over the place, and all over him. I asked him straight out right after it happened. He said, 'I couldn't do nothing like that, I couldn't. And if I did, I wouldn't be crazy enough to let my wife go back there the next day.'" However, as time passed and police found no evidence linking Melton to the murders, the pressure on him seemed to ease.

In August 1991, Ingle entered the home of E.Z. Willis, 70, and Sarah Willis, 67, through an unlatched window, and beat them to death with a tire iron. E.Z. fought back with his cane, striking Ingle several times and giving him a black eye and a gash on his face. His injuries were severe enough that he missed work afterward.

After the second pair of murders were discovered by the couple's daughter on September 9, Melton became a suspect once more, and investigators questioned him again. The next day, he committed suicide. Melton's wife refused to reveal the contents of his suicide note.

Ingle later said he believed his four victims were "demons with red eyes, horns and tails", and said he was doing God's work by killing them. Before his arrest, Ingle told a friend that he enjoyed watching people die in agony.

== Trial and execution ==
Although a counselor believed that Ingle had a mental illness, he was found competent to stand trial. He pleaded not guilty by reason of insanity but was convicted on one count of first-degree burglary and four counts of first-degree murder. During the trial, prosecutors presented evidence that the murders were planned, and several doctors testified that he did not meet the legal standard for insanity at the time of the murders. The jury returned a death sentence for Ingle. He waived his appeals, stating that he wanted the victims' families to have peace.

Ingle's sister later filed an appeal on his behalf, arguing that he was not competent to waive his appeals. The North Carolina Supreme Court found that, although Ingle had mental health issues, there was no evidence that he was legally insane and that he was competent to waive his appeals. In a videotape, Ingle said the only alternative to execution he was willing to accept was lifetime commitment to a psychiatric hospital, which would have been the outcome if he had been found not guilty by reason of insanity.

At a court hearing, Ingle apologized to the victims' families and said he thought about them daily. He also stated that he did not remember committing the murders but accepted responsibility for them.

Ingle was executed by lethal injection on September 22, 1995. His last meal consisted of a medium-rare steak, a baked potato, a tossed salad, and butter pecan ice cream. He spent his final hours with his wife, their two daughters, and his mother. As he was taken into the execution chamber, he said, "I'm going to heaven!"

When asked for his final statement, Ingle said he opposed capital punishment but had chosen to end his appeals so the victims' families could find peace. He also expressed gratitude to supporters and stated that he had repented and no longer feared death.

He requested that his body be cremated and his ashes scattered in South Mountain State Park in Burke County, North Carolina.

== See also ==
- List of people executed by lethal injection
- List of people executed in North Carolina
- List of people executed in the United States in 1995
- List of serial killers in the United States
- Volunteer (capital punishment)

Executions carried out in North Carolina
Preceded by Kermit Smith Jr. January 24, 1995	Phillip Ingle; September 22, 1995	Succeeded by Ricky Lee Sanderson January 30, 1998
Executions carried out in the United States
Preceded by Charles Albanese – Illinois September 20, 1995	Phillip Ingle – North Carolina; September 22, 1995	Succeeded by Dennis Stockton – Virginia September 27, 1995
