= Ronald and James Allridge =

Executed American serial killers

Ronald Allridge
- Born: Ronald Keith Allridge; September 27, 1960; Stuttgart, West Germany
- Died: June 8, 1995 (aged 34); Huntsville Unit, Texas, U.S.
- Status: Executed by lethal injection
- Motive: Robbery
- Convictions: Murder (1977); Capital murder (1986)
- Penalty: 10 years' imprisonment (1977); Death (1986)

Details
- Victims: 4 (accomplice in 1)
- Span of crimes: April 12, 1976 – March 25, 1985
- Country: United States
- State: Texas

James Allridge
- Born: James Vernon Allridge III; November 14, 1962; Colorado Springs, Colorado, U.S.
- Died: August 26, 2004 (aged 41); Huntsville Unit, Texas, U.S.
- Status: Executed by lethal injection
- Motive: Robbery
- Conviction: Capital murder
- Penalty: Death

Details
- Victims: 2 (accomplice in 1)
- Span of crimes: February 4 – March 25, 1985
- Country: United States
- State: Texas

Ronald Keith Allridge (September 27, 1960 – June 8, 1995) and James Vernon Allridge III (November 14, 1962 – August 26, 2004) were American brothers and serial killers who killed three people and committed numerous armed robberies in Fort Worth, Texas, during a crime spree in early 1985. For their crimes, the Allridge brothers were sentenced to death and subsequently executed by lethal injection; Ronald in 1995 and James in 2004.

== Early life ==
Ronald Allridge was born on September 27, 1960, in Stuttgart, West Germany, where his father was stationed at the time as part of the military. Two years later, on November 14, 1962, his younger brother James was born in Colorado Springs, Colorado. In 1969, the family settled in Fort Worth, Texas, moving into a home at 2425 Annglen Drive where Ronald and James shared an attic bedroom.

Ronald was described by his gym teacher at O. D. Wyatt High School as shy and quiet. James, on the other hand, was described as outgoing and was popular among students at his high school.

== Crimes ==
=== 1976 murder ===
In March 1976, 15-year-old Ronald robbed a local department store; he stole several watches and three guns with multiple boxes of ammunition. Afterwards, he began regularly bringing one of the guns to his high school, which he showed off to fellow students and told them he was ready to shoot someone. On April 12, 1976, Ronald brought the gun to school and, once surrounded by an audience of students outside the boys' restroom, fatally shot 15-year-old Lorenzo Kneeland in the chest and abdomen. Another student, 15-year-old James Christian, was also shot, but he survived. The motive was reportedly unclear, although Lorenzo and Ronald had fought in the past over either a girl or a burglary dispute.

Ronald was apprehended by police while walking along Old Mansfield Highway, still in possession of the gun. While in custody, a psychologist diagnosed him with paranoid schizophrenia. In 1977 he pleaded guilty to the crime, receiving a sentence of 10 years' imprisonment at the Texas Department of Corrections Ferguson Unit. In 1983 he was released from prison with no parole to be required, after which he got a job at a restaurant, but from which he was fired in late 1984 after his boss got tired of him showing up late.

=== 1985 crime spree ===
In the months following his firing, Ronald and his brother James committed a series of armed robberies in and around Fort Worth. In some of these robberies they were aided by another pair of brothers, Clarence and Milton Jarmon. These robberies would be mentioned in the sentencing phases for Ronald and James.

On January 14, 1985, Ronald committed an armed robbery at a Crusty's Pizza shop in Fort Worth. During the robbery, he fatally shot 19-year-old Buddy Joe Webster Jr., an employee present, with a .22-caliber pistol. Ronald later stated that after the murder, he simply went home and went to sleep as if nothing had happened.

On February 3, 1985, the Allridge brothers drove to a convenience store in Fort Worth. James, a former employee there, knew where the combination to the store's safe was kept. Ronald dropped James off and parked around the corner to wait. The store was closed, but a clerk, 21-year-old Brian Clendennen, was there. James asked Clendennen for change so he could make a payphone call. Clendennen recognized James, unlocked the doors for him, and gave him some change. After James pretended to use the payphone and left, Clendennen re-locked the doors.

After James returned to the car, Ronald accused him of getting cold feet, prompting him to go back to the store. After Clendennen re-opened the doors, James produced a .25-caliber pistol at him and forced his way inside. He took Clendennen into the storeroom and tied his hands behind his back with an electrical cord. As he was emptying the cash register and safe, James heard a noise from the storeroom, prompting him to go back, where he saw that Clendennen had moved. He then forced him to his knees and shot him twice in the back of the head.

After returning to the car, James decided to check if Clendennen was dead. However, he saw a woman in the store's parking lot and decided to flee. The woman was Doris Clendennen, Brian's mother, who had come to pick her son up from work. After James fled, she went inside the store, saw loose change on the floor, and immediately left to call the police from a nearby restaurant. The police found Brian in the storeroom, still alive, but he died from his injuries the following day.

On March 25, 1985, Ronald and James, along with Clarence and Milton Jarmon, committed a violent armed robbery at a Whataburger restaurant in Fort Worth. Ronald was armed with a shotgun, and two others had pistols. One of them shot out the glass door on the east side of the restaurant with his pistol, and stayed at the restaurant's west door for the rest of the robbery. Milton leaped over a counter to ransack two cash registers, knocking one of them over in the process. As he went over the counter, he accidentally dropped his pistol, which discharged. After the employees gave him the money, he went back over the counter and fled the restaurant with the others.

At the same time, while she was eating with her friends, 19-year-old Carla McMillen Otto was approached by Ronald. Ronald threw a bag at Otto and told her, "Fill it up, bitch." The bag fell to the ground and when Otto raised her hands in surrender, Ronald fatally shot her in the chest. Ronald then ordered Cary Jacobs, one of Otto's friends, to pick up the bag. Jacobs gave Ronald the bag and his wallet, and then backed up against a wall with his hands raised. The four men then left, and were arrested shortly after. One of the store employees recognized Ronald's voice, having previously worked with him at a pizza restaurant.

== Trials and imprisonment ==
While awaiting trial, the Allridge brothers were sought for questioning in other murders, in which Ronald subsequently confessed to 13 armed robberies and the murder of Buddy Joe Webster. In addition, James was connected to the murder of Brian Clendennen. Both were ordered to stand trial for capital murder. The Jarmon brothers cooperated with the police, saying they didn't know Ronald was going to shoot someone. In an interview with the Oxygen show Killer Siblings decades later, Clarence Jarmon talked about the events immediately following the robbery: "When we got back in the car, the first thing I asked Ronald was, 'Why did you do that?' And his first response was, 'You didn't know the bitch, why do you care?' And I said, 'Man, you just shot the girl in cold blood!' ...Ronald is an evil man... It seemed like whatever Ronald told James to do, James would just do it."

During his trial, Ronald argued that Otto's murder had been unintentional and that the accidental firing of Milton's gun had startled him into pulling the trigger. Both the defense and the prosecution offered their own firearms experts. The expert for the defense, Jack Benton, said that only 2.5 pounds of pressure was needed to pull the trigger on Ronald's shotgun and that while this did not qualify as a hair trigger, it was still considered "extremely low". However, on cross-examination, Benton said he had tried to make the shotgun fire unsuccessfully. The expert for the prosecution, Frank Sheiler, said four pounds of pressure was needed to pull the trigger on Ronald's shotgun. Ronald was convicted of capital murder. During the sentencing phase, the prosecution mentioned Ronald's previous murder conviction and presented evidence of his involvement in multiple other armed robberies. He was sentenced to death.

Unlike his brother, James did not have a criminal record. His defense did not dispute that he was guilty of capital murder. During the sentencing phase, however, they argued that James deserved a life sentence rather than a death sentence, saying he had been a good child growing up and was negatively influenced by Ronald. A psychologist for the defense said James was intelligent and competent, and neither psychotic nor sociopathic. In his opinion, James would not be a threat to society if kept away from his brother. On cross-examination, the psychologist admitted his opinion had been drawn from a two-hour interview with James which happened 33 days before he testified. He also admitted that James and Ronald had taken up the nicknames "ice cube" and "iceberg", respectively. The prosecution presented evidence that James had committed or participated in seven armed robberies, and that the actions James took before and after shooting Brian Clendennen showed calculation and malice aforethought. They said Brian had posed no threat to James beyond the fact that he knew him, and that it was reasonable to conclude that James killed him to avoid being identified. James was sentenced to death.

Although the Jarmon brothers were initially indicted for capital murder, they were ultimately only convicted of aggravated robbery with a deadly weapon. Clarence received a 20-year sentence, while Milton received a 30-year sentence. They have both since been released from prison.

While awaiting execution, James took up painting, and he gained some publicity for the colorful portraits he made by selling them on the internet. Ronald attempted to appeal his sentence multiple times. In 1992, he successfully argued for a stay of execution, and a new execution date was set for June 1995.

== Executions ==
On June 8, 1995, after Texas governor George W. Bush denied him a 30-day reprieve and clemency, Ronald was executed by lethal injection at the Huntsville Unit. He declined a last meal. When asked if he had any last words, Ronald replied "No, I'm not going to say anything." His execution was the tenth in Texas in the year of 1995, and the 95th overall in Texas since executions were brought back in the United States. James was executed on August 26, 2004. His last meal consisted of a double-meat bacon cheeseburger with lettuce, tomato, and salad dressing, shoestring or crinkle-cut french fries with ketchup, banana pudding or banana pudding ice cream, and watermelon or white seedless grapes. When asked for last words, James replied, "Yeah. I want to thank my family and friends, my family for all loving me and giving me so much love. I am sorry, I really am. You, Brian's sister, thanks for your love—it meant a lot. Shane—I hope he finds peace. I am sorry I destroyed you all's life. Thank you for forgiving me. To the moon and back—I love you all." Brian Clendennen's family members denied having forgiven James.

== See also ==
- Capital punishment in Texas
- Capital punishment in the United States
- List of people executed by lethal injection
- List of people executed in Texas, 1990–1999
- List of people executed in Texas, 2000–2009
- List of people executed in the United States in 1995
- List of people executed in the United States in 2004
- List of serial killers in the United States
