= Anthony LaRette =

Executed American serial killer

- Born: Anthony Joe LaRette Jr. October 1, 1951; Topeka, Kansas, U.S.
- Died: November 29, 1995 (aged 44); Potosi Correctional Center, Missouri, U.S.
- Other name: Mike Watson
- Status: Executed by lethal injection
- Convictions: Capital murder; Rape
- Penalty: Death

Details
- Victims: 16–31
- Span of crimes: 1976 – 1980 (confirmed)
- Country: United States
- States: Florida, Missouri, Kansas (others confessed)
- Date apprehended: August 7, 1980

Anthony Joe LaRette Jr. (October 1, 1951 – November 29, 1995) was an American serial killer and rapist. Convicted of one murder in St. Charles, Missouri in 1980, he later confessed to thirty-one murders in eleven states dating back to the late 1960s, fifteen of which were closed based on information provided by him. Sentenced to death for his sole conviction, LaRette was executed in 1995.

== Murders ==
In August 1976, LaRette, posing as "Mike Watson," registered in two separate motels while staying in Marathon, Florida. On August 20, he broke into the home of 26-year-old Jeanette "Mickey" Wade, who had just returned from work. After realizing she had come back, he confronted the woman in the kitchen and stabbed her multiple times before finally cutting her throat. LaRette then left the scene and hitchhiked out of the city, and despite a witness providing a description, he was not caught.

Three days later, now in St. Petersburg, he noticed 52-year-old Betty H. Brunton, an employee at the Memorial Park Cemetery who was returning home to get her lunch. LaRette stalked her to her house, went inside, and stabbed her to death with a knife, leaving the weapon stuck in her stomach. The body was later discovered by co-workers who had become concerned that she had not gone to lunch with them and called the ambulance, initially believing that she had fallen ill with some sort of sickness. An ambulance was dispatched to the house, and attendants went in, but she was pronounced dead at the scene. Officials noted there were no apparent signs of a break-in or struggle. In 1979, The Tampa Tribune published an article in which they speculated that Brunton's murder could have been the doing of John Benjamin Kennedy, an inmate serving a life sentence for an unrelated murder in Oklahoma, but no definitive connection was established.

On December 7, 1977, LaRette was in Kansas City, Missouri, when he came across 24-year-old Beverly Wortmann, a reporter and photographer who was returning to her apartment after going out to buy cigarettes. After stalking her to the apartment, he went inside and stabbed her 19 times before finally slashing her throat and leaving afterwards. Upon discovery of the crime, a 24-year-old man who had been reading the Bible in front of Wortmann's apartment was arrested and queried about her death, as well as two other recent ones that had occurred in the city. The unnamed man vehemently denied any involvement in any of the crimes, and as nothing connected him to the killings, he was subsequently released without charges.

On May 20, 1978, 60-year-old Helen Alderson Hall, whose family was prominent in greyhound racing, was found in her St. Petersburg home by her son Richard. Upon examining the crime scene, the authorities concluded that she had been bludgeoned to death with an unknown object in her bedroom by her assailant. However, they were unable to determine a concrete motive, as there was no sign of forced entry. Her 1971 light-green Lincoln Continental was missing, and it was supposed that it was stolen by her killer. At the time, sheriffs were unable to find any potential suspects.

On November 2, 1978, a secretary for a law firm based in Manhattan, Kansas, went to the home of 26-year-old Tracey Gladys Miller to check on her, as she had not attended lunch with her colleagues. She found Miller's body in the stairway. After notifying her neighbor, both women called an ambulance. At the hospital, it was determined that the victim had been stabbed multiple times and that her throat had been slashed. As part of their investigation, police combed the wooded area around the house but were unable to find any substantial clues to point towards the killer. A secret witness program was established by police in an attempt to gather clues, but this proved to be futile as no arrests were made.

=== Murder of Mary Fleming ===
On July 25, 1980, LaRette arrived in St. Charles, Missouri, when he happened upon 18-year-old Mary Fleming, who was returning to her parents' apartment from grocery shopping at the nearby Hedges & Hafer supermarket. After following her to the apartment and making sure she was alone, he crept inside and attacked Fleming, ripping off her clothes in an attempted rape. LaRette stabbed her twice in the chest and slashed her throat before fleeing through the front door. Fleming, clad only in a bikini top, ran to the home of a neighbor before collapsing. An ambulance was called, and she was taken to St. Joseph Hospital, where she succumbed to her injuries.

Investigation at first proved difficult, as there was no apparent motive for the attack. Initially, it was suggested that Fleming's death might be related to other recent crimes in the area, but these possibilities were later ruled out. Two days later, an autopsy report confirmed that Fleming had not been sexually assaulted, and on the same day, police released a sketch of a possible witness, complete with details of his appearance and his vehicle.

== Arrest, investigation and trial ==
Almost a week later, the man depicted in the sketch was identified as LaRette, who was reportedly visiting some friends in St. Charles who lived in the same area as Fleming. An arrest warrant charging him with murder was subsequently issued. Missouri police sent sheriffs to arrest him at his permanent address in Topeka, Kansas. However, he had fled the area, causing authorities from both states to ask the FBI for assistance in case of a possible manhunt. A day later, LaRette was found at his sister's house, and he attempted to commit suicide by slashing his neck and one of his wrists. His injuries proved to be minor, and he was taken into custody.

After waiving extradition to Missouri, LaRette was returned to St. Charles and lodged in the county jail, where authorities planned to question him about a series of rapes that occurred around the time of Fleming's murder. He was held on $500,000 bond. Detectives discovered that LaRette had a previous conviction for raping a woman in Lawrence, Kansas in 1974. On August 12, the St. Charles prosecutor announced that he had upgraded the initial charge of first-degree murder to capital murder.

Five days after this announcement, officials from the Riley County Police Department and the KBI executed a search warrant of LaRette's residence in connection to the unsolved murder of Tracey Miller. After searching his apartment and car, Riley County Attorney Dennis Sauter announced that they would likely file murder charges against LaRette after finding items they believed could link him to the Miller case. In conjunction with this, they also declared that they would be investigating him for other unsolved murders committed in the state and possibly elsewhere. On September 19, LaRette unsuccessfully attempted to escape from prison by cutting through his cell's lock using a hacksaw, but he was prevented from doing so by another inmate, who informed the deputies.

At a preliminary hearing, the prosecution introduced testimony by Richard Roberson, the friend whom LaRette had been visiting on the day he killed Fleming. According to his testimony, Roberson had invited "Tony" to spend a week at his house and had even let him drive his car, a yellow Buick convertible. After reading about the murder in the newspaper, he immediately phoned LaRette, who had left Missouri, and questioned him about his responsibility, eventually leading to LaRette confessing and even explaining how he had done it. In spite of these claims, LaRette entered a plea of not guilty at his arraignment.

In April 1981, LaRette conspired with his father, Anthony Sr., to hire men to kill the guards who would take Anthony Jr. to the hospital after he feigned illness. The plan was thwarted when Anthony Sr. offered $400 to a police informant, who then relayed the escape plan to the police department. Both father and son were charged with conspiracy to murder.

At LaRette's murder trial, which began on August 11, prosecutor Donald L. Kohl presented color crime scene photographs to illustrate the brutality of the murder. LaRette and his attorneys contended that LaRette had been the accomplice of a male hitchhiker who was the actual killer. This theory was dismissed by Kohl, who pointed out that LaRette had given him two radically different stories, in the second of which he claimed that he was solely responsible but had killed Fleming by accident.

== Sentence, imprisonment and execution ==
After a change of venue to Warrenton due to pretrial publicity, LaRette was found guilty by jury verdict after one hour of deliberations with a recommendation that he be sentenced to death. Justice Edward Hodge promptly sentenced LaRette to death. LaRette reportedly showed no visible emotion during sentencing. A week after sentencing, the charges in regard to the attempted prison escape were dropped. The sentence was appealed to the Supreme Court of Missouri, with LaRette's attorney, Donald Tiemeyer, arguing that the killing was not pre-planned and was influenced by his client's emotional and marital problems. This claim was rebuked by Attorney General Kelly Klopfenstein, who argued that the fact that LaRette had stalked his victim to her residence proved that he had planned it in advance.

Six years after his death sentence was upheld, Riley County officials again attempted to have LaRette extradited to face charges in Tracey Miller's murder. The district attorney, Bill Kennedy, faced accusations that the extradition request was a political move against his Republican opponent in the upcoming county attorney race.

By late November 1988, LaRette contacted investigators from Florida and Missouri and gave detailed, recorded confessions to the Wade and Wortmann killings. He provided accurate descriptions of both crimes: in the Wade case, he said that he had used the "Mike Watson" alias while in the state and had used a fillet knife to break into the woman's home, which he then threw under a bridge. As for the Wortmann case, LaRette recalled his movements, the placement of the surrounding buildings and the layout of the victim's apartment, as well as how he had threatened her at gunpoint and stabbed her to death. When quizzed as to what he did with the knife, he claimed that he threw it in a sewer in Topeka.

Despite his confessions, attorneys in the respective states announced that they would not charge him with the murders, as LaRette was already on death row.

The Kansas Attorney General's Office continued to fight for his extradition to their state, succeeding in securing the proceedings in June 1989. However, the proceedings were dropped three months later. Attorney General Robert Stephan said he had done so due to high costs and out of respect for Tracey Miller's family, who did not want to go through with a trial.

=== Execution ===
With his appeals exhausted, LaRette was scheduled to be executed on November 29, 1995; at the time, he was Missouri's longest-serving death row inmate after serving almost 15 years. The day before his scheduled execution date, he was granted a stay of execution by District Court Justice Catherine D. Perry, on the grounds that the claims of ineffective counsel and supposed mental illness be taken under consideration. The stay of execution was lifted the next day, with the orders that the execution move forward.

On that day, LaRette confessed to a total of 31 murders and 10 rapes he had committed in 11 states while drifting across the country. At the time, the details of these confessions were not publicized. Later that day, LaRette was executed via lethal injection at the Potosi Correctional Center. In his final statement, he apologized to both his and his victims' family members, saying: "I'm sorry it had to come this way." His last meal consisted of steak, a dozen fried shrimp, baked potato, fried potatoes, fried mushrooms, fried onion rings, and two cans of Coca-Cola.

=== Confessions ===
About a week after LaRette's execution, the Montgomery Advertiser published an interview with Sheriff's Detective Patricia Juhl, who had conducted multiple interviews with LaRette since 1989. Thanks to her interviews, detectives across several states closed the books on approximately 15 murders, and Juhl was later named "Deputy of the Year" for her achievements.

Aside from his conviction for Flemming's murder, authorities believe LaRette was responsible for the murders of Wade, Brunton, Wortmann, Hall, Miller and ten additional victims, whose identities have not been revealed. He provided details for the following crimes:

- a non-fatal assault of a high school girl in North Little Rock, Arkansas
- an undisclosed murder in Denver, Colorado
- two to three murders committed across Florida
- an unsolved murder somewhere within Illinois, but was unable to give an exact location
- at least 8 murders committed across Kansas, without naming locations
- three murders committed in three Louisiana cities (Morgan City, Houma and Grand Isle)
- another murder in Kansas City, Missouri and one more in Independence, Missouri
- two killings in Biloxi, Mississippi
- a singular murder in Omaha, Nebraska
- two murders in Texas (one in Dallas and another in Houston)
- one murder committed on an Interstate highway between Virginia and Maryland

== In the media and culture ==
- Mary Fleming's murder was covered on season 11 of On the Case with Paula Zahn.

== See also ==
- Capital punishment in Missouri
- List of people executed by lethal injection
- List of people executed in Missouri
- List of people executed in the United States in 1995
- List of serial killers in the United States

== Bibliography ==
- Dennis Fleming (May 27, 2008). She Had No Enemies: How I Turned My Sister's Death By A Serial Killer Into A Positive Force In My Life. KDP.
- Dennis Fleming (March 22, 2012). The Girl Who Had No Enemies. CreateSpace Independent Publishing Platform. ISBN 978-1467993579.
