= Samuel Christopher Hawkins =

Executed American murderer and serial rapist

- Born: January 9, 1943; Jefferson County, Georgia, U.S.
- Died: February 21, 1995 (aged 52); Huntsville Unit, Huntsville, Texas, U.S.
- Cause of death: Execution by lethal injection
- Other name: "The Traveling Rapist"
- Convictions: Texas: Capital murder x2 Rape; Colorado: Rape; Oklahoma: Burglary
- Penalty: Texas: Death (murders); Life imprisonment (Rape)

Details
- Victims: 2
- Span of crimes: 1976–1977
- Country: United States
- State: Texas
- Date apprehended: June 30, 1977

Samuel Christopher Hawkins (January 9, 1943 – February 21, 1995), known as The Traveling Rapist, was an American murderer and serial rapist who committed two murders in Texas, from 1976 to 1977. Following his arrest, he was linked to numerous rapes committed across multiple states.

Convicted and sentenced to death for the two murders, he was executed in 1995.

== Early life ==
Relatively little is known of Hawkins' upbringing. Born on January 9, 1943, in Jefferson County, Georgia, he claimed to have started preaching at age 15 as a minister for a black Evangelical church named "The Church of God in Christ", traveling between the states of Georgia, Alabama and Florida. At some point prior to 1975, he was incarcerated at a prison in Colorado for rape and another in Oklahoma for burglary, and after his release, he started traveling around the Texas Panhandle, working as a butcher.

== Crimes ==
On February 2, 1976, Hawkins abducted 12-year-old Rhonda Ann Keys from her home in Amarillo, Texas and drove her to an isolated area, where he bound, raped and bludgeoned her to death with an unknown object. He then abandoned her body at a culvert near Panhandle, covering her face with a blood-soaked pillow. The body was found a week later, with investigators surmizing that the killing took place elsewhere due to the little amount of blood present at the crime scene. Two days after this, her mother was admitted into a hospital after being severely beaten by an unknown assailant, but this was quickly ruled to be unrelated to the murder of Rhonda.

The next known murder occurred the following year on May 20, 1977. On that date, Hawkins attacked 19-year-old Abbe Rodgers Hamilton, a pregnant woman, at her home in Borger. After restraining her, Hawkins proceeded to rape and then stab her 20 times, attempting to decapitate her before fleeing the crime scene. The murder caused a shock to the local community, and a reward fund was organized by locals in an attempt to apprehend the killer.

== Arrest, investigation and trial ==
At around noon of June 30, 1977, Hawkins was arrested in Amarillo after several witnesses reported that they had seen a man matching his description attempting to break into some houses. After questioning and gathering evidence on him, authorities announced that he was charged with the rape of a woman in Hereford and was additionally being investigated for the two murders and at least thirty to forty rapes dating back to 1975. Due to the fact that they occurred in across Texas and the states of Colorado, Oklahoma and Florida, Hawkins was labeled "The Traveling Rapist" by the media. In order to gather additional evidence against him, authorities placed several of the rape victims and some witnesses under hypnosis. For their contributions to his arrest, three residents of Amarillo were awarded varying portions of the $17,000 reward fund.

Not long after, Hawkins was charged with two counts of capital murder and several counts of aggravated rape, for which he was placed on a combined total of $600,000 bail. While investigating his involvement in the rapes, Police Chief Lee Spradlin announced that his department was investigating the possibility that Hawkins might have had an accomplice in some of the attacks.

After being denied bond for the capital murder charges, Hawkins was set to stand trial at a courtroom in Stinnett for the murder of Rodgers. His trial was set for February 7, 1978. Before his trial date came, Hawkins gave an interview to the Amarillo Globe-News in which he accused District Attorney Tom Curtis of forcing the psychiatrist who examined him to change his evaluation from psychotic to sane. Said psychiatrist, Dr. Hugh Pennal, later denied ever giving such an evaluation, stating that Hawkins had never been diagnosed as psychotic. In that same interview, Hawkins also claimed to have been driven by an uncontrollable "sex drive" and that he harbored anger against white Americans for injustices against his black people he had seen ever since he was young.

On March 16, 1978, Hawkins was found guilty for the Rodgers murder - upon hearing the verdict, he provided no comment. He was subsequently sentenced to death for this murder, with his second trial for the Keys murder scheduled for October of that year, with Hawkins opting to represent himself. The trial was delayed to November 27, and was held in Austin. By the end, he was found guilty on all counts and sentenced to death a second time.

== Imprisonment and execution ==
=== Stays of execution ===
Following his conviction, Hawkins would submit numerous appeals that would delay his execution on multiple occasions. The first notable instance of this was a planned execution date on March 1, 1982, for the murder of Keys. However, this was canceled when a Court of Appeals ordered a compentency hearing on the grounds that Hawkins was mentally ill and refused to interact with his lawyer.

Two years later, Justice J. E. Blackburn signed a second death warrant, setting an execution date for October 4, 1984. Just hours after this announcement, it was stayed by federal judge Halbert Owen Woodward, who instead ordered that Hawkins must undergo another competency hearing.

In October 1988, Hawkins and another death row inmate lost their final appeals before the Supreme Court. Death warrants were signed for both men, but Hawkins was granted another stay of execution.

On February 10, 1993, Hawkins received his fourth execution date, but the courts were again asked to consider last-minute appeals. Later that day, he was granted yet another stay of execution by the Supreme Court. Approximately four days later, the San Angelo Standard-Times interviewed Dominique Malon, a 42-year-old French pen pal of Hawkins, who had recently donated $15,000 to his bank account. At the same time, Rodgers' parents and friends also gave an interview to the media, stating that they were frustrated with the slow pace of the justice system and that they wanted their daughter's killer to be executed.

In December 1994, Hawkins would receive yet another execution date. Hours before he was scheduled to be executed, he gave an interview to the media in which he said claimed that the death penalty was inhumane, that he was reformed and that his crimes were brought on by the teachings of his father, who claimed that the only way to exact revenge on white men was to rape their women. Not long after, he would receive yet another stay of execution.

=== Execution ===
On February 21, 1995, Hawkins was scheduled for execution for the sixth time. Unlike previous occasions, he did not receive a stay and was promptly escorted to the death chamber at the Huntsville Unit. At around 12:14 AM, Hawkins was executed by lethal injection, offering no final statement. His last meal consisted of a double-meat cheeseburger, french fries and tea.

Following his death, his real estate was transferred to Malon, as she was designated his sole heir. The entire ordeal was later described in a news article by reporter Jim Dwyer, who was present as a witness at the execution.

== See also ==
- 1995 Okinawa rape incident
- Capital punishment in Texas Capital punishment in the United States
- List of people executed by lethal injection
- List of people executed in Texas, 1990–1999
- List of people executed in the United States in 1995
- List of serial rapists
