= List of people executed in the United States in 1995 =

Fifty-six people, all male, were executed in the United States in 1995, forty-nine by lethal injection and seven by electrocution. Pennsylvania carried out its first execution since 1962. The execution of Kermit Smith Jr. marked only the second time since 1976 that a white defendant was executed for killing a black victim. Several others followed later in the year.

== List of people executed in the United States in 1995 ==
No.	Date of execution	Name	Age of person			Gender	Ethnicity	State	Method	Ref.
No.	Date of execution	Name	At execution	At offense	Age difference	Gender	Ethnicity	State	Method	Ref.
1	January 4, 1995	Jesse Dewayne Jacobs	44	36	8	Male	White	Texas	Lethal injection	
2	January 17, 1995	Mario S. Marquez	36	25	11	Male	Hispanic	Texas	Lethal injection	
3	January 24, 1995	Kermit Smith Jr.	37	23	14	Male	White	North Carolina	Lethal injection	
4	January 24, 1995	Dana Ray Edmonds	32	21	11	Male	Black	Virginia	Lethal injection	
5	January 31, 1995	Clifton Charles Russell Jr.	33	18	15	Male	White	Texas	Lethal injection	
6	January 31, 1995	Willie Ray Williams	38	24	14	Male	Black	Texas	Lethal injection	
7	February 7, 1995	Jeffrey Dean Motley	29	18	11	Male	White	Texas	Lethal injection	
8	February 16, 1995	Billy Conn Gardner	51	39	12	Male	White	Texas	Lethal injection	
9	February 21, 1995	Samuel Christopher Hawkins	52	34	18	Male	Black	Texas	Lethal injection	
10	March 17, 1995	Nelson Walter Shelton	27	24	3	Male	White	Delaware	Lethal injection	
11	March 20, 1995	Thomas Joseph Grasso	32	28	4	Male	White	Oklahoma	Lethal injection	
12	March 22, 1995	James Preston Free Jr.	36	19	17	Male	White	Illinois	Lethal injection	
13	March 22, 1995	Hernando Williams	40	23	17	Male	Black	Illinois	Lethal injection	
14	April 6, 1995	Noble D. Mays Jr.	41	25	16	Male	White	Texas	Lethal injection	
15	April 7, 1995	Nicholas Lee Ingram	31	19	12	Male	White	Georgia	Electrocution	
16	April 19, 1995	Richard Wayne Snell	64	53	11	Male	White	Arkansas	Lethal injection	
17	April 28, 1995	Willie Clisby Jr.	47	31	16	Male	Black	Alabama	Electrocution	
18	May 2, 1995	Keith William Zettlemoyer	39	25	14	Male	White	Pennsylvania	Lethal injection	
19	May 3, 1995	Emmitt Foster	43	32	11	Male	Black	Missouri	Lethal injection	
20	May 10, 1995	Duncan Peder McKenzie Jr.	43	22	21	Male	White	Montana	Lethal injection	
21	May 12, 1995	Varnell Weeks	43	29	14	Male	Black	Alabama	Electrocution	
22	May 16, 1995	Thomas Lee Ward	59	47	12	Male	Black	Louisiana	Lethal injection	
23	May 17, 1995	Girvies L. Davis	37	20	17	Male	Black	Illinois	Lethal injection	
24	May 17, 1995	Darrell Gene Devier Sr.	39	24	15	Male	White	Georgia	Electrocution	
25	May 25, 1995	Willie Lloyd Turner	49	32	17	Male	Black	Virginia	Lethal injection	
26	June 1, 1995	Fletcher Thomas Mann	34	19	15	Male	White	Texas	Lethal injection	
27	June 8, 1995	Ronald Keith Allridge	34	24	10	Male	Black	Texas	Lethal injection	
28	June 20, 1995	John W. Fearance Jr.	40	23	17	Male	Black	Texas	Lethal injection	
29	June 21, 1995	Karl Hammond	30	22	8	Male	Black	Texas	Lethal injection	
30	June 21, 1995	Larry Griffin	40	25	15	Male	Black	Missouri	Lethal injection	
31	July 1, 1995	Roger Dale Stafford	43	26	17	Male	White	Oklahoma	Lethal injection	
32	July 18, 1995	Bernard John Bolender	42	27	15	Male	White	Florida	Electrocution	
33	July 26, 1995	Robert Anthony Murray	32	22	10	Male	Black	Missouri	Lethal injection	
34	August 11, 1995	Robert Allen Brecheen	40	27	13	Male	White	Oklahoma	Lethal injection	
35	August 15, 1995	Vernon Lamar Sattiewhite	39	30	9	Male	Black	Texas	Lethal injection	
36	August 16, 1995	Leon Jerome Moser	52	42	10	Male	White	Pennsylvania	Lethal injection	
37	August 18, 1995	Sylvester Lewis Adams	39	23	16	Male	Black	South Carolina	Lethal injection	
38	August 31, 1995	Barry Lee Fairchild	41	28	13	Male	Black	Arkansas	Lethal injection	
39	September 13, 1995	Jimmie Wayne Jeffers	49	30	19	Male	White	Arizona	Lethal injection	
40	September 19, 1995	Carl Johnson Jr.	40	23	17	Male	Black	Texas	Lethal injection	
41	September 20, 1995	Charles Michael Albanese	58	43	15	Male	White	Illinois	Lethal injection	
42	September 22, 1995	Phillip Lee Ingle	34	29	5	Male	White	North Carolina	Lethal injection	
43	September 27, 1995	Dennis Waldon Stockton	54	37	17	Male	White	Virginia	Lethal injection	
44	October 4, 1995	Harold Joe Lane	50	37	13	Male	White	Texas	Lethal injection	
45	October 19, 1995	Mickey Wayne Davidson	38	33	5	Male	White	Virginia	Lethal injection	
46	November 13, 1995	Herman Charles Barnes	31	21	10	Male	Black	Virginia	Lethal injection	
47	November 15, 1995	Robert T. Sidebottom	33	23	10	Male	White	Missouri	Lethal injection	
48	November 22, 1995	George W. Del Vecchio	47	29	18	Male	White	Illinois	Lethal injection	
49	November 29, 1995	Anthony Joe LaRette Jr.	44	28	16	Male	White	Missouri	Lethal injection	
50	December 4, 1995	Jerry White	47	33	14	Male	Black	Florida	Electrocution	
51	December 5, 1995	Phillip Alexander Atkins	40	26	14	Male	White	Florida	Electrocution	
52	December 6, 1995	Robert Earl O'Neal Jr.	34	22	12	Male	White	Missouri	Lethal injection	
53	December 6, 1995	Bernard Eugene Amos	33	26	7	Male	Black	Texas	Lethal injection	
54	December 7, 1995	Hai Hai Vuong	40	31	9	Male	Asian	Texas	Lethal injection	
55	December 11, 1995	Esequel Banda	31	22	9	Male	Hispanic	Texas	Lethal injection	
56	December 12, 1995	James Michael Briddle	40	24	16	Male	White	Texas	Lethal injection	
		Average:	41 years	28 years	13 years					

== Demographics ==
Gender
Male	56	100%
Female	0	0%
Ethnicity
White	31	55%
Black	22	39%
Hispanic	2	4%
Asian	1	2%
State
Texas	19	34%
Missouri	6	11%
Illinois	5	9%
Virginia	5	9%
Florida	3	5%
Oklahoma	3	5%
Alabama	2	4%
Arkansas	2	4%
Georgia	2	4%
North Carolina	2	4%
Pennsylvania	2	4%
Arizona	1	2%
Delaware	1	2%
Louisiana	1	2%
Montana	1	2%
South Carolina	1	2%
Method
Lethal injection	49	88%
Electrocution	7	13%
Month
January	6	11%
February	3	5%
March	4	7%
April	4	7%
May	8	14%
June	5	9%
July	3	5%
August	5	9%
September	5	9%
October	2	4%
November	4	7%
December	7	13%
Age
20–29	2	4%
30–39	24	43%
40–49	22	39%
50–59	7	13%
60–69	1	2%
Total	56	100%

== Executions in recent years ==
Number of executions
1996	45
1995	56
1994	31
Total	132

Preceded by 1994	List of people executed in the United States in 1995	Succeeded by 1996
