= Larry Griffin =

American murderer (1954–1995)

Larry Griffin (September 23, 1954 – June 21, 1995) was sentenced to death for the murder of 19-year-old Quintin Moss in St. Louis, Missouri on the afternoon of June 26, 1980. Moss was killed in a drive-by shooting while allegedly dealing substances on a street corner. Griffin killed Moss since he was the prime suspect in the murder of his brother. Griffin shot and wounded another man, Robert Campbell, during a previous murder attempt against Moss, and a second man, Robert Campbell, during his second and successful attempt. He also pleaded guilty to the murder of another man named Sylvester Crawford.

== Prior convictions ==
Griffin's lengthy criminal record was a major factor in his death sentence. In 1974, he received concurrent terms of three and two years imprisonment for two counts of second degree burglary. In May 1977, he was arrested for theft under $50,000. He was sentenced to six months of probation. A month later, he was sentenced to three years in prison for felony possession of a controlled substance, stealing over $50,000, misdemeanor assault, and possession of marijuana. In 1979, Griffin was sentenced to 10 years in prison for first degree robbery, felony possession of a controlled substance, second degree burglary, and carrying a concealed weapon.

After being sentenced to death, Griffin pleaded guilty to second degree murder in the unrelated slaying of another victim named Sylvester Crawford.

== Death ==
Appeals courts upheld his conviction and death sentence. Griffin was executed via lethal injection on June 21, 1995. Griffin maintained his innocence right up to his execution.

== Re-opened investigation ==
After Griffin's execution, a 2005 post-execution investigation was sponsored by the NAACP Legal Defense and Educational Fund. This NAACP investigation raised doubts about the conviction (specifically as to the shooter's identity), and subsequently caused an investigation by the St. Louis City Circuit Attorney's Office. The St. Louis City investigation ended in a finding that "the right person was convicted". The investigation found a new witness who corroborated the testimony of Robert Fitzgerald, who was the key witness against Griffin at his trial.

== See also ==
- Capital punishment in Missouri
- Capital punishment in the United States
- List of people executed in Missouri
- List of people executed in the United States in 1995
