= Richard Cartwright (murderer) =

American murderer (1974–2005)

- Born: February 11, 1974; Chicago, Illinois, U.S.
- Died: May 19, 2005 (aged 31); Huntsville Unit, Texas, U.S.
- Status: Executed by lethal injection
- Conviction: Capital murder
- Penalty: Death

Details
- Victims: Nick Moraida, 37
- Date: August 1, 1996

Richard Michael Cartwright (February 11, 1974 – May 19, 2005) was a death row inmate and activist who was executed by the state of Texas for the stabbing and shooting of 37-year-old Nick Moraida during a robbery in Corpus Christi on August 1, 1996.

Cartwright became known with the Abolishment of the Death Penalty Movement after contributing to a series of articles known as Uncensored from Texas Death Row. After his execution, Clinton Lee Young, who was removed from Texas Death Row January 2022, took over the Uncensored from Texas Death Row articles.

Cartwright never denied being a part of the robbery which resulted in Moraida's death, however, he maintained his innocence regarding the death of Moraida. Cartwright, Dennis Hagood and Kelly Overstreet planned to rob a gay man by posing as male prostitutes. They thought such a victim would be an easy target because he would be less apt to report the robbery to police. They met 37-year-old Nick Moraida after he pulled up in a small black sports car. The trio invited Moraida to go drinking with them at a remote gulfside park. When they reached the secluded area, Cartwright pulled out a gun and said, "This is a robbery. Put your hands on the cement [wall]." At the same time, Overstreet held a knife to Moraida's neck. Their plan turned deadly when Moraida refused to give up and tried to flee. One of the men tried to stab Moraida but could not kill him. According to Hagood and Overstreet, Cartwright then shot him in the back with a .38 caliber pistol. Hagood and Overstreet both testified against Cartwright in exchange for reduced sentences; Hagood received 20 years imprisonment and Overstreet received 50 years. Death penalty proponents argue that Cartwright confessed to the murder when he apologized to the family of the victim during his last statement. However, his supporters point out that he never denied being a part of the robbery which resulted in Moraida's death and was apologizing for being involved.

Several months after Cartwright's death, his supporters still claim he had an effect on the abolishment movement against the death penalty, including among his fellow inmates.

For his last meal, Cartwright requested fried chicken, a cheeseburger, onion rings, french fries, bacon, sausage, cheesecake, and cinnamon rolls. When asked if he had a final statement, he said:

Yes, I do. I just want to thank all my friends and family who gave me support these past eight years. I want to apologise to the victim's family for the pain I caused them. And to everyone at the Polunsky Unit, just keep your heads up and stay strong.

After his final statement, the lethal injection was started and Cartwright was pronounced dead at 6:16 p.m.

== See also ==
- Capital punishment in Texas
- Capital punishment in the United States
- List of people executed in Texas, 2000–2009
- List of people executed in the United States in 2005
