= Uncensored from Texas Death Row =

Series of magazine articles

Uncensored from Texas Death Row is a series of articles originally started by Paul Colella that gives readers an impression of life on Death Row in Texas through the eyes of the inmates.

Richard Cartwright took over when Colella was released from Death Row on August 12, 2003, after having had his sentenced reduced to 20 years imprisonment. After Cartwright's execution on May 19, 2005, Clinton Lee Young took over.

One notable contributor was Hank Skinner, the human rights activist convicted of the murder of his girlfriend Twila Busby and her children in 1993.

== See also ==
- Capital punishment in Texas
