= Barry Lee Fairchild =

American criminal

Barry Lee Fairchild (March 5, 1954 in Little Rock, Arkansas – August 31, 1995) was an American convicted kidnapper, rapist, and murderer.

== Case ==
Fairchild was arrested for the February 26, 1983 kidnapping, rape, and murder of Marjorie "Greta" Mason, a 22-year-old United States Air Force nurse, after police received information from a confidential informant implicating Fairchild and his brother. At trial, he recanted his two videotaped confessions, claiming that Pulaski County Sheriff Tommy F. Robinson and Chief Deputy Larry Dill had beaten and threatened to kill him unless he confessed, then rehearsed him before the second confession was taped. His attorneys claimed that Fairchild was intellectually disabled and did not have the capacity to know right from wrong. He was convicted on August 2, 1983, and sentenced to death. The court found that Fairchild was not intellectually disabled. He had contradictory scores on his IQ tests, at one point scoring as high as 87. Fairchild was determined to be a malingerer who feigned memory loss.

In 1993, the United States District Court for the Eastern District of Arkansas ruled the state had failed to prove that Fairchild had killed Mason. Finding that Fairchild had only been an accomplice to the murder, the court ruled that he no longer met the requirements for the death penalty and ordered his sentence commuted to life without parole. However, the United States Court of Appeals for the Eighth Circuit reversed the District Court in 1994. Fairchild was executed on August 31, 1995, at the Varner Unit near Grady after the United States Supreme Court refused to hear a final appeal, because of "abuse of the writ", since Fairchild had already petitioned for habeas corpus.

Prior to his execution, Fairchild said his brother, Robert Fairchild, had committed the murder, but admitted to being an accomplice who had conceal his brother's involvement. Fairchild said that had he known how his brother would turn out, he would not have protected him. In 1990, Robert was sentenced to life in prison for kidnapping and raping a 17-year-old boy. In 1999, he beat and stabbed a prison guard, leaving him with permanent brain damage and crippled from the waist down.

== See also ==
- Capital punishment in Arkansas
- Capital punishment in the United States
- List of people executed in Arkansas
- List of people executed in the United States in 1995

== Notes ==
- Death Penalty Information Center
