= Kermit Smith Jr. =

Executed by the state of North Carolina 1995

- Born: June 7, 1957; Halifax County, North Carolina, U.S.
- Died: January 24, 1995 (aged 37); Central Prison, Raleigh, North Carolina, U.S.
- Cause of death: Execution by lethal injection
- Motive: Misogyny
- Convictions: First degree murder First degree kidnapping Second degree rape Robbery; Breaking and entering Assault of a police officer Simple assault
- Penalty: Death

Kermit Smith Jr. (June 7, 1957 – January 24, 1995) was an American convicted murderer who was executed by the state of North Carolina for the kidnap, rape, and murder of a 20-year-old college cheerleader. At the time of his execution, The New York Times and Associated Press noted that Smith was just the second white person to be executed for the murder of a black victim since capital punishment was reinstated in 1976.

== Crime ==
On December 4, 1980, 23-year-old Kermit Smith Jr. of Roanoke Rapids, North Carolina was taken into custody for the murder of 20-year-old Whelette Collins and the abduction of two other women, Dawn Killen and Yolanda Marie Woods, both 19 after a basketball game the previous night at North Carolina Wesleyan College in Rocky Mount, North Carolina. All three victims were noted to have been black, albeit the crime did not appear to have been racially motivated.

Killen and Woods told officers they were forced at gunpoint into the trunk of the car near Wesleyan's gymnasium, while Collins was forced to ride in the passenger seat from Rocky Mount to Weldon, North Carolina. Smith took the women to a wooded area where he raped and bludgeoned Collins to death.

The two surviving abductees escaped Smith after attacking him with a lug wrench and a straightened-out safety pin. The women hid in the woods until morning when they were picked up on Interstate 95 by a passing motorist who stopped a North Carolina State Highway Patrol officer, who notified local authorities.

When police arrived with the women at the scene hours later, they found Smith still there in bloody clothing. The women identified him and he was arrested on the spot. Collins's body was found nearby.

== Trial ==
On April 29, 1981, Smith was sentenced to death in Halifax County, North Carolina. In addition to death, he was sentenced to 40 years for rape and 10 years for robbery. Smith told reporters that he regretted his actions but claimed he did not understand the significance of them due to stress. He further stated he was not particularly ready to die but if faced with spending the rest of his life in prison, he preferred the alternative.

A diary Smith kept that was later recovered showed that he had long planned the crime, motivated by misogyny. He had previously served time for a violent attack on a couple on August 14, 1975. He noted in his diary that he had intended to kidnap and take the woman into the woods. In that case, Smith got an 18-month suspended sentence and three years probation for assault. At the sentencing phase of his murder trial, two psychiatrists determined that he had antisocial personality disorder.

In 1982, Kermit Smith was additionally sentenced to 25 years in prison for the kidnappings as part of a plea bargain.

== Execution ==
On January 24, 1995, Smith was executed by lethal injection for the murder of Whelette Collins. He was pronounced dead at 2:12 a.m. His last meal consisted of four pieces of Kentucky Fried Chicken, a Mountain Dew, and a Pepsi. Smith requested that Collins's mother personally execute him by operating the machine that would administer the lethal injection. He supposedly requested this as a way of atoning for his crime; however, the request was denied.

== See also ==
- Capital punishment in North Carolina
- Capital punishment in the United States
- List of people executed in North Carolina
- List of people executed in the United States in 1995
- List of white defendants executed for killing a black victim
- Race and capital punishment in the United States

Executions carried out in North Carolina
Preceded by David Lawson June 15, 1994	Kermit Smith Jr. January 24, 1995	Succeeded by Phillip Ingle September 22, 1995
Executions carried out in the United States
Preceded by Mario Marquez – Texas January 17, 1995	Kermit Smith Jr. – North Carolina; January 24, 1995	Succeeded by Dana Edmonds – Virginia January 24, 1995
