= Thomas J. Grasso =

American murderer (1962–1995)

- Born: Thomas Joseph Grasso; November 23, 1962; West Babylon, New York, U.S.
- Died: March 20, 1995 (aged 32); Oklahoma State Penitentiary, McAlester, Oklahoma, U.S.
- Cause of death: Execution by lethal injection
- Known for: Notable last words
- Spouse: Lana Grasso
- Motive: Robbery
- Convictions: Oklahoma; First degree murder New York; Second degree murder
- Penalty: Oklahoma; Death; New York; 20 years to life in prison

Details
- Victims: Hilda Johnson, aged 87; Leslie Holtz, aged 81
- Date: December 24, 1990 (murder of Johnson); July 4, 1991 (murder of Holtz)
- Locations: Tulsa, Oklahoma (murder of Johnson); Staten Island, New York (murder of Holtz)
- Weapon: Strangling cord

Thomas Joseph Grasso (November 23, 1962 – March 20, 1995) was an American convicted murderer who was executed by the state of Oklahoma for the murder of 87-year-old Hilda Johnson, whom he strangled in Tulsa in December 1990. He also murdered 81-year-old Leslie Holtz in New York in July 1991. He became posthumously well known for his last words regarding his last meal, "I did not get my SpaghettiOs, I got spaghetti. I want the press to know this."

== Early life ==
Thomas Joseph Grasso was born on November 23, 1962, in West Babylon, New York to Joseph and Ruth Grasso. Prior to his birth, his older brother, who was named Joseph Thomas Grasso, was killed at the age of 4 when a neighbor backed a car over him. Thomas was intended to be named after his deceased brother, but his mother instead named him Thomas Joseph after a psychic warned her that the child would die if she named him Joseph.

The Grasso family moved to Tampa, Florida while Thomas was still young. In Tampa, he built up a lengthy rap sheet of offenses, mostly for theft, and stole from two of his employers. In October 1990, he left the area and went with his girlfriend, Lana, to stay at her grandma's house in Tulsa, Oklahoma.

== Murders ==
On December 24, 1990, Grasso strangled Hilda Johnson, an 87-year-old woman, using her Christmas tree lights in her Tulsa home. He stole $8 from her purse, $4 in loose change, and her television set which he sold for $125. Lana's grandma was the neighbor and best friend of Johnson.

Six months later, after moving to New York with Lana, his now wife, he murdered Leslie Holtz, an 81-year-old man from Staten Island, on July 4, 1991, stealing his Social Security check.

== Arrest and conviction ==
New York detectives investigating the murder of Leslie Holtz arrested Grasso and within two weeks he had confessed to police. He first told investigators about the Staten Island killing, then about the murder of Hilda Johnson. Grasso pleaded guilty and was sentenced to 20 years to life on April 21, 1992, for the murder of Holtz. On September 28, 1992, Grasso pleaded guilty to murdering Johnson and was sentenced to death in Oklahoma after requesting a death sentence. After appearing on a talk show from prison in 1993, Grasso apologized to Johnson's daughter and said he had feigned a lack of remorse in order to increase his chances of a death sentence.

The New York legislature had passed legislation that would have restored the state's death penalty, but governors Hugh Carey and Mario Cuomo, who were both opposed to capital punishment, vetoed the legislation.

== Extradition and execution ==
Grasso's case became an issue in George E. Pataki's gubernatorial campaign and 11 days after Pataki took office, Grasso was extradited, fulfilling the new governor's campaign pledge. Pataki and Governor Frank Keating of Oklahoma, both Republicans, signed an agreement that allowed Oklahoma correction officials to take custody of Grasso at Buffalo International Airport. Prison officials escorted him on a commercial flight to Tulsa via Atlanta, Georgia, and then put him on a prison van to McAlester on January 11, 1995.

Grasso spent his last days on the normal prison schedule, confined for 23 hours a day to his 14 by 18-foot cell in the prison's Death Row (H-unit), which he shared with 49 other condemned men. He was allowed one hour's exercise per day and three showers per week.

=== Final day ===
On the day before his execution, Grasso released four statements to the press. The first, at 3:00 p.m., read, "What we call the beginning is often the end, and to make an end is to make a beginning. The end is where we start from." The second, released at 8:25 p.m., read, "For most of us, there is only the unattended moment, the moment in and out of time. And right action is freedom from the past and future also." The first part of the second statement is a line from T.S. Eliot's "The Dry Salvages".

Shortly before 10:00 p.m., three hours before his execution time, he issued the third statement in the form of a light-hearted poem commemorating his forthcoming dispatch. The poem was entitled "A Visit with Mystery":

Ready, willing, and waiting am I,

Asked for death but could not die.

Each sunrise is one day less,

I'll endure this horrible mess.

When the last sun does sink,

Mr E will serve a goodbye drink.

On the day our paths do cross it won't take much to see it through,

Just a little toxic brew.

The warden will read my last creed,

And the deadly brew will flow.

As the poison drips into my veins,

And from my body life does drain,

I'll know then once and for all

What "last call" means when serving Toxahol.

=== Last meal ===
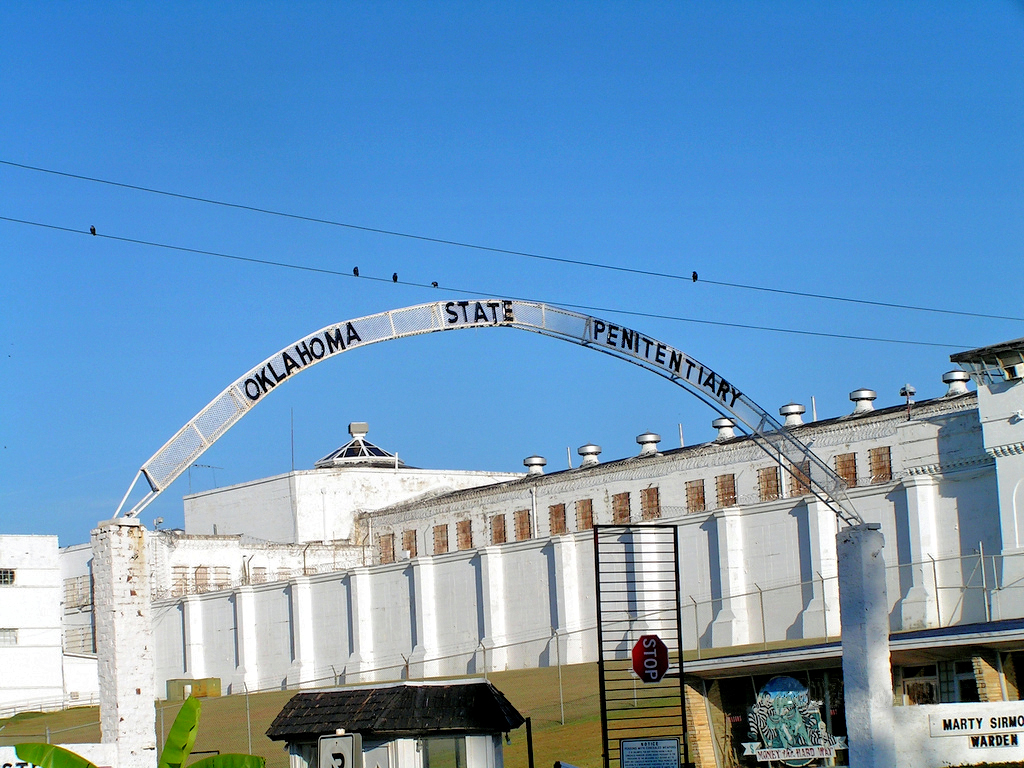
Grasso was executed at Oklahoma State Penitentiary

Grasso's last meal was two dozen steamed mussels, two dozen steamed clams (flavored by a wedge of lemon), a double cheeseburger from Burger King, a half-dozen barbecued spare ribs, two strawberry milkshakes, one-half of a pumpkin pie with whipped cream, diced strawberries, and he requested a can of SpaghettiOs with meatballs though he used his last words to claim that kitchen staff did not honor this request.

Less than an hour before he died, he issued his fourth and final statement, "I did not get my SpaghettiOs, I got spaghetti. I want the press to know this".

=== Execution ===
Just before 1:00 a.m. (EST) on March 20, 1995, Grasso walked from his cell to the execution chamber. The witnesses, including Grasso's lawyers and 12 reporters, sat in an adjoining room. About 1:00 a.m., with Grasso strapped to the gurney, warden Ron Ward picked up a phone in the witness room and spoke to Governor Keating, who granted permission to proceed from his official residence in Oklahoma City. Grasso was pronounced dead at 1:22 a.m.

== See also ==
- Capital punishment in Oklahoma
- Capital punishment in the United States
- List of people executed in Oklahoma
- List of people executed in the United States in 1995
- List of white defendants executed for killing a black victim
- Race and capital punishment in the United States
