= Roger Dale Stafford =

American serial killer (1951–1995)

- Booking Photo 1979
- Born: November 4, 1951; Sheffield, Alabama, U.S.
- Died: July 1, 1995 (aged 43); Oklahoma State Penitentiary, Oklahoma, U.S.
- Conviction: First degree murder (9 counts)
- Penalty: Execution by lethal injection

Details
- Victims: 10–34
- Span of crimes: 1974–1978
- Country: United States
- States: Oklahoma, Alabama, possibly others
- Weapon: Firearm

Roger Dale Stafford (November 4, 1951 – July 1, 1995) was an American convicted serial killer and mass murderer executed for the 1978 murders of the Lorenz family and six employees of a Sirloin Stockade restaurant in Oklahoma. Investigators also confirmed that he killed a fast food employee in Alabama. Stafford never acknowledged his guilt, but Stafford's wife, Verna, implicated him in a total of 34 murders in seven different states.

== Crimes ==
On January 12, 1974, Stafford killed 20-year-old Jimmy Earl Berry, a student at the University of North Alabama, working as an assistant manager at a McDonald's restaurant in Muscle Shoals, Alabama. Berry was shot four times and the perpetrator robbed the restaurant of US$1,390.00. This crime remained unsolved until four years after the incident, when Stafford and his brother Harold were implicated by Stafford's wife, Verna. Stafford was never prosecuted for Berry's murder due to later murder convictions in the state of Oklahoma.

On June 22, 1978, Stafford, aided by his wife Verna and brother Harold, robbed and killed the three-person Lorenz family on the side of Interstate 35 near Purcell, Oklahoma. Verna flagged down the family's car, containing Melvin Lorenz, 38, his wife, Linda, 31, and their son, Richard, 12, who were traveling to North Dakota for the funeral of Melvin Lorenz's mother. After the Lorenz family stopped to help, Stafford then robbed and murdered the entire family.

Three weeks later on July 16, Stafford murdered six employees at a Sirloin Stockade restaurant in Oklahoma City during a robbery. The victims were 17-year-old David Lindsey, 16-year-old David Salsman, 17-year-old Anthony Tew, 15-year-old Terri Horst, 43-year-old Louis Zacarias and 56-year-old Isaac Freeman, all of whom were shot to death.

== Weapons ==
Roger was armed with a Colt Trooper .357 Magnum. Harold was armed with a Taurus Model 82 .38 caliber revolver stolen from a pawn shop in Purcell. Verna equipped herself with an .22-caliber Luger pistol that was also stolen from a family outside of Purcell.

== Capture and trial ==
Six days after the Sirloin Stockade robbery, Harold Stafford died in a motorcycle accident in Tulsa, Oklahoma. Police traced a woman who went to see his body at a local funeral home to Chicago, Illinois, where they found and arrested Verna Stafford. They soon apprehended Roger Stafford as well.

On October 17, 1979, he was convicted of all nine murders, and sentenced to death. His wife Verna was convicted of two counts of second degree murder for the deaths of Linda Lorenz and Terri Horst and was given two life sentences. She also testified against her husband, and divorced him while he was on death row. Stafford married again—twice—while awaiting execution.

== Execution ==
Stafford was executed in Oklahoma by lethal injection on July 1, 1995.

Less than two weeks later, Assistant Attorney General Sandy Howard received a $5 Sirloin Stockade gift certificate with the message "Hey, you got away with it. I am murder [sic] and you help [sic] do it! I am innocent and you know it" written on the back and signed "Roger Dale Stafford 103767". Investigators traced the certificate's origin to a Sirloin Stockade restaurant in El Reno, Oklahoma, and determined that it had been mailed from McAlester, Oklahoma (where Stafford was imprisoned), on July 3, two days after Stafford's execution.

== Verna Stafford parole ==
Verna Stafford was recommended for parole on her first of two life sentences in August 2026. Oklahoma governor Kevin Stitt denied her parole the following month.

== See also ==
- Crime in Oklahoma
- List of people executed in Oklahoma
- List of people executed in the United States in 1995
- List of serial killers by number of victims
- List of serial killers in the United States
- List of white defendants executed for killing a black victim
- Race and capital punishment in the United States
