= 2017 Kissimmee Police Department officer killings =

2017 shooting and murders of two police officers in Kissimmee, Florida

- Sam Howard and Matthew Baxter
- Location: Kissimmee, Florida, United States
- Date: August 18, 2017
- Attack type: Murders by shooting
- Weapon: Gun
- Victims: Sam Howard, 36; Matthew Baxter, 27
- Perpetrator: Everett Glenn Miller
- Verdict: Guilty
- Convictions: First-degree murder (x2)
- Sentence: Death

On August 18, 2017, in Kissimmee, Florida, 45-year-old ex-Marine Everett Glenn Miller (born October 5, 1971) shot and killed both Sergeant Sam Howard and Officer Matthew Baxter of the Kissimmee Police Department during the officers' routine check for suspected drug activities. Miller was arrested and charged with two counts of first-degree murder for the shootings, for which he was found guilty after a trial in 2019, and he was sentenced to death three years later in May 2022. Miller is currently awaiting execution on Florida's death row.

== Murders ==
On August 18, 2017, in Kissimmee, Florida, Sergeant Richard "Sam" Howard and Officer Matthew Baxter of the Kissimmee Police Department were doing a routine check on an area for suspected drug activities. Officer Baxter approached three individuals who were loitering on a street corner, and while he was conversing with them, he was confronted by 45-year-old Everett Glenn Miller, who inserted himself into the conversation. At the request of Miller, Officer Baxter called for his supervisor and shortly after, Sergeant Howard arrived to join Officer Baxter, and the three men were asked to leave. Afterwards, Miller pulled a gun and shot both officers in their heads, before he escaped from the scene.

The two officers were subsequently rushed to the Osceola Regional Medical Center for treatment. However, on the same night, Officer Baxter died at the age of 27 from his wounds, while Sergeant Howard was mortally wounded and remained in grave condition, before he succumbed to his injuries the following day and died at the age of 36. An autopsy report later showed that both men were shot twice in their heads at close range, which resulted in their deaths.

At the time of their deaths, Officer Baxter served for three years in the Kissimmee Police Department and left behind a wife and four children, while Sergeant Howard served for ten years as a police officer in the same department. Sergeant Howard, who was married with a teenage daughter, was previously a member of the United States Army who served two years in Iraq after his graduation from high school, before he joined the police force.

A few hours after murdering the officers, Miller was arrested at a local bar in Kissimmee, where a bar manager called the police after he noted that Miller was behaving suspiciously and resembled the suspected cop shooter from a crime scene footage. Upon their arrival, several sheriff's deputies tackled and subdued Miller just as he tried to draw his weapon from his waistband. The officers also retrieved two handguns from Miller, including a revolver with six spent cartridges. Reportedly, when he was arrested, Miller protested his innocence and shouted, "I didn't do it. I'm a veteran."

== Charges and pre-trial process ==
After his arrest, Ernest Miller was charged with first-degree murder for the killing of Officer Matthew Baxter, and he was also charged with wounding Sergeant Howard, who died sometime after Miller was first charged. On August 20, 2017, the judge denied any bond for Miller in view of his murder charge, and in light of the death of Sergeant Howard, Miller was expected to face additional charges.

Less than 24 hours after Miller's capture, his case was removed from the authority of Orange-Osceola State Attorney Aramis Ayala, and transferred to Ocala State Attorney Brad King. The decision was authorized by Governor Rick Scott because of Ayala's April 2017 declaration that she would not seek the death penalty for accused cop murderer Markeith Loyd and any other future cases prosecuted by her office, and the governor conducted this move to ensure that the victims and their families received the justice they deserved. Under Florida state law, the death penalty was maximum punishment for first-degree murder.

On August 30, 2017, a judge ordered Miller to undergo psychiatric evaluation to determine if he was mentally competent to be put on trial for the double murder. A month later, on September 22, 2017, the judge ruled that Miller was mentally competent to stand trial for the murders of Sergeant Howard and Officer Baxter, and a tentative trial date of January 8, 2018, was set for the accused. The prosecution intended to seek the death penalty in the upcoming trial.

In December 2017, it was updated that due to the backlog of capital cases set to go for trial in 2018, the murder trial of Miller would not be conducted until 2019, and Circuit Judge Greg Tynan agreed to not schedule a trial date. Eventually, Miller's trial was set to begin on August 19, 2019.

== Everett Miller ==
Everett Glenn Miller

Everett Glenn Miller was born on October 5, 1971. He first joined the U.S. Marine Corps in 1989, and served for 21 years until 2010. Military records and his online résumé indicate that he held several positions, including security force guard, warehouse clerk, and imagery analysis specialist, and was stationed in locations including Tampa, Florida, North Carolina, and Okinawa, Japan.

During his military career, Miller performed intelligence analysis in support of Operation Noble Eagle, Operation Enduring Freedom, and Operation Iraqi Freedom while working with U.S. Special Operations Command. He deployed to Iraq in February 2005 as part of Operation Iraqi Freedom and returned for a second tour in 2007. His final assignment was with U.S. Special Operations Command at MacDill Air Force Base near Tampa. Service records cited in contemporary reports indicate that he received more than a dozen medals and military decorations before leaving the Marine Corps in 2010. However, despite his outstanding military service, Miller was convicted of disorderly conduct in 1992 after a court-martial pertaining to a shooting incident at a cookout.

After his military service, Miller lived in the Kissimmee area with his parents. Neighbors described him as friendly and said he had longstanding relationships in the community. Six weeks before the murders, Miller was taken into custody for a mental-health evaluation under Florida's Baker Act, before he was released about a week later. In the days before the August 2017 shootings, investigators said Miller had also made threats toward law enforcement on Facebook and had posted material concerning racial extremist demonstrations and criticism of police.

== Murder trial ==
=== Proceedings and guilty verdict ===
On August 19, 2019, Everett Miller officially stood trial for the murders of Officer Matthew Baxter and Sergeant Sam Howard, and jury selection began on that same day. Ten days later, a 12-member jury and four alternate jurors were selected to hear the case.

During their opening statements on August 30, 2019, the prosecution addressed the court that the murders were the product of Miller's extremist and anti-government beliefs and hatred towards law enforcement officers. On the other hand, the defence argued that the killings were not premeditated and were te result of a scuffle between Miller and the officers, and they further argued that Miller experienced a psychological "downward spiral" of his life since 2013 and had difficulty adjusting to civilian life after leaving military service, and he experienced depression, homelessness, ostracization, anxiety and nightmares. The defence attempted to have the psychiatric evidence admitted in court to support their submissions, but on September 5, 2019, the judge barred the evidence from being presented in court, after accepting the prosecution's rebuttal that the evidence was irrelevant in court unless in cases where the defendant was proven to be legally insane at the time of the offences.

Lewis Peterson, a former Osceola County Jail inmate who interacted with Miller in the infirmary, testified that he heard Miller admitting to the murders, because he hated the two officers and felt that they were harassing people. Timothy Petree, a senior crime laboratory analyst with the Florida Department of Law Enforcement, testified that the DNA tests detected Sergeant Howard's DNA on Miller's car tire and the DNA of Officer Baxter under Miller's fingerprints. Although the judge allowed the prosecution to summon the anti-government extremism expert J. J. MacNab as a witness, they ultimately chose not to call MacNab to give her testimony, but they did present the anti-law enforcement posts from Miller's Facebook page to prove his hostility towards law enforcement officers in light of alleged police brutality. The prosecution rested their case on September 9, 2019.

In their closing submissions, the prosecution argued that the shootings were motivated by Miller's hatred towards the police and he committed the murders in order to "make a statement", and pointed out that the killings were premeditated, and hence they urged the jury to convict Miller of first-degree murder as originally charged. However, the defence asked the jury to find Miller guilty of a lesser offence of second-degree murder for both homicides, because the state failed to conclusively establish which officer was shot first and that the shootings happened while Miller was in an altercation with the officers rather than the result of premeditation.

On September 11, 2019, after two hours of deliberation, the jury found Miller guilty of both counts of first-degree murder. A sentencing trial was first scheduled for November 2019, and the prosecution were seeking the death penalty against Miller.

=== Sentencing phase ===
On November 4, 2019, the sentencing phase of Miller's trial began before the same jury. The prosecution argued for the death penalty on the grounds that the killings were "premeditated, cold and calculated", and his hatred towards law enforcement was also an aggravating factor. The families of Sergeant Howard and Officer Baxter also came to court to present victim impact statements. Among them, Officer Baxter's widow stated that her three daughters were struggling with the pain of losing their father and as the only parent they had, she was unable to help "fill (the) void" left behind.

As for the defence, they argued that Miller should be spared the death sentence and instead face life without parole, because he had an exemplary military career but struggled with psychiatric issues and adapting to civilian life after his discharge. Psychologist Steve Gold testified that Miller was suffering from both depression and PTSD at the time of the murders, and was plagued with lingering remorse for killing people during his military service, and his condition also deteriorated due to homelessness, his break-up from his girlfriend and loss of his job. Aside from this, a month before the penalty phase, the NAACP petitioned to the court to not sentence Miller to death, and the petition contained nearly 300 signatures.

On November 13, 2019, after deliberating for five hours, the jury unanimously voted to impose the death penalty for both murder counts.

On December 13, 2019, Miller and his counsel filed a motion for a new trial and sought to dismiss the jury's death penalty recommendation, claiming that the jurors received improper instructions before they decided on the sentencing decision. A week later, on December 20, 2019, the judge denied the defence's request. A Spencer hearing was held in September 2021 for the defence to make final submissions before the judge could formally impose the sentence.

On May 13, 2022, Miller was formally sentenced to death by Circuit Judge Greg Tynan on both counts of first-degree murder.

== Death row ==
After his sentencing, Everett Miller was transferred to death row at the Union Correctional Institution, where he remains incarcerated as of 2026.

On September 7, 2023, Everett Miller filed a direct appeal to the Florida Supreme Court to challenge his death sentence.

On February 29, 2024, the Florida Supreme Court dismissed Miller's appeal against his death sentence and murder conviction.

== See also ==
- Capital punishment in Florida
- List of death row inmates in the United States § Florida
