= Markeith =

Markeith is an English-language masculine given name, a conflation of the names Mark and Keith, meaning 'warrior' or 'woodland'. It is often found among African Americans. Notable people with the given name include:

- Markeith Ambles (born 1991), American football player
- Markeith Cummings (born 1988), American basketball player
- Markeith Knowlton (born 1983), Canadian football player
- Markeith Loyd (born 1975), American murderer
- Markeith Price (born 1990), American Paralympic athlete
