= Murder of Nancy O'Farrell =

1981 rape and murder of a woman in Ocala, Florida

- Location: Ocala, Florida, United States
- Date: January 16, 1981
- Attack type: Murder by shooting Rape
- Weapon: .25-caliber pistol
- Victims: Nancy O'Farrell, 41
- Verdict: Guilty
- Convictions: First-degree murder
- Sentence: Death
- Convicted: Ian Deco Lightbourne

On January 16, 1981, in Ocala, Florida, 41-year-old Nancy O'Farrell was raped and murdered by Ian Deco Lightbourne (born December 11, 1959), a former employee of her family's farm who broke into her house to commit robbery, before he shot the victim to death to silence her as a witness, and he also stole some of her valuables, including a necklace and some money. Lightbourne was found guilty of first-degree murder and sentenced to death on May 1, 1981. He is currently on death row awaiting execution.

== Murder ==
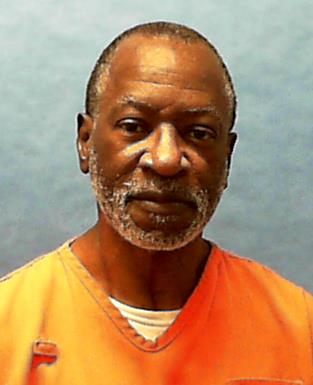
2026 mugshot of Ian Deco Lightbourne

On January 16, 1981, a 41-year-old woman was robbed, raped and murdered inside her home in the southeast region of Ocala, Florida.

On that day, 21-year-old Ian Deco Lightbourne, a Bahamian immigrant, broke into the house of the victim, 41-year-old Nancy O'Farrell, and after gaining entry into the residence, Lightbourne encountered O'Farrell just as she came out of the shower. Lightbourne attacked the woman and raped her, and in spite of O'Farrell's pleas for mercy, Lightbourne shot her once in the head with a .25-caliber pistol, killing her as a result. Lightbourne purportedly shot O'Farrell in order to eliminate her as a witness.

After murdering O'Farrell, Lightbourne stole some valuables from the house, including O'Farrell's necklace and money, and fled the house. The corpse of O'Farrell was discovered by her sister and husband the following day after her murder. An autopsy report later confirmed that O'Farrell died as a result of a single gunshot wound to her head.

Background information showed that O'Farrell's family was a pioneer in Ocala's thoroughbred horse breeding industry, which lasted for over 20 years since it was first established at this point. O'Farrell's father was considered a leader in the state's thoroughbred industry and also active in horse sales in both Ocala and Hialeah. Prior to murdering Nancy O'Farrell, Lightbourne was also a former worker of the O'Farrell family's Ocala Stud Farm.

== Charges ==
The police classified the death of Nancy O'Farrell as murder and conducted their investigations into the killing. However, during the early stages, the police investigations were hindered due to the lack of substantial leads and the inability to identify a possible motive behind the crime.

A week after the killing of O'Farrell, Ian Lightbourne was arrested on January 24, 1981, after the police received a report about a suspicious car, and stopped his vehicle, and he was held on a charge of carrying a concealed weapon before further investigations connected him to the murder of O'Farrell. On February 3, 1981, Lightbourne was charged with the murder of Nancy O'Farrell.

On February 11, 1981, the prosecution expressed their intent to pursue a formal indictment for first-degree murder by a grand jury in an upcoming hearing.

On February 18, 1981, it was confirmed that the trial of Lightbourne was scheduled on April 20, 1981.

On February 19, 1981, Lightbourne was formally indicted by a grand jury for the first-degree murder of O'Farrell.

== Trial and sentence ==
The trial of Ian Lightbourne began on April 20, 1981. Jury selection commenced on the same day and by the following day, a 12-member jury and two alternatives were selected to preside the trial.

During the trial, the prosecution presented evidence to prove that Lightbourne was the killer. Forensic serologist Keith Paul of the Florida Department of Law Enforcement testified that a stain found on O'Farrell's bed contained certain chemical factors that only belonged to 2.7% of the population, including a match to Lightbourne's B-type blood. The tests conducted on the stain also yielded positive detection results of a chemical enzyme called PGM 2-1, and this enzyme was detected inside Lightbourne's body system. Apart from this, two prisoners who previously interacted with Lightbourne at the Marion County Jail testified that Lightbourne had admitted to being present at the house of Nancy O'Farrell on the day of her murder.

On April 25, 1981, after a trial lasting four days, the jury found Lightbourne guilty of first-degree murder and felony murder during the commission of sexual battery and burglary. After Lightbourne's conviction, the trial's penalty phase commenced before the same jury, who were tasked to decide between life imprisonment or the death penalty for Lightbourne.

On May 1, 1981, Lightbourne was formally sentenced to death via the electric chair by Circuit Judge William T. Swigert, after the jury voted for Lightbourne to receive the death penalty.

The trial of Lightbourne was the last case prosecuted by Assistant State Attorneys Al Simmons and Ray Gill, who both resigned soon after the conclusion of Lightbourne's trial and sentencing.

== Appeals ==
=== 1980s ===
On September 15, 1983, the Florida Supreme Court dismissed Ian Lightbourne's appeal against his death sentence.

On February 21, 1984, Lightbourne and six other Florida death row inmates, in separate rulings, lost their appeals to the U.S. Supreme Court.

On May 9, 1985, Lightbourne's first death warrant was signed by Governor Bob Graham, who scheduled his execution date for June 4, 1985. Another inmate, Oscar Mason, was also set to be executed on the same date as Lightbourne. Although the Florida Supreme Court denied Lightbourne's appeal for a stay of execution, U.S. District Judge John H. Moore II granted Lightbourne's federal appeal to delay his execution. As for Mason, his execution was stayed as well by the Florida Supreme Court.

On August 24, 1986, Lighbourne's appeal was turned down by U.S. District Judge John Moore.

On September 19, 1987, the 11th Circuit Court of Appeals rejected Lightbourne's appeal and denied his ineffective counsel allegations.

On October 31, 1988, the U.S. Supreme Court denied Lightbourne's appeal against his death sentence.

Lightbourne's second death warrant was signed by Governor Bob Martinez on January 6, 1989, and he received an execution date of February 1, 1989. However, 15 hours before the execution, Lightbourne was granted a stay of execution by the Florida Supreme Court.

On July 20, 1989, the Florida Supreme Court rejected Lightbourne's appeal.

=== 2000s ===
On January 16, 2003, the Florida Supreme Court denied all appeals from Lightbourne and three other inmates from Florida's death row.

In May 2007, Lightbourne filed a legal challenge against the state's lethal injection protocols and the death penalty, claiming that it constituted as cruel and unusual punishment. The defence referred to the 2006 execution of Ángel Nieves Díaz, which was described to have been botched and some witnesses also recounted that Díaz seemed to experience pain and shortness of breath before his death 34 minutes after the execution procedure began, and a second dose of drugs was administered to carry out his execution. The case was scheduled to be heard before the Florida Supreme Court in October 2007.

In July 2007, Circuit Judge Carven Angel, who first heard the appeal, issued a stay of execution for Lightbourne and directed the Florida Department of Corrections to make adjustments to their lethal injection procedures before they could carry out any death sentences. In August 2007, in the middle of the proceedings, the defence also visited the Florida State Prison (where the state's executions were carried out), and had a look at the execution chamber before they made further submissions for the appeal.

On September 10, 2007, Circuit Judge Carven Angel ruled that Diaz's execution was not botched and therefore overturned the stay of execution in Lightbourne's case, and dismissed his appeal.

On October 31, 2007, the Florida Supreme Court upheld Lightbourne's death sentence and turned down his appeal, denying his claim that lethal injection was unconstitutionally a cruel and unusual punishment.

=== 2010s ===
On April 27, 2012, the Florida Supreme Court rejected the appeals of Lightbourne and two other death row convicts against their respective death sentences.

On March 30, 2017, Lightbourne's defense counsel filed a motion seeking to have their client's death sentence overturned and allow him to be re-sentenced under a new law. That particular law required the jury to sentence a defendant to death solely based on unanimous jury votes, but the law was not retroactively applied to death sentences finalized prior to June 24, 2002, the date of the 2002 landmark decision Ring v. Arizona. The defense revealed that the jury's vote count in favour of Lightbourne's death sentence was not recorded and it was unknown if the jury made a majority or unanimous vote in this case, and hence his sentence should be decided once again based on the need for retroactivity and fairness.

On April 7, 2017, 5th Circuit Judge Robert Hodges refused the motion by Lightbourne to overturn his death sentence, and further denied him re-sentencing, after he found that Lightbourne was ineligible to be re-sentenced under the new law, since the sentence was finalized in 1984 and the defense's claims had no bearing on the validity of his sentence.

On January 26, 2018, the Florida Supreme Court denied Lightbourne's appeal against Hodges's ruling and affirmed his death sentence.

== Death row ==
A February 1986 report showed that Ian Lightbourne was one of five Marion County convicts incarcerated on death row in Florida.

A March 1989 report showed that there were 14 prisoners from Marion, Sumter and Citrus Counties incarcerated on Florida's death row, and Lightbourne was one of them.

As of July 1996, Lightbourne was one of eight Marion County prisoners awaiting execution on Florida's death row.

As of December 2013, Ian Lightbourne was one of seven Marion County prisoners held on Florida's death row. That same month, Michael Shane Bargo Jr. was the eighth Marion County convict to join the state's death row after his conviction for the 2011 murder of Seath Jackson.

As of 2026, Lightbourne remains incarcerated on death row at the Union Correctional Institution.

== See also ==
- Capital punishment in Florida
- List of death row inmates in the United States § Florida
