= Murder of Tiara Pool =

2010 murder of a woman in Jacksonville, Florida

Tiara Nichelle Pool
- Born: September 7, 1988; Florida, U.S.
- Died: July 7, 2010 (aged 21); Jacksonville, Florida, U.S.
- Cause of death: 89 knife wounds
- Spouse: Michael Pool
- Children: Two sons

On July 7, 2010, in Jacksonville, Florida, 21-year-old Tiara Nichelle Pool (September 7, 1988 – July 7, 2010), the wife of a Navy sailor, was murdered by a man named David Kelsey Sparre (born July 7, 1991), with whom she first met through Craigslist. After having sex with Pool, Sparre killed Pool by inflicting an estimated 89 knife wounds on her body and five days later, Pool's corpse was found inside her apartment. Sparre, who was dubbed the "Craigslist killer" due to how he first met Pool, was arrested in South Carolina three weeks after the killing and he was charged with first-degree murder. Sparre was found guilty of murdering Pool and sentenced to death on March 30, 2012. As of 2026, Sparre remains on death row awaiting execution at the Union Correctional Institution.

== Murder ==
On July 7, 2010, in Jacksonville, Florida, a 21-year-old woman was murdered by a man she met through a Craigslist ad.

The victim, Tiara Nichelle Pool, was then married to a United States Navy sailor and had two sons, but at that time, Pool experienced marital problems and her sons were being sent to live with their paternal grandparents. Pool, who wanted male companionship due to the absence of her children and husband (who was deployed at sea for his military duties), posted an ad online through Craigslist, and inside the ad, Pool posted she wanted to meet a white male that fitted the criteria she had set up. Sources described the ad to be "sexually suggestive". Eventually, a 19-year-old man and Georgia resident named David Kelsey Sparre answered to the ad and after a week of messaging, agreed to meet up with Pool.

After visiting his grandmother at St. Vincent's Medical Center, where she underwent heart surgery, Sparre met Pool outside the hospital and returned with her to her apartment. Sparre and Pool had sex inside the apartment and, afterwards, Sparre took a large knife from the kitchen and used it to cut Pool's throat and stab her multiple times. As a result of the attack, Pool died and she had suffered a total of 89 stab wounds on her body. After killing Pool, Sparre stole some of her things – a PlayStation game console, a DVD, and a wireless modem – and left the apartment in Pool's 2003 Chevrolet Malibu car. Sparre later abandoned the car one block north of St. Vincent's Medical Center and also sold Pool's PlayStation to a pawn shop in Georgia. Additionally, Sparre admitted to his then girlfriend that he killed a "black woman" (referring to Pool) and stole her game console from the apartment.

Pool's body was left inside her bedroom for five days, and on July 12, 2010, the corpse was discovered after a friend of Pool came to her apartment to check on her, given that Pool was uncontactable for the next five days after she was murdered. The police later ascertained Pool's identity and put out a public notice for possible witnesses with information needed to investigate her death, which they classified as a homicide.

== Arrest and charges ==
Through police investigations, the police managed to uncover that prior to her death, Pool had posted an ad on Craigslist and identified David Sparre, the man who answered to her ad, as the prime suspect behind her murder. Three weeks later, on July 26, 2010, Sparre was arrested at a family member's home in Charleston, South Carolina.

On July 26, 2010, Sparre was charged with the first-degree murder of Pool.

On November 30, 2010, Sparre was scheduled to stand trial tentatively in May 2011. The prosecution had intended to seek the death penalty for Sparre.

On November 21, 2011, the trial was confirmed to start on November 28, 2011.

== Trial ==
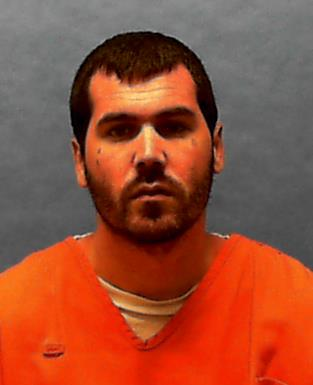
Mugshot of Sparre

On November 28, 2011, David Sparre officially stood trial before a Duval County jury.

During the trial itself, the prosecution, led by Assistant State Attorney Bernie de la Rionda, argued that the murder of Tiara Pool was premeditated because Sparre had knifed the victim 89 times in total, based on the autopsy reports presented in court. The defence, however, submitted that Sparre did not have murder in his mind apart from intending to have sex with Pool, and he "snapped" after finding out that Pool deceived him about who she was and her background. The confession tapes that recorded Sparre's confession were played in court to the jury.

On December 2, 2011, after 25 minutes of deliberation, the jury found Sparre guilty of first-degree murder.

On December 13, 2011, the jury unanimously agreed to impose the death penalty on Sparre. Sparre was one of seven convicts facing a potential death sentence in 2011, a record number in Duval County, where it handed the most death sentences out of all the counties in Florida.

During the sentencing phase, before the judge made the final decision, the court heard about a letter which Sparre wrote to his ex-girlfriend from prison. In the letter, Sparre admitted to murdering Pool, and he further admitted that he wanted to experience the feeling of killing a person and realized that he enjoyed it, and that he hoped to do it again. The defence had unsuccessfully tried to block the letter from being admitted as evidence, and Assistant State Attorney Bernie de la Rionda described the letter as "one of the most graphic" descriptions of a murder he heard of in his 29-year long career as a prosecutor, and emphasized that the letter demonstrated the lack of remorse felt by Sparre and how cold-blooded and ruthless he was.

On March 30, 2012, Circuit Judge Elizabeth Senterfitt formally sentenced Sparre to death for the first-degree murder of Pool. The verdict of death brought relief to Pool's bereaved family, who agreed with the sentence, and Pool's aunt, who was one of the relatives present in court, stated she hoped her niece's sons would understand what happened to their mother. Pool's grandmother also responded to the verdict by telling the press that justice had been served.

== Appeals ==
On December 1, 2013, David Sparre filed an appeal to the Florida Supreme Court against his death sentence. The defence sought to have Sparre removed from death row, stating that despite not putting up his defence, Sparre deserved a proper defence and criticised the trial judge for not considering the mitigating evidence that would help Sparre potentially avoid the death penalty.

On January 22, 2015, the Florida Supreme Court dismissed Sparre's direct appeal against his death sentence.

On March 30, 2018, Sparre petitioned for a new trial in his case.

On August 27, 2019, Sparre appealed for re-sentencing, claiming that he was represented by incompetent counsel during the original trial.

On December 19, 2019, the Florida Supreme Court rejected Sparre's appeal.

On June 13, 2024, Sparre lost his second post-conviction appeal to the Florida Supreme Court.

On December 4, 2025, Sparre's fourth appeal was denied by the Florida Supreme Court.

== Death row ==
After his sentencing in 2012, David Sparre was officially transferred to death row starting from April 2, 2012. By 2019, Sparre was one of 34 inmates on Florida's death row to be condemned for capital offences committed in Duval County.

A 2019 report revealed that Sparre, then 27, was one of the two second-youngest inmates on death row; the other was Michael Bargo Jr., convicted in the Seath Jackson murder case. Both Sparre and Bargo were only one year older than the state’s youngest death row inmate, Benjamin Smiley.

As of 2026, David Sparre remains incarcerated at the Union Correctional Institution.

== Aftermath ==
Sparre was not the only member of his family to face a murder charge. In 2025, a book examining an unsolved 1985 double murder in Georgia revealed that Sparre's father was the alleged perpetrator in the cold case. He was arrested in December 2024 after DNA evidence linked him to the killings—crimes for which another man had previously been wrongfully convicted and later exonerated. Court records from 2017 show that before his arrest, Sparre's father appeared as a witness at his son’s evidentiary hearing in the Tiara Pool murder case.

In 2024, the true crime documentary series Imperfect Murder re-enacted the murder of Tiara Pool and it aired as the seventh episode of the show's third season.

== See also ==
- Capital punishment in Florida
- List of death row inmates in the United States § Florida
- List of solved missing person cases (2010s)
