= Murder of Jennifer Robinson =

1998 mutilation and murder of a woman in Florida

- Location: Santa Rosa County, Florida, United States
- Date: May 7, 1998
- Attack type: Murder by shooting
- Weapon: Lorcin .380 handgun
- Victims: Jennifer Robinson, 18
- Verdict: Guilty
- Convictions: First-degree murder Conspiracy to commit murder Mutilating a human corpse
- Sentence: Death
- Convicted: Jonathan Huey Lawrence; Jeremiah Martel Rodgers

On May 7, 1998, 18-year-old Jennifer Marie Robinson was picked up from her mother's home by two men, Jonathan Huey Lawrence (born April 12, 1975) and Jeremiah Martel Rodgers (born April 19, 1977), who both took her to a secluded area in Santa Rosa County, Florida, where the trio had drinks and had a sexual encounter. After that, the men shot Robinson in the head, killing her, and later disposed of her body in a wooded area, and also cut off her calf muscle, which was kept in the freezer of one of the men. Rodgers and Lawrence, who were also involved in the unrelated murder of the latter's cousin and the shooting of another man, were both arrested, convicted and sentenced to death for murdering Robinson.

== Murder ==
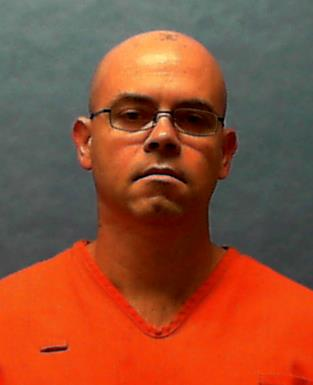
Jeremiah Martel Rodgers

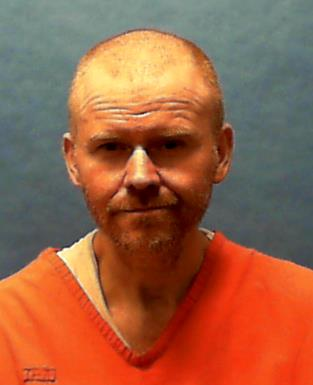
Jonathan Huey Lawrence

On May 7, 1998, in Santa Rosa County, Florida, a 18-year-old high school student was murdered by two men after she went on an outing with them.

On that day, the victim, Jennifer Marie Robinson, was picked up outside her mother's house by 21-year-old Jeremiah Martel Rodgers, and the duo were later joined by 23-year-old Jonathan Huey Lawrence, and the three of them drove in Lawrence's truck to a secluded area in the woods. After arriving at the area, the trio had some alcoholic drinks, and Robinson, who became intoxicated, had sex with both men, first with Rodgers and then with Lawrence. Subsequently, Robinson was shot once in the head by Rodgers, who fired the single shot with Lawrence's Lorcin .380 handgun. Robinson died minutes later from the headshot wound.

After killing Robinson, Lawrence and Rodgers carried her body into the truck, and drove away from the murder scene. The men drove further into the forest, before they left the body buried in a shallow grave. Rodgers took several polaroid pictures of Robinson's body, and one of these pictures featured Lawrence's hand holding Robinson's foot, and they even chopped off her calf muscle from one of her legs. Robinson's corpse was discovered two days later in the shallow grave.

Within days, the police conducted investigations in the case of Robinson's disappearance and death, and linked both Lawrence and Rodgers to the case, and they were eventually arrested. During a search into the home of Lawrence, the police found the missing calf muscle, which was wrapped in a plastic bag, inside the freezer. The police also found written notes that detailed the planning of the murder, polaroid photos picturing the body of Robinson, animal bones, human skull replicas, as well as Ku Klux Klan and satanic literature.

This was not the first time the duo had committed murder. A month prior, on April 9, 1998, the pair committed the murder of 20-year-old Justin Kyle Livingston, who was Lawrence's mentally-disabled cousin. According to Lawrence's confession, Livingston was lured by them into his truck for a ride, under the pretext of smoking marijuana, and after they reached a remote location, Rodgers first stabbed Livingston in the chest twice and attempted to strangle him, before Lawrence inflicted additional knife blows onto Livingston's back, killing him. In another incident on March 29, 1998, both Rodgers and Lawrence shot Leighton "Layton" Smitherman outside his house, after they drove around during the evening, purportedly to find an opportunity to cause trouble and find a person to shoot and kill.

== Trial processes ==
=== Charges ===
Jonathan Lawrence was the first to be arrested for the murder of Jennifer Robinson on May 9, 1998, two days after the killing. Lawrence led the police to the shallow grave where the girl was buried, and around the area, the police also discovered the site where Livingston's body was buried. Livingston's identity was confirmed three days later on May 12, 1998. As for Jeremiah Rodgers, he was placed on the wanted list, and he was caught on May 9, 1998, after he was engaged in a roadside standoff with police in Lake County, Florida.

After their arrests, the pair were first charged with the murder of Robinson, and after the discovery and identification of Livingston's corpse, the men were also investigated for their involvement in Livingston's death.

On May 28, 1998, Rodgers and Lawrence were both charged with attempted murder for the shooting of Leighton Smitherman.

=== Federal prosecution for Livingston murder case ===
Before the pair stood trial on state murder charges for the killing of Robinson, they were first indicted and tried in federal court for the murder of Livingston. Given that the killing took place at Spencer Field, a U.S. Navy helicopter training and practice landing site associated with a nearby military base, the location fell under federal jurisdiction. As a result, the defendants were prosecuted in federal court for Livingston's murder before facing state charges in Robinson's case. If convicted, the pair may potentially be sentenced to death by the federal government.

On March 26, 1999, Lawrence was the first of the duo to plead guilty to the murder of his cousin, in exchange for the prosecution to take the death penalty off the table and withdraw an additional charge of conspiracy against Lawrence as well.

On April 2, 1999, Rodgers pleaded guilty in a separate federal court to the murder of Livingston.

On June 17, 1999, both Rodgers and Lawrence were sentenced to life imprisonment, after the federal prosecution agreed to not seek the death penalty for the pair in light of their guilty pleas.

=== State murder trial for Robinson murder case ===
After their prosecution in the federal courts for Livingston's murder, both Lawrence and Rodgers were set to stand trial in state court for the first-degree murder of Robinson. Under Florida state law, the pair faced a potential death sentence if they were found guilty of killing Robinson.

In early 2000, Lawrence was the first of the duo to plead guilty to the first-degree murder of Robinson. His sentencing trial was carried out before a Santa Rosa County jury in March 2000, and the prosecution sought the death penalty against Lawrence.

On March 31, 2000, the jury recommended the death penalty for Lawrence by a majority split vote of 11–1.

On August 5, 2000, in a separate hearing, a second jury voted 9–3 to impose the death penalty for Rodgers, who likewise pleaded guilty to murdering Robinson.

On August 16, 2000, Lawrence was formally sentenced to death by Circuit Judge Kenneth Bell.

On November 23, 2000, Rodgers was formally sentenced to death by Circuit Judge Paul Rasmussen.

=== Attempted murder trial ===
In November 1999, Lawrence was convicted of the attempted murder of Leighton Smitherman, and sentenced to eight years and eight months in prison.

As for Rodgers, he was convicted of attempted murder in the same case and sentenced to 13 years and five months in prison. However, Rodgers's conviction was later overturned upon appeal, and in June 2004, he pleaded guilty and was sentenced to his original term of 13 years and five months in prison.

== Appeals ==
On March 20, 2003, Jonathan Lawrence's appeal was turned down by the Florida Supreme Court.

On November 24, 2004, the Florida Supreme Court dismissed Jeremiah Rodgers's direct appeal against his death sentence.

On June 29, 2006, the Florida Supreme Court granted a re-sentencing trial for Rodgers and vacated his death sentence.

On June 20, 2007, Rodgers, who waived his right to be sentenced by a jury, was re-sentenced to death by a circuit judge.

On February 5, 2009, Rodgers's appeal was rejected by the Florida Supreme Court.

In 2016, due to a landmark U.S. Supreme Court decision Hurst v. Florida (2016), as well as amendments to the law, the death penalty could only be imposed by unanimous jury votes, and as a result, 15 death row prisoners from Northwest Florida were entitled to the possibility of re-sentencing, and Lawrence and Rodgers were named among these convicts on the list.

On February 8, 2018, the Florida Supreme Court rejected Rodgers's appeal for re-sentencing. In his claims, Rodgers stated that he was diagnosed with gender dysphoria, which was previously not discovered at the time of his trial, and this newly-discovered issue should call for a review of his competency throughout the past court processes. However, the court found that Rodgers had waived his right to be sentenced by a jury back in his previous re-sentencing trial, and that the gender dysphoria issue was not introduced as new evidence but rather to undermine his former actions, and the former reason was why the Florida Supreme Court deemed him ineligible for re-sentencing.

As for Lawrence, he was deemed eligible for re-sentencing and the proceedings commenced in June 2018, and the Santa Rosa County State Attorney's Office announced they would once again seek the death penalty for Lawrence. However, during his re-sentencing trial, Lawrence addressed the judge, expressing that he wanted to have his death sentence reinstated, and he was unwilling to subject the families and friends of his victims to another trial after their two decades of suffering and pain from the loss of their loved ones. Despite Lawrence's wishes, the authorities determined that it was still necessary to review his sentence and a judge would have to decide on whether to re-sentence him to death or life in prison. Prosecutor John Molchan argued that the horrific nature of Robinson's murder justified the imposition of death, which outweighed the mitigating factors, including Lawrence's low IQ and troubled childhood.

On September 12, 2018, Lawrence was once again sentenced to death by Circuit Judge David Rimmer, who agreed with the prosecution relating to the aggravating factors: the murder of Robinson was committed in a cold, calculated and premeditated manner and that the defendant was previously convicted of another capital felony.

On December 3, 2018, Rodgers lost an appeal to the U.S. Supreme Court with regards to the gender dysphoria diagnosis.

On October 29, 2020, the Florida Supreme Court denied Lawrence's appeal against his death sentence.

== Death row ==
After their sentencing, both Jeremiah Rodgers and Jonathan Lawrence were transferred to Union Correctional Institution, the state's designated facility for male death row inmates. A 2019 report showed there was a total of six death row prisoners, including the pair, from Santa Rosa County in Florida.

While on death row, Rodgers transitioned into a female, and is addressed as "Jenna Rodgers" in court documents. Rodgers was documented to be the only transgender woman on Florida's death row. However, the official prison department records still list Rodgers as a male named "Jeremiah Rodgers".

As of February 2016, Rodgers and Lawrence were among the 18 Northwest Florida inmates on the state's death row.

As of July 31, 2025, Lawrence and Rodgers were listed among the 17 death row inmates from Northwest Florida. The number was lowered to 11 after the execution of Edward Zakrzewski, for the murders of his wife and two children; Kayle Bates for the abduction and murder of Janet White; Norman Grim for the rape and murder of Cynthia Campbell; Mark Geralds for the murder of Tressa Pettibone during a burglary; Frank A. Walls for the murder of Ann Peterson during a burglary; and Jesse Guardado for the murder of Jackie Malone during a robbery.

As of 2026, both Lawrence and Rodgers are still incarcerated on death row at the Union Correctional Institution.

== See also ==
- Capital punishment in Florida
- List of death row inmates in the United States § Florida
