= Murder of Vincent Binder =

2010 kidnapping and murder of a university student in Florida

- Vincent Binder
- Location: Tallahassee, Florida, United States
- Date: April 2, 2010
- Attack type: Murder by stabbing
- Weapon: Knife
- Victim: Vincent Binder
- Verdict: Guilty
- Convictions: First-degree murder Kidnapping
- Sentence: Truehill; Death; Johnson; Death, commuted to life without parole Hughes; Life without parole
- Convicted: Quentin Marcus Truehill, 22; Peter Marcus Hughes, 22; Kentrell Feronti Johnson, 33

The Murder of Vincent Binder (1980 – April 2, 2010) occurred on April 2, 2010, in Tallahassee, Florida, after three male detainees escaped from a Louisiana state prison and carried out a violent crime spree across Florida. Binder, a 29-year-old graduate student at Florida State University, was kidnapped by the trio while walking home from a gathering with friends. He was brutally murdered through a combination of stabbing and beating, and his body was later abandoned near St. Augustine.

All three men were arrested and charged with first-degree murder. Quentin Marcus Truehill (born April 16, 1987) and Kentrell Feronti Johnson (born October 4, 1976) were tried, convicted, and sentenced to death, while Peter Marcus Hughes (born October 31, 1987) reached a plea agreement and received a sentence of life imprisonment without the possibility of parole. However, in 2018, Johnson's death sentence was commuted to life without parole on appeal, leaving Truehill as the only perpetrator who remains on death row for Binder's murder.

== Background and murder ==
On March 30, 2010, three inmates – 22-year-old Quentin Marcus Truehill, 22-year-old Peter Marcus Hughes and 33-year-old Kentrell Feronti Johnson – escaped from the custody of Avoyelles Parish Sherriff's Office in Louisiana after they held a knife to a corrections officer's throat. At the time of their escape, Truehill was serving a jail term of 30 years for manslaughter and armed robbery; Hughes was serving 4 years for unlawful entry into an inhabited dwelling; and Johnson was serving 10 years for armed robbery and a parole violation.

After breaking out of jail, the trio first stole a black Chevrolet truck with tools, a knife, and a machete inside, and also stole a woman's purse outside a restaurant in Marksville, Louisiana. After which, they would flee to Florida, where they would embark on a crime spree, which included several robberies across the state and the murder of a student in St. Johns County, Florida. In one of these robberies, on April 1, 2010, Brenda Jo Brown was assaulted and robbed at one of the apartments where she worked as a housekeeper in Pensacola, while in the evening of April 2, 2010, the trio committed two more robberies in Tallahassee, first robbing a man in an apartment complex's car park and later robbed two women behind a local pharmacy.

The abduction and murder of the student, 29-year-old Vincent Binder, occurred that same evening after the trio committed these two robberies. Binder, who was a graduate student of Florida State University, was last seen walking back home after he attended a dinner and gathering with his friends. The disappearance of Binder was first noticed by one of his friends, who could not reach him by phone or text message, and he also did not show up to teach in his classes, and eventually, on April 8, 2010, Binder was reported missing.

According to court and media sources, Binder was abducted while on his way back to his apartment in Tallahassee, and he was forced into the stolen truck. After the kidnapping, Binder was being hacked and stabbed multiple times by his abductors, and as a result of the brutal attack, Binder died. His body was abandoned near St. Augustine. According to an autopsy report, there were four stab wounds on Binder's back and blunt-force injuries to his left side of his head, which penetrated the cranium, and also ten injuries inflicted by hacking at the back of Binder's head, which caused a four-inch hole and fractures on the skull. Apart from these wounds, Binder also sustained multiple defensive wounds on his arms and rib fractures.

Ten days after the murder, on April 12, 2010, all the three fugitives were arrested at a parking lot of a hotel, after the investigations revealed that the trio tried to use a card stolen from Binder at a store. On April 28, 2010, the police managed to find the body of Binder at the location where it was supposedly disposed of, after Johnson told the investigators where they could find the body. The police eventually identified and confirmed the body to be that of Binder's.

== Charges and pre-trial developments ==
After their arrests, the trio were charged with the kidnapping of Vincent Binder after they were linked to his disappearance. The trio were later charged with murder after the death of Binder.

On May 11, 2010, a St Johns County grand jury indicted all the three men for charges of kidnapping and first-degree murder.

On June 4, 2010, State Attorney R.J. Larizza announced that he would seek the death penalty for the trio.

The trial dates of the trio were tentatively set in the summer of 2013. However, in August 2013, the trials were postponed to February 2014, and eventually, in January 2014, it was granted that the trio shall be tried separately for the murder of Binder.

== Trials of the murderers ==
=== Quentin Truehill ===
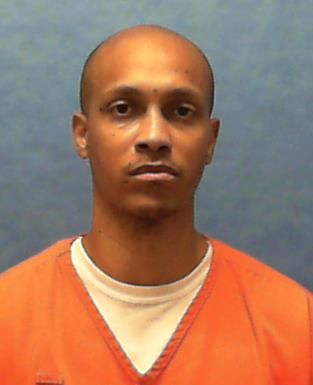
Quentin Truehill

On February 3, 2014, Quentin Truehill became the first person to stand trial for the murder of Vincent Binder, and jury selection began that same day. Opening statements were first submitted on February 10, 2014.

On February 18, 2014, the jury found Truehill guilty of first degree murder and kidnapping.

On March 7, 2014, by a unanimous decision, the jury recommended the death penalty for Truehill.

On May 16, 2014, Judge Raul Zambrano formally sentenced Truehill to death for the murder of Binder.

=== Kentrell Johnson ===
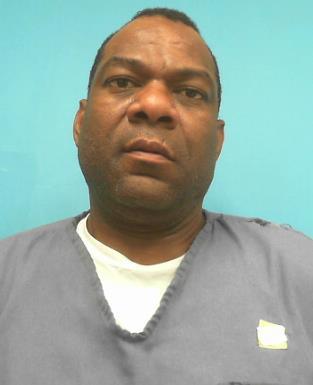
Kentrell Johnson

On June 14, 2014, Kentrell Johnson became the second person to claim trial for the murder of Binder before a St. Johns County jury.

On June 19, 2014, the jury found Johnson guilty of first-degree premeditated murder, felony murder and kidnapping on all counts.

On June 26, 2014, the 12-member jury unanimously agreed to impose the death penalty in Johnson's case.

On September 16, 2014, Johnson was formally sentenced to death by St. Johns County Circuit Court Judge Raul Zambrano.

=== Peter Hughes ===
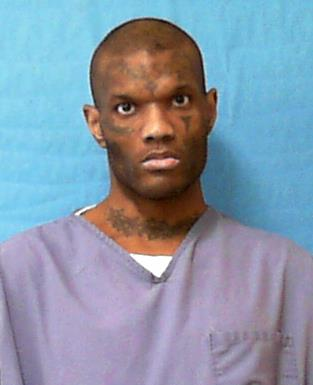
Peter Hughes

On June 26, 2014, the same day the jury sentenced Johnson to death, Peter Hughes, the last member of the trio, entered into a plea agreement with prosecutors and pleaded guilty to the first-degree murder of Binder. In exchange, the death penalty was taken off the table, and Hughes was thus sentenced to life imprisonment without the possibility of parole.

According to Hughes's defence counsel, Hughes was certified to have an intellectual disability through pre-trial medical examinations, on this basis the defense and prosecution ultimately reached a plea agreement. Hughes's lawyer explained that if Hughes was sentenced to death, the issue of his intellectual disability would likely be litigated for years. Hughes therefore agreed to accept a life term and stated that he did not want to subject the victim's family to a third murder trial.

As of 2026, Hughes is incarcerated at the Santa Rosa Correctional Institution.

== Commutation of Johnson's death sentence ==
On November 4, 2015, Kentrell Johnson appealed to the Florida Supreme Court against his death sentence. Johnson's lawyers argued that prior to his trial, the state attorney's office in Tallahassee made an agreement to not seek the death penalty against Johnson on the condition that he provide assistance to locate the body of the victim Vincent Binder, and the state's decision to continue pursue it and ultimately impose it was a violation of Johnson's constitutional rights. They also argued that there was no reason for St. Johns County prosecutors to charge Johnson for the same offence when he already was charged by the Leon County prosecutors in Tallahassee. The prosecution, however, stated that the agreement itself was non-binding and there was no formal agreement, and the decision from one state attorney's office should not prohibit another from requesting capital punishment.

On March 15, 2018, the Florida Supreme Court unanimously allowed the appeal of Johnson, overturned his death sentence and ordered a re-sentencing trial for Johnson. The court found that the agreement should bar the state from seeking the death penalty, and while the agreement was decided upon by one county and Johnson himself stood trial in another county, the state was obligated to follow the agreement after he fulfilled his end of the deal, regardless of whichever county the trial took place in.

On April 17, 2018, Circuit Judge Raul Zambrano re-sentenced Johnson to life without parole for the murder of Vincent Binder, thus sparing him the death sentence for the offence.

As of 2026, Johnson is serving his life sentence at the Graceville Correctional Facility.

== Truehill's appeals ==
After his sentencing, Quentin Truehill was held on death row at the Union Correctional Institution since then. As of 2018, Truehill was one of five death row inmates in Florida convicted of murders committed within St. Johns County.

On February 23, 2017, the Florida Supreme Court dismissed Truehill's direct appeal against the death sentence.

On October 16, 2017, Truehill's appeal was denied by the U.S. Supreme Court.

On September 29, 2022, the Florida Supreme Court rejected another appeal from Truehill.

As of 2026, Quentin Truehill remains incarcerated on death row at the Union Correctional Institution.

== See also ==
- Capital punishment in Florida
- List of death row inmates in the United States § Florida
