= Edward Dean Kennedy =

American serial killer (1945–1992)

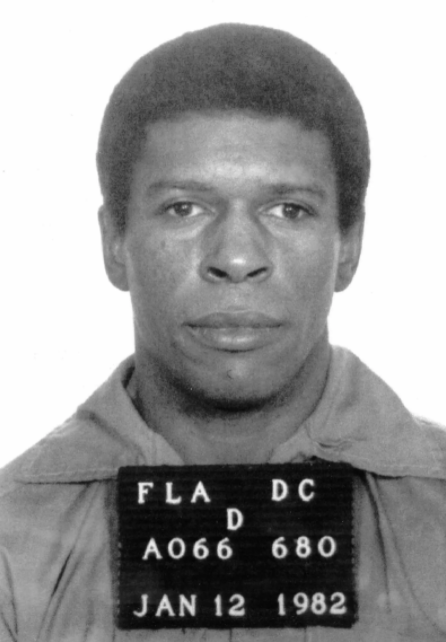
- Born: May 25, 1945; Boston, Massachusetts, United States
- Died: July 21, 1992 (aged 47); Florida State Prison, Florida, U.S.
- Other name: "Sonny"
- Status: Executed by electric chair
- Conviction: First degree murder (3 counts)
- Penalty: Death

Details
- Victims: 3
- Date: May 19, 1978; April 11, 1981
- Country: United States
- State: Florida

Edward Dean Kennedy (May 25, 1945 – July 21, 1992) was an American convict who was executed for the murders of Florida state trooper Robert McDermon and McDermon's cousin Floyd Cone. (Note: One source lists his name as "Floyd Crane".) The killings occurred just hours after Kennedy escaped from the Union Correctional Institution, where he was serving a life sentence for murder. Kennedy was sentenced to death for the murders of McDermon and Cone and was executed by the electric chair.

== Background ==
Kennedy was born in Boston, Massachusetts, on May 25, 1945. He was a self-taught saxophonist.

Prior to his 1978 arrest, Kennedy was sentenced to spend time in the state prison in Walpole, Massachusetts, for robbery.

== Crimes ==
On May 19, 1978, Kennedy, along with a man named Oliver Cochran, murdered 33-year-old Robert Brown, a motel clerk, during a robbery in Miami. Both were apprehended and tried, but Kennedy was able to convince the judge not to give him a death sentence by stating he wanted to do something good for society. Kennedy and Cochran were ultimately sentenced to life imprisonment. Kennedy was housed at the Union Correctional Institution.

On April 11, 1981, Kennedy, along with two other inmates, escaped from the prison. The two other escapees were quickly recaptured, while Kennedy remained at large. During this time, Kennedy broke into a home where he stole multiple weapons and changed clothes. While Kennedy was in the house, the home's owner, Floyd Cone, and Cone's cousin, Robert C. McDermon, a Florida Highway Trooper, entered the home. Kennedy shot and killed both men before fleeing, running to another house on the same block. Kennedy held the second homeowners hostage while police and other authorities surrounded the area. Kennedy exclaimed he wanted television news stations covering the events as he let the occupants free. He was arrested and taken into custody not long after.

== Trial ==
Kennedy was tried on two counts of first degree murder, and was ultimately convicted and sentenced to death. In 1984, Kennedy attempted to appeal his sentence, arguing his confession should not have been admissible in court, citing that the state did not prove he had knowingly been informed of his right to remain silent. Other arguments, including the excusing of a venireman, the admissibility of photographic evidence, and the propriety of certain jury instructions and of the prosecutor's closing argument, were presented. In the end, the appeal was dismissed and Kennedy's death sentence was upheld.

== Execution ==
Kennedy was scheduled to die on February 11, 1986, at 7 a.m. along with convicted killer Paul B. Johnson, who was condemned for killing a deputy sheriff. However, a high court granted a stay of execution for Kennedy.

The decision to execute Kennedy was argued upon, and on the day of his new scheduled execution, about a half-dozen people protested outside the prison. On July 21, 1992, after the supreme court refused a stay of execution, Kennedy was executed by the electric chair. His execution was the 29th in Florida since capital punishment was reinstated in the United States.
