= Nelson Serrano =

American convicted murderer (1938–2024)

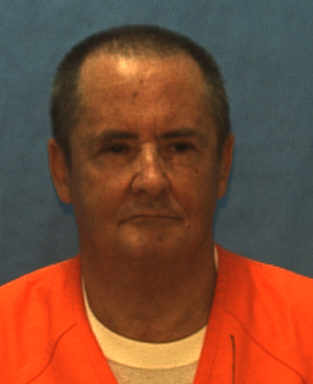
- Mug shot of Serrano
- Born: September 15, 1938; Quito, Ecuador
- Died: August 8, 2024 (aged 85); Jacksonville, Florida, U.S.
- Occupation: Businessman
- Children: Francisco
- Status: Deceased
- Conviction: First degree murder (4 counts)
- Penalty: Death

Nelson Iván Serrano Sáenz (September 15, 1938 – August 8, 2024) was an Ecuadorian-American businessman who was convicted of murdering Frank Dosso, Diane Patisso, George Patisso, and George Gonsalves in Bartow, Florida, United States, on December 3, 1997. The jury pronounced him guilty and recommended the death penalty for Serrano in October 2006 after he was convicted of the murders. On June 26, 2007, Judge Susan Roberts sentenced him to death by lethal injection for each of these crimes. Serrano's conviction is controversial, and his culpability has been disputed. He died of natural causes in 2024.

== Background ==
On December 3, 1997, Frank Dosso, Diane Patisso, George Patisso, and George Gonsalves were found shot execution-style at the Erie Manufacturing plant in Bartow. Diane Patisso, a young state prosecutor, had gone to pick up her brother Frank and her husband George at the factory that evening, and prosecutors say she was murdered to prevent her from identifying the killer.

Dosso and Gonsalves accused Serrano of graft, then theft, but investigators, including the FBI, dismissed these accusations. Although there was no physical evidence at the scene to link Nelson Serrano to the crime, relatives of the victims immediately suspected Nelson Serrano, a former partner and CEO of the business. They had been in a bitter dispute with the others over his partners' removal of $1 million without his knowledge. However, millions of dollars were removed from corporate bank accounts after Serrano left the company, and only Dosso and Gonsalves had access to them. The money's whereabouts were never presented during the trial and remain unknown.

During the summer of 1997, Nelson Serrano opened a separate business checking account with a different bank. He deposited two checks totaling over $200,000 from Erie's sister company Garment Conveyor Systems, as requested by corporate counsel to keep monies safe from Dosso and Gonsalves. There were disagreements about the distribution of assets and accusations by Serrano that there were two sets of books. Serrano instituted a civil suit against his partners. Ultimately, Serrano was removed as president by a vote of the other two partners, and Serrano left the companies. After that, the locks were changed on the building. Shortly before Serrano was ousted as CEO, Phil Dosso and George Gonsalves had fired Serrano's son, Francisco. Prosecutors said Serrano was angry because Gonsalves and Felice "Phil" Dosso, the third partner in the business, had ousted him and his son from both companies.

Numerous Erie employees testified to the strained relations between Serrano and the other two partners, particularly Serrano's dislike of Gonsalves. Serrano made statements indicating that he wished Gonsalves were deceased. Another Erie employee testified that, weeks before the murders, a plant employee came to work with a gun and threatened to kill George. He was calmed down and sent home.

Authorities said both Serrano men had the motive to commit the murders, but Francisco Serrano provided an alibi. His father told authorities he was in an Atlanta hotel room with a migraine headache all day, so no one saw him or talked to him. But, almost three years later, law enforcement agents found his fingerprint on a parking garage receipt at Orlando International Airport dated 3:49 p.m. on Dec. 3, about two hours before the slayings occurred. Prosecutors felt that piece of evidence broke his alibi. However, the state's fingerprint expert stated the fingerprint was suspicious because of how it was found, because the print was from Serrano's right hand (a driver is more likely to take the ticket from the machine with his left hand) and because there were no other prints or smudges on the ticket.

In a court hearing in September 2013, prosecutors admitted to withholding from defense counsel the testimony of the only eyewitness to the murder scene, John Purvis. Purvis stated that he witnessed an Asian young man ("one of those slanty-eyed people") between the ages of 25 and 30 outside of the main entrance to Erie and a young Latin man in the building looking out of the glass at or around the time investigators estimate the murders occurred. The victims were found in an office about 50 feet from the main entrance, suggesting that others were also involved. He also stated that a Lincoln or Cadillac was parked outside. The new attorneys for Serrano, headed by attorney Roy Black had also uncovered that prosecutors withheld from trial defense attorneys the fact that an extradition process had already begun one week before Serrano's illegal deportation and state attorney Paul Wallace traveled to Ecuador, misled government officials to seek deportation obstructing the federal process of extradition. Paul Wallace, as co-prosecutor during the trial, withheld this information from the court and jury. Nelson's defense discovered that the Florida prosecutor and police concealed a third weapon used in the crime, a rifle for exclusive military use.

Serrano claimed that he was on a business trip, 500 miles away in Atlanta, when the killings occurred. However, the prosecutors convinced the 12-member trial jury that Serrano had flown by airliner to Florida under assumed names to commit the premeditated murders. Then he had quickly flown back to Atlanta from a different major airport to attempt to establish an alibi by appearing on the security video cameras of his hotel. Prosecutors stated that Serrano had tricked his nephew into providing him with a rental car (under a pseudonym) to reach the other airport. Although Bartow is midway between the major airports in Tampa and Orlando, evidence was not shown to prove this trip positively and that murders could be possible during rush hour traffic. Prosecutors and investigators did not find any videos from either airport showing Serrano.

Florida vs. Serrano: Timeline of the crime December 3, 1997
12:21 p.m.	Nelson Serrano is captured on La Quinta Hotel's surveillance video in Atlanta
1:36 p.m.	Allegedly using his son's name, Juan Agacio, Serrano boards Delta Flight 1807 bound for Orlando
3:05 p.m.	Delta Flight 1807 lands in Orlando
3:49 p.m.	Parking garage ticket from Orlando International Airport with Serrano's fingerprint is stamped
5:00 p.m.	Maria Dosso calls her husband, Frank Dosso, son of Serrano's former partner Phil Dosso, at Erie Manufacturing and Garment Conveyor Systems in Bartow.
5:05 p.m.	Erie employee Karen Stevens clocks out along with David Catalan.
5:20 p.m.	Diane Patisso leaves Bartow courthouse and heads to the office, approximately five minutes away.
5:45 p.m.	Maria Dosso, expecting her husband to arrive at 5:30, calls the office.
5:50 to 6:15 p.m.	Witness John Purvis, working at a nearby company, notices a man dressed in a suit standing on the sidewalk outside Erie Manufacturing. Purvis notes the man did not appear to have a car.
7:28 p.m.	Passenger John White, an alias allegedly used by Serrano, checks in at Tampa International Airport.
7:34 p.m.	Phil Dosso calls 911 to report discovering the dead bodies of his son, Frank Dosso, his daughter, Diane Patisso, her husband, George Patisso, and his other business partner, George Gonsalves
7:36 p.m.	First police officer arrives at the scene
8:20 p.m.	Flight leaves Tampa bound for Atlanta
9:49 p.m.	Flight arrives in Atlanta
10:17 p.m.	Serrano is captured on the surveillance video La Quinta Hotel in Atlanta

During the trial, Serrano's lawyers fought for a mistrial, claiming that Serrano was illegally deported from Ecuador to the United States. Serrano was an Ecuadorian citizen by birth and in 1971 became a naturalized American citizen. In 1971, he renounced his Ecuadorian citizenship to obtain his United States citizenship. Serrano was kidnapped in Ecuador by Florida-hired off-duty police officers and then, according to the Ecuadorian government and the Inter-American Commission on Human Rights (a division of the Organization of American States), illegally deported back to Florida for his murder trial. Documents concerning this issue were presented during the trial and were confirmed by the Ecuadorian Ombudsman through his testimony. Judge Roberts, unaware that an extradition process was started and thwarted by state attorney Wallace, denied the defense motion, finding no cause to dismiss the case.

Ecuadorian officials, seeking his return to that country, claimed Serrano had been beaten and kept in a dog kennel at the airport in Quito after his arrest in Ecuador. Police say Serrano suffered a minor fall injury as he boarded the airliner. An American Airlines flight attendant who witnessed Serrano bleeding from the head with several bruises refused entry to the Florida officials, but the flight Captain allowed them to board.

Judge Roberts denied a defense motion for a change of venue, although one of the victims, Diane Dosso Patisso, was an Assistant State Attorney for Polk County. The judge hid this information from the jury.

The families of the victims have set up a memorial foundation in their honor.

Serrano's son, who had also worked at the Bartow plant, claimed that his father was innocent and has set up a web site in defense of his father.

Serrano was on death row at a male-only maximum security prison facility at the Union Correctional Institution in Raiford, Florida.

== Death ==
His son, Francisco Serrano, announced in July 2024 that Nelson suffered from a brain tumor that kept him bedridden and on the verge of unconsciousness. He finally died after several days, on the night of August 7, 2024, at the Jacksonville Hospital, in Florida, United States, of a heart attack, this was confirmed by Óscar Vela, his lawyer, on his X account the next day, where he expressed that he was finally free and that all that remained was to fight for his innocence.

== See also ==
- List of death row inmates in the United States
