= Leon Davis Jr. =

American spree killer on death row

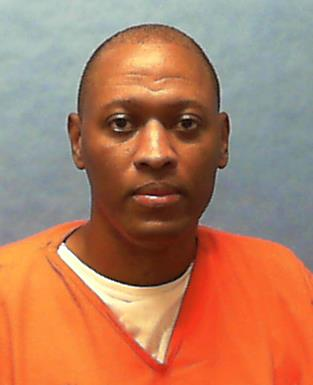
- Born: December 14, 1977 (age 48); Lake Wales, Florida, U.S.
- Convictions: First degree murder (5 counts); Attempted first degree murder (2 counts); Armed robbery Attempted armed robbery Arson; Grand theft (6 counts)
- Penalty: Death

Details
- Victims: 5 (including an unborn child)
- Span of crimes: December 7 – December 13, 2007
- Country: United States
- State: Florida
- Weapon: .38 Dan Wesson Firearms revolver
- Date apprehended: December 14, 2007
- Imprisoned at: Union Correctional Institution

Leon Davis Jr. (born December 14, 1977) is an American spree killer and arsonist who committed two double homicides within a week in Polk County, Florida, in December 2007. He was sentenced to death in two separate trials and is currently awaiting execution at Union Correctional Institution.

== Early life ==
Davis was born on December 14, 1977, in Lake Wales, Florida. Early friends of Davis described him as someone who was funny, enjoyed four-wheeling, and an avid listener of country music. Davis was also regarded as a good athlete due to him being 6 foot 5 and a high school basketball player. Despite this, Davis often got into fights, which led to police detaining him, though Davis did not get charged with any crime.

In 2002, Davis and his girlfriend were arrested for shoplifting about $50 of products out of Walmart. In July 2006, Davis purchased a home that left him over $196,000 in debt. It was later discovered that in January 2007, Davis wrote on his blog, "I have hurt people in the past and I'm sorry for it! So 2007 and on I will live my life the right way, and that's keeping it real with my family and friends!" The following month, Davis married his longtime girlfriend Victoria Campo.

== Murders ==
=== December 7, 2007 ===
On December 7, 2007, Davis entered a gas station alongside Interstate 4 in Polk County, where 33-year-old Pravinkumar Patel and 55-year-old Dashrath Patel were working. Once inside, Davis brandished his gun and shot both men in close-range execution-style shootings, ultimately killing both. Afterwards he did not steal any money, but fled the scene. The murders were caught on camera; however, Davis was never identified in those video tapes and he was not questioned in the days afterward.

=== December 13, 2007 ===
On December 13, 2007, Davis entered the Headley Nationwide Insurance office in Lake Wales, which was run by 26-year-old Yvonne Bustamante, whom Davis knew, and 23-year-old Juanita "Jane" Luciano, who was 5½ months pregnant with a baby boy whom she was going to name Michael. Once inside, Davis forced both into the backroom where he forced them to unlock the safe, which contained around $900. Next, he bound both to chairs with duct tape, doused both with gasoline, and lit them ablaze. Reportedly, the fire burned through the tape, temporarily setting the women free, but by the time police arrived, both were in critical condition.

Bustamante and Luciano had to be hospitalized, but Bustamante died from her injuries on December 18. Luciano, too succumbed to her injuries on January 8, along with her unborn child. Before she died, she positively identified Davis as the assailant. Afterward, Davis became one of Florida's most wanted suspects, but it was short-lived as he turned himself in on December 14, Davis' 30th birthday. Besides the identification, Davis was also tied to the crime scene based on bullets and ballistics left at the scene. The bullets and ballistics also linked Davis to the previous murders on December 7. Davis' murders were described as the worst killing spree in Polk County history.

== Trials and imprisonment ==
The first trial began in early 2010. During the trial, the prosecution brought forward a witness who was an emergency technician at the time. The EMT testified that one of the victims, Bustamante, told him shortly before she died that Leon Davis was her attacker. However, because this story could not be confirmed because the victim was dead, it became impossible for the defense to cross-examine. Due to this, the judge announced a mistrial. After the mistrial was announced, Richard Bustamante, the father of victim Yvonne Bustamante, attempted to attack Davis but was ultimately apprehended. At the same time, Bustamante's mother, Ebelia Rodriguez, threw her purse at Davis, hitting his lawyer Andrea Norgard. Richard was not charged with the attack, but he was prohibited from being present at any future court proceedings.

A new trial was brought forward in 2011. At the end of the trial, Davis was found guilty, and a jury voted for him to be sentenced to death on April 29, 2011, for the three murders. He was also given an additional life sentence for killing Luciano's unborn child. Davis was due to stand on the first day of his second trial on April 16, 2012. However, due to issues with Davis's lawyers and the prosecutors, the second trial would be postponed until September 10. The second trial began in September, and at the end, the court sentenced Davis to death a second time. In 2016, Davis attempted to appeal, but his sentences were upheld by the Florida Supreme Court.

== See also ==
- List of death row inmates in the United States
