= Ray Lamar Johnston =

American convicted murderer (born 1954)

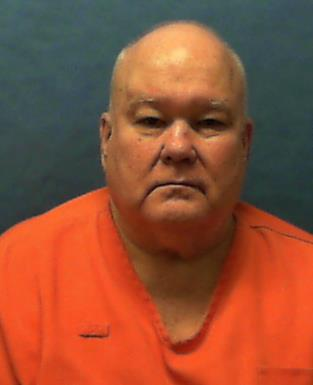
- 2026 mugshot of Johnston
- Born: October 24, 1954 (age 72); Coweta County, Georgia, U.S.
- Status: Incarcerated on death row
- Convictions: First degree murder (x2); Kidnapping; Robbery; Sexual battery Burglary with assault
- Penalty: Coryell murder: Death; Nugent murder: Death, commuted to life imprisonment

Details
- Victims: 2
- Date: February 7 – August 19, 1997
- Country: United States
- State: Florida
- Location: Tampa, Florida
- Date apprehended: August 21, 1997
- Imprisoned at: Union Correctional Institution

Ray Lamar Johnston (born October 24, 1954) is an American convicted murderer on death row in Florida. On February 7, and August 19, 1997, respectively, Johnston separately committed the murders of two women: Janice Nugent and LeAnne Coryell. Johnston was arrested two days after he kidnapped, raped and killed Coryell, who was his neighbor, and he was subsequently linked to the killing of Nugent, whose body was found in her bathtub after her murder.

Johnston was charged with murdering the two women, and he was convicted and sentenced to death for both murders after separate trials, although his death sentence for the killing of Nugent was commuted to life imprisonment in 2021. Johnston currently remains on death row awaiting execution for the murder of Coryell.

== Background ==
Raymond "Ray" Lamar Johnston was born on October 24, 1954, in Coweta County, Georgia. His mother worked as an interior designer, his father was the owner of an auto parts business, and his grandfather was a county commissioner. The family later settled in Vestavia Hills, Alabama. Although his mother described his upbringing as loving and relatively ordinary, Johnston reportedly exhibited behavioral problems from an early age, such as strangling a cat at age two and disciplinary issues in elementary school, leading his parents to enroll him in military boarding schools in hopes that a more structured environment would improve his conduct. However, these issues persisted, and Johnston eventually joined the U.S. Air Force at one point. Johnston married for the first time at age 19, but the marriage ended after only a few years.

In the early 1970s, he began accumulating a criminal record involving offenses against women. Some early cases did not result in convictions, but for the others, he served time for intimidation charges in Georgia, before he was convicted of robbery and sexual assault charges in Alabama, where he was sentenced to ten years' imprisonment before he was released on parole in 1986 halfway through his sentence. Johnston married a female volunteer he met at the Christian prison ministry and found a stable job as a salesman and the couple settled in Jacksonville, Florida.

However, this stability lasted until 1988, when he was arrested in Florida for two separate cases of kidnapping and burglary against women, and he served eight years out of a 18-year prison sentence. His second marriage also broke down as a result. According to Johnston's second ex-wife, she still loved her ex-husband, because throughout their two-year marriage, Johnston had been a caring husband who often did the chores (partly due to her arthritis) and treated her two daughters well, and the divorce was due to the uncertainty of Johnston's release and she herself returned to Alabama, and her father was dying of cancer at that time.

After his release, Johnston re-settled in Brandon, Florida, where he established a career in telecommunication sales. Johnston remarried a third time with a woman he met through a dating service, but one month into the marriage, his third wife filed a domestic violence injunction against Johnston, and the couple separated for a year before they formally divorced on August 8, 1997. Apart from this, Johnston formed friendships and romantic relationships with several women. Many initially viewed him as thoughtful, attentive, and dependable. Over time, however, some described him as increasingly controlling and possessive. At one point, Johnston was suspected of attacking a woman while armed with a paring knife and wearing pantyhose on his face, but was not charged due to insufficient evidence. By mid-1997, Johnston lost his job after his criminal record became known, filed for bankruptcy, and faced financial and housing difficulties.

== Murders ==
=== Janice Nugent ===
On February 7, 1997, Johnston killed his first victim, 47-year-old Janice Nugent, who was a divorcee working as an accountant and licensed massage therapist.

Nugent was discovered dead in her bathtub by her son-in-law, and the body showed signs of beating and strangulation. An autopsy report by Dr. Julia Martin certified that the cause of death was manual strangulation, and it was supported by the discovery of extensive bruises on Nugent's neck and shoulder area. The presence of defensive bruises on her arms and hands, and fingernail injuries on her nose showed that Nugent attempted to resist her attacker. There were pattern-type blunt force injuries on her buttocks, which showed that Nugent was beaten by a belt or vacuum cleaner hose. It was theorized that Nugent died before she was placed in the bathtub.

The murder was left unsolved for six months before Johnston was identified as the killer after his arrest for another woman's murder, because testing results showed that a mixture stain on the bedsheet of Nugent contained the DNA profile of Johnston, and Johnston's fingerprint was found on the shower knob in Nugent's bathroom. Evidence showed that Johnston dated Nugent after they first met at a restaurant he frequented, and they both danced together a few times and went out on one dinner date before her murder.

Based on the evidence, it was believed that Johnston had attacked, assaulted and strangled Nugent in her apartment on the night of February 7, 1997, and while Johnston admitted that he went there on the night Nugent was killed, he denied that he killed her and claimed he stayed there for an hour or so before he left.

=== LeAnne Coryell ===
On August 19, 1997, Johnston committed the kidnapping, rape and murder of 30-year-old LeAnne Coryell, who was a dental assistant and single mother.

On that night, Coryell returned home to her apartment in Tampa, Florida, and she was unloading her groceries from her car at the parking lot when she was kidnapped by Johnston, who lived in the same apartment building as her. Johnston forcibly took her outside a nearby church, where he violently raped and beaten the woman before he strangled her to death. Soon after her murder, the body of Coryell was discovered floating in a river near a church by a man who was walking his dog home. The police also found her clothes scattered at an embankment. Her car and some of her groceries were also found at the parking lot where the abduction took place.

An autopsy report by Dr. Russell Vega confirmed that the cause of death was manual strangulation, which were corroborated by the extensive bruising on the neck (including the external and internal neck tissues). Lacerations on the chin and lip were found to be caused by blunt impact, while bruises on Coryell's buttocks showed that she had been beaten with her belt. Additionally, Coryell suffered both internal and external injuries to her vaginal area, which showed that Johnston had raped her, and vertical scrapes on the victim's back confirmed that Johnston dragged her to the river.

At the time of her death, Coryell, whose birth name was LeAnne Lynn Morris, left behind a daughter and her two brothers and parents. Her obituary revealed that she was born in Detroit, Michigan, and lived in Greensboro, North Carolina, before she moved to Tampa, Florida in 1980. The funeral of Coryell was conducted at the Van Dyke United Methodist Church on August 24, 1997, with 600 people attending the funeral.

== Murder trials ==
=== Arrest ===
Two days after the murder of LeAnne Coryell, Ray Johnston surrendered himself to the police and was therefore arrested and charged with the murder. At that time, the police publicly released CCTV footage images, which captured a man resembling Johnston withdrawing money from ATMs using the bank card of Coryell, as part of the media coverage of her death, and several people known to Johnston recognized him as the same person photographed by the CCTVs. Johnston, who reportedly denied that he killed Coryell and claimed his innocence, stated that he knew Coryell as a friend after he first met her and later saw her several times, although Coryell's acquaintances stated that the victim never mentioned Johnston to them.

=== First murder trial ===
Johnston's first murder trial, for the charge of killing Coryell, began at the Hillsborough County Circuit Court on June 7, 1999. Jury selection began on the same day, and a 12-member jury was assembled the following day. The prosecution sought the death penalty for Johnston in this case.

During the trial, the prosecution presented evidence linking Johnston as the murderer behind Coryell's death, including DNA evidence proving that she was raped and killed by Johnston. This case was in contrast with Johnston's statements, in which he maintained that he and Coryell were friends and that he had lent money to the victim, who gave him the ATM card and PIN number at a restaurant to withdraw the same amount of cash which she allegedly owed him. A manager of the restaurant stated that Johnston, who was a regular customer, was present on that night but he was not accompanied by Coryell, and while Johnston claimed they met at about 6:30pm before going to the restaurant at 7:30pm, his colleagues testified he was at work that night until 8:40pm.

On June 11, 1999, after a four-day trial, the jury found Johnston guilty of all five counts: first-degree murder, kidnapping, sexual battery, robbery and burglary.

During Johnston's sentencing trial, the defendant made a clear confession to how he abducted and killed Coryell, claiming that he walked up to her and she did not respond, and hence he strangled her out of anger and later abandoned her body. The prosecution, on the other hand, argued for the death penalty, citing that the post-trial confession of Johnston was nothing more than a strategic ploy to avoid the death sentence, and stated that Coryell did not die of a quick death, but was ruthlessly killed after being beaten and raped by her attacker, and it was especially heinous enough to justify the death sentence, apart from the financial motive Johnston harboured when he committed the crime. The defence summoned Johnston's second ex-wife and his sister as witnesses, who testified that Johnston was a good spouse and brother and sought mercy for his life.

On June 17, 1999, the jury unanimously recommended the death penalty for Johnston. A formal sentencing date of August 25, 1999, was scheduled for Johnston, who reportedly wiped his eye with his hand and winced in court, while Johnston's mother became hysterical and had to be assisted by paramedics when she heard the jury announcing the sentence of death for her son. Reports revealed that Coryell's father penned a letter detailing his victim impact statement, and he expressed the loss of his daughter was extremely painful and that he, his wife and their youngest son could no longer hear Coryell greeting them at the front door whenever she came home, and also portrayed his daughter as a good mother to her daughter.

On March 13, 2000, Johnston was formally sentenced to death by Circuit Judge Diana Allen, who found the death penalty appropriate for Johnston based on his 25-year criminal history of violence against women and prior convictions for such offences.

=== Second murder trial ===
Two weeks after his conviction for murdering Coryell, Johnston was indicted by a grand jury in August 1999 for the other charge of killing Janice Nugent, after the authorities linked him to the crime upon his arrest for Coryell's death. Ten months later, Johnston stood trial before a second jury on October 2, 2000, for the first-degree murder of Nugent, and he similarly faced a possible death sentence for the crime.

On October 6, 2000, Johnston was convicted of first-degree murder a second time after the jury found him guilty of murdering Nugent. The jury was set to return on October 18, 2000, to decide on Johnston's sentence for the homicide.

On October 18, 2000, the jury voted 7–5 to sentence Johnston to death.

However, before Johnston could be formally sentenced, Circuit Judge Rex Barbas overturned the jury's recommendation, after it was found that the prosecution committed a procedural error during the penalty phase, and therefore declared it a mistrial and ordered another penalty phase. On April 12, 2001, by a vote of 11–1, a different jury voted to impose the death penalty for Johnston.

On August 22, 2001, Johnston was formally sentenced to death for the murder of Nugent, thus marking his second death sentence for his murder spree.

== Death row ==
As of May 2019, Ray Johnston was one of 19 Hillsborough County prisoners awaiting execution on Florida's death row.

As of 2026, Johnston remains on death row at the Union Correctional Institution.

=== Appeals ===
On December 5, 2002, the Florida Supreme Court dismissed Johnston's direct appeal against his death sentence for Coryell's murder.

On October 16, 2003, the Florida Supreme Court rejected Johnston's direct appeal against his second death sentence for Nugent's murder.

On March 24, 2011, Johnston's appeal was denied by the Florida Supreme Court.

On February 3, 2020, Johnston's appeal was turned down by the 11th Circuit Court of Appeals.

On November 2, 2020, Johnston's petition for a writ of certiorari was denied by the U.S. Supreme Court.

=== Re-sentencing for Nugent's murder ===
In 2016, in light of the 2016 landmark U.S. Supreme Court case Hurst v. Florida, the state of Florida changed its laws and determined that the juries should sentence offenders to death solely based on unanimous jury votes. Due to the legal developments, Johnston was entitled to a re-sentencing trial for the murder of one of his victims, Janice Nugent, because the jury's decision for capital punishment for the Nugent murder was 11–1. However, Johnston's other death sentence for killing the second victim, LeAnne Coryell, remains in effect since the jury unanimously voted for the death sentence in that case.

By May 2020, the prosecution made preparations to seek the death penalty once again for Johnston and another death row inmate, William Deparvine, who was convicted of the 2003 murders of Rick and Karla Van Dusen. At that time, the Florida Supreme Court had ruled that it was not necessary for the jury to unanimously decide on sentencing a person to death in accordance to both a previous state court decision and the Hurst case, making it possible that Johnston could still receive the death penalty based on a non-unanimous vote in his upcoming re-sentencing trial. However, the law was not formally amended until 2023, when the state of Florida passed a new law to allow non-unanimous jury votes from eight or more jurors to impose death sentences, partly due to the infamous school shooter Nikolas Cruz escaping the death sentence for 17 murders after the jury failed to unanimously decide on a death sentence.

On October 12, 2021, Johnston was re-sentenced to life in prison for the murder of Nugent, following a plea deal with the prosecution, who agreed to not pursue the death penalty a third time. According to Nugent's daughter, she earlier informed the prosecution that she hoped that Johnston could admit to murdering her mother, which she felt was more important than the sentence Johnston might receive for the killing, and she did not wish to relive the possibility of another trial for her mother's murder, and she and her family were relieved to know that Johnston finally admitted to the crime in spite of his longstanding claims of innocence.

== Aftermath ==
After the murder of LeAnne Coryell happened, the residents of the apartment complex (where she resided) were alarmed but they stated they would not move out and remained calm, because they felt that the area was safe and violent crime rarely happened. Between January and August 1997, the police received only 10 police reports for burglary, six times for theft and twice for criminal mischief in all the criminal cases tied to the apartment complex.

In October 1998, the parents of LeAnne Coryell filed a lawsuit against the apartment complex where she was kidnapped before her murder, and they claimed that the apartment should be held liable for failing to protect their daughter from Ray Johnston and this led to her death. By June 1999, when Johnston was found guilty of the murder of Coryell, the lawsuit was still ongoing, and Coryell's parents stated they were anticipating that the conviction of their daughter's killer may help them strengthen their case in the proceedings.

In November 2014, a true crime show titled On the Case with Paula Zahn re-enacted the case of Ray Johnston, and it aired as the 14th episode of the show's tenth season.

== See also ==
- Capital punishment in Florida
- List of death row inmates in the United States § Florida
