= Union Correctional Institution =

State prison in Union County, Florida

Coordinates: 30°04′01″N 82°11′34″W

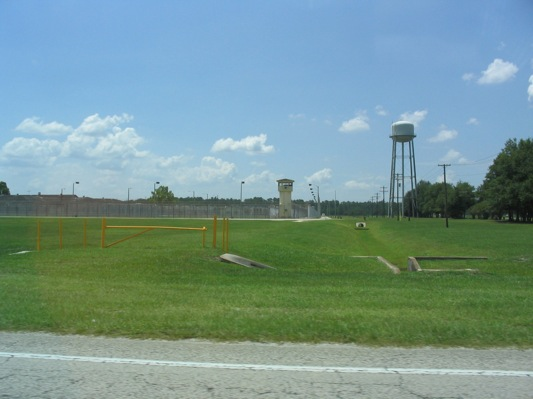
- Interactive map of Union Correctional Institution
- Location: 25636 Northeast State Road 16 Raiford, Florida address, 32083-2632
- Status: Open
- Security class: Mixed
- Capacity: 2172
- Opened: 1913
- Managed by: Florida Department of Corrections
- Website: dc.state.fl.us/ci/213.html

The Union Correctional Institution, formerly referred to as Florida State Prison, and also commonly known as Raiford Prison, is a Florida Department of Corrections state prison located in unincorporated Union County, Florida, United States, near Raiford.

Since it first opened in 1913, the prison has been expanded and restructured many times. The State Prison Farm was one of the last prisons in the United States to abolish the practice of convict leasing in 1923. In 1955, the first buildings of the East Unit were established, across the Bradford County line to the south. In July 1972, the East Unit became the new Florida State Prison, and the old prison was redesignated as the Union Correctional Institution.

As of 2016, Union remains one of the largest prisons in the Florida system. It houses a maximum capacity of 2,172 adult male prisoners at a range of security levels (maximum, close, medium, minimum, and community).

== History ==
=== State Prison Farm ===
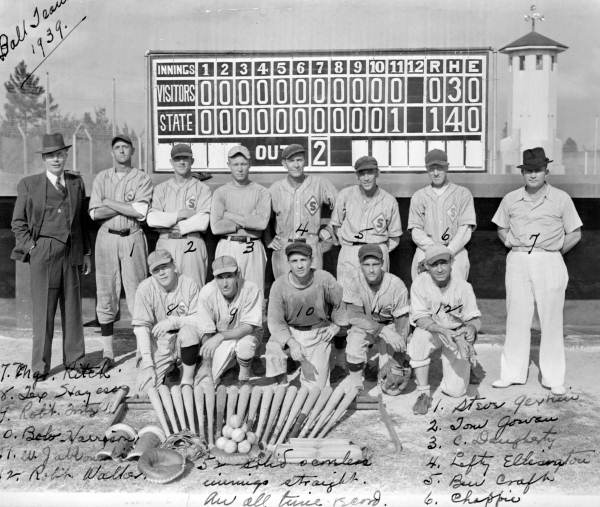
Raiford State Prison baseball team, 1939

Florida's largest and oldest correctional institution was established in 1913 to house infirm inmates who could not be leased to private businesses. The initial population of the prison was close to 600 inmates, both male and female. Given the official name of Raiford Penitentiary, the facility was referred to almost exclusively as "State Prison Farm", as convicts' duties routinely included farming the 18,000-acre (73 km^{2}) prison property. The population at the facility remained fairly constant during these early years; the number of inmates needed for the farm would dictate the initial capacity for the prison.

In January 1919, Captain J. S. Blitch was appointed warden and attempted to bring about positive change to the facility. The inmates were rewarded for their labors in the field with theatrical productions, and weekly baseball games. However, continued reports of guards beating inmates soured the positive image that Blitch was trying to publicize. Brutal treatment of inmates in the convict lease system would lead to the abandonment of convict lease in 1923. By the early 1920s, the large State Prison Farm property consisted of approximately 4,000 acres (16 km^{2}) under cultivation, kept in large part by the prisoners. Also on the property was a shoe factory that made 10 pairs of shoes per day. Living conditions in the prison were very poor. The women especially lived in horrid conditions, housed separately from the men in overcrowded, wooden dormitories.

A 1928 report on the American penal system shows that, of the 1,101 male prisoners received, 674 (61%) were of color and 427 (39%) were white. Segregation existed in all aspects of prison life, from working areas to hospitals to bathrooms.

=== Florida State Prison ===
Following the abolition of convict lease and the subsequent increase in the inmate population, the prison structure changed. In 1927, a license tag factory was constructed, adding to the already extensive production line of the prison. The Main Housing Unit ("The Rock") was erected in 1928, a major step in the process of increasing the prison population. This building was kept in use until court order in 1985. ("The Rock" remained at the prison site unused until demolition in 1999.) By 1932, the inmate population was over 2,000, and a mess hall, auditorium and library had been added. The expanding prison also added a laundry and shirt factory around this time. Shortly after, in 1935, a maximum-security building was constructed, the "Flat Top". This proved vital in the expansion of the center, as from this stage forward the prison would remain a maximum-security facility. This was also the year the "West Unit" was built to house female offenders which remained in use until 1954 when the Florida Correctional Institution in Ocala was opened and all the female inmates were transferred from Raiford to the new facility (the West Unit remained in use as a medical facility until 1968). In 1955, the "East Unit", a new maximum-security facility was completed.

The East Unit became a separate institution in July 1972, renamed Florida State Prison. The original prison site became known as Union Correctional Institution. In 1983, a corrections officer was stabbed to death by two inmates. A new Death Row was constructed in 1992, coinciding with the relocation of inmates from the State Prison next door. The present-day facility still uses many of the older buildings. The prison has an eclectic range of facilities, from hearing impaired and elderly accommodation to designated confinement space. The prison also has a variety of living residences, such as cell units, house units and self-contained houses.

A 1999 report by the St. Petersburg Times took a detailed look into issues of racism and diversity in the Union Correctional Institution. The report stated that more than half of the inmates were black, and more than 75% of the guards were white. This alone was grounds for racial tension. Several officers and inmates reported a clique of racist guards, distinguishable by the cord key chains they would wear. Problems turned out to be far more significant, however, after a review of public records and court files revealed over 100 black agency employees were involved in lawsuits alleging rampant racism and discrimination in the prison system. Perhaps worst of these allegations, a black recreation manager once arrived at his desk to find across his bulletin board the letters "KKK". The report also included the story of a 1993 incident, where inmates on death row were exposed to a man wearing a KKK-style white sheet walking by their cells.

== Notable inmates ==
=== Current inmates ===
- Peter Avsenew, sentenced to death for the 2010 murders of a gay couple, Kevin Powell and Stephen Adams, in Wilton Manors, Florida
- Michael S. Bargo, sentenced to death for the murder of Seath Jackson in 2011
- Leo Boatman, convicted serial killer
- Daniel Burns Jr., who shot and killed Florida Highway Patrol Trooper Jeffrey Young during a traffic stop in 1987
- Steven Anthony Cozzie, convicted of the 2011 murder of Courtney Wilkes
- Daniel Craven, convicted of killing his cellmate in 2015
- Leon Davis Jr., serial killer and arsonist
- Wayne C. Doty, murderer and drug robber
- Dwight Eaglin, former professional boxer and serial killer
- Kevin D. Foster, murderer and leader of the Lords of Chaos
- Konstantinos Fotopoulos, who killed two men in separate incidents in 1989
- Enoch Hall, convicted of the 2008 murder of Donna Fitzgerald
- Gary Hilton, serial killer
- Demorris Hunter, serial killer convicted of killing three people in California and Florida
- Ray Lamar Johnston, sentenced to death for the murders of two women in 1997
- Ian Deco Lightbourne, convicted of the 1981 murder of Nancy O'Farrell
- Steven Lorenzo, double murderer and rapist
- Markeith Loyd, murderer
- Meryl Stanley McDonald and Robert Roy Gordon, convicted of the 1994 murder-for-hire of Louis Davidson
- Everett Glenn Miller, who shot and killed two police officers in 2017 in Kissimmee, Florida
- Norberto Pietri, convicted of the 1988 murder of Brian Chappell
- Craig C. Price, juvenile serial killer
- Carl Puiatti, one of the two culprits in the 1983 murder of Sharilyn Ritchie; his co-defendant Robert Dewey Glock was executed in 2001
- William Reaves, convicted of the 1986 murder of Richard Raczkoski
- Granville Ritchie, convicted of the 2014 rape and murder of Felecia Williams
- Michael Thomas Rivera, convicted of the 1986 murder of Staci Jazvac
- Jeremiah Martel Rodgers and Jonathan Huey Lawrence, convicted of the 1998 murder of Jennifer Robinson
- James Franklin Rose, sentenced to death for the 1976 kidnap-murder of Lisa Lynn Berry
- Mark Sievers, convicted of the murder of Teresa Sievers
- Donald J. Smith, convicted of the murder of Cherish Perrywinkle
- David Kelsey Sparre, convicted of the 2010 murder of Tiara Pool in Jacksonville, Florida
- George Trepal, murderer and poisoner
- Quentin Marcus Truehill, convicted of the 2010 murder of Vincent Binder
- Troy Victorino, perpetrator of the Deltona massacre
- William Edward Wells, convicted serial killer and mass murderer
- Wade Wilson, sentenced to death twice for the murder of two women in 2019
- Zephen Allen Xaver, sentenced to 5 times for the 2019 Sebring shooting
- William Thomas Zeigler, mass murderer and family annihilator

=== Former inmates ===
- Gary Ray Bowles, serial killer
- Ted Bundy, serial killer
- Robert Frederick Carr, pedophilic serial killer and rapist
- Oba Chandler, serial killer
- Daniel Conahan, murderer and possible serial killer
- John Brennan Crutchley, rapist, murderer, and suspected serial killer
- James Aren Duckett, child murderer and possible serial killer
- Franklin Delano Floyd, kidnapper, murderer, sex offender, and possible serial killer
- Clarence Earl Gideon, wrongfully convicted burglar
- Groveland Four, four men accused of raping a woman and beating her husband
- Robert Dewey Glock, one of the two culprits in the 1983 murder of Sharilyn Ritchie; his co-defendant Carl Puiatti remains on death row
- Billy Leon Kearse, convicted of the 1991 murder of Danny Parrish, a Fort Pierce police officer
- Edward Dean Kennedy, escapee and serial killer
- Bobby Joe Long, serial killer and rapist
- James David Manning, controversial Harlem pastor
- Renaldo McGirth, convicted of the murder of Diana Miller
- Dominick Occhicone, who murdered Martha and Raymond Artzner, his ex-girlfriend's parents, in 1986
- Donn Pearce, AWOL-er and counterfeiter
- Glen Edward Rogers, serial killer and rapist
- Danny Rolling, serial killer
- Randy Schoenwetter, double murderer
- Nelson Serrano, mass murderer
- Eddie Lee Sexton, satanist and incestuous rapist and murderer
- Joseph P. Smith, convicted of killing Carlie Brucia (subject of Carlie's Law)
- Dusty Ray Spencer, convicted wife murderer
- Ottis Toole, serial killer, cannibal
- Dan White, actor convicted of robbery
- James Winkles, murderer, kidnapper and alleged serial killer
- Giuseppe Zangara, attempted assassin of U.S. president Franklin D. Roosevelt and assassin of Chicago mayor Anton Cermak

=== Fiction ===
- Blondell Wayne Tatum - Carl Hiaasen character

== See also ==
- McDonough, Gary W., ed. (1993). "Appendix A: A Day in Florida's State Prison". The Florida Negro. A Federal Writers' Project Legacy. University Press of Mississippi. pp. 137–143. ISBN 0878055886.
