= Murder of Brian Chappell =

1988 murder of a police officer in West Palm Beach, Florida

- Brian Chappell
- Location: West Palm Beach, Florida, United States
- Date: August 22, 1988; 38 years ago
- Attack type: Murder by shooting
- Deaths: Brian Heywood Chappell, 31
- Motive: To avoid arrest
- Verdict: Guilty
- Convictions: First-degree murder Burglary; Theft of firearm
- Sentence: Death (March 15, 1990)
- Convicted: Norberto Pietri

On August 22, 1988, in West Palm Beach, Florida, 31-year-old West Palm Beach police officer Brian Heywood Chappell (June 1, 1957 - August 22, 1988) was shot and killed by a truck driver during a traffic stop. The perpetrator, Norberto Pietri (born March 13, 1963), had walked away from a work release center. Pietri committed a burglary and stole a truck before Officer Chappell pulled him over. Pietri shot Chappell during the traffic stop, and he was found guilty of first-degree murder and sentenced to death on March 15, 1990.

== Murder investigation ==
=== Fatal shooting ===
On August 22, 1988, 31-year-old Brian Heywood Chappell, a police officer, was fatally shot while conducting a traffic stop in West Palm Beach, Florida. On that day, Chappell was riding his motorcycle to keep a lookout for speeding motorists, when he encountered 25-year-old Norberto "Spiderman" Pietri, who was driving a silver pickup truck at high speeds. Chappell chased the truck for a mile before the driver stopped. After pulling over the truck, Officer Chappell turned on his motorcycle's emergency lights and approached the truck, but when he was within two to four feet of the truck, Pietri wielded a gun and fired a shot at the chest of Officer Chappell, who was mortally wounded. Pietri sped off in the truck. In spite of his lethal wound, Chappell managed to radio for help before he was found dead by the first officer who arrived after he responded to his call for help.

Pietri was an escaped convict at the time of Officer Chappell's murder. A week prior to the shooting, on August 15, 1988, Pietri left his work release program at the Lantana Community Correctional Center and spent the rest of the night consuming cocaine before he returned the next day. Three days after he first walked out of the center, on August 18, 1988, Pietri violated a disciplinary protocol that restricted him to his room, and again left the center, and he never returned. During the next four days on the run, Pietri committed burglaries, and he stole the truck he drove at the time of the murder. On the day of the murder, Pietri broke into a sheriff's deputy's home, where he stole jewelry, a videocassette recorder, camcorder, coins, a .38-caliber revolver and a .9mm semiautomatic pistol. After the burglary, Pietri planned to exchange the stolen property for cocaine, and he was driving to meet a drug dealer when he was pulled over by Officer Chappell.

On August 25, 1998, a funeral was held for the fallen officer. More than 1,000 police officers from across Florida, as well as from cities including New York City and Los Angeles, attended the service. Law enforcement officers from Canada also traveled to attend the funeral and pay their respects to Chappell.

=== Arrest of the killer ===
After murdering Chappell, Pietri drove the truck to a canal near Florida's Turnpike, where he drove it into the water to dispose of it. Afterwards, Pietri went to a relative's house, where he ordered a pizza delivery and used the stolen coins to pay for the food. Meanwhile, the police began their investigation into the murder, and the ballistics experts matched the cartridge casings found at the crime scene to the ammunition stolen from the deputy's home. The police also received witness reports that a truck matching the description of the one seen at the crime scene had been driven into the canal. Authorities later located the truck submerged in the canal.

Pietri was identified as the prime suspect after his niece called the police and reported that her uncle was at the scene of crime; earlier, Pietri lied to his niece, stating that he had been at the scene with another man who shot and killed the victim. After receiving the call from Pietri's niece, the police placed surveillance on Pietri and his family members. On August 24, 1988, Pietri was spotted by police officers near his sister's apartment after he stole a Toyota car, and he later encountered an off-duty police officer near a church. He escaped after he threatened to shoot the officer. The Toyota was found by a detective, who discovered the stolen VCR and camcorder inside it.

Later that evening, while avoiding the manhunt, Pietri carjacked a mother-son pair outside their house, just as the pair and the woman's husband were about to go outdoors. At first, Pietri held the woman at gunpoint and forced her to drive, even threatening to shoot her. She froze, however, prompting Pietri to push her out of the car. Pietri drove off while the couple's five-year-old son was still inside. After some distance, Pietri slowed the car to allow the boy's father to take him back before he continued driving. While driving, Pietri was spotted by several Delray Beach police officers, who pursued him. The chase lasted until Pietri lost control of the car; the vehicle went off the road before it stopped at a municipal golf course. Pietri fled on foot before he was arrested by the Delray Beach police for Chappell's murder.

== Charges ==
On August 31, 1988, Norberto Pietri was charged with the theft of a Browning 9mm semiautomatic pistol from a sheriff's deputy's home; the same gun was used by Pietri to kill Chappell. While Pietri was in police custody, the authorities had sent divers to search for the missing gun in the canal where they found the stolen truck, but the search was unsuccessful.

On September 1, 1988, Pietri was charged with grand theft and burglary for the crimes he committed prior to the murder. The West Palm Beach police announced that they would file murder charges against Pietri within a week.

On September 2, 1988, Pietri was charged with first-degree murder, possession of a firearm by a convicted felon, and using a firearm during the commission of a felony. After he was charged for the killing, Pietri was ordered to be detained without bond in a Palm Beach County jail.

On September 22, 1988, a Palm Beach County grand jury formally indicted Pietri on 16 criminal charges, including first-degree murder, escape, grand theft auto, possession of a firearm by a convicted felon, burglary and possession of cocaine. Under Florida state law, for the most serious charge of first-degree murder, Pietri could be sentenced to death or life imprisonment if found guilty.

On December 28, 1989, a judge denied Pietri's motion to dismiss the murder charge, after he rejected Pietri's allegation that the police sent a spy to infiltrate an investigator's office and take classified documents to the detriment of Pietri's trial defense.

== Norberto Pietri ==
=== Personal life ===
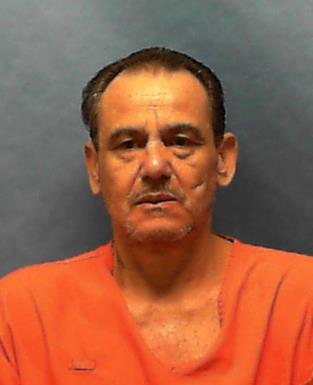
Pietri FDOC mugshot

Norberto Pietri was born on March 13, 1963, in Puerto Rico. Pietri, who had 13 siblings (another source claimed nine), grew up in extreme poverty, and in his early years the family stayed together in a small two-bedroom house. Pietri's father was reportedly an alcoholic who often beat up his wife and children, and when Pietri was two, his father left the family. Subsequently, Pietri and his family moved to New York, and at one point during his childhood, Pietri was sexually abused for two years by a friend of his mother.

By the time he reached adolescence, Pietri moved to Florida to work at his brother's landscaping business. In 1984, at the age of 21, Pietri became addicted to cocaine after another one of Pietri's brothers introduced him to the drug. According to his siblings, Pietri was a nice and fun person before his addiction to cocaine, but in the four years leading up to Chappell's murder, Pietri was convicted 28 times of multiple felonies and served varying prison terms before he escaped from Lantana Community Correctional Center; this was Pietri's last incarceration before Chappell's murder.

=== Trial ===
The murder trial of Norberto Pietri was scheduled to begin on January 22, 1990, and jury selection began that day. After two days of jury selection, the trial judge declared a mistrial on January 24, 1990, granting a defense motion that he erred in mentioning to a prospective juror that a defendant facing a capital charge was entitled to appeal to the higher courts.

Ultimately, the trial began on February 1, 1990. During the trial, the prosecution argued that Pietri had intentionally shot and killed Chappell and sought to prove that the murder was carried out in the course of another felony. The defense argued that there was no premeditation behind the shooting and it was done while Pietri was in a state of cocaine-induced panic. Three 13-year-old boys testified that they had witnessed the shooting, and they identified Pietri based on their recognition of his tattoo and the clothing he wore at the time of the offense. Pietri took the witness stand in his own defense, testifying that he had no prior plan to shoot the officer and only planned to drive to trade some stolen jewelry for cocaine to feed his habit. He stated that he panicked and shot the victim to escape.

On February 7, 1990, Pietri was found guilty of first-degree murder and 13 other felony charges, including escape, auto theft and burglary. Pietri was acquitted of the 15th and last charge, which was the false imprisonment of the five-year-old boy who was in the car at the time he was chased. Sentencing was scheduled for February 22, 1990.

During the sentencing hearing, Assistant State Attorney Charles Burton sought the death penalty for Pietri, citing the long criminal history of the defendant, who committed the murder after he escaped from prison, and further emphasized that the fatal shooting was "cold, calculated and premeditated" and the victim in question was a police officer, which justified the imposition of capital punishment. The defense argued against the death sentence, and Pietri's family members and relatives testified about his troubled family background, seeking mercy for him on account of his history of childhood physical and sexual abuse, his impoverished family life, and his struggle with cocaine addiction.

On February 23, 1990, the jury voted 8-4 in favor of a death sentence. After the hearing, Pietri reportedly made an apology in court to Chappell's family. According to Tom Chappell, the victim's father, he did not expect the apology but was glad to hear it, and he also added that justice had been done with the jury's verdict of death.

On March 15, 1990, Pietri was formally sentenced to death via the electric chair by Circuit Judge Marvin Mounts. During sentencing, Judge Mounts said that the murder was committed in a "cold, calculated and premeditated manner" and the victim was a law enforcement officer, and the killing occurred in the aftermath of the burglary and prison escape committed by Pietri.

== Appeals ==
On September 29, 1994, Norberto Pietri's direct appeal against his death sentence was rejected by the Florida Supreme Court. However, in the same decision, the court vacated Pietri's sentences for the lesser charges of escape, burglary, grand theft, armed burglary, robbery, kidnapping and cocaine possession, because a sentencing guideline sheet was not prepared before his sentencing for these charges.

On March 15, 1995, Pietri was re-sentenced to life imprisonment and an additional 90 years for the lesser charges.

On August 26, 2004, Pietri lost his appeal to the Florida Supreme Court.

On May 25, 2011, Pietri's appeal was dismissed by the 11th Circuit Court of Appeals.

On March 30, 2017, Palm Beach County Circuit Judge John Kastrenakes denied Pietri's re-sentencing petition. He stated that the death penalty "was absolutely appropriate" in his case because Pietri escaped from prison and continued to commit further offences while on the run, and even killed a police officer, and he further noted that the jury was unanimous in finding Pietri guilty of all the charges of escape, burglary and murder in his trial for the killing of Officer Chappell.

Later that same year, the Florida Supreme Court ruled and upheld that the new laws requiring unanimous votes for the death penalty could only applied to those death row inmates whose convictions and sentences (provided they were non-unanimously imposed) became final after June 24, 2002, the date of a landmark ruling in an Arizona case by the U.S. Supreme Court, and it cannot retroactively apply to death sentences that were imposed and finalized prior to the date. This ruling also effectively put an end to the possibility of re-sentencing for Pietri and other prisoners whose sentences were imposed non-unanimously yet finalized before 2002.

On February 1, 2018, Pietri's appeal was turned down by the Florida Supreme Court, which affirmed that in spite of the jury's non-unanimous vote, Pietri was ineligible for re-sentencing given that the conviction and sentence was finalized in 1995, seven years before 2002.

== Death row ==
A June 2013 report showed that Pietri was one of 18 prisoners on Florida's death row for murder cases originating from Palm Beach County. As of October 2021, of all the 305 inmates on Florida's death row, Pietri was one of eight prisoners who were convicted in Palm Beach County murder cases.

As of 2026, Norberto Pietri remains incarcerated on death row at the Union Correctional Institution.

== Aftermath ==
Officer Brian Chappell was the 17th, and till today, the third-to-last Palm Beach County law enforcement officer to be killed in the line of duty; the last such case happened in 1993. Additionally, Officer Chappell was the most recent West Palm Beach police officer to be murdered in the line of duty.

About 26 years after the murder of Officer Chappell, his father Tom Chappell died at the age of 94 on October 5, 2014. In a previous interview conducted eight years before his death, Tom stated his fear that he would not live long enough to witness the execution of his son's killer, a prediction which came true when he died. When he was asked if he forgave Pietri, Officer Chappell's father stated that he would forgive Pietri only if he could bring his son back to life. West Palm Beach Police Chief Bryan Kummerlen, who was a former colleague of Officer Chappell, stated that the murder brought about a profound effect on Tom over the years he spent waiting for Pietri's execution, and he remarked that there were many more people like Tom who could not get the closure they deserved for losing their loved ones to murder.

== See also ==
- Capital punishment in Florida
- List of death row inmates in the United States § Florida
