= Robert Frederick Carr =

American serial killer (1943–2006)

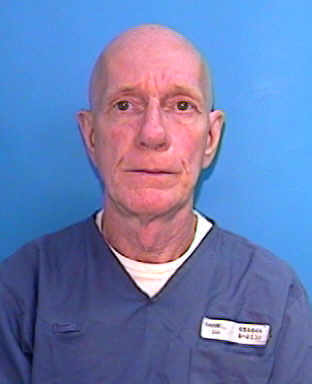
- Born: Robert Frederick Carr III; December 22, 1943; Virginia, U.S.
- Died: July 6, 2006 (aged 62); Union Correctional Institution, Raiford, Florida, U.S.
- Other name: Robert Hunt
- Convictions: First degree murder (3 counts); Sexual battery (4 counts)
- Penalty: Life imprisonment

Details
- Victims: 4
- Span of crimes: 1972–1976
- Country: United States
- States: Florida; Connecticut
- Date apprehended: May 30, 1976

Robert Frederick Carr III (December 22, 1943 – July 6, 2006) was an American serial killer and pedophile who killed three children and one woman in the states of Florida and Connecticut between 1972 and 1976. Carr, a former television repairman, additionally admitted to molesting more than a dozen children until his apprehension. Following his arrest, he was sentenced to life imprisonment, which he served until his death in 2006.

== Early life ==
Robert Frederick Carr III was born on December 22, 1943, in Virginia. According to his confession, he had a troubled childhood, reportedly being forced into prostitution at 11 years old and stealing cars as a teen. As an adult, he moved to Connecticut, where he would ultimately start a relationship and get married, as well as getting a job fixing TVs. Carr would later admit that when having sex he would fantasize about committing rape and murder.

== Murders ==
Tammy Ruth Huntley, 16, vanished while waiting for her mother to pick her up. Carr drove her from Miami to Mississippi. On April 7, 1972, after raping her over the 10 days he kept her captive in the woods, he strangled her, saying, "I killed her because she looked like she was getting despondent."

In late 1972, Carr visited Florida, and on November 13, 1972, he picked up 11-year-old friends Todd Payton and Mark Wilson, who were hitchhiking from North Miami Beach. The inside back doors in the car were disabled and the trunk was filled with food, jars of petroleum jelly, and a shovel. Carr raped the boys and strangled Payton. Four days later, he strangled Wilson, for which he would receive an additional 20 years in prison when he was eventually sentenced. After the murders, he drove to Mississippi and Louisiana, burying one boy in each state. Both boys were subsequently reported missing by their parents when they did not return home.

In 1973, Carr was convicted of rape in Connecticut and sentenced to four to eight years in prison, but was paroled in 1976, after serving less than three years. Upon his release in Connecticut, he would kill his fourth and final victim, 21-year-old Rhonda Holloway, before burying her body in a rural area.

== Trial and imprisonment ==
On May 30, 1976, Carr raped a hitchhiker at knifepoint. During the attack, a Metro police officer stumbled upon the car and witnessed the rape, arresting Carr. Once in interrogation, Carr surprised detectives by confessing to four murders, explaining the crimes in detail. Carr, along with detectives David Simmons, Charles Zatrepalek and deputy medical examiner Ronald Wright, went on a long mission to find the bodies.

Carr confessed that after Huntley's murder he raped an additional four girls and two boys. Only four were reported, for which he was charged and pleaded guilty.

Carr pleaded guilty and was sentenced to life in prison. He served part of his sentence at a state mental hospital, but was kicked out after it was found he was hoarding wire cutters and pliers. Afterwards he began mailing letters to prosecutor Ed O'Donnell, who had previously worked on the case.

== Death ==
On July 6, 2006, Carr died at the Union Correctional Institution from unspecified causes. In an interview with CNN, his daughter stated that he died of prostate cancer.

== See also ==
- List of serial killers in the United States

== Bibliography ==
- Edna Buchanan (October 22, 1979). Carr: Five Years of Rape and Murder. E. P. Dutton. ISBN 0525076573.
