= Murder of Courtney Wilkes =

2010 kidnapping, rape and murder of a teenage girl in Florida

Courtney Ann Wilkes
- Born: July 9, 1995; Georgia, U.S.
- Died: June 16, 2011 (aged 15); Seagrove Beach, Florida, U.S.
- Cause of death: Fatal head injuries and strangulation
- Education: Toombs County High School
- Known for: Murder victim

The murder of Courtney Wilkes (July 9, 1995 – June 16, 2011) occurred on June 16, 2011, when the 15-year-old native of Georgia was kidnapped while vacationing in Florida, and her abductor, 21-year-old Steven Anthony Cozzie (born June 26, 1989), who was homeless at the time of the crime, brought her to a secluded nature trail in Seagrove Beach, where he raped and murdered her by strangulation and assault. Cozzie was found guilty of first-degree murder and sentenced to death on October 18, 2013. He is currently on death row awaiting execution at the Union Correctional Institution.

== Murder ==
On June 16, 2011, a teenage girl from Georgia who was on vacation with her family in Florida was kidnapped, raped and murdered by a homeless man.

Three days prior to her murder, on June 13, 2011, 15-year-old Courtney Wilkes and her family arrived at Seagrove Beach, Florida. On their first day in Seagrove Beach, the Wilkes family first met 21-year old Steven Anthony Cozzie at the beach outside their condominium. Cozzie, who was then homeless, was believed to be working at the beach by the Wilkes family, since he was seen taking away the beach chairs and roaming around the beach.

On June 16, 2011, the day before they were set to go back to Georgia, the Wilkes family gathered together as a whole on the beach, and Wilkes went out for a walk with Cozzie. After he left the beach with Wilkes, Cozzie kidnapped the girl and forcibly brought her to a secluded nature trail, where he strangled her with his shirt and hands, before bludgeoning her in the head with a piece of wood and stomping her neck. Wilkes, who was also raped by Cozzie, died as a result of the fatal head injuries and strangulation. Autopsy results showed that the victim's skull had been shattered into 16 pieces.

On that same day, Wilkes's family members reported her missing after they failed to find her. Within hours, Cozzie's friend, Michael Spencer, reported to the police that Cozzie admitted to him about killing Wilkes. Cozzie was later taken into custody, and he subsequently led the police to where he disposed of Wilkes's body.

== Trial ==
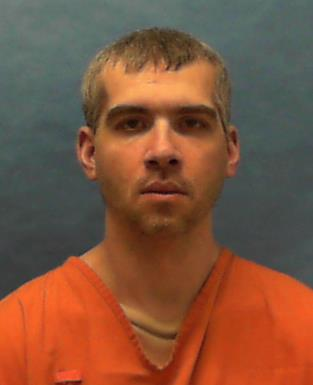
Steven Cozzie

On June 17, 2011, hours after the discovery of Courtney Wilkes's corpse, Steven Cozzie was arrested and charged with the murder of Wilkes.

In November 2012, Cozzie was scheduled to stand trial on June 10, 2013. The prosecution intended to seek the death penalty for Cozzie.

During the trial itself, the confession tapes of Cozzie were played out in court, and in these tapes, Cozzie initially denied killing Wilkes, but later claimed he did kill Wilkes but allegedly forced to do so by Michael Spencer, a friend of his. However, DNA expert Jennifer Hatler stated that based on forensic evidence, Cozzie was at the scene of crime while Spencer was not, and Cozzie's DNA was found on a discarded Hawaiian shirt soaked with Wilkes's blood from near the scene, and also on Wilkes's thigh, while the DNA of Wilkes's was detected under Cozzie's fingernails. Spencer, who appeared in court as a witness, testified against Cozzie and stated that he heard Cozzie implicitly confessing to the crime by making the remark, "I just killed this chick."

On June 14, 2013, the jury found Cozzie guilty of first-degree premeditated murder, sexual battery, aggravated child abuse and kidnapping. As a result of his conviction, Cozzie faced a potential sentence of life imprisonment without the possibility of parole or the death penalty for the most serious charge of first-degree murder.

Assistant State Attorney Bobby Elmore argued that the death penalty was appropriate for Cozzie based on the "heinous, atrocious and cruel" manner of Wilkes's death, while Defense Attorney Sharon Wilson argued that Cozzie should not face the death penalty.

During the sentencing trial, a 16-year-old girl from Kentucky was summoned to court as a witness, and she revealed that one week prior to the murder, she was attacked by Cozzie, who tried to strangle her, pushed her to the ground and even threatened her to undress herself. The girl, who was only 14 at the time of the attack, survived but her family did not call the police due to her lack of injury; the girl's grandmother expressed remorse for not reporting Cozzie earlier before he killed Wilkes. Family members of Wilkes also showed up in court to testify, and Wilkes's mother expressed her grief of losing her daughter by stating, "A third of my heart has been ripped out." Cozzie's family members also testified on the dysfunctional family background of the accused; his 21-year-old half-sister revealed she was being molested by Cozzie when she was just a child, and his two youngest half-sisters were allegedly molested by a relative of Cozzie, and while Cozzie was in high school, his stepmother had several relationships with young boys and slept with them.

On June 19, 2013, the jury returned with its verdict, unanimously recommending the death penalty for Cozzie. A formal sentencing hearing was scheduled to take place on October 17, 2013.

== Sentence ==
On October 17, 2013, Circuit Judge Kelvin Wells formally sentenced Cozzie to death for first-degree murder. Aside from the death sentence, Judge Wells also meted out life sentences for aggravated battery with a deadly weapon and for kidnapping, plus 30 years' jail for aggravated child abuse.

In February 2019, Steven Cozzie was named as one of six death row inmates convicted for murders committed within Walton County, Florida.

In 2025, it was reported that Cozzie was one of 17 death row convicts sentenced for murders committed within Northwest Florida.

As of 2025, Cozzie remains on death row at the Union Correctional Institution.

=== Appeals ===
By February 2016, when the U.S. Supreme Court made a landmark ruling in the 2016 case of Hurst v. Florida, which ruled on the issues of Florida's death penalty laws, Steven Cozzie was named as one of the 43 inmates who were still having their direct appeals processed by the Florida Supreme Court.

After the ruling in the Hurst v. Florida case, where the court ruled that only juries should impose death sentences in Florida, and the law facing changes to allow only unanimous jury verdicts to impose death sentences, it was speculated that the death penalty cases decided before 2002 could receive new penalty phases, and Cozzie was one of six convicted murderers from Northwest Florida sentenced to death after 2002.

On May 11, 2017, the Florida Supreme Court dismissed Cozzie's appeal against his death sentence. The court found that Cozzie was not entitled to a new sentencing hearing, given that he was sentenced to death by unanimous jury votes, and in accordance to the Hurst principles, the error in his case was harmless and his death sentence was thus upheld.

On April 2, 2018, the U.S. Supreme Court denied Cozzie's appeal by a majority vote, and according to Justice Sonia Sotomayor, who dissented, she strongly criticised the Florida Supreme Court for refusing the appeals of Cozzie and several other previous cases for not looking through the "substantial" claims made by the defendants pertaining to their challenge of the Eighth Amendment.

== Aftermath ==
Andrew Lawrence, a student at Georgia Southern University–Armstrong Campus, wrote an opinion piece in 2017, stating that while a controversial and highly debated issue, the death penalty was still relevant and should be deployed for heinous crimes, and he named the murder of Courtney Wilkes as one of the worst cases that warranted capital punishment.

In October 2018, the murder of Courtney Wilkes was named as one of the most heinous crimes committed in Northwest Florida. The same report revealed that of all the perpetrators behind these cases, 17 of them, including Cozzie, were sentenced to death by the state of Florida.

== See also ==
- Capital punishment in Florida
- List of death row inmates in the United States § Florida
