= Murder of Staci Jazvac =

1986 abduction and murder of a young girl in Broward County, Florida

- Staci Jazvac
- Location: Broward County, Florida, United States
- Date: January 30, 1986; 40 years ago
- Attack type: Child murder Child abduction
- Deaths: Staci Lynn Jazvac, 11
- Verdict: Guilty
- Convictions: First-degree murder
- Sentence: Death (May 1, 1987)
- Convicted: Michael Thomas Rivera

The murder of Staci Jazvac happened in Broward County, Florida on January 30, 1986. On that day, 11-year-old Jazvac, who cycled to buy school supplies from a store, was kidnapped by Michael Thomas Rivera (born June 25, 1962), who murdered her before he abandoned her body in a field at Coral Springs, Florida. Rivera was arrested two weeks later and charged with the murder of Jazvac, whose body was found thereafter. Rivera was found guilty of first-degree murder and sentenced to death on May 1, 1987.

== Murder ==
On January 30, 1986, an 11-year-old girl went missing, before she was found murdered two weeks later.

On that day, 11-year-old Staci Lynn Jazvac left her house and rode her bicycle to purchase school supplies from a nearby store. She was last seen buying a poster by a cashier, and she was never seen again after 7pm. When Jazvac failed to return home, her mother went to find the girl, whose bicycle was found abandoned in a field near the shopping center by a Broward County Deputy Sheriff. Jazvac was reported missing to the police, and investigations and a search was conducted to locate the whereabouts of the missing girl.

After some investigations, the police linked one male suspect to the disappearance of Jazvac, and the suspect was 23-year-old Michael Thomas Rivera, who was first arrested for an unrelated case on February 13, 1986. During questioning, Rivera denied that he was involved in the girl's disappearance, despite admitting that he had exposed himself on several occasions in front of females in the past. However, the police had received a complaint that Rivera, under the alias "Tony", made over 30 obscene phone calls to a woman since September 1985, and during the last phone call, which was made after Jazvac's disappearance, Rivera admitted to murdering the girl after he abducted her from behind and dragged her inside the back of his van. When Rivera was later put on trial for murdering Jazvac, several inmates who interacted with Rivera in prison had testified to hearing Rivera confessing to killing the girl; one of them additionally stated that Rivera confessed to choking Jazvac the same way as how he choked another girl he kidnapped in an unrelated incident (the same case for which he was arrested in February 1986).

On February 14, 1986, the body of Jazvac was discovered in a field at Coral Springs, where a truck driver stopped for a lunch break just as he first spotted the corpse. Dr. Ronald Keith Wright, a forensic pathologist, later conducted an autopsy and certified that the cause of death was homicide caused by asphyxiation as a result of choking.

== Charges ==
On February 15, 1986, Broward County Sheriff Nick Navarro said in a public statement that Rivera would be charged soon for the murder of Staci Jazvac.

In March 1986, Rivera was assigned a defense lawyer to represent him in court. That same month, a judge ordered Rivera to undergo a pre-trial psychiatric examination.

In April 1986, Rivera's case was scheduled to be reviewed by a grand jury within the next two weeks. That same month, the Broward State Attorney's Office effectively took over the case after the detectives submitted most of the evidence to the prosecution.

By June 1986, Rivera was still not formally charged with the murder of Jazvac, due to a delay in forwarding the case to the grand jury. Assistant State Attorney Kelly Hancock, who was in charge of the prosecution, stated that he was held back from handling the case since January 1986 due to back-to-back murder cases. By late July 1986, a Broward County grand jury was set to hear and review the case on August 6, 1986.

On August 6, 1986, the grand jury formally indicted Rivera for the first-degree murder of Jazvac. Eight days later, Rivera pleaded not guilty to the murder charge.

== Perpetrator ==
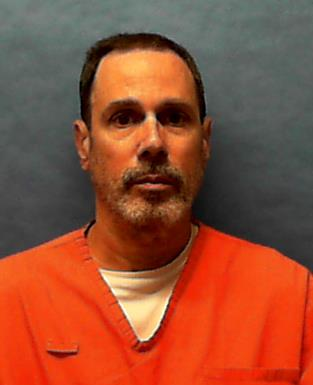
2026 FDOC mugshot of Rivera

Michael Thomas Rivera was born on June 25, 1962, at Bronx Municipal Hospital Center in The Bronx, New York. Rivera was the second child of four children (including a pair of twin sisters) born to Peter and Esther Rivera in a Puerto Rican family, and according to sources, his mother was a heavy smoker while she was pregnant with her son, and Rivera suffered from poor health as a result in his childhood, including a ruptured appendix at the age of six, which prompted him to receive surgery. Rivera's father was a heavy alcoholic who often came home drunk and in a bad mood, and this alcoholism persisted even after Rivera's family relocated from New York to Florida. During his childhood years in New York, Rivera attended Catholic schools, and at nine years old, he started working at his father's service station, but he was not treated well in work by his father, who did not have a good bond with his son due to his past as a victim of childhood abuse.

At the age of 13, Rivera's family moved out of New York and re-settled in Fort Lauderdale, Florida. He began to abuse drugs and alcohol, and at one point, he was sexually abused by one of his male neighbors who lived in the same apartment complex as his family. As a teenager, Rivera attended Boyd H. Anderson High School in Lauderdale Lakes, where teachers described him as a "hall drifter" who frequently skipped classes, did not participate in extracurricular activities, and dropped out after his junior year. Rivera's drop-out occurred after he failed his 11th grade, and this was a result of his drug addiction, which affected his family and school life in general. Although school staff remembered him as an unremarkable student, friends and neighbors described him as likable, somewhat shy, and interested in ordinary topics such as cars and girls.

Rivera had a documented criminal history prior to the Jazvac case. He was first incarcerated in juvenile prisons around age 14 to 15, and in 1981, he pleaded guilty to indecent assault and committing a lewd act on a child under 14. Rivera initially received five years of probation and was ordered to undergo psychological counseling, but after repeatedly violating the terms of his probation, he was sentenced to five years in prison in 1982. During his incarceration, Rivera voluntarily entered a treatment program for mentally-ill sex offenders at South Florida State Hospital but withdrew after about three months and completed the remainder of his sentence in prison. He was released early in July 1984.

Before the murder of Jazvac, Rivera was also involved in the kidnapping of an 11-year-old girl on July 10, 1985. On that day, Rivera was at a Coral Springs condominium when he first saw the victim, and he decided to molest the child. He grabbed her from behind and forcibly took her into a wooded area, where he choked the girl until she fell unconscious. Rivera later fled the scene after he was being startled by a passing maintenance worker.

== Trials of Michael Rivera ==
=== Indecent exposure trials ===
Prior to his trial for murder, Michael Rivera first stood trial for charges unrelated to Staci Jazvac's murder. On May 28, 1986, Rivera's first trial for indecent exposure ended with a guilty verdict by the jury, and he was sentenced to one year and two months in prison. In this case, Rivera was charged with wearing a woman's one-piece bathing suit and exposing himself in front of a Coral Springs teenager on November 11, 1985.

On June 2, 1986, Rivera pleaded guilty in a second trial for another charge of indecent exposure, in which he loitered around an apartment building while he wore lingerie under his clothes.

On October 9, 1986, Rivera's third trial for indecent exposure, in which the alleged victim was a three-year-old girl, ended with the acquittal of Rivera for a charge of performing a lewd and lascivious act in the presence of a child. The jury in this case deliberated for three hours before they decided that there was insufficient evidence to warrant a conviction for the crime.

=== Kidnapping trial ===
Rivera was initially scheduled to stand trial for the 1985 abduction and attempted murder of an 11-year-old girl in April 1986, before it was postponed to June 1986. On November 4, 1986, Rivera finally stood trial for this case.

On November 6, 1986, Rivera was found guilty of attempted first-degree murder, kidnapping, aggravated child abuse and aggravated battery. For these above offences, Rivera faced a potential sentence of 17 to 22 years in prison.

On November 20, 1986, Rivera was sentenced to life imprisonment for the abduction and attack. Despite the fact that the sentence exceeded the state's recommended sentencing guidelines, the prosecution urged the court to not follow the guidelines due to Rivera's recalcitrant criminal behaviour and multiple past offences, which justified a harsher custodial sentence in his case.

=== Murder trial ===
On April 16, 1987, Rivera was found guilty of first-degree murder by a Broward County jury after it deliberated the case for 90 minutes. Jazvac's mother was present in court to hear the verdict, and she remarked that no other girl would be die even though the verdict cannot revive her daughter, while Jazvac's father, who flew from California to hear the verdict, stated that justice was served. Victim's rights activist John Walsh, whose son Adam was murdered in 1982, accompanied Jazvac's mother to attend the hearing, and he stated that the conviction of Rivera was a victory for parents.

On April 18, 1987, based on an unanimous vote, the jury recommended that Rivera should face the death penalty for the murder of Jazvac.

On May 1, 1987, Rivera was formally sentenced to death via the electric chair by Circuit Judge John Ferris. During sentencing, Judge Ferris described the murder of Jazvac as "especially heinous, atrocious and cruel", and therefore found the death penalty appropriate. When he was taken out of the courtroom, Rivera again proclaimed his innocence and claimed he was "railroaded" and framed by the politicians for raping and murdering the girl.

== Appeals ==
On April 19, 1990, the Florida Supreme Court denied Michael Rivera's direct appeal against his death sentence and murder conviction.

On June 11, 1998, the Florida Supreme Court turned down another appeal from Rivera.

In 2003, there were post-conviction DNA testing procedures conducted in Rivera's case. Through the testing, it was found that among the physical evidence, six strands of hair found on the van of Rivera's friend, which were believed to be the hairs of Jazvac, were proven to not belong to the victim, and more forensic tests could be conducted on the other evidence. Given the outcome of the testing, the defense counsel handling Rivera's case raised the possibility of achieving a new trial for their client.

On September 11, 2003, Rivera's post-conviction appeal was dismissed by the Florida Supreme Court. The court found that the testing results and other information not presented to the trial jury were not sufficient to cast doubts over his guilt and question the validity of his conviction.

On November 25, 2015, Rivera's appeal was rejected by the Florida Supreme Court.

On December 20, 2018, the Florida Supreme Court denied Rivera's appeal to overturn his conviction and his re-sentencing request. They found that in spite of the errors discovered in his case, Rivera's conviction and sentence were still safe to uphold and given that his sentence was unanimously imposed and later finalized in 1990, Rivera was not entitled to be re-sentenced under a new law that only allow unanimous jury verdicts to impose the death penalty in Florida. The law was only in effect for another five years before the law was amended again in 2023 to allow non-unanimous jury votes from eight or more jurors to impose death sentences.

== Death row ==
As of 2026, Michael Rivera remains on death row at the Union Correctional Institution.

In March 2024, it was reported that many of Florida's death row prisoners had outlived the judges who originally sentenced them to death, and Rivera was one of these inmates. In Rivera's case, Broward Judge John Ferris sentenced Rivera to death in 1987, and 14 years later, Ferris died at the age of 79 in 2001.

== See also ==
- Capital punishment in Florida
- List of death row inmates in the United States § Florida
