= Markeith Loyd =

American convicted murderer (born 1975)

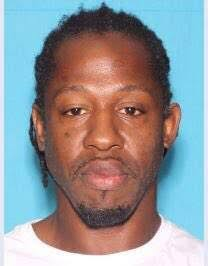
- Loyd, c. 2017
- Born: Markeith Demangzlo Loyd; October 8, 1975 (age 51)
- Occupation: Numerous unspecified jobs
- Convictions: First degree murder (2 counts); First degree murder of an unborn child Attempted first degree murder (3 counts); Aggravated assault Carjacking; Possession of a firearm by a convicted felon
- Penalty: Death

Details
- Victims: 2 killed, 1 injured
- Country: United States
- State: Florida
- Weapon: .40 Caliber pistol
- Date apprehended: January 17, 2017
- Imprisoned at: Union Correctional Institution

Markeith Demangzlo Loyd (born October 8, 1975) is an American convicted murderer who was sentenced to death for the murder of Orlando Police Lieutenant Debra Clayton. Loyd was found guilty in November for the January 2017 killing of Lt. Clayton and was sentenced to death following a unanimous jury recommendation in December. At the time of his sentencing, he was already serving a life sentence for the murder of his pregnant ex-girlfriend, Sade Dixon, whom he killed a month prior to Clayton's murder. Loyd was apprehended while on the run for Dixon's murder after a shopper at a Walmart spotted him and alerted Lt. Clayton, who was also at the store. A shootout ensued, resulting in Clayton's death.

During the trial, it was revealed that Loyd shot Clayton four times, with the fatal shot fired as he stood over her in the parking lot. Clayton was posthumously promoted from sergeant to lieutenant. Loyd's defence argued that he was acting in self-defence and was insane at the time of the shooting, believing that the police were trying to kill him. His mental health has been a subject of scrutiny throughout the legal proceedings. Loyd also claimed self-defence in the shooting of Dixon and her brother, who was injured. The police helicopter footage of his arrest stirred up controversy as it showed police kicking and beating him while he lay prone on his belly and complying with officer commands. He sustained multiple injuries, including the loss of his left eye, and was repeatedly refused medical treatment during his interrogation despite multiple requests.

== Timeline ==
=== Murder of Sade Dixon ===
On the night of December 13, 2016, 24-year-old Sade Dixon, a pregnant mother of two children aged 2 and 8, was shot and killed at her home in the Pine Hills area of Orange County. Dixon was three months pregnant at the time of her death. Markeith, Dixon's 41-year-old ex-boyfriend, was identified as the suspect and was considered armed and dangerous.

According to the Orange County Sheriff's Office, Loyd arrived at Dixon's home around 9:15 p.m. and knocked on the door. When Dixon opened the door, Loyd shot her eight times. Witnesses reported hearing around 10 gunshots. Dixon's 26-year-old brother, Ronald Steward, heard the commotion and attempted to intervene, only to be shot by Loyd as well. Steward was taken to Orlando Regional Medical Center in critical condition but was expected to make a full recovery.

Dixon's parents, Stephanie Dixon-Daniels and Ron Dixon, held a news conference urging the shooter to turn himself in. They described their daughter as a "phenomenal woman" who was hard-working, dedicated, unique, and strong-minded. The family also called for an end to the violence, stating that retaliation would not bring their daughter back.

=== Encounter and murder of Lt. Debra Clayton ===
On the morning of January 9, 2017, around 7:15 a.m., Lt. Debra Clayton was leaving a Walmart on John Young Parkway when a woman informed her that Markeith Loyd, who was wanted for the murder of his pregnant ex-girlfriend Sade Dixon, was in line at the store. Loyd was dressed in camouflage pants, black shoes, and a black shirt with the word "Security" printed on it. He was also wearing a bulletproof vest similar to those used by the Orlando Police Department.

According to police reports, Clayton pursued Loyd, who drew his gun and fired three rounds at her as she turned to run toward the parking lot. One bullet struck Clayton in her right hip, causing her to fall and hit her face on the pavement. While on the ground, Clayton fired seven shots at Loyd, who circled around her and fired multiple rounds. Clayton was struck four times: once in the hip, another bullet shattered her hipbone, one in the thigh, and the fatal shot went through her neck and lodged in her shoulder. The Medical Examiner's Office determined that the fatal shot was fired while Loyd stood over Clayton.

Three officers attempted CPR on Clayton until paramedics arrived and took her to Orlando Regional Medical Center, where she was pronounced dead at 7:40 a.m. Both Clayton and Loyd fired their weapons eight times during the exchange. Loyd used the same gun that he had used to kill Sade Dixon.

After the shooting, Loyd fled the scene in a dark green Mercury. He later fired shots at a deputy in an unmarked car and carjacked a 2013 Volkswagen Passat at gunpoint. The car was later found abandoned at Brookside Apartments with Loyd's clothes inside. A hole in his shirt indicated that he had been shot in the chest, but his bulletproof vest prevented any injury.

=== Death of Deputy First Class Norman Lewis ===
On January 9, 2017, during the extensive manhunt for Markeith Loyd, Orange County Sheriff's Office Deputy First Class Norman Lewis was killed in a traffic accident. Lewis, 35, was a University of Central Florida alumnus and former football player for the UCF Knights. He was riding a motorcycle when a Honda van, driven by 78-year-old Billie Jarrard, collided with him at 9:43 a.m. on Pine Hills Road.

Lewis was thrown from his 2014 Harley-Davidson motorcycle and was taken to Orlando Regional Medical Center in critical condition. He was pronounced dead shortly before 11 a.m. Orange County Sheriff Jerry Demings described Lewis as a "gentle giant" who was "very well known" and "very well liked." Demings also stated that Lewis was working "in concert" with the efforts to locate Loyd.

Billie Jarrard was later given a one thousand dollar fine and a six month driver's license suspension.

=== National attention and ongoing efforts ===
On January 17, 2017, Markeith Loyd was added to the U.S. Marshals Service list of the top 15 most wanted individuals in the nation. The U.S. Marshals Service also added $25,000 to the existing $100,000 reward for information leading to Loyd's arrest.

Orlando Police Chief John Mina expressed frustration over the fact that Loyd had not yet been captured, despite receiving more than 1,400 tips. Some of these tips led authorities to believe that Loyd had attempted to disguise himself by shaving his head. A digitally altered photo of Loyd without hair was released to aid in his identification. Loyd was described as weighing between 180 and 200 pounds and being over 6 feet tall, with a raised scar on his left hand.

Chief Mina emphasized that the search for Loyd would continue relentlessly. "We just need that right piece of information to bring him in," Mina said. Authorities warned the public not to approach Loyd, as he was considered armed and dangerous.

=== Capture and arrest ===
On January 17, 2017, Markeith Loyd was captured and arrested by Orlando police. He was found in an abandoned house on 1157 Lescot Lane in Carver Shores. Loyd emerged from the house wearing body armor and armed with two guns, one of which had a 100-round capacity. He initially tried to escape through the back of the house but eventually surrendered at the front door, dropping his firearms.

Helicopter footage showed Loyd crawling on his stomach toward police officers surrounding the residence. During the arrest, one officer appeared to kick Loyd, who was lying flat on his stomach. Police Chief John Mina held a news conference to address the content of the video and provide further details on Loyd's arrest. Mina stated that officers were concerned Loyd may have been hiding something in his body armor. A large bag of ammunition was found underneath Loyd when he was apprehended.

Loyd did not comply with officers' demands to put his hands behind his back, leading to the use of force. Mina stood behind the actions of the arresting officers and stated that an investigation into the use of force would be conducted. All officers involved in the arrest remained on duty. Orlando Police Chief John Mina announced that Loyd was arrested using the handcuffs of Lt. Debra Clayton, the officer he is accused of killing. This act was described as a long-standing tradition in law enforcement to honor fallen officers.

Loyd was taken to Orlando Regional Medical Center for treatment of minor facial injuries before being transferred to Orange County Jail. No law enforcement officers were injured during his capture.

During his first court appearance, Loyd appeared with a bandage over his left eye, abrasions, and swelling on his face. He claimed that his eye was taken, his nose and jaw were broken, and accused the police of excessive force. Mina, however, described Loyd's injuries as minor and stated that more charges would be filed no later than Monday in relation to Clayton's death.

Orange County Sheriff Jerry Demings announced that Loyd would be charged with two counts of first-degree murder with a firearm, two counts of aggravated assault with a firearm, and one count of attempted murder. Additional charges were expected.

Despite a $125,000 reward offered for information leading to Loyd's arrest, sources indicated that no one would be rewarded the Crimeline money, as the arrest was due to law enforcement investigative tactics.

Orange County Commissioner Regina Hill expressed gratitude to the various levels of law enforcement involved in Loyd's capture, stating she is "forever grateful for them bringing this cold-blooded killer to justice."

== Trial and death sentence ==
Markeith Loyd was sentenced to death for the fatal shooting of Orlando Police Lt. Debra Clayton in January 2017. A jury had found Loyd, aged 46, guilty in November and unanimously recommended a death sentence during a hearing in December. Circuit Judge Leticia Marques announced the sentence during a brief hearing. Loyd was already serving a life sentence for the murder of his pregnant ex-girlfriend, Sade Dixon, which occurred a month before Clayton's death. The prosecution had also sought a death sentence in that case, but Loyd received a life term after the jury unanimously voted against a death sentence.

During the trial, Loyd's mental health was a significant issue. He claimed to have acted in self-defense and that he was insane at the time of the shooting. Despite clinical psychologists testifying that Loyd suffered from delusional beliefs, the judge ruled that he was competent to continue with the sentencing hearing.

The defense also argued that Loyd had suffered brain damage during his arrest, where he lost an eye. However, the officers involved were cleared of any wrongdoing.

Orlando Police Chief Orlando Rolón stated, "Although nothing can undo the heartache created by the defendant's heinous actions, we hope that this brings solace to our community, knowing a dangerous murderer will face the highest penalty provided by the law."

Loyd is currently housed at Union Correctional Institution.

=== Florida Supreme Court hears death penalty appeal ===
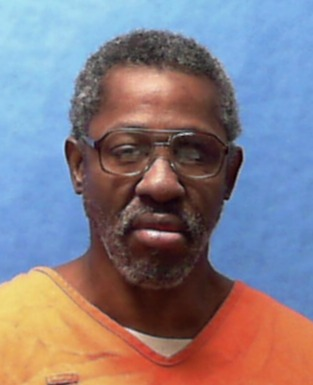
Loyd on death row

On April 26, 2022, the Florida Supreme Court heard oral arguments for an appeal by Lloyd, who was sentenced to death in March 2022. The appeal was heard in Tallahassee, where assistant public defender Nancy Ryan and state prosecutor Doris Meacham presented their arguments.

Ryan argued that the state had misled the jury and made misstatements that should be considered "structural errors." She contended that the prosecutor minimized the role of jurors in Florida's capital sentencing process and misstated the law defining premeditation. Ryan also criticized the use of music played over photos of Lt. Debra Clayton as an attempt to elicit an emotional response from the jury.

Meacham countered that many of the defense's claims were taken out of context. She said the prosecutor did not tell the jurors they were obligated to come to a unanimous verdict but should "try their best" to do so. Meacham also argued that the prosecutor did not tell the jury to disregard Loyd's mental capacity but reminded them that a judge had rejected his insanity claim.

The justices did not conclude that the music had any effect on the jury's decision. Florida Supreme Court spokesperson Paul Flemming stated that there is no schedule for a final disposition and that the court would continue to deliberate on the case.

== See also ==
- List of death row inmates in the United States § Florida
