= Murder of Seath Jackson =

2011 murder of a 15-year-old teenager in Florida

Seath Tyler Jackson
- Seath Jackson prior to his death
- Born: February 3, 1996; Ocala, Florida, U.S.
- Died: April 17, 2011 (aged 15); Summerfield, Florida, U.S.
- Cause of death: Fatal gunshot wounds
- Education: Belleview High School
- Known for: Murder victim
- Parents: Scott Jackson (father); Sonia Jackson (mother)
- Relatives: Two older brothers

The murder of Seath Tyler Jackson (February 3, 1996 – April 17, 2011) occurred on April 17, 2011, in Summerfield, Florida, United States. On that day, a group of five youths attacked and assaulted 15-year-old Jackson after one of them, Jackson's ex-girlfriend, lured him to a friend's house in Summerfield. Jackson was ultimately shot to death before his body was burned and the ashes disposed of in a rock quarry.

The five youths were later all arrested and charged with the murder of Jackson. Among the five, the 18-year-old ringleader Michael Shane Bargo Jr. (also the shooter) was found guilty of first-degree murder and sentenced to death. The remaining four were all sentenced to life imprisonment for first-degree murder, although one of them was eventually released after having her conviction vacated and pleading guilty to lesser charges of second-degree murder.

== Murder ==
A few months prior to his murder, the victim, 15-year-old Seath Tyler Jackson, began dating his then 15-year-old girlfriend Amber Wright in December 2010, but by March 2011, the couple had suffered a bitter breakup. Wright subsequently began dating 18-year-old Michael Shane Bargo Jr., who wrongfully believed that Jackson had abused Wright. Jackson's social media posts dated in early March 2011 showed presumed signs of affection for Wright, but later posts seemed to scornfully suggest Wright had been cheating on him with Bargo.

During the final weeks before the murder, Bargo and Jackson argued and threatened one another, and at one point, during a quarrel at Jackson's house, Bargo purportedly claimed that he had "a bullet with your [Jackson] name on it". Bargo would formulate a plan to murder Jackson, with Wright and her brother, 16-year-old Kyle Hooper, and their friends, 18-year-old Charlie Ely and 20-year-old Justin Soto joining him in the plot. Court documents revealed that Hooper, who was initially a close friend of Jackson, had fallen out with him due to the break-up between Jackson and Wright. Moreover, Hooper had purportedly caught Jackson in bed with a girl Hooper liked, and Hooper admitted to a friend in text messages that he wanted to murder Jackson.

On April 17, 2011, the day of the murder, under the instructions of Bargo, Wright called Jackson and claimed she wished to reconcile with him and rekindle their relationship. Jackson believed Wright and was thus lured into Ely's house in Summerfield. After arriving there, Jackson was attacked by the five youths. During the attack, Jackson was beaten, hit on the head, and shot, but still tried to escape the house. Soto used an axe handle to strike Jackson, and the boys carried him back inside the house and placed him in a bathtub. Bargo then shot Jackson to death, and the victim's body was placed inside a sleeping bag, before being left in an active backyard fire pit for several hours. On the morning of April 18, 2011, James Havens, the 37-year-old "stepfather" of Wright and Hooper, arrived at the house, where he assisted the youths in disposing of Jackson's ashes. The ashes were placed into 5-gallon paint cans and then dumped in a water-filled rock quarry in Ocala, Florida. The youths also cleaned the house with bleach to get rid of Jackson's blood.

== Participants ==
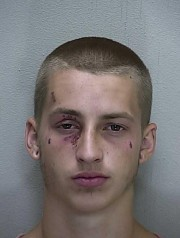
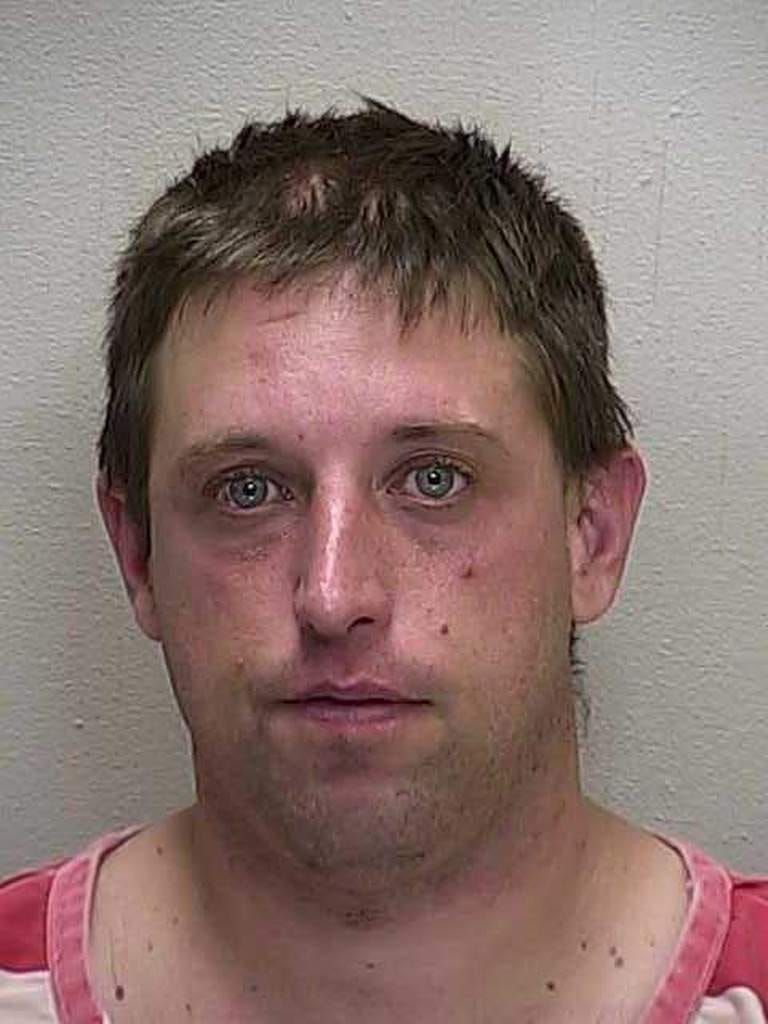
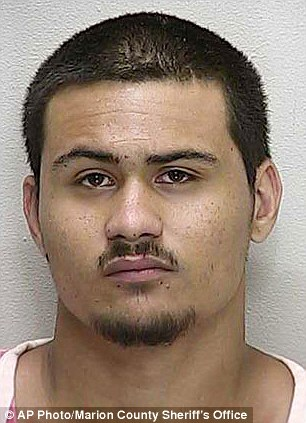
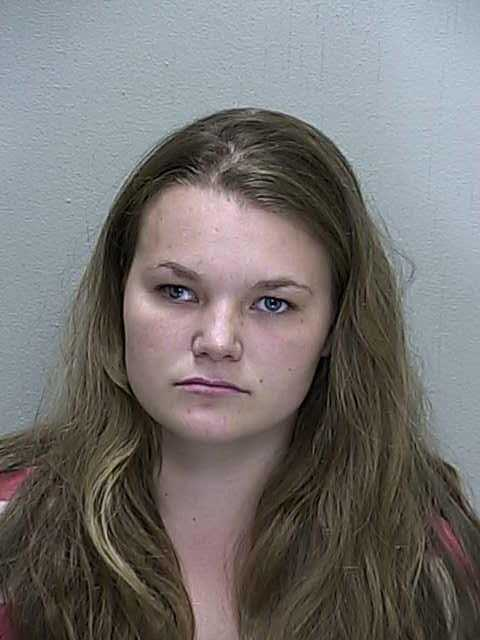
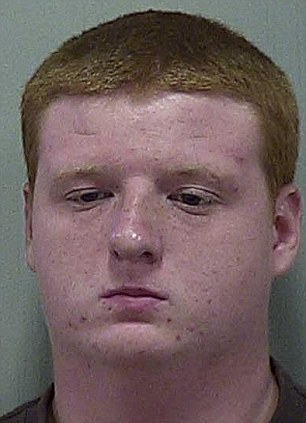
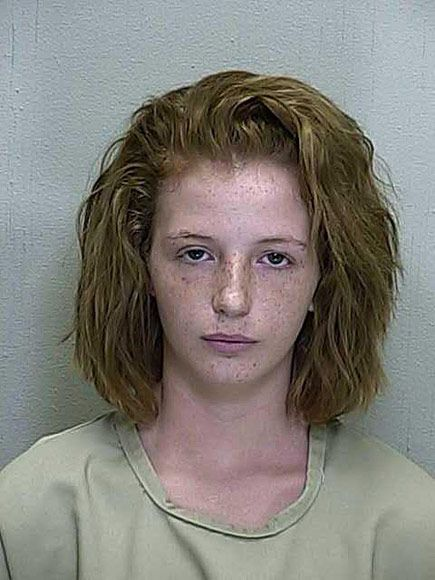
- Top left: Michael Bargo, the ringleader of the five who directly shot and killed Jackson.
- Top right: James Havens, the oldest involved in the murder of Jackson.
- Middle left: Justin Soto, the oldest of the five youths involved in the murder of Jackson.
- Middle right: Charlie Ely, the first to be convicted for Jackson's murder.
- Bottom left: Kyle Hooper, one of the two juveniles convicted of Jackson's murder.
- Bottom right: Amber Wright, one of the two juveniles convicted of Jackson's murder.
1. Michael Shane Bargo Jr. (born April 29, 1992) – aged 18, charged with first-degree premeditated murder with a firearm.
2. Amber Elizabeth Wright (born March 29, 1996) – aged 15, charged with first-degree murder.
3. Kyle Lonnie-Duan Hooper (born July 19, 1994) – aged 16, charged with first-degree murder.
4. Justin Edward Soto (born January 4, 1991) – aged 20, charged with first-degree murder.
5. Charlie Kay Ely (born July 11, 1992) – aged 18, charged with second-degree murder. Released in 2020.
6. James Young Havens III (born 1973 or 1974) – aged 37, charged with accessory to first-degree murder.

== Murder charges ==
On April 18, 2011, Jackson's mother reported her son missing. Investigators were able to quickly link the perpetrators to the crime, and on April 20, all six were arrested. The five youths were charged with first-degree murder, while 37-year-old James Havens was charged as an accessory. Under Florida state law, offenders convicted of first-degree murder could face the death penalty or life imprisonment without parole.

A few days after the arrest of his killers, a memorial service was held for Jackson, with more than 370 mourners in attendance.

On May 4, 2011, all five youths were formally indicted by a grand jury for first-degree murder, with both Hooper and Wright charged and set to stand trial as adults.

On July 6, 2011, the prosecution confirmed that they would seek the death penalty against Bargo, who was deemed to be the ringleader and shooter.

James Havens, who was initially ruled mentally incompetent to stand trial in 2014, eventually pleaded guilty in 2018, and faced the maximum sentence of 30 years in prison as an accessory to first-degree murder.

== Trial of the youths ==
=== Charlie Ely ===
On September 23, 2011, Charlie Ely was found guilty of first-degree murder by a Marion County jury, becoming the first of the five to be convicted for killing Seath Jackson.

On October 17, 2011, circuit Judge David Eddy sentenced Ely to life imprisonment without the possibility of parole, plus a $5,000 fine.

In June 2020 she was released after serving nine years. An appeal to her conviction set in motion her release after her life sentence was vacated.

She was arrested again in 2024 for Domestic Violence/Battery.

=== Justin Soto ===
On May 30, 2012, Justin Soto was the second of the five to be convicted after he pleaded guilty to first-degree murder, an act done to avoid a potential death sentence. As the prosecution were undecided about whether to pursue the death penalty for Soto, circuit Judge David Eddy sentenced Soto to life without parole, thus allowing Soto to be spared the death sentence.

As of 2025, Soto is incarcerated at the Taylor Correctional Institution.

=== Kyle Hooper and Amber Wright ===
On June 6, 2012, Amber Wright and Kyle Hooper stood trial together before two separate juries for their roles in the murder.

On June 12, 2012, both Hooper and Wright were found guilty by their respective juries for first-degree murder. Given the fact that both siblings were under the age of 18 when the murder was committed, they were not eligible for the death penalty, but faced the maximum sentence of life in prison without parole.

On August 22, 2012, circuit Judge David Eddy sentenced both Hooper and Wright to life without parole. However, this verdict was complicated by the fact that both siblings were juveniles at the time of the offense. The sentencing directly conflicted with a landmark U.S. Supreme Court ruling that had recently barred the mandatory imposition of life without parole for minors, declaring the practice unconstitutional in June 2012. Furthermore, at the time of the siblings' sentencing, there was no state law to set statutory guidelines in sentencing juveniles for crimes punishable by life without parole, which was the only sentence Judge Eddy was bound to pass on the duo for first-degree murder.

As of 2026, Hooper is incarcerated at Everglades Correctional Institution and Wright is incarcerated at Homestead Correctional Institution.

=== Michael Bargo ===
On August 20, 2013, the jury found Bargo guilty of first-degree murder, making him the last of the five perpetrators to be convicted of murdering Jackson.

A week after his conviction, on August 27, 2013, by a majority vote of 10–2, the jury recommended Bargo to be sentenced to death.

On December 13, 2013, Bargo was sentenced to death by Judge David Eddy, who described Jackson's murder as the "most cold, calculated and premeditated case" he ever presided in his 32 years of judicial service. Bargo became the youngest person to be condemned to Florida's death row, which also incarcerated 403 other prisoners at the time of his sentencing. As of 2026, Bargo is currently being held at Union Correctional Institution.

== Appeals ==
=== Amber Wright and Kyle Hooper ===
On May 30, 2014, the Florida 5th District Court of Appeal allowed the appeals of both Kyle Hooper and Amber Wright, vacating the former's life sentence in favour of a re-sentencing hearing while ordering a re-trial for the latter. The court found that Wright should be re-tried due the police's failure to advise her of her Miranda rights. As for Hooper, the court found that the sentencing had to conform with the guidelines required to sentence juveniles to life, where they were entitled to the possibility of parole.

On January 14, 2016, following a re-trial before another jury, Wright was found guilty once again for the first-degree murder of Seath Jackson.

On February 23, 2016, Wright was once again sentenced to life in prison, but was entitled to the possibility of parole after serving 25 years of her life sentence.

On December 8, 2016, circuit Judge Anthony Tatti sentenced Hooper to life imprisonment with the possibility of parole after 25 years.

As of 2025, following their re-sentencing hearings, Wright is detained at the Homestead Correctional Institution, while Hooper is imprisoned at the Everglades Correctional Institution.

=== Charlie Ely ===
After her conviction and trial, Charlie Ely filed an appeal, stating that she was represented by ineffective counsel during her trial. Eventually, in March 2020, U.S. District Judge Roy B. Dalton Jr. allowed the appeal of Ely and accepted her claims of ineffective counsel. As a result, Ely was ordered to receive a re-trial.

On June 17, 2020, Ely pleaded guilty to lesser charges of second-degree murder and was re-sentenced to ten years in prison. On account of her good behavior in prison and the time served, Ely was released from prison immediately after her sentencing.

=== Michael Bargo ===
As of his sentencing in December 2013, Michael Shane Bargo Jr. was one of eight prisoners incarcerated on Florida's death row for murders committed in Marion County.

==== First appeal and vacatur of death sentence ====
In December 2014, Bargo filed an appeal to the Florida Supreme Court, seeking to overturn his murder conviction and death sentence.

On June 29, 2017, the Florida Supreme Court allowed Michael Bargo's appeal against his death sentence, overturned it, and ordered Bargo to undergo a re-sentencing trial. The court's decision was made in light of the 2017 reforms to Florida's death penalty laws, which decreed that death sentences could only be issued based on unanimous jury verdicts, thus overturning the state's previous requisite of non-unanimous death penalty verdicts by the jury (at least seven jurors were needed to agree on a death sentence).

This new law, however, was only in effect for roughly six years, as in April 2023, Florida's statutes were once again reformed to allow the death penalty if at least eight out of twelve jurors voted in favor. This reform was partly due to mass shooter Nikolas Cruz escaping the death penalty for murdering 17 students and school staff members during a 2018 school shooting, after which the jury failed to unanimously agree on a death sentence.

==== Re-sentencing ====
On April 3, 2019, Bargo's re-sentencing trial began before another jury, and the prosecution once again sought the death penalty for Bargo.

On April 10, 2019, the jury unanimously recommended Bargo to be sentenced to death for murdering Jackson.

On September 12, 2019, circuit Judge Anthony Tatti formally reinstated the death penalty for Bargo.

==== Further appeals ====
On June 24, 2021, Bargo's second appeal against his death sentence was denied by the Florida Supreme Court.

As of 2026, Bargo is awaiting execution at the Union Correctional Institution.

== Aftermath ==
In 2021, the true crime documentary series Sleeping With a Killer re-enacted the murder of Seath Jackson and it aired as the 12th episode of the show's first season.

== See also ==
- Capital punishment in Florida
- List of death row inmates in the United States § Florida
- List of solved missing person cases (2010s)
