= List of death row inmates in the United States =

As of October 1, 2026, there were 1,977 death row inmates in the United States, including 45 women. The number of death row inmates changes frequently with new convictions, appellate decisions overturning conviction or sentence alone, commutations, or deaths (through execution or otherwise).

== Demographics ==
Total number of people on death row, in 2024, per US state, as of September 12, 2024

Number of people on death row, per 10,000,000 inhabitants, in 2024, per US state, as of September 12, 2024

=== Number on death row by jurisdiction ===
- California: 576
- Florida: 233
- Texas: 162
- Alabama: 154
- North Carolina: 122
- Arizona: 107
- Ohio: 106
- Pennsylvania: 94
- Nevada: 57
- Louisiana: 55
- Tennessee: 40
- Mississippi: 35
- Georgia: 33
- Oklahoma: 25
- Kentucky: 24
- South Carolina: 23
- Arkansas: 23
- Nebraska: 12
- Kansas: 9
- Idaho: 8
- Missouri: 8
- Indiana: 4
- U.S. Military: 4
- Utah: 3
- Federal Government: 3
- Montana: 2
- South Dakota: 1
- New Hampshire: 1
- Wyoming: 0
- Oregon: 0

=== Ethnicity of defendants on death row ===
- White: 820 (41.90%)
- African-American: 784 (40.06%)
- Hispanic: 297 (15.18%)
- Asian: 37 (1.89%)
- Native American: 19 (0.97%)

Comparatively, 61.63% of the U.S. population is White, 18.7% is Hispanic, 12.40% is African-American, 7.24% is Asian, and 2.92% is Native American.

=== Gender of defendants on death row ===
- Male: 1,914 (97.70%)
- Female: 45 (2.30%)

Comparatively, 50.8% of the U.S. population is female, and 49.2% is male.

=== Education ===
- 69.75% have less than a high school diploma or GED.

Comparatively, 12.19% of U.S. adults have less than a high school diploma or GED.

=== Time on death row ===
- Median time, in years, a death row prisoner has been awaiting execution: 6 (2014)
- Average time, in years, between imposition of a death sentence and execution: 12 (2014)
  - For people executed in 2024: 25 years on average between offense and execution.

=== Later found innocent or exonerated ===
- As of early 2026, over 2% of all persons that had been sentenced to death row since 1972 have been formally exonerated and released (202 total). (Note: Posthumous exonerations (persons whose innocence was formally acknowledged after execution or death) are not included.)

== List of death row inmates by jurisdiction ==
=== Federal ===
- On death row: 3 (as of December 23, 2024)
- Total number executed: 228 (1790–2021)

Name	Crime	Time on death row	Imprisoned at	Register number	Notes
Robert Gregory Bowers	Perpetrator of the Pittsburgh synagogue shooting; an antisemitic terrorist attack in which eleven people were murdered.	3 years, 111 days	USP Terre Haute	39188-068	The shooting was the deadliest attack on the Jewish community in the United States.
Dylann Storm Roof	Perpetrator of the Charleston church shooting on June 17, 2015, which killed nine African Americans.	9 years, 316 days	USP Terre Haute	28509-171	American mass murderer and white supremacist who, during a prayer service at Emanuel African Methodist Episcopal Church, sat down with his future victims for approximately 45 minutes before pulling out a Glock 41 .45-caliber handgun. Among those people who were killed was the senior pastor and state senator Clementa C. Pinckney. Roof is the first person on death row for federal hate crimes.
Dzhokhar Anzorovich Tsarnaev	Co-perpetrator of the Boston Marathon bombing which killed three people and injured 264 runners and spectators.	11 years, 151 days	ADX Florence	95079-038	Chechen-American, Islamic terrorism inspired lone wolf who, along with his brother Tamerlan Tsarnaev, perpetrated the attack. Tamerlan later died due to critical injuries and massive blood loss during a shootout with police on April 19, 2013. On July 31, 2020, Tsarnaev's death sentence was overturned on appeal, but was reinstated by the US Supreme Court two years later.

=== Military ===
- On death row: 4
- Total number executed: 317 (1917–1961) & numerous others convicted of varying offences against US forces during and after World War II

Name	Crime	Time on death row	Notes
Hasan Karim Akbar (born as Mark Fidel Kools)	Murdered two commissioned officers and wounded 11 other servicemen during an attack in Kuwait on March 23, 2003 after throwing a hand grenade and opening fire upon his fellow troops.	21 years, 205 days	
Ronald Adrin Gray	Raped and murdered multiple women at Fort Bragg, North Carolina, from December 15, 1986, to January 6, 1987. His convictions include 4 counts of murder and 8 counts of rape	38 years, 146 days	Gray is the military's longest-serving death row inmate. His most recent appeals were denied by the Court of Appeals for the Armed Forces in 2017. The U.S. Supreme Court declined to review Gray's case in 2018.
Nidal Malik Hasan	Perpetrator of the 2009 Fort Hood shooting.	13 years, 86 days	Convicted on 13 counts of premeditated murder and 32 counts of attempted murder. Scheduled to be executed by firing squad on December 3, 2026.
Timothy Baily Hennis	Raped and murdered Kathryn Eastburn, and murdered Kathryn's two daughters, Kara and Erin Eastburn in 1985.	16 years, 221 days	Previously convicted in 1986 by the State of North Carolina, retried and acquitted in 1989, and widely reported as exonerated; recalled to active duty for military court martial (as he had been in the U.S. Army at the time of the murders) under separate sovereignty (see Double jeopardy).

=== Alabama ===
- On death row: 153 (as of September 17, 2026)
- Total number executed: 786 (1800–2025)

Due to the number of Alabama death row inmates, only prisoners with Wikipedia pages are listed.

Name	Description of crime	Time on death row	Other
Nicholas Acklin	Shot and murdered four people in 1996 inside a house in Huntsville, Alabama.	28 years, 16 days	Acklin, Wilson and a third man named Corey Johnson shot and killed the four victims and also injured two others over a dispute regarding a stolen cellphone. Acklin and Wilson were both sentenced to death in 1998. Johnson was convicted of felony murder and sentenced to 15 years' jail after reaching a plea bargain, and released in 2011, before he was arrested and sentenced to life in prison for the 2016 murder of his girlfriend.
Joey Wilson	Shot and murdered four people in 1996 inside a house in Huntsville, Alabama.	28 years, 66 days	Acklin, Wilson and a third man named Corey Johnson shot and killed the four victims and also injured two others over a dispute regarding a stolen cellphone. Acklin and Wilson were both sentenced to death in 1998. Johnson was convicted of felony murder and sentenced to 15 years' jail after reaching a plea bargain, and released in 2011, before he was arrested and sentenced to life in prison for the 2016 murder of his girlfriend.
Donald Broadnax	Murdered his wife, 42-year-old Hector Jan Stamps, and her grandson, 4-year-old DeAngelo Marquez Stamps.	29 years, 71 days	The crimes were committed while he was on work release from a previous murder conviction.
Jimmy Lee Brooks Jr.	Kidnapped and murdered 12-year-old Brett Bowyer in February 2002.	22 years, 227 days	Both Brooks and Carruth posed as narcotics officers and entered the home of Bowyer and his father Butch, kidnapping and robbing them before they shot Bowyer and slit Butch's throat and buried them both in a shallow grave. Butch survived his wound and dug himself out of the grave to seek help, leading to the men's arrests. The pair were also involved in an unrelated double murder of a married couple in January 2002.
Michael David Carruth	Kidnapped and murdered 12-year-old Brett Bowyer in February 2002.	22 years, 352 days	Both Brooks and Carruth posed as narcotics officers and entered the home of Bowyer and his father Butch, kidnapping and robbing them before they shot Bowyer and slit Butch's throat and buried them both in a shallow grave. Butch survived his wound and dug himself out of the grave to seek help, leading to the men's arrests. The pair were also involved in an unrelated double murder of a married couple in January 2002.
John Joseph DeBlase	Murdered four-year-old Natalie DeBlase and three-year-old Chase DeBlase, the biological children of John DeBlase and stepchildren of Leavell-Keaton	11 years, 318 days	On two separate occasions in March and June 2010 respectively, Natalie and Chase were being poisoned with antifreeze and also bound and gagged with tape, and died from the abuse. The children's bodies were found buried in Alabama and Mississippi. Leavell-Keaton was the first woman to be given the death penalty in Mobile County.
Heather Leavell-Keaton	Murdered four-year-old Natalie DeBlase and three-year-old Chase DeBlase, the biological children of John DeBlase and stepchildren of Leavell-Keaton	11 years, 94 days	On two separate occasions in March and June 2010 respectively, Natalie and Chase were being poisoned with antifreeze and also bound and gagged with tape, and died from the abuse. The children's bodies were found buried in Alabama and Mississippi. Leavell-Keaton was the first woman to be given the death penalty in Mobile County.
Thomas Dale Ferguson	Murdered 11-year-old Joey Pugh and his 41-year-old father Harold Pugh in Cane Creek Canyon Nature Preserve, Alabama.	28 years, 75 days	Ferguson and Maxwell and three other men intended to rob the Pughs of their truck in order to commit a bank robbery in Mississippi, and both Ferguson and Maxwell shot the father-son pair to death. Maxwell was sentenced to death by a 10–2 vote from the jury, while Ferguson was sentenced to death by the judge despite the jury's 11-1 majority vote for life imprisonment. Two of the other co-accused were sentenced to life in prison while the final member was jailed for 15 years for robbery after he testified against the others.
Michael Craig Maxwell	Murdered 11-year-old Joey Pugh and his 41-year-old father Harold Pugh in Cane Creek Canyon Nature Preserve, Alabama.	28 years, 145 days	
Westley Devon Harris	Murdered six members of his girlfriend's family in 2002.	21 years, 102 days	Harris committed the murders out of anger towards his girlfriend's family for separating him and his girlfriend. Harris was originally sentenced to life without parole by the jury through a 7–5 vote, but the judge overrode the jury's recommendation and sentenced him to six death sentences for all six counts of capital murder.
Robert Shawn Ingram	Kidnapped and murdered 32-year-old Gregory Huguley by burning him to death in 1993.	31 years, 159 days	Ingram was one of four men convicted of the crime. One of his co-defendants, Anthony Todd Boyd, was sentenced to death and executed on October 23, 2025, after spending 30 years on death row. The remaining two other men, Quintay Cox and Marcel Ackles, were sentenced to life imprisonment. Cox was released on parole in 2009 while Ackles remains incarcerated as of 2026.
Shonelle Jackson	Murdered LeFrick Moore during the commission of a robbery.	25 years, 188 days	
Jeremy Bryan Jones	Raped and murdered 43-year-old Lisa Marie Nichols.	21 years, 27 days	Jones also confessed to committing twenty additional murders across four other states in a 12-year span. These confessions are considered dubious and he has since recanted them.
Courtney Lockhart	Kidnapped and murdered 18-year-old Auburn University freshman Lauren Burk.	15 years, 265 days	
Brian Lansing Martin	Shot and killed Sheffield police officer James "Nick" Risner.	26 days	Martin was previously convicted of manslaughter for killing his father. He is also believed to have killed his roommate before killing officer Risner.
Devin Moore	Murdered two police officers and a dispatcher.	21 years, 47 days	
Cuhuatemoc Peraita	Killed a fellow inmate in 1999.	25 years, 21 days	Peraita was originally serving life without parole for his role in the 1994 murders of three Popeyes restaurant workers. His accomplice was executed for these murders in 2017.
Ryan Clark Petersen	Killed three people during a nightclub shooting in 2012.	9 years, 243 days	Petersen committed the shooting in retaliation after he was driven out of the nightclub for unruly behavior. Petersen also shot and wounded a fourth person during the shooting. Petersen was convicted of three counts of capital murder and one count of attempted murder and sentenced to death.
Christie Michelle Scott	Killed her six-year-old autistic son Mason Scott by arson in 2008.	17 years, 109 days	Scott intentionally engineered the murder of her son Mason by starting a fire and disguising it as an accident. Scott's motive was to collect insurance money amounting to $175,000 through the death of Mason.
Jimmy O'Neal Spencer	Killed two elderly women and a seven-year-old boy during a robbery spree in July 2018.	4 years, 8 days	At the time of the triple murder, Spencer was out on parole since November 2017 after serving two life sentences for multiple convictions of burglary, assault and escape. Spencer's case also led to the drastic decrease in the rate of parole approvals for prisoners in Alabama.
Kerry Spencer	Killed three Birmingham police officers in 2004.	21 years, 60 days	Spencer shot all three officers and testified that he acted alone, but his alleged accomplice, Nathaniel Woods, was also sentenced to death. Woods was executed in 2020 in a highly publicized and controversial execution.

=== American Samoa ===
- On death row: 0
- Total number executed: 0 (since 1939)

Capital punishment exists as a punishment in American Samoa, an unincorporated territory of the United States, but does not have a prescribed method of execution. No executions have been imposed or performed since the territory gained self-governance in 1949; the last executions occurred in 1939, when the island was under the control of the United States Navy.

=== Arizona ===
- On death row: 108 (as of May 20, 2026)
- Total number executed: 146 (1800–2026)

Due to the number of Arizona death row inmates, only prisoners with Wikipedia pages are listed.

Name	Description of crime	Time on death row	Other
John Allen	Murder of Sammantha Allen's cousin, Ame Deal.	9 years, 6 days	On July 12, 2011, police officers were called to ten-year-old Ame Deal's home, where she was found dead in a small foot locker, having suffocated. Ame lived with a number of relatives, including her aunt and legal guardian, Cynthia Stoltzmann. Allen was Stoltzmann's daughter. The family first told the police officers that Ame was playing hide-n-seek and locked herself in the trunk the night before, after the adults went to sleep. During interrogation, Sammantha and her husband John confessed to locking Ame in the trunk as a form of punishment, because she took a popsicle without permission.
Sammantha Allen	Murder of Sammantha Allen's cousin, Ame Deal.	9 years, 107 days	
Trent Benson	Rapes and murders of two sex workers, 21-year-old Alisa Marie Beck and 44-year-old Karen Jane Campbell in Mesa, committed in 2004 and 2007, respectively.	15 years, 46 days	Benson is serving 135 years imprisonment for two unrelated sexual assaults, and police believe he might be responsible for further crimes.
Jason Eugene Bush	Murdered 29-year-old Raul Flores and his 9-year-old daughter, Brisenia, in Arivaca, Arizona, during a home invasion.	15 years, 230 days	Had ties with the Aryan Nations, a white supremacist group. Convicted for four murders in total, and two suspected killings in 1997, was sentenced to death and received 78 years for other crimes just one month after his death sentence.
Shawna Forde	Murdered 29-year-old Raul Flores and his 9-year-old daughter, Brisenia, in Arivaca, Arizona, during a home invasion.	15 years, 273 days	On May 30, 2009, Forde was active in the Minuteman movement, a grassroots anti-illegal immigration group that would station themselves along the U.S. southern border and keep watch for Mexicans crossing the border illegally and alert the Border Patrol. Forde allegedly boasted of robbing drug dealers to finance the movement. Prosecutors alleged Forde and her associates entered the trailer disguised as government officials looking for fugitives. No drugs were found in the trailer. Albert Gaxiola, who participated in the May 30, 2009 murders, received life without parole plus 54 years.
Cleophus Cooksey Jr.	Series of 8 murders between November and December 2017.	339 days	Suspected of a 9th killing in 2017. Convicted of a separate murder in 2001.
Mark Goudeau	Series of rapes and murders.	14 years, 357 days	Goudeau is a serial killer and rapist, referred to as the Baseline Killer by law enforcement and media prior to his identification. Goudeau is believed to have committed nine counts of first degree murder (eight women and one man), in addition to 15 sexual assaults on women and young girls, 11 counts of kidnapping, and a number of armed robberies.
Charles Michael Hedlund	Murdered 40-year-old Christine Mertens and 65-year-old James McClain in separate burglaries.	33 years, 115 days	Both defendants, who are half-brothers, were sentenced to death.
James Erin McKinney	Murdered 40-year-old Christine Mertens and 65-year-old James McClain in separate burglaries.	33 years, 122 days	Both defendants, who are half-brothers, were sentenced to death.
Scott Lehr	Kidnapped, raped and murdered Margaret Christorf in 1991 as well as Belinda Cronin and Michelle Morales in 1992.	29 years, 106 days	Also known as the “Baby Seat Rapist”. Lehr had raped a total of 20 women, three of whom later died from fatal head injuries.
Ernesto Salgado Martinez	Shot and murdered police officer Robert "Bob" Martin in 1995.	28 years, 96 days	Martinez was also convicted of the 1995 robbery-murder of Randip Singh in Blythe, California, and sentenced to life without parole.
Bryan Patrick Miller	Kidnapped, sexually assaulted and murdered Angela Brosso in 1992 as well as Melanie Bernas in 1993.	3 years, 138 days	Also known as the “Zombie Hunter” or “Canal Killer”. The murders were the first cold cases solved by genetic genealogy.
Cory Morris	Murdered five women between September 2002 and April 2003.	21 years, 126 days	Serial killer known as "The Crackhead Killer".
Scott Douglas Nordstrom	One of the two gunmen involved in the 1996 Tucson murders	28 years, 187 days (first sentence; overturned); 17 years, 55 days (second sentence)	Nordstrom was originally handed six death sentences in 1998, before his first death sentence was vacated for re-sentencing. Nordstrom was given two death sentences in his 2009 re-trial, in addition to four consecutive life terms without parole. Nordstrom's accomplice Robert Glen Jones Jr. was sentenced to death and executed on October 23, 2013. David Nordstrom, who was the get-away driver of the pair, was jailed for armed robbery after agreeing to testify against his brother and Jones in their respective murder trials.
Roger Mark Scott	Shooting death of 4-year-old Christopher Milke	35 years, 214 days	Co-defendants James Lynn Styers and the boy's mother Debra Milke were also sentenced to death. Milke's conviction was overturned in 2015.
Joseph Clarence Smith Jr.	Murders of Sandy Spencer and Neva Lee in 1975 and 1976 respectively	49 years, 83 days	Smith was also responsible for several rapes committed between 1973 and 1976. Smith was on probation for a 1973 rape case when he committed the murders. Smith is the state's longest-serving prisoner on death row.
Preston Strong	Murdered a family of six in 2005.	9 years, 200 days	Strong was already serving a life sentence for murdering a physician when he was sentenced to death.
James Lynn Styers	Shooting death of 4-year-old Christopher Milke	35 years, 343 days	Co-defendants Roger Mark Scott and the boy's mother Debra Milke were also sentenced to death. Milke's conviction was overturned in 2015.
Robert Lee Walden	Rape and murder of 31-year-old Miguela Burhans in her Tucson apartment on June 13, 1991.	33 years, 348 days	Walden is also serving five life terms for another murder and four rapes, all committed within the Tucson area from 1989 to 1991. He has also been linked to a third murder, for which he has never been charged.
Ronald Turney Williams	Murder of a man in 1981	42 years, 213 days	Williams is currently serving two life terms in West Virginia for the murders of two police officers, who were killed four years apart. He killed one of them in 1979 while escaping prison and was later captured after he killed the man in Arizona.

=== Arkansas ===
- On death row: 22 (as of October 26, 2026)
- Total number executed: 509 (1800–2017)

Due to the number of Arkansas death row inmates, only prisoners with Wikipedia pages are listed.

Name	Description of crime	Time on death row	Other
Randy William Gay	Shot and killed 49-year-old Connie Snow, a stranger with whom he had gotten into an argument.	11 years, 248 days	Had previously murdered his father-in-law and biological father in two separate incidents, in 1978 and 1991, respectively.
Zachary Holly	Abducted, raped and strangled 6-year-old Jersey Bridgeman.	11 years, 179 days	
Karl Douglas Roberts	Raped and murdered 12-year-old Andria “Andi” Brewer.	26 years, 187 days	Andria Brewer was the daughter of former Arkansas state representative Rebecca Petty, and the niece of Roberts.

=== California ===
- On death row: 576 (as of November 6, 2026)
- Total number executed: 722 (1778–2006)

=== Florida ===
- On death row: 234 (as of October 10, 2026)
- Total number executed: 454 (1827–2026)

Due to the number of Florida death row inmates, only prisoners with Wikipedia pages are listed.

Name	Description of crime	Time on death row	Other
Howard Ault	1996 murders of DeAnn Emerald Mu'min and Alicia Sybilla Jones in Fort Lauderdale, Florida.	26 years, 253 days	Ault, who had previous antecedents for sex crimes against minors, had lured the girls (who were sisters) to his apartment after promising them candy. Ault raped the older sister, Mu'min, before he murdered both girls by strangulation.
Peter Avsenew	2010 murders of a homosexual couple, Kevin Powell and Stephen Adams, in Wilton Manors, Florida.	8 years, 82 days (first sentence; overturned); 2 years, 349 days (second sentence)	Avsenew posted a sexually suggestive ad on Craiglist, which the couple responded and he was taken into their home, where he stayed for weeks before he shot them to death and stole their valuables.
Michael Shane Bargo Jr.	2011 murder of Seath Jackson in Summerfield, Florida.	13 years, 87 days	Bargo was the ringleader and one of the five youths involved in the murder of Jackson. The 5 youths beat, shot, dismembered and burned Seath Jackson. later they dumped his burnt body into a quarry. Three of Bargo' s accomplices (including two juveniles) were sentenced to life imprisonment for first-degree murder, while the fourth was convicted of second-degree murder and released after spending close to ten years in jail.
Leo Boatman	Murdered a fellow prisoner, William Chapman, in 2019	4 years, 13 days	Boatman was serving two life sentences without parole for the 2006 murders of Amber Peck and John Parker, and 15 years for the 2010 murder of Ricky Morris in prison.
William Edward Wells	Murdered a fellow prisoner, William Chapman, in 2019	5 years, 191 days	Wells, dubbed the "Monster of Mayport", was serving multiple life sentences without parole for the 2003 murders of his wife and four other people, and the 2011 murder of another inmate in prison.
Lucious Boyd	Kidnapped, raped and stabbed 21-year-old Dawnia Dacosta with a screwdriver.	24 years, 154 days	
Tina Lasonya Brown	Kidnapped and murdered 19-year-old Audreanna Zimmerman by beating and burning her alive in 2010.	14 years, 55 days	Brown's 16-year-old daughter Britnee Miller was sentenced to life in prison for first-degree murder, while Brown's neighbor Heather Lee accepted a plea deal and thus given 25 years' jail for second-degree murder. Brown is presently the sole woman incarcerated on Florida's death row since 2023.
Daniel Burns Jr.	Shot and murdered 28-year-old Florida Highway Patrol Trooper Jeffrey Young during a traffic stop in 1987.	38 years, 173 days (first sentence; overturned); 32 years, 139 days (second sentence)	Burns shot and killed Trooper Young to avoid arrest for cocaine trafficking. Burns was the oldest prisoner on Florida's death row as of 2026.
Rory Enrique Conde	Strangled six sex workers, including a male crossdresser, then had anal sex with their corpses.	26 years, 260 days	
Steven Anthony Cozzie	Kidnapped, raped and murdered 15-year-old Courtney Wilkes in 2011.	13 years, 36 days	Cozzie was sentenced to death for first-degree murder, in addition to double life sentences for aggravated battery with a deadly weapon and for kidnapping, plus 30 years' jail for aggravated child abuse.
Willie Crain Jr.	Kidnapped and murdered seven-year-old Amanda Brown in 1998.	27 years, 3 days	Prior to the murder, Crain had raped at least eight young girls from the 1960s to the 1980s, and sentenced to 20 years' jail in 1984 for five related charges, but he served only six years before being released. In the case of Brown's murder, the body was never found. Crain is scheduled to be executed on December 10, 2026.
Daniel Craven	2015 murder of his prison cellmate John H. Anderson at Graceville Correctional Facility.	8 years, 71 days	At the time of Anderson's murder, Craven was already serving life without parole for the 2011 murder of his romantic rival Ronald Justice. Craven, who identified himself as a white supremacist, murdered Anderson, who was African-American, in order to inspire and spark a racial war between inmates of different races.
Mesac Damas	Murder of his wife and five children at their home.	9 years, 26 days	Killed his wife and their five children after she mentioned wanting a divorce. Received six death sentences.
Leon Davis Jr.	Murders of four people.	15 years, 207 days	He was given an additional life sentence for killing the unborn child of one of the victims
Wayne C. Doty	Murder of fellow inmate Xavier Rodriguez in 2013.	13 years, 171 days (first sentence; overturned); 8 years, 191 days (second sentence)	Before killing Rodriguez, Doty was already serving life without parole for the murder of Harvey Horne II in 1996. Has selected electrocution as his method of execution. William Edward Wells was also convicted as an accomplice in Rodriguez's murder and sentenced to life without parole, but later received a death sentence for another inmate's murder in 2019.
Dwight Eaglin	Convicted of the 2003 murders of corrections officer Darla Lathrem and fellow inmate Charles Fuston	20 years, 236 days	Eaglin, a former professional boxer, was serving a life sentence for the 1998 murder of John Frederick Nichols when he committed the murders during a prison escape attempt. Eaglin's two accomplices, Stephen Smith and Michael Jones, were sentenced to death and life in prison respectively for taking part in the attack, but both of them had since died in prison of natural causes.
Jermaine Foster	Shot and killed two men during a carjacking in 1992 in Kissimmee, Florida.	32 years, 120 days	Foster and his three accomplices were charged in both federal and state court for the carjacking, in which they held three men and a woman hostage before Foster shot and killed two of the male victims. In federal court, Foster and two of his accomplices, Gerard Booker and Alf Catholic, were sentenced to life without parole plus 25 years for carjacking charges, marking the United States's first federal prosecution under the Federal Anti-Car Theft Act of 1992. The fourth co-defendant, Leondra Henderson, was sentenced to 33 years in federal prison after pleading guilty and testifying against his co-defendants. In state court, Foster was sentenced to death for first-degree murder while the rest were sentenced to life in prison for similar charges.
Kevin Foster	Shot high school music teacher Mark Schwebes.	28 years, 189 days	Two of Foster's accomplices were sentenced to life without parole. A third was sentenced to 32 years' jail.
Konstantinos Fotopoulos	Killed two men in separate cases in October and November 1989.	36 years, 21 days	In October 1989, Fotopoulos and his girlfriend Deidre Hunt first killed 19-year-old Kevin Ramsey, who was lured into the woods, tied him to a tree before killing him. In November 1989, Fotopoulos and Hunt plotted to kill the former's wife, and hired 18-year-old Bryan Chase to carry out the deed. Chase broke into Fotopoulos's home and shot his wife (who survived), Fotopoulos shot and murdered Chase in order to disguise it as a killing in self-defense. Hunt was originally sentenced to death, but her sentence was commuted to life imprisonment in 1998.
Leonard Gonzalez	Murders of Byrd and Melanie Billings.	15 years, 278 days	
Leonardo Franqui	Murdered 46-year-old Raul Lopez during a 1991 robbery in Hialeah.	32 years, 363 days	Franqui and San Martin were also given a second death sentence on October 11, 1994, for the 1992 murder of North Miami police sergeant Steven Bauer during a bank robbery. However, in 1998, the Florida Supreme Court vacated San Martin's death sentence in Bauer's case and re-sentenced him to life without parole because the trial judge had improperly overridden the jury’s life recommendation. Franqui's two death sentences were ultimately upheld for the murders of both Sergeant Bauer and Lopez. A third man, Pablo Abreu, was also convicted of Lopez's murder and sentenced to life in prison.
Pablo San Martin	Murdered 46-year-old Raul Lopez during a 1991 robbery in Hialeah.	32 years, 363 days	
Ricardo Gonzalez	Murdered North Miami police sergeant Steven Bauer during a 1992 bank robbery.	32 years, 42 days	Gonzalez was one of five men convicted of killing the officer. Three of his co-defendants – Leonardo Franqui, Pablo San Martin, and Fernando Fernandez – were also sentenced to death while the fourth, Pablo Abreu, was sentenced to life imprisonment. However, the death sentences of both San Martin and Fernandez were commuted to life imprisonment, and Fernandez died in prison in 2018. Gonzalez is currently scheduled for execution on December 1, 2026.
Robert Roy Gordon	1994 murder-for-hire of 38-year-old Louis Davidson	31 years, 5 days	Gordon and McDonald were hired to kill Louis Davidson, a Jamaican doctor, in St. Petersburg, Florida, on the orders of Davidson's wife Denise. Davidson was found hogtied, beaten and drowned face down in the bathtub of his apartment. Denise was convicted of first-degree murder and sentenced to life imprisonment for soliciting her husband's murder, while a second woman, Susan Shores, pleaded guilty to accessory charges for helping to drive the two hitmen to Davidson's residence. Denise's boyfriend Leo Cisneros was wanted as a suspect behind the murder and he remains at large as of today.
Meryl Stanley McDonald	1994 murder-for-hire of 38-year-old Louis Davidson	31 years, 5 days	
Enoch Hall	2008 murder of Donna Fitzgerald at the Tomoka Correctional Institution.	16 years, 311 days	At the time of the murder, Hall was serving two life sentences for kidnapping and raping a 66-year-old woman in Pensacola back in 1993.
James Herard	Solicited the fatal shooting of Eric Jean-Pierre.	11 years, 303 days	Herard was also sentenced to life without parole for the murder of Kiem Huynh, as well as multiple other life terms for three Dunkin' Donuts robberies.
Gary Hilton	Kidnapped, robbed, murdered and dismembered Cheryl Dunlap at Apalachicola National Forest.	15 years, 215 days	He was also sentenced to life in prison in Georgia for the murder of Meredith Emerson, and was sentenced in North Carolina to four life sentences for the murders of John and Irene Bryant. Hilton is also suspected in the killing of Judy Smith.
Gerhard Hojan	Fatally shot two employees at a Waffle House retaurant in 2002.	21 years, 112 days	Hojan's co-defendant, Jimmy Mickel, was acquitted of murder and sentenced to life in prison for robbery and kidnapping.
Albert Richard Holland Jr.	Fatally shot police officer Scott Winters during an arrest for sexually assaulting another woman.	35 years, 95 days	Holland was previously held at a psychiatric hospital in Washington, D.C. after being ruled legally insane for a robbery trial, and escaped twice from the institution before he relocated to Florida, where he killed the officer.
Demorris Hunter	2002 murder of 38-year-old Theresa Ann Green in Orlando.	110 days	Hunter, a serial killer, was also convicted of the 2002 murder of Ivora Huntley in Oakland, California and sentenced to 110 years to life in 2005, before he was extradited to Florida in 2015 to face trial for Green's murder. Hunter previously served 13 years out of a 24-year sentence for killing 18-year-old Cesar Guzman in January 1985.
Jerone Hunter	Bludgeoned and stabbed six people to death.	20 years, 62 days	The crime was the bloodiest mass murder in Volusia County history.
Troy Victorino	Bludgeoned and stabbed six people to death.	20 years, 62 days	The crime was the bloodiest mass murder in Volusia County history.
Michael James Jackson	Kidnapped, robbed and buried alive his girlfriend's former neighbors, married couple James "Reggie" and Carol Sumner, both 61-year-old.	19 years, 85 days	Alan Wade, who helped in the murders, was also sentenced to death but later had his death sentence commuted to life imprisonment. His girlfriend, Tiffany Cole was also sentenced to death, but after a retrial, she was re-sentenced to life on August 23, 2023. Bruce Nixon, who also participated in the murders was sentenced to 45 years in prison.
Ray Lamar Johnston	Kidnapped, raped and murdered his neighbor, LeAnne Coryell, in August 1997.	26 years, 254 days	Johnston was also sentenced to death for the February 1997 murder of Janice Nugent but following a re-sentencing hearing in 2021, his death sentence was commuted to life imprisonment.
Ronald Alan Knight	Robbed and murdered 32-year-old Richard Kunkel in July 1993.	28 years, 177 days	Knight was also convicted of the 1995 murder of Brendan Meehan and a judge sentenced him to life imprisonment in that case after overriding the jury's unanimous vote for the death penalty. In both the murders of Kunkel and Meehan, Knight's motive was found to be driven by hatred against gay men.
Tomasz Roman Kosowski	Murdered 41-year-old Steven Cozzi in March 2023.	2 days	Cozzi's body was never found in this case. The prosecution believed that Cozzi, who disappeared from his law firm under suspicious circumstances, was incapacitated and killed by Kosowski, as a result of a bitter legal dispute between Kosowski and his former workplace Laufer, in which Cozzi represented Laufer.
Jonathan Huey Lawrence	1998 murder of Jennifer Robinson in Santa Rosa County, Florida	26 years, 98 days	Lawrence and Rodgers shot and killed Robinson after they had drinks and sex together, and buried her body in a shallow grave. The pair were also involved in the murder of Justin Livingston, Lawrence's cousin, and they were both sentenced to life imprisonment after being charged and convicted in federal court, because Livingston's murder occurred on a U.S. Navy helicopter training and practice landing site, which was classified as federal land.
Jeremiah Martel Rodgers	1998 murder of Jennifer Robinson in Santa Rosa County, Florida	25 years, 364 days	Lawrence and Rodgers shot and killed Robinson after they had drinks and sex together, and buried her body in a shallow grave. The pair were also involved in the murder of Justin Livingston, Lawrence's cousin, and they were both sentenced to life imprisonment after being charged and convicted in federal court, because Livingston's murder occurred on a U.S. Navy helicopter training and practice landing site, which was classified as federal land.
Ian Deco Lightbourne	Robbed, raped and killed 41-year-old Nancy O'Farrell in 1981.	45 years, 205 days	Lightbourne formerly worked at a horse farm owned by O'Farrell's family, who were pioneers of Ocala's thoroughbred horse breeding industry.
Steven Lorenzo	Raped and murdered two homosexual men, Michael Wachholtz and Jason Galehouse, in 2003.	3 years, 271 days	Lorenzo was also involved in the rapes of seven other homosexual men, who survived the encounters. Lorenzo was convicted under federal law for drugging and raping all his victims and sentenced to 200 years in federal prison after his 2005 arrest by the federal authorities, before he was sentenced to death for state murder charges in 2023. Lorenzo's accomplice Scott Paul Schweickert was sentenced to life imprisonment for state murder charges, as well as 40 years in federal prison for the drug-related offences. Lorenzo had since expressed his wish to be executed and forgo his appeals.
Markeith Loyd	Shot and killed Orlando Police Lieutenant Debra Clayton.	4 years, 264 days	Loyd was previously sentenced to life for the murder of his pregnant ex-girlfriend Sade Dixon.
Patrick McDowell	Killed Nassau County Sheriff's Deputy Joshua Moyers in September 2021.	2 years, 128 days	McDowell killed the officer in order to avoid arrest for outstanding charges of felony misdemeanors from Georgia.
Everett Glenn Miller	Killed two police officers, Sergeant Sam Howard and Officer Matthew Baxter, in Kissimmee, Florida, in 2017.	4 years, 193 days	Miller shot and killed the officers during their routine check for suspected drug activities. Evidence showed that Miller showed hostility and hatred towards law enforcement and reflect his extremist beliefs in Facebook posts leading up to the murders.
Dontae Morris	Killed five people, including two police officers, in Tampa between May and June 2010.	12 years, 176 days	
Alvin Leroy Morton	1992 murders of John Bowers and Madeline Weisser in Hudson, Florida.	32 years, 249 days	Morton's three accomplices, all juveniles, were sentenced to varying terms: Timothy Kane and Bobby Garner were sentenced to life imprisonment for first-degree murder, while Christopher Marvin Walker received 15 years for accessory to murder and conspiracy to commit armed robbery. Walker and Kane were paroled in 2001 and 2017, respectively, while Garner remains incarcerated as of 2026.
Joe Elton Nixon	Kidnapped and murdered 38-year-old Jeanne Bickner in 1984. He tied her with jumper cables to a pine tree and burned her alive.	41 years, 115 days	
Lenard James Philmore	1997 carjacking and murder of Kazue Perron, a Japanese citizen, in Martin County, Florida	26 years, 124 days	Philmore and Spann kidnapped Perron in West Palm Beach, Florida, and killed her in Martin County. The duo used her car as their getaway vehicle in a pre-planned bank robbery that took place later the same day. Spann was wanted for the unrelated 1997 murder of Reginald Lott in Tallahassee at the time of Perron's abduction-killing, and he was sentenced to 13 years for manslaughter in Lott's death.
Anthony Antonio Spann	1997 carjacking and murder of Kazue Perron, a Japanese citizen, in Martin County, Florida	26 years, 152 days	Philmore and Spann kidnapped Perron in West Palm Beach, Florida, and killed her in Martin County. The duo used her car as their getaway vehicle in a pre-planned bank robbery that took place later the same day. Spann was wanted for the unrelated 1997 murder of Reginald Lott in Tallahassee at the time of Perron's abduction-killing, and he was sentenced to 13 years for manslaughter in Lott's death.
Norberto Pietri	Convicted of the 1988 murder of Brian Chappell, a 31-year-old West Palm Beach police officer.	36 years, 252 days	Pietri had escaped from prison four days before the murder, and was involved in multiple burglaries before he killed the officer.
Carl Puiatti	Convicted of the 1983 kidnapping and murder of Sharilyn Ritchie.	42 years, 202 days	Puiatti and his co-defendant Robert Dewey Glock abducted Ritchie from a Bradenton shopping mall, and robbed her of $150 and her wedding ring before they shot and killed her at an orange grove in Dade City. Glock was sentenced to death and executed on January 11, 2001, by lethal injection.
Granville Ritchie	Convicted of the rape and murder of Felecia Williams in May 2014.	6 years, 72 days	
Michael Thomas Rivera	Convicted of the 1986 murder of Staci Jazvac.	39 years, 205 days	Rivera was also convicted of the kidnapping and attempted murder of another 11-year-old girl in July 1985.
James Franklin Rose	1976 kidnapping and murder of eight-year-old Lisa Berry in Fort Lauderdale, Florida.	49 years, 193 days	Rose kidnapped Berry, the daughter of his ex-girlfriend, and killed her by beating her with a hammer. Rose was also convicted and sentenced to life without parole for the 1975 rape and murder of Jean Savage, whose death was left unsolved for more than 40 years until DNA tests identified Rose as the killer. Rose is South Florida's longest-serving death row convict.
Mark Sievers	Orchestrated the murder of his wife, 46-year-old Teresa Sievers.	6 years, 323 days	
Delmer Smith	2009 murder of 48-year-old Kathleen Briles in Manatee County.	13 years, 178 days	Smith was also convicted of the rape and murder of Georgann Smith and sentenced to life in prison. He was subsequently linked to multiple home invasion cases, one of which resulted in another conviction and an additional life sentence.
Donald James Smith	Kidnapped, raped, and murdered 8-year-old Cherish Perrywinkle.	8 years, 204 days	In April 2021, the Supreme Court of Florida upheld Smith's conviction and death sentence.
David Kelsey Sparre	2010 murder of Tiara Pool in Jacksonville, Florida.	14 years, 237 days	Sparre was dubbed the "Craigslist killer", as he met Pool through an ad in Craigslist, and murdered her after having sex with her in her apartment.
William Lee Thompson	Tortured and murdered 23-year-old Sally Ivester in a motel room in 1976.	50 years, 150 days (first sentence; overturned); 48 years, 63 days (second sentence)	Thompson's co-defendant, Rocco James Surace, was originally also sentenced to death for first-degree murder, but he was granted a re-trial and convicted of second-degree murder and sentenced to life imprisonment. Surace died in prison in 1993.
Quentin Marcus Truehill	Kidnapped and murdered a 29-year-old Florida State University student Vincent Binder.	12 years, 190 days	Truehill, who was previously jailed 30 years in Louisiana for manslaughter, committed the murder after he escaped from jail with his two accomplices. Truehill's two accomplices, Peter Marcus Hughes and Kentrell Feronti Johnson, were both sentenced to life imprisonment for the murder. Johnson was originally condemned to death row before the sentence was commuted to life upon his appeal.
Wade Wilson	Strangled two women to death then ran over the second victim multiple times.	2 years, 86 days	Called the Deadpool killer due to sharing the same name as the fictional character. His trial also occurred around the same time as the release of Deadpool & Wolverine.
Michael Woodbury	2017 murder of his cellmate Antoneeze Haynes in Okeechobee Correctional Institution.	8 years, 59 days	Haynes was convicted in 2007 of killing three men at a New Hampshire store and was sentenced to three consecutive life sentences without parole. Haynes was later transferred from New Hampshire to Florida to serve his sentence under an interstate compact order, and he killed Haynes while serving his sentence.
Zephen Xaver	Perpetrated the 2019 Sebring shooting.	1 year, 341 days	
Tommy Zeigler	Quadruple murder of Eunice Zeigler, Perry and Virginia Edwards, and Charlie Mays.	50 years, 129 days	Zeigler's case has been the focus of controversy since he was denied bloodstain DNA analysis in 2013 and 2016, and touch DNA analysis in April 2017. Zeigler was scheduled to be executed on October 22, 1982. However, the U.S. District Court stayed the execution due to new evidence. Zeigler was then scheduled to be executed on May 20, 1986, but it was again stayed by the 11th Circuit Court of Appeals due to inadequate representation. Zeigler is Florida's longest-serving death row inmate.
Joseph Adam Zieler	1990 rape and double murder of Robin Cornell and Lisa Story.	3 years, 149 days	The double murder remained unsolved for 26 years until DNA testing linked Zieler to the case while he was in custody facing an unrelated assault charge. Zieler was sentenced to death in 2023 by a vote of 10–2.

=== Georgia ===
- On death row: 33 (as of June 30, 2026)
- Total number executed: 1,027 (1735–2024)

Due to the number of Georgia death row inmates, only prisoners with Wikipedia pages are listed.

Name	Description of crime	Time on death row	Other
David Edenfield	Raped and murdered 6-year-old Christopher Barrios Jr.	17 years, 47 days	Edenfield is the oldest death row inmate in Georgia.
Jerry Scott Heidler	Murdered four members of the Daniels family in 1997.	27 years, 79 days	Heidler, who received four death sentences for the killings, had also kidnapped three other children from the same household where he committed the murders.
Stacey Humphreys	Robbed and murdered two real estate agents, Lori Brown and Cyndi Williams, in 2003.	19 years, 53 days	Humphreys was out on parole for a 1993 felony theft conviction at the time of the killings.
Tiffany Moss	Murdered her stepdaughter, 10-year-old Emani Moss.	7 years, 206 days	Moss is the only female death row inmate in Georgia.
Michael Nance	Robbed a bank and committed murder during a carjacking.	29 years, 57 days	
Dorian Frank O'Kelley	Murdered 41-year-old Susan Pittman and her 13-year-old daughter Kimberly Pittman during a robbery in 2002.	21 years, 14 days	The men assaulted and tortured both the victims before Susan was stabbed to death while Kimberly died in a fire started by both men to burn the house and destroy evidence of their crime.
Darryl Scott Stinski	Murdered 41-year-old Susan Pittman and her 13-year-old daughter Kimberly Pittman during a robbery in 2002.	19 years, 162 days	The men assaulted and tortured both the victims before Susan was stabbed to death while Kimberly died in a fire started by both men to burn the house and destroy evidence of their crime.
Lyndon Fitzgerald Pace	Robbed and killed at least four elderly women between 1988 and 1989.	30 years, 260 days	
Virgil Delano Presnell Jr.	Abducted, raped, and killed eight-year-old Lori Ann Smith in 1976.	50 years, 88 days	Presnell is the state's longest-serving death row inmate.
Reinaldo Rivera	Abducted, raped, and killed four women between 1999 and 2000.	22 years, 275 days	

=== Idaho ===
- On death row: 8
- Total number executed: 29 (1800–2012)

Name	Description of crime	Time on death row	Other
Azad Haji Abdullah	Murder by arson of his wife and attempted murder of their four children in Boise on October 5, 2002.	21 years, 364 days	
Thomas Eugene Creech	Murder by beating of a fellow inmate on May 13, 1981.	50 years, 242 days (first sentence) 44 years, 301 days (second sentence)	Previously on Idaho's death row; in 1977 the U.S. Supreme Court overturned Idaho's previous death penalty on his appeal.
Chad Guy Daybell	Co-perpetrator of the murders of his wife and his lover's children in 2019.	2 years, 174 days	His co-defendant Lori Vallow Daybell was sentenced to life imprisonment without the possibility of parole.
Timothy Alan Dunlap	Fatally shot a Soda Springs bank teller during a robbery on October 16, 1991.	34 years, 216 days	Also sentenced in Ohio for murdering his girlfriend.
James Harvey Hairston	Robbed and shot an elderly Downey couple on January 6, 1996.	30 years, 7 days	Denied retrial in 2010.
Gerald Ross Pizzuto Jr.	Killed a Marsing woman and her nephew in July 1985.	40 years, 183 days	Denied retrial in 2010.
Jonathan Daniel Renfro	Shot dead Coeur d'Alene Police Sgt. Greg Moore on May 5, 2015.	9 years, 40 days	
Robin Lee Row	Murder by arson of her husband and their two children in February 1992.	32 years, 341 days	Only woman on Idaho's death row; housed at the Pocatello Women's Correctional Center.

=== Indiana ===
- On death row: 4 (November 5, 2026)
- Total number executed: 154 (1800–2026)

Name	Description of crime	Time on death row	Other
William Clyde Gibson	Rape and bludgeoning of 75-year-old Christine Whitis.	13 years, 11 days	Whitis was a family friend who had come to his New Albany home to console Gibson after his mother's death. Gibson has pleaded guilty to three murders. After he was arrested for Whitis' murder, police excavated Gibson's yard to recover the body of Stephanie Kirk, a 35-year-old Charlestown woman who disappeared in 2012. He also admitted to fatally stabbing Karen Hodella of Port Orange, Florida, in October 2002.
Eric Darnell Holmes	Stabbed to death 20-year-old Theresa Blosl and 30-year-old Charles Ervin.	33 years, 241 days	Holmes was fired from his job at Shoney's Restaurant after an argument with co-worker Amy Foshee. At closing on the day of his firing, Holmes waited in the parking lot with Michael Vance. Holmes and Vance attacked Foshee and two managers as they exited the building, stabbing them multiple times, and stealing the bank deposit money. The restaurant managers, Theresa Blosl and Charles Ervin, died; Foshee survived. Vance was tried separately and sentenced to 190 years.
Kevin Charles Isom	Shot his wife, 40-year-old Cassandra Isom and his two stepchildren, 16-year-old Michael Moore and 13-year-old Ci'Andria Cole.	13 years, 259 days	The crime was in response to learning his wife was planning to leave him. He then barricaded himself in the family's apartment and shot at police officers attempting to take him into custody. Isom's defense attorney argued that a death sentence was inappropriate given the emotional state of his client, who suffered an extreme emotional disturbance from losing his job and then being left by his wife. However, the prosecution pointed out that he was extremely abusive and unfaithful to his wife and drove her away.
Michael Dean Overstreet	Raped, strangled and shot 18-year-old Kelly Eckart.	26 years, 114 days	Kelly Eckart, an 18-year-old freshman at Franklin College, was last seen on September 27, 1997, after leaving work. The next morning, her car was found abandoned in a rural area, with its lights on and keys in the ignition. She was found in a ravine in Brown County four days later. She had been shot and strangled. Semen found on the body was matched to Overstreet. He has schizoaffective disorder and had hallucinations as a child. He was discharged from the marines on the basis of mental illness. A judge determined Overstreet was not competent to be executed in November 2014. The Indiana Attorney General chose not to appeal the decision. He remains on death row indefinitely.

=== Kansas ===
- On death row: 9
- Total number executed: 57 (1800–1965)

Name	Description of crime	Time on death row	Other
Jonathan Carr	Five random brutal crimes committed from December 7 to 14, 2000.	24 years, 7 days (first sentence; overturned); 12 years, 306 days (second sentence)	After the Kansas Supreme Court overturned their death sentences, the United States Supreme Court reinstated them on January 20, 2014.
Reginald Carr	Five random brutal crimes committed from December 7 to 14, 2000.	24 years, 7 days (first sentence; overturned); 12 years, 306 days (second sentence)	After the Kansas Supreme Court overturned their death sentences, the United States Supreme Court reinstated them on January 20, 2014.
Scott Cheever	Murder of Sheriff Matt Samuels in January 2005.	18 years, 303 days	
Kyle Trevor Flack	Shot two men, and a mother and daughter on May 1, 2013.	10 years, 188 days	
Sidney Gleason	Murder of Miki Martinez and Darren Wornkey in February 2004.	20 years, 86 days (first sentence; overturned); 12 years, 306 days (second sentence)	After the Kansas Supreme Court overturned his death sentence, the United States Supreme Court reinstated it on January 20, 2014.
James Kraig Kahler	Murders of his wife Karen, his two daughters, Lauren and Emily, and his wife's grandmother, Dorothy Wight.	15 years, 42 days	
Gary Kleypas	1996 rape and murder of Carrie Williams in Pittsburg, Kansas.	28 years, 256 days (first sentence; overturned); 17 years, 354 days (second sentence)	The Kansas Supreme Court, in its review of his case, found serious errors with the state's death penalty statute and ordered that the penalty phase of his trial be redone. The sentence was overturned in 2001. In 2008, he was sentenced to death again.
John E. Robinson Sr.	Capital murder convictions for the murders of Izabel Lewicka and Suzette Trouten and first degree murder in the case of Lisa Stasi, who disappeared in 1985.	23 years, 305 days	In 2005, he admitted responsibility for five additional homicides across the river, at trial in Kansas City, Missouri, in a deal to receive multiple life sentences without possibility of parole and avoid more death sentences. In 2015 the Kansas Supreme Court overturned Robinson's convictions for the murders of Suzette Trouten and Lisa Stasi on technicalities but his death sentence for the murder of Izabel Lewicka was upheld.
Justin Thurber	Kidnapped, raped, tortured and murdered 19-year-old college student Jodi Sanderholm in 2007.	17 years, 247 days	In October 2017, he appealed death sentence with arguments whether he is developmentally disabled. The judge rejected the defense's request for a hearing on whether Thurber is developmentally disabled, ruling that the defense had not presented enough evidence to warrant a hearing.

=== Kentucky ===
- On death row: 23
- Total number executed: 427 (1700–2008)

Due to the number of Kentucky death row inmates, only prisoners with Wikipedia pages are listed.

Name	Description of crime	Time on death row	Other
Ralph Baze	Shot two police officers at his home.	32 years, 291 days	He sued the Kentucky State Department of Corrections on the grounds that execution by lethal injection using the cocktail prescribed by Kentucky law constitutes cruel and unusual punishment in violation of the Eighth Amendment. The U.S. Supreme Court heard the case but rejected his challenge by a vote of 7–2. See Baze v. Rees
Virginia Susan Caudill	Murdered 73-year-old Lonetta White during a robbery in 1998 and later burned her body.	26 years, 243 days	Caudill is the only woman on Kentucky's death row. Caudill, along with co-defendant Jonathan Goforth (1960-2025), were the first two white people sentenced to death in modern-era Kentucky for murdering an African-American person.
Robert Carl Foley	1989 quadruple murder of Kimberly Bowersock, Lillian Contino, Jerry McMillen, and Calvin Reynolds, and 1991 murder of the Vaughn brothers in Laurel County, Kentucky.	33 years, 61 days	Foley was previously convicted and jailed for the 1976 murder of Zetler Fields Jr. before his 1981 release on parole. Foley received a total of six death sentences for the 1989 and 1991 cases.
Victor Dewayne Taylor	Kidnapped, robbed and shot two 17-year-old Trinity High School students.	40 years, 183 days	Taylor's cousin, George Wade, was sentenced to life imprisonment.
Larry Lamont White	Robbery and shooting of 22-year-old Pamela Armstrong in Louisville on June 4, 1983.	41 years, 252 days (first sentence; overturned); 12 years, 39 days (second sentence)	White was initially convicted and sentenced to death for two other murders committed between June and July 1983, but his sentence was overturned and he was resentenced to 29 years' imprisonment. He was paroled in 2001 and rearrested for violating his parole in 2006, when he was linked via DNA to Armstrong's killing.

=== Louisiana ===
- On death row: 54 (as of July 3, 2026)
- Total number executed: 660 (1700–2025)

Due to the number of Louisiana death row inmates, only prisoners with Wikipedia pages are listed.

Name	Description of crime	Time on death row	Other
Anthony Bell	Convicted of murdering his wife and four in-laws during a church shooting in 2006.	18 years, 71 days	Bell was sentenced to five consecutive death sentences for the first-degree murders of all five victims. He also received a 50-year prison term for the attempted murder of his mother-in-law, who was the sole survivor of the shooting.
Daniel Blank	Convicted of the 1997 murder of 71-year-old Lillian Philippe.	26 years, 348 days	Dubbed the "River Parishes serial killer", Blank had murdered a total of six people, including Philippe. Blank was sentenced to death only for Philippe's murder, in addition to four sentences of life without parole for another four of the killings, but never stood trial for the sixth murder.
Henri Broadway	Involved in the murder of 36-year-old police officer Betty Smothers.	30 years, 290 days	The murdered police officer was the mother of Warrick Dunn, a former NFL running back. Broadway's accomplice, Kevan Brumfield, was also sentenced to death, but was resentenced to life on July 20, 2014, as he was ruled too intellectually disabled and therefore ineligible for execution.
David Brown	Murdered 49-year-old Corrections Captain David Knapps at the Louisiana State Penitentiary in 1999.	15 years, 23 days	Brown and Clark were both members of the "Angola 5", a group of five inmates involved in an escape attempt that led to the murder of Knapps. Brown was serving a life sentence for a 1992 second-degree murder case while Clark was originally sentenced to death for a 1984 murder case before the sentence was commuted to life imprisonment. The remaining three Angola 5 members – David Mathis, Barry Edge and Robert Carley – were all sentenced to life without parole for their participation in the murder.
Jeffrey Cameron Clark	Murdered 49-year-old Corrections Captain David Knapps at the Louisiana State Penitentiary in 1999.	15 years, 182 days	Brown and Clark were both members of the "Angola 5", a group of five inmates involved in an escape attempt that led to the murder of Knapps. Brown was serving a life sentence for a 1992 second-degree murder case while Clark was originally sentenced to death for a 1984 murder case before the sentence was commuted to life imprisonment. The remaining three Angola 5 members – David Mathis, Barry Edge and Robert Carley – were all sentenced to life without parole for their participation in the murder.
Nathaniel Code	Mass murder of four people.	35 years, 301 days	Code had also been responsible for at least four other murders, and investigators believe his murder count could be as high as twelve.
Antoinette Frank	Murdered 25-year-old police officer Ronald Williams and 17-year-old Cuong Vu and 24-year-old Ha Vu, a brother and a sister owners of a restaurant where she worked as a security guard.	31 years, 33 days	Frank was a New Orleans police officer. Her accomplice, Roger Lacaze was also sentenced to death, but was resentenced to life.
Kyle David Joekel	Shot and murdered two police officers, 34-year-old Brandon Nielsen and 27-year-old Jeremy Triche, in a mass shooting in 2012.	3 years, 285 days	Joekel was one of the two shooters involved in the shooting, which also left another two policemen injured. The other shooter, Brian Lyn Smith, was ruled mentally incompetent to stand trial and detained in a mental facility. Three members of Smith's family and his girlfriend were arrested for lesser charges of being an accessory to attempted first-degree murder.
Jesse Montejo	Shot and killed a business owner inside a home.	21 years, 193 days	
Larry Roy	Slashed five people in 1993 at Cheneyville, Louisiana, which led to the deaths of 33-year-old Freddie Richard Jr. and 75-year-old Rosetta Silas.	32 years, 84 days	Dubbed the "Cheneyville Slasher" by the media, Roy attacked Richard's ex-wife, who was his former girlfriend, after she broke off their relationship, resulting in the slashing-deaths.
Todd Wessinger	Shot and killed two restaurant employees, 27-year-old Stephanie Guzzardo and 46-year-old David Breakwell, during a robbery-turned mass shooting in 1995.	29 years, 66 days	Wessinger used to work as a dishwasher at the restaurant where he robbed and later shot four of his former co-workers, which led to the deaths of Breakwell and Guzzardo.

=== Mississippi ===
- On death row: 35
- Total number executed: 376 (1800–2025)

Due to the number of Mississippi death row inmates, only prisoners with Wikipedia pages are listed.

Name	Description of crime	Time on death row	Other
Martez Terrell Abram	Fatally shot two colleagues at a Walmart store and wounded a police officer during a gunfight near the store.	3 years, 355 days	Abram was given two death sentences for two counts of first-degree murder and life imprisonment for one count of attempted murder.
Anthony Carr	Tortured and murdered four members of the Parker family.	36 years, 64 days	Carr was sentenced to death for all four of the murders, while Simon was sentenced to death for three, receiving a life sentence for the fourth.
Robert Simon Jr.	Tortured and murdered four members of the Parker family.	36 years, 40 days	Carr was sentenced to death for all four of the murders, while Simon was sentenced to death for three, receiving a life sentence for the fourth.
Lisa Jo Chamberlin	Murdered 34-year-old Vernon Hulett and 38-year-old Linda Heinztelman in 2004	20 years, 110 days	Chamberlin, who received two death sentences for both counts of capital murder, is the only woman on Mississippi's death row. Chamberlin's boyfriend, Roger Lee Gillett, was originally sentenced to death in 2007 for the murders, but his death sentences were commuted to life without parole in 2018.
Willie Cory Godbolt	Fatally shot eight people in a killing spree in Lincoln County, Mississippi, including police officer William Durr.	6 years, 268 days	Godbolt was given four death sentences and six life sentences plus 40 years.
Alberto Garcia	Abducted, raped and murdered five-year-old Janaya Thompson in 2014.	9 years, 301 days	Garcia pleaded guilty to the crime in January 2017, before he was sentenced to death that same month.
Willie Jerome Manning	Murdered 19-year-old Jon Steckler and 22-year-old Tiffany Miller.	32 years, 14 days	Manning was sentenced to death for two separate double murders. One of these convictions was overturned but he remains on death row for the other one.

=== Missouri ===
- On death row: 8
- Total number executed: 379 (1800–2025)

Name	Description of crime	Time on death row	Other
Terrance Anderson	Murdered Stephen and Debbie Rainwater, his ex-girlfriend's parents.	25 years, 190 days	
Richard Emery	Murdered his girlfriend and her family in their home.	4 years, 19 days	
Charles Lee Mathenia	Murdered elderly sisters, 72-year-old Daisy Nash and 70-year-old Louanna Bailey in 1984.	41 years, 318 days	In 1994, he was declared mentally disabled.
Vincent McFadden	Fatally shot his girlfriend's sister, 18-year-old Leslie Addison.	21 years, 211 days	McFadden also committed another fatal shooting in 2002.
Roosevelt Pollard	Murdered Richard Alford, an Arkansas businessman.	40 years, 299 days	Some time after being sentenced to death, Pollard was diagnosed with paranoid schizophrenia. In 1999, he was ruled incompetent to be executed.
Joshua Rocha	Murdered North Kansas City Police Officer Daniel Vasquez.	363 days	
Kenneth Lee Simpson	Shot and killed Hermann Police Officer Mason Griffith at a convenience store.	157 days	Simpson was also sentenced to life in prison for shooting and wounding Officer Adam Sullentrup.
Craig Michael Wood	Kidnapped, raped, and fatally shot 10-year-old Hailey Owens.	8 years, 315 days	

=== Montana ===
- On death row: 2
- Total number executed: 74 (1800–2006)

Name	Description of crime	Time on death row	Other
William Jay Gollehon	Murder by bludgeoning of Gerald Pileggi, an inmate during a riot in 1991.	34 years, 251 days	At that moment, Gollehon was serving a 130-year sentence for murdering a woman.
Ronald Allen Smith	Kidnapped and murdered 23-year-old Harvey Mad Man and 20-year-old Thomas Running Rabbit, two Native American men in the fall of 1982.	43 years, 245 days	Smith is the only Canadian on death row in the United States.

=== Nebraska ===
- On death row: 12
- Total number executed: 38 (1866–2018)

Name	Description of crime	Time on death row	Other
Roy Ellis	Abducted, sexually assaulted, and beat 12-year-old Amber Harris to death with a hammer, later he threw her body into a ravine.	17 years, 289 days	Ellis was a registered sex offender at the time of the murder
Jorge Galindo	Shooting of five people in a failed bank robbery.	22 years, 12 days	Gabriel Rodriguez, who participated in the failed robbery was sentenced to five terms of life imprisonment.
Jose Sandoval	Shooting of five people in a failed bank robbery.	21 years, 295 days	Gabriel Rodriguez, who participated in the failed robbery was sentenced to five terms of life imprisonment.
Erick Fernando Vela	Shooting of five people in a failed bank robbery.	19 years, 314 days	Gabriel Rodriguez, who participated in the failed robbery was sentenced to five terms of life imprisonment.
Anthony Garcia	Committed two separate double murders in March 2008 and May 2013.	8 years, 69 days	
Jeffrey Hessler	Kidnapped, raped and murdered 15-year-old Heather Guerrero.	21 years, 188 days	
Nikko Allen Jenkins	Killed four people in 2013 over the course of 10 days in a killing spree.	9 years, 176 days	
Jason Jones	Shot and murdered four people in two different homes before setting them on fire in Laurel, Nebraska	226 days	Jones was one of two people convicted of the fatal shootings. His wife, Carrie Jones, was sentenced to life in prison in 2025.
John Lotter	Murdered 19-year-old Phillip DeVine, 24-year-old Lisa Lambert and 21-year-old Brandon Teena.	30 years, 274 days	Days prior, Teena had reported to police that Lotter and his accomplice Tom Nissen had beat and raped him upon discovering he was transgender. Nissen was sentenced to life.
Raymond Mata Jr.	Kidnapped, murdered and dismembered 3-year-old Adam Gomez, his ex-girlfriend's son.	26 years, 174 days	
Marco Torres	Execution style shooting of two men, with one of the victims being strangled and bound.	16 years, 297 days	
Aubrey Clifton Trail	Killed and dismembered 24-year-old Sydney Loofe.	5 years, 166 days	His accomplice, Bailey Boswell, was sentenced to life in prison.

=== Nevada ===
- On death row: 57
- Total number executed: 76 (1800–2006)

Due to the number of Nevada death row inmates, only prisoners with Wikipedia pages are listed.

Name	Description of crime	Time on death row	Other
James Biela	Kidnapped, raped and murdered 19-year-old Brianna Denison.	16 years, 179 days	
Zane Michael Floyd	Shot four employees during a mass shooting in a supermarket.	26 years, 133 days	
Ammar Harris	Perpetrator of the 2013 Las Vegas Strip shooting and crash.	10 years, 322 days	Harris first shot aspiring rapper Kenneth Cherry Jr., whose Maserati lost control and crashed into a taxi, killing the driver Michael Boldon and his passenger Sandra Sutton-Wasmund. Harris was convicted of first-degree murder for the triple deaths and received three death sentences as a result.
David Stephen Middleton	Kidnapped, raped, tortured and murdered 42-year-old Thelma Davila and 45-year-old Katherine Powell in 1994 and 1995, respectively.	29 years, 65 days	Middleton was an ex-police officer with the Miami-Dade Police Department, Middleton is a suspect in a third murder committed in Colorado in 1993 and rapes done during his tenure with the Miami-Dade PD.
Tracy Petrocelli	Convicted of the robbery-murder of used car dealer James Wilson in March 1982.	44 years, 75 days (first sentence; overturned); 7 years, 190 days (second sentence; overturned)	Petrocelli was also convicted of killing two people: his 18-year-old girlfriend Melanie Barker in Washington and 30-year-old Dennis Gibson in California, and sentenced to life imprisonment for both cases. Petrocelli's death sentence was first overturned in 2017, before it was reinstated in 2019, but the sentence was again overturned in 2021, and Petrocelli is currently awaiting re-sentencing as of 2026. Petrocelli remains listed on the state's death row list despite the reversal of his death sentence as of October 2021.
Javier Righetti	Tortured, raped and murdered 15-year-old Alyssa Otremba.	9 years, 197 days	At the time of sentencing, Righetti was the youngest person in Nevada's 170-year history to be given the death penalty. Righetti also received 116 years to life for rape and kidnapping.

=== New Hampshire ===
- On death row: 1 (2014)
- Total number executed: 24 (1700–1939)

Note: On May 30, 2019, the state Senate voted to override Governor Chris Sununu's veto on a bill that abolished the state's death penalty 16–8. Since the veto had already been overridden by the state House of Representatives, the bill immediately became law and abolished capital punishment, replacing it with life in prison without the possibility of parole. The law was not retroactive and the one person on death row at the time of abolition remains there.

Name	Description of crime	Time on death row	Other
Michael Kiser Addison	Murder of Michael Briggs, an on-duty police officer, on October 16, 2006.	17 years, 339 days	Only death row inmate in New Hampshire due to the subsequent abolition of state capital punishment.

=== North Carolina ===
- On death row: 123
- Total number executed: 827 (1700–2006)

Due to the number of North Carolina death row inmates, only prisoners with Wikipedia pages are listed.

Name	Description of crime	Time on death row	Other
Antwan Andre Anthony	Convicted of the murders of three men in a 2012 convenience store shooting.	10 years, 230 days	Anthony's three co-defendants were also convicted of first-degree murder and second-degree murder in the same case, and sentenced to fixed prison terms and life for the charges.
Mikel Edward Brady II	Murdered four prison employees during a foiled prison escape attempt in 2017.	7 years, 25 days	The fourth accomplice, Seth Jameson Frazier, was sentenced to four consecutive life sentences without parole for his role in the murders. Brady was the leader of the four in the prison attack. Prior to the murders, Brady and Monk were incarcerated for attempted murder in unrelated cases, while Buckman was convicted and detained for second-degree murder in another case.
Wisezah Datawn Buckman	Murdered four prison employees during a foiled prison escape attempt in 2017.	3 years, 19 days	The fourth accomplice, Seth Jameson Frazier, was sentenced to four consecutive life sentences without parole for his role in the murders. Brady was the leader of the four in the prison attack. Prior to the murders, Brady and Monk were incarcerated for attempted murder in unrelated cases, while Buckman was convicted and detained for second-degree murder in another case.
Jonathan Michael Monk	Murdered four prison employees during a foiled prison escape attempt in 2017.	1 year, 240 days	The fourth accomplice, Seth Jameson Frazier, was sentenced to four consecutive life sentences without parole for his role in the murders. Brady was the leader of the four in the prison attack. Prior to the murders, Brady and Monk were incarcerated for attempted murder in unrelated cases, while Buckman was convicted and detained for second-degree murder in another case.
Linwood Forte	Murders of three elderly Goldsboro residents in their homes committed between May and October 1990.	23 years, 45 days	Also serving four consecutive life sentences for rapes related to the crimes. Additionally suspected of a murder in 1994, but never charged.
Terry Hyatt	Kidnappings, rapes and murders of Harriet Simmons and Betty McConnell, committed four months apart in 1979.	26 years, 288 days	Also serving six life sentences for the same murders, and a seventh for a third murder committed in 1987.
Mario Andrette McNeill	2009 kidnapping, sexual assault and murder of Shaniya Davis, a five-year-old girl.	13 years, 177 days	Davis's mother Antoinette sold her daughter to McNeill to pay off a drug debt, and McNeill subsequently raped and murdered the girl. Antoinette was sentenced to 17 1/2 to 21 years in prison for charges that include second-degree murder and human trafficking.
Blanche Taylor Moore	Poisoned her boyfriend, Raymond Reid, with arsenic.	35 years, 308 days	Moore has also been linked to the deaths of her father, mother in law, and first husband.
Michael McGay Reeves	Murdered 27-year-old Susan Toler during a home invasion in 1989.	34 years, 192 days	Reeves, a convicted rapist, is suspected in two similar murders in Virginia and multiple sexual assaults across North Carolina, Virginia and Tennessee.
Henry Louis Wallace	Raped and killed nine women between 1990 and 1994.	29 years, 297 days	Known as "The Taco Bell Strangler". Wallace confessed to the murders of 11 women.
Lesley Eugene Warren	Raped and murdered his girlfriend Jayme Hurley and student Katherine Johnson on separate occasions in 1990.	31 years, 47 days	Known as "The Babyface Killer". Warren was also sentenced to life imprisonment for murdering a woman in South Carolina, and was never charged for a murder in New York. He confessed to four murders additional murders committed in the Carolinas, but these victims have never been identified.
John Williams Jr.	Raped and killed two women in 1996.	28 years, 263 days	Williams was the believed prime suspect in multiple murders across the Raleigh area.

=== Ohio ===
- On death row: 106 (as of September 8, 2026)
- Total number executed: 494 (1700–2018)

Due to the number of Ohio death row inmates, only prisoners with Wikipedia pages are listed.

Name	Description of crime	Time on death row	Other
Stanley Theodore Adams	Killed 12-year-old Ashley Cook and her 43-year-old mother Esther Cook in 1999.	25 years, 41 days	Adams was additionally sentenced to 25 years to life in prison for the 1999 rape and murder of 40-year-old Roslyn Taylor. He was also a suspect in at least two other killings. Scheduled to be executed on February 16, 2028.
Richard Beasley	Lured three men using a Craigslist ad for a non-existent job and shot them in 2011.	13 years, 247 days	His accomplice, Brogan Rafferty, was sentenced to life in prison.
George Brinkman	Killed a female friend, her two daughters, and an elderly couple who he was friends with in June 2017.	7 years, 329 days	First sentenced when he admitted to committing the Royalton murders, then sentenced again for the Lake Township murders.
Quisi Bryan	Killed a Cleveland police officer during a traffic stop in 2000.	25 years, 268 days	Scheduled to be executed on November 15, 2028.
Curtis Clinton	Killed a mother and her two children in 2012.	13 years, 8 days	Clinton was previously sentenced to 13 years in prison for the 1997 manslaughter of 18-year-old Misty Keckler. He was also a suspect in the 1994 unsolved murder of Ida Franklin.
Jeronique Cunningham	Murdered two girls during a drug-related robbery and mass shooting in 2002.	24 years, 149 days	The men, who were half-brothers, had also shot another six victims during the same robbery and shooting. Jackson is scheduled to be executed on June 13, 2029.
Cleveland Jackson	Murdered two girls during a drug-related robbery and mass shooting in 2002.	24 years, 109 days	The men, who were half-brothers, had also shot another six victims during the same robbery and shooting. Jackson is scheduled to be executed on June 13, 2029.
Archie Dixon	Killed 22-year-old Christopher Hammer by burying him alive in a shallow grave in 1993.	31 years, 0 days	The men committed the murder in order to steal Hammer's car and sold it off for $2,800. They also stole Hammer's social security card and birth certificate to create a fake identity card in order to sell off the car under Hammer's name. Dixon's girlfriend was convicted of kidnapping and sentenced to six to 25 years in prison, and had been released on shock probation since 1998. Dixon and Hoffner are currently scheduled to be executed on June 16, and July 14, 2027, respectively.
Timothy Hoffner	Killed 22-year-old Christopher Hammer by burying him alive in a shallow grave in 1993.	31 years, 174 days	The men committed the murder in order to steal Hammer's car and sold it off for $2,800. They also stole Hammer's social security card and birth certificate to create a fake identity card in order to sell off the car under Hammer's name. Dixon's girlfriend was convicted of kidnapping and sentenced to six to 25 years in prison, and had been released on shock probation since 1998. Dixon and Hoffner are currently scheduled to be executed on June 16, and July 14, 2027, respectively.
Shawn Grate	Murdered five women from 2006 to 2016.	8 years, 174 days	An initial execution date was set upon conviction for September 13, 2018, but the execution was stayed due to a pending appeal to the Ohio Supreme Court.
Danny Lee Hill	Raped and murdered 12-year-old Raymond Fife in 1985.	40 years, 262 days	Hill was one of two men convicted of the murder of Raymond Fife. Only Hill, who was 18 at the time of the crime, was sentenced to death. His accomplice, Timothy Combs, was sentenced to life imprisonment because he was 17 when the murder occurred and was therefore ineligible for the death penalty. Combs died in prison in 2018. Hill is scheduled to be executed on July 18, 2029. He was previously scheduled for execution on July 22, 2026, but the date was postponed.
Anthony Kirkland	Raped, strangled and burned the bodies of four females between 2006 and 2009.	16 years, 235 days	Kirkland previously served 16 years for the beating, choking and burning murder of his girlfriend. He was handed two death sentences, plus two sentences of 70 years to life.
Michael Madison	Kidnapped, raped, strangled and mutilated three women in 2012 and 2013.	10 years, 162 days	
Gregory McKnight	Kidnapped and murdered 20-year-old Emily Murray and hid her body in his trailer in 2000.	24 years, 23 days	McKnight had previously served seven years in a juvenile detention center for shooting and killing a man in 1992. The body of a different man was also found on McKnight's property in 2000.
Austin Myers	Orchestrated the murder of 18-year-old Justin Back.	12 years, 36 days	Timothy Mosley, Myers's accomplice, was sentenced to life in prison. Myers became the youngest inmate on death row in Ohio at the time of his sentence.
William Kessler Sapp	Raped and murdered 11-year-old Martha Leach and 12-year-old Phree Morrow in 1992. One year later, he murdered 31-year-old Belinda Anderson.	27 years, 32 days	
John Stojetz	Convicted of the racially-motivated murder of 17-year-old Damico Watkins, an African-American prisoner, at Madison Correctional Institution (Ohio).	29 years, 219 days	Stojetz, the leader of the Aryan Brotherhood, had led five members of his gang in the attack that led to Watkins's death. Stojetz was the sole member of the six to be sentenced to death, while the rest were sentenced to life for the killing. Stojetz is currently scheduled to be executed on May 19, 2027.
Christopher Whitaker	Kidnapped, raped, tortured and murdered 14-year-old Alianna DeFreeze.	8 years, 239 days	
James D. Worley	Abducted and murdered 20-year-old Sierah Joughin.	8 years, 217 days	The murder prompted the creation of Ohio Senate Bill 231 'Sierah's Law', a statute that provides for a searchable database of convicted violent felons living in the state.

=== Oklahoma ===
- On death row: 22 (as of November 20, 2026)
- Total number executed: 255 (1800–2026)

Due to the number of Oklahoma death row inmates, only prisoners with Wikipedia pages are listed.

Name	Description of crime	Time on death row	Other
Brenda Evers Andrew	Murdered 39-year-old advertising executive Rob Andrew in 2001.	22 years, 61 days	Brenda Andrew along with her lover, James Pavatt, plotted to kill Brenda's husband, Rob Andrew, to receive an $800,000 insurance payout on the victim's life. Brenda is the only woman on Oklahoma's death row. Pavatt was also sentenced to death for his role in the murder and he was executed in 2026.
Alton Alexander Nolen	Attacked two Vaughan Foods employees, beheading 54-year-old Colleen Hufford and critically wounding Traci Johnson.	8 years, 342 days	The attack followed a well-publicized series of beheadings carried out by the Islamic State.
William Lewis Reece	Raped and murdered 19-year-old Tiffany Johnston.	5 years, 95 days	Reece, a convicted kidnapper, was connected to her murder in 2015 on the basis of DNA evidence. He later confessed to three unrelated murders connected to the Texas Killing Fields, to which he pleaded guilty and was sentenced to life imprisonment.

=== Oregon ===
- On death row: 0 (as of December 13, 2022)
- Total number executed: 124 (1800–1997)

=== Pennsylvania ===
- On death row: 94 (as of November 2, 2025)
- Total number executed: 1,043 (1608–1999)

Due to the number of Pennsylvania death row inmates, only prisoners with Wikipedia pages are listed.

Name	Description of crime	Time on death row	Other
Richard Baumhammers	Racially motivated crime spree in April 2000, in Pittsburgh, killing five people and paralyzing one.	25 years, 195 days	Baumhammers was given five death sentences plus 112 years.
Arthur Jerome Bomar Jr.	Murdered 22-year-old Aimee Willard, beating her to death.	27 years, 353 days	Bomar is also suspected to have murdered Maria Cabuenos to steal her car, since he had thrown out his own at a junkyard. Willard's DNA was found on the latter, which pointed out Bomar's culpability.
John Eichinger	Stabbing murders of Heather Greaves, her sister Lisa and her daughter Avery at their home in King of Prussia on March 25, 2005.	20 years, 345 days	Eichinger is also serving a life sentence for the murder of Jennifer Still, who was murdered under similar circumstances at her house in Bridgeport in 1999.
Eric Frein	Murdered Corporal Bryon Dickson II during a State police attack in September 2014.	9 years, 201 days	
Thomas William Hawkins	Raped and murdered his 14-year-old niece Andrea Thomas at her grandparents' home in Stowe.	32 years, 89 days	Hawkins previously served six years for the 1980 murder of his 15-year-old girlfriend Karen Stubbs. He is also suspected, but never charged, in the disappearance of a female acquaintance.
Melvin Knight	Tortured, raped and murdered mentally disabled Jennifer Daugherty.	14 years, 84 days	The other four members of The Greensburg Six received long prison sentences, ranging from thirty years to life without parole. Knight appealed his sentence, but on November 15, 2018, his appeal was denied.
Ricky Smyrnes	Tortured, raped and murdered mentally disabled Jennifer Daugherty.	13 years, 267 days	Smyrnes appealed the death sentence, and his execution was delayed in July 2017.
Richard Laird	Murdered Anthony Milano because he was gay.	37 years, 126 days	Laird's co-defendant, Frank Chester, was also sentenced to death for the crime, but was resentenced to life without parole in 2016.
John Charles Lesko	Murdered Apollo police officer Leonard Miller in January 1980.	44 years, 212 days	Lesko is the longest-serving death row inmate in Pennsylvania. His co-defendant, Michael Travaglia, was also sentenced to death for the crime, but he died of natural causes on death row in 2017. Both Lesko and Travaglia were also involved in killing three more people during an eight-day period between December 1979 and January 1980, before the murder of Miller. The duo received multiple prison sentences (including life in prison) for the other homicides.
Hubert Lester Michael Jr.	Kidnapped, raped and murdered 16-year-old Trista Elizabeth Eng in July 1992.	31 years, 247 days	Michael was out on bail for a unrelated rape charge from Lancaster County at the time of Eng's abduction and murder. He was scheduled to be executed five times between 1992 and 2015, but all his warrants were delayed due to legal reasons.
Richard Andrew Poplawski	Shot and killed three Pittsburgh police officers in 2009.	15 years, 147 days	
Harvey Miguel Robinson	Raped and murdered 47-year-old Jessica Jean Fortney.	31 years, 358 days	Robinson was initially sentenced to death for three murders, but the death sentences for the first two murders were later changed to life sentences.
Christopher Roney	First-degree murder for the shooting death of police officer Lauretha Vaird.	29 years, 344 days	
Mark Spotz	Carjacking-murders of three women – June Ohlinger, Penny Gunnet and Betty Amstutz – in a three-day killing spree in 1995.	30 years, 261 days	Spotz received three death sentences for killing the women. He was also convicted of voluntary manslaughter for fatally shooting his brother during an argument, and sentenced to 17 1/2 to 35 years in prison.
Raghunandan Yandamuri	First-degree murders and kidnapping of Saanvi Venna and her grandmother, Satyavathi Venna.	12 years, 2 days	Yandamuri is one of the two only Indians on death row in the United States. His execution was delayed in January 2018.

=== South Carolina ===
- On death row: 22
- Total number executed: 690 (1700–2025)

Due to the number of South Carolina death row inmates, only prisoners with Wikipedia pages are listed.

Name	Description of crime	Time on death row	Other
Steven Bixby	Shot and killed Abbeville County Deputy Sheriff Sgt. Daniel Wilson and State Constable Donald Ouzts.	19 years, 274 days	Rita Bixby, Steven's mother, was given two life sentences, while his father, Arthur Bixby, was found mentally incompetent to stand trial and committed to a mental facility.
Jerry Buck Inman	2006 rape and murder of Tiffany Souers.	17 years, 214 days	Inman previously served time in prison for sex offences in Florida and North Carolina before he was released on probation in September 2005, nine months before the murder of Souers.
Timothy Jones Jr.	Murdered his five children in Lexington County.	7 years, 162 days	He disposed of their bodies in Alabama before later admitting to the crime.
Tyree Roberts	Murdered two police officers, Corporal Dyke Coursen and Lance Corporal Dana Lyle Tate, in Beaufort County.	23 years, 31 days	Roberts shot and killed both police officers after they responded to a domestic disturbance call made by his partner.
James William Wilson Jr.	Shot dead two 8-year-old students and wounded another seven, a teacher and a gym coach.	37 years, 195 days	

=== South Dakota ===
- On death row: 1
- Total number executed: 20 (1866–2019)

Name	Description of crime	Time on death row	Other
Briley Piper	Tortured and murdered Chester Allan Poage.	25 years, 307 days (first sentence; overturned); 15 years, 115 days (second sentence)	Piper committed the crime along with Elijah Page and Darrell Hoadley. Page was sentenced to death and executed in 2007, becoming the first person executed in South Dakota in over 60 years. Hoadley was sentenced to life in prison.

=== Tennessee ===
- On death row: 41
- Total number executed: 348 (1700–2025)

Due to the number of Tennessee death row inmates, only prisoners with Wikipedia pages are listed.

Name	Description of crime	Time on death row	Other
Lemaricus Davidson	Raped, tortured, and murdered Channon Christian and Christopher Newsom.	17 years, 23 days	Davidson's four accomplices were also sentenced but only Davidson received a death sentence.
Jessie Dotson	Shot and killed his brother, Cecil Dotson, his brother's girlfriend, Marissa Williams, and two other adults, and fatally stabbed his nephews, aged 4 and 2.	16 years, 41 days	Three other children were found seriously injured at the house. Dotson received six death sentences for the crime.
Henry Eugene Hodges	Strangled and killed 37-year-old Ronald Bassett during a robbery in 1990.	34 years, 296 days	Hodges was also convicted of killing two more people in Tennessee and Georgia, and received two additional life sentences for these crimes. Hodges confessed to at least eight murders of homosexual men between 1988 and 1990, and he remains a suspect behind some of these cases.
Henry Lee Jones	Stabbed and strangled elderly couple, Clarence and Lillian James, at their home in Bartlett on August 22, 2003, ultimately slitting their throats with a pair of scissors.	17 years, 187 days	Jones was also sentenced to death in Florida for a similar murder committed just days after these murders, and is suspected of yet another killing in that state. His first death sentence was overturned, but he was found guilty in a second trial in 2015.
Donald Ray Middlebrooks	Tortured and murdered 14-year-old Kerrick Majors.	37 years, 61 days	Middlebrooks' wife, Tammy, and their friend, Robert Brewington, were sentenced to life imprisonment for their roles in Majors' murder. They were spared the death penalty as both were under the age of 18 at the time of the offense. Middlebrooks was originally scheduled to be executed on December 8, 2022. His execution was later suspended due to an oversight in the preparation for lethal injection in another execution. Middlebrooks was then scheduled to be executed on September 24, 2025. This execution was stayed pending the conclusion of his federal litigation.
Christa Pike	Tortured and murdered her Job Corps classmate, 19-years-old Colleen Slemmer by crushing her skull with asphalt.	30 years, 237 days	Two of Pike's accomplices were also sentenced; Tadaryl Shipp was given life without parole plus 25 years, while Shadolla Peterson was sentenced to probation after testifying against her. In 2001, Pike and Natasha Cornett attempted to strangle fellow inmate Patricia Jones with a shoestring; Jones survived. Her September 30, 2026 execution was botched.

=== Texas ===
- On death row: 161 (as of November 20, 2026)
- Total number executed: 1344 (1800–2025)

Due to the number of Texas death row inmates, only prisoners with Wikipedia pages or part of a criminal enterprise with a separate Wikipedia page are listed.

Name	Description of crime	Time on death row	Other
Eugene Broxton	Shot newlyweds Waylon and Sheila Dockens during a robbery of their motel room in Channelview, killing Sheila.	34 years, 65 days	Broxton is also the prime suspect for a series of robbery-murders in Houston between March and May 1991, for which he has never been charged.
Kimberly Cargill	Murdered her son's 39-year-old babysitter Cherry Walker in 2010.	14 years, 168 days	Cargill killed Walker (who was mentally disabled) after luring her out for dinner with a purpose of preventing the victim from testifying against her in a child protective case; Cargill had dumped Walker's body, doused it in lighter fluid and set it on fire.
Linda Carty	Abducted and murdered 25-year-old Joana Rodriguez to steal her newborn son.	24 years, 260 days	Prosecutors alleged that Carty orchestrated the crime, which was committed by three masked men who abducted Rodriguez and her son. Rodriguez was later found dead in the trunk of a car. Her 3-day-old son was rescued from a car parked nearby. The other three men were arrested, but only Carty was prosecuted for capital murder. Carty claims she was framed by drug dealers in response to her work as an informant and has appealed her conviction. Her appeals have been unsuccessful and the appeal procedure has been exhausted. Barring the granting of clemency, she stands to become the first female British national to be executed since Ruth Ellis in 1955, and the first British black woman executed in more than a century.
Raul Cortez	Shot dead Rosa Barbosa, her nephew and two of his friends.	17 years, 291 days	Eddie Williams is serving 20 years, and Javier Cortez, Raul's brother, was sentenced to four years in prison.
Edgardo Rafael Cubas	Murdered two women and a 15-year-old girl, who had been kidnapped and raped.	22 years, 168 days	Eduardo Navarro, an accomplice, was 15 at the time of the crimes but was tried as an adult.
Walter Alexander Sorto	Murdered two women and a 15-year-old girl, who had been kidnapped and raped.	22 years, 346 days	Eduardo Navarro, an accomplice, was 15 at the time of the crimes but was tried as an adult.
William George Davis	Murdered four patients at a hospital in Tyler from 2017 to 2018, where he worked as a nurse, introducing air into patients’ arterial systems.	5 years, 24 days	In a call to his ex-wife in jail, Davis claimed he wanted to lengthen patients' time in the intensive care unit so he could earn more overtime.
Paul Devoe	Murdered his ex-girlfriend Paula Griffith, her teenage daughter Haylie Faulkner, Griffith's boyfriend Jay Feltner and Faulkner's 17-year-old friend Danielle Hensley	17 years, 45 days	Devoe had also murdered a bartender in Texas and an elderly woman in Pennsylvania. He was convicted of killing both Hensley and Faulkner and sentenced to death, but did not face trial for the other four homicides.
Charles Don Flores	Convicted of the murder of 64-year-old Elizabeth "Betty" Black in Farmers Branch, Texas.	27 years, 234 days	Flores maintains his innocence in the crime. No physical evidence links him to the murder, and the only eyewitness who claimed to see him at the scene was hypnotized by police during questioning. This eyewitness did not identify Flores as a suspect before being hypnotized, despite having been shown photographs of him in a photo lineup. The other suspect in Black's murder, Richard Lynn Childs, pleaded guilty to shooting her as part of a plea bargain. He was sentenced to 35 years in prison and was released on parole in 2016.
Michael Dean Gonzales	Robbed and murdered his elderly neighbors in Odessa, Texas.	30 years, 345 days	
Bartholomew Granger	Murdered 79-year-old Minnie Ray Sebolt during a courthouse shooting.	13 years, 199 days	Granger had also shot his daughter, ex-wife and another bystander during the same attack. Granger was on trial for aggravated sexual assault of his daughter (also one of the shooting victims) at the time of the shooting.
Howard Paul Guidry	Murdered 33-year-old Farah Fratta under the orders of her estranged husband Robert Fratta.	29 years, 220 days	Robert Fratta, the mastermind of his wife's murder, was sentenced to death and executed in 2023. Fratta recruited Joseph Prystash as a middleman to help him find a gunman, therefore hiring Guidry as the assassin to shoot and kill his wife. Prystash was also sentenced to death but he died of natural causes in 2025 while on death row.
Ruben Gutierrez	Robbed and murdered 85-year-old retired schoolteacher Escolastica Harrison in Brownsville, Texas.	27 years, 194 days	Gutierrez committed the crime with two others; one of them, Rene Garcia, was sentenced to life in prison while the other, Pedro Gracia, remains at large for the murder.
Randy Halprin	Murdered Irving police officer Aubrey Hawkins during a robbery.	23 years, 163 days	Halprin was convicted under the Texas law of parties.
Patrick Murphy	Murdered Irving police officer Aubrey Hawkins during a robbery.	23 years, 2 days	Murphy was the last member of the Texas Seven to be brought to trial, convicted, and sentenced to death. Murphy was also convicted under the Texas law of parties. He is scheduled to be executed on April 7, 2027.
Ronald Lee Haskell	Murdered his ex-wife's sister, her husband and four of their children in Harris County.	7 years, 37 days	Cassidy Stay was the lone survivor. She was shot, but played dead and informed police about Haskell.
Brittany Holberg	Robbed and murdered 80-year-old A. B. Towery Sr. in his home.	28 years, 240 days	The victim was struck with a hammer and stabbed nearly 60 times. The weapons used were a paring knife, a butcher knife, a grapefruit knife, and a fork. A lamp pole had been shoved more than five inches down the victim's throat.
Tanner Lynn Horner	Kidnapped and murdered seven-year-old Athena Strand in 2022.	201 days	Horner kidnapped Strand after he went to her house to deliver her Christmas present, and later assaulted and strangled her to death inside his vehicle.
William Mitchell Hudson	Murdered six members of a family at a camp site.	9 years, 6 days	Hudson's motive behind the shooting was purportedly due to his rage of losing his family's land, which was sold to one of the victims he killed. A seventh member of the family escaped unharmed during the attack.
Ali Irsan	2012 killings of his son-in-law, Coty Beavers, and Gelareh Bagherzadeh, a friend of his daughter.	8 years, 94 days	
Willie Roy Jenkins	Sexual assault and murder of 20-year-old Sheryl Norris at her apartment in San Marcos.	13 years, 161 days	Jenkins, who was detained at a mental hospital in California for four rapes committed during the 1970s, was linked to the crime via DNA. He is also a suspect in three additional murders committed from 1975 to 1977, but has not been charged.
Kristopher Love	Shot and killed Dr. Kendra Hatcher in a murder-for-hire scheme.	8 years, 7 days	His co-defendant, Brenda Delgado, who hired him to carry out the murder, was added to the FBI Ten Most Wanted Fugitives list after fleeing to Mexico. She was later captured and spared the death penalty.
Melissa Lucio	Murdered her 2-years-old daughter, Mariah Alvarez.	18 years, 102 days	Lucio was the first woman of Hispanic descent in Texas to be sentenced to death. A problematic conviction and rejected appeals led to her case being covered in the 2020 documentary The State of Texas vs. Melissa.
Otis McKane	Shooting of Benjamin Marconi.	5 years, 107 days	
Taylor Rene Parker	2020 murder of Reagan Simmons-Hancock in New Boston, Texas.	4 years, 13 days	Parker killed Simmons-Hancock before she cut open the stomach of the victim to steal her unborn daughter, who later died as well.
Rodney Reed	Abducted, raped and murdered 19-year-old Stacie Stites.	28 years, 177 days	
Robert Leslie Roberson III	Murder of his two-year-old daughter Nikki Michelle Curtis.	23 years, 274 days	
Darlie Routier	Stabbed her two sons in 1996.	29 years, 290 days	Routier's case has attracted the attention of wrongful conviction advocacy groups in recent years. She is in the process of raising funds to test evidence found at the scene for DNA.
Víctor Saldaño	Kidnapped and shot dead Paul Ray King.	30 years, 71 days	Saldaño is the sole Argentine on death row in the United States. Jorge Chávez, his co-defendant, is serving life imprisonment.
Gustavo Tijerina Sandoval	Shot United States Border Patrol agent Javier Vega Jr.	8 years, 170 days	Ismael Hernandez Vallejo was sentenced to 50 years in prison. Both men were undocumented Mexican citizens.
Erica Sheppard	Robbed and murdered 43-year-old Marilyn Meagher in 1993	31 years, 211 days	Sheppard and a male accomplice, James Dickerson, robbed Meagher of her car and killed her by stabbing and beating with a statue. Dickerson was also sentenced to death, but he died on death row in 1999 due to AIDS. Sheppard is the longest-serving female prisoner on Texas's death row.
Andre Thomas	Murdered his estranged wife, 4-year-old son, and 13-month-old daughter on March 27, 2004.	21 years, 205 days	Residing in a psychiatric unit because of doubts about his mental health, since he removed his right eye on April 1, 2004, and then removed and consumed his left eye on December 9, 2008.
Jason Thornburg	Serial killer who murdered and dismembered three people at Fort Worth, Texas in 2021.	1 year, 353 days	Thornburg had also engaged in cannibalism by eating some of the victim's body parts and organs. Thornburg additionally confessed to murdering his girlfriend at Arizona in 2017, and also killed a roommate in May 2021 in Texas.
Carlos Trevino	Raped and stabbed to death a 15-year-old girl in San Antonio.	29 years, 142 days	Scheduled to be executed on April 6, 2026.
Lucky Ward	Strangled two people in September 2010 in Houston, during separate incidents	6 years, 254 days	Ward is considered the prime suspect in a series of at least four similar murders dating back to 1985, but was not charged with them due to lack of sufficient evidence for a conviction.
Faryion Wardrip	Raped and murdered five women in the 1980s.	27 years, 13 days	Wardrip was sentenced to 35 years in prison in 1986. He was released on December 11, 1997, but was sentenced to death on November 9, 1999, after he confessed to murdering Terry Sims. In December 2014, Wardrip's appeal was dismissed by the Texas Court of Criminal Appeals.
Eric Lyle Williams	Shot and killed three people in Kaufman County, including Criminal District Attorney Michael McLelland.	11 years, 339 days	Williams's wife and accomplice, Kimberly Irene Williams, was tried separately, and sentenced to 40 years in prison.
David Leonard Wood	Rapes and murders of six women in El Paso from May to August 1987, whose bodies were later found buried in the desert.	33 years, 312 days	Wood is also a suspect in the disappearances of three other young girls and women. He has denied responsibility for the crimes and has repeatedly attempted to have his sentence overturned, but so far has been unsuccessful.
Jeffery Lee Wood	Party to the shooting of gas station clerk Kriss Lee Keeran.	28 years, 265 days	On January 2, 1996, Wood and Daniel Earl Reneau robbed a Kerrville gas station. While Wood waited outside, Reneau shot the clerk because he did not cooperate. Wood was convicted under the Texas law of parties and his death row conviction has been regarded as controversial, as he was not present during the murder. Reneau was executed on June 13, 2002.

=== Utah ===
- On death row: 3
- Total number executed: 52 (1800–2024)

Name	Description of crime	Time on death row	Other
Michael Anthony Archuleta	Kidnapped, raped, tortured and murdered 28-year-old Gordon Church on November 21, 1988.	36 years, 336 days	Lance Wood, his co-defendant, was sentenced to life in prison for his role in the murder. Assigned lethal injection as his method of execution.
Troy Kell	Stabbed fellow inmate, Lonnie Blackmon, 67 times on July 6, 1994.	30 years, 106 days	At the time, Kell was serving a life sentence in Nevada for the 1986 murder of 21-year-old James "Cotton" Kelly, who had been stalking 15-year-old Sandy Shaw, a long-time friend of Kell's. Has selected firing squad as his method of execution.
Von Lester Taylor	Murdered 49-year-old Kaye Tiede and her mother, 76-year-old Beth Potts near Beaver Springs, Summit County.	35 years, 182 days	Edward Deli, his co-defendant, was sentenced to life in prison. They also shot Tiede's husband, who survived, and attempted to set him on fire. Later they kidnapped their two daughters. Has selected lethal injection as his method of execution.

=== Wyoming ===
- On death row: 0
- Total number executed: 23 (1866–1992)

== Jurisdictions without the death penalty ==
Twenty-three states have abolished capital punishment, though crimes committed in these states are still eligible for the death penalty if the offender is convicted in federal court for certain federal crimes.

While capital punishment has been abolished in New Hampshire, this is only for new sentences: one prisoner (Michael Addison) who was already sentenced to death remains on death row in the state.

States and the date of abolition of capital punishment:

1. Michigan (1846; abolished for murder, retained for treason until 1963)
2. Wisconsin (1853)
3. Maine (1887)
4. Minnesota (1911)
5. Hawaii (1948; prior to statehood)
6. Alaska (1957; prior to statehood)
7. Vermont (1964; abolished for murder, retained for treason until 1972)
8. Iowa (1965)
9. West Virginia (1965)
10. North Dakota (1973)
11. Massachusetts (1984)
12. Rhode Island (1984)
13. New Jersey (2007)
14. New York (2007)
15. New Mexico (2009)
16. Illinois (2011)
17. Connecticut (2012)
18. Maryland (2013)
19. Delaware (2016)
20. Washington (2018)
21. New Hampshire (2019)
22. Colorado (2020)
23. Virginia (2021)

Territories and federal district:

1. Puerto Rico (1929)
2. Northern Mariana Islands (before 1970; prior to Commonwealth status)
3. Guam (1978)
4. Washington, D.C. (1981)
5. United States Virgin Islands (1991)

== See also ==
- Capital punishment in the United States
- List of people executed in the United States in 2026
- List of people scheduled to be executed in the United States
- List of most recent executions by jurisdiction
- List of death row inmates in Japan
- List of death row inmates in the United States who have exhausted their appeals
