= 2012 Hustle Mart shooting =

2012 convenience store shooting and triple murder in Farmville, North Carolina

- Surveillance camera screenshot showing the perpetrators entering the store
- Location: Farmville, North Carolina, United States
- Date: April 1, 2012
- Attack type: Murders by shooting Robbery
- Victims: Mokbel Mohamed Almujanahi; Gaber Alawi; Nabil Nasser Saeed Al'mogannahi
- Verdict: Guilty
- Convictions: Anthony; First-degree murder (3 counts); Second-degree murder (2 counts) (Note: These convictions along with 1 of the robbery convictions were for the murders of Quantellis Tyvon Carr and Jasmine Leticia Chesson on March 18. Whitehead was also present for this crime.); Robbery with a dangerous weapon (2 counts); Whitehead; First-degree murder (3 counts); Accessory to second-degree murder (2 counts); Robbery with a dangerous weapon Shamble; Second-degree murder (3 counts); Robbery with a dangerous weapon Blount; Second-degree murder (3 counts); Robbery with a dangerous weapon
- Sentence: Anthony; Death; Whitehead; Life without parole Shamble; 13 to 18 years' imprisonment Blount; 115 to 150 months' imprisonment
- Convicted: Antwan Anthony; Willie Whitehead; Xavier Shamble; Raekwon Blount

On April 1, 2012, three employees – 16-year-old Mokbel "Sam" Mohamed Almujanahi, 24-year-old Gaber Alawi, and 26-year-old Nabil Nasser Saeed Al'mogannahi – were robbed and shot to death at a convenience store in rural Farmville, North Carolina. Investigations into the case led to the capture of four male suspects, including a 14-year-old juvenile.

Two of the perpetrators, Willie Odell Whitehead Jr. and Antwan Anthony, were both found guilty of first-degree murder. Anthony was sentenced to death as the shooter of the case, while Whitehead, who planned the robbery and murders, was sentenced to life without parole. The remaining two co-defendants, Xavier Montel Shamble and Raekwon Blount, pleaded guilty to lesser charges of second-degree murder and were sentenced to prison terms: 13 to 18 years for Shamble and 115 to 150 months (or 9 years and 7 months to 12 years and 6 months) for Blount.

== Murders ==
On April 1, 2012, a group of four men arrived at the Hustle Mart, a local convenience store in rural Farmville, North Carolina, where they intended to commit armed robbery. Originally, the group planned to rob a drug dealer on that same day, and also bought some ammunition and a green 1994 Chrysler Concorde to prepare for their robbery plot. However, their intended victim did not show up after they waited outside the apartment complex for some time to go after him. On their way back home, one of the four men, 29-year-old Antwan Andre Anthony, suggested that they should go rob a convenience store, and they later selected the Hustle Mart as their target.

Three of the four men – Anthony, 19-year-old Xavier Montel Shamble and 14-year-old Raekwon Terrell Blount – entered the store, while the fourth man, 23-year-old Willie Odell Whitehead Jr., waited for the others inside the car. While in the premises, Anthony confronted the store's employees at gunpoint while Blount retrieved the money from the cash register. Anthony shot and killed the three employees: 16-year-old Mokbel "Sam" Mohamed Almujanahi, 24-year-old Gaber Alawi, and 26-year-old Nabil Nasser Saeed Al'mogannahi. After the shootings, the gunmen left the store, and rejoined Whitehead in the car before they escaped.

A customer discovered the bodies of the trio after the robbers fled the store. One of them, Gaber, died at the scene while the other two, Nabil and Sam, were rushed to hospital but they succumbed to their injuries. Autopsy reports later concluded that the men died as a result of gunshot wounds to their heads. Sam was the son of the store's owner, while both Nabil and Gaber were his cousins. The trio were part of an immigrant family from Yemen.

Prior to the triple shooting, three of the killers were only released from prison merely months or weeks leading up to the crime. Anthony was previously incarcerated in several prisons in Connecticut from 2002 to 2012. He was first convicted and jailed for second-degree assault charges, but while in prison, he was convicted thrice of assaulting corrections officers, and his sentence was therefore extended on each occasion, before he was released on January 21, 2012, and was allowed to serve his five-year parole period in North Carolina, where his family resided. Shamble was similarly released from prison only three weeks for an unspecified offence before the murders. Whitehead was released months prior in August 2012 for possession of a weapon by a felon. He also had antecedents since 2004 for various offences such as robbery with a dangerous weapon and larceny.

== Charges ==
After the murders, the police conducted a manhunt for three of the suspects, based on the CCTV footage that captured them. The family and Crimestoppers also put up a $10,000 reward for any crucial information leading to the arrest of the murderers.

On April 4, 2012, the four men – Antwan Anthony, Raekwon Blount, Xavier Shamble, and Willie Whitehead – were all arrested. They were charged with three counts each of first-degree murder, first-degree kidnapping, robbery with a dangerous weapon and one count of conspiracy to commit robbery.

On April 25, 2012, 25-year-old Zipporah Rochell Purvis was the fifth person to be charged pertaining to the Hustle Mart shootings, and she faced three counts of accessory after the fact to murder.

On August 15, 2012, Blount, the only juvenile amongst the four, was ordered to be tried as an adult for first-degree murder charges. Given that he was 14 at the time of the offences, Blount would not be sentenced to death in accordance with North Carolina state law. He was formally indicted by a Pitt County grand jury on August 28, 2012. Blount's 29-year-old mother, Valerie Denise Blount, was charged with one count of contributing to the delinquency of a minor, and she was the sixth person charged in this case.

On September 25, 2012, 25-year-old Ashley Dorthell Johnson was indicted by a grand jury on three counts of being an accessory after the fact of first-degree murder, therefore becoming the seventh person to be arrested and charged in connection to the shootings.

On October 9, 2012, 28-year-old Timmy Odell House, the older brother of Whitehead, was also charged for allegedly helping his brother and the other three killers to destroy the clothes that they wore during the robbery-murders.

On April 13, 2015, Anthony was set to stand trial on September 29, 2015.

On July 16, 2015, a judge denied Anthony's request to replace District Attorney Kimberly Robb with another prosecutor in his upcoming trial.

On January 11, 2016, Anthony was rescheduled to stand trial on February 8, 2016, for the triple murder.

=== Additional murder charges against Whitehead and Anthony ===
Before they stood trial for the Hustle Mart murders, both Anthony and Whitehead were charged with killing two more people in an unrelated case. In this case, on March 18, 2012, the pair killed a couple, 33-year-old Quantellis Tyvon Carr and 31-year-old Jasmine Leticia Chesson, by fatally shooting them in their heads at their home in Princeville, North Carolina. Another three suspects were also charged in connection to the case.

On March 9, 2015, before the start of his trial for the double murder, Anthony pleaded guilty to one count of robbery with a dangerous weapon and two counts of second-degree murder. He was subsequently sentenced to 621 to 782 months in prison, equivalent to approximately 52 to 65 years.

On October 23, 2015, Whitehead pleaded guilty to two counts of accessory after the fact to second-degree murder, and he was sentenced to 87 and 117 months in prison by Superior Court Judge Walter H. Godwin.

=== Alleged plot to kill sheriff ===
In October 2012, Whitehead allegedly plotted to kidnap Pitt County Sheriff Neil Elks, his wife and a prosecutor's child, so as to regain his freedom from prison. He also intended to kill them if it was required, and he also discussed about his plot with other inmates and people he contacted outside the jail. Howeber, his plan was foiled after an informant alerted the authorities about it.

On October 17, 2012, Whitehead was charged with two counts of solicitation to commit first-degree murder and two counts of solicitation to commit first-degree kidnapping. He was held under a $3 million bond in a state prison. In February 2014, Whitehead requested to have his bond reduced to $100,000 for all the charges, but the judge turned down the bond reduction application.

== Perpetrators ==
=== Antwan Anthony ===
Antawn Anthony was the first of the four perpetrators to be put on trial for the Hustle Mart murders, and his trial began on February 8, 2016, and jury selection took place later that same month.

On March 21, 2016, after deliberating the case for over an hour, the jury found Anthony guilty of three counts of first-degree murder.

The sentencing trial of Anthony began on March 23, 2016, and closing arguments were made on April 1, 2016, with the prosecution seeking the death penalty based on the brutality of the crimes, which were committed in furtherance of Anthony's determination to eliminate witnesses and avoid going back to prison, and how his actions left an impact on the families of the victims. The defence, on the other hand, asked for a life sentence on the grounds that Anthony was suffering from impaired mental responsibility at the time of the shootings.

On April 6, 2016, Anthony was sentenced to death by the trial judge upon the jury's unanimous recommendation for capital punishment. Anthony was the first defendant from Pitt County to be sentenced to death in 16 years after Mark Squires was last condemned to death row by the county in 2000.

=== Willie Whitehead ===
Willie Whitehead was the second defendant of the case to stand trial, and his trial began at Pitt County on September 16, 2016. On September 26, 2016, Whitehead was found guilty of three counts of first-degree murder and robbery with a dangerous weapon. After his conviction, Whitehead was sentenced to life imprisonment without the possibility of parole for each of the three murder charges, in addition to 115 months to 150 months in prison for the robbery charge.

=== Raekwon Blount ===
On November 2, 2016, Raekwon Blount reached a plea agreement with the prosecution, and pleaded guilty to three counts of second-degree murder and one count of robbery with a dangerous weapon. He was sentenced to 115 to 150 months' imprisonment, and the time he served was also credited into the sentence.

=== Xavier Shamble ===
On November 4, 2016, Xavier Shamble was the fourth and final suspect to be convicted of the Hustle Mart shootings, after he accepted a plea deal from the prosecution and admitted to three lesser counts of second degree murder and one count of armed robbery. After entering his plea, Shamble was sentenced to 13 and 18 years in prison by the court.

== Appeal process ==
In June 2016, two months after he was condemned to death row, Antwan Anthony filed an appeal for a new trial for the Hustle Mart murders.

On August 4, 2016, a Pitt County judge rejected Anthony's appeal for a new trial.

After his sentencing, Willie Whitehead filed an appeal to the North Carolina Court of Appeals against his conviction and sentence. On September 18, 2018, the North Carolina Court of Appeals denied Whitehead's appeal.

== Aftermath ==
In November 2021, nine years after the Hustle Mart shootings, true crime documentary series See No Evil re-enacted the Hustle Mart case and aired it as the fourth episode of the show's eighth season.

About 11 years after the Hustle Mart shootings, one of the perpetrators, Raekwon Blount, was released from prison on September 28, 2023, and he was required to be under post-release supervision for one year until September 27, 2024. However, three months later, on January 18, 2024, Blount was once again arrested as a suspect behind the murder of Zytorius Jahod Ruffin that same month, and he was charged with accessory after the fact to murder.

== See also ==
- Capital punishment in North Carolina
- List of death row inmates in the United States § North Carolina
