= Michael Dean Gonzales =

American man convicted of murder on death row

- Born: September 1, 1973 (age 53); Odessa, Texas, U.S.
- Other name: Spider
- Status: On death row
- Conviction: Capital murder (two counts)
- Penalty: Death (December 12, 1995)

Michael Dean Gonzales (born September 1, 1973) is an American man convicted of capital murder in Texas and sentenced to death row.

== Crime ==
Gonzales lived next door to Manuel (age 73) and Merced "Bita" Aguirre (age 65) in Odessa, Texas, for years. On the evening of April 21, 1994, Gonzales broke into the Aguirre home while they were sleeping. The Aguirres awoke, and Gonzales stabbed the Aguirres and then burglarized the home. Merced was reported to have defensive wounds on her legs, hands and the bottoms of her feet. Manuel Aguirre was stabbed 11 times. Gonzales stole a VCR, a microwave oven, a camera, a .22-caliber revolver and a purse.

=== Legal proceedings ===
Prosecutors charged Gonzales with capital murder. On Monday, November 27, 1995, jury selection began for the trial. At the time, it had been ten years since Ector County prosecutors had sought the death penalty. A medical examiner in the trial testified that Merced Aguirre's stab wounds were "too numerous to count." Gonzales was convicted of murder for both Manuel and Merced and was sentenced to death on December 12, 1995. The Texas Court of Criminal Appeals affirmed the conviction and sentence and denied the defendant’s initial state habeas application.

Gonzales' death sentence was later thrown out because of improper trial testimony from a prison psychologist. In 2009, Gonzales was retried on punishment. On May 7, 2009, the court again sentenced the defendant to death in accordance with the findings of the jury. The Court of Criminal Appeals affirmed the sentence and later dismissed the defendant's state habeas application. Gonzales appealed, and in June 2015, the Texas Court of Criminal Appeals stated that Gonzales' appeal was improperly filed and rejected it without considering its merits.

On September 1, 2021, the court set Gonzales' execution date for March 8, 2022. The Aguirre family planned to attend the execution. On March 3, 2022, Gonzales received a reprieve.

== See also ==
- List of death row inmates in the United States
- List of people scheduled to be executed in the United States
