= Shonelle Jackson =

American convicted murderer on death row

- Mugshot of Jackson taken by the Alabama Department of Corrections
- Born: May 30, 1978 (age 48)
- Known for: Alabama Death Row Inmate

Shonelle Andre Jackson (born May 30, 1978) is an American prison inmate currently on Alabama's death row. In 1997, at the age of 19, Jackson was arrested for the murder of Lefrick Moore that occurred during the commission of a robbery in Montgomery, Alabama. During the investigation, Jackson initially told detectives that he did not know the three other co-defendants, and was not present at the time of the murder. Montgomery Police Detective Andrew Signore, having learned from the other defendants that just before the murder, Jackson had purchased a soft drink from a local drive-thru, informed him that his fingerprints were found on a Dairy Queen cup located inside the victim's stolen vehicle. At the time, Detective Signore did not know if any latent fingerprints had been discovered on the cup but advanced this deception to encourage Jackson to admit to knowing the other defendants and being present with them at some point during the night of the murder. Jackson then admitted that he knew the other defendants and had been with them earlier in the day before the murder. He then asked to amend his statement a third time to admit he was present at the time of the murder and was armed with a .380 handgun. Following a jury trial, he was found guilty of capital murder. In sentencing Jackson, the presiding judge, William Gordon, overrode the jury's unanimous recommendation of a life sentence and instead imposed the death sentence. Judicial override of a jury's sentencing recommendation is permitted under Alabama law. Later, in a sworn deposition, juror Jan Burkes expressed uncertainty that Jackson, one of four defendants charged with this crime, fired the shot that killed Moore.

== See also ==
- List of death row inmates in the United States
