= Murder of Janaya Thompson =

2014 murder and rape of a five-year-old girl in Mississippi

Janaya Thompson
- Born: Janaya Makayia Thompson; October 15, 2008; Mississippi, U.S.
- Died: July 26, 2014 (aged 5); Gulfport, Mississippi, U.S.
- Cause of death: Strangulation
- Resting place: Pine Ridge Gardens Cemetery
- Other name: Ja'Naya Thompson
- Occupation: Student
- Known for: Abduction, rape, and murder victim

On July 16, 2014, in Gulfport, Mississippi, five-year-old Janaya Makayia Thompson (October 15, 2008 – July 16, 2014) was abducted outside her apartment by Alberto Julio Garcia (born January 22, 1985), who raped and murdered the girl by hanging her in an abandoned trailer, where her body was found 12 hours after her disappearance. Garcia was arrested and charged with capital murder. He pleaded guilty and was sentenced to death in January 2017, and he is currently on death row awaiting execution as of 2026.

== Murder ==
On the evening of July 16, 2014, five-year-old Janaya Makayia Thompson was last seen playing with her neighbor outside her apartment in Gulfport, Mississippi. Sometime prior to 5:30pm, Thompson encountered 29-year-old Alberto Garcia, who was a resident of the same apartment complex. Garcia kidnapped the girl, and took her to an abandoned trailer, where he raped the girl before he hanged her with a pair of socks tied around her neck from the shower window. Thompson died as a result of the hanging.

Meanwhile, at around 5:30pm, Thompson's mother discovered that her daughter had gone missing after she called out to the girl to no avail. Thompson's family went to search for the missing girl for two hours, but their efforts ended up fruitless, and as a result, Thompson was reported missing. The police, neighbours and volunteers joined in a large-scale operation to find Thompson, and at one point, the family sought help from Garcia, who pretended to volunteer and help find the girl along with the other neighbours.

About 12 hours after her disappearance, Thompson's body was found inside the same trailer where Garcia had raped and hung her to death. The trailer was located about 50 yards away from Thompson's apartment. An autopsy report certified that the cause of death was ligature strangulation caused by hanging, and there were also scratch marks on Thompson's neck, indicating that the girl tried to free herself from the noose before her death. There were signs of sexual penetration of her vagina and anus, thus confirming that the girl had been raped before her death.

== Arrest and charges ==
While investigations into the murder were ongoing, the police eventually probed Alberto Garcia as a witness. During the initial conversation, Garcia reportedly told detectives that his fingerprints might be inside the trailer. He explained that he had entered the trailer several days earlier and had taken several items. Detectives then read Garcia his Miranda rights and arrested him on a burglary charge. In his initial statements, Garcia stated he had been at his apartment playing video games on the night Janaya Thompson was killed and that he might have blacked out. Garcia also said that he later smelled feces on himself, did not know what had happened, and took a shower.

Five days later, while in jail, Garcia once again requested to speak to investigators, and he claimed that another man had come to his apartment on the night of the murder and implicated the man as the possible killer, claiming that the man confessed to having been involved in an incident with a little girl and needed help. As a result of this statement, the man, identified as Julian Casper Gray, was arrested as a person of interest in the case, although he and Garcia did not face charges at that point, because both were detained at the Harrison County Adult Detention Facility for charges unrelated to Thompson's death; Gray was charged with raping an adult woman back in April 2014.

Ultimately, preliminary DNA tests matched Garcia's DNA profile to those of the suspect found on the girl's body during the autopsy, and the investigations also revealed multiple inconsistencies between the evidence and Garcia's differing versions of his account. On July 23, 2014, Garcia was officially charged with capital murder for killing and raping Thompson. Under Mississippi state law, the offence of capital murder carries a sentence of either life imprisonment without the possibility of parole or the death penalty. Garcia eventually confessed to the rape and murder of Thompson during later interrogations.

Gray, the other suspect, was not charged with the murder of Thompson because the evidence did not credibly link him to the crime. However, in March 2015, Gray was arrested on two counts of exploitation of a child for possession of child pornography, and was also charged with two counts of exploitation of a child, sexual battery and rape. In July 2017, Gray was sentenced to 30 years in prison, with 10 years suspended, after he pleaded guilty to forcible sexual intercourse and exploitation of a child.

== Trial proceedings ==
=== Pre-trial ===
Since his arrest on July 18, 2014, Alberto Garcia was placed under protective custody by the Mississippi state authorities, and isolated from the other inmates during his detention. According to the Harrison County Jail Warden David Sanderson, Garcia had received several death threats on his life, primarily because he was accused of raping and murdering a young girl, and this was the typical situation for those who were charged with crimes against children. Sanderson also stated that Garcia was placed on additional suicide watch because he had attempted suicide at least once while in detention.

On October 5, 2015, a Harrison County grand jury formally indicted Garcia for the capital murder of Janaya Thompson.

On October 30, 2015, Garcia officially pleaded not guilty to the capital murder charge. Harrison County prosecutors expressed their intent to seek the death penalty for Garcia, whose trial was tentatively scheduled to begin on July 18, 2016.

The date of Garcia's trial was eventually pushed back to October 10, 2016. In July 2016, Garcia was undergoing pre-trial psychiatric evaluation to determine his mental state.

In September 2016, a month before Garcia was set to stand trial, the trial date was once again postponed, and re-scheduled to take place in January 2017.

=== Guilty plea and death penalty ===
On January 18, 2017, Garcia pleaded guilty to the capital murder charge on the eve of his scheduled murder trial. As a result of the plea, Garcia would undergo a sentencing trial before a judge, who would decide whether to sentence Garcia to the death penalty or life without parole.

On January 23, 2017, Garcia's sentencing trial began at the Harrison County Circuit Court. More than 20 family members and friends of the victim attended the hearing, in which the judge was presented with the evidence and crime scene photos as she considered whether to impose the death sentence. While presenting his case, District Attorney Joel Smith stated that it was important for the court to understand how "horrendous" the nature of the crime was and also stated that as a father himself, he could not imagine the "daily heartache" the parents experienced by losing a child because of the actions of the defendant, and even Garcia's defence lawyer became emotional while making his submissions.

On January 25, 2017, Garcia was sentenced to death by Harrison County Circuit Court Judge Lisa Dodson, who described Garcia's actions as "inexcusable" and cited the "brutal, cold and torturous" nature of Thompson's murder, and hence decided that Garcia deserved no mercy for having killed the victim. Garcia was reportedly emotionless in court as the death sentence was passed, and he declined to make a statement in court. Thompson's family and friends were reportedly relieved at the sentence, and both the Gulfport Police Chief Leonard Papania and District Attorney Joel Smith commended them for their "strength and courage" throughout the two-year period of seeking justice for Thompson. Chief Papania also condemned Garcia as "pure evil" for the torture and killing of the girl.

== Appeals and current status ==
2022 Mugshot of Alberto Julio Garcia

On May 14, 2020, the Mississippi Supreme Court rejected Alberto Garcia's direct appeal against his death sentence.

On September 11, 2020, the Mississippi Supreme Court turned down Garcia's application to rehear his appeal.

On February 16, 2023, Garcia's appeal for post-conviction relief was dismissed by the Mississippi Supreme Court.

On June 1, 2023, the Mississippi Supreme Court denied Garcia's second appeal for post-conviction relief.

On September 7, 2023, the Mississippi Supreme Court denied a petition by Garcia to rehear his post-conviction appeal.

A November 2023 report revealed that Garcia was one of the 37 condemned inmates remaining on Mississippi's death row. As of 2026, Garcia is still awaiting execution at the Mississippi State Penitentiary.

== Aftermath ==
The murder of Janaya Thompson brought shock and sadness to the local community of Gulfport, and many residents expressed relief when Alberto Garcia was arrested and charged for the crime. During the first few weeks after the crime, there were public rallies held by residents and civil groups like Operations Help Civil Rights Group, where many participants sought justice for the victim.

On October 15, 2014, the sixth birthday of Thompson, the family, friends and neighbours of the girl gathered to celebrate her birthday in remembrance of the girl.

On July 16, 2015, the first anniversary of Thompson's death, the neighbours of Thompson stated that they still remembered the girl, whose death continued to leave an emotional impact on the community. In another interview, Thompson's father stated that he still missed his daughter, and he had to see a therapist to cope with the loss of his daughter, and he also suffered from depression as a result of Thompson's death.

Thompson's cousin set up an organization called the "Purple Village" in remembrance of her late cousin, and the group planned to hold a vigil on October 15, 2015, which was Thompson's seventh birthday, and Thompson's cousin strived to advocate against child sexual crimes in the upcoming event.

== See also ==
- List of murdered American children
- Capital punishment in Mississippi
- List of death row inmates in the United States § Mississippi
