= Curtis Clinton =

American serial killer (born 1971)

Curtis Leon Clinton
- Born: April 24, 1971 (age 55); Ohio, U.S.
- Status: Incarcerated on death row
- Convictions: 1999: Involuntary manslaughter; 2013: Aggravated murder (x3); Rape (x3); Aggravated burglary
- Penalty: 1999: 13 years' imprisonment; 2013: Death

Details
- Victims: 4 confirmed, 5 total suspected
- Date: 1997 – 2012
- Country: United States
- State: Ohio
- Locations: Fostoria, Ohio; Sandusky, Ohio
- Imprisoned at: Ross Correctional Institution

Curtis Leon Clinton (born April 24, 1971) is an American serial killer convicted of four homicides. In April 1997, Clinton killed 18-year-old Misty Keckler inside her house in Fostoria, Ohio, which he said was an accidental strangulation while having consensual sex. Clinton was sentenced to 13 years in prison after he agreed to plead guilty to involuntary manslaughter in exchange for avoiding potential murder charges.

Clinton was released from prison in February 2012, but in September of that year, in Sandusky, Ohio, Clinton murdered 23-year-old Heather Jackson, and also killed her two children, 18-month-old Wayne Jr. and three-year-old Celine; the three-year-old was also raped before her death. Clinton was found guilty of three counts of aggravated murder and sentenced to death. He was also named a suspect behind the unsolved 1994 murder and rape of 73-year-old Ida May "Todd" Franklin.

== Killing of Misty Keckler ==
On April 3, 1997, Curtis Leon Clinton killed his first victim, 18-year-old Misty Keckler, at her acquaintance's mobile home in Fostoria, Ohio. Keckler, the youngest of 11 in her family, was found naked and face down in the bathtub; she had been last seen going to the mobile home to spend the night after departing from her sister's apartment the night before. Wood County Coroner Douglas Hess conducted the autopsy and certified that the cause of death was strangulation, and ruled Keckler's death as a homicide.

The prosecution and police stated that Clinton had a motive to commit the murder, because Keckler had helped Clinton's 14-year-old girlfriend after she ran away from home. Enraged, Clinton swore to "take care of anyone who helped her". Prior to Keckler's murder, Clinton was convicted of sexually assaulting a 14-year-old girl, and was required to register himself as a sex offender. In Clinton's statement to the police and court, he stated that he accidentally killed Keckler by strangulation while they were having consensual sex, after he was allowed into the trailer by Keckler without force. According to his lawyer, Clinton was known to choke women during sexual intercourse, and two of Clinton's ex-girlfriends corroborated this fact when they testified.

The murder of Keckler remained unsolved for nearly a year before Clinton was identified as the perpetrator while serving a 16-month term in prison for a separate sex offense. In that case, Clinton was charged with the sexual assault of a minor two months after the murder, and he fled Ohio in late 1997 while the case was pending before the courts. Clinton was caught in January 1998 by FBI agents at a restaurant in suburban San Diego, and he was charged with unlawful flight to evade prosecution and bond default. The Craven Bail Bond Agency, which posted $6,000 in bond for Clinton while he was charged with the June 1997 sex case, originally had the bond forfeited after Clinton absconded, but the bond forfeiture was reversed by the 6th District Court of Appeals in October 1998.

== First murder trial ==
On June 17, 1998, after he was linked to Keckler's death, Clinton was indicted by a Wood County grand jury for one count of murder. Pursuant to Ohio state law, if found guilty of murder, Clinton faced a potential sentence of 15 years to life in prison.

On July 29, 1998, Clinton's murder trial was set to begin on October 19, 1998. In late October 1998, before Clinton was set to stand trial, scheduling conflicts once again led to the delay of Clinton's trial until December 14, 1998. Clinton later fired his court-appointed counsel and a new lawyer was assigned to his case in December 1998.

In January 1999, Clinton was resceheduled to stand trial on May 17, 1999, for Keckler's killing. On May 17, 1999, the trial judge granted a third postponement of the trial because Clinton's lawyer underwent a heart catheterization, and his prognosis was yet to be confirmed at that point.

On July 30, 1999, Clinton was charged with additional counts of assault after he got into a physical dispute with several corrections officers while they were trying to restrain him.

On August 3, 1999, Clinton accepted a plea deal offered by the prosecution, pleading guilty to one reduced count of involuntary manslaughter and two counts of assault. The deal allowed him to avoid a murder conviction and the possibility of a life sentence. Judge Robert Pollex sentenced Clinton to 13 years' imprisonment, which consisted of the maximum term of ten years for manslaughter and 18 months each for both counts of assault. The judge remarked that Clinton deserved the maximum sentences since he had committed the "worst form" of the offenses.

== Jackson family murders ==
After serving his sentence, Clinton was released from prison in February 2012, but seven months after he regained his freedom, Clinton committed a triple murder in Sandusky, Ohio. Clinton additionally committed the rape of a 17-year-old girl five days before the triple murder, and was considered a person of interest in another rape case that happened during the summer of 2012.

On September 8, 2012, Clinton entered the house of Heather Jackson, an acquaintance he had known for five months. Inside the residence, Clinton attacked and strangled Heather, before he killed Heather's two young children, 18-month-old Wayne Jackson Jr. and three-year-old Celine Jackson. Clinton also raped Celine before he choked her to death. After murdering the Jacksons, Clinton drove away from the house. The bodies of the three victims were found later that evening after two acquaintances arrived at Heather's house to check on her.

Erie County Coroner Brian Baxter conducted an autopsy on the three victims and in his preliminary findings, he certified the cause of death as strangulation. Additionally, anal swabs were taken from Celine and seminal fluid was detected through the testing, which proved that the girl was raped before her death, and the DNA profile was later matched to Clinton.

Clinton was subsequently identified as a suspect, and on September 10, 2012, two days after the crime, Clinton was arrested and was detained at the Erie County Jail on suspicion of murdering the Jacksons.

In the aftermath of the killings, the surviving kin of the Jacksons received donations from members of the public, and they set up a "Heather Jackson Family Fund" at a local bank in Sandusky with the donation money they received. A fundraising car show was also scheduled to take place in Sandusky in remembrance of the victims.

== Second trial and death sentence ==
After his arrest, Clinton was charged with three counts of aggravated murder for the triple murder and one count of rape for the 17-year-old girl's case, and he was held on a $3,000,000 bond for the murder charges, plus an additional $25,000 bond for the rape case. On September 19, 2012, an Erie County grand jury indicted Clinton on charges of rape and aggravated murder, and the prosecution announced their intent to seek the death penalty for the murders.

Clinton's trial was scheduled to begin in early October 2013 with jury selection. Prior to the beginning of Clinton's trial, relatives of the victims requested that the prosecution offer a plea agreement to Clinton in exchange for life in prison without parole, because they did not want to face a lengthy trial ahead for the triple murder case. However, the prosecution refused the family's request. The trial began with opening statements on October 28, 2013, after a 12-member jury was seated to hear the case.

On November 4, 2013, the jury found Clinton guilty of aggravated murder and rape on all counts. After the guilty verdict, the families of the Jacksons and Misty Keckler gathered in a ceremony at the Arcadia Cemetery to honor the victims. Keckler's friends, one of whom named her daughter after the victim, expressed relief at Clinton's conviction and they found closure with the fact that Clinton could receive the death penalty for the triple murder. Keckler's father stated that he attended the trial of Clinton daily until it concluded; Keckler's mother had died of a heart condition years prior and her ashes were buried alongside her daughter.

On November 12, 2013, the jury unanimously voted to impose the death penalty for Clinton.

On November 14, 2013, Clinton was formally sentenced to death by the trial court after the judge accepted the jury's recommendation for capital punishment.

== Death row ==
=== Suspected crime ===
A week after Clinton was condemned to die, authorities reopened the investigation into the 1994 murder of 73-year-old Ida May Franklin. According to reports, Franklin was found dead in her Sandusky, Ohio, home on April 9, 1994, when her niece arrived for a visit and discovered her body beneath a mattress propped against a couch. A bloodstained knife was also recovered at the scene. Investigators noted several similarities between Franklin's killing and Clinton's previous homicides, leading them to identify him as a potential suspect. Additionally, a local resident reportedly tipped off police, stating that Clinton had once lived in the same neighborhood as Franklin and frequently visited her. As of 2026, the case remains unsolved and no charges were made against Clinton in this killing.

=== Appeals ===
On December 19, 2017, Clinton's appeal against his death sentence was denied by the Ohio Supreme Court.

On February 8, 2018, the Ohio Supreme Court dismissed Clinton's second appeal against his sentence. After the appeal's dismissal, the Ohio Supreme Court authorized an execution date of September 15, 2021, for Clinton, although the date was likely to be delayed while pending further appeals against the death sentence.

In September 2018, Clinton petitioned to the Ohio Supreme Court to stay his execution until all his post-conviction appeals and other legal remedies were all exhausted. A month later, Clinton received a stay of execution, and in response, the family members of the Jacksons expressed their hope for Clinton to be put to death for the crime. Simultaneously, the U.S. Supreme Court rejected Clinton's follow-up appeal against his death sentence.

As of 2026, Clinton remains incarcerated on death row at the Ross Correctional Institution.

== See also ==
- Capital punishment in Ohio
- List of serial killers in the United States
- List of death row inmates in the United States § Ohio
