= Murder of Jersey Bridgeman =

2012 child murder in Bentonville, Arkansas, US

Jersey Bridgeman
- Jersey Dianne Bridgeman
- Born: Jersey Dianne Bridgeman; November 14, 2006; Bentonville, Arkansas, U.S.
- Died: November 20, 2012 (aged 6); Bentonville, Arkansas, U.S.
- Cause of death: Strangulation
- Body discovered: November 20, 2012
- Occupation: Student

Jersey Dianne Bridgeman was a 6-year-old girl who was abducted from her home while she was sleeping in Bentonville, Arkansas, on November 20, 2012, six days after her birthday. Later that day, Bridgeman was found murdered.

Her case garnered considerable media attention, which spurred debates about child protection in part due to the prior convictions and lengthy sentences for the perpetrators of aggravated child abuse against her, involving a high-profile trial, and the nature of the abuse and circumstances surrounding her subsequent abduction and murder.

== Early life and abuse case ==
Jersey Dianne Bridgeman (November 14, 2006 – November 20, 2012) was born and raised in the city of Bentonville, Arkansas. Following her parents’ divorce, her father and stepmother, David and Jana Bridgeman, began to chain her to a dresser in an apparent bid to stop her from wandering at night and, per their statements, getting into medication. The case generated profound public concern and outrage, leading to their incarceration after both pleaded guilty to false imprisonment, permitting abuse, and endangering the welfare of a minor, with David and Jana Bridgeman sentenced to 18 and 12 years in prison, respectively.

== Abduction and murder ==
Zachary Holly

Jersey was then placed in her mother DesaRae's custody and was frequently tended to by a neighbor, Zachary Holly (born October 8, 1984), and his wife, Amanda Holly, who served as babysitters. They tended to Jersey and her younger sister on the night of November 19, 2012, helping her mother to place the girls in bed after she arrived home late from work. The next morning, DesaRae reported that Jersey was missing, calling on the Hollys for help. Later that day, Jersey was found dead in a vacant home in the same neighborhood; her body was naked, and she had been raped and suffocated, apparently strangled by her pajama bottoms. Holly was questioned in the wake of Jersey's abduction and noted to be cooperative, including providing a sample of his DNA. However, forensic evidence was found to implicate him in the crime, and he was shortly thereafter arrested and arraigned for involvement in Jersey's abduction.

== Trial and aftermath ==
Prosecutors eventually charged Zachary on counts of kidnapping, sexual assault, murder, and residential burglary, to which he pleaded not guilty. Forensic evidence was considered convincing, and on May 20, 2015, the jury found Zachary guilty of the charges, with a sentence of death, as well as two life terms and 20 years. Zachary continued to assert his innocence and seek an overturning of his conviction, filing a Rule 37 petition in 2019 that he had received inadequate counsel from his attorneys.

Jersey's case continued to inspire substantial media coverage, not only due to the murder trial but also the circumstances leading up to her abduction and death, particularly in light of the persistent abuses on the part of those entrusted with her care, and with consideration of potential steps to improve child protection and anticipate possible dangers. Despite the abuse she endured, Jersey was noted to have been a happy and cheerful girl to those around her.

== See also ==
- List of death row inmates in the United States § Arkansas
- List of kidnappings
