= Cory Morris =

American serial killer, rapist, and necrophile

- Born: May 10, 1978 (age 48); Oklahoma City, Oklahoma, U.S.
- Other name: "The Crackhead Killer"
- Conviction: First degree murder (5 counts)
- Penalty: Death

Details
- Victims: 5+
- Span of crimes: September 2002 – April 2003
- Country: United States
- State: Arizona
- Date apprehended: April 12, 2003
- Imprisoned at: Florence State Prison

Cory Deonn Morris (born May 10, 1978), known as The Crackhead Killer, is an American serial killer and necrophile who killed at least five women at his trailer in Phoenix, Arizona, over a period of eight months from 2002 to 2003. Morris was convicted of the five murders and sentenced to death.

== Early life ==
Morris was born on May 10, 1978, in Oklahoma City, the first in a family of three children. As a teenager, he attended Douglass High School in Oklahoma City and, once in college, attended the Reserve Officers' Training Corps (ROTC) programs, aspiring to become a military officer. At age 22, he moved to Phoenix, Arizona, but with nowhere to live, he recommended his aunt Melva Willis bring his trailer behind their home. Subsequently, while in Phoenix, Morris picked a job up at a karaoke machine as a disc jockey in a local bar named Fat Cats, which local prostitutes and pimps visited frequently. Thanks to his friendly manner, Morris made friends with plenty of neighbors and coworkers, whom they subsequently nicknamed "Huggy Bear."

== Murders ==
As victims, Morris targeted female sex workers whom he arranged meetings with. Later, during his confessions, Morris claimed all the women had died either of a drug overdose, but abruptly changed all of the stories to claim he accidentally strangled them.

- Barbara Codman – September 2002

According to his confession, Morris claimed that in early September 2002, he exchanged with 46-year-old sex worker Barbara Codman, who agreed to have sex with Morris for $20. After the sex, Morris claimed he went outside to run nighttime work while Barbara stayed in the trailer to do drugs. Later, upon entering the trailer, Morris discovered Barbara unresponsive, attributing her death to an overdose. After some time, Morris reportedly changed the story to detectives and claimed he accidentally strangled her during sex.

- Shanteria Davis – October 2002

According to his confession, Morris said in October 2002, Shanteria Davis agreed to have sex in his trailer for $5. Upon the outcome of the sex, Morris left the trailer for some time before returning and finding Davis unconscious. He claimed he covered her body with a blanket before heading out, after which he returned home and disposed of her body in an alleyway not too far from his house. Upon hearing from homicide detectives how this explanation was impossible, Morris recanted his original confession. He asserted that during the night of the sex, Davis had requested Morris to choke her with her own hair, but upon doing that, he accidentally asphyxiated her and later disposed of her body in the alleyway.

- Jade Velazquez – February 2003

According to his confession, Morris claimed that Velazquez agreed to come to his camper for sex. Morris claimed they had sex and went to sleep. The next morning he realized Velazquez was dead, as she was unresponsive once he woke up. He later dumped her body off in the street. Like the other two victims, Morris recanted the first story and claimed what happened was he accidentally strangled her upon her request to choke her

- Sherry Noah – March 2003

According to his confession, Morris claimed that he had arranged a meeting with Noah. Upon having the sex, Morris left the trailer but returned after a while only to stumble upon Noah dead via an overdose. After the discovery, Morris said he strapped a belt around her neck, dragged her body outside, and dumped it next to his neighbor's house. After the results of an autopsy, this version of events was deemed impossible, after which homicide detectives confronted Morris. He recanted and claimed that Noah requested Morris to choke her, which ended in death.

- Julie Castillo – April 2003

According to his confession, Morris claims that in early April 2003, he stumbled upon a cold Julie Castillo walking around at night. Upon bringing her home, Castillo asked for some drugs, which he obliged. He left the trailer for a while, only to discover that she had overdosed. Upon learning this, however, Morris did nothing to alert law enforcement.

== Trial and imprisonment ==
In the months during the murders, friends of Morris noticed a body odor coming from him, which he brushed off from the heat from walking to work. On April 12, Morris' uncle was snooping though his trailer when he discovered the maggot ridden body of Julie Castillo under blankets in his trailer, after which he called the police. Upon this, Morris was arrested. In a subsequent autopsy, Castillo was found to have been dead for a couple of days before her discovery. The other victims were found near Morris' trailer; for such, he was questioned. He confessed but deflected responsibility away from him, saying that they all overdosed, but later changed the stories to the fact that he accidentally killed them. Due to evidence presented at trial, including his deflection away from responsibility, the jury found him guilty of five counts of murder, and sentenced him to death.

== See also ==
- List of death row inmates in the United States
- List of serial killers in the United States
