= Davie Waffle House murders =

2002 restaurant shooting and murder in Davie, Florida

- Location: Davie, Florida, United States
- Date: March 11, 2002
- Attack type: Murder; Robbery
- Deaths: Christina Delarosa; Willy Absolu
- Injuries: Barbara Nunn
- Verdict: Guilty
- Convictions: Hojan; First-degree murder (2 counts); Kidnapping (3 counts); Robbery (2 counts); Attempted murder Mickel; Kidnapping (3 counts); Robbery (2 counts)
- Sentence: Hojan; Death; Mickel; Life imprisonment
- Convicted: Gerhard Hojan; Jimmy Mickel

The Davie Waffle House murders occurred in Davie, Florida on March 11, 2002, when Jimmy Mickel and Gerhard Hojan barged into a local restaurant to commit armed robbery and held three employees hostage. Two of the employees, Christina Delarosa and Willy Absolu, were shot and killed during the hold-up, and a third, Barbara Nunn, survived despite a gunshot injury to her head.

The robbers were charged with multiple counts of murder, robbery and kidnapping. Mickel was sentenced to five consecutive life sentences for robbery and kidnapping after a jury acquitted him of murder, while Hojan was found guilty and sentenced to death for first-degree murder, kidnapping, robbery and attempted murder.

== Shootings ==
On the morning of March 11, 2002, in Davie, Florida, Gerhard Hojan and Jimmy Mickel went to the local Waffle House restaurant, where they ordered breakfast. At that time, Mickel and Hojan already had a plan to commit robbery. Mickel used to work at the restaurant and therefore knew the employees, while Hojan patronized the restaurant with Mickel several times in the past, and therefore also knew the workers. Three of them – 17-year-old Christina Delarosa, 18-year-old Willy Absolu, and 38-year-old Barbara Nunn – were present at the restaurant for their work shift at the time of the duo's arrival.

After eating breakfast, Mickel left the premises to retrieve bolt cutters, which he used to cut the locks to the cash stores in the employee section of the restaurant. As for Hojan, he brandished a gun to threaten all the three employees and ordered them to go inside the freezer. He would go in and out twice, one to check the victims to make sure they did not have their handphones, and another to take money from them. Hojan later went in the freezer for the third time, and ordered them to kneel and turn around, and despite the pleas for mercy, Hojan shot the three victims.

Nunn was shot once in the back of her head, but she survived her wound. However, the other two victims, Delarosa and Absolu, died from the shooting. Delarosa, who tried to hide under the food racks, was shot twice, once in the neck and another that pierced her spine. Absolu was fatally shot in the neck, and also sustained a gunshot wound in the arm, which was later deemed to be a defensive wound. Nunn was able to reach the gas station next door and asked for help, and she was later taken to hospital for treatment.

On the same day of the murders, Mickel was arrested by the authorities and charged with two counts of first-degree murder, as well as attempted murder and robbery. A day later, on March 12, 2002, Hojan was apprehended by the police and charged with attempted murder, attempted armed robbery and two counts of first-degree murder.

After the two men were charged with the killings, they were detained without bail while pending trial for the Waffle House shootings. In late September 2003, it was reported that the pair would stand trial earliest by October 2003.

== Trial of Gerhard Hojan ==
2026 death row mugshot of Hojan

On October 7, 2003, the first defendant, Gerhard Hojan, stood trial for the Davie Waffle House murders. The sole survivor, Barbara Nunn, came to court to testify and recount the robbery and murders at the Waffle House. The jury were also taken to visit the crime scene at one point during the proceedings.

On October 18, 2003, Hojan was found guilty of all nine criminal counts: two counts of first-degree murder, one count of attempted first-degree premeditated murder, one count of attempted first-degree felony murder, three counts of armed kidnapping, and two counts of armed robbery.

Hojan's sentencing trial took place a month later in November 2004. The prosecution sought the death penalty against Hojan over the brutality of the shootings, and on the defence's side, Hojan expressed that he wished to be executed and instructed his lawyers to not make submissions on sentence.

On November 24, 2003, the jury voted for Hojan to receive the death sentence based on a majority 9–3 vote.

On August 2, 2005, Hojan was sentenced to death by Circuit Judge Paul Backman, who cited that the victims had gone through "immeasurable fear and terror" at the hands of Hojan, and admonished him for the callousness he exhibited at the time of the murders. Hojan was also given five consecutive life sentences for the lesser counts.

== Trial of Jimmy Mickel ==
2026 prison mugshot of Mickel

Jimmy Mickel was the second perpetrator of the case to stand trial for the murders. During the trial in February 2004, the defence argued that Mickel was not aware of Hojan's plan to rob the Waffle House and he only helped Hojan to commit the robbery out of fear for his accomplice and roommate, although the prosecution argued that he played a principal role by plotting to commit the robbery that resulted in the murders, and under the felony murder rule of Florida, a person can be convicted of murder if he participates in a criminal act like robbery or kidnapping that led to the death of the victim(s), even if he did not directly kill them.

On February 13, 2004, Mickel was acquitted of the murder charges by the jury, but was convicted of the remaining charges: three counts of kidnapping and two counts of robbery. He faced the maximum penalty of life imprisonment for the lesser charges.

One month later, on March 30, 2004, Circuit Judge Paul Backman sentenced Mickel to five consecutive life sentences for kidnapping and robbery. He remarked in his sentencing verdict that Mickel was the one who solicited the robbery that led to the murders of both Delarosa and Absolu.

After the end of his trial, Mickel appealed against his conviction and sentence, but the Florida District Court of Appeal denied his appeal on June 7, 2006.

As of 2026, Mickel is serving his life sentence at the Everglades Correctional Institution.

== Hojan's appeals ==
=== First appeals ===
On February 27, 2009, Gerhard Hojan's first appeal against his death sentence was rejected by the Florida Supreme Court.

On September 3, 2015, the Florida Supreme Court dismissed the second appeal of Hojan against his conviction and sentence.

=== Re-sentencing trial ===
On February 1, 2017, Hojan was granted a re-sentencing trial because the jury voted for his death sentence by a split vote back in his original trial. At that time, Florida had changed its laws to allow the death penalty to be imposed solely based on unanimous jury votes. Given the fact that Hojan's sentence was imposed by a 9–3 majority vote, and his sentence was imposed after June 24, 2002, the date of a landmark U.S. Supreme Court ruling titled Ring v. Arizona, Hojan was eligible to be re-sentenced in a new hearing.

A year later, in September 2018, jury selection commenced for the re-sentencing trial of Hojan, who again faced the possibility of capital punishment. During the hearing, the prosecution once again argued for the death penalty on the basis that the murders were "especially cruel and heinous", and a medical examiner also testified about the nature of the injuries sustained by the victims, while the defence asked for life imprisonment for their client. Should one juror dissented in the vote for the death penalty, Hojan would be automatically sentenced to life in prison without the possibility of parole. Barbara Nunn, who survived the shootings 16 years earlier, returned to court to testify against Hojan during his re-sentencing trial.

On November 8, 2018, the 12-member jury unanimously voted to impose the death penalty on Hojan.

On December 18, 2018, Hojan was formally re-sentenced to death by Broward Circuit Judge Paul Backman. The judge ruled that the prosecution had proven beyond a reasonable doubt that the death penalty was appropriate for Hojan due to the aggravating factors of the case, particularly the part where Hojan still shot Delarosa despite her plea that she had a six-month-old son.

Five years after the re-sentencing of Hojan, in 2023, the state of Florida passed a new law to allow non-unanimous jury votes from eight or more jurors to impose death sentences, after infamous school shooter Nikolas Cruz escaped the death sentence for 17 murders of students and school staff members due to the jury failing to unanimously impose a death sentence.

=== Further appeals ===
On December 3, 2020, the Florida Supreme Court denied Hojan's appeal against his new death sentences.

As of 2026, Hojan remains incarcerated on death row at the Union Correctional Institution.

== See also ==
- Capital punishment in Florida
- List of death row inmates in the United States § Florida
