= Capital punishment in Guam =

Capital punishment was abolished in Guam in 1976.

When the area was ruled by Spain, capital crimes were punished by firing squad. After the island was acquired by the United States, condemned criminals were hanged. During the World War II Japanese occupation, the Kempeitai executed insurgents and resisters by various means. After the island was acquired by the United States, 14 Japanese war criminals were hanged by the United States Navy between 1947 and 1949. The United States Air Force also hanged two soldiers, 37-year-old Robert Wesley Burns and 25-year-old Herman Perry Dennis Jr., for the rape and premeditated murder of 27-year-old Women's Army Corps veteran and civilian employee Ruth Farnsworth in 1948. A third soldier, Calvin Dennis, had his sentence commuted to life in prison by President Dwight D. Eisenhower since his role in the murder was disputed.

Before 1966, first degree murder was a crime punishable by death. Gradually, death sentences were restricted over time in Guam, with the only capital crime during and after 1966 consisting of the murder of a peace officer. This list was expanded in 1970 to include those who killed the territorial governor, lieutenant governor, or a political candidate.

The Guam Legislature abolished capital punishment following an overhaul of Guam's statutes by the Guam Law Revision Commission. However, a person who commits a federal crime in Guam may receive the death penalty.

== See also ==
- Capital punishment in the United States
