= State Constables in South Carolina =

In South Carolina, a State Constable is a law enforcement officer who is either a uniformed or plainclothes law enforcement officer employed by one of the departments of the state government, a retired police officer, or a volunteer reserve police officer. Officers may be variously described as "State Constable", "Special State Constable", "Department of Public Safety (DPS) Special Constable" and "Magistrates' Constable". State Constables are appointed by the Governor of South Carolina, and regulated by the South Carolina Law Enforcement Division.

== History ==
Many types of law enforcement officers have been created with titles throughout history. One of the most common types is "constable" and multiple references in South Carolina state law describe various law enforcement officers having powers of constable with this authority originating from common law. Continual referencing by officials as to their authority and intent come from State Supreme Court rulings referenced throughout history in South Carolina with the following language, "...State Constables possess the authority of regularly commissioned peace officers, including powers of arrest." (State v. Luster, 1935), "Our Supreme Court has stated that constables perform all the duties of law enforcement officers and in particular 'a constable stands on the same footing as a sheriff.'" (State v. Franklin, 1908). State Law also specifies that SLED advises the Governor regarding State Constables related to approving candidates and specifies qualifications, training, conduct and has general oversight of the State Constable Program. Constableship in South Carolina consists of a wide range of laws and regulations with the intent to help provide an effective and efficient resource of law enforcement personnel for the citizens and agencies of South Carolina.

State Constables are appointed by the Governor of South Carolina (SC ST SEC 23-1-60) and overseen by the South Carolina State Law Enforcement Division (SLED). All State Constables are certified as a law enforcement officer by the South Carolina Law Enforcement Training Council, in compliance with the law SC ST 23-23-40 Certification Requirement. Since 1989 all State Constables were required to be certified. State Constables are employees of the State, including uncompensated/volunteer State Constables, as stated in SC ST 42-1-130. Additionally, they are provided insurance related to tort liability as specified in SC ST 1-11-140 and workers' compensation as specified in SC ST 23-1-60 and SC ST 42-1-130 while working in a law enforcement capacity.

State Constables are appointed officers and officially sworn peace officers authorized to enforce the Laws of the State with statewide jurisdiction.

As with Reserve Police Officers being "appointed officers" by county or municipal agencies and uncompensated volunteers, Group II and III State Constables are also "appointed officers" by the Governor after approval from SLED is granted and are also uncompensated volunteers. As with other States in the U.S., recognition of these auxiliary police officers designated in South Carolina as Group II and III State Constables and Reserve Police Officers as "law enforcement officers" provides for the necessary compliance with Federal and State Laws since they work on-duty for patrol and special events within areas currently designated as Gun Free Zones like schools and government buildings (except for Federal buildings and military bases where only Federal law enforcement officers have exclusive jurisdiction.) The South Carolina Attorney General has supported this recognition whereby auxiliary police officers are considered "law enforcement officers" and they comply with the laws related to possession of weapons (i.e. qualified service weapons only) in publicly owned buildings and schools and there is no requirement for them to be on-duty or in uniform to do so. This recognition is further supported throughout the Basic State Constable Training courses by the instructor along with multiple references within the Policies and Procedures published by SLED for Group III State Constables. The Commissioning of State Constables to enforce the Laws of the State with Regulation by SLED establishes compliance with Federal and State laws and regulations for them to serve as law enforcement officers.

When armed, State Constables have their credentials in their immediate possession for display if circumstances warrant. Any handguns they carry are concealed unless they are in a state approved uniform. Credentials are issued by SLED and contain approval signatures and a photograph. State Constables are required to comply with the Federal and State Laws governing actions of law enforcement officers.

== Groups ==
=== Group I ===
A South Carolina State Constable Group I can be a uniformed police officer or a plainclothes investigator for the state with statewide jurisdiction. Agencies that have a law enforcement division or services (e.g. SCDC investigators, SC Dept. of Mental Health Public Safety, SC Department of Revenue, USCPD, CUPD, SCDHEC, state colleges, state universities) are commissioned constables through SLED (State Law Enforcement Division).

=== Group II ===
Group II State Constables are retired police officers in good standing that can receive a State Constable Commission to continue to have authority and carry a weapon as set forth by SLED for Group III State Constables.

=== Group III ===
Group II and III State Constables serve the public and assist law enforcement agencies as a State reserve police force to help maintain public safety and officer safety for routine activities, special events, emergencies and fulfill needs for additional law enforcement personnel that arise during various circumstances.

==== Qualifications ====
Group III State Constables are evaluated by the South Carolina State Law Enforcement Division for meeting required qualifications. The candidate must submit an application to SLED for approval involving an evaluation to determine suitability to serve in a law enforcement capacity. This involves a review of personal and professional details, interviewing, a background check, medical evaluation, etc. If approved the candidate must complete the Basic State Constable training program unless existing law enforcement certification (e.g. Class 1) is current and accepted by SLED Regulatory. Candidates who are required to complete the Basic State Constable training program must acquire written authorization from SLED to attend and they must successfully demonstrate competency via certification testing prior to receiving a recommendation for a State Constable Commission. SLED generates a recommendation submitted to the Governor upon successful completion of all requirements, qualifications and certification test results. The State Constable Training Program is regulated by SLED and established by the SC Law Enforcement Training Council. Courses are presented by the South Carolina Criminal Justice Academy instructors and Certified Law Enforcement Instructors. The Basic Constable Training manual consists of 395 pages of law enforcement officer training material covered in approximately 92 hours of classroom instruction at a Technical College in the State. This also includes Firearms Training and Firearms Qualification Testing administered by a Certified Law Enforcement Firearms Training Instructor. Advanced Constable training requires an additional 272 pages of law enforcement training material covering additional topics in approximately 60 hours of classroom and physical training including practical examinations. Both manuals are generated by the SC Criminal Justice Academy and are approved by SLED. Basic Constable and Advanced Constable Certification testing are administered at the South Carolina Criminal Justice Academy.

==== Duties ====
Group III State Constables serve under the following conditions: 1. They can be assigned to work with agencies (e.g. Sheriff's Departments, Police Departments, University Police Departments, State agencies, Airport Police, etc.) for routine patrol, special events (e.g. festivals, fairs, school events, parades or other scheduled events of limited duration or emergency or critical incidents) and other law enforcement activities of the agency. They may also serve under other conditions as approved by the Chief of SLED. 2. They may take law enforcement actions while not working with an agency if encountering an imminent and urgent situation with either a threat to public safety or a need to preserve life. 3. They may take law enforcement action if an officer requests assistance or when assistance is not requested, but the need for assistance is obvious due to imminent and urgent danger of the circumstances.

Restrictions on Group III State Constables independently using their law enforcement authority (i.e. while not working with an agency) specify they may take law enforcement actions if encountering imminent and urgent circumstances when it is necessary to preserve life or protect public safety and they are required to notify the appropriate local law enforcement agency by the fastest means available as specified in the SLED policies and procedures. This detailed and restricted function identifies one of the most significant purposes of a State Constable in their service as intended.

== Training requirements ==
Annual firearms qualification and annual training consisting of additional law enforcement officer training including standardized legal updates via in-service training are required for all South Carolina State Constables and all activities are required to be conducted in accordance with the South Carolina Law Enforcement Training Council and policies established by SLED. Group II and Group III (uncompensated) State Constables are required by law to submit quarterly reports with the Governor (SC ST SEC 23-1-80) via SLED Regulatory of all work assignments, training and actions taken as a law enforcement officer.

== See also ==
- Constables in the United States
- Auxiliary police
