= List of Florida state prisons =

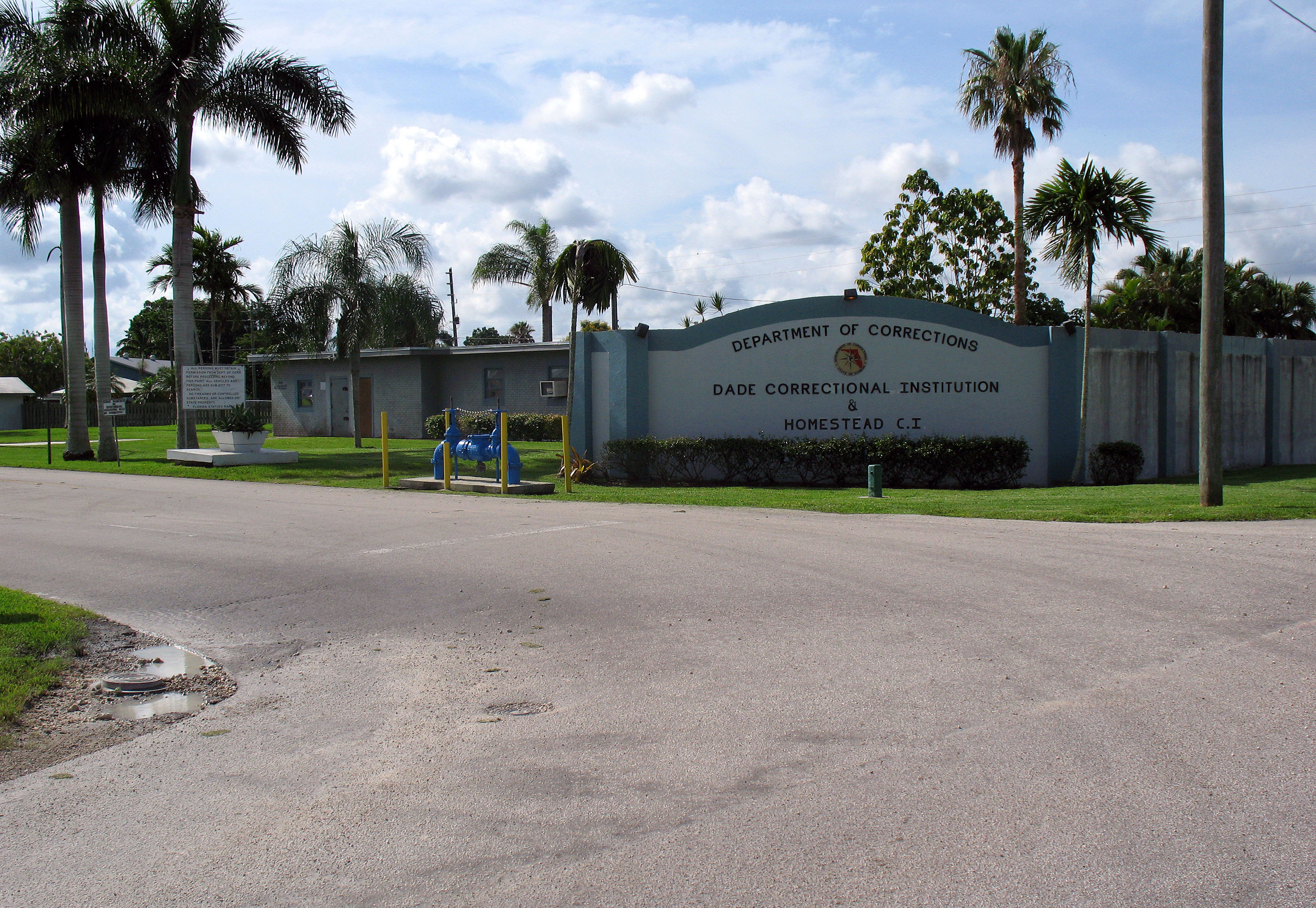
Dade Correctional Institution / Homestead Correctional Institution

The Florida Department of Corrections is divided into four regions, each representing a specific geographical area of the state. Region I is the panhandle area, Region II is the north-east and north-central areas, Region III consist of central Florida and Region IV which covers the southern portion of the peninsula.

There are several types of facilities in Florida, ranging from community work release centers to maximum security institutions.

The State of Florida operates almost all of its major institutions and most of its lesser facilities. Privately operated prisons in Florida are called "Correctional Facilities" (for example, Lake City Correctional Facility) while state operated facilities are called "Correctional Institutions" (e.g. Union Correctional Institution). Florida State Prison is the only facility in the state officially titled a "Prison".

== Facilities ==
Florida Prisons — green=state, red=federal (Hover mouse over pog to popup clickable link)

This is a list of major institutions and attached minor units in Florida as of August 2016, including all private prisons with state contracts. It does not include federal prisons or county jails located in the state of Florida.

- Apalachee Correctional Institution, East Unit (capacity 1322)
- Apalachee Correctional Institution, West Unit (operating capacity 819)
- Avon Park Correctional Institution (capacity 956)
- Baker Correctional Institution (capacity 1165)
- Calhoun Correctional Institution (capacity 1354)
- Central Florida Reception Center (capacity 1659)
- Central Florida Reception Center, East Unit (capacity 1407)
- Central Florida Reception Center, South Unit (capacity 150)
- Century Correctional Institution (capacity 1345)
- Charlotte Correctional Institution (capacity 1291)
- Columbia Correctional Institution (capacity 1427)
- Columbia Correctional Institution Annex (capacity 1566)
- Cross City Correctional Institution (capacity 1802)
- Cross City East Unit (capacity 432)
- Dade Correctional Institution (capacity 1521)
- Desoto Annex (capacity 1453)
- Everglades Correctional Institution (capacity 1788)
- Florida State Prison (capacity 1460)
- Florida State Prison, West Unit (capacity 802)
- Florida Women's Reception Center (women's facility) (capacity 1345)
- Franklin Correctional Institution' (capacity 1346)
- Gulf Correctional Institution (capacity 1568)
- Gulf Correctional Institution Annex (capacity 1398)
- Hamilton Correctional Institution (capacity 1177)
- Hamilton Correctional Institution Annex (capacity 1408)
- Hardee Correctional Institution (capacity 1541)
- Hernando Correctional Institution (capacity 467; women's facility)
- Holmes Correctional Institution (capacity 1185)
- Homestead Correctional Institution (capacity 668; women's facility)
- Jackson Correctional Institution (capacity 1346)
- Jefferson Correctional Institution (capacity 1179)
- Lake Correctional Institution (capacity 1093)
- Lancaster Correctional Institution (capacity 732)
- Lawtey Correctional Institution (capacity 832)
- Liberty Correctional Institution (capacity 1330)
- Lowell Correctional Institution (women's facility) (capacity 1456)
- Lowell Annex (women's facility) (capacity 1500)
- Madison Correctional Institution (capacity 1189)
- Marion Correctional Institution (capacity 1324)
- Martin Correctional Institution (capacity 1509)
- Mayo Correctional Institution Annex (capacity 1345)
- Northwest Florida Reception Center (capacity 1303)
- Northwest Florida Reception Center Annex (capacity 1415)
- Okaloosa Correctional Institution (capacity 894)
- Okeechobee Correctional Institution (capacity 1632)
- Polk Correctional Institution (capacity 1208)
- Putnam Correctional Institution (capacity 458)
- Quincy Annex (capacity 408)
- Reception and Medical Center (capacity 1503)
- Reception and Medical Center, West Unit (capacity 1148)
- Santa Rosa Correctional Institution (capacity 1614)
- Santa Rosa Correctional Institution Annex (capacity 1478)
- South Florida Reception Center (capacity 1315)
- South Florida Reception Center, South Unit (capacity 699)
- Sumter Correctional Institution (capacity 1639)
- Suwannee Correctional Institution (capacity 1505)
- Suwannee Correctional Institution Annex (capacity 1346)
- Taylor Correctional Institution (capacity 1301)
- Taylor Correctional Institution Annex (capacity 1409)
- Tomoka Correctional Institution (capacity 1263)
- Union Correctional Institution (capacity 2172)
- Wakulla Correctional Institution (capacity 1397)
- Wakulla Correctional Institution Annex (capacity 1532)
- Walton Correctional Institution (capacity 1201)
- Zephyrhills Correctional Institution (capacity 758)

=== Private ===
- Bay Correctional Facility (operated by MTC)
- Blackwater River Correctional Facility (GEO Group)
- Gadsden Correctional Facility (Management and Training Corporation; women's facility)
- Graceville Correctional Facility (MTC)
- Lake City Correctional Facility (Corrections Corporation of America)
- Moore Haven Correctional Facility (GEO Group)
- South Bay Correctional Facility (GEO Group)

=== Closed ===
- Demilly Correctional Institution
- Broward Correctional Institution
- Hillsborough Correctional Institution
- Gainesville Correctional Institution
- Glades Correctional Institution (closed 2011)
- Hendry County Correctional Institution
- Indian River Correctional Institution
- Mayo Correctional Institution (closed 2012)
