= Patrick Carlopoli and Tammy Modlin =

American murderers

Patrick S. Carlopoli
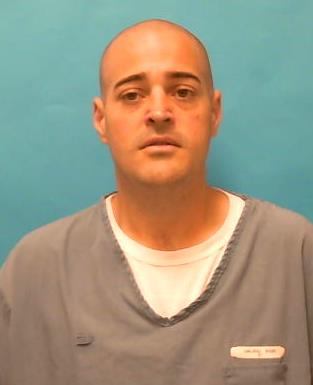
- Carlopoli's FDOC photo (c. 2022)
- Born: June 7, 1988 (age 38); Las Vegas, Nevada, U.S.
- Status: Incarcerated
- Motive: Murder-suicide pact
- Convictions: Second degree murder Conspiracy to commit first degree murder (2 counts); Aggravated child abuse (2 counts); Aggravated animal cruelty
- Penalty: 40 years imprisonment

Details
- Victims: Montana Modlin, 16 (as an accomplice); Jeanne Carlopoli, 3 (as an accomplice); Tammy Modlin, 43 (voluntarily killed)
- Date: January 24, 2016
- Country: United States
- State: Florida
- Weapons: Knife; Gun

Tammy Jo Modlin
- Born: Tammy Jo Lewis; March 28, 1972; Indianapolis, Indiana, U.S.
- Died: January 24, 2016 (aged 43); Fort Myers, Florida, U.S.
- Cause of death: Gunshot wounds
- Status: Deceased
- Motive: Murder-suicide pact
- Conviction: N/A
- Penalty: N/A

Details
- Victims: Montana Modlin, 16; Jeanne Carlopoli, 3
- Date: January 24, 2016
- Country: United States
- State: Florida
- Weapons: Knife; Gun

Patrick S. Carlopoli (born June 7, 1988) and Tammy Jo Modlin (March 28, 1972 – January 24, 2016) are an American couple who entered into a murder-suicide pact in Fort Myers, Florida. In 2016, Patrick and Tammy conspired to kill Tammy's children, one of whom was Patrick's daughter, then each other. However, following the murders, and after Tammy was voluntarily killed by Patrick, he found himself unable to follow through. Carlopoli instead called the police and was arrested. He later pleaded guilty and was sentenced to forty years in prison.

== Early lives ==
Carlopoli was from Las Vegas while Tammy, who was born Tammy Jo Lewis, was from Indianapolis. Tammy married a man named Mark Modlin, and they had a daughter together in 1999, who they named Montana. The two got divorced in the early 2000s.

Tammy graduated from Castle High School in 1990, and the University of Southern Indiana in 1996, with a degree in political science.

Carlopoli moved to Florida after having a falling-out with his family. He met Tammy, who was on disability checks while staying in a hotel at Orlando in 2010, and the two started dating. Carlopoli, who was attending college, started personally tutoring Montana Modlin in math. The couple moved to Fort Myers after Carlopoli got a school transfer. Carlopoli got a job as a waiter at an Outback Steakhouse restaurant to help pay for tuition. He had hoped to become a mechanical engineer.

Neither Carlopoli nor Tammy had histories of violence. Carlopoli had no criminal record and Tammy only had a 2015 citation for failing to pay a toll.

In 2012, Carlopoli and Tammy had a daughter together, who they named Jeanne Carlopoli. The couple could sometimes be heard fighting, occasionally loudly and viciously. Two neighbors said they heard the Carlopoli and Modlin family yelling and cursing at each other regularly. Although they sometimes saw the family on several occasions, including once at a cookout, they noted that even then, they didn't seem happy. The family had also lived in relative isolation.

One neighbor told reporters that they regretted not saying anything sooner. They said they often saw Jeanne staring out the window. "She looked like there was something wrong," she said. "She was always in the same pajamas, her hair was never combed. Looked dirty." She went on to say that she and other neighbors talked about calling someone to check on the family, but never did. "Maybe if we had, she would still be alive," said the neighbor.

== Murders and Carlopoli's guilty plea ==
According to Carlopoli, Tammy experienced paranoid delusions prior to the murders. Six days beforehand, Carlopoli was fired, and his friends reported he began acting different. Two days beforehand, Tammy posted a message on Facebook saying "I have suffered from depression my whole life. I have taken a Sam's bottle of Tylenol. Please wait for notification. I will refuse a hospital. It is my time. I love you. It is for the best. I want peace."

Carlopoli and Tammy conspired to kill the children, their dog, and themselves. On January 24, 2016, Carlopoli and Tammy fatally stabbed Milo, the family's Chihuahua-Jack Russell. Tammy then stabbed Jeanne, 3, and shot Montana, 16. She was then voluntarily shot and killed by Carlopoli. However, Carlopoli was unable to muster the willpower to kill himself. He instead dropped the gun, went outside, and called the police.

Carlopoli was arrested and confessed to the plot. He was charged with conspiracy to commit first degree murder in the deaths of Montana and Jeanne, second degree murder for killing Tammy, child abuse, and animal abuse. Tammy's father did not believe his daughter was a willing participant in the murder of her daughters and consented to her own death. "Everything was fine and she went down there to get a fresh start in life," he said. "The only thing is she was in the wrong place in the wrong time with the wrong person. I have known my daughter for 40 something years and I don't know a thing about him. What I would like to do is get inside of his head and find out what the hell happened."

However, medical evidence and the conspiracy to commit murder charges, in absence of murder charges, reflected that Tammy had been a willing participant. On November 30, 2016, Carlopoli pleaded guilty to all of the charges against him and was sentenced to 40 years in prison. He had faced a minimum of 32 years in prison, and the 40 years he received exceeded sentencing guidelines, which called for leniency due to his lack of a criminal history.

Carlopoli is currently serving his sentence at the Central Florida Reception Center, and is scheduled for release on April 15, 2054.
