= Apalachee (disambiguation) =

Apalachee may refer to:

== People ==
- Apalachee people, historical tribe from the Florida Panhandle

== Places ==
- Apalachee, Georgia, an unincorporated community
- Apalachee Bay, a bay of the Gulf of Mexico
- Apalachee Correctional Institution, East Unit, a state prison for men located in Sneads, Florida
- Apalachee High School, near Winder, Georgia
  - 2024 Apalachee High School shooting, a mass shooting at the school
- Apalachee Province, an area of what is now the Florida Panhandle historically inhabited by the Apalachee
- Apalachee River (Alabama), a river in the U.S. state of Alabama
- Apalachee River (Georgia), a river in the U.S. state of Georgia

== Other ==
- Apalachee (horse), a thoroughbred racehorse
- Apalachee language, an extinct Muskogean language
- Talimali Band of Apalachee Indians, a nonprofit organization in Louisiana
