= Dwight Eaglin =

American serial killer and former professional boxer (born 1975)

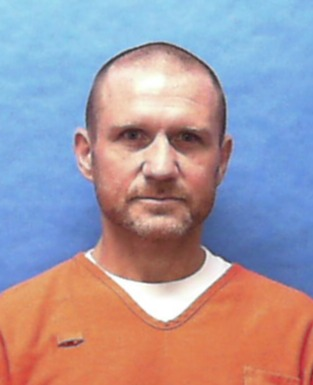
- Born: Dwight Thomas Eaglin; December 23, 1975 (age 50); Clearwater, Florida, U.S.
- Other names: Tommy Eaglin; The Fighting Irishman
- Occupation: Boxer
- Years active: 1994 – 1998
- Status: Incarcerated
- Conviction: First-degree murder (x3) (Note: Out of all these convictions, one was for a murder committed in 1998, while the remaining two were committed in 2003.)
- Penalty: 2001; Life without parole; 2006; Death

Details
- Victims: 3
- Date: 1998 – 2003
- Location: Florida
- Date apprehended: March 7, 1998
- Imprisoned at: Charlotte Correctional Institution (former); Union Correctional Institution (current)
- Boxing career
- Stance: Orthodox

Boxing record
- Total fights: 22
- Wins: 17
- Win by KO: 10
- Losses: 5

Dwight Thomas Eaglin (born December 23, 1975) is an American serial killer convicted of three murders in Florida between 1998 and 2003. Eaglin, a former professional boxer, was first charged in 1998 for the first-degree murder of John Frederick Nichols, and he was convicted and given a life sentence in 2001. However, two years later, in 2003, Eaglin and two other prisoners attempted to escape from prison, and during the attempt, Eaglin killed two more people: corrections officer Darla Kay Lathrem and inmate Charles Fuston. For the double murder, Eaglin was found guilty of first-degree murder and sentenced to death on both counts.

== Early life ==
Dwight Eaglin was born on December 23, 1975, in Clearwater, Florida, and grew up in Illinois, but his childhood was dysfunctional overall. Eaglin's father was abusive, and he once broke his son's leg in order to teach his other siblings a lesson, while Eaglin's mother abandoned him at an early age. Eaglin was subsequently placed under foster care, and according to his foster father, despite this troubled upbringing, Eaglin remained relatively a good-natured child until he went astray in high school upon falling in with the "wrong crowd". By 2006, Eaglin's father ended up in an Illinois state prison for an unknown offence, while one of Eaglin's half-brothers was incarcerated at a federal prison in Illinois for an unspecified offence as well.

After reaching adulthood, in 1993, Eaglin left Illinois and relocated to St. Petersburg, Florida, where a local boxing club trainer took him under his wing, and Eaglin thus started out his career as an amateur boxer, earning a state championship title in amateur boxing in 1994, before he transitioned to professional boxing, and went on to become the titleholder of Florida's welterweight champion by early 1998. Throughout his boxing career, Eaglin, who went by the alias Tommy Eaglin, became known as "The Fighting Irishman" and was noted to have a promising future in professional sports prior to his arrest in 1998 for a murder case.

== Murder of John Frederick Nichols ==
On the night of February 27, 1998, in Pinellas County, Florida, Dwight Eaglin, then 22 years old, stole a car from outside a nightclub lounge and drove it to a parking lot of a topless bar, where he attempted to remove a stereo from the vehicle. While he was doing it, Eaglin was caught red-handed by John Frederick Nichols, who happened to drive his truck into the parking lot after ending his shift at a fast food restaurant, and Nichols suspected Eaglin of stealing the vehicle after initially agreeing to help Eaglin find the stereo. When Nichols confronted Eaglin and attempted to leave to call the police, Eaglin pulled out a knife to stab Nichols 13 times, killing the 27-year-old restaurant shift supervisor as a result.

Nichols's body was found behind the bar by the police, and according to an autopsy report, Nichols sustained several knife wounds on the chest, as well as one to the neck and another that went through his spine. At the time of his death, Nichols was an Army veteran who served during the Gulf War and had a lawn care and pressure wash business, and he completed his studies at St. Petersburg Junior College (where he studied to be a lab technician). Upon a tip-off to the police, Eaglin was arrested as a suspect on March 7, 1998, and he was charged with the first-degree murder of Nichols, as well as grand theft of a motor vehicle.

On January 10, 2001, the jury found Eaglin guilty of first-degree murder. On that same day, Circuit Judge Brandt Downey sentenced Eaglin to life imprisonment without the possibility of parole.

== 2003 prison murders ==
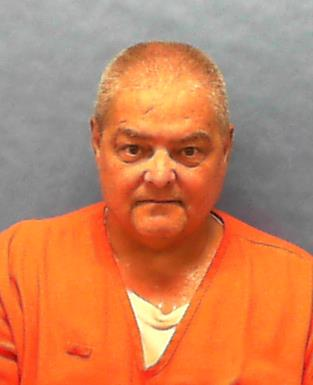
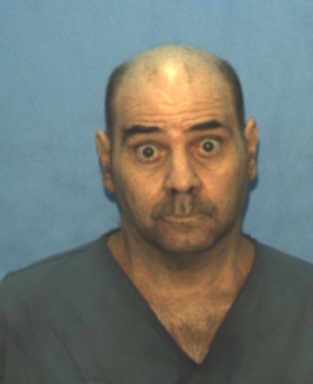
- left: Stephen Vincent Smith, who was one of Eaglin's two accomplices
- right: Michael Jones, who was one of Eaglin's two accomplices

After his sentencing, Dwight Eaglin was transferred to the Charlotte Correctional Institution, where he began serving his life sentence. However, two years later, on June 11, 2003, Eaglin would commit two more murders behind bars.

Prior to the double murder, Eaglin and another two prisoners, Stephen Vincent Smith (January 31, 1961 – September 25, 2021) and Michael Jones (September 16, 1956 – July 25, 2008), planned to escape from prison while they participated in the renovation of the prison's inmate dormitories, and as part of their plan, they even constructed an escape ladder and a metal tool to hook for the prison's outer lights. A month before the plan was carried out, the ladder was destroyed by one of the inmates, Charles Fuston, and the trio had to repair the ladder, which made Eaglin develop hatred against Fuston and wanted to get back at him.

At that time, Smith was serving life in prison for the March 1990 robbery-murder of 75-year-old Blanche Costello with a screwdriver, while Jones was serving a life term for rape since 1988.

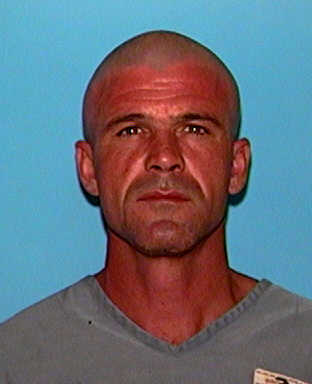
Charles Fuston, who was one of two people killed during Eaglin's escape attempt.

On the day of the murders, the trio, along with Fuston and a fifth member named John Beaston, were engaging in their final day of the prison's renovation works, while 38-year-old corrections officer Darla Kay Lathrem was supervising them. The trio first initiated their plot by duping Lathrem into opening a locked mop closet, before Eaglin used a sledgehammer to bludgeon Lathrem several times in the head, murdering her before they stuffed her body inside the closet.

Apart from Lathrem, Fuston and Beaston were also attacked and assaulted by the trio, and during the assault, Fuston tried to protect Lathrem from the trio's beatings. The two prisoners were found with injuries in prison cells by other correction officers in the immediate aftermath of the assault. After the attack, the trio attempted to escape, but ultimately, their attempt was unsuccessful and they were arrested. Jones and Smith were both caught inside the dormitory, while Eaglin himself was caught trying to climb the ladder out of the prison fence. Both Beaston and Fuston were later rushed to Lee Memorial Hospital for treatment, but the latter died at the age of 36 due to fatal head wounds a day after the incident. Beaston survived his injuries and was reported to be in fair condition.

At the time of his death, Fuston was serving a 30-year sentence for charges of aggravated battery with a weapon and burglary since 1993, and due to his actions of trying to protect Lathrem, Fuston was remembered as a hero by many who attended his funeral. Reports showed that during his imprisonment, Fuston strived to change for the better by committing himself to religion and completing his high school diploma in prison, and also helped other inmates prior to his death. Lathrem, who was the first female corrections officer to be murdered in the line of duty, was buried at the Fort Myers Memorial Gardens after a funeral on June 17, 2003, which was attended by hundreds of law enforcement officers and correction officers.

=== Aftermath ===
After the foiled escape attempt and murders, an internal investigation was conducted into the killings of Fuston and Lathrem. A report in January 2004 concluded that multiple safety measures were not followed in this case, such as allowing a lone rookie officer to supervise the inmates alone, ignoring the rules on keeping certain tools and the failure to conduct the necessary security checks. As a result of the incident, three correction officers (one assistant warden, one captain and one lieutenant) working at the prison were being demoted to sergeants and transferred to work at other prisons. The prison's warden, Warren Cornell, resigned from his post about a week after the murders.

In June 2005, Lathrem's father filed a wrongful-death lawsuit against the Florida Department of Corrections and sought damages of more than $15,000, hoping that this and the death of his daughter could ensure safer working conditions for all correction officers at large in the future. In January 2007, the state of Florida agreed to settle on the lawsuit by paying almost $200,000 to the bereaved family of Lathrem, even though it did not acknowledge the claims of negligence.

== Death penalty trial ==
=== Charges ===
After their arrests, Dwight Eaglin, Stephen Smith and Michael Jones were all charged with murder. On December 4, 2003, a Charlotte County grand jury formally indicted the trio for the first-degree murders of Darla Lathrem and Charles Fuston, and State Attorney Stephen Russell expressed that he was "seriously considering" whether to pursue the death penalty against all three suspects for the double murder.

On January 14, 2004, a motion was filed by Smith to request for separate trials in his case and those of Eaglin and Jones. By April 2004, the trio were confirmed to be tried separately, and their trial dates were tentatively scheduled to take place in early 2005.

On January 29, 2004, the prosecution announced that they would seek the death penalty against all the three prisoners.

In August 2005, the trial dates of Eaglin and his two co-defendants were delayed until 2006, and Eaglin's trial was rescheduled to begin in January 2006.

=== Trial ===
Eaglin's first day of trial was originally scheduled for January 9, 2006, but the trial was delayed until February 20, 2006, in order to provide more time for the defense to analyze a new DNA report. Eaglin's trial eventually began as scheduled on February 20, 2006.

During the trial, several witnesses, including correction officers and inmates, were summoned to testify about the escape attempt and murders. One of them, a prisoner named Kenneth Lykins, testified that he overheard the escape plan and Eaglin's statement that he would kill anyone who tried to stop them. Another inmate, Jessie Baker, testified that Eaglin was furious at Fuston for destroying the trio's makeshift ladder and his intention to take revenge on Fuston for what he did.

Forensic expert Leroy Parker testified that the blood splatters found on Eaglin's prison pants showed that Eaglin was standing right beside one of the victims during the sledgehammer attack, and that the very low position where the splatters were found showed that the victims were likely on the ground while being assaulted. Furthermore, Dr. Riazul H. Imami, the forensic pathologist who performed an autopsy on the victims, testified that based on his post-mortem findings, Lathrem was being taken by surprise and never knew she was on the verge of being attacked when Eaglin hammered her to her head, and she died from the first of three fatal blows to her head, and there were no defensive wounds on her hands or forearms. In combination, both Fuston and Lathrem suffered at least seven lethal strikes to their heads.

On February 24, 2006, the jury found Eaglin guilty of both counts of first-degree murder.

On February 27, 2006, the jury recommended the death penalty for Eaglin by a majority vote of 8–4 for both the murders of Fuston and Lathrem.

On March 31, 2006, Circuit Judge William Blackwell formally sentenced Eaglin to death for the double murder. During sentencing, Blackwell remarked that Eaglin did not show remorse for his actions and reports revealed that Eaglin smiled in court before and after the death sentence was meted out.

=== Convictions of Smith and Jones ===
Smith

On June 24, 2006, Smith was convicted of the first-degree murder of Lathrem, although the prosecution dismissed the other charge of murder for Fuston's killing. The prosecution earlier argued that Smith was the ringleader who planned the murder, which made him as guilty as Eaglin, even though it was Eaglin who used the sledgehammer on the victims.

On July 1, 2006, the jury, by a majority vote of 9–3, decided to impose the death penalty for Smith on both murder counts. A month later, on August 18, 2006, Smith was formally sentenced to death by Circuit Judge William Blackwell, who took into account the various aggravating factors, such as the planning behind the murders, the killing of a law enforcement officer in the line of duty, and his criminal history.

In September 2008 and September 2013 respectively, Smith's death sentence was twice upheld by the Florida Supreme Court in spite of his appeals. About 18 years after the double murder, Smith died of unknown causes on September 25, 2021, while on death row awaiting a new sentencing hearing.

Jones

Michael Jones was the third and final perpetrator to be convicted. Unlike both Smith and Eaglin, Jones reached a plea bargain with the prosecution, agreeing to plead guilty to the murder of Lathrem in exchange for the death penalty to be taken off the table, which would allow Jones to spend the rest of his life in prison. Additionally, the second murder charge was also dismissed as part of the plea agreement. Jones was arraigned in court to plead guilty on August 18, 2006, but the plea deal was placed on hold due to the trial judge ordering Jones to receive a third psychiatric evaluation.

In October 2006, Jones was found mentally competent to stand trial. On January 21, 2007, Jones, who was 50 years old at this point, was sentenced to life without parole after he pleaded guilty to the first-degree murder of Lathrem. As a result of this additional life sentence, Jones was no longer eligible for parole under his first life term.

Jones died in prison on July 25, 2008, one year and six months after he was sentenced for murdering Lathrem.

== Appeals and death row ==
On June 4, 2009, Dwight Eaglin's direct appeal against his death sentence was dismissed by the Florida Supreme Court.

On June 25, 2015, the Florida Supreme Court dismissed Eaglin's appeal, in which the defence argued for Eaglin's death sentence and conviction to be overturned due to ineffective trial counsel, claims which the court rejected.

In 2016, the state of Florida changed its laws to allow the imposition of death sentences through only unanimous jury decisions. The reform paved way for the re-sentencing of death row inmates whose death sentences were imposed by non-unanimous jury verdicts in Florida. Since Eaglin's death sentence was not unanimously decided by the jury back then in his original trial, he was eligible for re-sentencing, and a motion hearing was scheduled between 2024 and 2025. The new law, however, was only in effect for about six to seven years, before Florida Governor Ron DeSantis signed a new death penalty law in 2023 to allow death sentences be imposed by a majority vote of eight or more jurors.

Eaglin was granted a re-sentencing trial in April 2025. The re-sentencing trial was scheduled on January 6, 2026, but it was postponed a week later. While pending to be re-sentenced, Eaglin remained incarcerated at the Florida State Prison due to his life sentence for the 1998 St. Petersburg strip club murder case.

On January 22, 2026, the jury recommended the death penalty for Eaglin on both counts of first-degree murder. According to the 20th Judicial Circuit State's Attorney Office, the jury was unanimous in electing the death sentence for the murder of Fuston, while it was a majority vote of 11–1 in favour of death for the murder of Lathrem.

On June 19, 2026, Eaglin was formally re-sentenced to death for the murders of Lathrem and Fuston.

As of 2026, Eaglin remains incarcerated at the Union Correctional Institution.

== See also ==
- Capital punishment in Florida
- List of death row inmates in the United States § Florida
- List of serial killers in the United States
