= Henyard =

Henyard is a surname. Notable people with the surname include:

- Richard Henyard (1974–2008), American murderer
- Tiffany Henyard (born 1983), American politician
