= Murder of Sally Ivester =

1976 torture and murder of a woman in Miami-Dade County, Florida

- Sally Ivester
- Location: North Miami Beach, Florida, United States
- Date: March 30, 1976; 50 years ago
- Attack type: Murder, torture, sexual assault
- Weapons: Chain belt, nightstick, chair leg, cigarettes
- Deaths: Sally Ivester
- Motive: Anger over receiving money lesser than the promised sum
- Verdict: Guilty
- Convictions: Thompson: First-degree murder; Surace: First-degree murder, reduced to second-degree murder
- Sentence: Thompson: Death; Surace: Death, commuted to life imprisonment
- Convicted: Rocco James Surace; William Lee Thompson

On March 30, 1976, 23-year-old Georgia resident Sally Ivester was murdered in a motel in North Miami Beach, Florida, by William Lee Thompson (born February 19, 1952) and Rocco James Surace (1944 or 1954 – November 14, 1993). (Note: The exact year of Surace's birth was unspecified, because some sources reported Surace's age as 21 in 1976, while some reported his age as 31. Surace's inmate profile was unavailable in the Florida Department of Corrections.) The two men demanded that Ivester obtain money from her family. After she gave them $25 — far less than the promised sum of $200 to $300 — they tortured her and killed her. The murder was witnessed by a woman who was being held in the same room as Ivester.

Thompson and Surace were arrested, charged with, and convicted of first-degree murder, and both were sentenced to death. Surace appealed his conviction and was granted a new trial, at which he was convicted of second-degree murder and sentenced to life in prison. He died in prison in 1993.

Thompson’s death sentence was overturned twice before being reinstated after resentencing trials in 1978 and 1989, respectively. He remains on death row as of 2026.

== Murder ==
On March 30, 1976, two young women, Sally Ivester and Barbara Savage, were with two men inside a motel room in North Miami Beach, Florida. The men, William Lee Thompson and Rocco James Surace, demanded the girls to call home and get some money to pay them. Although Savage got the amount of money she offered to pay to the men, Ivester only got $25, which fell short of the $200 to $300 she promised to pay. This incurred the anger of both men.

In a fit of rage, Surace removed his chain belt and began beating Ivester. Thompson joined in the assault and used the belt to further beat and torture Ivester. Ivester was sexually assaulted by the pair, who used a chair leg to penetrate Ivester's vagina, which caused tearing to the inner vagina wall and internal bleeding. The men repeated the process of beating with other objects such as a night stick. The pair forced the victim to eat her sanitary napkin and lick spilled beer off the floor, and they burned her with lit cigarettes and lighters.

Halfway through the brutal assault, Ivester was taken to a phone booth by Thompson, who instructed her to call her mother and ask for more money. During the phone call, Ivester's mother noticed that her daughter's voice sounded strange, as if it carried a "death rattle". Before ending her call, Ivester told her mother, "I'm all right. I'm all right. I'm going to be all right." Afterwards, both Thompson and Surace continued beating and torturing Ivester, who died of multiple injuries and internal bleeding. Throughout the whole process, Savage witnessed her friend being beaten and killed by the two men, but she did not intervene due to her fear that the men would do the same to her if she tried to escape the motel room.

== Trial ==
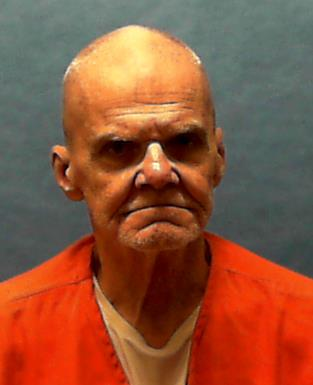
FDOC mugshot of Thompson

On April 2, 1976, after their arrests, both Rocco Surace and William Thompson were charged with the first-degree murder. In May 1976, both Surace and Thompson were ruled mentally competent to stand trial for the murder of Ivester.

The men were scheduled to stand trial on June 14, 1976, and the day before their trial date, the pair's request for separate trials was rejected by Judge Joseph Durant. The trial proceeded as scheduled, and during the process, the jury was presented with the horrific details of Ivester's murder, and one of the jurors even fainted in court as a result. The police also described it as the "meanest murder" of Miami-Dade County.

On June 15, 1976, Surace pleaded guilty to charges of kidnapping, rape and first-degree murder on the second day of the trial. A day later, Thompson pleaded guilty to the charges of first-degree murder, kidnapping and rape.

On June 23, 1976, the jury recommended the death penalty for Surace and Thompson.

On June 25, 1976, Circuit Judge Joseph Durant sentenced the pair to death by electrocution for the murder of Ivester.

== Re-trial and death of Surace ==
On June 24, 1977, the Florida Supreme Court unanimously ordered a re-trial for Rocco Surace and granted his request to overturn his guilty plea. During the re-trial itself, William Thompson came to court as a witness to testify, and he claimed responsibility as the primary offender of the case.

On September 14, 1978, after more than ten hours of deliberation, the jury found Surace guilty of a lesser charge of second-degree murder.

On November 11, 1978, Surace was sentenced to life imprisonment, equivalent to 203 years, by Judge John A. Tanksley, who cited the severity of the offense and remarked that he would have sentenced Surace to the electric chair without hesitation if the jury had convicted him of first-degree murder as originally charged.

Surace remained in prison until he died of unknown causes on November 14, 1993.

== Thompson's appeals and re-sentencing ==
=== First re-sentencing ===
On June 24, 1977, upon his appeal, Thompson's conviction was overturned by the Florida Supreme Court and he was granted a re-trial.

On September 18, 1978, Thompson pleaded guilty a second time to the first-degree murder of Sally Ivester. Two days later, on September 20, 1978, the jury again voted to sentence Thompson to death, and on that same day, Judge John A. Tanksley followed the jury's verdict, sentencing Thompson to death a second time.

=== Second appeal process and second re-sentencing ===
On July 3, 1980, the Florida Supreme Court voted 6–1 to dismiss Thompson's appeal against his death sentence.

On February 5, 1982, Governor Bob Graham signed a death warrant for Thompson, scheduling him to be executed on February 26, 1982. A week after receiving his death warrant, Thompson's appeal against his death sentence was rejected on February 12, 1982. On February 26, 1982, before his scheduled execution, a West Palm Beach judge granted Thompson a stay of execution.

On April 10, 1986, the 11th Circuit Court of Appeals turned down Thompson's appeal against his death sentence and murder conviction.

On May 13, 1987, Governor Bob Martinez signed death warrants for Thompson and another inmate, Kenneth Hardwick, scheduling them to be executed on July 23, 1987. On July 2, 1987, the Florida Supreme Court stayed Thompson's execution a second time.

On September 9, 1987, the Florida Supreme Court overturned Thompson's death sentence a second time and ordered him to be re-sentenced, because the judge had not considered mitigating factors that could have helped him avoid the death penalty. While Thompson was awaiting re-sentencing, Ivester's family spoke to the media on October 30, 1988, stating that they wanted a conclusion to the case, and wondered why the proceedings were still ongoing even after many years since the crime. Ivester's mother stated Thompson should have died a long time ago for killing her daughter.

On June 6, 1989, the jury once again recommended the death penalty based on a majority vote of 7–5. On August 25, 1989, Thompson was sentenced to death a third time by Judge S. Peter Capua.

=== Further appeals ===
On April 1, 1993, the Florida Supreme Court upheld Thompson's death sentence and denied his appeal.

On April 13, 2000, the Florida Supreme Court unanimously denied Thompson's appeal and his 54 claims for post-conviction relief.

On March 9, 2009, the U.S. Supreme Court, by a majority decision, rejected Thompson's appeal, in which he argued that his potential execution after a 32-year stay or longer on death row violated the Eighth Amendment's ban on cruel and unusual punishment. Two of the dissenting justices, Stephen Breyer and John Paul Stevens, argued that such a prolonged period on death row, particularly in light of the harsh conditions associated with death-row confinement, could itself constitute cruel and unusual punishment under the Eighth Amendment. Justice Clarence Thomas, however, strongly rejected both the dissenting justices' reasoning and Thompson's claims. He emphasized that the cruelty at issue was embodied in Thompson's crime itself, rather than in the length of his confinement on death row or the capital punishment imposed upon him. In particular, Justice Thomas detailed the brutal and callous circumstances surrounding the homicide to underscore the severity of Thompson's offense.

On June 4, 2016, Thompson filed an appeal to the Florida Supreme Court for a re-sentencing hearing and to argue that he should be ineligible to be executed due to an intellectual disability.

On November 10, 2016, the Florida Supreme Court granted Thompson a hearing to argue his intellectual disability claims in state court, which could potentially prevent him from being executed.

On April 1, 2022, by a 6–1 vote, the Florida Supreme Court dismissed Thompson's appeal to litigate his intellectual disability claims in the lower courts, which he sought to prove to exclude himself from the death sentence.

== Death row ==
As of 2026, Thompson remains on death row at the Union Correctional Institution.

In September 1981, during his third year on death row, Thompson attempted suicide inside his cell at Florida State Prison. Thompson was found by guards with a home-made knife stuck inside his stomach, and he was taken for emergency treatment at the prison clinic. Thompson survived the attempt. A suicide note was found, but authorities did not release its contents.

In March 2024, reports highlighted a notable trend on Florida's death row: many condemned inmates had outlived the judges who sentenced these convicts to death. Thompson was one of them: Miami-Dade Judge John Tanksley, the judge who sentenced Thompson to death in 1978, died in 2002 at the age of 76.

By December 2025, there were 17 Miami-Dade County convicts incarcerated on Florida’s death row, and Thompson was one of them. Additionally, Thompson had been the longest-serving Miami prisoner on Florida's death row since June 2016.

As of July 31, 2026, Thompson was one of 21 inmates held on Florida's death row for 40 years or more. He stayed on death row for 47 years and 10 months.

On September 11, 2026, Florida Governor Ron DeSantis signed a death warrant for Thompson, whose sentence was scheduled to be carried out on October 13, 2026.

Shortly after Thompson's death warrant was authorized, his lawyers filed an appeal seeking to delay his death sentence, submitting claims that Thompson was diagnosed with dementia and a review was required to determine if he was mentally competent to be executed. On September 17, 2026, Governor DeSantis issued a temporary stay of execution and appointed three psychiatrists to review Thompson's condition, and if he was found mentally competent to be executed, his execution would proceed as scheduled on October 13, 2026.

On September 23, 2026, Thompson appealed to the Miami-Dade Circuit Court Judge Zachary James and asked for a stay of execution in order to conduct an evidentiary hearing to assess his mental competency to be executed.

On October 1, 2026, Governor Ron DeSantis signed the death warrant for James Robertson, whose execution was scheduled for October 13, 2026—the same date as Thompson’s. Robertson was convicted of the 2008 murder of fellow inmate Frank Hart at Charlotte Correctional Institution. If psychiatrists determined that Thompson was competent to be executed and his execution proceeded alongside Robertson’s, who had waived his appeals, it would have marked Florida’s second double execution in less than three months. On October 8, 2026, DeSantis canceled Thompson's scheduled execution, although the reasons were not made public. Robertson was put to death as scheduled on October 13, 2026.

== See also ==
- Capital punishment in Florida
- List of death row inmates in the United States § Florida
