= Relationships for incarcerated individuals =

Familial and romantic relations of individuals in prisons or jails

Relationships of incarcerated individuals are the familial and romantic relations of individuals in prisons or jails. Although the population of incarcerated men and women is considered quite high in many countries, there is relatively little research on the effects of incarceration on the inmates' social worlds. However, it has been demonstrated that inmate relationships play a significant role in their well-being both during and after incarceration, making such research important in improving their overall health, and lowering rates of recidivism.

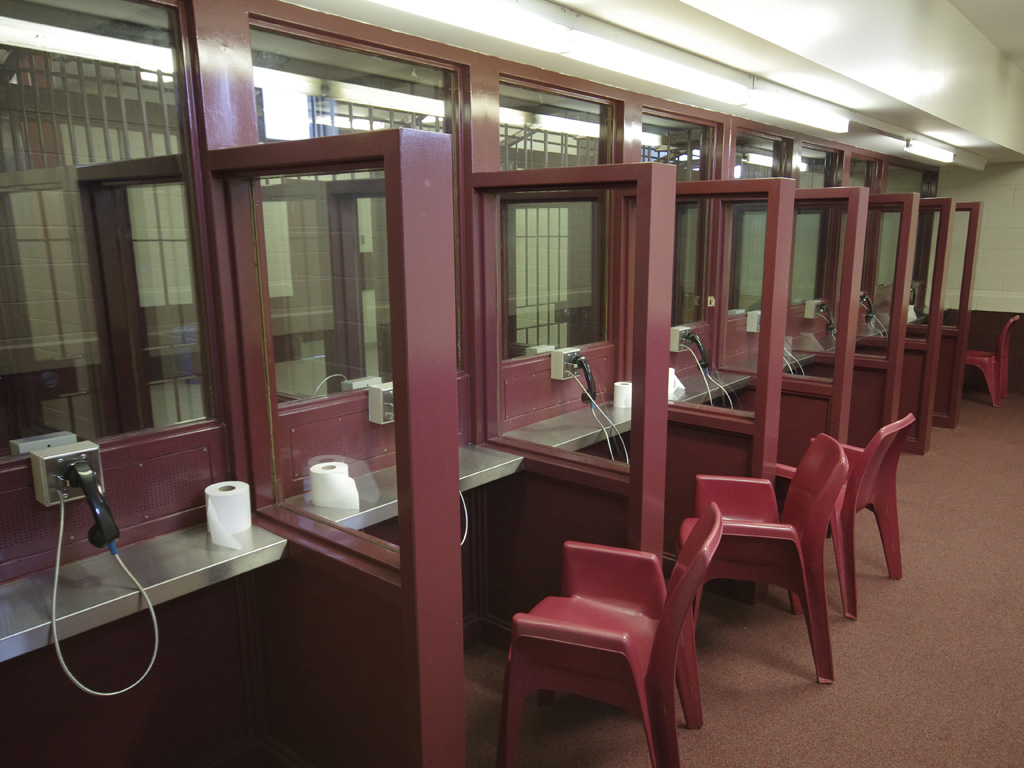
Kingston Pen Visiting

== Non-romantic social support ==
To ameliorate life in prison, inmates will often utilize different methods of social support. Some of the more salient options for inmates are to form surrogate families, participate in religious activities, and enroll in educational programs.

=== Surrogate families ===
To combat the negative side effects of incarceration, such as loneliness and seclusion, many inmates seek out surrogate families for support. Inmates emulate familial units by taking on different roles, such as father, mother, daughter, son, etc. Titles are given to those who participate in the family. These titles ascribe meanings to indicate either homosexual relationships (e.g., husband and wife) or platonic but caring relationships (e.g., mother and daughter). These temporary familial formations are more prevalent in female prisons than their male counterparts. However, some argue that male prison gangs fulfill a similar role.

Overall, surrogate families can offer a wide range of social support for inmates, such as aiding in conflict resolution, and protection, and providing feelings of belongingness. Further, these surrogate families may be one of the few methods female inmates utilize to garner social support since women are more likely than men to serve sentences in prisons that are far from their loved ones. However, some research suggests that these surrogate families can often create more anger and frustration for inmates than seeking support through other avenues (e.g., vocational, educational, or religious). Furthermore, newer inmates are more likely to seek out these formations than long-term inmates, suggesting that these formations have beneficial short-term outcomes but become a hindrance as time passes.

=== Religion while incarcerated ===
Religious services in the prison environment have a long-standing history. Penitentiaries were first established in the United States by religious leaders who sought to rehabilitate lawbreakers by repenting for their sins. Since that time, religion has developed with the prison systems to become one of the most prevalent and available forms of rehabilitation and programming offered to inmates. Overall, this availability is often utilized by the prison population. For example, during a one-year period in 2004, 50% of male inmates and 85% of female inmates attended at least one religious service or activity. Time spent utilizing religious opportunities and studies has more positive associations with inmates’ mental health and behavior than their nonreligious counterparts, demonstrated by higher scores on self-reports of self-satisfaction and confidence as well as lower rule violations. Possible reasons may be that spending time away from prison cells in the prison chapel offers inmates time to bond with like-minded individuals and to find acceptance and support. Religion also provides prisoners with a sense of security and helps prisoners choose prosocial behaviors over violent or maladaptive strategies. Finally, religious services in the prison setting offer an environment that restricts criminal or antisocial behavior, thus allowing inmates a rare chance to feel safe and welcomed.

=== Education while incarcerated ===
Many prisons offer educational programs, such as vocational skill building, literacy programs, GED certifications, and college courses. These programs offer inmates a chance to improve their self-confidence, break up prison life monotony, improve their quality of life, and decrease chances of reoffending once back in civilian life. This prosocial support, much like religion, has been associated with better prison behavior (i.e., fewer rule violations) and better mental health. Further, once enrolled in educational programs, prisoners report a change in attitude towards life, improved self-esteem, confidence, and self-awareness and felt that without these programs, their anger, frustration, and aggression would increase. However, some research posits that prison-level support systems, such as education programs, provide more social support and thus more prosocial benefits for women than men. This could be because women are relationship-oriented and women's prison environment is less based on coercive power structures.

== Intimate partner relationships ==
Romantic relationships, sexual or otherwise, heavily influence the experiences and psychological health of incarcerated individuals. Varying forms of intimate-partner relationships (IPRs) both with fellow inmates and non-incarcerated individuals may furnish support and/or additional stressors for the incarcerated person. Topics to consider regarding IPRs of incarcerated individuals include: types of relationships, barriers to IPRs (relationship development and intimacy maintenance), positive and negative outcomes of IPRs, and the sexual practices therein.

=== One incarcerated partner IPRs ===
The most prevalent research on the topic on intimate-partner relationships pertains to heterosexual romantic relationships with one incarcerated partner. Due to recent judicial rulings in the United States, homosexual married couples in the United States receive equivalent spousal privileges as heterosexual married couples regarding criminal trials and testifying. These rights are reflected regarding contact with spouses while incarcerated (e.g. conjugal visits). That being said, California, Connecticut, New York, and Washington are the only four states that allow conjugal visits. Therefore, IPRs with one incarcerated partner will be referred to as such regardless of the sexual orientation of the couple.

==== Benefits ====
Prison-specific research indicates that both male and female inmates who maintain strong family ties, including romantic partners, are better able to cope while in prison, have fewer disciplinary problems while incarcerated, and are less likely to recidivate after release from prison. For example, inmates who reported having a happy marriage experienced more successful transitions back to their community at end of their sentence than those who described marriages with high levels of conflict. In the interest of preventing recidivism, programs aimed at developing IPRs and increasing intimacy are gaining momentum to reduce the strain on inmates’ and their partners’ relationships. These programs, such as PREP: Marriage Education for Inmates, attempt to provide couples with strengthening and coping skills, such as making the most of time spent together.

==== Barriers ====
Separation of romantic partners due to incarceration leads to unique stressors on IPRs. Much of this strain is due to limited and inadequate settings for face to face contact with the inmates’ significant other. However, it is not only the physical separation of incarceration that puts stress on couples. The unique hardships of incarceration faced by one partner and the forced independence within the general community faced by the other can create a psychological distance between them as well. The combination of both physical and psychological distance can place enormous strain on an inmate's external IPR. This strain is furthered by the stigma associated with incarceration, which limits sources of social support from the couples’ community.

==== Divorce ====
Thus it may be unsurprising that many IPRs are terminated while one partner is incarcerated. The salient determinant of divorce is physical separation from a spouse. This is especially pertinent to situations wherein physical contact is limited by distance or difficulties with the facility's visitation procedures. Among visitors to prisons, there is widespread dissatisfaction, regardless of age or ethnicity, with regulations pertinent to visiting their significant others, such as dress inspection. Visitors also expressed explicit anger over the visitation procedures that they considered to be demeaning, illogical, or unpredictably enforced. Examples of this include visitors whose attire is deemed inappropriate must change their clothing or forfeit their visit for that day and policing for any “hint” of sexual suggestion. Correctional officers confirm that these criteria are not consistently enforced.

Given the difficulty in visitation, and restricted contact with their partners, it is perhaps expected that many couples face the issue of infidelity while one is incarcerated. The ability to remain faithful to an incarcerated individual is often correlated to the length of the sentence; the longer the sentence, the more likely that infidelity will occur. Further, despite expressions of loyalty, several romantic partners of incarcerated individuals confirmed that they maintain connections with potential partners in case their current relationships fail. When asked to report their perspectives on cheating, many incarcerated individuals reported that they could empathize with an unfaithful significant other if the actions occurred during their separation. However, many also stated that they would prefer not to know if infidelity had occurred.

=== Barriers to future IPRs ===
Consequences of incarceration on IPRs also exist for individuals who enter prison without a preexisting relationship, as well as those who exit following IPR dissolution. Previous inmates are placed at a significant disadvantage for assuming mainstream social roles upon reentry into the community, particularly romantic relationships. Separation from the community, stigma associated with time in prison, and fewer employment opportunities decrease the likelihood that ex-inmates will marry. Thus, incarceration has a lasting impact on one's ability to engage in, and maintain, IPRs.

=== Benefits of heterosexual IPRs ===
Prisoners may also engage in IPRs with fellow offenders during their incarceration. While most prisons are homogeneous in the sex of their inmates, there are some facilities that house both men and women; within such institutions there are cases where heterosexual married couples are held in the same location. This situation is globally rare, but drawing attention due to the benefits it provides inmates. For instance, inmates in these relationships experience a lower level of romantic loneliness, a higher level of sexual satisfaction, as well as increased quality of life compared to inmates in external IPRs or inmates with no partner. This suggests that inmates in the same prison will benefit from developing IPRs with other inmates. In the rare instances where inmates are permitted contact with incarcerated members of the opposite sex, non-marriage IPRs are shown to be beneficial for the inmates’ interpersonal and psychological state.

=== Characteristics of homosexual IPRs ===
The final form of IPR to consider is a same-sex relationship between inmates in a gender specific facility. Previous research has demonstrated differences between the manifestations of homosexual IPRs in male and female prison settings. Such differences include relationship characteristics where women were found to create more stable interpersonal relationships and engage in fewer forced or coerced sexual interactions compared to incarcerated men. However, there has been more recent evidence to suggestion that homosexual IPRs in women's facilities are beginning to look more like those prototypically represented in male facilities.

It is not atypical to become involved in homosexual relationships, see LGBT people in prison, while in prison. Most instances of IPRs between incarcerated individuals are identified as consensual sexual activity as opposed to genuine romantic love. In fact, women in prison report that sincere romantic attachment between inmates is the exception rather than the norm. According to inmate self-report, the benefits of consensual sexual relationships are primarily economic in nature. For example, one may engage in such a relationship for the exchange of resources, such as commissary goods and money, or due to loneliness (deprivation of heterosexual intercourse). The description of these relationships closely reflects what has been reported to typically occur in men's prisons, see Situational sexual behavior. For example, incarcerated males endorsed that those who participate in consensual sexual contact often do so due to the deprivation of heterosexual intercourse or in exchange for favors (e.g. status and protection).

== Incarcerated individuals as parents ==
Incarceration often has major effects on individuals’ relationships with their family members, and the impact that incarceration has on these relationships is seminal in understanding the well being of these individuals as well as their family members. This impact is especially salient in the parent-child dynamic that is created when a mother or father is introduced to the justice system. This dynamic is become more and more pervasive, given the large and growing numbers of parents currently incarcerated.

=== Growing numbers ===
Mass incarceration is the practice of imprisoning an excessively large number of people. This practice has been done in particular to people of color especially in low income areas. African Americans and people of color have historically faced a disproportionate high level of incarceration rates in comparison with their white counterparts. According to the Bureau of Justice Statistics (2010), "An estimated 809,800 prisoners of the 1,518,525 held in the nation’s prisons at midyear 2007 were parents of minor children…accounting for 2.3% of the U.S. resident population under 18 (p 1)." In fact, in 2007, half of all incarcerated individuals were parents. This number has grown exponentially since 1991, with the number of incarcerated men who endorsed being fathers increasing by 76%, and the number of mothers increasing by 122%.

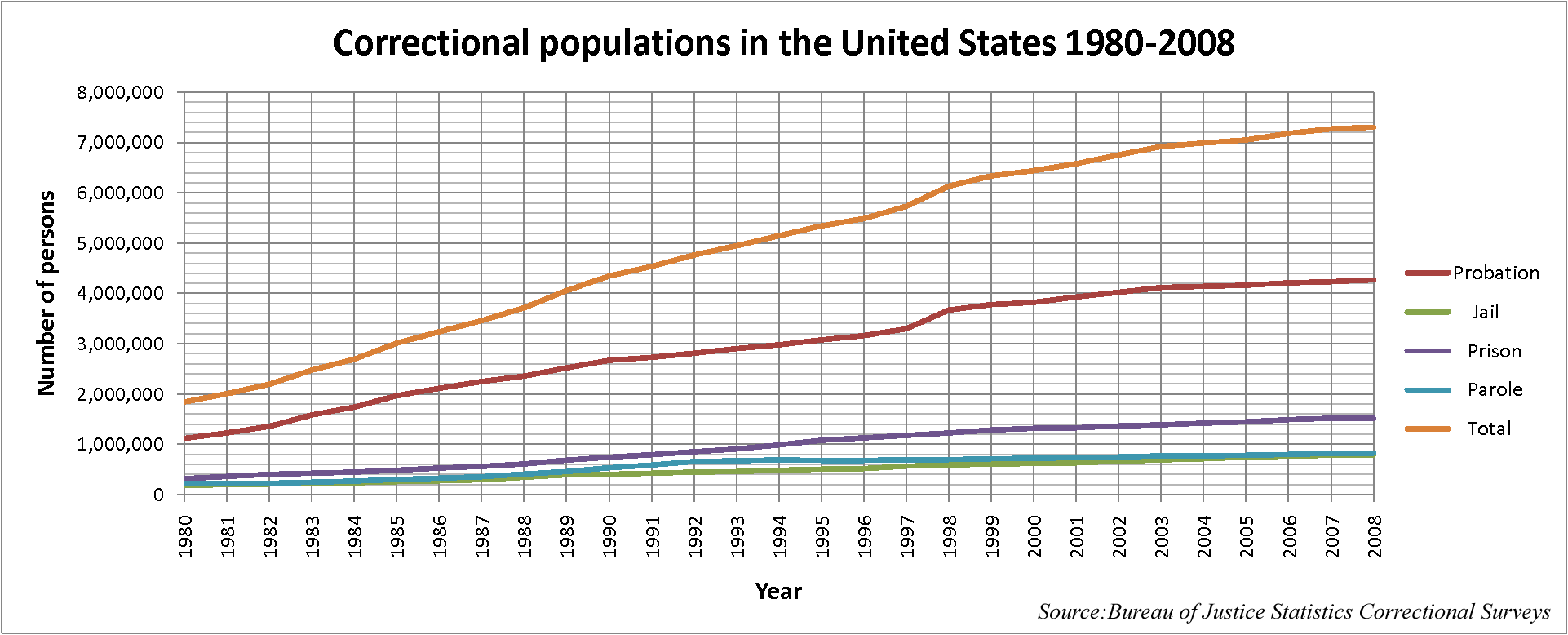
Correctional Populations in the United States 1980-2008

=== Children of incarcerated parents ===
In 2020 of all prison inmates 33 percent were Black and 23 percent were Latino (Barkan, 2020). In alignment with the disparities among the groups of people facing incarceration, children who are Black or Latino are also impacted by mass incarceration at a disproportionate rate. Vulnerable groups of children are more likely to have a parent who is incarcerated further increasing the amount of inequalities these children will face. There are stark racial disparities among the rates of children who have an incarcerated parent. The number of children with incarcerated parents has increased over the past 25 years. 1 in every 28 children (3.6 percent) has a parent incarcerated, two-thirds of these parents are incarcerated for non-violent offenses. Although there are many children who feel as though they have experienced loss due to their parents being in prison, there are more instances where black and Latino children are forced to live with the consequences of their parent's actions. Compared to the 1 in 110 white children who have at least one parent incarcerated, 1 in 15 black children and 1 in 41 Hispanic children have a parent who is incarcerated. The mental effects children of incarcerated parents are comparable to that of children who have lost their parent due to death or divorce. These children are more likely to experience an increased risk for mental health problems compared to other children their age. The mental health problems are connected to the social stigma that they encounter when their parents are arrested, or when their peers find out that of their parent's incarceration. Because of this fear that children will experience mental disparities, some parents and caregivers hide their incarceration from the children by telling them that the parent is on vacation or that they went away to college. These lies foster an overwhelming amount of stress and confusion on the child once they find out the truth. Age and gender is another factor that influences how children cope and react to their parent being incarcerated. Young children tend to develop mental and emotional trauma. Children between the ages of 2 and 6 are prone to feelings of separation anxiety, traumatic stress, and survivor's guilt. Early adolescents may grow up and be unable to cope with future trauma, they develop poor concepts of themselves, and when faced with minor stress that might be unable to cope. As children get around the ages of 11-14 their reaction to their parent's incarceration starts to reflect in their behavior. Males are more likely to express aggression and acts of delinquency, while females tend to internalize their emotions by acts of seeking attention. As these children become adults from the ages of 15-18, they prematurely take on the dependency, and tend to disconnect from their parents. This will lead to acts of criminal behavior and ultimately a cycle of incarceration.

Programs have been set in place in an effort to help mitigate the setbacks that the children of incarcerated parents face.The Living Interactive Family Education Program helps to reduce children from feeling abandoned by their parents through education and interactive activities with parents and their children. Another very valuable resource that helps children who have an incarcerated parent is the free breakfast and lunch program that many public schools offer. Children who have an incarcerated parent are most likely living in poverty. Children who are able to communicate with their parents are less likely to experience psychological and behavioral problems. Through having contact with their parents, they are able to have a better understanding of their parent's situation, and are less likely to commit crime that will land them in the same situation. Although having a relationship with incarcerated parents are important for the child, it is also understood that this can have an adverse impact on the child. Children who are in contact with their parents will experience an emotional roller coaster. At times children are angry at the fact that they could not be with their parents, causing them to act out or become emotionally withdrawn. Parent contact gives children a sense of hope in reuniting with their parents. This contact also allows for an smoother transition back into the child's life once the parent is released.

=== Demographic group of children more affected by incarcerated parents ===
Although there are a large number of children with incarcerated parents, there is an unequal number of incarcerated parents for certain demographic groups. Children of color are disproportionately affected by mass incarceration. Children of color are more likely than their white counterparts to have a parent in jail. More specifically, while only 4% of white children experience a parent being incarcerated before their 14th birthday, 25% of African American children would have faced a parent being incarcerated before their 14th birthday. So not only do developing adolescents have to go through a parent being put in jail, but a larger percentage of African American children have to experience this when compared to white children. Education is a very integral aspect to the development of children. However, when basic needs are not being met first and children are sent to school from homes where their needs are not being met they are less likely to succeed. This would also translate to the effects of parental incarceration (described in section "Children of incarcerated parents) being more apparent in primarily African American neighborhoods. This disparity is even more apparent when looking at the race percentages amongst parents in prison. It was found that in state prisons, 47% of the parent population are African American, 19% are Hispanic, and 29% are white/non-Hispanic. In federal prisons, it was found that 49% of parents were African American, 30% were Hispanic, and 22% were white/non-Hispanic. Again, it is seen that children of color are more likely to have experiences with a parent being incarcerated.

=== Parent-child contact ===
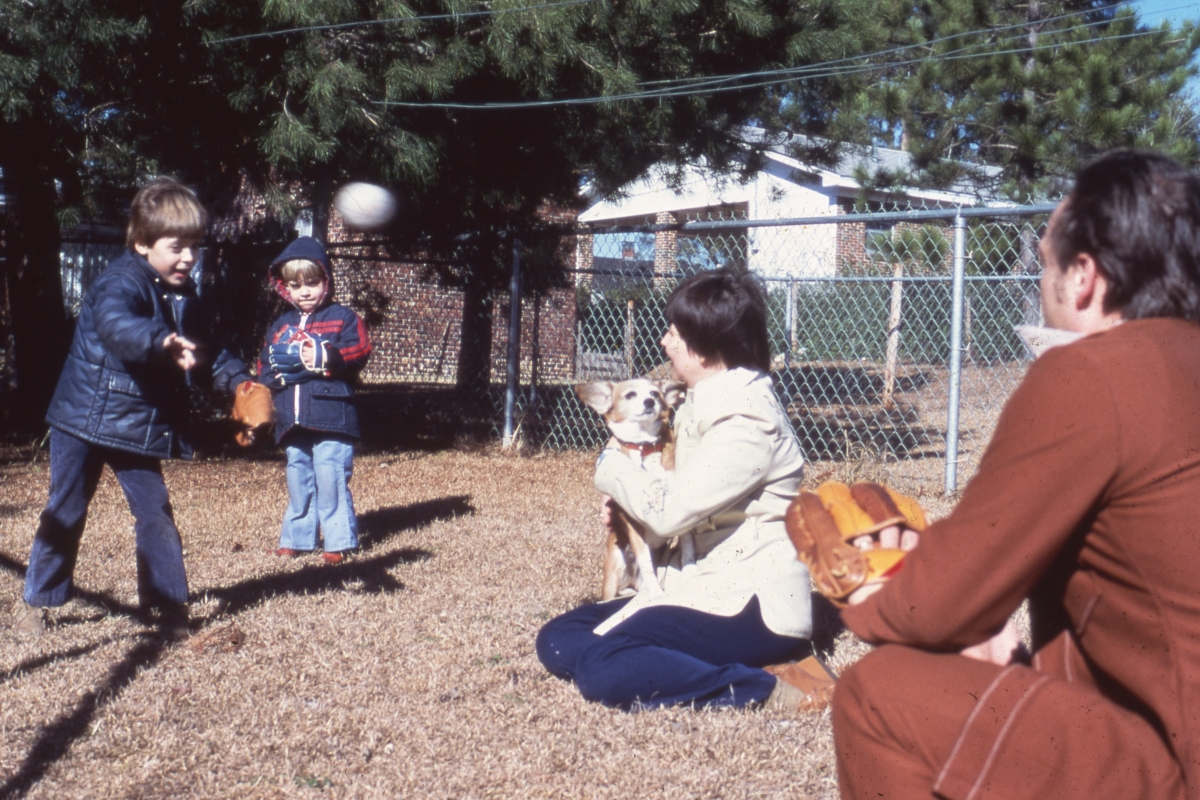
An inmate playing catch with his sons during visitation at the Apalachee Correctional Institution, East Unit in the United States c. 1975

Incarceration of mothers, leading to single motherhood, has lasting effects on family structures and mother wellbeing. Not only are there large and growing numbers of parents in prison or jail, the effects of incarceration on their familial relationships have associations with strong negative outcomes. For example, many women who are incarcerated endorse being single mothers, and are often labeled as inadequate providers for their children during and after their time in prison or jail. In fact, 52% of incarcerated mothers report living in a single-parent household compared to 19% of incarcerated fathers. Unlike many male inmates, whose children are likely to remain in the care of their wives or girlfriends, incarcerated females are at very high risk of losing their children to the State. The separation and lack of contact with their children that these women endorse has been described as damaging to their mental health. Studies on mothers post-release have underscored this conceptualization by demonstrating that healthy mother-child relationships have positive impacts on depression symptoms and self-esteem. In other words, healthy relationships with their children appear to improve women's emotional health during and after their time involved in the justice system.

Further, as time goes on incarcerated parents are less likely to have contact with their children. A nationwide study in 2004 demonstrated that "more than half of parents housed in a state correctional facility had never had a personal visit from their child(ren), and almost half of parents in a federal facility had experienced the same (p. 7)." The lack of contact is likely due in part to parents often being housed far from their places of residence. In fact, in 2004, only 15% of parents in state facilities and 5% of parents in federal facilities were incarcerated within a 50-mile radius of the homes at the times of their arrest. Contrast these numbers with the 62% of parents housed in a state correctional facility, and 84% of parents living in federal correctional facilities who endorsed living more than 100 miles from their homes at the time of their arrest. Such distances indicate that incarcerated parents often live too far from home to see their children on a regular basis.

Some protective factors have been identified to increase inmate's well-being while separated from their children. Such factors include forms of remote contact, such as phone calls or written letters. Studies have shown that remote contact can serve as a practical alternative to visitation in reducing parental stress, and distress in regard to mothers’ feelings of capability as a parent. Further, Clarke et al. (2005) demonstrated that fathers in prison endorsed remote contact, over visitation, as ideal contact with their children because such contact offers an opportunity to show commitment to their relationship in a controlled manner. Therefore, remote contact may offer incarcerated parents an avenue to demonstrate their parental competency and commitment in a controlled manner without the hindrance of proximity.

Some public libraries have started programs that provide opportunities for incarcerated parents to foster the parent-child relationship. For example, the Arapahoe Library District in Colorado works alongside the Arapahoe County Detention Center to connect incarcerated parents with their children through books. The "Begin with Books" program "provides incarcerated parents with a children's book that the library will mail to the child," along with a note and an optional video of the parent reading the book aloud for their child.

=== Parent Child Contact Programs ===
To mitigate the impacts of having a parent being incarcerated, various programs have been implemented to help promote parent and child contact between incarcerated parents and their children. Some of these programs include:

1. Living Interactive Family Education (LIFE) Program. This program aims to reduce feelings of abandonment, anger, and sadness, of children with incarcerated parents in order to help prevent mental and behavioral disorders that often arise in kids with incarcerated parents. This program is directly aimed at fostering and maintaining relationships between incarcerated fathers and their children. During the program running hours, fathers and their kids participate in four hours of activities based on youth and family development curricula. This program also provides monthly parenting classes for participating fathers.
2. Parenting Program at Nebraska Correctional Center for Women. This program includes a nursery program that allows incarcerated mothers to keep their babies close to them and raise them for up to when the babies reach 18 months of age. There is also child development courses for mothers and overnight and day child visitations are offered.
3. Reading Family Ties: Face to Face. This program has two locations in Florida. In this program mothers are taken to a room with video cameras and computers where they can videocall their kids and read a story to them. Kids are provided free transportation to reading sites.
4. Mothers/Men Inside Loving Kids (M.I.L.K.) Program. This program included classes, for both fathers and mothers, on child development, parent education, and independent living skills classes. The program includes transportation and food for visits between child and parent which can sometimes last up to 4-6 days.

=== Financial impact ===
The financial burden of being a parent behind bars also perpetuates high amounts of stress that can affect overall well being. For example, incarcerated mothers who endorse being the primary caretaker of their children often receive limited resources from their social network outside of the prison or jail. A woman's social network is typically engendered with the costly responsibility of raising her children during her sentence, meaning that she receives far less financial support than other women who do not seek childcare from their social system.

Further, families under financial stress before a parent's incarceration are likely to experience increased difficulty in staying in contact with the individual. In a 2008 study of incarcerated mothers, results demonstrated that women who were at risk due to young age, unemployment, being a single parent, and low education were less likely than other inmates to have their children visit during their prison sentence. This difficulty is likely due to the high cost of contact with incarcerated individuals. For example, a study done in 2006 found that families in certain areas of the Bronx were spending 15% of their incomes each month in order to stay in touch with incarcerated family members.

This financial burden is exacerbated by the fact that there is reduced opportunity for employment after incarceration for both men and women. The reduced ability of parents to receive legitimate income means that the family has less access to essential resources. Such predicaments increase parents vulnerability to become involved in drugs, prostitution, and theft for income, thus encouraging the cyclical nature of incarceration and further disruption of the family system.

Though some relationships have protective factors that buffer against re-entry into the criminal justice system, others contribute to the propensity to re-offend. Relationships among families, peers, communities, and romantic partners all contribute in a unique way to predict how successfully an individual reintegrates into society.

== Relationships and reoffending ==
Though some relationships have protective factors that buffer against re-entry into the criminal justice system, others contribute to the propensity to re-offend. Relationships among families, peers, communities, and romantic partners all contribute in a unique way to predict how successfully an individual reintegrates into society.

=== Social context upon release ===
Upon release, the communities that offenders find themselves in can impact the success of reentry. It is often the case that offenders are released into areas that are socially isolated and low in resources. These disadvantaged neighborhoods are shown to be a risk factor for recidivism. The result is an inability to use social networks in order to integrate into new communities and use social relationships to advance employment opportunities. Furthermore, researchers have theorized that placement of offenders in disadvantaged neighborhoods where members of the community have weak attachments to their jobs likely exposes newly released prisoners to social circumstances that are conducive to criminal activity. It has further been theorized that disadvantaged neighborhoods to which offenders are released are often low in informal control, resulting in less informal sanction for deviant behaviour, which can open the pathway for re-offending. Social disorganization further provides a poor “normative environment “ (p. 170), as there is a presence of conflicting information of moral standards. When prisoners are released into their pre-incarceration environment, there exists the potential to re-initiate contact with negatively social influences, possibly leading towards re-offending.

=== Social costs as deterrents ===
Many have proposed that the need for social contact is essential to human well-being and functioning. Offenders who enter the prison system are forced to re-arrange their social connections with fellow inmates and correctional staff. Specifically, when first-time offenders experience the negative social impacts of incarceration, these experiences serve to deter individuals from reoffending and have been identified as the social costs of imprisonment. Common experiences that result in the pain of social costs during incarceration include deprivation of social contact with the outside world (e.g. family and friends), loss of autonomy, and negative social interactions within the confounds of incarceration (i.e. physical violence). Research on first-time offenders indicates that the most costly social pain experienced within these populations is the deprivation of contact with persons outside the prison facility, highlighting the importance of positive social associations outside of prison walls as deterrents of recidivism.

=== Visitation ===
Visitations by significant social contacts (e.g. family members, peers) can serve as reminders of positive associations with the outside world. Social constraints, isolation, and traumas experienced while incarcerated may contribute to risks in recidivism, and visitation by significant persons are, to some degree, effective in protecting against these factors. Research indicates that visitation from significant others and spouses are most effective in reducing recidivism, followed by visits from friends and non-spousal family members. However, findings indicate that after 3 to 4 visits, the positive effects of visitation on recidivism decreases. This can potentially be attributed to the reduction in pain from social costs due to lack of social deprivation. Visitation during incarceration assists in maintaining social ties, which are essential to the availability of social support, social networking to acquire resources, and in turn successful reentry upon release from prison.

=== Marriage and family ===
The role of marriage has been investigated in relation to recidivism. Research indicates that early marriages (age at marriage) that are cohesive in nature can be protective against recidivism. Individuals who engage in less recidivistic behaviour are also less likely to be divorced or separated, or to have engaged in impulsive decision-making to marry. These findings indicate that while marriage alone is not a protective factor against re-offending, marriages with strong foundations and entered with consideration have to potential to reduce recidivism. The association between healthy marriages and reduced recidivism has initiated marriage and relationship skills educational programs for incarcerated population to prepare them for reintegration, such as The Oklahoma Marriage Initiative.

Similarly, community-based family strengthening models have been implemented in order to promote connectedness among family members so as to better support relatives who might be at risk to re-offend. As research has indicated family connectedness to be an important factor in psychological well-being and positive outcomes, emphasis on imparting knowledge about the experience of incarcerated family members is of high importance in order to maintain high levels of social support within the family system. Results from these programs indicate that a focus on connectedness within families was associated with gains in relationship skills, as well as recidivism, demonstrating the importance of familial support and understanding in desistance.

== See also ==
- African-American family structure#Black male incarceration and mortality
