= James Winkles =

American murderer and suspected serial killer

- Born: James Delano Winkles; December 18, 1940; Oakman, Alabama, U.S.
- Died: September 9, 2010 (aged 69); Union Correctional Institution, Raiford, Florida, U.S.
- Convictions: First degree murder ×2 (2003); Kidnapping; Robbery (1982); Grand theft Firearm theft Forgery (1982)
- Penalty: Death (2003); Life imprisonment (1982)

Details
- Victims: 2–62
- Span of crimes: 1980 – 1981 (confirmed); 1967 – 1981 (confessed)
- Country: United States
- State: Florida
- Date apprehended: For the final time on January 6, 1982

James Delano Winkles (December 18, 1940 – September 9, 2010) was an American murderer, kidnapper and self-confessed serial killer. Initially sentenced to life imprisonment on kidnapping charges, he admitted responsibility for two murders committed in Pinellas County, Florida during the 1980s, for which he was convicted and sentenced to death. Winkles claimed that he had killed a total of 62 people during his lifetime, but no other murders were definitively corroborated, and he died awaiting execution in 2010.

== Crimes ==
From 1963 to 1982, Winkles moved around various counties across Florida, amassing arrests for multiple felonies. He made a living by stealing and doing odd jobs, only occasionally taking up work as a mechanic. Twice divorced, he eventually married for a third time to a woman named Mary Thomas, who gave birth to a child sometime in the mid-1970s. The pair would remain married until his final arrest.

On September 12, 1981, Winkles was arrested in Pinellas County on charges of fraud for selling forged documents, but was released from custody after posting bail. A month later, the decapitated body of a woman was found on a property in Citrus County, and while the coroner was unable to establish the cause of death, he put the victim's date of death as sometime between late September or early October. Winkles became a suspect after an anonymous witness contacted the authorities and claimed that they had seen Winkles' wife on the property. While Winkles admitted that they had camped out there in early October, he claimed that he was unaware of the body. His testimony was corroborated by his wife, and since there was insufficient evidence to charge them, the pair were released.

On January 6, 1982, Winkles entered a real estate agency based in Seminole County and, using the alias 'David Longstreet', asked the 28-year-old saleswoman Donna Maltby to show him some of the homes for sale. After he chose one of the properties, they arranged to meet on the next day for a detailed inspection. On the early morning, Winkles called the agency and said that his car had broken down, requesting that Maltby pick him up from the parking lot of a hotel he was staying at. After she arrived, he told her that he had managed to fix up his car and offered to drive her to the property, to which Maltby agreed. Along the way, however, Winkles sexually assaulted and then stabbed her several times with a knife. He then tied her up and threw her onto the back seat of the car where, under knifepoint, he stole her money and credit cards.

Winkles had intended to drive Maltby to Tampa, where he had a rental apartment, but lost his way in the fog and had to stop at a gas station in Pine Hills. To avoid arousing suspicion, he removed her restraints and ordered her to sit in the front seat. Despite his death threats, Maltby managed to get out of the car and call for help, whereupon the employees called the police. Winkles was arrested soon afterwards and brought to the police station, where he tried to claim that he had seen Maltby stealing $8,900 from her agency's cash register, but no such money was found. He then tried to convince the investigators that he had no intention of abducting or assaulting her, but a search of his vehicle turned up drugs, a set of handcuffs, rope, duct tape, bottles of alcoholic beverages and a briefcase containing women's underwear that did not belong to Maltby.

According to the investigators, the items found during the search were likely tools used in abductions of other victims, with the women's underwear possibly being fragments of their clothing which was kept as a trophy. Winkles was eventually charged with rape and kidnapping, for which he was found guilty and sentenced to life imprisonment on July 15, 1982. He attempted to withdraw his guilty plea, claiming that his lawyer had lied to him about what the max possible sentence could be. This motion was denied by a judge, and his life term was upheld.

== Connection to murders ==
In August 1983, forensic analysis identified the victim found in Citrus County as 39-year-old Margo Delimon, a real estate agent who went missing on October 3, 1981. Authorities then interviewed Winkles' wife again, with Thomas revealing that she had jewelry and a photograph of a woman among her husband's possessions, but did not know who they belonged to or who the woman was. After Delimon's identification, Thomas confirmed that she was the woman in the photograph.

As both Delimon and Maltby worked in real estate agencies, investigators suspected that Winkles kidnapped and murdered the former due to the similar modus operandi. Around this time, he was proposed as a suspect in the disappearance of 19-year-old Elizabeth Graham, an employee of a mobile grooming service that went missing on September 9, 1980. Her van was found abandoned near a vacant house in Largo, with one of the tires being punctured by a knife. However, as Graham's body had not been located at the time, authorities were unable to charge Winkles in her case. For the remainder of the 1980s until the late 1990s, he remained the prime suspect in the murders and disappearances of several women around Florida, but was never charged.

== Confessions ==
=== Elizabeth Graham ===
After his conviction, Winkles was transferred to the Hardee Correctional Institution to serve his sentence. In February 1998, he contacted the Pinellas County Prosecutor's Office and confessed to murdering Delimon and Graham. During a conversation with representatives of the Prosecutor's Office, Winkles offered a deal in which he would plead guilty to the crimes in exchange for not receiving the death penalty, but this was denied. Over the next several months, Winkles participated in various investigative experiments and spoke at length about his crimes, but was unable to remember where exactly he had dumped Graham's body. During interrogations, he claimed that he had met her in Clearwater and later recognized her workplace. After learning this, he arranged to meet her the next day, ostensibly because he wanted his pet dachshund to be trimmed.

After Graham arrived at the address given to her, Winkles raped her at gunpoint before handcuffing, gagging and forcing her into the passenger seat of his van. He then stole $20 from her wallet and stabbed the tire of her vehicle, before driving her to his grandmother's house, where he sexually assaulted and sodomized her for four days. Winkles claimed that both his grandmother and aunt had witnessed this take place, but neither called the police. On the fifth day, he discovered that Graham had learned the address of his grandmother's house after she found magazines, newspapers and a number of other items that had been mailed to the house. Angered, he forced her to take a large dose of sleeping pills, which caused her to fall asleep. He then waited for his grandmother and aunt to leave before shooting Graham in the head three times with a pistol.

Winkles then put the corpse in his car and drove to a wooded section of Pinellas County, where he buried it. He then burned Graham's clothes and personal possessions stained with blood. Sixteen days later, he returned to the burial site and dug up the grave, then removed the skull, lower jaw and all the teeth. Winkles then threw the skull into the Steinhatchee River, where it was found washed ashore on July 3, 1981. In the aftermath of Winkles' confession, the skull was conclusively identified as Graham's in late 1999, with the advancements of DNA technology.

=== Margo Delimon ===
Approximately five or six weeks before Delimon's kidnapping, Winkles and Thomas were vacationing in the countryside when their interest was drawn to a house under construction. When the project was nearing completion, Winkles went to a local real estate agency, where he met Delimon. The day before she was kidnapped, he arranged a meeting with her at the house to discuss the layout. On October 3, 1981, when Delimon arrived, Winkles claimed that he offered her breakfast after which he assaulted her at gunpoint. He then dragged her into his car, handcuffed her wrists and drove to a vacant home located on the same street as his grandmother's house. There he handcuffed Delimon to a bed and proceeded to periodically rape her for four days.

On the fifth day, Winkles removed her restraints and put her in his car, and then drove around the city aimlessly for several hours. He claimed that Delimon remained calm and did not attempt to escape, even when he suggested that they take a walk on the beach and visit a fast-food restaurant for dinner. Winkles claimed that he eventually had to kill her, since she had identified where his grandmother's house was. According to his testimony, after completing the trip, they returned to the vacant house, where he forced her to take a large amount of sleeping pills that caused Delimon to overdose. Winkles then took the murdered woman's corpse to a wooded area of Pinellas County, where he buried it. Sixteen days later he exhumed the remains, only to discover that the body had been torn apart by wild animals. He decided to move the remainder of the remains to Citrus County, where he reburied it. A few days later, he dug up the grave yet again and then severed the head from the body and pulled out all its teeth.

After burying the remains once again, Winkles traveled to Hernando County, where he buried the skull in a forest and burned Delimon's clothes. He later gave her watch and earrings to his aunt and sold her diamond ring for $400. Delimon's skull was discovered on May 23, 1982, but was only identified as hers after Winkles' confession thanks to DNA analysis. Winkles later pointed out the exact location of her burial site.

In January 1999, he suddenly recanted some of his testimony regarding Graham's murder. In this version, he claimed that he not taken her to his grandmother's house but to Suwannee County, where he had rented a trailer. After the confessions, Winkles claimed that he began to suffer from visual hallucinations for nearly two decades, seeing images of his victims. This had a negative effect on his physical and mental health which ultimately led him to admit responsibility, stating that he had begun to feel remorse and urgently wanted to contact the victims' relatives to ask for forgiveness.

To the investigators' shock, Winkles later admitted to killing about 62 girls and women from 1967 to 1981, around 41 of which were killed in Pinellas County. He did not give many details about these crimes, but stated that the true extent of his crimes would "make Ted Bundy look like a choirboy."

== Trial, sentence, and death ==
Because Winkles provided details only for the murders of Graham and Delimon, he was indicted for their deaths on March 25, 1999. At trial, he pleaded guilty to all charges and was sentenced to death on April 14, 2003. He was then transferred to the Union Correctional Institution's death row.

For the following seven years, Winkles and his attorneys attempted to have his sentence commuted on several occasions. They provided various reasons for the appeals, ranging from mitigating circumstances such as his childhood abuse and his current health problems to his reputation as a model inmate. Each of these appeals was dismissed by the courts, which contended that the severity of his crimes warranted the death penalty. Winkles' final appeal was denied in 2009.

Winkles eventually died awaiting execution on September 9, 2010. As he had refused to cooperate with authorities after his conviction, the credibility of his confessions remains dubious and the true number of his possible victims remains unknown.

== See also ==
- Ted Bundy
- Capital punishment in Florida
