= Reception and Medical Center =

Prison in Florida, United States

Coordinates: 29°59′21″N 82°21′30″W

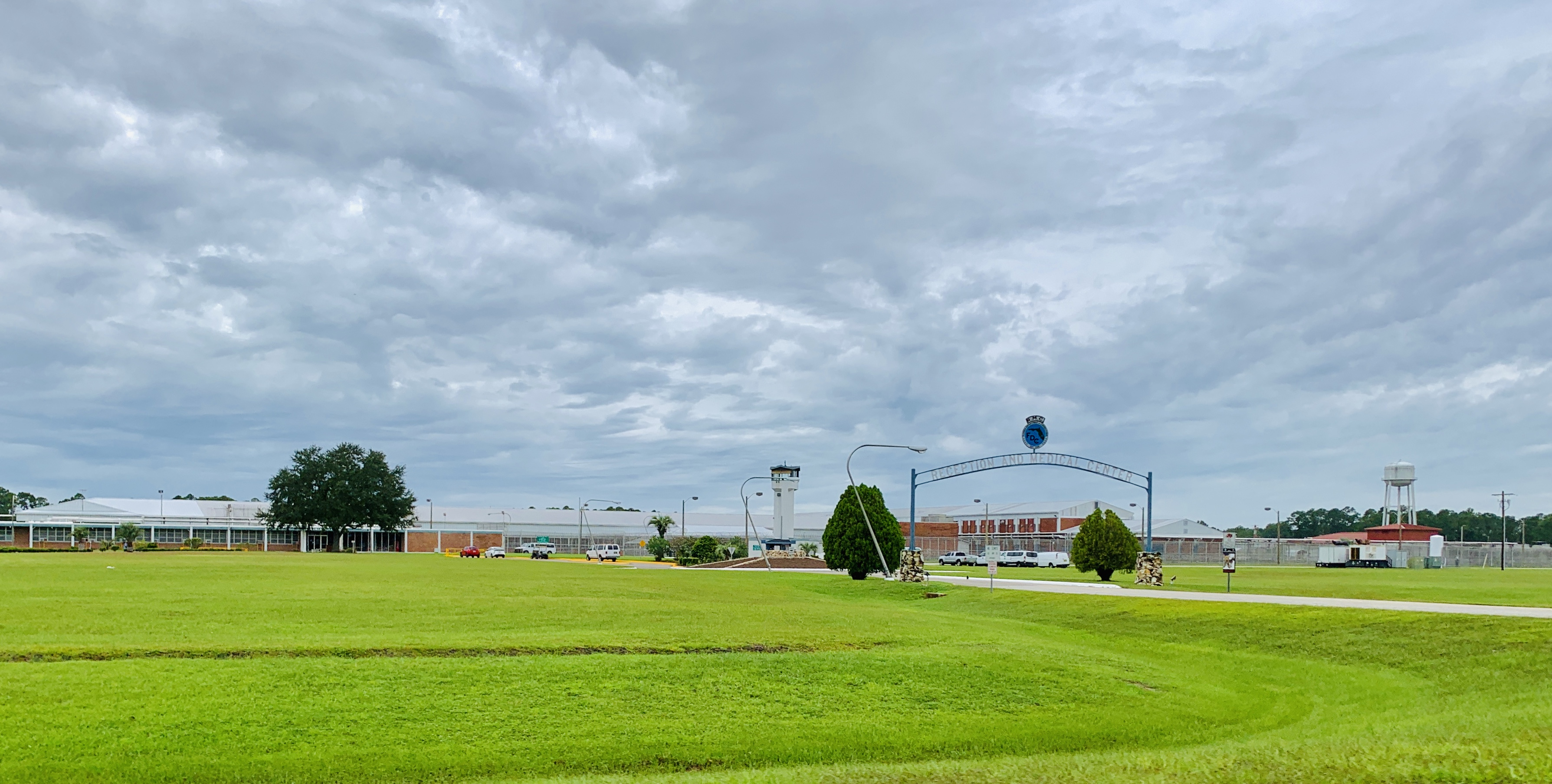
- Interactive map of Reception and Medical Center
- Location: 7765 County Road 231 Lake Butler postal address, Florida
- Status: open
- Security class: mixed
- Capacity: 1,503 + 1,148 + 432 = 3,082
- Opened: 1968
- Managed by: Florida Department of Corrections

The Reception and Medical Center (RMC) is a state prison and hospital for men located in unincorporated Union County, Florida, with a Lake Butler postal address. The facility was founded in 1968 as an intake and processing point for all male state prisoners and a secure medical facility.

As of 2016, the facility can house a maximum of 1,503 prisoners with a range of security levels. The nearby Reception and Medical Center, West Unit houses another 1,148 and Reception and Medical Center, Work Camp houses 432.

In April 2015, two correctional officers and a third former officer were charged in a scheme to murder a former inmate, in retaliation for a fight in the RMC the previous year. All three officers were linked to the Traditional American Knights of the Ku Klux Klan.

== Notable inmates ==
- Edward Surratt
- Richard Wershe Jr.

== See also ==
- Florida Department of Corrections
- List of Florida state prisons
