= Blackwater River Correctional Facility =

Private state prison in Milton, Florida

Coordinates: 30°38′45″N 86°57′04″W

- Interactive map of Blackwater River Correctional Facility
- Location: 5914 Jeff Ates Road Milton, Florida
- Status: mixed
- Capacity: 2000
- Opened: 2010
- Managed by: GEO Group

The Blackwater River Correctional Facility is a private state prison for men located in Milton, Santa Rosa County, Florida, which was opened in 2010 by the GEO Group under contract with the Florida Department of Corrections. This facility houses about 2,000 inmates at a variety of security levels.

== Notable inmates ==
- Michael Frederick Griffin, convicted to 25 years of life in prison for the Murder of David Gunn, on March 10, 1993.
- Nicholas Lindsey, Murderer of a police officer.
- Joel Faviere, former singer of Get Scared.
