= Walton Correctional Institution =

Prison in Walton County, Florida, United States

Coordinates: 30°46′41″N 86°06′10″W

- Interactive map of Walton Correctional Institution
- Location: 691 Institution Road DeFuniak Springs, Florida
- Status: mixed
- Capacity: 1201
- Opened: 1990
- Managed by: Florida Department of Corrections

The Walton Correctional Institution is a state prison for men located in DeFuniak Springs, Walton County, Florida, owned and operated by the Florida Department of Corrections. This facility has a mix of security levels, including minimum, medium, and close, and houses adult male offenders. Walton first opened in 1990 and has a maximum capacity of 1201 prisoners.

Serial Killer Paul Durousseau is an inmate here, as is one of perpetrators of the Murder of Teresa Sievers, Curtis Wayne Wright Jr.
