= Grant Amato =

American murderer (born 1989)

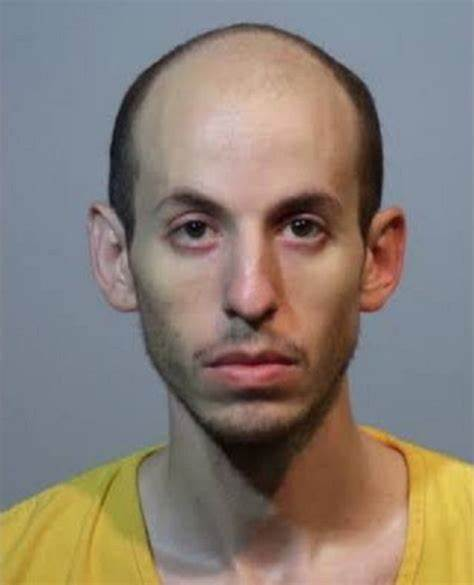
- Mug shot of Amato, 2019
- Born: Grant Tiernan Amato; May 20, 1989 (age 37); Orlando, Florida, U.S.
- Education: University of Central Florida
- Status: Incarcerated
- Motive: Pornography addiction Stole large sums of money from family to support addiction Obsession
- Conviction: Premeditated first-degree murder (3 counts)
- Penalty: 3 life sentences without the possibility of parole

Details
- Date: January 24, 2019
- Location: Chuluota, Florida
- Killed: 3
- Date apprehended: January 26, 2019
- Imprisoned at: Gulf Correctional Institution (as of July 2026)

Grant Tiernan Amato (born May 20, 1989) is an American murderer and former nurse who was convicted of a familicide that occurred on the evening of January 24, 2019. Amato shot and killed his father, mother, and brother Cody in the head at their home in Chuluota, Florida, while attempting to stage it as a murder-suicide committed by his brother before fleeing the residence. He was captured after a 24-hour manhunt, put on trial, found guilty, and sentenced to 3 life sentences without the possibility of parole.

Before the murders occurred, Amato had developed an infatuation with Bulgarian model and cam girl Silviya Ventsislavova (Bulgarian: Силвия Венциславова), who went by the alias "Silvie" or "adysweet" online. Amato used some of his father's and brother's money that amounted to $200,000 to pay to attend her webcam sessions. His family attempted to provide therapy and treatment by forcing him to a rehabilitation center. After a week of treatment, he returned home, where he argued with his father over continuing to contact Ventsislavova. A month later, this argument emerged as the primary motive for the murders.

== Background ==
Grant Amato was born on May 20, 1989, in Orlando, Florida, to Chad Robert Amato, a clinical pharmacist, and Margaret Anne Amato (née Wade), a senior operations manager for a medical transcription company.He was raised in Chuluota along with his brother Cody, with whom he was close. His elder half-brother Jason lived elsewhere. He went to Timber Creek High School, along with Cody, and they both joined the weightlifting team together after getting interested in health. Both Cody and Grant attended the University of Central Florida, where they attended nursing school together and then proceeded to pursue further studies to become nurse anesthetists. Cody graduated from his nurse anesthetist program while Grant dropped out, though Grant was able to find work at AdventHealth Orlando as a nurse.

Grant was suspended from his job in June 2018 under suspicion of stealing and improperly administering medication to patients and for suicidal thoughts. Although officers denied the allegations that he was suicidal, saying he did not meet the criteria to be a danger to himself or others around him, they concluded there was evidence to the claim of improper medicine administration. Hospital staff had found eight empty vials of the sedative propofol, which had not been ordered by any doctors, in two rooms that Grant had been overseeing. When questioned during his suspension, he said that he had "administered the drug to patients who were not being adequately relaxed." The hospital then fired him, and police officers subsequently arrested him for grand larceny after the investigation concluded, but the charges were later dropped.

=== Silvie and arguments ===
Due to his inability to find work following the charges, he attempted to become a live streamer on Twitch, mostly by playing video games and live streaming. After the family paid for equipment and streaming setup, Amato instead used the money to visit pornographic websites, including the site MyFreeCams, which is where Amato met a cam model named Silviya Ventsislavova, who went by the alias "Silvie" or "adysweet" online. He would pay tokens by the minute for her virtual company. He would spend up to four hours a night on the website, buying up to 5,000 tokens at a time costing over $600. Silvie's shows would cost 90 tokens a minute. Grant assumed a façade as a rich and successful gamer, sending her various lingerie and sex toys, as well as paying an exorbitant amount for her time. He would steal credit cards from his family, claiming they were for starting up his Twitch career. Within a few months, Grant had spent $200,000 of his family's money on Silvie.

His family sent Grant to a rehabilitation facility for internet addiction and pornography addiction on December 22. 2018, which cost them $15,000. He was allowed to return home after a couple of weeks but was given a zero-tolerance ultimatum: Grant had to get a job and was prohibited from having any contact with Silvie. However, he was able to convince his mother to let him use her phone to make contact with the webcam model. Upon learning this, Chad ordered Grant to pack up his things and leave the house.

== Murders ==
On January 24, 2019, while his mother was on the computer, Grant shot her in the back of the head with an IWI Jericho 941 pistol, which he had reportedly stolen, along with 6 rounds, from a friend months prior to the murders. After, he waited for his father to arrive. Once he walked into the kitchen, Grant shot him twice. To convince Cody to come home after his nursing shift, he sent him a phone message using his father's number. Upon entering the door, Grant shot him dead, where he lay in a fetal position. Before leaving the residence, Grant attempted to stage the crime as a murder-suicide, placing the gun by his brother's body.

The next day, when Cody failed to come in for work, his coworkers became concerned and called the police to request a wellness check. Police arrived at the murder scene at 9:17 a.m., entering the house after receiving no response from occupants and finding all the entrances locked. Chad was found on his back on the kitchen floor, Cody curled on the floor in a storage room, and Margaret sprawled over the desk in their home office. Amato was tracked down at a DoubleTree Hotel at approximately 7:45 a.m. on January 26 in Orange County, Florida, after his 1996 Honda Accord was identified.

Grant was subsequently taken in for questioning. At the end of the interrogation, his brother Jason tried to talk to him, asking him to confess to what had happened, but Grant was unwavering in his claims of innocence. When being interrogated, he offered differing stories, one of which said he'd seen police and news vans outside his house following the murders, but instead of going home he went to a local Panera Bread and searched for "top news stories." He was subsequently arrested on charges of first-degree murder. His bond was set at $750,000 on April 25, 2019, after his public defender argued, and the prosecutor agreed, that he could not be held without bond. If he could post the bond, a number of conditions were set including no access to electronic devices with internet. Grant did not post the bond and remained in custody.

== Trial ==
Amato's trial began on July 15, 2019. Before people testified, crime scene analysts on behalf of the prosecution attempted to show things that were out of place, but Amato's attorney questioned when they realized he was the main suspect and if that could have affected the examination. On August 9, individuals were asked to testify as part of the penalty phase, with three people testifying on each side's behalf. Grant's brother Jason testified against him. The state of Florida informed the judge that they intended to seek the death penalty. The jury did not unanimously agree to sentence Amato to death, however, resulting in an automatic sentence of life in prison without the possibility of parole. On August 12, Amato was found guilty of all three counts of first-degree murder, receiving a life sentence for each. When asked if he felt remorse, Amato responded with, "My family has been blaming me for months for ruining their lives, stealing, and not following the rules of the home, so I might as well be blamed for this too."

== Life in prison ==
As of March 2026, Amato is imprisoned at Hardee Correctional Institution in Bowling Green, Florida.

In 2025, it was revealed Amato had been exchanging romantic and sexual text messages through a smuggled phone with Victoria Goodwin, the wife of Ghost Adventures star Aaron Goodwin, who had disclosed to Amato her plan to hire a hitman to murder her husband. Amato contacted a hitman and Victoria paid the hitman. The hitman never ended up doing it for unknown reasons, and Victoria was arrested and charged for the plot. No charges against Amato were reported. Victoria was given a prison sentence of 3 to 8 years.

== In media ==
Amato's case was the subject of "Ctrl+Alt+Desire," a three-part docuseries directed by Colin Archdeacon that premiered on Paramount+ on April 16, 2024 and was broadcast on April 7, 2025 on BBC Player under the title "The Man Who Murdered His Family." The documentary chronicles Amato's obsession with a Bulgarian cam model, his theft of approximately $200,000 from his family, and the subsequent murders. Archdeacon spent four years filming and interviewing Amato, gaining unprecedented access that included prison phone calls. Former CBS News president Susan Zirinsky served as executive producer on the project.

The case was also featured in an episode of the true crime series "Killer Cases" titled "Murder and the Sex Cam Model" (Season 2, Episode 2), which aired on February 25, 2022.
