= Sumter Correctional Institution =

Prison in Bushnell, Florida, United States

Coordinates: 28°37′03″N 82°12′19″W

- Interactive map of Sumter Correctional Institution
- Location: 9544 C 476B Bushnell, Florida
- Status: mixed
- Capacity: 1639
- Opened: 1965
- Managed by: Florida Department of Corrections

The Sumter Correctional Institution is a state prison for men located in Bushnell, Sumter County, Florida, owned and operated by the Florida Department of Corrections. This facility has a mix of security levels, including minimum, medium, and close, and houses both adult male and young male offenders. Sumter first opened in 1965 and has a maximum capacity of 1639 prisoners.

Sumter Correctional Institution is the location of the state's only Basic Training Unit for Youthful Offenders in the Department of Corrections. After completing the 120 day program with a heavy course load of drill practice, education, physical training and a highly regimented daily schedule inmates are released to serve the remainder of their sentence on probation the day of graduation.

An alleged sexual assault against a 17-year-old inmate by six other prisoners in July 2013 triggered a federal lawsuit against the institution.
