= Hardee Correctional Institution =

State prison in Bowling Green, Florida, US

Coordinates: 27°35′28″N 82°00′42″W

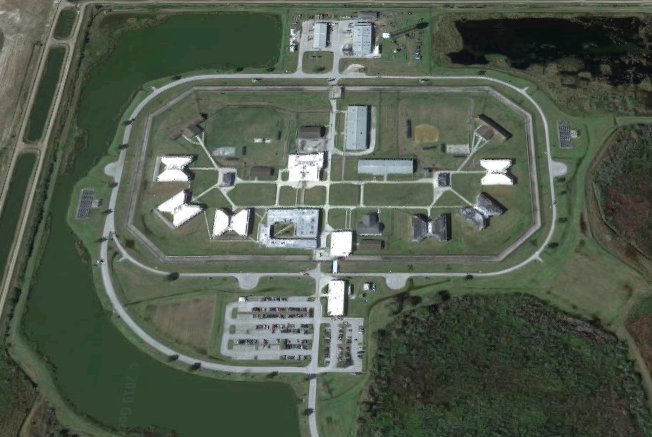
- HARCI overhead view
- Interactive map of Hardee Correctional Institution
- Location: 6901 State Road 62 Bowling Green, Florida 33834-9505
- Status: Operational
- Security class: Minimum, medium, and close
- Capacity: 1,746 = 1,438 (main unit) + 308 (work camp)
- Population: 1,727 = 1,429 (main unit) + 298 (work camp) (February 2023)
- Opened: 1991
- Managed by: Florida Department of Corrections
- Warden: Thomas Sager
- Website: https://www.fdc.myflorida.com/institutions/institutions-list/501

The Hardee Correctional Institution (HARCI) is a state prison for men located in unincorporated Hardee County, Florida, with a Bowling Green postal address. It is owned and operated by the Florida Department of Corrections. This facility has a mix of security levels, including minimum, medium, and close, and houses adult male offenders.

== History ==
Hardee first opened in April 1991 and has a maximum capacity of 1,746 inmates.

In 2015, a campus of the New Orleans Baptist Theological Seminary was established in the penitentiary.

== Notable inmates ==
Notable Inmates
Name	Known for	Status	Source
Grant Amato	Convicted of a familicide in 2019		
Alfonza Smalls	Accomplice of double murderer Richard Henyard		
Fred Waterfield	Cousin and accomplice of serial killer David Alan Gore		
James Winkles	Murderer and alleged serial killer	Transferred to and died at Union Correctional Institution	
