= South Florida Reception Center =

Prison in Florida, United States

Coordinates: 25°48′25″N 80°25′32″W

- Interactive map of South Florida Reception Center
- Location: 14000 NW 41st Street Miami-Dade County, Florida
- Status: open
- Security class: mixed
- Capacity: 1315
- Opened: 1985
- Managed by: Florida Department of Corrections

The South Florida Reception Center (SFRC) is a state prison for men located in unincorporated Miami-Dade County, Florida, owned and operated by the Florida Department of Corrections.

This facility has a mix of security levels, including minimum, medium, and close, and houses adult male offenders. SFRC first opened in 1985 and has a maximum capacity of 1315 prisoners.
