= Bay Correctional Facility =

Prison in Florida, United States

Coordinates: 30°15′57″N 85°30′20″W

- Interactive map of Bay Correctional Facility
- Location: 5400 Bayline Drive Panama City, Florida
- Status: mixed
- Capacity: 985
- Opened: 1995
- Managed by: GEO Group (since 2014)

The Bay Correctional Facility is a private state prison for men located in Panama City, Bay County, Florida, which has been operated since February 2014 by the GEO Group under contract with the Florida Department of Corrections. This facility was opened in 1995 and has a maximum capacity of 985 prisoners. Corrections Corporation of America was the prior operator of the prison.
