= Taylor Correctional Institution =

Prison in Florida, United States

Coordinates: 30°02′14″N 83°42′50″W

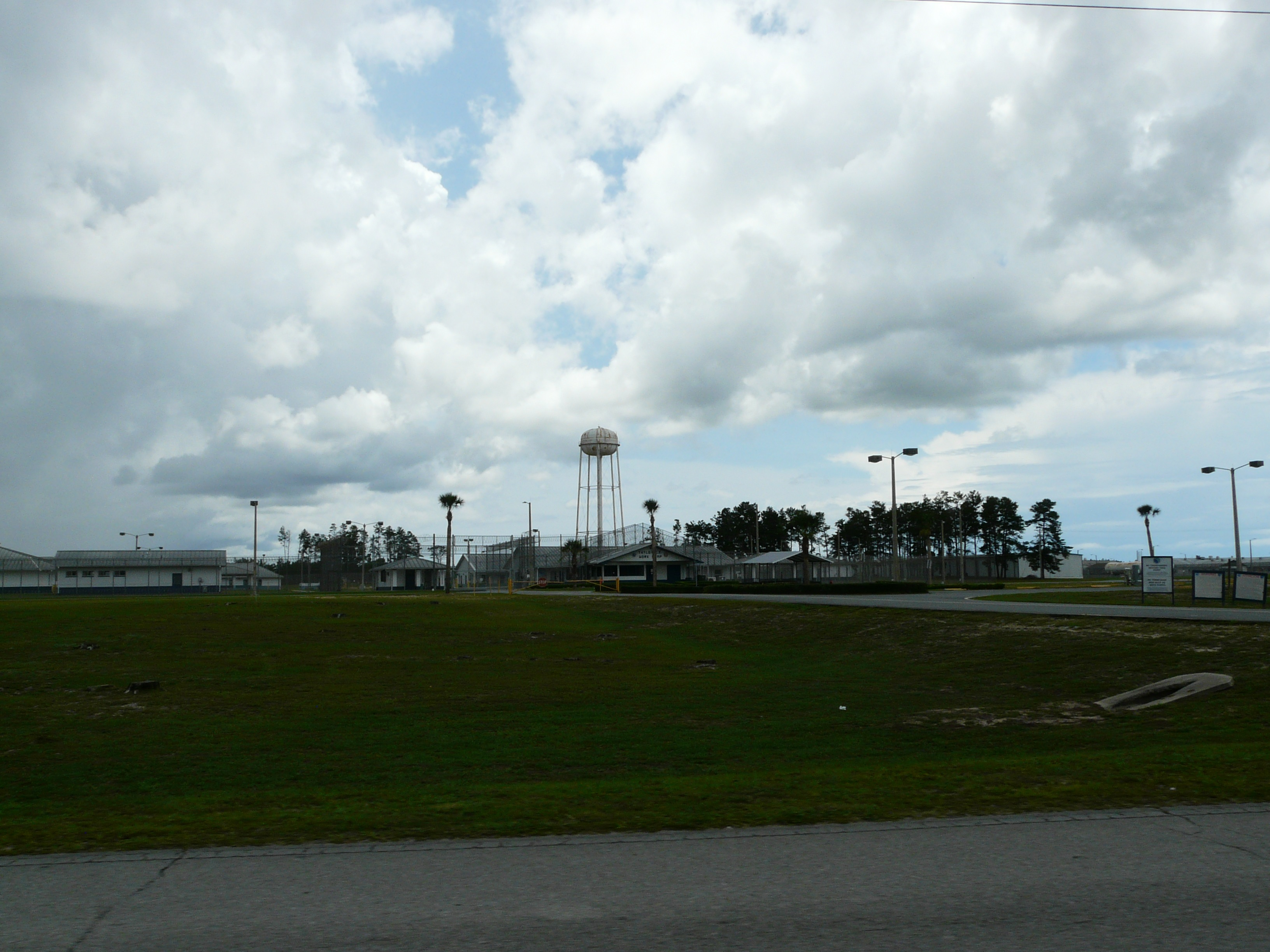
- TCI Work Camp
- Interactive map of Taylor Correctional Institution
- Location: 8501 Hampton Springs Road Perry, Florida
- Status: open
- Capacity: 1301 + 1409 in Annex = 2710 total
- Opened: 1994
- Managed by: Florida Department of Corrections

The Taylor Correctional Institution is a state prison for men located in Taylor County, Florida, owned and operated by the Florida Department of Corrections.

This facility has a mix of security levels, including minimum, medium, and close, and houses adult male offenders. Taylor first opened in 1994 and has a maximum capacity of 1301 prisoners.

The adjacent Taylor Annex opened in 2002 as a youth offender facility, then converted into a facility for adult males in 2005. It has a maximum capacity of 1409 inmates.

== Incidents ==
In 2014 two correctional officers were charged with multiple felonies for ordering a Taylor inmate, David Powell, to be killed. Powell, who had threatened to expose the officers' lucrative smuggling operations, escaped two stabbings without serious injury.
