= Paul Durousseau =

American serial killer (born 1970)

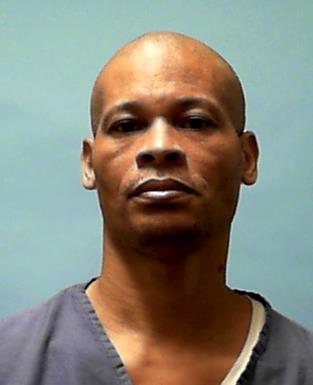
- Mug shot of Durousseau, 2022
- Born: August 11, 1970 (age 56); Beaumont, Texas, U.S.
- Other name: The Jacksonville Strangler
- Status: Incarcerated
- Conviction: First degree murder (5 counts)
- Penalty: Death; commuted to life imprisonment

Details
- Victims: 7 (confirmed, plus 2 unborn children)
- Span of crimes: January 6, 1997 – January 20, 2003
- Country: United States
- States: Georgia and Florida
- Date apprehended: June 17, 2003
- Imprisoned at: Northwest Florida Reception Center

Paul Durousseau (born August 11, 1970) is an American serial killer who murdered seven young women (two of whom were pregnant) in the southeastern United States between 1997 and 2003.

== Early life ==
Paul Durousseau was born in Beaumont, Texas, to Joseph Durousseau Sr. and Debra Moten. His father was abusive to Durousseau's mother, which included physical violence during her pregnancies. Shortly after his birth, Durousseau's father deserted the family to evade arrest by police for whipping his wife with a heated coat hanger. Together with his mother and older brother, Durousseau moved in with his maternal aunt in Los Angeles, California. Durousseau was born prematurely and with neonatal jaundice. At the age of eight months, Durousseau sustained a severe head injury from a fall from his stroller, exposing the skull on the back of his head, which required months of stationary treatment. He was diagnosed with severe anemia in 1986 and hypothyroidism in 2000, which are believed to have resulted in intellectual disabilities. According to psychiatrist Dorothy Otnow Lewis, who examined Durousseau in prison, his mother had Turner syndrome, with Lewis believing that Durousseau was also affected by the condition.

In 1971, his mother married Willie Paige, who was a veteran of the Vietnam War. Paige was prone to angry outbursts due to post-traumatic stress disorder, which included holding Durousseau's mother at gunpoint and threatening to burn down their house. When the pair broke up in 1982, Paige threatened to kill her children if he saw them again. Durousseau's mother later acknowledged that she physically punished Durousseau by sitting on him and spanking him, to the point where Durousseau could not breathe. Durousseau grew up in South Central Los Angeles, reportedly living in a neighborhood with gangs and frequent shootouts. Throughout his childhood, Durousseau attended six elementary schools, with his family living off social assistance and Medicaid. Durousseau's brother stated that both were negatively affected by the lack of a father figure, meeting their biological father around 1983, when Durousseau was 13 years old.

At school, Durousseau was classed as a slow learner and attended special education. He was also noted for chronic underweight, weighing 110 pounds (50 kg) at 6 ft 5 in (1.95 cm). Unlike some of his peers, he did not engage in alcohol consumption or drug use. He had to repeat a year in high school and was later transferred to Reseda Charter High School, after he was beaten by other students as part of a gang initiation. Durousseau graduated from Raseda at age 19 in 1989, finding employment as a security guard. Shortly after, Durousseau's mother gained custody of her sister's five children, three of whom inherited mental disabilities while the other two had hypothyroidism. According to Durousseau's mother, her son stayed at home to take care of his cousins, preventing one from dying by performing CPR, as well as herself after contracting chickenpox. In 1992, Durousseau had his first child with his girlfriend Lynette, financially supporting her and visiting his daughter on a weekly basis.

== First crimes ==
His first offenses as an adult took place on December 18, 1991, and January 21, 1992, for carrying a concealed firearm. In November 1992, Durousseau enlisted in the United States Army and was stationed in Germany, where he met his later wife Natoca, who was a fellow Army soldier. During his station in Germany, Durrouseau had two-thirds of his stomach surgically removed due to ulcers. The two married in 1995 in Las Vegas. In 1996 the couple were transferred to Fort Benning, Georgia, where, on March 13, 1997, Durousseau was arrested for kidnapping and raping a young woman. However, in August of that year he was cleared of those charges. Soon after, however, he was found in possession of stolen goods. Durousseau was court-martialed in January 1999, found guilty and dishonorably discharged from the Army.

Durousseau and his wife moved to Jacksonville, Florida, where they had two daughters in 1996 and 1997. Also in 1997, Durousseau had a fourth daughter through an extramarital affair. It was during this period that he committed most of the murders. Durousseau struggled to keep jobs to make ends meet, and the couple would often argue over their financial situation. In 1999, the police advised Natoca on how to file for a restraining order after Durousseau allegedly slapped her in the face and grabbed her by the neck. Later, she testified that he became violently angry when she talked about getting a divorce. In September and October 2001, Durousseau spent 48 days in jail for domestic battery.

Durousseau still managed to hold various legitimate jobs. In 2001, he was hired as a school bus driver and an animal control worker despite being a convicted felon. By 2003 he was working as a taxi driver for the Gator City Taxi Company, which was how he first came into contact with some of his victims. It was erroneously reported that the taxi company failed to run a background check on Durousseau; the City of Jacksonville was responsible for the background check, and issued Durousseau's taxi driver permit.

Neighbors and friends described Durousseau as a "lewd womanizer" who often asked young women when they planned to "make flicks" with him. A witness recalled him hitting on a girl that appeared to be around 13 or 14 years old.

== Murders ==
Durousseau started killing less than one month after the acquittal over the rape charges. His modus operandi would be that he would usually meet his victims (all young single African-American women) through his job and gain their trust to enter their homes, where he would bind them before proceeding to rape them before strangling them to death with a cord.

On September 7, 1997, the nude body of 26-year-old Tracy Habersham was found in Fort Benning. She had been missing for 48 hours and was last seen leaving a party. She had been raped and strangled to death with a cord. Durousseau was not a suspect in the murder, but DNA would later tie him to the crime. He later confessed to Habersham's killing after his arrest.

In 1999, Durousseau raped and killed 24-year-old Tyresa Mack in her apartment. Witnesses saw him leave her place carrying a television. In 2001, he was arrested for raping a young woman in Jacksonville. He spent 30 days in the Montgomery Correctional Center and received two years' probation. On December 19, 2002, 18-year-old Nicole L. Williams' body was found wrapped in a blue blanket at the bottom of a ditch in Jacksonville. She had been reported missing two days earlier.

On January 1, 2003, family members of 19-year-old Nikia Kilpatrick went to check on her. They had not had any news from her for several days. They found her body in the bedroom of her apartment. She had been raped then killed by strangulation with a cord two days before. Her two sons, an eleven-month-old and a two-year-old, were alive but malnourished. Kilpatrick was approximately six months pregnant at the time of her death. Eight days later, 20-year-old nurse assistant Shawanda Denise McCalister, who was also pregnant at the time of her death, was raped and strangled in her Jacksonville apartment. The murder scene was almost identical to that of Kilpatrick. She was killed on Durousseau's first day of driving a cab for Gator City Taxi. Her body was found the following day.

The next two victims were 17-year-old Jovanna Jefferson, and 19-year-old Surita Cohen. Their bodies were found close to each other in a ditch next to a construction site on New Kings Road in Jacksonville on February 5. Police estimated that Jefferson was murdered around January 20 and Cohen was killed 10 days later. Witnesses recount having seen the two last victims with a taxi driver fitting Paul Durousseau's description on the night they disappeared.

== Arrest ==
Durousseau was arrested and charged with five counts of murder on June 17, 2003. On December 13, 2007, he was sentenced to death by lethal injection for the murder of Tyresa Mack. As of August 18, 2013, he was still a resident on Florida's death row at Union Correctional Institution. In January 2017, Durousseau's death sentence was overturned by the Florida Supreme Court. The jury that sentenced Durousseau was split 10-2 and the high court declared a split decision unconstitutional in capital sentencing. He was resentenced to life in prison without parole on December 10, 2021, after a jury split 10–2 in favor of another death sentence.

After Durousseau was linked to Mack's murder, investigators looked into other unsolved murder cases in places where Durousseau had previously lived, including the U.S. states of Florida, Georgia, Oklahoma, Alabama, and California, as well as Germany.

== See also ==
- List of death row inmates in the United States
- List of serial killers in the United States
