= Northwest Florida Reception Center =

State prison in Chipley, Florida, US

Coordinates: 30°31′14″N 85°39′31″W

- Overhead view of NWFRC
- Interactive map of Northwest Florida Reception Center
- Location: 4455 Sam Mitchell Drive Chipley, Florida
- Status: Operational
- Security class: Minimum, medium, and close
- Capacity: 2,666 = 1,181 (main) + 1,415 (annex) + 70 (work release center)
- Population: 2,506 = 1,415 (main) + 1,026 (annex) + 65 (work release center) (February 2024)
- Opened: 1994
- Managed by: Florida Department of Corrections
- Warden: Chadd Harrell

Northwest Florida Reception Center is a state prison for men located in unincorporated Washington County, Florida, owned and operated by the Florida Department of Corrections. The facility was originally known as the Washington Correctional Institution. NWFRC opened in 1994 with a mix of security levels and a capacity of 1303.

The adjacent Northwest Florida Reception Center Annex opened in 2008, and houses another 1415 inmates at the same security levels.

NWFRC was described in press reports as "one of the state’s most notoriously violent prisons" as six correctional officers were arrested and charged with felony abuse against prisoners in September 2014.

== Notable inmates ==
Inmate Name	Register Number	Status	Details
Devon Arthurs	A81924	Scheduled for release in 2062.	Murdered two roommates in 2017, and the case was noted for the unusual details, as Arthurs was a member of the Atomwaffen Division, a Neo-Nazi organization, before converting to Islam shortly before his crime.
Paul Durousseau	J19087	Serving a life sentence.	Serial killer.
