= Richard Henyard =

American murderer (1974–2008)

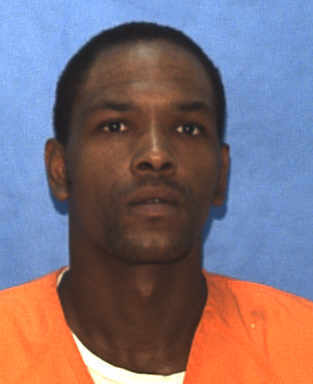
- Henyard shortly before his execution
- Born: June 26, 1974; Eustis, Florida, U.S.
- Died: September 23, 2008 (aged 34); Florida State Prison, Florida, U.S.
- Status: Executed by lethal injection
- Convictions: First degree murder (2 counts); Attempted first degree murder Kidnapping (3 counts); Sexual battery Armed robbery
- Penalty: Death

Alfonza Smalls
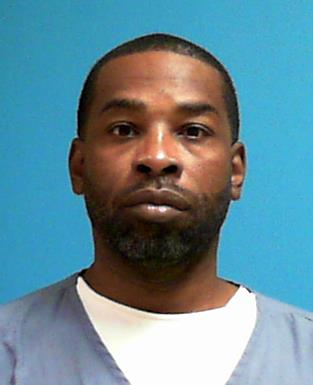
- Smalls (c. 2022)
- Born: August 18, 1978 (age 48); Florida, U.S.
- Status: Incarcerated
- Convictions: First degree murder (2 counts); Attempted first degree murder Kidnapping (3 counts); Sexual battery Armed robbery
- Penalty: Life imprisonment

Details
- Imprisoned at: Hardee Correctional Institution

Richard Henyard (June 26, 1974 – September 23, 2008) was an American murderer executed in Florida for the double murder of sisters Jamilya and Jasmine Lewis in January 1993, and the rape and attempted murder of the girls' mother. Henyard committed the murders with an accomplice, 14-year-old Alfonza Smalls (born August 18, 1978). Due to his age, Smalls received a life sentence.

== Crimes ==
On the evening of January 30, 1993, Dorothy Lewis and her daughters arrived at a Winn-Dixie supermarket in Eustis. As they entered the Winn-Dixie, Lewis noticed a few people sitting on a bench near the doors. After Lewis exited the store with Jamilya, age 7, and Jasmine, age 3, she walked to her car and placed her daughters in the front passenger seat.

As Lewis crossed the rear of the car to get to the driver's side, she noticed Alfonza Smalls approaching her. Smalls then revealed a gun tucked into his waistband. Lewis and her daughters were ordered into the back of the car as Smalls and Henyard entered the front. The Lewis car left town with Henyard driving and Smalls issuing directions. Prior to the abduction of Lewis and her daughters, a witness observed Henyard and Smalls loitering outside of the Winn-Dixie. During the drive, Smalls repeatedly demanded that Lewis keep her crying daughters quiet. When Lewis pleaded with the teens to keep her and release her children, Smalls said, "No, we can't do that." When Henyard heard Lewis praying, he told her, "This ain't Jesus, this is Satan."

Later, following Smalls's directions, Henyard pulled the car over at a remote area and took Lewis out of the car. Henyard then raped her as she begged him not to do it in front of her children. At one point, she tried to grab a nearby gun, but Smalls grabbed it first, taunted her, and then also raped her. Henyard then told Lewis to sit on the ground. When she hesitated, Henyard shot her in the leg and forced her to the ground. The two struggled, and Smalls came over to help Henyard. Henyard then shot Lewis an additional three times at close range, wounding her in the mouth, neck, and head. After she was unconscious, Henyard and Smalls rolled her over to the shoulder of the road.

Lewis survived, however, and several hours later regained consciousness and went to a nearby house for help. The occupants contacted the police and Lewis collapsed and waited for the officers to arrive. As Henyard and Smalls drove away from the scene of the shooting, Jamilya and Jasmine Lewis repeatedly pleaded for their mother. Henyard pulled the car over after a short period of time and removed the girls from the car. Henyard and Smalls took the girls away from the road, out of the clear view of passersby, and Henyard killed the girls; Jamilya was shot through the top of her head while Jasmine was shot in her left eye. Henyard and Smalls then threw their bodies into some brush over a fence.

Smalls, Henyard, and a third individual arrived at the home of Bryant Smith in a blue car. Henyard boasted about raping and killing Lewis, unaware that she was still alive. He also showed Smith the gun he used. Later that evening, Henyard went by the Smalls' residence where Colinda Smalls, Alfonza's sister, noticed blood on Henyard's hands. Henyard told her the blood was from a minor knife accident.

On January 31, the next day, Henyard's aunt, Linda Miller, agreed to drive him to Smalls' residence so Henyard could speak with Smalls. Henyard went to the Eustis Police Department that same Sunday claiming to have information concerning the Lewis case. He offered knowledge of the crime, and claimed that he was present at the scene of the crime. Henyard's initial story pointed to Smalls and another individual as the perpetrators. However, when an officer noticed blood spots on Henyard's socks, he admitted to kidnapping, raping and shooting Lewis, but denied shooting her daughters. The police apprehended Smalls and discovered the murder weapon after a search of his bedroom.

Another teenager, 16-year-old Manuel Yon Jr., was arrested for providing Henyard and Smalls with a change of clothes after the murders.

== Sentencing and Henyard's execution ==
Henyard and Smalls both attempted to blame each other for the girls' murders. However, they were both found guilty of two counts of first degree murder under the state's felony murder rule. Henyard was sentenced to death on August 19, 1994, and sent to death row to await execution.

Henyard's death warrant was signed on June 9, 2008. Henyard was executed on September 23, 2008, by lethal injection. The execution was delayed by two hours because Henyard had two appeals before the U.S. Supreme Court trying to block the execution; both were denied. His last meal consisted of two fried-chicken breasts, turkey sausage, fried rice, prison-made chocolate-chip cookies, and Coca-Cola. When Henyard was asked if he had any last words, he replied, "No, sir." Henyard was the 66th person executed in Florida since capital punishment was reinstated in the United States in the 1970s.

Smalls was sentenced to life in prison without parole due to his age.

Yon was sentenced to 22 months in prison for being an accessory after the fact. He has been in and out of prison on various charges since then. In 2018, Yon was arrested for beating his girlfriend, albeit the charges were later dropped. He was arrested on drug charges in 2020.

== Aftermath with Smalls ==
In 2019, Smalls was granted a resentencing hearing due to a Supreme Court ruling in Miller v. Alabama declaring life without parole for juveniles to be unconstitutional.

At the hearing, Smalls's lawyers argued that he was influenced by Henyard. Smalls said, "I know it was a cruel and unusual act. I know I burdened the family a lot. . . . I can’t bring that back. It can't be redone. I have been rehabilitated and the only way I can prove it is to be released from prison." Smalls also claimed that he didn't know Henyard "until he showed up at my house." Regarding his time in prison, he said he had been a cook for more than 20 years and would either start his own business or work for someone else if he was released.

Arguing for Smalls to be resentenced to life in prison, the prosecution said the crimes were planned and that he had been the one in control. They read court transcripts showing that Smalls was not nervous or afraid of Henyard on the night of the murders. They pointed out that Smalls initiated the robbery, refused to release Lewis and her children, directed Henyard to an isolated area, stopped Lewis from grabbing a gun, and helped subdue Lewis when she struggled.

The prosecution also pointed to Smalls's prison record, saying that while he was not the worst inmate, he had 14 reports and 52 warnings, although most were for less serious infractions, and only one report was for fighting. Lewis, who has since remarried and has a son, asked for Smalls's sentence to be upheld.

Circuit Judge Mark Hill, who presided over the initial trials for Henyard and Smalls, resentenced Smalls to life in prison. He said he did not find any mitigating factors, change in attitude, or evidence that he could be rehabilitated. "This case is impregnated from one end to the other with the most foul and obscene set of circumstances I can imagine," he said. The co-defendant was actually found not to be the 'ring leader,' with regards to the crime. ... It was the defendant who carried out the majority of the orders and the most grotesque parts of the crime."

Mentioning Smalls's prison record, Hill said "The defendant has failed to provide or demonstrate any measurable ability to be a productive citizen, in fact he has failed to even be a productive inmate. The defendant would pose a severe risk to society and that such risk outweighs any potential for mitigation of his sentence." Under Florida law, Smalls will eventually be allowed to request another review of his sentence. He is currently imprisoned at Hardee Correctional Institution.

== See also ==
- Capital punishment in Florida
- Capital punishment in the United States
- List of people executed in Florida
- List of people executed in the United States in 2008

Preceded by William Murray	People executed in US after Baze v. Rees ruling	Succeeded by Jessie Cumming
