= Nicholas Lindsey =

American murderer

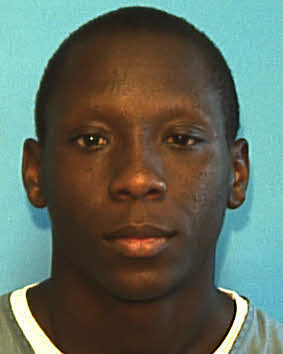
- DOC mugshot
- Born: January 18, 1995 (age 31); St. Petersburg, Florida, U.S.
- Parent(s): Nicholas Lindsey, Sr., Deneen Sweat
- Status: Incarcerated at the Blackwater Correctional Facility
- Conviction: First degree murder
- Penalty: Life imprisonment

Nicholas Lindsey (born January 18, 1995) is a Florida man convicted of murder in the first degree of a law enforcement officer from the St. Petersburg Police Department.

== Background ==
According to records, Lindsey has a prior record for non-violent crimes such as grand theft and trespassing.

Although he attended school on the day of the shooting, he had missed 40 days during the school year. Gibbs High School former principal Kevin Gordon spoke with Lindsey about cutting class. The principal and his reading intervention teacher said the teenaged suspect always complied with authority. One teacher, Karen Morse, stated that he was a typical teen who would "strive for that teacher attention to do his best." Off campus, Lindsey appeared to be a different person. Lindsey's Facebook page showed he had a gang name.

St. Petersburg mayor Bill Foster recognized Lindsey when he saw the mugshot. He met with the teen inside his home during a 2010 Outreach the Community event. It was after his first arrest for grand theft. Foster said that the teen impressed him the most and had a goal to succeed in life. Foster went on to say he wanted Lindsey tried as an adult.

== Murder of Officer David Crawford ==
On February 21, 2011, officer David Crawford, 46, was responding to a call of a suspicious person near Tropicana Field late that night. The caller stated that a man was holding a brick in his back yard and had jumped the fence. The caller thought he might be a burglar. Officer Crawford arrived to the area and spotted the person, then got out of his vehicle. At 10:37 p.m., Donald J. Ziglar, a fellow officer, noticed and reported an exchange of gunfire. Ziglar found Crawford lying near his cruiser, police stated. He was shot multiple times at close range after reaching for a notepad. More than 200 officers from different agencies across Tampa Bay poured into the city to take part in the massive manhunt for the suspect.

== Capture ==
The manhunt came to an end the night of February 22, 2011. Upon receiving tips from the community, police raided a home and arrested 16-year-old Nicholas Lindsey. Lindsey originally offered different accounts of the events, but eventually admitted information that conformed with the evidence police had already gathered, said St. Petersburg Police Chief Chuck Harmon. Police also stated that "he broke down and cried" and that Lindsey admitted to throwing the gun in a nearby creek. He was booked into the Pinellas Juvenile Assessment Center.

Lindsey's mother, Deneen Sweat, told the St. Petersburg Times she suspected her son may have been involved in the shooting after she heard the description of the suspect. "I told my son, man up and tell what happened." Deneen Sweat told WFTS. Sweat was with her son when he confessed to police.

== Public response ==
Questions were asked about how a 16-year-old could obtain a gun emerged as well as whether Nicholas Lindsey should be tried as an adult. Law enforcement took the death exceptionally hard. Crawford was described as a family man who loved horses, people and enjoyed working the night shift. He left behind a wife and a 24-year-old daughter.

My thoughts and prayers remain with the family and loved-ones of Officer Crawford during this extremely difficult time. I am hopeful that they might find some relief knowing that a suspect has been identified and is behind bars.

— Florida governor Rick Scott

It added to an already grief-stricken community. Two St. Petersburg officers died and a U.S. marshal was wounded on January 24, 2011, in a gunfight with Hydra Lacy, the brother of local boxer Jeff Lacy. The shooter in that case was also killed. St. Petersburg Mayor Bill Foster told HLN that the city will do more to teach young people that the consequences of a "bad decision" will last a lifetime.

No one prepares the city for the devastating losses we've seen this month. We're holding together with a lot of prayer, faith ... and dependence on each other.

— St. Petersburg Mayor Bill Foster

Officer Crawford was laid to rest in a locally televised ceremony on March 1. About 10,000 people, inside and outside of the church, attended.

== Official indictment and trial ==
On March 7, 2011, Lindsey was indicted by a grand jury on a murder in the first degree charge. He was moved to the Pinellas County Jail where he was housed with other juveniles facing adult charges. Under Florida law juveniles awaiting trial cannot be in sight or sound of the adult population.

Trial was set for December 12, 2011, but was later moved to March 19, 2012. Convicted of the murder, Lindsey would likely spend the rest of his life in state prison because of Florida's Law Enforcement Protection Act. He could not be sentenced to death per a 2005 U.S. Supreme Court ruling that prohibits people from being executed for crimes committed while under 18.

On December 2, 2011, judge Thane Covert ruled that Lindsey's taped confession would be admissible at trial citing that the manner in which the police officers obtained the confession was credible. Lindsey, with his parents in the interview room, had confessed to police that he killed Mr. Crawford. The defense argued that Lindsey's parents urged their son to confess by suggesting that he may receive leniency if he did. Covert also granted a motion for another trial date as defense attorney Frank McDermott stated that he would not be able to be prepared in such a short amount of time. Trial was removed from the December 12 date and replaced with a pretrial hearing. Covert said he will schedule pretrial hearings every three weeks which is something he typically does when a case of his moves slowly.

On December 12, 2011, Covert set the trial for March 19, 2012.

Jury selection began on March 19, 2012, with testimony beginning the next day. Lindsey's defense team's strategy was to convince the jury that manslaughter took place. They portrayed Lindsey as a scared youth, while prosecutors, including Pinellas-Pasco state attorney Bernie McCabe, portrayed this as an intentional murder of a law enforcement officer by mentioning the fact that he shot Crawford five times and did not miss a bullet. On March 23, Lindsey was convicted of Crawford's murder and sentenced to life in prison without the possibility of parole.

In October 2013, Lindsey's life sentence was upheld in court after an appeal.

Lindsay's results on IQ tests ranged from 77 to 86.

On January 20, 2017, Lindsey's attorneys requested for his sentence to be reduced to 40 years. However, on January 27, 2017, Lindsey's life sentence was again upheld and the judge stated that the sentence would be reviewed in 2036, after 25 years served.

Lindsey remains imprisoned in the South Bay Correctional Facility, a private state prison for men located in South Bay, operated by the GEO Group under contract with the Florida Department of Corrections.
