= Mayo Correctional Institution Annex =

State prison in Mayo, Florida, US

Coordinates: 30°07′57″N 83°18′18″W

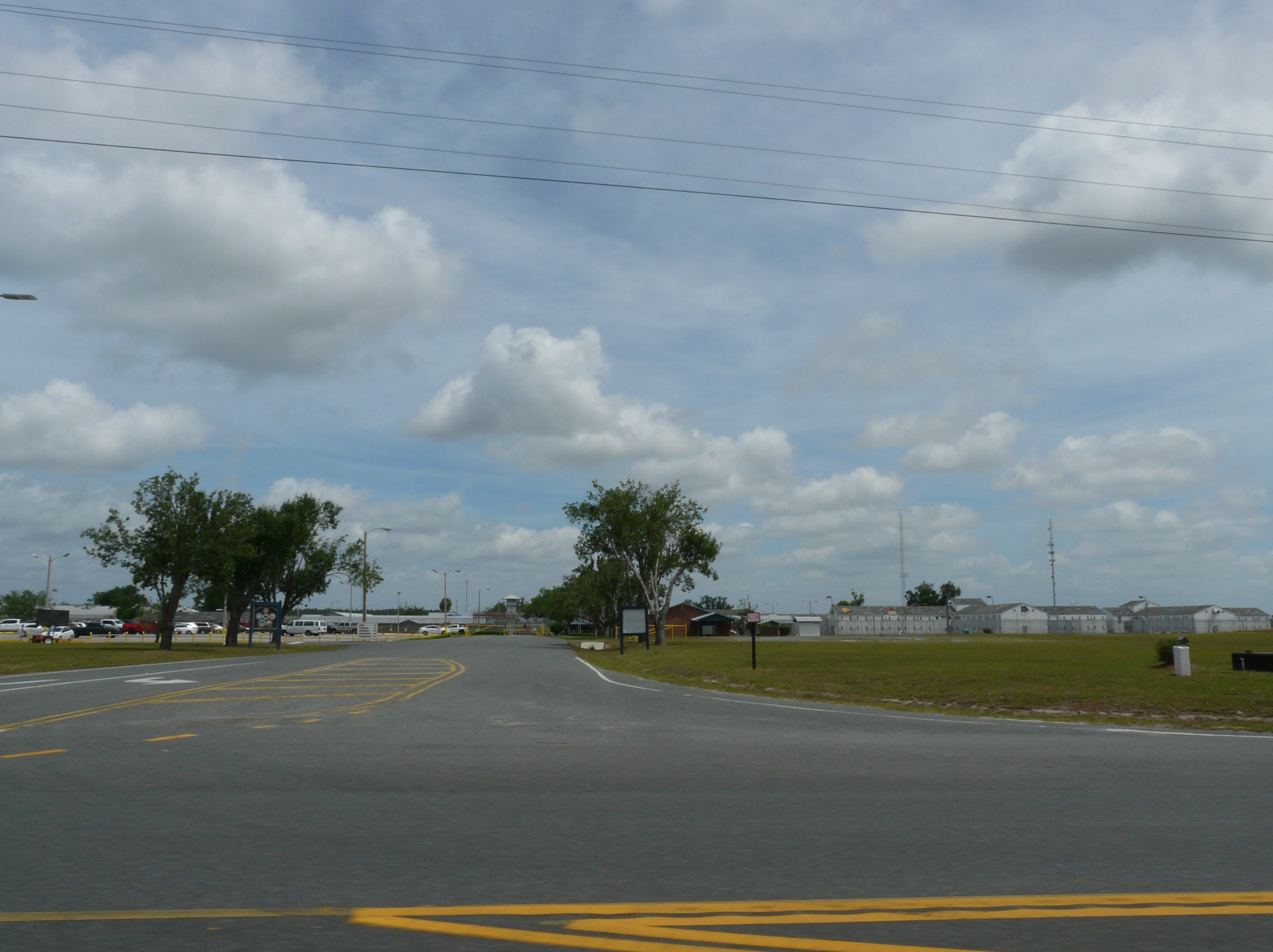
- Entrance to MAYAN
- Interactive map of Mayo Correctional Institution Annex
- Location: 8784 U.S. 27 Mayo, Florida
- Status: Operational
- Security class: Minimum, medium, and close
- Capacity: 1,345
- Population: 1,027 (August 2023)
- Opened: 1984
- Managed by: Florida Department of Corrections
- Warden: Monroe Barnes

The Mayo Correctional Institution Annex (MAYAN) is a state prison for men located in Lafayette County, Florida. It has a mix of security levels, including minimum, medium, and close, and houses adult male offenders. This facility was opened in 1984 and has a maximum capacity of 1,345 prisoners.

== History ==
The original Mayo Correctional Institution on the same property held 1668 prisoners and was closed by the state in 2012.

On June 26, 2019, two inmates allegedly attacked a correctional officer with improvised weapons. While responding to the incident, staff discovered another inmate had been killed in a separate area of the facility. The injured officer survived, only to be attacked again in January 2021 by a different inmate, sustaining multiple stab wounds. He survived the second incident as well..

== Notable Inmates ==
Inmate Name	Register Number	Status	Details
Jose Luis Del Toro Jr.	166041	Serving a life sentence.	Perpetrator of the 1997 Murder of Sheila Bellush in which he was hired by Bellush's ex-husband Allen Blackthorne to kill her.
Steven Payne	C32904	Serving a 25-year sentence	Found guilty of sexually battering Steffi Emilien with a vibrator between August 1, 2018, and February 27, 2019, while she was 17, at his sister’s house in Florida.
