= Gulf Correctional Institution =

State prison in Gulf County, Florida

Coordinates: 30°10′30″N 85°15′41″W

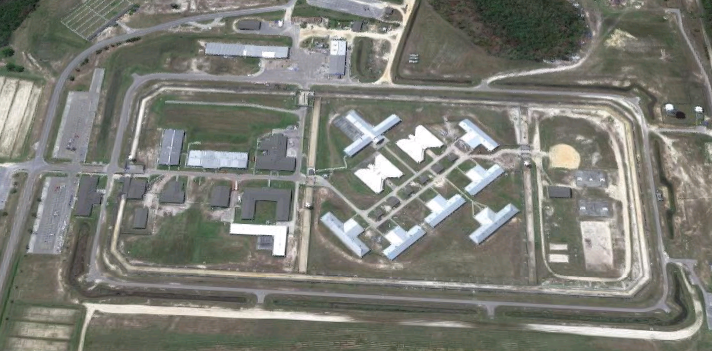
- Aerial view of GULCI
- Interactive map of Gulf Correctional Institution
- Location: 500 Ike Steele Road Wewahitchka, Florida
- Status: Operational
- Security class: Minimum, medium, and close
- Capacity: 1,411 (main unit)
- Population: 1,699 (January 2025)
- Opened: 1992
- Managed by: Florida Department of Corrections
- Warden: Jeremy Proctor

The Gulf Correctional Institution (GULCI) is a state prison for men located in Wewahitchka, Gulf County, Florida, owned and operated by the Florida Department of Corrections. With a mix of security levels including minimum, medium, and close, this facility was opened in 1992 and has a maximum capacity of 1,411 prisoners.

The Gulf Annex opened in May 1999, and holds another 720 inmates at the same security level. It was rendered temporarily uninhabitable by Hurricane Michael in October 2018. It reopened at the end of 2024.

== History ==
In 2025, the Southern Poverty Law Center released a report detailing a "culture of violence" at GULCI. Drawing on first-person accounts and public records, the report alleged pervasive staff misconduct, including excessive use of force and degrading treatment of incarcerated people, exacerbated by chronic overcrowding and understaffing. The findings contributed to broader scrutiny of conditions in Florida’s prison system and calls from advocacy groups for increased oversight and reform measures.
