= Charlotte Correctional Institution =

Prison in Punta Gorda, Florida, United States

Coordinates: 26°48′14″N 81°54′14″W

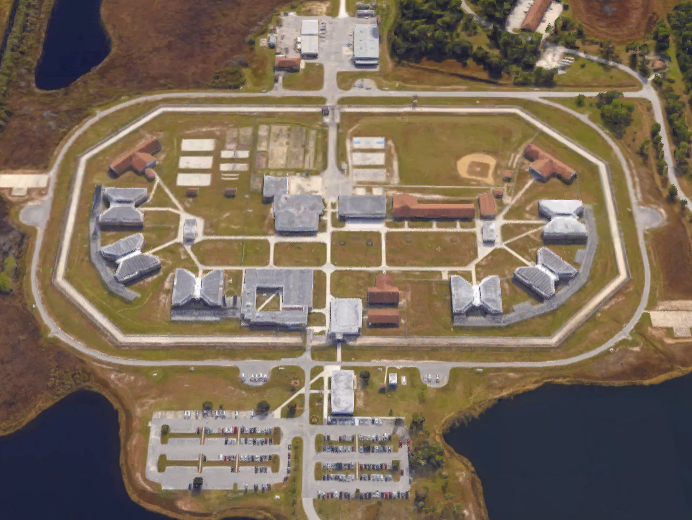
- Overhead picture
- Interactive map of Charlotte Correctional Institution
- Location: 33123 Oil Well Road Punta Gorda, Florida
- Status: Operational
- Capacity: 1,195 = 1,078 main unit + 117 satellite unit
- Population: 1,292 = 1,263 main unit + 29 satellite unit (April 15, 2025)
- Opened: 1989
- Managed by: Florida Department of Corrections
- Warden: David Carson

The Charlotte Correctional Institution is a state prison for men located in Punta Gorda, Charlotte County, Florida, owned and operated by the Florida Department of Corrections. This facility has a mix of security levels, including minimum, medium, and close, and houses adult male prisoners. Charlotte first opened in August 1989 and has a maximum capacity of 1,195 prisoners.

A 2015 grand jury report delivered a "blistering and graphic rebuke" to the department for the beating death of Charlotte inmate Matthew Walker on April 11, 2014 at the hands of guards. Reporters John Hackworth and Brian Gleason of Sun Coast Media Group were awarded the 2016 Pulitzer Prize for Editorial Writing for their reporting on Walker's death.

On June 4, 2015, inmate Robert Peterkin was discovered dead, which prison officials determined was the result of a suicide attempt the previous day. Inmate Quonta Howard was found dead on August 4, 2015; his death became the seventh ongoing criminal investigation at CCI.

== Notable Inmates ==
- Tony Ables - serial killer
- Terrence Graham - former burglar who won a Supreme Court case that banned juvenile life without parole for non homicide offenses.
- Grant Amato - Convicted for the murder of his family, where he shot his father, mother and brother in the head at their home in January 24, 2019.
