= Central Florida Reception Center =

Prison in Florida, United States

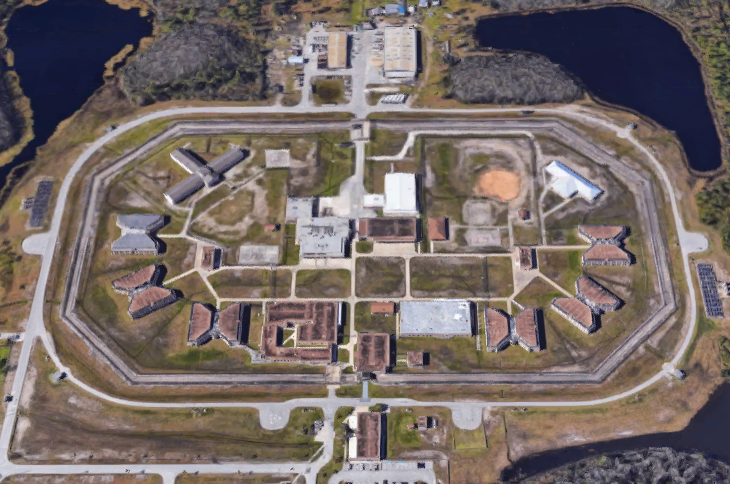
- Aerial view of Central Florida Reception Center
- Interactive map of Central Florida Reception Center
- Location: 7000 H C Kelley Rd. Orlando, Florida 32831-2518
- Status: Operational
- Security class: Minimum, medium, and close
- Capacity: 1,473
- Population: 1,708 (August 22, 2023)
- Opened: 1988
- Former name: Orange Correctional Institution
- Warden: Jess Baldridge
- Website: fdc.myflorida.com/institutions/list-of-major-institutions/320

The Central Florida Reception Center (CFRC) is a state-operated prison for men located in Orlando, Orange County, Florida, which is owned and operated by the Florida Department of Corrections. This facility was opened in 1988 as the Orange Correctional Institution and has a maximum capacity of 1,473 prisoners. It houses inmates at minimum, medium, and close security levels and serves as an inmate intake and processing center.

The Central Florida Reception Center, East Unit, is an adjacent state prison for men with capacity for another 1,407 prisoners. In addition, Central Florida Reception Center, South Unit, has a capacity for 150 inmates.

== Notable Incidents ==
In November 2025, two corrections officers beat inmate Robert Panayotis, resulting in permanent disfigurement. These officers are facing charges of aggravated battery, tampering with evidence, and use of force.
