= Apalachee Correctional Institution =

Florida State Prison in Jackson County

Coordinates: 30°42′44″N 84°53′09″W

Apalachee Correctional Institution, East Unit
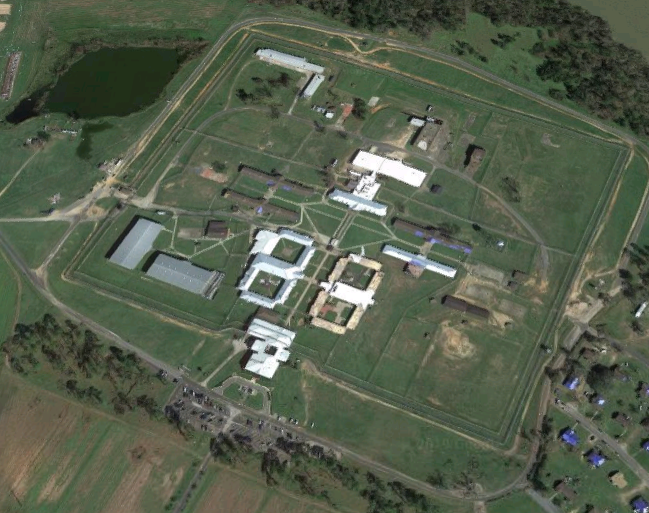
- Overhead view of Apalachee Correctional Institution, East Unit
- Interactive map of Apalachee Correctional Institution, East Unit
- Location: 35 Apalachee Drive Sneads, Florida 32460-4166
- Status: Operational
- Security class: Minimum, medium, and close
- Capacity: 1,849 = 1,169 (main unit) + 680 (satellite unit)
- Population: 1,771 = 1,065 (main unit) + 706 (satellite unit) (September 16, 2025)
- Opened: 1949
- Former name: Youthful Offender Facility of FDC
- Warden: Michael Pabis
- Website: https://www.fdc.myflorida.com/institutions/institutions-list/102

The Apalachee Correctional Institution, East Unit, is a state prison for men located in Sneads, Jackson County, Florida, owned and operated by the Florida Department of Corrections. This facility has a mix of security levels, including minimum, medium, and close, and houses adult male offenders. Apalachee Correctional Institution East Unit first opened in 1949 and has a maximum capacity of 1,849 prisoners.

In the early 1980s, less than a mile away from Apalachee Correctional Institution, East Unit, its sister/satellite institution, Apalachee Correctional Institution, West Unit, opened up; it was previously a prison labor camp run by the Florida Department of Mental Health.

== Notable Incidents ==
In January 2018, Inmate Frederick Patterson III, awaiting trial for killing a cellmate, killed inmate Scott Collinsworth, claiming he was a child molester. Patterson was already sentenced to life for a previous murder.

After Hurricane Michael made landfall in 2018, many inmates complained about the conditions they experienced during and after the storm. Reports indicated a lack of clean water, interrupted medical care, and not enough protection from the hazardous weather.
