= Raoul, Georgia =

- Unincorporated community Census-designated place
- Location in Habersham County and the state of Georgia
- Coordinates: 34°27′17″N 83°35′58″W
- Country: United States
- State: Georgia
- County: Habersham

Area
  - Total: 2.01 sq mi (5.21 km^{2})
  - Land: 2.00 sq mi (5.19 km^{2})
  - Water: 0.0077 sq mi (0.02 km^{2})
- Elevation: 1,394 ft (425 m)

Population (2020)
  - Total: 2,803
  - Density: 1,398.5/sq mi (539.95/km^{2})
- Time zone: UTC-5 (Eastern (EST))
  - Summer (DST): UTC-4 (EDT)
- ZIP code: 30510
- Area code: 706
- FIPS code: 13-63588
- GNIS feature ID: 2403460

Raoul is an unincorporated community and census-designated place (CDP) in Habersham County, Georgia, United States. As of the 2020 census, Raoul had a population of 2,803.

== Geography ==
Raoul is located in the southwest corner of Habersham County and is bordered to the northeast by the town of Alto and to the southeast by Banks County. Georgia State Route 13 (Gainesville Highway) forms the Banks County line at Raoul, and four-lane U.S. Route 23 (Tommy Irwin Parkway) forms the northwest edge of the community. Cornelia is 6 miles (10 km) to the northeast, and Gainesville is 18 miles (29 km) to the southwest.

According to the United States Census Bureau, the Raoul CDP has a total area of 2.0 square miles (5.2 km^{2}), of which 0.01 square miles (0.02 km^{2}), or 0.33%, are water.

== Demographics ==
Historical population
Census	Pop.	Note	%±
1990	1,674		—
2000	1,816		8.5%
2010	2,558		40.9%
2020	2,803		9.6%
U.S. Decennial Census; 1850-1870 1870-1880; 1890-1910 1920-1930; 1940 1950 1960; 1970 1980 1990; 2000 2010 2020

Raoul first appeared as a census designated place in the 1990 U.S. census.

=== Racial and ethnic composition ===
Raoul CDP, Georgia – Racial and ethnic composition Note: the US Census treats Hispanic/Latino as an ethnic category. This table excludes Latinos from the racial categories and assigns them to a separate category. Hispanics/Latinos may be of any race.
Race / Ethnicity (NH = Non-Hispanic)	Pop 2000	Pop 2010	Pop 2020	% 2000	% 2010	% 2020
White alone (NH)	894	1,621	1,655	49.23%	63.37%	59.04%
Black or African American alone (NH)	825	627	696	45.43%	24.51%	24.83%
Native American or Alaska Native alone (NH)	9	5	2	0.50%	0.20%	0.07%
Asian alone (NH)	7	19	8	0.39%	0.74%	0.29%
Native Hawaiian or Pacific Islander alone (NH)	0	0	0	0.00%	0.00%	0.00%
Other race alone (NH)	0	2	2	0.00%	0.08%	0.07%
Mixed race or Multiracial (NH)	21	22	40	1.16%	0.86%	1.43%
Hispanic or Latino (any race)	60	262	400	3.30%	10.24%	14.27%
Total	1,816	2,558	2,803	100.00%	100.00%	100.00%

=== 2020 census ===
As of the 2020 census, Raoul had a population of 2,803. The median age was 35.6 years. 10.8% of residents were under the age of 18 and 6.0% of residents were 65 years of age or older. For every 100 females there were 25.0 males, and for every 100 females age 18 and over there were 19.6 males age 18 and over.

88.3% of residents lived in urban areas, while 11.7% lived in rural areas.

There were 364 households in Raoul, of which 33.5% had children under the age of 18 living in them. Of all households, 53.3% were married-couple households, 17.0% were households with a male householder and no spouse or partner present, and 23.9% were households with a female householder and no spouse or partner present. About 23.7% of all households were made up of individuals and 12.6% had someone living alone who was 65 years of age or older.

There were 404 housing units, of which 9.9% were vacant. The homeowner vacancy rate was 2.1% and the rental vacancy rate was 11.6%.

=== 2010 census ===
As of the census of 2010, there were 2,558 people, 348 households, and 262 families residing in the CDP. The population density was 1,266.3 inhabitants per square mile (488.9/km^{2}). There were 405 housing units at an average density of 200.5 per square mile (77.4/km^{2}). The racial makeup of the CDP was 66.8% White, 24.6% African American, 0.4% Native American, 0.7% Asian, 6.0% from other races, and 1.4% from two or more races. Hispanic or Latino of any race were 10.2% of the population.

There were 405 households, out of which 35.6% had children under the age of 18 living with them, 54.3% were married couples living together, 14.4% had a female householder with no husband present, and 24.7% were non-families. 20.1% of all households were made up of individuals, and 6.3% had someone living alone who was 65 years of age or older. The average household size was 2.91 and the average family size was 3.36.

In the CDP, the population was spread out, with 13.1% under the age of 20, 8.83% from 20 to 24, 49.2% from 25 to 44, 24.5% from 45 to 64, and 4.3% who were 65 years of age or older. The median age was 36.1 years. Raoul has the highest percentage of females found in any U.S. city. Females made up 80.6% of the population, and 86.9% of the population from ages 20 to 64 were female.

=== Demographic notes ===
This imbalance is caused by there being over a thousand women at Lee Arrendale State Prison, an all women's prison (since 2005) whose address although listed as Alto, GA actually is within the limits of Raoul.

=== 2000 census ===
As of the 2000 census, the median income for a household was $35,192, and the median income for a family was $36,538. Males had a median income of $25,313 versus $18,750 for females. The per capita income for the CDP was $6,871. About 14.4% of families and 18.7% of the population were below the poverty line, including 25.3% of those under age 18 and 15.8% of those age 65 or over.

== Government and infrastructure ==
Georgia Department of Corrections Lee Arrendale State Prison is in Raoul.

== Education ==
All of Habersham County is served by the Habersham County School District.
