= The State of Texas vs. Melissa =

- Directed by: Cyril Thoma; Sabrina Van Tassel
- Written by: Sabrina Van Tassel
- Produced by: Philippe de Bourbon; Isaac Sharry; Sabrina Van Tassel
- Starring: Norma Jean Farley; Peter Gilman; Bobby Lucio; Daniella Lucio; Diane Lucio; Esperanza Lucio; Melissa Lucio; Rene Lucio
- Cinematography: Cyril Thomas
- Edited by: Damien Bois
- Music by: Christophe Lapinta
- Production company: Vito Films
- Distributed by: Alba Films; FilmRise
- Release date: April 21, 2020 (Tribeca)
- Running time: 102 min.
- Countries: France; United States
- Languages: English; Spanish; French

State of Texas vs. Melissa is a 2020 French-American documentary by Sabrina Van Tassel. The documentary follows the case of Melissa Lucio, a Texan woman who was the first woman of Hispanic descent in Texas to be sentenced to death. It was selected for the Tribeca Film Festival in 2020 and won best documentary at the Raindance Film Festival. As of 2026, Lucio has been incarcerated on death row for 19 years, having been convicted of the physical abuse and murder of her youngest daughter, Mariah Alvarez. The rights were acquired by Hulu for streaming in the US.

== Background ==
On February 17, 2007, paramedics were called to a residence, where an unresponsive two-year-old child, who later died, was found. The child's mother, Melissa Lucio, was arrested and convicted of murder due to evidence of abuse. A 2011 appeal against the conviction was denied. However, due to trial court interference in the accused's right to present a defense, the sentence was unanimously overturned in 2019 by a three-judge panel of the Federal Appeals Court. However, the full court in 2021 ruled that the conviction had to be upheld for procedural reasons "despite the difficult issue of the exclusion of testimony that might have cast doubt on the credibility of Lucio's confession," and the death sentence was upheld.

In January 2022, Cameron County officials signed an execution warrant for Lucio, scheduled for April 27, 2022. On April 25, 2022, the Texas Court of Appeals granted a stay in Lucio's case and remanded it back to trial court. The court found merit in four of Lucio's claims for clemency.

In 2024, District Judge Arturo Nelson declared Lucio "actually innocent" and in the rulings stated suggested that her case be overturned. Judge Nelson found that prosecution team after the stay in Lucio's case in 2022, critical evidence was suppressed from the defense during trial.

Lucio remains on death row today.

== Reception ==
The documentary received overall positive feedback, with an 83% score on Rotten Tomatoes.

== See also ==
- List of death row inmates in the United States
- List of people scheduled to be executed in the United States
- List of women on death row in the United States
