= Melissa Lucio =

American convicted murderer (born 1969)

Melissa Elizabeth Lucio
- Born: June 18, 1969 (age 57); Lubbock, Texas, U.S.
- Citizenship: Texas resident
- Spouse: Robert Antonio Alvarez
- Status: On death row
- Conviction: Capital murder
- Penalty: Death (stay of execution issued on April 25, 2022)

Melissa Elizabeth Lucio (born June 18, 1969) is an American woman who was convicted of capital murder after the death of her two-year-old daughter, Mariah Alvarez, who was found to have scattered bruising in various stages of healing, and injuries to her head as well as contusions of the kidneys, lungs and spinal cord. Prosecutors said that Mariah's injuries were the result of physical abuse, while Lucio's attorneys say that her death was caused by falling down the stairs two days prior in the family's previous residence. Lucio is the first woman of Latina descent to be sentenced to death in the U.S. state of Texas.

Lucio's case was the subject of a 2020 documentary, The State of Texas vs. Melissa. She has maintained her innocence since she was first accused, and Cornell Law School professor Sandra Babcock has called the prosecution "by far the weakest capital case I've ever seen." Lucio's execution was set for April 27, 2022, but the Texas Court of Criminal Appeals court granted her a stay on April 25, 2022.

== Early life ==
Melissa Lucio was born in Lubbock, Texas, on June 18, 1969, according to court records. Her father died when she was still an infant, and the family moved to the Rio Grande Valley, where her mother grew up, when she was a toddler. Lucio says that she was sexually abused by her mother's boyfriend for approximately two years, beginning when she was only seven years old. Lucio was married young at the age of 16, and had her first five children with Guadalupe Lucio. She has stated that he was often addicted to drugs and alcohol and that he was physically abusive. Lucio then had seven more children with Robert Alvarez. She then had two more children (twins) while she was imprisoned.

== Death of Mariah Alvarez ==
Mariah Alvarez was born to Melissa Lucio and Robert Alvarez in September 2004. Mariah was Lucio's twelfth and youngest child. Child Protective Services had previously investigated Lucio for allegations of child neglect, and they reported that Lucio's younger children were often left in the care of their teenaged siblings. Lucio was addicted to cocaine and tested positive shortly after Mariah was born; this prompted authorities to place her children in foster care. Three older children went to live in Houston with their father, and Lucio regained custody of the other children in late 2006.

On February 17, 2007, the paramedics were called to the Lucio residence because two-year-old Mariah was found unresponsive and she was not breathing. The child was then pronounced dead at a local hospital. According to the Cameron County District Attorney's Office, Mariah had been found in her home with signs of physical abuse on her body, including marks on her back, missing patches of hair, and a fracture in her arm. According to Lucio, Mariah had sustained the injuries when she fell down a flight of stairs two days earlier. It was later determined that Mariah's arm had been broken approximately two to seven weeks before her death, and an autopsy also showed she had a head injury and bruising of her kidneys, lungs and spinal cord.

=== Interrogations ===
Following the death of Mariah, Lucio was arrested and questioned for a total of five hours by Texas Ranger Victor Escalon without a lawyer present, and without receiving food or water. She admitted to having spanked Mariah, but denied ever having abused her, which she repeated more than one hundred times. She was then told by Escalon: "Right now, it looks like you're a cold-blooded killer. Now, are you a cold-blooded killer or were you a frustrated mother who just took it out on [Mariah]?" He continued by telling her, "We already know what happened." After several hours of interrogation, Lucio stated, "I guess I did it. I'm responsible." Melissa confessed afterwards to biting and beating Mariah in the past as well as pinching Mariah's genitals, but she still denied causing the fatal head injury. This confession has later been supported by accounts given by Mariah's siblings who reported seeing their mother often pinching and hitting their sister.

One of Lucio's sons was also questioned by law enforcement shortly after Mariah's death. In a video, a female officer asks him, "Did you see your sister fall down the stairs, or did somebody tell you that she fell?" The boy then responded, "No, I saw her fall."

== Legal proceedings ==
During the trial, Lucio's recorded statements from her interrogation were described as a confession by Cameron County District Attorney Armando Villalobos, who was seeking re-election at the time. A pathologist, Dr. Norma J. Farley, testified that the child's autopsy indicated that she did not die from falling down stairs, but instead her injuries were consistent with a death from blunt force trauma. Additionally, court documents stated that the emergency room physician said he had not seen a case of child abuse worse than Mariah's.

Lucio's defense argued that Mariah's injuries were from falling down the stairs, and that Lucio's psychological functioning contributed to her conflicting reports given to authorities. Lucio's lawyer did not dispute that she was guilty of abusing her daughter, only the prosecution's claim that Lucio had murdered her:

"Now, in the opening remarks that we made in the beginning of the trial after you were all seated here, I told you my client is not up for 'Mother Of The Year.' I told you that my client is guilty of injury to a child. She is and she has admitted that. The question here before you is whether or not on February 17, 2007, Melissa Lucio intentionally and knowingly killed Mariah Alvarez. That's the issue. That's the issue. Not whether she beat her. Not whether she broke her arm. Not whether she's a lousy mother or didn't provide for her children. That's not an issue. The issue is whether or not she killed Mariah on the 17th of February, 2007."

Her defense was rejected and she was found guilty of capital murder and was sentenced to death in 2008.

=== Post-conviction ===
Lucio was pregnant with her twins at the time of Mariah's death, and authorities compelled her to place them for adoption after delivering them while in jail. As of 2022, Lucio is incarcerated on death row at the Patrick O'Daniel Unit in Gatesville, Texas.

A 2011 appeal against the conviction was denied by the Texas Court of Criminal Appeals. In 2019, a three-judge panel of the Federal Appeals Court overturned the sentence and ordered a retrial because the trial court's interference in Lucio's right to present a defense. This decision was subsequently overturned in an en banc hearing of the same court, and Lucio remained on death row.

Forensic pathologist Dr. Thomas Young, the former chief medical examiner in Kansas City, Missouri, reviewed the case at the request of Lucio's post-conviction attorney. He concluded that Dr. Farley appeared to have jumped to the wrong conclusions. In the similar case of Manuel Velez, a man who was initially convicted for murdering a one-year-old baby and whose death sentence was overturned after further investigation was conducted, Farley's conclusions in that trial had also been contradicted by other medical experts.

In August 2021, an amicus brief was filed on Lucio's behalf by a group consisting of legal scholars, experts on violence against women, and representatives from sixteen organizations that combat violence against women. The brief states that Lucio's subdued behavior and acquiescence during interrogation were the result of her prior trauma as a survivor of abuse. They also argued that a judge's order to exclude expert testimony on the effects of trauma had "deprived Melissa of the only means she had of explaining that, notwithstanding her demeanor and self-incriminating statements, she was innocent of her daughter's murder."

In January 2022, Cameron County officials signed an execution warrant for Lucio. She was scheduled for her execution on April 27, 2022. In January of 2022, the Innocence Project joined Melissa Lucio's legal team. She then petitioned for clemency. If a majority of the Board of Pardons and Paroles recommended it, Governor Greg Abbott could grant clemency. The parole board had been scheduled to vote on Lucio's clemency petition two days before the execution. In a March 2022 letter to the Board of Pardons and Paroles and to Governor Abbott, eighty-three members of the Texas House of Representatives, including both Democrats and Republicans, signed a letter stating that executing Lucio would be "a miscarriage of justice."

In April 2022, a juror on the trial, Johnny Galvan Jr., wrote in the Houston Chronicle that he had wrongly succumbed to peer pressure during deliberations and that he had changed his vote from a life sentence to the death penalty. The Mexican Ambassador to the United States, Esteban Moctezuma, announced on April 22 that he sent a letter to Governor Abbott asking him to grant executive clemency for Lucio, as "Mexico has historically manifested an unwavering commitment in its opposition to the death penalty."

On April 25, 2022, the Texas Court of Criminal Appeals issued a stay of execution and ordered the 138th Judicial District Court of Cameron County to consider new evidence of Lucio's innocence in the abuse and death of her daughter.

During the subsequent hearings, the District Attorney's office admitted that exculpatory evidence had been withheld during the trial, including the fact that witnesses saw Melissa's daughter, Mariah, fall down the stairs and were aware of her deteriorating condition in the days following her fall. Both sides had requested the court to overturn Lucio's conviction. In April 2024, District Judge Arturo Nelson, the judge who presided over Lucio's original trial, recommended that she be given a new trial based on the prosecutorial misconduct. In October 2024, Judge Nelson further concluded that Melissa "is actually innocent; she did not kill her daughter." The case was then sent back to the Court of Criminal Appeals (CCA) for a final decision, and it then remained pending for two years. On September 24, 2026, the CCA denied Lucio's appeal by a 5–4 majority decision, stating that Judge Nelson's findings "exclusively reflect Applicant’s interpretation of the evidence and are often unsupported". The majority opinion held that Mariah Alvarez's injuries were too extensive to have been caused by a fall down the stairs, noting that her blood disorder did not explain many of her injuries, such as scratches and an apparent bite mark on her back. Lucio's lawyers said they would appeal the decision to the U.S. Supreme Court, including Vanessa Potkin who stated, "Between Judge Nelson’s detailed findings of innocence, and District Attorney [Luis] Saenz’s concession of error, we are confident that the courts will clear Melissa Lucio and allow her to return home to her children and grandchildren".

== In popular culture ==
A 2020 documentary by Sabrina Van Tassel titled The State of Texas vs. Melissa follows Lucio's case. It played at the Tribeca Film Festival in 2020, and won best documentary at the Raindance Film Festival.

On March 6, 2022, in the main segment of an episode of the HBO show Last Week Tonight with John Oliver called "Wrongful Convictions," her case was the main one to be discussed as a reason for the reform of the justice system in the United States and specifically, the abolition of the Antiterrorism and Effective Death Penalty Act of 1996 (AEDPA). On April 17, 2022, in the main segment of another episode "Police Interrogations," the show mentions Lucio's case again as having every major attribute of a false confession.

== See also ==
- List of death row inmates in the United States
- List of women on death row in the United States
