= 2014 Cedarville Rancheria tribal office shooting =

Mass shooting in California, US

- Location: 41.4839°N 120.5452°W; Cedarville Rancheria tribal headquarters 300 W 1st St; Alturas, California, US
- Date: February 20, 2014
- Attack type: Mass shooting; mass murder; familicide; stabbing
- Weapons: 9mm Lorcin semi-automatic pistol; 9mm Taurus semi-automatic pistol; Knife
- Deaths: 4
- Injuries: 2
- Perpetrator: Cherie Lash Rhoades
- Motive: Tribe's attempt to evict her from her tribal home
- Verdict: Death (Note: Reduced to life imprisonment in November 2026)
- Convictions: First-degree murder with special circumstances (4 counts); Attempted murder (2 counts)

On February 20, 2014, a stabbing attack and mass shooting occurred at Cedarville Rancheria's tribal headquarters in Alturas, California, United States. 44-year-old Cherie Lash Rhoades, a recently ousted tribal chairwoman, was attending an eviction hearing at the office against her and her son when she opened fire with two handguns, killing four people, including three people from her family, and wounding two others. After one of her handguns jammed, she used a knife from the office kitchen to stab one of the already wounded victims and attempt to stab another victim.

In April 2017, Rhoades was sentenced to death for the murders. In November 2026, Rhoades had her death sentence, along with all other California death row inmates, commuted by California governor Gavin Newsom, and reduced to life in prison.

== Background and embezzlement investigation ==
The Cedarville Rancheria is a federally recognized tribe based in Cedarville which had 35 registered members at the time of the shooting. The Rancheria are a branch of the Northern Paiute people.

The Rancheria owned 26 acres of land on the outskirts of Cedarville, California, where 14 adult members of the tribe lived and received more than $80,000 annually from casino profits. Although the Rancheria did not own or operate a casino, the tribe received $1.1 million in gambling revenue from casino-operating tribes. The members resided in nine small houses clustered around a small playground. The tribe also owned a gas station and mini-mart business called Rabbit Traxx. In mid-2009, the tribe purchased the building where the headquarters would eventually be located in a residential area of Alturas, located a block away from the Alturas Police Department. The headquarters also had a daycare center.

Cherie Rhoades was the tribal chairwoman and her son was a vice chairman when the pair were ousted from their positions three weeks prior to the attack after coming under federal investigation for embezzling at least $50,000 from the tribe. As a result of her removal, Rhoades would lose $15,000 to $20,000 in quarterly benefits. In 2012, the tribe received $50,399 from the US Department of Housing and Urban Development for tribal housing, although it was not confirmed if the grant was part of the embezzlement scheme. The Rancheria did not have its own court system, and in order to conduct Rhoades and her son's hearing, the tribe contracted an attorney and judge to conduct the proceedings.

== Attack ==
The day before the shooting, Cherie Rhoades asked two of her nephews to clean her two semi-automatic 9mm handguns. Rhoades had acquired one of the guns as a Mother's Day gift from her husband, and she had never fired either prior to the shooting. Rhoades told her nephews that she was planning on going target shooting above the Rancheria in Cedarville or selling the guns to a friend.

On the day of the attack, Rhoades and her son were due to attend a tribal hearing at Cedarville Rancheria's headquarters in Alturas, where the tribe would decide whether the pair would be evicted from tribal housing and lose $80,000 in annual payouts from gambling revenue. Rhoades met her son and his family at a local Subway in Alturas, where her son told her that he would not be attending the eviction hearing at the advice of his attorney. While at the Subway, Rhoades' nephew called her and told her that the tribe had hired a judge, the first time that the tribe had ever done so in its history, and according to one of the survivors of the shooting, the judge had been hired to avoid directly confronting Rhoades' "dominating personality". Patricia Lenzi was the judge that had been hired, and she was a member of the St. Regis Mohawk Tribe of New York, and a California licensed attorney and tribal judge in Arizona and New York. Lenzi had suggested to the Rancheria to delay the hearing so that she could attend the hearing in-person, but the tribe denied the request, and she instead took part in the hearing via speaker phone. Rhoades' son hugged her and told her that he had an appointment at a health center and that he'd see her after the meeting.

Glenn Calonico, one of Rhoades' nephews, had shown one of Rhoades' nieces just prior to the start of the hearing a letter in which he alleged that Rhoades had abused one of his children. Inside the conference room of the tribal headquarters where the eviction hearing would be held, a belated baby shower had taken place for 19-year-old Angel Penn and her newborn son. As such, the conference room was filled with baby shower-related items and gifts. Rhoades concealed the handguns in the pockets of her shorts outside the tribal headquarters and smoked cigarettes and drank coffee while waiting outside to be invited in for the hearing. One of her nephews gave her an envelope which contained her appeal about her ousting and she was told that it had been denied and told to wait outside.

After returning from inside, the nephew told Rhoades that they were ready for her, and she entered without being checked for weapons. Rhoades' son, who had a concealed weapon permit, had been searched for weapons the previous time he visited the headquarters. Rhoades first entered the staff bathroom, before entering the conference room where the hearing would be held. After entering, Rhoades braced a knee against the "defense chair" and said she was cold, and told someone to close the windows facing the street. Everyone in attendance, except for the nephew who had invited her inside and given her the envelope, was sat at the conference table. Lenzi began the hearing and asked Rhoades several questions. After Lenzi said that there was no way for Rhoades to appeal her eviction, Rhoades claimed there was a provision in the tribal constitution which said that she could appeal to the community council if she was evicted by the executive committee. According to the tribe's constitution, a member could only appeal to the community council if they were dis-enrolled from the tribe.

After this verbal dispute between Lenzi and Rhoades, she stood up and leaned over to her brother Rurik Davis, and Davis leaned over to her. Rhoades then took out a handgun and shot Davis in the head once, killing him. After shooting Davis, Rhoades opened fire at others who were sat at the conference table. As she shot, Rhoades yelled that she wasn't going to let anyone leave the room alive. Rhoades shot Penn once in the chest, fatally wounding her, and Penn fell over her son, shielding him from Rhoades. Rhoades also shot Calonico and Sheila Russo, a non-Native who worked at the office. Russo had grabbed a member of the tribe and thrown them to the floor to protect them before she was shot in the back of the head and landed on top of them. Russo was not instantly killed, and the survivor underneath her recalled hearing her gasping for breath before dying.

Rhoades' first gun jammed, and she fetched a knife from the headquarters' kitchen, which she used to attempt to stab one of the wounded victims, who had been shot four times and was hiding underneath the conference table. The wounded victim prevented Rhoades from stabbing her, but suffered cuts to her hands. After attempting to stab one of the victims, Rhoades then used her other gun to fatally shoot the wounded Calonico, who pleaded with Rhoades to stop, and she shot him repeatedly, eventually killing him with two shots to the chest. As Rhoades shot Calonico, the victim who Rhoades had attempted to stab fled the conference room. Another wounded victim had escaped earlier after being shot once and evading Rhoades around a pillar.

An uninjured female survivor, who was covered in blood, escaped past Rhoades and ran two blocks to Alturas city hall (which also served as the headquarters of the police station). A city employee who was present when the survivor ran into city hall said that the woman screamed for help upon entering the building and told them that another woman had opened fire and was indiscriminately shooting people. She and another employee then ran down a hallway to the police station to inform law enforcement. The tribe's environmental resource coordinator had been monitoring the cameras positioned throughout the headquarters when Rhoades opened fire, and he tackled Rhoades and held her down until police officers arrived on scene and took her into custody.

== Victims ==
A total of four people, three of whom were Rhoades' family members, were killed in the attack, including one who was also stabbed, and two others were wounded. 50-year-old Rurik Davis was Rhoades' brother and was serving as interim tribal chairman when he was killed with a single shot to the head. Rhoades also killed her 19-year-old niece, Angel Penn, with a single shot to the chest. Penn was holding her newborn baby on her lap, who was uninjured in the attack, when she was shot. Rhoades' 30-year-old nephew, Glenn Calonico, was shot eight times and stabbed once, including two shots to the chest that caused his death. Also killed was 47-year-old tribal administrator Sheila Russo, the only non-Native victim, who was shot twice and killed by a gunshot wound to the head.

The two surviving injured victims were identified as two of Rhoades' other nieces, who were shot four times and once respectively. Rhoades also attempted to stab the surviving niece who had been shot multiple times.

== Perpetrator ==
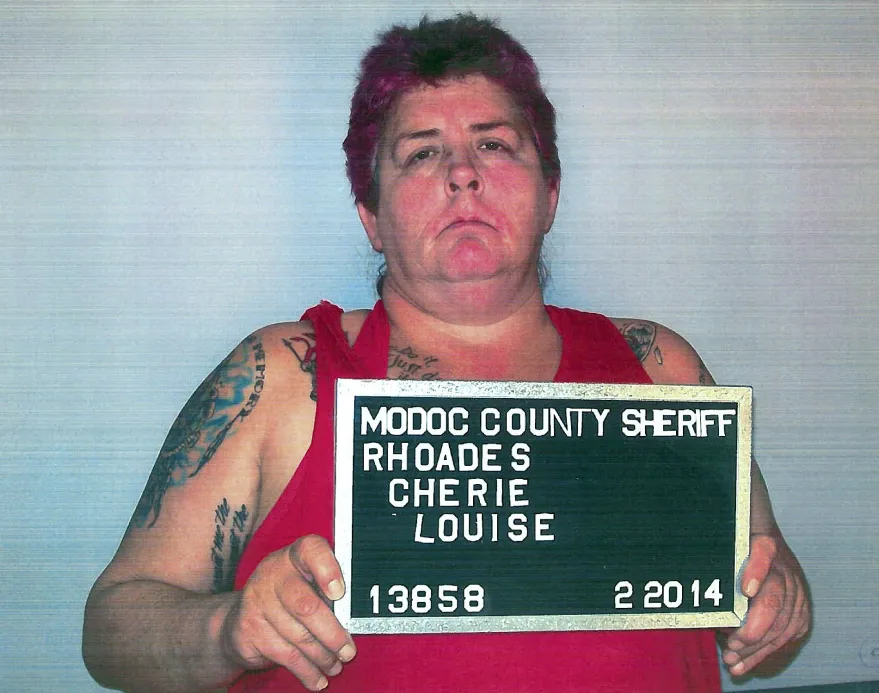
Mug shot of Rhoades after her arrest

Cherie Lash Rhoades (born December 13, 1969) was raised off-reservation in the Sacramento metropolitan area as the youngest of five children. Rhoades and her siblings were not raised with tribal culture. Rhoades' mother, Virginia Sweeney, dropped out of school in eighth grade and had her first child when she was 16 years old. When Rhoades was 11-years-old, she was raped by a 23-year-old man. The rape was not reported, and she eventually had a three-year relationship with the man. Rhoades was expelled from ninth grade after hitting a teacher who refused to let her play volleyball, and she was transferred to an alternative school, where she struggled academically.

At age 21, Rhoades earned a general education diploma (GED) and had her first son with a man who was around thirty years older than her and married. After earning her GED, Rhoades became briefly homeless before moving in with her parents. Sometime after moving in with her parents, she entered into a relationship with a man who was 42 years older than her, and after nine years together they married. In 1993, after her mother moved to Cedarville Rancheria, she and her husband joined her at the ranchería, with her brother Rurik Davis and his family moving to the reservation the following year. After Davis became chair of the executive committee of the tribe, he attempted to dis-enroll Rhoades, their mother, and a half-brother. The attempt failed, and Rhoades said that the incident left her with intense resentment towards Davis, and that, "When my mother's feelings get hurt, it doesn't make me very happy".

Rhoades worked her way into the tribe's leadership. Rhoades eventually became the leader of the tribe and worked at the tribe's gas station and convenience store in Cedarville, where she often wore bright tank tops and showed off her tattoos. A sister of one of the victims said that Rhoades liked to joke, but said that "you did not want to get on her bad side" and that Rhoades had a "powerful personality". A resident of the Rancheria said that Rhoades "bullied her way through life", but that she would never have believed Rhoades was capable of such an attack. Rhoades' husband, daughter, and grandson reported hearing her make threats about hurting those who had accused her of embezzling funds, with her husband reporting that she had specifically heard Rhoades threaten to shoot her accusers, but he said that he didn't believe her at the time. Alturas police chief Ken Barnes said that Rhoades was known to his department, but that she had never been arrested by his officers before the shooting. Barnes also said that Rhoades was known to be "difficult".

== Legal proceedings ==
Alturas police chief Ken Barnes said that Rhoades spoke briefly to police before requesting a lawyer. Rhoades was held without bail following her arrest. On February 25, 2014, Rhoades made her first court appearance for arraignment hearings, where she wore a bulletproof vest during the proceedings at Modoc County Superior Court, and the arraignment hearings were continued until March 3 at the defense's request. On March 3, Rhoades was charged with four counts of murder and two counts of premeditated attempted murder. Rhoades pleaded not guilty, and district attorney Jordan Funk said that the state hadn't made a decision whether to pursue the death penalty or not.

On July 9, Rhoades faced Modoc County judge John T. Ball for a preliminary hearing. During the hearing, surveillance footage video of the attack was played by Funk, and Rhoades reacted by holding her head in her hands and putting her elbows on the defense table. Ball ordered a jury trial and scheduled her arraignment for August 13. On November 10, prosecutors announced their intention to pursue the death penalty. Rhoades' defense attorney, Antonio Alvarez, said he was not surprised by the announcement. In February 2015, Rhoades' trial was moved out of Modoc County, but she was scheduled to appear in front of Ball again on March 18 so that he could schedule her trial.

In December 2016, Rhoades was convicted of all charges by a Placer County jury, after her trial had been delayed by the death of Ball on November 10, 2015. After Ball's death, he was replaced by judge Candice Beason. On January 5, 2017, after about three and a half hours of deliberation, the jury voted in favor of the death penalty. On April 10, just before Rhoades' sentencing, Alvarez filed a motion for a new trial, saying that Barnes' testimony during the trial was "false". Funk said that Alvarez's request was a "tempest in a teapot", and Beason denied the motion. During Rhoades' sentencing, Beason described Rhoades' actions as "intentional, premeditated, and willful", and also green-lighted $64,874 in restitution payments to the victims pending future discussions with Alvarez and Funk. Multiple members of the tribe were also present during the sentencing.

On November 5, 2026, Rhoades' death sentence, along with all the sentences of other death row inmates in California, was commuted by California governor Gavin Newsom. Rhoades' sentence was subsequently downgraded to life imprisonment.

== Aftermath ==
The Bureau of Indian Affairs (BIA) deployed grief counselors to Alturas after the shooting. After the shooting, Cedarville Rancheria created an interim government, with Brandi Penn installed as temporary chair. Cedarville Rancheria's health center, of which Shelia Russo had been on the board, remained active after the shooting, and the center released a statement saying that their "focus has been to provide services to meet the needs of its clients, who have been affected by the terrible loss of life".

== Reactions ==
US president Barack Obama wrote letters offering his condolences to the families who had lost family members in the attack, several of whom had been present during the shooting. The mayor of Alturas, John Dederick, said that the tribe "pretty much lost their leadership yesterday" and that even though other shootings had happened in small communities, that no one had "anticipated something like this here".

=== Native American reaction ===
The National Congress of American Indians president, Brian Cladoosby, released a statement that said: "A great sorrow stretches across Indian Country for the heartbreaking tragedy in the Cedarville Rancheria community. I know that the country is joining us in prayer for the victims, their families, and the tribe as they gather their strength to walk together during this time." The assistant secretary to the head of the BIA, Kevin K. Washburn, said in a press release that "Tribes are, by necessity, very resilient, and we are confident that the Cedarville Rancheria will survive this tragedy".

== See also ==
- Contemporary Native American issues in the United States
- Crime in California
- List of death row inmates in the United States § California
- List of women on death row in the United States
- Mass shootings in the United States
- 2005 Red Lake shootings, another mass shooting affecting a Native American tribe
