= Cynthia Coffman (murderer) =

American murderer (born 1962)

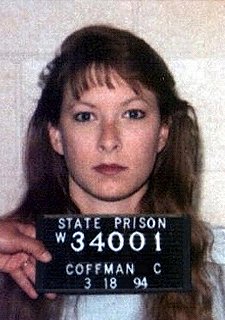
- Mug shot of Coffman
- Born: January 19, 1962 (age 64); St. Louis, Missouri, U.S.
- Convictions: First degree murder with special circumstances (2 counts); Aggravated kidnapping Kidnapping (2 counts); Forcible sodomy Robbery (2 counts); Burglary (2 counts)
- Penalty: Death

Details
- Victims: 4
- Span of crimes: October – November 1986
- Country: United States
- State: California
- Date apprehended: November 14, 1986

Cynthia Lynn Coffman (born January 19, 1962) is an American serial killer convicted in the 1986 deaths of two women in California. She was convicted along with her boyfriend, James Gregory Marlow. Coffman admits to being present at the murders but insists she suffered from battered woman syndrome. She was sentenced to death and is sitting on death row in Central California Women's Facility.

== Background ==
Coffman was born in St. Louis, Missouri. After her father left her family, she was raised by her mother. Coffman's mother attempted to give her and her brothers away at one point. By age 18, Coffman married and became a mother, but the marriage did not last long. She moved to Arizona with a friend and met Marlow shortly after he was released from jail. They began to use methamphetamine together, got married, and began to commit violent crimes.

== Crimes ==
Coffman and Marlow were accused of kidnapping and killing four women in October and November 1986.

- Sandra Neary (32) on October 11, 1986 from Costa Mesa, California
- Pamela Simmons (35) on October 28, 1986 from Bullhead City, Arizona
- Corinna Novis (20) on November 7, 1986 from Redlands, California
- Lynel Murray (19) on November 12, 1986 from Huntington Beach, California

They were arrested on November 14, 1986, following which Coffman confessed to the murders. Coffman's attorneys say that she loved Marlow but that he battered, brainwashed, and starved her, so she did not run from Marlow when the crime spree began. In addition to the California murders, Coffman and Marlow are also believed to have carried out the July 7, 1986 slaying of 28-year-old Gregory Hill in Whitley City, Kentucky.

== Trial and punishment ==
They were put on trial in July 1989 and in 1990 sentenced to death. Coffman was the first woman to receive a death sentence in California since the reinstatement of the death penalty in that state in 1977. A trial in 1992 convicted her of another murder, for which she received a sentence of life imprisonment.

== See also ==
- List of death row inmates in the United States
- List of serial killers in the United States
- List of women on death row in the United States
