= Murder of Ame Deal =

American murder victim (2000–2011)

Ame Lynn Deal
- Born: Ame Lynn Deal; July 24, 2000; Monongahela, Pennsylvania, U.S.
- Died: July 12, 2011 (aged 10); Phoenix, Arizona, U.S.
- Cause of death: Murder by suffocation
- Known for: Child murder and abuse victim

Ame Lynn Deal (July 24, 2000 – July 12, 2011) was an American 10-year-old girl who was murdered in Phoenix, Arizona, in July 2011. Deal had been the victim of long-term abuse by her family members before being locked inside a footlocker, where she subsequently died from suffocation. Sammantha and John Allen were convicted in 2017 of first degree murder and sentenced to death by lethal injection, while Sammantha Allen's mother, Cynthia Stoltzmann, arranged a plea deal with prosecutors and was sentenced to 24 years in prison.

== Biography ==
=== Personal life ===
Ame Lynn Deal was born in Monongahela, Pennsylvania, on July 24, 2000, to Shirley Deal, who was married to David Deal at the time she conceived. According to Shirley, she was seeing another man during the time she conceived, therefore it is not known for sure if David Deal is the father of Ame. However, David Deal is listed as Ame's father on her birth certificate. Shirley and David had two other children together before Ame was born. Shirley and David were living together until Shirley and her children went to stay with her mother in Donora, Pennsylvania. Eventually Shirley and the children joined David again and they lived in Midland, Texas, together with David's mother, Judith Deal, and his sister, Cynthia Stoltzmann. Shirley claims that while David's family made her a slave to them, called her names and hit her, they did not abuse the children. Shirley claims also that the family threw her out and she left without her children, relocating to Iola, Kansas.

=== Abuse ===
Neighbors claimed that Ame was often abused and reported seeing her forced to walk back and forth on the sidewalk, barefoot, in extremely hot Phoenix temperatures. In one instance, Ame had been made to walk barefoot on the burning hot pavement in 114-degree weather for fifteen minutes. At other times she was beaten with a paddle which they called the "Butt Buster", forced to eat hot sauce and dog feces, and crush aluminum cans while barefoot. Ame was also forced to sleep on the floor of the shower without bedding as punishment for bed-wetting.

The family had often moved and had lived in Pennsylvania, Utah, Texas and Tucson, Arizona, among other places. When the family lived in Wisconsin, the local child protective services were called because of the "disgusting conditions" of their residence. Before the family moved to Phoenix, Arizona, they were living in Ogden, Utah, where school officials claimed that they had reported many incidences of abuse and neglect about the family's children to the authorities. School officials claimed that Ame and her siblings came to school filthy. They said Ame often had head lice and once had cat urine on her shoes. The school officials noted that Ame seemed to be the scapegoat of the family. While living in Phoenix, Ame and the other children were supposedly being home-schooled.

David Deal, Ame's possible father, was reported living in the back of the family rental home in a tent with his two other children. Of all the children living in the home, Ame was the only one abused.

Police claimed that the other children instigated situations to get Ame in trouble. The children were also persuaded to lie about why and how Ame ended up in the footlocker to the police. When asked why Ame was treated so badly, it was said, "She was mentally a little slow, but that's it." Witnesses also said the children were often seen wandering the streets until very late at night, with hardly any clothes on. On occasions, they were without diapers or shoes. One neighbor said that he saw babies in highchairs eating in front, outside of the house, late at night.

=== Death ===
On July 12, 2011, police officers were called to Ame Deal's home, where she was found dead in her own urine and sweat within a small plastic footlocker that was placed in a hot garage. She suffocated to death, with heat exhaustion and dehydration being contributors. Ame had been living with her grandmother, Judith Deal, and Cynthia Stoltzmann, 44, the aunt and legal guardian of Ame. Also living there were Cynthia Stoltzmann's daughter, Sammantha, and her son-in-law, John Allen, both 23, and twelve or more children. The family first told the police officers that Ame was playing hide-n-seek and locked herself in the footlocker the night before, after the adults went to sleep. They all claimed that they found Ame dead the next day in the container. Police suspected foul play since Ame was found very dirty with bruises on her left leg, since it was in forced contact with the trunk. After being interrogated for a while, Sammantha and John Allen confessed to locking Ame in the trunk, as a form of punishment, because she took a popsicle without permission. Ame was said to be "chronically hungry".

Ame, who was 4 feet, 2 inches and 59 pounds, had to be squeezed into the trunk since its dimensions were less than 3 feet in length and only 1 foot in both width and depth. Before Ame was squeezed into the trunk, she was forced to do jumping jacks and backbends and to run around in 103-degree heat for over an hour. Then the trunk was locked with a padlock taken from the fence in the backyard. David and his family members all claimed that Ame is not his daughter. Police claimed the family abused Ame because they did not believe she was a blood relative.

== Arrests ==
Mugshots of Cynthia Stoltzmann, Judith Deal, John Allen and Sammantha Allen

Both Sammantha and John Allen (born June 14 and July 19, 1988, respectively) were arrested for murder on July 27, 2011. Judith Deal and Cynthia Stoltzmann were arrested for child abuse and kidnapping, since they both admitted that in the past they too, had locked Ame in the trunk. Sammantha and John Allen's bail bonds were both set at $1 million. Cynthia Stoltzmann and her mother's bond were each set at $500,000. A few days after the arrests, David Deal asked various friends and family for money to bail his mother, Judith Deal and his sister, Cynthia Stoltzmann out of jail.

David Martin Deal was not charged in the death of his daughter, but was sentenced on June 6, 2013, after pleading guilty to attempted child abuse.

== Indictment ==
On August 10, 2011, in Maricopa County, Arizona, Judith Deal, Cynthia Stoltzmann and the Allens were formally indicted. Judith Deal and Cynthia Stoltzmann were charged with numerous counts of child abuse. John and Sammantha Allen were charged with first degree murder, conspiracy to commit child abuse and many counts of child abuse. Prosecutors announced they intended to seek the death penalty for John and Sammantha Allen.

== Sentencing ==
David Martin Deal pled guilty to attempted child abuse and was sentenced to 14 years in prison on July 6, 2013. Cynthia Stoltzmann pled guilty to two counts of child abuse and one count of attempted child abuse. On September 13, 2013, she was sentenced to 24 years in prison and given a lifetime of probation. Judith Deal also pled guilty to attempted child abuse, and was sentenced to 10 years in prison, plus a lifetime of probation.

Sammantha Allen was sentenced to death by lethal injection on August 7, 2017, for the charge of first-degree murder and to 74 years' imprisonment for the child abuse and conspiracy to commit child abuse charges. She is one of only three women on Arizona's death row (the others are Shawna Forde and Wendi Andriano). John Allen was found guilty of murder on November 8, 2017, and on November 17, 2017, was sentenced to death by lethal injection.

The convictions and death sentences imposed upon John and Samantha Allen were upheld by the Arizona Supreme Court in 2020 and 2022, respectively.

== See also ==
- Child abuse
- Capital punishment in Arizona
- List of murdered American children
- List of death row inmates in the United States § Arizona
- List of women on death row in the United States
