= Rosie Alfaro =

American murderer (born 1971)

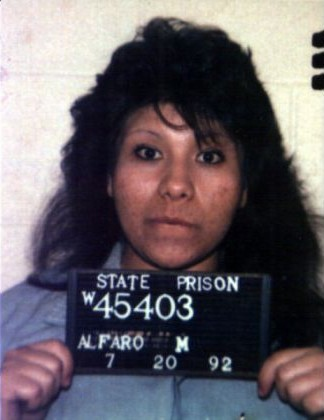
- Mug shot of Alfaro
- Born: Maria del Rosio Alfaro; October 12, 1971 (age 55); Anaheim, California, U.S.
- Motive: Robbery; Witness elimination
- Convictions: First degree murder with special circumstances First degree residential robbery First degree residential burglary
- Penalty: Death; commuted to life imprisonment without parole

Details
- Victims: Autumn Wallace, 9
- Date: June 15, 1990
- Country: United States
- State: California

Maria del Rosio "Rosie" Alfaro (born October 12, 1971) is an American woman convicted of the 1990 murder of 9-year-old Autumn Wallace in Anaheim, California.

== Early life ==
Alfaro was raised in Anaheim, California. She became addicted to drugs at age 13 and began working as a prostitute at 14. She had her first child at age 15 and had four children at age 18. At age 20, Alfaro became the first woman in Orange County, California to receive a death penalty sentence.

== Murder of Autumn Wallace ==
On June 15, 1990, 9-year-old Autumn Wallace (January 15, 1981 – June 15, 1990) was home by herself in Anaheim, California; she was waiting for her older sister and mother to return home from work. Alfaro, who was 18 at the time, knew the Wallace family very well and was friendly with one of the older daughters. She thought that they were out, and that she would be able to steal items from the home to sell in order to purchase drugs.

Autumn, who knew Alfaro as a friend of her sister, opened the door for Alfaro, who asked to use the bathroom. Alfaro took a knife from the kitchen before proceeding to the bathroom, located at the back of the house. She then coaxed Autumn into the bathroom on a ruse, and stabbed her 57 times. Alfaro then raided the house for something to steal, supposedly to acquire drug money. The stolen property was later sold for $240.

Alfaro confessed to the crime during a police-taped interview, stating she was high on heroin and cocaine (never proven since she was not arrested and drug tested within the 36 to 48 hours of the murder) when she stabbed Autumn. Later she changed her story and alleged an unidentified man forced her to stab the little girl. Still later, Alfaro told police that two men drove her to the Wallace home, and one of the men entered the house and forced her to kill Autumn. She refused to identify the man. The evidence from the crime scene only indicated that members of the Wallace family and Alfaro (based on her fingerprints and a matched bloodstained shoe print) were present in the home that day.

== Sentencing ==
She was tried and convicted of first-degree murder with special circumstances. At the end of the penalty phase of the trial, the jury deadlocked 10–2 on the sentence of death. The penalty phase of the trial was then declared a mistrial. A second jury returned a verdict of death. The trial judge upheld the jury's verdict and sentenced Alfaro to death.

Alfaro was the first woman sentenced to death in the gas chamber, and at the time of sentencing was the third woman on death row in California. Her sentence was commuted along with all of California’s death row inmates on November 5, 2026.

== See also ==
- List of death row inmates in the United States
- List of women on death row in the United States
