= Arrendale State Prison =

Women's prison in Georgia, United States

Coordinates: 34.45094°N 83.59347°W

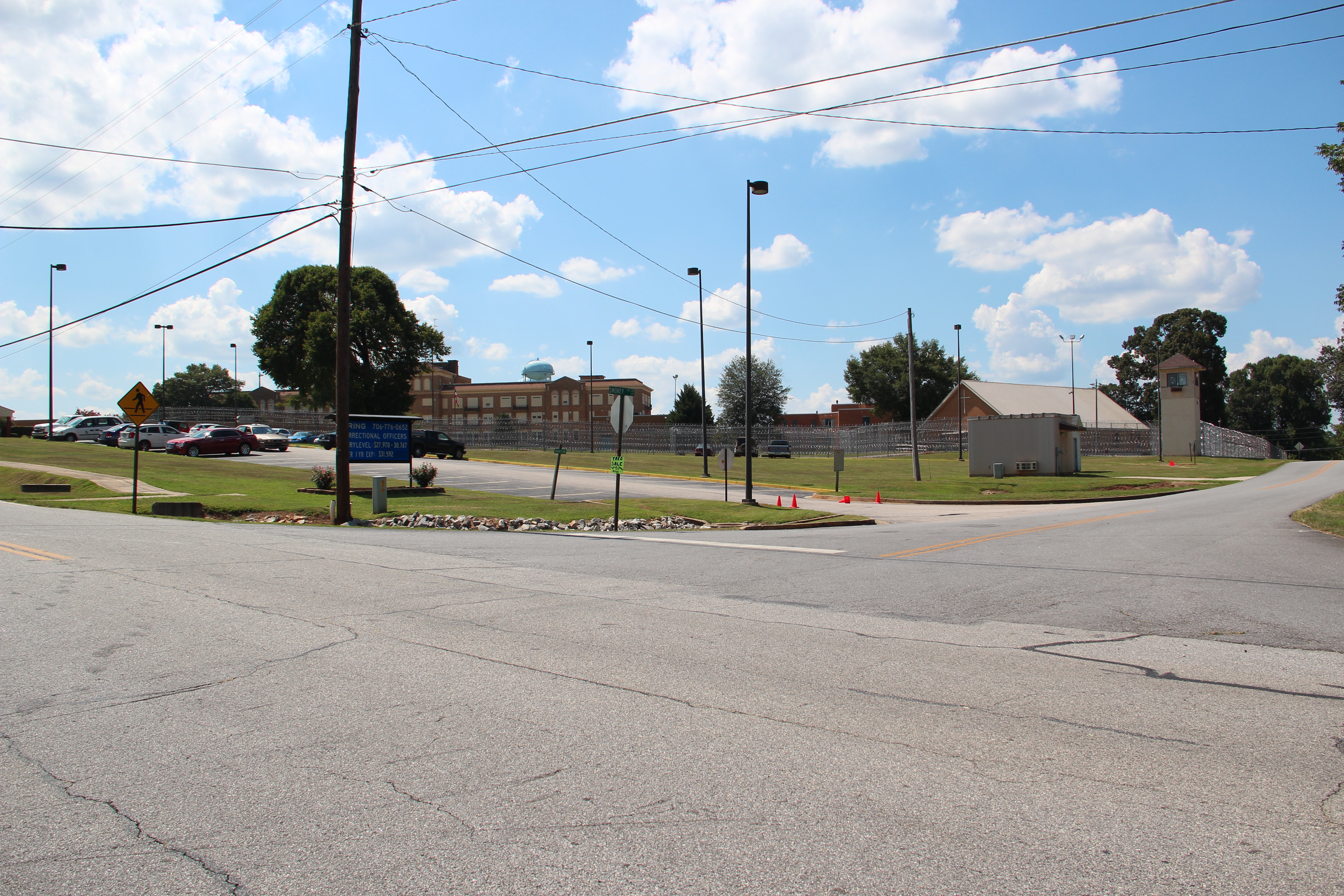
- Interactive map of Arrendale State Prison
- Location: 2023 Gainesville Hwy Raoul, Georgia (Alto address)
- Status: open
- Security class: mixed
- Capacity: 1476
- Opened: 1926 / 1951
- Managed by: Georgia Department of Corrections

Lee Arrendale State Prison of the Georgia Department of Corrections is a women's prison located in Raoul, unincorporated Habersham County, Georgia, near Alto, and in proximity to Gainesville. It houses the state death row for women.

It became exclusively a women's prison in early 2005. A number of the young male inmates were kept there until mid-2005, when they were moved to other prisons in the state. The prison has four dormitories and a medical building. The officers at Arrendale are still transitioning from one of the most violent prisons in Georgia to a general purpose women's prison. In March 2006, the prison took in 350 women prisoners from Georgia's overflowing jail system.

== History ==
In 2004, the prison housed 1200 adult male inmates, mostly under the age of 25, in addition to 11 juveniles between the ages of 13 and 16. 140 of the adult inmates between the ages of 17 and 20 were declared too vulnerable to be housed with the general population.

The prison had come under scrutiny for failing to ensure the safety of its youth inmates. One inmate was strangled to death in February 2004. At the prison, juvenile inmates are kept separate from the adult population but attend education classes together.

As a result of the prison's troubles, the state of Georgia decided to make Arrendale a women's prison to improve its status as the second most violent prison in the state.

Arrendale is also home to the United States' first all-female fire department and the state's first inmate fire department, thanks to the Georgia Department of Corrections' (GDC) Fire Services Division. The GDC operates many fire departments throughout the state, staffed solely by inmates, who are supervised by a POST-certified GDC employee who is also trained as a firefighter. The inmate firefighter program provides protection to the largely rural communities near the prisons, as well as to other locations in Georgia during emergencies. Inmates are carefully selected and are trained and certified in accordance with Georgia law and the Georgia Firefighter Standards and Training Council, as with any regular fire department. In 2007, inmate fire squads responded to the wildfires in South Georgia, in addition to the hundreds of other alarms they received statewide.

The older original part of the prison was built in 1911 as a tuberculosis sanitarium and operated till the mid-1950s when it was turned over to the Georgia Prison system. Specifically used as a prison for youthful offenders ages 18–25, the prison was known in the 1960s and 1970s when it had a high school rated football team and marching band. The football team was mostly undefeated until all local high schools refused to play them and lobbied the Georgia Department of Education to make them disband. At the same time, Warden E. B. Caldwell made it mandatory that all inmates obtain a GED diploma and enroll in one of the on-site Vocational Schools that were started under the administration of Warden Walter Matthews.

The prison was named after Lee Arrendale, former chairman of the Georgia Board of Corrections, after he and his wife were killed in a plane crash.

== Notable Inmates ==
=== Non-death row ===
- Jennifer Rosenbaum is currently serving a sentence of life + 40 years for the abuse of foster children in her care and the murder of two year old Laila Daniel on November 17, 2015. She claimed that the child had choked on a chicken nugget and the injuries resulted from bad CPR. The medical examiner found that Laila Daniel had died from blunt force trauma to her abdomen, a transected pancreas, damaged liver, and intestinal injuries. In addition to the internal injuries, Laila Daniel had over 90 bruises and abrasions to her head and body, including belt and belt buckle marks to her body and groin area, and 3 broken bones in various stages of healing. She was found guilty of felony murder as well as many counts of aggravated assault, aggravated battery, and cruelty to children and sentenced on August 1, 2019.
- Shawntae Harris, an American rapper and actress, better known as "Da Brat" served three years for aggravated assault of a waitress at a nightclub. She attempted an unsuccessful escape on September 18, 2008, which could have resulted in Harris facing more time. She was released from custody on February 28, 2011.
- Andrea Sneiderman was convicted of 9 counts of perjury following the murder of her husband, Rusty. Andrea Sneiderman was sentenced to 5 years in prison in August 2013.
- Sonya Smith is currently serving life plus 30 years (the maximum punishment) for the abuse and murder, in collaboration with her husband Joseph, of their eight-year-old son Josef. The case prompted authorities in 2004 to raid the family's church, Remnant Fellowship, because it supports corporal punishment. However, "police who testified during the couple's trial said they could not find a link between the boy's death and the church's teachings about punishment." The church fully funds the Smiths' legal defense on an ongoing basis, and continues to publicly support them and their actions, even maintaining a website for them. They have made several attempts to obtain a new trial, a case review, or an appeal; every attempt has been rejected.

=== Death row ===
- Tiffany Moss is currently Georgia's only female death row inmate. She was convicted in 2019 for the 2013 torture and starvation death of her stepdaughter, Emani Moss.
- Kelly Gissendaner was executed on September 30, 2015, for the orchestration of her husband's murder on February 7, 1997. She was the first woman to be executed by the state of Georgia since 1945.
