= Murder of Emani Moss =

2013 child murder

- Victim Emani Moss
- Location: Lawrenceville, Georgia, U.S.
- Date: October 28, 2013; 13 years ago
- Attack type: Child murder by starvation, torture murder, filicide
- Victim: Emani Gabrielle Moss
- Perpetrators: Tiffany Nicole Moss; Eman Giovanni Moss
- Motive: Resentment, Cinderella effect
- Verdict: Tiffany: Guilty on all counts Eman: Pleaded guilty
- Convictions: Tiffany: Malice murder; Felony murder (2 counts); First-degree cruelty to children (2 counts); Concealing the death of another; Eman: Felony murder; Concealing the death of another
- Sentence: Tiffany: Death plus 20 years Eman: Life imprisonment without the possibility of parole plus 10 years

Emani Gabrielle Moss (April 23, 2003 – October 28, 2013) was a ten-year-old American girl who was starved to death by her stepmother in Lawrenceville, Georgia, in 2013, in what became a prominent case leading to reforms in Georgia's child welfare system. Tiffany Nicole Moss (born July 20, 1983) was convicted in 2019 of murdering Emani, and was subsequently sentenced to death. The murder received national as well as international attention. The attention was largely due to the crime's severe nature; Moss physically abused Emani for several years before her death.

In 2013, Moss began starving Emani. Emani's father, Eman, who was rarely home, failed to stop the abuse. Emani died of starvation on October 28, 2013. At the time of her death, she weighed 32 pounds (15 kilograms), the weight of an average toddler. The murder led to several systemic changes in the Georgia Division of Family and Child Services (GDFCS). Eman pled guilty in 2015 for his role in the crime. The case against Moss went to trial, and in April 2019, Moss, who represented herself, was convicted of all counts. On May 1, 2019, she was sentenced to death. She is currently incarcerated at the Arrendale State Prison and is Georgia's only female death row inmate.

== Background ==
Emani Gabrielle Moss was born on April 23, 2003. Shortly after Emani's birth, her mother, addicted to drugs, surrendered her parental rights, and Emani's father, Eman, gained sole custody of her. Emani was one of five children born to her mother. Her mother surrendered parental rights to all of her children. Eman was charged with and convicted of battery and second-degree child cruelty in 2004 after beating Emani's biological mother in front of her.

=== Prior abuse by Tiffany Moss ===
Eman largely raised Emani and often took her to the Freedom Christian Church. There, he met Tiffany Moss, a preschool teacher. Eman and Tiffany married in July 2009 and had two children, a son and a daughter. Though there are no records indicating that Tiffany abused her biological children, she did abuse Emani. The abuse increased in March 2010 after a beating of Emani caused Moss to lose her job. Emani, then age six, told a school nurse that she feared going home with a bad report card because she worried her parents would hurt her. She also told the nurse that her stepmother had spanked her with a curtain rod. The nurse then found multiple scabs, bruises, and welts on Emani's arms, back, chest, legs, and shoulders, and Emani was taken to the police headquarters. Tiffany was arrested and charged with first-degree child cruelty. Tiffany admitted to hitting Emani three times after she failed to do her homework. She pleaded guilty and was sentenced to five years of probation as part of Georgia's First Offender Program. The Georgia Division of Family and Children Services (GDFCS) signed the plea deal. The GDFCS dismissed a case against Tiffany and Eman after they completed parenting classes.

After the March 2010 beating, Emani was taken from her father and stepmother's home and placed with her grandmother Robin, staying with her for about six months. During this time, Emani's school performance improved. Eman fought for custody of Emani, and in the fall of 2010, the GDFCS returned her to him. Robin fought to retain custody of her granddaughter. Though she suspected Emani was being abused, she could not persuade authorities to give her custody. Prosecutors later argued at trial that the March 2010 abuse incident launched an escalating cycle of more abuse that ultimately resulted in Emani's death. Because Moss had pleaded guilty to beating Emani, she was no longer allowed to teach preschool. This made her resent Emani, as she blamed her for the job loss.

Moss continued to abuse Emani for the next several years. In July 2012, Emani twice tried to run away from home. In one case, she went to the apartment office and told them she wanted to run away because Moss had tied her up with a belt and placed her in a cold shower. The police responded and were told by Moss that Emani was not telling the truth. Because there was not enough evidence to charge anyone, Emani was returned to Eman and Moss. In another July 2012 incident, Emani ran away and was found sleeping in the bushes of a nearby apartment complex by a police officer. Emani told the officer that she had run away because her stepmother was mean to her. The officer reported the event to the GDFCS and filed runaway and curfew violation charges against Emani to ensure she would see a juvenile court judge.

From 2011 to the summer of 2013, the Moss family moved around, sometimes living with family. Eman, who worked long hours, did not see his daughter often. He later reported at trial that she would eat a lot when he saw her on the weekends when he was in charge of the children. When the Mosses lived on their own, Emani rarely saw extended family. In May 2013, the Mosses visited Eman's sister Sharoniece's house for Mother's Day. Sharoniece and Robin noticed that Emani's hair had been cut. When Robin confronted Moss about it, Moss reportedly said, "if you act ugly, you should look ugly." Sharoniece also noticed that Emani acted more timidly. After the 2012–2013 school year ended, Eman and Moss announced that they would pull Emani from public school and homeschool her. Sharoniece objected to the idea and called the GDFCS, asking them to intervene. Still, they declined. On August 6, 2013, the GDFCS received an anonymous tip that Emani was being neglected by her father and stepmother and "appeared to be thin." According to a lawsuit against the GDFCS filed by Robin, the GDFCS did not visit the home and did not conduct a follow-up "due to having no current address and no current maltreatment."

== Starvation and murder ==
May 12, 2013 (Mother's Day) was the last time any members of Emani's family, besides her father, stepmother, and siblings, saw her alive. In the late summer of 2013, Eman, Moss, their children, and Emani moved to an apartment in Lawrenceville, Georgia. According to District Attorney Danny Porter, this was when, "for all intents and purposes, Emani vanished from the face of the earth." During this time, Eman worked two jobs, making him largely absent from Emani's life. He would leave for his first job in the early morning, briefly return in the late afternoon, and then leave for his second job around 6:00 pm before finally returning at around 10:30 pm or 11:00 pm. While Eman was at work, Moss was left to care for the children.

At some point, Moss began to starve Emani. According to prosecutors, the starvation likely lasted several weeks. During this time, Emani was confined to her bedroom. Neighbors only saw Moss's biological children and did not know they had an older sister. Emani eventually became too weak to move and could not leave her bed, urinate or defecate. Though Moss denied food to Emani, she did take care of and feed her two biological children. On several occasions, she sent Eman pictures of meals she had prepared for her children, and in another instance, she asked her husband to bring home cookie dough so she could bake. At trial, prosecutors pointed out that Emani would have had to smell the baked cookies as she lay in her room starving to death. According to Dr. Staffenberg, the medical examiner who testified at trial, the process of starving to death would have been painful. At first, Emani would have experienced hunger pangs. She then would have become fatigued. She would continue losing energy and weight until she ultimately died.

In the early evening of October 24, Emani suffered what Eman believed was a seizure. Eman testified that when he came home, Moss told him something was wrong with Emani. He then went into the bathroom and found his daughter in the bathtub shaking. Emani was unresponsive, and her eyes were rolling back and forth. Eman moved Emani to her bed, where she stayed for the next couple of days. Eman visited her during this time and tried to feed her but was unsuccessful. Emani died on October 28, 2013. By the time Emani died, she was severely underweight, with Dr. Staffenberg describing her as "more or less skin and bones." She weighed 32 pounds (15 kilograms), the weight of the average three-year-old. Additionally, her organs were found at autopsy to be very small.

On October 28, Moss called Eman at work to tell him that Emani was dead. Eman testified at trial that when he came home from work, the family seemed normal, with the children playing and Moss watching TV. He found his daughter lying on a blanket on her bedroom floor. He told his wife that they should call the police though she insisted they could not do so because she would lose her children. Moss told Eman they needed to hide Emani's body and "be on our criminal mind." Eman wrapped Emani's body with blankets and moved her to the computer room. The couple kept Emani's body in their apartment for several days, and their lives largely went back to normal. Eman testified at trial that he would go to work and spend time at home with Emani's body grieving.

=== Cover-up and arson ===
The Moss couple agreed to cover up Emani's death. The day after Emani's death, Moss went to Anna's Linens and bought new sheets and a new coverall, as the ones Emani had used were covered with excrement and urine. Moss suggested burying Emani and reporting her as a runaway. Eman went to Walmart and bought a galvanized trash can, trash bags, charcoal, and lighter fluid. On Halloween, Moss and Eman decided to put Emani's body in the trash can and burn it. When they tried to place her in the trash can, they found that she was stiff with rigor mortis and used duct tape to compress her body. Eman covered her with a comforter. The Mosses then stuffed Emani's body in the trash bag. In the early morning of November 1, the Moss couple put the trash can containing Emani's body in the back of their car and took their children to find a place to burn it. They found a secluded location to commit the arson and removed the trash can from the vehicle. They added charcoal briquettes to the bottom of the can, doused Emani's body with lighter fluid, and set it on fire. As the couple watched the body burn, they found it would not burn to ash. After about five minutes, they extinguished the fire and took the trash can and Emani's body back to the apartment.

== Criminal proceedings ==
=== Investigation and arrests ===
Tiffany Nicole Moss
- Born: July 20, 1983 (age 43)
- Spouse: Eman Moss
- Children: 2
- Status: Incarcerated
- Convictions: Malice murder; Felony murder (2 counts); First-degree cruelty to children (3 counts) (Note: 1 count in 2009, 2 counts in 2019); Concealing the death of another
- Penalty: Death plus 20 years (2019); 5 years probation (2009)

Details
- Victims: Emani Gabrielle Moss
- Date: October 28, 2013
- State: Georgia

The day after attempting to burn Emani's body, Eman went to work with Emani's body still in the back of his car. He confessed to a friend about the crime. The friend urged him to call the police. Eman thought about it, and after coming home from his second job, he decided to contact the police. At 4:00 am he made the call, saying he was suicidal. Eman informed Moss about his call to the police. Upon learning that the police had been called, Moss placed the trash can with Emani's remains in a grassy area at the apartment and fled in the family vehicle with her children. Upon arrival at the apartment, the police were told by Eman that Emani had drunk some chemicals and died. He claimed that he had panicked and put her body in a trash can outside the apartment and tried to cremate it. Police found the body and did not believe Eman's story, quickly identifying him and his wife as suspects. Eman was arrested almost immediately. Moss dropped her children off at her mother's house and ultimately turned herself in. Eman ultimately confessed to covering up Emani's murder by reporting her as a runaway and trying to burn her body. In 2015 he pled guilty to felony murder and concealing a death. He was sentenced to life in prison without the possibility of parole. In exchange, he agreed to testify against Moss, who rejected a plea deal that would have allowed her to be sentenced to life in prison. Eman is currently incarcerated at the Smith State Prison in Glennville, Georgia. The case against Moss instead went to trial.

=== Trial and death sentence ===
Moss's trial began on April 15, 2019, and was presided over by Judge George Hutchinson. The jury consisted of six men and six women. Moss, who was appointed lawyers through the State Office of the Capital Defender, decided to represent herself, despite Judge Hutchinson's efforts to persuade her otherwise. Instead of representing her, her defense attorneys served as standby attorneys to answer any legal questions. During pre-trial hearings and jury selection, Judge Hutchinson urged Moss to rely upon the standby counsel, but she refused. Moss did not give an opening statement. Nor did she cross-examine any witnesses, or give a closing argument. District Attorney Danny Porter and Assistant District Attorney Lisa Jones called eighteen witnesses, including Emani's aunt, grandmother, and fourth-grade teacher. They also called Eman and Dr. Staffenberg, the medical examiner who performed an autopsy on Emani's body.

On April 29, Moss was convicted on all six counts, including one count of malice murder, two counts of felony murder, two counts of cruelty to children, and one count of concealing a death. The jury deliberated for less than three hours. During the sentencing phase, Moss declined to address the jury, present mitigating evidence, or have her relatives who had attended the trial testify on her behalf. She also refused to make a closing statement. In the state's closing argument, Porter argued that Moss did not deserve a life sentence, whether it be a life sentence with parole or a life without parole sentence. She should not be given the opportunity to be released, he argued, because she would never change. "She's shown you too much of her capacity for cruelty. There will always be that dark side waiting to come out." He also argued that for Moss, life without parole would not be a worse sentence than death because she did not regret her crimes and would never be bothered by them.

After closing arguments, the jury began deliberating. After the first day, they appeared conflicted and were told by Judge Hutchinson to go home and "sleep on it." They continued deliberations the next day and ultimately agreed on the death penalty as a punishment for Moss. Sentencing occurred on May 1. Judge Hutchinson agreed with the jury's recommendation and sentenced Moss, then age thirty-six, to death by lethal injection. Moss was the first person to be sentenced to death in Georgia in over five years. Judge Hutchinson scheduled her execution for between June 7 and 14, 2019. Porter said of the death sentence, "there's no joy when a jury imposes a death sentence. But this was one of the worst cases I've ever seen. The first time you look at it, it made you sick. The last time you look at it it makes you sick." The execution did not occur during the June 7–14 time frame due to the appeals process, which resulted in an automatic stay of execution being applied to the initial scheduled execution date. She is currently incarcerated at Arrendale State Prison and is Georgia's only female death row inmate. If Moss is eventually executed, she will be the third woman in Georgia to be executed since 1945.

=== Appeals ===
Despite representing herself at trial, Moss accepted legal representation in her appeal. Soon after she was sentenced to death, the Georgia Capital Defender group filed a motion asking for a new trial, arguing, among other things, that Moss was not competent to act as her attorney. According to her attorneys, Moss has "neuropsychological testing data that showed the defendant to have damage to the premotor and prefrontal regions of the brain." A status hearing regarding the motion was held on August 23, 2019.

== Aftermath ==
Eman and Moss, who remain married, lost custody of their two children after Emani's murder. The children were sent to live with foster parents. The Moss couple, along with both Moss and Eman's mothers, tried to gain custody. In 2019, Porter told local news that the children were adopted by their foster parents. The couple's son, who was three years old when Emani was murdered, reportedly did have some memories of the crime. However, according to Porter, at the time of the interview in April 2019, the children were "doing great" and may never know what happened.

=== Legacy ===
Emani's murder led to criticisms of and systemic changes in Georgia's child welfare system. After the murder, an intake case manager, a social services administrator, and a program assistant at the GDFCS were all terminated. Others were reportedly disciplined. The murder led the department to enact reforms, including deeper investigations into allegations of abuse and changing how it assembles maltreatment reports. New case managers and supervisors were hired, reducing caseloads. Agency workers no longer decide whether reports warrant investigations based entirely on information gathered over the telephone. Additionally, no case is assigned a less-serious, lower-priority status until a caseworker meets a child who allegedly has been abused. After Emani's death, along with several other abuse-related deaths, the Child Welfare Reform Council was commissioned by Governor Nathan Deal. In January 2015, the Council released a report with recommendations on ways to improve Georgia's child welfare system.

In 2018, Emani's grandmother Robin filed a lawsuit in the Gwinnett County State Court against the GDFCS, arguing that caseworkers were aware of deteriorating conditions and abuse in the Moss family and could have acted earlier. Robin is also suing the Department of Human Services. She is seeking a jury trial and "reasonable compensatory damages." According to the lawsuit, there were multiple occasions where the department could have investigated the Moss household and intervened on behalf of Emani: "As a result of the negligence of DFCS and its agents, Emani suffered constant abuse and deprivation from 2008 until her untimely death." The lawsuit also states: "As a direct and proximate result of defendant's wrongful conduct, plaintiff is entitled to recover for the wrongful death of Emani, including the full value of the economic and non-economic value of her life had she lived."

== See also ==
- List of death row inmates in the United States
- List of murdered American children
- List of women on death row in the United States
- Murder of Mary Welch – Murder perpetrated by Seth Welch and Tatiana Fusari
