= Robin Lee Row =

American murderer on death row

- Born: September 12, 1957 (age 69)
- Occupation: YWCA employee
- Spouse: Randy Row (deceased)
- Children: Joshua, Tabitha, Keith, and Christina (all deceased)
- Status: On appeal
- Motive: Insurance fraud
- Convictions: First degree murder (3 counts); Aggravated arson
- Penalty: Death

Details
- Date apprehended: February 13, 1992; 34 years ago

Robin Lee Row (born September 12, 1957) is a death row inmate in Idaho, having been convicted of the murders of her husband and two children. The murders took place on February 10, 1992, when a fire broke out on the first floor of the southwest Boise apartment in which her husband, from whom she was separated, and her two children were living. When fire crews reached the scene of the burning structure, they found three bodies that were subsequently identified as her husband Randy (age 34) and their children Joshua (10) and Tabitha (8). All three had died due to carbon monoxide poisoning.

== Investigation ==
Fire investigators concluded that a liquid accelerant was used to start the fire and, upon further investigation, that the smoke alarm had been turned off. Row had been living with friends and investigators had placed her as the main suspect. Current Ada County Sheriff Gary Raney was the chief investigator on the case. As he delved into the case, he saw many red flags that indicated that Robin Row was the main suspect. Further investigation concluded that in 1980, she and her son Keith were living in a cabin in California. Her son died in a fire that was caused by a portable heater that ignited his blankets. The boy died, and Row collected $28,000 from the life insurance policy.

== Arrest and conviction ==
As the investigation progressed, Row was embezzling money from the YWCA where she worked. Detectives found that Row had taken out life insurance policies on her husband and children, totaling over a quarter of a million dollars. She was arrested on February 13 and charged with three counts of first-degree murder. Her trial began in 1993; she was found guilty on each count in March, and sentenced to death on December 16 by Judge Alan Schwartzman.

== Appeals ==
In 2011, Row's appeal was dismissed by U.S. District Court Judge B. Lynn Winmill. She is the sole death row inmate in Pocatello Women's Correctional Center (PWCC) in Pocatello.

== See also ==
- List of death row inmates in the United States
- List of women on death row in the United States
