= Habersham County School District =

School district in Georgia (U.S. state)

Address
- 132 Stanford Mill Road Clarkesville, Georgia, 30523; United States
- Coordinates: 34.608179°N 83.523165°W

District information
- Grades: Pre-school - 12
- Superintendent: Patrick Franklin
- Accreditations: Southern Association of Colleges and Schools; Georgia Accrediting Commission

Students and staff
- Enrollment: 5,955
- Faculty: 365

Other information
- Telephone: (706) 754-2118
- Fax: (706) 754-1549
- Website: www.habershamschools.com

The Habersham County School District is a public school district in Habersham County, Georgia, United States, based in Clarkesville. It serves the communities of Alto, Baldwin, Clarkesville, Cornelia, Demorest, Mount Airy, Raoul, and Tallulah Falls.

== Schools ==
The Habersham County School District has eight elementary schools, three middle schools, and two high schools.

=== Elementary schools ===
- Baldwin Elementary School
- Clarkesville Elementary School
- Cornelia Elementary School
- Demorest Elementary School
- Fairview Elementary School
- Hazel Grove Elementary School
- Level Grove Elementary School
- Woodville Elementary School

=== Middle schools ===
- North Habersham Sixth Grade Academy (closed 2011)
- North Habersham Middle School
- South Habersham Sixth Grade Academy (closed 2011)
- South Habersham Middle School
- Wilbanks Middle School (opened 2011)

=== High schools ===
- Habersham Ninth Grade Academy
- Habersham Central High School (opened 1970)
- North Habersham High School (closed 1970)

North Habersham High School was in Clarkesville, Georgia, and originally served the northern part of the county. NHHS's mascot was the Bobcat and its colors were black and gold. This facility was demolished in the late 2000s; the site would be used for the new Habersham County Superior Court courthouse, completed in 2014. It is located on 295 Llewellyn Street in Clarkesville, Georgia.

- South Habersham High School (closed 1970)

South Habersham High School was located in Cornelia, Georgia and served the southern part of the county. SHHS's mascot was the Rebels and its colors were red and gray. This facility was demolished in the late 1990s; the site would be used for the new Cornelia Elementary school building completed in the early 2000s.

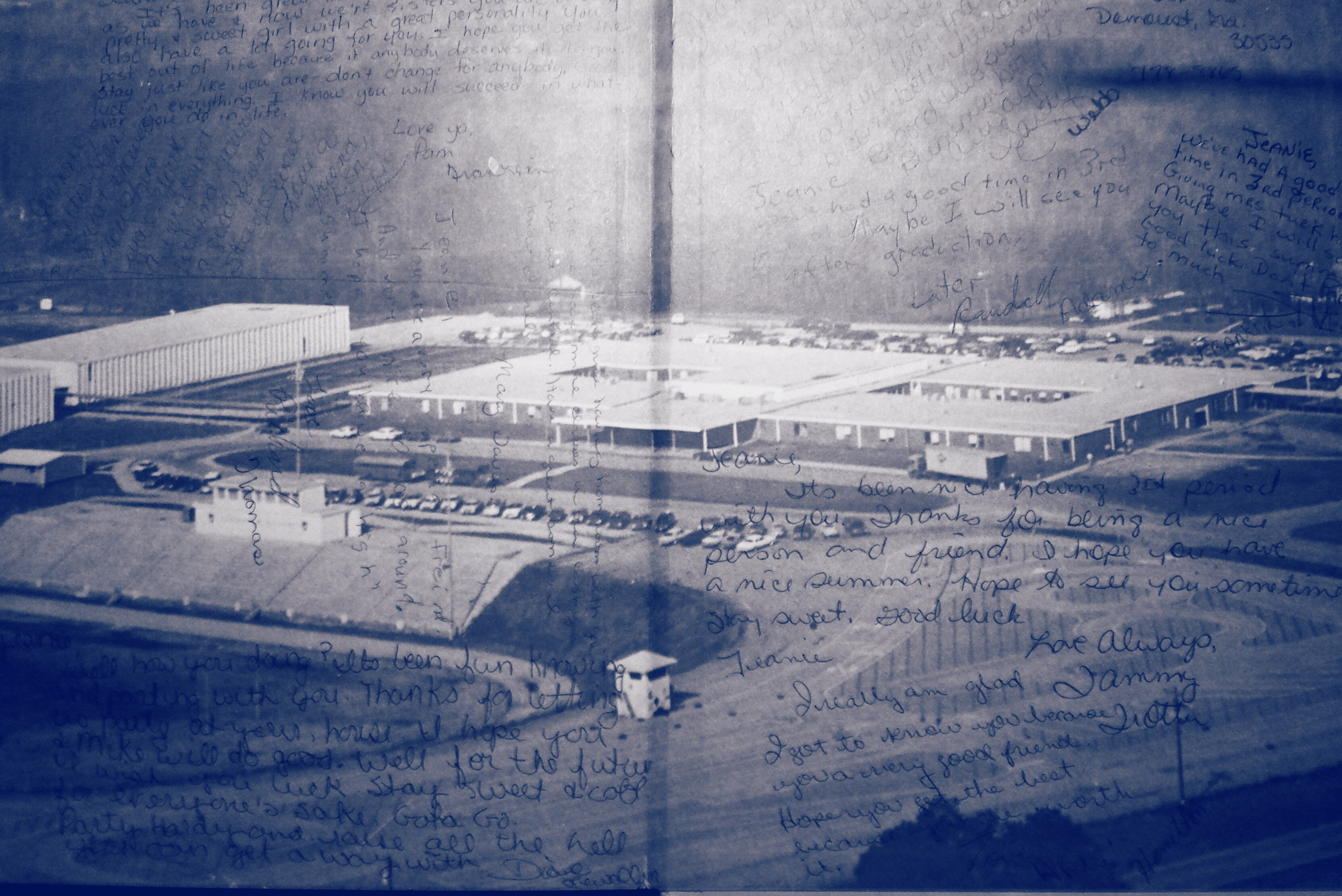
The original Habersham Central facility as it was in 1972–1981. Photo printed in monotone blue and white in the 1979 yearbook, taken circa 1978.

=== Habersham Central High School ===
Habersham Central High School (commonly referred to as Central) was opened in 1970 to consolidate North Habersham High School & South Habersham High School into a central location within the county. Located in the same city at the time, South Habersham's facilities were still utilized until 1972, as Central's campus initially had no football field, gym, or auditorium.

The students at Central voted silver & blue to be the school colors and The Raider (a pirate) to be the school mascot. The first classes at Central began in the late summer of 1970. Central graduated its first class in June 1971.

==== Changes ====
- Construction of the on-campus football field and auditorium was completed in 1972.
- Habersham Central's first head football coach Fred McManus was an Auburn University fan, as one of his former players was a coach at the University in Alabama in the early 1970s. It is believed but not confirmed that a deal was made with the university and in 1972, Habersham Central High School received a donation of some orange and blue equipment. Even though orange was never officially added to the school colors, it has managed become more prominent over the years in uniforms & apparel, and is arguably the dominant color. That being said, the official colors are still silver and blue, as seen in the Alma Mater.
- The original HCHS facility was remodeled sometime between 1981–1988 to better accommodate the increasing number of students. This eliminated the courtyard areas, included a new library section, a new technology section, a new band room, and created a closed hallway linking the gym & the auditorium to the rest of the school. The area of the rear parking lot was also increased.
- Ground was broken in 2009 for a new high school building across Camp Creek Road from the previous facility. The new facility houses grades 10–12. It opened in 2011, graduating its first class in May 2012. The older facility was renovated during the summer of 2011 and currently houses the 9th grade.
- In July 2014, Construction of the agriculture building began beside the practice field. This building was created for shows, having both an indoor and outdoor sections.

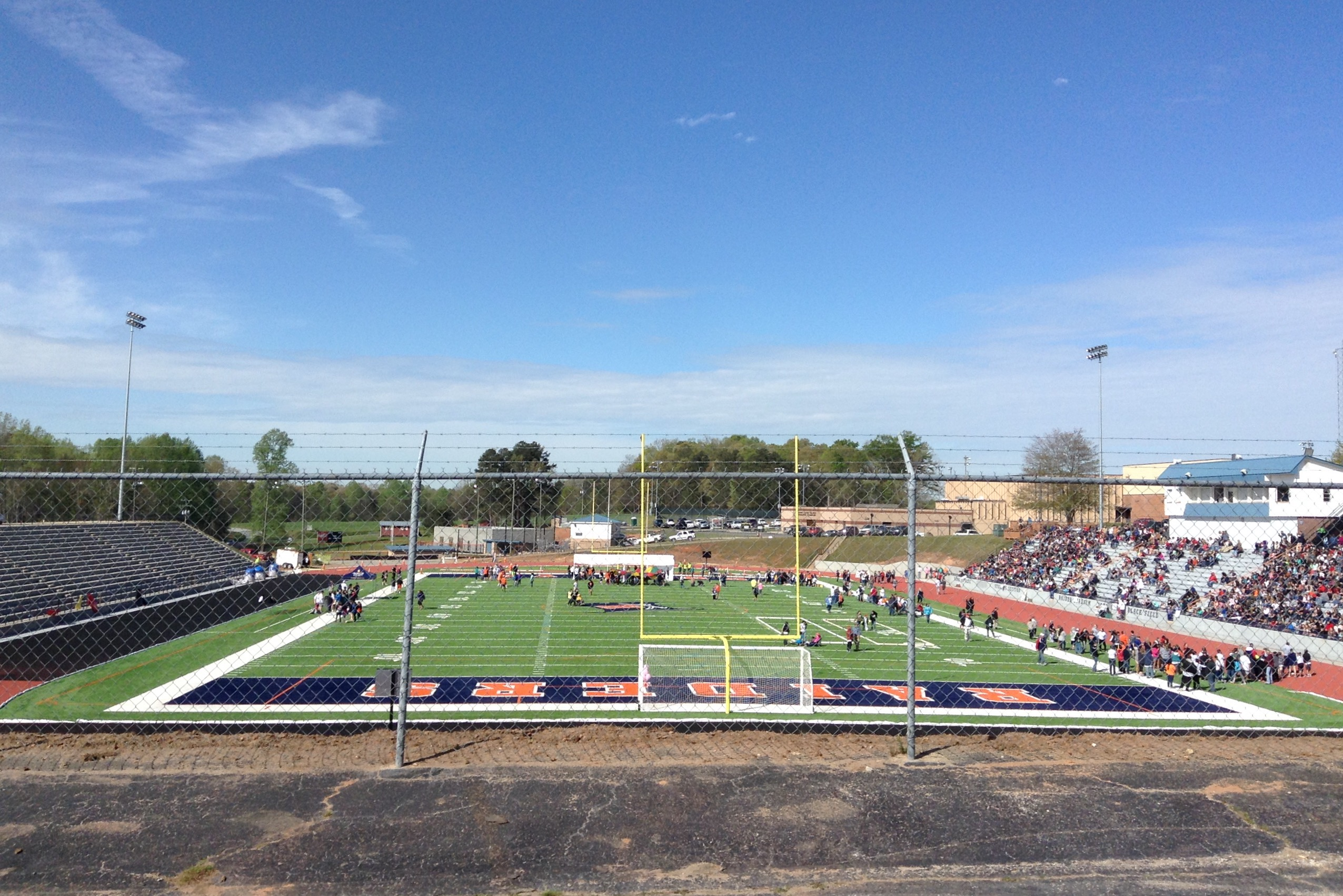
A view from the parking lot beside the stadium shows the new field and track, as well as the indoor facility being built for baseball and softball.

- On November 17, 2015, the Habersham County Board of Education approved proposed plans for AstroTurf installation and a new track up to date with competition regulations. The scoreboard will also be replaced with a new one with a large screen. Construction will begin before the end of the year. This will be the biggest change the stadium has gone through since its construction in 1972.
- The new field was used for the first time on April 15, 2016 for that year's Special Olympic Games. The AstroTurf field was complete, but the new track was only half way completed.

==== Alma Mater ====
Sung to the tune of "Dedicatory Overture" (1:38 - 2:55) composed by Clifton Williams, 1964.

High in the hills of Habersham
Silver and Blue our colors fly,
Honored with love and loyalty
Your name shall never, never die.

Central O Monument of glory
We love you more and more each day.
Tears will flow when we leave these halls
Central, your name shall never die.

==== Trivia ====
- The graduating class of 2016, the 45th graduating class from HCHS since 1971, was the first class to celebrate their graduation on the renovated field.
- The original date of the 2016 graduation ceremony was scheduled for May 20. The day fell on a Friday, which had been a HCHS tradition for decades. Due to poor weather conditions, the graduation ceremony was postponed until the next day, Saturday the 21st.
