= Alto, Georgia =

- Town
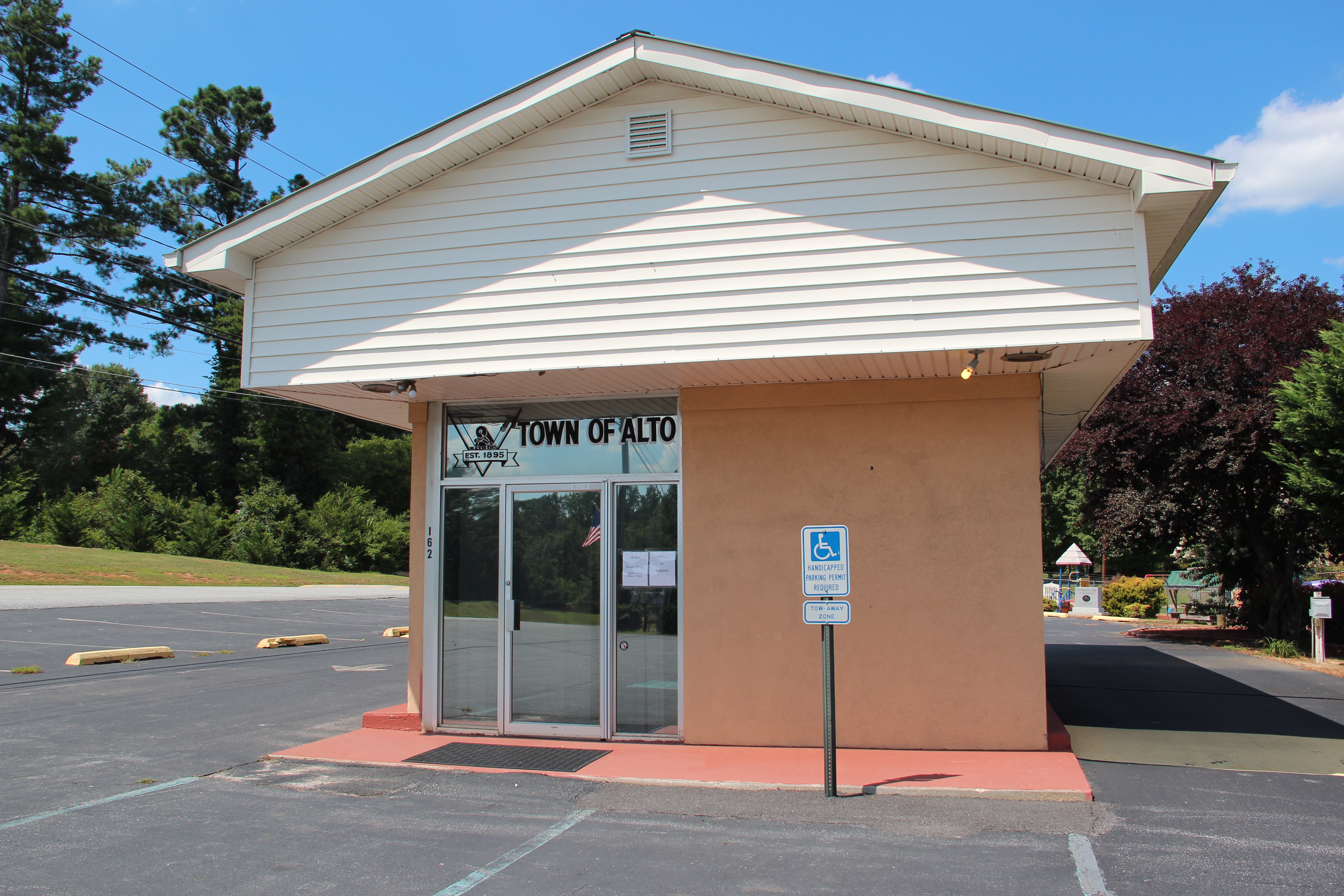
- Alto City Hall

- Flag Seal

- Location in Banks County and the state of Georgia
- Coordinates: 34°27′54″N 83°34′22″W
- Country: United States
- State: Georgia
- Counties: Habersham, Banks

Government
  - Mayor: Patrica Gail Armour

Area
  - Total: 1.14 sq mi (2.94 km^{2})
  - Land: 1.14 sq mi (2.94 km^{2})
  - Water: 0 sq mi (0.00 km^{2})
- Elevation: 1,339 ft (408 m)

Population (2020)
  - Total: 970
  - Density: 855.6/sq mi (330.34/km^{2})
- Time zone: UTC-5 (Eastern (EST))
  - Summer (DST): UTC-4 (EDT)
- ZIP codes: 30510, 30596
- Area code: 706
- FIPS code: 13-01948
- GNIS feature ID: 2405145
- Website: townofaltoga.org

Alto is a town in Banks and Habersham counties in the U.S. state of Georgia. As of the 2020 census, Alto had a population of 970.

== History ==
Alto was so named on account of its (relatively) lofty elevation (1,394 feet above mean sea level). A post office called Alto has been in operation since 1879. The town incorporated in 1895.

== Geography ==
According to the United States Census Bureau, the town has a total area of 1.1 square miles (2.9 km^{2}), all land.

== Demographics ==
Historical population
Census	Pop.	Note	%±
1900	74		—
1910	109		47.3%
1920	168		54.1%
1930	219		30.4%
1940	217		−0.9%
1950	302		39.2%
1960	275		−8.9%
1970	372		35.3%
1980	618		66.1%
1990	651		5.3%
2000	876		34.6%
2010	1,172		33.8%
2020	970		−17.2%
U.S. Decennial Census

=== Racial and ethnic composition ===
Alto town, Georgia – Racial and ethnic composition Note: the US Census treats Hispanic/Latino as an ethnic category. This table excludes Latinos from the racial categories and assigns them to a separate category. Hispanics/Latinos may be of any race.
Race / Ethnicity (NH = Non-Hispanic)	Pop 2000	Pop 2010	Pop 2020	% 2000	% 2010	% 2020
White alone (NH)	600	571	473	68.49%	48.72%	48.76%
Black or African American alone (NH)	25	21	6	2.85%	1.79%	0.62%
Native American or Alaska Native alone (NH)	3	4	2	0.34%	0.34%	0.21%
Asian alone (NH)	52	41	51	5.94%	3.50%	5.26%
Native Hawaiian or Pacific Islander alone (NH)	0	0	1	0.00%	0.00%	0.10%
Other race alone (NH)	0	0	1	0.00%	0.00%	0.10%
Mixed race or Multiracial (NH)	20	24	39	2.28%	2.05%	4.02%
Hispanic or Latino (any race)	176	511	397	20.09%	43.60%	40.93%
Total	876	1,172	970	100.00%	100.00%	100.00%

=== 2020 census ===
In the 2020 census, Alto had 1,172 people. The Alto population by county breakdown was as follows: 656 in Habersham County and 516 in Banks County.

=== 2000 census ===
As of the census of 2000, there were 876 people, 304 households, and 227 families residing in the town. The population density was 1,061.2 inhabitants per square mile (409.7/km^{2}). There were 325 housing units at an average density of 393.7 per square mile (152.0/km^{2}). The racial makeup of the town was 79.22% White, 3.08% African American, 0.34% Native American, 5.94% Asian, 9.02% from other races, and 2.40% from two or more races. Hispanic or Latino of any race were 20.09% of the population.

There were 304 households, out of which 37.5% had children under the age of 18 living with them, 58.2% were married couples living together, 8.9% had a female householder with no husband present, and 25.3% were non-families. 21.7% of all households were made up of individuals, and 6.6% had someone living alone who was 65 years of age or older. The average household size was 2.88 and the average family size was 3.35.

In the town, the population was spread out, with 29.3% under the age of 18, 12.8% from 18 to 24, 32.0% from 25 to 44, 18.5% from 45 to 64, and 7.4% who were 65 years of age or older. The median age was 30 years. For every 100 females there were 106.6 males. For every 100 females age 18 and over, there were 103.0 males.

The median income for a household in the town was $30,750, and the median income for a family was $36,094. Males had a median income of $23,393 versus $18,571 for females. The per capita income for the town was $11,434. Below the poverty line were 15.6% of people, 11.2% of families, 12.2% of those under 18 and 15.6% of those over 64.

== Government and infrastructure ==
The government for the town of Alto is housed in a structure with an unusual history. When the new Cornelia Bank was built in nearby Cornelia in the late 1970s, the small building housing the old remote drive-in teller windows was moved to its current location on a lot across Georgia Hwy 441 from the Riegel Textile Mill (now Mt. Vernon Mills) in Alto and converted for office use.

The Georgia Department of Corrections operates the Arrendale State Prison in unincorporated Habersham County, near Alto.

== Education ==
The portion in Banks County is in the Banks County School District. Students in that portion are zoned to Banks County High School.

The portion in Habersham County is in the Habersham County School District.
