= Sabrina Van Tassel =

French-American journalist and director

Sabrina Van Tassel (born 1975, Neuilly-sur-Seine) is a French-American journalist and director.

== Filmography ==
=== Director ===
- 2002 : Oya isola (short film)
- 2004 : Husbands for the Worst (short film)
- 2010 : The Lost Soldiers of the IDF (short film)
- 2008 : The Rivka Tribe (short film)
- 2014: The Silenced Walls
- 2017 : Women On Death Row (short film)
- 2020 : The State of Texas vs. Melissa

=== Actress ===
- 1996 : Coup de vice dir. Patrick Levy
- 1997 : La Vérité si je mens ! dir. Thomas Gilou
- 1999 : The Parasites dir. Philippe de Chauveron
- 2001 : La Vérité si je mens ! 2 dir. Thomas Gilou
- 2001 : Two Days, Nine Lives dir. Simon Monjack
