= List of women on death row in the United States =

This is a list of women on death row in the United States. The number of death row inmates fluctuates daily with new convictions, appellate decisions overturning conviction or sentence alone, commutations, or deaths (through execution or otherwise). Due to this fluctuation as well as lag and inconsistencies in inmate reporting procedures across jurisdictions, the information in this article may be out of date. The time on death row counter starts on the day they were first placed on death row. It does not count time incarcerated prior to sentencing nor does it discount time spent in prison off death row in cases where death sentences were overturned before being reinstated.

Demographics of women subjected to extreme sentences like the death penalty or life without parole, known as virtual death sentences, are highly skewed towards women of color. A 2021 national study by The Sentencing Project shows that one in every 39 Black women in prison is serving life without parole, while their white female counterparts have a rate of one in every 59. This is further exacerbated in southern states of the U.S. like Mississippi (one in 12), or in Louisiana where one in 14 Black women in prison have a LWOP (life without parole) sentence. Latin American women make up 6% of the national total of LWOP sentences being served by women, however, states like New York or Texas have more than 20% of their Latin American prison population sentenced to life without parole.

As of 2026, there are 45 women awaiting execution in the United States overall.

== Alabama ==
| Name | Description of crime | Time on death row | Other |
|---|---|---|---|
| Patricia Blackmon | Blackmon was convicted in the death of her two-year-old adopted daughter, Dominiqua Bryant. According to an autopsy report, the child suffered a fractured skull, several broken bones, bruises and a shoeprint on her chest. | 24 years, 5 months and 2 days | Because the victim was under the age of 14, Blackmon was eligible for the death penalty. She argued in her appeal that an age-based statute was unconstitutional. In 2009, Blackmon's petition to the United States Supreme Court for a writ of certiorari was denied. |
| Tierra Capri Gobble | Gobble was convicted in the death of her four-month-old son, Phoenix Cody Parrish. According to a coroner's report, the infant suffered extensive bruising, and fractures of the skull, ribs and wrists. The cause of death was determined to be head trauma consistent with child abuse. | 20 years, 11 months and 8 days | In 2013, Gobble's petition to the United States Supreme Court for a writ of certiorari was denied. |
| Lisa Leanne Graham | In 2015, Graham was convicted of capital murder for persuading a family friend to gun Graham's daughter down on a remote dirt road in Russell County in 2007. Graham was sentenced to death. | 10 years, 11 months and 22 days | Graham's lead attorney, Margaret Young Brown, argued that psychologist and attorney Glen King's evaluation showed that Graham had "borderline intellectual functioning," which cast doubt on her capacity to make reasonable decisions. In 2020, Graham's petition for a writ of certiorari and motion for leave was denied by the United States Supreme Court. |
| Heather Leavell-Keaton | In March and June 2010, Leavell-Keaton murdered her common-law husband's children, three-year-old Chase DeBlase and four-year-old Natalie DeBlase. Prosecutors allege that she put antifreeze in the children's food and choked them both to death. | 11 years, 2 months and 20 days | In 2014, Leavell-Keaton's husband John DeBlase was also sentenced to death. She is the first woman sentenced to death in Mobile County. |
| Christie Michelle Scott | In August 2008, a blaze broke out at the home of Christie Michelle Scott in Russellville, Alabama, killing her six-year-old son, Mason. Scott had purchased a $100,000 life insurance policy on her son 12 hours before his death. She was convicted of both the arson and the murder. | 18 years, 3 months and 4 days | Mason had been diagnosed with multiple psychiatric disorders, including attention deficit hyperactivity disorder, oppositional defiant disorder, and pervasive developmental disorder. |

== Arizona ==
| Name | Description of crime | Time on death row | Other |
|---|---|---|---|
| Sammantha Allen | On July 12, 2011, police officers were called to 10-year-old Ame Deal's home, where she was found dead in a small plastic container, having suffocated. Ame lived with a number of relatives, including her aunt and legal guardian, Cynthia Stoltzmann. Allen was Stoltzmann's daughter. The family first told the police officers that Ame was playing hide-n-seek and locked herself in the trunk the night before, after the adults went to sleep. During interrogation, Sammantha and her husband John confessed to locking Ame in the trunk as a form of punishment, because she took a popsicle without permission. | 9 years, 3 months and 2 days | Ame, who was 50 inches (130 cm) and 59 pounds (27 kg) had to be squeezed into the trunk since its dimensions were only 3 feet (91 cm) by 14 inches (36 cm), and 1 foot (30 cm) deep. Before Ame was squeezed into the trunk, she was forced to do jumping jacks, backbends, and run around in 103 °F (39 °C) heat for over an hour. She was then padlocked inside the trunk. The state alleges that Ame Deal suffered horrific abuse throughout her life. John Allen was also sentenced to death. |
| Wendi Andriano | Andriano was convicted of the murder of her husband Joe Andriano. Her 33-year-old husband Joe was bludgeoned and stabbed to death in the couple's apartment in Ahwatukee, Arizona. His autopsy revealed that he had sustained 23 blows to the skull, and traces of sodium azide (a toxin similar in activity to cyanide) were also found in his system. | 21 years, 10 months and 18 days | Joe Andriano was terminally ill at the time of his death. In 2007, Andriano's petition to the United States Supreme Court for a writ of certiorari was denied. |
| Shawna Forde | Shawna Forde and her accomplices entered the Flores home by claiming they were officials looking for fugitives. The suspects had the expectation of finding money and drugs that could be sold to finance Forde's vigilante nativist group, Minutemen American Defense (MAD), which patrolled Arizona's border with Mexico. When they found no drugs, the intruders took inexpensive jewelry and fatally shot 29-year-old Raul Flores Jr. and his daughter, nine-year-old Brisenia Ylianna Flores. | 15 years, 8 months and 18 days | Forde was active in the Minuteman movement, a grassroots anti-illegal immigration group that would station themselves along the U.S. southern border, keep watch for Mexicans crossing the border illegally, and then alert the Border Patrol. Forde allegedly boasted of robbing drug dealers to finance the movement. Prosecutors alleged Forde and her associates entered the trailer disguised as government officials looking for fugitives. No drugs were found in the trailer. In 2014, Forde's petition to the United States Supreme Court for a writ of certiorari was denied. |

== California ==
| Name | Description of crime | Time on death row | Other |
|---|---|---|---|
| Rosie Alfaro | On June 15, 1990, 9-year-old Autumn Wallace was stabbed to death. Prosecutors say 18-year-old Alfaro, an acquaintance of the family, robbed the house for drug money, and killed Wallace so she would not be identified. | 34 years, 3 months and 26 days | In August 2007, the California Supreme Court voted unanimously to uphold Alfaro's death sentence. |
| Socorro "Cora" Caro | Caro was convicted of shooting and killing three of her four young sons as they slept. The youngest child, who was 1 at the time, was unharmed. She then turned the gun on herself in a suicide attempt. Although she suffered a gunshot wound to the head, she survived after two surgeries. | 24 years, 7 months and 4 days | Caro, who says she has no memory of that night, claims a history of physical abuse by her husband. In 2020, Caro's petition to the United States Supreme Court for a writ of certiorari was denied. |
| Celeste Carrington | Carrington admitted to the fatal shooting of Victor Esparanza, janitor at a shoe factory, in January 1992, and Caroline Gleason, a property manager at a real estate office in Palo Alto, in another robbery two months later. Five days after killing Gleason, she shot and wounded Allan Marks, a Redwood City pediatrician, during a robbery of his office. | 31 years, 11 months and 17 days | Carrington was raised in poverty in Philadelphia, Pennsylvania, where she was abused by both parents. After years of sexual abuse by her father, she became pregnant with his child at age 14. In 2010, Carrington's petition to the United States Supreme Court for a writ of certiorari was denied. |
| Cynthia Coffman | Along with her boyfriend James Marlow, Coffman was convicted of the kidnappings, robberies and murders of Sandra Neary, Pamela Simmons, Corinna Novis and Lynel Murray in October and November 1986. Novis and Murray were sexually assaulted by Marlow. | 37 years, 2 months and 9 days | Coffman was the first woman to receive a death sentence in California since the reinstatement of the death penalty in that state in 1977. James Marlow was also sentenced to death. In 2005, Coffman's petition to the United States Supreme Court for a writ of certiorari was denied. |
| Kerry Lyn Dalton | Dalton was convicted of torturing and murdering Irene Louise in 1988 at a mobile home park in Live Oak Springs, California. She and three others, Mark Lee Tompkins, Sheryl Ann Baker, and another man known only by the name "George", were alleged to have used various weapons to commit a torture-murder: a cast-iron frying pan, a knife, and a syringe filled with battery acid. | 31 years, 5 months and 17 days | Dalton's sister, Victoria Thorpe, has spent years campaigning for Dalton's release, insisting she is innocent, that no body was ever found, and that the conviction was based solely on hearsay "confessions" provided to investigator Richard Cooksey. In 2019, Dalton's petition to the United States Supreme Court for a writ of certiorari was denied. |
| Skylar Preciosa Deleon | Deleon was convicted of the murder of Thomas and Jackie Hawks, a married couple, on November 15, 2004. Along with her ex-wife and two other men, Deleon convinced the Hawks to test-drive their yacht at sea. Far from the yacht harbor, she and her accomplices gagged and tied the couple to an anchor on the yacht and threw them overboard, the bodies of the Hawks have never been found. Deleon was also accused of killing John Jarvi, a resident of Anaheim, California, who was found dead in Mexico in 2003. | 17 years, 6 months and 30 days | Convicted and sentenced under the name Skylar Julius Deleon; transitioned from male to female while incarcerated. |
| Veronica Gonzales | Along with her husband Ivan, Gonzales was convicted of the 1995 scalding death of her 4-year-old niece, Genevieve Rojas. She was convicted of first-degree murder with special circumstances of torture and mayhem. They are the first married couple in California on death row for the same crime. | 28 years, 4 months and 20 days | Rojas was sent to live with Gonzales in 1995 because her mother was in drug rehabilitation and her father was in jail for child molestation. Testimony from the trial detailed a long history of abuse, including being forced to live in a box, hung by her hands from a hook in a closet and burned with a hair dryer. In 2012, Gonzales' petition to the United States Supreme Court for a writ of certiorari was denied. |
| Jessica Hann | Hann was sentenced to death for the murder of her two-month-old daughter Montana in 2001, who was beaten to death. Hann was also convicted of murdering her six-week-old son Jason in 1999, who was also beaten to death. | 12 years, 8 months and 19 days | Convicted and sentenced under the name Jason Michael Hann; transitioned from male to female while incarcerated. |
| Lorraine Hunter | Hunter shot her husband in an effort to gain money from life insurance policies. | 8 years, 11 months and 1 day | |
| Cherie Lash-Rhoades | Lash-Rhoades shot six people at the Cedarville Rancheria Tribal Office in Alturas, ultimately killing four on February 20, 2014. Officials said at least one of the injured was also attacked with a butcher knife after Lash-Rhoades ran out of ammunition. | 9 years, 6 months and 20 days | |
| Belinda Magana | Separate juries concluded in January 2015 that Magana, a mother from Corona, and her boyfriend Naresh Marine deserved the death penalty for the May 2009 murder of her toddler son Malachi who was scalded and subjected to beatings before he died five days later. | 11 years, 6 months and 1 day | |
| Valerie Dee Martin | Along with her 16-year-old son, a 14-year-old boy, and 27-year-old ex-convict Christopher Kenney, Martin was convicted in the death of her boyfriend, 61-year-old William Whiteside, who was knocked out and put into the trunk of his car, which was then set ablaze. | 16 years, 7 months and 14 days | |
| Maureen "Miki" McDermott | McDermott was convicted of hiring an orderly at the hospital where she worked to kill her roommate, Stephen Matthew Eldridge. Prosecutors allege the motive was to collect mortgage insurance on a house they co-owned. In addition to having been repeatedly stabbed, Eldridge's penis was severed post mortem. The orderly testified that this was done at McDermott's insistence, in order to make it appear that the killing was a "homosexual murder" because, in theory, the police would be unlikely to investigate it thoroughly. | 36 years, 5 months and 1 day | McDermott appealed the sentence on the basis that no African-Americans served on her jury. It is illegal to strike jurors on the basis of race. Her appeal was denied. In 2003, McDermott's petition to the United States Supreme Court for a writ of certiorari was denied. |
| Michelle Lyn Michaud | Michaud and her boyfriend James Anthony Daveggio were convicted of luring a 22-year-old woman into a specially rigged van where they sexually tortured and strangled her before dumping her body on a snowy embankment. | 24 years, 1 month and 15 days | In addition to the 2002 murder and rape of their victim, 22-year-old Vanessa Samson, the couple had previously raped and abused five girls including Michaud's 13-year-old daughter. She and other victims turned to the police and during questioning for their crimes, Samson's body was found. In trial, both Michaud and Daveggio were found guilty and they both received the death penalty. In 2018, Michaud's petition to the United States Supreme Court for a writ of certiorari was denied. |
| Tanya "Phuong Thao Nguyen" Nelson | Nelson was convicted in the stabbing deaths of fortune teller Ha "Jade" Smith, and her daughter Anita Vo. | 16 years, 6 months and 17 days | Co-defendant Phillipe Zamora testified that Nelson and he killed Smith when Nelson's fortune did not come true. Smith allegedly told Nelson that her business would flourish if she relocated from Orange County to North Carolina. Nelson ended up losing her home. Zamora testified that Nelson told him on the flight over that she felt cheated. |
| Brooke Marie Rottiers | Prosecutors alleged that Rottiers, who sometimes engaged in sex work, lured two men to her motel room pretext of sex before she robbed, beat and suffocated them. The victims were found with panties and other cloth items stuffed in their mouths; their mouths and noses were covered and taped over. They were hog-tied with cords around their necks, connected to their hands (which were behind their backs) and to their ankles. | 16 years and 18 days | |
| Cathy Lynn Sarinana | Sarinana and her husband Raul were convicted in the respective August and December 2005 deaths of her nephews Conrad (13) and Ricky Morales (11), who were in their custody. | 17 years, 4 months and 14 days | |
| Janeen Snyder | Janeen Snyder and Michael Thornton were convicted of kidnapping, torturing, sexually abusing and killing 16-year-old Michelle Curran in 2001. | 20 years, 2 months and 2 days | Two other teenage girls testified against Snyder that she had lured them to a hotel where Thornton raped them. Snyder also confessed to killing a 14-year-old girl who had been missing for over five years. |
| Manling Tsang Williams (曾玫琳 Zēng Méilín) | Williams was convicted of smothering her two young children with a pillow and slashing her husband to death with a sword in the family's Rowland Heights home in 2007. | 14 years, 9 months and 22 days | |

== Florida ==
| Name | Description of crime | Time on death row | Other |
|---|---|---|---|
| Tina Lasonya Brown | Brown was convicted of beating 19-year-old Audreanna Zimmerman with a crowbar, shocking her with a stun gun and then setting her on fire in Brown's family home. Brown's daughter Britnee Miller, then 16, told the judge at her own trial that the plan was to fight Zimmerman, but it escalated out of control. The attack was said to be the result of a disagreement over a man. After beating her and using the stun gun, the trio put Zimmerman in the trunk of a car, drove her to a wooded area, doused her with gasoline and set her on fire. Zimmerman was able to run to a nearby home and call 911 with severe burns across 60 percent of her body. She died two weeks later. | 14 years, 1 month and 11 days | Brown acknowledged that she committed the crime and expressed remorse over the event. Mitigating factors presented at trial included a rough childhood in which she was sexually abused by her father, abandoned by her mother, and kicked out of the house by her grandmother for reporting the sexual abuse. Her father ran a gang-related drug operation out of their home. She also had a long-term dependency on cocaine, which the defense asserted impacted her judgment. In 2014, Brown's petition to the United States Supreme Court for a writ of certiorari was denied. |

== Georgia ==
| Name | Description of crime | Time on death row | Other |
|---|---|---|---|
| Tiffany Moss | Moss was convicted in 2019 of starving to death her 10-year-old stepdaughter, Emani Moss. | 7 years, 6 months and 18 days | |

== Idaho ==
| Name | Description of crime | Time on death row | Other |
|---|---|---|---|
| Robin Lee Row | Row was convicted of the 1992 deaths of her husband and two children. Prosecutors say she set the family home on fire in order to collect insurance money. | 32 years, 10 months and 24 days | Robin Row had two other children. In 1977, one, a 15-month-old daughter, died supposedly of SIDS in New Hampshire. The other, a six-year-old, died in Northern California in a cabin fire in 1980. Both deaths have been re-investigated because of the murders of her most recent two children. Despite claiming innocence, Robin Row confessed to killing her husband and two children in the fire during the sentence phase of her trial in Idaho. She tried to blame a man whom she was having an affair with as being a codefendant. He was ruled not responsible. |

== Kentucky ==
| Name | Description of crime | Time on death row | Other |
|---|---|---|---|
| Virginia Susan Caudill | Caudill was convicted of the 1998 death of a 73-year-old woman. Prosecutors allege that Caudill and an accomplice entered the home of Lonetta White, beat her to death and then burglarized her home. They then placed her body in the trunk of her own vehicle and drove her to a rural area in Fayette County and set the car on fire. | 26 years, 7 months and 16 days | The motive for the burglary was said to be money to buy cocaine. In 2010, Caudill's petition to the United States Supreme Court for a writ of certiorari was denied. |

== Louisiana ==
| Name | Description of crime | Time on death row | Other |
|---|---|---|---|
| Antoinette Frank | Antoinette Frank was a New Orleans police officer when she and Rogers LaCaze killed Officer Ronald Williams and siblings Ha and Cuong Vu, owners of the Kim Anh restaurant, during a 1995 robbery. | 31 years and 20 days | In 2007, Frank's petition to the United States Supreme Court for a writ of certiorari was denied. |

== Mississippi ==
| Name | Description of crime | Time on death row | Other |
|---|---|---|---|
| Lisa Jo Chamberlin | Chamberlin, along with Roger Lee Gillett, was convicted in the March 2004 deaths of Linda Heintzelman and Heintzelman's boyfriend, Vernon Hulett. Their bodies were found inside a freezer at an abandoned farm near Russell, Kansas. | 20 years, 3 months and 4 days | In both 2008 and 2018, Chamberlin's petitions to the United States Supreme Court for writs of certiorari were denied. |

== North Carolina ==
| Name | Description of crime | Time on death row | Other |
|---|---|---|---|
| Blanche Taylor Moore | Blanche Taylor Moore was convicted of killing her boyfriend by slipping arsenic into his food. Moore is suspected of killing three other people and nearly killing another in the same manner. | 35 years, 9 months and 22 days | Moore appealed her sentence citing the Racial Justice Act, which allows death-row inmates to use statistics and other evidence to prove racial bias played a significant role in them getting a death sentence. The Racial Justice Act was repealed in 2013, and Moore has lost all her other appeals. |
| Carlette Parker | Parker was a home health-care worker taking care of 88-year-old Alice Covington. She allegedly withdrew approximately $44,000 from Covington's account. When Covington confronted her, Parker is alleged to have killed her by drowning her in a bathtub. The autopsy revealed bruising around Covington's ankles and legs, pepper spray on her clothing, and possible burns from a stun gun. At the time of her arrest, Parker had a stun gun and pepper spray in her possession. | 27 years, 7 months and 8 days | In 2002, Parker's petition to the United States Supreme Court for a writ of certiorari was denied. |

== Ohio ==
| Name | Description of crime | Time on death row | Other |
|---|---|---|---|
| Victoria Drain | Drain was convicted of the murder of her cellmate, Christopher Richardson. Prosecutors say that Drain hit him on the head with a fan motor, stabbed him with a pencil and strangled him to death. | 6 years, 5 months and 21 days | Drain had previously been convicted of the murder of Randy L. Grose and was sentenced to 30 years to life in prison. Transitioned from male to female while incarcerated. |

== Oklahoma ==
| Name | Description of crime | Time on death row | Other |
|---|---|---|---|
| Brenda Evers Andrew | Brenda Andrew and her lover James Pavatt were convicted of the murder of Brenda's husband, Robert Andrew, who was shot twice with a 16 gauge shotgun, Pavatt firing the first shot and Brenda the second shot. | 22 years, 1 month and 18 days | Shortly before the murder, Robert was nearly killed when the brake lines on his car were cut. He filed a police report claiming that his wife and Pavatt were conspiring to kill him for the insurance money. Pavatt was their life insurance agent. No action was taken by police at that time. |

== Tennessee ==
| Name | Description of crime | Time on death row | Other |
|---|---|---|---|
| Christa Pike | In 1995, 18-year-old Christa Pike lured out her fellow Job Corps trainee, 19-year-old Colleen Slemmer, to an isolated section of the University of Tennessee agricultural campus, spurred on by the belief that Slemmer was trying to steal her boyfriend, Tadaryl Shipp. Pike bashed her head with a chunk of asphalt and kept a piece of the skull as a souvenir. | 30 years, 7 months and 10 days | The neurologist Jonathan Henry Pincus testified that Pike's brain damage made killing inevitable. Pincus stated that every killer he has ever examined shares three features – brain damage, a history of abuse, and mental illness. Pike has all three. He testified that Pike likely has bipolar disorder, her frontal lobe was distinctly abnormal, she had brain damage that likely resulted from pre-natal alcohol exposure, and she also has a long history of physical and sexual abuse. In 2012, Pike's petition to the United States Supreme Court for a writ of certiorari was denied. |

== Texas ==
| Name | Description of crime | Time on death row | Other |
|---|---|---|---|
| Kimberly Cargill | Cargill was convicted of the 2010 murder of her children's babysitter, Cherry Walker. Prosecutors say Walker was scheduled to testify in Cargill's child custody hearing. | 14 years, 5 months and 2 days | Many family members testified against Cargill. Three of Cargill's four sons testified that Cargill would frequently choke, kick and hit them and that she changed the locks on their bedroom doors so she could lock them inside. Cargill's ex-husbands also took the stand, one of whom testified that Cargill set his apartment on fire. In 2017, Cargill's petition to the United States Supreme Court for a writ of certiorari was denied. |
| Linda Carty | Carty was convicted for the abduction and murder of 25-year-old Joana Rodriguez, in order to steal her newborn son. Prosecutors alleged that Carty orchestrated the crime, which was committed by three masked men who abducted Rodriguez and her son. Rodriguez was later found dead in the trunk of a car. Her 3-day-old son was rescued from a car parked nearby. The other three men were arrested, but only Carty was prosecuted for capital murder. | 24 years, 8 months and 2 days | Carty claims she was framed by drug dealers in response to her work as an informant and has appealed her conviction. Her appeals have been unsuccessful and the appeal procedure has been exhausted. Barring the granting of clemency, she stands to become the first female British national to be executed since Ruth Ellis in 1955, and the first British black woman executed in more than a century. In 2014, key witnesses against her, including a DEA agent for whom she worked as an informant, recanted and claimed they were coerced into testifying against her by the prosecutor. Retired DEA Special Agent Charles Mathis accused prosecutor Connie Spence with threatening to allege in court that he had had an affair with Carty. Mathis denies the affair, but was concerned the effect it would have on his career. Two of Carty's co-defendants accuse prosecutors of threatening them with the death sentence and of feeding them stories implicating Carty. Her co-defendant, Chris Robinson, testified against her at her trial, but has since recanted, claiming that prosecutors coerced him to testify that he saw Carty put a trash bag over Rodriguez's head when Rodriguez was in the trunk, claiming the story is untrue. "When we were rehearsing I would say the story back to them they would stop me and add something in or take it out then make me keep going. They would stop me by saying 'Wait, wait, this is what happened,' " he said in his affidavit. Capital murder charges were dropped against Robinson in exchange for his testimony. Another co-defendant, Gerald Anderson, who was not called to testify, alleged that prosecutors attempted to get him to testify falsely against Carty as well. In 2009, Carty's petition to the United States Supreme Court for a writ of certiorari, and a rehearing on the matter, were both denied. |
| Brittany Holberg | Brittany Holberg was convicted of the November 13, 1996, robbery and murder of 80-year-old A.B. Towery Sr. in his southwest Amarillo home. | 28 years, 7 months and 13 days | Holberg, engaged in sex work at the time, was hired by Towery. During the trial, defense attorney Catherine Brown Dodson argued that Towery was wrongly portrayed as an innocent elderly man, and that Holberg acted in self-defense when Towery attacked her. Dodson said A.B. Towery became angry and violent when he found a crack pipe on Holberg. She told the jury that Towery struck Holberg twice in the head with a metal pan while her back was turned, and then threatened her with a knife. Holberg reacted by stabbing him with her own knife, and the fight escalated until Holberg put the lamp post in his mouth to attempt to end the struggle. Holberg believed she would have little legal recourse because of her status as a drug-abusing sex worker and fled to Tennessee. Testimony showed that A.B. Towery, the victim, also had a problem with drugs. Since her conviction, Holberg has spoken out about the death penalty, has talked of abuse in the Texas Criminal Justice system, and has called for better conditions for prisoners. In 2001, Holberg's petition to the United States Supreme Court for a writ of certiorari was denied. |
| Melissa Lucio | Lucio was convicted in the murder of her 2-year-old daughter, one of her nine children. The woman told authorities the child had fallen down the stairs, but physicians in the ER found she had bruises covering her body, bite marks on her back, an arm that had been broken weeks earlier, and was missing hair that had been pulled by the roots from her head. | 18 years, 2 months and 28 days | In 2012, Caro's petition to the United States Supreme Court for a writ of certiorari was denied. Texas' highest criminal court on April 25, 2022, delayed the execution of Lucio, the only Latina on the state's death row, who was set to die April 27, 2022. |
| Taylor Rene Parker | Parker was convicted for the October 2020 slaying of her pregnant friend Reagan Simmons-Hancock and her unborn daughter Braxlynn Sage Hancock. Parker stabbed Simmons-Hancock over 100 times in the victim's house before she cut open her womb to steal the unborn child. | 4 years | Prosecutors believed the motive was that the defendant murdered the victim to steal her baby as an elaborate plan for the defendant to keep her boyfriend after she lied about being pregnant herself. |
| Darlie Routier | Routier was convicted in the 1996 stabbing of her two young sons, Damon and Devon. Routier herself was wounded. She maintains the attack was by an intruder. The prosecutor maintains Routier's wounds were self-inflicted and she was the perpetrator. Routier's infant son and her husband were asleep upstairs and were unharmed. | 29 years, 9 months and 5 days | Routier's conviction has come into question in recent years. She was convicted largely on the basis of the testimony of bloodstain analyst Tom Bevel, who has played a role in several recently discovered wrongful convictions. Other crime scene experts have publicly criticized the case against Routier and one juror has publicly stated that he now believes she is innocent. Routier is collecting funds to perform new DNA testing on evidence at the crime scene and wrongful conviction advocacy group Investigating Innocence has taken her case. David Camm, who himself was wrongfully convicted on the basis of Bevel's testimony, is investigating her case. In 2004, Routier's petition to the United States Supreme Court for a writ of certiorari was denied. |
| Erica Yvonne Sheppard | Along with James Dickerson, Sheppard was convicted of killing Marilyn Meagher as part of a robbery. | 31 years, 8 months and 6 days | In 2014, Sheppard's petition to the United States Supreme Court for a writ of certiorari was denied. In 2020, her final petition for certiorari was denied. |

== See also ==
- List of death row inmates in the United States
- List of death row inmates in the United States who have exhausted their appeals
- List of women executed in the United States since 1976
- Sex differences in crime
