= Murders of Harold and Joey Pugh =

1997 double murder of a father and son in Cane Creek, Alabama

- 2016 ADOC mugshot of Thomas Dale Ferguson, one of the two men sent to death row for the Cane Creek double murder
- Date: July 20, 1997
- Location: Cane Creek Canyon Nature Preserve, Alabama, U.S.
- Deaths: Harold Alan Pugh, 41; Joey Alan Pugh, 11
- Convicted: Thomas Dale Ferguson, 23; Michael Craig Maxwell, 25; Mark David Moore, 35; Keno Fleando Graham, 24; Donald Ray Risley, 23
- Convictions: Capital murder (Ferguson and Maxwell); Murder (Moore and Graham); First-degree robbery (Risley)
- Sentence: Ferguson; Death (1998); Maxwell; Death (1998); Moore; Life imprisonment (1998); Graham; Life imprisonment (1998); Risley; 15 years' imprisonment (1998)

On July 20, 1997, during a fishing trip in Cane Creek, Alabama, 41-year-old Harold Alan Pugh (May 12, 1956 – July 20, 1997) and his 11-year-old son Joey Alan Pugh (June 22, 1986 – July 20, 1997) were attacked by a group of five men, who wanted to steal the Pughs' truck as their getaway vehicle in an upcoming bank robbery plan. The Pughs were shot to death by two of the five bank robbers, Michael Craig Maxwell (born November 26, 1971) and Thomas Dale Ferguson (born July 20, 1973), and their bodies were found a day later upstream from the Cane Creek Boat Ramp floating in the creek itself.

Ferguson, Maxwell and their three accomplices were all arrested and charged with murdering the father-son pair. Out of the five, Donald Ray Risley testified against the others and pleaded guilty to first-degree robbery in exchange for not being charged with murder, and sentenced to 15 years in prison. As for the remaining four, both Keno Fleando Graham and Mark David Moore were sentenced to life in prison for murder, while both Ferguson and Maxwell were found guilty of capital murder and sentenced to death; Ferguson's sentence attracted the most attention as the judge handed him the death penalty after overruling the jury's recommendation for life without parole by a 11–1 vote.

Currently, both Ferguson and Maxwell remain on death row at the Holman Correctional Facility. Moore and Graham are still serving life at different prisons in Alabama. Risley was released from prison in 2012.

== Murders of the Pughs ==
On July 20, 1997, at the Cane Creek Boat ramp near the Barton industrial park area of Colbert County, Alabama, a father-son pair were robbed and murdered by a group of five men.

On that day itself, 41-year-old Harold Alan Pugh and his 11-year-old eldest son Joey Alan Pugh were fishing together at the creek when they were targeted by their attackers. Earlier on, the five men – 23-year-old Thomas Dale Ferguson, 25-year-old Michael Craig Maxwell, 35-year-old Mark David Moore, 24-year-old Keno Fleando Graham and 23-year-old Donald Ray "Donnie" Risley – planned to commit bank robbery in Belmont, Mississippi, and also bought clothes and weapons (including firearms) to facilitate their plan. The robbers were looking to steal a car as a get-away vehicle, and upon seeing the truck of the Pughs, the five men decided to attack the father-son pair and steal the truck.

After the Pughs arrived at the shore and left their fishing boat for the truck, Maxwell approached the pair and held both Harold and Joey at gunpoint, forcing both father and son back into their boat. Maxwell and the Pughs, later joined by Ferguson, got onto the boat and the four headed down the creek while the rest stayed behind with the Pughs' truck. While on the creek, both Maxwell and Ferguson gunned down the Pughs; Maxwell shot Joey to death while Ferguson killed Harold, and Maxwell delivered another shot at Harold after assuming that Harold did not die from the shooting. After murdering the Pughs, Ferguson and Maxwell left the creek to meet up with their accomplices and left the area with the Pughs' truck. The robbery was executed as planned by the five on July 21, 1997, and the five later abandoned the truck, which was doused in gasoline and burned by the robbers.

The Pughs were subsequently reported missing to the Colbert County Sheriff's Department. Some of the Pughs' friends went to look for the Pughs at Cane Creek after the missing person report was lodged, and later, the local authorities and a rescue squad took part in the search. The bodies of Harold and Joey Pugh were later discovered floating in the creek by , local volunteers assisting in the search. An autopsy confirmed that each victim were shot twice in the head, and died as a result of these wounds. The boat of the Pughs was found six days later on July 26, 1997, with one of its seats removed and two spent 9mm cartridges discovered alongside the belongings of the Pughs.

The five men were eventually arrested on August 21, 1997, a month after the double murder. Out of the five, both Thomas Ferguson and Michael Maxwell were charged and indicted for capital murder by a Colbert County grand jury in September 1997; the offence of capital murder carries the death penalty under Alabama state law, and the prosecution intended to seek the death penalty for both men. The remaining three were indicted for lesser charges of murder in November 1997.

== Trial of the perpetrators ==
=== Michael Craig Maxwell ===
Michael Craig Maxwell
- Born: November 26, 1971 (age 54); Alabama, U.S.
- Status: Incarcerated on death row in Alabama
- Motive: Robbery
- Conviction: Capital murder (×2)
- Penalty: Death

Details
- Victims: Harold Pugh, 41; Joey Pugh, 11
- Date: July 20, 1997
- Location: Alabama
- Imprisoned at: Holman Correctional Facility

Out of the five murderers involved in the crime, Michael Maxwell was the first to stand trial for the double murder. His trial was scheduled on May 11, 1998.

On May 13, 1998, a Jefferson County jury found Maxwell guilty of capital murder.

On May 15, 1998, the jury returned with their verdict on sentence, and voted 10–2 in favor of capital punishment for Maxwell. Many of the family members and friends and teachers of both Harold and Joey Pugh were emotional at the verdict, with many agreeing that Maxwell deserved to die for the double murder. By Alabama state law, a defendant could be sentenced to death for a capital crime if at least ten out of 12 jurors voted for the death penalty.

On June 30, 1998, 26-year-old Michael Craig Maxwell was sentenced to death by Circuit Court Judge Inge Prytz Johnson.

=== Thomas Dale Ferguson ===
Thomas Dale Ferguson
- Born: July 20, 1973 (age 53); Alabama, U.S.
- Status: Incarcerated on death row in Alabama
- Motive: Robbery
- Conviction: Capital murder (×2)
- Penalty: Death

Details
- Victims: Harold Pugh, 41; Joey Pugh, 11
- Date: July 20, 1997
- Location: Alabama
- Imprisoned at: Holman Correctional Facility

After Maxwell, Thomas Ferguson was the second perpetrator to claim trial for charges of capital murder in relation to the killings. His trial began on June 22, 1998, before a jury at Colbert County Circuit Court.

Subsequently, the jury found Ferguson guilty of capital murder. However, on June 25, 1998, the jury decided on a majority vote of 11–1 that Ferguson should be sentenced to life in prison without the possibility of parole, in spite of the plea from prosecutors and the victims' families for the death penalty. The recommendation, however, was non-binding as the judge had the right to either adhere to the jury's verdict or exercise judicial override during sentencing.

On September 8, 1998, Colbert County Circuit Judge Pride Tompkins delivered his verdict on sentence. However, Tompkins overrode the jury's recommendation for a life term, and instead, he imposed the death penalty for 24-year-old Thomas Dale Ferguson, citing that the murders were heinous in nature and that Ferguson had the "opportunity to reflect and withdraw from his actions" but chose to not do so and went ahead with the fatal shootings of Harold and Joey Pugh. Reportedly, Harold's father and brother, and Joey's mother (Harold's ex-wife) expressed their satisfaction over the death sentence of Ferguson.

The death sentence of Ferguson garnered both attention and controversy over the years after his sentencing, given that Ferguson was still sentenced to death in spite of the jury's recommendation for life imprisonment, after the trial judge exercised the power of judicial override, and the law of judicial override was also criticized to be outdated and violated certain constitutional amendments (including the right to fair treatment of citizens).

In April 2017, the lawmakers of Alabama passed a new bill to abolish the power of judicial override, enabling the jury to have a final say on sentence in capital cases instead of judges, and Governor Kay Ivey signed the bill into law. However, the law was not retroactive and Ferguson's death sentence still stand. Later, a subsequent bill was petitioned to allow the law become retroactive and approve the re-sentencing of condemned killers affected by judicial override. This bill was, however, rejected by the state lawmakers. A report in May 2024 revealed that Ferguson was one of 30 prisoners who were sent to death row due to judicial override.

=== Others ===
Mark David Moore
- Born: 1962 (age 63–64); Alabama, U.S.
- Status: Incarcerated
- Motive: Robbery
- Conviction: Felony murder
- Penalty: Life imprisonment

Details
- Victims: Harold Pugh, 41; Joey Pugh, 11
- Date: July 20, 1997
- Location: Alabama

Keno Fleando Graham
- Born: 1973 (age 52–53); Alabama, U.S.
- Status: Incarcerated
- Motive: Robbery
- Conviction: Felony murder (×2)
- Penalty: Life imprisonment (x2)

Details
- Victims: Harold Pugh, 41; Joey Pugh, 11
- Date: July 20, 1997
- Location: Alabama

Donald Ray Risley
- Born: 1974 (age 51–52); Alabama, U.S.
- Status: Released
- Motive: Robbery
- Conviction: First-degree robbery
- Penalty: 15 years' imprisonment

Details
- Victims: Harold Pugh, 41; Joey Pugh, 11
- Date: July 20, 1997
- Location: Alabama

By August 1998, the remaining three offenders of the case – Mark David Moore, Keno Graham and Donald Risley – were tried in separate courts for their respective roles in the Cane Creek homicides.

Graham was found guilty of two counts of felony murder and handed two life sentences with the possibility of parole. Moore was similarly sentenced to life in prison (also with the chance of parole) after he pleaded guilty to one count of felony murder. As for Risley, he reached a plea deal with the prosecution and allowed to plead guilty to first-degree robbery, and to testify against his accomplices in court. As a result of his plea of guilt, Risley was sentenced to 15 years' imprisonment.

== Appeal process ==
=== Maxwell's appeals ===
On August 22, 1998, Colbert County Circuit Court Judge Inge Prytz Johnson turned down the appeal of Michael Maxwell for a new trial.

On May 26, 2000, the Alabama Court of Criminal Appeals dismissed Maxwell's appeal against his conviction and sentence.

In January 2006, Maxwell petitioned for a re-sentencing hearing, as he wanted to introduce new mitigating evidence, including allegations of past sexual abuse by his uncle in his childhood. According to Marilyn McWilliams, Joey Pugh's mother who followed the case, she remembered that Maxwell had originally vowed to not appeal his death sentence, as he was ready to face the consequences of his actions, before he changed his mind and filed for re-sentencing.

On February 26, 2008, Maxwell's appeal to reverse his conviction was denied by the Alabama Court of Criminal Appeals.

Afterwards, Maxwell filed a federal appeal to the U.S. District Court for the Northern District of Alabama on July 29, 2010. However, there was no ruling made to the appeal after it was briefed in March 2011, 2014 and 2024 respectively.

In March 2026, Alabama Attorney General Steve Marshall petitioned to the 11th Circuit Court of Appeals to direct the lower federal courts to resolve the federal appeals of Maxwell and three other inmates (including cop-killer Kerry Spencer) on Alabama's death row, and to lift the long delays to their appeals.

=== Ferguson's appeals ===
Like Maxwell, Thomas Ferguson filed a series of appeals against his death sentence.

On June 30, 2000, the Alabama Court of Criminal Appeals dismissed Ferguson's appeal against his conviction and sentence.

On July 6, 2001, the Alabama Supreme Court rejected Ferguson's follow-up appeal and therefore affirmed the decision by the Alabama Court of Criminal Appeals.

Subsequently, the Alabama Court of Criminal Appeals would reject Ferguson's second and third appeals on April 4, 2008, and January 16, 2009, respectively.

On July 21, 2014, Ferguson's federal appeal was denied by the U.S. District Court for the Northern District of Alabama.

On June 27, 2017, Ferguson's second appeal to the U.S. District Court for the Northern District of Alabama was also rejected.

On May 21, 2020, Ferguson filed a third appeal to the U.S. District Court for the Northern District of Alabama, but the appeal was rejected.

In June 2022, Ferguson was granted a special hearing at the 11th Circuit Court of Appeals, and he was allowed to proceed with his claims of having his constitutional rights violated, and the defence also asked to overturn the death sentence on these grounds of appeal. When the Pugh family received word of Ferguson's appeal, Matt McWilliams, the brother of one of the victims, Joey Pugh, stated that Ferguson deserved to remain on death row for murdering his brother and father; McWilliams revealed that his mother died in 2010 and he promised his mother to make sure that Ferguson was executed for killing his brother.

On June 7, 2023, the 11th Circuit Court of Appeals rejected Ferguson's appeal.

On February 20, 2024, Ferguson's final appeal was dismissed by the U.S. Supreme Court.

== Current status ==
Both Mark Moore and Keno Graham were present still behind bars serving their life sentences as of 2025. According to a November 2008 report, Moore was denied parole.

Donald Risley, who was given a 15-year jail term after turning state evidence against the others, was first assessed for parole in December 2005, but he was denied parole. A second parole hearing was held in July 2011, but the parole was again denied and as a result, Risley served the rest of his prison sentence and in the end, he was released from prison on August 9, 2012.

As of 2025, both Thomas Ferguson and Michael Maxwell remain on death row at the Holman Correctional Facility.

== Aftermath ==
When the murders happened, the community in Colbert County, Alabama, was rippled with shock over the brutality of the crime and the deaths of both Harold and Joey Pugh saddened their family and friends. In 1999, the community continued to remember the murders, and among them, Marilyn McWilliams, the ex-wife of Harold, stated she still visited the graves of her ex-husband and son and also went to Cane Creek, where she felt the closest to them. Iris Pugh, the second wife of Harold, stated that her daughter helped her cope with the loss of her husband and stepson, and she found it senseless that her husband and stepson died due to the men's desire to rob and get money. John Pugh, Harold's widowed father, also commented that he wished for the killers responsible for the deaths of his son and grandson to repent and hoped for both Ferguson and Maxwell to be executed even though he understood he might not live to see this happen.

Ronnie May, one of the police officers who investigated the crime, stated that he could never forget the images of the crime scene, and he was unable to comprehend why would someone had the mentality to murder a child, since he himself had one daughter. Police investigator Frank Brians stated that he personally knew Harold and Joey and went to the same church as the former, and considered the double murder as the most unforgettable case of murder he ever came across as an investigator, since he had seen the father-son pair going on their usual fishing for the last time before they were murdered. As for Maxwell's mother, she stated that she understood the plight of the victims' families, because her son's acts had not only harmed them but also his own kin; Maxwell's five-year-old son reportedly was not told of the truth behind his father's imprisonment despite knowing that his father went to prison for doing something bad.

The Cane Creek murders remained as one of the most notorious crimes to occur in Alabama.

== See also ==
- Capital punishment in Alabama
- List of death row inmates in the United States § Alabama
- List of solved missing person cases: 1950–1999
