= Holman Correctional Facility =

Prison and execution center in Atmore, Alabama, United States

Coordinates: 31.1343°N 87.4497°W

- Interactive map of Holman Correctional Facility
- Location: Atmore, Alabama
- Status: Open
- Security class: Maximum
- Capacity: 1,002
- Opened: December 1969
- Managed by: Alabama Department of Corrections
- Warden: Terry Raybon

William C. Holman Correctional Facility is an Alabama Department of Corrections prison located in Atmore, Alabama, United States. The facility is along Alabama State Highway 21.

The facility was originally built to house 581 inmates. Holman held as many as 1,000 prisoners. It has 632 general population beds, 200 single cells, and 170 death row cells, for a capacity of 1,002 maximum through minimum-custody inmates, including a large contingent of life without parole inmates. The death chamber is located at Holman, where all state executions are conducted. Holman also operates two major correctional industries within the facility's perimeter: a license plate plant and a sewing factory.

Holman Correctional Facility was the subject of a documentary on MSNBC entitled Lockup: Holman Extended Stay (2006). The warden at Holman Correctional Facility at the time was Grantt Culliver, who served from 2002 from 2009. The current warden is Terry Raybon.

In 2016 the prison had the reputation of being the most violent in the country, due to overcrowding and understaffing. That year the Department of Justice initiated an investigation at the prison into conditions for both prisoners and officers.

== History ==
Opened during December 1969, Holman originally had a basic capacity for 520 medium-custody inmates, including a death row cellblock with a capacity of 20. It was constructed for $5,000,000 during the administration of Governor Lurleen Wallace and Alabama Department of Corrections Commissioner James T. Hagan. The prisoners of the old Kilby Prison were moved to Holman Prison. It was named in honor of a former warden, William C. Holman.

Due in part to legislative rules creating long-term penalties for drug crimes, the prison population at Holman and other facilities began to climb in the 1970s. On Friday August 29, 1975, two U.S. federal district court judges, William Brevard Hand and Frank M. Johnson Jr., ordered Alabama authorities to stop sending any more prisoners to Holman, Fountain Correctional Facility, Draper Correctional Facility, and the Medical and Diagnostic Center, due to overcrowding; the four prisons, designed to hold 2,212 prisoners, were holding about 3,800.

Since Holman opened, it gained a reputation for being the most violent prison in Alabama, a situation exacerbated by the years of overcrowding. In 1974 an employee was killed by an inmate with a knife. In 1985 a large riot occurred in which 22 men were taken hostage.

=== 2000s ===
Staff and prisoners said that after Grantt Culliver became the warden in 2002, violence decreased. This was covered in the documentary Lockup: Holman Correctional Facility (2006), which MSNBC produced. Hillary Heath, the inside producer of Lockup, said that it is difficult for reputations to die down, so Holman still has a reputation for violence.

The city of Atmore annexed the land in the prison in 2008, in accordance with a request from the state department of corrections.

=== 2016 ===
By 2016 violence had increased again. The 2016 U.S. prison strike started here at Holman correctional facility and spread to more than 10 states.The prison strike wanted to increase wages for prison labor and improve conditions across prisons in the United States.

Riots broke out in protest against conditions in March 2016. In the first riot fires were set in a prison dorm; both the warden and a prison guard sustained stab wounds. An individual recorded portions of the riot on a cell phone and posted the recordings to social media sites.

On September 1, 2016, Correctional Officer Kenneth Bettis died from a stab wound while performing his duties overseeing prisoners in the dining hall of the prison. Later that month, a group of corrections officers went on strike over safety concerns and overcrowding. Prisoners refer to the facility as a "slaughterhouse," as stabbings are a routine occurrence.

=== 2019 ===
Thirty inmates were transferred from St. Clair Correctional Facility. Eight of them were placed in solitary confinement, because warden Cynthia Smith said "significant safety and security concerns" to staff and other inmates would arise from them being placed in general population. Those eight men began a hunger strike on March 18, 2019, each stating that: "I am not suicidal, but I'm doing this because I'm being held in Holman Correctional Facility segregation without any justifiable reasons why."

=== 2020 ===
In late January 2020, the state announced most of the site would be closed due to severe deterioration of underground utilities that served the prison. Most inmates were moved from Holman to other facilities. However, death row and the execution chamber were to remain at Holman.

In July 2020, Department of Corrections Commissioner Jefferson Dunn provided an update to state legislators on the status of the state prison system. He stated that the current number of inmates being housed at Holman was 314 following the closure of much of the facility and relocation of many inmates.

== Operations ==
The Gulf Coast area, where Holman is located, often has temperatures of 100 °F (38 °C) and high humidity during summer. The prison administration has not installed air conditioning, so the prison has hundreds of industrial fans used for moving the air in an attempt to provide cooling. The hottest areas in the prison are the kitchen facilities.

Staff shortages are made worse by absenteeism. On some days, as few as nine guards are on duty, leaving guards in only two of the six towers on the perimeter. Annual staff turnover is reported to be 60 percent. As a result of a hiring freeze in 2014, mandatory overtime was commonly required for the guards.

In December 2018, press reports indicated the facility had only 72 of the 195 guards needed for routine operations without officers on overtime.

== Demographics ==
The prison has a capacity of over 800 prisoners. The state's death row has a capacity of 56 but in early 2017 held almost 200 men.

== Prisoner life ==
Hillary Heath, the inside producer of Lockup, said that when she asked prisoners to describe Holman, they used names like "The Slaughterhouse," "Slaughter Pen of the South," and "House of Pain," which referred to the frequent stabbings and violent attacks committed among the prisoners. The names "The Bottom" and "The Pit" refer to the prison's location in southern Alabama. One inmate said that, within the state, "you can't get any lower than this."

Heath reported that Holman inmates made "julep," a homegrown whiskey, using water, sugar, and yeast. She described julep as a brown liquid with dark floating chunks, resembling raw sewage. She said its odor "was not as vile as I imagined", and it smelled like sourdough bread and prunes.

Prisoners who commit indecent exposure violate rule #38, thus indecent exposure is referred to by inmates as "doing a '38'". Violating rule 38 of ADOC policy requires an inmate to attend sex addiction courses.

== Notable prisoners ==
Death row (does not include prisoners who were sent to Holman only for their executions):

- Westley Devon Harris – Convicted of murdering six members of his girlfriend's family in 2002.
- Henry Francis Hays – Convicted of the murder of Michael Donald – Alabama Institutional Serial #Z443 – Executed on June 6, 1997.
- Anthony Ray Hinton – Released after 30 years on death row for a crime he did not commit.
- Shonelle Jackson – Convicted of murder during the commission of a robbery.
- Joe Nathan James Jr. – Convicted of a 1994 murder – Executed on July 28, 2022.
- Courtney Lockhart – Convicted of the murder of Lauren Burk.
- Walter McMillian – Released after 6 years on death row for a crime he did not commit.
- Walter Leroy Moody – Convicted of the murder of Robert Smith Vance – Alabama Institutional Serial #00Z613 – Executed on April 19, 2018. At age 83, he is the oldest Alabama death row inmate to be executed since that State reinstated the death penalty in 1976.
- Devin Moore – Killed two police officers and a dispatcher at a police station after being arrested on suspicion of stealing a car.
- Matthew Reeves – Convicted of murder in 1998 – Executed on January 27, 2022; executed despite having intellectual disabilities.
- Daniel Lee Siebert – Alabama Institutional Serial #00Z475 – Died from cancer while in custody in 2008, he was known for challenging protocol.
- Thomas Warren Whisenhant – Serial killer who was convicted of murder in 1977 – Executed on May 27, 2010; at the time of his execution he was Alabama's longest serving death row inmate.
- Nathaniel Woods – Convicted of murder in 2005 – Executed on March 5, 2020; controversial execution due to widespread skepticism about the legitimacy of his guilty verdict.
- Robert Bryant Melson – Convicted for the murders of three fast food employees during a robbery in 1994. Executed on June 8, 2017.
- Kenneth Eugene Smith – Convicted of murder. The first person to be executed by nitrogen gas in the United States. Executed on January 25, 2024.
- Jamie Ray Mills – Found guilty of murdering an elderly couple in 2004 and executed on May 30, 2024.
- Keith Edmund Gavin – Found guilty of murdering an elderly contract courier in 1998 and executed on July 18, 2024. Previously convicted and sentenced to 34 years' jail in Illinois for a 1982 murder case.
- Alan Eugene Miller – Convicted of murdering three people. Second person to be executed with nitrogen gas in the United States. Executed on September 26, 2024.
- Carey Dale Grayson — Convicted of murdering a hitchhiker. The third person executed by nitrogen gas on November 21, 2024. His three accomplices (all of whom were juveniles) were all sentenced to life imprisonment.
- John Joseph DeBlase – Convicted of the 2010 murders of his two children. Sentenced to death and sent to death row in 2014.
- Thomas Dale Ferguson and Michael Craig Maxwell – found guilty of the 1997 double murder of Harold and Joey Pugh at Cane Creek and sentenced to death in 1998.
- Demetrius Terrence Frazier – Found guilty of a 1991 rape-murder case and sentenced to death, and later executed by nitrogen hypoxia on February 6, 2025. Previously, Frazier served 18 years of a life sentence in a Michigan prison for another murder in Detroit before being transferred to Alabama's death row in 2011.
- Jack Trawick – convicted serial killer who was executed on June 11, 2009, for the 1992 abduction-killing of college student Stephanie Gach.
- Ryan Clark Petersen, who was sentenced to death for the 2012 Wicksburg nightclub shooting, which led to the deaths of three people and a fourth person wounded.
- Nicholas Bernard Acklin and Joey Wilson, two of the three killers in the 1996 Cell phone murders.
- Jimmy O'Neal Spencer, who committed three murders in 2018 while out on parole from two life sentences for burglary and escape
- Jeffery Lee, who was found guilty of murdering Elaine Thompson and Jimmy Ellis during a 1998 pawn shop robbery. He was executed by lethal injection on September 17, 2026.
- Jeremy Tremaine Williams, who was found guilty of the 2021 rape and murder of Kamarie Holland. Executed on August 13, 2026.
- Anthony Todd Boyd and Robert Shawn Ingram, two of the four perpetrators found guilty of the 1993 kidnapping and murder of Gregory Huguley. Boyd was executed on October 23, 2025, while Ingram remains on death row as of 2026.

Non-death row:

- Bobby Frank Cherry – One of the Klan perpetrators of the 16th Street Baptist Church bombing in Birmingham, which killed four African-American girls. He was convicted of the murders in 2002. On October 13, 2004, Cherry was transferred from Holman Prison to Atmore Community Hospital in Atmore. Cherry died while in hospital custody on November 18, 2004.
- Bobby Ray Gilbert AKA "Snake" – Featured in three parts of MSNBC's documentary Lockup, (2006), filmed inside Holman prison.
- Toforest Johnson – Convicted of the murder of a police officer in 1995. Sentenced to death and sent to death row in 1998. Sentence commuted to life imprisonment without the possibility of parole on October 20, 2026.
- James Emery Paster – Was serving three life sentences at the prison for various robbery offenses in 1982. He was later extradited to Texas to stand trial for murder and was executed there in 1989.

== See also ==
- Capital punishment in Alabama
