= Whisenhunt =

Whisenhunt is a surname. Notable people with the surname include:

- Carson Whisenhunt (born 2000), American baseball player
- Ken Whisenhunt (born 1962), American football coach

== See also ==
- Thomas Whisenhant (1947–2010), American serial killer
