= Murder of Lauren Burk =

2008 murder in Alabama, US

- Undated photo of victim Lauren Burk
- Location: Auburn, Alabama, U.S.
- Date: March 4, 2008; 18 years ago
- Attack type: Murder, shooting, kidnapping, robbery
- Victims: Lauren Ashley Burk, aged 18
- Perpetrator: Courtney Lockhart
- Motive: Robbery
- Charges: Capital murder; Attempted rape; Kidnapping; Robbery
- Verdict: Not guilty of attempted rape; Guilty on remaining charges
- Sentence: Death

The murder of Lauren Burk occurred on March 4, 2008, in Auburn, Alabama. Burk, an 18-year-old freshman at Auburn University, was kidnapped at gunpoint by Courtney Lockhart. Lockhart, a U.S. military veteran who had been dishonorably discharged, robbed Burk and forced her to strip naked. He drove her around for about 30 minutes while he lamented about his unemployment and misfortunes. When Burk attempted to escape, Lockhart shot her in the lungs. Burk, severely injured and naked except for a pair of socks, was left on Alabama State Route 147. She was pronounced dead at a local hospital.

The murder of Burk, which attracted national attention, was part of a violent crime spree during which Lockhart robbed and assaulted several women. The spree began in February 2008 and ended with his arrest on March 7. Judge Jacob Walker cited Lockhart's criminal history when he overrode the jury's unanimous recommendation for life in prison and sentenced him to death. Lockhart is currently on death row at the Holman Correctional Facility.

Burk's parents filed a claim against Auburn University arguing that the decision to merge the university's police force with the city of Auburn's police force led to inadequate security. Alabama's Board of Adjustment denied the claim in November 2014.

== Lauren Burk ==
Lauren Ashley Burk was born on August 11, 1989, in Marietta, Georgia to James Burk and Viviane Guerchon. She graduated from Walton High school and went on to attend Auburn University, where she was an active member of the Delta Gamma sorority and played lacrosse. At Auburn, Burk studied graphic design and art. She aspired to have a career in photography and marketing. Lauren Burk's body was cremated and brought back to her home in Marietta Cobb County, Georgia.

== Courtney Lockhart ==
Courtney Lockhart

Courtney Larrell Lockhart (born October 20, 1984) is a death row inmate at the Holman Correctional Facility in Escambia County, Alabama. In 2003, he joined the U.S. Military and in 2004 he was deployed to South Korea and Iraq. Lockhart was imprisoned for smoking marijuana and assaulting and threatening other soldiers in 2006. He also went absent without leave and assaulted an officer. He spent seven months in confinement and was dishonorably discharged in December 2006. According to a defense psychologist, Lockhart was not diagnosed with post-traumatic stress disorder, but he did have some PTSD symptoms due to his exposure to combat. The psychologist also testified that Lockhart had an IQ of 86 and was immature and had poor judgment.

Burk's murder was part of Lockhart's violent crime spree. Beginning in February 2008, Lockhart committed a string of armed robberies and carjackings in Alabama and Georgia. Lockhart's crimes involved the same methods except for one convenience store robbery. He would choose a female victim and approach her from behind as she entered her vehicle in a parking lot. He would then threaten her with a pistol, demanded her purse, and/or attempt to drive away in her vehicle. Crimes committed by Lockhart include:

- He robbed a convenience store and shot at the store clerk.
- On March 5, he robbed a woman in the parking lot of a LaGrange, Georgia nursing home.
- On March 6, he robbed a 27-year-old woman in a Sam's Club parking lot in Columbus, Georgia. He compelled a woman to give him her purse by pointing a gun at her three-year-old son's head.
- On March 7, he attacked a 72-year-old woman in a Walmart parking lot in Newnan, Georgia. He hit her on the back of her head, held a gun to her head, and shoved her onto the floorboard of the car. He began to back out of the parking space but realized that a witness was following him. He then returned to his vehicle and fled.

== Murder ==
On the evening of March 4, 2008, Burk left her boyfriend's dorm and headed to the Ralph B. Draughon Library, where she planned to study with a friend. Meanwhile, Lockhart was on Auburn University's campus looking for people to rob. He later told investigators that he had spent much of the day on the campus, leaving when he saw a patrol car and then returning.

At around 8:00 pm, Lockhart saw Burk as she was walking to her black 2001 Honda Civic. He confronted her, pointed a Rohm RG revolver at her, and ordered her into her car. Burk backed into her vehicle and crawled into the front passenger's seat. Lockhart got into the driver's seat. Burk handed him $200 in cash and pleaded for him to leave.

Lockhart abducted Burk, driving with one hand on the steering wheel and the other pointing the gun at her. As they left campus, Lockhart ordered Burk to take off her clothing. Burk, initially hesitant, complied with Lockhart's demand and undressed. Lockhart later claimed that he made her undress so she wouldn't "do anything or make any crazy moves." He also said that he "never thought about having sex with her." Lockhart was later charged with attempting to rape Burk, but he was acquitted of the charge at trial.

Lockhart drove Burk around for approximately 30 minutes, passing bars, stores, and downtown restaurants. He complained to Burk about his misfortunes and unemployment. According to Lockhart's confession, Burk attempted to talk him out of the crime and repeatedly asked if he would shoot her. As they left the center of town, Burk tried to reason with her captor, offering to help find him a job. "We were talking about how my life was over and how she could help me get a job," Lockhart told investigators. "She says she knows someone who can get me a job. I said I got a job; I don't need a job." As Lockhart drove Burk along Alabama Highway 147, Burk's friend and boyfriend called to check on her. Lockhart allowed her to answer the phone but demanded that she make up a story to cover up his crime. Burk was forced to claim that she had forgotten about the planned study session. She canceled the session and abruptly hung up. Her friend later said about the call, "At the time, I didn't think about it that much. Looking back at the phone call — wow — I could have realized that something was up."

As Lockhart became frustrated, Burk attempted to escape by opening the passenger door and leaping from the moving vehicle. As she escaped, Lockhart shot her. Lockhart claims that the shot was fired unintentionally, while prosecutors argue that he intentionally killed Burk. Later, in 2010, jurors would find Lockhart guilty of intentionally murdering Burk. Burk was shot at close range, with the muzzle of the gun inches away from her back. The .38 caliber bullet entered the back of her left shoulder, pierced both of her lungs, and exited through her upper right arm. In addition to being shot, Burk was injured by the fall from the vehicle.

Witnesses reported hearing two shots and the nude Burk jumping out of the vehicle. Lockhart fled, leaving Burk lying on Alabama 147 between Lee Road 72 and U.S. 280. Burk, naked except for a pair of socks, crying, and covered in road rash and abrasions, stumbled to her feet and waved down help. As witnesses returned to help Burk, they saw Lockhart idling in the stolen vehicle before driving away. Burk, lying on her back in the middle of the road, was reportedly "taking deep, slow breath" and "gasping." Someone called 9-1-1 at around 9:00 pm. First responders attempted to save Burk and transported her to East Alabama Medical Center. She arrived at the hospital at around 9:35 pm. She was later pronounced dead. According to doctors that treated her, she bled to death from the gunshot wound.

After leaving Burk on the road, Lockhart stopped at a Chevron gas station on North College Street. At 9:17 pm, he used her stolen credit card to purchase gasoline for $14.65. He used the gas to douse the inside of Burk's car and then drove to the Hinton Field parking lot. He attempted to set the car on fire to destroy evidence but was unsuccessful. He then left to get a Burger King bag to use as a fire starter. Lockhart took $46, Burk's iPod, credit card, and his gun. He left Burk's clothing, the rest of her cash, and her digital camera in the car. He set the car on fire and left the campus in his vehicle. He later returned to check on Burk's car. Satisfied with the fire, Lockhart fled north on Interstate 85 to Atlanta, Georgia, where he used Burk's credit card to buy more gas. He used the card again at a Kroger in LaGrange, Georgia before throwing it out the window. Lockhart then returned to Alabama.

== Criminal proceedings ==
=== Investigation and arrest ===
At around 9:30 pm on March 4, police responded to a call about a car on fire on Auburn's campus. The fire was extinguished, and investigators recovered a .38 caliber bullet under the driver's seat. Police ran the car's registration, finding it was owned by Burk's father, James. After receiving a call from the police, Mr. Burk began calling his daughter's friends to locate her. He then drove to Auburn, where he identified Burk's body.

On March 7, Lockhart was pulled over by Phoenix City police officer Dale Richards after speeding through a construction zone on Alabama Highway 80. After calling in Lockhart's information, Officer Richards learned that investigators wanted to speak with him. Richards asked Lockhart to exit the vehicle, but Lockhart resisted. He struggled with Richards and then drove away on Summerville Road, starting a police chase. The chase, involving four police officers, reached 80 miles per hour. Officers later said Lockhart was “reckless” and went off the road several times. During the chase, Lockhart threw his pistol out the window. About half a mile from Glenwood School, Lockhart abruptly stopped the vehicle and opened his door. Officer Richards’ (a motorcycle officer) bike struck the door, causing the officer to fly over the handlebars and onto the road. Lockhart ran into the woods, and officers caught up with him. After several commands to get on the ground, he complied. After handcuffing Lockhart, officers took Burk's iPod and cell phone. Later, when searching his car, officers found .38 shell casings and a t-shirt with blood spots. After his arrest, Lockhart confessed to murdering Burk and to committing several other crimes.

=== Indictment and trial ===
Lockhart was indicted for murder during the commission of a robbery, murder during the commission of a kidnapping, and murder during the commission of an attempted rape. He pleaded not guilty by reason of insanity. Before the trial, Lockhart's defense attorneys filed a motion to have the trial moved from Lee County, due to the amount of media attention the case had garnered but Judge Jacob Walker denied it.

The trial began on November 8, 2010. Prosecutors argued that Lockhart kidnapped and attempted to rape Burk and then intentionally shot her. Prosecutors also tried to present evidence about Lockhart's dishonorable discharge from the military and evidence of his other crimes, but Judge Walker did not allow them to. Lockhart's defense attorneys argued that their client had mental illness due to his military service and that the shooting of Burk was accidental.

After six and a half hours of deliberation over two days, the jury found Lockhart guilty of robbery, kidnapping, and capital murder. They did not find that Lockhart attempted to rape Burk or that the murder was especially heinous and cruel.

The jury recommended that Lockhart be sentenced to life in prison, but Judge Walker overturned it. On March 2, 2011, Lockhart was sentenced to death by a lethal injection. Walker cited Lockhart's criminal history for imposing the death penalty on him. The jury had been unaware of Lockhart's crime spree and negative conduct while in the military. Walker concluded that “had the jury been aware of the additional facts known to the Court, their sentencing recommendation would likely have differed.” Walker also argued that Lockhart's kidnapping of Burk weighed in favor of a death sentence. “[The victim] was alone, unarmed, and she was chosen by Lockhart at random. The kidnapping is even more egregious because she was taken from a college campus, a place where students should feel safe, and forced into her own car. Lockhart forced her to undress and held her at gunpoint to prevent her escape.”

=== Post-conviction ===
After his conviction and death sentence, Lockhart appealed to the Alabama Court of Criminal Appeals. The Court upheld his conviction and death sentence in August 2013. In a 196-page opinion, the Court stated: “The record reflects that Lockhart's sentence was not imposed under the influence of passion, prejudice, or any other arbitrary factor. We determine that Lockhart's sentence is neither disproportionate nor excessive to the penalty imposed in similar cases.” In April 2014, Alabama's Court of Criminal Appeals denied Lockhart's petition for a rehearing. Lockhart then appealed to the Supreme Court of Alabama. The Court denied his petition in September 2014. In January 2015 Lockhart appealed to the Supreme Court of the United States. The Supreme Court denied his petition in April.

In September 2015, Lockhart filed a Rule 32 petition challenging his conviction and death sentence. He subsequently filed an amended petition in May 2016. In October 2017, he added allegations to several claims made in the amended petition. Hearings regarding the petition were held in December 2018 and February 2019. Lockhart's defense attorneys, who represented him through the Equal Justice Initiative, argued that the attorneys who represented him at trial mishandled the case and failed to present evidence about his trauma and how it influenced the shooting. Defense attorneys also want an expert to retest the gun used to shoot Burk, claiming that Lockhart's previous attorneys failed to adequately discover and present evidence showing that it may have accidentally discharged. Prosecutors from the Alabama Attorney General's Capital Litigation Division argued that there was nothing that should cause doubt regarding tests conducted by the state's experts. On April 3, 2020, Judge Walker denied Lockhart's request for relief from his conviction and death sentence. Lockhart appealed the denial of his petition for postconviction relief filed pursuant to Rule 32. In April 2021, the Alabama Court of Criminal Appeals let stand his capital murder conviction and death sentence. As of September 2022 Lockhart remains in the Holman Correctional Facility on death row.

== Aftermath ==
After Burk's murder, her family filed a claim against Auburn University, pressing them to re-establish a campus police force. The Burks claimed that the university's decision to merge its police force with the city's police force led to inadequate security. They sought $1 million. Alabama's Board of Adjustment denied the claim in November 2014. Auburn University has established a scholarship for freshman majoring in graphic design in Burk's honor.

Burk's parents have been strong supporters of Lockhart's death sentence. Burk's mother said at a hearing in 2018, "He didn't give her a second chance. He shouldn't get a second chance either." Her father said at another hearing in 2019, “We maintain our desire for the death penalty. Lauren did get the death penalty without a hearing, and we will do anything it takes to continue this process. Even if it goes to the Supreme Court, the Burk family will never give up.”

== See also ==
- List of death row inmates in the United States
