= Jimmy O'Neal Spencer =

American murderer (born 1966)

- Spencer's Mugshot
- Born: Jimmy O'Neal Spencer; 1965 (age 60–61); Alabama, U.S.
- Status: Incarcerated
- Motive: Robbery (Reliford and Martin); Leaving no witnesses to Martin's murder (Lee)
- Convictions: Burglary (x3); Escape (x3); Assault; Unlawfully breaking into a vehicle Capital murder (x2)
- Penalty: 1989; Life imprisonment; 1993; Life imprisonment; 2022; Death

Details
- Victims: Martha Reliford; Marie Martin; Colton Lee
- Date: 1980s – 1993 (various crimes); July 12, 2018 (triple murder)
- Location: Alabama
- Killed: 3
- Date apprehended: July 15, 2018
- Imprisoned at: Holman Correctional Facility (current)

Jimmy O'Neal Spencer (born 1965) is an American mass murderer who murdered three people during a robbery spree on July 12, 2018. Spencer was originally serving life imprisonment for multiple crimes in Alabama since the 1980s, before he was paroled and released in late 2017. However, months after his release, Spencer murdered 65-year-old Martha Dell Reliford, 74-year-old Marie Kitchens Martin, and Martin's seven-year-old great-grandson, Colton Ryan Lee in Guntersville, Alabama while robbing them. Four years after the triple murder, Spencer was found guilty of capital murder and sentenced to death in 2022. He is currently on death row awaiting his execution.

== Background ==
=== Prior criminal history and release ===
More than three decades before the triple murder, Spencer had already amassed eight criminal convictions dating back to 1984, when he was 19. His offences included three burglaries, three escapes, one assault, and one count of unlawfully breaking into a vehicle. In 1989, Spencer was first sentenced to life imprisonment for burglary, after the court classified him as a habitual offender for his repeat felony convictions. Despite the harsh penalty, Spencer was undeterred and four years later, he escaped from prison in 1993 and committed more crimes while on the run. Spencer was ultimately arrested a second time, and therefore received another life sentence for these second string of offences. He was incarcerated until November 2, 2017, when the Alabama Board of Pardons and Paroles granted him parole and released him.

After his release, Spencer was relocated to a homeless shelter in Birmingham, where he should stay for six months as one of the terms of his release. However, Spencer complied with the order for only three weeks before he left the shelter. From then on, Spencer committed more crimes while on parole, including traffic offences, illegal possession of a firearm, possession of drug paraphernalia, resisting arrest and evading police, and in spite of these repeated run-ins with the law, Spencer's parole was not rescinded. At one point, Spencer and his girlfriend lived in a trailer with two other people, but they became homeless by July 2018.

== Triple murder ==
On July 12, 2018, in Guntersville, Alabama, Spencer, who was armed with a hatchet, first entered the house of one of the victims, 65-year-old Martha Dell Reliford, and robbed the elderly woman of $700. According to Spencer, he had previously went to the house of Reliford to help her run errands and do some work for her. He’s was able to get familiar enough with Reliford to know that she had some money sufficient to pay her rent as of the time he robbed her, and hence targeted her for money. After robbing Reliford, Spencer bludgeoned Reliford in the head thrice with the hatchet and killed her before he left the house. As for the money he stole from Reliford, Spencer spent $100 for methamphetamine, while the rest were spent on cigarettes, beer, food, and rent for a hotel room.

After running out of money, Spencer embarked on a second robbery attempt, which led to the murders of 74-year-old Marie Kitchens Martin and her seven-year-old great-grandson Colton Ryan Lee, who both lived in Guntersville just like Reliford. Based on his confession to the police, Spencer took some mail from the mailbox outside Martin's house, and knocked on the door in order to gain entry into Martin's residence. When Martin opened the door, Spencer sprayed her eyes with a deodorant spray and he forcibly held her at gunpoint with a toy gun. After rounding up both Lee and Martin, Spencer demanded Martin to hand over her purse, which contained only $13. Spencer also stole Martin's credit cards and ransacked the house to search for more valuables.

Afterwards, Spencer proceeded to tie a cord around Martin's neck to choke her, and used a knife to stab Martin in the neck and also slit her throat to ensure she died from her wounds. After murdering Martin, Spencer decided to kill Lee in order to eliminate him as a witness to his great-grandmother's murder. Spencer used a claw hammer to batter Lee twice, but Lee remained standing even after the first two blows. Subsequently, Spencer hit the boy another five or six more times with the claw end of the hammer, and Lee died as a result of the attack.

== Arrest and pre-trial process ==
On July 17, 2018, Jimmy Spencer, who was arrested two days after the murders, was charged with four counts of capital murder, with the first three counts pertaining to each of the three victims while a fourth count for the capital murder of multiple people in a single crime.

On August 6, 2018, Spencer was formally indicted by a grand jury for a total of seven counts of capital murder: three counts of capital murder while serving a life sentence, two counts of capital murder in the course of robbery, one count of capital murder of a child aged below 14, and one count of capital murder of two or more victims in a single event.

In September 2018, the Marshall County District Attorney’s Office announced that they would seek the death penalty against Spencer. The offence of capital murder carries either the death penalty or life imprisonment without parole as a potential punishment under Alabama state law.

On June 8, 2021, Spencer was ruled mentally competent to stand trial for the triple murder.

A day later, on June 9, 2021, while he was transferred from Kilby Correctional Facility to Marshall County Jail, Spencer was discovered to have a concealed shank when going through a body scanner. As a result, Spencer was held in solitary confinement in the Marshall County Jail, where he would be detained while pending trial for the murders.

On August 8, 2022, Spencer was set to have a parole hearing as part of his previous life sentences despite the charges of capital murder he faced for the triple homicide. Alabama Governor Kay Ivey submitted an open letter to the parole board, strongly urging the board to not grant parole for Spencer, and added that Spencer had murdered three innocent people in cold blood after he was wrongfully released, and it would be "dangerous and downright despicable" to release him under these reprehensible circumstances. A day later, the state parole committee denied parole for Spencer, and Alabama Attorney General Steve Marshall, who personally represented the state in the hearing, expressed that he was pleased with the outcome, declaring that Spencer should not be set free in view of his double life sentence and upcoming trial for murdering three victims.

== Capital murder trial ==
In late October 2022, Jimmy Spencer stood trial for the triple murder of Colton Lee, Marie Martin and Martha Reliford.

On October 26, 2022, Spencer was found guilty of capital murder for the killings of Reliford, Martin and Lee.

On October 29, 2022, the jury unanimously recommended the death penalty for the murders of all three victims.

On November 14, 2022, Marshall County Circuit Judge Tim Riley formally sentenced Spencer to death for the triple murder, and during sentencing, Judge Riley remarked that the heinous nature of Spencer's murderous actions made him "a reason for the death penalty to exist".

== Appeals ==
In January 2023, Jimmy Spencer's petition for a new trial was denied by Marshall County Circuit Judge Tim Riley.

In February 2023, Spencer filed an appeal against his murder conviction and death sentence to the Alabama Court of Criminal Appeals.

On December 20, 2024, the Alabama Court of Criminal Appeals denied Spencer's appeal.

In March 2025, the Alabama Court of Criminal Appeals dismissed Spencer's petition for a rehearing of his direct appeal.

On September 19, 2025, Spencer's appeal was rejected by the Alabama Supreme Court.

== Aftermath ==
When the triple murder and Jimmy Spencer's criminal history first came to light, Janette Grantham, the director of crime victims' rights group VOCAL (Victims of Crime and Leniency), expressed the outrage felt by the group with regards to Spencer's parole in spite of the high risk of re-offending and the danger he posed to the public, and questioned the parole board's decision and handling of Spencer's case.

In May 2019, the state of Alabama agreed to pay a compensation sum of $1 million (excluding the attorney's fees) to the families of Martha Reliford, Marie Martin and Colton Lee. Earlier, the families of the victims alleged that the state had wrongfully granted parole to Spencer and failed to supervise him, and hence it led to the murders in return. The state eventually conceded and before any lawsuits were filed, they agreed to compensate the victims' families with $1 million, which was the maximum amount under the law. According to Birmingham attorney Tommy James, the families agreed to the sum after negotiations with the state.

=== Influence over Alabama's parole system ===
In the aftermath of the murders, the Jimmy Spencer case was widely seen as having effectively ended — or at least significantly diminished — the chances of parole for prisoners awaiting release in Alabama, and also influenced the changes to the parole regulations and policies in Alabama.

In October 2018, three months after the triple murder, it was reported that more than 180 prisoners, many of whom were serving life sentences, were paroled and released a month before in September 2018. In light of this information, Montgomery District Attorney Daryl Bailey, as well as VOCAL, called for changes to the Alabama Board of Parole and Pardons, out of concern that violent offenders may potentially be released early only to commit further crimes and endanger society at large.

Alabama Governor Kay Ivey announced a 75-day moratorium on all pending parole hearings in October 2018, and directed the state parole board to submit a corrective plan to rectify any flaws to the parole system, in order to prevent similar cases of re-offending in the future. The board eventually came up with a corrective plan and submitted it in November 2018. A bill to overhaul the parole board was passed by the Senate in May 2019, and the governor eventually signed it into law.

After significant changes were made to the Alabama Board of Pardons and Paroles due to the Spencer case, the rate of parole approvals fell drastically over the next several years after the murders. By May 2019, the parole approval rate fell by half. Over a three-year period, the approval rate fell by 67% between 2019 and 2022 in Alabama, first falling from 31% in 2019 to 20% in 2020, and then to 15% in 2021. In 2022, only 10% of the prisoners reviewed for parole had their applications granted, and in the following year of 2023, it fell to around 8%. It was also noted that of all the parole approvals, the rate of release of African-American prisoners noticeably lagged behind that of the White prisoners, raising concerns about the racial disparity in granting or refusing parole for prisoners of different races or ethnicities.

In April 2023, the Alabama House Judiciary Committee approved a bill that bars an incarcerated convict from being reviewed for parole if they are facing new local, state or federal charges that warranted a prison sentence of at least six months. The bill was partly made due to Spencer's convictions of escape and assault, which he committed while serving his first life sentence.

== See also ==
- Capital punishment in Alabama
- List of death row inmates in the United States § Alabama
