= Westley Devon Harris =

American mass murderer (born 1980)

- Born: April 3, 1980 (age 46); Alabama, U.S.
- Status: Incarcerated on death row in Alabama
- Conviction: Capital murder (6 counts)
- Penalty: Death

Details
- Victims: 6
- Date: August 26, 2002
- Country: United States
- Location: Rutledge, Alabama
- Weapons: 12-gauge shotgun; 20-gauge shotgun
- Imprisoned at: Holman Correctional Facility

Westley Devon Harris (Note: Also spelt Westley Devone Harris) (born April 3, 1980) is an American convicted mass murderer sentenced to death in Alabama for the murders of six people in 2002, which are known as the Ball family murders. Harris committed the killings in a local farm in Rutledge, Alabama on August 26, 2002, when he fatally shot six family members of his 16-year-old pregnant girlfriend, reportedly out of anger towards them for their attempts to separate him from his girlfriend and the couple's toddler daughter. After committing the murders, Harris abducted his girlfriend and went on the run for three days, before he was arrested and charged with six counts of capital murder. The Ball family murders were the deadliest mass murder in Alabama's history until it was superseded by the Geneva County massacre in 2009.

Harris's case initially ended with a mistrial in 2004, before he was convicted in a second trial in 2005. Originally, the jury recommended Harris to be sentenced to life without parole by a 7–5 vote, the trial judge overrode the jury's recommendation and sentenced Harris to death for the murders, and Harris is currently on death row awaiting execution at the Holman Correctional Facility.

== Ball family murders ==
On August 26, 2002, 22-year-old Westley Devon Harris committed the murders of six people, who were the family members of his girlfriend.

=== Background ===
Prior to the killings, Harris was in a two-year relationship with Janice Ball, who was 16 at the time of the homicides. Together, the couple had one daughter, and Harris's girlfriend was pregnant with their second child as of August 2002. Reportedly, Janice left Harris and went to live with her grandmother Mila Ruth Ball in the Ball family's farm in Rutledge, Crenshaw County, Alabama, due to Harris becoming "violent" towards her. Later, Janice's father, Willie Hasley, (Note: Also known as Willie Haslip) bought a trailer and placed it in the farm, as he wanted Harris to at least come to take care of Janice and their baby and to start a family. The couple and their daughter would live at the trailer on and off, due to Harris's abusive nature towards Janice.

Eventually, on August 23, 2002, three days before the murders, after Harris refused to give Janice money to buy diapers and slapped her, Janice told Harris to pack his belongings and drove him away. Throughout the next two days, Harris continually called Janice and probed her if her family wanted to file charges against him, although Janice did not respond to his questions. Harris returned to the farm to look for Janice, but Mila and Hasley, as well as Jerry Ball (the eldest of Janice's three brothers), told him to leave, with Hasley and Jerry using shotguns to drive Harris away. Reportedly, Harris was enraged by this, and it would lead to him killing the family of his girlfriend the next day.

=== Murders ===
On the morning of August 26, 2002, at 8:30am, Harris armed himself with a shotgun and barged into the farm. At that time, Janice and Mila were present in home sleeping in the latter's bedroom, and both of them were held at gunpoint by Harris, who tied them up with tape, and Harris fatally shot 62-year-old Mila Ruth Ball in the kitchen.

Harris later took Janice to the bedroom and tied her to a bed. Afterwards, Harris entered the bedroom of 17-year-old Tony Ball, Janice's second brother, and shot the sleeping boy in the head, thus killing him. Harris remained in the house with Janice and their 17-month-old daughter, watching television until 3:30pm, when Jerry returned home with Janice's youngest brother, 14-year-old John Ball, having fetched the boy from school. John alone returned to the house while Jerry drove away, and John was subsequently shot and killed in the kitchen.

About 4:00pm, Hasley returned home in his pick-up truck, and Janice was threatened by Harris to stay silent and not seek help. Harris took a shotgun and pistol with him and exited the house, shooting and killing 40-year-old Willie Hasley in the hog pen. More than an hour after the murder of Hasley, JoAnn Ball, Janice's 35-year-old mother, returned home and saw both Harris and Janice together. JoAnn was shot by Harris once in the back of her neck, and she was killed after Harris delivered a second shot from behind. The bodies of JoAnn and Tony were later disposed of inside the trailer.

Jerry was the sixth and last member of the Ball family to be killed. He drove back home and arrived at the house just as Harris was packing up some of the family's belongings into JoAnn's car. According to Janice, who witnessed the shooting from behind the trailer (Harris brought her there after killing her mother), she saw Jerry running up the porch towards the door and calling her name, before Harris gunned down the 19-year-old by shooting him once in the head and another in the chest, and Jerry's body was later stuffed inside a car trunk. Afterwards, Harris fled the farm with Janice and their daughter.

== Arrest and charges ==
The bodies of the six victims were found a day after the mass murder. Westley Harris and Janice Ball were both considered as suspects behind the mass murder, and were placed on the police's wanted list.

Three days after the killings, Harris and Ball were located, and the former was arrested for killing the victims, while the latter was considered a witness and released from custody. On August 30, 2002, Harris was charged with six counts of capital murder, and under Alabama state law, capital murder carries either life imprisonment or the death penalty. District Attorney John Andrews announced that he would seek the death penalty for Harris.

A week after the murders, a funeral was held for all the six victims, and more than 800 people attended the wake. Janice, who was the sole surviving member of her family, was held in a guarded location.

A trial date was initially set in June 2003 for the Ball family murders, before it was postponed to August 18, 2003. Subsequently, the trial was again delayed to the fall itself due to the forensic experts conducting more tests on the evidence.

== Trial proceedings ==
=== First trial ===
On October 25, 2004, Westley Harris officially stood trial for the Ball family murder case. Jury selection commenced that day, and the first day of trial was set to begin on November 3, 2004, after a jury was chosen for the case.

During the trial, the prosecution contended that the killings were all done out of anger, mainly centering around Harris being driven out and told to stay away from his girlfriend. Janice Ball, who came as a witness, testified that she was fearful that Harris would kill her or hurt their baby, given that she witnessed how he murdered her entire family. In response however, the defence argued that Janice was an unreliable witness and their main contention was that she had a motive for wanting her family dead because she was allegedly sexually abused by her father and brothers, and she solicited Harris to commit the murders.

On November 15, 2004, a mistrial was declared in Harris's case after a woman was allegedly caught with trying to influence at least one juror of the case, which amounted to jury tampering, and a re-trial was ordered to be set for Harris.

=== Re-trial ===
On May 28, 2005, the re-trial of Harris began with jury selection. Two days later, a jury was chosen for Harris's re-trial.

On June 14, 2005, the jury rejected Harris's defence and found him guilty of all six counts of capital murder.

A day after his conviction, on June 15, 2005, by a majority vote of 7–5, the jury recommended Harris to be sentenced to life without parole for the Ball family murders. However, the recommendation was non-binding, and the trial judge still had the right to override the jury's recommendation and impose the death penalty. Rod Campbell, the jury foreman, stated that voting for life or death was among the hardest decisions he made as a juror, and he stated he would have mixed feelings if the judge rejected their vote in favour of a death sentence, but he stated he had no doubt Harris was guilty of the murders.

Before the judge officially sentenced Harris, Attorney General Troy King sought the death penalty for Harris, urging the judge to reject the jury's ruling and impose the maximum sentence of death, stating that capital punishment was warranted in light of the heinous and brutal nature of the murders. In a statement to the Associated Press, King described the Ball family murders as the "worst mass murder in Alabama in modern times", and the death penalty was warranted to sanction the "wickedness and brutality" of the crime.

On August 12, 2005, Circuit Judge Edward McFerrin formally sentenced 25-year-old Westley Harris to death by lethal injection after overriding the jury's decision. During sentencing, Judge McFerrin stated that it was not an easy decision for him due to his personal beliefs.

In response to the verdict, King described it as a "true promise of justice" for Harris to be given the death penalty for the worst mass murder committed in the state, and stated that Harris deserved to be executed for the "savagery" of killing the family of his girlfriend. Judicial Circuit District Attorney John Andrews similarly applauded the verdict and stated that Harris was the "most guilty man" he knew in his life and hoped for peace for the families involved in the case. The relatives of the victims were all relieved at the ruling. Willie Hasley's brother stated that he would feel at ease the moment Harris received his lethal injection, and the brother of JoAnn Ball stated it was justified to sentence Harris to death for murdering his sister, nephews, mother and brother-in-law.

== Appeal process ==
On December 21, 2007, the Alabama Court of Criminal Appeals dismissed Harris's direct appeal against his death sentence.

On August 14, 2008, Harris's follow-up appeal was denied by the Alabama Supreme Court.

On July 9, 2021, the Alabama Court of Criminal Appeals dismissed Harris's appeal.

On March 11, 2022, the Alabama Supreme Court rejected Harris's appeal for post-conviction relief.

== Aftermath and death row ==
The Ball family murders were one of Alabama's most infamous mass murders to date. As of 2016, when Derrick Dearman was arrested for the 2016 Citronelle homicides (which happened 150 miles away from the 2002 murder scene), statistics showed that 64 people were killed in 12 massacres (with the Ball family murders included) that occurred in Alabama from 1941 to 2016. Dearman was convicted of capital murder, sentenced to death and executed on October 17, 2024.

As of 2021, Harris was one of 167 inmates held on death row in Alabama.

About 12 years after Harris was condemned to death row, in April 2017, the Alabama state lawmakers passed a new bill to abolish the power of judicial override, enabling the jury to have a final say on sentence in capital cases instead of judges, and Governor Kay Ivey signed the bill into law. However, the law was not retroactive and Harris's death sentence remained intact. Later, a subsequent bill was proposed to make the law become retroactive and approve the re-sentencing of condemned killers affected by judicial override, but it was ultimately rejected. A report in May 2024 revealed that Harris was one of 30 condemned prisoners who were still facing death sentences received due to judicial override.

== See also ==
- Judicial override
- Capital punishment in Alabama
- List of death row inmates in the United States § Alabama
- List of rampage killers in the United States
