= Murder of William Clayton Jr. =

1998 shooting and murder of a contract courier in Alabama

William Clayton Jr.
- Born: William Clinton Clayton Jr. December 10, 1929; Birmingham, Jefferson County, Alabama, U.S.
- Died: March 6, 1998 (aged 68); Centre, Cherokee County, Alabama, U.S.
- Cause of death: Gunshot wound
- Resting place: Jefferson Memorial Gardens
- Other name: Bill Clayton
- Occupation: Contract courier
- Known for: Victim of a robbery-murder case
- Spouse: Unnamed wife (m. 1960)
- Children: 7

On March 6, 1998, 68-year-old contract courier William Clinton Clayton Jr. was shot to death by an unknown person while he was taking money out of an ATM in downtown Centre, Alabama. The killer was later identified as Keith Edmund Gavin, a resident of Chicago who was out on parole after serving 16 years of a 34-year jail term for a 1982 murder case in his native state of Illinois. Gavin was convicted of the murder and sentenced to death in 1999, and he was incarcerated on death row for about 25 years before he was executed via lethal injection on July 18, 2024.

== Background ==
=== William Clinton Clayton Jr. ===
William Clinton Clayton Jr. was born in Birmingham, Jefferson County, Alabama on December 10, 1929. Clayton, affectionately known as Bill, grew up in Alabama and he studied up to high school, although he did not complete his high school education. Sometime after he left school, Clayton served in the army at one point and was a Korean War veteran.

Clayton married his wife in 1960 and together, the couple had seven children. According to his son, Clayton was a hard-working and dedicated family man who worked in various jobs, including custodial work, railroad work and various driving jobs, and he was said to be a simple man who had learning disabilities.

At the time of his death in 1998, Clayton worked as a contract courier.

=== Keith Edmund Gavin ===
Keith Edmund Gavin
- Mugshot of Keith Edmund Gavin prior his execution.
- Born: March 30, 1960; Chicago, Illinois, U.S.
- Died: July 18, 2024 (aged 64); Holman Correctional Facility, Alabama, U.S.
- Cause of death: Execution by lethal injection
- Convictions: Illinois; Burglary (1979); Murder (1982); Alabama; Capital murder (1998)
- Penalty: Illinois; Probation (1979); 34 years' imprisonment (1982); Alabama; Death (1998)

Details
- Victims: Reginald Allen, 20 (1981); William Clinton Clayton Jr., 68 (1998)
- Date: Illinois; 1979; 1981; Alabama; March 6, 1998
- Locations: Cook County, Illinois (1979); Cherokee County, Alabama (1998)
- Imprisoned at: Holman Correctional Facility

Keith Edmund Gavin was born in Chicago, Illinois on March 30, 1960. He was the second of 12 children in his family. Gavin grew up in a ghetto-like neighborhood where drug activity and gang violence was rampant. Gavin's father reportedly had a harsh disciplinary style towards Gavin, who later dropped out of school in the 11th grade.

Gavin's criminal history was first dated back in 1979, when he was found guilty of burglary on October 25 of that same year. On March 28, 1981, Gavin, then 21, shot and killed 20-year-old Reginald Allen during an argument in Cook County, Illinois. On June 9, 1982, Gavin was convicted of the murder and sentenced to 34 years in prison. During his incarceration, Gavin completed his GED and also took up some college courses.

In December 1997, after serving more than 16 years behind bars, Gavin was released from prison. However, merely four months later, he would commit another murder.

== Clayton's murder ==
On March 6, 1998, in Centre, Cherokee County, Alabama, 68-year-old William Clayton Jr. was murdered via shooting by Keith Edmund Gavin.

On that day, Clayton was preparing to bring his wife out for dinner, and he drove his workplace van to an ATM at Regions Bank to withdraw some money for the dinner night. At the same time, Gavin, accompanied by his cousin Dewayne Lemark Meeks, who worked in the Illinois Department of Corrections, were driving from Gavin's hometown in Chicago to Alabama to locate a woman whom Gavin met in the past. After the duo reached downtown Centre, they came across Clayton, who was then at the ATM withdrawing money. According to prosecutors, Gavin formed an intention to rob Clayton, and hence, he departed his cousin's car and approached Clayton with his cousin's .40-calibre Glock pistol, opening the door of Clayton's van and fired two shots at Clayton, who was pushed into the passenger's seat by Gavin, who took over the wheel and drove away in Clayton's van. The shooting itself was witnessed by Gavin's cousin, who fled the scene out of fear. Three more eyewitnesses – Larry Twilley, Ronald Baker and Richard Henry Jr. – also testified they saw a gunman, whom they identified as Gavin, opening the side door of Clayton's van and shooting Clayton twice.

Danny Smith, an investigator from the District Attorney's Office of the Ninth Judicial Circuit caught sight of Clayton's van and gave chase. After reaching the middle of an intersection, Gavin stopped the van and fled into the nearby woods, and he also fired twice at the officer (who escaped unscathed) while making his escape, leaving behind Clayton, who was discovered barely alive and sustaining three gunshot wounds in the van. Clayton was rushed to a local hospital, where he was pronounced dead on arrival. An autopsy revealed that one of the two bullets in Clayton's body penetrated the left arm, heart and lungs, and it was stuck at the passenger-side door of the van. The second one entered Clayton's left hip and was stuck on his back.

A manhunt was swiftly carried out to capture Gavin. Police dogs were also dispatched during the search, and one of the dogs was able to find Gavin hiding in a creek, and the police cornered Gavin, who attempted to escape. However, the attempt was futile, and Gavin was arrested and subsequently taken into police custody.

== Gavin's trial and sentencing ==
=== Charges ===
After his arrest, Keith Gavin, who introduced himself as "Keith Edmunds" to the police, was initially charged under his fake alias for the murder of William Clayton Jr., before his real name and previous conviction for murder in 1982 were discovered by the Alabama authorities.

In April 1998, Dewayne Meeks, who was then 33 years old and married with a son, became the second person to be charged with murder after the gun issued to him by the Illinois Department of Corrections was connected to the fatal shooting of Clayton, and the US$50,000 bond granted to Meeks was revoked. Three months after he was first charged, the prosecution decided to drop the murder charge against Meeks in July 1998, leaving Gavin the only person left facing a murder charge.

=== Jury trial and verdict ===
On November 3, 1999, Gavin stood trial before a 12-member jury at the Cherokee County Circuit Court for one count of murder and one count of attempted murder. For the most serious charge of murder, the potential punishment was either the death penalty or life in prison without the possibility of parole.

In midst of the trial, the defense counsel representing Gavin in court sought to push the blame on his cousin Dwayne Meeks, who turned state evidence against Gavin in court, and stated that there was no direct evidence to connect the murder weapon to Gavin, and raised arguments to cast doubts over the incriminating evidence against Gavin.

On November 7, 1999, the jury found Gavin guilty of both counts of murder and attempted murder.

On November 17, 1999, the jury released its decision on sentence, with ten jurors recommending a death sentence for Gavin while the final two jurors settled on a life sentence. Under Alabama law, a judge had the discretion to impose the death penalty if the jury made a unanimous decision or alternatively, a minimum of ten jurors out of 12 agreed to sentence an accused to death. For security reasons, Gavin was transferred to the St. Clair Correctional Facility prior to his official sentencing, which was originally scheduled to occur on December 6, 1999, but the hearing was delayed to January 5, 2000.

On January 5, 2000, for the charge of murdering William Clayton Jr., 39-year-old Keith Edmund Gavin was sentenced to death by Circuit Judge David A. Rains, who agreed with the jury's decision during sentencing. Justice Rains also sentenced Gavin to life imprisonment for the other charge of attempted murder of Danny Smith. The death sentence of Gavin was reportedly the first death sentence meted out by Justice Rains nearly 20 years after he was first appointed as a judge.

== Appeals and death warrant ==
=== Appeal process ===
In June 2000, Keith Gavin petitioned for a new trial in his case, claiming that his original trial counsel was ineffective and there was selective prosecution in his case.

In September 2003, Gavin filed an appeal to the Alabama Court of Criminal Appeals, arguing that he was innocent and falsely implicated in the murder by his cousin Dewayne Meeks, whom he continued to finger as the real killer. He also attempted to argue that he was being unfairly judged due to racial bias since he was African-American and most of the jurors who voted to convict him were white, and he was more likely to be indicted for capital murder in predominantly white Cherokee County as an African-American compared to a white. However, Gavin's appeal was dismissed. A follow-up appeal to the Supreme Court of Alabama was also dismissed on May 28, 2004. The U.S. Supreme Court later rejected the appeal of Gavin in 2005.

In 2020, a federal judge heard Gavin's appeal at the United States District Court for the Northern District of Alabama, and ruled that Gavin had ineffective counsel at his sentencing hearing because his original lawyers failed to present more mitigating evidence of Gavin's violent and abusive childhood in Chicago, which would have warranted a possible sentence of life without parole. Two years later, in July 2022, the ruling was struck down by the 11th Circuit U.S. Court of Appeals after the court found that Gavin's trial counsel were not ineffective in their duties and maintained the death sentence in his case.

=== Death warrant and final appeals ===
On April 18, 2024, the Alabama Supreme Court authorized the death warrant of Gavin after approving the request of the state attorney general. On April 26, 2024, about a week after the approval of his death warrant, Gavin's death sentence was scheduled to be carried out via lethal injection on July 18, 2024. Gavin was the third death row convict in Alabama to receive a death warrant, and just a month prior, a man named Jamie Ray Mills was the second condemned person to have his execution date set for murdering an elderly couple; Mills was executed via lethal injection on May 30, 2024, four months after Kenneth Eugene Smith became the first in Alabama and elsewhere in the world to be executed via nitrogen gas inhalation.

On July 9, 2024, nine days before his scheduled execution, Gavin filed a legal motion to not undergo an autopsy after his death. Gavin, who converted to Islam while on death row, stated that the teachings preached to him cited that as a Muslim, his human body was sacred and must be kept whole, and an autopsy might desecrate his body and violate the sanctity of having a complete body even after death. Three days later, on July 12, 2024, six days before Gavin was due to be executed, an Alabama court permitted Gavin's request to waive an autopsy in his case.

Although Gavin confirmed that he would not seek a stay of execution during his lawsuit to stave off the post-mortem examination of his body, he filed a last-minute appeal during the final week leading up to his execution. In the appeal itself, Gavin petitioned for a stay of execution and maintained that he was innocent and never killed Clayton, and asked for a review of his case. The Alabama Supreme Court rejected the plea, and finally, hours before Gavin was slated to be executed, the U.S. Supreme Court refused to halt the execution and rejected the petition.

On the eve of Gavin's execution, Clayton's youngest son spoke up in the media about the case. Matthew "Matt" Joseph Clayton, who was 28 when his father died, told the press that Clayton was a "gentle giant" and great father to his children, and Matt said the family could not believe he would meet such a violent end and were shocked when the murder occurred. Matt revealed that his mother was still healthy at the age of 94 and he felt lucky to have his mother around for most of his life since his father left at a younger age, and while he noted that Gavin was not remorseful for the murder of his father, the family had long forgiven him for the tragedy, partly on account of Gavin's tragic childhood and upbringing. Matt expressed his intention to attend the execution of Gavin, mainly to represent his family and to acknowledge the efforts of the state officials in bringing his father's killer to justice.

== Execution ==
On July 18, 2024, 26 years after he murdered William Clayton Jr., 64-year-old Keith Edmund Gavin was officially put to death via lethal injection at Holman Correctional Facility. Before the drugs were administered to him at 6:16pm, Gavin said his last words, "I love my family.", and he also made some Muslim prayers prior to closing his eyes at 6:20pm, and he was pronounced dead at 6:32pm. Witnesses of the execution noted there were no major problems with the execution procedure.

Matt Clayton, the victim's youngest son who witnessed the execution, told the press that his father was a good man who was dearly missed by his wife and children and he "did not deserve to die this way". He also questioned why Gavin was released on parole despite his 1982 murder conviction in Illinois. Alabama state governor Kay Ivey released a media statement and stated that justice was served for Clayton's loved ones after the execution of Gavin and she offered her prayers to Clayton's family.

According to the Alabama Department of Corrections, on the eve of his execution, Gavin refused to have breakfast, lunch and dinner but ate a bag of Ruffles cheddar sour cream potato chips, a bag of Lay's plain potato chips and a Hershey chocolate bar with almonds, purchased from vending machines in the prison snack bar. On the date of his execution, Gavin reportedly declined a last meal offer, but requested ice cream and Mountain Dew.

Gavin was the third condemned criminal from Alabama, as well as the tenth convict in the U.S. to be executed during the year of 2024.

== See also ==
- Capital punishment in Alabama
- List of people executed in Alabama
- List of people executed in the United States in 2024

Executions carried out in Alabama
Preceded by Jamie Ray Mills May 30, 2024	Keith Edmund Gavin; July 18, 2024	Succeeded by Alan Eugene Miller September 26, 2024
Executions carried out in the United States
Preceded by Richard Norman Rojem Jr. – Oklahoma June 27, 2024	Keith Edmund Gavin – Alabama; July 18, 2024	Succeeded by Arthur Lee Burton – Texas August 7, 2024
