= Murders of Benjamin and Sarah Bonnie =

2006 double murder of a couple in New Bloomfield, Missouri

Benjamin and Sarah Bonnie
- Sarah and Benjamin Bonnie, pictured on their wedding day in 2005
- Born: Sarah Ann Mosier: March 28, 1981; Benjamin Wade Bonnie: October 29, 1978; Sarah Bonnie; Jefferson City, Missouri, U.S. Benjamin Bonnie; Chariton, Iowa, U.S.
- Died: Sarah Bonnie: December 23, 2006 (aged 25); Benjamin Bonnie: December 23, 2006 (aged 28); New Bloomfield, Missouri, U.S.
- Cause of death: Fatal gunshot wounds
- Resting place: Hawthorn Memorial Gardens
- Education: Jefferson City High School (Sarah); Knoxville High School (Benjamin); Des Moines Area Community College (Benjamin)
- Occupations: Medical technician (Sarah); Auto-mechanic (Benjamin)
- Known for: Victims of a double murder case
- Children: 1

On December 23, 2006, in New Bloomfield, Missouri, 25-year-old Sarah Ann Bonnie (née Mosier; March 28, 1981 – December 23, 2006) and her 28-year-old husband Benjamin Wade Bonnie (alias Ben Bonnie; October 29, 1978 – December 23, 2006) were both shot and murdered by her 34-year-old cousin Brian Joseph Dorsey (March 21, 1972 – April 9, 2024), whom they hid at her house to help him evade the drug dealers who were searching for him to collect their debts. After surrendering himself to the police, Dorsey was found guilty of the double murder and sentenced to death in 2008. After losing his appeals and clemency plea, Dorsey was executed on April 9, 2024, 18 years after the murders.

== Murders ==
On December 23, 2006, a young couple living in a neighbourhood in New Bloomfield, Missouri, were brutally murdered by a relative inside their house.

On that day itself, both Sarah and Benjamin Bonnie, aged 25 and 28 respectively, received a call from Sarah's cousin, 34-year-old Brian Joseph Dorsey, who owed money to drug dealers looking for him and he wanted to borrow money from Sarah. The couple decided to go to Dorsey's apartment to bring Dorsey out with the help of some friends, and Dorsey took refuge at his cousin's house.

At some point during the night, the Bonnies went to bed, and while the couple was sleeping, Dorsey removed a single-shot shotgun from the Bonnies' garage, and entered the bedroom of the Bonnies, where he shot and killed the couple. Dorsey first killed his cousin Sarah by shooting her in the jaw from an approximate distance of 12 inches, before he reloaded the gun and delivered another single shot at Benjamin in the right ear, resulting in Benjamin's death. Dorsey proceeded to sexually assault Sarah's dead body, poured some bleach on Sarah's lower body and stole some valuables from the couple's house. Throughout the murders, Dorsey did not harm the Bonnies' four-year-old daughter Jade.

It was speculated that the Bonnies died during the late night of December 23, 2006 or the early morning hours of December 24, 2006. On the afternoon of December 24, 2006, the family members of the couple noticed that the Bonnies did not turn up for a family gathering, so Sarah's parents went over to the couple's house to check on their daughter and son-in-law, and found their granddaughter alone in the living room watching television. After the girl told her grandparents that she had tried waking her parents up to no avail, Sarah's parents knocked on the bedroom door of the Bonnies, which was locked. After breaking down the door, Sarah's parents discovered the bodies of the couple, which revealed that they had been murdered.

Three days after the shootings, Dorsey surrendered himself to the police and confessed to the murders of Sarah and Benjamin Bonnie, which led to him being arrested and taken into custody for the double murder.

== Trial of Brian Dorsey ==
After his arrest, Brian Dorsey was charged with two counts of first-degree murder for shooting the Bonnies to death. Under Missouri law, an offence of first-degree murder carries the death penalty or life imprisonment without the possibility of parole. Dorsey did not face charges for having sex with Sarah Bonnie's corpse despite the incriminating DNA evidence against him.

On March 10, 2008, Dorsey pled guilty to the double murder charges against him, and was therefore convicted of the killings. His sentencing trial would take place before a jury, and despite his plea of guilt, Dorsey still faced the possibility of a death sentence.

A sentencing hearing was officially convened before a Boone County jury on August 28, 2008, after the jury selection commenced two years earlier. The prosecution had earlier expressed their intention to seek the death penalty for Dorsey, whose lawyers were pushing for life without parole on his behalf.

Testifying before the 12-member jury, Dorsey stated that he did not remember shooting his cousin and her husband with a shotgun because he did it under the heavy influence of drugs. Dorsey told jurors he could recall playing pool and drinking beer with Benjamin and others in the couple's garage, and also testified that he recalled holding a shotgun inside the bedroom of the Bonnies but did not remember if he fired or reloaded the shotgun. Despite DNA evidence that confirmed that Dorsey had sex with Sarah's corpse after murdering her, Dorsey claimed not to recall doing such a thing.

When they were called as witnesses, Dorsey's parents, friends and former coaches described him as a "single child, gentle and non-violent" person who used to play in the football team during his high school days, and Dorsey's parents told the jury that Dorsey, who juggled multiple jobs, suffered from depression for years and survived two suicide attempts in the past. As for Benjamin's father Greg Bonnie, he testified that the death of his son was a huge loss and not only did he lose his son, he also lost a "precious friend" and he described it as a great betrayal and he was unable to forgive Dorsey.

On August 28, 2008, the jury issued their verdict on Dorsey's sentence, unanimously recommending that he be given two death sentences for both counts of murder, one for each victim.

On November 10, 2008, Dorsey was officially sentenced to death by Circuit Judge Gene Hamilton for each count of murder for which he was convicted.

== Appeal processes ==
After he was first condemned to death row, Brian Dorsey appealed against his two death sentences for murdering Benjamin and Sarah Bonnie.

On July 16, 2010, the Missouri Supreme Court rejected Dorsey's appeal against the trial verdict.

On December 3, 2013, Dorsey submitted another appeal to the Missouri Supreme Court to challenge his two death sentences, and he also raised doubts over the DNA evidence that incriminated him for the Bonnie murders and sexual abuse of Sarah Bonnie's corpse, but on November 12, 2014, the Missouri Supreme Court turned down Dorsey's appeal.

On May 19, 2017, Dorsey appealed once again to the Missouri Supreme Court in another bid to overturn his death sentence.

On April 7, 2022, the 8th U.S. Circuit Court of Appeals rejected Dorsey's appeal and claims of ineffective legal counsel during his trial for their alleged failure to investigate and present evidence of his adjustment to incarceration. These grounds of appeal were similarly rejected by Roseann A. Ketchmark, the U.S. District Judge for the Western District of Missouri in an earlier legal proceeding. The final appeal of Dorsey was eventually rejected by the U.S. Supreme Court as well, paving way for Dorsey to be executed on a later date after he had exhausted all avenues of appeal in his case.

== Death warrant and final appeals ==
=== Scheduling of execution date ===
On February 22, 2023, Missouri Attorney General Andrew Bailey announced that he would petition to the Missouri Supreme Court to schedule Brian Dorsey's execution date. By Missouri law, should the state Supreme Court approve a condemned inmate's death warrant, the death sentence would be carried on a date that fell between 90 and 120 days from the Supreme Court's order.

On December 13, 2023, the Missouri Supreme Court approved the death warrant of Dorsey, scheduling his execution date as April 9, 2024.

=== Clemency hearing and outcome ===
After Dorsey's death warrant was released, a high-profile campaign was conducted to plead for clemency in Dorsey's case. Over 70 correction officers and prison staff members gathered together to petition to Mike Parson, the governor of Missouri, for clemency on behalf of Dorsey, asking for his death sentence to be commuted to life in prison without the possibility of parole. Sources reported that during his time on death row, Dorsey was a model inmate and he worked as a prison barber for both prisoners and prison staff alike, and he maintained good behaviour while in prison. Most of the prison officers who signed the petition were generally supportive of the death penalty, but they all agreed that Dorsey was not among the "worst of the worst" offenders who deserved to be executed.

Anti-death penalty activists similarly asked for the governor to spare the life of Dorsey on account of his efforts in rehabilitation and positive behaviour behind bars. A former judge who once upheld the death sentence of Dorsey expressed his regret for having made that decision back then, and he agreed that Dorsey did not deserve to be executed. Five former jurors who were involved in the sentencing trial of Dorsey back in 2006 also urged the governor to commute Dorsey's death sentence to life imprisonment after agreeing that he was a changed man and he truly repented on his actions.

On the other hand, although some of Dorsey's relatives pleaded for mercy on his life, the family members of both Sarah Bonnie and Dorsey asked the governor not to grant clemency to Dorsey, because, according to their joint statement, the murders left the Bonnies' daughter Jade orphaned at a time when children were supposed to be celebrating Christmas (which was two days after her parents' murders) and he had done the heinous act of killing his cousin and her husband despite their kindness and warmth, and Dorsey deserved two death sentences for the double murder.

On April 8, 2024, the eve of Dorsey's execution, Parson rejected the clemency petition and ordered the execution to go ahead.

=== Final appeals ===
Meanwhile, during the time when Dorsey was seeking clemency from the Missouri governor, Dorsey filed last-minute appeals in the hope of staving off his execution and seeking a post-conviction review of his case.

On March 21, 2024, the date of Dorsey's 52nd birthday, the Missouri Supreme Court refused to grant a stay of execution, and rejected Dorsey's application for a fresh review of his case.

On April 9, 2024, hours before Dorsey's scheduled execution, the U.S Supreme Court declined to halt Dorsey's execution and ordered that the execution should move forward.

== Execution ==
On April 9, 2024, 18 years after the double murder, 52-year-old Brian Joseph Dorsey was formally put to death via lethal injection at Eastern Reception, Diagnostic and Correctional Center. In his last statement, Dorsey expressed remorse and sorrow for the murders of his cousin and her husband, and in his own words, Dorsey said, "Words cannot hold the just weight of my guilt and shame." Dorsey was pronounced dead at 6:11 pm after a single dose of pentobarbital was administered to him in the death chamber.

In a statement after their client's execution, Dorsey's lawyers expressed disappointment and sadness over the denial of clemency for their client, whom they believed to be full of contrition for his actions. The response of the couple's families were divided: some relatives did not support the execution, including one of Dorsey's cousins Jenni Gerhauser (also related to Sarah Bonnie), who stated that she held on to hope that Dorsey would be spared the death sentence and she did not agree with executing Dorsey despite acknowledging the heinous nature of the murders. Other family members of Dorsey and the Bonnies wanted Dorsey to be executed for the sake of achieving justice, and described their pain and sadness of losing the couple 18 years ago, and lamented the couple's absence in the life of their only daughter, which originated from the actions of a "family member that proclaimed to love (Sarah)".

Missouri Governor Mike Parson released an official statement after the execution of Dorsey, affirming his support for the execution to move forward in accordance to state law. Parson stated that the pain caused by Dorsey to his family could by no means be rectified, and that Dorsey smote his loving family for helping him in a time of need, and inside the sanctity of their home where he was surrounded by family and love, Dorsey repaid the kindness and love of his cousins with "cruelty, inhumane violence, and murder". For this, Parson defended his decision to reject clemency and stated he had done so to ensure the course of justice was delivered and to provide closure to the victims and their families.

For his last meal, Dorsey ordered two bacon double cheeseburgers; two orders of chicken strips; two large orders of seasoned fries; and a pizza with sausage, pepperoni, onion, mushrooms, and extra cheese.

Dorsey was the 98th prisoner to be executed in Missouri after the 1976 resumption of capital punishment in the U.S., and he was also the first inmate to be executed by the Missouri state government, as well as the fifth in the U.S. in the year of 2024.

In the aftermath of Dorsey's execution, his case remained debated over whether the death penalty was appropriate in his case, and the possibility of rehabilitation for prisoners who faced capital punishment, and Dorsey's clean behavioural record behind bars was used to support this notion. The practice of providing final meals to the condemned before their executions became a debated matter in light of the last meal requests of Dorsey and some other prisoners like Jamie Ray Mills, who was put to death in Alabama on May 30, 2024, for murdering an elderly couple in 2004.

== See also ==
- Capital punishment in Missouri
- List of people executed in Missouri
- List of people executed in the United States in 2024

Executions carried out in Missouri
Preceded by Johnny Allen Johnson August 1, 2023	Brian Joseph Dorsey; April 9, 2024	Succeeded by David Hosier June 11, 2024
Executions carried out in the United States
Preceded by Michael Dewayne Smith – Oklahoma April 4, 2024	Brian Joseph Dorsey – Missouri; April 9, 2024	Succeeded by Jamie Ray Mills – Alabama May 30, 2024
