= Ronald Alan Knight =

American convicted murderer (born 1968)

- Born: June 26, 1968 (age 58); Florida, U.S.
- Status: Incarcerated on death row
- Convictions: First degree murder (×2); Robbery (×2); Motor vehicle theft Grand theft Burglary
- Penalty: 1995: Life without parole; 1998: Death

Details
- Victims: 2
- Date: July 8, 1993 – May 8, 1995
- Country: United States
- State: Florida
- Location: Palm Beach County, Florida (1993–1995)
- Date apprehended: June 1995
- Imprisoned at: Union Correctional Institution

Ronald Alan Knight (born June 26, 1968) is an American convicted murderer who killed two homosexual men between 1993 and 1995 in Palm Beach, Florida. On July 8, 1993, Knight and two other men lured 32-year-old Richard Kunkel from a gay bar and robbed him, and Kunkel was shot and murdered by Knight. Two years later, on May 8, 1995, Knight and an accomplice robbed 22-year-old Brendan Meehan after luring him from another gay nightclub, and Meehan was also killed by Knight during the robbery. In both cases, Knight's motive was determined to be influenced by hatred against homosexuality.

Knight was originally arrested and charged with the second-degree murder of Kunkel, but the prosecution dropped the charges in January 1995 after the witnesses refused to testify. Knight was re-arrested months later after he murdered Meehan. He was convicted of first-degree murder later that year and despite the jury's unanimous vote for capital punishment, Knight was sentenced to life without parole by the judge who overruled the jury's verdict of death.

After he was convicted of murdering Meehan, Knight was charged with the murder of Kunkel a second time, and the charges were upgraded to first-degree murder this time round. Knight was sentenced to death in 1998 after he was convicted of first-degree murder in his second trial, and he remains on death row as of 2026.

== Early life ==
Born on June 26, 1968, Ronald Alan Knight reportedly had a normal and happy childhood, and initially performed well in school. When he was nine years old, his parents divorced, and according to his family and defence lawyers, Knight's life took a turn for the worse as a result of his parents' separation, as his grades began to fail and he also started to play truant and hang out with other delinquents. At the age of 12, Knight began to abuse marijuana, as well as cocaine, and also began to habitually set fires. According to Knight's maternal grandmother, at one point when her grandson was 13, his mother began a relationship with another man, and Knight was not allowed to go into the trailer where the couple slept, and was forced to spend the night in the car.

== Murder of Richard Kunkel ==
Timothy Craig Pearson

On July 8, 1993, Ronald Knight committed his first murder by robbing and fatally shooting a man he lured from a local gay bar in Palm Beach, Florida.

Knight and his two co-defendants, Timothy Craig Pearson and Dain Brennalt, agreed to commit robbery by luring a male patron from a local gay bar and they would beat and rob their selected victim. The trio approached one of the bar's patrons, 32-year-old Richard Kunkel, and invited him to come over for a party with them, and Kunkel accepted their invitation. After departing the premises, Kunkel drove his car and followed the trio, who were driving in their own vehicle. The group reached a restaurant to have a meal together, before they rode off in the trio's car, after persuading Kunkel to join them and leave his own car behind.

Along the way, the group stopped twice along the roads to relieve themselves. At the second stop, before they returned to the car, Knight took out his gun and pointed it at Kunkel, instructing him to take off his jeans. As Kunkel complied out of fear, Knight fired a single shot at the back of Kunkel, leaving him mortally wounded. After Kunkel fell to the ground, Knight ordered both Brennalt and Pearson to search Kunkel's pockets, before he and Pearson dragged the dying Kunkel's body to a canal and threw him in, leaving him to die there. Knight threatened the two men to not tell anyone about the murder or they would be killed as well. Evidence showed that both Pearson and Brennalt were unaware all along of Knight's plan to murder Kunkel.

The trio, who stole Kunkel's wallet and keys, returned to the restaurant later that night, where Kunkel's car was left behind, and stolen it. They later went to the apartment of Kunkel to steal more items. Kunkel's body was later discovered in the canal by the driver of a road grader on the afternoon of July 9, 1993, about a day after he was killed. An autopsy was conducted by the medical examiner, who confirmed that Kunkel died of a gunshot wound to the chest.

Nearly a year after the murder of Kunkel, Knight was arrested on May 11, 1994, and charged with first-degree murder, armed burglary and grand theft auto. The charges of first-degree murder were later downgraded to second-degree murder, and Knight was supposed to stand trial on January 3, 1995. However, before his trial began, Knight telephoned the witnesses from prison and threatened them to not testify against him in his upcoming trial. Out of fear for their lives and safety of their families, the witnesses backed out and one of them even provided a false alibi for Knight. The prosecution were eventually forced to drop the charges, and Knight was released on a $20,000 bail.

== Murder of Brendan Meehan ==
Sean Paul Stephens

On May 8, 1995, merely four months after he was released from prison, Ronald Knight committed another robbery which led to the murder of a second person, who was also homosexual like Kunkel.

On that day, Knight, who bought two .25 caliber semiautomatic pistols, invited Sean Stephens to commit robbery together and target a man from a gay bar. At that time, Stephens was staying in Knight's apartment after he spent the afternoon snorkeling, drinking beer and smoking marijuana with his girlfriend and the son of Knight's girlfriend. Stephens accepted Knight's invitation, and thus they both armed themselves with the guns and went out together in Knight's car. Eventually, they parked outside a gay bar in West Palm Beach, and waited for a target to no avail, before they moved on to a gay dance club in suburban West Palm Beach.

Subsequently, Stephens found a person to rob and together, both Knight and Stephens hatched the plan to go to the apartment of their targeted victim to rob him. The pair approached the victim, 22-year-old Brendan Scott Meehan, who was captured on surveillance camera leaving the club with the two men. Knight and Meehan got inside the latter's car and drove away from the club, with Stephens following them in Knight's car. However, when they stopped halfway at a secluded area for Knight to relieve himself first, Knight wielded his gun and shot Meehan to death. Stephens said that when he confronted Knight about the killing, Knight pointed at the gun and warned him to not be "number two".

After the murder of Meehan, Knight stole his wallet, credit cards, pager, necklace, stereo equipment, sneakers and car, and both Knight and Stephens left the area, leaving the body of Meehan behind, where it was found about five hours after he last departed from the gay club. Stephens helped Knight to dispose of Knight's bloodstained clothes and some of Meehan's stolen belongings. Stephens went to Knight's apartment the next day and brought along the stolen stereo equipment from Meehan's car, and they traded it for marijuana with a friend.

== Charges for Meehan's murder ==
On May 13, 1995, five days after the murder of Meehan, Ronald Knight was arrested by the police. Sean Stephens was also arrested by the police for the murder.

On May 14, 1995, both Ronald Knight and Sean Stephens were charged with robbery, grand theft auto and first-degree murder, and a judge denied bail for Knight. Knight's lover was also charged with helping to dispose of the gun believed to be the murder weapon behind Meehan's killing.

The killing of Meehan brought shock and outrage from the gay community of South Florida, and several gay and human rights activists called for justice to be served and urged the authorities to classify Meehan's murder as a hate crime, given that Meehan was targeted due to his homosexuality. The similarities between the murders of both Meehan and Richard Kunkel also alarmed the authorities and gay community, and the Palm Beach County Sheriff's Office expressed their intent to re-investigate the Kunkel case for potential revival of murder charges.

On June 8, 1995, a Palm Beach County grand jury formally indicted both Stephens and Knight for armed robbery and first-degree murder under the state's anti-hate crime laws. Under these statutes, if the robbery charge was proven to be a hate crime, the maximum penalty could be enhanced from the usual five years to 15 years. Under Florida state law, both Knight and Stephens could face the death penalty as the maximum sentence for first-degree murder.

On August 15, 1995, Palm Beach County Circuit Judge Edward Rodgers issued a court order to temporarily stop Knight from using the phone in prison. It was revealed that during the past three months when Knight was in custody for Meehan's murder, he allegedly intimidated potential witnesses in his case to force them not to testify against him like he did in 1994 when he was previously detained for the murder of Kunkel.

On August 17, 1995, Circuit Judge James Carlisle ordered Knight to be completely deprived of his privileges to make phone calls, extending the ban to his immediate family members, to prevent the possibility of Knight threatening the witnesses and forcing them to not testify against him. The ban was to last until Knight's trial for the murder of Meehan was completed.

Two months after his arrest, on August 31, 1995, Sean Stephens accepted a plea offer before trial and admitted to lesser charges of second-degree murder, armed robbery and grand theft-Hate Crime, in exchange for a sentence of ten years' imprisonment with the possible chance for parole after seven years. Stephens also agreed to testify against Knight, who was set to go on trial a week later in early September 1995 for Meehan's murder.

== Trial for Meehan's murder ==
=== Proceedings and conviction ===
On September 5, 1995, jury selection began for the trial of Knight. The prosecution sought to introduce additional evidence of Knight's involvement in the murder of Richard Kunkel to prove his motive of robbing and murdering a homosexual man, and also the fact that both murders were similar to one another. However, the defence opposed to this request since Knight was not yet convicted of killing Kunkel and the trial judge eventually denied admitting this as evidence. On September 14, 1995, a 12-member jury was selected, and Knight stood trial four days later before the jury at the Palm Beach County Circuit Court.

During the trial, the prosecution submitted evidence to prove that the murder of Meehan was motivated by Knight's hatred against homosexual men. A former girlfriend of Knight, Heather Bono Edwards, testified that the defendant often spoke about how much he hated the gay people, and believed they should be shot. Another witness, Christopher Holt, the father of Knight's girlfriend's granddaughter, testified that during a session of drinking and smoking marijuana with both Knight and Stephens, he heard Knight talking about a plan to rob someone and rope Stephens into his plan. Stephens came to court to testify against Knight, recounting how they planned to commit robbery and trailed Meehan before Knight shot and murdered Meehan, and how he confronted Knight before the latter aimed the gun at him and warned him to not become his second victim that night, and even helped dispose of the evidence. When cross-examined by the defence regarding the inconsistencies between his initial statements and both his later statements and court testimony, Stephens attributed them to the fact that he consumed a large amount of alcohol and smoked a lot of marijuana prior to his arrest.

When he took the stand to enter his defence, Knight denied that he was the murderer and pinpointed Stephens as the mastermind of the crime. He claimed that after meeting Meehan at the bar, Stephens told him he had a plan to rob the victim, and he later parted ways with the two men, and later smoked marijuana with a friend at a park. Knight said that when Stephens asked him to meet him at a housing development, he saw him washing the blood off Meehan's hands, and they took some stereo equipment from Meehan's car, and exchanged it for some cocaine the next day. However, the prosecution questioned the credibility of his account, rebutting that there were testimonies proving that Knight was the prime mover of the robbery and had a clear motive to rob and kill Meehan because of his hatred towards homosexual people, which Knight denied throughout the cross-examination.

On September 29, 1995, after a trial lasting ten days, the jury unanimously found Knight guilty of the first-degree murder of Brendan Meehan. A sentencing trial was scheduled to take place on November 15, 1995. Following Knight's murder conviction at the conclusion of his trial, Stephens was sentenced on October 12, 1995 — roughly a month after testifying against Knight — to ten years in prison under the terms of his plea agreement.

=== Sentencing phase ===
Knight's sentencing trial took place in mid-November 1995. During the proceedings, the defence brought up the evidences of Knight's troubled childhood in their submissions to oppose the death penalty for Knight, and a sexology counselor summoned by the defence testified that Knight had a rare form of paranoid personality disorder which caused him to have inner conflicts regarding his sexuality and have emotional outbursts towards homosexuals, and while it did not cause psychotic episodes, it could lead to a "paranoid break with reality". Gregory Otto, a clinical sociologist, testified that the divorce between Knight's parents and the loss of a stable family structure and parents contributed to Knight's downward spiral.

On November 17, 1995, after 12 minutes of deliberation, the jury unanimously recommended Knight to receive the death penalty for murdering Meehan. On December 4, 1995, during a final hearing before his formal sentencing, Knight continued to insist he was innocent and denied the claims that he was unremorseful, explaining that he cannot feel that way for a crime he never commit, and felt sorry for the family of Meehan. The prosecution urged the judge to adhere to the jury's decision and sentence him to death so as to demonstrate the need for accountability and punishment.

On December 8, 1995, Senior Judge Edward Rodgers overrode the jury's unanimous vote for capital punishment, and instead sentenced Knight to two consecutive life sentences without the possibility of parole, plus an additional 15 years for committing a hate crime. In his sentencing verdict, Judge Rodgers expressed concern that the jury had not taken adequate time to weigh the aggravating and mitigating factors before reaching its verdict. He also pointed out that co-defendant Sean Stephens had received a ten-year prison term via a plea deal, questioning the fairness of plea bargaining practices that allow guilty parties to avoid harsher accountability. Consequently, he rejected the jury's recommendation and imposed life imprisonment.

Judge Rodgers's ruling drew sharp criticism from both the jury and the prosecution. One juror stated that the panel had reached a clear consensus that Knight deserved the death penalty, while the jury foreman noted that not a single juror had spoken in favor of life imprisonment. According to the foreman, the panel firmly rejected the argument that Knight's troubled childhood and paranoid personality warranted sparing his life. Prosecutor Andrew Slater also voiced disagreement, emphasizing that the jury had decisively recommended execution. Under Florida state law, the prosecution was barred from appealing against the convict's life sentence and seeking the death penalty if the capital trial ended with a sentence of life rather than death.

== Trial for Kunkel's murder ==
=== Renewal of murder charges ===
After he was sentenced to life in prison for the murder of Brendan Meehan, Ronald Knight once again faced a potential murder charge and death sentence as the Palm Beach County Sheriff's Office announced their intention to re-open the investigations into the murder of Richard Kunkel, making it possible to charge Knight a second time for killing Kunkel. Meehan's mother, Carole Meehan Hetzel, supported the decision as she hoped that Knight would be held accountable for the murder of Kunkel, stating that Kunkel did not deserve to die just like her son did.

In late October 1997, Knight fired his court-appointed lawyer. Three months later, on January 8, 1998, Knight was allowed to represent himself in court without a lawyer.

=== Conviction of Pearson and Brennalt ===
Dain Brennalt, one of Knight's two accomplices in the Kunkel case, was arrested on March 21, 1997, and he was charged with accessory after the fact of murder. Timothy Craig Pearson, the other defendant, surrendered himself on May 19, 1997, and he was charged with first-degree murder with a firearm and armed robbery of a firearm.

On May 29, 1997, Brennalt was sentenced to five years' probation for being an accessory to murder as part of the plea agreement, in exchange for his testimony against Knight. However, more than a year later, in July 1998, Brennalt violated his probation after being charged with misdemeanor marijuana possession and driving with a revoked license during a traffic stop. In September 1998, he accepted a plea agreement — a decision which spared him both the drug charge and a potential one-year maximum sentence had the case gone to a jury trial — and was sentenced to ten days in jail.

While pending trial for Kunkel's murder, Pearson was released on $25,000 bail in December 1997 after spending seven months in custody, and was allowed to remain free before his murder trial on the condition that he did not possess a firearm or contact any witnesses of the case, and that he was ordered to live with his mother throughout the bail period. On March 17, 1998, Pearson accepted a plea deal from the prosecution, which required him to serve three years in prison for lesser charges of armed robbery and being an accessory after the fact of murder, and he was also given time credit for the 240 days he spent in pre-trial detention. Pearson spent nearly one year in prison under his sentence before he was released on March 1, 1999.

=== Trial and death penalty ===
Five years after he murdered Kunkel, Knight was finally brought to trial for the crime in March 1998. Knight, who waived his right to a jury trial and opted to have a judge to hear his case, represented himself in court and

On March 16, 1998, Palm Beach County Circuit Court Judge Edward A. Garrison found Knight guilty of the first-degree murder of Richard Kunkel, as well as armed robbery, burglary and grand theft. As a result of his conviction, Knight faced a possible death sentence.

In April 1998, Knight attended his second sentencing trial. The defence argued for the judge to not impose the death penalty, and a psychiatrist and psychologist testified that Knight suffered from emotional and mental disorders. Knight's mother and sister were also called to the stand. The prosecution argued for the death penalty, and Sheriff’s Office Detective John Van Houten, who was in charge of investigating the Brendan Meehan murder case, came to court as a prosecution witness.

On May 29, 1998, Knight was sentenced to death by Judge Garrison, marking the judge's first imposition of the death penalty in a capital case. In response to the verdict of death, Knight's wife insisted her husband was never a murderer and justice was not served, but Kunkel's sister supported the decision and said Knight deserved to be put to death.

Knight was the 11th person in Palm Beach County to be given the death penalty since 1978. It was reported that annually, the Palm Beach County State Attorney’s Office would seek the death penalty for about half of the 45 first-degree murder cases, but according to the spokesperson Mike Edmondson, despite the strong public support for capital punishment, the jurors would rarely cast their vote in agreement of execution. West Palm Beach defense attorney James Eisenberg, who was not involved in the trial, commented on the ruling, describing Knight as a "homophobic serial killer" and stated that such offenders would face the death penalty.

== Death row ==
After he was sentenced to death, Ronald Knight was incarcerated on death row at the Union Correctional Institution since December 21, 1995, and is still listed on the state's death row as of 2026.

A 2013 report revealed that Knight was one of 18 Palm Beach County prisoners awaiting execution on Florida's death row. By October 2021, among more than 300 inmates on Florida's death row, there were eight Palm Beach County inmates, including Knight, on the state's death row list.

In October 2026, 33 years after the murder of Kunkel, his nephew Brian appealed to the Florida Governor Ron DeSantis to sign a death warrant for Knight, with hopes that Knight could be executed soon enough for the murder of his late uncle. At that point, Kunkel's parents had died while waiting for Knight to be executed. It was also reported that a representative from the Florida Attorney General's Office began to expedite clemency proceedings in Knight's case, which could pave way to the possibility of setting an execution date for Knight in the near future.

=== Appeals ===
On November 2, 2000, the Florida Supreme Court rejected Ronald Knight's appeal and upheld his death sentence.

On December 15, 2016, the Florida Supreme Court upheld the death sentence of Knight and dismissed his appeal.

On May 1, 2020, the 11th Circuit Court of Appeals rejected Knight's appeal against his death sentence.

On April 5, 2021, Knight's final petition for a writ of certiorari was denied by the United States Supreme Court.

== See also ==
- Capital punishment in Florida
- List of death row inmates in the United States § Florida
