= Murder of Steven Bauer =

1992 murder of a Florida police officer

- Steven Ernest Bauer
- Location: North Miami, Florida, United States
- Date: January 3, 1992
- Attack type: Murder; Bank robbery
- Victim: Steven Ernest Bauer
- Verdict: Guilty
- Convictions: First-degree murder Robbery; Aggravated assault Burglary (2 counts); Motor vehicle theft (2 counts)
- Sentence: Gonzalez and Franqui; Death; San Martin and Fernandez; Death, commuted to life imprisonment without parole Abreu; Life imprisonment without parole
- Convicted: Leonardo Franqui; Pablo San Martin; Ricardo Maldonado Gonzalez; Pablo Abrea Abreu; Fernando Augustine Fernandez

On January 3, 1992, in North Miami, Florida, five men committed an armed robbery at Kislak National Bank, where they stole a cash box and fatally shot North Miami Police Detective Sergeant Steven Ernest Bauer (July 15, 1952 – January 3, 1992). The men were later arrested and charged with the murder of Sergeant Bauer.

One of the co-defendants, Pablo Abreu, was sentenced to life in prison after pleading guilty. The remaining four – Fernando Fernandez, Ricardo Gonzalez, Leonardo Franqui, and Pablo San Martin – were sentenced to death for the murder. However, Fernandez and San Martin had their sentences commuted to life imprisonment upon appeal, although San Martin remains under a separate death sentence for a second murder case. Fernandez died in prison in 2018.

Ricardo Gonzalez is scheduled for execution on December 1, 2026.

== Murder ==
On the morning of January 3, 1992, an off-duty police officer was murdered in the line of duty by five bank robbers while he was escorting two bank tellers to the Kislak National Bank in North Miami, Florida.

Ten days before the crime, the five robbers plotted to commit armed robbery at the bank, and as part of their plan, two of the co-conspirators – 19-year-old Fernando Augustine Fernandez (June 6, 1972 – February 4, 2018) and 24-year-old Pablo San Martin (born July 23, 1967) – stole two gray Chevrolet Caprices to use as their getaway vehicles and to confuse any potential witnesses. Among the five men, 37-year-old Pablo Abrea Abreu (born August 15, 1954) served as a getaway driver, positioning one of the stolen vehicles outside the bank prior to the robbery. The remaining two men, 21-year-old Ricardo Maldonado Gonzalez (born January 20, 1970) and 21-year-old Leonardo Franqui (born September 26, 1970), were the only members of the group armed with firearms during the operation.

While the robbers waited outside prior to the bank's opening, 39-year-old North Miami Police Detective Sergeant Steven Ernest Bauer was escorting bank tellers Lasonya Hadley and Michelle Chin-Watson into their drive-up stations. As Sergeant Bauer accompanied the two employees, the perpetrators initiated the robbery. Gonzalez and Franqui fired their guns at Sergeant Bauer, and a cash box containing $17,000 was stolen from one of the drive-in tellers before the group fled in their getaway vehicles. Investigations later showed that Franqui had fired several shots at Sergeant Bauer with a 9mm handgun, while Gonzalez fired once at the officer with a .357 pistol, and forensic reports determined that the fatal wound in Sergeant Bauer's heart was caused by the bullet fired from Gonzalez's gun.

Sergeant Bauer, a decorated 13-year veteran police officer, had a wife, with whom he had three children (aged sixteen, seven and four), and he had six siblings. Sergeant Bauer was born in Baltimore, Maryland, and grew up in Miami Beach, Florida. After reaching adulthood, Sergeant Bauer joined the North Miami Police Department in January 1979, working in uniform patrol, undercover narcotics and marine patrol. During the five years before his death, Sergeant Bauer worked as a general investigative detective and crime-scene technician. Two of his brothers, Robert and Michael, were also Miami Beach police officers.

Sergeant Bauer was the 21st Miami police officer to be killed while in the line of duty since 1980. His funeral wake was held at the Fulford United Methodist Church on January 7, 1992, and it was attended by several hundreds of law enforcement officers from various regions in Florida like Orlando. A memorial fund was set up to provide financial assistance to Sergeant Bauer's bereaved family, and Crime Stoppers offered a $22,000 reward for information or witnesses to ensure the arrest and conviction of the perpetrators.

== Murder charges and trial ==
=== Arrest and charges ===
Two weeks after the murder of Sergeant Steven Bauer, the police arrested all five suspects in the crime. One of the suspects, Fernando Fernandez, who was apparently plagued with guilt over his role as a getaway driver in the murder, consulted a Santeria priest and confided to him about his involvement. While the priest made a special bracelet to attract good luck for him, he ultimately chose to alert the authorities about Fernandez's confession. The arrest of Fernandez led to the identification and capture of the other men.

On February 7, 1992, the five men were all charged with multiple counts of first-degree murder, armed robbery, aggravated assault and other offenses, and they pleaded not guilty to those charges.

=== Trials and convictions ===
Pablo Abrea Abreu

One of the perpetrators, Pablo Abreu, pleaded guilty to the charge of first-degree murder for the death of Sergeant Bauer. This decision allowed him to be spared the death sentence for the crime, and he was sentenced to life imprisonment without the possibility of parole on July 2, 1993. Abreu is serving his life sentence at the Marion Correctional Institution as of 2026.

On June 2, 1994, three of the remaining four killers – San Martin, Franqui and Gonzalez – were found guilty of the first-degree murder of Sergeant Bauer. A day later, Fernandez was also convicted of the first-degree murder of Sergeant Bauer.

On September 23, 1994, the jury recommended death sentences for Franqui, Gonzalez and Fernandez, while they recommended life without parole for San Martin.

On October 11, 1994, the four defendants were formally sentenced to death by Judge Rodolfo Sorondo. In his verdict, Judge Sorondo explained that he chose to override the jury's recommended sentence of life imprisonment for San Martin and imposed the death penalty because life imprisonment was manifestly inadequate. He pointed out that San Martin was also convicted and sentenced to death for another murder.

=== Murder of Raul Lopez ===
Apart from the murder of Sergeant Bauer, Franqui, San Martin and Abreu were investigated and charged in a second robbery-murder case. In that case, on December 6, 1991, the trio shot and killed 46-year-old Raul Lopez during an armed robbery in Hialeah, Florida.

The men were tried and convicted of the first-degree murder of Lopez. San Martin and Franqui were sentenced to death on November 24, 1993, while Abreu was sentenced to life imprisonment on July 2, 1993.

== Appeal process ==
=== San Martin ===
Pablo San Martin

After his trial, San Martin appealed his death sentence to the Florida Supreme Court. On June 11, 1998, the court accepted San Martin's appeal and overturned his death sentence for killing Sergeant Steven Bauer, after they found that the trial judge had erred in overriding the jury's recommendation for life in prison and imposing the death sentence, and there were insufficient reasons for the judge to depart from the jury's decision in terms of sentence. As a result of this ruling, San Martin was resentenced to life in prison without the possibility of parole.

Despite escaping the death penalty for Sergeant Bauer's murder, San Martin still faced a death sentence for the 1991 murder of Raul Lopez. In a separate appeal ruled on December 24, 1997, the Florida Supreme Court upheld San Martin's death sentence for Lopez's murder. A second appeal was denied by the Florida Supreme Court on August 28, 2008.

On February 27, 2018, the Florida Supreme Court rejected the resentencing petitions of San Martin and eight other inmates on death row. The court found that in the cases of San Martin and the other eight prisoners, their death sentences were imposed and finalized before June 24, 2002, the date of the landmark case Ring v. Arizona, and the newly enacted law, which allowed death sentences to be meted out only through unanimous jury votes, could not retroactively apply to their sentences. However, this new law was only in effect until 2023, when the state of Florida passed a new law to allow non-unanimous jury votes from eight or more jurors to impose death sentences, partly due to the notorious school shooter Nikolas Cruz escaping the death sentence for 17 murders after the jury failed to unanimously decide on a death sentence.

As of 2026, San Martin remains on death row for the murder of Lopez at the Union Correctional Institution.

=== Fernandez ===
Fernando Augustine Fernandez

On February 25, 1999, the Florida Supreme Court overturned Fernando Fernandez's death sentence in a 6–1 decision, ordering that he be resentenced to life in prison on appeal. In its grounds of decision, the court noted that Fernandez did not act as a triggerman. Comparing his role to co-defendants in the Steven Bauer murder case who did not open fire and received life sentences rather than the death penalty, the court determined that Fernandez's death sentence was manifestly excessive and therefore commuted it to life imprisonment.

After the commutation of his death sentence, Fernandez remained behind bars serving his life sentence for the next 19 years, before he died in prison in February 2018 at the age of 45. The exact cause of his death was never made public.

=== Franqui ===
FDOC mugshot of Leonardo Franqui

Since the end of his murder trials, Leonardo Franqui filed multiple appeals against his two death sentences for the murders of both Lopez and Sergeant Bauer. Franqui's first death sentence appeal, relating to the murder of Lopez, was rejected on June 26, 1997.

On July 3, 1997, the Florida Supreme Court ordered a new sentencing hearing for Franqui after hearing and approving his appeal against the death sentence for Sergeant Bauer's murder. On March 23, 1998, the U.S. Supreme Court denied the prosecution's appeal and affirmed the lower court's decision to approve a re-sentencing trial for Franqui.

On August 31, 1998, the jury voted 10–2 to re-impose the death penalty for Franqui. Judge Rodolfo Sorondo re-sentenced Franqui to death on September 18, 1998.

On October 18, 2001, the Florida Supreme Court rejected Franqui's appeal against his second death sentence for Sergeant Bauer's murder.

On January 6, 2011, Franqui lost another appeal against his death sentence in Lopez's murder.

On January 26, 2017, the Florida Supreme Court granted a new court hearing for Franqui to determine if his intellectual disability should exempt him from the death penalty in both the cases of Sergeant Bauer and Lopez. The proceedings first began in October 2017 at the Miami-Dade County Circuit Court, with Judge Ellen Sue Venzer hearing the appeal. Sergeant Bauer's son, who was three at the time of his father's murder, attended the hearing and he reportedly stated that Franqui deserved to be put to death for murdering his father.

Ultimately, the circuit court dismissed Franqui's appeal. On May 7, 2020, the Florida Supreme Court denied Franqui's follow-up appeal for post-conviction relief and dismissed his claims of intellectual disability. They additionally ruled that despite the non-unanimous jury votes that led to his two death sentences (10–2 for Sergeant Bauer's murder, and 9–3 for Lopez's murder), Franqui was not entitled to be re-sentenced because his sentences were finalized before 2002.

As of 2026, Franqui remains on death row at the Union Correctional Institution.

=== Gonzalez ===
Ricardo Maldonado Gonzalez

On September 18, 1997, the Florida Supreme Court allowed Ricardo Gonzalez's appeal and overturned his death sentence, and ordered that he should receive a resentencing trial, because the trial judge had erred in allowing a co-defendant's confession, which pinpointed Gonzalez as the shooter of the case, to be admitted in court.

On August 20, 1998, a second Miami-Dade County jury recommended by a majority vote of 8–4 to sentence Gonzalez to death for murdering Sergeant Bauer. Judge Robert Scola reinstated Gonzalez's death sentence on September 18, 1998, after he accepted the jury's decision.

On May 10, 2001, the Florida Supreme Court upheld the new death sentence of Gonzalez and refused his appeal.

On July 3, 2008, the Florida Supreme Court dismissed Gonzalez's appeal against his death sentence.

On January 3, 2011, the 11th Circuit Court of Appeals rejected Gonzalez's appeal against his death sentence.

On October 31, 2011, Gonzalez's final petition for a writ of certiorari was denied by the U.S. Supreme Court.

On March 23, 2018, the Florida Supreme Court denied Gonzalez's plea for re-sentencing because in spite of the jury's split vote of 8–4, his sentence was finalized in 2001, a year before the 2002 ruling of Ring v. Arizona, and hence he was ineligible for re-sentencing.

== Scheduled execution of Gonzalez ==
On October 30, 2026, Governor Ron DeSantis signed a death warrant for one of the perpetrators on death row, Ricardo Gonzalez, and authorized an execution date of December 1, 2026.

On November 13, 2026, a circuit court judge denied Gonzalez's post-conviction appeal against his sentence.

As of 2026, Gonzalez is incarcerated on death row at the Florida State Prison, where his sentence is set to be carried out by lethal injection.

== See also ==
- Capital punishment in Florida
- List of death row inmates in the United States § Florida
- List of people scheduled to be executed in the United States
