= Cell phone murders =

1996 mass shooting in Huntsville, Alabama

- Location: Huntsville, Alabama, United States
- Date: September 25, 1996
- Attack type: Mass shooting
- Weapons: 9mm Ruger P89 semi-automatic pistols; Two 9mm Lorcin L9 semi-automatic pistols; .357 Magnum revolver
- Deaths: 4
- Injuries: 2
- Verdict: Guilty
- Convictions: Capital murder Felony murder Attempted murder
- Sentence: Wilson; Death; Acklin; Death; Johnson; 15 years' imprisonment
- Convicted: Nicholas Bernard Acklin, 23; Corey Syleb Johnson, 23; Joey Wilson, 19

On September 25, 1996, in Huntsville, Alabama a mass shooting occurred when, due to a conflict over a stolen cell phone, a group of three men opened fire inside a house, fatally shooting four of the occupants while injuring two others. The perpetrators – Joey Wilson, Nicholas Acklin, and Corey Johnson – were all arrested and charged with multiple counts of capital murder. A total of nineteen rounds were fired by all three perpetrators in the shootings.

Wilson and Acklin were both found guilty of capital murder, and sentenced to death in 1998. Johnson pleaded guilty to felony murder and served 15 years before his release in 2011, before he was subsequently jailed for life in a 2016 murder case. Both Wilson and Acklin are currently on death row at the Holman Correctional Facility.

== Shootings and events prior ==
Nicholas Bernard Acklin

Joey Wilson

Corey Syleb Johnson

On September 25, 1996, before midnight, a group of three men committed a mass shooting at a residential home in Huntsville, Alabama, one of the perpetrators, Joey Wilson, fatally shot four people.

A week prior, on September 18, 1996, the trio – 23-year-old Nicholas Bernard Acklin, 19-year-old Joseph Michael Wilson (better known as Joey Wilson) and 23-year-old Corey Syleb Johnson – visited the house (where the shooting broke out) and expressed their interest in buying marijuana from Ashley Rutherford, who lived in the house with his fiancée Michelle Hayden and his aunt. After the trio saw the drugs, they left briefly, before one of the three men, Johnson, returned and asked to see the marijuana one more time. Once the drugs were shown to him, Johnson grabbed a small amount and left Rutherford's house. However, Charles Lamar Hemphill (better known as Lamar Hemphill), a friend of Rutherford, discovered that his cell phone, which was last seen in Rutherford's house, was missing, and after calling his phone, the recipient of the call was Joey Wilson, one of the three men that came to buy drugs from Rutherford.

Suspecting that Wilson stole his phone during that particular visit, Hemphill filed a complaint to the police. Wilson learned of the complaint a few days after it was lodged, and he was also questioned by the police regarding the matter. Angered by this revelation, Wilson, Acklin, and Johnson decided to seek revenge against Hemphill and the other people responsible for the police complaint. The trio armed themselves with guns and went back to the house on September 25, 1996, a week after the alleged phone theft. At the time when the men arrived, Hayden, Hemphill and Rutherford's two friends, Michael Beaudette and Brian Carter, were present at the house with another two people, Mike Skirchak and Johnny Couch (who both knew Beaudette).

The trio confronted the six and held them hostage, and unknowingly, Rutherford later returned home from work while the hold-up continued, and he became the seventh hostage confined in the house. The seven victims were being assaulted by the trio, and Acklin additionally sexually assaulted Hayden by molesting her and forcing her to remove her clothes; the men were similarly forced to strip until their undergarments were left. The victims denied knowing about the police warrant filed against Wilson, even though Rutherford and Hemphill admitted about the complaint.

Ultimately, Wilson and Acklin used their guns and fired multiple shots at the victims. One of the seven hostages, Mike Skirchak, managed to flee the house during the shooting and was uninjured. However, the remaining six were shot, and four of them – Hemphill, Beaudette, Carter, and Couch – died as a result of fatal gunshot wounds, while both Rutherford and Hayden survived; Rutherford pretended to be dead until the trio departed the house.

== Trials ==
On September 26, 1996, shortly after the murders, the trio were arrested outside the house by the police. The trio – Nicholas Acklin, Corey Johnson and Joey Wilson – were all charged with capital murder, an offence that carries the death penalty under Alabama state law.

On August 25, 1998, a Madison County jury found Wilson guilty of all four counts of capital murder. On August 26, 1998, the jury unanimously recommended the death penalty for Wilson on all four counts of capital murder, and Wilson was formally sentenced to death on September 17, 1998.

On October 23, 1998, Acklin was similarly found guilty of all four capital murder counts before a separate jury, which recommended the death penalty for Acklin on October 31, 1998. On November 6, 1998, Acklin was formally sentenced to death by the trial judge.

On November 1, 1998, Johnson, the last man to stand trial, accepted a plea agreement, and was sentenced to 15 years in prison for lesser charges of felony murder, thus sparing him the possibility of a death sentence for the cell phone murders.

== Appeal process ==
=== Wilson's appeals ===
On November 19, 1999, Joey Wilson's direct appeal was rejected by the Alabama Court of Criminal Appeals.

On June 23, 2000, Wilson's appeal was turned down by the Alabama Supreme Court.

On April 29, 2005, the Alabama Court of Criminal Appeals sent Wilson's case back to the lower courts to re-hear his post-conviction petition against the death sentence.

In September 2013, Wilson petitioned for a new trial.

On June 28, 2024, Wilson's appeal for post-conviction relief was denied by the Alabama Court of Criminal Appeals.

On August 22, 2025, the Alabama Court of Criminal Appeals dismissed Wilson's appeal.

On April 17, 2026, The Alabama Supreme Court denied Wilson's appeal.

=== Acklin's appeals ===
On April 28, 2000, Nicholas Acklin's direct appeal was rejected by the Alabama Court of Criminal Appeals.

On June 20, 2013, Acklin petitioned for a new trial in his case. The hearings were first held in December 2013, during which Acklin argued that he had ineffective trial representation, citing that the evidence of his troubled childhood, mainly the childhood abuse he and his three brothers suffered from his father, were not shown during the trial and the defence submitted that the penalty phase would not have ended with a death sentence without the omission of such important evidence. However, Acklin's trial lawyer stated that Acklin instructed him to not present the evidence of his childhood abuse to the jury back in 1998 during his trial.

On behalf of the defence, a social work expert testified that children exposed to violence early had a higher probability of becoming violent adults, and a Stanford University professor testified that during the trial, Acklin was prescribed with an anti-anxiety drug that was designed to remove emotion, which could have explained his demeanor during the trial and led to the jury's possible misinterpretation that Acklin was indifferent to the brutality of the crime. Several of Acklin's family members, including his mother and one of Acklin's three brothers, testified about the abuse Acklin underwent during his childhood.

On April 16, 2015, the Madison County Circuit Court dismissed Acklin's petition for a new trial, with Judge Chris Comer ruling that Acklin failed to prove that the mitigatory evidence he presented would have undermine the overwhelming evidence of his guilt in murdering the four victims in the cell phone mass murders.

On December 15, 2017, Acklin's appeal to the Alabama Court of Criminal Appeals was also dismissed.

On June 15, 2018, Acklin lost his appeal to the Alabama Supreme Court.

On March 25, 2019, Acklin's appeal was denied by the U.S. Supreme Court.

On December 12, 2024, the 11th Circuit Court of Appeals rejected Acklin's appeal.

On October 6, 2025, Acklin's final appeal was denied by the U.S. Supreme Court.

== Fate of Johnson ==
Corey Johnson, the only member of the trio who evaded the death penalty, served his 15-year sentence at the William E. Donaldson Correctional Facility and was released on September 26, 2011. However, five years later, in 2016, Johnson was arrested for stabbing and killing his girlfriend Candice Wilson, who was coincidentally the sister of his "cell phone murders" accomplice Joey Wilson.

On March 19, 2019, Johnson was formally indicted by a grand jury for capital murder, which carries either a death sentence or life without parole, although the prosecution confirmed they would not seek the death penalty for Johnson.

On December 17, 2020, Johnson pleaded guilty to the murder of his girlfriend, and he was thus sentenced to life imprisonment.

== Aftermath ==
When Corey Johnson, one of the cell phone murderers, was arrested in 2016 for the murder of his girlfriend, his connection to the 1996 cell phone murders brought renewed attention to the case. Paige Edwards, a friend of the victims and perpetrators, commented on the case, remarking that the killings left a deep impact on the lives of everyone related to it.

In May 2017, about 21 years after the incident, the house where the cell phone murders occurred was demolished. Sources reveal that ever since the killings happened, the house remained vacant up until its demolition.

In September 2021, 25 years after the cell phone murders, the families of the deceased victims continued to remember them, and stated that they still waited for justice to be served. Madison County District Attorney Rob Broussard expressed his feelings over the brutal nature of the killings, and Madison County Sheriff Kevin Turner additionally cited the cell phone murders as the worst homicide case he investigated as a police officer. The case still remained as one of the most horrific crimes to happen in Madison County, Alabama.

In 2022, Madison County District Attorney Rob Broussard, who prosecuted both Joey Wilson and Nicholas Acklin and sought death sentences for the pair, did not directly comment on the case, but he stated that he felt it was not easy to decide on whether to pursue capital punishment for suspects charged in capital cases, and he expressed that the death penalty should remain for heinous crimes where circumstances called for it.

== See also ==
- Capital punishment in Alabama
- List of death row inmates in the United States § Alabama
