= Murders of Floyd and Vera Hill =

2004 double murder of an elderly couple in Alabama

- Date: June 24, 2004
- Location: Guin, Alabama, U.S.
- Outcome: Jamie Mills executed on May 30, 2024 for the double murder JoAnn Mills imprisoned for life
- Deaths: Floyd Hill, 87; Vera Hill, 72
- Convicted: Jamie Ray Mills; JoAnn Mills
- Verdict: Guilty
- Convictions: Jamie Mills; Capital murder JoAnn Mills; Murder
- Sentence: Jamie Mills; Death; JoAnn Mills; Life imprisonment

On June 24, 2004, 87-year-old Floyd Hill and his 72-year-old wife Vera Hill were murdered in Guin, Alabama, United States, by an intruder who bludgeoned them severely before stealing $140 and prescription drugs from the couple. Floyd died on the scene; Vera died on September 12, 2004, of complications resulting from her injuries.

The Hills' 30-year-old neighbor, Jamie Ray Mills, was arrested and charged with murdering the couple. Mills was found guilty of the double murder and sentenced to death in 2007, while Mills's wife was convicted of murder but jailed for life. Jamie Mills remained on death row for about 17 years before he was executed on May 30, 2024.

== Double murder ==
At the time of the murder, the Hills were at home when they were approached by Jamie Ray Mills, who was accompanied by his wife, JoAnn Mills. Jamie and JoAnn Mills had just completed an overnight drug use session, in which they smoked methamphetamine together. Mills reportedly asked the Hills if he and his wife could borrow their phone. The couple allowed the Jamie and JoAnn Mills into their house.

Some time after gaining entry into the home of the Hills, Jamie Mills bludgeoned the couple with a machete, tire tool and ballpeen hammer. Mills assaulted Floyd Hill first, while the latter was talking to him in the shed, just as the women were walking back to the porch. Mills then carried out a vicious assault on Vera, who had turned back to the shed after hearing the assault on her husband. Mills and his wife ransacked the house and stole some prescription drugs and $140 before they left the house.

After the attack, the Hills' children and grandchildren, who were unable to reach the couple by phone, lodged a police report, and Guin police officer Larry Webb arrived at the Hills' home shortly after dark. He inspected the house after there was no response to his calls and knocks, and discovered the bodies of the couple inside the padlocked shed. Floyd Hill died of his injuries at the scene. Vera sustained severe head and neck injuries. Despite timely medical intervention, she later died. The autopsies separately conducted on both Floyd and Vera confirmed that both the Hills died from blunt and sharp force trauma; a trauma surgeon from the University of Alabama Hospital testified that Vera would have died within hours if she had not received the treatment she was given on the day of the murder.

== Trial process and appeals ==
Jamie and JoAnn Mills were arrested a day after the double murder, and were later tried before separate courts.

In August 2007, Jamie Mills was tried before a jury at an Alabama state court on two counts of capital murder. Mills's wife, who was called as a witness, testified that she saw her husband wielding a hammer and battering the elderly couple to death. At the end of the trial, Mills was found guilty of both counts of murder by the jury. The sentencing hearing ended with the 12-member jury deciding that, based on a majority opinion of 11 to one, Mills should be sentenced to death for the double murder.

It was revealed after the trial of Jamie Mills that his wife JoAnn, who originally faced the same charges of capital murder as her husband, agreed to plead guilty to lesser charges of murder, provided that she turned state's evidence against her husband. After admitting to her role in the murders, JoAnn was sentenced to life imprisonment with the possibility of parole. The earliest date for a parole hearing is December 2027.

After his trial, Jamie Mills appealed several times to higher courts (both state and federal) against his death sentence, maintaining he was innocent and arguing that the plea bargain with his wife might have caused his wife to lie about his involvement in the murders. All of the appeals were rejected, including those in 2006, 2008 and 2016.

== Death warrant ==
On January 31, 2024, less than a week after the state conducted its first execution via nitrogen gas inhalation, the Alabama Attorney General’s Office filed a motion to the Alabama Supreme Court, seeking approval to schedule a date of execution for Jamie Mills. Unlike the previous execution of Kenneth Eugene Smith, the state asked to carry out the death sentence of Mills via the primary method of lethal injection. In the same state, another lethal injection execution was scheduled for July 18, 2024.

On March 21, 2024, the Alabama Supreme Court approved the death warrant on Mills, and directed the state's governor, Kay Ivey, to schedule his execution date. Six days later, Mills's tentative execution date was slated as May 30, 2024.

By May 16, 2024, Mills filed last-minute appeals, hoping to delay his execution. His appeals centered on his claims of innocence and opposition to "torturous" execution procedures.

U.S. District Judge Scott Coogler dismissed Mills's appeal on May 20, 2024, after he found that the claims made by Mills, including those in relation to the plea bargain of Mills's wife, could not aid him in escaping the death sentence, and noted that his arguments had been repeatedly rejected in previous appeals. Chief U.S. District Judge Emily C. Marks rejected Mills's separate petition for a stay of execution, describing it as "inexplicable and inexcusable" and deplored the practice of filing last-minute appeals and requests for stay of execution when the facts of the case had been repeatedly upheld, stating that such abuse of court processes should be stopped.

The 11th Circuit Court of Appeals rejected a follow-up appeal from Mills on May 28, 2024, after finding "no reasonable jurist could conclude that the district court abused its discretion", and allowed the execution to move forward. On the same date when the ruling was made, several opponents of capital punishment, including representatives of Death Penalty Action, submitted a petition to Governor Ivey for clemency, with hopes of commuting Mills's death sentence to life without parole.

The U.S. Supreme Court would hear Mills's final appeal on the date of his execution, and similarly rejected it, clearing the way for Mills's execution to proceed.

== Execution ==
On May 30, 2024, Jamie Mills, then 50, was executed via lethal injection at Holman Correctional Facility. Mills expressed his love for his family, including his brother and sister who were present to witness the execution. Members of the victims’ family were also present, and they stated that justice had been served for the Hills after 20 years.

For his last meal, Mills ordered a seafood platter with three large shrimp, two catfish filets, three oysters, three onion rings and one stuffed crab.

The Equal Justice Initiative, a civil group, stated that the execution of Mills, whom they believed to be innocent, was "tragically regrettable and mournfully unjust" and accused the prosecutors of having "lied, deceived and misrepresented" the facts of the case to make Mills appear guilty. They stated that his case reinforced the wrongfulness of capital punishment. Attorney General Steve Marshall described the murders of Floyd and Vera Hill as "cold and calculated" killings carried out by Mills; he stated that there was ample evidence to prove that Mills was guilty of the double murder.

Mills's execution was the second execution in Alabama in 2024 and the sixth in the U.S. that year. Mills was the first person executed in Alabama after the state's first nitrogen gas execution a few months earlier.

== See also ==
- Capital punishment in Alabama
- List of people executed in Alabama
- List of people executed in the United States in 2024

Executions carried out in Alabama
Preceded by Kenneth Eugene Smith January 25, 2024	Jamie Ray Mills; May 30, 2024	Succeeded by Keith Edmund Gavin July 18, 2024
Executions carried out in the United States
Preceded by Brian Joseph Dorsey – Missouri April 9, 2024	Jamie Ray Mills – Alabama; May 30, 2024	Succeeded by David Hosier – Missouri June 11, 2024
