= 2012 Wicksburg nightclub shooting =

Mass shooting in Alabama, U.S.

- Location: 31.2428°N 85.6307°W; Wicksburg, Alabama, U.S.
- Date: August 9, 2012
- Attack type: Murders and mass shooting
- Weapon: 9mm Glock semi-automatic pistol
- Deaths: 3
- Injuries: 1
- Perpetrators: Ryan Clark Petersen, 22

The 2012 Wicksburg nightclub shooting occurred on August 9, 2012, when 22-year-old Ryan Clark Petersen (born 1989) armed himself with a gun and fired multiple shots in a nightclub in Wicksburg, Alabama, United States, which led to the deaths of three people – club owner Cameron Eubanks, patron Thomas Robins Jr. and club dancer Tiffani Paige Grissett – and a fourth person injured. According to sources, Petersen was earlier driven out of the club due to alleged bad behaviour, and Petersen returned there to carry out the shooting. Petersen was found guilty of multiple counts of capital murder, and sentenced to death on March 24, 2017. He is currently on death row awaiting execution.

== Shooting ==
On August 9, 2012, in Wicksburg, Alabama, a disgruntled patron at the Teasers nightclub opened fire inside the club, resulting in the murders of three people and a fourth person wounded.

Prior to the incident, the shooter, 22-year-old Ryan Clark Petersen, went to the bar for drinks. However, he was driven out of the bar by security due to bad behaviour, related to Petersen having a dispute with one of the dancers about a "dollar dance", which Petersen claimed he was being "ripped off" by the dancer. Petersen became hostile and aggressive despite the attempt of a staff member to calm him down and refund him the money, which led to him being driven out of the nightclub.

After he was driven out, Petersen did not return home. Instead, he walked to his car to retrieve his pistol, and he walked towards the front door, where the owner's 20-year-old son Cameron Eubanks was standing. Petersen shot Eubanks six times, twice in the chest, twice in the abdomen, once in the pelvic region and once in the head. Eubanks died and collapsed on the ground. Petersen entered the nightclub and once again opened fire multiple times inside the store. Two more people were shot dead: one of them was 59-year-old patron Thomas Robins Jr. (who was fatally shot in the chest at a private dance room), while another was 31-year-old club dancer Tiffani Paige Grissett (who was shot twice in her back at the club's main room). Another patron, 33-year-old Scotty Russell, was shot in the arm but managed to play dead.

After the shooting, Petersen fled the scene, and the police conducted a seven-hour manhunt to arrest Petersen, who was identified as the shooter. Seven hours later, Petersen was found hiding in a wooded area located about half a mile from the crime scene, and he was arrested by the police without putting up resistance.

== Murder charges and pre-trial process ==
On August 10, 2012, Ryan Petersen was charged with three counts of capital murder for killing three of the four victims in the shooting. Petersen was also charged with one count of attempted murder for injuring the fourth victim. Under Alabama state law, the offence of capital murder warrants either life imprisonment without the possibility of parole or the death penalty. Petersen was assigned with two court-appointed lawyers as his trial defence counsel.

On September 26, 2012, a Houston County grand jury formally indicted Petersen for the three counts of capital murder and one count of attempted murder. On that same sat, a fourth count of capital murder, related to the killing of two or more people in a single event, was also added to the indictment.

On October 9, 2012, Petersen officially pleaded not guilty by reason of insanity, and a mental competency hearing was slated to determine if he was fit to plead and stand trial.

The trial date of Petersen was tentatively slated to take place during the spring of 2014.

On August 9, 2016, it was confirmed that Petersen would stand trial earliest by December 2016.

== Background of the shooter ==
Ryan Clark Petersen

Ryan Clark Petersen, born in 1989, reportedly came from a dysfunctional family background. When he was six, Petersen's father Nicholas Petersen, who purportedly had behavioral problems including a compulsive need order and neatness, committed suicide by jumping off the bridge. Petersen's biological mother had multiple relationships with several other men, and Petersen experienced multiple instances of abuse from his stepfathers, as well as rejection and neglect from his family.

Petersen struggled with substance abuse and alcoholism during his early years. By the time he turned 12, Petersen had started to drink alcohol, huffed gasoline and abused both marijuana and cough medicine. After reaching adulthood, Petersen enlisted in the United States Navy, but was discharged in 2011 after ten months of military service, mainly due to undeclared mental health issues. Petersen was reportedly ostracised and friendless during his time in the navy.

== Murder trial ==
On December 5, 2016, jury selection commenced for the upcoming capital murder trial of Ryan Petersen.

During the trial, the defence argued that Petersen was intoxicated by alcohol at the time of the murders and he did not have either the intent to kill or the consciousness of his actions. The prosecution, however, sought to refute that Petersen was capable of

On December 22, 2016, the jury found Petersen guilty of all three counts of capital murder. His sentencing trial was scheduled to take place on January 3, 2017.

On January 5, 2017, by a majority vote of 10–2, the jury recommended the death penalty for Petersen.

On March 22, 2017, Petersen was formally sentenced to death via lethal injection by Circuit Judge Brad Mendheim, who followed the jury's recommendation.

== Death row and appeals ==
A February 2021 report listed Ryan Petersen as one of 167 prisoners incarcerated on death row in Alabama.

As of January 2024, when the state of Alabama first carried out the execution of Kenneth Eugene Smith by nitrogen hypoxia, Petersen was one of 17 inmates still held on death row for murders committed within Houston County. A March 2025 report revealed that of all 156 inmates on Alabama's death row, Petersen remained listed as one of 19 inmates awaiting execution for murders committed in southeast Alabama.

As of 2025, Petersen remains incarcerated on death row at the Holman Correctional Facility.

=== Appeals ===
On April 26, 2017, Petersen filed his first appeal, seeking to overturn his death sentence and a new trial for his case.

On January 11, 2019, the Alabama Court of Criminal Appeals dismissed Petersen's appeal against his death sentence and murder conviction.

On November 1, 2022, Petersen filed a Rule 32 petition against his capital murder conviction. The prosecution opposed to Petersen's request for a new trial in August 2023.

In December 2025, the Rule 32 petition of Petersen was forwarded to the Houston County Circuit Court for further hearing. The defence submitted that the lack of female members in the jury led to the death sentence of Petersen, and the juror selection was likely tainted, and hence Petersen's death sentence should be reviewed.

In the end, Houston County Circuit Judge Todd Derrick denied Petersen's plea for a re-trial. On October 17, 2026, the Alabama Court of Criminal Appeals similarly refused Petersen's appeal and upheld Judge Derrick's ruling.

== Aftermath ==
The Wicksburg nightclub shooting was still remembered as one of the high-profile mass shootings to occur in Houston County itself. On August 9, 2013, the first anniversary of the shooting, the families of the deceased victims gathered to commemorate and celebrate the lives of the victims. The incident was recalled and commemorated in 2019 and 2025.

The nightclub where the shooting took place was eventually closed sometime after 2021, partly due to more violent incidents occurring at the location in the aftermath of the shooting, including a 2021 mass shooting that led to the death of one victim and another three people injured. Subsequently, a bar and grill restaurant was opened in the area, and the owner applied twice for a liquor license, but both applications were rejected by the Houston County Commissioners due to the authorities' concern over the past violent incidents and also the shooting. The restaurant was eventually rebranded as a pizza parlour, and the owner's third application for a liquor license was finally approved in October 2023.

The capital murder trial of Ryan Petersen was noted to be the longest criminal trial conducted in Houston County, having spanned for several weeks before his death sentence. Brad Mendheim, the judge who sentenced Petersen to death, was eventually promoted as a judge in the Alabama Supreme Court.

== See also ==
- Capital punishment in Alabama
- List of death row inmates in the United States § Alabama
- List of mass shootings in the United States
