= Judicial override =

Legal doctrine in the United States

In the United States and other nations that use jury trials (such as Australia), a judicial override is when a judge overrules a jury's sentencing determination.

== Use in capital cases ==
Only four U.S. states have allowed judicial overrides: Alabama, Delaware, Florida, and Indiana. Indiana abolished it in 2002, Florida in 2016, and Alabama in 2017. In 2016, the Delaware Supreme Court declared the state's death penalty law unconstitutional due to the override.

Researchers who analyzed survey data from thousands of capital jurors found that "residual doubt" about the person's guilt was the most significant reason jurors voted for a life sentence instead of the death penalty. This could suggest that life-to-death overrides have a higher likelihood of resulting in a wrongful conviction.

=== Florida ===
Florida was the first state to adopt an override statute in the 1970s, after the Supreme Court case Furman v. Georgia had effectively invalidated all death penalty statutes in the country. The purpose of the override was to prevent juries from over-sentencing the death penalty. In Tedder v. State (1975), the Supreme Court of Florida stated that for a judge to override a jury's recommendation of a life sentence, "the facts suggesting a sentence of death should be so clear and convincing that virtually no reasonable person could differ." The U.S. Supreme Court upheld Florida's statute in 1984. The last death sentence imposed by override in the state was in 1999.

In January 2016, the U.S. Supreme Court struck down a part of Florida's capital sentencing scheme in Hurst v. Florida. The Court held that "The Sixth Amendment requires a jury, not a judge, to find each fact necessary to impose a sentence of death. A jury's mere recommendation is not enough." In March 2016, the state legislature abolished the judicial override.

One notable case was Edward J. Zakrzewski II, a United States Air Force technical sergeant who killed his South Korean wife and their two children in 1994. Zakrzewski was found guilty of three counts of first-degree murder, and based on the jury's decision, he was sentenced to death for murdering both his son and wife, while he was given life imprisonment for killing his daughter Anna Zakrzewski. However, on April 19, 1996, Circuit Judge G. Robert Barron overrode the jury's recommendation and imposed a third death sentence for Anna’s murder. Barron argued Anna’s death was especially horrific, as she likely endured the terror of witnessing her brother's death and facing her own at the hands of her father. Zakrzewski was executed by lethal injection on July 31, 2025, 31 years after the murders.

In another case, Robert DuBoise was sentenced to death in March 1985 for the 1983 rape-murder of Barbara Grams even though the jury unanimously voted for life imprisonment. DuBoise's sentence was later commuted to life in prison after his appeal, and he was exonerated in 2020 after he served 37 years behind bars, due to post-conviction DNA testing results proved that DuBoise was not the killer. Amos Robinson and Abron Scott were identified in 2022 as the perpetrators after the DNA tests connected the pair to the crime.

In another notable case, Ernest Dobbert was found guilty of torturing and murdering his daughter and son, and the jury recommended life imprisonment instead of the death penalty by a 10–2 vote. However, Circuit Judge Hudson Olliff overrode the jury's recommendation of life imprisonment and sentenced Dobbert to death by electrocution, and he remarked that the nature of the crime was especially heinous, atrocious and cruel, much more than any other past cases he presided over. Dobbert was executed in the electric chair on September 7, 1984.

In October 1994, Pablo San Martin, who was one of five men charged and convicted of the 1992 murder of North Miami police officer Steven Bauer, was sentenced to death by Judge Rodolfo Sorondo, who overrode the jury's majority vote for life in prison. In his verdict, Judge Sorondo stated that life imprisonment was manifestly inadequate in view of the circumstances, and also pointed out that San Martin was involved in another murder and received a separate death sentence. In that second case, San Martin was sentenced to death in November 1993 for the 1991 murder of Raul Lopez. Ultimately, in 1998, San Martin's death sentence for the murder of Sergeant Bauer was commuted to life in prison without the possibility of parole, after the Florida Supreme Court ruled that the judge erred in deviating from the jury's vote and there were insufficient grounds to justify the override. However, as of 2026, San Martin still remains on death row for the other murder of Lopez

Ronald Alan Knight, who killed two gay men in separate cases in 1993 and 1995, was convicted of murdering his second victim, Brendan Meehan, after luring him from a gay bar in 1995. Although the jury unanimously recommended the death penalty in November 1995, Senior Judge Edward Rodgers overrode the jury's decision and sentenced him to life without parole, after he expressed concern that the jury had not taken adequate time to weigh the aggravating and mitigating factors before reaching its verdict, and he also noted that Knight's co-defendant in the Meehan case received ten years' imprisonment after taking a plea deal. Despite escaping the death penalty for Meehan's murder, Knight was sentenced to death after he was convicted of killing his first victim, Richard Kunkel, in a second murder trial in 1998.

=== Indiana ===
Indiana followed Florida in 1977 and enacted a similar death penalty scheme in which the jury's sentence recommendation was not binding. There were no directions on when the judge could override the jury's life sentence until 1989, when the Indiana Supreme Court held that the override was permitted only when "virtually no reasonable person could disagree that death was appropriate". All ten death sentences imposed by override in Indiana were later vacated in appellate courts. In 2002, the override was abolished, and the courts were left with an option to determine the sentence only when the jury's recommendation was not unanimous.

=== Alabama ===
In Alabama, judges had no restrictions on when they could override a jury's recommendation of a life sentence. Judicial overrides amounted to almost one quarter (24.5%) of all death sentences between 1981 and 2015 (101 out of 413), and half of exonerations due to innocence (3 out of 6).

In 1995, the United States Supreme Court held in an 8–1 decision that the Eighth Amendment "does not require the State to define the weight the sentencing judge must give to an advisory jury verdict". The Court had been asked to impose Florida's "great weight" standard on Alabama, but Associate Justice Sandra Day O'Connor said that doing so would amount to micromanagement. The Supreme Court declined to take up a case reviewing Alabama's use of judicial overrides in 2013 and again in 2015. Justices Stephen Breyer and Sonia Sotomayor dissented in the 2013 decision to decline to rehear the issue. Justice Sotomayor suggested that the elected nature of Alabama's judges is the underlying issue, with a study showing that death sentences are imposed more in election years.

In April 2017, the Alabama legislature passed a bill that abolished judicial override prospectively. The law, however, was not retroactive and the offenders sentenced to death via judicial override before 2017 remained on death row. Later, a subsequent bill was petitioned to allow the law become retroactive and approve the re-sentencing of condemned killers affected by judicial override. This bill was, however, rejected by the state lawmakers. A report in May 2024 revealed that 30 of these prisoners still remained on death row.

Notable cases of people sentenced to death via judicial override include Thomas Dale Ferguson, who murdered a father-son pair in 1997; Oscar Roy Doster, who killed a man during a prison break; and Kenneth Eugene Smith, who was convicted of the 1988 contract killing of a woman; Westley Devon Harris, who murdered six members of his ex-girlfriend's family; Christie Michelle Scott, who was convicted of the 2008 arson-murder of her autistic son; and Jeffery Lee, who shot and killed American singer Jimmy Ellis and his ex-wife Elaine Thompson.

However, there were cases where judges would still sentence a defendant to life imprisonment even when the jury recommended the death penalty. In the case of Eddie Bernard Neal, who was one of three men convicted of the 1976 murder of Quenette Shehane, Circuit Judge Charles Nice overrode the jury's vote for death and imposed life imprisonment without parole instead.

=== Delaware ===
Delaware enacted an override statute in November 1991 after a jury had given four perpetrators life sentences for murdering two guards during an armed robbery. The life-to-death override was used on only one defendant, whose sentence was appealed and ultimately changed to a life verdict. Instead, the override was used multiple times to override a death sentence recommended by the jury.

In August 2016, the Delaware Supreme Court held that the judicial override made the state's death penalty statute violate the Sixth Amendment of the US Constitution.

== See also ==
- Capital punishment in Alabama
- Capital punishment in Florida
- Capital punishment in Delaware
- Capital punishment in Indiana
- Judgment notwithstanding verdict
