= Thomas Whisenhant =

American serial killer executed in Alabama (1947–2010)

- Born: January 29, 1947; Prichard, Alabama, U.S.
- Died: May 27, 2010 (aged 63); Holman Correctional Facility, Alabama, U.S.
- Status: Executed by lethal injection
- Convictions: Military; Assault with intent to commit murder Alabama; Capital murder (1 count)
- Penalty: Military; 20 years imprisonment with hard labor; commuted to 10 years imprisonment with hard labor Alabama; Death (September 7, 1977)

Details
- Victims: 4+
- Span of crimes: May 6, 1963 – October 16, 1976
- Country: United States
- State: Alabama
- Date apprehended: October 17, 1976

Thomas Warren Whisenhant (January 29, 1947 – May 27, 2010) was an American serial killer who murdered at least four women between 1963 and 1976 in Mobile County, Alabama. After being arrested for the October 1976 murder of Cheryl Payton, Whisenhant confessed to killing three other women. He was sentenced to death in Alabama in September 1977 and was executed in May 2010 at Holman Correctional Facility via lethal injection. At the time of his execution, Whisenhant was Alabama's longest serving death row inmate, spending 32 years, 8 months, and 20 days on death row.

== Early life ==
Thomas Warren Whisenhant was born on January 29, 1947, in Prichard, Alabama, the youngest of four children born to Willie and Emma Whisenhant. He came from a low-income family, which was ruled by his mother, a domineering woman who would constantly argue with and frequently attack her physically weak and alcoholic husband and who also encouraged her children to do the same. Such altercations often occurred when Whisenhant's father would get drunk on moonshine and try to seduce his wife, who would always reject him. She reserved her anger and abuse only for her husband and instead spoiled Whisenhant, of whom she was overprotective. Whisenhant was made to share a bed with his mother until the age of 7 and continued to share the same bedroom with her until the age of 16, by which time he had, according to his sister, become moody and violent. Also, by his teenage years, Whisenhant was constantly accompanied by his mother, who never let him out of her sight. According to a psychologist, Whisenhant resented her.

== Murders ==
On May 6, 1963, 72-year-old widow Lexie Haynes was fatally shot in Prichard. Police arrived at the scene and found the murder weapon in an empty lot next to Whisenhant's family home. Whisenhant, who was 16 at the time, was immediately suspected, as he had recently been charged with robbing a blind woman. According to a retired Prichard police captain, the robbery charge against Whisenhant was later thrown out of court due to a technicality. Police questioned Whisenhant about the murder; however, his family provided him with an alibi and claimed he had been at home when the shooting occurred. Before the shooting occurred, Whisenhant and his friends had been playing with a stolen handgun. A witness later said Whisenhant had taken a bullet from the revolver, held it up, and stated it would soon kill somebody. Police later revealed that Haynes had spoken with Whisenhant about this behavior, which was why they suspected he killed her. However, for unknown reasons, Whisenhant was never brought to trial for the murder of Haynes.

Following the shooting, Whisenhant joined the United States Air Force as an airman. He was stationed at Ent Air Force Base near Colorado Springs, Colorado. On October 25, 1965, Whisenhant attacked 22-year-old Rose Covington, a United States Air Force WAF. He beat her unconscious with a metal ashtray in the finance office of Ent Air Force Base. Covington suffered severe head and facial injuries and was hospitalized for two months. At Whisenhant's trial, she testified she had never met him and did not even know what he looked like. An FBI laboratory expert testified that shoe prints left at the crime scene matched Whisenhant's. Whisenhant continued to deny the attack but was ultimately convicted of assault with intent to murder on March 14, 1966, and sentenced to 20 years in prison with hard labor. He was also reduced in rank, ordered to forfeit all pay, and dishonorably discharged from the Air Force. Whisenhant initially served his sentence at Fort Carson before being transferred to an undisclosed federal prison to serve the remainder of his sentence. In 1970, Whisenhant's sentence was reduced to ten years, and on November 28, 1973, he was granted parole.

On November 21, 1975, Whisenhant attacked 28-year-old Patricia Hitt, a mother of two who worked in a convenience store in Mobile County, Alabama. Whisenhant approached her, beat her, and then fatally shot her in the head. Initially, two other men were arrested for the crime.

On April 16, 1976, Whisenhant kidnapped and murdered another female convenience store clerk in Mobile, 44-year-old Venora Hyatt. Whisenhant kidnapped Hyatt from the convenience store and took her to an old house that was covered with kudzu vines. Whisenhant murdered Hyatt and dumped her body near an abandoned shack in Mobile. The following day, he returned to the crime scene and mutilated Hyatt's body. He then took Hyatt's wristwatch, which he later gave to his wife as a present.

On October 16, 1976, Whisenhant abducted 23-year-old Cheryl Lynn Payton, a convenience store clerk who worked at a ComPac Store in Mobile County. Whisenhant kidnapped her at gunpoint and drove her to a remote wooded area, where he raped her in the front seat of his pickup truck. He then killed her by fatally shooting her in the head with a .32 caliber pistol. He dragged her body into the nearby woods before fleeing.

== Capture and trials ==
On October 17, Whisenhant returned to the crime scene and mutilated Payton's body. He cut off a large part of her breast and slashed her abdomen. However, he was spotted near the crime scene, and after a chase, was captured by police. During his interrogation, he gave a detailed confession to all of his crimes. Not only did he confess to murdering Payton and mutilating her body, but he also admitted to murdering both Hitt and Hyatt in the months prior. He later admitted to murdering Haynes during his teenage years. Whisenhant also confessed to the assault on Covington and attacking two other women, including his wife. He did claim, however, that the only victim he raped was Payton.

Whisenhant's killings generated attention and publicity in the Mobile area. As such, his trial was moved to Birmingham. On August 1, 1977, his trial for the murder of Payton began. Whisenhant pleaded not guilty by reason of insanity. On August 9, the jury found Whisenhant guilty of capital murder. On September 7, he was sentenced to death.

In September 1977, Verona Hyatt's son, 26-year-old Kenneth Lynn Curry, kidnapped and robbed a taxi driver. He later claimed he committed the crime so he could go to prison and avenge his mother's death by killing Whisenhant.

Whisenhant's original conviction was later reversed by the Alabama Court of Criminal Appeals, resulting in him being retried. In 1981, he was retried and convicted once again. The conviction was upheld; however, his death sentence was overturned due to a remark made by the prosecutor during the sentencing phase of his trial. A new hearing was held, and in 1987, Whisenhant was sentenced to death again.

== Execution ==
Whisenhant avoided execution for more than three decades due to successful appeals and prosecutorial error. In November 2009, Assistant Attorney General Clay Crenshaw filed a motion asking the Supreme Court of Alabama to set an execution date for Whisenhant. He was scheduled for execution on May 27, 2010.

On May 27, 2010, Whisenhant was executed via lethal injection at Holman Correctional Facility near Atmore, Alabama. His last meal consisted of chicken leg quarters, French fries, American cheese, orange drink, coffee, and chocolate pudding. He declined to make a final statement. Whisenhant spent 32 years, 8 months, and 20 days on death row, which at the time was longer than any other prisoner had ever spent on death row in Alabama.

== See also ==
- Capital punishment in Alabama
- List of longest prison sentences served
- List of people executed in Alabama
- List of people executed in the United States in 2010
- List of serial killers in the United States
