= Cane Creek Canyon Nature Preserve =

Private nature preserve in Alabama, US

Cane Creek is a small, rural fishing and camping area with a small boat ramp, where the creek meets the Tennessee River in Colbert County, Alabama, west of Tuscumbia, just below TVA Colbert Steam plant

Cane Creek Boat Ramp is a public Cane Creek Boat Ramp water access point located in Cherokee, Alabama (Colbert County), operated by the AL-DCNR Freshwater Boat Ramps Division.
