= Demetrius Terrence Frazier =

American serial rapist and convicted murderer executed in Alabama (1972–2025)

- ADOC mugshot
- Born: October 29, 1972; Michigan, U.S.
- Died: February 6, 2025 (aged 52); Holman Correctional Facility, Alabama, U.S.
- Status: Executed by nitrogen hypoxia
- Convictions: Alabama; Capital murder Michigan; First-degree murder Armed robbery Felony firearms possession First-degree criminal sexual misconduct (×2)
- Penalty: Alabama; Death; Michigan; Life imprisonment without the possibility of parole (×4) plus 60 to 90 years in prison

Details
- Victims: Murdered; Pauline Starks Brown, 40; Crystal Kendrick, 14; Alive; Eight other rape victims Several robbery victims
- Date: 1991–1992
- Locations: Alabama, Michigan
- Imprisoned at: Alger Correctional Facility (Michigan; 1993–2011); Holman Correctional Facility (Alabama; 2011–2025)

Demetrius Terrence Frazier (October 29, 1972 – February 6, 2025) was an American serial rapist and convicted murderer executed in Alabama for the 1991 rape and murder of 40-year-old Pauline Brown, after a robbery on November 27, 1991. Frazier confessed to Brown's murder after his arrest in Detroit, Michigan, for the 1992 murder of 14-year-old Crystal Kendrick in Michigan, whom he had shot to death while attempting to rape the girl. Besides his two murder convictions, Frazier was suspected of raping eight other women in Michigan; and was tried and found guilty of two of those rapes by a Wayne County jury.

For the murder of Brown, Frazier was convicted of capital murder and sentenced to death in Alabama in 1996. He was also given multiple life sentences in 1993 for the murder of Kendrick and other offences he committed in Michigan; he spent over 18 years at the Alger Correctional Facility in Michigan until 2011, when he was transferred to the Holman Correctional Facility in Alabama, home to the state's death row.

Frazier was executed by nitrogen hypoxia on February 6, 2025, after being imprisoned for over 32 years.

== Early life ==
Demetrius Terrence Frazier was born in Michigan on October 29, 1972.

Frazier, who had one sister, was raised by his mother Carol, but he was neglected as a child. He was also in custody of social services at one point. As a child, Frazier would often sneak out of his house to commit petty offences. Frazier dropped out of high school at a young age.

As a juvenile, Frazier was dealt with by the law for carrying concealed weapons and also violated his probation for both carrying concealed weapons and breaking and entering. At one point, Frazier was detained at the W.J Maxey Boys Training School, a juvenile correctional facility in Michigan for adolescents and young adults aged between 12 and 21; Frazier obtained a GED during his stay at the detention center.

== Murders ==
Between 1991 and 1992, Demetrius Terrence Frazier, then 19 years old, had committed two murders in Michigan and Alabama respectively.

=== Pauline Brown ===
On November 27, 1991, in Birmingham, Alabama, Frazier passed by one of the ground floor apartments in the area when he noticed that the apartment itself had a light on, and therefore formulated an intention to commit robbery. Frazier removed the screen from the window and entered through the window. Frazier searched around the apartment and found some money, amounting to $5 or $10 in cash. He then went to another room, where he found 40-year-old Pauline Starks Brown asleep.

After waking her up, Frazier demanded more money, and she gave him $80 out of her purse. Frazier then threatened her with a gun, and forced her to have sexual intercourse with him. Brown begged for her life and Frazier fired a shot in the back of her head and left the apartment briefly to check if anyone had heard it. When Frazier returned, he found that Brown had died. Frazier searched the apartment for more money, ate some food, and left the apartment, and he also disposed of the gun.

The body of Brown was eventually found by Tyrone Mitchell, who was a co-worker and friend of Brown. Mitchell arrived at the home of Brown after the latter, who was supposed to give him a ride to their workplace to attend their work shift, did not show up for work and he showed concern over her absence. Mitchell and two maintenance men managed to open the window into Brown's apartment, and it led to the discovery of Brown's body, which was lying face down inside the bedroom. At the time of her death, Brown was survived by her two daughters and one grandchild (who was born a few weeks prior to Brown's death).

=== Crystal Kendrick ===
On March 8, 1992, in Detroit, Michigan, Frazier murdered a young girl in midst of a rape attempt.

On that date, Frazier confined a 14-year-old runaway girl, Crystal Kendrick, inside an abandoned house, and during the attempt to rape Kendrick, Frazier shot Kendrick to death while she tried to flee from the house. Kendrick's body was found with a bullet wound in her head. According to her friends and guardian, Kendrick was originally a well-behaved girl before her mother abandoned her, in combination with her mother's drug addiction and Kendrick gradually having gone astray without the supervision of her mother and relatives. Kendrick's guardians reportedly expressed guilt and sadness for not being able to take better care of Kendrick.

Frazier was subsequently named a suspect behind Kendrick's murder, and he was therefore listed on the wanted list for the offence. Frazier remained on the run for murdering the girl before his arrest during the same month he killed his second victim. Upon his arrest, Frazier confessed to killing Brown while in police custody in Michigan.

== Murder trials in Alabama and Michigan ==
Between 1993 and 1996, Demetrius Frazier was tried in both Michigan and Alabama for the murders he committed there.

=== Michigan ===
On July 9, 1992, Frazier was charged with first-degree murder for the fatal shooting of Crystal Kendrick. He was also charged with raping eight other women.

Prior to his trial for murdering Kendrick, Frazier and his lawyers attempted to have his confession to Kendrick's killing ruled inadmissible. Frazier submitted that he fell in love with Detroit homicide detective Monica Childs, who was in charge of the case, and he was thus tricked into confessing to both the murders of Kendrick and Pauline Brown. According to Frazier's counsel, Childs allegedly offered Frazier a promise that he would not be sent back to Alabama to stand trial for Brown's murder, given that Michigan did not have the death penalty while Alabama still allowed the death penalty for murder offences. However, the confession was ultimately ruled admissible in court after the courts rejected Frazier's allegations. Frazier also reportedly punched a prosecutor in court during his pre-trial hearing.

On April 8, 1993, a Michigan trial court found Frazier guilty of felony murder and felony firearms possession in the case of Crystal Kendrick's death. Frazier was sentenced to double terms of life imprisonment for both counts.

In addition to the charges he faced for Kendrick's death, Frazier was also tried in Michigan for other rape and robbery cases he committed prior to the murder of Kendrick, mainly one case of armed robbery and two cases of rape committed on September 1, 1991. Frazier was handed another two life sentences, plus 60 to 90 years' jail for these cases on October 20, 1993.

=== Alabama ===
In Alabama, Frazier was indicted by a Jefferson County jury in November 1993 on charges of capital murder for the death of Brown. Unlike Michigan, which was a non-death penalty state, the death penalty was legalized in Alabama as a potential punishment for capital murder.

On June 5, 1996, Frazier was found guilty of one count of capital murder under the circumstances of robbery and one lesser charge of murder in the course of rape. Before the jury's verdict was delivered, Frazier reportedly lashed out at the jury, a majority of which consisted of white jurors, for being allegedly racist towards him and even threw a pen at them.

Two days later, during a sentencing hearing on June 7, 1996, the jury recommended the death penalty by a vote of 10–2 for the charge of capital murder. Brown's brother, Curtis Starks, stated that the family were relieved to see Frazier convicted of his sister's murder, and said that Frazier deserved the death penalty for being a serial rapist who killed people that made him mad and he did not deserve to be free.

On August 8, 1996, for the offence of capital murder, Frazier was sentenced to death by Circuit Court Judge Hon. Mike McCormick during a formal court hearing. Frazier was also sentenced to life imprisonment for the lesser offence of murder in the course of rape.

== Appeals and incarceration ==
From 1993 to 2011, Demetrius Frazier served his life sentence at the Alger Maximum Correctional Facility under the supervision of the Michigan Department of Corrections. He was eventually transferred to the Holman Correctional Facility in Alabama, where he was held on death row since 2011.

During the time of his imprisonment in both Michigan and Alabama, Frazier appealed against his death sentence for the murder of Pauline Brown in Alabama. On January 10, 1999, the Alabama Court of Criminal Appeals dismissed Frazier's appeal against his death sentence.

On December 30, 1999, the Alabama Supreme Court confirmed the death penalty for Frazier and rejected his follow-up appeal against the judgement of the Alabama Court of Criminal Appeals.

On February 28, 2003, Frazier's second appeal to the Alabama Court of Criminal Appeals was dismissed.

On October 25, 2011, the 11th Circuit Court of Appeals turned down Frazier's appeal. A short time after that, Frazier was extradited to Alabama to serve his death sentence at the Holman Correctional Facility, which also houses the execution chamber in Alabama.

On October 1, 2012, the United States Supreme Court denied Frazier relief; fully exhausting Frazier's regular appeals.

In September 2014, the Alabama attorney general's office filed a motion with the Alabama Supreme Court to schedule the execution dates of nine death row inmates in Alabama, including Frazier, after they managed to amend the laws to approve a new lethal injection protocol.

Frazier was one of the several death row prisoners from Alabama who launched a lawsuit against the state's execution protocols and the use of lethal injection, which was Alabama's primary method of execution. The federal lawsuit was heard in 2015 and 2016 respectively. Frazier and another convicted killer, Tommy Arthur, suggested that their executions should be carried out by either hanging or firing squad, which were not accepted by a federal judge. Arthur himself was eventually executed in 2017 for the 1982 contract killing of Troy Wicker. In 2015, Frazier was one of five death row prisoners who filed a lawsuit opposing the state authorities' bid to administer large doses of midazolam in lethal injection executions.

Subsequently, by 2018, the lawmakers of Alabama managed to legalize executions by nitrogen hypoxia as an alternative method of execution in the state. Frazier was one of the condemned inmates who chose to be executed by nitrogen gas inhalation.

On October 9, 2019, the U.S. Supreme Court again dismissed Frazier's appeal against his death sentence. Frazier was one of the six condemned inmates from Alabama who had lost their last appeals to the U.S. Supreme Court on that same date.

== Execution order and final appeals ==
=== Death warrant ===
On October 19, 2024, a request for Frazier's death warrant to be issued was made, and on January 7, 2025, Alabama governor Kay Ivey scheduled Demetrius Frazier's execution date as February 6, 2025, following an order from the Alabama Supreme Court authorizing the governor to set the date.

Frazier was set to be the fourth person on Alabama's death row to be executed by nitrogen gas inhalation, after Alabama conducted its first three nitrogen gas executions in 2024: Kenneth Eugene Smith in January, Alan Eugene Miller in September and Carey Dale Grayson in November. A 30-hour window frame for the execution to be carried out was set from 12am on February 6 to 6am on February 7, 2025.

=== Appeal against execution method ===
While awaiting his execution in February 2025, Frazier filed a federal appeal to bar the state from carrying out his execution by nitrogen hypoxia until the state agreed to his request to amend certain parts of the protocol to facilitate his nitrogen gas execution. Frazier's lawyers argued that the prior three executions showed that the nitrogen gas executions did not guarantee an immediate loss of consciousness before death and a painless death, given that there were witness accounts of the three offenders having experienced conscious suffocation, convulsions and sudden involuntary movements on the gurney. However, the state officials refuted Frazier's claims and stated that the nitrogen gas executions did not have any major problems per Frazier's arguments. U.S. District Judge Emily C. Marks was chaired to hear a federal appeal against the nitrogen gas execution.

On January 31, 2025, Marks rejected Frazier's appeal to either stop the execution or allow Frazier's request to take a sedative before his nitrogen gas execution.

=== Appeal to transfer Frazier back to Michigan ===
Apart from this, Frazier's lawyers also sought to argue in another appeal that Frazier should not be in the judicial custody of Alabama but of Michigan, since he was still listed as an inmate under the Michigan penitentiary system, and stated that the agreement between the governors of Michigan and Alabama – Rick Snyder (Michigan) and Robert J. Bentley (Alabama) – to transfer Frazier from Michigan to Alabama to serve his death sentence was "unlawful and void". One of Frazier's lawyers also urged the incumbent Michigan governor Gretchen Whitmer to have Frazier sent back to Michigan, where capital punishment was abolished in 1846.

However, the legal representatives of the Michigan Department of Corrections expressed that they did not wish to seek the return of Frazier to a Michigan prison. They also criticized Frazier for filing such a claim merely weeks before his execution when his transfer took place for more than a decade ago, and described it as a "farfetched argument". Similarly, the representatives of the Alabama Attorney-General's Office also argued that the appeal should be rejected and called it an attempt by Frazier to stall his upcoming execution. On top of that, a spokesperson for the governor of Michigan also announced that Whitmer would not ask for Frazier to return to Michigan at this point in time. In the end, Frazier's lawyers withdrew their appeal for Frazier to return to Michigan to continue his life sentences. They also made a statement, claiming that Michigan would witness its first case of having a prisoner under the judicial custody of Michigan executed in another state (Alabama). In an update of the case, Michigan Attorney General Dana Nessel reiterated that Michigan would not negotiate for Frazier to return to Michigan and not oppose the execution of Frazier.

Carol Frazier, Frazier's mother, publicly appealed to the Michigan governor for her son to return to Michigan to continue serving the rest of his life sentences for the murder of Kendrick. She stated that her son was a changed man and wanted him to spend the rest of his life in a Michigan prison but not be put to death in an Alabama prison. Death penalty opponents advocated against the upcoming execution of Frazier, acknowledging that his crimes were especially heinous and inhumane but stated that his execution was inappropriate on philosophical and legal grounds.

On January 31, 2025, Frazier's lawyers again urged Whitmer to have Frazier sent back to Michigan to continue serving his life sentence. They argued that in another case, convicted killer Clarence Ray Jr. was sentenced to death in another murder trial in California after being sentenced to life without parole by Michigan for first-degree murder, but he was not sent back to California to face execution for another murder, and the District Attorney of Michigan at that time stated that as long as the sentences in Michigan were not completed, any Michigan inmates facing capital punishment in another state would not be brought back to the state in question to face his/her execution. The lawyers argued that the Clarence Ray case contradicted to the extradition agreement of Frazier, whose situation was similar to Ray's but had different outcomes, and therefore asked Whitmer to exercise her authority to enable Frazier to return to Michigan.

In the end, Whitmer declined to intervene on Frazier's extradition. She acknowledged that the decision by her predecessor to send Frazier to Alabama was "unfortunate" but she could not act on it as it was up to the Alabama Governor Kay Ivey to decide what to do.

=== Response of victims' families ===
In response to the upcoming execution of his aunt's killer, Pauline Brown's nephew Curtis Starks Jr., who was in high school when the killing occurred, stated that his aunt was an integral part of the close-knit family and her death was a terrible loss, and found it the most devastating thing that Brown was murdered just because she was pleading for her life. Starks described his aunt as a good cook, stating that she made the best red velvet cake he had ever eaten, although Starks admitted he could not bring himself to eat the cake until many years later due to his aunt's death. Starks also confirmed he would attend the execution of Frazier, and it was also reported that his father, grandmother and one of Brown's daughters had died prior to the scheduled execution of Frazier.

== Execution ==
On February 6, 2025, 52-year-old Demetrius Terrence Frazier was put to death by nitrogen hypoxia in the Holman Correctional Facility. About 26 minutes after the execution procedure commenced, Frazier was pronounced dead at 6:36 pm. Frazier was said to have made a few gasping breaths at first before it transitioned to a series of sporadic breaths, and he ceased all movements at 6:21 pm. Alabama Corrections commissioner John Hamm confirmed that Frazier no longer had any heartbeat 13 minutes after the gas was first released.

In his final statement, Frazier apologized to the surviving friends and family members of Brown, and in turn, the African-American community, stating that the death of Brown should not have happened. Frazier also suggested that the media should contact a former detective from Michigan, claiming he made a false confession about the murder of Crystal Kendrick. His last two words were, "Let's go."

Frazier's final meal consisted of a meal from Taco Bell: a beefy five-layer burrito, a chicken chalupa supreme, beef crunchy tacos, chips and dip, and a Mountain Dew. Frazier also received a final visit from his mother, sister, and counsel before the death sentence was carried out. Frazier was the fourth condemned inmate in Alabama to undergo a nitrogen gas execution since 2024. Frazier was also the first person executed in Alabama in 2025, as well as the third execution to happen in the U.S. that same year.

After the execution of Frazier, Governor Kay Ivey released a statement, affirming Alabama's stance to enforce the law and pursuit for justice, stating that everyone should abide by the laws of Alabama and expect to face consequences for breaking it without exception, and proclaimed that rapists and killers were not welcome in society. She added that justice was served with the conclusion of Frazier's case and execution, and offered her condolences to Brown's family.

Similarly, Alabama attorney general Steve Marshall condemned Frazier as a monster who killed two innocent people and "left a trail of unspeakable violence", and stated that he was "fairly and appropriately punished" for the crimes he committed in Alabama, and offered condolences to the surviving family members of Brown.

On the other hand, Frazier's lawyers criticised the execution, stating that they were disappointed with Michigan for not stepping in to stop the execution of one of their residents (given the state's abolition of capital punishment) and they also criticised the decision of Ivey to not grant clemency to Frazier.

== See also ==
- Capital punishment in Alabama
- List of people executed in Alabama
- List of people executed in the United States in 2025
- List of people sentenced to more than one life imprisonment

Executions by nitrogen hypoxia in the United States
Preceded by Carey Dale Grayson – Alabama November 21, 2024	Demetrius Frazier – Alabama; February 6, 2025	Succeeded by Jessie Hoffman Jr. – Louisiana March 18, 2025
Executions carried out in Alabama
Preceded by Carey Dale Grayson November 21, 2024	Demetrius Terrence Frazier; February 6, 2025	Succeeded by James Lee Osgood April 24, 2025
Executions carried out in the United States
Preceded by Steven Lawayne Nelson – Texas February 5, 2025	Demetrius Terrence Frazier – Alabama; February 6, 2025	Succeeded by James Dennis Ford – Florida February 13, 2025
