= Murder of Gregory Huguley =

1993 murder and kidnapping of a man in Talladega, Alabama

- Location: Talladega County, Alabama, United States
- Date: July 31, 1993
- Attack type: Murder by burning Kidnapping
- Weapon: Gun
- Victim: Gregory Huguley
- Verdict: Guilty
- Convictions: Boyd, Ingram and Ackles; Capital murder Cox; Murder
- Sentence: Boyd and Ingram; Death; Ackles; Life without parole Cox; Life with parole
- Convicted: Quintay Cox; Marcel Ackles; Shawn Ingram; Anthony Boyd

On July 31, 1993, in Talladega County, Alabama, 32-year-old Gregory Huguley was kidnapped at gunpoint by a group of four men, primarily due to a $200 cocaine debt. Huguley was doused in petrol by his attackers, who set him on fire and therefore murdered him by burning him alive. The group was later arrested and charged with the abduction and murder of Huguley.

Of all the four perpetrators, Quintay Cox and Marcel Ackles were both sentenced to life in prison for murder and capital murder respectively, while the remaining two men, Shawn Ingram (born March 8, 1971) and Anthony Boyd (September 5, 1971 – October 23, 2025), were both sentenced to death for capital murder. Boyd remained on death row for 30 years until he was executed on October 23, 2025, by nitrogen hypoxia. Boyd's conviction and execution was controversial due to the implications of execution by nitrogen gas and both the conflicting testimonies and lack of physical evidence surrounding his trial and conviction. Ingram remains on death row as of 2026.

== Murder ==
On July 31, 1993, three men – Anthony Todd Boyd, Moneek Marcell Ackles (better known as Marcel Ackles) and Robert Shawn Ingram (better known as Shawn Ingram) – were searching for 32-year-old Gregory "New York" Huguley, who bought cocaine from them a few days earlier but did not pay the $200 to the trio. They were later joined by a fourth man, Dwinaune Quintay Cox (better known as Quintay Cox), who armed himself with a 9-millimeter MAC 11 automatic pistol. The search lasted until evening, before they located Huguley at Anniston, Alabama.

After they found Huguley, the four men kidnapped him at gunpoint, and forced him into Ackles's rented blue van. They later drove to a gas station, where they bought a plastic container of gasoline before they continued their journey, and reached a baseball field in North Talladega County. Huguley was ordered by his captors to lie down on a bench, and afterwards, Boyd proceeded to tape the feet of Huguley with duct tape, while Ackles taped Huguley's mouth and hands, before he was taped to the bench by the men.

Subsequently, Ingram poured the gasoline on Huguley's body and also made a two-foot trail of gasoline, before he started a fire, which spread towards Huguley and he was engulfed in flames. Huguley was burned to death as a result, and the fire lasted for ten to 15 minutes until the flames died out, and the four men stood by and watched throughout. The body of Huguley was discovered the next day on August 1, 1993, and the body could not be identified at first since it was badly burnt. Later, the forensic pathologist cut off a hand during the autopsy to extract fingerprints, which were matched to Huguley and confirmed his identity.

== Trials ==
=== Charges and pre-trial ===
The following month after the murder of Gregory Huguley, the police managed to arrest all the four perpetrators behind his death, and they were all charged with the killing. In June 1994, a Talladega County grand jury formally indicted the four men for the kidnapping and murder of Huguley. For the most serious charges of capital murder, the men would face the death penalty if found guilty under Alabama state law.

Prior to their trials, two of the men, Anthony Boyd and Shawn Ingram, were each offered plea agreements in exchange for testifying against their codefendants. Under the proposed agreements, the death penalty would have been taken off the table, with Boyd receiving life imprisonment without parole and Ingram receiving life imprisonment with the possibility of parole. Boyd rejected the offer, maintaining that he was innocent, while Ingram initially accepted the agreement but later withdrew and proceeded to trial.

In the end, one of the four men, Quintay Cox, agreed to become the prosecution's key witness and testify against his three accomplices, and in exchange, Cox would instead plead guilty to a lesser charge of murder and avoid the death penalty for his involvement in Huguley's death.

=== Convictions and sentences ===
Boyd was the first suspect to be found guilty of capital murder by a Talladega County jury, and on March 16, 1995, ten out of 12 jurors voted for the death sentence. On May 19, 1995, Boyd was officially sentenced to death in the electric chair by Circuit Judge Jerry Fielding. During Boyd's trial, Cox showed up as a key prosecution witness and testified that Boyd helped taped the feet of Huguley to the bench while Ackles also taped the hands and mouth of the victim, who was later doused in gasoline and set on fire by Ingram. Cox initially tried to back out of his agreement and refused to testify, before he changed his mind.

Ingram became the second defendant to be found guilty of the capital murder of Huguley, and on May 18, 1995, the jury recommended the death penalty based on a 11–1 vote. Circuit Judge Jerry Fielding likewise adhered to the jury's vote and formally sentenced Ingram to death by electrocution on June 16, 1995.

Marcel Ackles was the third of the four men to be convicted of capital murder in August 1995. Like the other defendants, Cox testified against Ackles during his trial. Cox was the fourth and final perpetrator to be convicted, pleading guilty to the lesser charge of murder on September 4, 1995. As part of the plea agreement, Circuit Judge Jerry Fielding sentenced Cox to life imprisonment with the possibility of parole that same day. Ackles, however, received a harsher sentence, being sentenced on the same date to life without parole.

For the next 14 years, Cox remained in prison until he was granted parole and released in 2009.

Ackles, who claimed during a 2025 interview that he was innocent and never killed Huguley, remains incarcerated at the William E. Donaldson Correctional Facility as of 2026.

== Appeal process ==
=== Boyd ===
On January 18, 1997, the Alabama Court of Criminal Appeals denied Anthony Boyd's direct appeal against his death sentence and capital murder conviction.

On November 2, 1998, Boyd's appeal against his conviction and sentence was turned down by the U.S. Supreme Court.

On September 27, 2003, the Alabama Court of Criminal Appeals rejected Boyd's second appeal against her death sentence.

On June 24, 2013, the U.S. Supreme Court denied Boyd's final petition for a writ of certiorari.

Two years after he exhausted his appeals, Boyd and another death row prisoner, Tommy Arthur, filed an appeal seeking to have their sentences carried out by either hanging or firing squad, which were methods not legally authorized for capital punishment in Alabama. On October 8, 2015, a federal judge denied their petitions.

On May 10, 2017, the 11th U.S. Circuit Court of Appeals rejected Boyd's appeal to face either the gallows or the firing squad, because the state of Alabama had only the methods of lethal injection and electric chair to carry out death sentences.

On March 19, 2018, the U.S. Supreme Court once again dismissed Boyd's application for a writ of certiorari.

=== Ingram ===
On August 27, 1999, the Alabama Court of Criminal Appeals upheld the death sentence of Shawn Ingram and refused his first appeal.

On June 23, 2000, the Alabama Supreme Court denied Ingram's appeal against his capital murder conviction and death sentence.

On February 26, 2001, the U.S. Supreme Court dismissed Ingram's appeal against his death sentence.

On March 18, 2010, the Alabama Supreme Court granted Ingram's appeal and ordered a new Rule 32 hearing for Ingram to pursue post-conviction relief.

On October 18, 2012, Ingram's appeal was rejected by an appellate court.

In March 2023, Ingram appealed to the 11th U.S. Circuit Court of Appeals and sought a new sentencing hearing. In September 2023, the court turned down the appeal.

On May 13, 2024, Ingram's final petition for a writ of certiorari was denied by the U.S. Supreme Court.

As of 2026, Ingram remains incarcerated on death row at the Holman Correctional Facility. His date of execution was not yet scheduled.

== Anthony Boyd's execution ==
Throughout his 30 years on death row at the Holman Correctional Facility, Anthony Boyd stated from time to time that he was innocent and did not kill Gregory Huguley, and his case gradually became controversial during the final years leading up to his execution in 2025. With respect to his conviction, there was no physical evidence to link Boyd to the crime, and it was relied on the testimony of one of his co-defendants, Quintay Cox, and a few other witnesses, but there were multiple inconsistencies in their respective accounts. Furthermore, the defence also summoned several witnesses who claimed that Boyd was attending a birthday party on the night of Huguley's murder, and he also spent the night at a hotel with his girlfriend, which further cast doubts over the validity of Boyd's conviction for murdering Huguley. As of August 2025, Boyd was also the chairman of Project Hope to Abolish the Death Penalty, an anti-death penalty organization founded by several inmates on Alabama's death row.

On August 18, 2025, Governor Kay Ivey set an execution date of October 23, 2025, for Anthony Boyd, after the Alabama Supreme Court approved his death warrant. Boyd's execution would also be carried out by nitrogen hypoxia.

Soon after he received his death warrant, Boyd filed a lawsuit to challenge the state's use of nitrogen hypoxia to carry out his death sentence on the grounds that it was unconstitutionally cruel and caused unnecessary suffering, and he wanted to be put to death by either hanging or firing squad instead. While his execution date drew nearer, Boyd continued to maintain that he was innocent and never killed Huguley. His family and supporters also ramped up efforts to seek clemency and another review of his claims of innocence, although the Alabama Attorney General Steve Marshall stated that Boyd did not submit evidence to prove that he was innocent during his 30 years of appeal and rebutted that Boyd never had any concern for the "ethics of execution" when he committed the murder of Huguley.

On October 9, 2025, two weeks before Boyd's scheduled execution, Chief U.S District Judge Emily C. Marks rejected the appeal of Boyd after she dismissed his claims that the method of nitrogen hypoxia was unconstitutionally cruel. An follow-up appeal was denied by the 11th U.S. Circuit Court of Appeals on October 20, 2025. During the final week before his execution, Boyd asked the governor to personally meet him at the prison, and stated that he was innocent and he should not be executed. However, a spokesperson for Governor Ivey stated that each individual case was reviewed thoroughly by the governor before an execution date was scheduled, and this review did not include one-on-one meetings with inmates. The spokesperson added that in view of this situation, plus the absence of any court filings regarding Boyd's claims of innocence, Boyd's request was "especially unworkable".

As a final recourse, Boyd appealed to the U.S. Supreme Court against his death sentence, and challenged the use of nitrogen gas. However, the appeal was dismissed, with six conservative justices ruling to deny the appeal while the three liberal justices – Sonia Sotomayor, Elena Kagan and Ketanji Brown Jackson – dissented. Sotomayor, who penned the dissenting judgement, stated that the method of nitrogen hypoxia did not cause the prisoner to immediately lose consciousness, and was "not at all what it was promised to be", since in the past cases, it took between at least two minutes and at most seven minutes to lose consciousness, and the suffocation during these minutes was "excruciating". Sotomayor also sharply criticized the majority for rejecting Boyd's claims, and stated that the Constitution would be able to "grant him that grace" when Boyd requested to die by firing squad, which could lead to death within seconds.

On October 23, 2025, 54-year-old Anthony Todd Boyd was put to death by nitrogen hypoxia at the Holman Correctional Facility, and became the seventh inmate since 2024 to be executed with nitrogen gas by the state of Alabama. Before the nitrogen gas was administered, Boyd said his last words, "I didn't kill anybody. I didn't participate in killing anybody." It was not known when the gas was exactly released, but while he was strapped to the gurney, Boyd was observed to be clenching his fists, raised his head slightly off the gurney and began shaking, and also made heaving breaths for nearly 15 minutes before he became motionless. The curtain to the execution chamber was closed at 6:27pm, and six minutes later, Boyd was pronounced dead at 6:33pm.

As of 2026, Boyd remains the most recent prisoner to be executed by nitrogen hypoxia.

== See also ==
- Capital punishment in Alabama
- List of people executed in Alabama
- List of people executed in the United States in 2025
- List of death row inmates in the United States § Alabama

Executions carried out in Alabama
Preceded by Geoffrey Todd West September 25, 2025	Anthony Todd Boyd; October 23, 2025	Succeeded by Jeremy Tremaine Williams August 13, 2026
Executions carried out in the United States
Preceded by Richard Kenneth Djerf – Arizona October 17, 2025	Anthony Todd Boyd – Alabama; October 23, 2025	Succeeded by Norman Mearle Grim Jr. – Florida October 28, 2025
