= 2016 Citronelle homicides =

Mass murder in Alabama, US

- Location: Citronelle, Alabama, US
- Date: August 20, 2016; 4:10 a.m. (CT)
- Attack type: Mass shooting, mass murder
- Weapons: Axe; Firearms; 12-gauge shotgun; .45-caliber handgun
- Deaths: 6 (including an unborn child)
- Injuries: 0
- Perpetrator: Derrick Ryan Dearman
- Motive: Unknown

On August 20, 2016, a mass murder occurred in Citronelle, Alabama, United States, resulting in the deaths of five people, including a woman who was five months pregnant. They were killed in the early morning in a private residence in a rural area west of the city. The residence was owned by a brother of Laneta Lester, who had sought refuge there. She and her brother's infant were abducted and taken to Leakesville, Mississippi, by her estranged boyfriend, Derrick Dearman, and held for ransom. She was found alive but badly beaten that day. Lester returned with the infant to Citronelle after a ransom was paid. She notified police of the killings. Investigators described this mass killing as the worst in Mobile County's history. The house burned down a couple of weeks after the crime.

Dearman was considered a suspect. He was subsequently arrested after he turned himself in at the Greene County, Mississippi police station. He was extradited to Alabama, where he was charged with six counts of capital murder (including the fetus, under Alabama law) and two counts of abduction with intent to defile and extortion. Initially he pleaded not guilty to the charges. In September of 2018, he pleaded guilty to the capital murder charges. He still had to face a jury trial, which convicted him of the murders, the kidnappings, and the beatings, and sentenced him to death. The Alabama Supreme Court upheld the sentence and authorized the state to set a date for his execution. Dearman's execution date was set by Alabama Governor Kay Ivey for October 17, 2024. He was executed on that date.

== Shootings and melee murders ==
In the early morning of August 20, 2016, a male assailant reportedly entered a residence in the 1700 block of Jim Platt Road about 4 a.m., in a rural area west of Citronelle. He killed five people who were sleeping, including two married couples, and a woman who was five months pregnant. He used a variety of weapons, including an axe and guns. All victims were shot and then slashed with an axe, and all were dead at the scene. He kidnapped Laneta Lester, his estranged girlfriend, and an infant of her brother and his wife; he took them with him to his father's house in Leakesville, Mississippi, about 30 miles to the west. He later released them.

Lester returned to Citronelle with the infant, where she went to the police department and notified authorities about the killings. She said she had been abducted by her estranged boyfriend, Derrick Dearman, and that he had killed the people at the house. The police found the five bodies at the crime scene. They said it would take time to process the crime scene. Initial reports said Lester had escaped from Dearman, but she and the infant were reportedly released by him.

Investigators said that residents had made a 911 call from the house about 1 a.m., several hours before the killings, and reported that Derrick Dearman was on the property. Officers responded to the house, but found no evidence of him on the wooded grounds and left. Investigators initially believed the attacker had used an axe and several firearms that were in the house in the attack, and that the killings were committed in the process of an attempted burglary or abduction. Police found two firearms and a "bladed weapon" at the house. The attack was described as the worst mass killing in the history of Mobile County.

== Victims ==
=== Victims ===
The deceased victims shared the house where the murders took place. It was owned by Lester's married brother, Joseph Adam Turner, who lived there with his wife. Lester was said to have gone there seeking refuge from her ex-boyfriend, Derrick Dearman, who lived in Mississippi. Lester's brother Joseph and his wife were both among the murder victims. The other three adult victims sharing the house included another married couple, of which the woman was five months pregnant.

The victims were named as:

- Joseph Adam Turner, 26, Lester's brother
- Shannon Melissa Randall, 35, Turner's wife
- Robert Lee Brown, 26
- Justin Kaleb Reed, 23
- Chelsea Marie Reed, 22, Justin's wife, who was five months pregnant

== Perpetrator ==
After Lester had notified police, a suspect, identified as Derrick Ryan Dearman (September 14, 1988 – October 17, 2024), surrendered to police in his hometown of Leakesville, Mississippi, located about 30 miles (48 km) to the west of Citronelle. He reportedly surrendered after his father convinced him to do so. Dearman was the estranged boyfriend of Laneta Lester, who left him due to an allegedly abusive relationship and gone to Citronelle to her brother's house, seeking shelter with him. Dearman's ex-wife described him as having "a temper, especially when he doesn't get his way". He had two children from his marriage. In Mississippi, he had accumulated an extensive criminal record.

Alabama quickly extradited Dearman to Citronelle under charges associated with the killings.

== Legal proceedings ==
On August 22, Dearman was extradited to Mobile, Alabama, to face trial. While being escorted to an administrative building, he reportedly said, "Don't do drugs", apologized, and said he turned himself in after realizing what he had done. He later apologized to Lester by name and described the victims as friends. The following day, he said he was on methamphetamine at the time of the killings, and blamed the killings on the influence of the drug.

On August 31, 2016, Dearman was charged with six counts of capital murder (one charge for Chelsea Reed's fetus, under Alabama's fetal homicide law) and two counts of abduction. He pleaded not guilty to all of the counts. It was classified as capital murder first, because it was associated with attempted burglary, and secondly, because two or more persons were killed in commission of the same crime.

A couple of weeks after the murders, the Turner house burned down.

Dearman was assigned two court-appointed defense attorneys. In mid-August 2017, Circuit Judge Rick Stout, at the request of the state, ordered Dearman to receive a mental evaluation, to be completed by the state of Alabama. It was intended to cover three topics: Dearman's competency to stand trial, his mental capacity at the time of the crimes, and his intelligence quotient (IQ). Around this time, one of his attorneys resigned from the case. Dearman objected to having his IQ and competency tested, as he had not made a plea related to either. He tried to establish limits to such testing, but the court denied the motion. The judge was to receive the results of the testing and review them before sharing with the prosecutor and defense.

In September 2018, Dearman pleaded guilty to the charges of capital murder and kidnapping. Under Alabama law, because of the capital murder charges, he was still subject to a jury trial, with the possibility of receiving a death sentence. He had fired his two court-appointed attorneys before entering his plea. The judge ruled that he was fit to stand trial.

At the jury trial, Dearman was found guilty on the six capital murder charges and first-degree kidnapping counts, and the jury approved the death sentence. This was affirmed by the court on October 12, 2018, and Dearman was sentenced to death for these murders.

In April 2024, it was reported that Dearman had given up on trying to overturn his sentence.

On September 3, 2024, the Alabama Supreme Court approved the death warrant of Dearman, who was scheduled to be executed on October 17, 2024.

He was executed at 6:14 PM on October 17. His last meal was a seafood platter brought to the prison from a local restaurant, consisting of "fried catfish, three fried shrimp, three boiled shrimp, three fried oysters, three onion rings, a deviled crab and two sides".

== See also ==
- Capital punishment in Alabama
- List of people executed in Alabama
- List of people executed in the United States in 2024
- Volunteer (capital punishment)

Executions carried out in Alabama
Preceded by Alan Eugene Miller September 26, 2024	Derrick Ryan Dearman; October 17, 2024	Succeeded by Carey Dale Grayson November 21, 2024
Executions carried out in the United States
Preceded by Garcia Glen White – Texas October 1, 2024	Derrick Ryan Dearman – Alabama; October 17, 2024	Succeeded by Richard Bernard Moore – South Carolina November 1, 2024
