= Murder of Quenette Shehane =

1976 kidnapping, rape and murder in Alabama

- Location: Birmingham, Alabama, United States
- Date: December 20, 1976
- Perpetrators: Wallace Norrell Thomas; Eddie Bernard Neal; Jerry Lee Jones
- Convictions: Thomas: Capital murder; Neal: Capital murder; Jones: First-degree murder
- Sentence: Thomas: Death; Neal: Life without parole; Jones: Death, commuted to life with parole

On December 20, 1976, in Birmingham, Alabama, 21-year-old Quenette Shehane (September 21, 1955 – December 20, 1976) was kidnapped by a group of three men at a parking lot of a store. Shehane was raped and shot to death by the trio. The three kidnappers, Wallace Norrell Thomas, Eddie Bernard Neal and Jerry Lee Jones, were all arrested and charged with capital murder. Of all the three, Neal was sentenced to life without parole, while both Thomas and Jones were sentenced to death. Jones's sentence was commuted to life imprisonment for a lesser charge of first-degree murder after two re-trials. Thomas was ultimately executed in the electric chair on July 13, 1990.

== Murder ==
On December 20, 1976, in Birmingham, Alabama, 21-year-old Quenette Shehane, who recently graduated from Birmingham–Southern College, stayed on the campus with her fiancé to cook steaks together for a meal. On that night itself, Shehane, who planned to return home for Christmas, left the premises in order to buy salad dressing from a nearby convenience store. After arriving at the store, Shehane encountered a group of three men, who kidnapped her and forced her into their car.

The three men, Wallace Norrell Thomas, Jerry Lee Jones and Edward Bernard Neal (also known as Eddie Neal), were students of Daniel Payne College, and they lived in an apartment nearby the scene of Shehane's abduction. Prior to the kidnapping, John Andrew Mays, Jones's roommate, overheard the trio discussing about "going out and pick up some young ladies" inside the room he and Jones stayed before the trio departed, leaving him alone. According to Mays, when he left the apartment later that night to go to his sister's house, he witnessed a woman being pushed into an automobile by a man. While he could not identify the man or his race, he recognized the automobile to be Jones's vehicle.

After kidnapping Shehane, the three men confined her for hours inside the car, and she was being tortured and raped repeatedly during that period. Subsequently, Shehane tried to escape from the men but she was shot to death. Shehane's body was found a day later, abandoned nine feet away from a roadway in Birmingham. According to an autopsy report, there were numerous bruises and scrapes, as well as six gunshot wounds, on Shehane's corpse.

After the trio killed Shehane, one of the men, Thomas, contacted Edward Lynn, who studied at the same college as the three men, to help fetch him and the two others. Lynn, who met up with the trio at a convenience store, noticed that both Neal and Jones had bloodstains on their clothes, and Thomas told Lynn that Jones and Neal had gotten into a fight. Nevertheless, Lynn brought the trio back to the apartment.

== Murder trials ==
=== Arrest of Wallace Thomas and Jerry Jones ===
After the discovery of Quenette Shehane's murder, the police began to investigate the crime, and appealed to the public for witnesses and any crucial information to identify and arrest the suspects. Two days after the murder, a $17,000 reward was posted for the arrest of the killers. The amount later rose to $20,000, and then to $21,000 by December 31, 1976.

On February 8, 1977, Wallace Thomas was the first to be charged for Shehane's murder. Thomas was linked to the killing while he was detained for an unrelated robbery charge since January 1977, and he was therefore charged with the murder after further investigations.

After the arrest of Thomas, both Eddie Neal and Jerry Jones were placed on the wanted list and a manhunt was conducted for the pair. One of the fugitives, Jones, was eventually arrested on February 13, 1977, for his involvement in the murder.

On March 2, 1977, a grand jury formally indicted Thomas for the capital murder of Shehane.

On March 16, 1977, a grand jury indicted Jones for the capital murder of Shehane.

=== Jerry Jones's trial ===
On August 29, 1977, Jerry Jones became the first member of the trio to stand trial for the murder of Shehane.

On September 1, 1977, the jury found Jones guilty and convicted him of capital murder.

On September 16, 1977, Jones was sentenced to death via the electric chair by Circuit Judge Charles Crowder.

=== Wallace Thomas's trial ===
On October 30, 1977,Wallace Thomas was the second member of the trio to stand trial for the murder of Shehane, and jury selection commenced on the first day of his trial.

On November 3, 1977, the jury found Thomas guilty of capital murder and voted to impose the death penalty.

On March 13, 1978, Circuit Judge Joseph Hocklander formally sentenced Thomas to death by electrocution for the capital murder of Shehane.

=== Arrest and trial of Eddie Neal ===
More than a year after he participated in the murder of Shehane, Eddie Neal was arrested in Los Angeles on March 29, 1978. He was extradited back to Alabama to face charges of murdering Shehane.

On August 4, 1978, Neal was found guilty of capital murder. Like both Thomas and Jones before him, the jury recommended the death penalty for Neal, although the judge had the prerogative to either impose the death sentence or commute it to life imprisonment without the possibility of parole.

On August 7, 1978, Circuit Judge Charles Nice overrode the jury's recommendation of capital punishment and instead sentenced Neal to life without parole, thus sparing Neal the death sentence.

== Re-trials ==
=== Jones's two re-trials ===
In September 1979, Jones's death sentence and murder conviction were overturned as a result of legal technicalities.

In December 1979, a re-trial was carried out for Jones. On December 13, 1979, Jones was found guilty of capital murder a second time, and the jury likewise recommended the death penalty for him.

In August 1981, Jones was granted a new trial upon his appeal to the Alabama Court of Criminal Appeals.

A second re-trial for Jones was thus carried out in 1982. On March 4, 1982, Jones was found guilty of a lesser charge of first-degree murder, which did not carry the death penalty under Alabama state law. As a result, Jones was spared a third possible death sentence and was re-sentenced to life in prison with the possibility of parole after ten years.

=== Thomas's re-trial ===
Thomas's conviction and death sentence were both overturned by the federal courts in favour of a new trial. In June 1981, the state's appeal to further oppose the decision was denied by the Alabama Supreme Court.

On May 17, 1982, Thomas officially stood trial before a different jury for the capital murder of Quenette Shehane.

On May 19, 1982, Thomas was convicted of capital murder a second time by the jury.

On May 20, 1982, the jury recommended the death penalty for Thomas, and Circuit Judge Robert L. Byrd Jr. was set to formally sentence Thomas on July 9, 1982.

=== Neal's re-trial ===
On May 1, 1979, Eddie Neal's appeal against his life sentence and capital murder conviction was denied by the Alabama Court of Criminal Appeals. During the appeal hearing, one of the judges, John O. Harris, remarked that Neal was extremely fortunate to have escaped the death penalty despite his conviction for capital murder. The remaining two judges, John DeCarlo and Bill Bowen, stated that they found Neal deserving of the death penalty.

By 1982, Neal's conviction and sentence were both overturned, after the U.S. Supreme Court struck down parts of the state death penalty laws in Alabama, enabling Neal's case to be reopened for another trial.

On August 11, 1982, it was confirmed that Neal would not face the death penalty in this re-trial.

On August 13, 1982, Neal was once again found guilty and sentenced to life without parole for the capital murder of Shehane.

== Execution of Wallace Thomas ==
On October 4, 1983, the Alabama Court of Criminal Appeals rejected Thomas's appeal against his second death sentence.

On August 24, 1984, Thomas's appeal was denied by the Alabama Supreme Court.

On February 10, 1987, the Alabama Court of Criminal Appeals dismissed Thomas's second appeal.

On May 20, 1990, the U.S. Supreme Court rejected Thomas's appeal. Two days later, the state filed a motion to schedule an execution date for Thomas. In June 1990, it was reported that Thomas's death warrant was approved and that his death sentence would be carried out on July 13, 1990.

As a final recourse to evade the death penalty, Thomas filed last-minute appeals against the death sentence. However, U.S. District Judge Alex T. Howard Jr. rejected his appeal on July 10, 1990. Thomas's final appeal was also denied on a 7–2 vote by the U.S. Supreme Court.

On July 13, 1990, 35-year-old Wallace Norrell Thomas was put to death by the electric chair at the Holman Correctional Facility. In his final statement, Thomas, who proclaimed his innocence, stated, "Let my death serve as an instigator that will awaken a nation to fight and adopt the philosophy of the late, great Dr. Martin Luther King Jr., who said, 'Injustice anywhere is a threat to justice everywhere.'"

== Imprisonment of Jones and Neal ==
After their respective sentencings, Eddie Neal was incarcerated at the St. Clair County Correctional Facility as of 2015, while Jerry Jones remained incarcerated at the Elmore Correctional Facility as of 2023. Jones previously served his sentence at the Staton Correctional Facility according to a 2015 report.

Both Neal and Jones appealed against their convictions and sentences, but on June 13, 1984, their appeals were rejected by the Alabama Court of Criminal Appeals.

Jones, whose life sentence carried the possibility of parole, first became eligible for parole in 2003, but he was refused parole by the Alabama Board of Pardons and Paroles. That same year, Jones filed a lawsuit against the Alabama Department of Corrections, claiming that the parole board denied him parole because he was falsely classified as a "sex offender" in his file.

On August 4, 2008, Jones was unanimously denied parole a second time by the state parole board. Jones's third parole hearing came five years later in September 2013, and he was once again denied parole. After another five years, Jones was reviewed for parole the fourth time in November 2018, and the parole board refused to release him after deliberating his case.

== Aftermath ==
The murder of Quenette Shehane was considered as one of Alabama's most heinous murders, as well as one of the state's high-profile crimes to happen during the Christmas seasons in Alabama history.

In 1977, a year after Shehane's murder, the Birmingham–Southern College erected an iron wall as a security perimeter for the 192-acre campus located in the Bush Hills neighborhood. The college eventually closed in 2024 due to financial difficulties in recent years, and the campus was acquired by the U.S. Coast Guard to use as its new training center.

After the murder of her daughter, Shehane's mother Miriam, who was then working as a bank employee, decided to become a victim's rights activist. Six years after the killing, in 1982, Shehane's mother and other crime victims established a non-profit organization, Victims of Crime and Leniency (VOCAL). Before the founding of the group, they successfully convinced the Legislature to abolish a trial rule that allowed defense attorneys to remove two potential jurors for every one the prosecution could dismiss. Jimmy Evans, a former state attorney general and former Montgomery County district attorney, reportedly encouraged Shehane's mother to set up the group, and this marked the beginning of the victim's rights movement in Alabama.

As the first president of VOCAL, Shehane's mother advocated alongside the group for a new law that enabled the relatives of crime victims to be in the courtroom if they were going to testify, which overturned the previous law that barred the victims' relatives from entering the courtroom if they were to testify in court. VOCAL was also crucial in persuading the Legislature to pass laws in favour of victim's rights, including a state fund to compensate crime victims and their families, allowing victims of violent crimes to receive notifications of the inmates' parole hearings, and permitting crime victims to be seated next to the prosecution on the same table during court trials.

On June 17, 2024, Shehane's mother died at the age of 91. Wanda Miller stated in an email interview that Shehane's mother was a "true hero" for honoring her daughter by aiding the victims of crime and fighting for their rights. Attorney General Steve Marshall acknowledged in 2025 that Shehane's mother was a "true champion" of victim's rights and noted that prior to her advocacy, there was a "significant deficiency" in the state's support for victim's rights.

In May 2015, Investigation Discovery Channel's true crime show, On the Case with Paula Zahn, re-enacted the murder of Shehane and the episode, titled Fatal Errand aired that same month.

== See also ==
- Capital punishment in Alabama
- List of people executed in Alabama
- List of people executed in the United States in 1990
