= James Hubbard (murderer) =

American murderer (1930–2004)

- Born: James Barney Hubbard; March 7, 1930
- Died: August 5, 2004 (aged 74); Holman Correctional Facility, Atmore, Alabama, U.S.
- Children: 2
- Status: Executed
- Convictions: Second-degree murder (1957); Capital murder (1977)
- Penalty: 50 years in prison (1957); Death (1977)

Details
- Victims: 2 (David Dockery, Lillian Montgomery)

James Barney Hubbard (March 7, 1930 – August 5, 2004) was an American convicted murderer who was sentenced to death and executed by the U.S. state of Alabama for the 1977 murder of 62-year-old Lillian Montgomery, whom Hubbard had been living with following his release from prison for a separate murder conviction.

On January 10, 1977, then-46-year-old Hubbard called police to report a shooting at Montgomery's home in Tuscaloosa, Alabama, alleging that Montgomery had fatally shot herself. Hubbard, who had previously served a 20-year sentence for a different murder, was subsequently convicted of Montgomery's murder and sentenced to death.

In 2004, more than 27 years after Montgomery's murder, Hubbard was executed by lethal injection. At the age of 74, he was the oldest person to be executed in the United States in decades.

== Background ==
In 1957, Hubbard was sentenced to 50 years in prison following his second-degree murder conviction in the death of David Dockery in Tuscaloosa County, Alabama, after his claim of self-defense was rejected. Hubbard was released on parole 19 years later in October 1976. He moved into the home of 62-year-old storeowner Lillian Montgomery, who had befriended and sponsored Hubbard to gain his release.

== Murder ==
In January 1977, Hubbard shot Montgomery three times and robbed her of her gold and diamond wristwatch, along with about $500 in cash and checks. Hubbard subsequently called police and reported that he had been drinking whiskey with Montgomery, who fatally shot herself. Montgomery died as a result of three gunshot wounds—one each to the face, head, and shoulder. Nitrate tests revealed a small amount of gunpowder residue on both of Hubbard's hands, as well as on Montgomery's right hand.

Hubbard was indicted on February 18, 1977. Later that year, Hubbard was found guilty of first-degree murder. In October 1977, he was sentenced to execution by lethal injection.

== Execution ==
Before Hubbard's execution, his lawyers appealed to the Supreme Court of the United States against his execution on the grounds of his age and ill health, with one stating: "He is a sick, frail man. He is harmless, and it makes no sense for the state of Alabama to have executed him." Hubbard was suffering from cancer, hepatitis, and dementia.

The Supreme Court denied a stay of execution in a 5–4 ruling, and Alabama Governor Bob Riley rejected a request to commute Hubbard's sentence to life in prison, stating: "Justice has not been swift in this case, but justice must be delivered."

Hubbard's last meal was two eggs over-medium, four pieces of bacon, sliced tomatoes, fried green tomatoes, pineapple slices with mayonnaise, white bread, a banana, and a medium-sized V8.

Hubbard was executed on August 5, 2004, at Holman Correctional Facility in Atmore, Alabama, more than 27 years after Montgomery's murder. He did not provide any last words. Hubbard's execution was witnessed by his son and daughter, as well as six members of Montgomery's family. Hubbard was 74 years old at the time of his execution, making him the oldest inmate to be executed in the United States since the reinstatement of the death penalty in 1976, as well as the oldest inmate to be executed in the U.S. since the execution of 76-year-old James Stephens of Colorado in 1941.

== See also ==
- List of people executed in Alabama
- List of people executed in the United States in 2004
- List of death row inmates in the United States
- Capital punishment in Alabama

Executions carried out in Alabama
Preceded by Thomas Jerry Fortenberry August 7, 2003	James Barney Hubbard; August 5, 2004	Succeeded by David Kevin Hocker September 30, 2004
