= Jack Trawick =

American serial killer (1947–2009)

- Born: February 18, 1947; Birmingham, Alabama, U.S.
- Died: June 11, 2009 (aged 62); Holman Correctional Facility, Alabama, U.S.
- Status: Executed by lethal injection
- Conviction: Capital murder (2 counts)
- Penalty: Gach murder Death; Pruitt murder Life imprisonment without the possibility of parole

Details
- Victims: 5–14
- Date: 1972–1992
- Country: United States
- Locations: Alabama, Oregon, Alaska
- Imprisoned at: Holman Correctional Facility

Jack Harrison Trawick (February 18, 1947 – June 11, 2009) was an American serial killer convicted of two murders in Alabama. On June 17, 1992, Trawick killed 27-year-old Aileen Pruitt by stabbing her multiple times. Four months after Pruitt's killing, Trawick raped and murdered 21-year-old college student Stephanie Gach on October 9, 1992. Apart from these two murders, Trawick also confessed to killing Betty Jo Richards in 1972 and several more women, bringing his suspected victim count to a range of five to 14.

After his arrest on October 29, 1992, Trawick was found guilty and sentenced to death for the murder of Stephanie Gach in 1994, and was executed by lethal injection on June 11, 2009. Trawick was additionally tried for the murder of Aileen Pruitt in 1995, and sentenced to life without parole, although he did not face further trial proceedings for the other killings due to his death sentence for murdering Gach.

== Personal life ==
Born in Birmingham, Alabama, on February 18, 1947, Jack Harrison Trawick was the second of two children in his family. Trawick's father was originally from Egypt, before his family emigrated from Egypt to New Orleans, Louisiana, where Trawick's father became a naturalized American citizen. Trawick grew up in a middle-class neighborhood, and he attended Shades Valley High School as a youth, before graduating in 1966, and marrying his high school girlfriend a year later. Trawick, who attended Jefferson State Community College but often failed most of his grades, dropped out to join the navy. Although he was known to get along well with others in his younger years, Trawick was noted to have a violent temper and also had a history of violence against women since his youth and adulthood.

Trawick had served prison sentences before, having been charged with burglary, impersonating a police officer, kidnapping, making threatening calls, breaking and entering and property destruction. He was diagnosed as "a paranoid schizophrenic with homicidal impulses," in 1970 and was divorced in 1971. Notably, Trawick was arrested in 1980 for phone harassment, centering around his phone calls to several women and telling them their husbands were either killed or injured. He was subsequently sentenced to two years in prison for three counts of impersonating a law enforcement officer.

== Murders ==
=== Confirmed ===
Betty Jo Richards

On July 16, 1972, Trawick killed his first victim, 17-year-old Betty Jo Richards, in Quinton, Alabama. According to early reports, Richards was found stabbed to death at an alley, and witnesses had reportedly last saw her screaming while she was chased by a white man into the alley before she was discovered dead. Originally, a 30-year-old man named Thomas G. Barnett was arrested as a suspect but he was ultimately not charged for the crime.

The death of Richards remained unsolved for about 20 years until Trawick confessed to the crime. Trawick confessed that when he was driving in downtown Birmingham, he encountered Richards and hatched a plan to "do something" to her, and he thus threatened her at knifepoint, walked her to an alley before lethally stabbing the girl more than ten times.

Aileen Pruitt

On June 17, 1992, nearly 20 years after committing his first murder, Trawick murdered 26-year-old prostitute Frances Aileen Pruitt, better known as Aileen Pruitt, in Birmingham, Alabama.

At that time, Pruitt was estranged from her husband and struggled with cocaine addiction, and she thus turned to prostitution to sustain her drug addiction. Pruitt encountered Trawick, who spotted her alone on a sidewalk and picked her up. Afterwards, upon the instructions of Pruitt, he drove her to a dirt road behind Hill Crest Hospital, where he stopped the car before stabbing her in the throat with a knife. After killing Pruitt, Trawick proceeded to mutilate Pruitt's body; a total of 57 knife wounds were inflicted on her. The body of Pruitt was found by a security guard two days after her murder.

Prior to the arrest of Trawick, Pruitt's husband was originally arrested as a suspect, before the confession of Trawick led to the prosecution dropping all charges against him.

Stephanie Gach

On October 9, 1992, four months after murdering Pruitt, Trawick killed 21-year-old community college student Stephanie Alexis Gach in Birmingham.

Trawick committed the crime on the night of October 9, 1992, when he first targeted Gach by stalking her all the way from a shopping mall to her apartment. As Gach was walking from her parking space to her apartment, Trawick pulled up beside her in a van and forced her to enter the van at gunpoint (Trawick used a toy gun). Gach was gagged and tied up by Trawick, who drove to a secluded area, where he bludgeoned Gach in the head with a hammer, and subsequently strangled her, and stabbed her in the chest with a knife.

After murdering Gach, Trawick disposed of the body by throwing it on the side of a road, and also threw out the contents of her wallet. He also cleaned the blood from the van at his house. A day after Trawick killed Gach, the police responded to a missing person report filed by Gach's mother, who found that her daughter did not return home the previous night. An autopsy report showed that the cause of death was strangulation and a fatal three-inch knife wound to Gach's heart.

=== Suspected ===
Apart from the three above victims, Trawick additionally confessed to at least two murders, which brought the suspected total count to between five and 14.

The police also suspected Trawick to be involved in several other homicides apart from the ones he confessed to. In one of these Alabama cases, Trawick was named a suspect in the unsolved killing of 23-year-old Toni Lim at her apartment in March 1990. In 2006, DNA linked Steven Petric to the crime, for which he was eventually convicted and sentenced to death. However, his conviction was overturned in 2018, and Petric later pleaded guilty to the murder in exchange for a reduced sentence of 28 years imprisonment.

In another Alabama case, Trawick was suspected to be involved in the disappearance of Dr. Michele Saint Romain (aged 26) in June 1991. In 1999, convicted kidnapper Michael McNeily was convicted of her murder and sentenced to life imprisonment.

On top of this, Trawick confessed to killing a woman (estimated to be 30 years old) in 1978 in Alaska by strangling and throwing the unnamed woman overboard while he was boarding a ferry along the waters between Prince Rupert, British Columbia and Ketchikan. Trawick also strangled a female hitchhiker to death in Oregon in 1978 while accompanying his family members to visit his sister.

In a further 2003 confession (published on a website devoted to Trawick), Trawick also admitted to killing several more women in Oregon and Alabama, some were identified as "Dr. Virginia Bryant", "Michelle Thomas" and "Susan Hill", a woman known only as Kim and a nameless mother and daughter. However, these claims were uncorroborated.

== Trial ==
Between 1994 and 1995, Trawick was tried for the murders of both Stephanie Gach and Aileen Pruitt respectively.

=== Gach murder trial ===
On March 21, 1994, jury selection began for Trawick's trial, where he faced charges of capital murder in connection with Gach's death. Under Alabama state law, the offence of capital murder carries the death penalty.

On March 23, 1994, the jury found Trawick guilty of capital murder after an hour and 40 minutes of deliberation over the case.

On May 5, 1994, Jefferson County Circuit Judge James Hard followed the jury's recommendation and formally sentenced Trawick to death for the capital murder of Gach.

=== Pruitt murder trial ===
On October 23, 1995, Trawick's second murder trial for the death of Aileen Pruitt began with jury selection. During the trial itself, Trawick also pleaded innocent by mental illness. The jury also heard a taped confession by Trawick, who admitted to the murder of Pruitt and recounted how he committed the crime. Additionally, Trawick mentioned in the tape that he felt some remorse for the death of Pruitt, after he saw a photo of Pruitt's young son inside her purse.

On October 25, 1995, the jury found Trawick guilty of the murder of Pruitt. After taking into account of Trawick's previous criminal records, Jefferson County Circuit Judge James Hard sentenced Trawick to life imprisonment without the possibility of parole, the maximum sentence he was bound by law to impose for the charge of murder, which did not carry the death penalty like the capital murder charge preferred against Trawick for Gach's killing.

== Appeal process ==
Trawick appealed his death sentence, but on November 9, 1995, Alabama Court of Criminal Appeals rejected his appeal. The Alabama Supreme Court dismissed a subsequent appeal on February 28, 1997. On March 18, 2008, the 11th Circuit Court of Appeals turned down another appeal, and finally, on November 17, 2008, Trawick's final appeal was denied by the U.S. Supreme Court, which confirmed his death sentence.

== Death row and execution ==
After he was sentenced to death in 1994, Jack Trawick was incarcerated on death row at the Holman Correctional Facility for the next 15 years.

In December 2003, it was reported that several murderers, including Trawick, had the details of their crimes published online. In the website that covered the crimes of Trawick, he had allegedly taunted the mother of one of his victims by her name. This sparked outrage from the families of his victims, and Stephanie Gach's mother, who lost her daughter to Trawick, stated that she was "mad" about it and there was no right for Trawick to mention her daughter's name. Prior to this, Gach's mother had expressed in a 2001 interview that while she opposed the death penalty due to her Catholic faith, she was firm in her belief that Trawick should suffer the consequences for his actions and be executed for murdering her daughter, whom she described as her "best friend".

After the publication of Trawick's crimes on the internet, Gach's surviving family members filed a lawsuit against Trawick in 2004. However, three years later, in 2007, Trawick offered sales of his drawings of young women's mutilated corpses through the internet, which reignited controversial reactions to his case. Subsequently, a bill was proposed to prevent murderers or rapists from gaining profit through the sale of their artwork or writings about their crimes, and these proceeds were to be given to the victims and their families. Gach's mother expressed support for the bill.

On June 11, 2009, 62-year-old Jack Harrison Trawick was put to death by lethal injection at the Holman Correctional Facility. Trawick's execution was the 43rd documented execution to happen after the state's 1983 resumption of executions, as well as the 196th execution in the state since 1927. Trawick was the 19th condemned inmate executed by lethal injection.

Prior to his execution, Trawick ordered a last meal of fried chicken, French fries, onion soup and a roll. Stephanie Gach's sister Heather, as well as Aileen Pruitt's sister Donna Middlebrooks, attended the execution of Trawick.

== See also ==
- Capital punishment in Alabama
- List of people executed in Alabama
- List of people executed in the United States in 2009
- List of people executed by lethal injection
- List of serial killers in the United States
