= Brian Baldwin =

African-American man executed in 1999

Brian Keith Baldwin (July 16, 1958 – June 18, 1999) was an Black American man from Charlotte, North Carolina, United States of America, who was executed in 1999 in Alabama. Many believe that he was wrongfully convicted of the 1977 rape and murder of a 16-year-old Hispanic girl in Monroe County whom he and another individual had kidnapped and held captive for approximately forty hours before her murder.

Baldwin's involvement in the initial robbery and kidnapping of the victim is undisputed, but he later claimed that his confession to his direct participation to the murder was false. He said he made it under coercion by the local police in Wilcox County, Alabama, where he was arrested, accusing them of beating him under interrogation. The allegations were disputed and advocates for Baldwin were accused of falsifying evidence of torture. The justices for the Alabama Court of Criminal Appeals said they had listened to the videotape of Baldwin's confession and found nothing that indicated possible coercion.

Death penalty opponents regard this case as one in which racial bias contributed to the wrongful conviction by an all-white jury of an 18-year-old black man, in a county that was 46% black in population. Further, they believe he was executed despite evidence that he did not commit Rolón's murder. The appeals process was marked by conflicts of interest, as the presiding judge at Baldwin's trial also ruled on the appeals, against common practice. Before Baldwin's execution in 1999, leading political and religious figures petitioned Governor Don Siegelman for clemency on his behalf. Siegelman refused, saying that although he was "deeply troubled by some of the matters raised," he wrote "this matter does not rise to a level that warrants clemency."

== Background ==
Brian Keith Baldwin was born in Charlotte, North Carolina in 1958. As a juvenile, Baldwin was charged with kidnapping and rape in North Carolina. He was adjudged delinquent on a lesser charge of assault with intent to commit rape.

In March 1977, Baldwin was serving time in a juvenile facility in western North Carolina for robbery. On March 12, at age 18, he escaped with Edward Dean Horsley Jr. (known as Ed Dean, August 25, 1957 – February 16, 1996), then age 19, who had been convicted of armed robbery, a felony during which a police officer was shot.

== Events ==
In March 1977, Naomi Minerva Rolón, a 16-year-old Hispanic girl, was driving in Hudson, North Carolina across town to visit her father in a hospital. She encountered Baldwin and Horsley—both prison escapees—hours after they had escaped from a detention facility and while Rolón was experiencing car trouble. Rolón was overpowered and forced into the trunk of her car. Baldwin and Horsley then drove to Charlotte, where Rolón was raped and sodomized before being forced back into the trunk of her vehicle.

Over the course of approximately forty hours, Rolón was held captive by both men in the trunk of her car and on two occasions, received non-fatal stab wounds when she began screaming and both opened the trunk to stab and silence her. The two drove through Georgia to Monroe County, Alabama. Horsley went off in the car with Rolón, returning alone. She was killed on March 14, 1977. The police found Rolón's body and car beside a rural road in Monroe County. The next day, March 15, the pair stole a truck in nearby Wilcox County, Alabama, where they were captured and arrested after a high-speed chase by county police. The automobile tag from the victim's car was found in the truck.

They were taken to court in Monroe County, where Rolón had been found. They were each indicted for aggravated robbery and murder. This combination of charges amounted to capital crime; each man was thus eligible for the state's mandatory death penalty if convicted. The presiding judge at trial would hold a sentencing hearing to determine if there were mitigating circumstances to reduce the penalty. Each was tried separately. Horsley confessed to the murder of Rolón. He was executed for capital murder in 1996.

Baldwin later said that after he was arrested as a suspect, the local police beat him and subjected him to shocks from an electric cattle-prod, forcing him to confess to Rolón's murder. He later retracted the confession. Three fellow inmates claimed that they had seen bruises Baldwin's back and body after the interrogation. However, only one of them testified and another fellow inmate said he saw Baldwin in jail and that he was not threatened or tortured at any point.

Advocates for Baldwin claimed to have an affidavit from Nathaniel Manzie, the only black deputy sheriff in Monroe County at the time, stating that he had seen Baldwin being beaten to coerce his confession and that a cattle prod was present at the jail, and he had falsely signed an affidavit saying that Baldwin had been advised of his rights, including the right to counsel. However, the district attorney general accused of them of filing false affidavits. Manzie testified that he had never said this and later personally told Governor Don Siegelman that he had not seen the beating.

The trial and verdict were completed in 1 1/2 days, August 8 and 9, 1977. Baldwin was convicted of capital murder by an all-white jury, although the population of the area of the jury pool was 46% black. Baldwin's parents were not informed of his whereabouts until after the trial ended, and he was convicted of capital murder.

== Appeals ==
The direct appeal related to whether Alabama had jurisdiction to try the case since the abduction and robbery of Rolón occurred in North Carolina. The charges increased to kidnapping after she was taken across state lines. Judge Robert E. Lee Key, who had presided over Baldwin's trial and conviction, heard this appeal. But it is normally accepted in law that the same judge cannot preside over a hearing to appeal his own case. He ruled that Alabama had jurisdiction because Rolón's murder was committed there.

Multiple appeals of Baldwin's case were filed on the conviction and trial proceedings, based primarily on the following issues:

- Failure to advise suspect of rights, including right to counsel
- Coerced confession under torture
- Ineffective defense counsel
- Racially biased jury selection

In 1985, Horsley claimed that he alone had committed the murder of Rolón and Baldwin had not known of her death. The prosecutor's office did not give this letter to Baldwin's counsel until after Horsley's execution in 1996.

Baldwin's appeals case was taken to the United States Supreme Court, by which time 33 senior judges and prosecutors had signed a letter supporting Baldwin. The Supreme Court declined to reverse the conviction on murder and the death sentence. The Pope, former president Jimmy Carter, the Archbishop of Mobile, Alabama; 26 members of the Congressional Black Caucus of the United States Congress, and Coretta King, widow of Martin Luther King, petitioned the state to prevent Baldwin's execution, but they were unsuccessful.

During an investigation in 1999, in an attempt to recover case evidence for DNA analysis (not available at the time of the trial), it was found that all evidence in the case was lost or destroyed after Baldwin's execution.

== See also ==
- Capital punishment in Alabama
- Capital punishment in the United States
- List of people executed in Alabama
- List of people executed in the United States in 1999
- List of people executed by electrocution
