= Murder of Vickie Deblieux =

1994 murder in Jefferson County, Alabama

- Date: February 21–22, 1994
- Location: Jefferson County, Alabama, U.S.
- Convicted: Carey Dale Grayson, 19; Kenneth Loggins, 17; Trace Royal Duncan, 17; Louis Christopher Mangione, 16
- Convictions: Capital murder (all 4)
- Sentence: Grayson; Death (1996); Loggins; Death (1996), commuted to life in prison without the possibility of parole (2006) (Note: After a 2012 landmark case banned the mandatory sentencing of juveniles to life without parole, Loggins applied for his life sentence to carry the possibility of parole in 2018 but he was denied the chance of parole.); Duncan; Death (1996), later commuted to life in prison with the possibility of parole after 35 years (Note: After his death sentence was set aside in favor of life imprisonment in 2005, Duncan's life sentence originally did not carry the possibility of parole. However in 2012, a landmark case banned the mandatory sentencing of juveniles to life without parole, enabling Duncan to be granted the chance for parole after a minimum of 35 years.); Mangione; Life in prison with the possibility of parole after 35 years (Note: Mangione's original sentence was life without parole, which was imposed in 1996. In 2012, a landmark case banned the mandatory sentencing of juveniles to life without parole, enabling Mangione to be granted the chance for parole after a minimum of 35 years.)

On February 21, 1994, in Jefferson County, Alabama, United States, 37-year-old Vickie Deblieux (Note: Her name is spelled as "Vicki DeBlieux".) (April 18, 1956 – February 22, 1994) was kidnapped, tortured and murdered by a group of four youths while she was hitchhiking from Tennessee to her mother's house in Louisiana. Deblieux's body was discovered four days after the murder, and the police later managed to arrest all four killers responsible.

One of the four perpetrators, Louis Mangione, who was 16 at the time of the murder, was given a life sentence, while the remaining three members of the group were sentenced to death for murder. However, two of them, Kenneth Loggins and Trace Duncan, were 17 at the time of the offense. Their death sentences were commuted to life imprisonment in 2006, after Alabama agreed to change the law and prohibit the execution of minors younger than 18 at the time of their offenses, leaving the final member, Carey Dale Grayson, to remain on death row.

Grayson's death warrant was approved by the Supreme Court, and he was executed by nitrogen gas inhalation on November 21, 2024. Grayson was the third person to undergo execution by nitrogen gas in Alabama, after Kenneth Eugene Smith and Alan Eugene Miller.

== Murder ==
Vickie Deblieux
- Born: Vickie Lynn DeBlieux; April 18, 1956; West Monroe, Ouachita Parish, Louisiana, U.S.
- Died: February 22, 1994 (aged 37); Jefferson County, Alabama, U.S.
- Resting place: Mulhearn Memorial Park Cemetery
- Known for: Victim of a kidnapping and murder case
- Children: 2

On the night of February 21, 1994, 37-year-old Vicki Lynn DeBlieux, better known as Vickie Deblieux, was dropped off by a friend near Chattanooga, Tennessee and began hitchhiking to her mother's house in West Monroe, Louisiana. That was the last time she was seen alive.

While she was passing through Jefferson County, Alabama, Deblieux encountered a group of four youths, who were all drinking alcohol and using drugs when they first met her. The four youths – 19-year-old Carey Dale Grayson, 17-year-old Trace Royal Duncan, 16-year-old Louis Christopher Mangione, and 17-year-old Kenneth Loggins (Kenny Loggins or Kenney Loggins) – offered her a ride to Louisiana. However, while they were driving in the van, the group deviated from the route and instead took Deblieux to a wooded area, on the pretense of picking up another vehicle.

After reaching the forest, the four began to drink and threw their beer bottles at Deblieux, who tried to escape. The youths managed to restrain her and tackled her to the ground and they started to assault Deblieux by kicking her repeatedly all over her body. When they noticed that the victim was still alive, Grayson and Loggins stood on her throat. As a result, Deblieux gurgled blood and later died in the early hours of February 22, 1994.

After murdering Deblieux, the four kept her luggage and body inside the back of a pickup truck and drove to Bald Rock Mountain, where they pilfered her ring and clothes and sexually abused her body before throwing it off the cliff. The body was left behind while the youths drove the truck to Pell City to clean the vehicle and remove the bloodstains. They also disposed of Deblieux's luggage in the woods. The four drove back to Birmingham, where Mangione was dropped off home before the others returned to Bald Rock Mountain, where the trio mutilated Deblieux's corpse by stabbing and cutting the corpse 180 times, and they also amputated the fingers, thumbs, and part of Deblieux's lung.

The trio then spent the night in Birmingham, falling asleep in the truck. The next morning, Grayson's girlfriend found the three sleeping, covered in mud and blood. When his girlfriend probed him about the bloodstains, Grayson lied to her that they got all the blood from a dog.

On February 26, 1994, Deblieux's body was discovered by three rock climbers. An autopsy revealed that the cause of death was blunt force trauma to the head and asphyxiation was a possible contributing factor. Deblieux's face was so badly shattered that she was identified from a previous X-ray of her spine. Her fingers had also been cut off. Investigators revealed that the four teenagers were identified as suspects after one of them displayed a severed finger to a friend and bragged about the murder.

By April 1994, all four youths were arrested and charged for the torture and murder of Vickie Deblieux.

== Trial of the murderers ==
Between November 1995 and February 1996, the four were tried in separate state courts in Alabama for the murder of Vickie Deblieux.

On November 2, 1995, two weeks before his 19th birthday, Duncan became the first out of the four to be convicted of murder, and the jury recommended that Duncan should be sentenced to death. He was scheduled to be sentenced in January 1996.

Mangione was the second offender to be convicted on November 18, 1995. Mangione was spared the death sentence after the jury recommended that he be sentenced to the minimum punishment of life in prison without the possibility of parole.

Loggins was initially set to stand trial in September 1995, but his trial was delayed due to the psychologist failing to submit a report on time to determine Loggins's mental state at the time, and it was rescheduled on November 27, 1995. Loggins, who pleaded innocent by insanity, was subsequently convicted in December of that same year, and among the 12-member jury, ten jurors recommended the death penalty.

Grayson was the final member of the four to be tried, and his trial began on January 29, 1996. During his trial, a forensic psychologist testified that Grayson has bipolar disorder, and he was experiencing a "manic state" during the murder. However, the psychologist also emphasized that Grayson was still able to distinguish between right and wrong at the time, and his actions could not be excused solely due to his mental health condition.

Grayson was convicted four days later on February 2, 1996, and another six days later, on February 8, the jury deliberated for 15 minutes before they unanimously returned with the recommendation of a death sentence. The prosecution later sought to have all four youths face the death penalty, and highlighted that the brutality of the crime and gruesomeness of Deblieux's death made it deserving for all four be executed. A sentencing trial for all four accused was scheduled to take place on March 8, 1996.

On March 8, 1996, Circuit Judge Mike McCormick followed the jury's recommendations in the four accused's respective cases. He spared Mangione the death sentence and ordered that he be jailed for life without the possibility of parole while sentencing the remaining three accused to death.

== Appeals of the four ==
In 1998, Louis Mangione's appeal against his conviction and sentence was dismissed by the Court of Criminal Appeals of Alabama.

In 1999, Grayson was one of the five condemned to lose their appeals to the Court of Criminal Appeals of Alabama. Duncan also lost his appeal in 1999 to the Court of Criminal Appeals of Alabama.

In 1999, the Court of Criminal Appeals of Alabama also rejected the appeal of Loggins. In 2000, Loggins lost his second appeal to the Alabama Supreme Court.

In 2001, the Alabama Supreme Court once again upheld and therefore finalized the death sentences of the condemned trio (Grayson, Duncan, and Loggins) after dismissing their appeals.

== Commutation of Loggins's and Duncan's death sentences ==
In 2005, after the U.S. Supreme Court heard the Roper v. Simmons case, a majority ruling of 5 to 4 formally decreed that it was unconstitutional to execute offenders who were below 18 at the time of their crimes. This ruling made an impact on many cases of juveniles on death row, including Loggins and Duncan, and they were allowed to apply for a reduction of their death sentences to life imprisonment, given that both of them were minors at the time of the murder.

In April 2005, Duncan's death sentence was commuted to life in jail without any chance for parole. (Note: Duncan was born on November 15, 1976, which made him 17 years and three months old at the time of the murder.)

On January 28, 2006, an Alabama state court allowed the re-sentencing plea of Loggins and commuted his death sentence to life without parole. Loggins was the 13th juvenile on death row to have his sentence reduced since 2005. (Note: Loggins was born on September 15, 1976, which made him 17 years and five months old at the time of the murder.)

== Further appeals of the juveniles ==
Five years after his re-sentencing, Kenneth Loggins filed an appeal in 2011 for a further reduction of his life sentence, stating that sentencing minors to life without parole was unconstitutional, but it was dismissed.

Eventually, in 2012, Alabama revised its life imprisonment laws for juveniles through the landmark ruling of Miller v. Alabama, making it unconstitutional for juveniles to serve mandatory life sentences without parole and the new laws allowed judges to decide whether or not to grant juveniles serving life sentences the possibility of parole, including the past court cases prior to 2012. Many of the juveniles serving life without parole, including Loggins, Duncan and Mangione, applied for their life terms to carry the possibility of release on parole.

After a series of re-sentencing hearings, both Mangione and Duncan were granted the chance for parole after a minimum of 35 years and their earliest parole hearings would take place in 2029. However, Loggins, whose hearing took place in 2018, was denied the chance of parole and hence, his sentence of life without parole was maintained by the courts.

== Fate of Carey Dale Grayson ==
Carey Dale Grayson
- Undated mugshot of Grayson
- Born: August 31, 1974; Alabama, U.S.
- Died: November 21, 2024 (aged 50); Holman Correctional Facility, Alabama, U.S.
- Cause of death: Execution by nitrogen hypoxia
- Status: Executed
- Conviction: Capital murder
- Penalty: Death
- Accomplices: Kenneth Loggins, 17; Trace Royal Duncan, 17; Louis Christopher Mangione, 16

Details
- Victims: Vickie Deblieux, 37
- Date: February 21–22, 1994
- Country: U.S.
- State: Alabama

The re-sentencing of both Duncan and Loggins left Grayson, who was 19 at the time of the murder, the only convict of the case to remain on death row for murdering Vickie Deblieux. Grayson spent more than 28 years on death row before he was executed in 2024.

=== Further appeal processes ===
After exhausting all avenues of appeal in the state appeal process in 2006, Grayson brought forward his case to federal court and filed a plea of habeas corpus in the Northern District of Alabama, but the motion was rejected in September 2009. A year later, in October 2010, the 11th Circuit Court of Appeals rejected Grayson's appeal, and another year later, the U.S. Supreme Court ultimately dismissed Grayson's final appeal and confirmed his death sentence.

Originally, Grayson was scheduled to be put to death by lethal injection on April 12, 2012, but his execution was postponed by the Alabama Supreme Court after his lawyers appealed to challenge the change of drug use in the lethal injection protocols of Alabama. In 2015, Grayson was one of five death row prisoners who filed a lawsuit opposing the state authorities' bid to administer large doses of midazolam in lethal injection executions.

=== 2024 death warrant ===
While Grayson was still incarcerated on death row, the laws of Alabama allowed the state to carry out executions by either lethal injection or nitrogen gas inhalation as early as 2018, making it possible for Grayson to choose either method to facilitate his impending execution, for which a date had yet to be set.

In June 2024, five months after Alabama's first nitrogen gas execution, a motion by the attorney general's office was filed to seek approval of Grayson's second death warrant; the representatives of the state asked for Grayson's execution to be carried out with nitrogen gas, which was the third time where Alabama would possibly carry out an execution by nitrogen hypoxia. Grayson had reportedly elected to be executed by nitrogen gas inhalation in 2018, based on court documents presented in the hearing. However, there were lingering concerns over the effectiveness of the nitrogen gas execution, as it was reported that the first person put to death via this method had convulsed in "seizure-like spasms" and gasped for breath minutes before falling motionless, although government officials defended this method by stating there were no major problems arising from this method and it was "textbook".

On August 15, 2024, the Alabama Supreme Court approved the death warrant for Grayson, and a court order was issued for the Alabama Governor Kay Ivey to authorize his death warrant.

Five days after the Supreme Court approved Grayson's death warrant, his death sentence was scheduled to be carried out via nitrogen hypoxia on November 21, 2024, making him the third person in Alabama to face a nitrogen gas execution after Kenneth Eugene Smith on January 25 and Alan Eugene Miller on September 26. A 30-hour time window was set between midnight of November 21, 2024, and 6:00 a.m. of November 22, 2024, for the execution to be carried out.

=== Final appeals ===
Days after the death warrant was issued, Grayson's lawyers filed a legal motion and sought to stave off the impending execution, citing that Grayson should not be put to death by nitrogen gas due to potential problems with the new execution method, noting that there were witness statements that Kenneth Eugene Smith, the first convicted killer executed with this method in Alabama, had allegedly experienced seizure-like spasms, and this could amount to cruel and unusual punishment since it did not guarantee a painless death for Grayson.

On October 9, 2024, it was reported that Grayson's lawyers proposed amendments to the nitrogen gas execution protocols to ensure that his death sentence would be carried out smoothly. They also requested that the execution not be conducted via nitrogen hypoxia.

On November 6, 2024, U.S. District Judge R. Austin Huffaker Jr. of the U.S. District Court for the Middle District of Alabama rejected Grayson's appeal to cancel his scheduled execution.

Subsequently, Grayson made a follow-up appeal to the 11th U.S. Court of Appeals against the decision of Huffaker. On November 18, 2024, the appellate court dismissed Grayson's appeal and upheld the ruling of Huffaker.

Grayson's final avenues of appeal were an appeal to the U.S. Supreme Court and a clemency petition to the Alabama Governor Kay Ivey. On November 21, 2024, hours before Grayson was set to be executed, the U.S. Supreme Court rejected his final appeal and allowed the execution to move forward as scheduled.

When inquired about Grayson's execution, which was scheduled a week before Thanksgiving, Ivey replied, "Did Carey Grayson give any consideration to the fact that he robbed Vicki DeBlieux and her family of now 30 Thanksgivings?"

=== Response of Deblieux's family ===
During the final week before the execution of Grayson, Vickie Deblieux's half-brother, Mike Deblieux, agreed to be interviewed about the murder of his sister. Mike stated that he had few memories of his sister, but he found it terrible that she died in such a horrific manner and believed that all the four murderers should be sentenced to death, although he understood that the death penalty did not apply to Mangione, Duncan and Loggins since they were minors.

On the other hand, Deblieux's daughter, Jodi Haley, who opposed the death penalty, did not agree with the execution. Haley noted that Grayson had been abused in his youth and said that "society failed this man as a child, and my family suffered because of it." She added, "Murdering inmates under the guise of justice needs to stop. No one should have the right to take a person's possibilities, days, and life."

=== Execution ===
50-year-old Grayson was executed via nitrogen gas inhalation at the Holman Correctional Facility on the evening of November 21, 2024. He was pronounced dead at 6:33 p.m.

Grayson was the third inmate in the U.S. to be executed with nitrogen gas. As of November 2024, Grayson was the 22nd person executed in the United States that year.

For his final meal, Grayson ordered soft tacos, beef burritos, a tostada, chips and guacamole, and a Mountain Dew Baja Blast, all of which were ordered from local restaurants. When asked by the warden if he had any last words Grayson said "You need to fuck off", and raised both middle fingers.

According to witnesses and official sources, the nitrogen began to flow at 6:12 p.m., and Grayson moved his head, shook, and tugged at the restraints on the gurney. He clenched his fist and seemed to make an effort to gesture once more. His legs, covered in a sheet, lifted off the gurney at 6:14 p.m. For several minutes, he gasped for air in a series of more than a dozen breaths. At 6:21 p.m., Grayson stopped breathing, and the curtains to the viewing room were drawn at 6:27 p.m., six minutes before Grayson was declared dead.

Ivey released a media statement soon after the execution of Grayson, and she said that the life of 37-year-old Vickie Deblieux was "horrifically cut short" by Grayson and his accomplices, and described the criminal conduct of Grayson as "heinous, unimaginable, without an ounce of regard for human life and just unexplainably mean", which made him deserving of the death penalty. Governor Ivey also added that the death of Grayson by nitrogen hypoxia bore no comparison to the violent death and dismemberment of Deblieux, and offered her condolences to the victim's surviving kin, hoping they could find closure and healing with Grayson's execution.

Alabama attorney general Steve Marshall similarly announced that the death penalty was justified in Grayson's case when he conducted a press conference shortly after the execution of Grayson. He stated that justice had been served in this case and expressed hope that the remaining family members of Deblieux could find solace in the state's efforts in finalizing the course of justice for their "heartbreaking loss".

== See also ==
- Capital punishment in Alabama
- List of people executed in Alabama
- List of people executed in the United States in 2024
- List of solved missing person cases: 1990s

Executions by nitrogen hypoxia in the United States
Preceded by Alan Eugene Miller – Alabama September 26, 2024	Carey Dale Grayson – Alabama; November 21, 2024	Succeeded by Demetrius Terrence Frazier – Alabama February 6, 2025
Executions carried out in Alabama
Preceded by Derrick Ryan Dearman October 17, 2024	Carey Dale Grayson; November 21, 2024	Succeeded by Demetrius Terrence Frazier February 6, 2025
Executions carried out in the United States
Preceded by Richard Bernard Moore – South Carolina November 1, 2024	Carey Dale Grayson – Alabama; November 21, 2024	Succeeded by Christopher Leroy Collings – Missouri December 3, 2024
