= List of people executed in Alabama =

The following is a list of people executed by the U.S. state of Alabama since capital punishment was resumed in the United States in 1976. All of the 86 people (85 men and 1 woman) have been executed at the Holman Correctional Facility, near Atmore, Alabama. All executions between December 2002 and 2023 were conducted by lethal injection. In January 2024, the Alabama Department of Corrections conducted the first ever execution via nitrogen hypoxia.

Prior to 1983, an 18-year moratorium on executions was observed under the direction of the Supreme Court of the United States. Alabama previously executed 153 people between 1927 and 1965.

== List of people executed in Alabama since 1976 ==
No.	Name	Race	Age	Sex	Date of execution	County	Method	Victim(s)	Governor
1	John Louis Evans III	White	33	M	April 22, 1983	Mobile	Electrocution	Edward Nassar	George Wallace
2	Arthur Lee Jones	Black	47	M	March 21, 1986	Mobile	Electrocution	William Hosea Waymon and Vaughn Thompson	George Wallace
3	Wayne Eugene Ritter (Note: Ritter was the accomplice of John Louis Evans.)	White	33	M	August 28, 1987	Mobile	Electrocution	Edward Nassar	H. Guy Hunt
4	Michael Lindsey	Black	28	M	May 26, 1989	Mobile	Electrocution	Rosemary Zimlich Rutland	H. Guy Hunt
5	Horace Franklin Dunkins Jr.	Black	28	M	July 14, 1989	Jefferson	Electrocution	Lynn McCurry	H. Guy Hunt
6	Herbert Lee Richardson	Black	43	M	August 18, 1989	Houston	Electrocution	Rena Mae Callins	H. Guy Hunt
7	Arthur James Julius	Black	43	M	November 17, 1989	Montgomery	Electrocution	Susie Bell Sanders	H. Guy Hunt
8	Wallace Norrell Thomas	Black	35	M	July 13, 1990	Jefferson	Electrocution	Quenette Shehane	H. Guy Hunt
9	Larry Gene Heath	White	40	M	March 20, 1992	Russell	Electrocution	Rebecca Heath	H. Guy Hunt
10	Cornelius Singleton	Black	36	M	November 20, 1992	Mobile	Electrocution	Ann Hogan	H. Guy Hunt
11	Willie Clisby Jr.	Black	47	M	April 28, 1995	Jefferson	Electrocution	Fletcher Handley	Fob James
12	Varnell Weeks	Black	43	M	May 12, 1995	Macon	Electrocution	Mark Batts	Fob James
13	Edward Dean Horsley Jr. (Note: Horsley was the accomplice of Brian Baldwin.)	Black	38	M	February 16, 1996	Monroe	Electrocution	Naomi Rolon	Fob James
14	Billy Wayne Waldrop	White	44	M	January 10, 1997	Talladega	Electrocution	Thurman Macon Donahoo (Note: Also killed J. R. Carter and Clarence Ralph Snider, but was executed for killing Donahoo.)	Fob James
15	Walter Hill	Black	62	M	May 2, 1997	Jefferson	Electrocution	Willie Mae Hammock, John Tatum Jr., and Lois Jean Tatum.	Fob James
16	Henry Francis Hays	White	42	M	June 6, 1997	Mobile	Electrocution	Michael Donald	Fob James
17	Steven Allen Thompson	White	34	M	May 8, 1998	Madison	Electrocution	Robin Balarzs	Fob James
18	Brian Keith Baldwin	Black	40	M	June 18, 1999	Monroe	Electrocution	Naomi Rolon	Don Siegelman
19	Victor Kennedy	Black	37	M	August 6, 1999	Shelby	Electrocution	Annie Laura Orr	Don Siegelman
20	David Ray Duren	White	37	M	January 7, 2000	Jefferson	Electrocution	Kathleen Bedsole	Don Siegelman
21	Freddie Lee Wright	Black	48	M	March 3, 2000	Mobile	Electrocution	Warren Green and Lois Green	Don Siegelman
22	Robert Lee Tarver Jr.	Black	52	M	April 14, 2000	Russell	Electrocution	Hugh Sims Kite	Don Siegelman
23	Pernell La'sha Ford	Black	35	M	June 2, 2000	Calhoun	Electrocution	Willie C. Griffith and Linda Gail Griffith	Don Siegelman
24	Lynda Cheryle Lyon Block	White	54	F	May 10, 2002	Lee	Electrocution	Opelika police Sergeant Roger Lamar Motley	Don Siegelman
25	Anthony Keith Johnson	White	46	M	December 12, 2002	Morgan	Lethal injection	Kenneth Cantrell	Don Siegelman
26	Michael Eugene Thompson	White	43	M	March 13, 2003	Blount	Lethal injection	Maisie Carlene Gray	Bob Riley
27	Gary Leon Brown	White	44	M	April 24, 2003	Jefferson	Lethal injection	Jack David McGraw	Bob Riley
28	Thomas Jerry Fortenberry	White	39	M	August 7, 2003	Etowah	Lethal injection	4 murder victims (Note: The 4 victims were: Ronald Michael Guest, Wilbut T. Nelson, Robert William Payne, and Nancy Payne.)	Bob Riley
29	James Barney Hubbard	White	74	M	August 5, 2004	Tuscaloosa	Lethal injection	Lillian Montgomery (Note: Also killed David Dockery, but was executed for killing Montgomery.)	Bob Riley
30	David Kevin Hocker	White	33	M	September 30, 2004	Henry	Lethal injection	Jerry Wayne Robinson	Bob Riley
31	Mario Giovanni Centobie	White	39	M	April 28, 2005	St. Clair	Lethal injection	Moody police officer Keith Turner	Bob Riley
32	Jerry Paul Henderson	White	58	M	June 2, 2005	Talladega	Lethal injection	Jerry Haney	Bob Riley
33	George Everette Sibley Jr. (Note: Sibley was the common-law husband and accomplice of Lynda Lyon Block.)	White	62	M	August 4, 2005	Lee	Lethal injection	Opelika police Sergeant Roger Lamar Motley	Bob Riley
34	John W. Peoples Jr.	White	48	M	September 22, 2005	Talladega	Lethal injection	Paul Franklin, Judy Franklin, and Paul Franklin Jr.	Bob Riley
35	Larry Eugene Hutcherson	White	37	M	October 26, 2006	Mobile	Lethal injection	Irma Thelma Gray	Bob Riley
36	Aaron Lee Jones	Black	55	M	May 3, 2007	Blount	Lethal injection	Carl Nelson and Willene Nelson	Bob Riley
37	Darrell B. Grayson	Black	46	M	July 26, 2007	Shelby	Lethal injection	Annie Laura Orr	Bob Riley
38	Luther Jerome Williams	Black	47	M	August 23, 2007	Tuscaloosa	Lethal injection	John Kirk	Bob Riley
39	James Harvey Callahan	White	62	M	January 15, 2009	Calhoun	Lethal injection	Rebecca Suzanne Howell	Bob Riley
40	Danny Joe Bradley	White	49	M	February 12, 2009	Calhoun	Lethal injection	Rhonda Hardin	Bob Riley
41	Jimmy Lee Dill	Black	49	M	April 16, 2009	Jefferson	Lethal injection	Leon Shaw	Bob Riley
42	Willie McNair	Black	44	M	May 14, 2009	Montgomery	Lethal injection	Ella Foy Riley	Bob Riley
43	Jack Harrison Trawick	White	62	M	June 11, 2009	Jefferson	Lethal injection	Stephanie Alexis Gach (Note: Also killed Betty Jo Richards and Frances Aileen Pruitt, but was executed for killing Gach.)	Bob Riley
44	Max Landon Payne	White	38	M	October 8, 2009	Cullman	Lethal injection	Braxton Brown	Bob Riley
45	Thomas Warren Whisenhant	White	63	M	May 27, 2010	Mobile	Lethal injection	4 murder victims (Note: The 4 victims were: Lexie Haynes, Patricia Hitt, Venora Hyatt, and Cheryl Lynn Payton. Whisenhant was executed for killing Payton.)	Bob Riley
46	John Forrest Parker (Note: Parker was the accomplice of Kenneth Eugene Smith, who was executed 14 years later for the same crime.)	White	42	M	June 10, 2010	Colbert	Lethal injection	Elizabeth Dorlene Sennett	Bob Riley
47	Michael Jeffrey Land	White	41	M	August 12, 2010	Jefferson	Lethal injection	Candace Brown	Bob Riley
48	Holly Wood	Black	50	M	September 9, 2010	Dale	Lethal injection	Ruby Lois Gosha	Bob Riley
49	Phillip D. Hallford	White	63	M	November 4, 2010	Pike	Lethal injection	Charles Eddie Shannon	Bob Riley
50	Leroy B. White	Black	52	M	January 13, 2011	Madison	Lethal injection	Ruby White	Bob Riley
51	William Glenn Boyd	White	45	M	March 31, 2011	Calhoun	Lethal injection	Fred Blackmon and Evelyn Blackmon	Robert J. Bentley
52	Jason Oric Williams	White	43	M	May 19, 2011	Mobile	Lethal injection	4 murder victims (Note: The 4 victims were: Gerald Paravicini, Fred Barber, Linda Barber, and Bryan Barber.)	Robert J. Bentley
53	Eddie Duval Powell III	Black	41	M	June 16, 2011	Tuscaloosa	Lethal injection	Mattie Wesson	Robert J. Bentley
54	Derrick O'Neal Mason	Black	37	M	September 22, 2011	Madison	Lethal injection	Angela Cagle	Robert J. Bentley
55	Christopher Thomas Johnson	White	38	M	October 20, 2011	Escambia	Lethal injection	Elias Ocean Johnson	Robert J. Bentley
56	Andrew Reid Lackey	White	29	M	July 25, 2013	Limestone	Lethal injection	Charlie Newman	Robert J. Bentley
57	Christopher Eugene Brooks	White	43	M	January 21, 2016	Jefferson	Lethal injection	Jo Deann Campbell	Robert J. Bentley
58	Ronald Bert Smith Jr.	White	45	M	December 8, 2016	Madison	Lethal injection	Casey Wilson	Robert J. Bentley
59	Thomas Douglas Arthur	White	75	M	May 26, 2017	Colbert	Lethal injection	Troy Wicker	Kay Ivey
60	Robert Bryant Melson	Black	46	M	June 8, 2017	Etowah	Lethal injection	James Nathaniel Baker, Darryl Collier, and Tamika Collins	Kay Ivey
61	Torrey Twane McNabb	Black	40	M	October 19, 2017	Montgomery	Lethal injection	Montgomery police officer Anderson Gordon	Kay Ivey
62	Michael Wayne Eggers	White	50	M	March 15, 2018	Walker	Lethal injection	Bennie Francis Murray	Kay Ivey
63	Walter Leroy Moody Jr.	White	83	M	April 19, 2018	Jefferson	Lethal injection	Judge Robert Smith Vance (Note: Also killed Robert Edward Robinson in Georgia, but was executed for killing Vance.)	Kay Ivey
64	Domineque Hakim Marcelle Ray	Black	42	M	February 7, 2019	Dallas	Lethal injection	Tiffany Harville (Note: Also killed Reinhard Mabins and Earnest Mabins, but was executed for killing Harville.)	Kay Ivey
65	Michael Brandon Samra	White	41	M	May 16, 2019	Shelby	Lethal injection	4 murder victims (Note: The 4 victims were: Randy Duke, Dedra Hunt, Chelsea Hunt, and Chelisa Hunt.)	Kay Ivey
66	Christopher Lee Price	White	46	M	May 30, 2019	Fayette	Lethal injection	Bill Lynn	Kay Ivey
67	Nathaniel Woods	Black	43	M	March 5, 2020	Jefferson	Lethal injection	Carlos Owen, Harley Chisholm III, and Charles Bennett (Note: All 3 victims were Birmingham police officers.)	Kay Ivey
68	Willie B. Smith III	Black	52	M	October 21, 2021	Jefferson	Lethal injection	Sharma Ruth Johnson	Kay Ivey
69	Matthew Reeves	Black	44	M	January 27, 2022	Dallas	Lethal injection	Willie Johnson Jr.	Kay Ivey
70	Joe Nathan James Jr.	Black	50	M	July 28, 2022	Jefferson	Lethal injection	Faith Hall	Kay Ivey
71	James Edward Barber	White	64	M	July 21, 2023	Madison	Lethal injection	Dorothy Belle Epps	Kay Ivey
72	Casey Allen McWhorter	White	49	M	November 16, 2023	Marshall	Lethal injection	Edward Lee Williams Sr.	Kay Ivey
73	Kenneth Eugene Smith (Note: Smith was the first person to be executed by nitrogen hypoxia in Alabama's legal history, and in turn, the United States and worldwide.)	White	58	M	January 25, 2024	Colbert	Nitrogen hypoxia	Elizabeth Dorlene Sennett	Kay Ivey
74	Jamie Ray Mills	White	50	M	May 30, 2024	Marion	Lethal injection	Floyd Hill and Vera Hill	Kay Ivey
75	Keith Edmund Gavin	Black	64	M	July 18, 2024	Cherokee	Lethal injection	William Clinton Clayton Jr. (Note: Also killed Reginald Allen in Illinois, but was executed for killing Clayton.)	Kay Ivey
76	Alan Eugene Miller	White	59	M	September 26, 2024	Shelby	Nitrogen hypoxia	Lee Michael Holdbrooks, Christopher Scott Yancy, and Terry Lee Jarvis	Kay Ivey
77	Derrick Ryan Dearman	White	36	M	October 17, 2024	Mobile	Lethal injection	5 murder victims (Note: The 5 victims were: Joseph Adam Turner, Shannon Melissa Randall, Robert Lee Brown, Justin Kaleb Reed, and Chelsea Marie Reed.)	Kay Ivey
78	Carey Dale Grayson	White	50	M	November 21, 2024	Jefferson	Nitrogen hypoxia	Vickie Lynn Deblieux	Kay Ivey
79	Demetrius Terrence Frazier	Black	52	M	February 6, 2025	Jefferson	Nitrogen hypoxia	Pauline Starks Brown (Note: Also killed Crystal Kendrick in Michigan, but was executed for killing Brown.)	Kay Ivey
80	James Lee Osgood	White	55	M	April 24, 2025	Chilton	Lethal injection	Tracy Lynn Brown	Kay Ivey
81	Gregory Hunt	White	65	M	June 10, 2025	Walker	Nitrogen hypoxia	Karen Sanders Lane	Kay Ivey
82	Geoffrey Todd West	White	50	M	September 25, 2025	Etowah	Nitrogen hypoxia	Margaret Parrish Berry	Kay Ivey
83	Anthony Todd Boyd	Black	54	M	October 23, 2025	Talladega	Nitrogen hypoxia	Gregory Huguley	Kay Ivey
84	Jeremy Tremaine Williams	Black	42	M	August 13, 2026	Russell	Lethal injection	Kamarie Holland	Kay Ivey
85	Jeffery James Lee	Black	49	M	September 17, 2026	Dallas	Lethal injection	James Hodges Ellis and Elaine Thompson	Kay Ivey
86	Michael Shannon Taylor	White	54	M	November 5, 2026	Etowah	Lethal injection	Ivan Ernest Moore and Lucille Moore	Kay Ivey

== Demographics ==
Race
White	49	57%
Black	37	43%
Age
20–29	3	3%
30–39	17	20%
40–49	36	42%
50–59	18	21%
60–69	9	10%
70–79	2	2%
80–89	1	1%
Sex
Male	85	99%
Female	1	1%
Date of execution
1976–1979	0	0%
1980–1989	7	8%
1990–1999	12	14%
2000–2009	25	29%
2010–2019	22	26%
2020–2029	20	23%
Method
Lethal injection	55	64%
Electrocution	24	28%
Nitrogen hypoxia	7	8%
Governor (Party)
George Wallace (D)	2	2%
H. Guy Hunt (R)	8	9%
Jim Folsom Jr. (D)	0	0%
Fob James (R)	7	8%
Don Siegelman (D)	8	9%
Bob Riley (R)	25	29%
Robert J. Bentley (R)	8	9%
Kay Ivey (R)	28	33%
Total	86	100%

== See also ==
- Capital punishment in Alabama
- Capital punishment in the United States
- List of people executed in Alabama (pre-1972) – executions before Furman
