= Execution of Kenneth Eugene Smith =

First execution via nitrogen hypoxia

Kenneth Eugene Smith
- Smith in an undated prison photograph
- Born: July 4, 1965; Alabama, U.S.
- Died: January 25, 2024 (aged 58); Holman Correctional Facility, Alabama, U.S.
- Known for: First execution conducted by nitrogen hypoxia
- Status: Executed by nitrogen hypoxia
- Conviction: Capital murder
- Penalty: Death (c. 1996)

Details
- Victims: 1
- Date: March 18, 1988
- Imprisoned at: Holman Correctional Facility

The execution of Kenneth Eugene Smith (July 4, 1965 – January 25, 2024) took place in the U.S. state of Alabama. He was the first person to be executed by nitrogen hypoxia.

On March 18, 1988, Smith was convicted of the contract killing of Elizabeth Sennett in Colbert County, Alabama. Charles Sennett Sr., Elizabeth's husband, recruited Billy Gray Williams to murder his wife. Williams in turn recruited Smith and John Forrest Parker to assist in the murder. Smith and Parker attempted to carry out the murder, beating and stabbing Elizabeth Sennett unconscious at her home in Colbert County. However, it is believed and concluded by Alabama Police that Charles Sennett killed his wife by stabbing her after returning home and seeing her body before calling police. A week after Elizabeth's murder, Charles Sennett killed himself when he learned he was a suspect in the murder. Billy Gray Williams was sentenced to life imprisonment without the possibility of parole and died in prison in November 2020. Smith and John Forrest Parker were both sentenced to death. Parker was executed via lethal injection on June 10, 2010.

In November 2022, Smith was scheduled to be executed by lethal injection, but the execution was stayed after the execution team was unable to connect the intravenous lines to Smith in the time available before the expiration of the death warrant issued by the Alabama Supreme Court. As part of a settlement between the state and Smith, the state agreed not to pursue Smith's execution by lethal injection (the default primary method of execution in Alabama), which was Smith's method of execution since he didn't select a secondary execution method (electrocution or nitrogen hypoxia), and instead allow him to choose nitrogen hypoxia, a novel method of execution at the time. After losing his final appeal to the Supreme Court of the United States, Smith was ultimately executed by nitrogen hypoxia on January 25, 2024, becoming the first person to be executed by that method.

== Crime and investigation ==
The Reverend Charles Sennett Sr. hired Billy Gray Williams, one of his tenants, to murder his wife, 45-year-old Elizabeth Dorlene Sennett. To carry out the plan, Williams hired Kenneth Smith and John Forrest Parker to assist him. Sennett was going to pay each of the men $1,000 for the murder (equivalent to $2,700 in 2025).

On March 18, 1988, Elizabeth Sennett was found with fatal injuries in her home in Colbert County, Alabama. Earlier, Smith and Parker arrived at the Sennetts' home and told Elizabeth that Charles had allowed them to survey the grounds for hunting purposes. Elizabeth called Charles who told her to let the two men in. Charles had provided the men with funds to buy a firearm to kill Elizabeth. However, Smith and Parker opted to spend the money on drugs. Instead of a firearm, they used a six-inch survival knife and various items within the home to murder her. While the men were walking around the grounds, Elizabeth stayed inside. The two men then knocked on the door and asked to use the bathroom, which Elizabeth agreed to. While Parker was in the bathroom, Smith crept up on Elizabeth and decided to beat her. As Elizabeth struggled for her life; a "fireplace set, a walking cane, and a piece of galvanized pipe" were used to beat her. Parker also later joined Smith in beating her. After Elizabeth was beaten, she was then stabbed eight times with the survival knife, which caused her death.

Sheriff Ronnie May was one of the first people to arrive on the scene and he was unable to find a pulse for Elizabeth; however, when emergency medical technicians arrived, they found a pulse. May stated that Charles Sennett "almost fell" when he was told that Elizabeth had a pulse. May then rode with Elizabeth in the ambulance and she was declared dead by doctors at the hospital. May said that Sennett "fought it and she fought hard."

Investigators thought that the home looked staged to make it appear that there had been a home invasion; the men took a videocassette recorder and a stereo. May remembered meeting Charles Sennett a few weeks prior to the incident when they were investigating another murder and had to ask Sennett to leave several times. Investigators received a call from Crime Stoppers that gave them the suspects' names. On March 25, investigators brought Sennett in for questioning, but he denied involvement. When Sennett went to leave, someone asked if Sennett knew Kenneth Smith and Sennett turned red. Sennett left the interview and went to his church, where he met with his sons and their families and admitted to having an affair and having their mother killed. Sennett then went to the parking lot, got in his truck, and fatally shot himself.

Investigators received a search warrant to search Smith's home and found a video recorder from the Sennetts' home. Smith and Parker provided information to the police about Elizabeth's death.

== Sentencing and appeals ==
Smith was tried and convicted in Jefferson County on a change of venue from Colbert County to reduce pre-trial publicity. The jury in Smith's first trial found Smith guilty of the murder of Elizabeth Dorlene Sennett and recommended to the trial judge that he be executed by a vote of 10–2. For inmates convicted before 2017, the jury issued a sentencing recommendation; if fewer than 10 jurors vote for a death sentence then that constitutes a life sentence. The judge, however, is not bound by the jury's recommendation, but gives it weight before making the ultimate sentencing decision. Smith was sentenced to death in 1989; however, the conviction and sentence were vacated on appeal in 1992. In Smith's second trial, the jury in Smith's case recommended a life sentence by a 11–1 vote; the judge overruled their recommendation and sentenced him to death in 1996.

Parker was also sentenced to death and Williams was sentenced to life imprisonment without the possibility of parole. Parker was executed on June 10, 2010, via lethal injection. Williams died in prison in November 2020 from an undisclosed illness. By November 2022, Smith exhausted all avenues of appeal regarding the second conviction and sentence.

== First death warrant and failed execution attempt ==
Smith was initially scheduled to be executed by lethal injection on November 17, 2022.

Despite the fact that Smith had a motion to stay his execution pending before the U.S. Court of Appeals for the Eleventh Circuit, at 7:45 p.m. on November 17, 2022, a lawyer for the Alabama Department of Corrections emailed Smith's lawyers to let them know they were preparing him for execution. Smith spoke with his wife, and at 7:57 p.m. prison guards ended his phone call with her. Smith was handcuffed and shackled and taken to the execution chamber. Two minutes later, at 7:59 p.m. the Eleventh Circuit issued a stay of execution, which Smith's lawyers immediately provided to the Alabama Department of Corrections.

The Department of Corrections replied that they had received notice of the stay, but did not inform Smith or allow him to speak with his lawyers, instead keeping him strapped to a gurney in the execution chamber. At 10:00 p.m. the execution team entered and attempted to place an IV into Smith's arm. At approximately 10:20 p.m. the United States Supreme Court lifted the Eleventh Circuit's stay of execution. Smith told a member of the execution team that they were inserting the needle into his muscle, but the team member told him that was not true. The team then moved Smith into an inverted crucifixion position and left the room, returning after a few minutes to inject him with an unknown substance, despite Smith's objection. Another individual began repeatedly stabbing Smith's collarbone with a needle, attempting to place a central IV line. The results were unsuccessful and at approximately 11:20 p.m. Smith's execution was called off. Smith was unable to walk or lift his arms on his own, and was sweating and hyperventilating. This marked the third consecutive botched execution by the state of Alabama.

Following the incident, Alabama governor Kay Ivey ordered a review of Alabama's execution process. Governor Ivey also asked the Alabama Supreme Court to amend state court rules governing death warrants to allow Department of Corrections personnel additional time to carry out executions. The Alabama Supreme Court approved the amendment on January 12, 2023.

== Second death warrant and execution ==
On August 29, 2023, Attorney General Steve Marshall filed a petition to the Alabama Supreme Court seeking a second execution date for Smith, but instead of lethal injection, the petition asked that Smith be put to death by nitrogen hypoxia, an untested method which had never been used in any execution in the world. The court authorized the setting of an execution date on November 3, and on November 8, Alabama governor Kay Ivey ordered that Smith be put to death on January 25, 2024, by nitrogen hypoxia. On January 10, 2024, a federal judge ruled that Alabama could proceed with the execution of Smith using nitrogen gas. On January 24, 2024, the Supreme Court refused to hear his appeal and denied his request for a stay of execution. On the other hand, rights groups and the United Nations were concerned that the never-used method of nitrogen gas execution might lead to "cruel, inhuman or degrading treatment or even torture", and Smith's lawyers earlier argued in the failed Supreme Court appeal that it was unconstitutional to conduct a second execution attempt on Smith after he survived the first.

On January 25, Smith's final appeal to stave off his execution was once again rejected by the Supreme Court, and his death sentence was scheduled to be carried out on the same evening at 6 p.m. CST. Chuck Sennett, one of the victim's two sons, stated in response that Smith should pay the price for killing his mother, whom he felt was overlooked in light of the planned execution method of nitrogen hypoxia. Governor Ivey had earlier declined to grant Smith clemency, which would have commuted Smith's death sentence to life imprisonment.

Smith ate his last meal—steak, hash browns, and eggs—eight hours before he was put to death, and he received a final visit from his wife and sons. Smith's spiritual advisor, Reverend Jeff Hood, told the Associated Press that Smith was at peace despite his fear of the risks of execution by nitrogen hypoxia, and accepted his imminent fate.

Smith was strapped to a gurney wearing a full-face mask. His last words were said to be, "Tonight, Alabama causes humanity to take a step backwards. Thank you for supporting me. Love all of you." The nitrogen gas was administered beginning at 7:57 p.m. Some witnesses commented that Smith looked as if he was conscious for several minutes and "thrashed violently on the gurney", breathing heavily for several minutes before his breathing was no longer visible. Smith appeared to lose consciousness at 8:02 p.m. It appeared death occurred when movement of Smith ceased at 8:08 p.m. The curtain to the witness room closed at 8:15 p.m. He was pronounced dead at 8:25 p.m.

Alabama Corrections commissioner John Q. Hamm told the media that the alleged sightings of Smith's convulsion and shaking appeared to be involuntary movements, and these effects were expected based on the research made on nitrogen hypoxia. Hamm also claimed Smith held his breath for approximately four minutes which led to a stronger response from Smith's body. Alabama attorney general Steve Marshall also backed the claim and stated that this proved that the death penalty by nitrogen gas was an "effective and humane method of execution". Ivey also said in a media conference that justice had been served and hoped that Sennett's family could find closure after Smith's execution.

In a statement after Smith's execution, one of Sennett's two sons, Michael Sennett, stated that justice had been served for his mother and that Smith deserved to face the consequences for his crime. He added that although his mother cannot be brought back to life with Smith's death, he was glad that the ordeal was finally over after more than three decades since his mother was killed, and the family had long forgiven Smith and all the other perpetrators involved. Smith's remains were subsequently released to the Escambia County Coroner for an autopsy at the Mobile Laboratory of the Department of Forensic Sciences.

== Aftermath ==
An autopsy of Smith's body was conducted by the Alabama Department of Forensic Sciences. The autopsy showed Smith exhibited signs of negative-pressure pulmonary edema, had "dark maroon blood" and fluid present in his lungs along with "marked congestion", and had "frothy fluid" in his trachea. Another death row inmate scheduled to die by nitrogen hypoxia in Alabama in November 2024, Carey Dale Grayson, hired an expert to analyze Smith's autopsy results in August 2024. After a review, the expert called the results "highly concerning." Brian McAlary, an anesthesiologist, wrote in an argument on Grayson's behalf that Smith likely panicked due to an automatic response to the inability to breathe oxygen and that Smith's panic may have been avoided if he had been given a sedative prior to his execution. A second expert, Thomas Andrew, the chief medical examiner of New Hampshire, agreed that Smith should have been sedated before his execution because nitrogen hypoxia introduces "a sense of the absence of oxygen, air hunger, and all of the panic and discomfort that is part and parcel of that way of dying."

Volker Türk, the United Nations high commissioner for human rights, condemned Alabama's use of nitrogen gas to administer Smith's death penalty and stated that the method had amounted to a potential form of torture and degrading punishment.

After Smith's execution, several other states became open to the possibility of legally carrying out nitrogen gas executions. Lawmakers from Ohio, where a moratorium had been in effect since the state's last execution in 2018, considered whether to legalize nitrogen gas as a new method of execution aside from lethal injection. Four months after Smith's execution, Alan Eugene Miller, another death row inmate who was found guilty of fatally shooting three people in 1999, was also scheduled to be executed by nitrogen gas in Alabama. On September 26, 2024, Miller was executed by nitrogen gas, becoming the second person to be executed using this method. Carey Dale Grayson, who was 19 when he murdered a hitchhiker in 1994, was also executed by nitrogen gas, on November 21, 2024, becoming the third such person. Convicted serial rapist and killer Demetrius Terrence Frazier was the fourth condemned inmate to be executed by nitrogen hypoxia, on February 6, 2025. Convicted rapist-killer Jessie Hoffman Jr. was executed by nitrogen gas in the state of Louisiana on March 18, 2025, making him the fifth person to be executed in this manner, as well as the first in a state other than Alabama.

As of October 2026, eight individuals have been executed via nitrogen hypoxia.

== See also ==
- Capital punishment in Alabama
- Gee Jon
- List of botched executions
- List of people executed in Alabama
- List of people executed in the United States in 2010
- List of people executed in the United States in 2024

Executions carried out in Alabama
Preceded by Thomas Warren Whisenhant May 27, 2010	John Forrest Parker; June 10, 2010	Succeeded by Michael Jeffrey Land August 12, 2010
Executions carried out in the United States
Preceded by Melbert Ray Ford Jr. – Georgia June 9, 2010	John Forrest Parker – Alabama; June 10, 2010	Succeeded by David Lee Powell – Texas June 15, 2010
Executions by gas asphyxiation in the United States
Preceded by Walter LaGrand – Arizona March 3, 1999	Kenneth Eugene Smith– Alabama; January 25, 2024	Succeeded by Alan Eugene Miller – Alabama September 26, 2024
Executions carried out in Alabama
Preceded by Casey Allen McWhorter; November 16, 2023	Kenneth Eugene Smith; January 25, 2024	Succeeded by Jamie Ray Mills; May 30, 2024
Executions carried out in the United States
Preceded by Phillip Dean Hancock – Oklahoma; November 30, 2023	Kenneth Eugene Smith – Alabama; January 25, 2024	Succeeded by Ivan Cantu – Texas; February 28, 2024
