= Alger Correctional Facility =

Prison in Michigan, United States

Alger Correctional Facility (LMF)
- Interactive map of Alger Correctional Facility (LMF)
- Location: Munising, Alger County, Michigan; 46.37896°N 86.63614°W
- Status: Open
- Security class: Levels II & IV
- Opened: 1990
- Managed by: Michigan Department of Corrections
- Director: Warden Catherine S. Bauman
- Website: Official website

Alger Correctional Facility (LMF) is a Michigan prison for adult men, operated by the Michigan Department of Corrections. It is located in the central Upper Peninsula of Michigan in Alger County, on the south side of Munising.

== Facility ==
The prison was opened in 1990 and has six housing units currently used for Michigan Department of Corrections male prisoners 18 years of age and older. Four of the housing units are used by the general prison population, and two are used for segregating inmates from the general prison population. Onsite facilities provide for foodservice, health care, facility maintenance, storage, and prison administration.

In August 2018, in conjunction with prison strikes elsewhere in the country, prisoners within the correctional facility began a boycott against the company Globaltel. The prisoners cited abuse of private funds and exploitation as their reasons for boycotting the prison's largest communications partner.

=== Security ===
The facility is surrounded by double fences with razor-ribbon wire and gun towers. Electronic detection systems and patrol vehicles are also utilized to maintain perimeter security.

Until June 2009, the facility housed maximum security prisoners, but was refitted to house lower security Level IV prisoners following the closing of Standish Maximum Correctional Facility.

== Services ==
The facility offers libraries, barbering, education programs, substance-abuse treatment, psychotherapy, and religious services. Onsite medical and dental care is supplemented by local community providers, the Brooks Medical Center at Marquette Branch Prison and the Duane L. Waters Hospital in Jackson, Michigan.

== See also ==
- List of Michigan state prisons
