= Inert gas asphyxiation =

Insufficient oxygen in breathed air

Inert gas asphyxiation is a form of asphyxiation that results from breathing a physiologically inert gas in the absence of oxygen, or a low amount of oxygen (hypoxia), rather than atmospheric air (which is composed largely of nitrogen and oxygen). Examples of physiologically inert gases, which have caused accidental or deliberate death by this mechanism, are argon, xenon, helium and nitrogen. The term "physiologically inert" is used to indicate a gas that has no toxic or anesthetic properties and does not act upon the heart or hemoglobin. Instead, the gas acts as a simple diluent to reduce the oxygen concentration in inspired gas and blood to dangerously low levels, thereby eventually depriving cells in the body of oxygen.

According to the U.S. Chemical Safety and Hazard Investigation Board, in humans, "breathing an oxygen deficient atmosphere can have serious and immediate effects, including unconsciousness after only one or two breaths. The exposed person has no warning and cannot sense that the oxygen level is too low." In the US, at least 80 people died from accidental nitrogen asphyxiation between 1992 and 2002. Hazards with inert gases and the risks of asphyxiation are well-established.

An occasional cause of accidental death in humans, inert gas asphyxia has been used as a suicide method. Inert gas asphyxia has been advocated by proponents of euthanasia, using a gas-retaining plastic hood device colloquially referred to as a suicide bag. Nitrogen asphyxiation has been approved in some places as a method of capital punishment. In the world's first instance of its use, on January 25, 2024, Alabama executed convicted murderer Kenneth Eugene Smith via this method. It has since been used seven more times, six times in Alabama and once in Louisiana, which first used it on March 18, 2025. Alternatively, the term hypoxia has been used but this usage is flawed given that hypoxia does not necessarily imply death. On the other hand, asphyxiation is technically incorrect given respiration continues and the carbon dioxide metabolically produced from the oxygen inhaled prior to inert gas asphyxiation can be exhaled without restriction, which can prevent acidosis and the strong urge to breathe caused by hypercapnia.

== Process ==
When humans breathe in an asphyxiant gas or any other physiologically inert gas, they exhale carbon dioxide without re-supplying oxygen. Physiologically inert gases (those that have no toxic effect, but merely dilute or displace oxygen) are generally free of odor and taste. Accordingly, the human subject detects little abnormal sensation as the oxygen level falls. This leads to asphyxiation (death from lack of oxygen) without the painful and traumatic feeling of suffocation (the hypercapnic alarm response, which in humans arises mostly from carbon dioxide levels rising), or the side effects of poisoning. In scuba diving rebreather accidents, a slow decrease in oxygen breathing gas content can produce variable or no sensation. By contrast, suddenly breathing pure inert gas causes oxygen levels in the blood to fall precipitously, and may lead to unconsciousness in only a few breaths, with no symptoms at all. Some animals are better equipped than humans to detect hypoxia, and these species are less comfortable in low-oxygen environments that result from inert gas exposure, though still more averse to CO_{2} exposure.

== Physiology ==
A typical human breathes between 12 and 20 times per minute at a rate influenced primarily by carbon dioxide concentration, and thus pH, in the blood. With each breath, a volume of about 0.6 litres is exchanged from an active lung volume of about three litres. The normal composition of the Earth's atmosphere is about 78% nitrogen, 21% oxygen, and 1% argon, carbon dioxide, and other gases. After just two or three breaths of nitrogen, the oxygen concentration in the lungs would be low enough for some oxygen already in the bloodstream to exchange back to the lungs and be eliminated by exhalation. Unconsciousness in cases of accidental asphyxia can occur within one minute. Loss of consciousness results from critical hypoxia, when arterial oxygen saturation is less than 60%.

At oxygen concentrations in air of 4 to 6%, there is "loss of consciousness in 40 seconds and death within a few minutes". At an altitude over 43,000 ft (13,000 m), where the ambient oxygen concentration is equivalent to a concentration of 3.6% at sea level, an average individual can perform flying duties efficiently for only 9 to 12 seconds without oxygen supplementation. The US Air Force trains air crews to recognize their subjective signs of approaching hypoxia. Some individuals experience headache, dizziness, fatigue, nausea and euphoria, and some become unconscious without warning. Loss of consciousness may be accompanied by convulsions, and is followed by cyanosis and cardiac arrest. In a 1963 study by the RAF Institute of Aviation Medicine, subjects were asked to hyperventilate in a nitrogen atmosphere. Among the results:

When the duration of over-ventilation with nitrogen was greater than 8–10 sec the subject reported a transient dimming of vision. In the experiments in which nitrogen breathing was carried out for 15–16 sec the subject experienced some general clouding of consciousness and impairment of vision. Vision was frequently lost in these experiments for a short period. In the few experiments in which nitrogen was breathed for 17–20 sec unconsciousness supervened and was accompanied on most occasions by a generalized convulsion. The duration of the interval between the start of over-ventilation with nitrogen and the onset of symptoms was 12–14 sec.

The study did not report how much discomfort the subjects felt.

== Animals ==
=== Slaughter ===
Controlled atmosphere killing (CAK) or controlled atmosphere stunning (CAS) is a method for slaughtering or stunning animals such as swine, poultry, or cane toads by placing the animals in a container in which the atmosphere lacks oxygen and consists of an asphyxiant gas (one or more of argon, nitrogen or carbon dioxide), causing the animals to lose consciousness. Argon and nitrogen are important components of a gassing process which seem to cause no pain in some species, and for this reason many consider some types of controlled atmosphere killing more humane than other methods of killing. Other species, such as pigs, show aversion to highly concentrated nitrogen and argon. Most animals are stunned by carbon dioxide.

If carbon dioxide is used, controlled atmosphere killing is not the same as inert gas asphyxia, because carbon dioxide at high concentrations (above 5%) is not biologically inert, but rather is toxic and also produces initial distress in some animal species. The addition of toxic carbon dioxide to hypoxic atmospheres used in slaughter without animal distress is a complex and highly species-specific matter, which also depends on the concentration of carbon dioxide.

=== Euthanasia ===
Diving animals such as rats and minks and burrowing animals are sensitive to low-oxygen atmospheres and will avoid them. For this reason, the use of inert gas (hypoxic) atmospheres (without CO_{2}) for euthanasia is also species-specific.

== Accidental deaths and injury ==
Accidental nitrogen asphyxiation is a possible hazard where large quantities of nitrogen are used. It causes several deaths per year in the United States, which is asserted to be more than from any other industrial gas. In one accident in 1981, shortly before the launch of the first Space Shuttle mission, five technicians lost consciousness and two of them died after they entered the aft compartment of the orbiter. Nitrogen had been used to flush oxygen from the compartment as a precaution against fire. They were not wearing air packs because of a last-minute change in safety procedures.

During a pool party in Mexico in 2013, eight party-goers were rendered unconscious and one 21-year-old male went into a coma after liquid nitrogen was poured into the pool. Occasional deaths are reported from recreational inhalation of helium, but these are very rarely from direct inhalation from small balloons. The inhalation from larger helium balloons has been reportedly fatal. A fatal fall from a tree occurred after the inhalation of helium from a toy balloon, which caused the person to become either unconscious or lightheaded. In 2015, a technician at a health spa was asphyxiated while conducting unsupervised cryotherapy using nitrogen. In 2021, six people died of asphyxiation and 11 more were hospitalized following a liquid nitrogen leak at a poultry plant in Gainesville, Georgia.

== Suicide ==
Use of inert gas for suicide was first proposed by a Canadian, Bruce Dunn. Dunn commented that "...the acquisition of a compressed gas cylinder, an appropriate pressure reducing regulator, and suitable administration equipment... [was] not inaccessible to a determined individual, but relatively difficult for a member of the public to acquire casually or quickly". Dunn collaborated with other researchers, notably the Canadian campaigner John Hofsess, who in 1997 formed the group "NuTech" with Derek Humphry and Philip Nitschke. Two years later, NuTech had streamlined Dunn's work by using readily-available party balloon cylinders of helium.

The method of suicide based on self-administration of helium in a bag, a colloquial name being the "exit bag" or suicide bag, has been referenced by some medical euthanasia advocacy groups. Originally, such bags were used with helium, and 30 deaths were reported with use of them from 2001 to 2005, and another 79 from 2005 to 2009. This suggested to one set of reviewers that the popularity of the technique was increasing, as also did the increase in helium suicides in Sweden during the latter half of the same decade.

After attempts were made by authorities to control helium sales in Australia, a new method was introduced that instead uses nitrogen. Nitrogen became the main gas promoted by euthanasia advocates, such as Philip Nitschke, who founded a company called Max Dog Brewing in order to import canisters of nitrogen into Australia. Nitschke stated that the gas cylinders can be used for both brewing and, if required, to end life at a later stage in a "peaceful, reliable [and] totally legal" manner. Nitschke said that nitrogen is "undetectable even by autopsy, which was important to some people". Nitschke used 3D printing to build a "Sarco pod" device that fills with nitrogen at the push of a button, claiming to cause its user to become unconscious within a minute and then die of oxygen deprivation.

== Capital punishment ==
Execution by nitrogen asphyxiation was discussed briefly in print as a theoretical method of capital punishment in a 1995 National Review article. The idea was then proposed by Lawrence J. Gist II, an attorney at law, under the title, International Humanitarian Hypoxia Project. In a televised documentary in 2007, the British political commentator and former MP Michael Portillo examined execution techniques in use around the world and found them unsatisfactory; his conclusion was that nitrogen asphyxiation would be the best method.

In April 2015, Governor Mary Fallin of Oklahoma signed a bill allowing nitrogen asphyxiation as an alternative execution method. Three years later, in March 2018, Oklahoma announced that, due to the difficulty in procuring lethal injection drugs, nitrogen gas would be used to carry out executions. After making "good progress" in designing a nitrogen execution protocol, but not actually carrying out any executions, Oklahoma announced in February 2020 it had found a new reliable source of lethal injection drugs, but would continue working on nitrogen execution as a contingency method.

In March 2018, Alabama became the third state (after Oklahoma and Mississippi) to authorize the use of nitrogen asphyxiation as a method of execution. In August 2023, the Alabama Department of Corrections released its protocol for nitrogen hypoxia executions, designating Kenneth Eugene Smith, convicted of murder for hire in 1996, as the first death row inmate to undergo this method. On November 1, the Supreme Court of Alabama authorized the execution to go ahead using the nitrogen hypoxia protocol. On 25 January 2024, he became the first person to be executed by nitrogen hypoxia in the world. Though the State Attorney General said afterward that Smith's execution showed that nitrogen hypoxia was an "effective and humane method of execution", several people watching the execution reported that Smith "thrashed violently on the gurney" for several minutes, with his death reportedly occurring 10 minutes after the nitrogen was administered to the chamber. The United Nations High Commissioner for Human Rights condemned the use.

On September 26, 2024, Alan Eugene Miller became the second convicted man put to death by way of nitrogen gas, in Alabama, followed by both Carey Dale Grayson and Demetrius Terrence Frazier on November 21, 2024, and February 6, 2025, respectively. Earlier on March 5, 2024, Louisiana Governor Jeff Landry signed a law allowing executions to be carried out via nitrogen gas. A year after Louisiana approved the method, convicted rapist-killer Jessie Hoffman Jr. became the first inmate executed by nitrogen hypoxia in Louisiana on March 18, 2025, making Louisiana the second state to carry out nitrogen gas executions, while at the same time putting an end to the state of Louisiana's 15-year pause on executions.

After Smith's execution, several other states became open to the possibility of legally carrying out nitrogen gas executions. Lawmakers from Ohio, where a moratorium is in effect since the state's last execution in 2018, were considering legalizing nitrogen gas as a new method of execution aside from lethal injection. In March 2025, the Arkansas Legislature voted for a bill that authorized the use of nitrogen asphyxiation as a method of execution. Governor Sarah Huckabee Sanders signed the Bill into law on March 18, 2025.

As of 2025, Alabama, Arkansas, Oklahoma, Mississippi and Louisiana are the only states that authorize the use of nitrogen asphyxiation as a method of execution. In the case Bucklew v. Precythe in 2019, the U.S. Supreme Court ruled that a Missouri death row inmate with cavernous hemangioma, a rare disorder that causes swelling of blood-filled cavities, could not avoid death by lethal injection and choose inert gas asphyxiation using nitrogen, since it had never been used in any execution in the world.

== See also ==
- Gas chamber, a chamber for death by asphyxiation or poisoning
