= Capital punishment in Alabama =

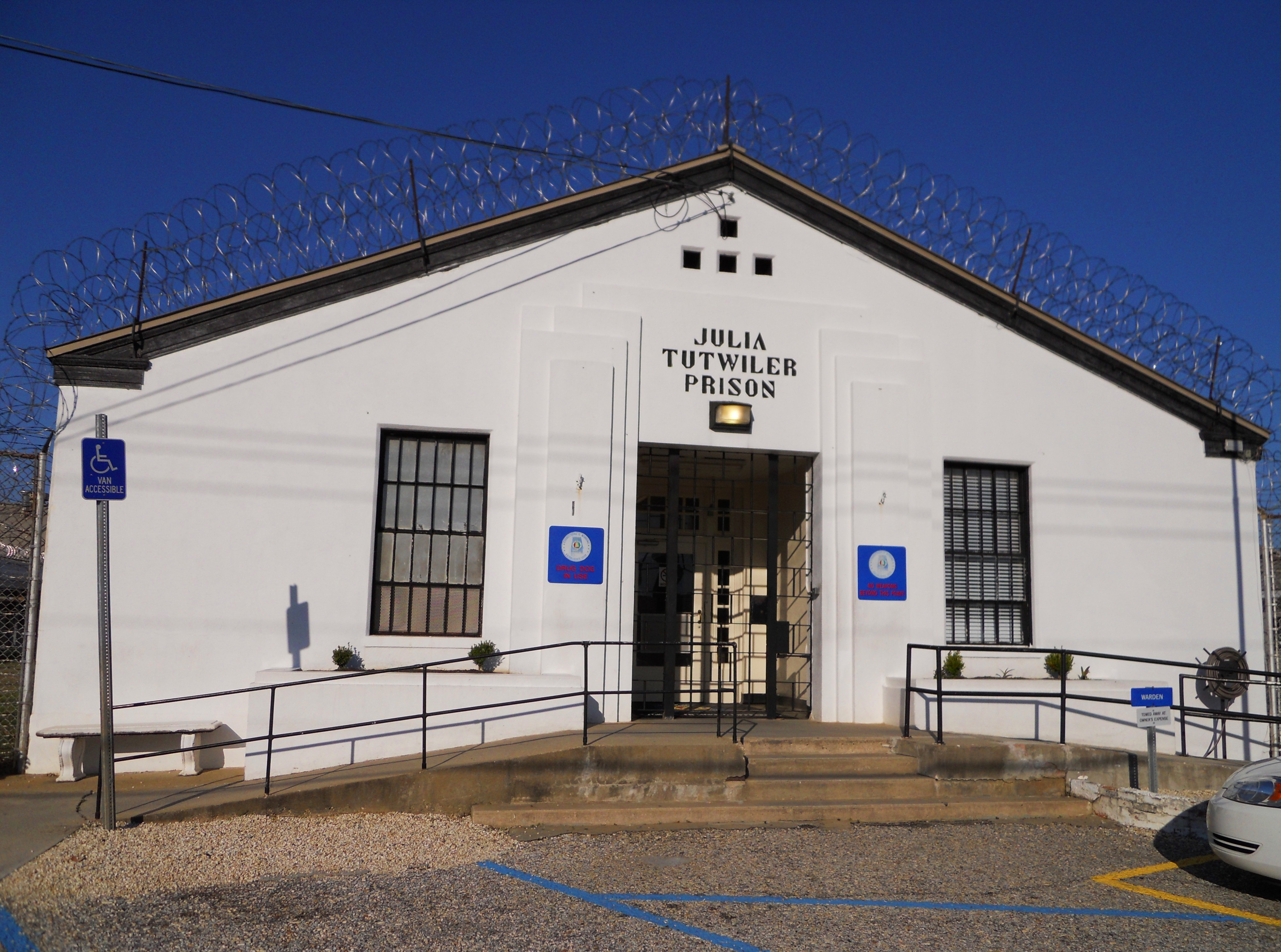
Julia Tutwiler Prison houses the state's female death row inmates.

Capital punishment in Alabama is a legal penalty. Alabama has the highest per capita capital sentencing rate in the United States. In some years, its courts have imposed more death sentences than Texas, a state that has a population five times as large. However, Texas has a higher rate of executions both in absolute terms and per capita.

== Legal process ==
When the prosecution seeks the death penalty, the sentence is decided by the jury and at least 10 jurors must concur.

In case of a hung jury during the penalty phase of the trial, a retrial happens before another jury.

In 2023, the Alabama Supreme Court ruled that, when a condemned person appeals, the appellate court does not have to actively look for errors in the original judgment and only has to consider constitutional violations if the objection was already raised at trial. Previously, through 2022, appellate courts had been required to search for errors in the original judgment and to consider any constitutional violations that may have occurred at trial, regardless of whether the trial lawyer had objected.

For cases prior to 2017, the sole determinant of the sentence was the sentencing judge who had the authority to override the jury's recommendation provided it was given appropriate weight. Prospectively, from 2017, the judge must abide by the verdict of the jury. The law is not retroactive. A report in May 2024 revealed that Alabama had 30 condemned prisoners who were still facing death sentences received due to judicial override prior to its abolition.

All executions occur at Holman Correctional Facility, and most men who have been sentenced to death are incarcerated there. In the 20th century, Holman's death row had a capacity of only 20, but in 2000, the segregation unit was expanded to add 200 single cells. Men who are required to stay in the Birmingham judicial district are housed at the William E. Donaldson Correctional Facility, which has a death row capacity of 24. Women who have been sentenced to death are housed at the Julia Tutwiler Prison for Women.

The power of clemency belongs to the Governor of Alabama.

The state's current primary method of execution is lethal injection, unless the condemned requests electrocution or nitrogen hypoxia. If the selected method (whether chosen by the offender or by default) is found unconstitutional, state statutes provide for the use of "any constitutional method of execution", which would likely include hanging, the gas chamber or firing squad.

Alabama was the next-to-last state (only aside from Nebraska) to give death row inmates the option to die by lethal injection; from 1927 to 2002, all executions were mandated to be carried out by electrocution via electric chair. In 2002, the old death chamber was renovated to accommodate a lethal injection gurney, although it was designed to accommodate executions by electrocution upon an inmate's request. The state's electric chair (nicknamed "Yellow Mama" due to sporting a coat of yellow highway paint) is currently stored in a closet above the death chamber. Alabama's final execution by electrocution was that of Lynda Lyon Block on May 10, 2002; the first lethal injection was that of Anthony Keith Johnson on December 12, 2002.

In February 2023, following a review of failed lethal injections, Governor Kay Ivey said executions would resume. The first occurred on July 21, 2023.

== Capital crimes ==
The following kinds of murder are punishable by death in Alabama:

1. Murder by the defendant during a kidnapping in the first degree or an attempt thereof committed by the defendant.
2. Murder by the defendant during a robbery in the first degree. There is no attempted robbery in Alabama because it is a crime against the person and not the property. In most cases an attempted statute is Ala. Code § 13A-4-2 and decreases the crime one degree.
3. Murder by the defendant during a rape in the first or second degree or an attempt thereof committed by the defendant; or murder by the defendant during sodomy in the first or second degree or an attempt thereof committed by the defendant.
4. Murder by the defendant during a burglary in the first or second degree or an attempt thereof committed by the defendant.
5. Murder of any police officer, sheriff, deputy, state trooper, federal law enforcement officer, or any other state or federal peace officer of any kind, or prison or jail guard, while such officer or guard is on duty, regardless of whether the defendant knew or should have known the victim was an officer or guard on duty, or because of some official or job-related act or performance of such officer or guard.
6. Murder committed while the defendant is under a sentence of life imprisonment.
7. Murder done for a pecuniary or other valuable consideration or pursuant to a contract or for hire.
8. Murder committed during sexual abuse in the first or second degree or an attempt thereof committed by the defendant.
9. Murder committed during arson in the first or second degree committed by the defendant; or murder by the defendant by means of explosives or explosion.
10. Murder wherein two or more persons are murdered by the defendant by one act or pursuant to one scheme or course of conduct.
11. Murder committed when the victim is a state or federal public official or former public official and the murder stems from or is caused by or is related to his official position, act, or capacity.
12. Murder committed during the act of unlawfully assuming control of any aircraft by use of threats or force with intent to obtain any valuable consideration for the release of said aircraft or any passenger or crewmen thereon or to direct the route or movement of said aircraft, or otherwise exert control over said aircraft.
13. Murder committed by an offender convicted of any other murder in the 20 years preceding the crime which constitutes the capital crime under Alabama law at the time.
14. Murder is related to the capacity or role of the victim as a witness.
15. Murder of a victim less than 14 years of age.
16. Murder committed by or through the use of a deadly weapon fired or otherwise used from outside a dwelling while the victim is in a dwelling.
17. Murder committed by or through the use of a deadly weapon while the victim is in a vehicle.
18. Murder committed by or through the use of a deadly weapon fired or otherwise used within or from a vehicle.
19. Murder by the defendant where a court had issued a protective order for the victim against the defendant.

== History ==
Between 1812 and 1965, 708 people were executed in Alabama. Until 1927, hanging was the primary method of execution, although one person was put to death by firing squad.

In addition to murder, capital crimes in Alabama formerly included rape, arson, and robbery. According to the Alabama Department of Corrections, 31 persons were executed by the state for crimes other than murder – including rape, robbery, and burglary – between 1927 and 1959. In Kennedy v. Louisiana, the U.S. Supreme Court has essentially eliminated the death penalty for any crime at the state level except murder.

The 1972 U.S. Supreme Court case Furman v. Georgia, requiring a degree of consistency in the application of the death penalty, established a de facto moratorium on capital punishment across the United States. That moratorium remained until July 2, 1976, when Gregg v. Georgia decided how states could impose death sentences without violating the Eighth Amendment's ban against cruel and unusual punishment. Alabama passed legislation reinstating the use of the death penalty on March 25, 1976, when Alabama's legislature passed, and Governor George Wallace signed, a new death penalty statute. No execution under this law was carried out until 1983.

From 1983 to 2026, Alabama has executed 86 people. As of November 2026, Alabama had 148 inmates on death row, the 4th highest number in the US.

=== Clemency ===
Since 1976, only four death row inmates have been granted clemency and had their death sentences commuted to life: first, outgoing Governor Fob James commuted Judith Ann Neelley's death sentence to life in prison in January 1999.

The second was in February 2025, when Robin Dion Myers, who was convicted of the 1991 murder of Ludie Mae Tucker, had his death sentence commuted to life without parole by Governor Kay Ivey after the Alabama Supreme Court authorized the setting of an execution date by nitrogen asphyxiation. Ivey expressed that she made her decision to commute the sentence based on her own doubts regarding Myers' guilt, as well as the fact that Myers' jury had unanimously recommended life imprisonment, while his trial judge overrode the recommendation and instituted a death sentence anyway.

The third was Charles Lee Burton in 2026, who was convicted of the 1991 murder of Doug Battle. Governor Kay Ivey commuted his death sentence to life without parole on March 10, 2026, two days before his scheduled execution, due to Ivey's concerns regarding Burton's role in the crime for which he was condemned to die; Burton was the ringleader of the robbery that resulted in victim Doug Battle's murder, but he was not in the store at the time Battle was shot to death. The triggerman, Derrick DeBruce, had his own death sentence commuted to life without parole. Additionally, Battle's daughter wrote to Governor Ivey requesting mercy for Burton, and Burton expressed remorse for his role in the robbery and Battle's murder.

On October 20, 2026, Ivey commuted the death sentence of Toforest Johnson to life without parole, citing there was insufficient direct evidence to carry out the highest penalty of death in the case of Johnson, who was controversially convicted of the 1995 murder of a Jefferson County deputy sheriff solely based on the testimony of a single witness, whose credibility was later disputed.

=== 21st-century developments ===
In 2016, Jefferson County Circuit Judge Tracie Todd ruled that the Alabama capital murder provision allowing judges to issue the death penalty by overriding jury recommendations for life without parole to be unconstitutional. In 2020, the Alabama Court of the Judiciary charged Todd with an ethics complaint lodged by the Judicial Inquiry Commission, which accused the Birmingham judge of using her position to oppose and override the state death penalty. Todd was suspended without pay for 90 days and then permitted to return to her duties as a judge.

In February 2018, Alabama carried out the botched attempted execution of Doyle Hamm. During the execution attempt, executioners attempted for nearly three hours to insert an IV that could be used to administer the lethal injection drugs. In the process, the execution team punctured Hamm's bladder and femoral artery, causing significant bleeding.

On September 22, 2022, Alabama planned to execute Alan Eugene Miller but canceled the execution after failing to find a suitable vein. On November 17, 2022, Alabama similarly was unable to execute Kenneth Eugene Smith because the state corrections staff were unable to find a suitable vein. Following several botched executions, Governor Kay Ivey paused all executions until July 2023. Smith's execution was rescheduled and carried out on January 25, 2024; it was the nation's first use of nitrogen gas as an execution method. Smith had requested this method.

In late 2024, Matt Simpson, an Alabama politician, proposed a death penalty bill for child rapists that could ultimately challenge the precedent set in Kennedy v. Louisiana. The bill is similar to laws passed in Florida and Tennessee. The Alabama House committee approved the bill in February 2025, and it passed by an 86–5 vote (in addition to nine abstentions). The bill would fail in the senate in 2025. Simpson reintroduced the bill again in 2026. The 2016 bill passed the house on January 27, 2026, on a vote of 73–6 with 17 abstentions. It passed in the senate in February 2026 on a 33–1 vote. On February 12, 2026, Governor Kay Ivey signed the bill into law.

In late May 2026, U.S. District Judge Emily Marks ruled that Alabama's nitrogen asphyxiation method of execution was constitutional and not in violation of the Eighth Amendment's cruel and unusual punishment ban. The decision would directly affect Alabama death row inmate Jeffery Lee, who was scheduled to die by nitrogen asphyxiation on June 11, 2026, and had challenged his mandated method of execution in a lawsuit he and his legal team filed in 2025. However, in early June 2026 and before Lee's execution date, a panel of three judges from the United States Court of Appeals for the Eleventh Circuit overturned Marks' ruling based on evidence that inmates could take up to three minutes to lose consciousness, which the panel determined was "intolerable ... given the suffering that would likely take place under Alabama's nitrogen hypoxia protocol." After reevaluating her previous ruling, Judge Marks concurred with the Eleventh Circuit panel, stating that Lee had adequately proven not only that Alabama's protocol violated the Eighth Amendment's ban on cruel and unusual punishment, but that Alabama could utilize other methods of execution to kill Lee, including the firing squad, which Marks found would be easy for Alabama to quickly assemble and accommodate in Holman Correctional Institution to subject Lee to a "quick and painless death", as well as methods that were already legal and practiced in the state like lethal injection and electrocution. Judge Marks issued a permanent injunction prohibiting the state from using nitrogen asphyxiation to execute Lee. The Alabama Attorney General's Office under Steve Marshall contested Marks' new ruling, appealing her decision to the U.S. Supreme Court. On June 11, 2026, the same day as Lee's scheduled execution, the U.S. Supreme Court ruled 6–3 in Lee's favor, prohibiting Alabama from using their nitrogen asphyxiation protocol to execute Lee. The next day, June 12, Alabama's Attorney General's Office requested that the Alabama Supreme Court authorize a new death warrant for Lee, this time requiring execution by lethal injection, since the injunction from Judge Marks only prohibited the use of nitrogen asphyxiation. For the time being, Lee's execution was called off. On July 30, 2026, Lee was re-scheduled to be put to death by lethal injection on September 17, 2026.

The decision in Jeffrey Lee's case raised doubts about the ability for Alabama to use nitrogen asphyxiation to carry out any executions in the future. At the time of the June 2026 injunction, there had been seven executions by that method in Alabama and one in Louisiana; shortly before the injunction, Alabama's Supreme Court had also authorized the execution of Michael Taylor, another death row inmate whose attorneys referenced the injunction in Lee's case to request that the court rescind Taylor's warrant.

== Specific cases and controversy (executed and non-executed inmates) ==
=== Ineffective Assistance of Counsel and Key Overturned Cases ===
Alabama's capital punishment legal process has faced scrutiny regarding state-funded defense representation and procedural defaults. Unlike most states, Alabama does not fully guarantee state-funded legal counsel for post-conviction appeals, often relying on volunteer attorneys.

=== Hinton v. Alabama (2014) ===
In 1985, Anthony Ray Hinton was convicted of two capital murders during restaurant robberies in Birmingham, Alabama, and sentenced to death based on forensic firearm analysis matching a revolver found in his mother's home to bullets from the crime scenes. Hinton's court-appointed attorney mistakenly believed state law capped defense funding for expert witnesses at $1,000, leading him to hire an unqualified ballistics expert who was easily discredited on cross-examination.

In 2014, the Supreme Court of the United States issues a per curiam decision in Hinton v. Alabama (571, U.S. 263), holding that the attorney's failure to request additional funding for a competent expert constituted ineffective assistance of counsel under Strickland v. Washington. State ballistics experts subsequently re-examined the evidence and concluded the crime bullets could not be matched to Hinton's gun. All charges were dismissed, and Hinton was exonerated in April 2015 after serving 28 years on death row.

=== Pre-Furman era (before 1976) ===
==== Scottsboro Boys ====
In March 1931, two white women accused nine black boys and young men of rape. The boys and men – Eugene Williams and Roy Wright, 13; Ozie Powell and Willie Roberson, 15; Olen Montgomery, 17; Haywood Patterson, 18; and Clarence Norris, Charlie Weems, and Andy Wright, 19 – were subjected to threats of lynch mob violence before indictment and faced several trials adjudged by all-white juries, while represented by inexperienced attorneys. All but Wright, whose case ended in a mistrial after his court determined he was too young to execute despite multiple jurors voting for him to be sentenced to death, were convicted of rape and sentenced to death by electrocution. This was despite there being little to no evidence suggesting any sexual attack had taken place, and modern analysts suggest the two women may have made the false accusations to protect themselves from consequences for violating the Mann Act by allegedly crossing state lines to engage in prostitution. The eight death-sentenced defendants had a scheduled mass execution date of July 10, 1931, but their executions were postponed due to legal intervention first from the Communist Party USA and their legal arm, the International Labor Defense (ILD), and later from civil rights activists working with the NAACP. The intervention ultimately led to the death sentences being overturned.

Over the next decade, while the defendants received vigorous representation from the ILD and NAACP, courts overturned the defendants' death sentences and granted requests for new trials. This was despite the fact that by 1933, one of the women who had accused the Scottsboro Boys of rape, Ruby Bates, had recanted her accusations, apologized to the defendants, and insisted no rape ever took place, while Victoria Price, the other accuser, still insisted a rape had taken place. The defendants underwent multiple trials; Haywood Patterson was subjected to a total of four trials, the first three of which ended with him being sentenced to death, while his fourth and final trial in January 1936 resulted in a 75-year prison sentence. At his third and final trial in July 15, 1937, Clarence Norris was again sentenced to death; at his second and final trial on July 22, Andy Wright was sentenced to 99 years in prison; and at his second and final trial on July 24, 1937, Charlie Weems was sentenced to 75 years in prison. On the same day, the rest of the defendants received their final dispositions: a new prosecutor dropped rape charges against Ozie Powell and accepted a guilty plea for assault of a deputy, resulting in a 20-year sentence, and meanwhile, the rest of the defendants - Willie Roberson, Olen Montgomery, Eugene Williams, and Roy Wright – had all charges dropped due to prosecutors believing they were all innocent. In 1938, Alabama governor Graves commuted the final death sentence, that of Norris, to life imprisonment, but refused to pardon any of the Scottsboro Boys.

The last "Scottsboro Boy" to die was Clarence Norris, who died of Alzheimer's disease in January 1989 while a free man; he had been pardoned and officially declared innocent of all charges in October 1976. By 2013, all but three defendants had either seen their convictions overturned or had been posthumously pardoned. On November 21, 2013, the Alabama legislature approved posthumous pardons for those who had not already been pardoned: Charlie Weems, Andy Wright, and Haywood Patterson. Historians largely consider the Scottsboro Boys' case to have been a miscarriage of justice and a case exemplifying the legal maxim of "An unjust law is no law at all".

=== Post-Gregg era (1976–present) ===
Corey Maples was convicted for the murder of two people in 1995. To try to assist with lowering his sentence, a New York-based law firm by the name of Sullivan & Cromwell volunteered to help with the case. Alabama is the only US state to not fully guarantee state-funded legal representation for death row inmates. Volunteer lawyers and attorneys are a common occurrence in Alabama. After Sullivan & Cromwell agreed to represent Maples, a judge mailed out a letter that discussed Maples' ruling to the law firm. A common step in the legal process. However, the letter was never opened by the company that was supposed to receive the letter. This ultimately caused Maples to miss his originally scheduled appeal date. Maples' case highlights the unique flaws in the system relative to the state of Alabama. His volunteer attorneys and law firm "Sullivan & Cromwell" essentially abandoned him. Because of the overwhelming evidence in favor of Maples, his life was eventually saved in 2024 by a separate law firm, Latham & Watkins.

Joseph Smith was convicted and sentenced to death for the murder in 1997. However, there is controversy surrounding Smith's mental disability. Smith and his legal team claim he suffered physical and verbal abuse in his childhood upbringing. He was also in special education classes during his schooling days. He eventually dropped out of school for good in the seventh grade. A major portion of Alabama's system of determining if someone is intellectually disabled is in the form of IQ test scores. In order for an Alabama death row inmate to be categorized as intellectually disabled, they must score below 70 on an IQ test. Smith's scores ranged from as low as 72, to as high as 78. There has been an outpouring of support from the public for Smith, stating that the criteria is unfair. As of today, Smith is still on death row. The Supreme Court is currently hearing Alabama's appeal for Smith.

William Kuenzel was convicted of murder and sentenced to death for the murder of a convenience store clerk in 1987. However, Kuenzel argued there was evidence he did not commit or participate in the murder. The accomplice to the murder, Harvey Venn, told police he went with a school friend to the convenience store, where the murder took place. Also, the appeals team argued there was no physical evidence tying Kuenzel to the crime. However, Kuenzel missed a deadline earlier in the case and the process to appeal. His appeals were denied because of that missed deadline. In December 2022, William Kuenzel died while residing on death row.

== See also ==
- List of people executed in Alabama
- List of people executed in Alabama (pre-1972)
- List of death row inmates in the United States § Alabama
- Crime in Alabama
- Law of Alabama
