= List of people executed in the United States in 2023 =

Twenty-four people, twenty-three male and one female, were executed in the United States in 2023, all by lethal injection.

== List of people executed in the United States in 2023 ==
No.	Date of execution	Name	Age of person			Gender	Ethnicity	State	Method	Ref.
No.	Date of execution	Name	At execution	At offense	Age difference	Gender	Ethnicity	State	Method	Ref.
1	January 3, 2023	Amber McLaughlin (Note: Amber McLaughlin has also been identified as Scott A. McLaughlin in the death warrant and prison records. McLaughlin transitioned from male to female while incarcerated. She thus became the first transgender woman executed in the United States.)	49	30	19	Female	White	Missouri	Lethal injection	
2	January 10, 2023	Robert Alan Fratta	65	37	28	Male	White	Texas	Lethal injection	
3	January 12, 2023	Scott James Eizember	62	42	20	Male	White	Oklahoma	Lethal injection	
4	February 1, 2023	Wesley Lynn Ruiz	43	27	16	Male	Hispanic	Texas	Lethal injection	
5	February 7, 2023	Leonard Sheldon Taylor	58	40	18	Male	Black	Missouri	Lethal injection	
6	February 8, 2023	John Lezell Balentine	54	28	26	Male	Black	Texas	Lethal injection	
7	February 23, 2023	Donald David Dillbeck	59	27	32	Male	White	Florida	Lethal injection	
8	March 7, 2023	Gary Green	51	38	13	Male	Black	Texas	Lethal injection	
9	March 9, 2023	Arthur Brown Jr.	52	21	31	Male	Black	Texas	Lethal injection	
10	April 12, 2023	Louis Bernard Gaskin	56	22	34	Male	Black	Florida	Lethal injection	
11	May 3, 2023	Darryl Brian Barwick	56	19	37	Male	White	Florida	Lethal injection	
12	June 6, 2023	Michael Andrew Tisius	42	19	23	Male	White	Missouri	Lethal injection	
13	June 15, 2023	Duane Eugene Owen	62	23	39	Male	White	Florida	Lethal injection	
14	July 20, 2023	Jemaine Monteil Cannon	51	23	28	Male	Black	Oklahoma	Lethal injection	
15	July 21, 2023	James Edward Barber	64	42	22	Male	White	Alabama	Lethal injection	
16	August 1, 2023	Johnny Allen Johnson	45	24	21	Male	White	Missouri	Lethal injection	
17	August 3, 2023	James Phillip Barnes	61	26	35	Male	White	Florida	Lethal injection	
18	September 21, 2023	Anthony Castillo Sanchez	44	18	26	Male	Hispanic	Oklahoma	Lethal injection	
19	October 3, 2023	Michael Duane Zack III	54	27	27	Male	White	Florida	Lethal injection	
20	October 10, 2023	Jedidiah Isaac Murphy	48	25	23	Male	White	Texas	Lethal injection	
21	November 9, 2023	Brent Ray Brewer	53	19	34	Male	White	Texas	Lethal injection	
22	November 16, 2023	Casey Allen McWhorter	49	18	31	Male	White	Alabama	Lethal injection	
23	November 16, 2023	David Santiago Renteria	53	31	22	Male	Native American	Texas	Lethal injection	
24	November 30, 2023	Phillip Dean Hancock	59	37	22	Male	White	Oklahoma	Lethal injection	
		Average:	54 years	28 years	26 years					

== Demographics ==
Gender
Male	23	96%
Female	1	4%
Ethnicity
White	15	63%
Black	6	25%
Hispanic	2	8%
Native American	1	4%
State
Texas	8	33%
Florida	6	25%
Missouri	4	17%
Oklahoma	4	17%
Alabama	2	8%
Method
Lethal injection	24	100%
Month
January	3	13%
February	4	17%
March	2	8%
April	1	4%
May	1	4%
June	2	8%
July	2	8%
August	2	8%
September	1	4%
October	2	8%
November	4	17%
December	0	0%
Age
40–49	7	29%
50–59	12	50%
60–69	5	21%
Total	24	100%

== Executions in recent years ==
Number of executions
2024	25
2023	24
2022	18
Total	67

== See also ==
- List of death row inmates in the United States
- List of juveniles executed in the United States since 1976
- List of most recent executions by jurisdiction
- List of people executed in Texas, 2020–present
- List of women executed in the United States since 1976

== Notes ==
Preceded by 2022	List of people executed in the United States in 2023	Succeeded by 2024
