= List of people executed in the United States in 2024 =

Twenty-five people, all male, were executed in the United States in 2024, three by nitrogen hypoxia and twenty-two by lethal injection. The first person executed in 2024, Kenneth Eugene Smith, became the first person in the United States and in the world to be executed by nitrogen hypoxia. Three states saw their first executions in over a decade. Utah saw its first execution since 2010 in August. South Carolina carried out its first execution since 2011 in September. Indiana conducted its first execution since 2009 in December. September 2024 also saw the greatest number of inmates executed within a one-week span since July 2003.

== List of people executed in the United States in 2024 ==
No.	Date of execution	Name	Age of person			Gender	Ethnicity	State	Method	Ref.
No.	Date of execution	Name	At execution	At offense	Age difference	Gender	Ethnicity	State	Method	Ref.
1	January 25, 2024	Kenneth Eugene Smith	58	22	36	Male	White	Alabama	Nitrogen hypoxia	
2	February 28, 2024	Ivan Abner Cantu	50	27	23	Male	Hispanic	Texas	Lethal injection	
3	March 20, 2024	Willie James Pye	59	28	31	Male	Black	Georgia	Lethal injection	
4	April 4, 2024	Michael Dewayne Smith	41	19	22	Male	Black	Oklahoma	Lethal injection	
5	April 9, 2024	Brian Joseph Dorsey	52	34	18	Male	White	Missouri	Lethal injection	
6	May 30, 2024	Jamie Ray Mills	50	30	20	Male	White	Alabama	Lethal injection	
7	June 11, 2024	David Russell Hosier	69	54	15	Male	White	Missouri	Lethal injection	
8	June 26, 2024	Ramiro Felix Gonzales	41	18	23	Male	Hispanic	Texas	Lethal injection	
9	June 27, 2024	Richard Norman Rojem Jr.	66	26	40	Male	White	Oklahoma	Lethal injection	
10	July 18, 2024	Keith Edmund Gavin	64	37	27	Male	Black	Alabama	Lethal injection	
11	August 7, 2024	Arthur Lee Burton	54	27	27	Male	Black	Texas	Lethal injection	
12	August 8, 2024	Taberon Dave Honie	48	22	26	Male	Native American	Utah	Lethal injection	
13	August 29, 2024	Loran Kenstley Cole	57	27	30	Male	White	Florida	Lethal injection	
14	September 20, 2024	Freddie Eugene Owens	46	19	27	Male	Black	South Carolina	Lethal injection	
15	September 24, 2024	Marcellus Scott Williams	55	29	26	Male	Black	Missouri	Lethal injection	
16	September 24, 2024	Travis James Mullis	38	21	17	Male	White	Texas	Lethal injection	
17	September 26, 2024	Emmanuel Antonia Littlejohn	52	20	32	Male	Black	Oklahoma	Lethal injection	
18	September 26, 2024	Alan Eugene Miller	59	34	25	Male	White	Alabama	Nitrogen hypoxia	
19	October 1, 2024	Garcia Glen White	61	26	35	Male	Black	Texas	Lethal injection	
20	October 17, 2024	Derrick Ryan Dearman	36	27	9	Male	White	Alabama	Lethal injection	
21	November 1, 2024	Richard Bernard Moore	59	34	25	Male	Black	South Carolina	Lethal injection	
22	November 21, 2024	Carey Dale Grayson	50	19	31	Male	White	Alabama	Nitrogen hypoxia	
23	December 3, 2024	Christopher Leroy Collings	49	32	17	Male	White	Missouri	Lethal injection	
24	December 18, 2024	Joseph Edward Corcoran	49	22	27	Male	White	Indiana	Lethal injection	
25	December 19, 2024	Kevin Ray Underwood	45	26	19	Male	White	Oklahoma	Lethal injection	
		Average:	52 years	27 years	25 years					

== Demographics ==
Gender
Male	25	100%
Female	0	0%
Ethnicity
White	13	52%
Black	9	36%
Hispanic	2	8%
Native American	1	4%
State
Alabama	6	24%
Texas	5	20%
Missouri	4	16%
Oklahoma	4	16%
South Carolina	2	8%
Florida	1	4%
Georgia	1	4%
Indiana	1	4%
Utah	1	4%
Method
Lethal injection	22	88%
Nitrogen hypoxia	3	12%
Month
January	1	4%
February	1	4%
March	1	4%
April	2	8%
May	1	4%
June	3	12%
July	1	4%
August	3	12%
September	5	20%
October	2	8%
November	2	8%
December	3	12%
Age
30–39	2	8%
40–49	7	28%
50–59	12	48%
60–69	4	16%
Total	25	100%

== Executions in recent years ==
Number of executions
2025	47
2024	25
2023	24
Total	96

== See also ==
- List of death row inmates in the United States
- List of juveniles executed in the United States since 1976
- List of most recent executions by jurisdiction
- List of people executed in Texas, 2020–present
- List of women executed in the United States since 1976

Preceded by 2023	List of people executed in the United States in 2024	Succeeded by 2025
