= Quintin Jones =

Quintin Jones may refer to:

- Execution of Quintin Jones (1979–2021), American man executed in Texas
- Quintin Jones (American football) (born 1966), former American football safety player
- Quentin Jones (born 1983), English mixed-media artist
