= Murder of Farah Fratta =

1994 contract killing of a woman in Texas, U.S.

- Location: Atascocita, Texas, United States
- Date: November 9, 1994
- Attack type: Murder by firearms Contract killing
- Verdict: All three men found guilty of capital murder and sentenced to death
- Convictions: Capital murder
- Sentence: Death by lethal injection
- Convicted: Robert Alan Fratta, 37; Howard Paul Guidry, 18; Joseph Andrew Prystash, 38

On November 9, 1994, 33-year-old Farah Fratta (August 5, 1961 – November 9, 1994) was gunned down at her home in Atascocita, Texas, United States. Investigations revealed that Robert Alan Fratta (February 22, 1957 – January 10, 2023), a police officer and the estranged husband of Farah, had hired two men to kill her, for which the motive was related to the unresolved divorce between the couple and the fight for custody of their children.

Fratta's neighbor, Joseph Andrew Prystash (September 5, 1956 – June 17, 2025), acted as the middleman and was recruited by Fratta to plan the murder. The hired gunman, Howard Paul Guidry (born April 15, 1976), was recruited by Prystash to carry out the murder itself. The case remained unsolved for months before Guidry was arrested for an unrelated bank robbery case and was linked to the murder. His arrest also led to the arrests of Fratta and Prystash.

All three conspirators were found guilty of capital murder and were sentenced to death in separate trials. Fratta, who denied masterminding his wife's murder and maintained his innocence, was executed by lethal injection on January 10, 2023, after his appeals failed. Prystash died in 2025 before his execution could be carried out. Guidry remains on death row at the Allan B. Polunsky Unit.

== Background and murder ==
=== Divorce and murder plot ===
Farah Fahmida Baquer was born in Guildford, Surrey, England, on August 5, 1961. In 1983, she married Robert Alan Fratta, a public safety officer in Missouri City, Texas. Together, the couple had three children.

Nine years later, Farah filed for divorce in March 1992. She alleged that her husband made bizarre and deviant sexual demands. The lawsuit continued for two years, and the couple fought for the custody rights of their two sons and one daughter.

According to Robert Fratta's co-workers and friends, on many occasions they heard him state his intent to kill his wife due to his embitterment towards her. One of Fratta's friends from the gym said that Fratta told him about his plan to use a gun and shoot her multiple times, while another claimed that he heard Fratta talking about engineering his wife's death as a carjacking-turned-murder and brought a gun along during their time in a nightclub. At least two of Fratta's co-workers from the police force also heard Fratta saying he was unhappy about the possible child custody payments and thought about killing Farah to gain custodial rights of his children.

Others also testified that they had heard Fratta state his intention to hire people to kill his wife on many occasions. Fratta had told a female friend that he was looking for hitmen, specifically those of African-American descent, to assassinate his wife. Another friend was consulted by Fratta at a diner on whether he could find a person to murder his wife. Fratta also asked a colleague to help murder his wife.

In 1994, Fratta, then 37 years old, approached his gym friend, 38-year-old Joseph Andrew Prystash, who agreed to help him find a gunman to do the job. Prystash eventually recruited his 18-year-old neighbour Howard Paul Guidry to kill Farah.

=== Death of Farah and investigations ===
On the night of November 9, 1994, in Atascocita, Texas, after having dinner with Fratta and their children, Farah stayed home alone after Fratta took the children out, the younger two to the church nursery and the oldest to a catechism class. Farah left the house for a haircut before she returned home again. At that point, Fratta was not in the house, as he was attending church.

According to court and media sources, Farah was in her house's garage when she encountered Howard Guidry who fired two shots, which both struck Farah in the head, killing her. Farah's neighbours reportedly witnessed Farah being shot by Guidry, whom they described to be an African-American man or likely a White man dressed in black; Guidry was indeed African-American. The neighbours witnessed Guidry rushing out of the car and fleeing the scene; the car was driven by Joseph Prystash.

After the murder, the police suspected Fratta was involved, but due to insufficient evidence, he was released after questioning. Various individuals noticed that Fratta did not seem to be sad, outraged or concerned about his wife's death. The parents of Farah offered a US$5,000 reward for clues leading to the arrest of their daughter's killer(s).

The child custody rights trial proceeded with Fratta on one side and Farah's parents (Fratta's parents-in-law) Betty and Lex Baquer on the other. In December 1994, it was decided by the courts that Farah's parents should be granted the custodial rights to their grandchildren, and Fratta was granted supervised visitation rights for every Saturday and daily 15-minute phone calls with his children. The Family Court Judge Robert Hinojosa reportedly reprimanded Fratta to be unfit as a parent due to his alleged involvement in the murder. Fratta was also fired from his job due to his alleged connection to the murder.

The case remained unsolved for months until March 1, 1995, when Guidry was arrested for an unrelated bank robbery. When he was arrested, the police discovered a .38 caliber Charter Arms revolver in his backpack. A few days later, Mary Gipp, Prystash's girlfriend, informed the police that Guidry was involved in Farah's murder. A detective retrieved the revolver found with Guidry and requested a registration check. Federal firearms records revealed that Fratta had purchased the revolver in 1982. Farah's father identified the revolver as the one she had entrusted to him for safekeeping in 1993 and that he had returned to Fratta in the summer of 1994. A firearms examiner from the Houston Police Department testified that one of the bullet fragments found in Farah's garage had been fired from the revolver, and another fragment, though too damaged for a definite match, had likely come from a gun made by the same manufacturer.

After Guidry's arrest, Fratta and Prystash were arrested for plotting Farah's murder. The subsequent confessions of Prystash and Guidry, as well as the testimony given by Prystash's girlfriend, further implicated Fratta as the mastermind of the homicide.

Unrelated to the case, William Edward "Bill" Planter, a former policeman, was arrested for allegedly asking Farah's father to allow him to kill Fratta. Planter, who faced a possible life sentence for the crime of attempting to instigate murder, was found guilty and sentenced to 17 years in prison. In February 2000, after his appeal, Planter was acquitted by the Texas Court of Criminal Appeals. Later that same month, Planter was released from prison.

== Murder trials and sentencing ==
=== Criminal charges ===
After their arrests, the three perpetrators were charged with capital murder, an offense that carries either life imprisonment or the death penalty under Texas state law. Each was put on trial in separate courts.

Fratta also faced contempt charges for failing to pay child support or maintain the health insurance of his three children throughout the three months after losing custody of the children. A judge later ordered Fratta to pay US$3,000 to his children or he would be sent to prison for non-compliance with the court order. The charges of contempt were withdrawn after Fratta paid the amount to his children.

=== Trial of Robert Fratta ===
Fratta was the first to stand trial on April 9, 1996. The prosecution presented evidence that Fratta was responsible for soliciting the murder of his wife based on the ballistics tests and statements given by the witnesses and Fratta's own accomplices. It was also revealed that Fratta offered to pay Guidry US$1,000 and Prystash US$2,000 and a jeep to murder Farah. Clinical psychologist Laurence Abrams testified that Fratta harbored both lack of appreciation of other people's feelings and regarded women as "little girls" who could easily be dominated by men.

On April 18, 1996, the jury found Fratta guilty of the solicitation of Farah's murder, and the trial progressed to its sentencing phase, where the jury could decide between death by lethal injection or a life sentence with the possibility of parole after at least 40 years. During the sentencing phase, Betty Baquer, the 59-year-old mother of Farah, was allowed to make a victim impact statement, and she labelled her former son-in-law as a "monster" for having caused her daughter's death and the case's aftereffects in their lives.

On April 24, 1996, the jury unanimously agreed on the death penalty. On May 3, 1996, Fratta was sentenced to death.

=== Trial of Joseph Prystash ===
Joseph Prystash

Prystash was the second person to stand trial on July 1, 1996. The prosecution sought the death penalty. His girlfriend testified against him.

On July 8, 1996, after deliberating for 17 minutes, the jury convicted Prystash of capital murder. On July 11, 1996, the jury sentenced Prystash to death.

On August 2, 1996, Prystash was sentenced to death.

=== Trial of Howard Guidry ===
Howard Guidry

On March 20, 1997, Howard Guidry was the last person to stand trial.

The jury convicted Guidry of capital murder after a week-long trial. The prosecution argued that Guidry deserved to be subjected to capital punishment due to the heinous nature of the murder and Guidry's history of violence, while the defense sought a life sentence arguing that spending at least 40 years in prison before becoming eligible for parole was a crushing punishment and would ensure that he lived out the rest of his life behind bars. On March 27, 1997, the jury recommended the death penalty for Guidry, after they initially deadlocked on the sentence during their two days of deliberation.

On April 16, 1997, Guidry was sentenced to death by the court.

== Post-trial developments (1998–2000) ==
Fratta's appeal to the Texas Court of Criminal Appeals was dismissed on February 18, 1999. His other appeal to the U.S. Supreme Court was dismissed on March 21, 2000.

In November 1998, Guidry and five other death row prisoners attempted to escape from prison, but the attempt failed. In February 2000, Guidry and another death row prisoner, Ponchai Wilkerson, held a female correctional officer hostage to protest against the poor living conditions for death row inmates. The hostage situation was resolved peacefully through negotiations between the inmates and anti-death penalty activists (who were invited to the prison by the prison staff) 13 hours later.

On December 16, 1999, the Texas Court of Criminal Appeals dismissed Guidry's appeal. On October 3, 2000, the U.S. Supreme Court rejected Guidry's appeal.

== Re-trials of Guidry and Fratta ==
=== Guidry's 2007 re-trial ===
On January 14, 2005, Howard Guidry was granted a re-trial, after a federal court found that the prosecution misused hearsay evidence and mishandled evidence.

On February 19, 2007, Guidry stood trial again. The original witnesses, including Prystash's girlfriend Mary Gipp and Farah's father, testified in the re-trial.

On February 23, 2007, Guidry was convicted of the original charge of capital murder.

On March 1, 2007, the jury sentenced Guidry to the death penalty.

=== Fratta's 2009 re-trial ===
On October 1, 2007, Fratta successfully appealed for a new trial after U.S. District Judge Melinda Harmon found that the prosecution's case against Fratta heavily relied on the confessions of both Prystash and Guidry, and there were questionable circumstances behind the trial procedure and conduct of the prosecution and police investigators. Harmon remanded Fratta for a re-trial. The 5th Circuit Court of Appeals upheld Harmon's ruling on July 22, 2008.

On May 5, 2009, Fratta stood trial with District Judge Belinda Hill presiding. The original trial witnesses, including Prystash's then girlfriend Mary Gipp, returned to court to testify on behalf of the prosecution and defense. Fratta's children, all of whom had changed their surnames to Baquer (the surname of their grandparents), also testified against him.

The re-trial was done without the confessions of both Guidry and Prystash, since the courts barred the prosecution from using it as evidence against Fratta.

On May 14, 2009, the jury found Fratta guilty of solicitation of capital murder.

On May 29, 2009, Fratta was sentenced to death by the jury. The defense earlier urged the jury to settle on a life sentence on behalf of Fratta's model behaviour throughout his incarceration for the past 15 years, while the prosecution continued to seek the death penalty for Fratta due to the aggravating circumstances of Farah's death.

== Post-2009 appeal process ==
Howard Guidry and Robert Fratta appealed their convictions and sentences. Joseph Prystash, who did not receive a re-trial, also went on to appeal.

On April 26, 2017, Prystash's appeal was rejected by the 5th Circuit Court of Appeals.

On January 8, 2018, the U.S. Supreme Court rejected Prystash's final appeal.

On May 1, 2018, Fratta's federal appeal was dismissed by the 5th Circuit Court of Appeals.

On January 8, 2019, Fratta's final appeal was dismissed by the U.S. Supreme Court.

On June 23, 2021, the 5th Circuit Court of Appeals turned down Guidry's appeal.

== Execution of Robert Fratta ==
In July 2022, an execution order was underway to facilitate the execution of Robert Fratta.

On October 12, 2022, a Texas judge signed the death warrant of Fratta, whose death sentence was scheduled to be carried out on January 10, 2023.

In a final bid to escape the death penalty, Fratta and two other condemned inmates scheduled for execution – Wesley Ruiz and John Balentine – filed a lawsuit, arguing that the use of expired drugs for their executions was cruel and unusual punishment in violation of their constitutional rights and several state laws. Their appeal was rejected by the Texas Court of Criminal Appeals. Sometime after the rejection of the lawsuit, Ruiz and Balentine were separately executed as scheduled on February 1 and February 8, 2023, respectively.

A final appeal was lodged to the U.S. Supreme Court. Fratta's attorneys claimed that the prosecutors had concealed evidence indicating that a witness had been hypnotized by investigators. This hypnosis caused her to alter her original statement, in which she had reported seeing two men at the murder scene along with a getaway driver. The U.S. Supreme Court ruled against the defense and dismissed Fratta's appeal, and ordered the execution to move forward. The Texas Board of Pardons and Paroles also rejected Fratta's clemency petition a week before his execution, declining to commute Fratta's death sentence to life imprisonment or grant him a 60-day temporary reprieve.

On January 10, 2023, 28 years and two months after the murder of his wife, 65-year-old Fratta was put to death by lethal injection at the Huntsville Unit. A last-minute stay of execution had been issued after District Judge Catherine Mauzy ruled that the state should not use the expired drugs to conduct Fratta's execution and those of the other plaintiffs of the prior lawsuit. This ruling was then overturned by the higher courts, allowing Fratta to be executed as scheduled; Fratta was pronounced dead at 7:49pm, 24 minutes after he was administered with a single dose of pentobarbital. Fratta did not make a final statement before his execution, which marked the first execution carried out in Texas in 2023.

Andy Kahan, the director of victim services and advocacy for Crime Stoppers of Houston, as well as Fratta's eldest son Bradley Baquer and Farah's brother Zain Baquer, attended the execution as witnesses. Kahan told the Associated Press that Farah's father died in 2018, and described Fratta as a coward for soliciting his wife's murder and not acknowledging the presence of his son or former brother-in-law, as well as not offering an apology for his actions.

== Status of the hired hitmen ==
On June 19, 2025, Joseph Prystash died on death row from unknown causes.

As of 2026, Howard Guidry remains on death row for murdering Farah Fratta.

== Aftermath ==
In 2010, the case of Farah Fratta's murder was covered by 48 Hours Mystery, a true crime series ran by CBS News.

Fratta's case was one of the few death row cases to be featured on the second season of American true crime series On Death Row in 2013.

In March 2023, two months after Fratta's execution, The Lesson Is Murder, an ABC News Studios Hulu series, re-enacted the case of Farah's murder and included the criminal profiler Bryanna Fox's analysis of the case. Interviews of Fratta before his execution were also featured, in which Fratta proclaimed he was innocent of the crime.

== See also ==
- Capital punishment in Texas
- List of death row inmates in the United States § Texas
- List of people executed in Texas, 2020–present
- List of people executed in the United States in 2023

Executions carried out in Texas
Preceded by Stephen Barbee November 16, 2022	Robert Fratta; January 10, 2023	Succeeded by Wesley Ruiz February 1, 2023
Executions carried out in the United States
Preceded by Amber McLaughlin – Missouri January 3, 2023	Robert Fratta – Texas; January 10, 2023	Succeeded by Scott Eizember – Oklahoma January 12, 2023
