= 2003 Brownsville child murders =

2003 child murder case in Brownsville, Texas

- The victims of the Brownsville attack.
- Location: Brownsville, Texas, United States
- Date: March 11, 2003
- Attack type: Murder by stabbing and decapitation
- Weapon: Knife
- Deaths: 3
- Verdict: Guilty
- Convictions: Capital murder
- Sentence: Rubio; Death; Camacho; Life imprisonment (parole eligibility after 40 years)
- Convicted: John Allen Rubio; Angela Camacho

On March 11, 2003, John Allen Rubio (August 12, 1980 – November 12, 2026) and his common-law wife Angela Camacho (born 1979) of Brownsville, Texas, United States, murdered their three young children – three-year-old Julissa Angela Quezada, one-year-old John Esteban Rubio, and two-month-old Mary Jane Rubio – by stabbing and beheading them. The couple purportedly committed the murders under financial strain and Rubio's supposed belief that the children were possessed by a malevolent entity. After their arrests, Rubio and Camacho were charged with capital murder, and after the end of their trials, Camacho was sentenced to three life sentences while Rubio was sentenced to death and executed on November 12, 2026.

== Murders ==
Prior to the murders, the parents, John Allen Rubio and Angela Camacho, first met in 2000 or 2001 when they lived in the same apartment complex. At the time, Camacho's then-live-in boyfriend, with whom she had her daughter, Julissa Quesada, had physically abused Camacho, leading to her starting a relationship with Rubio and breaking up with her former boyfriend. Camacho, who was pregnant at the time, moved in with Rubio, and brought her daughter with her. She subsequently gave birth to a son, and although the child was possibly not Rubio's, the child was named John Esteban Rubio and took on Rubio's surname, and Rubio himself treated the children as his own. At one point, the two children were placed under foster care due to Rubio abusing spray paint. The children were returned to the couple three to four months later, after Rubio found a job, though he would lose this job in December 2002, a month before the couple's biological daughter, Mary Jane Rubio, was born. To make a living for the family of five, Rubio worked in odd jobs and even worked as a male prostitute.

By March 2003, the family experienced a multitude of financial problems and could not pay the rent by the deadline of March 11, 2003, and Rubio's brother refused to allow him, Camacho and the children to move into his house. Also, Rubio's brother's girlfriend declined to loan him some money, and some $175 in cash were stolen from Rubio. Furthermore, the food stamp benefits for the children was also paused due to an issue with their paperwork, and on March 10, 2003, the day before the murders of the couple's three children, Rubio and Camacho decided that they would move the children into a homeless shelter.

On the midnight of March 11, 2003, according to the statements of the couple, due to their financial problems and Rubio's belief that the children were possessed, they chose to kill their children. Rubio purportedly believed that his late grandmother's spirit had possessed the eldest child, three-year-old Julissa Quesada, and hence choked her, before he stabbed and decapitated Quesada, and he claimed that he chopped off the head due to the girl's lips still moving and talking. Afterwards, Rubio and Camacho murdered both one-year-old John and two-month-old Mary Jane in the same manner, by stabbing and decapitating them. In Rubio's statement, he claimed that Mary Jane laughed at him and was therefore convinced that she was also possessed, while in Camacho's statement, Rubio believed John was possessed after a woman they encountered on the bus the previous day had cast a spell on John when she gave the boy a piece of candy, and Camacho herself believed it after Rubio cracked an egg in a glass of water, and the yolk floated on the water, which Rubio claimed to be a sign that the boy was possessed.

After the murders, the couple kept the children's bodies inside plastic bags and placed beside the bed. Later that day, Rubio's brother discovered the bodies and flagged down a passing police car, and the couple were thus arrested for killing the three children.

== Trials of Camacho and Rubio ==
=== Charges ===
On March 13, 2003, both Angela Camacho and John Rubio were charged with three counts of capital murder for killing the children. Under Texas state law at the time of the murders, the offence of capital murder carried the death penalty or life imprisonment with the possibility of parole after 40 years.

On April 17, 2003, a grand jury formally indicted the couple for three counts of capital murder for each of the three children, plus a fourth charge of capital murder of two or more people "in the same transaction". In May 2003, State District Judge Benjamin Euresti granted a defence motion to permit separate trials for both Camacho and Rubio.

=== Trial and sentence of Rubio ===
Rubio was the first to stand trial for the murders of the children, and jury selection commenced in September 2003. After the jury was assembled, the trial proceeded in October 2003.

On November 7, 2003, Rubio was convicted of capital murder on all three counts by the jury. Prior to his sentencing, Rubio requested for the death penalty to be meted out, and the prosecution sought the death penalty for Rubio, describing him as a "continuing threat to society".

On November 8, 2003, Rubio was sentenced to death by State District Judge Robert Garza, after all 12 members of the jury voted for the death penalty.

=== Trial of Camacho ===
Camacho was the second defendant of the case to stand trial. Before her upcoming trial, a mental competency hearing was conducted to determine whether Camacho was mentally fit to stand trial. On May 16, 2004, Camacho was found competent to stand trial. The prosecution also intended to seek the death penalty for Camacho like in the trial of Rubio; Camacho was found to be mentally competent to face a possible death sentence after a state psychiatric examination.

On June 29, 2005, Camacho was convicted of three counts of capital murder after she reached a plea agreement with the prosecution. As a result of this plea deal, the death penalty was taken off the table for Camacho, and District Judge Benjamin Euresti sentenced Camacho to three concurrent life sentences with the possibility of parole after 40 years. If the death penalty had been imposed in Camacho's case, she would have become the first woman with Mexican citizenship condemned to death row in Texas. Part of the reason behind the plea deal was due to the government of Mexico opposing the death penalty for Camacho due to her illegally entering the U.S. making her ineligible for the death penalty and they earlier expressed their intention to appeal against the death sentence should it be imposed. According to Cameron County District Attorney Armando Villalobos, removing the death penalty as an option in Camacho's trial was the "most agonizing decision" he made ever since he took office six months before the trial, but he added that it was better to make the plea bargain rather than pursuing the death penalty that might possibly be reduced to life, which saved up a potential cost of $6 million for the prosecution of Camacho.

As of 2026, Camacho remains incarcerated at the Christina Melton Crain Unit. Her earliest parole eligibility date is March 12, 2043. In the event that she is ever released, Camacho will likely be deported from the United States to Mexico, although the prosecution doubted that she would receive parole after reaching the 40-year mark of her life sentence.

== Rubio's appeals and retrial ==
On September 12, 2007, by a majority decision of 5–4, the Texas Court of Criminal Appeals overturned Rubio's murder convictions and death sentences and ordered a re-trial, after concluding that the statements from his common-law wife, Angela Camacho, were wrongfully admitted as evidence against Rubio, given that Camacho refused to testify and the defence representing Rubio did not get the chance to cross-examine her and challenge the validity of her statements. Rubio's re-trial was scheduled to begin in the fall of 2008.

In June 2010, a different jury was assembled to hear Rubio's case in his re-trial. On July 26, 2010, the jury found Rubio guilty of capital murder a second time, and he once again faced the possibility of capital punishment for murdering his children.

On July 29, 2010, Rubio was once again sentenced to death by District Judge Noe Gonzalez upon the jury's unanimous recommendation for capital punishment. Gonzalez personally addressed the defendant during sentencing, "If you want forgiveness, you're going to have to get it from a much higher source." Cameron County Assistant District Attorney Charles Mattingly remarked that there was a "special place in hell" for Rubio while expressing his agreement with the death penalty in this case.

On October 10, 2012, the Texas Court of Criminal Appeals dismissed Rubio's direct appeal against his second death sentence.

On May 23, 2018, the Texas Court of Criminal Appeals denied two appeals from Rubio.

On January 28, 2022, the Texas Court of Criminal Appeals denied Rubio's plea for a writ of habeas corpus.

In February 2022, U.S. District Judge Rolando Olvera of the U.S. District Court Southern District of Texas agreed to reopen Rubio's writ of habeas corpus case and grant him further leave to appeal his conviction.

In March 2022, Bobby Lumpkin, director of Texas Department of Criminal Justice Correctional Institutions Division, filed a motion seeking to have Judge Olvera replaced with another judge in Rubio's case, stating that the judge's prior involvement in approving Rubio to exhaust his state appeals made him eligible for disqualification from further involvement in the case. However, the U.S. District Court for the Southern District of Texas turned down the motion in April 2022. Eventually, on May 5, 2022, Judge Olvera agreed to recuse himself from the case and another judge, U.S. District Judge Fernando Rodriguez Jr., was assigned to hear the case.

On April 13, 2024, Judge Rodriguez denied Rubio's post-conviction appeal.

On May 23, 2025, the 5th Circuit Court of Appeals rejected Rubio's appeals.

On December 11, 2025, the U.S. Supreme Court heard the final appeal of Rubio, and ultimately rejected the appeal on January 12, 2026.

== Execution of John Rubio ==
On January 13, 2026, a day after John Rubio lost his final appeal to the U.S. Supreme Court, Cameron County District Attorney Luis V. Saenz filed a motion to seek an execution date for Rubio.

On February 26, 2026, John Rubio's death sentence was scheduled to be carried out nine months later on November 12, 2026, at the Huntsville Unit. Cameron County District Attorney Luis Saenz confirmed that he would witness Rubio’s execution.

On May 1, 2026, Rubio's lawyers appealed against the death sentence, claiming that Rubio was mentally incompetent to be executed for the triple murder. In response, Saenz viewed the appeal as a tactical ploy by Rubio to delay his death sentence, and stated that the community would not find closure until Rubio's execution was carried out, describing the child murders as the "most horrific case in the history of Cameron County".

On October 7, 2026, District Judge Noe Gonzalez ruled that Rubio was mentally competent to be put to death for the murders of his children.

On November 6, 2026, the Texas Court of Criminal Appeals dismissed Rubio's appeal against his sentence.

On November 12, 2026, 46-year-old John Allen Rubio was put to death by lethal injection at the Huntsville Unit. He was pronounced dead at 6:47pm.

Rubio's last words were as follows:

I would like to thank my friends and family that have been there for me for years. Thank you for giving me your love, your understanding, and everything you have shown me. I know I don't deserve to be loved by anybody, but you have shown me the love of God through all of it, thank you. I want to thank the administration for having the faith base section that has helped me to get to know God, the forgiveness of God, that anyone can be forgiven by God no matter what they have done, because that is the kind of God that we serve and have. I have grown to know him through the classes that I took, I'm not the same person I once was I am no longer naive of the things that the world thinks are right or wrong, I know what God desired for me and I have tried to live in that way. I want to say sorry to the families, my wife's family I wish I could spare you this, I'm sorry that this had to happen, it didn't have to happen, but it did. I can't change the past, but I can tell you that my life is going to be gone, and I'm going to be with God, but that's not going to make you happy. I just hope that you can get to know the love of God, that forgives everything no matter what. Give my love to Angela, I still love her very much, I will be with our kids in heaven in a little bit and I hope you can forgive me. That's it Warden.

== Aftermath ==
The 2003 Brownsville child murders remained as one of the most brutal crimes to happen in the area itself. On March 11, 2013, the tenth anniversary of the murders, multiple residents of the community gathered outside the building where the murders occurred, and conducted a memorial to remember the murdered children.

In 2016, a journalist named Laura Tillman wrote a book covering the murders, titled The Long Shadow of Small Ghosts: Murder and Memory in an American City.

In January 2016, the planning and zoning commission in Brownsville approved the demolition of the apartment building, where the murders took place, and two months later, the building was fully demolished.

In December 2017, the Tres Angeles Park was built on the former site of the apartment to commemorate the children, and three trees were planted for the children. In December 2022, local leaders and residents gathered at Tres Angeles Park to hold another memorial to remember the children.

== See also ==
- Capital punishment in Texas
- List of people executed in the United States in 2026
- List of people executed in Texas, 2020–present
