= Murder of Alexandra Flores =

Child strangulation in Texas, USA

- Location: El Paso, Texas, U.S.
- Date: November 18, 2001; 24 years ago
- Attack type: Child murder by strangulation, child abduction
- Victims: Alexandra Flores, aged 5
- Perpetrator: David Santiago Renteria
- Motive: Unknown
- Verdict: Guilty
- Convictions: Capital murder
- Sentence: Death

Alexandra Flores was a 5-year-old girl who was murdered by David Santiago Renteria (November 22, 1969 – November 16, 2023) on November 18–19, 2001, in El Paso, Texas, after being kidnapped. She was last with her parents in a local Walmart. Flores's body was found by employees of a doctor's office, naked and slightly burnt, 18 mi (29 km) away from the place of abduction.

== Cause of death ==
The medical examiner testified that Flores had two bruises to her skull, which indicated that she was struck on both sides of her head. A burned plastic bag was also found covering Flores's head. The examiner concluded that Flores died from "asphyxia due to manual strangulation" and that "she was dead when she was burned." He also found no evidence of sexual assault but did not dispel the possibility that she was touched.

== Evidence against Renteria ==
DNA sampling of the blood that was found in Renteria's van was the same as Flores's DNA.

== Background of Renteria ==
Renteria had a history with law enforcement before the Flores murder. In 1992, he was convicted of the offense of indecency with a child. In the course of the Flores trial, the victim of the 1992 incident testified that Renteria molested her at the age of 7. Renteria was a convicted sex offender on probation when he was seen on a Walmart security video leaving the store with Flores.

== Conviction ==
Renteria was convicted of capital murder and sentenced to death in September 2003. He appealed his sentence multiple times, and each time his sentence of capital murder was upheld. Renteria was executed by lethal injection on November 16, 2023, at 7:11 PM CST.

== See also ==
- List of kidnappings
- List of people executed in Texas, 2020–present
- List of people executed in the United States in 2023

Executions carried out in Texas
Preceded by Brent Ray Brewer November 9, 2023	David Santiago Renteria; November 16, 2023	Succeeded by Ivan Cantu February 28, 2024
Executions carried out in the United States
Preceded by Casey Allen McWhorter – Alabama November 16, 2023	David Santiago Renteria – Texas; November 16, 2023	Succeeded by Phillip Dean Hancock – Oklahoma November 30, 2023
