= Murder of John Edwards =

1994 murder of a college student in Florida, U.S.

John Edwards
- John Timothy Edwards, who was killed during a camping trip in 1994
- Born: John Timothy Edwards; August 9, 1975; Florida, U.S.
- Died: February 18, 1994 (aged 18); Ocala National Forest, Florida, U.S.
- Cause of death: Knife wounds to neck and head injuries
- Education: Florida State University (incomplete)
- Occupation: Student
- Known for: Victim of a kidnap-murder case

On February 18, 1994, a brother–sister pair was attacked by two men at a camping site in Ocala National Forest, Florida, United States. The attackers raped 21-year-old Pam Edwards twice and murdered her 18-year-old brother, John Timothy Edwards. Later that month, the two killers, William Christopher Paul and Loran Kenstley Cole, were arrested and charged with kidnapping, robbery, rape, and murder.

Paul pleaded guilty to the murder, kidnapping, and robbery charges, a decision that ultimately spared him the death sentence, and he was sentenced to life imprisonment. Cole, who was deemed to have played a bigger role in the murder, was sentenced to death after a state jury found him guilty of murdering Edwards and other charges that include the rape of Edwards's sister. Cole was executed by lethal injection on August 29, 2024, at the Florida State Prison in Raiford, Florida.

== Murder ==
On February 18, 1994, a brother–sister pair, John Timothy Edwards, and his sister Pam Edwards were attacked at a camping site in Ocala National Forest, Florida.

John Edwards, a Florida State University student, and his sister Pam, a Eckerd College student, met in Ocala for a camping trip. John had driven from Tallahassee while Pam arrived from St. Petersburg at their meeting point, and they headed to Ocala National Forest. While they set up camp in the Hopkins Prairie, the Edwards siblings met a man who stopped by and lent a helping hand to get the siblings settled. The man introduced himself as "Kevin", befriended the siblings, and left the campsite briefly before returning with another man while the siblings ate dinner and introduced his companion as "his brother". Both men sat with the Edwards siblings around the campfire until 10:45 p.m., when the four decided to leave and take a walk to the pond to photograph alligators. The four walked for a while but never found the pond.

At one point during the walk, Kevin jumped Pam, handcuffed her, and threw her onto the ground. John retaliated, but both men overpowered him, and he was thrown onto the ground next to Pam. Kevin's brother took Pam up the path while Kevin stayed with John, slashed his throat and battered him severely on the head. John Edwards died that night as a result of those injuries.

Meanwhile, the captors took Pam back to the campsite, and Kevin threatened to kill her if she did not have sexual intercourse with him, and raped her. The next day, Pam was raped a second time before she was gagged and tied to a tree by Kevin and his brother before they took off in one of the sibling's cars. They also stole the siblings' jewelry, money, checkbooks, and credit cards.

Two days after the attack, Pam freed herself by chewing through the rope and tried to search for her brother but could not find him. She flagged down a motorist, who helped her to make a police report. Later that day, law enforcement officers found John's body. At the time of his death, Edwards was a chemical engineering major in his first year of college and his parents, who were in the military, were based in Okinawa, Japan. Edwards’ friends and fraternity brothers from Phi Gamma Delta were shocked to hear about his murder as they remembered him as a good-looking, fun person who loved athletics and aspired to be a chemical engineer. Edwards’ father Timothy Edwards described his son as the best child he could get in the world, and the Edwards family also set up a trust fund in the name of Edwards and hoped to set up a scholarship with the money from the fund.

== Investigations and arrest ==
After the police report was lodged, authorities released composite sketches of the two killers and appealed for witnesses to assist in investigations. After receiving a tip-off from a man who saw two men resembling the sketches in the Ocala area, the police arrested the two murderers at Tuscawilla Park. Kevin's real name was Loran Kenstley Cole, a 27-year-old Iowa-born man who resided in Orlando, while his accomplice was 20-year-old William Christopher Paul, a resident of Knoxville, who was actually not Cole's brother and therefore unrelated to him by blood. Furthermore, apart from the motive of robbery, police uncovered that Cole was previously charged and convicted between 1985 and 1991 for various offences, and he was wanted in Cincinnati on a 1990 counterfeiting charge, while Paul had no previous criminal history. Marion Sheriff Ken Ergle condemned the crime in a media statement pertaining to the men's capture, stating that they were "damnable animals" for committing such horrific crimes.

Both Cole and Paul were charged with one count of murder, two counts of kidnapping, two counts of armed robbery and two counts of rape. If found guilty of first-degree murder, they would either be sentenced to death or life imprisonment under Florida law.

Paul and Cole were detained without bail at Marion County Jail in Ocala. The two men allegedly tried to escape from judicial custody in May 1994, and were seen digging at mortar around the cinder blocks in their cells, but they denied doing so.

== Perpetrators ==
=== William Christopher Paul ===
==== Early life ====
William Christopher Paul
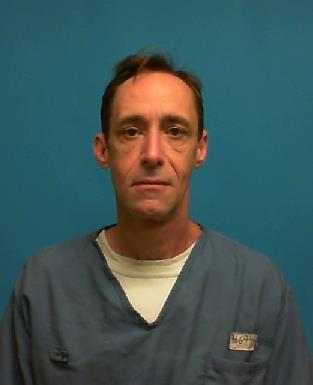
- Mugshot of William Paul
- Born: April 19, 1973 (age 53); Knoxville, Tennessee, U.S.
- Status: Incarcerated
- Motive: Robbery
- Convictions: First-degree murder Kidnapping (x2); Robbery (x2)
- Penalty: 5 concurrent life sentences with the possibility of parole after 25 years

Details
- Victims: John Edwards, 18 (deceased); Pam Edwards, 21
- Date: February 18, 1994
- Locations: Ocala National Forest, Florida
- Imprisoned at: South Florida Reception Center

William Christopher Paul was born on April 19, 1973, in Knoxville, Tennessee. An only child, Paul reportedly loved camping and would collect wildflowers for his mother.

When Paul attended Gibbs High School, he was originally a good student, but when he was in seventh grade, Paul became addicted to marijuana, and although he stopped doing so at one point after he met his first girlfriend, he fell back into his old habits after they broke up. Paul dropped out of school at 11th grade as a result of his drug addiction. Paul went to work at a nursing home, where his mother also worked, but he spent 18 months on this job and left after he "got into trouble", according to his mother, who believed her son's drug addiction was the main cause of his problems and legal troubles. Paul went to Georgia after this, although he returned to Florida and committed the murder thereafter.

==== Plea of guilt and sentencing ====
On June 30, 1995, Paul pleaded guilty to one count of first-degree murder, two armed robbery charges and two kidnapping charges. With his plea of guilt and correspondence between the prosecution and defence, the death penalty was taken off the table in Paul's case and he was given five concurrent life sentences. The Edwards family accepted this plea deal, since it prevented his sister from having to testify about the rape in two trials. The prosecution also agreed that Paul did not directly kill Edwards despite being an accomplice to murder.

During his sentencing, it was decreed that Paul would not be eligible for parole until he completed a minimum period of 25 years behind bars, based on the plea bargain. As of 2024, Paul remains incarcerated at Cross City Correctional Institution.

=== Loran Kenstley Cole ===
==== Early life ====
Loran Kenstley Cole
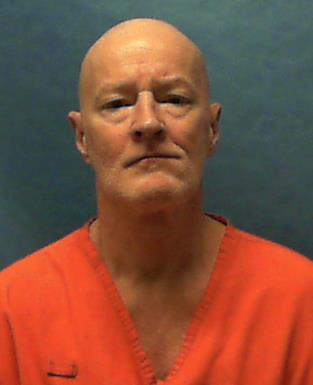
- Mugshot of Loran Kenstley Cole
- Born: November 11, 1966; Iowa, U.S.
- Died: August 29, 2024 (aged 57); Florida State Prison, Raiford, Florida, U.S.
- Status: Executed by lethal injection
- Motive: Robbery
- Convictions: First Degree Murder; Kidnapping(x2); Robbery (x2); Rape (x2)
- Penalty: Murder; Death; Rape, robbery and kidnapping 6 life sentences

Details
- Victims: John Edwards, 18 (deceased); Pam Edwards, 21
- Date: February 18, 1994
- Locations: Ocala National Forest, Florida
- Imprisoned at: Florida State Prison

Loran Kenstley Cole (alias Laran Cole, K. C. Cole and David Bryant) was born in Iowa on November 11, 1966. Cole reportedly had an unhappy childhood full of physical and emotional abuse, and his parents Don and Ann Cole reportedly suffered from alcoholism and substance abuse, neglecting him and his sisters. According to Cole's two stepsisters, Ann Marie Powers and Andrea Jane Headlee, Cole was sent to foster care more than once in his childhood and his mother had gone to prison, and that Cole's father became violent when intoxicated and had physical altercations with his wife during arguments. At the time of his arrest, Cole was divorced with one son, who resided in Ohio.

In 1984, when Cole was 17, he went to live at the Arthur G. Dozier School for Boys, where he reportedly underwent severe physical and sexual abuse by the staff during his six-month stay. Regularly, Cole was beaten at least twice a week, once raped by a guard, and on another occasion, had his legs broken by staff after trying to escape the school.

Prior to the murder of John Edwards in 1994, Cole had a criminal record of offences from 1985 to 1991 and arrested 13 times. Among these, Cole was involved in three cases of theft and burglary in 1986 and jailed. Cole was given a 5 1/2-year jail term for grand theft in 1991 but released on parole after serving only one year out of his sentence, partly due to prison overcrowding and Cole being assessed for having a low risk of reoffending. This decision was controversial given the violent nature of the murder, which Cole committed just three years after his release and it was realized that without Cole's early release, the murder of Edwards would never have happened. Since then, there were public calls against releasing dangerous offenders too early before they complete their sentences.

==== Trial and sentencing ====
On September 18, 1995, a jury selection commenced before the trial of Loran Cole, which was scheduled to begin in the following week. A motion from Cole's lawyer Don Gleason to hold separate trials for the murder charge and lesser charges of rape, abduction and robbery was denied. Cole's trial began on September 26, 1995. The prosecution had earlier confirmed they would be seeking the death penalty for Cole.

During the trial, which was presided by a 12-member jury, the prosecution argued that Cole and Paul deliberately approached the Edwards siblings, planning to rob them under the pretext of befriending them, before Cole used a wood and brass folding knife to slit the throat of John Edwards and later raped his sister. Pam Edwards testified that she grew suspicious as she heard Paul and Cole using new names with each other and behaved differently on the trail from before at the campsite. She testified that she tried to leave by taking a different path before Cole grabbed her from behind and slammed her to the ground, and her brother was also down moments later after he hit Paul. Pam said she saw the men tying up her brother and while Paul was leading her away, she heard her brother grunting as though he was being assaulted, with Cole screaming why did Edwards hit his "brother" (referring to Paul). Serologist Karen Barnes, testified that she found bloodstains on the knife, which matched Edwards's DNA, but Cole's lawyers attempted to argue that the knife was found on Paul when the arrest of both men was made, meaning that Cole did not slit the throat of Edwards.

Mary Gamble, another prosecution witness who had a one-night stand with Cole and lived with him in the past, testified that Cole admitted that he raped a woman and murdered a man, who was none other than Edwards. She recalled that Cole and Paul drove a car to her house, and while Cole claimed it belonged to his new boss, she found a receipt with Edwards's name on it inside, and put two and two together when she saw the murder of Edwards in the news. Gamble stated that in order to find out the truth, she visited Cole several times and after doing so, she learnt from Cole that he raped Edwards's sister and slit Edwards's throat, but he was uncertain on how Edwards died.

On September 29, 1995, a 12-member jury found Cole guilty of all seven charges, mainly one count of murder, two counts of kidnapping, two counts of rape and two counts of armed robbery. The day after Cole's conviction, the same jury unanimously recommended that Cole should be given the death penalty for the murder of John Edwards.

On December 21, 1995, Circuit Judge William T. Swigert formally sentenced Cole to death for murdering Edwards. Cole was simultaneously sentenced to life in prison for the other offences he committed. Cole's defence counsel reportedly urged the judge to consider Cole's troubled childhood during sentencing, but Justice Swigert aligned with the stance of the prosecution, who all described Cole as a "cold and indifferent killer".

== Cole's appeals ==
After the end of his trial, Loran Kenstley Cole appealed against his conviction and sentence all the way to the Florida Supreme Court, but the appeals were dismissed, and his death sentence was finalized in 1998.

Cole was one of four death row inmates (one of them being serial killer Daniel Conahan) to lose their respective appeals in January 2003 when the state Supreme Court rejected their appeals.

In late 2003, Cole filed an appeal for post-conviction DNA testing, claiming that the DNA evidence could show that he was not the only one who raped Edwards's sister and was not the real killer but rather it was Paul, who was still serving a life term at that point. His counsel also argued that it was unsafe to uphold either the death sentence or murder conviction, as the evidence implicating Cole in the murder was circumstantial and there was undue reliance on the testimony of Edwards's sister, who was the sole survivor, to determine the guilt of Cole, as there were risks of doing so given the rate of clarity and accuracy of her recollection and memories in this case. The prosecution, however, argued that regardless of the results, it was undisputed that Cole raped Edwards's sister and argued that his murder conviction and death sentence were safe to affirm. The lower courts, as well as the Supreme Court of Florida, dismissed the appeal of Cole in relation to the DNA testing matter, after they found that any post-conviction DNA testing granted would not have prove that Cole was not guilty of murder or rape, and as corroborated by his admission to rape.

Since 2004, for more than a decade until 2018, Cole would go on filing motions to vacate his death sentence or writs of habeas corpus (unlawful detention), but his motions were all thrown out by the courts, which all rejected his reasons to avoid the death sentence.

== Cole's death warrant ==
=== Execution order ===
On July 29, 2024, 30 years and five months after he murdered John Edwards, 57-year-old Loran Kenstley Cole was scheduled to be put to death via lethal injection on August 29, 2024, after the Florida state governor Ron DeSantis signed his death warrant.

Cole was reportedly the first inmate from Florida with his execution date set in 2024 and would be the ninth person slated for execution during DeSantis's tenure as governor of Florida; the last execution in Florida occurred on October 3, 2023, when 54-year-old Michael Duane Zack III was executed for murdering two women in 1996. After the execution date was set, the Florida Supreme Court issued an order to expedite all proceedings in the case.

=== Final appeals ===
==== State ====
After Cole's death warrant was issued, his lawyers filed appeals with hopes of staving off his upcoming execution. They raised the fact that since his stay at the age of 17, Cole was a victim of abuse at the Florida School for Boys, a reform school for troubled youths, and Cole's traumatic experiences were not being raised during his trial as factors that would have spared him the death sentence and also enable the jury to duly consider before deciding on his sentence at an earlier stage. However, the prosecution argued that these claims were already considered during his previous appeals from the past few years and were hardly new, and they were rejected by the courts in each and every past hearing regarding this matter.

On August 8, 2024, Marion County Circuit Judge Robert Hodges ruled that the arguments of Cole's lawyers should be rejected, since the evidence was not new and they were already being rejected in prior appeals before this stage. He additionally rejected that a new law compensating victims of abuse from the school should allow a fresh review of Cole's case.

A follow-up appeal was submitted to the Florida Supreme Court. Cole's lawyers argued before the Supreme Court that their client was diagnosed with Parkinson's disease and his symptoms of involuntary movements would affect the placement of intravenous lines necessary in carrying out his death sentence, and it would lead to a "substantial risk of illness by injury and needless suffering". However, this argument was already raised in their previous appeal before Justice Hodges in the lower courts of Marion County, as the judge rejected this evidence as "untimely" and without merit because Cole chose to reveal it right after the signing of his death warrant despite having significant opportunity to raise it much earlier, and it was mere speculation that he might suffer because of his involuntary body movements, in addition to his failure of showing "that medical personnel have previously had problems finding a vein in his arm or that he has previously suffered pain during the placement of an intravenous line".

On August 23, 2024, the Florida Supreme Court unanimously rejected the appeal of Cole.

==== Federal ====
On August 26, 2024, Cole appealed to the U.S. Supreme Court to delay his execution, and it also centered on the same grounds of appeal he raised before the Florida Supreme Court. Also, a group of death penalty opponents banded together to appeal to the governor to grant clemency to Cole based on the fact that he was a victim of abuse at the Dozier School and it shaped him into who he was today, and urged for mercy to take priority in this case.

In response to Cole's petition to the U.S. Supreme Court, state lawyers representing Florida argued that Cole's execution should not be halted on the grounds of Parkinson's disease. Florida Attorney General Ashley Moody stated that Cole had known about his symptoms of Parkinson's disease for at least seven years and his petition was a tactical ploy to delay the death sentence, as he never raised such claims prior to the signing of his death warrant, and no hindrance had been made for him to pursue this in any appeal he should have made before the death warrant was finalized. The U.S. Supreme Court rejected the appeal of Cole on the morning of August 29, 2024, hours before he was slated to be executed.

== Execution ==
On August 29, 2024, 57-year-old Loran Kenstley Cole was executed via lethal injection at Florida State Prison. John Edwards's family reportedly did not attend the execution of Cole. When asked if he wanted to make a final statement, Cole declined, saying, "No, sir." Cole was pronounced dead at 6:15 p.m, about 15 minutes after he was administered with the drugs.

Cole reportedly ate a last meal of pizza, M&M's, ice cream and a soda before his death sentence was carried out. Both Cole's 36-year-old son and a female pen pal paid him a last visit prior to the execution. Cole's son described the execution of his father as a nightmare and he said that bidding goodbye to his father, whom he barely knew throughout his life, was the hardest thing for him to do. Another source revealed that during his son's last prison visit before he was put to death, Cole shared his final meal with his son and the pen pal.

After the execution, the late John Edwards's parents Timothy and Victoria Edwards released a media statement, stating that the murder of their son back in 1994 was "horrendous" and "senseless" and it shattered the family. Edwards's parents did not agree with the possibility of reducing Cole's death sentence, expressing that Cole did not deserve mercy when he mercilessly killed their son and raped their daughter, who went on to become a "teacher, professor, wife and mother". Before the execution, the friends of Edwards spoke up in the media, stating that they remembered and missed Edwards, for he was a good friend with a kind soul. Many stated that the news of Cole's scheduled execution was a signal that the painful chapter of losing Edwards was coming to an end and the beginning of closure.

Cole was the first and only death row prisoner from Florida, as well as the 13th out of the 25 convicts in the U.S. to be executed during the year of 2024. Cole’s execution was the 106th execution in Florida since the U.S. Supreme Court reinstated the death penalty in 1976.

== See also ==
- Capital punishment in Florida
- List of kidnappings (1990–1999)
- List of people executed in Florida
- List of people executed in the United States in 2024

Executions carried out in Florida
Preceded by Michael Duane Zack III October 3, 2023	Loran Cole; August 29, 2024	Succeeded by James Dennis Ford February 13, 2025
Executions carried out in the United States
Preceded by Taberon Honie – Utah August 8, 2024	Loran Cole – Florida; August 29, 2024	Succeeded by Freddie Eugene Owens – South Carolina September 20, 2024
