= Execution of Alan Eugene Miller =

2024 execution by the state of Alabama via nitrogen hypoxia

Alan Eugene Miller
- Miller in a 1999 police mugshot
- Born: January 20, 1965; Billingsley, Alabama, U.S.
- Died: September 26, 2024 (aged 59); Holman Correctional Facility, Alabama, U.S.
- Cause of death: Execution by nitrogen hypoxia
- Conviction: Capital murder (3 counts)
- Penalty: Death (July 31, 2000)

Details
- Victims: Lee Michael Holdbrooks, 32; Christopher Scott Yancy, 28; Terry Lee Jarvis, 39
- Date: August 5, 1999
- Country: United States
- State: Alabama
- Imprisoned at: Holman Correctional Facility

The execution of Alan Eugene Miller (January 20, 1965 – September 26, 2024) took place in the U.S. state of Alabama by nitrogen hypoxia. It was the second execution in both the world and state to use this particular method, following the execution of Kenneth Eugene Smith in January 2024. Miller was convicted of the August 1999 murders of three men in Pelham, Alabama, and was sentenced to death in 2000.

== Crime ==
On August 5, 1999, Miller, armed with a .40-caliber Glock pistol, shot and killed two of his co-workers, 32-year-old Lee Holdbrooks and 28-year-old Christopher Yancy, at a heating and air-conditioning distributor, then drove five miles to a business where he had previously worked and shot and killed his former supervisor, 39-year-old Terry Jarvis. Holdbrooks was shot six times, Yancy was shot three times, and Jarvis was shot five times. After the shooting, Miller drove off, only to be pulled over later that day on the side of an Alabama highway after being spotted by police. It required four officers and four sets of handcuffs to subdue him. According to trial testimony, Miller's supposed motive behind the murders was that he believed the men were spreading rumors about him being gay. A psychiatrist hired by Miller's defense found he suffered from severe mental illness. At the time of the shootings, he was employed as a delivery truck driver at Ferguson Enterprises in Pelham.

== Failed execution attempt ==
Miller was scheduled to be executed via lethal injection on September 22, 2022, but his execution was called off after prison staff failed to establish intravenous access to deliver a lethal injection. It was concluded they would not be able to complete the execution by the midnight deadline. Miller filed a federal lawsuit following the failed execution attempt. In November 2022, the state of Alabama agreed it would not use lethal injection to execute Miller and would instead use nitrogen gas.

== Execution ==
Miller was executed by nitrogen hypoxia at the Holman Correctional Facility in Atmore, Alabama, on September 26, 2024. He was pronounced dead at 6:38 p.m. local time. For his last meal he had a hamburger steak, a baked potato, and french fries. His final words were, "I didn't do anything to be in here."

It marked the second time that Alabama executed a condemned inmate using nitrogen hypoxia following the execution of Kenneth Eugene Smith in January 2024. According to witness Lauren Gill, "Miller visibly struggled for roughly two minutes, shaking and pulling at his restraints. He then spent the next 5-6 min intermittently gasping for air." Alabama Corrections Commissioner John Q. Hamm said the shaking movements were anticipated. "Just like in [Kenneth Eugene] Smith we talked about there is going to be involuntarily body movements as the body is depleted of oxygen. So that was nothing we did not expect," Hamm said, explaining the nitrogen gas flowed for 15 minutes. "Everything went according to plan and according to our protocol."

Miller's execution was the 1,600th execution in the United States since the resumption of executions in 1976. He was the last of five inmates to be executed across the United States in the span of one week, the most inmates executed within a week since July 2003. The others were Freddie Eugene Owens in South Carolina on September 20, Marcellus Williams in Missouri and Travis Mullis in Texas on September 24, and Emmanuel Littlejohn in Oklahoma on the morning of September 26.

== See also ==
- Capital punishment in Alabama
- Capital punishment in the United States
- List of botched executions
- List of people executed in Alabama
- List of people executed in the United States in 2024

Executions by nitrogen hypoxia in the United States
Preceded by Kenneth Eugene Smith – Alabama January 25, 2024	Alan Eugene Miller – Alabama; September 26, 2024	Succeeded by Carey Dale Grayson – Alabama November 21, 2024
Executions carried out in Alabama
Preceded by Keith Edmund Gavin July 18, 2024	Alan Eugene Miller; September 26, 2024	Succeeded by Derrick Dearman October 17, 2024
Executions carried out in the United States
Preceded by Emmanuel Littlejohn – Oklahoma September 26, 2024	Alan Eugene Miller – Alabama; September 26, 2024	Succeeded by Garcia Glen White – Texas October 1, 2024
