= Richard Bernard Moore =

American convicted murderer (1965–2024)

- 2021 mugshot of Moore
- Born: February 20, 1965; Detroit, Michigan, U.S.
- Died: November 1, 2024 (aged 59); Broad River Correctional Institution, South Carolina, U.S.
- Status: Executed by lethal injection
- Convictions: Murder; Assault with intent to kill Assault and battery of a high and aggravated nature Armed robbery Burglary; Possession of a firearm during commission of a violent crime
- Penalty: Death (October 22, 2001)

Details
- Victims: James Mahoney, 42
- Date: September 16, 1999
- Country: United States
- State: South Carolina
- Imprisoned at: Broad River Correctional Institution

Richard Bernard Moore (February 20, 1965 – November 1, 2024) was an American man who was executed in South Carolina by lethal injection for murder. He was convicted of the September 1999 murder of James Mahoney, a convenience store clerk, in Spartanburg, South Carolina. In 2022, Moore's case received international attention when he was scheduled for execution and opted to be executed by firing squad under the state's new capital punishment laws. He was set to become the first person executed in South Carolina in over a decade and the first to be executed by firing squad in the state. However, his execution was stayed by the South Carolina Supreme Court on April 20, 2022.

In September 2024, South Carolina resumed executions. Freddie Eugene Owens, executed by lethal injection, became the first person to be executed by the state in over thirteen years. On November 1, 2024, Moore was also executed by lethal injection, becoming the second person executed since executions resumed. Although Moore had selected the firing squad as his preferred method of execution in 2022, he ultimately chose lethal injection as his preferred method in 2024. Ultimately, the first person in South Carolina to be executed by firing squad was Brad Sigmon on March 7, 2025.

== Early life ==
Moore was born on February 20, 1965, and grew up in Detroit, Michigan. He struggled with drug addiction and turned to robbery to support his drug habit. In the 1980s, he was convicted of burglary and weapons charges. In 1991, he moved with his partner, Lynda Byrd, from Michigan to Spartanburg, South Carolina. The two later had two children together.

In 1991, Moore punched Michelle Crowder in the neck while trying to steal her purse in Spartanburg, then kicked her repeatedly in the head and back after she fell on the purse. When Crowder's fiancé came to help her, Moore beat the man so severely that he had to be hospitalized. Crowder would later testify at the sentencing phase of Moore's murder trial.

Another Spartanburg resident, Valerie Wisniewski, said that Moore robbed her as she was working in a shoe store. In 1997, Moore also pleaded guilty to assault and battery of a high and aggravated nature for attacking a woman.

== Crime ==
On September 16, 1999, in the early hours, Moore entered Nikki's, a convenience store in Spartanburg. He was unarmed and was intending to rob the store to support his cocaine addiction. Inside the store was the clerk, 42-year-old James Mahoney, and an eyewitness to the crime, Terry Hadden. As Hadden played on a video poker machine, he saw Moore walk toward the cooler inside the store. He then heard Mahoney shout at Moore and ask him what he was doing. Hadden turned to see Moore and Mahoney in a brawl, with Moore holding both of Mahoney's hands with just one of his. Mahoney had pulled a gun on Moore and the two got into a scuffle, with Moore taking hold of the weapon with his other hand. Moore turned his attention to Hadden and pointed the gun at him, telling him not to move.

Moore then tried to shoot Hadden, but missed. Hadden fell to the floor, pretending to be dead. Mahoney then pulled out a second gun and several more shots were fired. Mahoney shot Moore in the arm while Moore shot Mahoney in the chest. After Moore paced around the store leaving a trail of blood behind him, he fled the store and drove off in his pickup truck. Hadden then got up and saw Mahoney lying face down on the floor, with a gun lying near his hand. Hadden called the police but Mahoney died minutes later from the gunshot wound to the chest. Moore stole $1,408 from the store.

After Moore left the store, Deputy Bobby Rollins, who was on the lookout for him, heard a loud bang as he was patrolling the area. Moore had backed his pickup truck into a telephone pole approximately one and a half miles away from the crime scene. As Rollins approached the vehicle, he saw Moore sitting in the back of the truck bleeding from the gunshot wound to his left arm. As Rollins shouted at him to surrender, Moore confessed to the crime. The stolen money was found in a bag covered in blood in the front seat of the truck. The weapon that Moore had taken from Mahoney was later found on a nearby highway shortly before dawn. Moore was taken to Spartanburg hospital where he was treated for his injuries. He was then transported to the Spartanburg County jail where he was charged with armed robbery, assault and battery with intent to kill, and murder.

== Trial and appeals ==
Moore was tried for shooting and killing Mahoney in October 2001. He was charged with murder, assault with intent to kill, armed robbery, and a firearms violation.

At trial, Moore claimed he shot Mahoney in self-defense after Mahoney drew the first gun. Moore entered the store unarmed and took the gun from Mahoney, with his lawyers arguing that because he did not bring a weapon into the store, he was therefore not intending to kill someone when he walked in.

A controversial aspect of Moore's trial was that the jury that convicted him included no African Americans. According to the Associated Press, Moore was the only person on South Carolina's death row to have experienced this.

The jury found him guilty on all counts and he was convicted. In a subsequent sentencing proceeding, the jury recommended a sentence of death. Moore was sentenced to death for the murder of Mahoney on October 22, 2001.

== Execution attempts and stay orders ==
Following Moore's sentence, he was scheduled for execution on January 22, 2002, by Circuit Judge Gary Clary. Prosecutors acknowledged at the time, however, that it would take years of appeals before Moore would actually be executed.

After running out of appeals, Moore was scheduled to be executed on December 4, 2020. However, the state was unable to execute him as they did not have the lethal injection drugs required to do so. Moore was given the choice to die by either lethal injection or the electric chair. He declined to pick either method, meaning he was set to die by the primary method of lethal injection. As the state did not have the drugs available, his execution was stayed.

Following this, lawmakers in South Carolina pushed to add the option of execution by firing squad, in an attempt to resume executions, after a failure to get the drugs needed for lethal injection. A bill, approved by a 66–43 vote, gave inmates the choice to die by electrocution or firing squad if lethal injection drugs were unavailable. In March 2022, the state announced it had finished developing protocols for executions by firing squad.

Moore was scheduled to be executed on April 29, 2022. On April 15, he chose to be executed by firing squad instead of the electric chair. On April 20, the South Carolina Supreme Court halted the execution and issued a temporary stay. At the time, the South Carolina Supreme Court did not explain why they granted Moore's request for a stay, but said they would elaborate later. Prior, Moore's attorneys had filed litigation challenging whether South Carolina's execution methods, including the electric chair, were unconstitutional or not, as well as whether Moore's sentence was appropriately harsh given the details of the crime; the results of both lawsuits were still pending at the time of Moore's April 29 scheduled execution. On July 31, 2024, the court ruled the execution methods of firing squad and electrocution are constitutional, which paved the way for a possible resumption of executions for Moore and the remaining inmates on death row in South Carolina.

On August 28, 2024, Freddie Eugene Owens, another inmate on death row in South Carolina, had his execution scheduled to be carried out on September 20, 2024. Moore and another four death row inmates were next in line for execution on later dates to be decided, with a court order issued for the five of them to be put to death five weeks apart. Owens's execution via lethal injection was subsequently carried out as scheduled, which ended the 13-year moratorium on the state's capital punishment.

== 2024 death warrant and execution ==
On October 4, 2024, Moore's new death warrant was issued, scheduling him to be executed on November 1, 2024. Moore was given two weeks to select whether he should be put to death via firing squad, electrocution, or lethal injection. If he did not elect a method, the state would execute him via electric chair. On October 18, 2024, Moore chose lethal injection as his method of execution.

Moore filed an appeal, challenging the South Carolina governor's sole right to grant clemency. He stated that as a former prosecutor, the incumbent governor Henry McMaster could not impartially make a decision on whether to grant clemency to a death row inmate awaiting execution, and this matter should be decided by the state parole board instead of the governor. This was rejected by a federal judge, who ruled that the governor of South Carolina should have the sole prerogative to grant or refuse clemency to death row inmates.

Additionally, a clemency campaign was conducted to seek the commutation of Moore's death sentence to life imprisonment. Moore's son, Lyndall Moore, asked the governor to spare his father's life, stating that his father was a changed man and that he never intended to cause death when he only had robbery in his mind. Lyndall, who was only five when his father was arrested for the murder of James Mahoney, stated that he and his siblings only knew about his father's crime as he grew older. He remembered Moore as a normal person who wished and tried to be a good father and stated that Moore grew up in southeast Michigan with a normal childhood until he fell into bad company as a result of drugs. Moore himself actively took steps to build a close bond with his son while in prison. It was further revealed that Moore's conduct while in prison was consistently good and he never broke any rules except for just two minor incidents. Moore's daughter, Alexandria, who was married with two children, also stated that her father had repented and she hoped that her father's life would be spared since he had spent his time on death row making an effort to bring positive influence with people he bonded with during his incarceration.

On October 28, 2024, the U.S. Supreme Court heard a final appeal from Moore, who sought to put his execution on hold. He raised allegations that his trial as an African American defendant was processed with a jury filled with 11 white people and one Hispanic juror, that the prosecution allegedly removed African American prospective jurors from the jury selection, and that it potentially undermined the integrity and impartiality of a capital trial. In turn, this undermined the public confidence in the criminal justice system. The U.S. Supreme Court later declined to issue a stay of execution for Moore, allowing the execution to move forward. As a final recourse to escape the death penalty, Moore filed for clemency from the governor.

Retired Circuit Court Judge Gary Clary, who sentenced Moore to death in 2001, and two former jurors banded together to petition for clemency from the governor after they agreed that Moore was a changed man and acknowledged the extensive rehabilitation efforts he undertook during his incarceration. They believed that he did not deserve to be executed. Former Corrections Director Jon Ozmint, who was a huge supporter of capital punishment, stated that he found Moore to be "one of several reliable and respected inmates on the row", and in comparison with those who served life terms for crimes more heinous than his own, Moore was not among the worst of worst offenders where he deserved the death penalty. Ozmint asked that Moore's death sentence be commuted to life imprisonment. McMaster chose not to grant clemency to Moore.

Moore was executed by lethal injection at the Broad River Correctional Institution on November 1, 2024. He was pronounced dead at 6:24 p.m. Moore's last meal was a steak cooked medium, fried catfish and shrimp, scalloped potatoes, green peas, broccoli with cheese, sweet potato pie, German chocolate cake, and grape juice.

== See also ==
- Capital punishment in South Carolina
- List of people executed in South Carolina
- List of people executed in the United States in 2024

Executions carried out in South Carolina
Preceded by Freddie Eugene Owens September 20, 2024	Richard Bernard Moore; November 1, 2024	Succeeded by Marion Bowman Jr. January 31, 2025
Executions carried out in the United States
Preceded by Derrick Ryan Dearman – Alabama October 17, 2024	Richard Bernard Moore – South Carolina; November 1, 2024	Succeeded by Carey Dale Grayson – Alabama November 21, 2024
