= Murder of Nancy Adleman =

1997 murder of a female jogger in Texas, U.S.

On July 29, 1997, in Houston, Texas, 48-year-old Nancy Adleman, a mother of three, was abducted and murdered while jogging. Her body was found in a forested area along Brays Bayou the day after she failed to return home. Adleman's murderer, Arthur Lee Burton, was later arrested and charged with her murder. Burton confessed that he had kidnapped and attempted to rape Adleman, ultimately strangling her with her own shoelaces. Although Burton later retracted his confession, claiming he admitted to the crime under duress and had an intellectual disability, he was found guilty of murder and sentenced to death in 1998. Burton was executed at age 54 on August 7, 2024.

== Disappearance and murder ==
=== Death of Adleman ===
On the evening of July 29, 1997, in Houston, Texas, a female jogger was abducted and later found murdered the day after her disappearance.

Nancy Adleman, a 48 year-old mother of three children, would normally jog around the area near her house. On that evening, Adleman did not return home after she went out for her evening jog. Adleman's body was found a day later at a nearby wooded area along Brays Bayou, with her shorts and underwear forcibly removed and discarded nearby her corpse, indicating that she had been sexually assaulted. Several bruises around her body also showed that Adleman was presumably beaten by her attacker, and a medical report also confirmed Adleman had been strangled to death with her own shoelace.

Background information revealed that Nancy Jean Buquoi, later known as Nancy Adleman after her marriage, was the eldest of three children who grew up in East Baton Rouge, Louisiana. Adleman completed a degree in theatre from Louisiana State University and a master of fine arts from the University of Minnesota, before she moved to Houston in the late 1970s. Adleman was said to have begun writing poetry at age 11, and dabbled in theatrical work and worked as a playwright before her death. Adleman was survived by two sons and one daughter and her husband at the time she died.

=== Investigations and arrest of killer ===
The police investigated the death of Adleman as murder, and during their investigations, a witness told the police that shortly after the timing when Adleman left her house for her jog, she saw an angry-looking man standing near her house on a bicycle, and the man even cast the witness a mean expression at one point, and he left sometime after Adleman passed by her house.

The man was eventually identified, and ten days after the murder, 27-year-old Arthur Lee Burton – a cement finisher married with four children – was brought in for questioning by the police. During his interrogation by Deputy Sheriff Benjamin Beall, Burton denied that he ever rode a bicycle along the area jogged by Adleman, and he additionally denied killing Adleman. Eventually, after the police obtained evidence that did not square up with Burton's story and revealed numerous inconsistencies in Burton's testimony, Burton confessed that he was responsible for the murder of Adleman, and thus, he was arrested for the crime.

== Trial of Arthur Lee Burton ==
=== Background ===
Arthur Lee Burton
- Arthur Lee Burton prior his execution.
- Born: March 29, 1970; Bastrop, Louisiana, U.S.
- Died: August 7, 2024 (aged 54); Huntsville Unit, Texas, U.S.
- Cause of death: Execution by lethal injection
- Motive: Rape
- Conviction: Capital murder
- Penalty: Death

Details
- Victims: Nancy Adleman, 48
- Date: July 29, 1997
- Location: Houston, Texas
- Imprisoned at: Huntsville Unit

Born on March 29, 1970, Arthur Lee Burton grew up in a dysfunctional family background. Burton, who had at least one brother, never got to know his father, who was often absent throughout their lives, and the children sometimes had to live without food or electricity. After reaching adulthood, Burton was married with three children and one stepchild, and according to his wife and mother, Burton was a good and hardworking father and husband who liked building things.

Court records showed that when he was 18, Burton had committed 39 burglaries in a single month and together with his accomplices, Burton had stolen various items like guns, radios, fishing equipment and calculators. Burton's brother, Michael Burton, testified in 2002 that his brother was only 16 when he began to consume marijuana, and he became involved in cocaine trafficking at age 17.

=== Trial and sentencing ===
On October 31, 1997, a Harris County jury indicted Arthur Burton for the murder of Nancy Adleman. As the charge itself was pertaining to an act of capital murder committed during or while attempting to commit kidnapping and/or aggravated sexual assault, Burton would face the death penalty if found guilty of capital murder.

Burton stood trial in June 1998 for the killing of Adleman. The jury and court were told that on the date of Adleman's death, Burton had kidnapped Adleman after encountering her along the footpath of White Oak Bayou, and he forced Adleman into a nearby forest and was attempting to rape her. However, during the process, Burton strangled Adleman to death with her own shoelaces after she screamed and resisted. Afterwards, he fled the scene on foot, leaving Adleman's body behind. However, in his defence, Burton claimed that he did not give his confession voluntarily, as the police investigators physically abused and coerced him into admitting to the crime, although prosecutors and the police rebutted that Burton had provided details that only the real killer would know, which showed that he was indeed guilty of the murder of Adleman.

During that same month, Burton was found guilty of murdering Adleman as charged, and on June 23, 1998, the same jury that convicted Burton returned with their decision on sentence after a week of deliberation, sentencing Burton to death for the charge of capital murder.

On September 16, 1998, Burton was formally sentenced to death during an official sentencing hearing. At the point of Burton's sentencing, the state of Texas garnered attention for having notched a total of 155 executions – including 53 in Harris County (where Burton was convicted of Adleman's murder) – since the 1976 resumption of capital punishment in the U.S., and the cases of both Burton and mass killer Coy Wayne Wesbrook were among the most recent high-profile death penalty cases that took place in Harris County.

== Appeal process ==
After his sentencing in 1998, Arthur Burton appealed against his death sentence. On March 7, 2001, three years after he was condemned to death row, Burton's conviction was affirmed by the Texas Court of Criminal Appeals, but the same court vacated Burton's death sentence and remanded the case to the lower trial courts for re-sentencing.

On September 6, 2002, a re-trial on sentence concluded with a different jury once again imposing the death penalty for Burton. The defence earlier implored the jury to spare Burton's life on account of his children, whom they stated required the presence of their father in their lives despite Burton's incarceration and pushed for a life sentence, but the prosecution urged the jury to reinstate the death penalty since the slaying of Adleman was a "premeditated, cold-blooded, senseless and remorseless killing" and Burton's conduct did not deserve mercy.

On May 19, 2004, through an unpublished decision, the Texas Court of Criminal Appeals upheld the murder conviction and death sentence of Burton.

On June 18, 2008, Burton filed a third appeal to the Texas Court of Criminal Appeals, but it was rejected.

On April 1, 2009, a fourth appeal by Burton was dismissed by the Texas Court of Criminal Appeals.

On May 29, 2012, District Judge David Hittner of the U.S. District Court for the Southern District of Texas turned down Burton's appeal against his death sentence.

On October 28, 2013, the 5th Circuit Court of Appeals rejected Burton's appeal.

On June 9, 2014, the U.S. Supreme Court refused to hear Burton's appeal and confirmed his death sentence and murder conviction.

== Final appeals and execution ==
On May 1, 2024, a death warrant was authorized for Arthur Burton, scheduling him to be executed on August 7, 2024.

After the death warrant was issued, Burton filed a final series of appeals in a bid to escape the death penalty. One of the grounds of appeal was that under a landmark law, the U.S. banned the execution of intellectually disabled offenders, and Burton should be exempted from execution due to medical reports that showed he was intellectually disabled. In response, the prosecution argued that Burton had not raised these claims in any of his previous appeals and a report by a medical expert representing the Harris County District Attorney's Office revealed that Burton's writing and reading abilities were "fall generally at or higher than the average U.S. citizen", which was inconsistent with the symptoms of people who were intellectually disabled.

On the morning of August 7, 2024, just hours before the scheduled execution, the U.S. Supreme Court declined to intervene in Burton's case and allowed the execution to move forward. They rejected the claims of Burton's lawyers that he had an intellectual disability that would have precluded him from execution.

On that same day, 54-year-old Arthur Lee Burton was put to death via lethal injection at the Huntsville Unit. Burton was pronounced dead at 6:47pm, 24 minutes after the drugs were administered to him. Burton was the third condemned criminal from Texas and also the 11th inmate in the U.S. to be executed during the year of 2024, and his death sentence was carried out just less than 12 hours before the execution of Taberon Honie in Utah.

In his final words before his execution, Burton apologized to the people he hurt with his actions, including the family members of Adleman, and also said, "Bird is going home."

== Aftermath ==
In 2019, Sarah Adleman, the daughter of the murder victim Nancy Adleman, published a book titled The Lampblack Blue of Memory: My Mother Echoes, in which it recorded some of her mother's poetry works and her story of dealing with her grief of losing her mother.

In response to Arthur Burton's scheduled execution in 2024, Sarah accepted an interview and said that ever since her mother's murder, her father, who would be attending the execution with one of her two brothers, was never the same after that tragedy and he continued to struggle with the grief of losing Adleman. Sarah stated that while she would not witness Burton's execution or celebrate it, she wanted closure and hoped to continue remembering her mother in fond memory, and she also held a "gratitude and forgiveness ceremony" in memory of Adleman at a local river ahead of the execution of Burton.

== See also ==
- Capital punishment in Texas
- List of kidnappings (1990–1999)
- List of people executed in Texas, 2020–present
- List of people executed in the United States in 2024

Executions carried out in Texas
| Preceded by Ramiro Felix Gonzales June 26, 2024 | Arthur Lee Burton; August 7, 2024 | Succeeded by Travis James Mullis September 24, 2024 |
Executions carried out in the United States
| Preceded by Keith Edmund Gavin – Alabama July 18, 2024 | Arthur Lee Burton – Texas; August 7, 2024 | Succeeded by Taberon Honie – Utah August 8, 2024 |
