= Garcia White =

American murderer and suspected serial killer (1963–2024)

Garcia Glen White
- Undated mugshot of White
- Born: February 4, 1963; Houston, Texas, U.S.
- Died: October 1, 2024 (aged 61); Huntsville Unit, Texas, U.S.
- Status: Executed by lethal injection
- Conviction: Capital murder
- Penalty: Death

Details
- Victims: 3 convicted, 5 total suspected
- Span of crimes: 1989–1995
- Country: United States
- State: Texas
- Date apprehended: July 1995
- Imprisoned at: Allan B. Polunsky Unit, West Livingston, Texas

Garcia Glen White (February 4, 1963 – October 1, 2024) was an American murderer, rapist, and suspected serial killer. He was convicted and sentenced to death for the 1989 triple murder of a woman and her two teenage daughters in Houston, Texas, and is also the prime suspect in two additional murders with which he was never charged.

== Early life ==
Garcia Glen White was born on February 4, 1963, in Houston, Texas, as one of several siblings. He attended the Wheatley High School, where he was noted for his love for football, and later continued his studies at the Lubbock Christian University. A knee injury prematurely ended his career, after which White had to drop out and work menial jobs as a fry cook, house painter, and sandblaster. Shortly after this, he also developed a drug addiction that would lead him to become more violent.

== Murders ==
During the autumn of 1989, White went to a crack house in Houston, where he had an argument with a 27-year-old prostitute named Greta Williams. In the ensuing scuffle, Williams was beaten to death, but White was not connected to this crime at the time.

After this, he began visiting another crack house - an apartment in northeast Houston occupied by 38-year-old Bonita Edwards, a jobless widow with twin 16-year-old daughters, Bernette and Annette. The apartment was frequently used as a safe area for drug users, much to the dismay of Edwards' daughters, who had attempted to move in with their grandmother out of fear. On November 30, White went to the apartment intending to use drugs and have sex with Bonita, but became angry when she refused. He then pulled out a knife and stabbed her multiple times, alarming her two daughters. He then went to the bedroom, where he sexually assaulted Annette before stabbing her in the chest and slashing her throat, then proceeding to the bathroom, where he did the same with Bernette. After killing the girls, White partially covered Annette's body with a blanket and then shoved a towel inside Bernette's mouth, before leaving as quickly as possible.

The bodies remained undiscovered until December 2, when Edwards' concerned boyfriend, King Solomon, went to the apartment to check on them. When nobody answered the door, he asked the neighbors if they had seen Edwards or her daughters, and when they replied in the negative, he asked the maintenance man to open the door. Upon opening it, Solomon found Bonita and Bernette's bodies lying on the floor and immediately notified the police. An investigation of the crime scene determined that there had been no forced entry, indicating that the victims likely knew their killer, but interviews with neighbors did not reveal any useful information. Despite extensive investigations, no viable suspects were identified and the triple murder remained a cold case for six years.

== Arrest and confessions ==
In July 1995, White and an acquaintance named Tecumseh Manuel attempted to rob a convenience store in Houston, resulting in the death of the clerk, Hai Van Pham. Both men were arrested for the murder, but during interrogation, Manuel told investigators that White had supposedly confessed to him that he had murdered the Edwards family in 1989. As a result, he was put under questioning for the triple murder, and while White initially denied involvement, he admitted responsibility after a portion of Manuel's interview was presented to him.

According to him, he and a friend, Terrence Moore, went to Bonita's apartment intending to have sex and do drugs, but the two were reproached by her when they refused to share the drugs with her. Moore then proceeded to stab Bonita, causing her daughters to go out of their rooms to check on her. White and Moore then supposedly grabbed one of them each - with White confessing that he fondled and ejaculated on one victim - before Moore took his time stabbing both victims. After finishing them off, the pair left. In spite of his claims, however, investigators determined that Moore had died four months prior to the murders, and when confronted with this, White admitted that he had made the story up and that he was solely responsible. Subsequent DNA and serology tests identified his semen and blood samples at the crime scenes, cementing his guilt.

== Trial and appeals ==
On May 28, 1996, White was indicted by a grand jury for the murders of Bernette and Annette, as the sexual assault on both of them could carry a death sentence. Two months later, he was found guilty and sentenced to death. He repeatedly attempted to appeal his sentence but each attempt was unsuccessful. In 2004, the DNA tests conducted by the Houston Police Department's crime lab came under scrutiny due to its troubled past and the fact that a private company was unable to replicate the results. This came in the midst of an investigation into the crime lab's record due to its high rate of inaccuracies and insufficient evidence. After the investigation ended, no viable evidence was located to justify a commutation of White's sentence.

In April 2014, the 180th District Court of Harris County set an execution date of January 28, 2015. In response, his attorneys filed an appeal challenging the motion, claiming that their client's pristine incarceration record, his childhood trauma, and low intelligence should be reason enough to have his sentence commuted. In addition, they questioned the legitimacy of his videotaped confession and the DNA testing, alleging that samples obtained from the blanket indicated that another man had been present at the crime scene. On January 27, a day prior to his execution, White's case was stayed by the Texas Court of Criminal Appeals, to review new claims made by White's attorneys. This appeal was later resolved in favor of the state and Harris County District Attorney Kim Ogg's office then filed a motion for a new execution order. Subsequently 180th District Court Judge DaSean Jones entered an execution order scheduling White's execution for October 1, 2024.

== Execution ==
White was executed by lethal injection at the Huntsville Unit, on October 1, 2024, at the age of 61.

== See also ==
- Capital punishment in Texas
- Capital punishment in the United States
- List of people executed in the United States in 2024
- List of people executed in Texas, 2020–present
- List of serial killers in the United States

Executions carried out in Texas
Preceded by Travis James Mullis September 24, 2024	Garcia Glen White; October 1, 2024	Succeeded by Steven Lawayne Nelson February 5, 2025
Executions carried out in the United States
Preceded by Alan Eugene Miller – Alabama September 26, 2024	Garcia Glen White – Texas; October 1, 2024	Succeeded by Derrick Ryan Dearman – Alabama October 17, 2024
