= Murder of Bridget Townsend =

2001 murder of a teenage girl in Texas

Bridget Townsend
- Townsend aged 18
- Born: Bridget Fay Townsend; June 26, 1982; Houston, Texas, U.S.
- Died: January 15, 2001 (aged 18); Medina County, Texas, U.S.
- Cause of death: Fatal gunshot wounds
- Known for: Murder victim

On January 15, 2001, 18-year-old Bridget Fay Townsend (June 26, 1982 – January 15, 2001) disappeared from the home of her boyfriend, a drug dealer in Bandera County, Texas. Townsend was missing for more than a year before Ramiro Felix Gonzales (November 5, 1982 – June 26, 2024), who was serving two consecutive life terms for a September 2001 abduction-rape case, confessed to her murder. He had kidnapped and raped Townsend at his family ranch in Texas, where he fatally shot her.

Townsend's body was found in October 2002 at a field in Southwest Texas. Gonzales, who was 18 years old at the time of the murder, was found guilty of the murder and sentenced to death in 2006. After spending close to 18 years on death row, Gonzales was executed by lethal injection on June 26, 2024, despite calls for clemency and a medical expert's recant of his original testimony that Gonzales was a great danger to society.

== Disappearance and murder ==
On January 15, 2001, in a rural part of Bandera County near San Antonio, Texas, 18-year-old Townsend was alone at the home of her boyfriend, a drug dealer named Joe Leal, when 18-year-old Ramiro Felix Gonzales intruded with hopes of stealing cocaine from Leal's house. Leal was Gonzales' drug dealer. Gonzales saw Townsend after entering the house, and after she attempted to call Leal, he overpowered her, tied her up, and stole cash, but was unable to find any drugs.

After ransacking the house, Gonzales forced Townsend into his truck and drove away, and returned to his grandfather's ranch in neighboring Medina County, Texas. Townsend asked for mercy, though was raped by Gonzales, who subsequently fatally shot her with a hunting rifle. Gonzales abandoned her body at a field in Southwest Texas, near the small Texas town of Bandera.

Townsend, who was reported missing, was not found for more than a year. Gonzales was arrested eight months later for an unrelated kidnapping and rape of a woman named Florence Teich in September 2001. He was later convicted and given two consecutive life sentences for the crime.

A year later while serving his sentence, Gonzales asked to speak with the sheriff, James MacMilliam, and told him he knew the fate of Townsend. Although MacMilliam did not initially believe Gonzales's story, he was later convinced that Gonzales was involved after he gave further details on where Townsend's body could be found. In October 2002, the authorities discovered Townsend's skeletal remains after Gonzales led them to where he abandoned the body.

Although Gonzales fabricated evidence to blame other people, including Townsend's boyfriend and a fictitious Mexican gang, and initially stated he only helped dispose of the body or received orders to kill Townsend, he eventually claimed sole responsibility for the kidnapping, rape and murder of Townsend.

== Murder trial ==
=== Background of Ramiro Gonzales ===
Born in Frio County, Texas on November 5, 1982, Ramiro Felix Gonzales was raised by his grandparents due to the negligence of his mother. Gonzales's mother, who was 17 years old when giving birth to her son, struggled with severe drug addiction and alcoholism, and continued to do so while pregnant with Gonzales; she tried to overdose on drugs to induce a miscarriage. Gonzales did not meet his father until he was 19 years old and they were both incarcerated together. Gonzales formerly worked as a fence builder and welder before his arrest for murder.

According to court records, Gonzales was allegedly a victim of sexual abuse by his cousin at age 4 or 6, and similarly fell victim to sexual assault by an older woman at age 12 or 13. Gonzales reportedly did not perform well in school and despite being certified to have a normal brain, his school records assessed him to be "developmentally delayed". Gonzales began to pick up the harmful habits of underage drinking and drug consumption when he was 11 years old.

=== Murder conviction and death penalty ===
After his confession, Gonzales was arrested and charged with capital murder, an offence that warrants the death penalty under Texas state law upon conviction.

Gonzales stood trial before a Medina County jury in August 2006 for the murder of Townsend. The defence, in their request for life imprisonment, brought up Gonzales's family history and sought mercy on humanitarian grounds, also saying that Gonzales was suffering from brain damage because of his mother's consumption of drugs and alcohol while pregnant with him. The prosecution called experts who refuted that Gonzales had neither any major mental health issues nor brain damage, and state psychiatric experts submitted that based on their assessments, Gonzales showed a strong propensity to re-offend and based on this, the prosecution sought the death penalty for Gonzales. In 2022, the expert psychiatrist who testified that Gonzales was a danger to society recanted his original assessment, saying that he based his decision on a now discredited 1986 study on recidivism, and that he no longer believed Gonzales was a threat to society.

The jury returned with their verdict, unanimously convicting Gonzales of capital murder and sentencing him to death.

== Appeals and execution attempts ==
On June 17, 2009, the Texas Court of Criminal Appeals rejected Ramiro Gonzales' direct appeal against his death sentence and murder conviction. On February 1, 2012, Gonzales's second appeal to the Texas Court of Criminal Appeals was dismissed, but the matter was remanded to the lower courts for re-hearing of some grounds of appeal in Gonzales's case. On April 10, 2015, the 5th Circuit Court of Appeals rejected Gonzales's appeal against his death sentence. In December 2015, the U.S. Supreme Court rejected Gonzales's final appeal and afterwards, a death warrant was issued on May 3, 2016, with Gonzales set to be executed on August 10, 2016. However, it was delayed for legal reasons. On September 17, 2019, the 5th Circuit Court of Appeals rejected another appeal from Gonzales.

Eventually, Gonzales's execution was rescheduled to occur on July 13, 2022. However, the execution date was staved off a second time, after he was granted a stay of execution pending an appeal. Gonzales had submitted that he wished to donate a kidney as an altruistic donor to an unknown recipient, to atone for having murdered Townsend.

Edward Gripon, the psychiatrist whose testimony helped originally secure the death penalty for Gonzales, reversed his position, giving grounds for appeal which was pursued by Gonzales's lawyers to seek clemency or a reprieve from the death penalty. Gripon stated that not only had he relied on now discredited research to come to the conclusion that Gonzales was a danger to society, he had also relied on written statements from Gonzales's cellmate Frederick Ozuna. Ozuna later recanted these statements, and wrote a sworn declaration that an officer had threatened him with a harsher sentence unless he implicated Gonzales in the crime. Gripon stated that his initial conclusion that Gonzales was a future risk to society was wrong in light of Gonzales's rehabilitation process and clean prison behavioral record. Another ground of appeal was that Gonzales accused the prison authorities for violating his religious freedom due to them not allowing his spiritual advisor to hold his hands during the execution procedure.

== 2024 death warrant and execution ==
Two years after his execution was stayed, in 2024, a third death warrant was issued for Ramiro Gonzales, scheduling his execution to take place on June 26, 2024. Coincidentally, the date itself was the 42nd birthday of the victim Bridget Townsend.

As a final recourse to avoid execution, Gonzales appealed for clemency. Gonzales's attorney's highlighted his tragic childhood and stated that their client was remorseful of his crimes back in 2001 and that he had found God in prison. It was further raised that Gonzales tried reaching out to Townsend's family, writing letters to them and apologizing for what he had done. Similarly, Gonzales made a tearful plea in his clemency video appeal for forgiveness from the victim's family. Unanimously, the seven-member panel of the Texas Board of Pardons and Paroles rejected the clemency plea of Gonzales on June 24, 2024, and additionally rejected granting him a six-month reprieve.

On June 26, 2024, 41-year-old Ramiro Felix Gonzales was executed via lethal injection at the Huntsville Unit. Gonzales was pronounced dead at 6:50 p.m. after he was administered a single dose of pentobarbital. In his final words, Gonzales apologized for killing Townsend and expressed hope for the family of Townsend to heal and find closure. Gonzales's execution was carried out less than two hours after the U.S. Supreme Court rejected his last-minute appeal, in which Gonzales's lawyers reiterated that based on a trial medical expert's re-assessment that Gonzales was no longer a menace to society, which would have precluded him from the death penalty.

In response to the execution of Gonzales, Townsend's brother David told the press that they had finally witnessed justice being served and that the execution of his sister's murderer marked the "end of a long and painful journey." He had long criticized the sympathetic portrayal of Gonzales as a changed man, as he believed the death penalty should be carried out on account that Gonzales had done an unforgivable act of raping and murdering his sister. Prior to the execution, Townsend's mother Patricia told the press that the state's decision to execute Gonzales on the date of her daughter's 42nd birthday (news outlets erroneously stated it was Townsend's 41st birthday) was a comforting gesture as Gonzales "was set to leave the world the same day Bridget came into it." She refused to accept Gonzales's apology, saying there were many people with difficult childhoods, and that he made the heinous choice of murder and did not deserve mercy.

Gonzales's lawyers, Thea Posel and Raoul Schonemann, released a statement saying that their client was no longer the same person who perpetrated Townsend's murder 23 years prior, but someone who was "a deeply spiritual, generous, patient, and intentional" person filled with remorse for his actions.

Gonzales was the second condemned person from Texas, and also the 8th person to be executed in the U.S. in 2024.

== See also ==
- List of kidnappings (2000–2009)
- List of people executed in Texas, 2020–present
- List of people executed in the United States in 2024
- List of solved missing person cases (2000s)

Executions carried out in Texas
Preceded by Ivan Cantu February 28, 2024	Ramiro Felix Gonzales; June 26, 2024	Succeeded by Arthur Lee Burton August 7, 2024
Executions carried out in the United States
Preceded by David Hosier – Missouri June 11, 2024	Ramiro Felix Gonzales – Texas; June 26, 2024	Succeeded by Richard Norman Rojem Jr. – Oklahoma June 27, 2024
