= Murder of Alijah Mullis =

2008 child murder in Texas

- Alijah Mullis prior his death.
- Location: Galveston County, Texas, U.S.
- Date: January 29, 2008
- Attack type: Murder and child sexual abuse
- Convictions: Capital murder
- Sentence: Death
- Convicted: Travis James Mullis

On January 29, 2008, in Galveston County, Texas, United States, three-month-old Alijah James Mullis (born October 29, 2007) was found dead along the roadside on Seawall Boulevard. Investigations connected the victim's father, Travis James ("TJ") Mullis (September 20, 1986 – September 24, 2024), as a suspect in the murder; he later surrendered and confessed to the crime.

According to Mullis's confession, he sexually assaulted Alijah before he strangled the infant and stomped on his head several times, which led to Alijah's death. The murder of Alijah Mullis was described by the Houston Chronicle as one of the most shocking crimes in Texas during that year.

Mullis was found guilty of murdering the child and sentenced to death in 2011. After waiving his appeals, Mullis was executed on September 24, 2024.

== Murder and investigation ==
On January 29, 2008, Travis James Mullis, then 21 years old, reportedly drove his car with his three-month-old son Alijah in the back seat after he argued with his girlfriend, Caren Kohberger. After he parked his car in Galveston, Mullis sexually assaulted his son. When Alijah cried, Mullis strangled the infant, followed by stomping on his head several times, crushing his skull and leading to his death.

After he killed Alijah, Mullis disposed of the body near Seawall Boulevard. Alijah's body was found by a married couple, Jesse and Esmeralda Zaro, who were searching for wildlife when they made the discovery.

Meanwhile, Mullis fled Texas and went on the run for three days, and a warrant of arrest was issued for him. On February 1, 2008, Mullis surrendered himself to the police in Philadelphia, where he confessed to the murder. Mullis was extradited back to Texas, where he was charged with the murder of his son. Mullis's girlfriend was arrested in New York in February 2008 and charged with child endangerment for entrusting Alijah to the care of Mullis despite her knowledge of Mullis's psychiatric condition and the risk that Mullis might hurt her child.

== Perpetrator ==
Travis James Mullis
- Born: September 20, 1986; Charlotte, North Carolina, U.S.
- Died: September 24, 2024 (aged 38); Huntsville, Texas, U.S.
- Cause of death: Executed by lethal injection
- Conviction: Capital murder
- Penalty: Death

Details
- Victims: 1
- Date: January 29, 2008
- Country: United States
- Locations: Galveston County, Texas

Travis James Mullis was born on September 20, 1986. Mullis was orphaned at about ten months old when his mother died, his father having abandoned the family shortly after his birth. Mullis was adopted by his uncle and aunt, Gary and Anne Mullis, who became his foster parents, and he grew up in Abingdon, Maryland. Gary Mullis sexually abused the boy for three years, until he was six; he was eventually convicted and incarcerated for these crimes.

After the age of four, Mullis often received treatment for psychological problems, including suicidal and homicidal behavior. Mullis reportedly heard voices and got flashbacks of his childhood sexual abuse whenever he molested others. When he was 13, Mullis was caught for molesting his eight-year-old cousin and he was sent to the Jefferson School in Maryland, a school for emotionally troubled juveniles. Mullis spent four years at the juvenile school before he was released at age 17. Mullis moved to Texas when he was 18, and he later lived with his girlfriend, with whom he had a son, Alijah James Mullis, who was born on October 29, 2007.

Before his arrest for murder in 2008, Mullis had a history of molesting young children.

== Trial and sentencing ==
Travis Mullis stood trial before a Galveston County jury on March 7, 2011, for the murder of Alijah Mullis. During the trial itself, the videotape confession of Mullis was played; during his questioning by police, Mullis confessed to killing Alijah due to his incessant cries, stating that it was the only way to stop his son's crying. He also told police that he was remorseful for the death of Alijah. Detective Robert Hesser, who interviewed Mullis before his extradition from Philadelphia to Texas, stated that Mullis admitted to harming Alijah during the interrogation.

On March 11, 2011, the jury took one hour to reach their verdict, finding Mullis guilty of murdering his son. Upon conviction, Mullis faced either the death penalty or life in prison without the possibility of parole.

During the sentencing trial of Mullis, several children who had been molested by Mullis were summoned as witnesses. In addition, Mullis came into contact with his biological family members nearly 23 years after being separated from them. The defense asked for Mullis to be shown leniency on humanitarian grounds due to his troubled childhood and pushed for life without parole, but the prosecution requested the death penalty due to the aggravating factors behind the crime. At that point, Alijah's grandmother Carolyn Entriken told the court that her grandson was "extraordinarily beautiful" and stated how precious he was to her; Entriken died in 2022.

On March 21, 2011, the 12 jurors unanimously agreed to impose the death penalty.

== Appeal process ==
After his sentencing, Mullis stated several times that he wanted to be executed, although he later appealed his sentence. On April 25, 2012, the Texas Court of Criminal Appeals granted Mullis's request to waive his right to appeal; this was the first time he expressed his intention to not appeal.

Mullis changed his mind in July 2013 and appealed to the federal courts, after the Texas statute of limitations on state appeals had expired. In the federal appeals, Mullis's lawyers argued that his sentencing was unconstitutional due to ineffective trial counsel and asked that the death sentence be overturned as it breached his constitutional rights. The federal courts rejected these arguments and upheld the death penalty.

In July 2018, Mullis again asked to fast-track his execution and forgo his remaining rights to appeal. In 2021, U.S. District Judge George Hanks found that Mullis was mentally competent to waive his remaining rights to appeal, and approved his motion to waive his appeals.

In June 2023, Shawn Nolan, Mullis's lawyer, told the 5th U.S. Circuit Court of Appeals that his client had not been mentally competent to forgo his appeals, but the 5th U.S. Circuit Court of Appeals upheld Hanks's verdict and approved Mullis's decision to not appeal further.

== Execution ==
I want to thank the field ministers, the Warden, and the correctional staff for all the changes being made across the system. Even the men on Death Row, to show it is possible to be rehabilitated, and not deemed a threat and not the men we were when we came into the system. We have changed. We are not the same

— Travis Mullis, final statement

On May 23, 2024, Mullis's death warrant was issued, and his execution was scheduled for September 24, 2024, four days after his 38th birthday.

Mullis was one of the five inmates across five U.S. states who were executed between September 20 and September 26, 2024. The other four inmates were Freddie Eugene Owens, who murdered a convenience store clerk in South Carolina in 1997; Marcellus Williams, convicted of fatally stabbing a former reporter in Missouri in 1998; Alan Eugene Miller, convicted of the murder of three people in a 1999 spree shooting in Alabama; and Emmanuel Littlejohn, convicted of the robbery and killing of a convenience store owner in Oklahoma in 1992. One of these five inmates, Marcellus Williams, proclaimed his innocence but was executed on the same date as Mullis.

During the months leading up to his tentative execution date, Mullis did not appeal to stay his execution or file for clemency to the Texas Board of Pardons and Paroles. He additionally stated, "It was my decision that put me here."

On September 24, 2024, Mullis was executed by lethal injection at the Huntsville Unit. In his last words, he thanked prison officials and staff for "changes made across the system" that allowed rehabilitation to be possible for even the condemned, and he apologized to his son's mother and her family, stating he regretted causing the death of Alijah. He said he welcomed death and did not regret giving up his appeals against the death penalty. Mullis was pronounced dead at 7:01 pm after a single dose of pentobarbital was administered to him. Mullis was the fourth inmate put to death in 2024 in Texas.

Shawn Nolan, Mullis's defense attorney, wrote in a statement that his client had "always accepted responsibility" for the awful crime he committed and that "Texas will kill a redeemed man tonight. He never had a chance at life, being abandoned by his parents and then severely abused by his adoptive father starting at age 3. During his decade and a half on death row he spent countless hours working on his redemption. And he achieved it."

Jack Roady, Galveston County criminal district attorney, stated that Mullis's execution marked the "long-awaited fulfillment of a verdict rendered by a jury who heard all of the evidence." Kayla Allen, first assistant district attorney, noted that the jury's verdict had been "affirmed by 13 years of post-conviction review by higher courts ... Some acts are such egregious violations of not only the law, but of civilized standards, that society's only appropriate response is to impose the ultimate penalty on the wrongdoer," she said, noting that Alijah would have celebrated his 17th birthday the following month.

== See also ==
- Capital punishment in Texas
- List of people executed in Texas, 2020–present
- List of people executed in the United States in 2024

Executions carried out in Texas
Preceded by Arthur Lee Burton August 7, 2024	Travis James Mullis; September 24, 2024	Succeeded by Garcia Glen White October 1, 2024
Executions carried out in the United States
Preceded by Marcellus Scott Williams – Missouri September 24, 2024	Travis James Mullis – Texas; September 24, 2024	Succeeded by Emmanuel Antonia Littlejohn – Oklahoma September 26, 2024
