= Steven Lawayne Nelson =

American convicted murderer executed in Texas (1987–2025)

- 2012 mugshot
- Born: February 18, 1987; Ada, Oklahoma, U.S.
- Died: February 5, 2025 (aged 37); Huntsville Unit, Texas, U.S.
- Status: Executed by lethal injection
- Motive: Robbery
- Convictions: Capital murder Theft; Burglary of a Building
- Penalty: Death

Details
- Victims: 1–2
- Date: March 3, 2011
- Location: Arlington, Texas
- Imprisoned at: Allan B. Polunsky Unit

Steven Lawayne Nelson (February 18, 1987 – February 5, 2025) was an American convicted murderer, executed for the 2011 murder of 28-year-old Arlington pastor Clinton "Clint" Dobson in Texas. Nelson was found guilty of the murder of Dobson, who was smothered to death during a robbery bid at an Arlington church on March 3, 2011, and sentenced to death on October 16, 2012.

Nelson protested his innocence and claimed that he only acted as a lookout while pinpointing two of his friends as the real murderers of Dobson, saying that the alibi of both his friends was not sufficiently rebutted by his trial counsel. None of Nelson's DNA was found on the victim. Nelson's grounds of appeal were rejected, and his conviction and sentence were consequently upheld. After exhausting his appeals, Nelson was executed on February 5, 2025, 13 days before his 38th birthday.

He is the second youngest person to be executed in the United States in 2025 proceeding Blaine Milam who was executed at 35.

== Background ==
Steven Lawayne Nelson was born in Ada, Oklahoma, on February 18, 1987. Nelson had a brother and sister (who was deaf) and was a victim of childhood abuse and neglect. Nelson's mother left him at home by himself, sometimes for 3 to 4 days, and never paid much attention to her children, while Nelson's father was often absent in his life, and he was abusive towards his children and wife. Nelson studied up to the 11th grade in school.

At the age of three, Nelson went to set fire to his mother's bed, which was in the living room. Nelson had several run-ins with Oklahoma's juvenile authorities at the age of six, committing property crimes, burglaries, thefts, and aggravated assault. Despite attempts by officials to intervene through counseling and probation, he was incarcerated in a high-risk juvenile detention center at a young age due to his continued involvement in felonies.

Nelson and his family moved to Texas and settled down in Tarrant County. However, Nelson continued to commit crimes and was tried in the Texas juvenile courts. When Nelson was 14, he was arrested for unauthorized use of a motor vehicle, burglary, and criminal trespassing and sentenced to serve an indeterminate term in a juvenile prison by the Tarrant County juvenile court, a rare case for property crimes at his age. Originally sentenced to nine months at the Texas Youth Commission (TYC), Nelson spent over three and a half years there due to continued infractions, including four high-level disciplinary hearings. By the age of 20, Nelson had been released on parole twice while under the radar of the juvenile system but often violated his parole terms when he was free.

In 2005, at 18 years old, Nelson was arrested for driving a stolen car. Two years later, in November 2007, Nelson stole a laptop from a Walmart by hiding it in his pants while pretending to be a store associate. The following week, he was caught again at a different Walmart in Arlington for stealing boots by wearing them out of the store without paying.

After he was released from state jail in 2010, Nelson assaulted his then-live-in girlfriend, and was indicted for aggravated assault with a deadly weapon after the victim filed a complaint against him. Three days later, his girlfriend filed a non-prosecution affidavit to drop the charges, but the DA denied it because of his extensive record. He was subsequently placed on probation and sent to a ninety-day program at the Intermediate Sanctions Facility (ISF).

== Murder of Clint Dobson ==
On March 3, 2011, 24-year-old Steven Nelson murdered a pastor in a church at Arlington, Texas.

Nelson, who was still on probation for the assault of his then-girlfriend, barged into the NorthPointe Baptist Church, where two members of the church were present at the time of the crime. One of them was 28-year-old Clinton "Clint" Dobson, a church pastor, and 69-year-old Judy Elliott, a secretary working at the church. To commit robbery, Nelson attacked both Dobson and Elliott.

Dobson was assaulted before a computer extension cord was used to strangle him, and he was subsequently smothered with a plastic bag. As for Elliott, she was severely beaten, causing her to suffer internal bleeding in her brain and traumatic injuries to her face, head, arms, legs, and back. After leaving the two for dead, Nelson stole Dobson's laptop, a cellphone, Elliott's credit cards, and Elliott's car. Nelson later used the credit cards to purchase new clothes and jewelry, and also sold the laptop for money.

Meanwhile, unable to reach her husband by phone, Clint Dobson's wife contacted Jake Turner, the church's part-time music minister. Turner agreed to go to the church and called Judy Elliott's husband, John, who quickly drove to the location. Upon his arrival, John used his passcode to enter the church, and upon entry, John noticed Dobson's office in disarray and saw a woman, whom he didn't initially recognize as his wife, severely beaten and lying on the floor. However, John did not see Dobson lying on the other side of the desk. John immediately called the police, and Arlington police officer Jesse Parrish discovered Dobson's body. Dobson was pronounced dead at the scene while Elliott was rushed to the hospital. Despite the grim forecast by doctors and a heart attack during her hospitalization, Elliott survived her injuries. She was released from the hospital two weeks later and underwent five months of therapy and rehabilitation. A permanent combination of mesh, screws, and other metal components was used to support Elliott's face. Defense attorneys alleged that Elliott told a doctor that two men had assaulted her.

An autopsy was later conducted by Dr. Nizam Peerwani, a medical examiner for Tarrant County, and results showed that Dobson's injuries were likely caused by a violent struggle, during which he tried to protect himself from blows possibly delivered by the butt of a firearm. Two of the wounds on his forehead appeared to have been caused by the computer monitor stand in the office. Dr. Peerwani stated that the injuries indicated Dobson was likely standing when he was first hit in the head and was struck in the back of his head as he fell. Dr. Peerwani certified that the cause of death was strangulation, caused by the plastic bag covering Dobson's face, which suffocated him.

A memorial service was held at the church in remembrance of Dobson. More than 200 mourners were present at the service, and many remembered Dobson's kindness to the community.

== Arrest ==
Police investigations, which classified the cause of Dobson's death as murder, eventually linked Nelson to the murder. Nelson, who was supposed to report to his probation officer on the date of the murder but failed to do so, was apprehended by police after a warrant of arrest was issued in his case. The police uncovered the belongings of both Elliott and Dobson in Nelson's possession. There were bloodstains found on the shoes of Nelson, and forensic tests confirmed that the DNA of the bloodstains belonged to both Dobson and Elliott. Similarly, the fingerprints extracted from the scene of crime matched to those of Nelson.

After his arrest, Nelson was charged with capital murder. This offense carries either life without parole or the death penalty under Texas state law. A second man, 19-year-old Anthony Gregory Springs, was also arrested and charged, but Springs was later released after the prosecution dropped the murder charge against him.

== Murder of Jonathan Holden ==
After his indictment, Steven Nelson was remanded in a Tarrant County jail while awaiting trial for the murder of Clint Dobson. During his remand, Nelson had repeatedly exhibited violent and disruptive behavior and flouted the rules. He committed several serious infractions, such as breaking a telephone in the visitation booth, damaging prison property, and threatening an officer. He also got into physical altercations with corrections officers regularly (including one such incident where three guards had to restrain Nelson to stop him).

However, the most serious incident occurred on March 19, 2012, when Nelson allegedly murdered a mentally ill prisoner. According to sources, the prisoner in question, Jonathan Holden, who was incarcerated for theft, had allegedly muttered a derogatory racial term that was directed toward African Americans, and it angered some of the prisoners. Although Holden was not sharing a cell with Nelson as they were housed individually, Nelson, who was African American, was probably similarly angered.

Nelson lured Holden to the bars of his cell and brandished a noose, which he fashioned out of blankets. Nelson reportedly told Holden to hang himself in a fake suicide attempt to earn himself a transfer to another part of the prison. Holden complied by moving to the cell bars, and after looping the noose around Holden's neck, Nelson tightened the blanket by placing his feet against the bars, pulling on the blanket with both hands and pulling Holden against the wall and almost off his feet. Holden died four minutes later, and according to his other cellmates, Nelson allegedly did a "celebration dance" and even used a broom as a guitar after murdering Holden.

When the circumstances of Holden's murder were discovered, Nelson was transferred to another cell in the same hallway as they were already in solitary confinement and segregated from the rest of the prison's general population. Nelson continued to exhibit misbehaviors despite being isolated from the other inmates.

In 2014, two years after Holden was killed, Holden's family filed a civil rights lawsuit against Tarrant County over his death. The family eventually settled, and Tarrant County agreed to pay $350,000.

== Capital murder trial ==
On October 1, 2012, Steven Nelson officially stood trial for the murder of Clint Dobson. Nelson was indicted on one count of capital murder and another count of attempted capital murder by a Tarrant County jury. The prosecution expressed their intent to pursue the death penalty for Nelson.

During the trial, the prosecution argued that Nelson was the lone killer in the case of Dobson's death. They argued that the forensic evidence had effectively placed Nelson at the crime scene. They cited the evidence of his having stolen the belongings of the victims, selling Dobson's laptop, and using the victims' credit cards for shopping. The evidence against Nelson was mostly circumstantial, but the prosecution urged the jury to convict Nelson based on the circumstantial evidence that strongly incriminated him as the perpetrator of the murder. They described Nelson as a "predator" who committed a terrible crime for the victim's valuables.

In his defense, Nelson testified that he was not the only one involved in the murder and pinpointed his two friends, Anthony Springs and Claude Jefferson, as the ones who murdered Dobson. Nelson claimed that he, Springs, and Jefferson entered the church together, and he stole Dobson's laptop, Elliott's keys, and Elliott's credit cards before leaving. He added that both Jefferson and Springs were together with the victims, assaulting them while he was outside acting as a lookout. He claimed that he was only guilty of robbing the victim but denied killing Dobson or beating Elliott. However, both Jefferson and Springs had alibis at the time of the murder. Jefferson said he was at his university attending a chemistry test (which was never confirmed as Nelson's lawyer questioned the professor and they stated there was no chemistry test that day). At the same time, Springs' phone was over 30 miles away at the time of the murder. Nelson explained the presence of the victim's DNA on his shoe or the discovery of his broken belt pieces by stating he crawled under a table to grab a laptop bag at the murder site.

On October 8, 2012, the jury found Nelson guilty of both capital murder and attempted capital murder. A sentencing trial commenced thereafter to decide whether Nelson should face the death penalty or life in prison without the possibility of parole.

During the final submissions, the prosecution sought the death penalty for Nelson, stating that Nelson had a long criminal history since his childhood and also brought up evidence of his multiple incidents of rule-breaking and prison violence, including the killing of Jonathan Holden. They argued that Nelson was a lingering menace to society based on his lack of compliance with prison regulations and rehabilitative efforts, and multiple crimes before the murder of Dobson, and he deserved the ultimate penalty for his alleged heinous conduct of taking Dobson's life and assaulting Elliott.

The defense, however, argued for a life sentence. They brought forward Nelson's troubled childhood and learning difficulties, among other mitigating factors, in favor of life imprisonment for their client. A forensic psychiatrist testified that Nelson had both attention deficit hyperactivity disorder and antisocial personality disorder.

In their victim impact statements, Dobson's family and friends spoke of Dobson's good deeds during his lifetime as a pastor. Dobson's widow stated that her husband would be remembered fondly for his kindness and sense of humor. She condemned Nelson for his atrocities, stating that no one would remember him for destroying the lives of his victims. Dobson's father-in-law said in his victim impact statement he would never understand the terrible things Nelson did for a laptop and credit cards, similarly reprimanding Nelson for his crimes.

On October 16, 2012, 25-year-old Steven Lawayne Nelson was sentenced to death by Judge Mike Thomas after all 12 jurors unanimously agreed to impose the death penalty. Reportedly, after his sentencing, Nelson flooded the courtroom with black fire-retardant liquid by breaking a fire sprinkler, in retaliation towards the judge and Jury for sentencing him to death. Even after the end of his trial, Nelson continued to maintain his innocence in an interview with the Associated Press, and acknowledged he had anger problems but denied he was a murderer.

== Appeals ==
After he was sentenced to death, Nelson was transferred to the Allan B. Polunsky Unit, where he was incarcerated on death row for the next decade. During this period, Nelson appealed against his death sentence.

On April 15, 2015, Nelson's direct appeal was dismissed by the Texas Court of Criminal Appeals.

On March 29, 2017, District Judge John H. McBryde of the U.S. District Court for the Northern District of Texas rejected Nelson's appeal.

On March 12, 2020, the 5th Circuit Court of Appeals upheld McBryde's ruling and turned down Nelson's appeal.

On June 30, 2023, the 5th Circuit Court of Appeals again rejected a second appeal from Nelson.

== Execution ==
=== Death warrant ===
After spending close to 12 years on death row, Nelson received his death warrant and the execution order, which Judge Steven Jumes signed on June 10, 2024. The sentence was scheduled to be carried out on February 5, 2025. Nelson was set to be the first condemned inmate from Texas to be executed in the state in 2025.

On November 15, 2024, a protest rally was held by a group of death penalty opponents to protest against Nelson's impending execution. A December 2024 report revealed that Nelson was one of the four condemned inmates from Texas to have their execution dates scheduled between February and April 2025.

The response of many Christians to the impending execution of Nelson was divided. Some of the religious figures, including anti-death penalty activist Jeff Hood, argued that the teachings of the Bible demonstrated that the death penalty was not justified for Nelson and his life should be spared out of mercy. However, some others, including members of Clint Dobson's church, supported the execution of Nelson, and First Baptist Arlington pastor Dennis Wiles, who was affiliated to the same church as Dobson, had previously affirmed his support to execute Nelson in a 2012 statement, "As the Bible teaches us, God has placed the civil authority in our midst so that innocent people can live in freedom without fear and so that guilty offenders can be appropriately punished."

On January 28, 2025, the Texas Court of Criminal Appeals rejected Nelson's last-minute appeal to stave off his execution.

In an interview dated February 3, 2025, Nelson continued to insist that he was innocent.

A final appeal was lodged to the U.S. Supreme Court, but it was ultimately rejected on the afternoon of February 5, 2025, hours before the tentative timing of Nelson's execution.

=== Lethal injection ===
On February 5, 2025, 37-year-old Steven Lawayne Nelson was put to death by lethal injection in the Huntsville Unit. Nelson was pronounced dead at 6.50 p.m. that evening, after the drugs were administered to him.

In response to the execution of Nelson, Dobson's family released a statement in remembrance of the late pastor, "Clint (Dobson) loved people, and he loved God. He was always excited by the opportunity to unite the two. A believer in social justice, he led a diverse congregation and worked to make sure that everyone felt comfortable and welcome at NorthPointe."

Nelson's final words were directed towards his wife, saying: "I will always love you no matter ... our love is uncontrollable. I'm at peace, I'm ready to be at home. Let's ride, Warden."

=== Response ===
After the execution was carried out, there were divided reactions from the public, particularly from the Christians residing in the U.S. Some protested against capital punishment and argued that the system was riddled with flaws, one of whom described it as an "archaic, unethical system", with the United Methodist Church, the Episcopalian Church and Roman Catholic Church opposing capital punishment. However, a majority of the Christians remained in favor of capital punishment, with the support coming from mostly the evangelicals and mainline Protestants, including Southern Baptists. Despite the opposition from the Catholic Church, a majority of Catholics supported the death penalty based on a 2021 poll result.

In response to the backlash against Dobson's church for not speaking up against Nelson's case, First Baptist Arlington Senior Pastor Dennis Wiles released a statement, saying that he did not wish to comment on his opinion on the capital punishment but rather to focus on his responsibility to take care of the families affected by the case, and abstain from publicly joining in the religious debate surrounding capital punishment. Judy Elliott, who survived the murder, died in 2024, and her son reportedly attended the execution on behalf of his late mother. The Elliott family stated they already forgiven Nelson despite stopping short of commenting whether they support or oppose his death sentence.

== See also ==
- List of people executed in Texas, 2020–present
- List of people executed in the United States in 2025

Executions carried out in Texas
Preceded by Garcia Glen White October 1, 2024	Steven Lawayne Nelson; February 5, 2025	Succeeded by Richard Lee Tabler February 13, 2025
Executions carried out in the United States
Preceded by Marion Bowman Jr. – South Carolina January 31, 2025	Steven Lawayne Nelson – Texas; February 5, 2025	Succeeded by Demetrius Terrence Frazier – Alabama February 6, 2025
