= Taberon Honie =

Native American convicted murderer (1975–2024)

- Taberon Honie prior his execution.
- Born: Taberon Dave Honie; October 29, 1975; Keams Canyon, Arizona, U.S.
- Died: August 8, 2024 (aged 48); Utah State Correctional Facility, Salt Lake City, Utah, U.S.
- Cause of death: Execution by lethal injection
- Citizenship: Hopi Tribe • American
- Children: 1
- Conviction: Aggravated murder
- Penalty: Death (May 20, 1999)

Details
- Victims: Claudia Marie Benn, 49
- Date: July 9–10, 1998
- Country: United States
- State: Utah
- Weapon: Kitchen knife

Taberon Dave Honie (October 29, 1975 – August 8, 2024) was an American murderer and rapist who was executed by the U.S. state of Utah for murdering and raping his ex-girlfriend's mother, Claudia Benn, in 1998. He was the first person to be executed in Utah in over fourteen years, since Ronnie Lee Gardner in June 2010.

== Early life ==
Taberon Honie was born on October 29, 1975. He was a Native American from the Hopi tribe. He described first having had alcohol when he was five years old, and in a later appeal, his attorneys stated he grew up in poverty and suffered multiple head injuries as a child.

== Murder ==
=== Background ===
The murder victim, 49-year-old Claudia Marie Benn, was a member of the Paiute Indian Tribe of Utah. Her family members described her as a pillar of her community. She worked as a substance abuse counselor and a caregiver to her family. One of her daughters was Carol Pikyavit, whom Honie had dated from approximately 1995 to 1998; Honie and Pikyavit had a daughter together. After breaking up with Honie, Pikyavit moved in with her mother.

=== Killing ===
On the evening of July 9, 1998, Honie called Pikyavit, demanding that she visit him immediately; he threatened to kill several of her family members if she did not comply. Pikyavit left her house to go to work and was not home at the time of the murder. Hours later, Honie broke into the house Pikyavit shared with her mother, Claudia Marie Benn, in Cedar City, Utah, by shattering a sliding glass door. Benn attempted to defend herself with a kitchen knife. Still, Honie overpowered her and attacked her with the knife, slashing her throat four times from ear to ear, with the slashes being deep enough to reach her backbone. In the early hours of the next day, police officers came to Benn's house, responding to a 911 call from one of her neighbors. The responding officers found a smashed window and Benn's partially naked and mutilated corpse, with deep stab wounds to her anus and vagina. They found Honie in Benn's garage, arresting him after he was found with blood residue on his fingertips. During Honie's arrest, he stated, "I stabbed her. I killed her with a knife." The responding officers located Benn's three young granddaughters in the same house, covered in blood. Honie had sexually abused one of Benn's granddaughters immediately following Benn's murder, causing genital injuries.

== Legal proceedings ==
After his arrest, Honie was charged with aggravated murder. He waived his right to a jury sentencing during his trial and opted for a bench trial. On May 20, 1999, he was sentenced to death by lethal injection after an Iron County court convicted him of aggravated murder, burglary, object rape, and forcible sodomy.

On January 11, 2002, Honie lost his first round of appeals after failed attempts to challenge the constitutionality of the death penalty in Utah and claims of racially motivated prosecutors. In 2013, Honie filed another appeal, claiming that his attorneys did an inadequate job at defending him and reviewing his background. He also claimed that he suffered from fetal alcohol syndrome and that he suffered from brain damage due to a 30-foot fall that he experienced as a teenager. In 2014, Honie's appeal was denied by the Utah Supreme Court.

== Execution ==
On May 1, 2024, a request for Honie's execution warrant was filed by the Utah Attorney General. On May 24, 2024, a lawsuit challenging Utah's execution methods of lethal injection and death by firing squad was denied by a judge, allowing for Honie's execution warrant to be signed. On June 10, 2024, his execution by lethal injection was scheduled to take place on August 8, 2024, with a new lethal injection cocktail consisting of fentanyl, ketamine, and potassium chloride. Honie filed an appeal challenging the use of the new cocktail as experimental and prone to causing severe and unnecessary pain, instead suggesting the use of a single dose of pentobarbital, which had been used in multiple executions before Honie's. On July 7, 2024, Utah officials decided to use pentobarbital in Honie's execution instead of the new three-drug cocktail. Utah officials ordered three doses of pentobarbital for a total of $200,000 USD, although they only intended to use one five-gram dose in Honie's execution unless there were complications necessitating the use of any of the additional doses.

On June 18, 2024, Honie filed a petition for clemency, mentioning his childhood poverty and neglect. On June 24, 2024, it was reported that Honie's attorney filed several petitioning motions to halt his execution.

Two days before Honie was executed, Honie had a hearing before Utah's parole board to request a reprieve. At the hearing, Honie expressed remorse for Benn's murder and stated, "Yes, I'm a monster. The only thing that kept me going all these years, the only thing I know 100%, this would never happen if I was in my right mind... I make no excuses." The parole board rejected Honie's request.

About a dozen of Benn's family members, including Benn's granddaughter who was also Honie's daughter, planned to attend Honie's execution. Honie's mother also attended the execution. Honie's daughter stated that her maternal grandmother's side of the family largely supported Honie's death sentence and execution, while she did not. Honie's last meal was a cheeseburger, french fries and a milkshake.

Honie's execution took place at midnight on August 8, 2024. In his last statement, he stated, "From the start, it's been, if it needs to be done for [the victims' families] to heal, let's do this. If they tell you you can't change, don't listen to them. To all my brothers and sisters here, continue to change. I love you all; take care." After his final statement, he thanked Randall Honey and Bart Mortensen, the director of prison operations and the prison warden respectively, for "taking care of [his] family". A dose of pentobarbital was administered at 12:04 am MT, and officials administered a second dose at 12:13 am. Honie flatlined at 12:21 am, at which point his family members were permitted to enter the execution chamber and perform a "spiritual ceremony" over his body; afterwards, a medical examiner officially pronounced him dead at 12:25 am. Honie's execution was the first execution to take place in Utah since that of Ronnie Lee Gardner, who died by firing squad in 2010 and the first to take place at the Utah State Correctional Facility, which opened in 2022.

== See also ==
- Capital punishment in Utah
- Capital punishment in the United States
- List of most recent executions by jurisdiction
- List of people executed in Utah
- List of people executed in the United States in 2024

Executions carried out in Utah
Preceded by Ronnie Lee Gardner June 18, 2010	Taberon Honie; August 8, 2024	Succeeded by most recent
Executions carried out in the United States
Preceded by Arthur Lee Burton – Texas August 7, 2024	Taberon Honie – Utah; August 8, 2024	Succeeded by Loran Cole – Florida August 29, 2024
