= Execution of Quintin Jones =

American prisoner executed in Texas (1979–2021)

Quintin Phillippe Jones
- Mugshot of Jones taken by the Texas Department of Criminal Justice
- Born: July 15, 1979; Fort Worth, Texas, U.S.
- Died: May 19, 2021 (aged 41); Huntsville Unit, Huntsville, Texas, U.S.
- Cause of death: Execution by lethal injection
- Conviction: Capital murder
- Penalty: Death (March 16, 2001)

Details
- Victims: 3 (two as an accomplice)
- Span of crimes: June – September 11, 1999
- Country: United States
- State: Texas

Quintin Phillippe Jones (July 15, 1979 – May 19, 2021) was an American man from Livingston, Texas, who was executed for the 1999 killing of his great-aunt, Berthena Bryant. Bryant's family and over 120,000 other people petitioned Texas Governor Greg Abbott for clemency to commute his death sentence to a life sentence. He was executed on May 19, 2021, the first execution by the state of Texas in 10 months and only the second since the beginning of the COVID-19 pandemic in March 2020. He was executed without any media presence.

== Biography ==
Jones experienced 'brutal conditions' during his childhood, suffering neglect by his parents, sexual assault by his siblings, and extreme poverty. His mother threatened him with a gun, and when he was seven years old his older siblings forced him to have sex with his stepsister. He shot himself twice, once in the hand to placate gang members and later in the chest in a suicide attempt. He became addicted to drugs by his early teens. Prosecutors who got death penalty conviction for Jones argued that death penalty was justified for Jones because Jones had a violent history, including assaulting teachers.

=== Crimes ===
On September 11, 1999, Jones murdered his great-aunt, 83-year-old Berthena Bryant, bludgeoning her to death with a baseball bat. Afterwards, he stole her money in order to purchase cocaine. He was high on heroin and cocaine during the murder.

Jones also admitted to participating in the murders of Clark Peoples, 27, and Marc Sanders, 19, in June 1999. However, he placed most of the blame for those murders on another man, Riky Roosa. The murders were mentioned by the prosecution in their arguments for a death sentence. Roosa was convicted of two counts of capital murder and sentenced to life in prison. He will become eligible for parole on September 21, 2039.

== Trial ==
Jones admitted to the killing during the trial and showed remorse. The Bryant family gave evidence in the trial of Jones's mental illness and addiction. Jones was sentenced to death and spent 20 years on death row with 23 hours a day in solitary confinement.

Michael Mowla, Jones's attorney, later filed a habeas corpus motion in Texas state court, arguing that prosecutors gave unscientific testimony during the trial, violating Jones's rights. Texas state law only allows the death penalty on the argument of "future dangerousness", and Jones had no record of violence in prison.

The Austin American-Statesman has highlighted racial bias in his sentencing. They have compared Jones's sentence to that of Roosa, who is white and was given a life sentence with the possibility of parole after being convicted of murdering two people. Jones, who is black, was sentenced to death for one murder.

=== Clemency petition ===
Bryant's family, with help from several other people and organizations, petitioned for Texas Governor Greg Abbott to grant clemency to Jones. They began an unsuccessful petition which reached 183,344 signatures. Abbott had given clemency in 2019 to Thomas "Bart" Whitaker for the murder of his mother and brother, after his father Kent Whitaker, who was shot during the attack, pleaded for clemency.

- Mattie Long, sister of murder victim Berthena Bryant, wrote in the clemency petition to Governor Abbott "I have forgiven him, I love him very much... I am writing this to ask you to please spare Quintin's life".
- Writer Suleika Jaouad called for clemency. Jones supported her through treatment for leukemia with a 30% chance of survival in her 20s. She interviewed him for The New York Times.
- Benjamin Jones, Quintin's twin brother stated in the clemency petition "Both of us have long forgiven Quin. Please don't cause us to be victimized again through Quin's execution."
- Jones worked with The New York Times to ask for clemency from Governor Abbott, stating, "I'm writing this letter to ask you if you could find it in your heart to grant me clemency, so I don't get executed on 19 May. I got two weeks to live, starting today."
- On May 10, he was featured in The New York Times essay 'Quintin Jones Is Not Innocent, But He Doesn't Deserve to Die'.

== Execution ==
Jones was executed by lethal injection at 6:40 p.m. CDT on May 19, 2021. While members of the media were scheduled to be present to witness the execution, they were not admitted to the prison by authorities due to a communication error, making it the first execution in nearly 30 years without a media presence.

Before his execution, Jones made this final statement:

I would like to thank all of the supporting people who helped me over the years. To mad Maddie, my twin Sonja, Angie, and all the homies. AKA money and Peruvian queen including crazy Dominican. I was so glad to leave this world a better, more positive place. It's not an easy life with all the negativities. Love all my friends and all the friendships that I have made. They are like the sky. It is all part of life, like a big full plate of food for the soul. I hope I left everyone a plate of food full of happy memories, happiness and no sadness. I'm done, warden.

== See also ==
- List of people executed in Texas, 2020–present
- List of people executed in the United States in 2021

Executions carried out in Texas
Preceded by Billy Joe Wardlow July 8, 2020	Quintin Jones; May 19, 2021	Succeeded by John Hummel June 30, 2021
Executions carried out in the United States
Preceded by Dustin Higgs – Federal government January 16, 2021	Quintin Jones – Texas; May 19, 2021	Succeeded by John Hummel – Texas June 30, 2021
