= List of people executed in Texas, 2020–present =

The following is a list of people executed by the U.S. state of Texas since 2020. To date, 38 people have been executed since 2020. All of the people during this period were convicted of murder and have been executed by lethal injection at the Huntsville Unit in Huntsville, Texas.

== Executions 2020–present ==
The number in the "#" column indicates the nth person executed since 1982 (when Texas resumed the death penalty). As an example, John Steven Gardner (the first person executed in Texas during the 2020 decade) was the 568th person executed since resumption of the death penalty.

2020 – 3 executions
| # | Executed person | Ethnicity | Age | Sex | Date of execution | County | Victim(s) | Governor |
|---|---|---|---|---|---|---|---|---|
| 568 | John Steven Gardner | White | 64 | M | 15-Jan-2020 | Collin | Tammy Gardner | Greg Abbott |
| 569 | Abel Revill Ochoa | Hispanic | 47 | M | 06-Feb-2020 | Dallas | 5 murder victims (Note: The 5 victims were: Cecilia Ochoa, Crystal Ochoa, Anahi Ochoa, Bartolo Alvizo, and Jacqueline Saleh.) | Greg Abbott |
| 570 | Billy Joe Wardlow | White | 45 | M | 08-Jul-2020 | Titus | Carl Cole | Greg Abbott |
| 2021 – 3 executions | | | | | | | | Greg Abbott |
| 571 | Quintin Phillippe Jones | Black | 41 | M | 19-May-2021 | Tarrant | Berthena Bryant | Greg Abbott |
| 572 | John William Hummel | White | 45 | M | 30-Jun-2021 | Tarrant | Joy Keziyah Hummel, Jodi Ruth Hummel, and Clyde Bedford | Greg Abbott |
| 573 | Rick Allan Rhoades | White | 57 | M | 28-Sep-2021 | Harris | Bradley Allen and Charles Allen | Greg Abbott |
| 2022 – 5 executions | | | | | | | | Greg Abbott |
| 574 | Carl Wayne Buntion | White | 78 | M | 21-Apr-2022 | Harris | Houston police officer James Bruce Irby | Greg Abbott |
| 575 | Kosoul Chanthakoummane | Asian | 41 | M | 17-Aug-2022 | Collin | Sarah Anne Walker | Greg Abbott |
| 576 | John Henry Ramirez | Hispanic | 38 | M | 05-Oct-2022 | Nueces | Pablo Castro | Greg Abbott |
| 577 | Tracy Lane Beatty | White | 61 | M | 09-Nov-2022 | Smith | Carolyn Click | Greg Abbott |
| 578 | Stephen Dale Barbee | White | 55 | M | 16-Nov-2022 | Tarrant | Lisa Underwood and Jayden Underwood | Greg Abbott |
| 2023 – 8 executions | | | | | | | | Greg Abbott |
| 579 | Robert Alan Fratta | White | 65 | M | 10-Jan-2023 | Harris | Farah Fratta | Greg Abbott |
| 580 | Wesley Lynn Ruiz | Hispanic | 43 | M | 01-Feb-2023 | Dallas | Dallas police officer Mark Timothy Nix | Greg Abbott |
| 581 | John Lezell Balentine | Black | 54 | M | 08-Feb-2023 | Potter | Mark Edward Caylor, Kai Brooke Geyer, and Steven Brady Watson | Greg Abbott |
| 582 | Gary Green | Black | 51 | M | 07-Mar-2023 | Dallas | Lovetta Armstead and Jazzmen Montgomery | Greg Abbott |
| 583 | Arthur Brown Jr. | Black | 52 | M | 09-Mar-2023 | Harris | 4 murder victims (Note: The 4 victims were: Jose Tovar, Jessica Quiñones, Frank Farias, and Audrey Brown.) | Greg Abbott |
| 584 | Jedidiah Isaac Murphy | White | 48 | M | 10-Oct-2023 | Dallas | Bertie Lee Cunningham | Greg Abbott |
| 585 | Brent Ray Brewer | White | 53 | M | 09-Nov-2023 | Randall | Robert Doyle Laminack | Greg Abbott |
| 586 | David Santiago Renteria | Native American | 53 | M | 16-Nov-2023 | El Paso | Alexandra Flores | Greg Abbott |
| 2024 – 5 executions | | | | | | | | Greg Abbott |
| 587 | Ivan Abner Cantu | Hispanic | 50 | M | 28-Feb-2024 | Collin | James Edwin Mosqueda and Amy Michelle Kitchen | Greg Abbott |
| 588 | Ramiro Felix Gonzales | Hispanic | 41 | M | 26-Jun-2024 | Medina | Bridget Fay Townsend | Greg Abbott |
| 589 | Arthur Lee Burton | Black | 54 | M | 07-Aug-2024 | Harris | Nancy Jean Adleman | Greg Abbott |
| 590 | Travis James Mullis | White | 38 | M | 24-Sep-2024 | Galveston | Alijah James Mullis | Greg Abbott |
| 591 | Garcia Glen White | Black | 61 | M | 01-Oct-2024 | Harris | 5 murder victims (Note: The 5 victims were: Greta Williams, Bonita Edwards, Annette Edwards, Bernette Edwards, and Hai Van Pham.) | Greg Abbott |
| 2025 – 5 executions | | | | | | | | Greg Abbott |
| 592 | Steven Lawayne Nelson | Black | 37 | M | 05-Feb-2025 | Tarrant | Clinton Dobson and Jonathan Holden | Greg Abbott |
| 593 | Richard Lee Tabler | White | 46 | M | 13-Feb-2025 | Bell | 4 murder victims (Note: The 4 victims were: Amanda Benefield, Tiffany Lorraine Dotson, Mohamed-Amine Rahmouni, and Haitham Frank Zayed.) | Greg Abbott |
| 594 | Moises Sandoval Mendoza | Hispanic | 41 | M | 23-Apr-2025 | Collin | Rachelle O'Neil Tolleson | Greg Abbott |
| 595 | Matthew Lee Johnson | Black | 49 | M | 20-May-2025 | Dallas | Nancy Judith Harris | Greg Abbott |
| 596 | Blaine Keith Milam | White | 35 | M | 25-Sep-2025 | Rusk | Amora Bain Carson | Greg Abbott |
| 2026 – 9 executions | | | | | | | | Greg Abbott |
| 597 | Charles Victor Thompson | White | 55 | M | 28-Jan-2026 | Harris | Glenda Dennise Hayslip and Darren Keith Cain | Greg Abbott |
| 598 | Cedric Allen Ricks | Black | 51 | M | 11-Mar-2026 | Tarrant | Roxann Diana Sanchez and Anthony Reyes Figueroa | Greg Abbott |
| 599 | James Garfield Broadnax | Black | 37 | M | 30-Apr-2026 | Dallas | Matthew Butler and Stephen Swan | Greg Abbott |
| 600 | Edward Lee Busby Jr. | Black | 53 | M | 14-May-2026 | Tarrant | Laura Lee Crane | Greg Abbott |
| 601 | LeJames Norman | Black | 40 | M | 16-Sep-2026 | Jackson | Samuel Justin Roberts, Tiffani Marie Peacock, and Celso Lopez | Greg Abbott |
| 602 | Ker'Sean Olajuwa Ramey | Black | 41 | M | 23-Sep-2026 | Jackson | Samuel Justin Roberts, Tiffani Marie Peacock, and Celso Lopez | Greg Abbott |
| 603 | Jamaal Howard | Black | 46 | M | 07-Oct-2026 | Hardin | Vickie Lee Swartout | Greg Abbott |
| 604 | John Allen Rubio | Hispanic | 46 | M | 12-Nov-2026 | Cameron | Julissa Angela Quezada, John Esteban Rubio, and Mary Jane Rubio | Greg Abbott |
| 605 | Reinaldo Dennes | Hispanic | 70 | M | 19-Nov-2026 | Harris | Janos Szucs | Greg Abbott |
Source: List of executed offenders by the TDCJ since 1982.

| Preceded by List of people executed in Texas, 2010–2019 | Lists of people executed in Texas | Succeeded by Current list |
