= Glen Edward Rogers =

Executed American convicted serial killer (1962–2025)

Glen Rogers
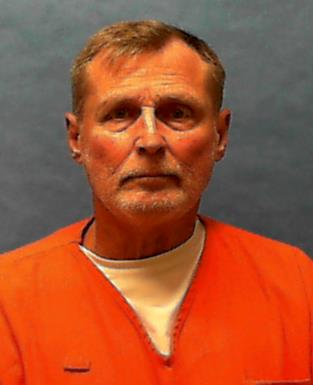
- Mug shot of Rogers
- Born: July 15, 1962; Hamilton, Ohio, U.S.
- Died: May 15, 2025 (aged 62); Florida State Prison, Raiford, Florida, U.S.
- Other names: The Cross Country Killer; The Casanova Killer
- Height: 6 ft (1.83 m)
- Status: Executed by lethal injection
- Convictions: Florida; First degree murder Armed robbery Grand theft auto California; First degree murder with special circumstances Arson
- Penalty: Florida; Death; California; Death

Details
- Victims: 2 convictions, 3+ more suspected, 70 claimed
- Span of crimes: 1993–1995
- Country: United States
- States: California; Florida; Ohio; Mississippi; Louisiana
- Date apprehended: November 13, 1995

Glen Edward Rogers (July 15, 1962 – May 15, 2025) was an American convicted serial killer. He was also convicted of related crimes in Florida and California, such as armed robbery, grand theft auto, and arson.

Also known as "The Cross Country Killer" or "The Casanova Killer", he was convicted of first degree murder at two separate trials in the deaths of two women (the first in Florida in 1997 and the second in California in June 1999). He is a suspect in numerous other murders throughout the United States. His crime spree began on September 28, 1995.

He was sentenced to death in both Florida and California for his crimes. He was incarcerated for almost 30 years on death row at Union Correctional Institution in Raiford, Florida, and he was executed on May 15, 2025, at the Florida State Prison.

== Early life ==
Rogers was born and raised in Hamilton, Ohio. He was one of seven children born to Edna (née Sears) and Claude Rogers. Among his siblings is a brother Clay. Their father Claude was a hydro pulp operator at the local Champion paper company. Rogers was expelled from his junior high school before he was 16.

Sometime after his expulsion, he got his 14-year-old girlfriend Deborah Ann Nix pregnant. The young couple married. They had another child together in 1981. In 1983, Nix filed for divorce, alleging physical abuse by Rogers.

== Murders ==
Authorities in Hamilton, Ohio suspected Rogers of fatally stabbing or strangling an elderly man in that city in 1993. Later Rogers moved away from Ohio, surfacing in California. Subsequently, in 1995, he was named as a suspect in the murders of four women that year: in California, Mississippi, Florida, and Louisiana, respectively.

After being arrested in Kentucky following a vehicle pursuit on November 13, 1995, Rogers originally told police that he had committed nearly 70 murders. He recanted his statement, claiming he was only joking and had not actually committed any murders.

=== Mark Peters (Hamilton, Ohio) ===
On January 10, 1994, police recovered the remains of 71-year-old Mark Peters, a retired electrician and veteran, in a cabin belonging to the family of Glen Rogers in Beattyville, Kentucky. Before October 1993 Peters had taken Glen Rogers in and allowed him to share his home in Hamilton. That month Peters was reported missing, along with his car and several valuable personal items, including antiques, guns, and a collection of coins. Rogers had disappeared.

His brother Clay reportedly led police to search the family cabin for clues. Peters's remains were found there, bound to a chair and hidden by a pile of furniture.

=== Sandra Gallagher (Los Angeles, California) ===
On September 28, 1995, Sandra Gallagher, a 33-year-old mother of three, was observed encountering Rogers at McRed's bar in Van Nuys, California. The next day, Gallagher's badly burned corpse was found in her truck parked near Rogers's Van Nuys apartment. She was found to have been strangled. Authorities allege that after murdering Gallagher, Rogers fled to the Southeast, living for a time in Mississippi, Florida, and Louisiana. In each state, he was suspected of the murder of another woman.

On June 22, 1999, Rogers was convicted in California of murdering Gallagher. He was already serving time in Florida for the murder of a woman there. On July 16, California sentenced him to death.

=== Linda Price (Jackson, Mississippi) ===
According to Kathy Carroll, her sister Linda Price met Rogers at a beer tent at the Mississippi State Fair in fall 1995. Linda repeatedly said: "Ain't he good-looking?" Rogers and Price briefly shared an apartment in Jackson, Mississippi. Price was a 34 year old single mother with two children, then 15 and 18.

The last time Carroll saw her sister was the night before Halloween 1995. The two planned to have Carroll's grandchildren go trick-or-treating at Price's apartment, but Price did not answer her door on Halloween, and Rogers appeared to have left. Similar to his other suspected female victims, Price was in her 30s and had red hair. She was found dead in a bathtub in her apartment.

=== Tina Marie Cribbs (Tampa, Florida) ===
On November 5, 1995, Cribbs was seen leaving the Showtown Bar in Gibsonton, Florida with Rogers. A bartender told police that Rogers had bought drinks for Cribbs and her friends. Later he asked Cribbs for a ride. Two days later, a member of the cleaning staff at the Tampa 8 Inn discovered Cribbs's body in a bathtub (like that of Price in Mississippi). She had been stabbed in the chest and the buttocks. A clerk at the motel told authorities that Rogers had arrived at the motel a few days before the murder.

On November 5, Rogers had paid for an extra night and asked that his room not be cleaned. The clerk saw Rogers putting his belongings into a white Ford Festiva. The next day, Cribbs's wallet was discovered at a rest area in North Florida. Police found that fingerprints lifted from her wallet and the motel room matched those of Rogers. On November 13, Rogers was arrested in Kentucky while driving Cribbs's car. He claimed that Cribbs had lent it to him and that she was alive when he left Tampa.

On July 11, 1997, Rogers was convicted in Florida and sentenced to death for the murder of Tina Marie Cribbs. He was incarcerated in Union Correctional Institution on death row.

=== Andy Jiles Sutton (Bossier City, Louisiana) ===
Sutton was a known acquaintance of Rogers. Her slashed body was found on November 9, 1995, on a punctured waterbed in her apartment in Bossier City, Louisiana.

== Arrest, sentence, and appeals ==
Rogers drove north from Louisiana and was arrested in Waco, Kentucky, after a 13-mile (20 km) chase on November 13, 1995. Kentucky State Police Detective Bob Stephens noticed a man driving Cribbs's stolen car. He chased him, followed by rookie Irvine, Kentucky police officer Charles Cox. Trooper Ed Robinson and other officers set up a roadblock to stop Rogers. Robinson fired a shotgun blast that hit the rear tires but it didn't stop Rogers. Robinson joined the pursuit. Sgt. Joey Barnes (who formerly served with Florida Highway Patrol) rammed his patrol car into Cribbs's stolen car and spun Rogers off the highway into a ditch. Stephens, Cox, Robinson, Barnes, and other officers surrounded Rogers and arrested him. A local TV news crew filmed Rogers's chase and arrest on the scene.

After being convicted and sentenced to death for Cribbs's murder, Rogers was scheduled to be executed on Valentine's Day 1999 in Florida. He filed various appeals, but these were denied.

=== Appeal ===
After his trial, he appealed his conviction to the Florida Supreme Court, claiming that the State had not presented enough evidence to support the charges. Rogers also argued that the trial court should have granted the defense's motions for a mistrial because a witness was allowed to testify about a misdemeanor for which Rogers was convicted in California. He claimed the prosecution was allowed to present an improper argument during closing arguments. His appeal was delayed until March 2001 and was ultimately denied.

== Execution ==
=== Death warrant ===
On April 15, 2025, Governor of Florida Ron DeSantis signed a death warrant for Rogers, scheduling his execution for May 15, 2025. Rogers was the fifth inmate from Florida to have his execution scheduled in 2025, after James Dennis Ford (February 13, 2025), Edward Thomas James (March 20, 2025), Michael Anthony Tanzi (April 8, 2025), and Jeffrey Glenn Hutchinson (May 1, 2025).

=== Last ditch appeals ===
On May 5, Rogers appealed to the Florida Supreme Court to stop his execution, arguing that sexual abuse suffered as a child should have been taken into account during the sentencing phase of his trial, as well as concerns over the lethal injection drugs. The court denied Rogers's appeal on May 9.

As a last resort, Rogers's attorneys appealed to the Supreme Court of the United States to stop the impending execution. The Supreme Court rejected the appeal on May 14, 2025, the eve of Rogers' execution.

=== Lethal injection ===
On May 15, 2025, 62-year-old Rogers was put to death by lethal injection at the Florida State Prison. The official time of death was 6:16 p.m. His last meal consisted of pizza, chocolate cake, and soda. Rogers was the 16th person in the United States to be executed in 2025, and the fifth offender on Florida's death row to be executed in the state that year.

In a final statement, Rogers addressed the family members of his victims and also incumbent U.S. President Donald Trump, "I know there's a lot of questions that you need answers to. I promise you in the near future the questions will be answered and I hope in some way will bring you closure. President Trump, keep making America great. I'm ready to go."

=== Responses ===
Jerri Vallicella, the sister of Sandra Gallagher, stated that she would finally be able to rest peacefully after the execution of Rogers. She stated that she and her family had waited for nearly 30 years for his death sentence to be carried out, and that his execution would provide a sense of safety for her, knowing that Rogers could not harm anyone else.

Debbie Spikes, the older sister of Linda Price, stated that her family found closure after the execution of Rogers, although stating that it was hard to see. She expressed her anger at Rogers for not showing any remorse for his crimes. Spikes, her husband Ronnie, her sister, and her mother all attended the execution of Rogers.

Randy Roberson, the son of Andy Jiles Sutton, stated the execution also provided him closure, but stated that his death was too peaceful for his crime. He stated that his death was too "easy" and it looked like he was "going to sleep"

== O. J. Simpson connection ==
A 2012 documentary entitled My Brother the Serial Killer examined Rogers's crimes and included claims that Rogers had killed Nicole Brown Simpson and Ron Goldman in California in 1994. According to Rogers' brother Clay, Rogers claimed that, before the murders, he had met Brown and was "going to take her down." During a lengthy correspondence that began in 2009 between Rogers and criminal profiler Anthony Meoli, Rogers wrote and created paintings about his involvement with the murders. During a prison meeting between the two, Rogers claimed O.J. Simpson hired him to break into Nicole Brown Simpson's house and steal some expensive jewelry. He said that Simpson had told him, "You may have to kill the bitch". In a filmed interview, Glen's brother Clay asserts that his brother confessed his involvement.

Rogers' family stated that he had informed them that he had been working for Nicole in 1994 and that he had made verbal threats about her to them. Rogers is purported to have given detailed video statements addressing his actions in connection with the murder of Nicole Brown Simpson and other cases to his attorney. Publication is forthcoming.

LAPD responded to the documentary as follows: "We know who killed Nicole Brown Simpson and Ron Goldman. We have no reason to believe that Mr. Rogers was involved." Fred Goldman, father of Ron Goldman stated: "The overwhelming evidence at the criminal trial proved that one, and only one, person murdered Nicole Brown Simpson and Ronald Goldman. That person is O.J. Simpson and not Glen Rogers."

== Television and film ==
Rogers was the subject of an episode of The FBI Files, titled "Deadly Stranger" (Season 3, Episode 12). He was also the subject of an episode of Southern Fried Homicide, titled "Smooth Talking Devil" (Season 3, Episode 2) on Investigation Discovery.

The Oxygen channel's series It Takes a Killer episode, "The Casanova Killer", (run time: 22 minutes, air date: September 2, 2016) focuses on four of the murders linked to Rogers and the manhunt leading to his capture.

The film The Murder of Nicole Brown Simpson (2019) purports to tell the story as asserted by Rogers and his family about his involvement with Nicole Brown Simpson. Rogers is portrayed by Nick Stahl, and Mena Suvari portrays Nicole Brown Simpson.

== See also ==
- Capital punishment in Florida
- List of people executed in Florida
- List of people executed in the United States in 2025
- List of serial killers in the United States
- Kelvin Malone, sentenced to death in California but executed in a different state
- Alfredo Prieto, sentenced to death in California but executed in a different state

== Bibliography ==
- Combs, Stephen M; Eckberg, J. Road Dog. Federal Point Pub Inc, 2002 ISBN 0-966-82591-8
- Linedecker, Clifford L. Smooth Operator: The True Story of Seductive Serial Killer Glen Rogers. St. Martin's True Crime Classics, 1997 ISBN 0-312-96400-5
- Spizer, J. The Cross Country Killer. Top Publications, Ltd., 2001 ISBN 1-929-97611-9

Executions carried out in Florida
Preceded by Jeffrey Hutchinson May 1, 2025	Glen Edward Rogers; May 15, 2025	Succeeded by Anthony Wainwright June 10, 2025
Executions carried out in the United States
Preceded by Jeffrey Hutchinson – Florida May 1, 2025	Glen Edward Rogers – Florida; May 15, 2025	Succeeded by Benjamin Ritchie – Indiana May 20, 2025
