= Jeffrey Hutchinson =

Executed American convicted mass murderer (1962–2025)

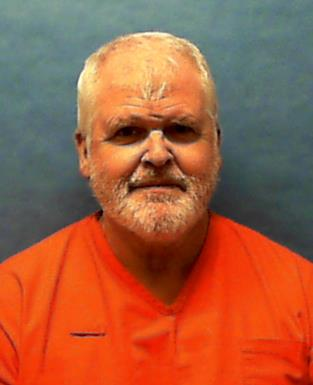
- Mug shot of Hutchinson
- Born: November 6, 1962; Alaska, U.S.
- Died: May 1, 2025 (aged 62); Florida State Prison, Florida, U.S.
- Status: Executed by lethal injection
- Conviction: First degree murder (4 counts)
- Penalty: Death

Details
- Victims: 4
- Date: September 11, 1998
- Country: United States
- Location: Crestview, Florida
- Weapon: Mossberg 12-gauge shotgun
- Imprisoned at: Florida State Prison

Jeffrey Glenn Hutchinson (November 6, 1962 – May 1, 2025) was an American convicted mass murderer who was sentenced to death for a 1998 quadruple homicide in Crestview, Florida. On September 11, 1998, Hutchinson, an Army veteran who had fought in the Gulf War, shot and killed his 32-year-old live-in girlfriend Renee Flaherty, along with her three children: Geoffrey (aged nine), Amanda (aged seven) and Logan (aged four).

During his trial, Hutchinson claimed diminished responsibility due to alcohol intoxication and mental disorders like the Gulf War syndrome in his defense. Nonetheless, he was found guilty of the mass murder and received three death sentences for the children's murders, as well as a life sentence for the murder of his girlfriend.

Hutchinson was executed at the Florida State Prison on May 1, 2025.

== Background and crime ==
=== Personal life ===
Jeffrey Glenn Hutchinson was born on November 6, 1962, in Alaska, and grew up in Kettle Falls, Washington, with several brothers and sisters. By all sources Hutchinson had a normal childhood, but he was reportedly diagnosed with attention deficit hyperactivity disorder (ADHD) as a child.

After completing high school, Hutchinson worked as a mechanic and security guard at varied points in his life and commended as a model employee in his respective line of work. Hutchinson later joined the U.S. Army and became a paratrooper and Army Ranger. Hutchinson subsequently fought in the Gulf War and was a participant in Operation Desert Storm. However, after he returned to the United States, the aftereffects of the war and trauma took a toll on Hutchinson's mental state, as noted by his family, and he was honorably discharged from the military some time after. Hutchinson's first marriage ended with a divorce after the completion of his war service and his second marriage was similarly short-lived.

=== Flaherty family murders ===
On September 11, 1998, Hutchinson committed the quadruple murder of his live-in girlfriend and her three children at their house in Crestview, Florida.

Prior to the slayings, Hutchinson had begun a relationship with his girlfriend, Renee Flaherty, and the couple began living together from 1997. Renee's three children – Geoffrey, Amanda and Logan – lived together with their mother, and together, Hutchinson and the Flaherty family moved from Spokane, Washington to Florida. At the time when she began a relationship with Hutchinson, Renee was estranged from her husband, who was a military man stationed in Alaska's Aleutian Islands.

On the evening of September 11, 1998, the 18th month of the couple's cohabitation, a fierce argument broke out between Hutchinson and Renee for unspecified reasons before Hutchinson packed some of his clothes and guns into his truck, and drove to a bar, where he drank some alcohol and told the bartender (with whom he and Renee were acquainted) that he was "pissed off" with his girlfriend (who called a friend from Washington about the fight).

Afterwards, Hutchinson returned to the house, and using a Mossberg 12-gauge pistol-grip shotgun, Hutchinson shot and killed Renee and her three children, less than an hour after he left the bar. Hutchinson later called the police and informed them that his family had been shot, and he was subsequently arrested at the scene. Renee and her two younger children, Logan and Amanda, were found dead inside the bedroom while Renee's eldest child, Geoffrey, was found dead inside the living room. Each of the victims was shot once in the head, with Geoffrey sustaining an additional gunshot wound to the chest. Hutchinson, who reportedly did not resist arrest, was held at the Okaloosa County Jail thereafter.

== Death penalty trial ==
=== Charges and pre-trial process ===
After his arrest, Jeffrey Hutchinson was charged with four counts of first-degree murder. After his father was arrested, Hutchinson's 12-year-old son told a newspaper that his father had been diagnosed with Gulf War syndrome (as a result of his participation in the war) and implied that the disorder had affected his conduct at the time of the murders.

On October 5, 1998, an Okaloosa County grand jury indicted Hutchinson on four counts of first-degree premeditated murder, which were offences that warrant the death penalty under Florida state law.

Originally, Hutchinson was supposed to stand trial in September 1999. However, it was delayed to January 2000 after Hutchinson fired his two lawyers. In December 1999, the trial date was pushed back to March 2000, after Hutchinson was granted time to prepare for an insanity defence through his new lawyers' advice.

The trial date was later pushed back to June 2000, and a month before the trial was slated to begin, Hutchinson proclaimed that he wanted to represent himself without a lawyer in May 2000. Hutchinson later changed his mind and decided to retain his counsel.

Subsequently, the trial was delayed once again to July 2000, and another trial date delay was made as Assistant State Attorney Bobby Elmore, the leading prosecutor of the trial, suffered a heart attack and needed time to recuperate, and Hutchinson himself also filed a complaint against his lawyers.

On January 7, 2001, Circuit Judge G. Robert Barron found that Hutchinson was mentally competent to stand trial for the murders of the Flahertys, and the jury selection was scheduled for the next day.

=== Trial and verdict ===
On January 8, 2001, Hutchinson stood trial for the murders of the Flahertys. Evidence adduced at trial showed that when he was first arrested, Hutchinson had gunshot residue on his hands, and also had Geoffrey's body tissue on his leg. Five shells linked to Hutchinson's shotgun were also recovered by police from the kitchen counter.

In his defence, Hutchinson claimed to be innocent, stating that there were two men donning ski masks who barged into the house to attack him and the Flahertys, Hutchinson claimed that he struggled with them, and they shot Renee and the children before fleeing the house. Alternatively, Hutchinson stated that he was heavily intoxicated with alcohol at the time and it was not first-degree murder, but a crime of passion.

On January 18, 2001, after a trial lasting nine days, the jury found Hutchinson guilty of all four counts of first-degree murder.

Before the sentencing trial, Hutchinson waived his right to be sentenced by a jury, and as a result, the trial judge would solely sentence Hutchinson to either life imprisonment or to death. Dr Vincent Dillon, who was summoned by the defence, stated that Hutchinson had suffered from a bipolar disorder and alcohol intoxication at the time of the offences, making him ineligible to face capital punishment.

On February 6, 2001, Hutchinson was sentenced to death for murdering the children and life imprisonment for murdering his girlfriend. In a brief statement after his sentencing, Hutchinson proclaimed his innocence. Melva Elmore, Renee's mother, stated that justice had prevailed in response to Hutchinson's death sentence.

In his sentencing verdict, Circuit Judge G. Robert Barton rejected the defence of diminished responsibility due to mental illness and alcohol intoxication, and found that the Gulf War syndrome had no correlation to the murders. Barton found that the death of Renee did not merit a death sentence for Hutchinson, due to the lack of criminal records and his military service, and opted for life without parole. However, in the case of the children, Barton issued three death sentences as he regarded the children's young ages as additional aggravating factors and particularly in the case of Geoffrey's death, Hutchinson mercilessly shot the boy in the head and killed him as Geoffrey did not die from the shotgun wound on his chest, which made his murder "especially heinous, atrocious and cruel".

A day after his sentencing, Hutchinson was officially transferred to death row at the Florida State Prison.

== Appeal process ==
In November 2002, Jeffrey Hutchinson filed an appeal against his death sentence and murder conviction. On July 1, 2004, the Florida Supreme Court rejected Hutchinson's direct appeal against his death sentence. In their judgement, the court rejected Hutchinson's argument that the death sentences were unwarranted due to his lack of history of violence and the multiple murders were domestic in nature, and pointed out that in fatal domestic disputes, it did not exempt an offender from capital punishment, and further noted that the murders involved three defenseless young children and their own mother, which outweighed any mitigating factors and carried greater weight in favor of the death penalty.

On July 9, 2009, Hutchinson's second appeal to the Florida Supreme Court was also rejected. On April 19, 2012, the 11th Circuit Court of Appeals rejected Hutchinson's appeal. On June 12, 2013, the United States District Court for the Northern District of Florida dismissed Hutchinson's appeal. On March 15, 2018, the Florida Supreme Court turned down Hutchinson's fourth appeal.

On June 16, 2022, the Florida Supreme Court rejected Hutchinson's fourth appeal. Hutchinson argued in this appeal that fresh evidence had emerged that could prove he was not the killer, centering around the FBI investigation of two key prosecution witnesses for separate offences, but the court unanimously rejected the arguments on the grounds that the unrelated involvement of the FBI and their evidence of the witnesses would not have warranted an acquittal of Hutchinson in any re-trial for the killings, especially since the evidence of the FBI did not corroborate the possibility of another killer or discredit the identity of Hutchinson as the caller who dialed 911, and that the forensic evidence also showed there was an absence of defensive wounds and existence of the victims' DNA and gunshot residue on Hutchinson's body.

== Execution ==
=== Death warrant ===
On April 1, 2025, Governor Ron DeSantis signed the death warrant of Jeffrey Hutchinson, scheduling him to be put to death on May 1, 2025, by lethal injection. Hutchinson was the fourth inmate from Florida to have his execution scheduled in 2025, after James Dennis Ford (February 13, 2025), Edward Thomas James (March 20, 2025), and Michael Anthony Tanzi (April 8, 2025).

=== Final appeals ===
On April 4, 2025, Okaloosa County Circuit Judge Lacey Powell Clark rejected Hutchinson's appeal, which had been filed after Hutchinson was notified of his execution date. On April 21, 2025, the Florida Supreme Court dismissed Hutchinson's appeal against his death sentence. Hutchinson's lawyers continued to argue that he had brain damage and cognitive impairment from injuries suffered during the Gulf War, and his symptoms warranted either an acquittal of first-degree murder charges or the commutation of his death sentence to life without parole, but the court rejected the arguments and cited that these submissions and Hutchinson's symptoms had already been known during or before the trial.

On April 25, 2025, the Florida Supreme Court rejected a second appeal from Hutchinson. The 11th U.S. Circuit Court of Appeals likewise dismissed Hutchinson's federal appeal during that same week itself. Meanwhile, Maria DeLiberato, executive director of Floridians for Alternatives for the Death Penalty and liaison for Hutchinson's legal team, advocated for a complete and fair hearing of Hutchinson's case, stating that Hutchinson's competency to be executed should be questioned based on the fact that his trauma from fighting the Gulf War had psychologically affected him. While DeLiberato agreed that Hutchinson was indeed guilty of murdering the Flahertys, she stated that Hutchinson's insistence that he was innocent and his story of home invaders killing the Flahertys were possible indications of delusional beliefs caused by severe mental illness and brain damage, and she thus advocated for Hutchinson's life to be spared.

On April 27, 2025, Bradford County Circuit Judge James Colaw rejected another appeal from Hutchinson, dismissing his claims of mental illness and found him mentally competent to be executed. Ultimately, shortly before his execution on May 1, 2025, the U.S. Supreme Court dismissed Hutchinson's final appeal.

=== Responses ===
In response to the upcoming execution of Hutchinson, Wesley Elmore, the brother of Renee Flaherty and the uncle of her three children, spoke out in the media, stating that he had no doubt that Hutchinson killed his sister and the children. Elmore also said he planned to fly from Washington to Florida to witness the execution of Hutchinson and felt that he deserved to be executed for having brutally murdered his sister and her children. Hutchinson's family members, on the other hand, including his niece and brother, maintained that he was innocent and claimed he had not received a fair trial. They claimed that the caller on the phone had had a slight Southern accent that did not belong to Hutchinson, and further claimed that the DNA evidence had failed to show that he was the real killer because the murder weapon had been broken and no DNA links were made to the blood spatter on Hutchinson's body.

In another interview, Elmore told USA Today that his sister, whom he often confided with the most, was a tomboy who had a tough personality as the only daughter raised alongside three sons in her childhood, and she worked hard to make a living for herself and her three children even after she divorced and became a single parent. Elmore also lamented that his nephews and niece never got to grow up as adults, revealing the close bond he had had with them. Elmore stated that prior to the murders, he had entrusted his sister and the children to Hutchinson and believed he could take care of them, a promise that ended up broken with Hutchinson's involvement in their deaths.

=== Lethal injection ===
On May 1, 2025, 62-year-old Hutchinson was put to death by lethal injection in Florida State Prison. The official time of death was 8:15 p.m. His last meal consisted of salmon, mahi-mahi, asparagus, baked potato and iced tea. He had no last words. Hutchinson was the 15th person in the United States to be executed during the year 2025, and also the fourth offender on Florida's death row to be executed in the state that same year.

== Aftermath ==
The Flaherty family murders brought shock to the whole community and Okaloosa County when the killings happened. The case, which happened four years after Edward J. Zakrzewski killed his two children and wife, became the worst homicide in the county. After the murders took place, counselors were sent to the Antioch Elementary School, which the two older children (Amanda and Geoffrey) had attended, to monitor the welfare of the students after the school resumed classes.

In January 2016, when 22-year-old Jacob Langston shot and murdered his mother, stepfather and his ex-fiancée's new lover, coincidentally at the same location where the Flaherty family murders occurred back in 1998, the brutality of Langston's murder spree brought the case of Hutchinson back into the spotlight, with members of the community expressing their feelings towards the Hutchinson case and stating they had never forgotten about the tragedy even after more than 17 years since it happened. Langston was subsequently convicted and given three consecutive life sentences without parole for the triple murder in September 2021.

In October 2018, the Flaherty family murders were listed as one of the most heinous crimes committed in Northwest Florida, with Hutchinson being one of the only 17 offenders sentenced to death for the cases on the list.

== See also ==
- Capital punishment in Florida
- List of people executed in Florida
- List of people executed in the United States in 2025
- Daryl Holton – Another Gulf War veteran who was executed for committing a similar mass murder.

Executions carried out in Florida
Preceded by Michael Tanzi April 8, 2025	Jeffrey Hutchinson; May 1, 2025	Succeeded by Glen Edward Rogers May 15, 2025
Executions carried out in the United States
Preceded by James Lee Osgood – Alabama April 24, 2025	Jeffrey Hutchinson – Florida; May 1, 2025	Succeeded by Glen Edward Rogers - Florida May 15, 2025
