= Murder of Janet Acosta =

2000 kidnapping and murder of a woman in Florida

Janet Acosta
- Undated photo of Acosta
- Born: 1951
- Died: April 25, 2000 (aged 49); Monroe County, Florida, U.S.
- Cause of death: Strangulation
- Occupation: Miami Herald employee

On April 25, 2000, in Cudjoe Key, Florida, United States, 49-year-old Janet Acosta (1951 – April 25, 2000) was murdered by Michael Anthony Tanzi who kidnapped her in Miami-Dade County while she was on her lunch break, raped her, stole her van, and drove her to the Florida Keys. He then forced her to withdraw money from an ATM, and eventually strangled her to death before burying her in a secluded area. Tanzi was found guilty of first degree murder and sentenced to death in 2003. He was executed by lethal injection on April 8, 2025.

Less than a week before his execution, Tanzi's defense team claimed Tanzi's weight and health would result in a botched execution. His defense argued that lethal injection would violate the Eighth Amendment's ban on cruel or unusual punishment. The argument was rejected by the Florida Attorney General's office, stating that Tanzi's defense provided no evidence that the method would violate the Eighth Amendment.

== Background ==
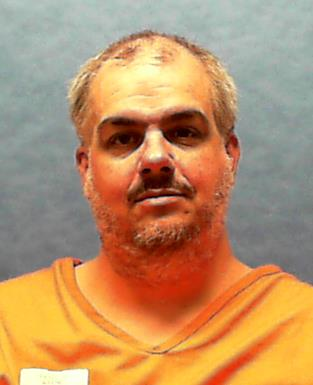
Michael Anthony Tanzi

Michael Anthony Tanzi was born on February 27, 1977, in the suburbs of Boston. His childhood was described as one full of loss, abuse and a lack of stability. Tanzi's lawyers said he was sexually molested by a childhood friend and physically and emotionally abused by his father. Tanzi's father became more violent toward his son as he was diagnosed with pancreatic cancer. According to Tanzi's mother, the abuse made Tanzi become more disruptive, angry and troublesome. One of Tanzi's friends said that Tanzi's father once slammed Tanzi's head into the side of a truck. Meanwhile his mother was not home that much, according to the friend. Tanzi also had many problems in school, academically and socially. His mother said he did not get along with too many kids and was fighting with them over something regularly. When Tanzi was around 11, his mother tried to take him to a meeting for sexual abuse victims, something he was vehemently against. His mother said he did not want to talk to her about anything that happened to him.

=== Early crimes and Holder murder ===
Tanzi began committing a string of crimes in the suburbs of Boston as a young man. He was arrested in 1998, when he was around 21 years old, after stealing a van and breaking into a home in the Boston suburb of Brockton. He was sentenced to 18 months in prison but only served six months and was released in August 1999. After Tanzi's arrest for Acosta's murder, police say he confessed to killing 37-year-old Caroline D. Holder (1962 – August 11, 1999) in Brockton, Massachusetts, months earlier. Holder was stabbed to death and beaten while she was working at a laundromat. Tanzi was never charged with her murder because of his death sentence.

== Murder ==
On April 25, 2000, Janet Acosta, a 49-year-old production worker at the Miami Herald, was abducted during her lunch break and murdered by Tanzi. The crime, which spanned from Miami to the Florida Keys, involved a brutal assault, kidnapping, robbery, and sexual battery, culminating in Acosta's strangulation in Cudjoe Key.

On the day of the attack, Acosta was sitting in her van reading a book under a shaded tree at the Japanese Rock Gardens on Watson Island in Miami during her lunch hour. Tanzi, 23 years old and stranded in Miami, approached the vehicle, asking for a cigarette and the time. When Acosta was distracted, Tanzi repeatedly punched her in the face, forced his way into the van, and threatened her with a razor blade.

According to federal court records, Tanzi held Acosta by the wrist as he drove away from the Japanese Gardens and headed south toward Homestead.

Tanzi drove the van to Homestead, Florida, where he stopped at a gas station. There, he bound and gagged Acosta using rope and a towel he found in her van. He stole $53 in cash and her bank card. According to court records, Tanzi also sexually battered Acosta, forcing her to perform oral sex but stopping because her teeth had been loosened during the initial beating.

From Homestead, Tanzi drove south into the Florida Keys, arriving in Tavernier around 5:15 p.m. He used Acosta's bank card to withdraw money from her account and then stopped at a hardware store to purchase duct tape and razor blades. He continued driving to an isolated area on Cudjoe Key. There, Tanzi told Acosta he was going to kill her and began to strangle her with a rope. According to his confession, he paused the attack to place duct tape over her mouth, nose, and eyes to quiet her before continuing to strangle her until she died. He then left her body in a wooded area.

After murdering Acosta, Tanzi drove Acosta's van to Key West, where he used her ATM card, bought marijuana, and visited friends. Meanwhile, Acosta's friends and co-workers had reported her missing when she failed to return from her lunch break, prompting a police search. Two days after the murder, police located Acosta's van in Key West and approached Tanzi as he was getting into it. When confronted, Tanzi had receipts from his use of Acosta's ATM card in his pocket and told officers he "knew what this was about". He waived his rights and gave a detailed audio and videotaped confession to the assault, abduction, robbery, sexual battery, and murder. He also led investigators to the location where he had hidden Acosta's body and disposed of the duct tape and rope. Tanzi told police he could not let Acosta go because he would get caught more quickly.

== Death penalty trial ==
=== Charges and pre-trial process ===
Michael Tanzi was indicted on charges of first-degree murder, carjacking with a weapon, kidnapping to facilitate a felony with a weapon armed robbery with a deadly weapon, and two counts of sexual battery with a deadly weapon, all related to the crimes against Janet Acosta. Initially Tanzi entered a plea of not guilty to the charges. However, shortly before his trial was scheduled to begin, Tanzi changed his plea. As part of this development, the two counts of sexual battery were severed.

Tanzi's decision to plead guilty to these specific felonies had significant strategic implications for his case. By admitting guilt to first-degree murder, carjacking, kidnapping, and armed robbery, he conceded the factual basis for several powerful statutory aggravating circumstances, most notably that the murder was committed during the commission of these other violent felonies. This admission effectively shifted the entire focus of the legal proceedings to the penalty phase, where the central question would be whether he should receive a sentence of life imprisonment or death.

Hours after entering his guilty plea, and following the trial court's denial of his motion to waive a penalty phase jury, Tanzi expressed a desire to withdraw his plea. He voiced dissatisfaction with his legal counsel and vaguely suggested he should have a guilt-phase jury trial. During this period, Tanzi made several confusing pro se allegations, including claims of an inappropriate relationship with his lead counsel, incompetence of his attorneys, and a belief that the plea was a waste of the court's time.

=== Trial and verdict ===
Following Michael Tanzi's guilty plea to first-degree murder and other felonies, a penalty phase trial was convened before a jury. Tanzi's earlier motion to waive this penalty phase jury had been denied by the court. The purpose of this phase was for the jury to hear evidence regarding aggravating circumstances presented by the prosecution and mitigating circumstances presented by the defense, and subsequently to recommend a sentence to the judge.

The prosecution presented evidence aimed at establishing statutory aggravating circumstances that would warrant a sentence of death. The trial court assigned "great weight" to most of these aggravating circumstances. Notably, the HAC (heinous, atrocious, or cruel) aggravator was given "utmost weight" by the court, underscoring its perceived significance in the case. The finding of HAC often plays a decisive role in death penalty sentencing due to the extreme physical or psychological pain and suffering it implies for the victim. The details of Acosta's abduction, being bound, gagged, threatened, sexually battered, and ultimately strangled, with Tanzi stopping to apply duct tape to her face to silence her, strongly supported this finding and likely influenced the court's decision to assign it such substantial weight.

In total, the state trial court found seven statutory aggravating circumstances beyond a reasonable doubt: (1) that the murder was committed by a person previously convicted of a felony and under sentence of imprisonment or on felony probation; (2) that the murder was committed during the commission of a kidnapping; (3) that the murder was committed during the commission of two sexual batteries; (4) that the crime was committed for the purpose of avoiding arrest; (5) that the murder was committed for pecuniary gain; (6) that the murder was especially heinous, atrocious, or cruel (HAC); and (7) that the murder was committed in a cold, calculated, and premeditated (CCP) manner.

The defense presented substantial mitigating evidence, focusing on Tanzi's troubled background, history of abuse, and extensive mental health issues. Testifying for the defense were two mental health experts—Dr. Vicary, a psychiatrist, and Dr. Raphael, a psychologist—a forensics social worker specializing in sexual behavior problems, and a counselor from a homeless shelter where Tanzi had stayed. Tanzi's mother also testified, providing details about his difficult childhood, the verbal and physical abuse he suffered from his father, significant behavioral changes in Tanzi following his father's illness and death, and the prolonged sexual abuse Tanzi endured from an older boy starting when Tanzi was eight years old.

Key themes in the mitigation case included Tanzi's diagnoses of polysubstance dependence, PTSD, exhibitionism, sexual sadism, voyeurism, ADHD, a learning disability, bereavement issues, and antisocial personality disorder. Dr. Raphael also testified that his firm suspected, and could not rule out, schizophrenia, schizoaffective disorder, or another psychotic disorder. Dr. Vicary provided a diagnosis of bipolar disorder. Further mitigating evidence included Tanzi's history of institutionalization as a youth, his cooperation with law enforcement by confessing and leading them to Acosta's body, and his history of substance abuse.

Just prior to the evidentiary presentation of the penalty phase, the prosecution disclosed to Tanzi's defense team that an analyst with the Florida Department of Law Enforcement (FDLE) had observed an increased presence of Y chromosomes during DNA analysis, suggesting Tanzi might possess an XYY genetic genotype. Additionally, the state notified the defense of its intention to impeach Dr. Vicary using California medical board disciplinary records stemming from his prior involvement in the high-profile Menendez brothers case, where Dr. Vicary had rewritten his notes and deleted damaging passages at the direction of defense counsel.

On February 19, 2003, after hearing all the evidence in the penalty phase, the jury returned a 12-0 recommendation for a sentence of death.

On April 11, 2003, the trial court followed the jury's unanimous recommendation and formally sentenced Tanzi to death for the first-degree murder of Acosta. In its sentencing order, the court found that the seven established aggravating circumstances "greatly outweighed" the ten mitigating circumstances. The sheer number and gravity of the aggravators, particularly the "heinous, atrocious, or cruel" nature of the murder and its commission in a "cold, calculated, and premeditated" manner, proved overwhelming despite the substantial and compelling mitigation case presented by the defense.

In addition to the death sentence, Tanzi was also sentenced to consecutive life sentences for the convictions of carjacking with a deadly weapon, kidnapping to facilitate a felony with a deadly weapon, and armed robbery with a deadly weapon.

== Appeals ==
Following his 2003 conviction and death sentence, Michael Tanzi engaged in a continuous, two-decade long series of legal challenges in both state and federal courts.

In his direct appeal to the Florida Supreme Court, Tanzi's primary argument centered on the 2002 U.S. Supreme Court decision in Ring v. Arizona. Tanzi's attorneys argued that Florida's capital sentencing scheme was unconstitutional because it allowed a judge, rather than the jury, to make the final factual findings on the existence of aggravating circumstances required to impose a death sentence. On May 10, 2007, the court rejected Tanzi's Ring claim and affirmed his convictions and death sentence.

On direct appeal, the Florida Supreme Court also addressed Tanzi's challenge regarding the prosecutor's cross-examination of Dr. Vicary concerning his license suspension in California. The state supreme court ruled that this line of questioning was permissible because it directly related to witness credibility and potential bias.

On February 19, 2008, the U.S. Supreme Court denied Tanzi's position for writ of certiorari.

In 2009, Tanzi filed a motion for postconviction relief under Fl. R. Crim. P. 3.851. The central claim was that he had received ineffective assistance of counsel during the penalty phase of his trial. On March 22, 2010, the 16th Circuit Court of Florida denied his appeal. On April 19, 2012, the Florida Supreme Court also denied relief.

On April 19, 2012, the Florida Supreme Court also denied Tanzi's state habeas corpus proceeding.

On February 27, 2013, the U.S. District Court for the Southern District of Florida denied Tanzi's federal habeas corpus proceeding. November 19, 2014, the 11th Circuit Court of Appeals denied federal habeas corpus. On October 5, 2015, the U.S. Supreme Court also denied this appeal.

In its November 19, 2014 decision, the U.S. Court of Appeals for the Eleventh Circuit addressed the two claims certified for federal habeas appeal under 28 U.S.C. § 2254: whether Tanzi received ineffective assistance of penalty-phase counsel and whether the late disclosure regarding his potential XYY genetic condition constituted a Brady v. Maryland violation. Applying the standard required by the Antiterrorism and Effective Death Penalty Act of 1996 (AEDPA), the Eleventh Circuit affirmed the district court's denial of habeas relief. The federal appeals court concluded that the Florida Supreme Court’s prior rejection of both the ineffective assistance and Brady claims on the merits was neither contrary to, nor an unreasonable application of, clearly established Supreme Court precedent.

In 2016, the U.S. Supreme Court issued its landmark decision in Hurst v. Florida, which fundamentally altered capital sentencing in the state. Following this decision, Tanzi's attorneys filed a successive postconviction motion, arguing that the Hurst ruling applied retroactively to his case and rendered his death sentence unconstitutional. On April 24, 2017, 16th Circuit Court of Florida his appeal. On April 5, 2018, the Florida Supreme Court denied the appeal. On November 13, 2018, the U.S. Supreme Court also denied postconviction relief.

On March 19, 2025, the 16th Circuit Court of Florida denied Tanzi's successive motion.

On April 1, 2025, the Florida Supreme Court affirmed the denial of Tanzi's motion and also denied writ of habeas corpus.

== Execution ==
=== Death warrant ===
On March 10, 2025, Governor Ron DeSantis signed Tanzi's death warrant, scheduling him to be put to death on April 8, 2025, by lethal injection. Tanzi was the third inmate from Florida to have his execution scheduled in 2025, after James Dennis Ford (February 13, 2025) and Edward Thomas James (March 20, 2025).

=== Last-ditch appeals ===
To try to avoid execution, Tanzi's lawyers filed an appeal saying he was too obese and that executing him using lethal injection is too risky. Florida Supreme Court denied appeal.

Tanzi's attorneys filed a final appeal for a stay of execution and a petition for a writ of certiorari with the U.S. Supreme Court. On April 8, 2025, just hours before the scheduled execution, the U.S. Supreme Court denied Tanzi's application for a stay and his petition for certiorari.

=== Lethal injection ===
On the evening of April 8, 48-year-old Tanzi was put to death by lethal injection at Florida State Prison and pronounced dead at 6:12 p.m., in his final statement Tanzi said: ''I want to apologize to the family of Janet Acosta and Caroline Holder for taking their lives'' and then he read a Bible verse. His last meal consisted of a pork chop, bacon, a baked potato, corn, soda, ice cream, and a candy bar.

First-person media reports from inside the witness gallery at Florida State Prison described the execution environment as sterile and clinical as the three-drug lethal injection process was administered. Anti-death penalty protesters gathered outside the prison facility, contrasting with victim advocates who assembled in support of the execution.

== Aftermath ==
Acosta's sister, Julie Andrew, and niece, Jennifer Vanderwier, attended Tanzi's execution. After it was done, they said it brought them closure: "It's over. It's done. Justice for Janet happened. My heart just felt lighter, and I could breathe again. Today is about Janet Acosta, and the life she lived, and the legacy she left behind." Vanderwier described Acosta as adventurous with an "outrageous sense of humor."

== See also ==
- List of people executed in Florida
- List of people executed in the United States in 2025

Executions carried out in Florida
Preceded by Eddie James March 20, 2025	Michael Tanzi; April 8, 2025	Succeeded by Jeffrey Hutchinson May 1, 2025
Executions carried out in the United States
Preceded by Eddie James – Florida March 20, 2025	Michael Tanzi – Florida; April 8, 2025	Succeeded by Mikal Mahdi – South Carolina April 11, 2025
