= Murder of Rachelle Tolleson =

2004 murder and rape of a mother in Texas

- Rachelle Tolleson prior her murder.
- Location: Collin County, Texas, United States
- Date: March 18, 2004
- Attack type: Murder and rape
- Victim: Rachelle Lynne O'Neil-Tolleson
- Perpetrator: Moises Sandoval Mendoza
- Charges: Capital murder, rape, kidnapping

On March 18, 2004, in Farmersville, Texas, 20-year-old Rachelle O'Neil Tolleson (January 20, 1984 – March 18, 2004) was kidnapped, raped and murdered by Moises Sandoval Mendoza (January 26, 1984 – April 23, 2025), who stabbed her in the throat and strangled her, and then disposed of the body by burning it. Mendoza was found guilty of capital murder and sentenced to death in 2005, and executed by lethal injection on April 23, 2025.

== Murder ==
On March 18, 2004, 20-year-old Rachelle O’Neil Tolleson disappeared from her home in Farmersville, Texas, where she lived alone with her 6-month-old daughter, Avery, while going through a divorce. That morning, her daughter was found alone at home, and Tolleson was reported missing. According to Tolleson's mother, who discovered her daughter's disappearance, the back door had been left wide open. Inside the bedroom, everything was in disarray— the mattress and box spring were misaligned, the headboard was damaged, furniture was out of position, and papers and various items were strewn across the room.

According to court documents, prior to Tolleson's disappearance, Moises Mendoza, an acquaintance of Tolleson's from high school, entered her house through an unlocked back door during the night. Although it was the prosecution's contention that Mendoza had abducted Tolleson from her home, Mendoza claimed to investigators that that the two left together briefly to get cigarettes, leaving the baby behind. While driving, Mendoza went violent and choked Tolleson until she lost consciousness. After this, Mendoza took Tolleson to a secluded area near his home, where he raped her before he strangled her to death and stabbed her in the throat.

After murdering Tolleson, Mendoza left Tolleson's body in the field for a few days, before he returned to the murder site and brought the body (which he wrapped in a tarp) to his cousin's land in Farmersville, where he disposed of it by burning it and placing it in a creek bed.

On March 23, 2004, Tolleson's remains were discovered and through her dental records, the police identified Tolleson as the victim. Mendoza was arrested the next day, after he reportedly told a friend that he killed Tolleson.

== Trial of Moises Sandoval Mendoza ==
=== Personal life ===
Moises Sandoval Mendoza prior his execution.

Born on January 26, 1984, in Mexico, Moises Sandoval Mendoza grew up in northern Texas, where he attended grade school alongside his victim, Rachelle Tolleson. Described in his early years as a hardworking individual, Mendoza began to show troubling behavior as he got older. Neighbors recalled a disturbing incident in which he violently pinned down his mother and sister in their front yard.

Mendoza graduated from high school with decent academic performance, earning several scholarships. He also completed approximately nine months of training in heating and air-conditioning after graduation. However, his life soon took a darker turn. In 2003, Mendoza was arrested in connection with two aggravated robberies on the Dallas College Richland Campus. At the time Tolleson went missing, Mendoza was out on bail for one of those charges. Just days before the murder of Tolleson, Mendoza had attended a small party at Tolleson's house with around 15 people.

=== Trial and sentencing ===
In 2005, Mendoza stood trial before a Collin County jury for the capital murder of Rachelle Tolleson in the course of attempted burglary, kidnapping and/or aggravated sexual assault.

During the trial, clinical psychologist Mark Vigen characterized Mendoza as emotionally immature and lacking psychological development. He noted that Mendoza seemed to take pleasure in being deceptive and often reacted with anger when faced with criticism, according to court testimony. The jury also heard evidence of Mendoza's long history of violence against women, including instances of physically assaulting his mother and sister and sexually assaulting a 14-year-old girl. After the completion of the trial, Mendoza was convicted by the jury of capital murder.

On June 29, 2005, Mendoza was sentenced to death by the trial judge upon the jury's unanimous recommendation for capital punishment. During Mendoza's sentencing, former Collin County First Assistant District Attorney Greg Davis described Mendoza as "one of the most violent, sadistic men" he ever came across in his years as a prosecutor.

== Appeals ==
After he was sentenced to death, Moises Mendoza appealed against his death sentence and murder conviction. The Texas Court of Criminal Appeals rejected Mendoza's appeal in November 2008.

On May 30, 2009, the Texas Court of Criminal Appeals dismissed another appeal from Mendoza against his death sentence. Further appeals were rejected by the U.S. District Court for the Eastern District of Texas on September 28, 2012; the 5th Circuit Court of Appeals on March 30, 2015; the U.S. District Court for the Eastern District of Texas on April 23, 2019; and the 5th Circuit Court of Appeals on August 31, 2023.

On October 7, 2024, Mendoza's final appeal was denied by the U.S. Supreme Court.

== Execution and aftermath ==
=== Death warrant and final appeals ===
Mendoza's death warrant was issued on December 11, 2024, scheduling his execution date as April 23, 2025. As of December 2024, Mendoza was one of the four condemned inmates from Texas to have their execution dates scheduled between February and April 2025. Out of the remaining three, Steven Lawayne Nelson and Richard Lee Tabler were executed on February 5 and February 13 respectively, while David Leonard Wood had his original execution date of March 13 postponed while pending an appeal.

After he was notified of his upcoming execution, Mendoza filed last-minute appeals to delay his execution. The Texas Court of Criminal Appeals rejected the appeal on April 15, 2025, eight days before he was to be executed.

On April 18, 2025, as a final attempt to stave off his execution, Mendoza appealed to the U.S. Supreme Court. On April 23, 2025, hours before the execution, the Supreme Court denied Mendoza's appeal. Simultaneously, Mendoza also petitioned for clemency to commute his death sentence to life imprisonment. However, the Texas Board of Pardons and Paroles rejected the clemency plea.

=== Lethal injection ===
On April 23, 2025, 41-year-old Moises Sandoval Mendoza was executed by lethal injection at the Huntsville Unit, thus becoming the third prisoner executed in Texas, as well as the 13th prisoner executed in the United States during the year of 2025.

In a final statement released after his execution, Mendoza apologised to the daughter and other relatives of Tolleson, stating that he was sorry for robbing them of a mother and loved one and he could not make up for his actions. Mendoza, who was pronounced dead 19 minutes after the drugs were first administered, also addressed his wife, his sister and two friends in Spanish, "I love you, I am with you, I am well and at peace."

=== Response ===
Prior to the execution of Mendoza, Tolleson's father Mark O'Neil expressed that he did not forgive Mendoza for his actions, but nonetheless showed sympathy towards his family, knowing that Mendoza's mother and sisters would lose a son and brother. Still, O'Neil stated that he lost a daughter to a brutal murder 21 years ago and he felt that Mendoza deserved to die many years ago and he showed no sympathy to his daughter's killer, pointing out that Mendoza disregarded Tolleson's plea for mercy and killed her but yet he sought to plead for his life.

Collin County District Attorney Greg Willis released a statement in response to the execution, stating that the murder of Tolleson "devastated her family and shocked our community", and while the pain and sadness caused to Tolleson's family could never be erased, he affirmed that justice was served to honour the life of the victim and he hoped for the family of Tolleson to find closure. Texas Attorney-general Ken Paxton expressed his support for the execution of Mendoza, stating that he would continue his efforts to "defend the law and hold criminals accountable".

=== Media ===
In the aftermath, the murder of Rachelle Tolleson was featured in the tenth season of Forensic Files in 2006, and again in Solved on Investigation Discovery in 2008.

== See also ==
- Capital punishment in Texas
- List of people executed in Texas, 2020–present
- List of people executed in the United States in 2025

Executions carried out in Texas
Preceded by Richard Lee Tabler February 13, 2025	Moises Mendoza; April 23, 2025	Succeeded by Matthew Johnson May 20, 2025
Executions carried out in the United States
Preceded by Mikal Mahdi – South Carolina April 11, 2025	Moises Mendoza – Texas; April 23, 2025	Succeeded by James Lee Osgood – Alabama April 24, 2025
