= Murder of Carmen Gayheart =

1994 abduction-killing of a nursing student in Florida, U.S.

Carmen Gayheart
- Born: Carmen Gabriella Tortora; September 2, 1970; Fort Lauderdale, Florida, U.S.
- Died: April 27, 1994 (aged 23); Hamilton County, Florida, U.S.
- Cause of death: Strangulation, Gunshot Wound
- Resting place: Forest Lawn Memorial Gardens Lake City, Florida, US
- Education: Lake City Community College
- Known for: Victim of a kidnapping, rape, and murder case

The murder of Carmen Gayheart occurred on April 27, 1994, when 23-year-old Carmen Gabriella Gayheart was abducted in Lake City, Florida, United States, and subsequently raped and murdered in Hamilton County, Florida. The perpetrators, Anthony Wainwright and Richard Hamilton, had escaped from a North Carolina prison just days prior to the crime. Gayheart was a mother of two and nursing student enrolled at Lake City Community College at the time of her death.

Following a multi-state investigation, both men were apprehended, tried, and convicted of first-degree murder. Both were sentenced to death. Hamilton remained on Florida's death row until his death from natural causes on January 13, 2023. Wainwright, the surviving co-defendant, was executed on June 10, 2025.

== Murder ==
On April 27, 1994, 23-year-old Carmen Gayheart, a nursing student and mother of two, was reported missing after she failed to pick up her children from daycare. Gayheart had been attending nursing classes at Lake City Community College in Lake City, Florida, and was last seen in a nearby parking lot earlier that day. When she did not arrive to collect her children as expected, her absence raised immediate concern. After an initial search by her husband, father, and classmates proved unsuccessful, she was officially reported missing. Unbeknownst to her family and investigators at the time, Carmen Gayheart had been abducted at gunpoint by Anthony Wainwright and Richard Hamilton while loading groceries into the Ford Bronco she was driving in the parking lot of a Winn-Dixie supermarket.

Just two days prior to kidnapping Gayheart, both Hamilton and Wainwright escaped from the Carteret Correctional Center, a minimum-security prison in Newport, North Carolina, where Wainwright was serving ten years in jail for burglary while Hamilton was serving 25 years for armed robbery. The pair additionally stole a vehicle and burglarized a home, where they took two rifles before they fled to Florida, where they eventually abducted and later killed Gayheart.

After abducting Carmen Gayheart, Anthony Wainwright and Richard Hamilton abandoned their original getaway vehicle at a lumber yard on U.S. 41 and fled the scene in Gayheart's Ford Bronco with her held hostage. The men drove her to a remote wooded area behind the Fuel City Truck Stop off State Route 6 in neighboring Hamilton County, Florida. There, in an isolated location far from public view, the two men subjected Gayheart to a brutal sexual assault. According to Hamilton, following the assault, Wainwright strangled her in an apparent attempt to kill her. To ensure her death, he then shot her twice in the head with a bolt-action .22 rifle, fatally wounding her. Her body was left at the scene, and the perpetrators continued their attempt to evade law enforcement. During the trial, both men confessed that the other man was to blame for strangling and shooting Gayheart.

The day after Gayheart's murder, on April 28, 1994, Wainwright and Hamilton were located near Brookhaven, Mississippi. When confronted by a Mississippi State Trooper, the two fugitives engaged in a gunfight with the trooper. The result ended in Hamilton being shot in the face and Wainwright sustaining a gunshot wound, both of which were non-fatal. During their arrest, authorities recovered Gayheart's Ford Bronco, which the suspects had been driving since fleeing the crime scene in Florida. Although the vehicle was found, there was still no sign of Gayheart at that time.

Following his arrest, Hamilton waived extradition and was promptly returned to Columbia County, Florida. There, investigators with the Columbia County Sheriff's Office conducted an in-depth interrogation regarding the disappearance of Carmen Gayheart. During the interview, Hamilton provided a detailed confession and cooperated with authorities by drawing a map of the remote site where Gayheart had been taken, raped, strangled, and ultimately shot. Though he had drawn the map, he could not identify the city or county where the area was located. Hamilton also claimed that while both he and Anthony Wainwright participated in the sexual assault, it was Wainwright who carried out the murder by shooting Gayheart.

On May 2, 1994, Tina Wheeler, a dispatcher with the Hamilton County Sheriff's Office, advised that she had recognized the map Hamilton drew as an area near State Route 6. Deputy Sheriff Mel Black and Albert Jones drove to the area at approximately 4:30 a.m. in an attempt to locate Gayheart's body. During the search, Jones noted a foul smell in the area and alerted investigators. At sunrise, approximately 7 a.m., the decomposed remains of Gayheart were discovered. The Hamilton County Sheriff's Office took the investigation into Gayheart's murder and sent the remains to the District 4 Medical Examiner's Office in Jacksonville. After Gayheart's body was transported to the medical examiner's office, investigators conducted a follow-up search of the crime scene. At the recommendation of Dr. Margarita Arruza, the medical examiner, who noted that Gayheart's remains were missing several teeth and the hyoid bone, investigators returned to the site. During the search, they successfully recovered some of her missing teeth and the hyoid bone.

== Trial proceedings ==
Anthony Floyd Wainwright
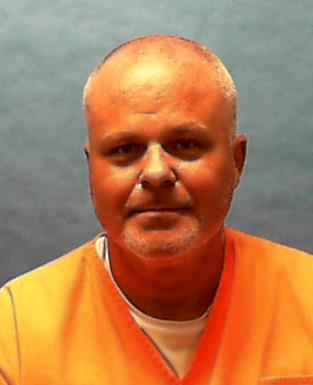
- Mug shot of Wainwright
- Born: October 22, 1970; Greenville, North Carolina, U.S.
- Died: June 10, 2025 (aged 54); Florida State Prison, Raiford, Florida, U.S.
- Cause of death: Execution by lethal injection
- Convictions: North Carolina; Larceny of a motor vehicle (2 counts); Breaking and entering and Larceny; Escape prison Felony breaking and entering (2 counts); Larceny (3 counts); Florida; First-degree murder Kidnapping; Robbery; Sexual battery
- Penalty: North Carolina; 15 years and 10 months (Breaking and entering); Florida; Death penalty, plus three consecutive life sentences

Details
- Victims: Carmen Gayheart, 23
- Date: April 27, 1994
- Country: United States
- State: Lake City, Florida
- Imprisoned at: Florida State Prison (death row)

Richard Eugene Hamilton
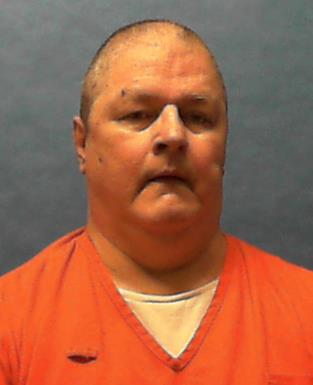
- Mug shot of Hamilton
- Born: February 16, 1963; Atlantic Beach, North Carolina, U.S.
- Died: January 13, 2023 (aged 59); Florida State Prison, Raiford, Florida, U.S.
- Cause of death: Unknown, presumed natural causes
- Status: Died on death row in 2023
- Convictions: North Carolina; Robbery with dangerous weapon Misdemeanor breaking and entering (3 counts); Felony breaking and entering (2 counts); Larceny; Misdemeanor assault (attempt to inflict serious injury) (2 counts); Forgery (2 counts); Florida; First-degree murder Kidnapping; Robbery; Sexual battery
- Penalty: North Carolina; 25 years (Robbery); Florida; Death penalty, plus three consecutive life sentences

Details
- Victims: Carmen Gayheart, 23
- Date: April 27, 1994
- Country: United States
- State: Lake City, Florida
- Imprisoned at: Union Correctional Institution (death row)

Following their arrests, Hamilton and Wainwright were charged with multiple felonies including first-degree murder, sexual battery, robbery, and kidnapping. In July 1994, a grand jury indicted the pair on all counts. The State Attorney for the Third Judicial Circuit, Jerry Blair, announced his intent to seek the death penalty against both men, citing the heinous and premeditated nature of the crimes, as well as the aggravating factors of kidnapping, sexual assault, and the victim's vulnerability. The case proceeded to trial amid significant public attention and outrage over the brutality of the offenses. The surviving family members of Gayheart expressed that they wanted both Wainwright and Hamilton to be executed for the rape and murder of Gayheart. Because of the significant media attention, as well as the court's inability to produce an unbiased jury in Hamilton County, the court decided to move the trial to Clay County, where a jury was quickly seated.

During their pre-trial detention at the Clay County Jail, Hamilton and Wainwright repeatedly expressed intent to escape custody. Authorities received intelligence indicating that the two men were actively planning an escape attempt, which allegedly included a plot to kill a correctional officer during the breakout. Due to the seriousness of these threats and the high risk they posed, jail officials placed both men in maximum-security confinement to prevent any potential escape or violence against staff. Not only that, for their court appearances, stun belts were installed on both Wainwright and Hamilton to constantly activate them to keep them under control.

The trial and sentencing of Wainwright and Hamilton were held before separate juries in May 1995, and on May 30, 1995, both juries found the two men guilty of kidnapping, raping and murdering Gayheart. On June 1, 1995, both juries recommended that Wainwright and Hamilton should be sentenced to death for the most serious charge of first-degree murder. Based on court sources, the jury in Wainwright's case handed a unanimous vote for capital punishment, while the jury in Hamilton's case issued a majority vote of 10–2.

On June 12, 1995, both Wainwright and Hamilton were sentenced to death via the electric chair by Circuit Judge Vernon Douglas. Apart from death sentences, the judge also imposed three consecutive life sentences to each man for the other offenses committed against Gayheart. The judge labeled the murder of Gayheart as "pitiless and unnecessarily torturous" and also "wicked, evil and vile."

== Appellate process ==
=== Hamilton ===
On October 23, 1997, Hamilton's direct appeal against his death sentence and murder conviction was dismissed by the Florida Supreme Court.

On June 3, 2004, Hamilton's second appeal was rejected by the Florida Supreme Court.

On March 3, 2017, the Florida Supreme Court rejected Hamilton's petition for writ of habeas corpus.

On February 8, 2018, the Florida Supreme Court denied Hamilton's post-conviction appeal and affirmed his death sentence.

=== Wainwright ===
On November 13, 1997, the Florida Supreme Court dismissed Wainwright's direct appeal.

On November 24, 2004, a second appeal from Wainwright was turned down by the Florida Supreme Court. Wainwright was one of four death row inmates (also including Loran Kenstley Cole) to lose their appeals to the Florida Supreme Court on the same day.

On November 13, 2007, Wainwright's appeal was rejected by the 11th U.S. Circuit Court of Appeals.

On November 26, 2008, Wainwright's third appeal to the Florida Supreme Court was denied.

In July 2023, the 11th U.S. Circuit Court of Appeals dismissed Wainwright's appeal, and also rejected Wainwright's submission of new DNA evidence on the basis that they were insufficient to rebut the findings of the trial DNA experts and demonstrate his alleged innocence.

On April 15, 2024, the U.S. Supreme Court dismissed Wainwright's final appeal against his death sentence.

== Hamilton's death ==
On January 13, 2023, Hamilton died at the age of 59 while incarcerated at Union Correctional Institution in Florida, after spending approximately 28 years on death row. The Florida Department of Corrections did not publicly disclose the cause of his death.

== Execution of Wainwright ==
On May 10, 2025, Florida governor Ron DeSantis signed a death warrant for Anthony Wainwright, scheduling his execution date as June 10, 2025.

Wainwright was scheduled to have an evidentiary hearing at the Hamilton County Courthouse in Jasper on May 19; however, Judge Melissa Olin declined to proceed with the hearing on May 16, citing lack of evidence to proceed with an evidentiary hearing. Following the ruling, Wainwright's attorneys filed an appeal to the Florida Supreme Court on May 20, with a motion for a stay of execution filed with the court on May 23. The court denied the request on June 3.

On June 6, Wainwright appealed to the U.S Supreme Court to halt his impending execution, citing prenatal exposure to Agent Orange, but the appeal was rejected.

Wainwright's execution was the sixth scheduled in Florida in 2025. On May 15, 2025, serial killer Glen Edward Rogers was executed by lethal injection, just five days after the approval of Wainwright's death warrant. Simultaneously, an Alabama death row inmate named Gregory Hunt, who was found guilty of the 1988 rape and murder of Karen Lane, was scheduled to be executed by nitrogen hypoxia on the same date as Wainwright. Wainwright was one of four inmates scheduled to be executed across four different states in the U.S. over a four-day period between June 10 and June 13, 2025.

On June 10, 2025, Wainwright was put to death by lethal injection in the Florida State Prison. The official time of death was 6:22 pm EDT. He made no final statement. His execution took place less than an hour earlier than Hunt, who was put to death by nitrogen hypoxia in Alabama and pronounced dead at 6:26 pm CDT.

It was later revealed following his execution that Wainwright was suffering from cancer. According to his autopsy report, Dr. Jon Thogmartin reported Wainwright had hepatic tumors with metastases to regional lymph nodes—adenocarcinoma with desmoplastic and necrotic features.

== Aftermath ==
In the aftermath of her murder, Carmen Gayheart's funeral was scheduled to be held on May 10, 1994. A trust fund was also set up for her two children.

In May 2014, about 20 years after the rape and murder of Gayheart, her sister expressed in an interview that she and her mother were still waiting for justice to be served and hoped to see both Hamilton and Wainwright executed for murdering her sister, whom she described as the "sweetest girl on the face of the earth". It was further revealed that Gayheart's father had since died in 2013, and Gayheart's sister even petitioned to the governor to sign death warrants for both Hamilton and Wainwright to ensure their executions be conducted sooner. Gayheart's mother also died in 2022 from cancer.

Mississippi Trooper John Wayne Leggett, the police officer who first spotted the two killers and engaged in a gunfight with them, recounted the case in 2018. Leggett stated that despite not initially realizing that the duo were fugitives, he nonetheless followed them after seeing them in an out-of-state vehicle and suspecting them, and his actions thus contributed to the arrests of both Wainwright and Hamilton. Leggett stated that this was the most unforgettable experience he had throughout the 27 years of his law enforcement career. It was further reported that for his role in apprehending the suspects, Leggett was honored as the statewide "Trooper of the Year" and received the Highway Patrol's Medal of Valor. He was also recognized by Congress and named a 1994 "Top Cop" by the National Association of Police Organizations. MHP trooper Leggett's story was also aired on the show "Real Stories of the Highway Patrol" and the story is also posted on youtube by trooper Leggett.

== See also ==
- Capital punishment in Florida
- List of people executed in Florida
- List of people executed in the United States in 2025

Executions carried out in Florida
Preceded by Glen Edward Rogers May 15, 2025	Anthony Wainright; June 10, 2025	Succeeded by Thomas Gudinas June 24, 2025
Executions carried out in the United States
Preceded by Oscar Franklin Smith – Tennessee May 22, 2025	Anthony Wainright – Florida; June 10, 2025	Succeeded by Gregory Hunt – Alabama June 10, 2025
