= List of people executed in the United States in 2025 =

Forty-seven people, all male, were executed in the United States in 2025, thirty-nine by lethal injection, five by nitrogen hypoxia, and three by firing squad. The number of executions in 2025 became the highest number to be carried out in the United States in 16 years.

The state of South Carolina carried out the executions of three inmates by firing squad, marking the first three executions by firing squad since 2010, when Ronnie Lee Gardner was executed in Utah by firing squad (all three inmates chose the method).

The state of Louisiana conducted its first execution in 15 years since 2010; the person executed, Jessie Hoffman Jr., was additionally the first to be executed by nitrogen gas in Louisiana, which became the second state after Alabama to conduct nitrogen gas executions. Arizona carried out the first executions in a state with a Democratic governor in office since 2017. The state of Mississippi carried out the execution of the state's longest-serving death row inmate Richard Gerald Jordan after he spent 49 years on death row. Edward Zakrzewski II was the ninth person put to death in Florida, marking a post-Furman record year of executions for the state since 2014; while the execution of serial killer Frank A. Walls (the 19th in Florida in 2025) marked the state's overall record for the number of executions in a single year in its history. Furthermore, Walls was also the nation's final execution in 2025.

Christopher Sepulvado and Ralph Menzies, who received March and September execution dates, respectively, died of natural causes at ages 81 and 67 before their executions could be carried out. Sepulvado was scheduled to be executed in Louisiana, and Menzies in Utah. Menzies, as well as David Lee Roberts in Alabama, received stays of execution to allow for competency evaluations. Robin Dion Myers and Tremane Wood received commutations of their death sentences to life without parole from Alabama governor Kay Ivey and Oklahoma governor Kevin Stitt respectively in 2025.

== List of people executed in the United States in 2025 ==
No.	Date of execution	Name	Age of person			Gender	Ethnicity	State	Method	Ref.
No.	Date of execution	Name	At execution	At offense	Age difference	Gender	Ethnicity	State	Method	Ref.
1	January 31, 2025	Marion Bowman Jr.	44	20	24	Male	Black	South Carolina	Lethal injection	
2	February 5, 2025	Steven Lawayne Nelson	37	24	13	Male	Black	Texas	Lethal injection	
3	February 6, 2025	Demetrius Terrence Frazier	52	19	33	Male	Black	Alabama	Nitrogen hypoxia	
4	February 13, 2025	James Dennis Ford	64	36	28	Male	White	Florida	Lethal injection	
5	February 13, 2025	Richard Lee Tabler	46	25	21	Male	White	Texas	Lethal injection	
6	March 7, 2025	Brad Keith Sigmon	67	43	24	Male	White	South Carolina	Firing squad	
7	March 18, 2025	Jessie Dean Hoffman Jr.	46	18	28	Male	Black	Louisiana	Nitrogen hypoxia	
8	March 19, 2025	Aaron Brian Gunches	53	31	22	Male	White	Arizona	Lethal injection	
9	March 20, 2025	Wendell Arden Grissom	56	37	19	Male	White	Oklahoma	Lethal injection	
10	March 20, 2025	Edward Thomas James	63	32	31	Male	White	Florida	Lethal injection	
11	April 8, 2025	Michael Anthony Tanzi	48	23	25	Male	White	Florida	Lethal injection	
12	April 11, 2025	Mikal Deen Mahdi	42	21	21	Male	Black	South Carolina	Firing squad	
13	April 23, 2025	Moises Sandoval Mendoza	41	20	21	Male	Hispanic	Texas	Lethal injection	
14	April 24, 2025	James Lee Osgood	55	41	14	Male	White	Alabama	Lethal injection	
15	May 1, 2025	Jeffrey Glenn Hutchinson	62	35	27	Male	White	Florida	Lethal injection	
16	May 15, 2025	Glen Edward Rogers	62	33	29	Male	White	Florida	Lethal injection	
17	May 20, 2025	Benjamin Donnie Ritchie	45	20	25	Male	White	Indiana	Lethal injection	
18	May 20, 2025	Matthew Lee Johnson	49	36	13	Male	Black	Texas	Lethal injection	
19	May 22, 2025	Oscar Franklin Smith	75	39	36	Male	White	Tennessee	Lethal injection	
20	June 10, 2025	Anthony Floyd Wainwright	54	23	31	Male	White	Florida	Lethal injection	
21	June 10, 2025	Gregory Hunt	65	28	37	Male	White	Alabama	Nitrogen hypoxia	
22	June 12, 2025	George John Hanson	61	35	26	Male	Black	Oklahoma	Lethal injection	
23	June 13, 2025	Stephen Christopher Stanko	57	37	20	Male	White	South Carolina	Lethal injection	
24	June 24, 2025	Thomas Lee Gudinas	51	20	31	Male	White	Florida	Lethal injection	
25	June 25, 2025	Richard Gerald Jordan	79	29	50	Male	White	Mississippi	Lethal injection	
26	July 15, 2025	Michael Bernard Bell	54	23	31	Male	Black	Florida	Lethal injection	
27	July 31, 2025	Edward James Zakrzewski II	60	29	31	Male	White	Florida	Lethal injection	
28	August 5, 2025	Byron Lewis Black	69	32	37	Male	Black	Tennessee	Lethal injection	
29	August 19, 2025	Kayle Barrington Bates	67	24	43	Male	Black	Florida	Lethal injection	
30	August 28, 2025	Curtis Lee Windom	59	26	33	Male	Black	Florida	Lethal injection	
31	September 17, 2025	David Joseph Pittman	63	28	35	Male	White	Florida	Lethal injection	
32	September 25, 2025	Geoffrey Todd West	50	21	29	Male	White	Alabama	Nitrogen hypoxia	
33	September 25, 2025	Blaine Keith Milam	35	18	17	Male	White	Texas	Lethal injection	
34	September 30, 2025	Victor Tony Jones	64	29	35	Male	Black	Florida	Lethal injection	
35	October 10, 2025	Roy Lee Ward	53	28	25	Male	White	Indiana	Lethal injection	
36	October 14, 2025	Samuel Lee Smithers	72	43	29	Male	White	Florida	Lethal injection	
37	October 14, 2025	Lance Collin Shockley	48	28	20	Male	White	Missouri	Lethal injection	
38	October 15, 2025	Charles Ray Crawford	59	26	33	Male	White	Mississippi	Lethal injection	
39	October 17, 2025	Richard Kenneth Djerf	55	23	32	Male	White	Arizona	Lethal injection	
40	October 23, 2025	Anthony Todd Boyd	54	21	33	Male	Black	Alabama	Nitrogen hypoxia	
41	October 28, 2025	Norman Mearle Grim Jr.	65	38	27	Male	White	Florida	Lethal injection	
42	November 13, 2025	Bryan Frederick Jennings	66	20	46	Male	White	Florida	Lethal injection	
43	November 14, 2025	Stephen Corey Bryant	44	23	21	Male	White	South Carolina	Firing squad	
44	November 20, 2025	Richard Barry Randolph	63	26	37	Male	Black	Florida	Lethal injection	
45	December 9, 2025	Mark Allen Geralds	58	21	37	Male	White	Florida	Lethal injection	
46	December 11, 2025	Harold Wayne Nichols	64	27	37	Male	White	Tennessee	Lethal injection	
47	December 18, 2025	Frank Athen Walls	58	19	39	Male	White	Florida	Lethal injection	
		Average:	56 years	28 years	28 years					

== Demographics ==
Gender
Male	47	100%
Female	0	0%
Ethnicity
White	32	68%
Black	14	30%
Hispanic	1	2%
State
Florida	19	40%
Alabama	5	11%
South Carolina	5	11%
Texas	5	11%
Tennessee	3	6%
Arizona	2	4%
Indiana	2	4%
Mississippi	2	4%
Oklahoma	2	4%
Louisiana	1	2%
Missouri	1	2%
Method
Lethal injection	39	83%
Nitrogen hypoxia	5	11%
Firing squad	3	6%
Month
January	1	2%
February	4	9%
March	5	11%
April	4	9%
May	5	11%
June	6	13%
July	2	4%
August	3	6%
September	4	9%
October	7	15%
November	3	6%
December	3	6%
Age
30–39	2	4%
40–49	10	21%
50–59	16	34%
60–69	16	34%
70–79	3	6%
Total	47	100%

== Executions in recent years ==
Number of executions
2026	39
2025	47
2024	25
Total	111

== See also ==
- List of death row inmates in the United States
- List of most recent executions by jurisdiction

Preceded by 2024	List of people executed in the United States in 2025	Succeeded by 2026
