= Richard Lee Tabler =

American spree killer (1979–2025)

- 2008 mugshot of Richard Tabler
- Born: February 5, 1979; Tulare County, California, U.S.
- Died: February 13, 2025 (aged 46); Huntsville Unit, Texas, U.S.
- Status: Executed by lethal injection
- Motive: Revenge (allegedly)
- Convictions: California; Second degree burglary; Assault on a police officer; Escape; Texas; Capital murder (×2); Possession of a prohibited item in a correctional facility
- Penalty: California; 3 years Texas; Death (×2)

Details
- Victims: 4
- Date: November 26–28, 2004
- Location: Killeen, Texas
- Imprisoned at: Allan B. Polunsky Unit (death row)

Richard Lee Tabler (February 5, 1979 – February 13, 2025) was an American spree killer who was responsible for four murders committed in 2004. On Thanksgiving Day of 2004, Tabler and a co-defendant shot and killed two men at a nightclub in Killeen, Texas. Two days later, Tabler also killed two teenage girls who worked as dancers at the same nightclub where he committed the Thanksgiving Day double murder. Tabler was charged for these four murders, and subsequently sentenced to death for two of them, while his accomplice was sentenced to life imprisonment. Tabler, who had since lost his appeals against the death sentence, was executed on February 13, 2025.

== Personal life ==
Richard Lee Tabler was born in Tulare County, California, on February 5, 1979, to Lorraine and Robert Tabler. According to court documents, Tabler did not have a happy childhood, as his parents were reportedly stuck in an extremely troubled marriage, which negatively impacted Tabler during his childhood. When Lorraine Tabler was pregnant with her son (reportedly an unplanned pregnancy), Robert Tabler tried to pressure Lorraine into an abortion, which was ultimately not done. Robert himself did not pay much attention to Tabler throughout his early years due to him working long hours, frequent travels, infidelity, and excessive drinking habits. Tabler's mother neglected him due to her work schedule and often left her son under the care of his older sister and older brother, and she was rarely home, and left for good when Tabler was merely ten. During his adolescence, he and his mother lived in both Florida and Nevada, but most of the time he lived with his father in California.

As a student, Tabler did poorly in school, had trouble paying attention, and had to repeat the third grade. Additionally, he was often lonely and had only one friend. At the age of 12, Tabler was diagnosed with attention deficit hyperactivity disorder (ADHD), and while his mother and sister noted that he was a good-natured person, he often had a quick temper. In his adulthood, Tabler was engaged with another woman, who had a daughter from her previous relationship before meeting Tabler, but the couple broke up sometime before Tabler was arrested for murder.

During his adulthood, Tabler was found guilty of second-degree burglary, as well as escape and assault of a police officer in California; Tabler was sentenced to three years in prison for these crimes. Apart from this, Tabler had a history of threatening law enforcement officers and fellow inmates. On one occasion in 2003, Tabler was caught for parole violation, and he reportedly escaped from a patrol car while handcuffed, and kicked the windows of another patrol car after he was again arrested and brought into custody, and later threatened his parole officer by claiming he would "take care" of him and his family.

== Murders ==
Within a span of two days, Tabler went on to commit four murders in Killeen, Texas between November 26 and November 28, 2004, and they consisted of two separate double murder cases.

=== Mohamed-Amine Rahmouni and Haitham Frank Zayed ===
On November 26, 2004, at a nightclub in Killeen, 25-year-old Richard Tabler and his accomplice, an 18-year-old Fort Hood soldier Timothy Doan Payne, shot and murdered a strip club manager and another male victim.

Prior to the double murder, Tabler used to work at the club, which was operated by 28-year-old Mohamed–Amine Rahmouni. Tabler and Rahmouni later had a conflict that led to Tabler losing his job, and allegedly, Rahmouni threatened to wipe out Tabler's family for $10, and as a result, on November 18, 2004, Tabler decided to kill Rahmouni and formulated a plan. In preparation for this act, Tabler bought a camcorder, a pickup truck and a 9–millimeter gun.

On November 26, 2004, Tabler contacted Rahmouni, offering to sell him some stereo equipment for $1,500 and arranged to meet up at the parking lot of a local business. After this, 25-year-old Haitham Frank Zayed, a friend of Rahmouni, drove Rahmouni to the meet-up point, and after the pair arrived at the location, Tabler, who was accompanied by Payne inside the pickup truck, shot Zayed and then Rahmouni, and Payne also videotaped some of the shootings. Tabler would later drag out the bodies of both Zayed and Rahmouni from their vehicle, and delivered a second shot to Rahmouni, who was still alive when he was brought out of the car.

After the murders, Tabler later stole a wallet and a black bag from the car, while Payne would keep the videotape and showed it to a friend before he destroyed it. Tabler had even bragged about the murders to a roommate. The night after he murdered Rahmouni and Zayed, Tabler called the Bell County Sheriff's Office and claimed responsibility for the double murder and proclaimed that he would commit another double murder.

=== Amanda Benefield and Tiffany Loraine Dotson ===
Two days later, on November 28, 2004, Tabler committed another double murder, and both his victims in this case were teenage girls. According to Tabler, he had a hit list of 11 employees from Rahmouni's bar whom he planned to kill. Based on the list itself, Tabler chose to target two teenage girls, 16-year-old Amanda Benefield and 18-year-old Tiffany Loraine Dotson, who both worked as dancers at the club. After he lured the girls out by promising them some drugs Tabler brought them to the lake, where he turned the gun on both girls and shot them multiple times resulting in their deaths. It was reported that Tabler believed the girls had implicated him in the murders of Rahmouni and Zayed. After murdering Benefield and Dotson, Tabler again called the Sheriff's Office to taunt them about the new killings, and stated that if the police did not close down the club, he would murder more people, specifically all the remaining employees of Rahmouni's club, and additionally threatened to come after the police if they did not close down the club.

The bodies of the girls were discovered by an employee of U.S. Army Corps of Engineers. While Dotson was immediately identified through first-hand investigations, Benefield's identity was not immediately established and it was only on December 4, 2004, when the police had a breakthrough and identified Benefield, who was allegedly a runaway girl from Louisiana.

== Murder charges and trial ==
Tabler was arrested for unrelated charges of felony theft on the same date he committed the murders of Tiffany Dotson and Amanda Benefield, and at this point in time, police investigators suspected that he was involved in the murders. Tabler confessed to the murders the next day while in police custody. After Tabler named Timothy Payne as an accomplice, Payne was arrested as well for his part in the murders of both Mohamed-Amine Rahmouni and Haitham Frank Zayed.

For the fatal shootings of Zayed and Rahmouni, both Tabler and Payne were charged with two counts of capital murder, an offence that carries the death penalty under Texas state law, on November 30, 2004. Additionally, Tabler was alone charged with capital murder for the deaths of Dotson and Benefield on December 10, 2004. Despite his confession, Tabler later retracted it and denied that he ever perpetrated the homicides.

On February 17, 2005, a Bell County grand jury indicted both Tabler and Payne for the Thanksgiving double murder, in addition to the Benefield-Dotson murders for solely Tabler. On February 26, 2005, both Payne and Tabler pleaded not guilty to their respective murder charges, and on May 21, 2005, the prosecution confirmed that they would seek the death penalty for Tabler. The defense filed a motion to have the death penalty taken off the table for Tabler on the grounds of diminished responsibility, but it was rejected by Judge Martha Trudo of the 264th District Court on January 26, 2007.

Originally, Tabler was supposed to stand trial in late 2006 for the murders of Zayed and Rahmouni, but it was postponed to 2007. Jury selection for the murder trial of Tabler began on February 12, 2007, and Tabler's trial took place on March 19, 2007, with opening arguments made on that date.

Tabler was found guilty of murdering Rahmouni and Zayed as charged by a jury on March 21, 2007, and his sentencing trial was slated to commence on March 26, 2007. The same jury returned with their verdict on April 2, 2007, sentencing Tabler to death for each count of capital murder over the Thanksgiving double deaths. Despite his conviction, Tabler's charges of killing Benefield and Dotson were still pending against him, although till this day, a trial has not been set for the Benefield-Dotson double murder.

As for Payne, he was separately tried in another court for the Rahmouni-Zayed murders, and his trial was conducted by jury on November 13, 2007, after it was initially pushed back from the original 2006 trial date. Payne was convicted of capital murder on both counts and sentenced to life imprisonment on November 15, 2007, after the prosecution decided to not pursue the death penalty for Payne. After losing his appeal against conviction and sentence, Payne is currently serving his life sentence at Memorial Unit, and he would be eligible for parole in 2044 after a minimum of 40 years behind bars.

== Death row ==
After his sentencing in 2007, Richard Tabler was incarcerated on death row at Allan B. Polunsky Unit, where the state's death row is located. At one point, Tabler was temporarily moved off death row and transferred to the Jester IV Unit after a suicide attempt in October 2008. After the end of trial proceedings, Tabler spent the following decade or so appealing against his two death sentences for the Thanksgiving double murder, and during this period, he committed more crimes while in prison.

Despite these developments, Tabler had more than once proclaimed his intention to waive his right to appeal and asked to be executed, although he would later change his mind and continue appealing. The first time he did so was on October 17, 2008, when Tabler asked to drop his appeals and wanted to die. The second time was on May 8, 2010, when he sent a letter to a judge to withdraw his appeal and called for his immediate execution, although his decision to stop appealing was questioned at one point and a hearing was held in 2011 to determine if he was mentally competent to forgo his appeals. On October 15, 2012, Tabler reiterated his death wish. In September 2013, Tabler again expressed his intention to not appeal, which was met with strong objections from his lawyers, who argued he was not in a mentally competent state to drop his appeals.

=== Appeal process ===
Tabler appealed against the trial verdict on December 16, 2009, but the Texas Court of Criminal Appeals dismissed his appeal.

Tabler was originally scheduled to be executed in February 2010, but a stay was issued. In August 2011, it was reported that Tabler had appealed that his first decision to waive his appeals were not made voluntarily as some prison officials allegedly threatened him to not proceed with his appeal against the death sentence.

On October 3, 2014, the 5th Circuit Court of Appeals rejected Tabler's appeal. A follow-up appeal from Tabler was also rejected by the 5th Circuit Court of Appeals on January 27, 2015, although some of Tabler's grounds of appeal were remitted back to the lower courts for re-hearing.

On June 10, 2021, the U.S. District Court for the Western District of Texas turned down the appeal of Tabler.

On October 19, 2023, Tabler's appeal was dismissed by the 5th Circuit Court of Appeals.

On October 7, 2024, the U.S. Supreme Court refused to allow Tabler's final appeal and therefore confirmed the death penalty in his case.

=== Phone smuggling crimes ===
In October 2008, it was reported that Tabler was caught for having made threatening phone calls to State Senator John Whitmire, claiming that he knew the names of the legislator's daughters and the residential address, and wanted to go after them.

After his arrest, Tabler was found to have used a smuggled mobile phone to make these calls, and it was further uncovered that Tabler had shared the same phone with nine other prisoners in his block, and about 2,800 calls were made on it during the past 30 days. A prison lockdown was therefore initiated for security reasons upon the revelation of the smuggled phone case.

After investigations found that Tabler's mother, Lorraine, had procured the phone and some air time for the phone calls, a warrant of arrest was issued. During that same month, Lorraine Tabler was arrested at an airport in Texas shortly after she arrived to visit her son, charged with smuggling prohibited items into the prison.

Tabler was charged with making threats and use of prohibited items in prison custody in May 2009, and therefore sentenced to ten years' imprisonment for these charges.

=== Death threat letters ===
Apart from the phone smuggling, Tabler had sent threat letters to Whitmire since 2008 and made death threats on the politician (one of these threat letters was also sent to a reporter). Another occasion in 2009, Tabler persuaded a Methodist prison chaplain to smuggle letters out of the prison, and these letters were sent out to Whitmire, which contained threats to the politician.

During that same year, he also made a web blog to once again threaten the life of Whitmire. In 2012, Tabler once again sent threat letters to Whitmire.

== Execution ==
In late 2024, a death warrant was signed for Tabler, who was scheduled to be executed on February 13, 2025. A December 2024 report revealed he was one of four condemned inmates from Texas to have their execution dates set between February and April 2025.

On the eve of his scheduled execution, Tabler released a statement through his wife, in which he expressed that he deeply regretted his crimes and was at peace with the impending execution. Tabler's 77-year-old mother, his older sister, and his wife (whom Tabler had married after they bonded through a prison letter program) all agreed that Tabler was no longer the person he was back then when he killed his victims. They stated that he looked out for the other prisoners and even raised a baby lizard in his cell.

During the final weeks leading up to his execution, Tabler chose to not appeal against his execution and accepted his death sentence, although his lawyers barely convinced him to petition for clemency from Texas Governor Greg Abbott. His counsel emphasised in the petition that Tabler had reformed and he was genuinely remorseful of his actions, and his redemption could continue to spread positive influence if he was spared and placed under a life sentence instead, and he was no longer a danger to society, but a "positive friend, family member and fellow inmate". He had devoted himself to religion and spent his time guiding the inmates in a ministry, writing books and drawing landscapes.

On February 13, 2025, 46-year-old Richard Lee Tabler was executed by lethal injection in the Huntsville Unit at 6:38pm. Tabler and another condemned prisoner from Florida, convicted double killer James Dennis Ford, were executed an hour apart from each other on the same date in Texas and Florida respectively. Tabler, whose execution was conducted later than Ford's, was the fifth condemned person executed in the U.S. in 2025.

In his final statement, Tabler expressed remorse for his crimes and thanked the prison officers for their support in his rehabilitation before execution, and also acknowledged the support of his family and counsel before his death.

== See also ==
- Capital punishment in Texas
- List of people executed in Texas, 2020–present
- List of people executed in the United States in 2025

Executions carried out in Texas
Preceded by Steven Lawayne Nelson; February 5, 2025	Richard Lee Tabler; February 13, 2025	Succeeded by Moises Mendoza; April 23, 2025
Executions carried out in the United States
Preceded by James Dennis Ford – Florida; February 13, 2025	Richard Lee Tabler – Texas; February 13, 2025	Succeeded by Brad Sigmon – South Carolina; March 7, 2025
