= Zakrzewski family murders =

1994 familicide case in Florida

- Family photo of Sylvia Zakrzewski, Edward Jon Zakrzewski III and Anna Zakrzewski
- Location: Mary Esther, Florida, U.S.
- Date: June 9, 1994
- Attack type: Murder; familicide
- Weapons: Crowbar and machete
- Deaths: Sylvia Zakrzewski, 34; Edward Jon "Kim" Zakrzewski III, 7; Anna Zakrzewski, 5
- Perpetrator: Edward James Zakrzewski II

The Zakrzewski family murders occurred in Mary Esther, Florida, United States, on June 9, 1994, when U.S. Air Force Technical Sergeant Edward James Zakrzewski II (January 31, 1965 – July 31, 2025), then 29 years old, killed his wife, son and daughter. When Zakrzewski's South Korean wife, Sylvia, sought a divorce, Zakrzewski attacked and battered her with a crowbar and machete and strangled her. Zakrzewski also killed his two children, Anna and Edward III, by fatally beating and stabbing them with a machete, with both children having defensive wounds found in the post-mortem examination.

Zakrzewski fled to Hawaii and went on the run for four months before he surrendered himself on October 15, 1994, a day after his case was publicized by American crime documentary series Unsolved Mysteries. Zakrzewski was found guilty of three counts of first degree murder, and sentenced to death on April 19, 1996 by Okaloosa County Circuit Court Judge G. Robert Barron. Zakrzewski was executed by lethal injection on July 31, 2025.

== Background and murders ==
Edward Zakrzewski
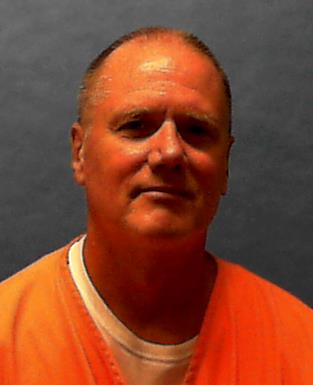
- Born: Edward James Zakrzewski II; January 31, 1965; Kalamazoo, Michigan, U. S.
- Died: July 31, 2025 (aged 60); Florida State Prison, Florida, U.S.
- Status: Execution by lethal injection
- Penalty: Death

Details
- Victims: 3
- Date: June 9, 1994
- Locations: Mary Esther, Florida
- Imprisoned at: Florida State Prison

Edward James Zakrzewski II, a Technical Sergeant of the U.S. Air Force who originally came from Kalamazoo, Michigan, first met his South Korean wife, Pun Im (Im Pun; Korean: 임분), in 1986 when he was stationed in Montana. After Im became pregnant, the couple married, and Im adopted the American name Sylvia. They went on to have two children together: Edward III (also known as Kim) and Anna. Subsequently, Zakrzewski was stationed in South Korea for three years between 1989 and 1992, and later transferred to the Eglin Air Force Base in Florida, and his family relocated to Mary Esther in Florida's Okaloosa County.

According to court documents, Sylvia faced discrimination while in South Korea for being married to an American and having mixed-race children. The couple's relationship became even more strained after the family moved back to the U.S.

Due to the numerous marital issues, Sylvia decided to divorce her husband, and to take custody of the two children and bring them back to South Korea with her, a matter that she deliberated for some time. On June 9, 1994, Kim informed his father by telephone about this plan while Zakrzewski was at work. Purportedly, the news greatly upset Zakrzewski, and during his lunch break he purchased a machete from a local store. When he arrived home that evening, he took the weapon, along with a crowbar and rope, and hid them in the bathroom.

Upon the arrival of his wife and children back home, Zakrzewski first attacked his wife. He struck her multiple times with the crowbar, then used the rope to strangle her. Afterwards, Zakrzewski targeted his children. First he called Kim into the bathroom to brush his teeth, then struck the seven-year-old boy repeatedly with the machete. Next, he summoned his five-year-old daughter, Anna, to brush her teeth and killed her in similar fashion.

Autopsy results showed that both the children had wounds on their arms and hands that were consistent with defensive wounds; Kim and Anna died from severe head, neck, and back injuries from the machete. Zakrzewski later dragged Sylvia's body into the bathroom, where he further mutilated her with the machete to ensure she was dead. Sylvia also died from both sharp-force and blunt-force injuries. Furthermore, the medical examiner, Dr. Edward Harvard, found that when Sylvia was strangled with the rope, she was still alive despite sustaining a fractured skull and at least eight machete blows to her back.

== Arrest and murder trial ==
=== Capture ===
After murdering his family, Zakrzewski drove to Orlando and flew to Hawaii, changed his name to Michael Green, and lived with the family of a minister who ran a religious commune; the minister allowed Zakrzewski to stay in a shack in return for performing maintenance work. Meanwhile, during his time on the run, the police discovered the murders and charged him in absentia after they named him a suspect in the case (as a result of Zakrzewski being listed as AWOL).

Four months later, the Zakrzewski family murders were publicized by American crime documentary series Unsolved Mysteries, with authorities seeking information of his whereabouts from the public. Reportedly, the minister recognized Zakrzewski as the alleged killer and commented to Zakrzewski that the killer resembled him. A day later, on October 15, 1994, Zakrzewski surrendered to police.

On October 25, 1994, Zakrzewski was extradited from Hawaii to Florida to face charges for killing his family. While pending trial, Zakrzewski and another inmate attempted to escape from the Okaloosa County Jail in August 1995, but the attempt failed after guards caught them trying to get through the fence.

=== Plea of guilt and sentencing ===
Conviction and submissions

On March 19, 1996, before he could officially claim trial, Zakrzewski pleaded guilty to all three counts of murdering his wife and two children.

A sentencing trial was subsequently conducted before an Okaloosa County jury, and the prosecution sought the maximum sentence of death for all three counts of first degree murder, citing that the murders were especially heinous, atrocious or cruel, while the defense sought life imprisonment on the basis that due to Zakrzewski's choice of weapons, the family died painlessly and quickly during the attack.

Sentencing verdict

On March 31, 1996, the jury recommended the death penalty twice for Zakrzewski on charges of killing his wife and son, while it settled on a life sentence for the murder of Zakrzewski's daughter. The vote for the death penalty was 7–5 in the deaths of both Kim and Sylvia, while it was 6–6 for Anna's death, which led to an automatic recommendation for life imprisonment.

In the final hearing before formal sentencing, Zakrzewski’s attorney Elton Killam urged the court to spare his client from the death penalty, arguing that Zakrzewski acted under extreme emotional and mental distress at the time of the killings. Killam claimed that Zakrzewski endured long-term psychological abuse by Sylvia, who had been unfaithful, engaged in gambling, and threatened to leave him and take their children to her native Korea. According to the defense, Zakrzewski’s thinking was deeply distorted, and he believed he was acting out of a misguided sense of mercy. Killam stated that Zakrzewski’s motive was to prevent his children from suffering, as he feared they would grow up in Korea as "half-breeds" who would not be accepted by society. He emphasized that Zakrzewski intended the deaths to be instantaneous and without pain. Calling the case “bizarre,” Killam acknowledged the difficulty of understanding how a father could commit such a crime but asked the judge to impose a life sentence instead of death.

In contrast, Assistant State Attorney Bobby Elmore strongly advocated for the death penalty in all three murders, characterizing the killings as deliberate, brutal, and emotionally devastating. Elmore argued that the murder of five-year-old Anna was particularly heinous because she was the last to die, and he contended she may have witnessed the aftermath of her brother’s death. Elmore rejected the defense’s portrayal of the killings as merciful, emphasizing the calculated and violent nature of the acts. He maintained that Zakrzewski’s actions warranted the harshest punishment available under the law—capital punishment.

Formal sentencing

On April 19, 1996, Zakrzewski was formally sentenced to death by Circuit Judge G. Robert Barron. Although Zakrzewski received two death sentences from the judge as the jury had decided, he was also handed a third death sentence for the murder of his daughter, after the judge overrode the jury's recommendation of life in prison.

In his sentencing remarks, Barron explained why he opted for a death sentence in Anna's murder, emphasizing that before her death, Zakrzewski forced his daughter to endure the unimaginable terror of knowing she was about to be killed by her own father and that her brother had already suffered the same fate. Summing up the gravity of the crime, Barron stated, "This court cannot imagine a more heinous or atrocious way of dying."

== Appellate proceedings ==
On June 12, 1998, the Florida Supreme Court dismissed Edward Zakrzewski's appeal and upheld all his three death sentences.

On January 25, 1999, Zakrzewski's appeal was denied by the U.S. Supreme Court.

On November 13, 2003, Zakrzewski's post-conviction appeal was rejected by the Florida Supreme Court.

The 11th Circuit Court of Appeals dismissed Zakrzewski's appeal on July 13, 2006.

A second appeal to the 11th Circuit Court of Appeals was rejected on July 9, 2009.

By January 2016, which was Zakrzewski's 20th year on death row, he was one of 141 condemned inmates in Florida who had exhausted all state and federal appeals against his conviction and sentence.

On May 25, 2017, the Florida Supreme Court rejected Zakrzewski's appeal for re-sentencing, which was filed after a legal reform decreed that death sentences could only be issued through unanimous jury verdicts in Florida. The majority opinion stated that the law change was not retroactive and given that the death sentences were finalized by the U.S. Supreme Court in 1999, Zakrzewski was not entitled to be resentenced under the newly-enacted death penalty law. Six years later, due to the public outrage towards school shooter Nikolas Cruz for avoiding the death penalty despite the murders of 17 teachers and students, the law requiring unanimity was abolished, and Florida Governor Ron DeSantis signing a new law to allow Florida's death sentences to be imposed under the majority agreement of at least eight jurors.

On September 20, 2018, the Florida Supreme Court dismissed another appeal from Zakrzewski.

== Execution ==
=== Death warrant ===
On July 1, 2025, Florida Governor Ron DeSantis signed a death warrant for Edward Zakrzewski, scheduling his execution to be carried out on July 31, 2025, at the Florida State Prison.

At the time, Zakrzewski was the ninth prisoner on Florida's death row scheduled for execution, and his execution date was slated 16 days after that of Michael Bell, who was sentenced to death for the murder of two people during a Jacksonville bar shooting in 1993 (Bell was also separately convicted of three other murders), and seven convicted killers were executed by the state of Florida between February and June 2025, marking the modern-era record for the number of executions approved by a Florida governor in one year (the highest number was eight under the governorships of Bob Graham and Rick Scott).

=== Final appeals ===
On July 22, 2025, the Florida Supreme Court denied Zakrzewski's appeal against his death sentences. On July 30, 2025, the U.S. Supreme Court denied Zakrzewki's final appeal for a stay of execution.

=== Lethal injection ===
After losing his final appeal, Zakrzewski was executed via lethal injection at 6:12 p.m. in Florida State Prison on July 31, 2025. He was the ninth person to be executed in Florida in 2025, which marked a record year for executions in Florida; the previous high was eight in 2014. For his last meal, Zakrzewski ordered fried pork chops, fried onions, potatoes, bacon, toast, root beer, ice cream, pie and coffee. He had one visitor, who was not identified, and did not take advantage of meeting with a spiritual advisor, according to Paul Walker, deputy communications director for the Florida Department of Investigations. In his final statement, Zakrzewski said, "I want to thank the good people of the Sunshine State for killing me in the most cold, calculated, clean, humane, efficient way possible. I have no complaint."

== Aftermath ==
The Zakrzewski family murders are known as some of the worst murders in Okaloosa County and Northwest Florida. Notably, just four years later in 1998, Gulf War veteran Jeffrey Hutchinson shot and killed his live-in girlfriend and her three children in the same county. Hutchinson was similarly sentenced to death and executed on May 1, 2025, for four counts of first degree murder.

The murders occurred two weeks prior to the O. J. Simpson murders, where Nicole Brown Simpson (Simpson's ex-wife) and Ronald Goldman were killed by Simpson, who was ultimately acquitted after an eight-month murder trial. However, the public attention towards the Simpson murders caused the Zakrzewski family murders, as well as other unrelated homicides that took place around the same time, to be overlooked by the public and media.

In October 2018, the Zakrzewski family murders were listed as one of the most heinous crimes committed in Northwest Florida. The same report revealed that of all the perpetrators behind these cases, 17 of them, including Zakrzewski, were sentenced to death by the state of Florida.

== See also ==
- Capital punishment in Florida
- List of people executed in Florida
- List of people executed in the United States in 2025

Executions carried out in Florida
Preceded by Michael Bell July 15, 2025	Edward Zakrzewski II; July 31, 2025	Succeeded by Kayle Bates August 19, 2025
Executions carried out in the United States
Preceded by Michael Bell – Florida July 15, 2025	Edward Zakrzewski II – Florida; July 31, 2025	Succeeded by Byron Lewis Black – Tennessee August 5, 2025
