= Eddie James =

Executed American convicted murderer and sex offender (1961–2025)

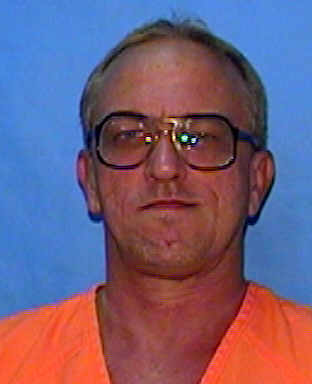
- Mug shot of James in 1993, after his arrest
- Born: Edward Thomas James; August 4, 1961; Bristol, Pennsylvania, U.S.
- Died: March 20, 2025 (aged 63); Florida State Prison, Raiford, Florida, U.S.
- Status: Executed by lethal injection
- Convictions: First-degree murder (x2); Aggravated child abuse; Attempted sexual battery; Sexual battery of a minor under the age of 12 (x2); Kidnapping; Grand theft; Grand theft auto
- Penalty: Death (x2); Life imprisonment (x3)

Details
- Victims: 2
- Date: September 20, 1993
- Country: United States
- State: Florida
- Weapons: Strangulation; Knife; Candlestick
- Date apprehended: October 6, 1993

Edward Thomas James (August 4, 1961 – March 20, 2025) was an American murderer and sex offender. His being featured on the national television show America's Most Wanted led to his capture and conviction for the September 1993 murders of an eight-year-old girl and her grandmother in Casselberry, Florida. He was convicted and sentenced to death in 1995. He sat on death row and awaited execution for nearly 30 years. He was executed by lethal injection on March 20, 2025.

== Background ==
Edward Thomas James was born in Bristol, Pennsylvania, on August 4, 1961. He believed his last name was Matlack until the age of 10, when he discovered that the man raising him was his stepfather. At age 11, James was introduced to drugs by his biological father, who was a drug counselor, after meeting and moving to live with him. In his mid-teens, James returned to live with his mother and moved to Casselberry in Seminole County, Florida. His life heavily revolved around drug addiction and violence, and he claimed to have drug-induced blackouts. His mother sought assistance from a mental health counselor; however, his violence and drug use continued.

James dropped out of high school in his junior year and joined the U.S. Army when he was 17. He was stationed in Germany, but was soon discharged for "failure to conform." James returned to Casselberry, where he became friends with a man named Tim Dick. James was welcomed into Dick's extended family, and, in the summer of 1993, he rented a room from Dick's mother, Betty.

== Murders ==
On September 20, 1993, James returned home from a party to find Elizabeth Ann "Betty" Dick's four grandchildren sleeping in the living room. He grabbed eight-year-old Toni Marie Neuner by the neck and strangled her into unconsciousness. He then took her to his bedroom and, believing she was already dead, raped her, after which he put her between his bed and the wall. She later died as a result of the strangulation.

James proceeded to Betty Dick's bedroom, where he hit her in the head with a candlestick and repeatedly stabbed her with a knife. Dick screamed, waking up Toni's sister, nine-year-old Wendi, who came to the bedroom. James tied Wendi up and put her in the bathroom. He then got a butcher knife from the kitchen, returned to the bedroom, and stabbed Betty in the back. After showering and taking jewelry from her bedroom, James fled in her car.

== Apprehension and sentencing ==
On September 28, 1993, America's Most Wanted (AMW) broadcast information related to the case, resulting in hundreds of viewer phone calls. Several tips indicated that he was traveling west. On October 5, 1993, the program broadcast an updated version with new information added from tips after the previous broadcast. The next day, a viewer spotted James at the California state unemployment office in Bakersfield and contacted authorities. Once in police custody, he gave two taped statements.

On April 5, 1995, James pleaded guilty to two counts of first-degree murder, and one count each of aggravated child abuse, attempted sexual battery, kidnapping, grand theft, and grand theft auto. He also pleaded no contest to two counts of capital sexual battery charged by separate information.

On August 18, 1995, James was sentenced to death for the murders of Toni Neuner and Betty Dick, as well as sentences ranging from 15 years to life on the other charges. He was incarcerated at Florida State Prison in Raiford, Florida.

== Execution ==
Following the execution of Jessie Hoffman Jr. on March 18, 2025, James was one of four inmates scheduled to be executed over a three-day period, from March 18 to 20, 2025. The other two were Aaron Gunches of Arizona (executed March 19, 2025), and Wendell Grissom of Oklahoma (executed March 20, 2025). James was executed on March 20 shortly after 8 p.m., with his execution taking place approximately nine hours after Grissom's execution; he was pronounced dead at 8:15 p.m. after receiving a three-drug lethal injection. There was a two-hour delay between when James's execution was scheduled to take place and when it was ultimately carried out, although Florida officials did not explain the reason for the delay. James did not make a final statement before his execution.

== See also ==
- Capital punishment in Florida
- List of people executed in Florida
- List of people executed in the United States in 2025

== Sources ==
- "Edward James, Petitioner, vs. State of Florida, Respondent" (PDF). Florida State University College of Law Library. Archived from the original (PDF) on September 14, 2006.
- Walsh, John; Lerman, Philip (1998). "The Demon Within". No Mercy: The Host of America's Most Wanted Hunts the Worst Criminals of Our Time—in Shattering True Crime Cases. Pocket Books. ISBN 978-0-671-01993-8.

Executions carried out in Florida
Preceded by James Dennis Ford February 13, 2025	Eddie James; March 20, 2025	Succeeded by Michael Tanzi April 8, 2025
Executions carried out in the United States
Preceded by Wendell Grissom – Oklahoma March 20, 2025	Eddie James – Florida; March 20, 2025	Succeeded by Michael Tanzi – Florida April 8, 2025
