= Murders of Greg and Kimberly Malnory =

1997 double murder of a married couple in a Florida fish farm

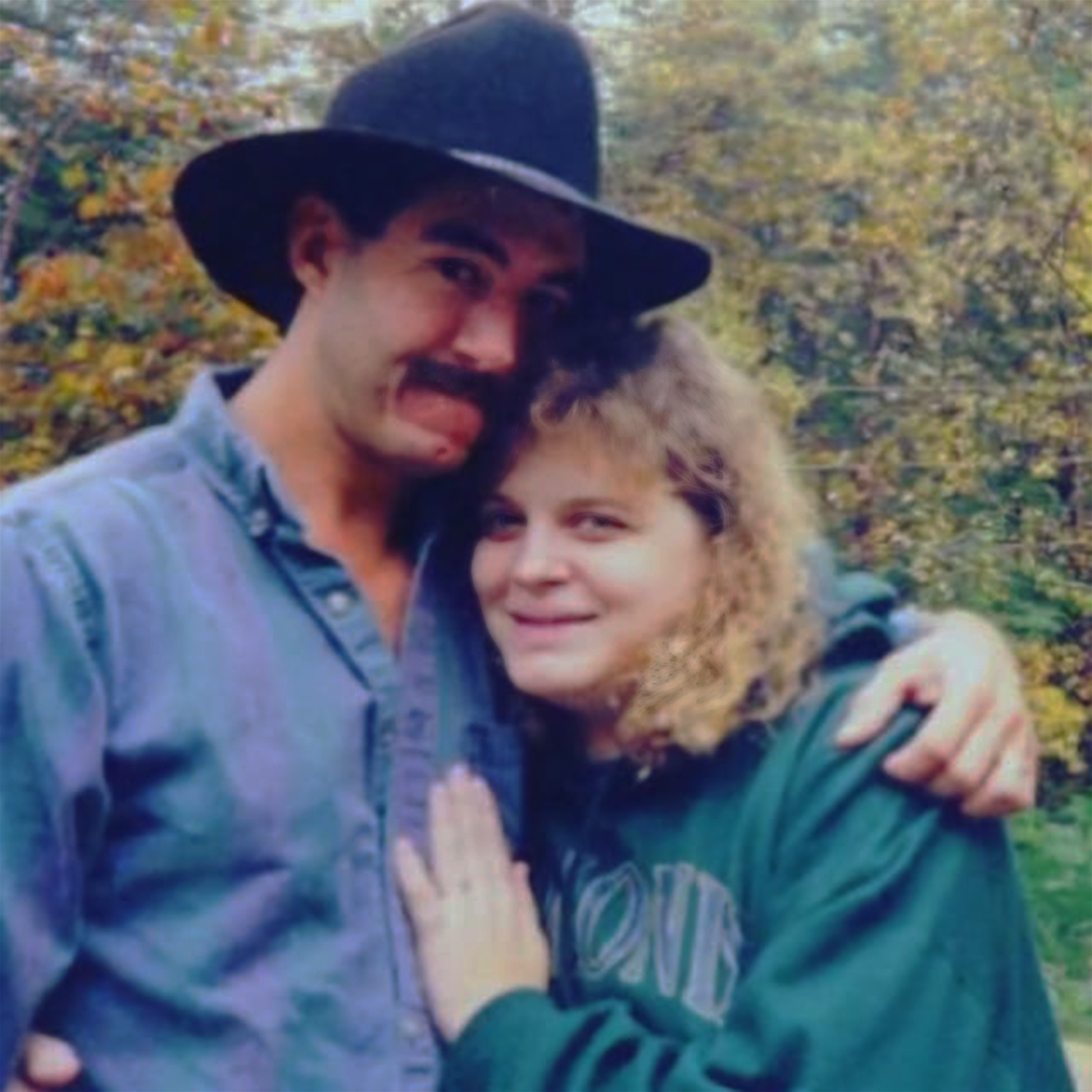
- Greg and Kimberly Malnory
- Location: Charlotte County, Florida, U.S.
- Date: April 6, 1997
- Attack type: Bludgeoning, shooting, rape
- Victims: Greg Malnory; Kimberly Malnory
- Perpetrator: James Dennis Ford
- Charges: Murder, sexual battery, child abuse

On April 6, 1997, 25-year-old Gregory Philip Malnory (July 18, 1971 – April 6, 1997) and 26-year-old Kimberly Ann Malnory (née Parkinson; November 9, 1970 – April 6, 1997) were murdered by 36-year-old James Dennis Ford at South Florida Sod Farm in Charlotte County, Florida, after Ford lured the married couple to the farm under the pretense of a fishing trip. Ford both bludgeoned and shot the Malnorys, raping Kimberly before he killed her, and abandoned their 22-month-old daughter Maranda alone in their pickup truck. Ford was found guilty of the double murder and sentenced to death in 1999. After over 25 years on death row, Ford was executed by lethal injection at Florida State Prison on February 13, 2025.

== Double murder ==
On April 6, 1997, a married couple were attacked and murdered during their fishing trip by a known acquaintance at a fish farm in Charlotte County, Florida.

On that day, Gregory Philip Malnory Jr. and his wife Kimberly Ann Malnory were invited to the South Florida Sod Farm by Greg's co-worker James Dennis Ford, who arranged for a fishing trip with the couple at the farm. The Malnorys and their 22-month-old daughter Maranda arrived at the farm in their family truck.

After the couple arrived that afternoon, Ford attacked them with a rifle. He first attacked Greg, shooting him in the head before he bludgeoned him in the head with a presumed blunt weapon and slitting his throat. Kimberly, who was injured at that time, escaped and managed to save her daughter by strapping her to the backseat of the truck. However, Ford caught up to Kimberly and attacked her, raping her before he violently battered her and executed her with the rifle.

The following day, on April 7, 1997, a farm worker found the Malnorys' bodies; their daughter Maranda, trapped for more than 18 hours inside the truck, was alive but dehydrated, suffering from insect bites, and had traces of her mother's blood on her body. Maranda was taken to St. Joseph's Hospital in Port Charlotte.

An autopsy report showed that at least seven blunt force injuries were inflicted to Greg's head and face, most likely by an axe, and the throat was slit nearly from ear to ear. The medical examiner certified that Greg was disabled by the bullet in his head, and the wounds caused by bludgeoning and the slit wound resulted in Greg's death. Kimberly sustained nine blunt force injuries to her head, one of which fractured and penetrated her skull, and Ford's semen was found in her vaginal area, which proved that Ford raped her before killing her by bludgeoning and shooting.

== Arrest and criminal charges ==
Ford was not arrested until April 17, 1997, when he was determined to be the last person who saw the Malnorys alive, and the investigations implicated him in the murders. Ford initially claimed that he last saw the couple alive after he left them and their daughter to go hunting alone, and also added that when he returned to his truck, he never saw whether the couple were alive or dead and how they died. However, Ford's statements contained multiple inconsistencies and witnesses attested that Ford was last together with the couple before their deaths and the discovery of their corpses.

Ford was thus detained in police custody and on April 18, 1997, he was charged with two counts of first-degree murder, an offense which carries the death penalty under Florida state law. A Charlotte County grand jury formally indicted Ford on April 30, 1997, for varied charges of first-degree felony murder, first-degree premeditated murder, robbery with a firearm, sexual battery and child abuse. The prosecution also expressed their intent to seek the death penalty for Ford in May 1997.

== Trial of James Dennis Ford ==
=== Ford's background ===
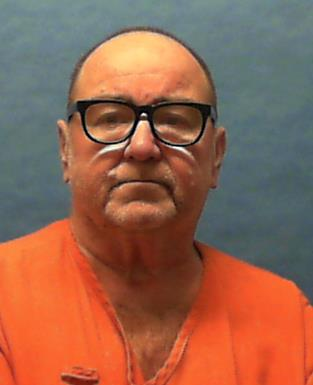
Ford

Born on July 23, 1960, James Dennis Ford had a troubled childhood; according to media and court sources, his father was an alcoholic, while his mother left when he was 14. Nevertheless, Ford and his father shared a close bond and, after dropping out of school, Ford went to work with his father as a cemetery caretaker.

Ford's father died at 52-53 years of age when Ford was in his early 20s, and according to his friends and first wife, Ford was way so devastated by his father's death that it marked the start of his alcoholism; while he had begun drinking in his late teens, following his father's death he consumed as much as 24 cans of beer every day. Ford's alcoholism was noted as a likely factor that led to him committing the double murder. Still, in his early life, Ford had no significant criminal record and he was noted to be a non-violent man, per the testimony of his family and friends.

=== Conviction and death penalty ===
Ford's murder trial was initially slated to begin on January 25, 1999, after the judge refused the defense's request to gag trial witnesses. The trial opening date was pushed back to February 1, 1999, after a hearing in which the judge ruled that Ford was mentally competent to proceed with his trial for the double murder, and jury selection commenced during that same month.

During the trial, the prosecution submitted various items of evidence to prove that Ford was guilty of murder, most notably the forensic evidence, including the fact that the DNA profile of the semen traces on Kimberly's body matched to that of Ford. Ford's pocket knife seized from his home was found to contain traces of Greg's DNA and the parts of a rifle recovered at the murder site were certified to have come from Ford's rifle. The defense, however, sought to dispute the credibility of DNA evidence used against Ford and claimed that the samples were contaminated and the accuracy of the results should be put in question. The defense also asked the jury to acquit Ford of the murders since there was no reason or motive for Ford to kill the couple.

On March 8, 1999, the jury found Ford guilty of sexual battery with a firearm, child abuse, and two counts of first-degree murder. The charge of child abuse was related to Ford abandoning the Malnorys' daughter inside their truck after murdering her parents, and the sexual battery charge was related to the rape of Kimberly. The sentencing trial of Ford was slated to begin in April 1999.

The prosecution sought the death penalty for Ford on the grounds that Ford made the conscious choice to brutally murder the couple, rape Kimberly, and abandon a baby girl alone near the site of her parents' deaths. The defense, meanwhile, urged the jury to show mercy to Ford, arguing that suffered from diminished responsibility caused by alcohol and drug intoxication. On April 23, 1999, by a majority vote of 11–1, the jury recommended the death penalty for the charges of murder. The families of the Malnorys were allowed to give victim impact statements to the court before the sentencing of Ford.

On June 3, 1999, Ford was sentenced to death for the double murder by Circuit Judge Cynthia Ellis during a formal sentencing trial. He was also sentenced to five years in prison for child abuse and given a concurrent sentence of more than 19 years' imprisonment (with a three-year mandatory minimum term) for the sexual battery charge.

== Ford's appeals ==
On September 13, 2001, the Florida Supreme Court dismissed Ford's direct appeal against his conviction and sentence.

On April 12, 2007, the Florida Supreme Court once again rejected Ford's second appeal, in which he alleged that he was represented by ineffective legal counsel and asked to have his two death sentences and double murder conviction overturned.

On October 27, 2009, the 11th Circuit Court of Appeals rejected Ford's appeal.

On March 14, 2012, the U.S. Supreme Court rejected Ford's appeal, thus ending all regular avenues of appeal.

On April 15, 2015, Ford's third appeal to the Florida Supreme Court was also dismissed. On January 23, 2018, Ford's fourth appeal for post-conviction relief was turned down by the Florida Supreme Court.

== Execution ==
On January 10, 2025, Florida State Governor Ron DeSantis signed Ford's death warrant, directing that his death sentence be carried out on February 13, 2025, at the Florida State Prison, where he had been incarcerated on death row since 1999.

Ford filed a last series of appeals to stave off his execution. That same month, the Charlotte County judge rejected Ford's appeal, after he dismissed the argument that Ford had the mental and developmental age of a 14-year-old. On February 7, 2025, the Florida Supreme Court dismissed the follow-up appeal of Ford and upheld the lower court's ruling.

A day after the Florida Supreme Court dismissed Ford's appeal, Ford's lawyers appealed further to the U.S. Supreme Court and urged the court to invalidate Ford's death sentence on the grounds that it would be unconstitutional to execute offenders who had a mental and developmental age below 18, referring to a 2005 landmark ruling Roper v. Simmons, which barred the executions of defendants who were under age 18 at the time of their crimes. Ultimately, on February 12, 2025, the eve of Ford's scheduled execution, the U.S. Supreme Court dismissed Ford's appeal and allowed the execution to move forward as scheduled.

On February 13, 2025, 64-year-old Ford was put to death by lethal injection at 6:19 pm in Florida State Prison. Ford and another condemned prisoner from Texas, spree killer Richard Lee Tabler, were executed an hour apart from each other on the same date in Florida and Texas respectively. Ford was the first condemned person put to death in Florida in 2025, and the fourth execution conducted in the United States that same year.

Before his execution commenced, Ford received final visits from three of his family members. For his final meal, Ford requested a steak, macaroni and cheese, fried okra, sweet potato, pumpkin pie and sweet tea. He declined to make a final statement.

Deidre Parkinson, Kimberly's stepmother, stated that she was relieved and felt that justice was served even though she found Ford's manner of death too peaceful. Connie Ankney, Greg's mother, also attended the execution. She described it as a day of justice to see Ford executed, and stated, "I hope he burns in hell." The Malnorys' daughter released a statement, saying that despite not wishing for this on her parents' killer, she had a peace of mind and stated that the emotional and mental impacts of losing her parents made her stronger.

== Aftermath ==
The Malnorys' family members, friends, and colleagues of the couple were shocked and saddened by the incident. Greg's supervisor described him as a model employee. A childhood friend described Kimberly as a well-loved student in the Charlotte High School community.

Soon after the double murder happened in April 1997, a community trust fund was set up for the couple's surviving daughter Maranda. In May 1997, a local restaurant in Punta Gorda, Florida, held a special dinner event to raise funds for the Malnorys' daughter. A vigil was held to commemorate the victims of violent crimes that took place during that year in May 1997, including the double murder at the South Florida Sod Farm.

In 2000, when Florida lawmakers proposed a bill on capital punishment, about the reform of appellate processes to shorten the length of stay on death row, Greg's mother, Connie Jo Ankney, spoke up to support the bill, given that she did not wish to see Ford spend more than 20 years on death row (the average stay was around 14 years) and hoped to see his death sentence carried out as soon as possible.

In 2002, Charlie Ankney (Greg's stepfather) and Linda Griffin (Kimberly's mother) took part in protests for the state of Florida to continue the use of capital punishment for serious crimes, stating in response to the prior protests of death penalty opponents that Ford deserved the death penalty for the double murder of the Malnorys.

During the next few years, the graves of the Malnorys and Kimberly's younger sister Jennifer Kay Griffin (who died in a car accident in 1999) were repeatedly a target for vandalism and theft. Between December 1997 and October 2003, the gifts left at the couple's graves were being stolen by unknown people. In October 2003, the graves were vandalized with beheaded angel statues and broken decorative items around them. The perpetrator, Dean Kenneth Healy, was identified and arrested for charges of vandalizing the graves and cemetery, and sentenced to eight months imprisonment in October 2004.

On May 6, 2016, Kimberly's mother, Linda Griffin, died in a car accident. Connie Ankney also became a victim advocate for the Southwest Florida Chapter of the Parents of Murdered Children, a non-profit organization that provides grief support and other forms of aid to family members of homicide victims. Ankney also stated in a 2019 news report that her involvement in the group helped her to cope with her sadness of losing her son and daughter-in-law.

In an interview ahead of Ford's execution, Maranda expressed that she had little recollection of the crime, and she only learned of the full facts at age 13. Nonetheless, she still grieved for her parents and still questioned why they ended up that way back in 1997.

== See also ==
- Capital punishment in Florida
- List of people executed in Florida
- List of people executed in the United States in 2025
- List of solved missing person cases: 1950–1999

Executions carried out in Florida
Preceded by Loran Cole August 29, 2024	James Dennis Ford; February 13, 2025	Succeeded by Eddie James March 20, 2025
Executions carried out in the United States
Preceded by Demetrius Terrence Frazier – Alabama February 6, 2025	James Dennis Ford – Florida; February 13, 2025	Succeeded by Richard Lee Tabler – Texas February 13, 2025
