= Duckett =

Duckett is a surname. Notable people with the surname include:

- Allen Bowie Duckett (1775–1809), American judge in the District of Columbia
- Ben Duckett (born 1994), English cricketer
- Bilal Duckett (Kevin Bilal Duckett, born 1989), American soccer player
- Catherine N. Duckett (born 1961), American entomologist
- Carl E. Duckett (1923–1992), American army officer, later CIA technical director
- Damane Duckett (born 1981), American football player
- Dick Duckett (Richard J. Duckett, 1933–2021), American basketball player
- Donald Duckett (1894–1970), English footballer, nephew of Horace
- Eleanor Duckett (1880–1976), British-American philologist and medieval historian, professor at Smith College
- George Duckett (Calne MP) (1632–1732), British lawyer, MP for Calne
- Sir George Duckett, 1st Baronet (1725–1822), born George Jackson, British politician
- Sir George Duckett, 2nd Baronet (1777–1856), British landowner and politician, son of the above
- Sir George Floyd Duckett, 3rd Baronet (1811–1902), English soldier and antiquarian, son of the above
- Horace Duckett (1867–1939), English international rugby union and rugby league player
- J. Fred Duckett (1933–2007), Texan sports announcer and teacher
- Jane Duckett, British political scientist
- John Duckett (1613–1644), English Catholic priest and martyr
- John Duckett (Royalist) (1580–1684), English landowner, MP for Calne
- James Duckett (died 1601), English Catholic martyr
- James W. Duckett (1911–1991), United States Army officer, chemistry professor and President of The Citadel military college
- James Aren Duckett (born 1957), American convicted murderer
- Kevin Duckett, Australian rugby league player
- LaFayette Duckett (1918–2018), American politician from Texas
- Lionel Duckett (1511–1587), British merchant, Lord Mayor of London
- Lionel Duckett (died 1609) (c.1577–1609), MP for Calne 1601–1604
- Lionel Duckett (died 1693) (1652–1693), MP for Calne 1679 and 1689
- Mahlon Duckett (1922–2015), American Negro league baseball infielder
- Melinda Duckett (1985–2006), mother of missing child Trenton Duckett
- Richard Duckett (disambiguation), several people
- Rick Duckett (born 1957), American basketball coach
- Stephen Duckett (born 1950), Australian economist and health services manager, former president and chief executive officer of Alberta Health Services
- Stephen Duckett (MP) (c.1548–1591), MP for Calne 1584–1588
- T. J. Duckett (born 1981), American football player
- Thasunda Duckett (born 1973), American business executive
- Thomas Duckett (American politician)
- Thomas Duckett (MP) (1713–1766), MP for Calne 1754 and 1761
- Thomas Duckett Senior and Thomas Duckett Junior, English sculptors
- William Duckett (disambiguation), several people

Fictional characters

- Nurse Duckett, in the novel Catch-22
