= Murder of Jeffrey Young =

1987 murder of a state highway trooper in Manatee County, Florida

- Jeffrey Dale Young
- Location: Manatee County, Florida, United States
- Date: August 18, 1987; 39 years ago
- Attack type: Murder by shooting
- Deaths: Jeffrey Dale Young, 28
- Motive: To avoid arrest for cocaine trafficking
- Verdict: Guilty
- Convictions: First-degree murder
- Sentence: Death (June 2, 1988)
- Convicted: Daniel Burns Jr., 42

On August 18, 1987, in Manatee County, Florida, Florida Highway Patrol Trooper Jeffrey Dale Young was fatally shot during a traffic stop involving Daniel Burns Jr. (born January 29, 1945) and Samuel Williams. During a search of the vehicle, Trooper Young discovered cocaine, leading to a struggle between him and Burns before the trooper was shot. Both Burns and Williams were arrested and charged with the murder. However, Williams was granted immunity after agreeing to testify for the prosecution against Burns, who was subsequently convicted of first-degree murder and sentenced to death on June 2, 1988. Burns, whose death sentence was overturned once before it was reinstated on July 6, 1994, remains on death row as of 2026.

== Murder ==
On August 18, 1987, a Florida Highway Patrol police trooper was shot and killed during a traffic stop in Manatee County, Florida.

On that day, two men, Daniel Burns Jr. and Samuel Williams, who were both from Detroit, Michigan, were driving en route to Florida when they were pulled over by 28-year-old Trooper Jeffrey Dale Young at a road. After Trooper Young asked for their identification, the pair consented to the trooper's request to search their car, and during the search, Trooper Young found a bag containing cocaine inside the trunk of the car.

After this, a struggle ensued between the trooper and one of the men, Daniel Burns, who tried to reach for Trooper Young's revolver. After overpowering the trooper, Burns took the revolver and shot Trooper Young to death. According to a medical examiner, the bullet had first struck the trooper's wedding ring and grazed his finger before it went upwards and hit his upper lip, and entered his head, resulting in Trooper Young's death.

The shooting was witnessed by several passers-by, who gave varying testimonies of the crime. In one version, Trooper Young purportedly asked the bystanders (who tried to help him) to stay away due to Burns gaining possession of his gun, and in another version, Trooper Young asked for help, prompting a witness to try to help the trooper by fruitlessly reaching for the shotgun in the police car, before he used the police radio to relay Trooper Young's situation with hopes of seeking help. Trooper Ray Hicks was the first to hear the radio message, but by the time he arrived at the crime scene, Trooper Young was already dead and the two men had escaped the area.

Before his death, Trooper Young had served with the Florida Highway Patrol for three years. He was the 15th member of the department to be killed in the line of duty since 1939. At the time of his death, Trooper Young was married with one daughter.

On August 22, 1987, four days after the murder, multiple police officers from several states like Florida, Georgia, South Carolina and Connecticut attended the funeral of Trooper Young, where a total of more than 1,500 people came to pay respects. Then Governor Bob Martinez also submitted a eulogy for the fallen officer.

== Charges ==
On the night of August 18, 1987, the same day he killed Trooper Jeffrey Young, Daniel Burns became the first suspect to be arrested hours after the murder. A day later, the other suspect, Samuel Williams, was arrested in Hillsborough County, Florida, and taken back to Manatee County to face investigations for the killing.

After the duo's arrest, they were charged with first-degree murder by the local authorities and detained at the Manatee County Jail.

On August 24, 1987, Burns was formally indicted by a Manatee County grand jury for the first-degree murder of Trooper Young. State Attorney Frank Schaub confirmed that he would seek the death penalty for Burns in his upcoming murder trial.

On August 27, 1987, Samuel Williams, the other suspect arrested for the murder, was granted immunity by the prosecution after he agreed to turn state evidence against Burns. Two months later, Williams was scheduled to give his testimony on October 28, 1987, and was set to be released on a later date once he completed his testimony against Burns.

== Trial of Daniel Burns Jr. ==
=== Personal life ===
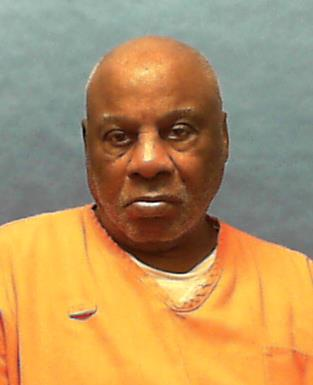
2026 mugshot of Burns

Daniel Burns Jr. was born on January 29, 1945, in Mississippi. Burns's parents were sharecroppers working on a plantation owner's land in Mississippi during the 1950s and 1960s, and during this period, the family lived in great poverty, and in order to support their livelihood, Burns and his 16 other siblings had to pick cotton, haul wood and hoe vegetables.

Subsequently, Burns left Mississippi and went north to seek a better life, first relocating to Toledo, Ohio, before he relocated to Detroit, Michigan. At one point, Burns had a relationship with a woman, with whom he had two children. According to his family and friends, Burns was said to be a responsible and hardworking family man who supported his family financially and morally, and when one of Burns's sisters died, leaving behind her three daughters, he provided clothes and money to help support his nieces in Detroit.

=== Trial and verdict ===
On May 3, 1988, Daniel Burns Jr. was officially put on trial before a Manatee County jury for murdering Trooper Jeffrey Young. At the start of the trial, the judge overruled the defence and allowed the prosecution to present the videotaped interrogation of Burns in court.

On May 12, 1988, Burns was found guilty of first-degree murder for shooting Trooper Young to death.

On May 13, 1988, a day after Burns's conviction, the jury recommended via a majority vote of 10–2 to sentence Burns to death.

On June 2, 1988, Burns was formally sentenced to death via the electric chair by Circuit Judge Stephen Dakan for the murder of Trooper Jeffrey Young. Burns also received a sentence of 30 years' imprisonment for the other charge of cocaine trafficking.

During sentencing, Burns told the court that he felt sorry that Trooper Young was killed, and he added that he prayed to God every night since the murder for help. Trooper Young's family were also present in the courtroom to attend the hearing, and they all agreed with the death sentence. Apart from the victim's family, many law enforcement officers also attended the court session to hear the verdict.

== Appeals ==
=== First appeal and re-sentencing ===
On May 16, 1991, the Florida Supreme Court upheld his murder conviction, but overturned his death sentence and ordered a re-sentencing trial. However, in February 1992, the court agreed to revisit the case.

On December 24, 1992, after reviewing Burns's case, the Florida Supreme Court decided to vacate his death sentence and ordered a re-sentencing trial, on the grounds that the aggravating factors were erroneously presented in justifying the death sentence and describing the murder of Trooper Young as "especially heinous, atrocious or cruel".

A re-sentencing trial was scheduled to take place in Manatee County in early 1994, after the judge denied the defence's motion to change the trial venue from Manatee County to another county.

The hearing proceeded in March 1994. The defence lawyer Adam Tebrugge argued against the state's decision to seek the death penalty, stating that the decision was racially-charged because Burns was an African-American man charged with the murder of Trooper Young, who was a white police officer, and pointed out that ever since the start of State Attorney Earl Moreland's term, he had sought the death penalty for seven cases where the defendant was black and the victim was white, but since 1988, the Manatee County State Attorney's Office did not pursue the death penalty for a single case where the victim was black. Furthermore, Tebrugge pointed out that in line with a 1987 U.S. Supreme Court ruling, Burns's lack of criminal records as a mitigating factor should be sufficient to outweigh the single aggravating factor proven by the prosecution, and thus it should help him avoid the death sentence. In rebuttal, State Attorney Moreland pointed that there were not one, but three aggravating factors: the murder of Trooper Young was committed by Burns with the purpose of avoiding arrest, the victim was a law enforcement officer carrying out a valid arrest, and the murder prevented the victim from fulfilling his government duties.

Apart from the submissions from both sides, the family of Burns came to court to testify on his behalf. Final arguments were set to be made on April 12, 1994, with the jury taking a break before they hear them and decide on the sentence.

On April 19, 1994, the jury unanimously voted for the death penalty for Burns. Three months later, Burns was formally sentenced to death by Circuit Judge Paul Logan on July 6, 1994.

=== Subsequent appeals ===
On July 10, 1997, the Florida Supreme Court upheld the death sentence of Burns and dismissed his appeal.

On February 23, 1998, the U.S. Supreme Court denied Burns's appeal.

On June 8, 1998, Burns filed another appeal seeking a new trial. A hearing was scheduled on July 8, 1999.

In March 2000, Burns appealed to the Manatee County Circuit Court to review his death sentence, claiming that he was illegally stopped by Trooper Young before the shooting on the basis that he was African-American and fit the racial profile of a drug trafficker while the trooper was white.

On February 5, 2002, the defence counsel of Burns filed a final appeal to the Florida Supreme Court, urging them to overturn his death sentence because the jury did not get to hear evidence of Burns's psychiatric condition and low IQ before they sentenced him to death.

On November 2, 2006, the Florida Supreme Court rejected the appeal of Burns.

On July 8, 2013, Burns's appeal was denied by the 11th Circuit Court of Appeals.

On January 23, 2018, Burns lost his petition for re-sentencing to the Florida Supreme Court. The court found that Burns was not entitled to be re-sentenced under a new law because his death sentence was unanimously imposed by a jury and it was finalized in 1998, four years prior to 2002. The new law for capital punishment dictated that only unanimous jury votes were allowed for a convict to be sentenced to death in Florida, before the law was changed in 2023 to allow a person to be sentenced to death when at least eight jurors voted for a death sentence.

In February 2019, Burns filed an appeal seeking to commute his death sentence. It was revealed that in 2018, Burns was diagnosed with dementia, and hence his counsel cited the condition as a basis to remove Burns from death row.

== Death row ==
After his sentencing, Daniel Burns Jr. was transferred to death row at the Union Correctional Institution in June 1988, and during his time on death row, Burns was confined in a solitary cell measured six feet by nine feet, and was only allowed out of the cell daily for two hours of exercise, and was under constant surveillance by the correction officers. As of July 1999, Burns did not have a disciplinary record for rule violations.

Since 1987, Burns was the second convict to be sentenced to death in Manatee County, and he remained the last person sentenced to death in the county for the next 19 years until 2007, when Blaine Daniel Ross was sentenced to death by Manatee County Circuit Judge Edward Nicholas for murdering his parents.

A January 2019 report revealed that Burns was one of 103 Central Florida inmates detained on the state's death row.

In November 2021, it was reported that Burns and another two death row inmates from Florida, Michael Lee King and Granville Ritchie, received COVID stimulus funds as part of a policy implemented to American citizens affected by the COVID-19 pandemic in the United States. In the case of Burns, he received an amount of $3,200. The matter was heavily debated due to the fact that the above prisoners received the money in spite of their incarceration and death sentences.

Based on media sources and official records, Burns, who was born on January 29, 1945, was the oldest prisoner on Florida's death row as of 2026. Only four prisoners – Harry Franklin Phillips (April 21, 1945), Tommy Zeigler (July 25, 1945) Dominick Anthony Occhicone Jr. (August 29, 1945 — July 28, 2026), and James Franklin Rose (December 19, 1945) – were born in the same year as Burns, but all of them were younger than him by a range of three to 11 months.

As of 2026, Burns remains incarcerated on death row at the Union Correctional Institution.

== Aftermath ==
In April 1988, eight months after the murder of Trooper Jeffrey Young, a bridge was named after the fallen trooper after then Governor Bob Martinez signed a bill to approve the naming of the bridge in his honor.

On August 18, 2012, the 25th anniversary of Trooper Young's murder, several retired law enforcement officers spoke about his case, including Retired Florida Highway Capt. J.R. Motes and retired Manatee County Sheriff's Office Capt. Mike Mayer, who both believed that Burns deserved the death sentence and questioned why his execution did not happen yet. A spokesperson of then Governor Rick Scott revealed that Burns had not exhausted his appeals at this point and hence his death warrant could not be signed to facilitate his execution in the meantime.

In May 2018, Trooper Young's 94-year-old father, who was a World War II military veteran, received the Florida Governor's Veteran's Service Award as an appreciation of his contributions to the war service. Trooper Young's father did not lament the absence of his youngest son from the award ceremony, but he stated that the murder should not have happened, and grappled with the fact that Burns was still alive on death row and may not be executed for murdering his son.

In May 2018, a memorial was held to honor the nine fallen police officers of Manatee County, including Trooper Young. Manatee County Sheriff Rick Wells stated that it was a difficult day and he added that it was very emotional whenever he and the others talked about Trooper Young, who was Wells's former training officer.

In November 2025, Trooper Young's friends and acquaintances publicly expressed their hope for Governor Ron DeSantis to sign a death warrant for Burns and ensure that his death sentence could be carried out sooner to meet the ends of justice.

== See also ==
- Capital punishment in Florida
- List of death row inmates in the United States § Florida
