= James Ernest Hitchcock =

American convicted child murderer (1956–2026)

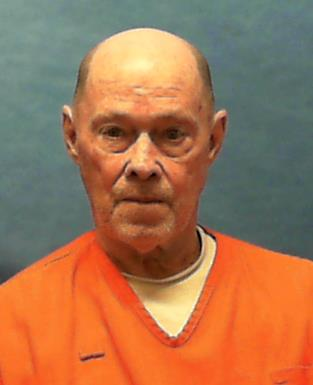
- FDOC Mugshot of Hitchcock
- Born: April 5, 1956; Arkansas, U.S.
- Died: April 30, 2026 (aged 70); Florida State Prison, Florida, U.S.
- Status: Executed by lethal injection
- Conviction: First degree murder
- Penalty: Death

Details
- Victims: Cynthia Driggers, 13
- Date: July 31, 1976
- Country: United States
- State: Florida
- Location: Winter Garden
- Imprisoned at: Union Correctional Institution (death row, before execution)

James Ernest Hitchcock (April 5, 1956 – April 30, 2026) was an American convicted child murderer. On July 31, 1976, Hitchcock raped and murdered his 13-year-old stepniece, Cynthia Driggers, at her home in Winter Garden, Florida. Hitchcock was found guilty of Driggers's murder and sentenced to death in 1977, although his death sentence was overturned thrice before it was reinstated after each re-sentencing trial. Hitchcock's death sentence was ultimately upheld and finalized, and he was executed at the Florida State Prison on April 30, 2026, nearly 50 years after he had killed Driggers.

== Early life ==
James Ernest Hitchcock was born in Arkansas on April 5, 1956, and he grew up together with six siblings in Manila, Arkansas. During Hitchcock's childhood, his family stayed in a shack and lived in poverty, and his parents made a living by picking cotton. When Hitchcock was six years old, his father contracted skin cancer and died. Hitchcock's mother later remarried, but his stepfather was often abusive towards his mother. At the age of 13, Hitchcock ran away from home after he could no longer tolerate his stepfather's abuse of his mother. Despite his difficult upbringing, Hitchcock was the first in his family to complete and receive a high school diploma. At one point in his life, Hitchcock was convicted of a burglary offense in Arkansas, but was released on parole by 1976.

== Murder of Cynthia Driggers ==
Cynthia Driggers

On August 5, 1976, Hitchcock was charged with the rape and murder of his 13-year-old stepniece, which occurred five days earlier on July 31, 1976.

About two to three weeks before the murder, Hitchcock, who was then jobless and out on parole for his burglary conviction, moved to Orlando, Florida, where he stayed with his brother and his family, with one of the members being his brother's 13-year-old stepdaughter, Cynthia Ann Driggers. On July 30, 1976, the eve of Driggers' murder, Hitchcock watched television with his brother's family until 11 p.m., before going out drinking and smoking marijuana with his friends in Winter Garden. Hitchcock only returned home at about 2:30 a.m., entering the house through the dining room window before going back to his bedroom.

Afterwards, Hitchcock entered the room of Driggers, where he raped her. After the rape, Driggers reportedly stated that she was hurt and she wanted to tell her mother about it. Hitchcock proceeded to grab her by the neck, brought her outside and tried to convince her to not tell anyone about the rape. However, Driggers resisted and yelled, and hence, Hitchcock choked and hit his stepniece before he strangled her. After the murder, Hitchcock left the body inside the bushes before he went back to the house to shower and go to bed. The body was later found, and Hitchcock was arrested as a suspect the day after the murder.

== Hitchcock's trial and first appeals ==
Less than a year after he was arrested, Hitchcock was put on trial and convicted of the first-degree murder of Cynthia Driggers. During the trial itself, he recanted his confession and claimed that Driggers voluntarily had sex with him, and that this was discovered by his brother, who killed Driggers in a fit of rage, and Hitchcock claimed he only confessed in order to cover up for his brother. This defense was rejected by the jury that convicted him. Hitchcock was later sentenced to death by the electric chair on February 11, 1977, after the jury recommended the death penalty based on a majority vote.

On February 25, 1982, the Florida Supreme Court denied Hitchcock's direct appeal against his death sentence. On October 18, 1982, the U.S. Supreme Court refused Hitchcock's appeal against his death sentence.

In February 1983, Hitchcock's lawyers appealed for clemency from Governor Bob Graham. On April 21, 1983, Governor Graham signed a death warrant for Hitchcock, ordering him to be executed by the electric chair on May 18, 1983. On May 17, 1983, the eve of Hitchcock's scheduled execution, a federal judge accepted the appeals of the defense and issued a stay of execution.

On October 18, 1984, the 11th Circuit Court of Appeals dismissed Hitchcock's appeal. On January 8, 1985, the same court granted Hitchcock's application for the appeal to be reheard.

== Re-sentencing trials ==
=== First re-sentencing ===
In September 1986, Hitchcock's lawyers appealed to the U.S. Supreme Court, arguing that the death penalty was racially biased, given that in Florida, capital punishment was imposed more frequently in the murders of white victims compared to the murders of African-American victims.

On April 22, 1987, the U.S. Supreme Court unanimously overturned the death sentence of Hitchcock, finding that the judge had erred in limiting the defense from presenting mitigatory evidence in his original trial, while they rejected that the death penalty was racially biased in his case. The court verdict became a landmark case and it also greatly affected the cases of several other prisoners on Florida's death row, opening the possibility of re-sentencing for the affected cases. By April 1988, an estimated 50 or so prisoners on Florida's death row had the potential chance to be re-sentenced due to the ruling in Hitchcock's case.

Hitchcock's re-sentencing trial took place in February 1987. During the hearing, the defense called upon eight death row inmates detained in the same prison as their client, and the prisoners testified that Hitchcock was a nice person and also a "peacemaker" throughout his time on death row. Apart from this, when Hitchcock took the stand, he continued to deny his involvement in the murder and insisted that the real murderer was his brother who killed Driggers out of rage upon discovering the sexual encounter between him and the victim, giving essentially the same account as the one he provided during his 1977 murder trial. Hitchcock even further claimed he took the fall voluntarily to go to prison in place of his brother.

On February 20, 1988, after a three-day trial, the jury recommended by a majority vote of 7–5 to sentence Hitchcock to death. On February 24, 1988, Judge Gary Formet followed the jury's recommendation and sentenced Hitchcock to death for the murder of Driggers, after he found that the testimonies of the eight death row inmates were credible but fell short of convincing the court to spare his life due to the "heinous, atrocious and cruel" murder of Driggers. He further found that Hitchcock was truly guilty of the murder of his stepniece and rejected Hitchcock's attempt to finger his brother as the killer.

On December 20, 1990, the Florida Supreme Court dismissed Hitchcock's appeal against his second death sentence. On October 16, 1991, the U.S. Supreme Court refused Hitchcock's appeal against his second death sentence.

=== Second re-sentencing ===
On June 30, 1992, the U.S. Supreme Court overturned the death sentences of Hitchcock and five other inmates on the fact that the juries in these cases made use of an improper standard to mete out their respective death sentences.

On January 28, 1993, the Florida Supreme Court ordered that Hitchcock should be re-sentenced for the murder of Driggers and remanded his case back to the trial courts. That same year, a third jury unanimously ordered the death penalty for Hitchcock.

=== Third re-sentencing ===
On March 21, 1996, the Florida Supreme Court overturned the death sentence of Hitchcock once again, after they found that the sentencing of Hitchcock was erroneously affected by the unverified child sex allegations against Hitchcock in his previous round of re-sentencing back in 1993, which made it prejudicial and denied him his right to fair and impartial sentencing.

On September 11, 1996, a fourth jury voted 10–2 to recommend the death penalty for Hitchcock, and since the jury's recommendation was non-binding, it was up to Judge Michael Cycmanick to decide whether to impose life imprisonment or the death penalty. That same year, Judge Cycmanick formally sentenced Hitchcock to death a fourth time.

== Subsequent appeals ==
On November 5, 1999, Hitchcock's direct appeal against his fourth death sentence was heard by the Florida Supreme Court. On March 23, 2000, Hitchcock's appeal was turned down and his fourth death sentence was thus affirmed by the Florida Supreme Court.

On January 16, 2004, the Florida Supreme Court denied Hitchcock's appeal for DNA testing, as they were not convinced that any DNA testing could lead to a change in his sentence. On May 22, 2008, Hitchcock's post-conviction appeal was denied by the Florida Supreme Court.

On March 12, 2014, the 11th Circuit Court of Appeals turned down Hitchcock's appeal. On August 10, 2017, the Florida Supreme Court rejected Hitchcock's re-sentencing plea. A year prior, the state of Florida changed its laws to allow juries to only impose death sentences with unanimous votes, and although Hitchcock's sentence was meted out via a majority vote of 10–2, the court deemed Hitchcock ineligible for re-sentencing because he already exhausted his appeals before the 2002 landmark ruling of Ring v. Arizona.

By January 2019, Hitchcock was the longest-serving prisoner on death row for crimes committed in Central Florida. By April 2026 (the same month of his execution), Hitchcock was the fourth longest-serving death row prisoner in the whole of Florida, only surpassed by Tommy Zeigler (July 16, 1976), Henry Perry Sireci (November 15, 1976), and Harold Gene Lucas (February 9, 1977). After Hitchcock's execution, James Franklin Rose (May 13, 1977), who was condemned for the 1976 kidnap-murder of a girl, took his place as the fourth longest-serving prisoner on Florida's death row.

== Execution ==
On March 31, 2026, Governor Ron DeSantis signed a death warrant for Hitchcock, scheduling his execution date as April 30, 2026.

Upon receiving the news of Hitchcock's death warrant, Cynthia Driggers' family reportedly felt a mixed sense of relief and recalling of the tragedy. Driggers' younger sister stated that the decades of legal processes dragged on in her sister's murder were an "inescapable loop", and a female cousin of Driggers stated that the family had waited 50 years for justice to be served, and implied that two of their surviving family members hoped to live longer than Hitchcock. St. Lucie County Judge Robert Meadows, who was Driggers' cousin, revealed that his background in the judiciary made him often hear questions about why there was a lengthy delay in Driggers' case and he found it hard to give a reply. Driggers' mother stated her wish for Hitchcock to be executed for murdering her daughter.

On April 24, 2026, the Florida Supreme Court rejected Hitchcock's appeal against his death sentence. The U.S. Supreme Court denied a final appeal on the morning before his execution.

On April 30, 2026, Hitchcock was put to death by lethal injection at the Florida State Prison. He was pronounced dead at 6:12 p.m. Hitchcock was one of two offenders executed on the same date in the United States; the other was James Broadnax, who was convicted in 2008 of killing two music producers in Texas. Prior to his execution, Hitchcock received a final visit from a family member, and requested a last meal of salad, chicken, ice cream, pie and soda.

== See also ==
- Capital punishment in Florida
- List of people executed in Florida
- List of people executed in the United States in 2026
- List of longest prison sentences served

Executions carried out in Florida
Preceded by Chadwick Scott Willacy April 21, 2026	James Ernest Hitchcock; April 30, 2026	Succeeded by Richard Andrew Knight Jr. May 21, 2026
Executions carried out in the United States
Preceded by Chadwick Scott Willacy – Florida April 21, 2026	James Ernest Hitchcock – Florida; April 30, 2026	Succeeded by James Garfield Broadnax – Texas April 30, 2026
