= James Franklin Rose =

American convicted murderer (born 1945)

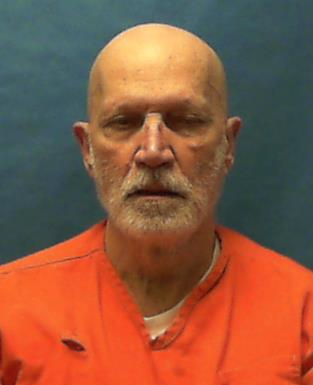
- Born: December 19, 1945 (age 80)
- Occupation: House painter
- Status: Incarcerated on death row
- Convictions: First degree murder (2 counts); Kidnapping; Burglary; Burglary with assault
- Penalty: Death (Berry); Life without parole (Savage)

Details
- Victims: 2
- Date: April 4, 1975 (Savage murder); October 22, 1976 (Berry murder)
- State: Florida
- Locations: Delray Beach (Savage murder); Fort Lauderdale (Berry Kidnapping); Davie (Berry Body Found)
- Imprisoned at: Union Correctional Institution

James Franklin Rose (born December 19, 1945) is an American convicted murderer who killed two people in 1975 and 1976 respectively. In the first case, Rose raped and murdered 37-year-old Jean Savage on April 4, 1975, while in the second case, Rose kidnapped and murdered eight-year-old Lisa Lynn Berry, the daughter of his former girlfriend on October 22, 1976.

Rose was first arrested and charged with the murder of Lisa Berry, and sentenced to death thrice in 1977, 1983 and 1998 respectively, with his death sentence overturned twice before it was reinstated for the third and final time. The Jean Savage murder case was unsolved for 41 years before DNA testing linked Rose to the murder, for which he was charged in 2016, and Rose was sentenced to life without parole in 2018 after pleading guilty to the crime. Rose remains on death row as of 2026 for Berry's murder.

== Personal life ==
Born on December 19, 1945, James Franklin Rose grew up in an impoverished family home without a father, and his mother was abusive and neglectful towards him. When he was a child, Rose's mother often locked him in a closet, where he would be confined for long hours, and would attempt to abandon and leave Rose out alone whenever they went outdoors. As a student, Rose was a slow learner who was retained in the fourth, fifth, and seventh grades. Psychiatric tests showed that Rose had a personality disorder and a low IQ of 84, and he was also a chronic alcoholic.

Rose had a lengthy criminal record in his early life before he committed murder in the 1970s. He was convicted of grand larceny in 1969, and two years later, he was convicted of breaking and entering with intent to rape in 1971. Rose was paroled in 1975 after he spent four years in prison for this particular offence before his arrest for murder in 1976.

== Murders ==
=== Jean Savage ===
On April 4, 1975, James Rose committed his first murder, killing and raping 37-year-old housewife Jean Savage at her house in Delray Beach, Florida.

According to sources, on the night of her murder, Savage's naked body was discovered by her husband Edwin Savage, who returned home from work at that time, and reports showed that Savage had been raped and stabbed multiple times before her death. Edwin, who worked as an aircraft salesman in Fort Lauderdale, was ruled out as a suspect since he had an alibi of working all day on the day of the incident, and he died of cancer four years later in 1981. Investigations also ruled out the possibility of a hired hitman, because there was the element of rape, which typically did not exist in murder-for-hire cases, and it was also possible for the killer to break inside the house to commit the murder. Given that there were no valuables missing from the house, the police also ruled out robbery as a motive.

Based on psychological profile of the suspect at that time, the police deduced that the perpetrator could be mentally disturbed and was also possibly involved in other sex-related murders. A Palm Beach County sheriff's detective commented to a newspaper that the killing of Savage was "among the most brutal murders" he ever investigated.

The rape and murder of Savage was left unsolved for four decades before the authorities managed to link Rose to the killing based on DNA test results that matched Rose to the crime. Based on his confession, Rose admitted that he killed Savage, and added that he was paid to do the killing by Savage's husband Edwin, claiming that Edwin gave him a house key apart from some money, which allowed him to gain entry into Savage's house, and committed the rape and murder. However, there was no other testimony or evidence to prove that Edwin was involved in the murder in spite of Rose's confession.

=== Lisa Lynn Berry ===
On October 22, 1976, a year after he murdered Savage, Rose would kidnap and murder eight-year-old Lisa Lynn Berry, who was the daughter of Rose's ex-girlfriend, in Fort Lauderdale, Florida.

Background information showed that Rose had a nine-month relationship with Berry's mother Barbara, who had Berry from a previous relationship. However, six months before the murder, Barbara broke the relationship off, mainly due to the fact that Rose was jealous of Berry's mother for working at a bowling alley and often interacting with other men. The prosecution's contention was that Rose's motive to kill Berry was out of jealous rage due to his belief that the girl's mother was seeing other men. On October 22, 1976, the date of Berry's murder, Rose entered the bowling alley where her mother worked, and he picked up the girl from the premises before he left. Afterwards, Rose beat the girl to death with a hammer and abandoned her body in a canal at Davie, Florida.

Two hours after Berry's abduction and murder, Rose returned to the bowling alley, and witness testimony revealed that Rose was seen with a large red spot on his pants, and later forensic tests certified that it was Type B blood belonging to Berry. A search was conducted to locate the missing girl, whose nude body was found four days later in the same canal where Rose disposed of it, which was located approximately ten miles from the bowling alley. A paint-stained hammer was found in the canal, and these paint stains matched the ones contained in Rose's paint cans. A search in the van led to the discovery of Berry's blouse, and bloodstains belonging to Berry were also found on the passenger's door of Rose's white van. An autopsy report confirmed that Berry died of severe head injuries caused by blunt force.

The search for Berry after her disappearance was noted to be the largest search over conducted for a missing person in Broward County at that time. Berry was survived by her mother and two younger siblings. Rose was arrested and charged with Berry's murder shortly after the discovery of her corpse.

== Arrest and murder trial ==
On November 11, 1976, a grand jury formally indicted Rose for the kidnapping and murder of Berry.

Initially, Rose stood trial in March 1977 before a Fort Lauderdale jury for the murder of Berry. However, the trial ended with a hung jury, and as a result, Rose was re-tried for the murder charge in a different court, moved from the original venue of Fort Lauderdale to Tampa due to pre-trial publicity.

On May 7, 1977, Rose was found guilty of first-degree murder at the end of his second trial. On that same day, the jury recommended the death penalty for the murder of Lisa Berry. It was revealed in Rose's 1982 appeal that the jury's original vote for capital punishment was tied by 6–6, and by default, this vote would have resulted in a life sentence, but the judge directed the jury to further deliberate the sentence, which ultimately led to the jury's final vote for the death penalty.

On May 13, 1977, Rose was formally sentenced to death by Circuit Judge M. Daniel Futch Jr., and reports showed that Rose was emotionless at the time of sentencing. Apart from the death sentence, Rose was also sentenced to life in prison for the other charge of kidnapping.

== Appeals and re-sentencing bids ==
=== First appeal and re-sentencing trial ===
On December 9, 1982, the Florida Supreme Court vacated James Rose's death sentence and approved his appeal, granting him a re-sentencing trial. The court found that the original trial judge, M. Daniel Futch Jr., had erred in directing the jury to reconsider the sentence when the vote was tied, a result which should have spared Rose the death sentence and by default sentenced him to life imprisonment.

In 1983, a different jury heard the case of Rose, and by a majority vote of 11–1, the jury imposed the death sentence, and Rose was therefore re-sentenced to death by a court judge.

=== Second appeal process and second re-sentencing trial ===
On December 6, 1984, the Florida Supreme Court rejected Rose's direct appeal against his second death sentence.

On June 2, 1985, the U.S. Supreme Court rejected Rose's appeal.

Originally, Rose was scheduled to be put to death by the electric chair on September 3, 1986. However, on August 27, 1986, Rose was granted a stay of execution by the Florida Supreme Court.

On May 7, 1987, the Florida Supreme Court rejected Rose's petition for writ of habeas corpus.

On November 2, 1987, Rose's appeal was denied by the U.S. Supreme Court.

On March 7, 1996, the Florida Supreme Court overturned Rose's death sentence and ordered a new sentencing hearing, after they found that Rose was represented by ineffective counsel during his first re-sentencing trial and hence he was entitled to be re-sentenced.

On April 4, 1997, at the end of Rose's second re-sentencing trial, a third jury voted 9–3 to recommend the death penalty for Rose.

On February 14, 1998, Circuit Judge Paul Backman formally re-sentenced Rose to death a second time, and in his verdict, Judge Backman remarked that based on the nature of his crime, Rose had "forfeited (his) right to live in a free society" and in turn "forfeited (his) right to live", and therefore rejected the defence's arguments for mercy in favour of capital punishment.

=== Third round of appeals ===
On April 5, 2001, the Florida Supreme Court upheld the death sentence of Rose and dismissed his appeal.

In June 2001, Rose was the first of 29 death row inmates from Broward County to undergo post-conviction DNA testing. According to the defence, Rose did not oppose to the testing and believed that he could be exonerated.

In February 2002, the U.S. Supreme Court received an appeal from Rose, who sought to not only overturn his death sentence, but also to consolidate his case with an ongoing lawsuit titled Ring v. Arizona, which challenged the practice of judges imposing the death sentence for convicts instead of juries and that the juries should have a final say on the said convict's sentence. On March 18, 2002, the U.S. Supreme Court denied Rose's petition.

On March 13, 2008, the Florida Supreme Court rejected Rose's appeal and dismissed his allegations of ineffective legal representation.

A October 2013 official report to the Florida governor revealed that Rose was one of four inmates from Florida's death row who did not timely file a federal habeas corpus petition under the AEDPA within the time frame allowed.

== 2016 murder charge and second trial ==
In 2015, 40 years after the murder of Jean Savage, cold case investigators managed to make a breakthrough in solving the case, after DNA tests matched James Rose as the owner of the DNA profile found on the scene of crime and evidence. Based on the DNA test results, the cold case investigators probed Rose regarding the killing, and Rose eventually confessed to the murder, for which he was charged. On September 30, 2016, Rose was formally indicted by a grand jury for the murder of Savage, 41 years after she was killed.

On December 12, 2016, Rose was transferred to the Palm Beach County Jail, where he would be detained while pending trial for the murder of Savage. He was first arraigned on December 13, 2016, at the Palm Beach County Circuit Court.

On November 19, 2018, Rose admitted to the first-degree murder of Savage under a plea agreement in which prosecutors agreed not to seek the death penalty. After Rose submitted his guilty plea, Circuit Judge Laura S. Johnson sentenced Rose to life imprisonment without the possibility of parole.

== Current status and aftermath ==
As of 2026, James Rose remains on death row at the Union Correctional Institution.

As of May 2019, Rose was listed as one of Florida's 19 inmates condemned to death row for murders that took place within Hillsborough County. A 2026 report showed that Rose was South Florida's longest-serving death row inmate. Overall, as of September 2026, Rose is the third longest-serving death row prisoner in the whole of Florida, only surpassed by Tommy Zeigler (July 16, 1976) and Henry Perry Sireci (November 15, 1976),

Additionally, Rose, who was born on December 19, 1945, was the fifth oldest inmate in Florida's death row as of June 2026, chronologically younger than Daniel Burns Jr. (January 29, 1945), Harry Franklin Phillips (April 21, 1945), Tommy Zeigler (July 25, 1945) and Dominick Anthony Occhicone Jr. (August 29, 1945 - July 28, 2026).

In March 2024, reports highlighted a notable trend on Florida's death row: many condemned inmates had outlived the judges who originally sentenced them to death, and Rose was notably one of those prisoners. The judge who presided over his trial and imposed the death sentence, M. Daniel Futch Jr., died in 2009 at the age of 75, 32 years after sending Rose to death row.

== See also ==
- Capital punishment in Florida
- List of death row inmates in the United States § Florida
