= George Duckett =

George Duckett may refer to:

- George Duckett (Calne MP) (1684–1732), British MP for Calne
- Sir George Duckett, 1st Baronet (1725–1822), born George Jackson, British MP for Weymouth & Melcombe Regis, Colchester
- Sir George Duckett, 2nd Baronet (1777–1856), British landowner and politician, son of the above
- Sir George Floyd Duckett (1811–1902), English soldier and antiquarian, son of the above
- George Duckett (police officer), Commissioner of Police of Bermuda, who was murdered

== See also ==
- Duckett (surname)
