= Jeffrey Young =

Jeffrey Young or Jeff Young may refer to:

- Jeffrey Young (psychologist) (born 1950), American psychologist
- Jeff Young (born 1962), American guitarist, formerly of Megadeth
- Jeff Young (rugby union) (1942–2005), British rugby player
- Jeff Young (singer) (d. 2011), American singer and member of Somethin' for the People
- Jeffery Young Jr., (born 1986) American politician
- Jeffrey Dale Young, American murder victim and police trooper of the Florida Highway Patrol
