= Jimmy Hitchcock (disambiguation) =

Jimmy Hitchcock (1911–1959) was an American football and baseball player.

James, Jim or Jimmy Hitchcock may also refer to:

- James Ernest Hitchcock (1956–2026), American executed child murderer
- Jimmy Hitchcock (cornerback) (born 1970), National Football League player
- Jimmy Hitchcock (golfer) (1930–2015), English golfer
- Ripley Hitchcock (1857–1918), American editor, born James Ripley Wellman Hitchcock
