= Murder of Denise Amber Lee =

2008 murder in Florida, United States

- Denise Amber Lee
- Location: North Port, Florida, U.S.
- Date: January 17, 2008; 18 years ago
- Attack type: Murder by shooting, rape and kidnapping
- Victims: Denise Amber Lee, aged 21
- Perpetrator: Michael Lee King
- Verdict: Guilty on all counts
- Convictions: First-degree murder; Sexual battery; Kidnapping
- Sentence: Death (First Degree Murder); Life Imprisonment without parole (Kidnapping); 30 years imprisonment (Sexual battery)

The murder of Denise Amber Lee occurred in North Port, Florida, United States, on January 17, 2008. Lee was a 21-year-old woman who was kidnapped, raped, and murdered by 36-year-old Michael Lee King. The murder case became notorious because Lee and several others had attempted to call for help through the 9-1-1 system, but there was a lack of communication and the police and other emergency services arrived too late.

Five 9-1-1 calls were made that day, including one by Lee herself from her abductor's phone and one from a witness, Jane Kowalski, who gave a detailed account of events as they unfolded before her. Failures were found in the way the 9-1-1 operators handled Kowalski's call, and additional failures were identified nationwide in the 9-1-1 system. In 2009, King was found guilty of the kidnapping, sexual battery and murder of Denise Amber Lee. He was sentenced to death, and executed by lethal injection in March 2026.

The Denise Amber Lee Act was passed unanimously by the Florida Legislature on April 24, 2008. This act provides for optional training for 9-1-1 operators. Lee's family continue to lobby for a new law to be passed nationwide that would institute mandatory training and certification for all 9-1-1 dispatchers. The Denise Amber Lee Foundation was established in June 2008 to promote such training as well as to raise public awareness of the issues involved. Lee was the daughter of a police detective, Sgt. Rick Goff.

== Victim ==
Denise Amber Lee (née Goff; August 6, 1986 – January 17, 2008) was born in Englewood, Florida. Lee was the daughter of Sgt. Rick Goff, of the sheriff's office in Charlotte County, and Sue Goff. She was the mother of a 2-year-old and a 6-month-old at the time of her murder. Not long after their first date, Lee's husband, Nathan, bought her a $40 heart-shaped ring which she had never removed. The ring later became key evidence connecting perpetrator and victim.

== Perpetrator ==
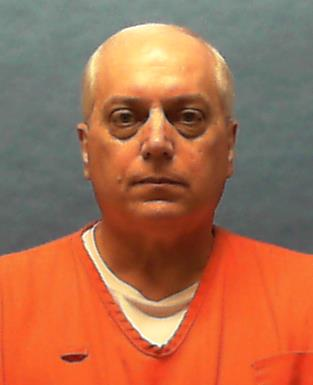
Michael Lee King

Michael Lee King (May 4, 1971 – March 17, 2026) trained as a plumber but had been unemployed for several months before the crime and was facing foreclosure on his home in North Port, Florida. He was married and divorced. He had a low IQ, and family members described to the court how King had an accident while sledding as a child; an expert witness described the subsequent injury as a "divot" in his brain.

== Crime ==
On January 17, 2008, King abducted Lee from her home. He drove her around, tied up in his vehicle, for quite some time; several people witnessed the journey. Later, King raped and murdered Lee and buried her in a shallow grave. Her body was found on January 19, 2008.

Nathan was at work that Thursday (January 17, 2008); and Lee was at home with their two young children. She called him at 11:21 a.m., the last time the two would speak. Among the topics discussed was the nice weather: the couple decided that the windows should be open at home. She said she had already opened them. Nathan arrived home around 3:30 p.m. to find the windows closed, his wife missing, and the children home alone in the same crib. This prompted him to make his 9-1-1 call, the first of the day related to this crime.

A neighbor saw a car arrive at Lee's home around 2 p.m. The car was later identified as King's dark green 1994 Chevrolet Camaro.

Lee was bound and taken to King's home in North Port, Florida, where he set up what the prosecution in the trial referred to as a "rape room." Duct tape and other evidence were found in this room.

She was taken to King's cousin Harold Muxlow's home, where King then borrowed a shovel, a gas can, and a flashlight. Lee was able to take King's cell phone while he was out of the vehicle and dial 9-1-1. Her desperate 9-1-1 call was released during the trial, which caused a lot of reaction from the public. The operator obtained information from Lee, which later helped convict King. The call is several minutes long, with Lee begging for her life, saying "please" 17 times. She answered the call taker's questions while pretending to talk to King. Judge Deno Economou, the presiding judge over the murder trial, noted how unusual and rare it was to hear a murder victim's last words. Prosecutors said later that Lee had given them their best evidence that she was taken against her will. She did not know her abductor, and her subsequent murder was premeditated. Lee was unable to give her exact location. Police were unable to trace Lee's location because King's cellphone was a prepaid wireless phone.

At 6:30 p.m., while driving on US‑41, Jane Kowalski called 911 to report what she believed was a possible abduction. She told the operator that a Camaro had stopped beside her at a traffic light and that she heard screaming from inside the vehicle. With the sun setting, she misidentified the car’s color and assumed the person screaming was a child. Kowalski reported seeing a hand striking the passenger‑side window and briefly made eye contact with the driver. She attempted to follow the vehicle, but it turned before she could do so. Because the call was placed just beyond the Sarasota County line, it was routed to Charlotte County’s 911 center.

At 9:15 p.m., roughly six hours after Lee was first reported missing, King was arrested.

== Trial ==
The trial of the State of Florida vs. Michael L. King officially began on August 24, 2009. The lead prosecuting attorney was Assistant State Attorney Lon Arend. The lead defense attorney was Public Defender Carolyn Schlemmer. The presiding judge was Deno Economou, and the trial occurred in Sarasota County, Florida.

The prosecution presented DNA, and other forensic evidence, including hair and personal articles of Lee's found around and within the Camaro, King's home, and the grave site. Other evidence included King's change of clothing, duct tape, a shell casing, the shovel, and King's cell phone. The prosecution also called eyewitnesses, including Jane Kowalski and King's cousin. The defense attempted to provide reasonable doubt by bringing evidence of tampering and contamination to the jury and suggesting that one of King's friends had committed the crime. The judge disapproved of the latter defense. The defense rested without calling any witnesses.

On August 28, 2009, after deliberating for two hours and five minutes, the jury found King guilty of kidnapping with intent to commit a felony, sexual battery, and first-degree murder. On September 4, 2009, at 2:45 pm, the jury handed down the recommended sentence of death in a 12–0 vote.

== Execution ==
On February 13, 2026, Florida Governor Ron DeSantis scheduled King to be executed on March 17, 2026. King was the second of three inmates from Florida who were scheduled to be executed within the same month of March; the first was Billy Leon Kearse (March 3, 2026) and child murderer James Aren Duckett (March 31, 2026). Kearse was since executed as scheduled, while Duckett's execution was stayed due to legal issues, before his execution was rescheduled and ultimately carried out on July 28, 2026.

On March 17, 2026, 54-year-old Michael Lee King was executed by lethal injection at 6:13 p.m. His last meal consisted of pizza, ice cream, soda and tater tots.

According to Gov. Ron DeSantis' office, his nearly inaudible last words were:

“Since finding Jesus in prison, I have tried to live as His disciple obeying the Two Great Commandments: To love God with all my heart, my mind and all my being, and to love my neighbor to include everyone - my family, Denise Lee’s family, everyone in the gallery”, as well as Catholic volunteers who visit the prison and "those on the team to end my life".

== The 9-1-1 calls ==
In total, five 9-1-1 calls related to Lee's disappearance were placed by five people between 3:29 p.m. and 6:30 p.m. on January 17, 2008. Four were routed to operators in Sarasota County, Florida; the other—placed by Jane Kowalski and the fourth in the sequence—was routed to operators in neighboring Charlotte County, Florida. The call routed to Charlotte County was grossly mishandled.

Lee placed the second call at 6:14 p.m. from her abductor's cell phone. The state prosecutors presented this call as part of the key evidence at King's trial.

Jane Kowalski's call was placed by cell phone at 6:30 p.m. while she was driving on U.S. Route 41. "I was at a stoplight, and a man pulled up next to me, and a child was screaming in the car," she said. She explained further that she heard "terrifying screaming" and "never heard anything like that." Kowalski believed that she was witnessing a child abduction. She also identified the car as a Camaro but stated the color as blue (rather than green). She stated that she had made eye contact with the driver, after which "a hand came up and started banging on the passenger window." Since she had crossed the county line into Charlotte, the call was routed to Charlotte County's 9-1-1 call center. It was only after she saw the news the following day that she realized she had witnessed the abduction of Lee rather than that of a child. When she called the North Port Police Department to explain who she was and that she had made a 9-1-1 call, it became apparent that the call had not been forwarded to the proper authorities. This call was grossly mishandled because the operators neglected to file it correctly as required. The state prosecutors also presented this call as part of the key evidence at King's trial.

== Legacy ==
Due to Jane Kowalski's mishandled 9-1-1 call, more research revealed several issues countrywide in the 9-1-1 system, a non-profit organization with the mission to "promote and support public safety through uniform training, standardized protocols, defined measurable outcomes, and technological advances in the 9-1-1 system." was established in June 2008 in Lee's name.

On April 24, 2008, the Senate Bill, CS/SB 1694, concerning the Denise Amber Lee Act, which provides for voluntary training for 9-1-1 operators, was passed unanimously by the Florida Legislature. The act's passage into state law continues.

In 2010, House Bill CS/HB 355 and Senate Bill CS/SB 742 were to address the fact that 9-1-1 operators in the state are not required to undertake mandatory training. Lee's husband Nathan and her father Rick continued to lobby in Tallahassee to get Denise's Law passed, which recommended mandatory training and certification for all 9-1-1 dispatchers.

A separate bill, also in 2010 and sponsored by Representative Robert C. Schenck, would have placed significant limitations on 9-1-1 calls when played in public. The Lee family spoke against this bill. The governor of Florida, Charlie Crist, said that he was "not favorably inclined toward the bill". The bill was later dropped.

== See also ==
- Amber alert
- Carlie's Law
- Jessica's Law
- List of kidnappings (2000–2009)
- List of people executed in Florida
- List of people executed in the United States in 2026

Executions carried out in Florida
Preceded by Billy Leon Kearse March 3, 2026	Michael Lee King; March 17, 2026	Succeeded by Chadwick Scott Willacy April 21, 2026
Executions carried out in the United States
Preceded by Cedric Allen Ricks – Texas March 11, 2026	Micahel Lee King – Florida; March 17, 2026	Succeeded by Chadwick Scott Willacy – Florida April 21, 2026
