= James Aren Duckett =

American policeman, convicted murderer and suspected serial killer (1957–2026)

- Duckett in 1987
- Born: September 4, 1957; Florida, U.S.
- Died: July 28, 2026 (aged 68); Florida State Prison, Raiford, Florida, U.S.
- Status: Executed by lethal injection
- Convictions: First degree murder Sexual battery
- Penalty: Death

Details
- Victims: 1 confirmed, 2 suspected
- Date: May 7, 1986 (suspected) – September 19, 1987 (suspected)
- Location: Florida
- Imprisoned at: Union Correctional Institution (death row)

James Aren Duckett (September 4, 1957 – July 28, 2026) was an American convicted child murderer, sex offender and suspected serial killer sentenced to death in Florida. Duckett, a former police officer under the Mascotte Police Department, was charged with the kidnapping, rape, and murder of 11-year-old Teresa Mae McAbee on May 11, 1987. Duckett was said to have abducted the girl, who was raped and later strangled, and her body was found abandoned near a lake. Apart from McAbee's murder, Duckett was also a suspect in the 1987 unsolved murder of 14-year-old Jeanifer Shyan Weldon and 22-year-old Ronette Lynn Peterson in 1986. Duckett was convicted of McAbee's murder and sentenced to death. He was executed on July 28, 2026.

== Murder of Teresa McAbee ==
On the night of May 11, 1987, 29-year-old James Aren Duckett first encountered 11-year-old Teresa Mae McAbee. Duckett was a police officer affiliated with the Mascotte Police Department, and was on patrol duty throughout the city of Mascotte, Florida. He spotted McAbee walking out of a convenience store with a 16-year-old boy. Duckett apparently asked the convenience store clerk about the girl's age before he approached both McAbee and the boy, questioning them before he instructed McAbee to go home.

The boy later returned to the convenience store where he was met by an uncle, and the pair witnessed Duckett and McAbee standing near Duckett's patrol car. According to the boy and his uncle, Duckett and McAbee entered the police car and departed the scene. It was the last time McAbee was seen alive.

A fisherman discovered McAbee's body the following day near the shore of Knight Lake. Duckett was named as a suspect because he was the last person seen with McAbee and he was also the only police officer on duty the day of the murder. As a result, Duckett was suspended from the police force on June 16, 1987, and he was fired three days later, ending his seven-month employment as a police officer.

Investigators found three key pieces of circumstantial evidence that led to Duckett's arrest and conviction. The first was a pubic hair left at the scene of the crime that matched Duckett. DNA tests on the police car showed that the palm prints of Duckett and McAbee were on the hood of his police vehicle, and investigators matched tire tracks near the crime scene to that vehicle.

Based on this circumstantial evidence, investigators deduced that Duckett had not sent McAbee home, but instead had kidnapped the child, raped her, and strangled her.

== Suspected murders ==
=== Ronette Lynn Peterson ===
On May 7, 1986, an unnamed woman was discovered dead in a water-filled pit near Lakeland, Florida. The woman was petite, 5 feet 2 inches tall, with reddish-brown hair and blue to hazel eyes. She was fully clothed when her body was discovered, and wore an aqua-blue shirt and jeans. The cause of death was strangulation. The woman was last seen entering a dark blue car. Duckett owned a royal blue Buick Regal at the time, similar to the car that the victim entered before her disappearance and death.

In 2006, the victim was identified as 22-year-old Ronette Lynn Peterson, who came from Madrid, Iowa. Peterson relocated from Iowa to Florida in January 1986, four months before her death. The family filed a missing person report after Peterson, who regularly wrote letters to them, stopped writing to them. Peterson was identified after her fingerprints, which were collected after her 1983 arrest for drunk driving in Des Moines, Iowa, were matched to the victim.

As of 2026, the case remains unsolved.

=== Jeanifer Weldon ===
On September 19, 1987, three days before her 15th birthday, Jeanifer Shyan Weldon disappeared. She was reportedly going to visit a friend and was last seen walking alone from a carnival.

Weldon was reported missing by her mother a day later, after she failed to return home. Weldon's body was found on October 2, 1987, near Auburndale, Florida.

Investigators working Weldon's murder suspected that Duckett was the killer. Duckett, then fired from the police force due to his suspected involvement in Teresa McAbee's murder, was working as a night-shift laborer in a local phosphate mine in Polk County and often drove to work through the area where Weldon's body was found. Gasoline receipts also showed that Duckett was near the scene of the crime on the date of Weldon's murder, and he arrived for work two hours late that day and was disheveled. Weldon was noted to be carrying a green shopping bag and a stuffed toy before she went missing, and neither were found with her body. Duckett's wife told investigators that her husband brought home a lime-green shopping bag with a stuffed toy for their two children. Later, it was made public that Duckett's wife identified "scratch marks" on his back. He told his wife that the injury was due to crawling under barbed wire.

In 2003, 16 years after Weldon's murder, the Polk County police force expressed their intent to press charges against Duckett for Weldon's murder. They wanted to ensure that Duckett remained behind bars even if he successfully appealed his conviction in the McAbee case.

On July 30, 2026, 48 hours after his execution, Sheriff Grady Judd announced during a morning press conference that investigators were confident in naming James Duckett as the suspect of the homicide. Judd added the case was being forwarded to the State Attorney's Office for a final review so that the case could be considered "exceptionally cleared," closing the nearly 39-year-old case. During the press conference, it was noted that Polk County Sheriff's Office detectives went to Florida State Prison before Duckett was executed to speak with him about the murder. Judd said that Duckett refused to leave his cell and speak with them.

== Trial ==
In October 1987, five months after Teresa McAbee's death, a Lake County grand jury formally indicted Duckett for her murder.

In early 1988, Duckett stood trial before a Lake County jury for first-degree murder, and the prosecution confirmed they would seek the death penalty. During the trial itself, Michael Malone, a forensic expert of the FBI testified that, based on his examination of 20 pubic hairs taken from Duckett, the hair taken from the crime scene matched the defendant. The defense challenged the validity of the evidence, countering that the hair could be from another person. The prosecution similarly submitted the tire mark and palm print evidence to show the defendant's guilt in court.

On May 10, 1988, the jury found Duckett guilty of first-degree murder and sexual battery. On that same day, the jury recommended the death penalty for Duckett.

During the sentencing phase of his murder trial, Duckett took the stand in his own defense. He denied any involvement in the murder and asked the jury to spare his life.

On June 30, 1988, Lake County Circuit Judge Jerry Lockett sentenced Duckett to death by the electric chair. He handed down an additional sentence of 25 years to life with no possibility of parole for the sexual battery charge. Prior to his sentencing, Duckett continued to insist he was innocent and asked for his life to be spared.

== Death row ==
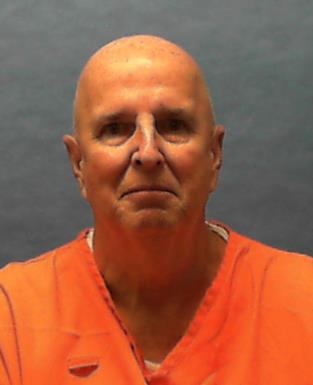
Death row mugshot of Duckett

As of June 2000, Duckett was one of 370 inmates incarcerated on death row in Florida.

=== Appeals ===
On December 6, 1989, Duckett filed his first appeal to the Florida Supreme Court. On September 6, 1990, the Florida Supreme Court dismissed Duckett's direct appeal against his death sentence.

On August 16, 2001, Circuit Judge Jerry Lockett denied Duckett's post-conviction appeal and upheld his death sentence and murder conviction.

In April 2003, defense counsel appealed for a review of their client's case and new DNA testing to ascertain his guilt. On October 4, 2003, Circuit Judge William Law granted Duckett's application for new DNA testing on a small semen sample pertaining to his case. The Florida Supreme Court later granted approval and set the deadline on January 15, 2004, to allow more time for new DNA testing. Ultimately, the deadline of January 15, 2004, passed and there was no motion filed over the DNA testing to the circuit court of the Florida Supreme Court. On February 7, 2004, Circuit Judge William Law issued a court order to bar any more DNA testing in Duckett's case.

In February 2005, defense counsel appealed again to seek a review of Duckett's case, stating that one of the trial witnesses, then a 16-year-old girl, had lied to the court about seeing Duckett outside the store before Teresa McAbee's disappearance and death, and was instructed to do so by the law enforcement officers and prosecution, although these allegations were denied by the police and prosecutors. On October 6, 2005, the Florida Supreme Court rejected Duckett's second appeal against his death sentence. On that day, three other convicted murderers – Jim Eric Chandler, McArthur Breedlove and Michael Duane Zack III – also lost their appeals against their death sentences. Ultimately, Zack was executed on October 3, 2023 for the murder of Ravonne Smith.

On March 26, 2010, U.S. District Court Judge William Terrell Hodges denied Duckett's federal appeal against his death sentence.

On June 26, 2014, the Florida Supreme Court denied Duckett's appeal, and also rejected his allegations of false witness testimony and disputed credibility of the pubic hair evidence against him.

On October 12, 2017, the Florida Supreme Court rejected Duckett's fourth appeal against his death sentence. The court found that despite the disputed validity of the pubic hair evidence against Duckett, his guilt was supported by other evidence like the tire marks matched to Duckett's police car near the scene of crime.

On December 28, 2018, the Florida Supreme Court dismissed Duckett's re-sentencing plea, finding that the hair evidence was not the only evidence used to prove his guilt and convict him, as there were other sources of circumstantial evidence that demonstrated his culpability and role in the murder. Aside from this, Duckett had already exhausted his direct appeal prior to June 24, 2002, the date of a landmark U.S. Supreme Court ruling that validated death sentences imposed by juries rather than judges, and hence he was not entitled to re-sentencing.

=== Alleged innocence ===
During Duckett's incarceration on death row, there were concerns surrounding the validity of his guilt due to the disputed evidence in his case, with some experts believing that Duckett was not guilty of the murder of Teresa McAbee. In fact, for years, defense counsel had advocated for a review of his case.

In May 2003, Marshall Frank, a retired homicide detective and aspiring novelist, stated that he conducted research in Duckett's case while writing a new book, and he concluded that Duckett was innocent, stating that the prosecution had wrongly interpreted the fingerprint and palmprint evidence, and also made a blunder with the pubic hair and tire mark evidence, as well as overlooking factors that were in Duckett's favor. Apart from Frank, former Mascotte Police Chief Michael Brady expressed that he believed in the innocence of Duckett, who previously worked under him, and Mayor Josh Thomas similarly believed that Duckett was not guilty. Several years after Duckett's conviction, Michael Malone, the FBI expert who submitted the incriminating pubic hair evidence in Duckett's trial, was investigated for giving false testimony in several court cases and submitting scientifically flawed evidence in these cases. These events led to the validity of the pubic hair evidence being disputed in Duckett's case and raised doubts over the grounds of his murder conviction.

On the other hand, the prosecution and police investigators who handled Duckett's case affirmed that Duckett was the real killer of McAbee. State prosecutor Stephen Hurm pointed out that the tire marks were distinct and could only be left behind by a police car whose model matched those of the Mascotte Police Department, and further tests matched the tire marks to Duckett's vehicle. During Duckett's trial, three teenage girls testified that Duckett offered them rides or made sexual advances toward them in the months before McAbee's murder.

Additionally, police investigations revealed the possibility of Duckett's involvement in other murders, specifically the unsolved deaths of Jeanifer Weldon and Ronette Lynn Peterson, which shared similarities with McAbee's murder. These revelations gave rise to suspicions that Duckett was possibly a serial killer. Frank, who also conducted research on the other murders linked to Duckett, later changed his mind and concluded that Duckett was guilty of the murders of McAbee and Weldon.

== First death warrant ==
On February 27, 2026, Florida Governor Ron DeSantis signed a death warrant for Duckett, scheduling his death sentence to be carried out on March 31, 2026.

Duckett was the fifth condemned inmate from Florida to have his execution scheduled in 2026, as well as one of three men slated to be executed in March 2026. The other two were Billy Leon Kearse (March 3, 2026), who was convicted of the 1991 murder of Fort Pierce police officer Danny Parrish, and Michael Lee King (March 17, 2026), who was convicted of the 2008 murder of Denise Amber Lee. Kearse and King have been executed as scheduled.

On March 6, 2026, Lake County Circuit Judge Brian Welke granted the request from Duckett's defence counsel to proceed with post-conviction DNA testing.

On March 26, 2026, the Florida Supreme Court halted Duckett's execution pending the completion of DNA testing.

On March 27, 2026, the testing results came out, which were inconclusive. Alongside the results, Deputy Director of Forensic Sciences at the Florida Department of Law Enforcement recommended additional testing be completed. Despite this, Attorney-General James Uthmeier filed a motion to the Florida Supreme Court to lift the stay of execution, given the fact that "the testing was completed and the results did not exonerate Duckett of Teresa McAbee's murder." Duckett's counsel opposed the motion and filed a request to allow for the additional testing recommended by the state's expert. As of March 29, the Florida Supreme Court had not ruled. The death warrant for Duckett remained effective until April 7, 2026, making it possible for the execution to proceed if the court agreed to overturn the stay.

On March 30, 2026, the eve of Duckett's scheduled execution, the Florida Supreme Court denied the prosecution's request to lift the stay, and ordered a circuit Judge to analyze the DNA testing results and return with a report by April 2, 2026.

On April 1, 2026, Circuit Judge Brian Welke denied Duckett's application to further analyze the testing results, because it would not have exonerated Duckett. Welke was set to submit another report to the Florida Supreme Court and it was up to the Florida Supreme Court to decide whether to overturn the stay or not.

On April 7, Duckett's death warrant expired as he sought to appeal the ruling from the circuit court denying his motion for further DNA testing and review. When asked whether Governor DeSantis would sign another warrant to execute Duckett, Molly Best, a spokesperson for the governor said, "stay tuned."

On April 30, a month after he was supposed to be executed, the Florida Supreme Court issued a mandate that further analysis of Duckett's DNA results must be performed, reversing the circuit court's decision. Throughout the hearings prior to the decision, FDLE had stated further analysis of the results, which had come back inconclusive, could be further reviewed by a private laboratory. The director had suggested utilizing Othram, Inc. to review the results. The circuit judge had ruled against Duckett, stating that there was nothing further to review. In contrast, the Florida Supreme Court reversed the decision, also noting that should any dispute arise, an evidentiary hearing would be needed.

On June 22, 2026, a Lake County judge denied Duckett's request to hold a hearing for a review of the procedures and results of recent DNA testing conducted in his case.

On July 8, 2026, the Florida Supreme Court overturned the stay of execution, paving the way for the possibility of a new death warrant for Duckett.

== Second death warrant and execution ==
=== Re-scheduled execution date ===
On July 14, 2026, James Duckett was scheduled to be put to death by lethal injection on July 28, 2026. His death warrant was signed on the same day that Dennis Michael Sochor was executed for the 1981 rape and murder of Patricia Gifford in Fort Lauderdale, Florida.

Duckett was scheduled to be executed on the same day as 80-year-old Dominick Occhicone, who was convicted of murdering his girlfriend's parents, Raymond and Martha Artzner, in 1986 in Holiday, Florida. Duckett's execution was tentatively set for 12:00 p.m., six hours earlier than Occhicone's scheduled execution at 6:00 p.m. Both executions were carried out as planned, signifying Florida's first double execution in the modern era since capital punishment resumed in 1976. Prior to this, Florida historically conducted 32 documented double executions between 1924 and 1964, and its latest double execution occurred on May 12, 1964, when Emmett C. Blake and Sie Dawson were both executed for murder. Before this, the most recent U.S. state to carry out a double execution in one single day was Arkansas, when two convicted murderers – Jack Harold Jones and Marcel Wayne Williams – were executed on the same day on April 24, 2017.

=== Final appeals ===
On July 24, 2026, the Florida Supreme Court denied an appeal from Duckett to stay his execution. The dismissal of Duckett's appeal came three days after Occhicone also lost his appeal to the Florida Supreme Court, paving way for the double execution to proceed.

On July 24, 2026, defense attorneys for Duckett and Occhicone jointly filed a lawsuit to the U.S. District Court for the Northern District of Florida, seeking to overturn their execution dates. The lawyers argued that scheduling the executions of both men on the same date could constitute cruel and unusual punishment as it might cause them pain and suffering and likely violate the Eighth Amendment. They also argued that scheduling a double execution may increase the exponential risk of a botched execution due to reasons such as the risk of error in lethal injection procedures and the staff not being equipped to carry out two executions on the same day. U.S. District Judge T. Kent Wetherell II rejected the lawsuit, and the two men brought their case further to the 11th Circuit Court of Appeals, which denied the lawsuit on July 26, 2026.

At the same time, Duckett filed a separate appeal to the federal courts over the DNA testing matters. The appeal was denied by U.S. District Judge Jordan Pratt on July 27, 2026.

As a final recourse, Duckett filed a final appeal to the U.S. Supreme Court. On the date of his execution, Duckett's appeal was denied by the U.S. Supreme Court, and the ruling was made about half an hour after Duckett's scheduled execution timing of 12 pm, effectively delaying Duckett's execution by more than one hour.

=== Lethal injection ===
At 1:19 pm on July 28, 2026, 68-year-old James Aren Duckett was put to death by lethal injection in Florida State Prison. Duckett declined to make a final statement, saying "No sir" when prompted. Eighty-year-old Dominick Occhicone was executed five hours later, and he was pronounced dead at 6:13 pm, marking Florida's first double execution in 62 years since 1964, and the first in the United States since 2017. According to the Tampa Bay Times, Duckett received a final prison visit from four family members on the night before his scheduled execution, and on the day of his scheduled execution, Duckett woke up at 4:45am in his prison cell, and was served his last meal of eggs, grits, bacon, biscuits and chocolate milk and conversed with a spiritual adviser.

After the execution of Duckett, the family members of Teresa McAbee, whom Duckett killed back in 1987, stated that they had suffered for decades while waiting for justice to be served, and McAbee's mother broke down as she told the press that she waited for nearly 40 years to finally see Duckett executed, while one of McAbee's cousins expressed she was glad to see Duckett executed, and stated that Duckett "took advantage of his badge" when he murdered her cousin. McAbee's cousin additionally stated that Duckett got off too easy and should be executed with more pain like what McAbee suffered before her death, and it should not have taken about four decades for her aunt to witness justice. Apart from McAbee's family, the relatives of Jeanifer Weldon, one of the two suspected victims of Duckett, also came to witness his execution, and Weldon's sister stated that Duckett's execution gave them a measure of closure, and the families of both Weldon and McAbee had long supported one another throughout these years since Duckett's conviction. Bill Gladson, the state attorney who formerly handled the prosecution of Duckett, stated that there was no doubt that Duckett was indeed guilty of murdering McAbee, and described the execution as a "final administration of justice" for the victim and her loved ones.

When speaking about the double execution in an interview after it had been carried out, Governor Ron DeSantis said he did not take joy in authorizing the executions, describing the decision as a "weighty" one. DeSantis, whose second and final term was set to end in 2026, also defended the increase in executions during the final two years of his administration. He argued that the COVID-19 pandemic had delayed all executions in the United States, creating a backlog that needed to be addressed. He emphasized that his priority was to ensure justice was served and to provide closure for the families of victims murdered by inmates on the state's death row. At the same time, he expressed frustration over the lengthy amount of time it often took for death sentences to be carried out in Florida.

== Aftermath ==
The trial of Duckett was one of the most notable cases presided over by Jerry Lockett during his tenure as a circuit judge. Lockett also imposed the death penalty in six other cases. Lockett died in September 2013 at the age of 71.

Nearly two decades after Duckett murdered McAbee, his two-year-old grandson Trenton Duckett became the victim of a high-profile Amber Alert case in August 2006, and the boy's Korean-born mother Melinda Duckett committed suicide a month later following extensive media attention around her child's disappearance. The police had questioned Duckett over his grandson's case while in prison, and Duckett revealed that Melinda intended to visit Duckett in prison with Trenton on the weekend of the boy's disappearance. As of 2026, Trenton remains missing. When Duckett's death warrant was signed in 2026, Joshua told the Orlando Sentinel that he was still searching for his son nearly two decades since Trenton's disappearance, while he avoided talking about his father's crime and scheduled execution.

In 2014, Duckett appeared in Death Row Stories, a true-crime original series produced by CNN. The case was also covered in true crime shows Real Detective and Killer in Question.

== See also ==
- Capital punishment in Florida
- List of people executed in Florida
- List of law enforcement officers convicted of an on-duty killing in the United States
- List of people executed in the United States in 2026

Executions carried out in Florida
Preceded by Dennis Michael Sochor July 14, 2026	James Aren Duckett; July 28, 2026	Succeeded by Dominick Anthony Occhicone Jr. July 28, 2026
Executions carried out in the United States
Preceded by Dennis Michael Sochor – Florida July 14, 2026	James Aren Duckett – Florida; July 28, 2026	Succeeded by Dominick Anthony Occhicone Jr. – Florida July 28, 2026
