= Catherine N. Duckett =

American entomologist

Catherine N. Duckett (born 1961) is the Associate Dean of the School of Science at Monmouth University. Formerly she worked as Associate Director of the Office for the Promotion of Women in Science, Engineering and Mathematics, and the Program Manager of the Ocean Biogeographic Information System at Rutgers University, as well as a former Associate professor of Biology at University of Puerto Rico at Rio Piedras. She is also a prominent systematic entomologist, specializing in the phylogeny of flea beetles, and an adjunct professor at Rutgers.

== Research ==
Duckett works primarily in systematics, the study of biological diversity and its classification. This involves analyzing the genetic relationship between species and the description and documentation of new taxonomic and morphological features. She works on the taxonomy and systematics of the Chrysomelidae or the leaf beetle, with a focus on the phylogeny of flea beetles (Alticini: Galerucinae). In the past she has focused on the Oedionychines (like Alagoasa aurora) with Karl Kjer at Rutgers. Besides phylogeny, she is interested in the evolution of mimicry, evolution of larval morphologies, and host-plant use patterns. She and her collaborators have described seven different species of Flea beetle and one new genus (Etapocanga) as new to science,. Duckett and collaborators have also described the first immatures known in three genera including Ivalia Jacoby.

Duckett and collaborators have also published systematic hypotheses about the evolution of Chrysomelidae, and flea beetles as listed on her curriculum vitae.

== Women's studies ==
Duckett worked alongside Joan W. Bennett at the Office for the Promotion of Women in Science, Engineering and Mathematics at Rutgers University. The organization is unique in its online catalog of influential women scientists and researchers from fields spanning from physics to anthropology. Notably, the site includes a "my story" section, where the women have submitted biographies including both personal anecdotes and their career histories. Duckett's own story is posted. She currently co-directs the women in science and mathematics program at Monmouth University.

== Awards ==
-1996 & 2002, "Who’s Who Among America’s Teachers."

-1999, Universidad de Puerto Rico Recinto de Río Piedras, “Reconocimiento por Excelencia Académica y Productividad”.

-1989-1990, Fulbright-Hays Fellowship to Venezuela to conduct field and museum studies.

== Education ==
-1987-1993, Cornell University, Ithaca, New York., Ph.D. Entomology.

-1985-1987, University of Texas at Austin, Austin, Texas, M.A. Biology.

-1979-1983, Brown University, Providence, Rhode Island, B.A. with Honors.
