= Murder of Danny Parrish =

1991 murder of a Fort Pierce police officer in Florida

- Danny Parrish, the police officer shot by Kearse in 1991
- Location: Fort Pierce, Florida, United States
- Date: January 18, 1991
- Attack type: Murder by shooting
- Motive: To avoid arrest
- Verdict: Guilty
- Convictions: First-degree murder
- Sentence: Death (November 8, 1991)
- Convicted: Billy Leon Kearse

On January 18, 1991, in Fort Pierce, Florida, United States, 29-year-old police sergeant Danny Thomas Parrish (October 4, 1961 – January 18, 1991) was shot and killed by 18-year-old Billy Leon Kearse (October 26, 1972 – March 3, 2026), who was stopped by Parrish for driving the wrong way down a one-way street. In an attempt to avoid arrest, Kearse put up a struggle with Sergeant Parrish and grabbed his gun, before shooting the police officer 13 times, leading to his death. Kearse was found guilty of murdering Sergeant Parrish and sentenced to death on November 8, 1991. Kearse was executed on March 3, 2026, 35 years after he murdered the officer.

== Murder ==
On January 18, 1991, in Fort Pierce, Florida, a police officer was shot and murdered in midst of a traffic stop.

The victim, 29-year-old police sergeant Danny Parrish, encountered 18-year-old Billy Leon Kearse, who was seen driving in the wrong direction at a one-way street. Sergeant Parrish stopped Kearse from driving his vehicle, and asked Kearse to give his name. Kearse, who did not have a drivers license, made up several fake aliases and gave them to Sergeant Parrish, although there were no individuals with those names in the list of the drivers' license history. Sergeant Parrish asked Kearse to come out of the car and proceeded to attempt to arrest him.

However, before he could handcuff Kearse, Sergeant Parrish got into a scuffle with Kearse, who was resisting arrest. During the struggle between both men, Kearse managed to snatch Sergeant Parrish's gun from his belt, and proceeded to shoot Sergeant Parrish 13 times. After the shooting, Kearse escaped the crime scene by driving off in his car, leaving Sergeant Parrish for dead on the ground. At that time, Kearse was out on probation for an unrelated offense and fearing he would be arrested for violating his probation, Kearse thus shot and killed the police officer.

An autopsy report showed that Sergeant Parrish sustained nine gunshot wounds on his body, and a further four shots hit his bulletproof vest. Sergeant Parrish was pronounced dead after he was rushed to a hospital.

The shooting was witnessed by a taxi driver, who heard the gunshot sounds, and the same witness also testified that he saw an African-American man (later identified as Kearse) driving a dark blue car away from nearby the crime scene. Kearse was eventually arrested after the police traced him to the address registered under his car registration number.

Background information of Sergeant Parrish revealed that he graduated from Fort Pierce Central High School in 1980, and before joining the police force, Sergeant Parrish had previously served three years in the U.S. Army and was a member of the Florida National Guard. Upon enlisting into the police force, Sergeant Parrish first became a reserve police officer for two years before he became a full-time road patrol officer in 1988. Sergeant Parrish was not the only member of his family who became a police officer; his half-brother was a Fellsmere police officer for four years at the time of his death. Sergeant Parrish was also married but did not have any children.

The funeral of Sergeant Parrish took place on January 22, 1991, and many law enforcement officers and friends, as well as Sergeant Parrish's widow and parents, were present at the funeral. Florida Governor Lawton Chiles also attended Sergeant Parrish's funeral and paid respects to the fallen officer's bereaved family. Many members of the local community also offered condolences through phone calls to the police station, and flags were flying half-mast at the police department.

== Charges ==
On January 20, 1991, Billy Kearse was charged with the first-degree murder of Sergeant Danny Parrish. Veteran lawyer Robert Udell was assigned to represent Kearse in his upcoming trial.

On February 5, 1991, Kearse was formally indicted by a grand jury for first-degree murder.

On May 8, 1991, Kearse was again indicted by a grand jury for first-degree murder, this time under a newly enacted statute. The amended law authorized a sentence of either death or life imprisonment without the possibility of parole if convicted of first-degree murder of a law enforcement officer. This differed from the standard sentencing framework, which permitted either the death penalty or life imprisonment with eligibility for parole after a minimum of 25 years.

In June 1991, Kearse appealed to challenge the new law. Kearse argued that the new law was unconstitutional, because the mandatory minimum sentence of life without parole for the first-degree murder of a police officer directly contrasted the minimum sentence of life with parole after 25 years for first-degree murder cases where the victim was not a police officer, and it unfairly treated the victims and offenders differently. In rebuttal, Assistant State Attorney David Morgan argued that the law was already upheld as constitutional and the state Legislature had the authority to impose harsher penalties for crimes against police officers.

== Perpetrator ==
Billy Leon Kearse
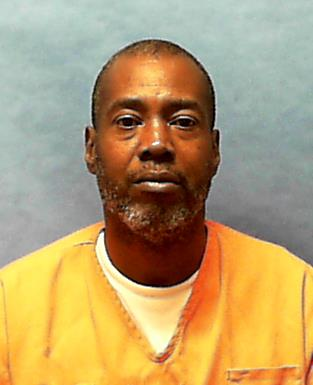
- FDC mugshot of Kearse
- Born: October 26, 1972; St. Lucie County, Florida, U.S.
- Died: March 3, 2026 (aged 53); Florida State Prison, Florida, U.S
- Status: Executed by lethal injection
- Conviction: Capital murder
- Penalty: Death (November 8, 1991)

Details
- Victims: Danny Thomas Parrish
- Date: January 18, 1991
- Country: United States
- State: Florida
- Location: Fort Pierce

Billy Leon Kearse was born on October 26, 1972. His childhood was marked by severe neglect and emotional disturbance, according to teachers, counselors, and psychologists. He was frequently hungry, poorly clothed, and absent from school, and he repeatedly ran away, telling authorities he felt safer in detention than at home. His mother worked long hours and was largely absent, and testimony indicated she drank heavily during pregnancy. Kearse suffered a head injury as a toddler and was later placed in special education programs for emotionally handicapped and severely disturbed children. Kearse dropped out of school after he completed the eighth grade.

Kearse had extensive prior contact with the juvenile justice system before the killing of Officer Danny Parrish, though his record showed little history of violence. According to court records cited by the Fort Pierce Tribune, his first police encounter occurred in 1981 at age eight for being "beyond control." That year he was also arrested for petty theft, and by age ten his record included additional petty theft arrests and a burglary charge.

As a juvenile, Kearse accumulated numerous arrests, largely for nonviolent, property-related offenses such as burglary, theft, criminal mischief, trespassing, and auto theft. Several cases were dismissed, and in at least six instances he was handled through Florida's Department of Health and Rehabilitative Services rather than incarceration.

In October 1988, after escaping a detention center, Kearse was placed on community control. His most serious charges came in October 1989, when he was arrested for burglary of a car and possession of burglary tools. In February 1990, he was sentenced to four years in prison followed by probation. He had recently been released and was on probation at the time of the traffic stop preceding Officer Parrish's death.

== Legal proceedings ==
=== Trial ===
In early October 1991, Kearse stood trial before a Vero Beach jury, and jury selection took place that same month.

On October 22, 1991, Kearse was found guilty of the first-degree murder of Sergeant Danny Parrish.

During the sentencing phase, the defence attempted to seek mercy on account of Kearse's troubled childhood and called on witnesses to testify about this. Psychological testing also suggested that Kearse suffered from possible brain damage, low intellectual functioning, and significant emotional impairment, caused by the childhood neglect and the alcohol abuse by Kearse's mother during her pregnancy.

On October 24, 1991, by a majority vote of 11–1, the jury recommended the death penalty for Kearse. Parrish's 25-year-old widow, Mirtha, agreed with the verdict, stating that Kearse deserved the death penalty for murdering her late husband. Similarly, both Parrish's sister and mother condemned Kearse and wanted him to receive the death sentence.

On November 8, 1991, Kearse was formally sentenced to death via the electric chair by Circuit Judge Marc Cianca. The judge found that the death penalty was appropriate because the crime was premeditated and also particularly "heinous, atrocious and cruel", and that Kearse demonstrated both "conscious and total indifference to the victim."

=== First appeal and re-sentencing ===
On December 4, 1993, Kearse filed an appeal to the Florida Supreme Court.

On June 22, 1995, the Florida Supreme Court allowed Kearse's appeal, vacating his death sentence and ordered a re-sentencing trial.

By July 1996, the prosecution planned to once again seek the death penalty for Kearse in his re-sentencing trial.

On December 19, 1996, a second jury unanimously voted to re-impose the death penalty for Kearse.

On March 24, 1997, Senior Circuit Judge C. Pfeiffer Trowbridge re-sentenced Kearse to death for the first-degree murder of Sergeant Parrish.

=== Death row and further appeals ===
On January 7, 1999, Kearse once again appealed to the Florida Supreme Court and his counsel argued that he did not deserve the death sentence.

On June 29, 2000, the Florida Supreme Court dismissed Kearse's appeal against his death sentence.

On August 30, 2007, the Florida Supreme Court rejected Kearse's appeal.

On August 30, 2018, Kearse's appeal for re-sentencing was denied by the Florida Supreme Court.

As of 2018, of all the 347 inmates on Florida's death row, Kearse was among the 12 prisoners in the list who were convicted of murders on the Treasure Coast. By 2024, Kearse was one of seven death row inmates convicted of crimes on the Treasure Coast.

=== Execution ===
On January 29, 2026, Governor Ron DeSantis signed a death warrant for Kearse, ordering his death sentence to be carried out on March 3, 2026.

Kearse was the third death row inmate in Florida to be scheduled for execution that same year. Two other condemned prisoners, Ronald Palmer Heath and Melvin Trotter, were also scheduled to be executed on February 10 and February 24, 2026, respectively. Heath was found guilty of the 1989 murder of Michael Sheridan, while Trotter was convicted of the 1986 murder of Virgie Langford. Both of them were since executed as scheduled.

On February 16, 2026, Kearse filed an appeal to the Florida Supreme Court and argued against the constitutionality of his death sentence. The appeal was eventually rejected.

On March 3, 2026, Kearse was put to death by lethal injection in the Florida State Prison at 6:24pm. In his final statement, he said that all he could do was ask for forgiveness from the Parrish family. In the hours before his execution, he refused to eat his last meal but accepted a visitor.

== Aftermath ==
In 2021, 30 years after the murder of Parrish, a life-size bronze sculpture resembling him was erected at the Fort Pierce police station to commemorate him.

== See also ==
- Capital punishment in Florida
- List of people executed in Florida
- List of people executed in the United States in 2026

Executions carried out in Florida
Preceded by Melvin Lee Trotter February 24, 2026	Billy Leon Kearse; March 3, 2026	Succeeded by Michael Lee King March 17, 2026
Executions carried out in the United States
Preceded by Melvin Lee Trotter – Florida February 24, 2026	Billy Leon Kearse – Florida; March 3, 2026	Succeeded by Cedric Allen Ricks – Texas March 11, 2026
