= Nancy Grace (TV program) =

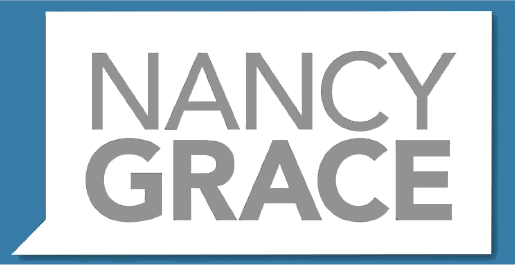
- Starring: Nancy Grace
- Country of origin: United States

Production
- Producer: Rupa Mikkilineni
- Running time: 60 minutes

Original release
- Network: HLN
- Release: February 21, 2005 – October 13, 2016

Related
- Primetime Justice with Ashleigh Banfield

Nancy Grace is an American current affairs program hosted by legal commentator Nancy Grace that aired Monday through Thursday nights between February 2, 2005, and October 13, 2016, on HLN. On June 30, 2016, Nancy Grace announced she would be leaving HLN in October, and the final episode aired on October 13, when her contract ended. The show was replaced with Primetime Justice with Ashleigh Banfield, which premiered on October 17.

== Controversies ==
Grace's comments on the show have garnered significant controversy, most significantly involving the Duke lacrosse case, the suicide of interviewee Melinda Duckett, and the death of Caylee Anthony.

== Guest hosts ==
When Grace was absent from the show (for family reasons, or during her run on cycle 13 of Dancing with the Stars for training, for instance), other CNN hosts substituted for her. Usually the substitute was In Session anchor Jean Casarez, Jane Velez-Mitchell, or Inside Edition correspondent Rita Cosby, although Sam Champion from Good Morning America and Pat Lalama also hosted the program.

== See also ==
- Jane Velez-Mitchell (TV program)
