= Dusty Spencer =

American convicted murderer (1952–2026)

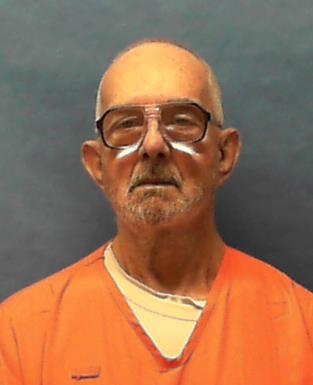
- FDOC mugshot
- Born: February 13, 1952; Pennsylvania, U.S.
- Died: June 25, 2026 (aged 74); Florida State Prison, Florida, U.S.
- Status: Executed by lethal injection
- Convictions: First degree murder Aggravated assault Attempted murder Aggravated battery
- Penalty: Death

Details
- Victims: 1
- Date: January 18, 1992
- Country: United States
- State: Florida
- Location: Orange County, Florida
- Date apprehended: January 20, 1992
- Imprisoned at: Florida State Prison

Dusty Ray Spencer (February 13, 1952 – June 25, 2026) was an American prisoner convicted of murdering his wife in Orange County, Florida. On January 18, 1992, Spencer, who had previously been arrested in December 1991 for domestic violence, fatally stabbed his wife, 40-year-old Karen Spencer. Spencer went on the run before he was arrested days after the murder. Spencer was convicted of Karen's murder, and sentenced to death and executed on June 25, 2026, at the age of 74.

== Personal life ==
Born in Pennsylvania on February 13, 1952, Dusty Ray Spencer completed his high school education at the Hopewell Area High School and graduated in 1970, and served in the United States Marine Corps for three years before being discharged in 1973. After leaving the military, Spencer moved to Florida and married his first wife. Within four years, he was arrested for delivering $1,600 worth of marijuana to an undercover drug agent. While awaiting the outcome of his case, Spencer attended Valencia Community College for nearly two years, earning a 3.5 grade point average. He later pleaded guilty and served approximately 10 months in jail. Following his release, Spencer divorced his first wife and, in 1980, restarted his career as a house painter, living frugally in a converted trailer while saving toward his goal of financial security and early retirement.

In 1988, Spencer met his second wife, Karen Spencer, after she hired him to paint her home. The two began dating, and Spencer admired Karen's independence, business skills, and determination in raising her three sons alone. They married on February 11, 1989, and became both life and business partners, jointly building A-Plus Painting into a successful company that earned more than $200,000 in 1990. The couple's marriage started off as a happy one, but eventually, the economic recession placed increasing strain on both their business and their marriage, and by late 1990, the financial issues led to frequent disputes between Spencer and Karen, up until early December 1991, when Karen asked for a divorce and told her husband to move out of their Orlando, Florida, house, which marked the preceding event that led to her murder in January 1992.

== Murder of Karen Spencer ==
On December 10, 1991, Dusty and Karen Spencer argued about the latter's withdrawal of money from the company's bank account. The argument escalated into violence, with Spencer choking and hitting Karen and threatening outright that he would kill her. Spencer was arrested and charged with spousal abuse as a result of this incident, and while he was detained in jail, Spencer called his wife and warned her that he would finish what he had started.

Subsequently, Spencer was released after the judge granted him bail at an amount of $5,000. Although Karen initially asked Spencer to come home for the holiday season, she reiterated that her husband should move out after Christmas. On January 1, 1992, during a drinking session, Spencer reportedly told a friend that he wanted to throw Karen overboard once he took her out on boat, although he told the same friend two days later that his wife would not go on the boat with him. On January 4, 1992, despite Karen filing the injunction to prevent him from coming back to their house, Spencer entered the house and assaulted Karen, and while Spencer's younger stepson tried to intervene, he was hit with an iron by his stepfather. Spencer fled the house after the assault, and Karen would seek treatment for her injuries, which she told the doctor were caused by an iron.

On the morning of January 18, 1992, two weeks after the attack, Spencer once again returned to the house to attack Karen, which ultimately turned out to be fatal. Spencer used a brick to hit Karen on the head several times, and the commotion awakened and alerted his 17-year-old stepson, who witnessed the attack and in response, the youth grabbed a rifle from his mother's bedroom and tried to shoot at his stepfather, but it jammed. The boy then struck Spencer's head with the gun, but Spencer persisted and slammed Karen's head onto the concrete wall of the house. Although the boy tried to carry his mother to safety, he was forced to leave his mother behind and escaped the house to seek help after Spencer came after them with a knife and threatened him. Karen was stabbed several times by Spencer, and she died as a result.

By the time the police and Karen's son arrived at the house, Spencer had already escaped the residence. According to an autopsy report, Karen died due to two stab wounds that penetrated her heart and lung. She was stabbed four or five times in the chest, had cuts on her face and arms, and severe blunt force trauma to her head. The wounds on her arms were certified to be defensive injuries, suggesting that Karen tried to defend herself when Spencer attacked and stabbed her.

== Aftermath ==
In the aftermath of Karen Spencer's murder, there were concerns regarding the systematic flaws that indirectly led to her murder, including the protective measures aimed to safeguard victims of domestic violence, due to Dusty Spencer's attempts on Karen's life while put on bail even after he was arrested and charged with spousal abuse.

As a result of the case, many judges barred suspects charged with domestic abuse from getting bail, and a no-bail policy was proposed to better protect the victims and prevent potential cases of these suspects retaliating against their victims while on bail. During the following years after Karen's murder, the Florida Legislature also passed stricter laws and legalized harsher penalties for domestic abuse cases, and these changes include criminalizing the threats of violence as a first-degree misdemeanor, the mandatory requirement for suspects of domestic violence cases to make their first appearance in court before they could be reviewed for bail, and law enforcement agencies were also required to explain why an arrest was not made in domestic abuse cases.

By 2001, judges who oversaw bail hearings held for suspects of domestic abuse cases continued to follow a stricter standard to ensure if these suspects were suitable for bail, such as setting higher bail amounts and electronically monitor the whereabouts of these suspects while they were out on bail.

== Arrest ==
On January 20, 1992, two days after the murder of his wife, Dusty Spencer was arrested after Polk County deputies traced his whereabouts to the house of one of his friends, where he sought refuge while on the run for the killing.

After his arrest, Spencer was charged with first-degree murder for the death of Karen, and he was held without bond at the Orange County jail.

On February 6, 1992, an Orange County grand jury formally indicted Spencer for his wife's murder and attempted murder of her younger son, as well as aggravated battery and attempted murder for the January 4, 1992, attack on Karen and her younger son.

In September 1992, the trial of Spencer was delayed for the prosecution to correct an error in their indictment documents. In the papers, the cause of Karen's death was wrongly listed as "blunt force trauma" instead of fatal stab wounds, and the prosecution managed to uncover the error, which could potentially led to the acquittal of Spencer had it gone unnoticed before the start of trial. The prosecution was later granted time to amend their indictment papers and delayed the first day of Spencer's trial from its original October date until November 2, 1992.

== Murder trial ==
On November 2, 1992, Dusty Spencer officially stood trial for the murder of Karen Spencer, and jury selection was conducted on that same day. A day later, a 12-member jury was assembled to try the case of Spencer in court.

During the trial, Karen's younger son appeared as a witness and testified in court about the fatal attack on his mother, and how he fruitlessly tried to intervene and stop his stepfather from killing his mother. A friend of Spencer testified that two weeks before the murder, he heard Spencer saying during a drinking session that he wanted to throw his wife overboard from a boat, and he believed that Spencer was joking and thus did not take the chilling comment seriously.

On November 7, 1992, after less than four hours of deliberation, the jury found Spencer guilty of the first-degree murder of his wife. State prosecutor Dorothy Sedgwick intended to seek the death penalty for Spencer, who faced a potential death sentence or life sentence for the charge of first-degree murder.

A sentencing trial was held on December 8, 1992. During the hearing, the prosecution sought the death penalty for Spencer, centering their arguments around the brutality of the killing and the prior assaults on Karen, while the defense asked for mercy on the basis that Spencer was under extreme emotional distress and his inability to control his emotions drove him into committing the murder. Ohio psychologist Katherine Burch, who examined Spencer, testified that Spencer was extremely paranoid and suffered from diminished responsibility and ability to reasoning due to chronic alcohol abuse.

On December 9, 1992, by a majority vote of 7–5, the jury recommended that Spencer should be sentenced to death for murdering his wife.

On December 21, 1992, Orange Circuit Judge Belvin Perry formally sentenced Spencer to death, and he was transferred to death row at the Union Correctional Institution.

== Re-sentencing and appeals ==
On September 22, 1994, the Florida Supreme Court allowed Spencer's appeal and overturned his death sentence by a majority vote, ordering the case to be remitted back to the trial court for re-sentencing. The majority decision, signed by Justices Leander Shaw, Major Harding and Parker Lee McDonald, stated that the murder of Karen Spencer was not especially cold, premeditated or abhorrent and that the trial judge should place more due consideration on the defendant's mental state in deciding the sentence and reconsider the severity of punishment. As for the minority that dissented, Justices Stephen Grimes and Ben Overton agreed that the murder was cold-blooded and should warrant the death penalty, while a third judge, Justice Gerald Kogan, believed that Spencer's sentence should be commuted to life imprisonment since his case was not as heinous as the other cases deserving of capital punishment.

On January 18, 1995, Spencer was once again sentenced to death by Orange Circuit Judge Belvin Perry, who found that the aggravating factors, including Spencer's history of violence towards Karen and the cruelty of the killing, were sufficient to justify the imposition of a death sentence even if taking into consideration both Spencer's background and mental state at the time of the crime.

On September 12, 1996, Spencer's direct appeal against his second death sentence was denied by the Florida Supreme Court.

On April 11, 2002, the Florida Supreme Court turned down Spencer's post-conviction petition and upheld his death sentence.

On June 22, 2010, Spencer's federal appeal was dismissed by the 11th Circuit Court of Appeals.

On January 24, 2011, the U.S. Supreme Court dismissed Spencer's final appeal against his death sentence.

In 2016, the state of Florida amended their laws to allow death sentences to be imposed only based on unanimous jury votes, and Spencer appealed to have his death sentence overturned in favour of re-sentencing because his sentence was imposed by a non-unanimous vote of 7–5, which was the minimum number required under Florida's previous law to sentence a person to death. On March 17, 2017, the prosecution filed litigation to uphold the death sentence of Spencer. Ultimately, on November 8, 2018, the Florida Supreme Court denied Spencer's plea for re-sentencing, because the new changes cannot retroactively apply in his case, since his sentence was finalized and his avenue of direct appeals were all exhausted before 2002.

== Execution ==
On May 26, 2026, Florida Governor Ron DeSantis signed a death warrant for Dusty Spencer, scheduling him to be executed on June 25, 2026.

On June 10, 2026, Spencer filed an appeal to the Florida Supreme Court. On June 18, 2026, the Florida Supreme Court rejected Spencer's last-minute appeal against his death sentence.

During the final days leading up to his execution, advocates argued for the state to spare Spencer's life. They raised the fact that Spencer was 74 years old and was in poor health at this point, suffering from cognitive decline, heart problems and cirrhosis and other health issues, and he could no longer pose as a threat to anyone, and it was therefore inappropriate to execute him. Since 1976, only 12 inmates aged 74 and above were executed of all the 1,669 people put to death in the United States.

As a final resort to avoid his execution, Spencer filed a final appeal to the U.S. Supreme Court against his death sentence, and his lawyers brought up his health issues in their submissions against the death sentence, citing that by administering the lethal injection drugs, which could potentially had repercussions when interacting with Spencer's liver condition, it would be constituted as "cruel and unusual punishment". They also argued that there was evidence that the state had possibly used insufficient, expired or incorrect drugs in previous executions and urged the court to intervene in this case. However, the appeal was denied by the U.S. Supreme Court on the afternoon of June 25, 2026, hours before he was due to be executed.

On June 25, 2026, 74-year-old Dusty Ray Spencer was put to death by lethal injection at the Florida State Prison. For his last meal, Spencer ordered a pizza, french fries and a milkshake, and in his final statement, Spencer said, "Sorry, sorry to the family. Into thy hands I commit my spirit and my soul. I'm on my way, Lord. I'm on my way. Amen." Spencer was pronounced dead at 6:10 pm, within ten minutes of the drugs being administered.

Given his age of 74, Spencer became the oldest person executed in the state since 1924, surpassing both Samuel Lee Smithers and R. Charlie Gifford, who were both executed for murder at age 72 in 2025 and 1951 respectively. Despite Spencer becoming the oldest person to be executed at that point in Florida, another 74-year-old Florida prisoner, Dennis Michael Sochor, was executed three weeks later on July 14, 2026. Sochor was nine days older than Spencer at the time of his execution, surpassing Spencer's record. Another inmate, Dominick Anthony Occhicone Jr., was executed on July 28, 2026, and surpassed both Spencer and Sochor's record at the age of 80.

== See also ==
- Capital punishment in Florida
- List of people executed in Florida
- List of people executed in the United States in 2026

Executions carried out in Florida
Preceded by Andrew Richard Lukehart June 2, 2026	Dusty Ray Spencer; June 25, 2026	Succeeded by Dennis Michael Sochor July 14, 2026
Executions carried out in the United States
Preceded by Andrew Richard Lukehart – Florida June 2, 2026	Dusty Ray Spencer – Florida; June 25, 2026	Succeeded by Dennis Michael Sochor – Florida July 14, 2026
