= Thomas Duckett Junior =

Thomas Duckett Junior (1840 – 1868) was an English sculptor.

Born in Westmoreland, he learned his trade under his father Thomas Duckett Senior and also studied in Rome and under Thomas Thornycroft. He had four addresses in London between 1861 and 1867 and exhibited once at the Royal Institution and six times at the Royal Academy of Arts.

Only one of his sculptures, Nymph Disturbed at the Bath from around 1866, is known to be in a British public collection, namely Towneley Hall Art Gallery, Lancashire. In search of a better climate to alleviate his pulmonary tuberculosis, he emigrated to Australia in 1866, dying there two years later. He had left his daughter and his pregnant wife behind in the UK; his wife predeceased him and so Duckett's two children were left in the care of his parents on his death.
