= Kevin Duckett =

Australian rugby league player

Playing information
- Position: Fullback
Club
Years	Team	Pld	T	G	FG	P
1986–87	St. George Dragons	4	0	0	0	0
1988	Eastern Suburbs	1	0	0	0	0
	Total	5	0	0	0	0

Kevin Duckett is a former Australian professional rugby league player. A fullback, he made a total of five NSWRL appearances during the 1980s. He played very briefly in four games for the St. George Dragons (1986–87) and played in one match for the Eastern Suburbs in 1988. In total, he played approximately 12 minutes of match time.
