= Richard Duckett =

Richard Duckett may refer to:

- Richard Louis Duckett (1885–1972), Canadian lacrosse player
- Richard Duckett (MP) for Westmorland (UK Parliament constituency)
- Dick Duckett (born 1933), American basketball player
