= Thomas Duckett Senior =

Thomas Duckett Senior or Thomas Duckett I (1804-1878) was an English sculptor

== Life ==
Born in Claughton, Wyre, he was apprenticed to a plasterer before working in Lancaster as a wood carver. Next he was employed by the sculpture firm Franceys and Spence in Liverpool then the architectural and sculptural firm of Francis Webster and Sons in Kendal.

He set up his own studio around 1844 in Preston, Lancashire, with tomb monuments and busts forming most of his output. That town commissioned a statue of Robert Peel from him in 1850, now in Winckley Square in the town, though he failed to win the competitions for Leeds' Wellington Monument and another Peel monument in Bolton, Lancashire. His works are well-represented in Preston's Harris Art Gallery.

He and his wife are both interred in the cemetery in New Hall Lane Cemetery, with a monument that has a head on each elevation, possibly carved or at least designed by Duckett himself. Their son Thomas Duckett Junior was also a sculptor.

== Bibliography ==
- Art Journal, 1878, pp. 169, 207
- D.A. Cross, Public Sculpture of Lancashire and Cumbria, Liverpool, 2017, pp. xi, 63, 107–08, 169
- C. Hartwell and N. Pevsner, Lancashire: North (The Buildings of England), New Haven and London, 2009, pp. 237, 240, 410, 468, 505, 523, 707
- K. Johnson, Preston through Time, Stroud, 2011, p. 76
- Preston Chronicle:
  - 6 September 1845
  - 22 November 1845
  - 15 April 1854
  - 9 January 1858
  - 11 June 1859
  - 21 January 1860
  - 12 March 1862
  - 19 March 1864
  - 1 April 1865
  - 19 March 1870
  - 16 February 1878
- I. Roscoe et al., A Biographical Dictionary of Sculptors in Britain 1660–1851, New Haven and London, 2009, pp. 378–79
- A. Taylor (ed. J. Martin), The Websters of Kendal. A Northwestern Dynasty, Kendal, 2004, pp. 51–52, 60
