= Death of Melinda Duckett =

2006 death in Florida, US

Melinda Duckett
- Born: Melinda Marie Eubank; August 14, 1985; South Korea
- Died: September 8, 2006 (aged 21); Lady Lake, Florida, US
- Cause of death: Suicide by gunshot
- Known for: Mother of missing child Trenton Duckett, and prime suspect in his disappearance

Melinda Marie Duckett (née Eubank; August 14, 1985 – September 8, 2006) was the Korean-born American mother of Trenton John Duckett, a 2-year-old boy who disappeared from his Leesburg, Florida, home on August 27, 2006. She attracted media attention when she committed suicide following an appearance on Nancy Grace. Duckett's family filed a wrongful death claim against Nancy Grace and CNN, alleging that the aggressive questioning traumatized Duckett and led to her suicide.

== Early life ==
Duckett was born in South Korea and moved to the United States on Christmas Eve of 1985, at the age of four months, after being adopted by an American couple. She lived in Lockport, New York until she was seventeen years old, when she moved to Florida to live with her adoptive grandparents. She attended South Sumter High School with Joshua Duckett, whom she began dating. Melinda became pregnant, and gave birth to Trenton in August 2004, shortly after graduating high school. She and Joshua married in July 2005. The relationship between Josh and Melinda Duckett was "tumultuous" and they separated numerous times before Melinda filed for divorce in July 2006. Joshua's father was James Aren Duckett, a former police officer convicted and sentenced to death for the murder of a young girl in 1987.

Melinda was involuntarily committed under the Baker Act in April 2005 after Joshua alleged that she had threatened to harm Trenton. She was diagnosed with obsessive-compulsive personality disorder in December 2005, but the report indicated there was "no psychological reason that would preclude Melinda from being a capable and loving parent."

Duckett worked for a lawn care company until she was laid off. She became a notary public on August 1, 2006.

== Disappearance of Trenton Duckett ==
Duckett reported her son missing on August 27, 2006. She told police that she went to check on Trenton in his bedroom after she had finished watching a film, and discovered that Trenton was gone and there was a cut in the window screen above the crib. According to police, she was considered the prime suspect in her son's disappearance but no arrests were made because they hoped she would lead them to Trenton.

== Death ==
Duckett was interviewed about Trenton's disappearance by Nancy Grace for a September 8, 2006, episode of Grace's television program. During the interview Grace accused Duckett of hiding something because Duckett refused to take a polygraph test and provided vague answers to questions. The day after the taping of the show, Duckett wrote a two-page letter addressed to "the public" expressing her love for Trenton and anger over being faced with "ridicule and criticism." After writing the letter, she committed suicide using her grandfather's shotgun.

== Lawsuit and aftermath ==
Duckett's family blamed her death on media scrutiny, particularly from Grace. They filed a wrongful death lawsuit against her, accusing Grace of inflicting emotional distress on Duckett. In an interview on Good Morning America, Nancy Grace said in reaction to events that "If anything, I would suggest that guilt made her commit suicide. To suggest that a 15- or 20-minute interview can cause someone to commit suicide is focusing on the wrong thing." She then said that, while she sympathized with the family, she knew from her own experience as a victim of crime that such people look for somebody else to blame.

On November 8, 2010, a month before the jury trial was scheduled to start, Grace reached a settlement with the estate of Melinda Duckett to create a $200,000 trust fund dedicated to locating Trenton. According to the agreement, had Trenton been found alive before he turned 13, the remaining proceeds in the trust would have been administered by a trustee, Trenton's great-aunt Kathleen Calvert, until he turned 18 and the funds would have been transferred for his use. If Trenton wasn't found alive by his 13th birthday, the funds were to be transferred to the National Center for Missing and Exploited Children. "We are pleased the lawsuit has been dismissed. The statement speaks for itself," a spokeswoman for CNN said. Jay Paul Deratany, a lawyer representing Duckett's family and estate, said in a statement sent to The Associated Press: "After four years of litigation and extensive discovery, the parties now agree that Nancy Grace, the producers of her program, and CNN engaged in no intentional wrongdoing in the course of dedicating a program to finding the missing toddler, as alleged in the lawsuit."

In March 2026, Joshua Duckett told the Orlando Sentinel that he was still searching for his son even after nearly two decades since Trenton's disappearance. In the interview he avoided talking about his father James Aren Duckett, who was scheduled to be executed for the 1987 murder-rape of an eleven-year-old girl. James Duckett's execution was carried out July 28, 2026.
