= Dominick Occhicone =

American convicted murderer (1945–2026)

Dominick Anthony Occhicone Jr.
- Occhicone after his arrest in 1986
- Born: August 29, 1945; Carmel, New York, U.S.
- Died: July 28, 2026 (aged 80); Florida State Prison, Raiford, Florida, U.S.
- Status: Executed by lethal injection
- Motive: Personal resentment at victims allegedly causing breakup of relationship with ex-girlfriend
- Conviction: First degree murder (x2)
- Penalty: Death (Note: The death sentence was imposed for the murder of Martha Artzner, while for the murder of Raymond Artzner, Occhicone received a life sentence.) (November 9, 1987)

Details
- Victims: 2
- Date: June 10, 1986
- Country: United States
- State: Florida
- Location: Holiday, Florida
- Date apprehended: June 10, 1986
- Imprisoned at: Union Correctional Institution (death row)

Dominick Anthony Occhicone Jr. (August 29, 1945 – July 28, 2026) was an American convicted murderer and death row inmate executed in Florida. Occhicone was convicted of the June 10, 1986, murders of Raymond and Martha Artzner, his ex-girlfriend's parents, in Holiday, Florida. Occhicone shot the elderly couple to death inside their house because he blamed them for causing the breakup between him and his former girlfriend. Occhicone was sentenced to death for the murder of Martha, as well as life imprisonment for the murder of Raymond. He was executed by lethal injection on July 28, 2026, and at 80 became the oldest inmate executed in the state of Florida.

== Early life ==
Dominick Anthony Occhicone Jr. was born on August 29, 1945, in a three-generation Italian-American family in Carmel, New York, where he grew up. Occhicone's father was an Italian immigrant who worked as a sanitary worker in New York City, and was known to be a gentle and family-oriented man. Although Occhicone had a stable upbringing, he displayed an explosive temper from an early age. As a teenager and young adult, he was frequently involved in fights, often returning home with injuries from barroom brawls.

During the Vietnam War period, Occhicone was drafted for war military service, but he did not report for his conscription and was therefore arrested and tried in a court martial, and served approximately two years in a military prison at Fort Dix, New Jersey. After release, he eventually moved with his family to Holiday, Florida, in 1977 following his parents' retirement.

Occhicone first married his wife Sharon in Florida, and the couple had a son. However, Sharon died of cancer when their son was two, and the boy was placed under the care of relatives. After losing his wife, Occhicone spent much of his time drinking in bars. His alcohol abuse reportedly intensified over the years. Before his marriage with Sharon, Occhicone had a brief relationship in the 1970s with a New York woman who became pregnant with their daughter, but Occhicone was unaware of this since they broke up at that point. His daughter was likewise unaware of her parentage until her mother accidentally revealed it in 2011, leading to Occhicone and his daughter meeting for the first time while he was incarcerated on death row for the 1986 murders of his ex-girlfriend's parents.

== Third relationship and murders ==
Prior to his 1986 arrest for murder, Dominick Occhicone dated his girlfriend Anita Gerrety for three years, and the couple stayed together with Gerrety's son and daughter and Occhicone's five-year-old son for about six months before they became engaged and planned to get married in 1985. However, two months before the scheduled wedding, Gerrety broke up with Occhicone due to his violent temper and acts, and Occhicone was reportedly abusive to her and the children, both verbally and physically.

Even after the end of the relationship, Occhicone continued to contact Gerrety and also sent her flowers. In May 1986, Gerrety told Occhicone that she already had an abortion, but refused to tell him the father of the baby, and also informed him that she had started afresh with another man. Occhicone continued to harass Gerrety. Simultaneously, Occhicone also harboured resentment toward her parents, 66-year-old Raymond Artzner and 62-year-old Martha Artzner, (Note: Some sources addressed her as Evelyn Artzner.) under the belief that they were the reason why he and his former girlfriend broke up. Occhicone went as far as to express his thought of killing Gerrety's parents in front of her, and threatened Gerrety that he would harm her family members.

On the early morning of June 10, 1986, in Holiday, Florida, Occhicone, then heavily drunk, arrived at the Artzners' home and knocked on the door, hoping to see and reconcile with Gerrety, but departed when she threatened to call the police. However, Occhicone later returned to the house armed with a handgun. He removed the phone lines before he knocked on the door, and when Raymond tried to call the police, he could not do so since the outside phone wires were disconnected.

Raymond came out with a broomstick to confront Occhicone and warned him to leave. In response, Occhicone wielded his gun, shot Raymond in the face, broke through a locked door, and chased Gerrety through the house, but Gerrety escaped the house with her daughter. Martha was also inside the house; Occhicone shot her four times, including thrice to the chest. She died on the scene. Raymond was taken to the hospital, and told police the identity of the shooter, but died from his gunshot injury at the hospital. Occhicone was arrested the same day and detained for the double murder.

== Charges and trial ==
On June 11, 1986, a day after his arrest, Dominick Occhicone was charged with two counts of murdering Martha and Raymond Artzner. On July 16, 1986, he was indicted by a Pasco County grand jury on two counts of first-degree murder.

During his 1987 trial, Occhicone admitted that he killed the Artzners, but claimed the shootings were not premeditated, and revealed his severe alcoholism. The defence also argued that Occhicone struggled with alcoholism, depression, and emotional distress caused by the separation from his former girlfriend, and therefore should not be held fully culpable for the murders. However, the defence did not call any witnesses to the stand to support their contention. The prosecution, on the other hand, contended that the shootings were cold and premediated, and also summoned Occhicone's ex-girlfriend and two more female witnesses, who all testified about the defendant's resentment towards the Artzners.

Later that same month, the jury found Occhicone guilty of the double murder, and during the penalty phase, the same jury recommended the death penalty for both counts of murder based on a 7–5 vote.

On November 9, 1987, the trial judge formally sentenced Occhicone to life imprisonment for killing Raymond, but for the other charge of murdering Martha, Occhicone was condemned to death by the judge.

== Appeals and death row ==
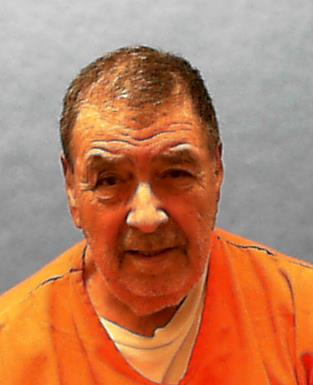
Mugshot of Occhicone

On October 11, 1990, the Florida Supreme Court rejected Dominick Occhicone's direct appeal against his death sentence. The following year, in 1991, the U.S. Supreme Court denied Occhicone's appeal against his death sentence.

On April 8, 1993, Occhicone's second appeal to the Florida Supreme Court was turned down.

On June 29, 2000, the Florida Supreme Court dismissed Occhicone's appeal against his death sentence.

On July 14, 2006, the 11th Circuit Court of Appeals denied Occhicone's appeal.

As of December 2007, Occhicone was one of seven death row inmates from Pasco County, and Occhicone was the oldest of the seven at 62 years old.

On January 30, 2018, in separate rulings, the Florida Supreme Court denied the petitions of Occhicone and nine other Florida death row convicts for re-sentencing. In all their cases, the court deemed that they were ineligible for re-sentencing under a new law because they exhausted their direct appeals and had their sentences finalized before 2002. This new law allowed the jury to sentence a defendant to death solely based on unanimous jury votes. However, this particular law was only in effect for five more years before it was changed in 2023 to allow a person to be sentenced to death when at least eight jurors voted for a death sentence.

As of May 2019, Occhicone was one of six inmates from Pasco County awaiting execution on Florida's death row.

Based on media sources and official records, as of June 2026, Occhicone was one of five oldest inmates on Florida's death row and they were all born in the year 1945. Occhicone was the second-to-youngest of these five, and the oldest of them was Daniel Burns Jr., (Note: Burns was born on January 29, 1945, seven months earlier than Occhicone (August 29, 1945).) who was sentenced for the murder of a state trooper in 1987.

== Execution ==
On June 26, 2026, Governor Ron DeSantis signed a death warrant for Dominick Occhicone, whose execution date was set a month later on July 28, 2026. Occhicone, who was 80 years old at this point, was the oldest inmate on Florida's death row to receive an execution order.

As Occhicone's execution drew near, it came to increasing public attention that in midst of the state's increasing rate of executions, Florida had scheduled the executions of three extremely old prisoners: Dusty Ray Spencer, Dennis Michael Sochor and Occhicone. Spencer and Sochor were each 74 years old, six years younger than Occhicone, who was expected to become the oldest inmate and the first octogenarian put to death in Florida, as well as the second-oldest in the United States, (Note: At the time of Occhicone's death warrant, the oldest person executed in the United States was 83-year-old Walter Moody, who was put to death by Alabama in 2018 for killing federal judge Robert Smith Vance and African-American civil-rights attorney Robert E. Robinson.) if his execution proceeded as scheduled. Spencer was executed for the 1992 murder of his wife on June 25, 2026, a day before Occhicone's death warrant was authorized by the governor, while Sochor was executed on July 14, 2026, for the 1982 rape and murder of 18-year-old Patricia Gifford, two weeks before Occhicone was due to be executed.

Advocates against capital punishment and religious figures called out Florida for scheduling the executions of very elderly prisoners, and stated that it was cruel and unusual punishment to execute frail and aging inmates who were weak and prone to dying naturally in prison. Some also alluded this issue to the prolonged appellate processes and systematic problems with the death penalty that caused the delay to the path of justice and indirectly perpetuated the increasingly ageing death row population who waited decades for their sentences to be carried out. In the case of Occhicone, he had suffered from multiple age-related health issues, including kidney and prostate problems, and even needed help with his daily tasks behind bars.

On July 8, 2026, Occhicone's lawyers filed a motion seeking a stay of execution, submitting that their client was too old and ill to be put to death, and stated that it was "cruel and unusual punishment" to execute a frail and ailing old man suffering from poor health, and that the rapid rate of executions in the state might psychologically impact the welfare of the corrections staff in charge of death row and executions.

On July 9, 2026, the Florida Court of Appeals denied the appeal of Occhicone for a stay.

On July 14, 2026, the same date when Sochor was put to death, another death row inmate named James Aren Duckett, (Note: This was the second time Duckett received his death warrant in 2026. He was originally set to be executed on March 31, 2026, but his execution was stayed due to legal issues and post-conviction DNA testing, and his stay was subsequently overturned by the Florida Supreme Court.) a former Mascotte police officer sentenced to death for raping and murdering an 11-year-old girl, was scheduled to be put to death on July 28, 2026, the same date as Occhicone, although the two men were slated to be executed six hours apart of each other based on the scheduled timings listed in their respective death warrants (12 noon for Duckett and 6 pm for Occhicone). It was the first double execution carried out on the same day in Florida since 1976. Throughout Florida's history, the state carried out a total of 32 double executions between 1924 and 1964. The most recent took place on May 12, 1964, when Emmett C. Blake and Sie Dawson were both executed after being convicted of murder. Before this, the most recent U.S. state to carry out a double execution in one single day was Arkansas, when two convicted murderers—Jack Harold Jones (Note: Jack Jones was a serial killer sentenced to death for the 1995 rape-murder of Mary Phillips in Arkansas, while he received a life sentence for raping and killing Lori Barrett in Florida. He was also posthumously identified as the real killer of Regina Harrison in Florida, a crime for which another man was wrongfully imprisoned.) and Marcel Wayne Williams (Note: Marcel Williams was sentenced to death for the 1994 kidnapping, rape and murder of Stacy Errickson.)—were executed on the same day in April 2017.

On July 21, 2026, the Florida Supreme Court dismissed Occhicone's appeal to stave off his execution. Similarly, the Florida Supreme Court rejected Duckett's request for a stay of execution three days later, paving way for the pair's executions to proceed.

On July 24, 2026, the defence counsels of both Duckett and Occhicone jointly filed a lawsuit to the U.S. District Court for the Northern District of Florida, seeking to overturn their execution dates. The lawyers argued that scheduling the executions of both men on the same date could potentially constitute as cruel and unusual punishment as it might cause them pain and suffering and likely violate the Eighth Amendment. They also argued that scheduling a double execution may potentially increase the exponential risk of a botched execution due to reasons such as the risk of error in lethal injection procedures and the staff not being equipped to carry out two executions on the same day. U.S. District Judge T. Kent Wetherell II rejected the lawsuit, and the two men brought their case further to the 11th Circuit Court of Appeals, which denied the lawsuit on July 26, 2026.

On July 25, 2026, Occhicone filed a final appeal to the U.S. Supreme Court. However, the appeal was rejected several hours before Occhicone's execution proceeded.

At 6:13 pm on July 28, 2026, 80-year-old Dominick Anthony Occhicone Jr. was put to death by lethal injection in Florida State Prison. His execution was carried out five hours after Duckett was executed in the same prison at 1:19 pm, marking Florida's first double execution in 62 years and the first in the United States since 2017. Occhicone also became the oldest prisoner executed in Florida at age 80. According to the Tampa Bay Times, Occhicone received a final prison visit from his daughter on the eve of his scheduled execution, and on the day of his scheduled execution, Occhicone woke up at 4:45am in his prison cell, and was served his last meal of eggplant parmesan, garlic bread, salad and a Pepsi. In his final statement before his execution, Occhicone apologized to the families of his victims and stated he never meant to do what he did 40 years ago.

When speaking about the double execution in an interview after it had been carried out, Governor DeSantis said he did not take joy in authorizing the executions, describing the decision as a "weighty" one. DeSantis, whose second and final term is set to end in January 2027, also defended the increase in executions during the final two years of his administration. He argued that the COVID-19 pandemic had delayed all executions in the United States, creating a backlog that needed to be addressed. He emphasized that his priority was to ensure justice was served and to provide closure for the families of victims murdered by inmates on the state's death row. At the same time, he expressed frustration over the lengthy amount of time it often took for death sentences to be carried out in Florida. The Artzner family released a media statement, expressing that they had endured "40 years of sleepless nights, missed birthdays and lost conversations", and the execution of Occhicone signaled the conclusion of a chapter in their lives, even though it could not erase the pain they suffered from losing Raymond and Martha Artzner.

== See also ==
- Capital punishment in Florida
- List of people executed in the United States in 2026
- List of people executed in Florida

Executions carried out in Florida
Preceded by James Aren Duckett July 28, 2026	Dominick Anthony Occhicone Jr. July 28, 2026	Succeeded by William Frances Silvia Jr. August 18, 2026
Executions carried out in the United States
Preceded by James Aren Duckett – Florida July 28, 2026	Dominick Anthony Occhicone Jr. – Florida; July 28, 2026	Succeeded by Carlos Cuesta-Rodriguez – Oklahoma August 13, 2026
