= Karl Kjer =

American entomologist (born 1959)

Karl M. Kjer (born November 19, 1959) is an American entomologist, taxonomist, and molecular biologist.

== Background ==
In 1992, Kjer received his Ph.D. in entomology at the University of Minnesota. During his post-doctorate at BYU, he studied homology on ribosomal RNA. He started teaching at Rutgers University in 1996. In 2015, he accepted an endowed Chair in Insect Systematics at University of California, Davis, but resigned in 2016 citing "health and family reasons." In 2017, Kjer was convicted of one count of invasion of privacy after secretly recording a 19-year-old woman while she showered in his home. He retired from academia in 2017, and now pursues a career in freelance writing and consulting.

== Research ==
Kjer studied Trichoptera phylogeny, and was a contributor to the Trichoptera Barcode of Life Database. The database is part of the Consortium for the Barcode of Life, a project which hopes to collect barcodes for all of life. He showed that substitution rates are the most important factor in site-specific rate estimation, and that codon partitioning is a poor method of differential weighting.
