= Jane Duckett =

British political scientist and academic

Jane Duckett FBA FRSE
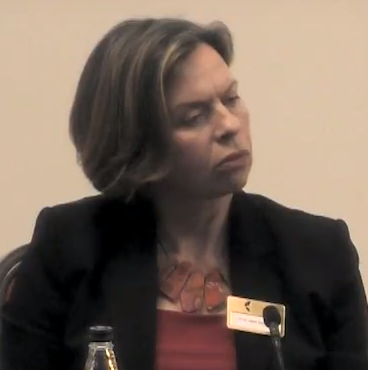
- in 2018 at SOAS
- Born: 1964 (age 61–62)
- Title: Edward Caird Chair of Politics
- Awards: Fellow of the British Academy (2016); Fellow of The Royal Society of Edinburgh (2019)

Academic background
- Education: University of Leeds; School of Oriental and African Studies, University of London

Academic work
- Discipline: Political science
- Sub-discipline: Politics of China; Social policy
- Institutions: University of Manchester; University of York; University of Glasgow

Jane Duckett, FBA, FRSE (born 1964) is a British political scientist and academic, who specialises in Chinese politics and social policy. Since 2012, she has been the Edward Caird Chair of Politics at the University of Glasgow. Previously, she was a lecturer at the University of Manchester and the University of York.

== Early life and education ==
Duckett was born in 1964. She studied Chinese studies at the University of Leeds, graduating with a first class Bachelor of Arts (BA) degree in 1987. She then studied Chinese politics at the School of Oriental and African Studies, University of London.

== Academic career ==
Before moving to Glasgow, Duckett was a lecturer at the University of Manchester (1995 to 1997) and the University of York (1997 to 1999). In 1999, she joined the University of Glasgow as a lecturer in politics. She was promoted to senior lecturer in 2002. In 2008, she founded the Scottish Centre for China Research and serves as its director. She was Professor of Chinese and Comparative Politics from 2008 to 2012. She was involved in the setting up of the Confucius Institute at the University of Glasgow in 2011. In 2012, she was appointed to the Edward Caird Chair of Politics. In September 2014, she was also appointed International Dean for East Asia.

In 2014, Duckett was elected President of the British Association for Chinese Studies. Her term ended in 2017.

== Awards ==
In 2012, Duckett was awarded the Lord Provost of Glasgow Education Award "for founding the Scottish Centre for China Research at the University of Glasgow". In July 2016, she was elected a Fellow of the British Academy (FBA), the UK's national academy for the humanities and the social sciences. She was elected a Fellow of the Royal Society of Edinburgh (FRSE) in 2019.

== Selected works ==
- Duckett, Jane (1998). The entrepreneurial state in China: real estate and commerce departments in reform era Tianjin. London: Routledge. ISBN 9780415187411.
- Duckett, Jane; Miller, William L. (2006). The Open Economy and its Enemies: Public Attitudes in East Asia and Eastern Europe. Leiden: Cambridge University Press. ISBN 9780521864060.
- Duckett, Jane (2011). The Chinese state's retreat from health: policy and the politics of retrenchment. London: Routledge. ISBN 9780415573894.
- Carrillo, Beatriz; Duckett, Jane, eds. (2011). China's changing welfare mix: local perspectives. London: Routledge. ISBN 9780415597319.
