= Tommy Zeigler case =

American murderer on death row

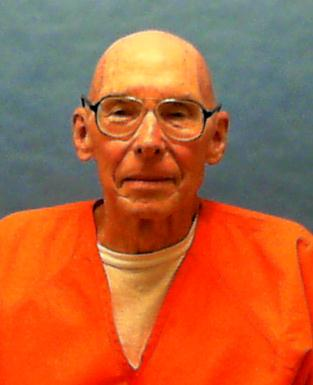
Tommy Zeigler

The Tommy Zeigler case refers to the murders of four people in Winter Garden, Florida, United States on December 24, 1975. Thirty-year-old Tommy Zeigler was charged for the quadruple murder of his wife, her parents, and another man at his family-owned furniture store. He was tried and convicted on July 2, 1976. Zeigler was sentenced to death on July 16, 1976, for two of the murders, in addition to life imprisonment without parole.

== Murders and conviction ==
On July 2, 1976, thirty-year-old William Thomas "Tommy" Zeigler Jr. (born July 25, 1945) was convicted of the quadruple murder of his wife, Eunice Zeigler, and her parents, Perry and Virginia Edwards, as well as a customer named Charlie Mays.

On December 24, 1975, a day before Christmas, at Zeigler’s furniture store in Winter Garden, Florida, somebody fired approximately 30 bullets. Eunice Zeigler and Virginia Edwards were shot and killed. Perry Edwards and Charlie Mays were beaten to death with a metal crank. Police later found the crank and five guns at the murder scene. Tommy Zeigler was also shot and wounded in the abdomen. Prosecutors later theorized he shot himself in an attempt to make it look like Mays and two other men (Edward Williams and Felton Thomas) committed the murders while robbing the furniture store. Williams and Thomas eventually testified against Zeigler.

A few days after the shootings, while he was in the hospital, Zeigler was arrested and charged with the murders. According to the prosecution, Zeigler's motive for the murders was to collect the money from two life insurance policies which were taken out on his wife months before the murders. These policies were worth a total of $500,000.

Zeigler has always said that he was a victim of a bad robbery attempt. He has also maintained that Charlie Mays was involved in this robbery. As recently as 2015, Zeigler has also said that his brother-in-law, Perry Edwards, Jr., was the person who planned the murders.

Due to publicity, Zeigler’s trial was moved to Jacksonville, Florida. A jury found him guilty. He was given the death penalty for the murders of his wife and Mays. He was also sentenced to life imprisonment for the murders of his wife's parents.

== Controversy ==
The case against Zeigler, and his trial, has been the subject of criticism by many, including civil rights activist Bianca Jagger, and a juror who voted to convict Zeigler. Among the criticized points was the judge who oversaw the trial, Maurice M. Paul; months before the murders, both Zeigler and Judge Paul testified in an unrelated case on opposing sides. Although the jury at Zeigler's trial recommended life imprisonment, Judge Paul instead sentenced Zeigler to death.

At Zeigler's trial, one of the key eyewitnesses for the prosecution, Felton Thomas, testified that on the night of the murders, he, Zeigler, and Charlie Mays drove to an orange grove to fire some guns. The prosecution believed that this was a plan from Zeigler to get their fingerprints on the guns. In 2013, however, Felton Thomas recanted parts of his testimony to investigator Lynn-Marie Carty.

In 2011, Zeigler's private investigator, Lynn-Marie Carty, located a new eyewitness named Robert Foster. On the night of the murders, he attempted to rob a gas station across the street from the Zeigler Furniture Store. Don Frye, the lead investigator on the case, had lied about Foster, saying his name was a typographical error.

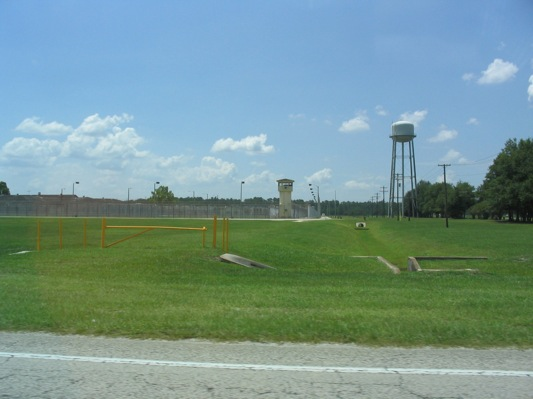
Florida State Prison, Florida

== Aftermath ==
Zeigler was scheduled to be executed on October 22, 1982. However, the U.S. District Court in Jacksonville stayed the execution due to new evidence. Zeigler was then scheduled to be executed on May 20, 1986. Zeigler's lawyers, Harold Vernon Davids and Ralph Vincent "Terry" Hadley, III rejected the two attempted executions. The 11th Circuit Court of Appeal stayed the execution due to inadequate representation. In April 1988, Zeigler's death sentence was overturned. Zeigler was re-sentenced and again sentenced to death.

In 2005, Zeigler's request for a new trial was denied after DNA tests failed to conclude that Charlie Mays was the perpetrator. Zeigler's case was denied bloodstain DNA analysis in 2013 and 2016. In April 2017, Zeigler's case was denied Touch DNA analysis.

In May 2021, a Florida prosecutor agreed to allow DNA testing on evidence that helped convict Zeigler. However, Attorney General Ashley Moody filed a motion trying to block it. On July 1, 2022, the Florida Supreme Court rejected Florida Attorney General Ashley Moody’s attempt to block modern DNA testing paid for by Zeigler’s attorneys. Zeigler’s DNA hearing was set for September 19, 2022. On December 19, 2022, he was granted permission for a DNA test. On January 26, 2025, Zeigler’s attorneys filed a 64-page ruling requesting a new trial, claiming that the DNA results prove their client's innocence.

== In popular culture ==
Zeigler's case was featured on the television program, Unsolved Mysteries. A documentary entitled "A Question of Innocence" was released in 2014 about Zeigler's case, and the death penalty in the United States. In 1992, a book was released by Phillip Finch on Zeigler's case, entitled Fatal Flaw: A True Story of Malice and Murder in a Small Southern Town.

== See also ==
- List of death row inmates in the United States § Florida
- List of longest prison sentences served
- Uxoricide
