= Capital punishment in Florida =

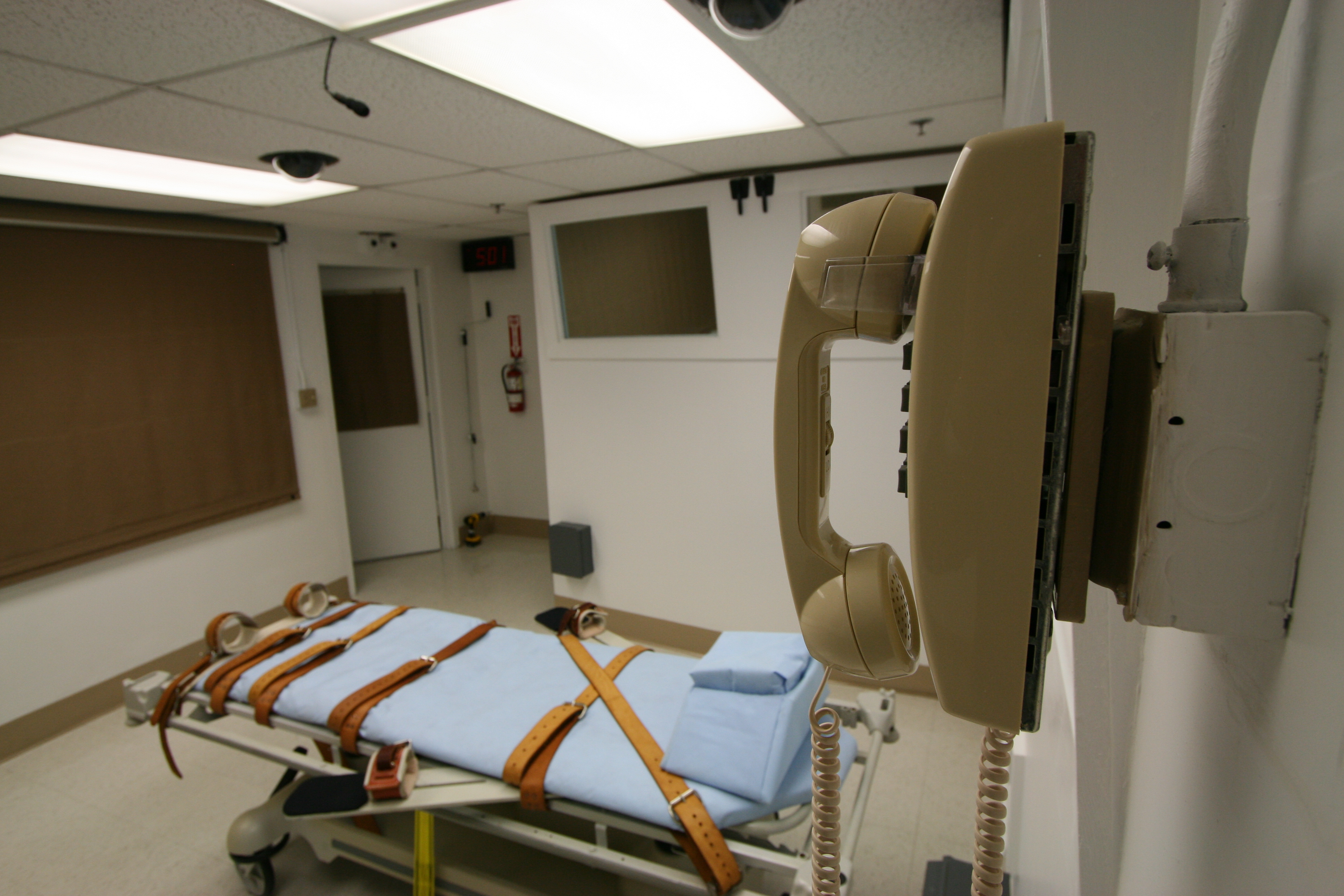
The execution chamber in Florida State Prison

Capital punishment is a legal penalty in the U.S. state of Florida.

Since 1976, the state has executed 145 convicted murderers, all at Florida State Prison. As of November 21nd, 2026, 235 offenders are awaiting execution.

== History ==
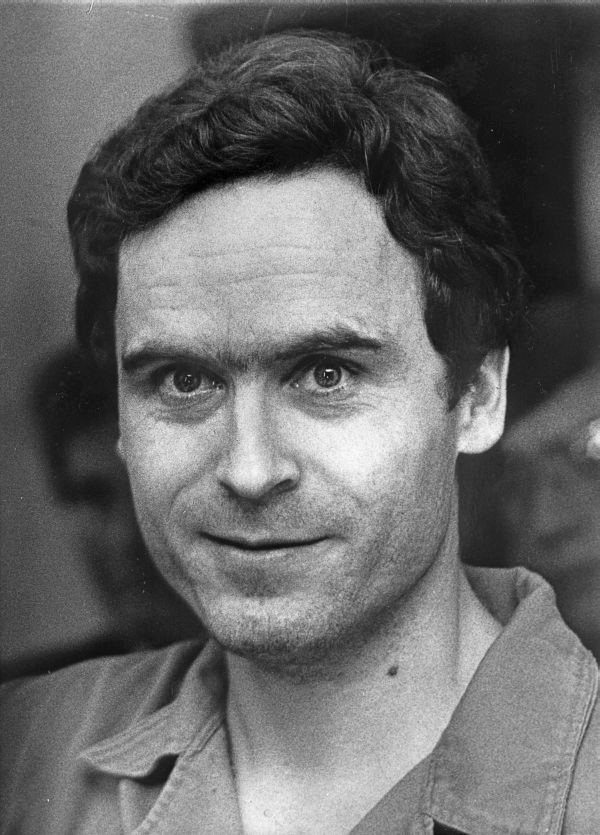
Ted Bundy, executed in 1989

Prior to 1923, executions in Florida were carried out by county governments, usually by hanging. In 1923, the Florida Legislature made electrocution the official method of execution. The new electric chair was originally housed at Union Correctional Institution, but moved to Florida State Prison in 1962.

The first electrocution was of Frank Johnson on October 7, 1924. The new electrocution law was challenged by the circuit court of Union County in June 1929 on the grounds that, as he was neither elected nor appointed, the prison superintendent could not perform executions; the state supreme court upheld the law, however, in November 1930. Florida performed its last pre-Furman execution on May 12, 1964. After the Supreme Court of the United States struck down all states' death penalty procedures in Furman v. Georgia (1972), essentially ruling the imposition of the death penalty at the same time as a guilty verdict unconstitutional, Florida was the first state to draft a newly written statute on August 12, 1972, and all 96 death row inmates (95 male and 1 female) were commuted to life in prison.

Following Furman v. Georgia, the Florida Supreme Court originally acted by automatically resentencing 100 individuals on death row to natural life terms. Florida subsequently enacted its new post-Furman statute, which was upheld by the U.S. Supreme Court in Proffitt v. Florida (1976). This landmark statute introduced a bifurcated trial structure where aggravating and mitigating circumstances were weighed in a separate sentencing hearing modeled after the Model Penal Code. Under the Proffitt framework, the jury’s sentencing determination was purely advisory, requiring the trial judge to conduct an independent balancing process to render the final sentence.

After the Supreme Court permitted the death penalty once more in Gregg v. Georgia (1976), the state electrocuted John Arthur Spenkelink on May 25, 1979, which was the second execution in the U.S. since 1967, after that of Gary Gilmore on January 17, 1977, in Utah.

The default method is lethal injection; the state also allows electrocution. A March 2025 bill proposed specifically allowing alternate methods of firing squad, nitrogen gas or other constitutionally allowable methods if lethal injection drugs were no longer available.

On July 31, 2025, with its 9th execution of the year, Florida broke its record for the most executions in a year, post-Furman. On September 30, with its 13th execution of the year, Florida carried out the most executions in a single year in all of its state history. On December 18, with its 19th execution of the year, that of serial killer Frank A. Walls, Florida had executed more people in one year than any other U.S. state in the past 15 years.

On July 28, 2026, 80-year-old Dominick Anthony Occhicone Jr. became the oldest person executed in the state for the 1986 murders of his ex-girlfriend's parents. Earlier that year two 74-year-old prisoners were executed. Dusty Ray Spencer was executed on June 25, 2026 for the 1992 murder of his ex-wife Karen, and Dennis Michael Sochor was executed on July 14, 2026, for the 1981 rape and murder of Patricia Gifford.

Florida has conducted 33 documented double executions between 1924 and 2026. The state's most recent double execution occurred on July 28, 2026, when James Aren Duckett and Dominick Anthony Occhicone Jr. were both executed for murder.

In 2026, the November 5 execution of Jesse Guardado was the 19th carried out in Florida, which tied the record number of 19 executions conducted by Florida in the previous year of 2025. Two weeks later, on November 19, 2026, Thomas Mitchell Overton was the 20th person to be executed in the state of Florida, which broke the previous year's record number of 19 executions conducted in Florida in a single year.

== Capital crimes ==
In Florida, a murderer can be eligible for capital punishment if their crime involves one of the following aggravating factors:

1. It was committed by a person previously convicted of a felony and under sentence of imprisonment, placed on community control, or on felony probation.
2. The defendant was previously convicted of another capital felony or of a felony involving the use or threat of violence to the person.
3. The defendant knowingly created a great risk of death to many persons.
4. It was committed while the defendant was engaged, or was an accomplice, in the commission of, or an attempt to commit a specified felony (such as aggravated child abuse, arson, kidnapping, placing or discharging of a destructive device or bomb).
5. It was committed for the purpose of avoiding or preventing a lawful arrest or effecting an escape from custody.
6. It was committed for pecuniary [financial] gain.
7. It was committed to disrupt or hinder the lawful exercise of any governmental function or the enforcement of laws.
8. It was especially heinous, atrocious, or cruel.
9. It was committed in a cold, calculated, and premeditated manner without any pretense of moral or legal justification.
10. The victim was a law enforcement officer engaged in the performance of his or her official duties.
11. The victim was an elected or appointed public official engaged in the performance of his or her official duties if the motive for the capital felony was related, in whole or in part, to the victim's official capacity.
12. The victim was a person less than 12 years of age.
13. The victim was particularly vulnerable due to advanced age or disability, or because the defendant stood in a position of familial or custodial authority over the victim.
14. It was committed by a criminal gang member.
15. It was committed by a person currently or formerly designated as a sexual predator.
16. It was committed by a person subject to a restrictive order or a foreign protection order, and was committed against the person who obtained the injunction or protection order or any spouse, child, sibling, or parent of this person.
17. It resulted from the unlawful distribution by a person 18 years of age or older of any substance listed in Fla. Stat. §782.04(1)(a)3., when such substance is proven to have caused, or is proven to have been a substantial factor in causing, the death of the user.

Florida statute 782.04(1)(a)3. specifies that when a person 18 years of age or older unlawfully distributes certain controlled substances, including but not limited to cocaine, opium/opioids, fentanyl, carfentanil, methamphetamine, or analogs thereof, and the use of that substance alone is proven to have caused the death of the user or been a substantial factor in the user's death, regardless of any other substances involved, then the distributor has committed murder in the first degree. First degree murder is a capital felony in Florida, punishable by death or life imprisonment. This statute holds drug dealers strictly liable for deaths resulting from the drugs they illegally provide, and subjects them to the state's harshest penalty if the drugs are proven to be the proximate cause of a user's death.

Florida statute also provides the death penalty for capital drug trafficking and discharging or using a destructive device causing death. A provision for capital sexual battery was found unconstitutional in the 2008 U.S. Supreme Court case Kennedy v. Louisiana. No one is on death row in the United States for drug trafficking.

In May 2023, after being passed by the Florida Legislature, Governor Ron DeSantis signed a bill that allows the death penalty for defendants convicted of sexually abusing a child under the age of 12. Since the law contradicts the ruling in Kennedy v. Louisiana that prohibits the death penalty for crimes in which the victim did not die and the victim's death was not intended, it will likely be challenged in the courts. The first attempted use of the law was in the case of Joseph Giampa, who ultimately pleaded guilty and accepted a mandatory life sentence rather than risk possible execution.

In April 2025, a bill was proposed to introduce the death penalty for human trafficking of a child below 12 years of age.

Beyond the original list of capital aggravating factors, legal scholars and empirical studies have highlighted that the number of aggravators in Florida has doubled since Proffitt, expanding from eight statutory aggravating circumstances to sixteen. The cold, calculated, and premeditated (CCP) aggravator was added in 1979, followed by specific victim-type designations such as law enforcement officers (1987), victims under 12 years of age (1995), and vulnerable individuals due to advanced age or disability (1996). Legal commentators observe that this gradual statutory expansion has significantly broadened the pool of capital-eligible cases, making it difficult to find a first-degree murder case that does not fit within at least one statutory eligibility criterion.

== Legal process ==
=== Trial ===
In Hurst v. Florida (2014), the United States Supreme Court struck down part of Florida's death penalty law, holding it was not sufficient for a judge to determine the aggravating facts to be used in considering a death sentence. The court ruled that this trial process violated the Sixth Amendment right to jury trial under Ring v. Arizona (2002). The state supreme court later held that this applied only to defendants sentenced by a non-unanimous jury from 2002 to 2014.

=== Sentencing ===
When the prosecution seeks the death penalty, the jury must unanimously find that an aggravating factor found by the prosecution exists, making the defendant eligible for a death sentence. Once this eligibility is established, a supermajority of at least 8 jurors must concur that the established aggravating factors outweigh the mitigating factors for a recommendation for a death sentence. Should less than eight jurors find that the aggravating factors do not outweigh the mitigating factors, the jury's recommendation shall be a life sentence, which shall be the sentence imposed by the trial judge (there is no retrial). Should the jury make a recommendation for a sentence of death, the trial judge shall have the discretion to determine whether a death or life sentence shall be imposed; the trial judge must justify his or her reasoning in a written order.

Prior to 2014, the judge decided the sentence alone, and the jury gave only a non-binding advice. In March 2014, the Florida Legislature provided a 10-juror supermajority to issue a sentence of death. This was also challenged and in October 2014, the Florida Supreme Court struck down the law, finding that death sentences can only be handed down by a unanimous jury. The court later reversed this finding, allowing Governor Ron DeSantis in 2023 to sign Senate Bill 450 that eliminated the unanimous jury requirement and replaced it with a minimum of two-thirds (8 out of 12 jurors).

Following Hurst v. Florida (2016) and Hurst v. State (2016), the Florida Supreme Court established retroactivity rules in Mosley v. State and Asay v. State. Under these decisions, death sentences that were not yet final when Ring v. Arizona was decided on June 24, 2002, were eligible for resentencing relief, while those finalized prior to that date were denied relief. However, in State v. Poole (2020), the Florida Supreme Court receded from parts of Hurst v. State, concluding that jury unanimity is not required under the state or federal Constitution to recommend a death sentence, provided the jury unanimously finds at least one aggravating factor beyond a reasonable doubt.

=== Appeals ===
On June 14, 2013, Governor Rick Scott signed the Timely Justice Act of 2013. The law is designed to overhaul and speed up the process of capital punishment. It creates tighter time frames for a person sentenced to death to make appeals and post-conviction motions and imposes reporting requirements on case progress.

Beyond procedural timelines, systemic and structural issues surrounding legal representation have been widely documented in capital post-conviction litigation. An assessment report by the American Bar Association (ABA) highlighted significant concerns regarding low statutory compensation caps for court-appointed conflict defense counsel and lower qualification requirements for post-conviction attorneys compared to trial counsel. Additionally, empirical research spanning multiple decades has documented geographic disparities in capital charging across Florida's twenty judicial circuits, alongside statistical analyses evaluating the relationship between the race of the victim and prosecutorial decisions to seek the death penalty.

== Death row and executions ==
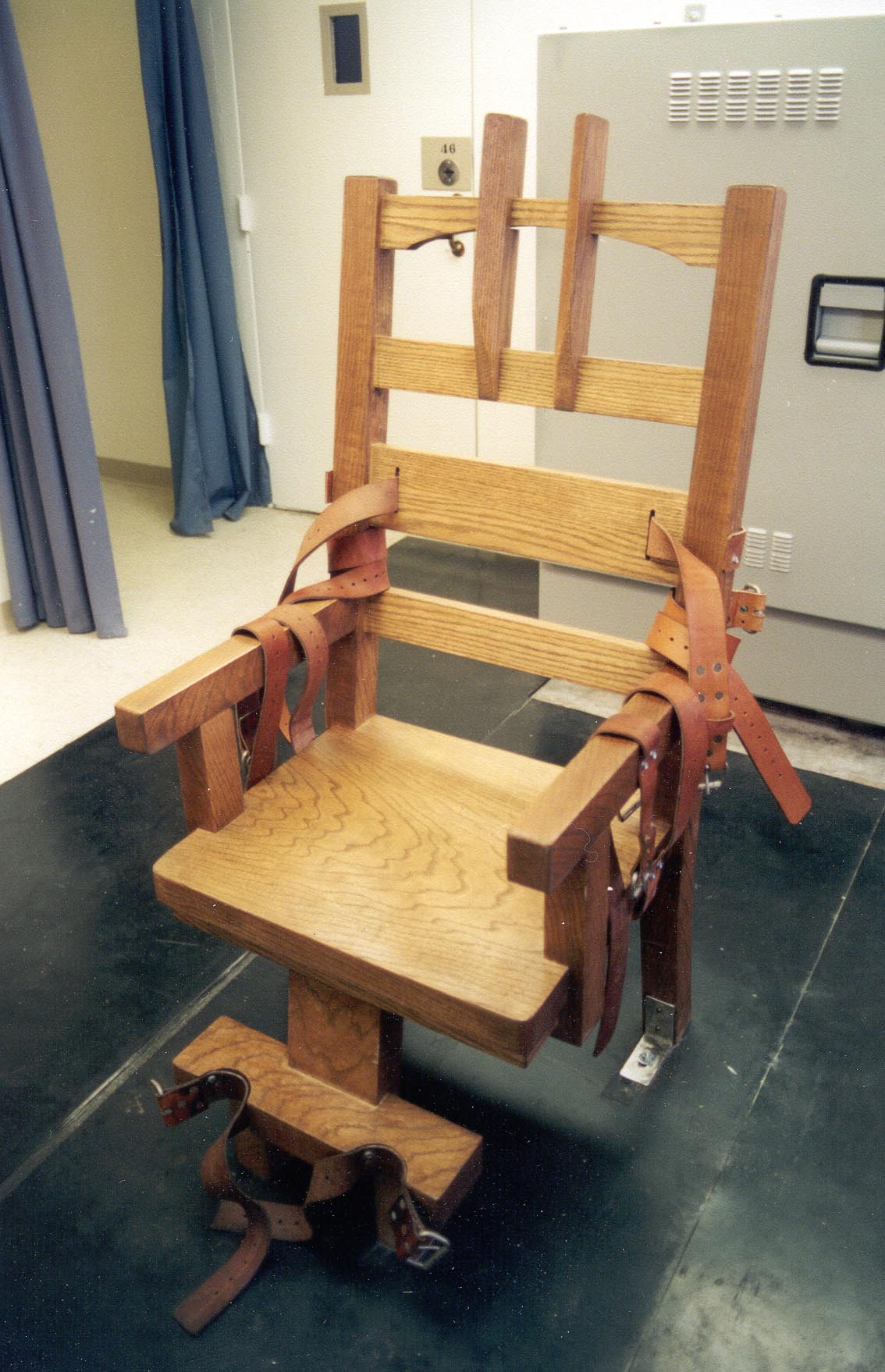
New electric chair installed in 1999 at the Florida State Prison near Starke, Florida

Death sentences are carried out via lethal injection. However, the sentence can be carried out by electrocution if the offender requests it. If lethal injection or electrocution is held unconstitutional, statutes authorize the use of "any constitutional method of execution" instead.

The only execution chamber in Florida is located at Florida State Prison near Starke. When sentenced, male convicts who receive the death penalty are incarcerated at either Florida State Prison itself, or at Union Correctional Institution next door to Florida State Prison, while female convicts who are sentenced to death are incarcerated at Lowell Correctional Institution north of Ocala. Inmates are moved to the death row at Florida State Prison when their death warrant is signed.

Florida used public hanging under a local jurisdiction, overseen and performed by the sheriffs of the counties where the crimes took place. However, in 1923, the Florida Legislature passed a law replacing hanging with the electric chair and stated that all future execution will be performed under state jurisdiction inside prisons. The electric chair became a subject of strong controversy in the 1990s after three executions received considerable media attention and were labeled as "botched" by opponents (Jesse Tafero in 1990, Pedro Medina in 1997, and Allen Lee Davis in 1999). While most states switched to the lethal injection, many politicians in Florida opposed giving up "Old Sparky", seeing it as a "deterrent". Finally, after the Davis execution, lethal injection was enabled as the default method.

During Governor Ron DeSantis's tenure, the state has executed more inmates (48) than under any other governor in the state's history.

Death row inmates are permitted to interact with other inmates during dayroom and recreation activities, and they are entitled to some privileges such as snacks, radios and a 13-inch television, but they do not have air conditioning or cable television. Unlike the general prison population, death row inmates wear orange T-shirts to differentiate themselves from the other prisoners, although they also wear the same blue pants as the rest of the inmates. For prisoners placed on death watch before their scheduled executions, they may have a radio and television set up outside their cell bars.

On the day of their executions, inmates are allowed to request for a special last meal and a non-alcoholic beverage that costs not more than $40. They will also be given a chance to shower and receive appropriate clothing. After the sentence is carried out, the inmate's body will be transported to the medical examiner's office in Alachua County. The executioner is a private citizen who receives a payment of $200 for each execution and the executioner's identity will be kept anonymous in accordance with state law.

== Clemency ==
The Governor of Florida has the right to commute the death penalty, but only with positive recommendation of clemency from a Board, where they sit.

Between 1925 and 1965, 57 commutations were granted out of 268 cases. Since 1972, when the death penalty was re-instituted, only six commutations have been granted, all under the administration of Governor Bob Graham.

The Board of Executive Clemency in Florida consists of the Governor and three members of the Cabinet. Under the Rules of Executive Clemency, at least two Cabinet members must concur with the Governor to grant a pardon or commutation. The clemency evaluation process operates with significant administrative confidentiality; there are no statutory requirements obligating the Board to issue formal written explanations or to hold public hearings for every death-sentenced applicant. Analysts point out that executive commutations have become exceedingly rare in modern decades, with the last death sentence commuted on humanitarian grounds occurring in 1983.

== See also ==
- Florida Criminal Justice Standards & Training Commission
- Capital punishment in the United States
- List of people executed in Florida
- List of people executed in Florida (pre-1972)
- List of death row inmates in the United States § Florida
- Crime in Florida
- Law of Florida
- Murder in Florida law
- Gas chamber
