= James Dupree Henry =

American criminal (1950–1984)

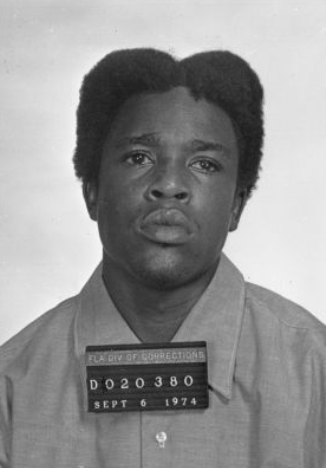
- Born: January 17, 1950; Orlando, Florida, U.S.
- Died: September 20, 1984 (aged 34); Florida State Prison, Raiford, Florida, U.S.
- Cause of death: Execution by electrocution
- Convictions: First degree murder Aggravated assault Aggravated battery
- Penalty: Death

Details
- Date: March 23, 1974
- Country: United States
- State: Florida
- Date apprehended: March 28, 1974

James Dupree Henry (January 17, 1950 – September 20, 1984) was an American criminal who was executed in Florida for the murder of civil rights leader Zellie Riley. Henry slashed Riley's throat during a robbery in Orlando on March 23, 1974. He also shot and almost killed Orlando detective Ronald E. Ferguson during his arrest five days later. Civil rights leaders Jesse Jackson and Coretta Scott King, along with the victim's son William Riley, advocated on behalf of Henry to stop his execution. Nonetheless, Henry was executed in the electric chair in September 1984.

== Early life ==
James Dupree Henry was born in Orlando on January 17, 1950. Growing up, he shifted among family members, and in later years said he was unsure as to whether or not he had any siblings. It was not until his murder conviction that he met his real mother.

Henry had prior convictions for aggravated assault and aggravated battery In 1965, when he was 15 years old, he stabbed a 19-year-old man in Orlando's west side. He claimed the man was trying to rob him, but was sent to the boy's reformatory in Marianna, Florida, for a few months. Henry was again arrested in 1970 for shooting and critically wounding a man. Henry once again claimed it was self-defense, but the man claimed Henry had tried to rob him. During his imprisonment, Henry was accused of attacking a jail supervisor. In 1973, Henry took part in a prison fight, during which he suffered a knife wound to his left eye, causing him to permanently lose sight in that eye. Later that year Henry was released from prison.

== Victim ==
Zellie L. "Z. L." Riley (April 1, 1892 – March 23, 1974) was a prominent civil rights leader in Orlando. Born in Georgia in 1892, he moved to the Orlando area in 1920, and became a member of the Mount Olive A.M.E. Church. In 1950, he founded the Orlando Negro Chamber of Commerce (now known as the African American Chamber of Commerce). In 1957, he was promoted as the chairman of the Negro division for the United Appeal campaign. He also was behind several other projects to alter the view of African Americans of Orlando, such as a community center in Washington Shores. After his death, Z.L. Riley Park was opened in the neighborhood of Parramore.

== Murder ==
On Saturday, March 23, 1974, Henry broke into Riley's home at 422 Sunset Drive. Henry, who had planned a robbery, attacked Riley, who was 81 years old at the time. Henry bound Riley, gagged him, slashed his throat open with a razor, then viciously beat him with his fists and a gun. After the attack Henry scoured the house and stole multiple valuables, including $64 of Riley's personal money.

The following day, Sunday, March 24, Riley was expected to attend church with his nephew, but did not show up. In a welfare check on his home, police found his body. Carl T. Langford, the mayor of Orlando during this time, spoke to the Orlando Sentinel on March 25. He said "I've known Mr. Riley nearly 30 years. He was always concerned about Orlando and the people of Orlando, and, in his quiet, gentle way, he worked to bring about better conditions in the section where he lived and better understanding between segments of the community". A reward fund was started on March 26 to locate the killer. Riley was buried at Washington Park Cemetery. Henry was identified as the killer, as his fingerprints were found at the crime scene.

On March 28, 1974, Ronald Eugene Ferguson, an award-winning Orlando detective, approached Henry to question him about the murder. Once confronted about the fingerprint information, Henry attacked Ferguson and stole his gun. He then demanded Ferguson to get away from him, but when he refused he shot Ferguson once in the upper chest and the lower right abdomen. Henry continued to beat Ferguson until backup arrived, and Henry was arrested. Ferguson was rushed to the hospital where he was treated for critical injuries, but ultimately made a full recovery.

== Incarceration ==
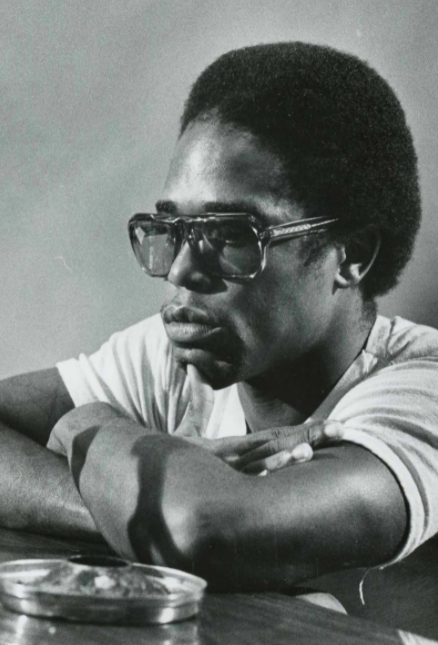
Henry during an in-prison press conference in November 1979

In June 1974, a 12-member jury found Henry guilty of first-degree murder and sentenced him to death days later. He was housed at Florida State Prison to await his execution. He was first scheduled to be executed on December 6, 1979, after Florida governor Bob Graham signed to approve the execution.

As Henry's scheduled execution date approached, William Riley, Zellie Riley's son, who was a taxi service owner in Orlando, publicly stated that his father "loved peace and despised vengeance", and that he did not want Henry to be executed; "This is not the way, a life for a life. My father taught me God gave life and only God can take life. We suffered as a family when he died, and we ask you not to add to our suffering by killing James Dupree Henry".

Seven days before Henry was scheduled to be executed, Justice John Reed ordered to stop the execution due to an investigation on whether or not capital punishment was disproportionately used in Orange County. In 1981, a federal court ruled that Henry would have to be re-sentenced by a new jury. This was due to the testimony of Ferguson in Henry's trial, which the court ruled should not have been allowed. However, this never ended up happening and Henry remained on death row.

== Execution ==
In 1984, Governor Graham delayed Henry's September 19 execution, rescheduling it to the next day. That same day he also delayed the execution of Aubrey Adams Jr., who was on death row for killing an 8-year-old in 1978. In September 1984, Graham received letters from civil rights advocates Jesse Jackson and Coretta Scott King, begging the governor to grant clemency for Henry. In the letters both were convinced Henry's conviction was racially motivated. In response Governor Graham met with Jackson and the two held a private 20-minute meeting. Jackson presented Graham a note King had written which stated, "it saddens me to learn that the state of Florida is about to execute Mr. Henry despite the pleas of the victim's family and his community".

Nevertheless, Graham stated Jackson and King did not change his mind about Henry, and that the execution was going to take place. On September 20, Henry ate his final meal which consisted of a dozen oysters mixed with hot sauce and crackers. In his final statement to the media, Henry stated that he felt innocent; "My final words are, I am innocent". Following that, at 7 a.m., Henry was executed by the electric chair.

== See also ==
- List of people executed in Florida
- List of people executed in the United States in 1984
