= Carol City murders =

Serial murder case in Florida

- Map of Miami-Dade County highlighting Carol City
- Location: Carol City, Florida, United States
- Date: October 1974–January 1978
- Attack type: Robbery, rape, serial murder, mass murder, mass shooting
- Weapons: .357 Magnum Ruger revolver; Shotgun; knife
- Deaths: 12
- Perpetrators: John Errol Ferguson; Marvin Francois; Beauford White
- Motive: Unknown

The Carol City murders were a series of murders that took place predominantly in Carol City, Florida, and in and around Miami-Dade County between October 1974 and January 1978. The murders were committed by John Errol Ferguson (February 27, 1948 – August 5, 2013) who murdered at least eight people but is believed to have killed up to twelve. He was aided in six of the murders by two accomplices: Marvin Francois (January 18, 1946 – May 29, 1985) and Beauford James White (October 29, 1945 – August 28, 1987).

On July 27, 1977, Ferguson, Francois, and White entered a drug house in Carol City where they tied up a total of eight people and shot all of them in the head execution-style. Two of the eight survived. At the time, the incident was the largest case of mass murder in Miami-Dade County history. Months after the massacre, Ferguson murdered a teenage couple in Hialeah after raping the female victim. He is also suspected to be responsible for the May 1977 murders of an elderly couple and is suspected of killing a further two men in 1974.

Ferguson, Francois, and White were all eventually captured, sentenced to death, and executed by the state of Florida. Francois was executed in the electric chair on May 29, 1985, followed by White, who was also executed in the electric chair on August 28, 1987. Ferguson was executed over two decades later by lethal injection on August 5, 2013, following years of appeals over his sanity.

== Backgrounds ==
=== John Errol Ferguson ===
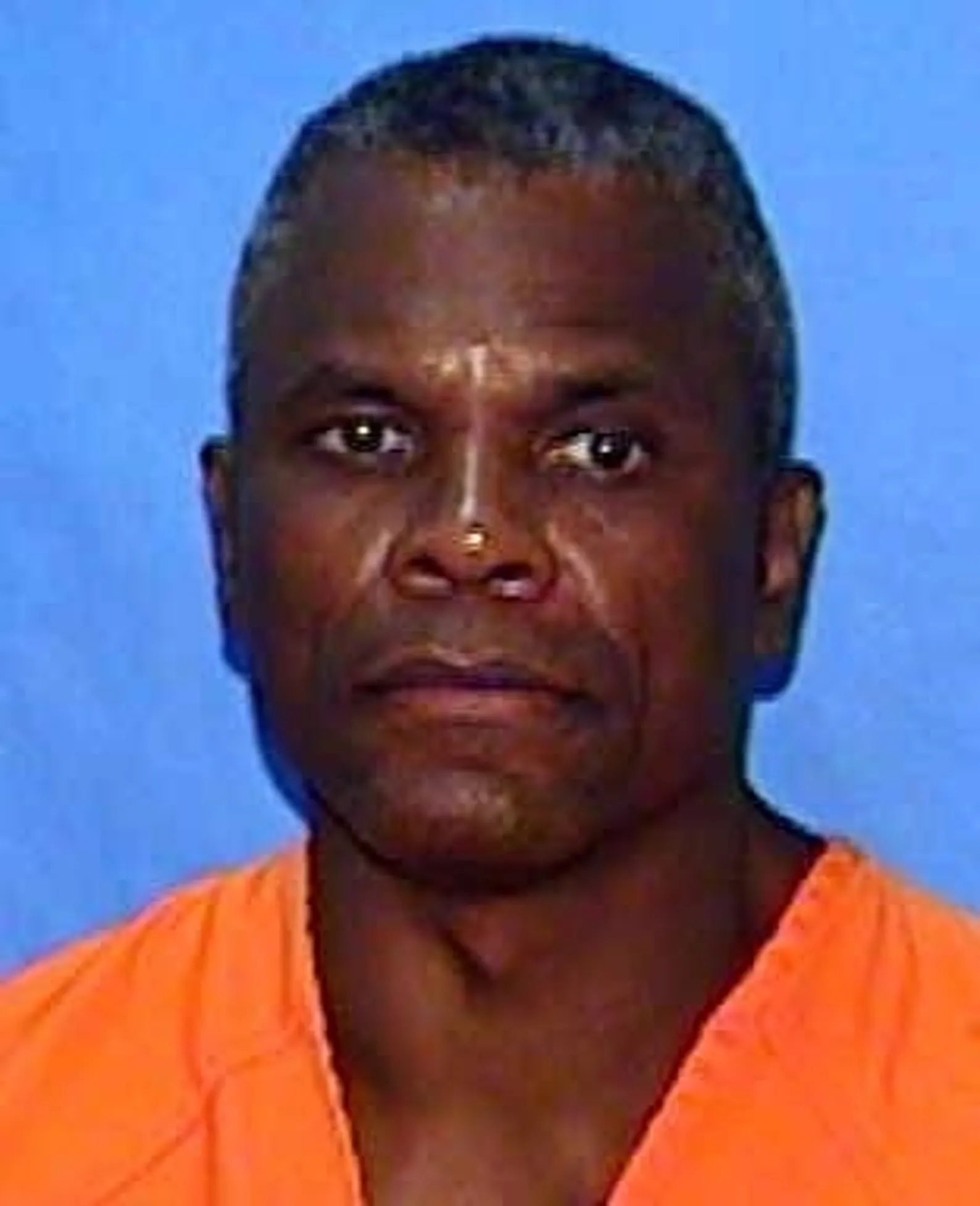
John Errol Ferguson

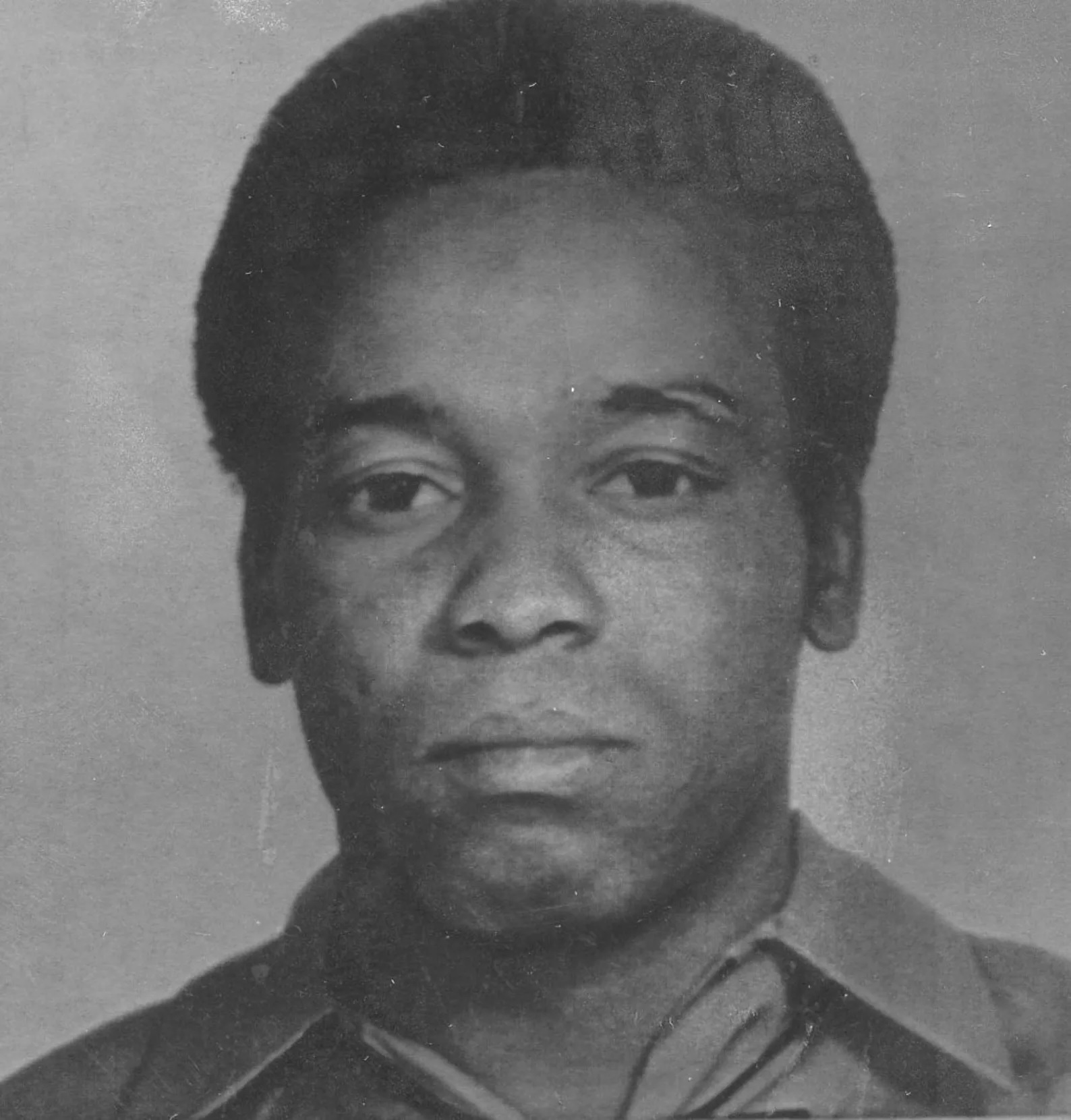
Marvin Francois

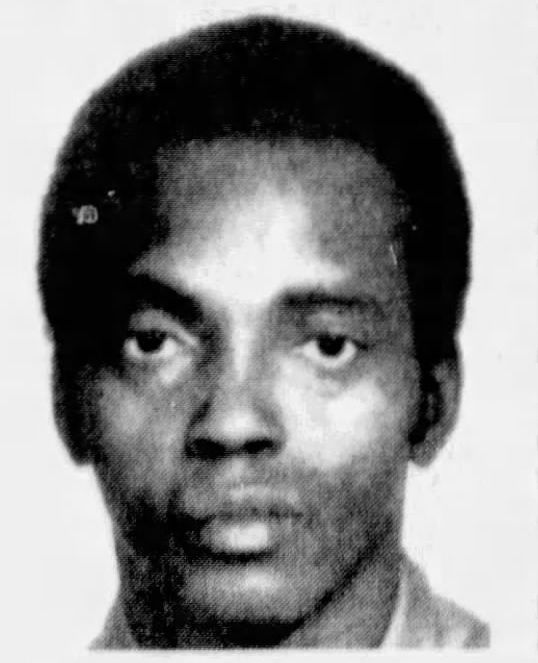
Beauford J. White

Ferguson, the fourth oldest of eight children, had been known to psychiatrists since he was 10. His father died when he was 13 and his mother had managed to take care of the children on her own. Ferguson dropped out of school after repeating 9th grade three times.

Ferguson had his first police encounter when he was 13, after being caught driving someone else's car without their consent. He continued to get in trouble with the police throughout his youth. Before the murders, Ferguson had three prior felony convictions: a 1965 conviction for assault with intent to commit rape, a 1971 conviction for robbery, and a 1976 conviction for violent resistance to a police officer.

In 1969, Ferguson tried to kill a police officer after a traffic stop. He disarmed officer Edward Hartman, ordered him on his knees, and told him to beg for his life. Hartman complied, but also slipped a revolver out of his boot. Ferguson fired four shots at Hartman but missed all of them. Hartman then shot Ferguson four times.

In 1975, a court-appointed psychiatrist diagnosed John Ferguson as "dangerous to himself and others ... homicidal ... a man who should not be released under any circumstances." Another psychiatrist said Ferguson's potential for recovery was minimal and that the probability of him returning to a life of crime was very high. He described Ferguson as "explosive ... a dangerous person who cannot cope with day to day living." Ferguson bragged to his friends that he had feigned insanity and misled the doctors. A woman who knew him later said, "He was into psychology. He told us he psyched them out. He'd say things like 'See that airplane flying in the room?'"

After repeatedly escaping from a hospital, Ferguson, who had previously been acquitted of six robberies and two assaults on the grounds of insanity, was sent to the more secure Florida State Hospital. In June 1976, doctors said Ferguson's treatment was complete and that further hospitalization was not necessary. Ferguson was sent to Miami to face charges of resisting arrest after a hospital escape. Although a psychiatrist warned that he was "unpredictable and a danger to himself and others", a judge ruled Ferguson competent and later accepted a guilty plea. He was sentenced to 18 months in prison and two years of probation, and released 225 days later.

=== Marvin Francois ===
Francois, whose parents were not married, had an impoverished upbringing. His father was a heroin addict who brought other addicts into the home to take heroin in front of his son and beat Francois when he would not fight with the other children. Francois's mother was a sex worker who did not do much for her son. She married, but Francois's stepfather abused him. Although Francois did not finish school, he did obtain his GED.

=== Beauford J. White ===
White had a lengthy criminal record dating back to July 1963 for rape, car theft, and heroin possession. White and six young men and teenage boys were accused of gang raping a 16-year-old girl on September 8, 1965. In 1966, White pleaded guilty to attempted rape and was sentenced to two years in prison. At the time of the murders, White was on parole for escape and selling drugs.

== Preliminary murders ==
On October 30, 1974, James Ward, a 40-year-old mental hospital escapee, was murdered. His body was dumped in Collier County and he was killed by a shotgun blast. On November 1, the body of another man named Joseph Walters was found near railroad tracks in Miami by a freight train employee. Walters had also been killed by a shotgun blast, but had additionally been shot repeatedly with a handgun. There were no leads in the Walters case until February 1977, when the mother of the man convicted of Ward's murder made contact with Linda Blue, the lead homicide detective who was investigating the case. Convicted killer Edward Eugene Oliver had been spotted leaving the area where Ward's body had been found and was ultimately convicted of murdering him. Oliver made contact with Blue and claimed he wanted to talk about both murders.

On February 11, 1977, Oliver told Blue that he and John Errol Ferguson had carried out the murders of both Walters and Ward and that Ferguson was the shooter. Oliver stated that he, Ferguson, Walters, and Ward had all been part of a gang that had robbed a Miami clothing store and a warehouse on Florida's west coast. Ward had then been tasked with selling the merchandise but had instead disappeared, apparently intending to keep the loot all for himself. In October 1974, Ferguson and Oliver tracked down Walters, who refused to talk. According to Oliver, Ferguson then killed him with a shotgun before dumping his body near the railroad tracks. The two men then found Ward on October 30, and Oliver claimed that Ferguson was also the one who shot and killed him. After the duo dumped Ward's body in Collier County, only Oliver was spotted leaving the area. He was arrested and charged with the murder of Ward. After the interview, Oliver was given a polygraph examination, which he passed. Additionally, clothing found in Walters' home linked him to the burglary at the Miami clothing store.

Ferguson was already in jail at the time of the revelation for an unrelated crime, serving an eighteen-month sentence for resisting arrest. As he was due for parole in April, Blue wanted to hurry and charge Ferguson. Ferguson was brought to the Dade County Jail, but the charges were never filed. After Blue sent the case to the state attorney's office, the assistant state attorney refused to file any charges, as according to him, Oliver's words were insufficient for prosecution, and he wanted more proof of Ferguson's involvement. Blue thought Oliver's testimony was sufficient grounds for charging Ferguson, but Oliver also wanted immunity in exchange for his testimony, which the assistant state attorney would not offer. As no charges were filed, Ferguson was paroled in April 1977.

In May 1977, the bodies of 75-year-old Raymond Perry, and his wife, 82-year-old Katherine Perry, were found in their room at the Gold Dust Motel in Miami. The couple, who were from St. Petersburg, Florida, had been tied up, beaten, robbed, and shot to death execution-style. The gun used to kill them was a handgun.

== Carol City massacre ==
On July 27, 1977, Ferguson, accompanied by Marvin Francois, Beauford White, and Adolphus Archie, drove to the home of 33-year-old Livingston Stocker, a Vietnam veteran and small-time marijuana dealer. Ferguson, who was posing as a Florida Power & Light Company worker, knocked on the door of Stocker's home, in Carol City, Florida. 24-year-old Margaret Wooden answered, and Ferguson gained access to the property. After checking several rooms, he drew a handgun, tied up Wooden, and then blindfolded her. He then opened the front door to let Francois and White inside, while Archie waited outside in the car as a getaway driver. All the men wore masks and were armed with guns. The men ransacked and searched the property for drugs and money.

Approximately two hours later, six of Wooden's friends, including Stocker, arrived at the house. Ferguson and his friends ambushed them, searched them, tied them up, and then blindfolded each of them. A short time later, another one of Stocker's friends, 24-year-old Michael Miller, entered the property and was also ambushed, bound, and searched. Miller and Wooden were placed in the bedroom and the other six were bound in the living room. At that point, the mask Francois was wearing fell off and revealed his face. Ferguson then said they would have to kill everyone.

Francois shot all six people in the living room with a shotgun, execution-style. He fatally shot Stocker, 35-year-old Henry Clayton, 26-year-old John Holmes, 37-year-old Gilbert Williams, and 35-year-old Charles Stinson. He also shot 45-year-old Johnnie Hall, who survived. Ferguson headed to the bedroom and shot both Wooden and Miller in the head with a handgun, also execution-style. Wooden had heard shots coming from the living room and witnessed a pillow come toward her head. She was then shot and witnessed Miller being fatally shot in the head. Although Wooden did not personally see the shooter, she did hear Ferguson run out of the room.

While the shootings occurred, White remained by the front door with a gun to prevent anyone from entering or escaping the property. The gunmen then left. Wooden and Hall survived by turning their heads as the shootings occurred. Wooden eventually managed to get to her feet, escape the property, and run to a neighbor's house, where she called the police. When the police arrived, they found the six dead bodies, all of whom had been shot in the back of the head, and had their hands tied behind their backs.

According to Archie, the killers drove to a motel room after the massacre and split the stolen money, which totaled around $800. In Archie's testimony, he claimed Francois bragged about the killings and compared them to the Saint Valentine's Day Massacre, whereas White was upset and looked like he had seen a ghost.

On September 1, 1977, police arrested Archie while questioning him at the Dade County Sheriff's Office. In the early hours of September 2, Francois was arrested at the Dade County Jail, where he was being held on unrelated shoplifting charges. White was arrested at the Ron Dini Motel later that day. Ferguson, however, remained at large.

== Hialeah murders ==
On January 8, 1978, 17-year-old Brian Glenfeldt and 17-year-old Belinda Worley, a couple, left a Youth-for-Christ meeting in Hialeah. They were meant to meet up with friends at an ice cream parlor, however, they never showed up. Instead, the two had gone for ice cream at Farrell's Ice Cream Parlor, located at Hialeah's Westland Mall. They then left and parked at a field known as a popular lovers' lane. Ferguson then approached them, posing as a police officer, intending to rob the couple. He fatally shot Glenfeldt behind the wheel of his mother's car, before taking Worley into the nearby woods where he raped and murdered her.

At 2:00 a.m. the families of Glenfeldt and Worley filed missing person reports for both of them. The following morning, Worley's body was discovered under a tree in a wooded area. All of Worley's clothes, apart from her jeans, were next to her body. She had been killed by a shot to the back of the head. An autopsy later revealed that she had been raped. Glenfeldt's body was located a quarter-mile away with a bullet in his head, slumped over behind the wheel of his mother's car. He had also been shot in the chest and the arm. Jewelry had been stolen from Worley's body, and the cash in Glenfeldt's wallet had also been taken.

On April 5, 1978, Ferguson was finally captured after the FBI received a tip-off.

== Trials ==
Francois was the first of the three killers to be convicted. On April 24, 1978, he was sentenced to death for his role in the Carol City massacre.

White's trial was more controversial. His defense argued that he did not actually kill anyone and instead acted as a lookout by standing watch at the door of the property as the killings occurred. As such, the jury unanimously recommended that he be sentenced to life in prison. On April 27, 1978, the judge overrode the recommendation and sentenced White to death, noting his previous criminal history, which the jury had not been informed of. In 1984, his death sentence was overturned by a Dade Circuit judge, who resentenced him to life in prison. On April 25, 1985, the Supreme Court of Florida reversed the decision and reinstated White's death sentence.

Ferguson was tried last. On May 25, 1978, he was sentenced to death for his role in the Carol City massacre. On October 7, 1978, he received a further two death sentences for the Hialeah murders. In 1982, the Supreme Court of Florida threw out the death sentence, saying that the judge failed to consider evidence of Ferguson's mental illness. However, a year later, he was resentenced to death. He was never charged in the 1974 murders of Walters and Ward, or the 1977 motel murders of Raymond and Katherine Perry. However, the handgun used in the Carol City massacre and the Hialeah murders was found to be the same handgun that had been used in the motel murders and the shooting of Walters.

Archie pleaded guilty to six counts of second degree murder and was sentenced to 20 years in prison for his role as the getaway driver in the Carol City massacre. He was the state's key witness in the trials of Ferguson, Francois, and White. Archie has since been released from prison.

== Executions ==
On May 29, 1985, Francois was executed in the electric chair. He was executed shortly after 7:00 a.m. and spent his final hours with his mother, girlfriend, and twin teenage children. His last meal consisted of shrimp, lobster tail, barbecued spare ribs, chicken breast, watermelon, strawberries, sliced tomatoes, and french fries. He refused the services of a clergyman.

Reading from a written last statement, Francois said:

The Miami institutionalized white racist judiciary and law enforcement systems have made me, the once heroin addict, the scapegoat, with fabricated assertions, dishonest policemen, unethical judges, unethical state attorneys, drug pushers, and drug users for their political and personal ambitions and their inability and unwillingness to control the drug sphere of Miami's communities as America made Grenada the scapegoat for their inability or unwillingness to control the blowing up of the American Embassy in Lebanon where many soldiers were killed. That is the plight of the black race at the hands of the white race, be it one black like me or many blacks as in South Africa. The state of Florida honors the drug merchants of the black community with my death as the white race honors King and Tutu with Nobel Peace Prizes for the death of the minds of the black race. I do not extend sympathy to me, for I am as a grain of sand on the beach of the black race. The black race has lost its pride and dignity and is slowly dying from within and without, and blind with seeing eyes. My death ends my tears and the fortune of watching my race slowly die. I am a black American, Ashanti Ankobia. I join my ancestors.

After finishing his written statement, Francois said "If there is such a thing as an Antichrist, it ain't one man but the whole white race."

On August 28, 1987, White was executed in the electric chair. He was pronounced dead at 7:11 a.m. at Florida State Prison. When asked if he had any last words, White said "No, sir." He was originally scheduled to be executed in February 1984 but had been granted a reprieve.

On August 5, 2013, Ferguson was executed by lethal injection after spending thirty-five years on death row. He was pronounced dead at 6:17 p.m. and his last meal was a standard prison meal consisting of a meat patty with white bread, steamed tomatoes, potato salad, diced carrots, and iced tea. His execution was repeatedly delayed following years of appeals over his sanity, with his attorneys arguing that he was severely mentally ill and had succumbed to delusions and hallucinations, including a belief that he would rise up after his execution to fight alongside Jesus and save America from a communist plot. His final statement was "I just want everyone to know that I am the Prince of God and I will rise again."

== See also ==
- Capital punishment in Florida
- List of people executed in Florida
- List of people executed in the United States in 1985
- List of people executed in the United States in 1987
- List of people executed in the United States in 2013
- List of serial killers in the United States
- 2013 Hialeah shooting
- 2021 Hialeah shooting

Executions carried out in Florida
Preceded by Johnny Paul Witt March 6, 1985	Marvin Francois; May 29, 1985	Succeeded by Daniel Morris Thomas April 15, 1986
Executions carried out in the United States
Preceded by Jesse De La Rosa – Texas May 15, 1985	Marvin Francois – Florida; May 29, 1985	Succeeded by Charles Milton – Texas June 25, 1985
Executions carried out in Florida
Preceded by Ronald John Michael Straight May 20, 1986	Beauford White; August 28, 1987	Succeeded by Willie Darden March 15, 1988
Executions carried out in the United States
Preceded by Sterling J. Rault Jr. – Louisiana August 24, 1987	Beauford White – Florida; August 28, 1987	Succeeded by Wayne Eugene Ritter – Alabama August 28, 1987
Executions carried out in Florida
Preceded by William Edward Van Poyck June 12, 2013	John Errol Ferguson; August 5, 2013	Succeeded by Marshall Lee Gore October 1, 2013
Executions carried out in the United States
Preceded by Douglas Alan Feldman – Texas July 31, 2013	John Errol Ferguson – Florida; August 5, 2013	Succeeded by Anthony Rozelle Banks – Oklahoma September 10, 2013
