= Manuel Pardo (serial killer) =

American serial killer (1956–2012)

Manuel Pardo Jr.
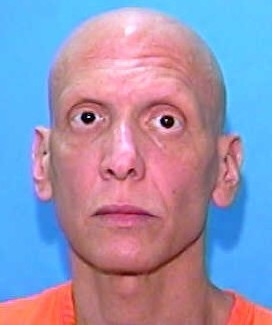
- Police mugshot
- Born: September 24, 1956; New York, U.S.
- Died: December 11, 2012 (aged 56); Florida State Prison, Florida, U.S.
- Other names: "Manny"; The Death Row Romeo
- Status: Executed by lethal injection
- Motive: Eliminating competition in the illegal drug market
- Conviction: First degree murder (9 counts)
- Penalty: Death

Details
- Victims: 9
- Span of crimes: January – April 1986
- Country: United States
- State: Florida
- Date apprehended: May 7, 1986

Manuel "Manny" Pardo Jr. (September 24, 1956 – December 11, 2012) was an American serial killer and former police officer previously employed by the Florida Highway Patrol and the Sweetwater Police Department. Between January and April 1986, he killed nine known victims. He was convicted on nine counts of first degree murder, for which he was sentenced to death; he was executed in December 2012 by lethal injection.

== Early life and police career ==
Manuel Pardo was born in New York on September 24, 1956. A former Boy Scout and Marine Corps veteran, Pardo began his law enforcement career with the Florida Highway Patrol, graduating valedictorian from the academy. However, he was fired from that agency in 1979 for falsifying traffic tickets. Pardo was soon hired by the police department in Sweetwater, Florida, located in Miami-Dade County.

== Criminal career and trial ==
After some brushes with law enforcement, including one incident involving lying to investigators, Pardo's position at the Sweetwater Police Department was terminated. Pardo became involved in the drug trade and, in January 1986, killed his first two known victims, Mario Amador and Roberto Alonso, with a .22 caliber Ruger pistol during a robbery.

Later that month, Pardo killed Michael Millot, a Haitian anti-Duvalier activist, who he believed to be a police informant. Millot was a gunsmith who had previously supplied Pardo with silencers for his handguns. Pardo's partner from the Sweetwater police, Rolando Garcia, lured Millot to a car belonging to Pardo's wife, where Pardo himself was already waiting in the back seat. Once Millot arrived and became situated in the front passenger seat of the car, Pardo fatally shot him in the head with a 9mm pistol. The car was later discovered to have been reupholstered.

In February 1986, Pardo killed Luis Robledo and Ulpiano Ledo during a robbery of their home. Two months later, Pardo claimed four victims in two separate incidents: Fara Quintero and Sara Musa were killed over an argument about a pawned ring worth $50 and for refusing to buy Pardo a VCR with stolen credit cards. Pardo later claimed that he believed Quintero had marked him for death by dialing him number 8s on a pager, a numerical sign for death in the Santería religion developed in Cuba. Ramon Alvero and his girlfriend Daisy Ricard were shot to death because Alvero had failed to show up to several drug deals.

Pardo was apprehended in a New York City hospital, where he was found with a gunshot wound to his foot. The bullet matched those found in his final victims. The injury occurred during the murder of Ricard when, after shooting her once, Pardo's Ruger pistol jammed. He then bludgeoned Ricard to death with the handgun, causing the jammed round to discharge into Pardo's foot.

When police searched Pardo's home, they discovered a collection of Nazi memorabilia. At the trial, prosecutors presented evidence that Pardo was a Nazi sympathizer who admired Adolf Hitler, and that Pardo harbored racist and antisemitic views regarding Jews and black people. Pardo maintained until his death that his mission was to rid Florida of its drug culture by killing active sellers and buyers of drugs, admitting to at least six of the nine murders.

During his trial, against the advice of his attorneys, Pardo testified in his own defense. He claimed, "I am a soldier. I accomplished my mission and I humbly ask you to give me the glory of ending my life and not send me to spend the rest of my days in state prison." Pardo "acknowledged that he killed all nine victims but claimed that all nine victims were drug dealers who had no right to live and that he was doing society a favor." Prosecuting attorney David Waxman, on the other hand, maintained that Pardo was a "cold-blooded killer" and, according to the Clark County Prosecutor's site, "The State presented the case that Pardo and Garcia were drug dealers and were eliminating the competition."

Garcia, whom Pardo said was not involved in the murders, was convicted of four counts of first degree murder and sentenced to death. However, he won a new trial in 2002. Garcia later pleaded guilty to four counts of second degree murder, received a 25-year sentence, and was released from prison on September 5, 2002.

For his final meal, Pardo ate rice, red beans, roasted pork, plantains, sliced avocados, tomato slices with olive oil, pumpkin pie, with egg nog and Cuban coffee.

Pardo was executed in Florida on December 11, 2012, by lethal injection, and was pronounced dead at 7:47 p.m. Manuel Pardo Jr. spent a total of 26 years on death row before his execution.

== In popular culture ==
In the 2015 shooter video game Hotline Miami 2: Wrong Number, one of the playable characters is an unhinged Miami Police Department homicide detective named Manny Pardo, loosely based on his real life namesake, who uses his authority to go on killing sprees.

There has been speculation that Dexter Morgan, a fictional serial killer and vigilante who works as a forensics technician at the Miami Police Department, was inspired in part by Pardo due to their resemblance, and their involvement in law enforcement to some degree before their murder sprees, and their vigilantism.

== See also ==
- List of people executed in Florida
- List of people executed in the United States in 2012
- List of serial killers in the United States
- Pedro Rodrigues Filho A Brazilian Vigilante Serial Killer who was also compared to Dexter Morgan prior to his death.

== Notes ==
Executions carried out in Florida
Preceded by David Alan Gore April 12, 2012	Manuel Pardo Jr. December 11, 2012	Succeeded by Larry Eugene Mann April 10, 2013
Executions carried out in the United States
Preceded by Richard Dale Stokley – Arizona December 5, 2012	Manuel Pardo Jr. – Florida; December 11, 2012	Succeeded by Robert Charles Gleason Jr. – Virginia January 16, 2013
