= Martin Grossman =

American murderer (1965–2010)

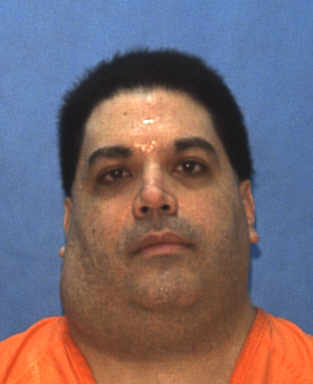
- Mug shot of Grossman
- Born: January 19, 1965
- Died: February 16, 2010 (aged 45); Florida State Prison, Florida, U.S.
- Status: Executed by lethal injection
- Motive: To avoid arrest
- Conviction: First degree murder
- Penalty: Death

Martin Edward Grossman (January 19, 1965 – February 16, 2010) was convicted of first degree murder for his part in the December 13, 1984, killing of wildlife officer Peggy Park. He was executed by lethal injection. In the days before his execution, there were a large number of appeals for clemency, ranging from petitions to pleas, as well as a request to halt the execution from Pope Benedict XVI. Grossman, a Jewish American, received strong support from national and international Jewish organizations for his death sentence to be commuted.

== Early life ==
Martin Edward Grossman was born on January 19, 1965. An only child, he grew up having to care for his mentally and physically ill father and uncle, a full-time responsibility which led to his dropping out of the ninth grade. His father died when he was 15 years old, followed shortly by his uncle, grandfather and other relatives. Grossman experienced severe depression and used alcohol and a variety of narcotics such as marijuana and PCP. He also took prescription drugs, including Valium and barbiturates, readily available in his mother's medicine cabinet. He was also well known as a very skilled driver.

== Murder ==
On December 13, 1984, Margaret "Peggy" Park, a 26-year-old wildlife officer, came across Grossman (then aged 19) and Thayne Taylor (aged 17) shooting a stolen handgun in a wooded area of Pinellas County, Florida. Grossman, who was on probation for grand theft and other charges after burglarizing a former girlfriend's house, asked her not to turn him in for possessing a weapon and being outside Pasco County. Both were violations of his probation.

As Park picked up her radio to call the sheriff's office, Grossman beat her on the head and shoulders with her flashlight. She was also beaten by Taylor. Park then managed to draw her gun and fire a warning shot. Grossman, a foot taller and 100 pounds heavier than Park, wrestled the gun away from her and shot her once in the back of the head. His arrest shocked family and friends who could not imagine he could be capable of such a crime.

Grossman was convicted of first-degree murder, the jury unanimously recommending the death penalty. Taylor was convicted of third-degree murder. He was released in community supervision after serving two years and 10 months of a seven-year prison term.

== Arguments for clemency ==
Supporters of Grossman alleged that his trial was improperly handled and that there was mitigating evidence to justify being granted clemency by Governor Charlie Crist, such as the influence of narcotics, and incompetence on the part of the legal teams. However, all appeals were denied, with the United States Supreme Court allowing the execution and upholding the opinion of the Florida Supreme Court that the trial was handled properly and that all evidence was allowed to be presented.

The defense originally hired psychologist Sidney Merin, PhD, to evaluate Grossman. However, the defense did not call Merin to the stand because his evaluation of Grossman was not favorable to Grossman's case.

After Grossman's conviction, the defense hired a second expert, North Carolina psychologist Rollin Bradshaw "Brad" Fisher Jr, PhD, to prepare a psychological report as part of Grossman's appeal of his conviction. Fisher wrote in his psychological report that testing on Grossman "did not reveal any signs of a current psychotic condition or of any major affective disorder."

As part of its post-conviction appeal, the defense claimed that a childhood evaluation of Grossman said he scored 77 on an IQ test: a score which borders on mental retardation. Grossman's lawyers also believed that the case was not properly demonstrated and that there was a lack of sufficient evidence. They also argued that Grossman was convicted of premeditated murder despite Grossman maintaining he had no intention of killing Park. On the day of the execution, a final appeal was made to the United States Supreme Court for a hearing; it was ruled that the execution may proceed.

=== Third-party appeals ===
Emails, faxes and letters were sent to the Governor of Florida Charlie Crist and to other prominent officials involved in the case. On the day of the execution nearly 50,000 calls, emails and letters were received by the office of the Governor urging him to grant clemency to Grossman. Additionally, over 35,000 signatures were gathered on a petition on Care2, a website, as a means to grant clemency to Grossman. Elie Wiesel, Holocaust survivor and activist, Pope Benedict XVI, Chief Rabbis of Israel, and over 200 prominent organizations sent letters to the Governor to plead against Grossman's execution. Crist declined to overturn the decision to execute Grossman.

== Execution ==
Grossman was executed by lethal injection at 6:00 p.m. EST on February 16, 2010. After being visited in the morning by an aunt and two female friends, he spent his final afternoon praying with his spiritual advisor, Rabbi Menachem Katz.

Grossman did not request a last meal, but ordered a chicken sandwich, a can of fruit punch, and banana cream and peanut butter cookies from the prison canteen before his execution.

In his final statement, Grossman said "I would like to extend my heartfelt remorse to the victim's family. I fully regret everything that occurred that night, for everything that was done, whether I remember it or not." He worked with Rabbi Dr Arthur Segal via mail with the process of Mussar Jewish Spiritual Renewal transformation. He recited the Jewish Shema prayer. He was pronounced dead at 6:19 p.m. Park's mother, sister, and brother traveled from out of state to witness the execution. Grossman was the 69th inmate executed in Florida since the United States Supreme Court reinstated the death penalty in 1976.

== See also ==
- List of people executed in Florida
- List of people executed in the United States in 2010

Executions carried out in Florida
Preceded by John Marek August 19, 2009	Martin Grossman; February 16, 2010	Succeeded by Manuel Valle September 28, 2011
Executions carried out in the United States
Preceded by Mark Aaron Brown – Ohio February 4, 2010	Martin Grossman – Florida; February 16, 2010	Succeeded by Michael Adam Sigala – Texas March 2, 2010
