= Murder of Rebecca Kunash =

1979 murder and rape of a young girl in Florida, United States

Rebecca Kunash
- Born: June 29, 1972; Florida, U.S.
- Died: May 11, 1979 (aged 6); Merritt Island, Florida, U.S.
- Cause of death: Death by drowning (homicide)
- Resting place: Brevard Memorial Park
- Other name: Becky
- Education: Audubon Elementary School
- Known for: Victim of a kidnapping, rape, and murder case

The murder of Rebecca Kunash (June 29, 1972 – May 11, 1979) occurred on May 11, 1979, in Brevard County, Florida, United States, when the six-year-old girl was abducted by then 20-year-old Bryan Frederick Jennings (December 9, 1958 – November 13, 2025), who forcibly took her to Merritt Island, where Jennings raped the girl. After the sexual assault, Jennings caused a skull fracture to Kunash by lifting her upside down and slamming her head to the ground, before he ultimately drowned the girl in a canal.

Jennings was found guilty of kidnapping, rape and first-degree murder. Following a trial in 1980 and two re-trials between 1982 and 1986, Jennings was eventually sentenced to death for the murder. More than 46 years after the rape-murder, Jennings, who had lost all his appeals, was executed on November 13, 2025.

== Murder ==
On May 11, 1979, in Brevard County, Florida, a six-year-old girl was kidnapped, raped and ultimately murdered by her abductor in a canal.

Early that morning, the girl, Rebecca "Becky" Kunash, was asleep in her bedroom, when 20-year-old Bryan Frederick Jennings, a member of the U.S. Marine Corps, climbed through her bedroom window and abducted her from her home. Jennings forced the girl into his car and drove to an area near a canal on Merritt Island. Jennings proceeded to rape the girl and afterwards, he lifted Kunash upside down by her feet, and slammed her head onto the ground, causing her skull to fracture. Subsequently, Jennings pinned the girl's head underwater at the canal for ten minutes, and Kunash died as a result of the drowning.

Sometime after, the body of Kunash was discovered inside the canal. Jennings was arrested later that same day for a traffic offense committed in Orange County, Florida. The police eventually connected him to the murder of Kunash and placed him under arrest for the murder, after they found his fingerprints in the girl's bedroom window, as well as his shoe print outside the same window. Jennings, who initially denied that he was responsible for the crime, eventually confessed to the police that he indeed killed Kunash.

== Trial of Bryan Jennings ==
=== Charges and trial ===
Bryan Jennings
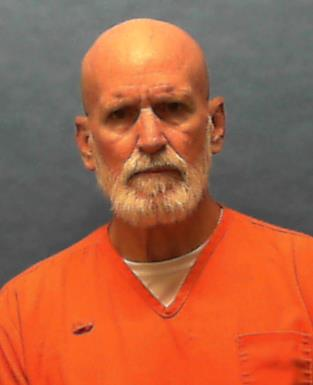
- Mug shot of Jennings
- Born: Bryan Frederick Jennings; December 9, 1958; Florida, U.S.
- Died: November 13, 2025 (aged 66); Florida State Prison, Raiford, Florida, U.S.
- Status: Executed by lethal injection
- Convictions: First degree murder Kidnapping; Burglary; Sexual battery
- Penalty: Death

Details
- Victims: 1
- Date: May 11, 1979
- Country: United States
- Location: Brevard County, Florida
- Imprisoned at: Florida State Prison

After his arrest, Bryan Jennings was charged with first-degree murder, kidnapping, rape and other offenses for the murder of Rebecca Kunash, with the prosecution officially seeking the death penalty for Jennings. In June 1979, a circuit judge ruled that the confession tape of Jennings should be admitted as evidence after finding that Jennings did not confess under duress.

Jennings stood trial before a Brevard County jury in February 1980. The taped confession was reportedly played in court, and a former cellmate of Jennings testified that he heard Jennings bragging about how he killed Kunash. Two fingerprint experts testified that his fingerprints were discovered at the girl's bedroom window. A psychiatrist testified that Jennings was not insane or mentally ill, but has a predatory character and a seriously flawed conscience.

Jennings was subsequently found guilty of first-degree murder, kidnapping, burglary, and sexual battery on February 7, 1980, and on February 11, 1980, the jury recommended the death penalty by a majority vote of 11–1.

On May 7, 1980, Circuit Court Judge Tom Waddell sentenced Jennings to death, in addition to four life sentences for the remaining charges.

=== Retrial ===
On April 8, 1982, the Florida Supreme Court allowed Jennings's appeal and ordered a retrial due to trial procedural errors.

The retrial took place before a different jury in July 1982. Kunash's parents, who came to court as witnesses, reportedly expressed that the retrial reopened their wounds and brought back the pain of losing their daughter.

On July 15, 1982, the jury once again found Jennings guilty of the original charges of first-degree murder, kidnapping, sexual battery, and burglary, although he was acquitted of one count of sexual battery. Shortly after the conviction of Jennings, his lawyers expressed that they would appeal.

On July 16, 1982, by a majority vote of 9–3, the jury recommended that Jennings should be given the death penalty for murdering Kunash. Prior to his formal sentencing, Jennings requested to be declared as a mentally disordered sex offender to gain eligibility for psychiatric treatment, but his request was denied by the trial judge.

On September 3, 1982, Circuit Court Judge Clarence Johnson formally imposed the death penalty for Jennings on the charge of first-degree murder, as well as three consecutive life sentences for the remaining charges of kidnapping, sexual battery, and burglary.

On July 12, 1984, the Florida Supreme Court rejected Jennings's second appeal.

=== Second retrial ===
In May 1985, the Florida Supreme Court heard Jennings's third appeal and once again allowed it, and ordered a second retrial on the grounds that his first retrial contained errors. Prior to the second retrial, Jennings's lawyers tried to seek the court's suppression of evidence they claimed was illegally obtained. In response to the 1985 retrial order, the family of Kunash stated that the horror and tragedy their family faced would not fade, and Kunash's father stated he expected the death penalty to be imposed at the end of the second retrial, and planned to witness the execution of his daughter's killer.

On March 24, 1986, Jennings stood trial for the third time, although the trial had to be moved from Brevard County to Bay County to avoid publicity and to ensure a more impartial trial. A jury was also selected on that same day. At that point, Kunash's parents divorced and they still struggled with the loss of their youngest daughter, which Kunash's father described as a nightmare that would not end.

On March 28, 1986, Jennings was convicted of the original charges for the third time after the jury found him guilty of the murder. Kunash's father reportedly urged the jury to impose the death penalty for Jennings. Prior to the sentencing trial, one of the jurors, a Navy gunner, was allowed to stay on the jury despite the Navy's request to remove him to enable him return for his official duties, resulting in a delay of his return to the Navy. Two psychiatrists also testified in the hearing that there were signs of improvement in Jennings's mental state, but that he was still self-destructive and had a high propensity to re-offend in terms of sexual offenses. One psychiatrist said that the killing may not have been premeditated, but the rape and abduction were both planned, and Jennings knew right from wrong.

On April 8, 1986, the jury recommended the death penalty by a majority vote of 11–1. On April 25, 1986, Circuit Court Judge Charles Harris formally sentenced Jennings to death for first-degree murder, marking the third time Jennings received the death sentence. Jennings was also given three life sentences for the remaining charges of sexual battery, burglary, and kidnapping.

== Appeal process ==
On August 27, 1987, the Florida Supreme Court dismissed Bryan Jennings's fourth appeal against his death sentence and murder conviction.

On June 13, 1991, the Florida Supreme Court rejected another appeal from Jennings.

On March 20, 1998, Circuit Judge Jere Lober denied Jennings's motion for a retrial.

On March 22, 2001, Jennings's sixth appeal was turned down by the Florida Supreme Court.

On September 29, 2005, U.S. District Judge Robert Hinkle rejected Jennings's federal appeal.

On July 3, 2007, Jennings's appeal to the 11th Circuit Court of Appeals was denied.

On March 31, 2008, the U.S. Supreme Court dismissed Jennings's final appeal and confirmed his death sentence.

On October 4, 2018, Jennings lost another appeal to the Florida Supreme Court. In his appeal, Jennings sought to have his sentence reviewed in light of the 2016 Hurst v. Florida decision by the U.S. Supreme Court and another decision by the Florida Supreme Court, which both ruled that only juries could decide on death sentences and that death sentences should be imposed by unanimous jury decisions (Jennings's sentence was passed by a vote of 11 to one). However, the appeal was rejected as the sentence was decided before June 2002, and the laws were not retroactive. Apart from this, the law requiring unanimity was subsequently abolished, with Florida Governor Ron DeSantis signing a new law to allow Florida's death sentences be imposed by agreement of at least eight jurors.

On July 22, 2024, the 11th Circuit Court of Appeals rejected Jennings's appeal.

== Death row and execution ==
=== 1989 execution stay ===
After his first sentencing in 1980, Bryan Jennings was incarcerated on death row at the Florida State Prison. By 2016, Jennings was the longest-serving death prisoner convicted of a murder offense in Florida's Brevard County.

Originally, Jennings was scheduled to be executed by the electric chair on October 27, 1989, after then Governor Bob Martinez signed his death warrant in September 1989. However, on October 26, 1989, the eve of Jennings's scheduled execution, he was granted a stay of execution by the Florida Supreme Court.

=== Execution in 2025 ===
On October 10, 2025, Florida Governor Ron DeSantis signed a death warrant for Jennings, scheduling his death sentence to be carried out on November 13, 2025.

After the death warrant was issued for Jennings, his lawyers prepared to file appeals to the Florida Supreme Court and the U.S. Supreme Court in an attempt to stave off his execution.

On October 29, 2025, Jennings appealed to the Florida Supreme Court for a stay of execution. The Attorney General James Uthmeier urged the court to allow the execution to move forward.

On November 7, 2025, the Florida Supreme Court denied Jennings's appeal. On November 12, 2025, the eve of his impending execution, Jennings's final appeal was also denied by the U.S. Supreme Court.

On November 13, 2025, 66-year-old Jennings was put to death by lethal injection at the Florida State Prison. The official time of death was 6:20 pm. Prior to his execution, Jennings ordered a last meal of one cheeseburger, fries, and a soda. He had no last words.

Jennings was the 16th death row prisoner from Florida to be executed in the state in 2025. Florida Governor Ron DeSantis, who became the governor that authorised the most number of executions in a year (breaking the previous record of eight in 2014), earlier defended the increased spate of executions, stating that "justice delayed is justice denied", on the account that most of the convicts were found guilty for "horrific" murders, and justice was to be served for the victims and their families after long decades of waiting for closure.

Nearing the end of 2025, Jennings was one of 19 Florida death row inmates executed in the United States that same year. Of all these 19 executed inmates, Jennings was noted to have spent the longest period on death row, having been sentenced 45 years prior in 1980 for the murder of Kunash.

== Aftermath ==
In 2013, Brevard County prosecutor Chris White described the murder of Kunash as one of the worst murder cases he ever prosecuted, and he revealed that Kunash's father died in 2001 while Kunash's mother moved out of the state and was still waiting for Jennings to be executed. White said he was frustrated with the long wait, and felt that the victim's mother deserved some closure. Junny Martinez, whose son was raped and murdered by Mark Dean Schwab (who was ultimately executed in 2008), expressed his sympathy for Kunash over her brutal death. Martinez added that he himself waited for more than 18 years for the execution of his son's murderer, and noted that the waiting period for Kunash's family lasted more than twice as long as his, which he found to be "unbelievable".

In 2015, childhood friends and classmates of Kunash banded together to commemorate her on a social media chat.

John Torres, a journalist for Florida Today, published an opinion piece in 2022, stating that the case of Kunash's murder was one of the worst murder cases he had ever known, and that Jennings deserved to be executed.

== See also ==
- Capital punishment in Florida
- List of people executed in Florida
- List of people executed in the United States in 2025

Executions carried out in Florida
Preceded by Norman Mearle Grim Jr. October 28, 2025	Bryan Frederick Jennings; November 13, 2025	Succeeded by Richard Barry Randolph November 20, 2025
Executions carried out in the United States
Preceded by Norman Mearle Grim Jr. – Florida October 28, 2025	Bryan Frederick Jennings – Florida; November 13, 2025	Succeeded by Stephen Corey Bryant – South Carolina November 14, 2025
