= Marshall Lee Gore =

Executed American murderer (1963–2013)

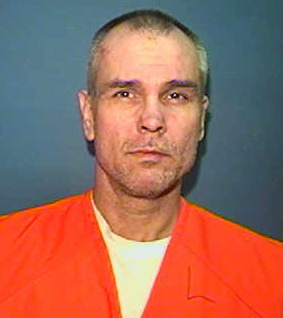
- Born: August 17, 1963; Chicago, Illinois, U.S.
- Died: October 1, 2013 (aged 50); Florida State Prison, Florida, U.S.
- Status: Executed by lethal injection
- Convictions: First degree murder (2 counts); Attempted first degree murder (2 counts); Kidnapping (3 counts); Armed robbery (3 counts); Sexual battery (2 counts); Burglary; Grand theft auto
- Penalty: Death x2, 7 life sentences plus 110 years

Details
- Victims: 2+
- Span of crimes: January 31 – March 15, 1988
- Country: United States
- State: Florida
- Date apprehended: March 17, 1988

Marshall Lee Gore (August 17, 1963 – October 1, 2013) was an American convicted murderer and rapist who was executed by the state of Florida for the 1988 murders of two women. He also raped and attempted to murder a third woman before kidnapping her two-year-old son. Gore was convicted, sentenced to death, and subsequently executed in 2013 at Florida State Prison by lethal injection.

== Early life ==
Gore was born on August 17, 1963, in Chicago, Illinois, and grew up in a troubled family. He was the second of five children born to Jimmy Joe Gore and Brenda McCurry Gore. His parents married in 1961 in Chicago, where Gore grew up. They later moved to the Miami area. The Gore family frequently got into trouble with the law. Jimmy Joe Gore was arrested on felony charges in three states. Some of Gore's siblings were also arrested for various offenses. Gore was arrested at least eight times for multiple offenses throughout the 1980s in Miami-Dade County, Florida. His parents' marriage fell apart in 1985 due to abuse and violence, with the couple officially getting a divorce in 1987. Gore stayed with his father in Florida and worked as a bouncer at a bar his father owned.

== Murders ==
On January 30, 1988, 19-year-old Susan Marie Roark, a Tennessee college student, disappeared. She was last seen alive with Gore leaving a trailer park in Bradley County, Tennessee. Roark phoned her grandmother and told her she was spending the night with a girlfriend in Cleveland. She said she would be home the following morning in time for church. The following day, Gore murdered her, inflicting trauma to her neck and chest. He then stole her car, a 1986 black Ford Mustang, and dumped her body off a forest road in Columbia County, Florida.

On February 14, he attacked a Miami waitress, raping and stabbing her. The waitress survived the attack, and Gore abandoned the stolen Mustang in Miami, where it was found the same day.

On March 11, 30-year-old Robyn Gayle Novick, a General Motors credit services representative from Lauderhill, who was working a brief stint moonlighting as a dancer, was seen leaving the parking lot of a tavern in her yellow Corvette. She was spotted leaving with a man who was later identified as Gore. Gore murdered Novick by stabbing her in the chest and tying a belt around her neck. He stole her car and dumped her body in a trash heap near Homestead. According to a medical examiner, the cause of death was mechanical asphyxia and stab wounds. The time of death was estimated between 9 p.m., March 11 and 1 a.m., March 12. Gore was spotted driving Novick's car, which police found abandoned hours later in Coral Gables.

On March 14, Gore abducted and attacked a third woman, 32-year-old Tina Corolis, who was an exotic dancer from Broward. He beat Corolis with a rock, raped, choked, and stabbed her. He then slit her throat with a knife and left her for dead by the side of a road near where he had dumped Novick's body. Gore then stole her car and drove off, taking her 2-year-old son Jimmy, who was still sitting in the back of the vehicle.

== Capture ==
Corolis survived the attack and alerted the police. Gore had fled the state and headed to Georgia, where he left Jimmy, locking him in the pantry of an abandoned barn before heading north towards Kentucky. On March 16, while police were searching for Jimmy, they came across Novick's body near where Corolis had been dumped. The same day Jimmy was found physically unharmed.

Gore was tracked to a trailer in Paducah, Kentucky, where he was captured on March 17, unarmed and without incident. Near the trailer, police found the Corolis' stolen car. After he was arrested, Gore was questioned about all three crimes. He initially denied knowing any of the women and claimed that he was Jimmy's biological father. Police showed him photos of Novick's body, which caused his eyes to fill with tears. He then reportedly said, "If I did this, I deserve the death penalty."

In April 1988, Columbia County deputies found Roark's body.

== Trial ==
At Gore's trial, he chose to represent himself. He was convicted of first-degree murder and armed robbery with a deadly weapon. The jury recommended that Gore be sentenced to death by a unanimous vote. Gore made frequent verbal outbursts during his trial and laughed out loud and howled.

In 1998, Gore won a new trial when the Supreme Court of Florida found that the prosecutor had asked him inappropriate questions during his initial trial. In 1999, following a second trial, the jury found him guilty, and he was sentenced to death again. In total, he received two death sentences, seven life sentences, and a further 110 years for his other crimes.

== Execution ==
Gore's execution was rescheduled a total of four times in 2013 alone. He was first scheduled to be executed on June 24, but it was halted because of questions about his sanity. It was rescheduled for July, but halted again due to sanity concerns. Governor Rick Scott then rescheduled the execution for September 10; however, Florida Attorney General Pam Bondi rescheduled the execution date so she could attend a political fundraiser. She later apologized for doing so. Scott then rescheduled the execution for October 1.

On October 1, 2013, Gore was executed via lethal injection at Florida State Prison. His last meal was just a can of Coca-Cola, as he rejected his original requested last meal of sausage and pepperoni pizza. He had no final words.

== See also ==
- Capital punishment in Florida
- Capital punishment in the United States
- List of people executed in Florida
- List of people executed in the United States in 2013
- List of serial killers in the United States

Executions carried out in Florida
Preceded by John Errol Ferguson August 5, 2013	Marshall Lee Gore; October 1, 2013	Succeeded by William Frederick Happ October 15, 2013
Executions carried out in the United States
Preceded by Arturo Eleazer Diaz – Texas September 26, 2013	Marshall Lee Gore – Florida; October 1, 2013	Succeeded by Edward Harold Schad Jr. – Arizona October 9, 2013
