= Final supper =

Final supper may mean:

- Last Supper, Final meal that, in the Gospel accounts, Jesus shared with his apostles in Jerusalem before his crucifixion
- Last meal, Meal preceding an execution
