= Murder of Elisa Nelson =

1980 abduction and murder of a young girl in Palm Harbor, Florida

Elisa Vera Nelson
- Born: July 7, 1970; Greenville, Michigan, U.S.
- Died: November 4, 1980 (aged 10); Palm Harbor, Florida, U.S.
- Cause of death: Fatal skull fracture (homicide)
- Other name: Lisa
- Education: Palm Harbor Middle School
- Known for: Victim of a kidnapping and murder case

On November 4, 1980, in Palm Harbor, Florida, ten-year-old Elisa Vera Nelson (July 7, 1970 – November 4, 1980) was kidnapped by Larry Eugene Mann (June 9, 1953 – April 10, 2013) while she was riding her bicycle to school. Mann forcibly brought Nelson to an orange grove, where he beat her, stabbed her and crushed her head with a concrete-encased pole. Mann, who was also a suspect in at least two or three unsolved homicides in Mississippi, was charged and convicted of the murder of Nelson, and ultimately sentenced to death and executed on April 10, 2013.

== Murder ==
On the morning of November 4, 1980, in Palm Harbor, Florida, ten-year-old Elisa Vera Nelson had just finished a dental appointment to have her braces put on when she began riding her bicycle to Palm Harbor Elementary School, where she attended fifth grade. About 100 yards from the campus, she encountered 27-year-old Larry Eugene Mann, who abducted her. Prior to the incident, Larry Eugene Mann was convicted of burglary in Mississippi in 1973, in which he forced a young girl to perform oral sex on him. He was sentenced to nine years in prison and was paroled in 1978 after serving four years.

After kidnapping Nelson, Mann threw her bicycle away in a ditch before driving away from the scene, forcibly took the girl to an orange grove near her school, where he severely beat her, and also stabbed her several times. Additionally, Mann wielded a concrete-encased pole to bludgeon Nelson on the head, which fractured her skull and in turn lead to her death. The body of Nelson was found the next day after her death, which brought shock to the semi-rural community in Palm Harbor. At the time of her death, Nelson was survived by her 12-year-old brother and parents.

On the afternoon of the same day he killed Nelson, Mann attempted to commit suicide, but he survived after the police intervened and took him to the hospital. Reportedly, Mann told the police officers that he had "done something stupid", and unbeknownst to the officers, he was referring to the murder of Nelson but they mistook it to mean his suicide attempt.

Four days after the murder, on November 8, 1980, while she was searching her husband's pickup truck for his spectacles, Mann's wife discovered a bloodstained handwritten note belonging to Nelson. The note was actually written by Nelson's mother to explain to her teacher why she was late to school. After the police received a report pertaining to the discovery, Mann was listed as a suspect, and the police was granted a warrant to search Mann's truck. Mann was arrested on November 10, 1980, two days after the killing. Fingerprint evidence additionally connected Mann to the crime as well.

== Trial of Larry Eugene Mann ==
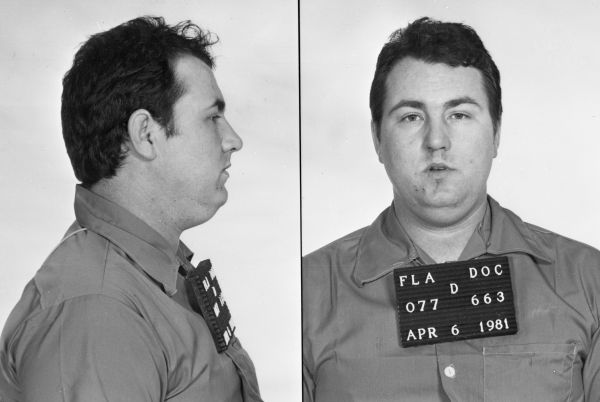
1981 Mugshot of Larry Eugene Mann

On November 10, 1980, Larry Mann was charged with the first-degree murder of Elisa Nelson.

On March 16, 1981, the murder trial of Mann began before a Pinellas County jury at the Pinellas County Circuit Court. In midst of the trial, the jurors were taken to visit the orange grove where the murder of Nelson took place.

On March 19, 1981, the jury found Mann guilty of kidnapping and murdering Nelson on both counts.

On March 20, 1981, a day after his conviction, the jury recommended the death penalty for Mann.

On March 26, 1981, Circuit Court Judge Philip A. Federico formally sentenced Mann to death by the electric chair for the first-degree murder of Nelson. Additionally, Judge Federico sentenced Mann to 99 years' imprisonment for the other charge of kidnapping Nelson. During sentencing, Judge Federico cited his agreement with the prosecution that the murder was "heinous, atrocious, and cruel" and that it warranted the full force of the law, and hence he imposed the death sentence for Mann.

== Re-sentencing and appeal processes ==
On September 2, 1982, the Florida Supreme Court vacated the death sentence of Eugene Mann and ordered a re-sentencing trial after they found that the trial judge had committed several errors during the original sentencing phase.

On January 14, 1983, Mann was sentenced to death a second time by the judge.

On May 24, 1984, the Florida Supreme Court dismissed Mann's appeal and upheld his second death sentence.

On January 14, 1985, the U.S. Supreme Court rejected Mann's appeal against his death sentence. In November 1985, Mann was one of five convicted murderers on Florida's death row who appealed to the state parole board for clemency.

Eventually, a death warrant was signed for Florida Governor Bob Graham, and Mann's execution date was scheduled for February 4, 1986. Mann's appeal for a stay of execution was rejected by the state courts. On February 3, 1986, the eve of Mann's scheduled execution, U.S. District Judge Elizabeth A. Kovachevich granted Mann's appeal and stayed the execution.

On May 14, 1987, upon his federal appeal, Mann's death sentence was overturned by the 11th U.S. Circuit Court of Appeals.

On February 6, 1990, a different jury once again recommended the death penalty for Mann. On March 2, 1990, Circuit Judge James R. Case sentenced Mann to death a third time for the murder of Nelson.

On April 2, 1992, Mann's appeal against his third death sentence was denied by the Florida Supreme Court.

On September 28, 2000, the Florida Supreme Court turned down Mann's appeal.

On July 12, 2001, Mann's appeal for a writ of habeas corpus was rejected by the Florida Supreme Court.

== Execution ==
On March 1, 2013, Florida Governor Rick Scott signed a new death warrant for Mann, scheduling his death sentence to be carried out on April 10, 2013.

On March 25, 2013, Mann's lawyers filed a final appeal to the Florida Supreme Court. On April 2, 2013, the Florida Supreme Court turned down Mann's appeal.

On April 9, 2013, the 11th U.S. Circuit Court of Appeals denied Mann's appeal.

On the afternoon of April 10, 2013, the date of the execution, the U.S. Supreme Court refused a final appeal from Mann. More than an hour after the appeal was rejected, 59-year-old Mann was put to death by lethal injection at the Florida State Prison. The official time of death was 7:19pm, 15 minutes after the drugs were administered to him. For his last meal, Mann ordered fried shrimp, fish and scallops, stuffed crabs, hot butter rolls, coleslaw, pistachio ice cream and Pepsi.

== Aftermath ==
=== Commemoration of the victim ===
Three decades after the murder of Nelson, the Palm Harbor Elementary School decided to name its mural and reading corner after Nelson to commemorate the girl.

The old campus of Palm Harbor Elementary School, where Nelson was murdered nearby, was closed in 2009. Eventually, a new elementary school was opened in its place and in 2019, the Pinellas County School Board decided to name the school Elisa Nelson Elementary, after the victim.

=== Mann's suspected connection to other murders ===
Apart from the murder of Nelson, Larry Mann was named a suspect behind at least three to four unsolved murders in Mississippi, which took place in the 1970s. These cases were noted to share similarities with the murder of Nelson.

On February 1, 1973, 13-year-old Rose Marie Levandoski was last seen going to the restroom at St. Martin Junior High School before she disappeared, and Levandoski's naked body was found three weeks later in a river near Biloxi. The cause of death was certified to be fatal stab wounds.

On September 24, 1975, 16-year-old Janie Sanders disappeared after walking home with her classmates in Pascagoula. On the same day of her disappearance, Sanders was found dead with stab wounds by a wildlife officer, and an autopsy report showed that she was raped by her attacker before being stabbed to death.

In December 1978, a 20-year-old clerk named Debra Gunter was kidnapped from her workplace at a convenience store in Gautier, and she was found dead five days later, also with fatal stab wounds.

In 1979, Clara Turk was abducted at a street not far away from the location where Sanders's corpse was found, and her body was found in a lake in Jackson County.

As of 2022, Mann was still named a suspect behind the unsolved murders of Janie Sanders, Debra Gunter, Rose Marie Levandoski and Clara Turk, although investigations into these murders suggested the possibility of another person being responsible for these homicides.

== See also ==
- Capital punishment in Florida
- List of people executed in Florida
- List of people executed in the United States in 2013

Executions carried out in Florida
Preceded by Manuel Pardo Jr. December 11, 2012	Larry Eugene Mann; April 10, 2013	Succeeded by Elmer Leon Carroll May 29, 2013
Executions carried out in the United States
Preceded by Rickey Lynn Lewis – Texas April 9, 2013	Larry Eugene Mann – Florida; April 10, 2013	Succeeded by Ronnie Paul Threadgill – Texas April 16, 2013
