= Murder of Jonathan Kushner =

1973 kidnapping, murder and rape of a young boy in Florida

Jonathan Kushner
- Born: Jonathan Mark Kushner; September 13, 1962; Hennepin County, Minnesota, U.S.
- Died: October 28, 1973 (aged 11); Tampa, Florida, U.S.
- Cause of death: Murder by suffocation
- Resting place: Rodeph Sholom Cemetery
- Occupation: Student
- Relatives: David Kushner (Brother)

On October 28, 1973, 11-year-old Jonathan Mark Kushner (September 13, 1962 – October 28, 1973), the son of a dean at the University of South Florida, was abducted by two men while on his way back home from buying candy for his younger brother. Kushner was thereafter raped and murdered by his kidnappers, Johnny Paul Witt (January 13, 1943 – March 6, 1985) and Gary Tillman (born April 23, 1954). The pair were arrested after Witt's wife reported them to the police, and subsequently charged with Kushner's murder, which shocked the community and state at the time. Witt was convicted of first-degree murder, sentenced to death and executed by electrocution on March 6, 1985. Tillman pleaded guilty to the murder and was sentenced to life imprisonment due to his schizophrenic condition.

== Murder ==
On October 28, 1973, an 11-year-old boy was kidnapped, raped and murdered by two men in Tampa, Florida.

On that date, 11-year-old Jonathan Mark Kushner, whose father was a dean at the University of South Florida, was cycling back home after going to a nearby convenience store to buy candy for his younger brother. On the way, he encountered two men – 30-year-old Johnny Paul Witt and 19-year-old Gary Tillman – who were waiting to abduct a child to kill. Both Witt and Tillman grabbed Kushner and the latter also struck Kushner on the head with a star bit from a drill. The pair gagged Kushner, before they locked him in the trunk of Witt's car and drove to an orange grove.

After reaching the grove, the men discovered that Kushner had suffocated and died due to the gag. Undeterred, the pair sexually abused the boy's corpse several times, before Witt mutilated the boy's body with a knife. Subsequently, the men dug a shallow grave and disposed of Kushner's body in the grave. Meanwhile, alarmed by the disappearance of their son, Kushner's parents filed a police report and reported Kushner missing. At the time of his death, Kushner left behind two brothers and his parents.

Eight days later, Witt's wife reported to the police that her husband and Tillman had actually murdered the boy. This led to the arrest of the pair for the murder of Kushner.

== Charges and trials ==
=== Indictment ===
On November 8, 1973, a grand jury formally indicted both Witt and Tillman for the first-degree murder of Kushner.

The men were also suspected to be involved in the disappearance of 13-year-old girl named Gail Joiner, who was last seen in September 1972 before she went missing. Due to the similarities between the case of Joiner's disappearance and the murder of Kushner, the authorities reopened the Joiner case for investigations in November 1973.

On November 9, 1973, both Tillman and Witt pleaded not guilty to the murder charges.

=== Trial proceedings ===
Johnny Witt

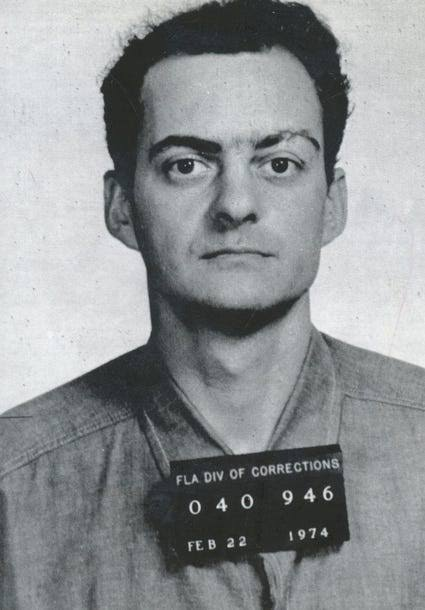
Johnny Paul Witt

On February 18, 1974, Johnny Witt was the first of the pair to stand trial for the murder of Jonathan Kushner.

On February 21, 1974, Witt was found guilty of first-degree murder, and sentenced to death by Judge Herboth S. Ryder upon the jury's recommendation for capital punishment.

Gary Tillman

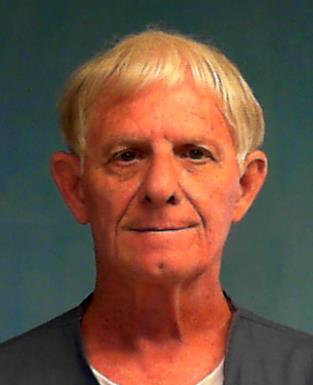
Gary Tillman

On May 6, 1974, Gary Tillman, the co-perpetrator of Kushner's murder, pleaded guilty to the boy's murder through a plea agreement with the prosecution. As a result, the death penalty was taken off the table and Tillman was sentenced to life imprisonment.

According to sources, Tillman was diagnosed with schizophrenia and was expected to pursue an insanity defense if his case went to trial with the death penalty on the table. In light of this, prosecutors chose not to seek capital punishment and instead negotiated a plea deal. This ensured Tillman would be sentenced to life in prison for Kushner's murder, rather than risk a successful insanity defense that could have led to his confinement in a mental institution — with the possibility of early release.

== Appeals of Witt ==
On February 3, 1977, the Florida Supreme Court turned down Witt's direct appeal against his death sentence.

On October 31, 1977, Witt's appeal was denied by the U.S. Supreme Court.

In October 1979, Witt and two other condemned inmates petitioned for clemency from Florida Governor Bob Graham. These hearings were held in November 1979, with each of the trio's lawyers seeking to commute their clients' death sentences to life imprisonment.

In January 1980, Governor Graham ordered Witt to undergo psychiatric examination before he could set an execution date. Subsequently, in April 1980, Governor Graham signed a death warrant for Witt and scheduled his execution date as May 21, 1980. However, a stay of execution was granted a week before Witt was due to be executed.

On June 17, 1981, U.S. District Judge George C. Carr affirmed Witt's death sentence and dismissed his appeal.

In June 1983, the 11th Circuit Court of Appeals allowed Witt's appeal and overturned his death sentence, ruling that he should receive a re-sentencing hearing. The decision, however, was withdrawn two months later in August 1983.

Subsequently, the 11th Circuit Court of Appeals revoked the death sentence of Witt on the grounds of the trial court's disqualification of one potential juror. However, in May 1984, the prosecution appealed to the U.S. Supreme Court and sought to restore Witt's death sentence.

On January 21, 1985, by a majority decision of 7–2, the U.S. Supreme Court reinstated the death sentence of Witt, finding that it was appropriate to disqualify a juror candidate whose beliefs could possibly hinder a fair verdict in capital cases, and thus overturned the lower court's ruling.

== Execution of Witt ==
After exhausting his appeals, Johnny Witt's death warrant was signed by then Governor Bob Graham in February 1985, and his death sentence was set to be carried out on March 6, 1985.

In a final bid to escape the death sentence, Witt filed last-minute appeals to stave off his execution. On March 1, 1985, a federal district judge rejected Witt's appeal.

On March 4, 1985, the Florida Supreme Court dismissed Witt's appeal.

On March 4, 1985, the 11th Circuit Court of Appeals rejected Witt's appeal.

On March 5, 1985, the eve of his execution, Witt filed a final appeal to the U.S. Supreme Court, arguing that his Sixth and Fourteenth Amendment rights were both violated due to the trial court unconstitutionally picked out a jury to try his case and exclude jurors whose personal or religious beliefs could influence their decision of guilty or not guilty toward capital punishment. However, the U.S. Supreme Court upheld the death sentence and rejected Witt's appeal, finding that Witt's constitutional rights were not violated and the trial judge had the right to ask a juror to step down should his/her beliefs could affect the verdict of the trial in any way. This appeal of Witt, titled Wainwright v. Witt became a landmark case as it allowed judges to decide if jurors' personal beliefs or attitudes towards the death penalty would prevent or substantially impair their ability to decide on the defendant's guilt and/or sentence fairly.

On March 6, 1985, 42-year-old Johnny Paul Witt was put to death by the electric chair. Prior to his execution, Witt declined to make a final statement, and he also turned down a special last meal offer. However, he accepted an omelet, rolls and coffee, which he barely touched.

== Incarceration of Tillman ==
As of 2025, Gary Tillman, the other offender of the Kushner murder case, is incarcerated at the Graceville Correctional Facility.

Under Florida's previous laws, any prisoners sentenced to life between 1972 and 1994 were entitled to be assessed for parole after serving at least 25 years out of their respective life sentences, and Tillman's case was first forwarded for a parole hearing before the Florida Parole Commission in June 1997. Subsequently, at the end of the hearing, the parole board decided to set a tentative release date in 2100 for Tillman, ensuring that Tillman would die in prison before he could be paroled, even though his case would still be periodically heard by the parole board every two years.

== Aftermath ==
A 2008 news article reported that Johnny Witt was one of six murderers notably executed for the rape and murder of children in Florida.

Dr. Gilbert Kushner (born July 7, 1933), the father of Jonathan Kushner, died from complications of lung cancer at the age of 76 on May 30, 2010.

In 2016, 43 years after the murder of his older brother, David Kushner — who was just four years old at the time — published Alligator Candy: A Memoir, a book recounting the events surrounding the tragedy. In the memoir, David detailed his efforts to investigate his brother's case beyond what his parents had shared with him. He initially believed he was the last person to see his brother alive, having asked him to go out and buy a piece of candy called "Alligator Candy" — a gum sold in a plastic alligator-shaped container — the same candy that inspired the book’s title. However, his father later told him this memory was inaccurate: he, not David, had been the last to see Kushner alive, and the candy had not been found among his son's belongings. Years later, a retired police detective confirmed that Kushner had indeed bought the candy for David — it had been stolen by the killer, Witt, and given to his own son. The murder deeply affected the Kushner family, leaving his parents and two surviving brothers with lasting emotional trauma. For many years, his parents avoided speaking about their son's death.

In 2023, seven years after publishing Alligator Candy, David made a six-episode podcast about his brother's murder.

== See also ==
- Capital punishment in Florida
- List of people executed in Florida
- List of people executed in the United States in 1985
