= Carol City, Florida =

Carol City
- Neighborhood of Miami Gardens
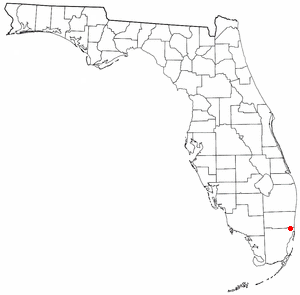
- Location in the state of Florida
- Coordinates: 25°56′32″N 80°16′12″W
- Country: United States
- State: Florida
- County: Miami-Dade
- City: Miami Gardens, Florida

Area
  - Total: 7.7 sq mi (20.0 km^{2})
  - Land: 7.6 sq mi (19.7 km^{2})
  - Water: 0.12 sq mi (0.3 km^{2})

Population (2000)
  - Total: 59,443
  - Density: 7,820/sq mi (3,020/km^{2})
- Time zone: UTC-5 (Eastern (EST))
  - Summer (DST): UTC-4 (EDT)
- ZIP codes: 33055-33056
- Area code: 305
- FIPS code: 12-10650

Carol City is a neighborhood in Miami Gardens, Florida, United States. It was formerly listed as a census-designated place in the 2000 U.S. census.

== History ==
Julius Gaines, the developer, had originally planned to name it Coral City. However, under threat of a lawsuit by Coral Gables, he changed the name, switching the O and A.

In the 1960s, much of Carol City included farmland. As the decades progressed, many people in Miami Gardens blamed the public housing in the area, including the developments around Carol City High School, of importing crime and recreational drugs into the area. In 2007, Mayor Shirley Gibson of Miami Gardens announced she would not allow any more public housing projects to open in Miami Gardens.

On July 27, 1977, six people were killed and a further two were injured during a mass shooting at a house in Carol City. At the time, the shooting was the largest case of mass murder in Miami-Dade County history.

== Geography ==
Carol City is located at 25°56′32″N 80°16′12″W (25.942121, -80.269920). According to the United States Census Bureau, the community has a total area of 20.0 km^{2} (7.7 sq mi). 19.7 km^{2} (7.6 sq mi) of it is land and 0.3 km^{2} (0.12 sq mi) of it (1.42%) is water.

== Notable people ==
- Carl Hart - Psychologist and neuroscientist
- Rick Ross - Rapper
- Flo Rida - Rapper
- Gunplay - Rapper
- Spaceghostpurrp - Rapper
- Bigg D - Record producer
- Denzel Curry - Rapper
- PlayThatBoiZay - Rapper
- Santana Moss - Former NFL Player
- Jo Marie Payton - American Actress

== Demographics ==
Historical population
Census	Pop.	Note	%±
1960	21,749		—
1970	27,361		25.8%
1980	47,349		73.1%
1990	53,331		12.6%
2000	59,443		11.5%
U.S. Decennial Census; 1990 2000

=== 2000 census ===
Carol City CDP, Florida – Racial and ethnic composition Note: the US Census treats Hispanic/Latino as an ethnic category. This table excludes Latinos from the racial categories and assigns them to a separate category. Hispanics/Latinos may be of any race.
Race / Ethnicity (NH = Non-Hispanic)	Pop 2000	% 2000
White alone (NH)	3,798	6.39%
Black or African American alone (NH)	29,560	49.73%
Native American or Alaska Native alone (NH)	65	0.11%
Asian alone (NH)	317	0.53%
Pacific Islander alone (NH)	22	0.04%
Other race alone (NH)	101	0.17%
Mixed race or Multiracial (NH)	615	1.03%
Hispanic or Latino (any race)	24,965	42.00%
Total	59,443	100.00%

As of the census of 2000, there were 59,443 people, 16,402 households, and 14,089 families residing in the community. The population density was 3,012.0 people/km^{2} (7,801 people/mi^{2}). There were 17,049 housing units at an average density of 863.9 units/km^{2} (2,237 units/mi^{2}). The racial makeup of the CDP was 52.10% African American, 38.11% White (6.4% were Non-Hispanic White,). 0.55% Asian, 0.19% Native American, 0.04% Pacific Islander, 5.53% from other races, and 3.48% from two or more races. Hispanic or Latino of any race were 42.00% of the population.

There were 16,402 households, out of which 42.7% had children under the age of 18 living with them, 52.4% were married couples living together, 26.5% had a female householder with no husband present, and 14.1% were non-families. 10.8% of all households were made up of individuals, and 2.6% had someone living alone who was 65 years of age or older. The average household size was 3.58 and the average family size was 3.75.

In the area the population was spread out, with 31.0% under the age of 18, 9.7% from 18 to 24, 28.6% from 25 to 44, 22.4% from 45 to 64, and 8.2% who were 65 years of age or older. The median age was 32 years. For every 100 females, there were 92.5 males. For every 100 females age 18 and over, there were 87.1 males.

The median income for a household in the community was $38,652, and the median income for a family was $39,596. Males had a median income of $26,079 versus $22,169 for females. The per capita income for the community was $12,600. About 14.3% of families and 16.5% of the population were below the poverty line, including 21.5% of those under age 18 and 18.2% of those age 65 or over.

As of 2000, before being annexed to Miami Gardens, English as a first language accounted for 53.73% of all residents, Spanish accounted for 43.16%, and French Creole made up 2.15% of the population.

As of 2000, the Carol City section of Miami Gardens had the twenty-seventh highest percentage of Cuban residents in the US, with 18.75% of the populace. It had the nineteenth highest percentage of Jamaican residents in the U.S. at 5.80% (which tied with Lake Park, Florida,) and the thirty-ninth highest percentage of Dominican residents in the U.S. at 3% of its population. It had the fifty-sixth most Haitians in the U.S. at 2.50% (tied with five other areas in the U.S., including Plantation and Taft, Florida) while it had the twentieth highest percentage of Nicaraguans at 2.20% of all residents. The Carol City neighborhood of Miami Gardens is home to the seventieth highest percentage of Colombian residents in the U.S. at 2.15% of the population.

== Education ==
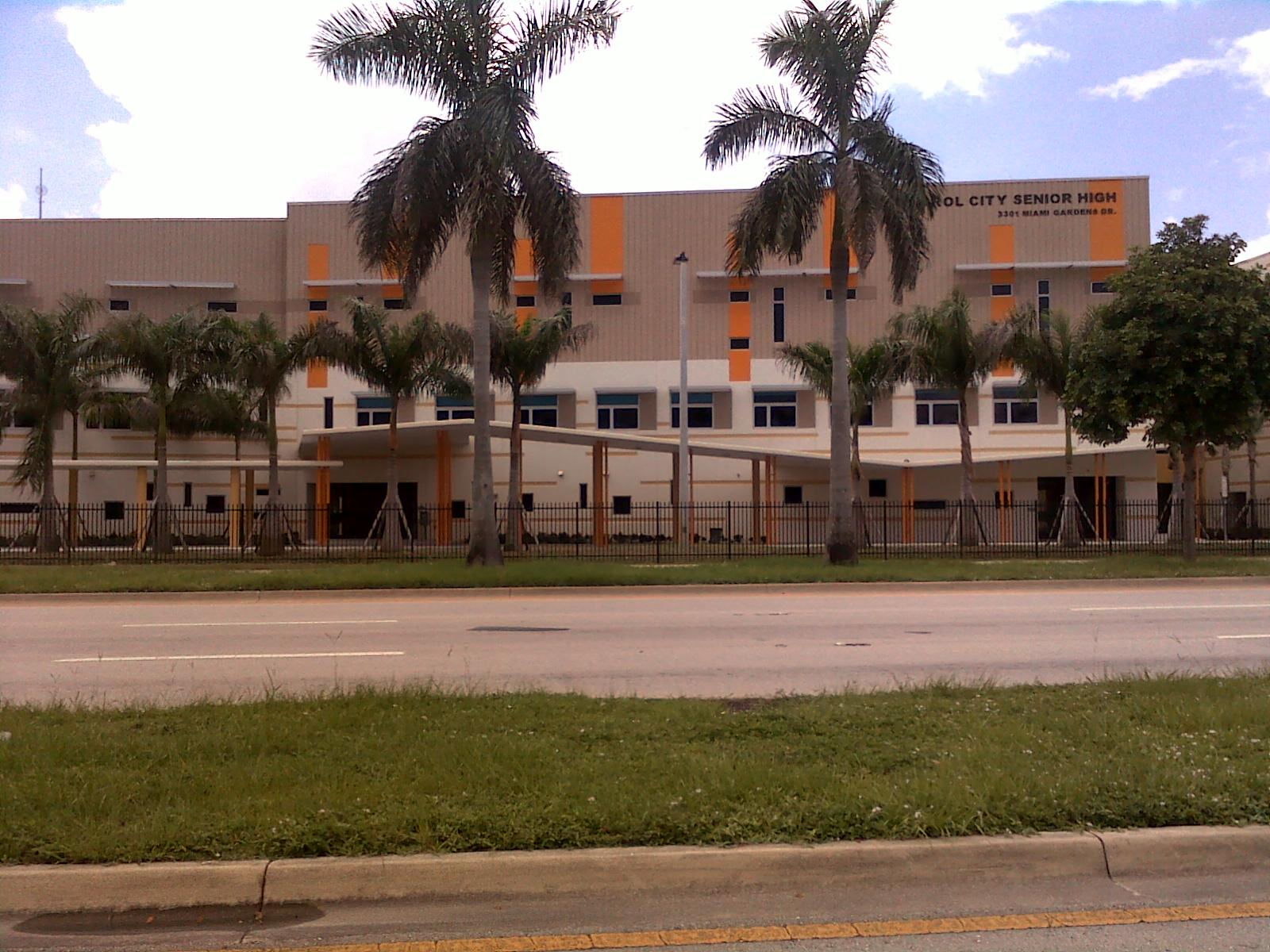
Miami Carol City High School

Carol City is within the Miami-Dade Public Schools district.

Elementary schools within the former CDP that are now in Miami Gardens include Brentwood, Carol City, Barbara Hawkins, Miami Gardens, Myrtle Grove, and Skyway. Elementary schools within the former CDP that are in unincorporated areas include Lake Stevens, North Glade, and Charles David Wyche Jr.

Carol City Middle School is located in Miami Gardens and in the former CDP. Lake Stevens Middle School is located in an unincorporated area and in the former CDP. Miami Carol City High School is located within Miami Gardens and in the former Carol City CDP. It opened in fall 1963.

The North Campus of Sandor Weiner School of Opportunity, a charter school, is located in the former CDP and in an unincorporated area.

The Roman Catholic Archdiocese of Miami formerly operated the Saint Monica School in the Carol City CDP.

== See also ==
- List of geographic names derived from anagrams and ananyms
