= Murder of Trisa Thornley =

1978 abduction and murder of a young girl in Florida

Trisa Gail Thornley
- Trisa Thornley
- Born: July 27, 1969; Florida, U.S.
- Died: January 23, 1978 (aged 8); Ocala, Florida, U.S.
- Cause of death: Strangulation
- Resting place: Highland Memorial Park
- Education: Eighth Street Elementary School
- Known for: Victim of a kidnapping and murder case

The murder of Trisa Gail Thornley (July 27, 1969 – January 23, 1978) occurred in Ocala, Florida, on January 23, 1978. Trisa, then an eight-year-old third grade student, was abducted and murdered by her family friend, a prison officer named Aubrey Dennis Adams Jr. (January 4, 1958 – May 4, 1989), and her body was found two months later in a remote forest in March 1978. Adams was convicted of first-degree murder and sentenced to death on January 16, 1979. Adams's appeals were all dismissed and he was executed by the electric chair on May 4, 1989.

== Murder ==
On January 23, 1978, a young girl was kidnapped, raped and murdered by a family friend in Ocala, Florida.

Eight-year-old Trisa Gail Thornley, a third-grade student, was walking back home from school when she encountered 20-year-old Aubrey Dennis Adams Jr., a prison officer of Marion Correctional Institution who was a friend of Thornley's family. Adams reportedly offered to give Thornley a ride, and Thornley entered the car. During the journey, Adams had attempted to molest and rape Thornley, who was ultimately strangled to death during the sexual abuse attempt itself. After murdering the girl, Adams removed Thornley's clothes, and disposed of her body in a remote forest.

On March 15, 1978, nearly two months after her death, Thornley's body was discovered by a trio of men hunting for gophers in the same forest. At the time of the discovery, Thornley was stripped naked, rope was tied around her hands, and she was covered with plastic bags. An autopsy report confirmed that the cause of Thornley's death was strangulation, although another forensic expert did not rule out the possibility of manual suffocation.

Adams was arrested as a suspect after police linked him to an obscene phone call made to Thornley's family after her disappearance and death.

== Trial of Aubrey Dennis Adams Jr. ==
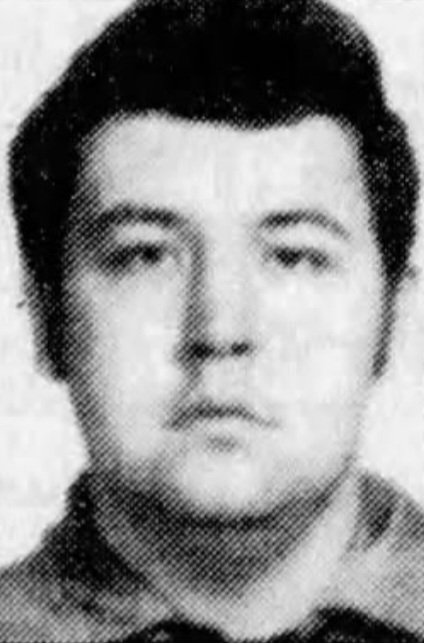
Aubrey Dennis Adams Jr.

On March 17, 1978, 20-year-old Aubrey Adams Jr. was charged with the murder of Trisa Thornley.

On August 30, 1978, the trial date of Adams was scheduled for October 9, 1978. That same month, the trial of Adams was relocated to Lake County due to the publicity surrounding the case in Marion County.

On October 20, 1978, Adams was found guilty of first-degree murder by the jury after it spent 90 minutes to decide on the verdict.

On October 27, 1978, the jury recommended the death penalty for Adams. A formal sentencing hearing was set for January 16, 1979.

On January 16, 1979, Adams was sentenced to death via the electric chair by Circuit Judge William F. Edwards.

== Appeals ==
On February 11, 1982, the Florida Supreme Court dismissed Adams's direct appeal against his death sentence.

On October 4, 1982, the U.S. Supreme Court turned down Adam's appeal against his death sentence.

On August 20, 1984, Florida Governor Bob Graham signed a death warrant for Adams, scheduling him to be executed on September 19, 1984. An appeal to the Florida Supreme Court was denied on September 11, 1984, but the execution was eventually delayed due to legal reasons.

On June 17, 1985, the 11th Circuit Court of Appeals turned down Adams' appeal.

On February 5, 1986, Adams' second death warrant was signed, scheduling his execution date as March 4, 1986. Coincidentally, Ted Bundy, one of the United States' most notorious serial killers, was scheduled to be executed on the same date as Adams. However, the execution date for Bundy was postponed, and Bundy was eventually put to death by the electric chair on January 24, 1989.

On January 13, 1986, the U.S. Supreme Court rejected Adam's appeal.

On February 28, 1986, the U.S. Supreme Court refused to stay Adams' execution and dismissed his appeal. Subsequently, just 13 hours before the death sentence was due to be carried out, Adams' execution date was again delayed, after the U.S. Supreme Court granted a stay of execution pending another appeal.

On March 7, 1986, U.S. District Judge John H. Moore II denied Adams' appeal. On March 30, 1986, the U.S. Supreme Court vacated the stay order, paving way for another potential execution date to be set for Adams.

On November 14, 1986, the 11th Circuit Court of Appeals allowed Adams' appeal and remitted his case back to the lower courts for re-sentencing.

On March 7, 1988, the 11th Circuit Court of Appeals agreed to reconsider reinstating the death sentence of Adams.

On February 28, 1989, the U.S. Supreme Court restored Adams' death sentence.

== Execution ==
On April 18, 1989, Florida Governor Bob Martinez signed a new death warrant for Adams, scheduling him to be executed on May 4, 1989.

In a final bid to avoid his execution, Adams filed a series of last-minute appeals to the state and federal courts to delay the execution. Citrus County Circuit Judge William F. Edwards dismissed Adams's appeal on April 28, 1989. Afterwards, Adams appealed to the Florida Supreme Court on April 30, 1989. The Florida Supreme Court subsequently dismissed the appeal on May 3, 1989, and a follow-up federal appeal was denied by U.S. District Judge John H. Moore II the same day. Later that night, the 11th Circuit Court of Appeals also rejected another appeal from Adams. In the end, by a majority vote of 7–2, the U.S. Supreme Court dismissed Adams' final appeal.

On May 4, 1989, 31-year-old Aubrey Dennis Adams Jr. was put to death by the electric chair at the Florida State Prison. He was pronounced dead at 7:09am, five minutes after the electric chair was switched on. For his last meal, Adams ordered one pound of popcorn shrimp, one pound of medium-size shrimp, one pound of jumbo shrimp (battered and fried), one loaf of garlic bread, french fries, pecan pie, pecan ice cream, and iced tea.

At the time of Adams' execution, 15 of his family members and friends stood outside the prison. A group of ten protesters also rallied outside the prison to show opposition to Adams' execution. Simultaneously, the family of the murdered girl Trisa Thornley gathered outside the prison to await the news of Adam's execution, and they applauded after it was confirmed by witnesses of the execution itself.

20 years after Adams' execution, in 2009, Kelley Harriss, who was Thornley's former classmate, stated in an interview that her last memory of her late friend before her disappearance and murder was that they played a game of school, with Thornley being the teacher and Harriss being the student. She recounted that the last day she spent with Thornley was a happy one.

A 2008 news article reported that Aubrey Adams Jr. was one of six murderers notably executed for the murder of children in Florida.

== See also ==
- Capital punishment in Florida
- List of people executed in Florida
- List of people executed in the United States in 1989
