= Murder of Susan Morris =

1993 murder and rape of a college student in Florida

- Susan Moris photographed on December 25, 1992, 17 days before her death.
- Location: University of West Florida, Florida, US
- Date: January 11, 1993
- Attack type: Murder and rape
- Deaths: Susan Leigh Morris, 21
- Perpetrator: Eric Scott Branch
- Verdict: Guilty on all counts
- Convictions: First-degree murder Auto theft Sexual battery
- Sentence: Death

On January 11, 1993, 21-year-old Susan Leigh Morris (born April 9, 1971 - January 11, 1993), a University of West Florida student, was attacked, raped and murdered by a man named Eric Scott Branch (February 7, 1971 – February 22, 2018), who wanted to steal her car in order to travel out of Florida and return to his native state of Indiana, and the body was found in a shallow grave near her campus in Pensacola, Florida. Branch, who was also involved in two sexual assault cases, one in Indiana and one in Florida, was arrested and charged with first-degree murder. He was found guilty, sentenced to death and executed by lethal injection on February 22, 2018.

== Murder ==
On January 11, 1993, after attending her evening class, 21-year-old Susan Leigh Morris, a student majoring in television production at the University of West Florida, was walking to her red Toyota car when she was attacked by 21-year-old Eric Scott Branch, who wanted to steal her vehicle in order to escape from Florida. Branch had been convicted of raping a 14-year-old girl near the University of Southern Indiana campus in 1991, but he was mistakenly released from a county jail on November 1, 1992, and he also raped a female community college student in Panama City, Florida on January 1, 1993.

After he kidnapped Morris, Branch took her to the forest near the campus, where he raped, beat, and killed her. Branch left the body in the woods and drove off in Morris's car. Morris's body was not found until two days later, on January 13, 1993, when the police conducted a search for the missing student. Morris's body was covered with bruises and lacerations, and her eyes were swollen shut. A broken piece of wood was embedded in her vagina.

An autopsy report revealed that Morris was being beaten, stomped and strangled by her attacker. Her voice box was fractured as a result of stomping or manual strangulation, and a sock was tied around her neck, likely to control her rather than to strangle her. The medical examiner also certified that Morris's mouth and face were severely bruised, likely by blunt force blows or kicking. Morris's car was found abandoned in a Kentucky parking lot on January 12, 1993.

== Charges ==
After the murder, the police identified Eric Branch as a suspect and began to search for him. On January 15, 1993, Branch, who had returned home to Indiana, surrendered himself to the police.

Branch was returned to Panama City in Florida to face charges for the rape case on January 22, 1993. He was not yet charged for the murder of Morris. Branch pleaded not guilty to the rape charge.

On February 6, 1993, Branch was charged with Morris's rape and murder. Escambia County State Attorney Curtis Golden announced that the prosecution would seek the death penalty against Branch.

On June 12, 1993, Branch pleaded not guilty to the charges of murdering and raping Morris. A trial date of July 19, 1993, was set for Branch.

On July 13, 1993, Branch's trial was delayed to October 11, 1993.

On September 16, 1993, the trial date of October 11, 1993, was delayed until November 8, 1993.

On October 26, 1993, Branch's trial was again rescheduled, this time for January 31, 1994.

On January 25, 1994, the trial was postponed for the fourth time, and the trial date was reset for February 28, 1994.

== Trial ==
Eric Scott Branch

On March 6, 1994, Branch's trial started with jury selection. Jury selection was completed the next day; twelve jurors and four alternate jurors were chosen.

The trial opened on March 9, 1994. During the proceedings, one of the prosecution witnesses, forensic serologist James M. Pollack Jr., testified that the blood found on Branch's sock and boot was matched to the victim's DNA. Melissa Cowden, a student at the university, testified that she saw Branch wearing the same socks and boots when he came to her dormitory room, and while she never noticed any blood on the boots, Cowden said she saw Branch had a cut on one of his right knuckles.

In his defense, Branch denied that he murdered or raped Morris. He stated that Morris was killed by another man named "Eric". According to Branch, Eric agreed to help him steal the car of Morris, and when they encountered the victim approaching her car, Eric hit Morris in the head and when Branch helped Eric to bring the partially unconscious victim to the woods and tried to tie her up, Eric beat Morris again when she moaned.

On March 10, 1994, the jury found Branch guilty of first-degree murder, auto theft and sexual battery.

On March 11, 1994, the jury began to deliberate on whether Branch should receive the death penalty or life imprisonment. The jury heard the testimony from the medical examiner, who testified that there was extreme brutality exhibited by Branch in the course of the crime, because of the extensive injuries suffered by the victim. That same day, the jury sentenced Branch to death based on a majority vote of 10–2.

A hearing was held on April 27, 1994, for the judge to hear further submissions before he formally impose Branch's sentence on May 3, 1994, but Branch expressed during the hearing that he had no intention to seek mercy for himself.

On May 3, 1994, Branch was formally sentenced to death via the electric chair by Circuit Judge Edward Nickinson. Branch was also sentenced to life in prison for the charge of rape, plus five years for auto theft.

After his conviction for Morris's murder, Branch was brought to trial for the Panama City rape case, and he was sentenced to 30 years in prison in November 1994.

== Appeals ==
On November 21, 1996, Branch's direct appeal was dismissed by the Florida Supreme Court.

On August 31, 2006, the Florida Supreme Court turned down Branch's appeal against his death sentence. On April 21, 2011, the 11th Circuit Court of Appeals rejected Branch's appeal against his death sentence.

On June 15, 2017, Branch filed an appeal to the Florida Supreme Court and asked for a resentencing trial since his death sentence was imposed by a non-unanimous vote of 10–2.

On January 22, 2018, the Florida Supreme Court denied Branch's resentencing petition. The court found that Branch was ineligible to be resentenced because his death sentence was finalized in 1997, five years before the 2002 landmark case of Ring v. Arizona.

== Execution ==
On January 19, 2018, Governor Rick Scott signed Branch's death warrant and set an execution date of February 22, 2018. The death warrant was signed three days before the Florida Supreme Court upheld his death sentence and denied his resentencing petition.

On January 31, 2018, Branch filed an appeal to the Escambia County Circuit Court to oppose his execution, stating that it was "cruel and unusual punishment" to detain him on death row for 24 years and execute him, and stating that the execution should not be carried out because he had the mental capacity of a child under 18 at the time of the offense even though he was physically of adult age. On February 1, 2018, Judge Edward Nickinson denied Branch's appeal and rejected those claims.

On February 5, 2018, Branch filed a follow-up appeal against his death sentence and sought a stay of execution, reiterating claims that his brain was not fully developed and his mental capacity was below 18 when he murdered Susan Morris back in 1993. On February 15, 2018, the Florida Supreme Court once again dismissed Branch's appeal, and allowed the scheduled execution to move forward.

On February 21, 2018, the eve of Branch's execution, a final appeal was filed to the U.S. Supreme Court. However, on February 22, 2018, the appeal was denied by the U.S. Supreme Court at 5:30 pm, 30 minutes before the execution was set to begin.

On February 22, 2018, Branch was put to death by lethal injection at the Florida State Prison. Before the start of the execution procedure, Branch reportedly called out to Governor Scott and the state attorney general and proclaimed they should be the ones carrying out the death sentence rather than the correctional officers. Later, when the drugs were administered, Branch had a sudden outburst and shrieked the word "murderers" three times before he was pronounced dead at 7:05 pm. According to a spokesperson, prior to his execution, Branch shared his last meal with his daughter at 10 am when she visited her father at the prison for the final time. Branch declined to consult a spiritual adviser before he was executed.

== Aftermath ==
After the murder of Susan Morris, in 1993, her parents filed a lawsuit against the state of Indiana for erroneously releasing Branch from prison. Similarly, the Panama City rape victim filed a lawsuit against Branch. The lawsuit was settled in 1995 for an undisclosed amount.

The Susan L. Morris Scholarship was established in honor of the victim. In December 1993, Morris's former classmate Arnold Icasiano became the first recipient of the award.

== See also ==
- Capital punishment in Florida
- List of people executed in Florida
- List of people executed in the United States in 2018

Executions carried out in Florida
| Preceded by Patrick Charles Hannon November 8, 2017 | Eric Scott Branch; February 22, 2018 | Succeeded by Jose Antonio Jimenez December 13, 2018 |
Executions carried out in the United States
| Preceded by John David Battaglia Jr. – Texas February 1, 2018 | Eric Scott Branch – Florida; February 22, 2018 | Succeeded by Michael Wayne Eggers – Alabama March 15, 2018 |
