= Wainwright v. Witt =

- Supreme Court of the United States

Argued October 4, 1984 Decided March 5, 1985
- Full case name: Johnny Paul Witt, et al. v. Louie L. Wainwright, Secretary, Florida Department of Corrections et al.
- Citations: 469 U.S. 412 (more) 93 S. Ct. 705; 35 L. Ed. 2d 147

Case history
- Prior: Witherspoon v. Illinois; set for reargument, 391 U.S. 510 (1968)
- Subsequent: Rehearing denied, 470 U.S. 1039 (1985)

Holding
- Juror can be excused from jury due to beliefs on capital punishment during the voir dire.

Court membership
- Chief Justice Warren E. Burger Associate Justices William J. Brennan Jr. · Byron White; Thurgood Marshall · Harry Blackmun; Lewis F. Powell Jr. · William Rehnquist; John P. Stevens · Sandra Day O'Connor

Case opinions
- Majority: Rehnquist, joined by Burger, White, Blackmun, Powell, O'Connor
- Concurrence: Stevens
- Dissent: Brennan, joined by Marshall

Laws applied
- U.S. Const. amends. VI, XIV

Wainwright vs. Witt, 469 U.S. 412 (1985), was a U.S. Supreme Court case concerning a criminal defendant, Johnny Paul Witt, who argued that his Sixth and Fourteenth Amendment rights were violated when he was sentenced to death for first degree murder by the state of Florida. He argued that the trial court had unconstitutionally hand-picked a jury during the voir dire process. This was because certain people were excused from the jury because they admitted pre-trial, that their decision of guilty or not guilty toward capital punishment would be swayed due to personal or religious beliefs.

== Background ==
=== Facts ===
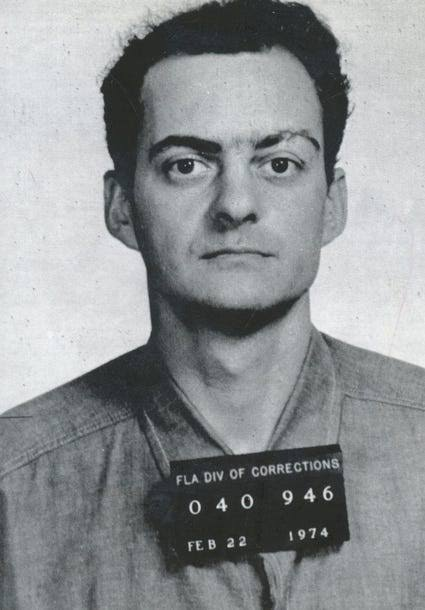
Johnny Paul Witt

In 1974, the defendant, Johnny Paul Witt (January 13, 1943 – March 6, 1985), was tried and convicted of first degree murder in the state of Florida. It was proven that the murder had taken place while the defendant and his accomplice Gary Tillman were bow and arrow hunting in the woods. The two friends admitted to talking about killing people frequently. They even occasionally stalked humans as prey in the woods for fun. While on their bow and arrow hunting trip, the two males eventually ended up stalking an 11-year-old boy named Johnathan Kushner riding his bike down a popular trail in the woods. From there, the accomplice hit the boy with a star bit from a drill stunning the child. Witt and his accomplice gagged the child and threw him in the back of his trunk where the child died from suffocation as a result of the gagging. After driving to a deserted grove, Witt and his accomplice removed the lifeless child in the trunk and slit his stomach to prevent bloating. After, Witt and Tillman performed violent acts on the body, and then buried it in a grave.

=== Procedural history ===
After being convicted of first degree murder on February 21, 1974, Witt was also sentenced to the death penalty. Witt appealed this sentence for five different issues which included the court not allowing evidence to prove insanity, the court's alleged use of non-record material in reviewing his sentence, the state forcing him to admit guilt before he was allowed the right to an attorney, and how the court relied on non-statutory aggravated circumstances however still sentenced him to capital punishment. All four of those mentioned claims were almost immediately thrown out. The only legitimate and significant appeal he made was his belief that the jury had been death qualified because three of the jurors were "improperly excluded for cause because of their opposition to capital punishment."

In a previous U.S. Supreme Court case, Witherspoon vs. Illinois (1968), the Court came to the conclusion that "prospective jurors could not be disqualified from jury service simply because they voiced general objections to the death penalty or expressed conscientious or religious scruples against it. However, a state may exclude those jurors who would automatically vote against the death penalty, or those jurors whose attitudes about the death penalty would affect their decision regarding the defendant's guilt or innocence." Therefore, the state of Florida could, in fact, force a juror to step down if it is unmistakably clear that he or she would automatically vote not guilty or guilty for personal or religious beliefs. Witt's argument was that jurors, who wouldn't automatically vote not guilty on the death penalty, still were forced to step down simply because they didn't like the death penalty and were more likely to vote not guilty. This, he argued, was a violation of his Sixth and Fourteenth Amendment rights.

== Opinion of the Court ==
The Court found that Witt's Sixth and Fourteenth Amendment rights were not violated by the voir dire process that took place before the trial began. They effectively found that the court does have a right to ask a juror to step down pretrial if in fact their beliefs do affect the verdict of the trial in any way. Witt's appeals were dismissed even before a 4th hearing took place. Witt wasn't the first person who took an appeal to Supreme Court because he was sentenced to death by a death qualified jury. For example, Knighton v. Maggio, Witherspoon v. Illinois, and Woodward v. Hutchins were cases in which all the defendants claimed their Sixth and Fourteenth Amendment rights were violated and all of their appeals were denied as well. What made the Witt vs. Wainwright case so significant was that the court did find that the prosecutor, during one of the exchanges over voir dire, did not properly excuse one of the jurors for the "Witherspoon claim." The juror, named Ms.Colby, stated that during the voir dire process, she thought that her judging of innocence or guilt may be affected due to the death penalty. She didn't say, however, that she would automatically vote not guilty.

Mr. Plowman [for the State]: Now, let me ask you a question, ma'am. Do you have any religious beliefs or personal beliefs against the death penalty?

Ms. Colby: I am afraid personally but not—Mr. Plowman: Speak up, please.

Ms. Colby: I am afraid of being a little personal, but definitely not religious.

Mr. Plowman: Now, would that interfere with you sitting as a juror in this case?

Ms. Colby: I am afraid it would.

Mr. Plowman: You are afraid it would?

Ms. Colby: yes, sir.

Mr. Plowman: Would it interfere with judging the guilt or innocence of the defendant in this case?

Ms. Colby: I think so.

Mr. Plowman: You think it would?

Ms. Colby: I think it would.

Mr. Plowman: Your Honor, I would move for cause at this point.

THE COURT: All right. Step down.

She was excused from the jury. The Supreme Court ruled to overlook this as evident by the denial of appeal, almost rewriting the ruling given down by Witherspoon vs. Illinois, ultimately changing how jurors can be excused due to their opinions on the death penalty.

== Historical context ==
The Supreme Court revised the standards set forth in Witherspoon with the standards provided by Wainwright v. Witt in terms of how a jury can become death qualified. "The Witt standard gave more discretion to the judge in death qualification. The judge decides whether the jurors' attitudes toward the death penalty would prevent or substantially impair their ability to decide on sentence fairly." The Witt outcome produced a more death qualified jury. A judge now needs to decide whether a juror's attitude toward the death penalty would alter his decision about guilt or innocence, unlike before, where the juror had to state that he would automatically vote guilty or not guilty due to his beliefs, in order to excuse him from the jury. A more death qualified jury affects many cases involving the death penalty in numerous ways. This is because studies show that African-Americans and other minority groups in the USA tend to be more opposed to the death penalty compared to Caucasians. Females also tend to be more opposed to the death penalty than males. Therefore, juries who are death qualified tend to have more white males than any other racial or ethnic group. A death qualified jury also creates a "conviction prone" jury as well. This is due to the fact that jurors who support the death penalty are generally less sympathetic toward the defendant. Results of numerous studies show that "subjects who had served on the mixed juries were generally more critical of the witnesses, less satisfied with their juries, and better able to remember the evidence than subjects from the death-qualified juries." This is not to mention the voir dire process itself, which asks jurors about their morals and beliefs on the death penalty, which in itself suggests that the case will not only involve capital punishment, but also that the defendant is most likely guilty.

== Conclusion ==
Witt appealed his sentence of capital punishment because he felt a death qualified jury violated his 6th and 14th Amendments, especially with the removal of Ms.Colby from the jury. Unfortunately for him, the standards set by Witherspoon v. Illinois (1968) did not apply to his case. Instead, his case brought new standards that ultimately shaped how a jury can be changed in a trial involving capital punishment. These standards have been researched, criticized, and even brought back to Supreme Court as evident in Lockhart v. McCree (1986) and Uttecht v. Brown (2007). No matter how many appeals get brought to the Supreme Court, they still back the same standards set by Witt over 25 years ago. These standards laid down the foundations and guidelines on how we choose a death qualified jury to this day.

Witt was executed the next day, March 6, 1985.

== See also ==
- Capital punishment in Florida
- Capital punishment in the United States
- List of people executed in Florida
- List of people executed in the United States in 1985
