= John Marek (murderer) =

American murderer (1961–2009)

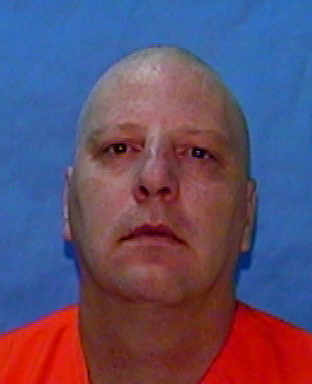
- Born: September 17, 1961; United States
- Died: August 19, 2009 (aged 47); Florida State Prison, Florida, U.S.
- Status: Executed by lethal injection
- Convictions: First degree murder Kidnapping; Attempted burglary
- Penalty: Death

John Richard Marek (September 17, 1961 – August 19, 2009) was an American death row inmate at Florida State Prison for the rape and murder of a woman in 1983. Marek was executed on August 19, 2009.

== Kidnapping and murder ==
On June 16, 1983, Adella Marie Simmons, a 45-year-old mother of two, and her Barry University co-worker Jean Trach were returning home from a holiday trip, when their car broke down on Florida's Turnpike in Broward County. John Marek and his accomplice Raymond Dewayne Wigley stopped and convinced Adella Marie Simmons to ride with them to a service station. They instead took her to a beach about 60 miles away, where she was repeatedly sexually assaulted, and then strangled with a bandana and burned.

Marek's accomplice Raymond Wigley was killed by fellow inmate John Richard Blackwelder while serving life imprisonment in 2000. At trial, Blackwelder said he killed Wigley because he (Blackwelder) wanted to die. He was sentenced to death for killing Wigley and gave up all his appeals. Blackwelder was executed on May 26, 2004.

== Execution ==
Marek was scheduled to be executed by lethal injection on May 13, 2009, inside the Florida State Prison near Starke, Florida, after Governor Charlie Crist signed a death warrant. However, at the last moment the execution did not go through. On July 16, the Florida Supreme Court lifted the stay of execution with Charlie Crist shortly afterwards setting the date of execution to August 19, 2009, at 6 p.m. inside Florida State Prison. Marek's attorney filed a motion claiming there was a new witness attesting that Marek did not kill Simmons. The motion was denied on August 17, 2009, by the judge in the case.

Marek was executed on Wednesday, August 19, 2009, at 6:20 p.m. (Eastern Daylight Time, EDT, -0400 UTC), at Florida State Prison. The method of execution was lethal injection. The execution itself took 13 minutes and Marek was declared dead at 6:33 p.m. Marek had declined sedatives and his final words were "Jesus, remember us sinners", followed by the Lord's Prayer. Marek became the 68th death row inmate to be executed in Florida since the death sentence was reinstated there in 1979.

== See also ==
- Capital punishment in Florida
- Capital punishment in the United States
- List of people executed in Florida
- List of people executed in the United States in 2009

Executions carried out in Florida
Preceded by Wayne Tompkins February 11, 2009	John Marek; August 19, 2009	Succeeded by Martin Grossman February 16, 2010
Executions carried out in the United States
Preceded by Jason Getsy – Ohio August 18, 2009	John Marek – Florida; August 19, 2009	Succeeded by Stephen Lindsey Moody – Texas September 16, 2009
