= List of people executed in Florida =

The following is a list of people executed by the U.S. state of Florida since capital punishment was resumed in the United States in 1976.

The total amounts to 145 people. Of the 145 people executed, 44 have been executed by electrocution and 101 have been executed by lethal injection. Two other people, Buddy Earl Justus and Michael Lee Lockhart, were sentenced to death in Florida, but were executed in Virginia and Texas respectively.

== List of people executed in Florida since 1976 ==
No.	Name	Race	Age	Sex	Date of execution	County	Method	Victim(s)	Governor
1	John Arthur Spenkelink (Note: Spenkelink was the first inmate to be involuntarily executed following Gregg v. Georgia, the 1976 Supreme Court case which reinstated the death penalty after it was invalidated four years prior in Furman v. Georgia.)	White	30	M	May 25, 1979	Leon	Electrocution	Joseph Szymankiewicz	Bob Graham
2	Robert Austin Sullivan	White	36	M	November 30, 1983	Miami-Dade	Electrocution	Donald Schmidt	Bob Graham
3	Anthony Antone	White	66	M	January 26, 1984	Hillsborough	Electrocution	Richard Cloud	Bob Graham
4	Arthur Frederick Goode III	White	30	M	April 5, 1984	Lee	Electrocution	Jason VerDow (Note: Also killed Kenneth Dawson in Virginia, but was executed for killing VerDow.)	Bob Graham
5	James Adams	Black	47	M	May 10, 1984	St. Lucie	Electrocution	Edgar Brown	Bob Graham
6	Carl Elson Shriner	White	30	M	June 20, 1984	Alachua	Electrocution	Judith Ann Carter	Bob Graham
7	David Leroy Washington	Black	34	M	July 13, 1984	Miami-Dade	Electrocution	Daniel Pridgen, Frank Meli, and Katrina Birk	Bob Graham
8	Ernest John Dobbert Jr.	White	46	M	September 7, 1984	Duval	Electrocution	Kelley Dobbert and Ryder Dobbert	Bob Graham
9	James Dupree Henry	Black	34	M	September 20, 1984	Orange	Electrocution	Zellie Riley	Bob Graham
10	Timothy Charles Palmes	White	37	M	November 8, 1984	Duval	Electrocution	James Stone	Bob Graham
11	James David Raulerson	White	33	M	January 30, 1985	Duval	Electrocution	Jacksonville police officer Mike Stewart	Bob Graham
12	Johnny Paul Witt	White	42	M	March 6, 1985	Hillsborough (Note: The crime was committed in Hillsborough County however the trial was held in Volusia County due to a change of venue.)	Electrocution	Jonathan Mark Kushner	Bob Graham
13	Marvin Francois	Black	39	M	May 29, 1985	Miami-Dade	Electrocution	6 murder victims (Note: The 6 victims were: Livingston Stocker, Henry Clayton, Randolph Holmes, Charles Stinson, Gilbert Williams, and Michael Miller.)	Bob Graham
14	Daniel Morris Thomas	Black	37	M	April 15, 1986	Polk	Electrocution	Charles Anderson	Bob Graham
15	David Livingston Funchess	Black	39	M	April 22, 1986	Duval	Electrocution	Anna Waldrop, Clayton Ragan, and Bertha McLeod (Note: The crime occurred in 1974 but only Waldrop and Ragan died on the day it occurred. McLeod died in 1977 due to complications from her injuries.)	Bob Graham
16	Ronald John Michael Straight	White	42	M	May 20, 1986	Duval	Electrocution	James Stone	Bob Graham
17	Beauford James White	Black	41	M	August 28, 1987	Miami-Dade	Electrocution	6 murder victims	Bob Martinez
18	Willie Jasper Darden	Black	54	M	March 15, 1988	Polk (Note: The crime was committed in Polk County however the trial was held in Pinellas County due to a change of venue.)	Electrocution	James Carl Turman	Bob Martinez
19	Jeffrey Joseph Daugherty	White	33	M	November 7, 1988	Volusia	Electrocution	5 murder victims (Note: The 5 victims were: Lavonne Sailer, Betty Campbell, Carmen Abrams, Elizabeth Shanks and George Karns. The first three victims were killed in Florida while the other two were killed in Pennsylvania.)	Bob Martinez
20	Theodore Robert Bundy	White	42	M	January 24, 1989	Columbia (Note: The crime was committed in Columbia County however the trial was held in Orange County due to a change of venue.)	Electrocution	Kimberly Dianne Leach, Lisa Janet Levy, and Margaret Elizabeth Bowman (Note: Bundy was convicted and sentenced to death in Dade County for the murders of Bowman and Levy in Leon County. The execution was carried out specifically for Leach's murder.)	Bob Martinez
21	Aubrey Dennis Adams Jr.	White	31	M	May 4, 1989	Marion	Electrocution	Trisa Gail Thornley	Bob Martinez
22	Jesse Joseph Tafero	White	43	M	May 4, 1990	Broward	Electrocution	FHP Trooper Phillip Black and OPP Constable Donald Irwin	Bob Martinez
23	Anthony Bertolotti	Black	38	M	July 27, 1990	Orange	Electrocution	Carol Ward	Bob Martinez
24	James William Hamblen	White	61	M	September 21, 1990	Duval	Electrocution	Laureen Jean Edwards (Note: Also killed Debbie Abbott in Texas, but was executed for killing Edwards.)	Bob Martinez
25	Raymond Robert Clark	White	49	M	November 19, 1990	Pinellas	Electrocution	David Drake (Note: Also killed Marshall Allen Taylor in California, but was executed for killing Drake.)	Bob Martinez
26	Roy Allen Harich	White	32	M	April 24, 1991	Volusia	Electrocution	Carlene Kelly	Lawton Chiles
27	Bobby Marion Francis	Black	46	M	June 25, 1991	Monroe	Electrocution	Titus Walters	Lawton Chiles
28	Nollie Lee Martin	White	43	M	May 12, 1992	Palm Beach	Electrocution	4 murder victims (Note: The 4 victims were: Patricia Ann Greenfield, Josephine Hogan, Karen Hogan, and Linda Hogan. Martin was executed for killing Greenfield in Florida. The other three victims were killed in North Carolina.)	Lawton Chiles
29	Edward Dean Kennedy	Black	47	M	July 21, 1992	Duval	Electrocution	Floyd Cone Jr. and FHP Trooper Robert McDermon (Note: Also killed Robert Brown, but was executed for killing Cone and McDermon.)	Lawton Chiles
30	Robert Dale Henderson	White	48	M	April 21, 1993	Hernando	Electrocution	5 murder victims (Note: The 5 victims were: Murray Ferderber, Dorothy Wilkerson, Robert Dawson, Frances Dickey and Vernon Odom. He also admitted to 7 more murders in Ohio, South Carolina, Mississippi and Louisiana.)	Lawton Chiles
31	Larry Joe Johnson	White	49	M	May 5, 1993	Madison	Electrocution	James Hadden	Lawton Chiles
32	Michael Alan Durocher	White	33	M	August 25, 1993	Clay	Electrocution	5 murder victims (Note: The 5 victims were: Joshua Durocher, Grace Reed, Candice Reed, Thomas Underwood and Eddie Childers. Durocher was executed for killing Joshua Durocher and the Reed's.)	Lawton Chiles
33	Roy Allen Stewart	White	38	M	April 22, 1994	Miami-Dade	Electrocution	Margaret Haizlip	Lawton Chiles
34	Bernard Bolender	White	42	M	July 18, 1995	Miami-Dade	Electrocution	4 murder victims (Note: The 4 victims were: Rudolfo Ayan Sr., Nico Hernandez, John Merino, and Scott Bennett.)	Lawton Chiles
35	Jerry White	Black	47	M	December 4, 1995	Orange	Electrocution	James Melson	Lawton Chiles
36	Phillip Alexander Atkins	White	40	M	December 5, 1995	Polk	Electrocution	Antonio Castillo	Lawton Chiles
37	John Earl Bush	Black	38	M	October 21, 1996	Martin (Note: The crime was committed in Martin County however the trial was held in Lee County due to a change of venue.)	Electrocution	Frances Julia Slater	Lawton Chiles
38	John Mills Jr.	Black	41	M	December 6, 1996	Wakulla	Electrocution	Les Lawhon	Lawton Chiles
39	Pedro Luis Medina	Hispanic	39	M	March 25, 1997	Orange	Electrocution	Dorothy James	Lawton Chiles
40	Gerald Eugene Stano	White	46	M	March 23, 1998	Volusia	Electrocution	Cathy Lee Scharf (Note: Stano was also convicted of 8 other murders.)	Lawton Chiles
41	Leo Alexander Jones	Black	47	M	March 24, 1998	Duval	Electrocution	Jacksonville Sheriff's Officer Thomas Szafranski	Lawton Chiles
42	Judias Anna Lou Buenoano	White	54	F	March 30, 1998	Orange	Electrocution	James Goodyear (Note: Also killed Michael Buenoano and Bobby Joe Morris, but was executed for killing Goodyear.)	Lawton Chiles
43	Daniel Eugene Remeta	Native American	40	M	March 31, 1998	Marion	Electrocution	5 murder victims (Note: The 5 victims were: Mehrle Reeder, Linda Marvin, Larry McFarland, Glenn Moore, and John Schroeder. Remeta was executed for Reeder's murder in Florida, Marvin was killed in Arkansas and the other 3 victims were killed in Kansas.)	Lawton Chiles
44	Allen Lee Davis	White	54	M	July 8, 1999	Duval	Electrocution	Nancy Weiler, Kristina Weiler, and Katherine Weiler	Jeb Bush
45	Terry Melvin Sims	White	58	M	February 23, 2000	Seminole	Lethal injection	Seminole County Sheriff's Office deputy George Pfeil	Jeb Bush
46	Anthony Braden Bryan	White	40	M	February 24, 2000	Santa Rosa	Lethal injection	George Wilson	Jeb Bush
47	Bennie Eddie Demps	Black	49	M	June 7, 2000	Bradford	Lethal injection	Alfred Sturgis (Note: Demps was previously sentenced to death in 1971 for the murders of Celia Puhlick and Robert Brinkworth, but his death sentences were commuted to life after the 1972 suspension of capital punishment by Furman v. Georgia. Demps was sentenced to death a second time in 1978 after killing Sturgis, also a convicted murderer, in prison in 1976.)	Jeb Bush
48	Thomas Harrison Provenzano	White	51	M	June 21, 2000	Orange	Lethal injection	William Wilkerson, Harry Dalton, and Mark Parker (Note: The crime occurred in 1984 but only Wilkerson died on the day it occurred. Dalton died in 1991 and Parker died in 2009; both of complications from their injuries. Wilkerson and Dalton were both Deputy Sheriff's and Parker was a corrections officer.)	Jeb Bush
49	Dan Patrick Hauser	White	30	M	August 25, 2000	Okaloosa	Lethal injection	Melanie Rodrigues	Jeb Bush
50	Edward Castro	Hispanic	50	M	December 7, 2000	Marion	Lethal injection	Austin Carter Scott (Note: Also killed Claude Henderson and George Hill, but was executed for killing Scott.)	Jeb Bush
51	Robert Dewey Glock II	White	39	M	January 11, 2001	Pasco	Lethal injection	Sharilyn Ritchie	Jeb Bush
52	Rigoberto Sanchez-Velasco	Hispanic	43	M	October 2, 2002	Miami-Dade	Lethal injection	Katixa Ecenarro (Note: Also killed fellow death row inmates Edwin Kaprat and Charles Street, but was executed for killing Ecenarro.)	Jeb Bush
53	Aileen Carol Wuornos	White	46	F	October 9, 2002	Dixie	Lethal injection	7 murder victims (Note: The 7 victims were: Richard Mallory, Dick Humphreys, Charles Carskaddon, Troy Burress, Peter Siems, Walter Jeno Antonio, and David Spears.)	Jeb Bush
54	Linroy Bottoson	Black	63	M	December 9, 2002	Orange	Lethal injection	Catherine Alexander	Jeb Bush
55	Amos Lee King Jr.	Black	48	M	February 26, 2003	Pinellas	Lethal injection	Natalie Brady	Jeb Bush
56	Newton Carlton Slawson	White	48	M	May 16, 2003	Hillsborough	Lethal injection	4 murder victims (Note: The 4 victims were: Gerald Wood, Peggy Wood, Jennifer Wood, and Glendon Wood.)	Jeb Bush
57	Paul Jennings Hill	White	49	M	September 3, 2003	Escambia	Lethal injection	John Bayard Britton and James Herman Barrett	Jeb Bush
58	Johnny Leartice Robinson	Black	51	M	February 4, 2004	St. Johns	Lethal injection	Beverly St. George	Jeb Bush
59	John Richard Blackwelder	White	49	M	May 26, 2004	Columbia	Lethal injection	Raymond Dewayne Wigley	Jeb Bush
60	Glen James Ocha	White	47	M	April 5, 2005	Osceola	Lethal injection	Carol Skjerva	Jeb Bush
61	Clarence Edward Hill	Black	48	M	September 20, 2006	Escambia	Lethal injection	Pensacola police officer Stephen Taylor	Jeb Bush
62	Arthur Dennis Rutherford	White	57	M	October 18, 2006	Santa Rosa	Lethal injection	Stella Salamon	Jeb Bush
63	Danny Harold Rolling	White	52	M	October 25, 2006	Alachua	Lethal injection	5 murder victims (Note: The 5 victims were: Sonja Larson, Christina Powell, Christa Hoyt, Manuel R. Taboada, and Tracy Inez Paules.)	Jeb Bush
64	Ángel Nieves Díaz	Hispanic	55	M	December 13, 2006	Miami-Dade	Lethal injection	Joseph Nagy	Jeb Bush
65	Mark Dean Schwab	White	39	M	July 1, 2008	Brevard	Lethal injection	Junny Rios-Martinez Jr.	Charlie Crist
66	Richard Henyard	Black	34	M	September 23, 2008	Lake	Lethal injection	Jamilya Lewis and Jasmine Lewis	Charlie Crist
67	Wayne Tompkins	White	51	M	February 11, 2009	Hillsborough	Lethal injection	Lisa DeCarr	Charlie Crist
68	John Richard Marek	White	47	M	August 19, 2009	Broward	Lethal injection	Adella Marie Simmons	Charlie Crist
69	Martin Edward Grossman	White	45	M	February 16, 2010	Pinellas	Lethal injection	Wildlife Officer Margaret Park	Charlie Crist
70	Manuel Adriano Valle	Hispanic	61	M	September 28, 2011	Miami-Dade	Lethal injection	Coral Gables police officer Louis Pena	Rick Scott
71	Oba Chandler Jr.	White	65	M	November 15, 2011	Pinellas	Lethal injection	4 murder victims (Note: The 4 victims were: Joan Rogers, Michelle Rogers, Christe Rogers, and Ivelisse Berrios-Beguerisse. Chandler was executed for killing the Rogers.)	Rick Scott
72	Robert Brian Waterhouse	White	65	M	February 15, 2012	Pinellas	Lethal injection	Deborah Kammerer (Note: Also killed Ella Carter in New York, but was executed for killing Kammerer.)	Rick Scott
73	David Alan Gore	White	58	M	April 12, 2012	Indian River (Note: The crime was committed in Indian River County however the trial was held in Pinellas County due to a change of venue.)	Lethal injection	6 murder victims (Note: The 6 victims were: Lynn Elliot, Hsiang Huang Ling, Ying Hua Ling, Judy Kay Daley, Angelica LaVellee, and Barbara Ann Byer.)	Rick Scott
74	Manuel Pardo Jr.	Hispanic	56	M	December 11, 2012	Miami-Dade	Lethal injection	9 murder victims (Note: The 9 victims were: Mario Amador, Roberto Alfonso, Luis Robledo, Ulpiano Ledo, Michael Millot, Fara Quintero, Sara Musa, Ramon Alvero Cruz, and Daisy Ricard.)	Rick Scott
75	Larry Eugene Mann	White	59	M	April 10, 2013	Pinellas	Lethal injection	Elisa Vera Nelson	Rick Scott
76	Elmer Leon Carroll	White	56	M	May 29, 2013	Orange	Lethal injection	Christine McGowan	Rick Scott
77	William Edward Van Poyck	White	58	M	June 12, 2013	Palm Beach	Lethal injection	Florida Department of Corrections officer Fred Griffis	Rick Scott
78	John Errol Ferguson	Black	65	M	August 5, 2013	Miami-Dade	Lethal injection	8 murder victims (Note: The 8 victims were: Brian Glenfeldt, Belinda Worley, Livingston Stocker, Michael Miller, Henry Clayton, John Holmes, Gilbert Williams, and Charles Cesar Stinson.)	Rick Scott
79	Marshall Lee Gore	White	50	M	October 1, 2013	Columbia	Lethal injection	Robyn Novick (Note: Also killed Susan Roark, but was executed for killing Novick.)	Rick Scott
80	William Frederick Happ	White	51	M	October 15, 2013	Citrus (Note: The crime was committed in Citrus County however the trial was held in Lake County due to a change of venue.)	Lethal injection	Angela Crowley	Rick Scott
81	Darius Mark Kimbrough	Black	40	M	November 12, 2013	Orange	Lethal injection	Denise Collins	Rick Scott
82	Thomas Otis Knight (Note: Also known as Askari Abdullah Muhammad.)	Black	62	M	January 7, 2014	Miami-Dade and Bradford	Lethal injection	4 murder victims (Note: The 4 victims were: Sydney Gans, Lillian Gans, William Culpepper, and Richard Burke. Burke was a Florida Department of Corrections officer. Culpepper was killed in Georgia, while the other victims were killed in Florida.)	Rick Scott
83	Juan Carlos Chavez	Hispanic	46	M	February 12, 2014	Miami-Dade (Note: The crime was committed in Miami-Dade County however the trial was held in Orange County due to a change of venue.)	Lethal injection	Samuel James Ryce	Rick Scott
84	Paul Augustus Howell	Black	48	M	February 26, 2014	Jefferson	Lethal injection	Florida Highway Patrol Trooper Jimmy Fulford	Rick Scott
85	Robert Lavern Henry	Black	55	M	March 20, 2014	Broward	Lethal injection	Phyllis Harris and Janet Cox Thermidor	Rick Scott
86	Robert Eugene Hendrix	White	47	M	April 23, 2014	Lake	Lethal injection	Elmer Bryant Scott Jr. and Michelle Scott	Rick Scott
87	John Ruthell Henry	Black	63	M	June 18, 2014	Pasco	Lethal injection	Suzanne Henry and Eugene Christian (Note: Also killed Patricia Roddy, but was executed for killing Henry and Christian.)	Rick Scott
88	Eddie Wayne Davis	White	45	M	July 10, 2014	Polk	Lethal injection	Kimberly Ann Waters	Rick Scott
89	Chadwick Dewellyn Banks	Black	43	M	November 13, 2014	Gadsden	Lethal injection	Cassandra Banks and Melody Cooper	Rick Scott
90	Johnny Shane Kormondy	White	42	M	January 15, 2015	Escambia	Lethal injection	Gary McAdams	Rick Scott
91	Jerry William Correll	White	59	M	October 29, 2015	Orange (Note: The crime was committed in Orange County however the trial was held in Sarasota County due to a change of venue.)	Lethal injection	4 murder victims (Note: The 4 victims were: Susan Correll, Tuesday Correll, Mary Lou Hines, and Marybeth Jones.)	Rick Scott
92	Oscar Ray Bolin Jr.	White	53	M	January 7, 2016	Pasco and Hillsborough	Lethal injection	Teri Lynn Matthews, Natalie Blanche Holley, and Stephanie Collins	Rick Scott
93	Mark James Asay	White	53	M	August 24, 2017	Duval	Lethal injection	Robert Lee Booker and Robert McDowell	Rick Scott
94	Michael Ray Lambrix	White	57	M	October 5, 2017	Glades	Lethal injection	Aleisha Bryant and Clarence Moore	Rick Scott
95	Patrick Charles Hannon	White	53	M	November 8, 2017	Hillsborough	Lethal injection	Brandon Snider and Robert Carter	Rick Scott
96	Eric Scott Branch	White	47	M	February 22, 2018	Escambia	Lethal injection	Susan Morris	Rick Scott
97	José Antonio Jiménez	Hispanic	55	M	December 13, 2018	Miami-Dade	Lethal injection	Phyllis Minas (Note: Also killed Marie Debas, but was executed for killing Minas.)	Rick Scott
98	Bobby Joe Long	White	65	M	May 23, 2019	Hillsborough	Lethal injection	10 murder victims (Note: The 10 victims were: Artiss Ann Wick, Ngeun Thi Long, Michelle Denise Simms, Elizabeth Loudenback, Victoria Marie Elliott, Chanel Devoun Williams, Karen Beth Dinsfriend, Kimberly Kyle Hopps, Virginia Lee Johnson, and Kimberly Marie Swann. Long wasn't convicted of murdering Johnson, and Wick. Of the 8 murders he was convicted of he was only sentenced to death and executed for the murder of Michelle Simms.)	Ron DeSantis
99	Gary Ray Bowles	White	57	M	August 22, 2019	Duval	Lethal injection	6 murder victims (Note: The 6 victims were: John Hardy Roberts, David Alan Jarman, Milton Joseph Bradley, Alverson Carter Jr., Albert Morris, and Walter Jamelle Hinton. Bowles was executed for the murders of Roberts, Morris and Hinton, all of whom were killed in Florida. Jarman was killed in Maryland while Bradley and Carter were killed in Georgia.)	Ron DeSantis
100	Donald David Dillbeck	White	59	M	February 23, 2023	Leon	Lethal injection	Faye Lamb Vann (Note: Also killed Lee County sheriff's deputy Dwight Lynn Hall, but was executed for killing Vann.)	Ron DeSantis
101	Louis Bernard Gaskin	Black	56	M	April 12, 2023	Flagler	Lethal injection	Robert Sturmfels and Georgette Sturmfels (Note: Also killed Charles Miller, but was executed for killing the Sturmfels.)	Ron DeSantis
102	Darryl Brian Barwick	White	56	M	May 3, 2023	Bay	Lethal injection	Rebecca Wendt	Ron DeSantis
103	Duane Eugene Owen	White	62	M	June 15, 2023	Palm Beach	Lethal injection	Karen Slattery and Georgianna Worden	Ron DeSantis
104	James Phillip Barnes	White	61	M	August 3, 2023	Brevard	Lethal injection	Patricia Miller (Note: Also killed his wife, Linda Barnes, but was executed for killing Miller. He confessed to two other murders but was never charged with either.)	Ron DeSantis
105	Michael Duane Zack III	White	54	M	October 3, 2023	Escambia	Lethal injection	Ravonne Kennedy Smith (Note: Also killed Laura Barbara Russillo, but was executed for killing Smith.)	Ron DeSantis
106	Loran Kenstley Cole	White	57	M	August 29, 2024	Marion	Lethal injection	John Timothy Edwards	Ron DeSantis
107	James Dennis Ford	White	64	M	February 13, 2025	Charlotte	Lethal injection	Gregory Philip Malnory and Kimberly Ann Malnory	Ron DeSantis
108	Edward Thomas James	White	63	M	March 20, 2025	Seminole	Lethal injection	Toni Marie Neuner and Elizabeth Ann Dick	Ron DeSantis
109	Michael Anthony Tanzi	White	48	M	April 8, 2025	Monroe	Lethal injection	Janet Acosta	Ron DeSantis
110	Jeffrey Glenn Hutchinson	White	62	M	May 1, 2025	Okaloosa	Lethal injection	4 murder victims (Note: The 4 victims were: Renee Nadean Flaherty, Geoffrey Dean Flaherty, Amanda Marie Flaherty, and Logan Kyle Flaherty.)	Ron DeSantis
111	Glen Edward Rogers	White	62	M	May 15, 2025	Hillsborough	Lethal injection	Tina Marie Cribbs (Note: Was also sentenced to death in California for the murder of Sandra Gallagher. Further conclusively linked to at least three other murders.)	Ron DeSantis
112	Anthony Floyd Wainwright	White	54	M	June 10, 2025	Hamilton	Lethal injection	Carmen Gabriella Gayheart	Ron DeSantis
113	Thomas Lee Gudinas	White	51	M	June 24, 2025	Orange (Note: The crime was committed in Orange County however the trial was held in Collier County due to a change of venue.)	Lethal injection	Michelle Anne McGrath	Ron DeSantis
114	Michael Bernard Bell	Black	54	M	July 15, 2025	Duval	Lethal injection	5 murder victims (Note: The 5 victims were: Jimmy West, Tamecka Smith, LaShawn Cowart, Travis Cowart, and Michael Johnson. Bell was executed for killing West and Smith.)	Ron DeSantis
115	Edward James Zakrzewski II	White	60	M	July 31, 2025	Okaloosa	Lethal injection	Sylvia Zakrzewski, Anna Zakrzewski, and Edward Jon Zakrzewski III	Ron DeSantis
116	Kayle Barrington Bates	Black	67	M	August 19, 2025	Bay	Lethal injection	Janet Renee White	Ron DeSantis
117	Curtis Lee Windom	Black	59	M	August 28, 2025	Orange	Lethal injection	Johnnie Lee, Valerie Davis, and Mary Lubin	Ron DeSantis
118	David Joseph Pittman	White	63	M	September 17, 2025	Polk	Lethal injection	Clarence Knowles, Barbara Knowles, and Bonnie Knowles	Ron DeSantis
119	Victor Tony Jones	Black	64	M	September 30, 2025	Miami-Dade	Lethal injection	Jacob Nestor and Matilda Nestor	Ron DeSantis
120	Samuel Lee Smithers	White	72	M	October 14, 2025	Hillsborough	Lethal injection	Denise Elaine Roach and Christy Elizabeth Cowan	Ron DeSantis
121	Norman Mearle Grim Jr.	White	65	M	October 28, 2025	Santa Rosa	Lethal injection	Cynthia Campbell	Ron DeSantis
122	Bryan Frederick Jennings	White	66	M	November 13, 2025	Brevard	Lethal injection	Rebecca Kunash	Ron DeSantis
123	Richard Barry Randolph	Black	63	M	November 20, 2025	Putnam	Lethal injection	Minnie Ruth McCollum	Ron DeSantis
124	Mark Allen Geralds	White	58	M	December 9, 2025	Bay	Lethal injection	Tressa Lynn Pettibone	Ron DeSantis
125	Frank Athen Walls	White	58	M	December 18, 2025	Okaloosa	Lethal injection	5 murder victims (Note: The 5 victims were: Edward Alger, Ann Louise Peterson, Tommie Lou Whiddon, Cynthia Sue Condra, and Audrey Gygi. Walls was executed for killing Peterson.)	Ron DeSantis
126	Ronald Palmer Heath	White	64	M	February 10, 2026	Alachua	Lethal injection	Michael Sheridan (Note: Also killed Michael Lee Green and Anthony Hammett, but was executed for killing Sheridan.)	Ron DeSantis
127	Melvin Lee Trotter	Black	65	M	February 24, 2026	Manatee	Lethal injection	Virgie Eletha Langford	Ron DeSantis
128	Billy Leon Kearse	Black	53	M	March 3, 2026	St. Lucie	Lethal injection	Fort Pierce police officer Sgt. Danny Thomas Parrish	Ron DeSantis
129	Michael Lee King	White	54	M	March 17, 2026	Sarasota	Lethal injection	Denise Amber Lee	Ron DeSantis
130	Chadwick Scott Willacy	Black	58	M	April 21, 2026	Brevard	Lethal injection	Marlys Mae Sather	Ron DeSantis
131	James Ernest Hitchcock	White	70	M	April 30, 2026	Orange	Lethal injection	Cynthia Ann Driggers	Ron DeSantis
132	Richard Andrew Knight Jr.	Black	47	M	May 21, 2026	Broward	Lethal injection	Odessia Stephens and Hanessia Mullings	Ron DeSantis
133	Andrew Richard Lukehart	White	53	M	June 2, 2026	Duval	Lethal injection	Gabrielle Hanshaw	Ron DeSantis
134	Dusty Ray Spencer	White	74	M	June 25, 2026	Orange	Lethal injection	Karen Spencer	Ron DeSantis
135	Dennis Michael Sochor	White	74	M	July 14, 2026	Broward	Lethal injection	Patricia Marie Gifford	Ron DeSantis
136	James Aren Duckett	White	68	M	July 28, 2026	Lake	Lethal injection	Teresa Mae McAbee (Note: Suspected of killing two more females: 22-year-old Ronette Lynn Peterson and 14-year-old Jeanifer Shyan Weldon in 1986 and 1987 respectively.)	Ron DeSantis
137	Dominick Anthony Occhicone Jr.	White	80	M	July 28, 2026	Pasco	Lethal injection	Raymond Artzner and Martha Artzner (Note: Occhicone was executed only for murdering Martha Artzner, because he was given life imprisonment for the murder of Raymond Artzner.)	Ron DeSantis
138	William Frances Silvia Jr.	White	61	M	August 18, 2026	Seminole	Lethal injection	Patricia Ann Silvia	Ron DeSantis
139	Harold Gene Lucas	White	74	M	September 1, 2026	Lee	Lethal injection	Anthia Jill Piper	Ron DeSantis
140	Daniel Owen Conahan Jr.	White	72	M	September 10, 2026	Charlotte	Lethal injection	Richard Allen Montgomery	Ron DeSantis
141	Curtis Wilkie Beasley Sr.	White	77	M	September 29, 2026	Polk	Lethal injection	Carolyn Monfort	Ron DeSantis
142	James Robertson	White	63	M	October 13, 2026	Charlotte	Lethal injection	Frank Richard Hart	Ron DeSantis
143	William Reaves Jr.	Black	77	M	October 20, 2026	Indian River	Lethal injection	Indian River County Sheriff's Office Cpl. Richard Raczkoski	Ron DeSantis
144	Jesse Guardado	White	64	M	November 5, 2026	Walton	Lethal injection	Jackie Malone	Ron DeSantis
145	Thomas Mitchell Overton	White	71	M	November 19, 2026	Monroe	Lethal injection	Michael MacIvor and Susan MacIvor	Ron DeSantis

== Demographics ==
Race
White	97	67%
Black	39	27%
Hispanic	8	6%
Native American	1	1%
Age
30–39	23	16%
40–49	42	29%
50–59	41	28%
60–69	29	20%
70–79	9	6%
80–89	1	1%
Sex
Male	143	99%
Female	2	1%
Date of execution
1976–1979	1	1%
1980–1989	20	14%
1990–1999	23	16%
2000–2009	24	17%
2010–2019	31	21%
2020–2029	46	32%
Method
Lethal injection	101	70%
Electrocution	44	30%
Governor (Party)
Reubin Askew (D)	0	0%
Bob Graham (D)	16	11%
Bob Martinez (R)	9	6%
Lawton Chiles (D)	18	12%
Buddy MacKay (D)	0	0%
Jeb Bush (R)	21	14%
Charlie Crist (R)	5	3%
Rick Scott (R)	28	19%
Ron DeSantis (R)	48	33%
Total	145	100%

== See also ==
- Capital punishment in Florida
- Capital punishment in the United States
- List of people executed in Florida (pre-1972) – executions in Florida before Furman
