= Last meal =

Meal preceding one's execution

In criminal justice systems, a condemned prisoner's last meal is a customary ritual preceding execution. In many countries, the prisoner may, within reason, select what the last meal will be.

== Contemporary restrictions in the United States ==
Contrary to the common belief that all last meal requests, regardless of their complexity, must be fulfilled, various restrictions are in place over what can be requested.

In the United States, most states give the meal a day or two before the actual execution and use the euphemism "special meal". Alcohol and tobacco are usually, but not always, denied. Unorthodox or unavailable requests can be replaced with similar substitutes. Some states place tight restrictions. Sometimes, a prisoner asks to share the last meal with another inmate (as Francis Crowley did with John Resko in 1932) or has the meal distributed among other inmates (as requested by Raymond Fernandez in 1951).

In Florida, the food for the last meal must be purchased locally and the cost was limited to $40 as of 2007. In Oklahoma, the cost is limited to $25. In Louisiana, the Angola prison warden traditionally joins the condemned prisoner for the last meal. On one occasion, the warden paid for an inmate's lobster dinner.

In September 2011, Texas abolished its long-standing tradition of customized last meals after Lawrence Brewer requested a large, expensive meal and refused to eat any of it. Consequently, condemned prisoners in Texas are restricted to the standard meal provided in the Huntsville Unit cafeteria on the day of their execution.

== Restrictions internationally ==
For last meals outside of the United States, there are very different circumstances. Most countries in Europe have abolished the death penalty, meaning that last meals are not granted at all.

=== China ===
For last meals in China, it is typical to provide the prisoner with the standard meal that all other inmates get.

== See also ==
- Capital punishment
- Death row
- Final statement
- Last Supper
- Religion and capital punishment
