= Murder of Liam Ashley =

2006 murder in Auckland

- Date: 24 August 2006; 20 years ago
- Time: 17:50 – 18:05 (UTC)
- Location: Mount Eden, Auckland, New Zealand
- Type: Strangulation, child murder
- Perpetrator: George Charlie Baker
- Convictions: Murder
- Sentence: Life in prison with minimum non-parole period of 18 years

On 24 August 2006, 17-year-old Liam Ashley was murdered by 25-year-old George Charlie Baker in Mount Eden, Auckland, New Zealand. The crime occurred inside a prison van bound for Auckland Central Remand Prison in Mount Eden. The government and judicial authorities faced criticism for the case, particularly regarding the methods of transporting prisoners in New Zealand, as Ashley had committed minor non-violent offenses while Baker had a history of recidivism and violent crime.

== Background ==
Liam John Ashley was born on 17 May 1989 to Ian and Lorraine Ashley as the youngest of four children, and lived in North Shore City, Auckland with his parents. At age three, Ashley was diagnosed with attention deficit hyperactivity disorder, for which he was prescribed Ritalin beginning when he was five years old. He changed schools a minimum of three times due to behavioral and learning difficulties before attending Waimokoia Special School in Half Moon Bay, a last-stop primary school for the country's most difficult children. Following this, Ashley attended Halswell Residential College in Christchurch, a school for students with complex behavioural problems, learning disabilities, and neurodevelopmental disorders such as ADHD. He left Halswell Residential College to attend regular schooling in Auckland at the request of his father in early May 2004. After leaving school, Ashley worked for his father's business cleaning and detailing cars.

Nicknamed "Crazy Liam" by his friends, Ashley had experienced "minor trouble" with police related to public drinking and disorderly conduct, but was not noted in the youth justice court before the summer of 2006. One of Ashley's friends claimed that they had previously taken the car of Ashley's father for a joyride and dumped the vehicle in the sea after breaking its windows, though this went unreported by Ashley's parents, as they were unaware of their son's involvement.

== Arrest and custody ==
On 30 June 2006, Ashley was arrested and charged in the North Shore District Court the next day with trespass, burglary, and possession of a knife in a public place. He was bailed on 3 July and reappeared in court on 26 July with additional charges of unlawful presence in enclosed yard or area, failure to comply with driving prohibition without a licence, failure to answer police bail and a second charge of trespass. Ashley was again bailed the same day. On 18 August, three more charges were added, including unlawful operation of a motor vehicle, possession of a pipe (for marijuana consumption) and a second charge of burglary. The motor theft charge was a result of Liam taking his mother's car without permission.

Ashley was held on pre-trial remand in the youth wing of Auckland Central Remand Prison until his court appearance on 24 August. Despite Department of Corrections regulations designed to keep prisoners under the age of 18 separate from older prisoners "where practicable", he was not separated from adult offenders on three different occasions, once on 21 August and twice on 24 August. Later investigations concluded this was due to a series of errors in inputting and communicating information and from established procedures that "placed insufficient emphasis on the separation of youth and adult prisoners".

On 20 August, Ashley was assessed through the Prison Youth Vulnerability Scale (PYVS) as a "high" vulnerability risk of 25, having scored 17 out of 24 points in "vulnerability to victimisation".

=== Court appearance and bail decision ===
Ashley appeared before Judge Barbara Morris in the North Shore District Court on 24 August 2006 where he pleaded guilty to most of the charges he was facing. It was revealed during the hearing that Ashley's parents had expressed to the Court that they did not wish Liam to return home as much of the offending had targeted his parents' property and they feared his offending against them would "escalate". This meant that their address could not be used for Ashley to be remanded on bail. They also hoped that being remanded to prison would correct the boy's behaviour by giving him "a shock", and hopefully "stop him getting into more serious trouble". At the time his parents believed that the prison system would be the safest place for him and viewed prison as a "last resort".

During the hearing, Judge Morris noted that Ashley had previously breached his bail conditions on the 6th of July, 21st of July, 26th of July, and 27th of July, and Ashley's counsel indicated he did not have a suitable address to be bailed to. When considering whether or not to grant bail, Judge Morris discussed Ashley's age asking "They're kept separate, aren't they, 17 year olds?" and was reassured by the Probation Officer present that Ashley "would almost certainly" be held in a youth wing for offenders under the age of 20 and kept away from adult prisoners.

Judge Morris denied bail and Ashley was to be remanded in custody until his sentencing. In order to minimise the time Ashley would be held on remand in prison before his sentencing, Judge Morris set a sentencing date of 8 September. This was the earliest a pre-sentence report could be prepared meaning Ashley would spend as little time as possible in prison.

Following Ashley's murder, on 8 September (the day that would have been Ashley's sentencing on the earlier charges) Judge Morris reassured his parents that her decision not to grant bail would have been made regardless of their intention to not allow him to be bailed to their address, saying "Do not think things would have been different if you had come here and offered a place of residence ... he would have been remanded in custody anyway".

== Murder ==
Early on the morning of 24 August, Ashley was held in the same cell as George Charlie Baker of Whakatāne. Baker, a concrete fabricator by trade, had 79 previous convictions mostly for violent assaults and had been released in March 2006 following a seven-year imprisonment following his conviction for the assault of an elderly woman during a home invasion. During this imprisonment Baker had received periodic psychiatric care and had been assessed as being likely to "resort to extreme violence in order to obtain fame." Baker was being held on remand after pleading guilty for aggravated robbery and wounding with intent in connection with the stabbing of a teenager during an attempted mugging at a wharf in Beach Haven, North Shore City in April 2006. Baker was classified as a dangerous criminal and variously claimed affiliation with or membership in the Black Power and King Cobras gangs. Ashley and Baker were handcuffed together for several hours. Baker stated in court that he talked to Ashley during the stay and learnt that Ashley lived not far from where the stabbing occurred, concluding that Ashley could possibly be a witness that would testify against him in court. Baker had previously made explicit death threats via mail against the victim in the robbery and his family.

At 16:48 (UTC+12:00), prison authorities placed Ashley in one of four compartments of a prison van operated by Chubb Security, a company operating under contract to transport prisoners on behalf of the Department of Corrections. The van was scheduled to transport the prisoners from North Shore District Court to Auckland Central Remand Prison in Mount Eden. Ashley shared the compartment with two other men, including George Baker. The van made a 30 minute stop at Henderson Police Station at 17:15.

The third prisoner in the van compartment who was initially only identified as "Prisoner E" and later identified as David Olds, stated that Ashley and Baker had spent some time discussing an escape attempt before spending 15 minutes lying on their backs trying to kick open a hatch in the van roof. When that failed, Baker suggested to Ashley that he fake a seizure to get the guards to open the van door so they could escape. When Ashley refused, Baker told him he would put him in a "sleeper hold" instead. In a 2009 interview, Olds said "Liam was like, 'Yeah, OK'. He was sitting there for ages in the sleeper hold and Baker was talking away to him, going 'Is that all right?' Liam's going, 'Nah, nah, it's not working. I can still breathe. You've got to go a bit tighter.' The last word I remember him saying was 'tighter'. He was totally trusting".

At approximately 17:50, Baker tightened his grip on Ashley's throat when he realised that their arrival at Auckland Central Remand Prison in Mount Eden was imminent. According to Olds, Baker suddenly "just snapped" and said to Ashley "You’re that fucking nark, you're the reason I'm in this shit hole" and began violently assaulting Ashley, first by trying to break his neck by jerking it from side to side, and then by strangling Ashley, banging his head against a steel seat, and finally by kicking and stomping on Ashley's head. The attack lasted for between 10 and 15 minutes during which time Baker claimed that he was "hired to kill Liam because he was a nark" and told Olds "don’t worry, I'm hired to do this." Baker also shouted "Fucking die, fucking die" and "this guy is taking ages to die, he's breathing".

The attack was only noticed at 18:05, when the vehicle arrived at its destination and officers opened the prisoner compartment. Baker told officers "Get that fella out, I killed him" and "Uso [Samoan slang word for "brother"], you better pull that guy out I just killed him. He isn't breathing". Officers and staff performed continuous CPR on Ashley until an ambulance arrived 25 minutes later.

Ashley had sustained severe brain injuries and was brought to Auckland Public Hospital. The following day, 25 August, at 10:30, his family chose to remove Ashley from life support; Liam Ashley died at 10:45.

== Aftermath ==
=== Criticism of Failures by the Department of Corrections and Chubb ===
New Zealand Prime Minister Helen Clark described Ashley's death as "an extremely shocking event" and said it was "totally unacceptable for someone to be killed in the back of a security van".

Damien O'Connor, the Minister of Corrections, described the murder of Ashley as "senseless" and "preventable." Errors had been made in Baker's documentation that would have otherwise required him to be separated from prisoners classed "at risk" such as Ashley.

Chubb, the security company that operated the van, faced criticism in the aftermath of the attack. In June 2007, the company announced that it no longer wished to transport prisoners on behalf of the Department of Corrections, a contract they had held since 1998 and sold that part of their business to a subsidiary of Danish company ISS Global A/S, in 2009.

=== Inquiry and Investigations into the Incident ===
As a result of Ashley's death, several investigations and inquiries were launched.

In 2007, John Belgrave, New Zealand Chief Ombudsman, and Mel Smith, the ombudsman of the Department of Corrections, conducted an inquiry into the department's policy for transporting prisoners. Belgrave described Corrections' prisoner transport policies as "inhumane", and ordered a review of the system. After the publication of the report, Simon Power, an Opposition Justice & Corrections spokesman, asked O'Connor to resign due to the shortcomings in his department. However, he stopped short of saying that O'Connor was directly responsible for Ashley's death. Power criticized the system for failing to keep Ashley, a first-time offender, and Baker, a high-risk prisoner, separated.

In response to Ashley's death, New Zealand authorities began testing waist restraints for prisoners.

=== Compensation ===
After official investigations found shortcomings in the way the Department of Correction dealt with the transportation of inmates, the Ashley family talked about seeking compensation from the department in the hope it would "avert further tragedies".

In January 2009 it was reported that the Ashley family had received an undisclosed sum from the Department of Corrections over the death of their son. At the time, the Ashleys' lawyer said the matter had been "resolved between the parties".

== George Charlie Baker ==
=== Criminal background ===
At the time of the 2006 murder of Liam Ashley, George Charlie Baker had an already extensive criminal history and had accumulated 79 previous convictions and had served multiple prior prison sentences and had spent almost all of the last seven years in prison or psychiatric care after a violent home invasion on a woman pensioner.

Media coverage of the sentencing described Baker's prior convictions as including serious violent offending such as aggravated robbery, violent assaults, kidnapping, threatening to kill witnesses, and assault with intent to wound. Reports also noted a history of breaches of court orders, breach of parole conditions, and reoffending following release from custody. Baker was described at his 2006 murder trial as having "an extremely violent disposition".

In December 2003, while serving part of his earlier 8-year prison sentence at the Special Needs Unit at Auckland Prison, Baker was referred to the Psychological Services of the Department of Corrections for the purpose of providing a report to assist them in managing his behaviour. The report noted that Baker's history suggested that "it is likely that Mr Baker would resort to the use of violence and weapons to further his ends" and "there is some possibility that he may resort to extreme violence in order to obtain fame". The report concluded by saying "Mr Baker would, in a heightened emotional state though while in possession of his faculties, attempt to injure, wound or kill as many victims as possible. Victims would be arbitrarily selected or be representative of a class of authorities who Mr Baker regards as being deserving of retribution".

=== Trial ===
Baker was initially not named by the media until his conviction on 1 December 2006. Baker pleaded guilty to murder in the High Court at Auckland. He was sentenced to life imprisonment with a minimum non-parole period of 18 years. Baker freely admitted to killing Ashley but said the attack was not premeditated and that he attacked Ashley because he believed the boy was a "nark". Baker received a life sentence with a minimum non-parole period of 18 years.

=== Further incidents ===
Following his conviction, Baker remained in the public spotlight after several further violent incidents inside Auckland Prison.

In July 2008, while being returned to Auckland Prison from Auckland City Hospital after treatment for self-inflicted injuries, Baker pulled a concealed shiv on a prison officer in an attempt to escape. The prison officer received minor injuries and Baker was returned to Auckland Prison.

On 27 August 2009, Baker took a fellow inmate, an 83-year-old man convicted of sex offences, hostage in Auckland Prison using a makeshift knife and two razor blades. He demanded to be taken to a less secure prison unit in return for the hostage's safety. Police managed to defuse the situation, and nobody was harmed.

In 2010, Baker was found guilty on charges that resulted from these two incidents and was subsequently sentenced to preventive detention with no possibility of parole for at least 16 years.

On 12 November 2016, Baker was involved in another stand-off at North Shore Hospital when he broke a window and used a shard of glass to threaten corrections officers and hospital staff. The incident was resolved without serious injury.

In June 2020, Baker was convicted and sentenced for throwing boiling jam on another inmate and stabbing him repeatedly with a pen. He was sentenced to three years in prison; however, this will not increase his time spent in prison.

== See also ==
- Suicide of Rodney Hulin
- Killing of Darren Rainey
- Killing of Marcia Powell
- Killing of Frank Valdes
- Death of Chavis Carter
