= Murder of Fred Griffis =

1987 murder of a corrections officer in West Palm Beach, Florida

- Fred Griffis
- Location: 26.724050°N 80.051495°W; West Palm Beach, Florida, US
- Date: June 24, 1987
- Attack type: Murder by shooting Escape attempt
- Deaths: Fred Griffis
- Injuries: Steve Turner
- Perpetrators: William Van Poyck; Frank Valdes
- Motive: Escapes attempts
- Verdict: Guilty on all counts
- Convictions: First Degree Murder; Attempted murder; Aiding in an attempted escape; Aggravated assault; Armed Robbery
- Sentence: Death

The murder of Fred Griffis took place on June 24, 1987, when Griffis, then a West Palm Beach corrections officer, was attacked by two men while escorting an inmate to a dermatologist. During the attack, the two attackers, William Van Poyck (July 4, 1954 – June 12, 2013) and Frank Valdes (also spelt Frank Valdez; October 28, 1962 – July 17, 1999), shot and killed Griffis, a crime for which they were found guilty and sentenced to death between 1988 and 1990. Valdes was killed in prison on July 17, 1999, while Van Poyck remained on death row for close to three decades until he was executed by lethal injection on June 12, 2013.

== Murder ==
On June 24, 1987, two corrections officers, 40-year-old Fred Griffis and 29-year-old Steve Turner, who worked at the Glades Correctional Institution, were tasked with escorting a prisoner, James J. O'Brien (February 13, 1934 – December 30, 2015), to see dermatologist Dr. Steven Rosenberg as he needed to get his nose checked for skin cancer. At that time, O'Brien was serving a life sentence for a second-degree murder charge, which were related to a jewel robbery-murder case. Griffis, who was not armed, drove the prison van while Turner was armed and watched O'Brien, who was kept inside a security cage of the van.

When the van pulled into an alley behind the dermatologist's office, a maroon Cadillac Coupe de Ville pulled up near the van, and two men, 32-year-old William Edward Van Poyck and 24-year-old Frank Joy Valdes, came out of the vehicle while armed with a gun, and at gunpoint, they forced the two correction officers to come out of the van. The duo also took away Turner's gun and kicked him to the ground, and Van Poyck instructed Griffis to unlock the security cage and release O'Brien, whom they befriended during their previous stint in prison. However, Griffis refused to comply, and he was therefore shot twice in the chest and once in the head, and he died as a result.

After murdering Griffis, both Valdes and Van Poyck ordered Turner to hand over the keys to the cage, but he did not have them. Afterwards, the pair tried to shoot at the padlock to release O'Brien, but it failed and they were unable to free him. During the attempt, one of the bullets ricocheted off of the van and struck Turner in the shoulder, wounding him. Meanwhile, a nine-year-old boy heard the gunshots and having witnessed the crime, he called the police and soon after, a police officer arrived and witnessed the pair escaping in their car after they failed to break O'Brien out of the van, and radioed for help. This led to a pursuit, during which at least 12 police cars gave chase after the men's car, and Van Poyck reportedly fired multiple shots at the police cars, hitting three of them. The pursuit stretched from the dermatologist's office to the Palm Beach Lakes Boulevard, and it ended after the pair accidentally crashed their car into a tree, and the duo were immediately arrested. The police searched the car and recovered four pistols from the car: a Hungarian Interarms 9mm semi-automatic pistol, a SIG Sauer 9mm semi-automatic pistol, a Starr .22 caliber semiautomatic pistol, and Turner's Smith & Wesson .38 caliber service revolver.

Background information showed that Van Poyck, Valdes, and O'Brien were acquainted while incarcerated in the Florida prison system. Department of Corrections records show that all three were housed at Florida State Prison in Starke in October 1981. At that time, Valdes was serving a three-year sentence for assaulting a police officer while Van Poyck was serving a life sentence for a 1971 case of robbery with a deadly weapon. Valdes would later serve a seven-year sentence for a subsequent kidnapping conviction, and was released in February 1987 after being paroled at the three-year mark of his sentence; Van Poyck was paroled in October 1986 from his life sentence and another one-year sentence he received for a two-month escape from Union Correctional Institution.

Officer Fred Griffis was the 16th, and till today, the fourth-to-last Palm Beach County law enforcement officer to be killed in the line of duty; the last such case happened in 1993. At the time of his death, Griffis was a Vietnam War veteran and former Army Ranger who became a corrections officer three weeks after he retired from the army, and he was also decorated seven times for bravery throughout his service, and cited twice for saving his fellow soldiers on the battlefield. Griffis was buried at the Palms Memorial Cemetery after a funeral was held in his honor, with his family, friends and colleagues attending the memorial service.

== Trials ==
=== Charges ===
On June 25, 1987, both Frank Valdes and William Van Poyck was charged with the murder of Fred Griffis, and also faced charges of plotting the escape of James O'Brien, who was then transferred to Martin Correctional Institution shortly after the foiled escape plot.

On July 14, 1987, a Palm Beach County grand jury formally indicted O'Brien, Valdes and Van Poyck on charges of first-degree murder for the fatal shooting of Griffis and escape attempt.

=== Van Poyck ===
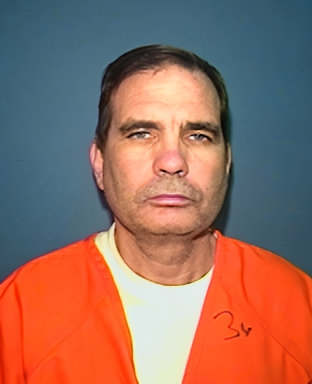
William Van Poyck

On October 31, 1988, Van Poyck was the first member of the trio to stand trial for the murder of Griffis.

During the trial, the prosecution's contention was that Van Poyck was the ringleader of the plot to break their friend O'Brien out of prison and had been the shooter who shot and killed Griffis, while the defence argued that Van Poyck had every intention to help O'Brien escape prison but he never had the intent to commit murder, and also stated that the shooter was Valdes, not Van Poyck. The surviving prison officer, Steve Turner, testified that Van Poyck had pointed a gun at his head and ordered him to search his fallen partner's pockets at the back of the van, while Valdes was at the side of the van trying to shoot the lock. Still, a crime scene investigator testified that the cartridge shells coming from the murder weapon were found in the side of the van, where Valdez was shooting, rather than the back of the van, where Van Poyck was standing and the corpse of Griffis was located.

On November 15, 1988, the jury found Van Poyck guilty of multiple criminal counts, including the first-degree murder of Fred Griffis.

On November 18, 1988, the jury voted 11–1 to recommend the death penalty for Van Poyck. In a hearing before he was formally sentenced, Van Poyck asked for mercy, stating that he had nothing in common with the prisoners on Florida's death row and pleaded to be spared the death sentence, although the family of Griffis did not accept his plea and hoped for the death penalty.

On December 21, 1988, Van Poyck was formally sentenced to death via the electric chair by Circuit Judge Michael Miller. He was additionally sentenced to two consecutive life sentences for both the attempted murder of Griffis's partner and armed robbery with a firearm, plus 110 years for the attempted murder of six police officers, abetment of an escape attempt and aggravated assault.

=== O'Brien ===
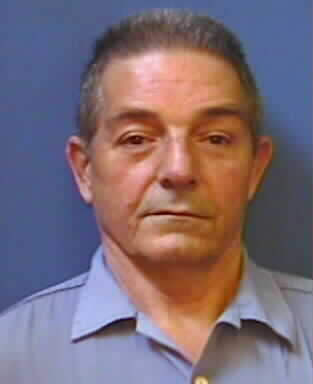
James J. O’Brien

On January 9, 1989, James O'Brien, who remained in prison serving his life sentence, was the second to be put on trial for the murder of Griffis, and while he originally was supposed to stand trial together with the third suspect Frank Valdes, a motion was granted for the duo to receive separate trials and hence O'Brien alone stood trial for the killing. A week later, on January 17, 1989, the trial judge, Circuit Judge Michael Miller, declared a mistrial after a key witness was found mentally incompetent to testify in court, and a new trial was ordered for O'Brien three months later on April 10, 1989.

On April 10, 1989, O'Brien stood trial a second time for the first-degree murder of Griffis. During the trial, the prosecution sought to prove that O'Brien participated in the plot to escape from prison with the help of both Van Poyck and Valdes, and it thus made him complicit in the murder of Griffis, although O'Brien denied that he knew about the plan by both Valdes and Van Poyck to break him out of prison.

On April 13, 1989, the jury found O'Brien not guilty of first-degree murder and other charges related to the attempted escape. After the end of his trial, O'Brien remained incarcerated for the murder he was convicted of back in 1976, and 28 years after the murder of Griffis, O'Brien died in prison on December 30, 2015, at the age of 81.

=== Valdes ===
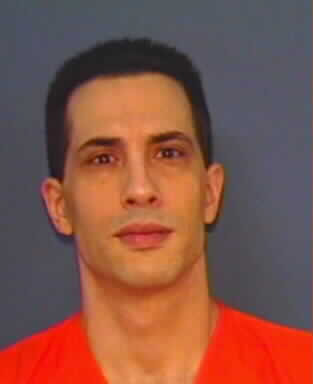
Frank Valdes

Valdes was the third and final defendant to claim trial for the murder of Griffis in May 1990. The prosecution contended during the proceedings that Valdes was a "cold-blooded killer" who was just as culpable as Van Poyck behind the murder of the officer, although the defence submitted that their client was an unwitting and unwilling participant in the escape plan and also denied that Valdes was the triggerman of the case.

Likewise, the surviving corrections officer Steve Turner came to court to testify about the incident, and Valdes's former girlfriend also came to testify against Valdes, admitting that the murder weapon, a .9mm semiautomatic pistol, was bought by her and Valdes back in March 1987. That particular gun, along with another gun they purchased, were registered under her name and was meant for a security management firm that the couple planned to open and operate in the past before Valdes was arrested for Griffis's murder.

On June 7, 1990, Valdes was found guilty of first-degree murder and 11 other charges by the jury.

On June 15, 1990, the jury voted for the death sentence by a 8–4 decision.

On July 27, 1990, Valdes was formally sentenced to death via electrocution by Circuit Judge Walter Colbath.

== Appeals and death of Valdes ==
On September 10, 1993, the Florida Supreme Court upheld the death sentence and murder conviction of Frank Valdes and dismissed his appeal.

In January 1994, Valdes married his wife while in prison, after he was granted permission to do so.

In June 1994, the U.S. Supreme Court denied Valdes's appeal. On August 11, 1994, Valdes requested to waive his remaining rights to appeal.

On July 17, 1999, 36-year-old Valdes died while incarcerated on death row at the Florida State Prison. Investigations showed that Valdes was being assaulted and stomped to death by several prison guards, supposedly to prevent him from informing the press about the mistreatment of inmates. Nine correction officers were charged with second-degree murder, official corruption, battery on an inmate, and aggravated battery, but ultimately, none of the officers were convicted: four were acquitted between 2000 and 2002, while the remaining five had their charges dropped.

== Van Poyck's appeals and death row ==
On July 5, 1990, the Florida Supreme Court dismissed William Van Poyck's direct appeal against his death sentence and murder conviction.

On March 27, 1997, the Florida Supreme Court, by a majority vote of 4–3, denied Van Poyck's second appeal and affirmed his murder conviction.

On May 14, 1998, Van Poyck's third appeal against his conviction was rejected by the Florida Supreme Court.

In October 1999, three months after his co-defendant Frank Valdes was beaten to death by prison guards in Florida State Prison, Van Poyck, who was also held on death row in the same facility, was transferred to a Virginia prison for his safety and he was classified as a potential witness to the fatal attack.

On May 19, 2005, Van Poyck's fourth appeal was denied by the Florida Supreme Court.

On March 20, 2006, the U.S. Supreme Court turned down the appeal of Van Poyck.

On July 15, 2011, Van Poyck's appeal was rejected by the 11th Circuit Court of Appeals.

On February 15, 2012, Van Poyck's fifth appeal was dismissed by the Florida Supreme Court.

During his time on death row, Van Poyck went to prison school, and he became a writer and published three books, one of which won first-place honors in the memoir category in Writer's Digest 2004 Self-Published Book Awards. He also helped many of his fellow prisoners pen their appeals apart from drafting his own, and since 2005, Van Poyck's letters to his sister were published on a blog titled "Death Row Diary", which detailed some of Van Poyck's experiences on death row.

== Execution of Van Poyck ==
On May 4, 2013, Governor Rick Scott signed a death warrant for William Van Poyck, scheduling his execution to be carried out on June 12, 2013.

On May 16, 2013, Van Poyck's appeal was heard by the Florida Supreme Court, and during the hearing, the defence summoned the widow of Van Poyck's co-defendant Frank Valdes on the stand, and she testified that her late husband had privately confessed to her that he was the one who shot and killed the victim Fred Griffis, after he gotten angry with the officer for refusing to open the cell of James O'Brien. Five days later, on May 21, 2013, the appeal was turned down by the Florida Supreme Court.

On May 29, 2013, Circuit Judge Charles Burton declined to issue a stay of execution and rejected Van Poyck's appeal.

On May 30, 2013, U.S. District Judge Mark E. Walker dismissed Van Poyck's appeal against his death sentence.

On June 3, 2013, Van Poyck's defence counsel appealed to the Florida Supreme Court to postpone his execution. Three days later, on June 6, 2013, the appeal was denied by the Florida Supreme Court.

On June 12, 2013, 58-year-old William Van Poyck was put to death by lethal injection at the Florida State Prison. Prior to his execution, Van Poyck declined to request for a special last meal, and before the drugs were administered, Van Poyck said his last words, "Set me free", and he was pronounced dead 23 minutes later at 7:24pm. In response to Van Poyck's execution, one of Griffis's cousins stated that it was a "open-and-shut case" and both Van Poyck and Valdez should have been executed a long time ago, while Steve Turner, the other officer who survived after being shot in the attack, told the press that justice had prevailed for the family of his fallen colleague.

William Van Poyck was the second Palm County prisoner to be executed in Florida since 1976, and his execution was the first in 21 years after the 1992 execution of Nollie Martin for a 1977 kidnap-murder case. Van Poyck remained the last convict to be executed for a Palm County murder case for the following decade until 2023, when Duane Owen was put to death for the killings of a 14-year-old babysitter and a 38-year-old single mother of two in separate cases.

== See also ==
- Capital punishment in Florida
- List of people executed in Florida
- List of people executed in the United States in 2013

Executions carried out in Florida
Preceded by Elmer Leon Carroll May 29, 2013	William Edward Van Poyck; June 12, 2013	Succeeded by John Errol Ferguson August 5, 2013
Executions carried out in the United States
Preceded by Elroy Chester – Texas June 12, 2013	William Edward Van Poyck – Florida; June 12, 2013	Succeeded by James Lewis DeRosa – Oklahoma June 18, 2013
