= Ellis Unit =

Prison in Texas, United States

O.B. Ellis Unit
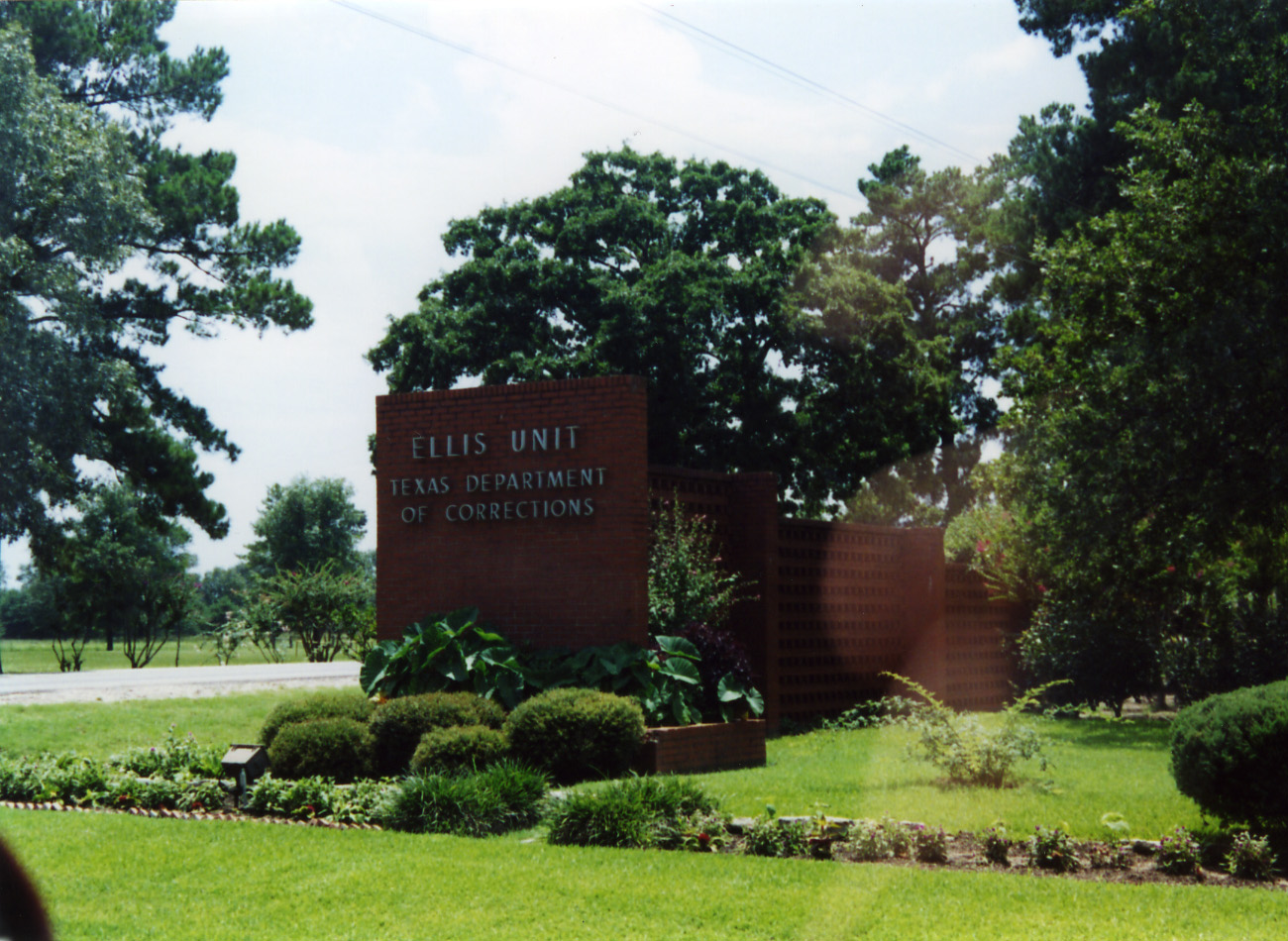

- Location in Texas
- Location: 1697 FM 980 Huntsville, Texas 77343; 30°53′05″N 95°27′18″W
- Status: Operational
- Security class: G1-G5, Administrative Segregation, GRAD/ ASDP, Outside Trusty
- Capacity: Unit: 2,073 Trusty Camp: 409
- Opened: July 1965
- Former name: Ellis I Unit
- Managed by: TDCJ Correctional Institutions Division
- Director: Daniel Dickerson
- Warden: Bruce Johnson
- Website: www.tdcj.texas.gov/unit_directory/e.html

O. B. Ellis Unit (E1, previously Ellis I Unit) is a Texas Department of Criminal Justice prison located in unincorporated Walker County, Texas, 12 miles (19 km) north of Huntsville. The unit, with about 11,427 acres (4,624 ha) of space,‌ now houses up to 2,400 male prisoners. Ellis is situated in a wooded area shared with the Estelle Unit, which is located 3 miles (4.8 km) away from Ellis. From 1965 to 1999 it was the location of the State of Texas men's death row.

== History ==
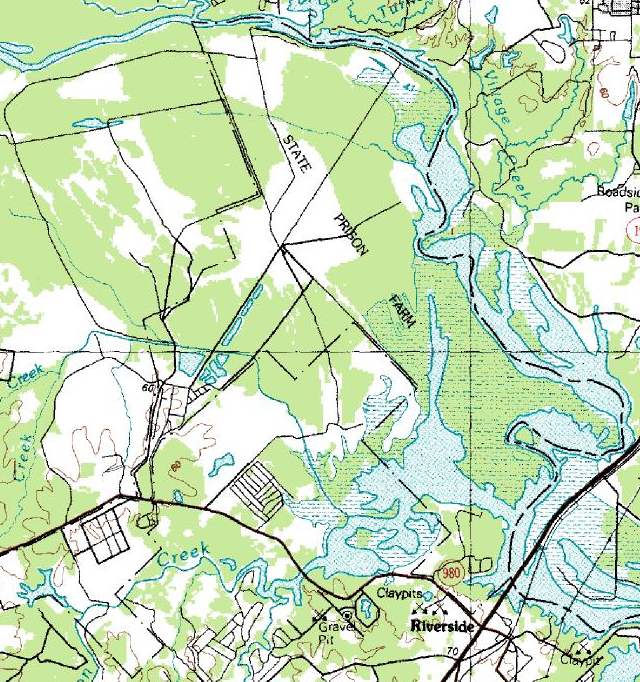
A topographic map of the Ellis Unit, July 1, 1983 - U.S. Geological Survey

The unit opened in July 1965. It was named after Oscar B. Ellis, a former prison director of Texas. George Beto designed the unit, making it to be the strictest prison in the system, and Jim Estelle, the following prison director, continued the course of action Beto established.

From 1965 to 1999 the unit housed the male death row, which had moved from Huntsville Unit. Michael Berryhill, an author, said "You had the toughest convicts, and the general philosophy was you needed the toughest warden. Wallace Pack was assigned to keep the lid on Ellis. The inmates in the prison were restless. There were work stoppages and strikes, and with Judge Justice's opinion, there was an air of expectancy that the brutality and terrible conditions would end." The book In This Timeless Time includes content about the unit's death row.

In April 1981, Eroy Brown, a prisoner who had been convicted of armed robbery and burglary, drowned Wallace Pack, the warden, and shot Billy Moore, the unit's farm manager, during a struggle for Pack's gun. Brown said that they were planning to kill him since he was going to expose a prison theft scheme. Thirty-five of 36 jurors voted in Brown's favor.

After a prisoner named Rodney Hulin fatally injured himself at the Clemens Unit, he was transferred to the Hospital Galveston Unit and then the Ellis Unit. Hulin died in the Ellis Unit in 1997.

In November 1998, six condemned men were absent from their cells for several hours and then coordinated an escape attempt. One of the men, Martin Gurule (TDCJ# 999063), successfully escaped and was later found dead in a location near the prison grounds. TDCJ officials said that he drowned on the day of his escape. According to the TDCJ, the prison escape attempt had hastened the agency's decision to move death row inmates to a new location. TDCJ officials also stated that overcrowding at Ellis was another factor in the death row move.

Six months after the escape attempt, the TDCJ decided to move the death row. The Texas Board of Criminal Justice approved the relocation of the men's death row on Friday May 21, 1999. In 1999 the male death row was relocated to the Polunsky Unit (originally known as the Terrell Unit) in West Livingston, Texas. The first 55 inmates, all classified as being disruptive, were moved on Friday June 18, 1999. The death row transfer, which took ten months, was the largest transfer of condemned prisoners in history and was performed under heavy security.

In 2011, the Ellis Unit furniture and wood plant was moved to the Lewis Unit.

== Facilities ==
It has a capacity of about 2,000 prisoners.

As of 2022 the prison sometimes had temperatures over 90 degrees Fahrenheit since there were no tempered air systems nor air conditioner units.

=== Death row ===
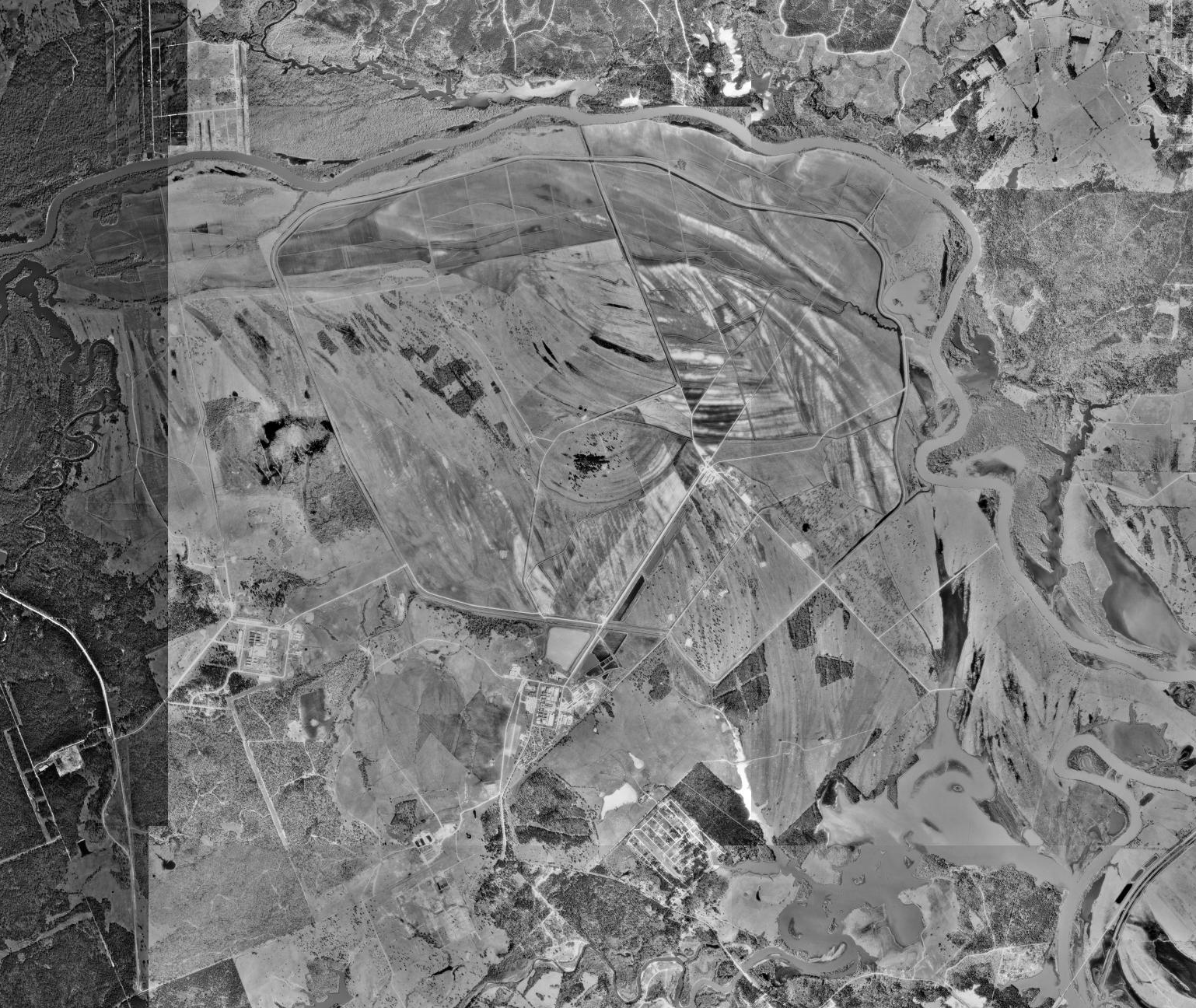
Aerial photograph of the Ellis and Estelle units, March 8, 1989, U.S. Geological Survey

When the unit housed the male death row, condemned inmates worked in a garment factory, played basketball, assisted each other with legal work, and worshiped together. The prison guards allowed other offenders to gather and say goodbye to a death row inmate on the night before his execution. According to death row offender Jonathan Bruce Reed (Texas Department of Criminal Justice Death Row #642, now TDCJ#1743674 due to a reduction of the sentence to life imprisonment on November 3, 2011), the attitude of the death row was "We can afford you some sort of reasonable life—within security confines" and that death row inmates "lived as humans". Reed said that condemned inmates sometimes violated the rules by smoking, getting tattoos, making wine, and engaging in sexual intercourse with other inmates and officers. Privileges decreased as years passed.

The cells at Ellis's death row had bars on them. Sometimes there were two death row inmates per cell. Inmates were permitted to watch televisions located in the facility.

== In popular culture ==
Steve Earle recorded "Ellis Unit One" for the 1995 film Dead Man Walking. The song's lyrics focus on the effect of the death penalty on the guards that carry it out. Earle has been a vocal critic against the death penalty.

== Notable prisoners ==
=== Death row prisoners ===
Former Texas-sentenced inmates (all death row inmates on this list had been transferred to Polunsky Unit in 1999, commuted, released, and/or executed)

- Charles Brooks Jr. (executed December 7, 1982)
- Peter Cantu (perpetrator of the murder of Jennifer Ertman and Elizabeth Peña) transferred to Polunsky Unit, executed August 17, 2010
- Ignacio Cuevas (perpetrator of the 1974 Huntsville Prison Siege) - executed May 23, 1991
- Carlos DeLuna - executed December 7, 1989
- Jeffrey Dillingham - perpetrator of the murder of Caren Koslow, transferred to Polunsky, executed November 1, 2000
- Gustavo Julian Garcia - transferred to Polunsky Unit, executed February 16, 2016
- Humberto Leal Garcia - transferred to Polunsky Unit, executed July 7, 2011.
- Johnny Frank Garrett - executed February 11, 1992
- Gary Graham a.k.a. Shaka Sankofa - moved to Polunsky, executed June 22, 2000
- Jesús Ledesma Aguilar - executed May 24, 2006.
- Kenneth McDuff (TDCJ#999055, executed November 17, 1998)
- José Medellín (perpetrator of the murder of Jennifer Ertman and Elizabeth Peña) - transferred to Polunsky Unit, executed August 5, 2008
- Derrick Sean O'Brien (perpetrator of the murder of Jennifer Ertman and Elizabeth Peña) - transferred to Polunsky Unit, executed July 11, 2006
- Ronald Clark O'Bryan - executed March 31, 1984
- Kenneth Ray Ransom, one of the three perpetrators of the 1983 Malibu Grand Prix murders. Executed in 1997.
- Genaro Ruiz Camacho - executed August 26, 1998
- Hank Skinner - transferred to Polunsky Unit - Died while on death row.
- Edgar Tamayo - transferred to Polunsky, executed January 22, 2014
- Shannon Charles Thomas - transferred to Polunsky Unit, executed November 16, 2005
- Pablo Lucio Vasquez - transferred to Polunsky, executed April 6, 2016
- Coy Wesbrook - moved to Polunsky, executed March 9, 2016
- Marvin Lee Wilson - moved to Polunsky executed August 7, 2012
- Cameron Todd Willingham - transferred to Polunsky Unit, executed February 17, 2004.
- Richard James Wilkerson, one of the three perpetrators of the 1983 Malibu Grand Prix murders. Executed in 1993.

Former federal-sentenced inmates:

- Juan Garza - on July 13, 1999, federal authorities moved Garza, who had committed the crime in Texas but was under a federal death sentence, out of the custody of the TDCJ and into Federal Bureau of Prisons (BOP) custody. Garza was one of three condemned inmates moved from the Texas state male death row on that day due to the opening of the new federal death row wing in USP Terre Haute, Terre Haute, Indiana. (executed in Terre Haute June 19, 2001)
- Louis Jones Jr. (transferred to BOP custody) executed in 2003

== See also ==
- Sherri Jarvis, a long-unidentified murder victim believed to have been searching for the Ellis Unit according to two unrelated witnesses who had met her the day before she was killed.
