= Killing of Frank Valdes =

Death row inmate killing in 1999

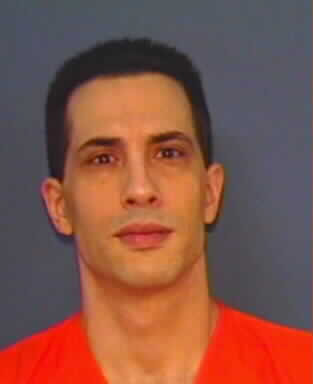
Frank Valdes

On July 17, 1999, American death row inmate Frank Valdes (also spelt Frank Valdez; October 28, 1962 – July 17, 1999), was beaten to death at Florida State Prison in Bradford County. That morning, nine correctional officers, carrying stun guns, entered his cell and fatally stomped him.

== Background ==
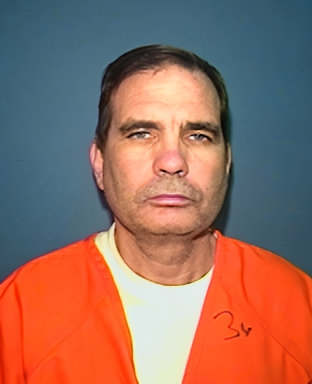
William Van Poyck

Valdes was a career criminal who had been sentenced to death for the 1987 murder of Glades Correctional Institution correctional officer Fred Griffis during an escape attempt. He later privately confessed to his wife that he had gotten angry with Griffis, whom he shot and killed, for refusing to open the cell of an inmate who was supposed to join the escape. Fellow inmate William Van Poyck (July 4, 1954 – June 12, 2013) was sentenced to death for his role in Griffis' murder, and was executed on June 12, 2013.

After Valdes' death, prosecutors of the state criminal trial stated that the attack on him was due to a desire to prevent him from discussing mistreatment of inmates with reporters. The Florida Department of Corrections (FDC) stated that Valdes had threatened one of the officers, leading to an extraction team to be called to his cell.

== Beating ==
The incident occurred in the X-Wing area of the prison. Inmates stated that the correctional officers placed the body in a hallway and used bleach to clean the Valdes cell; the inmates stated that the officers placed Valdes' body in another cell and then called 911. The autopsy showed prints of correctional officer boots in Valdes' skin, 30 fractures on 22 ribs, and a broken jaw, nose, collarbone and sternum. After the beating, Valdes was taken to prison nurse Jimmie Burger, who declared him fit to return to his cell. A few hours later, Valdes was found blue, cold, and not breathing in his cell. He was taken to Shands Hospital in Starke and pronounced dead just over an hour later. That day, the Florida Department of Law Enforcement (FDLE) was notified about the incident.

It was alleged that Valdes committed suicide by diving off his bunk and hitting the bars of the cell. The FDLE ruled that he died due to a beating. The nine officers, who were suspended from their jobs, refused to talk. This prompted the Federal Bureau of Investigation (FBI) to join the FDLE investigation.

== Trial ==
Captain Timothy Alvin Thornton, Sergeant Charles Austin Brown, Sergeant Jason Patrick "J.P." Griffis, and Sergeant Robert William Sauls were indicted by an Alachua County, Florida grand jury on February 3, 2000. The charges were second degree murder, official corruption, battery on an inmate, and aggravated battery. The other five guards also had charges. One defendant was acquitted in 2000. In 2002, Thornton, Griffis, and Brown were acquitted. The jury giving the verdict consisted of five men and one woman. Bill Cervone, the Florida state attorney, dropped the remaining charges in 2002. Cervone argued that the trial was problematic since it was in Bradford County, Florida, where other prisons are located, and cited the two previous acquittals.

Jason Griffis, who was not related to Fred Griffis, accused the trial of being politically motivated.

== Aftermath ==
The Florida Department of Corrections fired all nine officers. Yolanda Murphy, the FDC spokesperson, stated that the nine had falsified reports and used excessive and/or unnecessary force and had, therefore, violated the Department's rules. Valdes' ex-wife and family brought civil suits. In 2002, officials from the United States Department of Justice (USDOJ) stated that they were considering bringing civil rights charges against the three officers. In 2007, a judge signed off on a $735,000 settlement from Florida to Valdes' father.

Jimmie Burger, who declared that Valdes was fit to return to his cell, resigned in August 1999. Shortly after, he was arrested for molesting a child in 1984. He was convicted of attempted sexual battery of a child and sentenced to 20 years in prison in 2000, which was reduced to 15 years in 2009. He was released from prison in 2010. In 2006, James V. Crosby, the secretary of the Florida Department of Corrections and the warden of the Florida State Prison at the time of Valdes's death, pleaded guilty to federal charges for taking kickbacks. He was sentenced to 8 years in federal prison in 2007. Crosby was on vacation when Valdes was killed.

As a result, the FDC added cameras in the X-Wing and began requiring the use of video cameras during cell extractions and planned use of force events.

== See also ==
- Killing of Darren Rainey
- Killing of Marcia Powell
- Death of Chavis Carter
- Suicide of Rodney Hulin
