= Killing of Marcia Powell =

2009 death of incarcerated American woman

Marcia Powell
- Born: Marcia Joann Powell; September 25, 1960; California, U.S.
- Died: May 20, 2009 (aged 48); Goodyear, Arizona, U.S.
- Cause of death: Heat exposure

On May 20, 2009, Marcia Joann Powell, a 48-year-old inmate at Arizona State Prison Complex – Perryville, died of heart failure caused by extreme heat exposure while spending four hours in an outdoor cage. The Arizona Department of Corrections (ADC) was widely scrutinized due to the negligence of attending staff and led the ADC to change its regulations in prisoner safety, policy oversight and the discontinuation of the prison's outdoor prison cages.

== Background ==
Powell was raised with adoptive parents since age six and ran away from home at age 14. As an adult, Powell had a history of drug addiction and homelessness and was noted for mental health issues since at least 1993, when she was diagnosed with "disorganized schizophrenia, polysubstance use and mild mental retardation". She had a juvenile court record in Arizona and was arrested several times as an adult in Arizona, California, and Missouri. The Maricopa County Public Fiduciary Office held legal guardianship over Powell, who was considered an incapacitated adult.

Powell was arrested in Phoenix, Arizona, after she propositioned an on-duty Phoenix PD officer for oral sex in exchange for $20 worth of crack cocaine. While the crime would have normally been classed as a misdemeanor, the charge was upgraded to a felony as the officer had already arrested Powell twice for the same offense. Powell waived her right to trial, asking the judge to "please [not] give [her] too much time". On July 31, 2008, she was sentenced to 27 months imprisonment for prostitution as a repeat offense.

Powell arrived at Arizona State Prison that same year on August 4. She was required to wear shackles whenever out of her cell and frequently placed in isolation at maximum security for infractions such as "drinking coffee out of the wrong cup", in what retired ADC officer Carl Toersbijns has described as "retaliation" and "pettiness".

== Death ==
On May 19, 2009, Powell was supposed to be moved to a psychiatric unit for observation on suicide watch. At 11:00 a.m., Powell was placed in an outdoor cage to await cell transfer, during which she was exposed to temperatures of 107 °F (42 °C) for a period of four hours; the transfer was delayed due to a "disturbance at the observation ward". Prison policy limits such outside confinement to a maximum of two hours. A staffed control room located 20 yards away from Powell's cage had a full view on her. Powell was not provided with water during this time. She collapsed from heat stroke, at 2:40 p.m. and was brought to West Valley Hospital at 3:12 p.m. She was taken off life support at 11:15 p.m. and declared dead at 12:42 a.m.

An autopsy report showed that Powell had first- and second-degree burns and a core body temperature of 108 °F (42 °C). She had burn blisters all over her body. Of several fluid samples taken up on entry into hospital and post-mortem, blood taken from an iliac artery showed traces of benztropine (0.02 mg/l), valproic acid (6.6 mg/l), haloperidol (0.005 mg/l) and lidocaine, all medications prescribed for Powell's mental illness, which increased her sensitivity to heat, sunlight, and dehydration. The county medical examiner found the cause of death to be due to complications from heat exposure, specifically due to electrolyte pattern dehydration, metabolic acidosis with coagulopathy, rhabdomyolysis and acute renal failure. According to a 3,000-page report released by the Arizona Department of Corrections (ADC), she pleaded to be taken back inside but was ignored. She was also not allowed to use the restroom and, as a result, spent her final conscious hours in her own excrement. Powell's death was classed as accidental.

== Aftermath ==
=== Family ===
The decision to take Powell off life support, a choice from ADC director Charles Ryan, was criticized as it was not discussed with Powell's family. Between her admission to the hospital and the cessation of life support, eight hours passed, during which no calls were made. Maricopa County Public Fiduciary Office investigator Roger Coventry found that Powell's adoptive mother Joanne Buck was unaware of her adoptive daughter's death until he found Buck's address at a gated community in La Quinta, California. Powell's adoptive parents had divorced during her childhood and she did not keep close contact with them since running away from home, with her adoptive mother stating that at one point Powell had threatened to kill her. Her adoptive father Ray Powell had died on November 4, 2008.

During Coventry's search for other relatives, he found that she had a biological brother, William Warren Powell (also known as Rusty Lewis), but he could not be located. Coventry also discovered that Powell had two children that were put up for adoption, but her son Richard Hussman had been murdered in Missouri in 2004 and her daughter Eureka Breshard, who lived in Tempe, could not be found. The only next of kin listed in Powell's prison records was Troy Troutman (also spelled Trautman), whom prison officials described as Powell's son, but he could also not be located. Among Powell's several tattoos, which included the name "Troy", were two that read "John" and "John C.", but similarly could not be linked to any relatives.

=== ADC action ===
Prison administrators fired, suspended or disciplined sixteen corrections employees over Powell's death. It was found that the Perryville prison was using the cages as punishment for disciplinary infractions, which was reportedly stopped according to ADC officials. The Maricopa County Attorney's Office chose not to prosecute ADC staff in her death on negligent homicide charges, claiming that there was "insufficient evidence to go forward with a prosecution against any of the named individuals".

== Legacy ==
A memorial service for Powell was held on May 30, 2009, at Encanto Community Church. Powell was cremated and her ashes were interred at Shadow Rock United Church of Christ in Phoenix, Arizona. Powell's adoptive mother did not wish to take possession of her ashes, and she had no other next of kin. In 2010, a memorial to Powell was placed at the Brophy College Preparatory school.

By 2010, the deadline for someone to file a lawsuit in an Arizona court related to this case had expired. There are no people who have standing for a federal lawsuit in regards to this case.

Outdoor cage cells, which were introduced in the 1960s and numbered 233 total in 2009, are still used in Arizona. However, they now provide shade.

The documentary No Human Involved, released on June 26, 2016, centers around Powell's death.

== See also ==
- Box (torture)
- Killing of Darren Rainey
- Killing of Frank Valdes
- Death of Chavis Carter
- Murder of Liam Ashley
- Suicide of Rodney Hulin
- Joe Arpaio, former sheriff in Maricopa County
