= Dean Wickliffe =

New Zealand criminal and prison escapee

Dean Hugh Tekahu William Wickliffe (born 1948) is a notorious New Zealand criminal and prison escapee. He is the only person to have escaped Paremoremo maximum security prison twice, in 1976 and 1991. He was New Zealand's longest-serving prisoner.

== Background ==
His father was an alcoholic and his mother abandoned him at the age of seven after his parents separated. Wickliffe said he had: "a fractious and traumatic childhood that led him down the dark path of crime and the destruction of himself and others." When he was 15, Wickliffe tracked his mother down in Auckland where she was living with her two daughters. She allowed him to move in provided he didn't drink. On his 16th birthday he came home under the influence and she kicked him out. Wickliffe said: "I went to stay at a caravan park and that's when I started to get into real trouble". He has Irish, Scottish and Maori ancestry and jokes that "my Celtic blood leads my Maori blood astray".

== Criminal history ==
Wickliffe was convicted of murdering jeweller Paul Miet during an armed robbery in 1972. At a retrial 12 years later, the charge was reduced to manslaughter based on Wickliffe's claim that he had not meant to hurt anyone. This decision was criticized by Supreme Court Judge Sir Trevor Henry (then retired) because Wickliffe had been armed with a fully loaded semi-automatic pistol.

Wickliffe was released in 1995, but was later found guilty of murdering Bay of Plenty man, Richard Bluett. The conviction was quashed in 1998 and he was acquitted at a retrial.

In April 2010, Wickliffe was sentenced to two years and nine months imprisonment for drug and firearms offences committed in March 2008. In December 2011, six months after his release from that prison term, he was arrested for manufacture and possession of methamphetamine for supply and was sentenced to seven years imprisonment in March 2012.

In 2016, Wickliffe was denied parole, the Parole Board finding that he posed "an undue risk to the community." The board granted parole on 17 May 2017 and he was released, subject to nine conditions for 5 years.

He wrote an autobiography called A Life Behind Bars in 2017.

Wickliffe was recalled to prison in 2018 for drink driving and driving while disqualified, which breached his earlier parole conditions. He was paroled in 2020, with special conditions including that he must reside at an approved address for five years.

He was taken back into custody on 5 March 2025 for breaching the conditions of his parole by not living at his approved address, which had been sold. The following day, he objected to being "double-bunked" and received facial injuries during a confrontation with staff. He began a hunger strike on 10 March. He reappeared before the parole board on 26 March and was released from prison immediately.
