= Auckland Prison =

Prison facility in New Zealand

Coordinates: 36°45′29″S 174°38′41″E

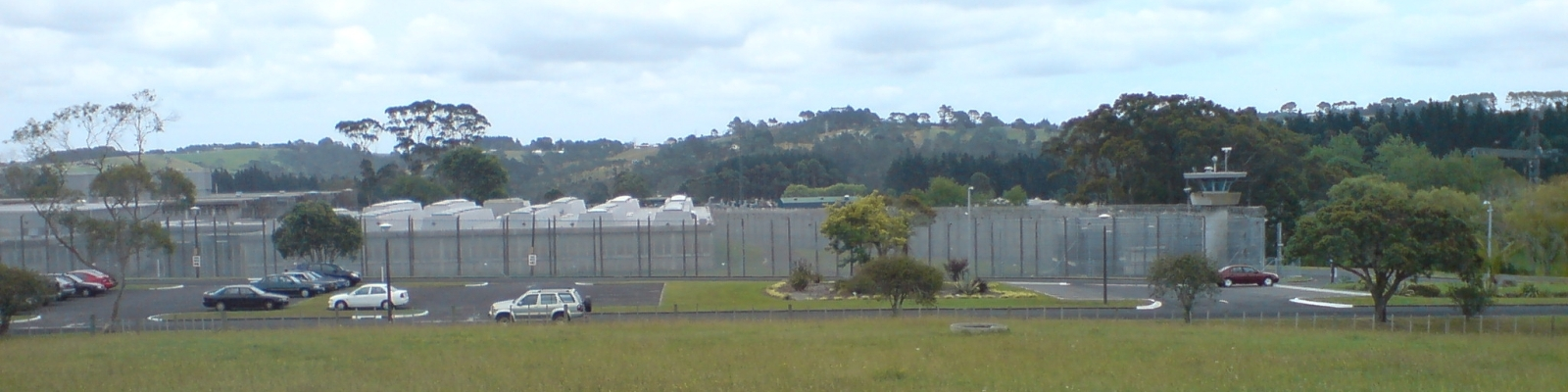
The high-security section of Auckland Prison

Auckland Prison (original name Paremoremo Prison, colloquially Pare, pronounced "Par-re") is a prison facility consisting from minimum security to maximum security units based in Paremoremo, Auckland, New Zealand. The units are separated but located close together in a rural area.

The prison contains 4 of New Zealand's only specialist maximum-security units, housing some of the most severe criminals in the country. Its old names of 'Paremoremo' and 'Pare' are still well-known and used throughout New Zealand.

The land was bought for the prison in 1962 and after the 1965 Mt Eden prison riots construction was expedited, with the prison officially opening in March 1969.

== Organisation ==
=== Facilities ===
Auckland Prison has a capacity of 681 prisoners, however there are currently proposals to increase the capacity of the prison to 1,220. It includes the high security West division, built in 1981 to relieve crowding at other institutions, particularly at Mount Eden Prison; a minimum/low/low-medium security work and pre-release unit called Te Mahinga; and a 60-bed special treatment unit for child sex offenders, called Te Piriti.

Within the maximum security units, conditions in it are very restrictive, and there are minimum three prison officers per inmate of the unit.

=== Security ===
Security was upgraded significantly in the 1990s and 2000s. David Connor, the prison chaplain, noted that when he moved to Paremoremo in 1984, a chain-link fence around the medium-security block was all that was required. In 2010, however, the maximum security part of the prison, East Division, is surrounded by a highly secure perimeter fence covered in razor wire. Razor wire is also laid between the unit and the fence. East Wing has only one point of entry which has a highly sensitive scanner that every person must pass through.

Anyone carrying items into East Division is required to bring them through in a clear plastic bag. Every person entering is also liable to be searched. East Division has a centralised CCTV system, with cameras monitored from the control room in the centre of the wing at all times. All cells are made of solid concrete and have bars on the windows. All exercise yards are enclosed. There is also a higher staff/prisoner ratio in east block than in other units.

West Division accommodates high-medium security prisoners. Like East Wing, it has only one point of entry and any person entering the unit is liable to be searched. There are also CCTV cameras monitored from the guardroom, and sensors between the fences of the West Division.

There is also one minimum security unit, one low-medium security unit and the Te Piriti unit, which houses low security prisoners. These units have a lower level of security as prisoners in these units are deemed to be a minimal risk to public safety.

In case of a serious incident, guards have few options but to call the police. Corrections officers have repeatedly warned that violent inmates are becoming more of a problem (in Paremoremo and the New Zealand corrections system in general).

After a serious attack by inmates on a prison guard in July 2007, a member of the staff anonymously complained to The New Zealand Herald about security procedures being inadequate, and said the prison was more like a 'holiday camp' for prisoners - especially in the case of those considered especially dangerous, alleging that prison management gives in to most of their demands to keep the peace.

On 18 December 2025, High Court Justice Jason McHerron ordered the Department of Corrections' chief executive Jeremy Lightfoot to ensure that maximum security prisoners at Auckland Prison received their legal entitlement to one hour of outdoor physical exercise.

== Notable inmates ==
- Dean Wickliffe has escaped from Auckland Prison twice.
- Triple murderer William Bell was being held in the maximum security Delta Block in 2007. He is serving a life sentence, eligible for parole after 30 years.
- George Charlie Baker, who killed a teenage boy in a prison van, is serving a life sentence, eligible for parole after 18 years.
- Convicted murderer Antonie Dixon was being held in the maximum security area, awaiting sentencing, and committed suicide in February 2009.
- Scott Watson, who was convicted of a double murder at Furneaux Lodge in the Marlborough Sounds on 1 January 1998, was once a prisoner in the maximum security area before he was transferred to Christchurch Men's Prison. He is serving a life sentence, eligible for parole after 17 years.
- Brenton Tarrant is serving a life sentence, held in isolation in the maximum security area for perpetrating the Christchurch mosque shootings.
- Paul Wood, author, motivational speaker, life coach, and psychologist. Served an 11-year sentence.

== See also ==
- List of prisons in New Zealand
