= Dade Correctional Institution =

Prison in Miami-Dade County, Florida, United States

Coordinates: 25°24′49″N 80°29′54″W

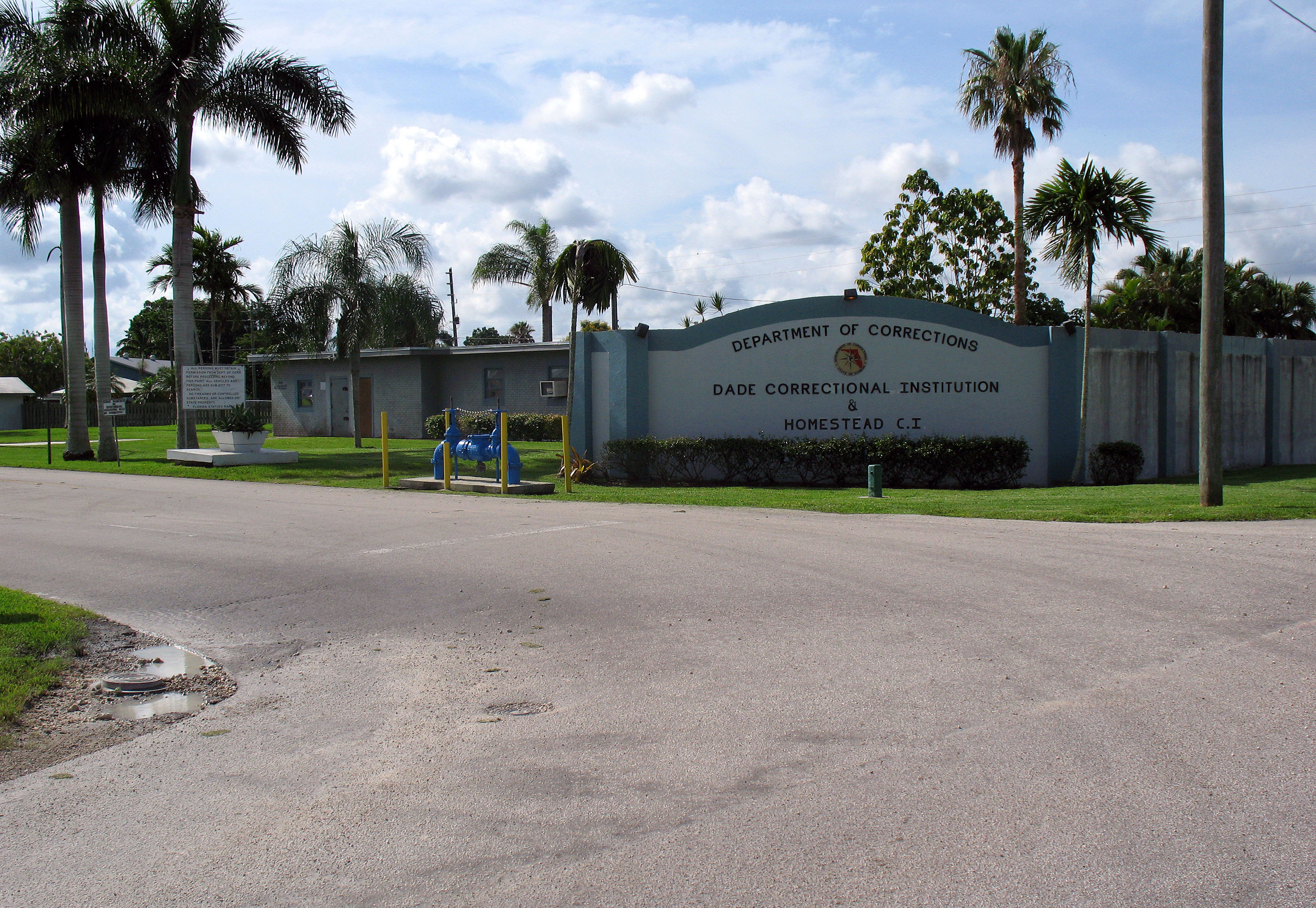
- Entrance to Dade & Homestead CI, 2009
- Interactive map of Dade Correctional Institution
- Location: 19000 SW 377th St #200 Florida City, Florida
- Status: Operational
- Security class: minimum, medium, and close
- Capacity: 1,406
- Population: 1,335 (February 11, 2025)
- Opened: June 1976
- Managed by: Florida Department of Corrections
- Warden: Jimmy Love

The Dade Correctional Institution (Dade CI or DCI) is a prison in unincorporated Miami-Dade County, Florida, near Florida City. This facility houses adult males and minimum, medium, and close security levels. It was established in September 1996 and is part of the Florida Department of Corrections. It is situated right next to the Homestead Correctional Institution, which houses female inmates.

== History ==
The prison was opened in 1976 as a minimum security facility. Originally designed for 528 inmates, it cost US$8.8 million (equivalent to $49,794,000 in 2025) to construct.

== Controversies ==
In 2005, three prisoners escaped for an hour and a half but were captured and sent back to prison.

In May 2014, Julie K. Brown of The Miami Herald penned the inaugural article in a series that delved into the pervasive issues of violence and corruption within Dade County Jail (Dade CI) and other prisons. Her article highlighted the persistent accusations of inadequate treatment of mentally ill inmates, deplorable conditions in the food preparation area, and other pressing concerns.

In 2014 former Dade CI prisoner Harold Hempstead accused prison authorities of fatally torturing prisoner Darren Rainey by scalding him with 180 °F (82 °C) water in a shower for hours, resulting in his body being found with strips of skin burned off. At least eight other prisoners had also been subjected to a scalding shower within Dade's "Transitional Care Unit".

In July 2014, Mike Crews, the FDOC secretary, suspended the warden of the Dade Correctional institution and put him on paid leave. Later that month Cummings was fired. Les Odom became the new warden.

On July 28, 2014, prison authorities discovered 35-year-old prisoner Lavar Valentin dead from strangulation. Valentin had expressed fear of his cellmate and authorities accused the cellmate of killing him.

Another escape occurred in November 2014. West Palm Beach police apprehended the escaped prisoner. This prisoner had a life sentence. Cummings said that he was not surprised by the fact that a prisoner had escaped, saying that he found guards derelict in duty in a surprise inspection. According to Cummings, "[Dade] is, by far, the most dangerous prison I’ve ever worked in."

On April 29, 2022, four correctional officers were arrested for the February beating death of Ronald Ingram during a prisoner transfer. After a lengthy investigation, the Florida Department of Law Enforcement arrested Ronald Connor, Jeremy Godbolt, Christopher Rolon and Kirk Walton. Ingram allegedly threw urine on a correctional officer and was beaten so severely he was carried to the transport van. Ingram was found dead hours later in Ocala, Florida.
