= Killing of Darren Rainey =

2012 fatal torture of an African American inmate in Florida

Darren Rainey

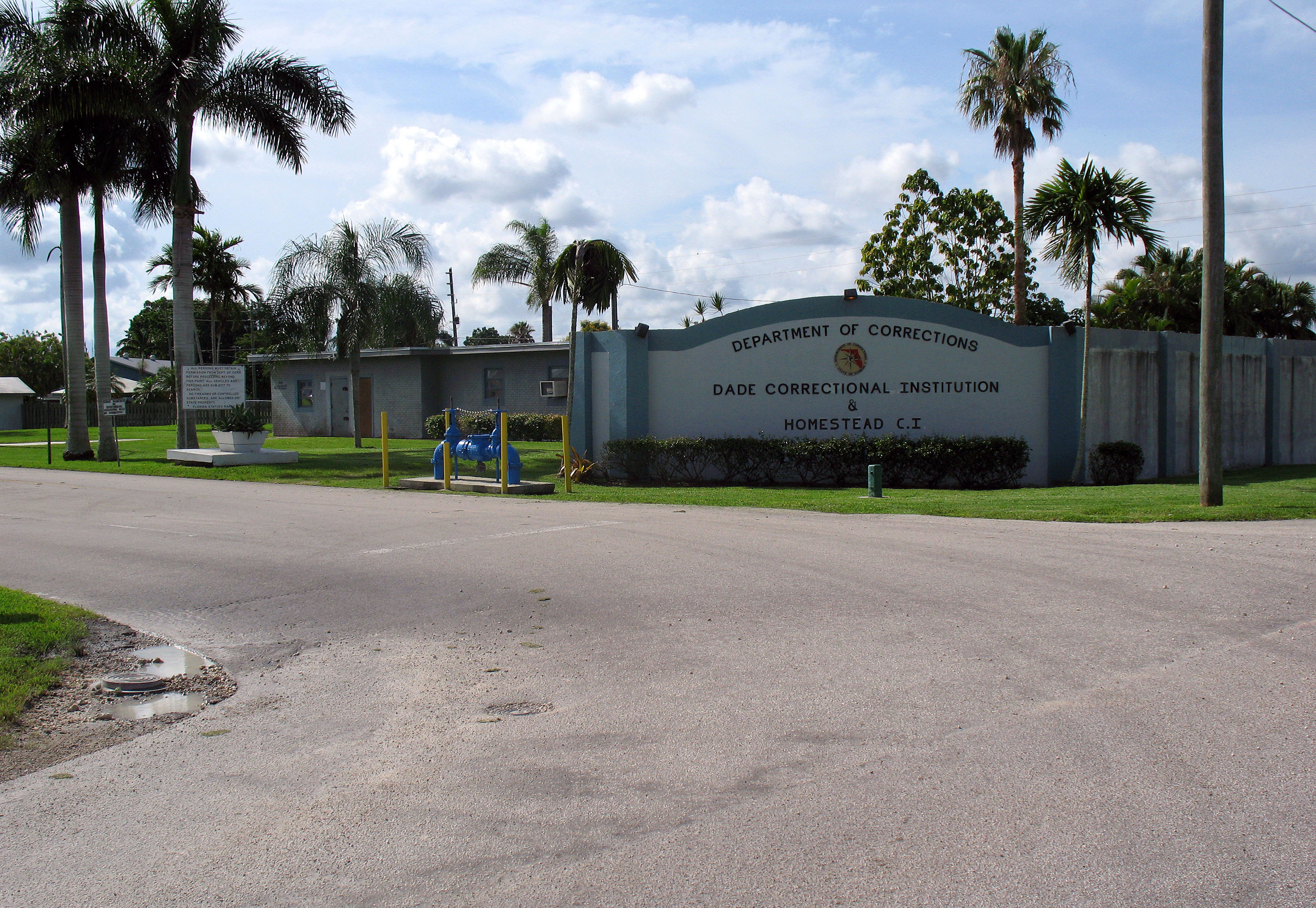
The entrance to Dade Correctional Institution and Homestead Correctional Institution; Rainey died at Dade CI

Darren Rainey (January 12, 1962 – June 23, 2012) died at the Dade Correctional Institution (Dade CI) in unincorporated Miami-Dade County, Florida, on June 23, 2012. The prison is in proximity to Florida City, and is south of Homestead.

In 2014, Dade CI prisoner Mark Joiner accused prison authorities of fatally torturing prisoner Darren Rainey, who was mentally ill, by scalding him in a shower.

On the night of his death, the 50-year-old Rainey had served just a few months of a two-year prison sentence. About 7:30 p.m he allegedly defecated in his cell and smeared feces on himself and on the walls. Guards reportedly put him in the shower with improvised plumbing, telling him they would not let him out until he cleaned himself. According to the state attorney's report, Rainey refused to stand under the steaming hot water. He was found dead about two hours later, lying face up and covered with red patches which appeared to be burns.

Originally, the police classified the death as unexplained, and the DOC did not punish any staff until the warden was fired two years later. Two officers on duty at the time of the death later received promotions. The police began interviewing witnesses after the Miami Herald obtained public records and made a visit to the prison. After filing a lawsuit, the family received a settlement in the matter of Rainey's death.

== Background ==
At the time of his death, Darren Rainey had been serving a two-year sentence for the possession of cocaine, for which he had already been arrested 9 times. He had been diagnosed with schizophrenia.

== Manner of death ==
Rainey was locked in a shower for two hours. It was designed so that he had no control over the temperature of the water, later measured to be 160 °F (71 °C). A paramedic who attempted to help Rainey wrote that he had second- and third-degree burns on over 30% of his body. It subsequently became known that his skin "fell off at the touch".

At least eight other prisoners had also been reportedly subjected to a scalding shower within Dade's "Transitional Care Unit".

== Crime scene and autopsy photographs ==
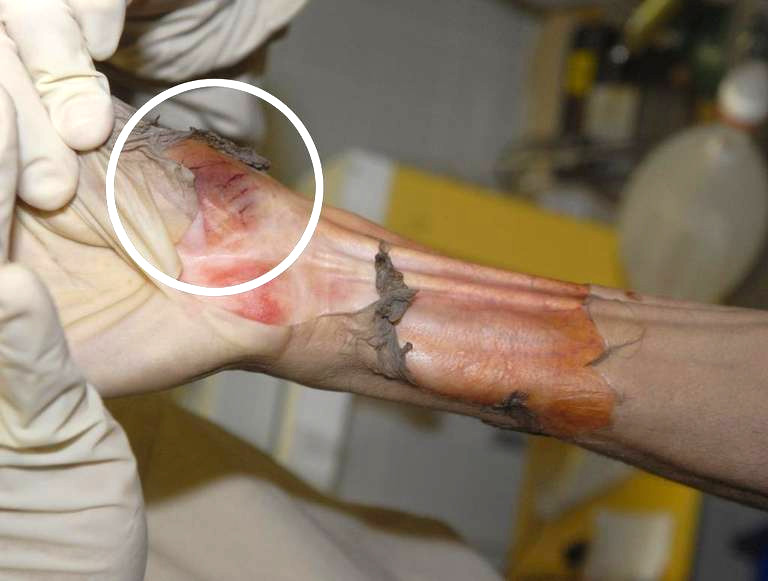
Crime scene photograph showing Rainey's right hand and what appears to be a bruise that could have been caused by him banging at the shower door.

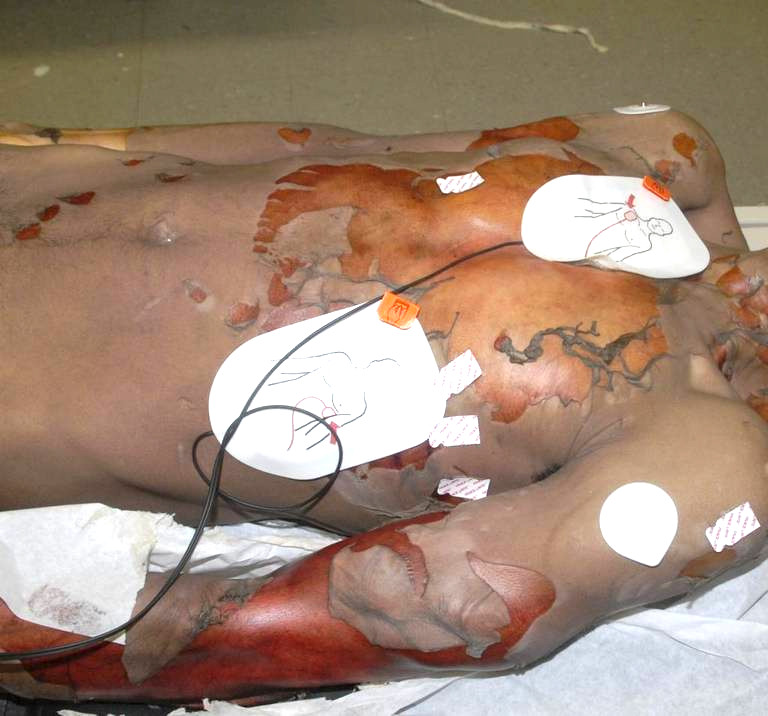
Crime scene photograph of Rainey's body in the prison infirmary right after his death. The white patches are material that staff used in efforts to revive him.

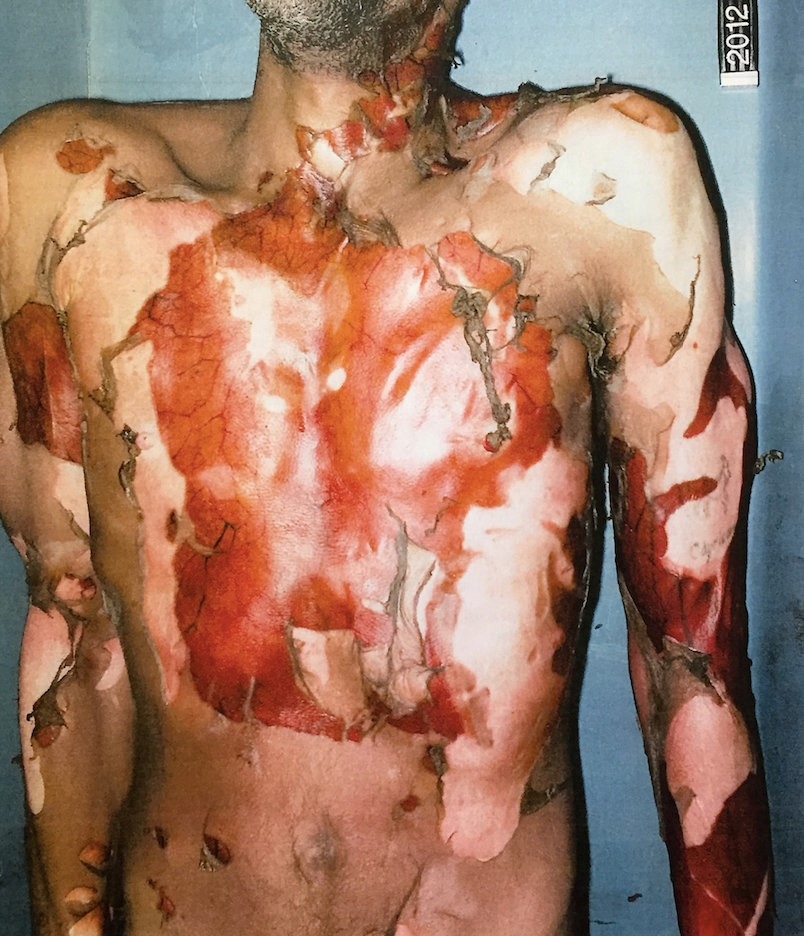
Autopsy photograph of Rainey's torso

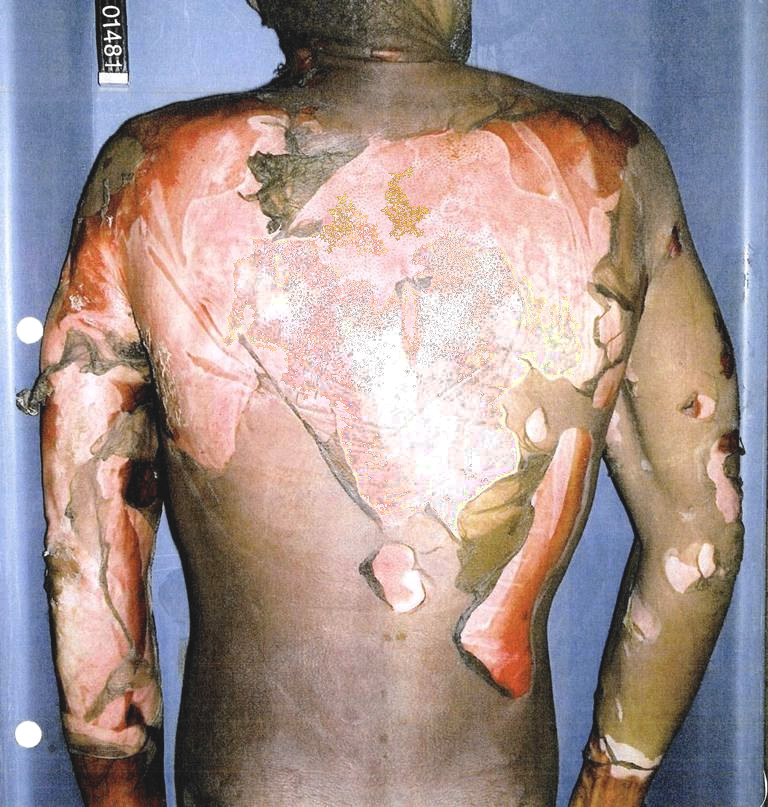
Autopsy photograph of Rainey's back.

== Result of investigation ==
As a result of the police investigation, human rights organizations such as Amnesty International, the American Civil Liberties Union (ACLU) of Florida, and the Florida Council of Churches sent a letter to the United States Attorney General Eric Holder asking for intervention from the U.S. Department of Justice (USDOJ). In April 2014, George Mallinckrodt, a psychotherapist who worked from 2008 to 2011 at the Dade Correctional Institution's psychiatric ward called the Transitional Care Unit, filed a complaint with the USDOJ about the way mentally ill prisoners are treated.

In July 2014 Mike Crews, the FDOC secretary, suspended Jerry Cummings, the warden of the Dade Correctional institution, and put him on paid leave. Later that month Cummings was fired.

By May 2015, the Miami-Dade Police Department had not criminally charged any of the ward's staff, and the Miami-Dade medical examiner not completed a final autopsy report. That month the U.S. Justice Department began investigating Rainey's death.

In January 2016, the Miami-Dade Coroner's Office completed the autopsy of Darren Rainey. The autopsy was leaked to the Miami Herald and ruled Rainey's death as accidental, stemming from a combination of the confinement in the shower, his heart/lung problems and his schizophrenia. The coroner did not determine that the staff intended to hurt Rainey or that the shower had excessive heat. The final autopsy has not been released to the public.

Photographs of Rainey's body were released in 2017.

The family of the deceased filed a lawsuit that was settled in 2018 for $4.5 million.

== See also ==
- Killing of Frank Valdes
- Death of Marcia Powell
- Death of Chavis Carter
- Suicide of Rodney Hulin
- Murder of Liam Ashley
