= Box (torture) =

Method of punishment

The box, also known as a hot box or sweatbox, is a method of solitary confinement used in humid and arid regions as a method of punishment. Anyone placed in one would experience extreme heat, dehydration, heat exhaustion, or even death, depending on when and how long one was kept in the box. Another variation of this punishment is known as sweating, the use of a heated room to punish or coerce a person into cooperating with the torturers.

== Use ==
- Crown Prince Sado of Joseon was executed by being forced into a rice box in July 1762.
- The technique was used by prisons in the Southern United States until late in the 19th century and as punishment during times of slavery.
- The technique, then known as the "sweat box", was used for punishments in the Union Army during the American Civil War.
- The Tarrafal camp, in Cape Verde, used a small windowless shack as a form of torture against prisoners, most of them convicted of conspiring against Salazar's regime in Portugal.
- The North Vietnamese Army used the technique at the infamous Hanoi Hilton.
- In 2008, it was revealed that the U.S. military was detaining Iraqi prisoners in wooden crates, arousing concern of their use as hotboxes.
- The CIA claims that the Chinese government has used "extreme heat" and "sweating" against dissidents.
- Use of a "sweatbox" has also been reported as a method of punishment in North Korean concentration camps, notably in Kang Chol-hwan's book The Aquariums of Pyongyang.
- In 2009, Marcia Powell, a prisoner at Arizona State Prison Complex – Perryville, United States, died of heat exposure after being placed in an outdoor cage for four hours.
- In December 2025, Amnesty International reported the use of a 2 feet (61 cm) × 2 feet (61 cm) cage being used at Alligator Alcatraz. Inmates are placed in the small cage, shackled to the bottom and left in the hot sun for many hours without water, described by the report as torture.

== See also ==
- Sensory deprivation
- Torture and the United States
- Torture chamber
