= Vaughn Ross =

American murderer (1971–2013)

- Born: September 4, 1971; St. Louis County, Missouri, U.S.
- Died: July 18, 2013 (aged 41); Huntsville Unit, Texas, U.S.
- Status: Executed by lethal injection
- Convictions: Missouri; Assault; Auto theft Texas; Capital murder
- Penalty: Missouri; Probation (1997); Texas; Death (September 27, 2002)

Details
- Victims: 2 killed, 1 injured
- Country: United States
- Location: Lubbock, Texas

Vaughn Ross (September 4, 1971 – July 18, 2013) was a Texas murderer. He was a graduate student at Texas Tech University before being convicted for the January 31, 2001, murders of Douglas Birdsall, 53, and Viola Ross McVade, 18, in Lubbock County, Texas.

== Background ==
Viola was the sister of Ross's girlfriend. Douglas Birdsall had been the associate dean at the Texas Tech library. Ross shot both victims. Later the same day, a mountain biker came across the murder scene and found both Douglas's and Viola's bodies in a car. DNA on a latex glove found in Birdsall's car and a sweatshirt Vaughn was wearing had blood of Douglas Birdsall; these were two things that linked Ross to the double murder. In 2002, Ross was found guilty of capital murder and sentenced to death by lethal injection by a jury. Prior to the murders, Ross had previous convictions in Missouri for auto theft and stabbing his ex-girlfriend Regina Carlisle 15 times. He pleaded guilty to these crimes in 1997 and was put on probation.

Ross received attention in Sweden after he agreed to be part of a special theme week about the death penalty in the Swedish newspaper Aftonbladet. Aftonbladet covered his case and his last week alive before his execution and reported live from outside the prison on the day of the execution.

Ross left a final statement before being executed which was revealed to Aftonbladet reporter Carina Bergfeldt. He is buried at Captain Joe Byrd Cemetery.

== See also ==
- Capital punishment in Texas
- List of people executed in Texas, 2010–2019
- List of people executed in the United States in 2013

Executions carried out in Texas
Preceded by John Manuel Quintanilla Jr. July 16, 2013	Vaughn Ross; July 18, 2013	Succeeded by Douglas Alan Feldman July 31, 2013
Executions carried out in the United States
Preceded by John Manuel Quintanilla Jr. – Texas July 16, 2013	Vaughn Ross – Texas; July 18, 2013	Succeeded by Andrew Reid Lackey – Alabama July 25, 2013
