= Suicide of Rodney Hulin =

1996 prison death in Texas, United States

- Date: Injured himself on January 26, 1996, died May 9, 1996
- Type: Suicide by hanging
- Motive: Being raped in prison
- Outcome: Movement that advocated not placing juvenile offenders in adult prisons

Rodney Hulin Jr. (March 2, 1978 – May 9, 1996) became a symbol of a movement that advocated against placing juvenile offenders in adult prisons because he was repeatedly raped and died of suicide there.

Hulin was imprisoned at the age of 17 in the Clemens Unit, an adult prison facility, in unincorporated Brazoria County, Texas (Greater Houston) after illegally starting a fire. He was repeatedly raped in the prison and fatally injured himself there on January 26, 1996. He died from his injuries about three months later, on May 9th.

In 1998, the state settled a lawsuit about its failure to protect Hulin after he reported the rapes. The state did not prosecute the inmates who raped Hulin.

== Crime and sentence ==
Hulin entered the Texas Department of Criminal Justice (TDCJ) system after setting trash on fire. Hulin produced Molotov cocktails and threw them over a fence, which, according to an incident report, "caused a small fire in a pile of empty cans against the outside wall of the residence." At the time of his arrest, Hulin was one month shy of his 17th birthday, and thus was considered a minor under Texas law. However, a 17-year-old under Texas law is considered to be an adult in the state penal system. The juvenile court debated whether to try Hulin as an adult; the political climate of the mid-1990s in Texas supported the trying of juvenile offenders as adults. After the court system decided to try Hulin as an adult, Hulin learned that he had two choices if he took a plea agreement for two charges of second-degree arson: he could enroll in boot camp and probation, and would receive two 15-year sentences if he failed, or he could choose 8 years in prison with the possibility of parole after two years. Hulin chose the latter option.

Hulin spent six months in the Randall County Jail in Amarillo, Texas and three months in the Middleton Unit in Abilene, Texas. He did not report any problems while incarcerated in the two institutions. Hulin was scheduled to be transferred from the unit since Middleton was a unit for testing prisoners so they could be classified to go to permanent prison facilities.

== Suicide ==
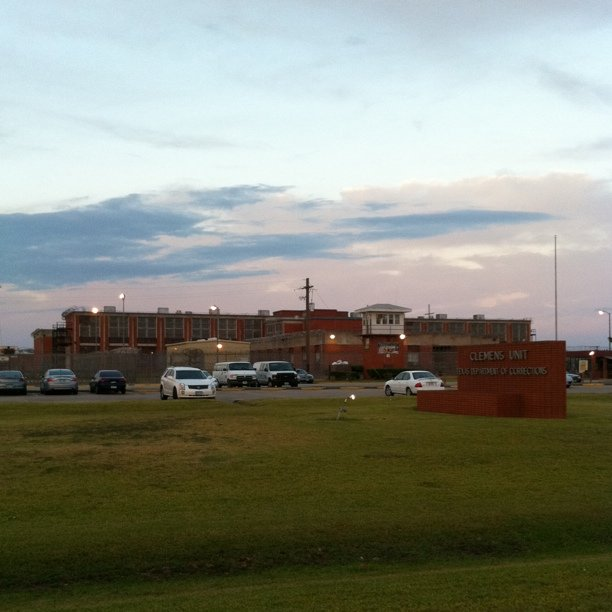
Clemens Unit, where Hulin fatally injured himself

In November 1995, Hulin was transferred to the Clemens Unit in unincorporated Brazoria County, Texas. He reported being raped by fellow inmates around his age after his transfer to a division for younger offenders in the Clemens Unit. On November 17, 1995, a prison doctor examined Hulin for signs of rape; Hulin told the doctor that he had been forced to perform oral sex and then was forced to receive anal penetration. The medical documents stated that Hulin had two "vertical tears" in his rectum. The physician recommended an HIV test, which produced a negative result. Hulin's father stated that Hulin weighed 125 pounds (57 kg) and was 5 feet 2 inches (1.57 m) tall.

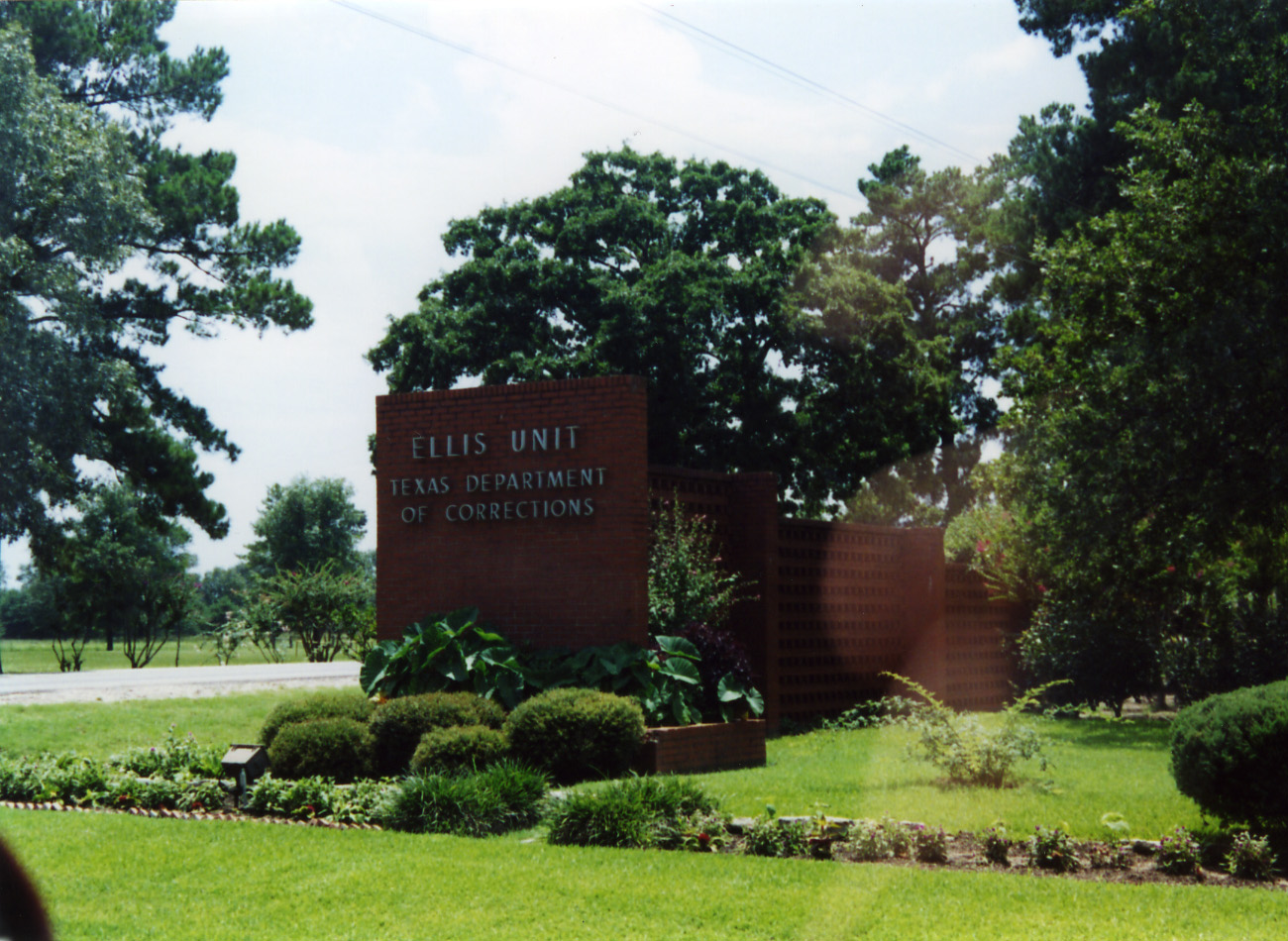
Ellis Unit, where Hulin died

On January 26, 1996, Hulin attempted to kill himself. Hulin was seriously injured and was taken to a Brazoria County area hospital, where medical personnel restored his heartbeat. He was transferred to the prison unit of the John Sealy Hospital in Galveston, Texas and then to the Texas Department of Criminal Justice portion of University of Texas Medical Branch (known as Hospital Galveston) in Galveston. Hulin became 18 years old while in the hospital, at which point he was transferred to the Ellis Unit in unincorporated Walker County, Texas.

Hulin's father, Rodney Hulin Sr., applied for a medical parole on behalf of his son. The parole was granted, and Hulin was scheduled to move into a nursing home in Abilene, Texas on May 11, 1996. Hulin died of his injuries on the evening of May 9, 1996 before he could be transferred to the nursing home.

== Aftermath ==
Hulin's parents filed a lawsuit against the Texas Department of Criminal Justice, saying that the system failed to protect Hulin. In 1998, the case was settled out of court, and the state paid a settlement to the family. The criminal justice system did not attempt to prosecute Hulin's rapists. Human Rights Watch stated that the names of the rapists were known and "witnesses were said to be available".

He became a symbol of a movement that advocated not placing juvenile offenders in adult institutions. Michael Berryhill of the Houston Press stated that there was "irony in [Hulin] becoming a symbol of a cause that likely wouldn't have helped him".

== See also ==
- Murder of Liam Ashley
- Killing of Darren Rainey
- Killing of Frank Valdes
- Death of Chavis Carter
- Killing of Marcia Powell
