= Andrew Lackey =

American murderer (1983–2013)

Andrew Reid Lackey
- Born: October 20, 1983; Alabama, U.S.
- Died: July 25, 2013 (aged 29); Holman Correctional Facility, Alabama, U.S.
- Status: Executed by lethal injection
- Conviction: Capital murder
- Penalty: Death

Andrew Reid Lackey (October 29, 1983 – July 25, 2013) was an American convicted murderer who was executed for the October 31, 2005 murder of Charles Newman, an eighty-year-old World War II veteran. Lackey became the first person executed by the state of Alabama since October 20, 2011; executions had been partly slowed because of a legal dispute over the drugs being used. No further executions would occur in Alabama until the January 2016 execution of Christopher Brooks.

== Murder and arrest ==
Lackey broke into Newman's Limestone County home on Halloween night in 2005. Lackey had been told by Newman's grandson that there was a vault in the home containing gold bars and cash. Newman made a call to 911 on the night of the murder, in which he could be heard saying, “Don’t do that,” ”Leave me alone” and “What do you want?” Lackey could be heard repeatedly asking, “Where’s the vault?” according to court records. It is believed that Newman grabbed his gun and shot Lackey, who then stabbed Newman with a knife about seventy times. Lackey also shot Newman in the chest with his own gun. Police arrived at the residence five minutes after the call was made, where they found Newman's body.

Lackey drove to a convenience store, where he called an ambulance. He was taken to Huntsville Hospital and treated for the gunshot wound. Police received a phone call indicating that Lackey was at the hospital. He was taken into custody after being released from treatment.

== Trial ==
Lackey was charged with capital murder during a burglary, capital murder during a robbery, burglary and robbery. Lackey's attorneys argued that he had a mild form of autism, but did not attempt an insanity defense.

Psychologist Frank Preston, who examined Lackey, testified that he was socially awkward and showed signs of autism, but overall did not appear to have any serious mental disorder.

== Execution ==
Following a suicide attempt, Lackey gave up all appeals and asked that an execution date be set. The Equal Justice Initiative (EJI) argued that Lackey, who was diagnosed with Asperger syndrome and was taking psychotropic medications, should have undergone a mental health examination. EJI filed papers requesting that Lackey be examined for competency, but this was denied by the Court of Criminal Appeals and the execution was allowed to proceed.

Lackey was executed by lethal injection at Holman Correctional Facility near Atmore, Alabama, on July 25, 2013.

== See also ==
- List of people executed in Alabama
- List of people executed in the United States in 2013

Executions carried out in Alabama
Preceded by Christopher Thomas Johnson October 20, 2011	Andrew Reid Lackey; July 25, 2013	Succeeded by Christopher Eugene Brooks January 21, 2016
Executions carried out in the United States
Preceded by Vaughn Ross – Texas July 18, 2013	Andrew Reid Lackey – Alabama; July 25, 2013	Succeeded by Douglas Alan Feldman – Texas July 31, 2013
