= Death of Chavis Carter =

2012 Black American death in police custody

- Date: July 29, 2012
- Venue: Police patrol car
- Location: Jonesboro, Arkansas, U.S.
- Type: Death in custody
- Cause: Gunshot wound
- Outcome: Ruled suicide by Arkansas State Crime Lab
- Deaths: 1 (Chavis Carter)
- Inquiries: FBI; Jonesboro Police Department; Arkansas State Crime Lab
- Coroner: Arkansas State Crime Lab
- Arrests: 1 (Chavis Carter, prior to death)
- Verdict: Suicide
- Weapon: .380-caliber Cobra semi-automatic pistol

Chavis Carter

The death of Chavis Carter occurred on July 29, 2012. Carter, a 21-year-old African-American man, was found dead from a gunshot while handcuffed in the back of a police patrol car. His death was ruled a suicide by the Arkansas State Crime Lab.

== Event ==
Jonesboro (Arkansas)

Carter was in the passenger seat of a pickup truck which was stopped by the Jonesboro Police Department of Jonesboro, Arkansas. It was reported that an officer found small amounts of cannabis on his person after a body search and ran his information through the police computer network. The officers discovered that he had an outstanding warrant, so they placed him under arrest, searching him again and handcuffing his hands behind his back before placing him in the patrol vehicle.

Minutes later, the officers discovered that Carter had been shot in the head. The officers found a semi-automatic, .380-caliber Cobra pistol near the body.

== Aftermath ==
The Jonesboro Police Department believe that Carter had hidden the gun on his person, that the officers did not detect it through the two searches, and he had used it on himself. Carter's mother disagreed, later stating "I think they killed him,” claiming he had no history of suicidal thoughts or actions, and he had called his girlfriend to advise her that he would contact her from jail. She also stated that Chavis was left-handed and was handcuffed behind his back, yet the bullet entered through his right temple. The two officers at the scene were placed on administrative leave and an investigation was started.

A video was released by the police in which a police officer of similar height and build to Carter shows how Carter could have shot himself while handcuffed in a police car. A witness to the event said the police were outside the vehicle when the shot was fired.

The FBI were requested by the Jonesboro Police Department to investigate the death.

The local NAACP sponsored a vigil. There were several protests in Jonesboro due to many not believing the police explanation of Carter's death.

On August 20, 2012, the Arkansas State Crime Lab ruled the death as a suicide.

== Similar deaths ==
Jesus Huerta, in Durham, North Carolina, in 2013, and Victor White III, in Louisiana in 2014, both died under similar circumstances.

== See also ==
- Killing of Frank Valdes
- Killing of Marcia Powell
- Killing of Darren Rainey
- Suicide of Rodney Hulin
- Murder of Liam Ashley
