= Elroy Chester =

American serial killer (1969–2013)

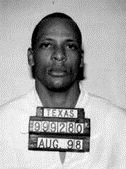
- Born: June 14, 1969; Port Arthur, Texas, U.S.
- Died: June 12, 2013 (aged 43); Huntsville Unit, Texas, U.S.
- Status: Executed by lethal injection
- Motive: Anti-white racism
- Convictions: Capital murder Burglary (4 counts)
- Penalty: Death (September 26, 1998)

Details
- Victims: 5 murdered 5 injured 5 raped
- Span of crimes: August 3, 1997 – February 6, 1998
- Country: United States
- State: Texas
- Weapons: Lorcin .380 Auto pistol.22 caliber pistol

Elroy Chester (June 14, 1969 – June 12, 2013) was an American serial killer, rapist, and burglar who committed five murders in Port Arthur, Texas, between 1997 and 1998. During the six-month span of the killings, Chester was also responsible for a string of home invasions and sexual assaults in the same area.

Chester was convicted and sentenced to death for one of the murders, and was executed in 2013. The execution was controversial as Chester's family and his defense argued that Chester was intellectually disabled, and should have been ineligible for the death penalty after Atkins v. Virginia.

== Early life ==
Chester was born in Port Arthur, Texas, and attended Abraham Lincoln High School. He was enrolled in special education classes until age 16, never progressing past a third-grade level of education. On four out of five IQ tests, including one he took at age seven, Chester scored 70 or lower, the lowest of which was 57 on a Vineland Adaptive Behavior Survey, taken in October 1987, when he was 18 years old. As an adult, he worked on-and-off as a general laborer and was briefly employed as a service worker at a Luby's cafeteria.

=== Prior criminal record ===
On February 20, 1987, Chester robbed a home and was arrested five days later. On April 8, after his trial was set for August that same year, Chester paid bail, during which time he graduated high school. On May 9, Chester again burglarized a residence, leading to another arrest on May 17 and being held in Jefferson County jail without bail. On August 3, he was sentenced to 10 years probation and was imprisoned in a Texas Department of Corrections facility for six months as shock probation.

Following his release on March 29, 1988, Chester committed another two burglaries on May 11 and May 25, for which he was sentenced to 13 years imprisonment on December 19. Chester was released on parole on February 13, 1990, and detained by police just over a month later on March 16 for theft, possession of a criminal instrument, and evading arrest. He was released after three days due to a lack of evidence. On April 1, Chester was arrested for burglary and two counts of aggravated assault, which never went to trial after the district attorney dismissed the case.

In 1991, Chester was arrested twice, once in August for unlawfully carrying a weapon and again in October for marijuana possession; however, he was released the day of his arrest each time, for time served and on bond respectively. In September 1992, he was arrested for burglary and aggravated sexual assault. He was released on October 21 on bond, then rearrested on December 1 on a parole warrant. He served four years in prison and was released on March 21, 1997, with mandatory supervision.

== Crimes ==
Five months after his parole release, between August 1997 and February 1998, Chester perpetrated at least 25 burglaries, five sexual assaults, and ten shootings in Port Arthur, Texas. Chester confessed to the killing of five people and four non-fatal shootings during this timeframe. In every case but one, the victims died in their homes during the night. During most home invasions, Chester disabled the telephone landlines, unscrewed outdoor security lights, and wore either a hockey mask or home-made balaclava to conceal his identity.

On August 3, 1997, Chester burglarized the house of Kenneth Risinger, stealing a .380 semi-automatic pistol, which he would later use in the murders. On August 9, Chester broke into another home, where he forced a ten-year-old girl into a closet, tied her up and sodomized her. Chester later claimed that he was unaware of the victim's age and that he would have "gotten her momma" instead had he known. Chester unsuccessfully tried to rob Candice Tucker on August 14, then robbed Dolly DeLeon the following day. On August 16, Chester knocked on the bedroom window of 16-year-old Oscar Morales and demanded money at gunpoint. When Morales attempted to run away, Chester shot him in the leg and fled. Chester attempted the same at the house of Matthew Horvatich, whom he shot in the shoulder when he walked towards the window. Both Morales and Horvatich survived.

On September 20, Chester murdered 78-year-old John Henry Sepeda during a night-time burglary. Sepeda was sleeping next to his wife and grandson when he awoke due to Chester's presence. Chester killed Sepeda by shooting him once in the chest. In November of the same year, five gang members were arrested as suspects in the crime. Two were released while three remained jailed until two weeks after Chester was indicted for the Sepeda murder. Between October 25 and November 8, Chester committed three more burglaries.

On November 15, Chester fatally shot 87-year-old Etta Mae Stallings and stole a .22 caliber gun belonging to Stallings' husband from their house. The same evening, Chester used the gun to fire several shots through the open bedroom window of a nearby house, injuring Peggy Johnson and Debra Ferguson as they slept, also fatally striking a pet dog.

On November 20, Chester attacked 40-year-old Cheryl DeLeon outside her front door as she arrived home from work. Chester knew DeLeon, as they were formerly co-workers at Luby's, and had been stalking the victim for an indeterminate amount of time with intentions of robbing her. DeLeon was pistol-whipped and killed after being shot in the throat. On December 7, Chester ambushed Lorenzo Coronado outside his house, shot him in the head, and took his wallet before leaving. Coronado survived the shooting.

On December 21, the body of 35-year-old Albert Bolden Jr. was found in his home. He had been dead for several days and his cause of death was a gunshot wound to the head. Bolden was Chester's common-law brother-in-law and, according to Chester, an occasional accomplice in his burglaries. Chester confessed that he had killed Bolden out of vengeance, stating that Bolden had beat Chester's sister during their marriage and that Bolden humiliated him by arranging a sexual encounter between Chester and a transvestite, which Chester was unaware of.

On February 6, 1998, Chester broke into the residence of the Ryman DeLeon family (no relation to Cheryl DeLeon), which he had previously burglarized and stolen items from without incident. This time, he had seen 17-year-old Erin and her one-year-old son while casing the building and decided to attack Erin at gunpoint. During the burglary, Erin's 14-year-old sister Claire and her boyfriend arrived at the house and also were taken hostage. After Chester forced all three teenage victims to undress, he blindfolded and tied them up with duct tape. Chester then raped Erin and forced both girls to perform oral sex on him at gunpoint. During the rape, 38-year-old Willie "Billy" Ryman III, the maternal uncle of the DeLeon sisters, arrived outside the home by car, accompanied by his fiancée Marcia Sharp. Ryman, a city firefighter who worked alongside his sister, was worried about his nieces due to the recent burglaries in the city. As Ryman walked through the back door, Chester fatally shot him in the chest. At the request of Claire, Chester ran outside to check if there were more people besides Ryman, at which point the sisters locked the door, then went to retrieve a handgun kept for self-protection from upstairs. Outside, realizing he was locked out, Chester attempted to steal Ryman's pickup truck. He unsuccessfully attempted to shoot open the lock and upon spotting Sharp inside, Chester fired two gunshots at her, but missed. Chester tried to find another way back inside the house, but was scared off by a stray shot fired by his former hostages and fled down the street.

=== Arrest ===
On February 8, thirty hours after the rape of the DeLeon sisters and the murder of Willie Ryman, Chester was arrested for an unrelated violation of city ordinance. While in custody, police charged him with the non-fatal burglaries. The next day, a search warrant was obtained for Chester's residence, as well as an order for hair and blood samples. Before the samples were taken at the district attorney's office, Chester admitted without prompting that he had "killed the fireman", but did not elaborate further. The search of Chester's house found stolen jewelry and various masks that were connected to the break-ins and sexual assaults, after which Chester volunteered to accompany officers to the place where he had hidden the gun used in the majority of the burglaries. He directed police to the home of his father, and offered to grab the gun in place of the officers, claiming it was in a "hard to reach place" within a hollow ceiling space. Chester was kept in handcuffs and held under close watch before being restrained when he appeared to reach towards something. Officers recovered the weapon which, contrary to Chester's assurances, was fully loaded. The DNA samples matched with those found at the DeLeon crime scene further connected Chester to three additional rapes.

Chester provided five sworn statements to the authorities and said he had committed these offenses because he was out of his mind "with hate for white people" due to lingering resentment over an altercation that he had once gotten into with a white employee of the Texas Department of Criminal Justice. The victims of the murders, rapes, and burglaries were mostly white, albeit some were black and Latino. The racial demographics of Port Arthur was majority black (38%), followed by Latino (31%) and then white (22%) as the third largest group.

== Trial ==
Chester's trial began in August 1998. Chester entered a guilty plea, and during the trial, he made multiple outbursts, as well as threatening the lives of police officers, prison guards, court officials, and the families of jurors, and at one point declared, "If I hadn't shot my brother-in-law, I'd still be out there shooting white folks." He voiced no regret for the murders, describing the crimes as "a whole lot of fun".

He was convicted of the murder of Willie Ryman III and the assault of the two nieces. It took the jury only 11 1/2 minutes to agree on a death sentence for Chester, after he went on a tirade during which he threatened to kill employees of the district attorney's office if he ever got released and have "his homies" kill a police officer who had arrested him on burglary charges in 1988, as well as two detectives involved in the investigation of his murders should he receive capital punishment.

The Texas court system ruled that Chester was legally competent to be executed, despite scoring 69 points on a court-ordered IQ test and being placed in the Texas Department of Criminal Justice's Mentally Retarded Offenders Program during previous prison stints. In the prosecution's closing arguments, it was argued that his disability was not a sufficient reason to stay his execution.

Since Chester was capable of hiding facts and lying to protect his own interests, using masks and gloves, removing the serial numbers from the stolen firearms, and cutting exterior telephone lines before entering homes to burglarize, he showed persuasively that he was capable of forethought, planning, and complex execution of purpose. Therefore, the court found the evidence insufficient to support the claim that Chester was mentally incompetent. Jefferson County assistant district attorney Wayln Thompson described Chester as "only learning disabled" and "one of the most dangerous individuals we have ever prosecuted".

In 2007 and 2008, Chester filed a habeas corpus writ, alleging that his death sentence was against the Eighth Amendment and constituted cruel and unusual punishment. Out of thirteen federal and state judges, eleven rejected his appeals in their entirety, while the remaining two found only "some merits" in the argumentation. In October 2012, the Supreme Court refused to hear an appeal from Chester.

== Execution ==
Chester was originally scheduled for execution on April 24, 2013, but, due to an error in the execution warrant, the date was pushed back.

He was executed on June 12, 2013, at the Huntsville Unit, Huntsville, Texas, two days before his 44th birthday. Chester's final statement was spoken on the gurney:

I just want to say I don't want you to have hate in your heart for me because I took your loved one. I know it doesn't mean anything. I told the truth because I feel like you should know who killed your loved one. God watches everything. Don't hate me. If you do, you'll have to deal with Him later. For me, live your life but don't hate me. I'm sorry for taking your loved one.
[To the lawyer], thank you for fighting for me in the courts. Thank you for supporting me for all these years. Elroy Chester wasn't a bad man. I knew me. A lot of people say I didn't commit those murders, I really did it.
That's my statement. Warden, you can go ahead.

He was pronounced dead at 7:04 p.m. He is buried at Captain Joe Byrd Cemetery.

== In media ==
In 2013 a full-length documentary titled Killing Time was made about him and his execution.

In 2018 the case was covered by the Investigation Discovery show Murder by Numbers, in an episode named "Clown Mask Murders".

== See also ==
- List of people executed in Texas, 2010–2019
- List of people executed in the United States in 2013
- List of serial killers in the United States

Executions carried out in Texas
Preceded by Jeffrey Demond Williams May 15, 2013	Elroy Chester; June 12, 2013	Succeeded by Kimberly LaGayle McCarthy June 26, 2013
Executions carried out in the United States
Preceded by Elmer Leon Carroll – Florida May 29, 2013	Elroy Chester – Texas; June 12, 2013	Succeeded by Murder of Fred Griffis – Florida June 12, 2013
