= Jesús Ledesma Aguilar =

Mexican national (1963–2006)

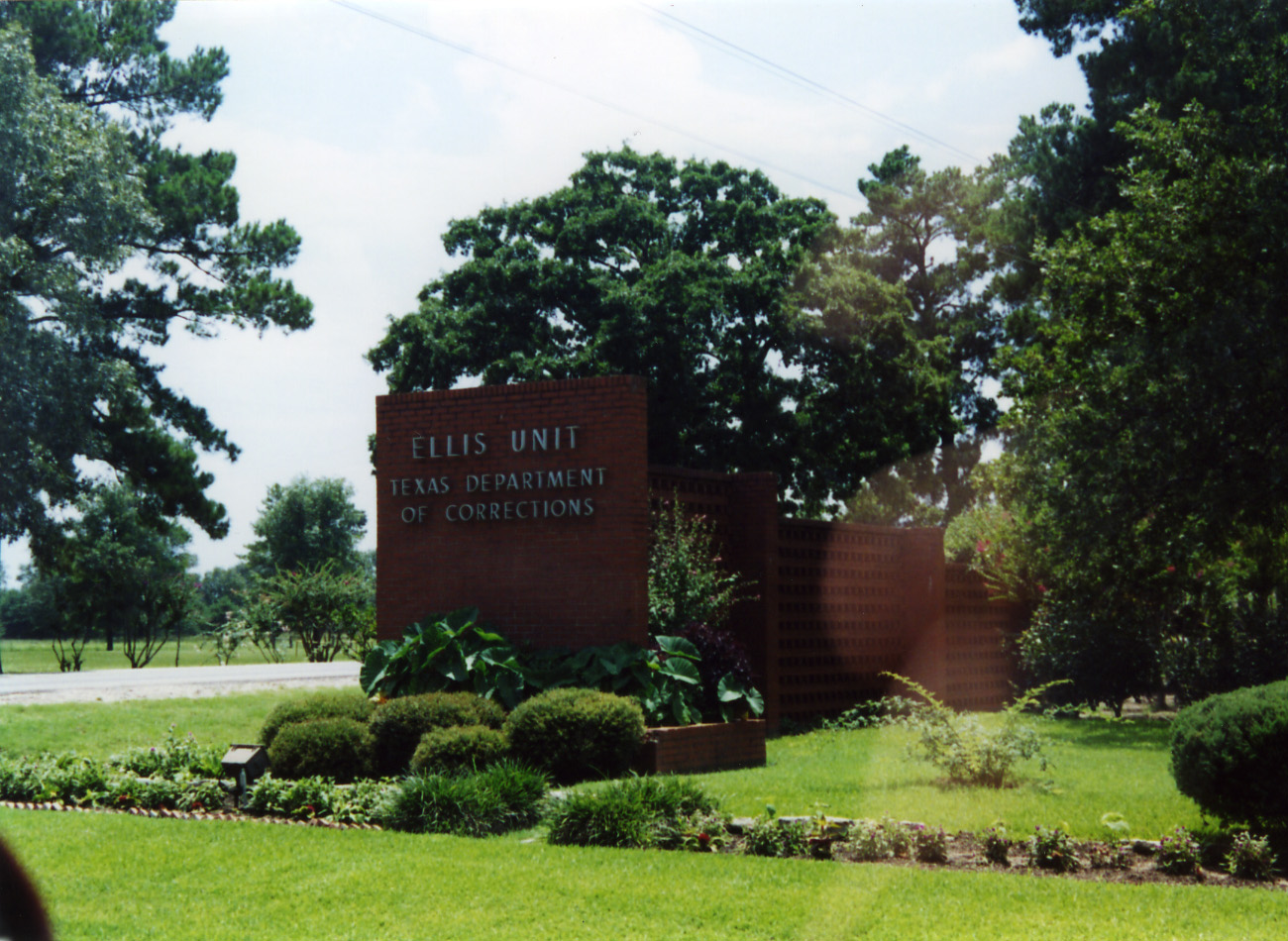
The Ellis Unit housed the State of Texas death row for men until mid-1999.

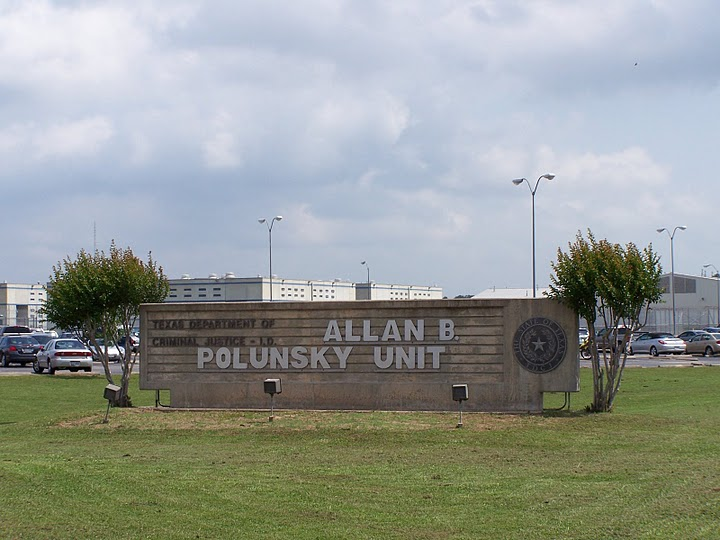
Allan B. Polunsky Unit houses the State of Texas death row for men.

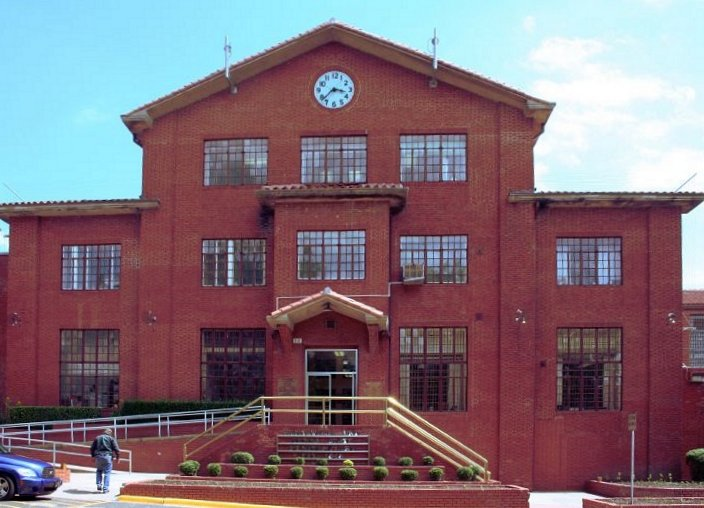
Huntsville Unit, where Ledesma was put to death

Jesús Ledesma Aguilar (November 28, 1963 – May 24, 2006) was a Mexican national who became the 365th person executed by the U.S. state of Texas. His execution sparked an international incident between the United States and Mexico, which led to a lawsuit filed by Mexico against the United States in the International Court of Justice, in which the court found that Texas prison officials had denied Aguilar his right to see a Mexican consular official as specified in the Vienna Convention on Consular Relations.

== Crimes ==
Aguilar was convicted by a Texas court of murdering two people, Leonardo Chavez and Annette Chavez, on June 10, 1995, with a handgun and sentenced to death on July 5, 1995. He did not know his victims. The couple's son said he witnessed the murders and testified against Aguilar at trial. Aguilar filed numerous appeals and requests for stays of execution, all of which were denied. He was executed on May 24, 2006 at 6:32 p.m. CST by lethal injection, despite his continued claims of innocence and protests by the government of Mexico that he was denied his right under the Geneva Conventions to a visit by a Mexican consular official. Aguilar's nephew and co-defendant Christopher Quiroz was sentenced to life for his role in the crime.

The ICJ found that the United States "has breached its obligations to Mr. Avena and 50 other Mexican nationals and to Mexico under the Vienna Convention on Consular Relations." As a result of the court's ruling, Texas officials now provide official notification to the Mexican government if a Mexican national is arrested and incarcerated in a Texas jail, and allow consular officials to visit Mexican nationals in prison.

== Incarceration and execution ==
Aguilar, Texas Department of Criminal Justice (TDCJ)# 999191, was received by the prison system on May 13, 1996. Ledesma was initially located in the Ellis Unit, but was transferred to the Allan B. Polunsky Unit (formerly the Terrell Unit) in 1999. Put to death at Huntsville Unit, he was executed on May 24, 2006.

== See also ==
- Capital punishment in Texas
- Capital punishment in the United States
- List of people executed in Texas, 2000–2009
- List of people executed in the United States in 2006
