= Steven Ray Thacker =

American killer executed in Oklahoma (1970–2013)

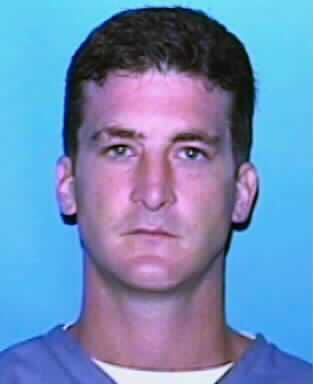
- FDOC mug shot of Steven Ray Thacker
- Born: November 21, 1970; Oklahoma, U.S.
- Died: March 12, 2013 (aged 42); Oklahoma State Penitentiary, Oklahoma, U.S.
- Status: Executed by lethal injection
- Convictions: Oklahoma; First degree murder Kidnapping; Rape; Missouri; First degree murder Tennessee; First degree murder
- Penalty: Oklahoma; Death (first-degree murder); Ten years' imprisonment (kidnapping); 50 years' imprisonment (rape); Missouri; Life imprisonment without the possibility of parole (murder); Tennessee; Death (first-degree murder)

Details
- Victims: Laci Dawn Hill, 25; Forrest Reed Boyd, 24; Ray Patterson, 52
- Date: December 23, 1999 – January 2, 2000
- Locations: Oklahoma, Missouri, Tennessee
- Imprisoned at: Riverbend Maximum Security Institution (Tennessee; 2002–2013); Oklahoma State Penitentiary (Oklahoma; 2013)

Steven Ray Thacker (November 21, 1970 – March 12, 2013) was an American convicted murderer who murdered a total of three people in three different states across the U.S. On December 23, 1999, Thacker kidnapped, raped and murdered 25-year-old Laci Dawn Hill in Oklahoma before he fled to Missouri in a stolen car. During a robbery in Missouri, Thacker killed 24-year-old Forrest Reed Boyd and subsequently drove Boyd's car to Tennessee, where he killed 52-year-old tow truck driver Ray Patterson.

Thacker was arrested in Tennessee on January 2, 2000 and was charged by the authorities of Tennessee, Missouri and Oklahoma for all the three murders. Thacker was sentenced to life in prison by the Missouri courts for the murder of Boyd. He also received death sentences in Tennessee and Oklahoma for the murders of Patterson and Hill respectively. Thacker was ultimately executed by lethal injection for Hill's murder in Oklahoma on March 12, 2013.

== Murder spree ==
Between December 23, 1999 and January 2, 2000, Steven Ray Thacker killed three people in three different states across the U.S.

=== Laci Dawn Hill ===
On December 23, 1999, in Bixby, Oklahoma, Thacker arrived at the house of 25-year-old Laci Dawn Hill (May 13, 1974 – December 23, 1999), after he responded to an advertisement put up by Hill, who wanted to sell a pool table. However, Thacker entered Hill's home with the intention of robbing her. When Thacker held Hill at knifepoint, the latter informed Thacker that they could go to a nearby ATM to retrieve some money. With the failure of the robbery bid, Thacker kidnapped Hill from her house and took her to a remote cabin, where he raped her.

After raping Hill, Thacker decided to murder her in order to silence her and avoid getting caught. He first strangled Hill with his hands and/or a piece of cloth before he went on to plunge the knife into Hill's chest twice, causing her death. Thacker hid Hill's lifeless, half-naked body on the cabin floor covered with box springs and several mattresses.

Hill's body was found by the police six days after her murder. The police managed to identify Thacker as the murderer after investigations indicated that he had stolen Hill's debit and credit cards to purchase Christmas gifts for his family. By then, Thacker had already fled to Missouri in a stolen car.

=== Forrest Reed Boyd ===
On January 1, 2000, in Aldrich, Missouri, 24-year-old restaurant supervisor Forrest Reed Boyd (March 18, 1975 – January 1, 2000) became Thacker's second victim.

While on the run for murdering Hill, Thacker broke into Boyd's home. He had previously spent the past two days hiding in the forested areas to avoid the manhunt, burglarizing several houses, and narrowly evading capture several times. It was during one of these burglaries on January 1, 2000 that Boyd interrupted Thacker as he was robbing Boyd's house. Boyd was subsequently murdered by Thacker, who stabbed him several times.

=== Ray Patterson ===
On January 2, 2000, Thacker, who escaped to Dyersburg, Tennessee after murdering Boyd, killed the third and final victim of his multistate spree.

Thacker was driving Boyd's stolen car in Tennessee when it broke down: as a result, he contacted a towing company for assistance. Fifty-two-year-old tow truck driver, Ray Patterson (March 23, 1947 – January 2, 2000), responded to the call and arrived at the scene to help Thacker move the car. However, when Thacker tried to use a credit card he had stolen from Boyd to make payment, Patterson discovered that the card was stolen and confronted Thacker. Thacker then stabbed and killed him.

After murdering Patterson, Thacker went into hiding at Union City, Tennessee, registering for a room under an alias. Soon after, Tennessee authorities discovered Boyd's stolen car at the motel and arrested Thacker on the same day as Patterson's death.

== Murder trials and sentencing ==
After his arrest, Steven Thacker faced multiple murder charges for the killings he committed in Tennessee, Oklahoma and Missouri and also faced trials in all three states for the homicides.

=== Tennessee ===
Thacker's first murder trial took place in Tennessee. Although prior arrangements between the authorities of Missouri, Oklahoma and Tennessee had led to the decision to make Thacker stand trial in Oklahoma first, it was ultimately decided that Thacker's first trial would be conducted in Tennessee.

On February 6, 2002, the Tennessee jury found Thacker guilty of murdering Patterson as charged., and on February 8, 2002, Thacker was sentenced to death by that same jury.

=== Oklahoma ===
After he was convicted by the courts of Tennessee for the murder of Patterson, Thacker was extradited back to Oklahoma to stand trial for the rape and murder of Laci Hill. The extradition order was granted despite the opposition of Thacker's lawyers, and Thacker stated in September 2002 that he would not plead guilty. Nonetheless, on December 2, 2002, the date when jury selection was to begin, Thacker pleaded guilty to the kidnapping, rape and murder of Hill.

On December 23, 2002, Thacker was sentenced to death by District Judge James Goodpaster after the jury had recommended the death sentence in their verdict three days earlier. This marked the second death sentence Thacker received for his offences. In addition to the death penalty, Thacker also received jail terms of ten years and 50 years for the charges of kidnapping and rape respectively.

It was further reported that in an agreement between the governors of Oklahoma and Tennessee, Thacker's execution would be carried out in the state where his appeals were first fully exhausted. Gene Haynes, Oklahoma's district attorney from Mayes, Rogers and Craig counties, told the newspaper The Oklahoman that it was more likely that Thacker would be executed in Oklahoma rather than Tennessee, given that the appeal process itself was faster in Oklahoma compared to other states.

=== Missouri ===
After Thacker's conviction for the rape and murder of Hill, Missouri authorities sought an extradition order to allow Thacker to stand trial for the murder of Forrest Boyd in Missouri before he could return to Tennessee to continue his death row detention.

On September 16, 2003, Thacker pleaded guilty to the charge of first-degree murder for Boyd's death. Circuit Judge John W. Sims sentenced Thacker to life imprisonment without the possibility of parole.

== Appeals ==
After the end of his murder trials, Steven Thacker was incarcerated on death row at the Riverbend Maximum Security Institution in Tennessee. He spent the next decade appealing his death sentences in Oklahoma and Tennessee.

On December 18, 2003, Thacker's first appeal was denied by the Tennessee Court of Criminal Appeals.

On October 21, 2004, the Oklahoma Court of Criminal Appeals dismissed Thacker's appeal of his death sentence for murdering Laci Hill.

On April 27, 2005, the Tennessee Supreme Court rejected Thacker's appeal of his death sentence for murdering Ray Patterson.

On July 30, 2010, the Dyer County Circuit Court in Tennessee rejected Thacker's petition for a new trial.

On March 23, 2012, Thacker's second appeal to the Tennessee Court of Criminal Appeals was declined.

On April 23, 2012, the 10th Circuit Court of Appeals dismissed Thacker's appeal of his death sentence in Oklahoma.

On October 23, 2012, Thacker's federal appeal of his Tennessee case was dismissed by Judge J. Daniel Breen of the U.S. District Court for the Western District of Tennessee.

== Execution ==
On January 7, 2013, Oklahoma Attorney General Scott Pruitt petitioned the Oklahoma Court of Criminal Appeals to schedule an execution date for Steven Thacker, who had exhausted all appeals of his death sentence in Oklahoma. The petition was filed by Pruitt just 60 days after the U.S. Supreme Court rejected Thacker's final appeal.

On January 17, 2013, the Oklahoma Court of Criminal Appeals approved the Thacker's death warrant and ordered that his death sentence be carried out on March 12, 2013.

On February 12, 2013, a month before he was due to be executed, Thacker, who was being held on death row at the Riverbend Maximum Security Institution in Tennessee, was transferred to the Oklahoma State Penitentiary in Oklahoma, where his death sentence for the rape and murder of Laci Hill in Oklahoma would be carried out.

Originally, a clemency hearing to decide whether or not to commute Thacker's death sentence to life without parole was scheduled on February 22, 2013. Thacker, however, voluntarily waived his right to a plea for clemency.

On March 12, 2013, 42-year-old Steven Ray Thacker was put to death by lethal injection at the Oklahoma State Penitentiary. In his last words, Thacker expressed remorse for his crimes, asked for forgiveness, and apologized to his friends and the victims' families. Thacker was the first person from Oklahoma to be executed in 2013, as well as the fifth person executed in the U.S. in that year.

For his last meal, Thacker ordered a large meat lover’s pizza, a small bag of peanut M&Ms and an A&W root beer.

== See also ==
- Capital punishment in Tennessee
- Capital punishment in Oklahoma
- List of people executed in Oklahoma
- List of people executed in the United States in 2013

Executions carried out in Oklahoma
Preceded by George Ochoa December 4, 2012	Steven Ray Thacker; March 12, 2013	Succeeded by James Lewis DeRosa June 18, 2013
Executions carried out in the United States
Preceded by Frederick Treesh – Ohio March 6, 2013	Steven Ray Thacker – Oklahoma; March 12, 2013	Succeeded by Rickey Lynn Lewis – Texas April 9, 2013
