= Clemens Unit =

Prison farm in Texas

Clemens Unit (CN)
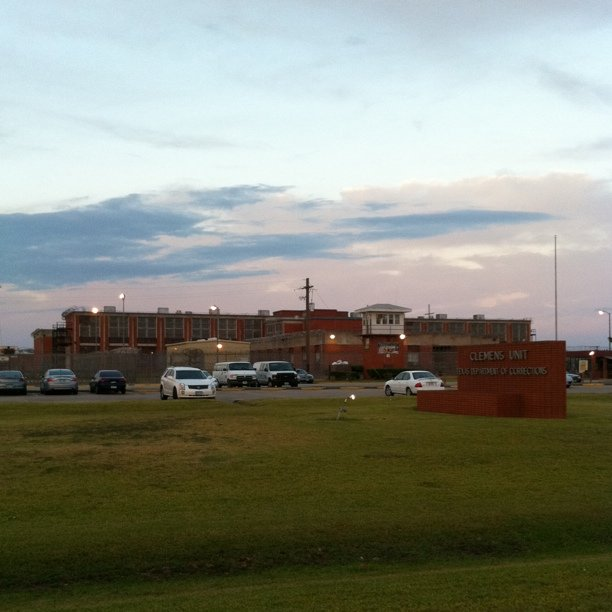
- Interactive map of Clemens Unit (CN)
- Location: 11034 Highway 36, Brazoria County, Texas 77422; 28°59′22″N 95°31′06″W
- Status: Operational
- Security class: G1–G4, Administrative Segregation, Outside Trusty
- Capacity: Unit: 894 Trusty Camp: 321
- Opened: 1893
- Managed by: Texas Department of Criminal Justice
- Warden: Michael Bates
- Website: www.tdcj.state.tx.us/unit_directory../cn.html

Clemens Unit (CN) is a prison farm of the Texas Department of Criminal Justice (TDCJ) in unincorporated Brazoria County, Texas, in Greater Houston. The prison, with about 8,008 acres (3,241 ha), is located at the intersection of Farm to Market Road 2004 and Texas State Highway 36. The prison, in the Texas Gulf Coast region, is in proximity to the City of Brazoria, and it is in proximity to the Velasco community, now a part of Freeport. The prison is situated south of Houston. The unit, which opened in 1893, was named after William C. Clemens, the chairman of the Texas Prison Board.

== History ==
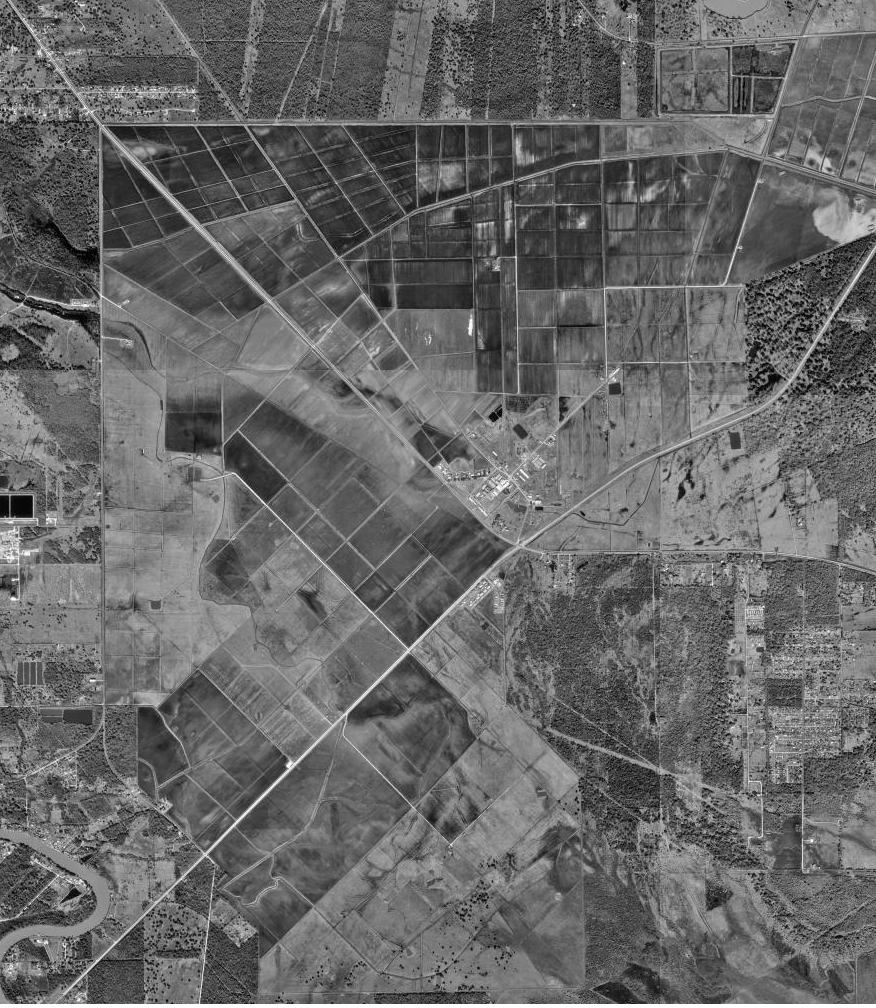
Aerial photograph, January 23, 1995 – U.S. Geological Survey

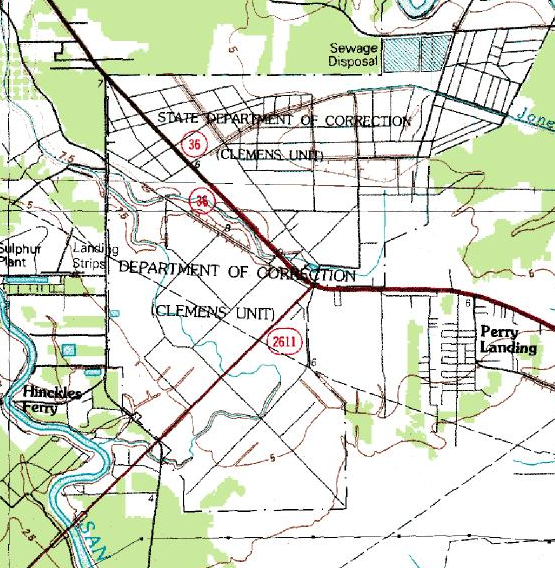
Topographical map, July 1, 1984 – U.S. Geological Survey

In 1890 William C. Clemens, the chairman of the Texas Prison Board, purchased an initial parcel of land from the Huntington Estate for $4,126. The prison, named after Clemens, opened in 1893. The State of Texas bought the entire prison, then 5,527 acres (2,237 ha), in 1899. The property included the William Clemens mill and sugar plantation. The prison was the first state prison in Brazoria County.

The state later added a neighboring plantation, making Clemens have 8,212 acres (3,323 ha) of land. The state purchased additional acreage, bringing the prison to a total of 8,116 acres (3,284 ha). In 1935 Clemens housed African-American prisoners when the system was segregated. In 1963, before racial desegregation occurred, the facility housed first offender African Americans.

In the mid-1990s, the Texas Department of Criminal Justice (TDCJ) removed older violent offenders from the institution and replaced them with younger offenders; most of them were 25 or younger. The administration segregated younger prisoners from the others; the inmates called their area a "kiddie farm." In 1995 the State of Texas lowered its minimum age at which a juvenile can be tried as an adult from 15 to 14. Wayne Scott, the executive director of the TDCJ, established the Youth Offender Program, to house prisoners 14 to 16 years old who were sentenced as adults, new arrivals aged 17–20, and prisoners transferred out of the Texas Youth Commission, aged 16–18 and with determinate sentences.

Rodney Hulin, a 17-year-old prisoner, reported being raped, harassed and assaulted by fellow inmates of his age group after his November 1995 transfer to a division for younger offenders in Clemens. Although he became a symbol of a movement that advocates keeping juvenile offenders housed separately from adults in prison institutions, his case was more complex, as he was attacked by prisoners his own age. Michael Berryhill, a journalist who wrote at length about this case, found that the prison was not yet organized to support its population. After being attacked and harassed, and failing to gain protection from prison officials, Hulin hanged himself. He was saved but had suffered severe brain damage and died four months later.

The unit would see three inmate escapes over an eight month period starting in 2023. On October 6th, 2023, inmate Cadarion Avery escaped from the unit's trusty camp by walking off the grounds. He was recaptured the next day in an abandoned house. On December 17th, 2023, inmate Robert Yancy Jr. escaped from the unit and was recaptured the next day. Two others, including Yancy's mother, were arrested and charged with aiding his escape. On June 22nd, 2024, inmate Kidanny Robles walked away from the unit's trusty camp. He was recaptured the following day, three miles away after being shot in the arm after failing to obey commands.

== Operations ==
As of 2004 Clemens produces agricultural products such as edible and field crops and livestock. As of that year most of the inmates at Clemens, at all custody level, are second-time offenders.

== Notable Inmates ==
- David Brooks (Accomplice of Dean Corll)
- Rodney Hulin

== Cemeteries ==
The prison has two historic cemeteries. One, a cemetery of offenders who died from a virus epidemic, is located near the unit dog kennels. The second cemetery, in the Two Camp area on the Huntington Estate, has the graves of Thomas and Thompson McNeil.
