= List of people executed in the United States in 2013 =

Thirty-nine people were executed in the United States in 2013, thirty-eight by lethal injection and one by electrocution. Sixteen of them were in the state of Texas. One (Kimberly LaGayle McCarthy) was female.

== List of people executed in the United States in 2013 ==
| No. | Date of execution | Name | Age of person | | | Gender | Ethnicity | State | Method | Ref. |
| No. | Date of execution | Name | At execution | At offense | Age difference | Gender | Ethnicity | State | Method | Ref. |
|---|---|---|---|---|---|---|---|---|---|---|
| 1 | January 16, 2013 | Robert Charles Gleason Jr. | 42 | 39 | 3 | Male | White | Virginia | Electrocution | |
| 2 | February 21, 2013 | Carl Henry Blue | 48 | 29 | 19 | Male | Black | Texas | Lethal injection | |
| 3 | February 21, 2013 | Andrew Allen Cook | 38 | 20 | 18 | Male | White | Georgia | Lethal injection | |
| 4 | March 6, 2013 | Frederick Treesh | 48 | 30 | 18 | Male | White | Ohio | Lethal injection | |
| 5 | March 12, 2013 | Steven Ray Thacker | 42 | 29 | 13 | Male | White | Oklahoma | Lethal injection | |
| 6 | April 9, 2013 | Rickey Lynn Lewis | 50 | 28 | 22 | Male | Black | Texas | Lethal injection | |
| 7 | April 10, 2013 | Larry Eugene Mann | 59 | 27 | 32 | Male | White | Florida | Lethal injection | |
| 8 | April 16, 2013 | Ronnie Paul Threadgill | 40 | 28 | 12 | Male | Black | Texas | Lethal injection | |
| 9 | April 25, 2013 | Richard Aaron Cobb | 29 | 18 | 11 | Male | White | Texas | Lethal injection | |
| 10 | May 1, 2013 | Steven T. Smith | 46 | 31 | 15 | Male | White | Ohio | Lethal injection | |
| 11 | May 7, 2013 | Carroll Joe Parr | 35 | 25 | 10 | Male | Black | Texas | Lethal injection | |
| 12 | May 15, 2013 | Jeffrey Demond Williams | 37 | 23 | 14 | Male | Black | Texas | Lethal injection | |
| 13 | May 29, 2013 | Elmer Leon Carroll | 56 | 34 | 22 | Male | White | Florida | Lethal injection | |
| 14 | June 12, 2013 | Elroy Chester | 43 | 28 | 15 | Male | Black | Texas | Lethal injection | |
| 15 | June 12, 2013 | William Edward Van Poyck | 58 | 32 | 26 | Male | White | Florida | Lethal injection | |
| 16 | June 18, 2013 | James Lewis DeRosa | 36 | 23 | 13 | Male | White | Oklahoma | Lethal injection | |
| 17 | June 25, 2013 | Brian Darrell Davis | 39 | 27 | 12 | Male | Black | Oklahoma | Lethal injection | |
| 18 | June 26, 2013 | Kimberly LaGayle McCarthy | 52 | 36 | 16 | Female | Black | Texas | Lethal injection | |
| 19 | July 16, 2013 | John Manuel Quintanilla Jr. | 36 | 25 | 11 | Male | Hispanic | Texas | Lethal injection | |
| 20 | July 18, 2013 | Vaughn Ross | 41 | 29 | 12 | Male | Black | Texas | Lethal injection | |
| 21 | July 25, 2013 | Andrew Reid Lackey | 29 | 22 | 7 | Male | White | Alabama | Lethal injection | |
| 22 | July 31, 2013 | Douglas Alan Feldman | 55 | 40 | 15 | Male | White | Texas | Lethal injection | |
| 23 | August 5, 2013 | John Errol Ferguson | 65 | 29 | 36 | Male | Black | Florida | Lethal injection | |
| 24 | September 10, 2013 | Anthony Rozelle Banks | 61 | 26 | 35 | Male | Black | Oklahoma | Lethal injection | |
| 25 | September 19, 2013 | Robert Gene Garza | 31 | 21 | 10 | Male | Hispanic | Texas | Lethal injection | |
| 26 | September 25, 2013 | Harry D. Mitts Jr. | 61 | 42 | 19 | Male | White | Ohio | Lethal injection | |
| 27 | September 26, 2013 | Arturo Eleazer Diaz | 37 | 23 | 14 | Male | Hispanic | Texas | Lethal injection | |
| 28 | October 1, 2013 | Marshall Lee Gore | 50 | 24 | 26 | Male | White | Florida | Lethal injection | |
| 29 | October 9, 2013 | Edward Harold Schad Jr. | 71 | 36 | 35 | Male | White | Arizona | Lethal injection | |
| 30 | October 9, 2013 | Michael John Yowell | 43 | 28 | 15 | Male | White | Texas | Lethal injection | |
| 31 | October 15, 2013 | William Frederick Happ | 51 | 24 | 27 | Male | White | Florida | Lethal injection | |
| 32 | October 23, 2013 | Robert Glen Jones Jr. | 43 | 26 | 17 | Male | White | Arizona | Lethal injection | |
| 33 | November 12, 2013 | Darius Mark Kimbrough | 40 | 18 | 22 | Male | Black | Florida | Lethal injection | |
| 34 | November 12, 2013 | Jamie Bruce McCoskey | 49 | 27 | 22 | Male | White | Texas | Lethal injection | |
| 35 | November 20, 2013 | Joseph Paul Franklin | 63 | 27 | 36 | Male | White | Missouri | Lethal injection | |
| 36 | December 3, 2013 | Jerry Duane Martin | 43 | 37 | 6 | Male | White | Texas | Lethal injection | |
| 37 | December 10, 2013 | Ronald Clinton Lott | 53 | 25 | 28 | Male | Black | Oklahoma | Lethal injection | |
| 38 | December 11, 2013 | Allen L. Nicklasson | 41 | 22 | 19 | Male | White | Missouri | Lethal injection | |
| 39 | December 17, 2013 | Johnny Dale Black | 48 | 32 | 16 | Male | White | Oklahoma | Lethal injection | |
| | | Average: | 46 years | 28 years | 18 years | | | | | |

== Demographics ==
Gender
| Male | 38 | 97% |
| Female | 1 | 3% |
Ethnicity
| White | 23 | 59% |
| Black | 13 | 33% |
| Hispanic | 3 | 8% |
State
| Texas | 16 | 38% |
| Florida | 7 | 21% |
| Oklahoma | 6 | 16% |
| Ohio | 3 | 8% |
| Arizona | 2 | 5% |
| Missouri | 2 | 5% |
| Alabama | 1 | 2.5% |
| Georgia | 1 | 2.5% |
| Virginia | 1 | 2.5% |
Method
| Lethal injection | 38 | 97% |
| Electrocution | 1 | 3% |
Month
| January | 1 | 3% |
| February | 2 | 5% |
| March | 2 | 5% |
| April | 4 | 10% |
| May | 4 | 10% |
| June | 5 | 13% |
| July | 4 | 10% |
| August | 1 | 3% |
| September | 4 | 10% |
| October | 5 | 13% |
| November | 3 | 8% |
| December | 4 | 10% |
Age
| 20–29 | 2 | 6% |
| 30–39 | 8 | 21% |
| 40–49 | 15 | 38% |
| 50–59 | 9 | 23% |
| 60–69 | 4 | 10% |
| 70–79 | 1 | 3% |
| Total | 39 | 100% |

== Executions in recent years ==
Number of executions
| 2014 | 35 |
| 2013 | 39 |
| 2012 | 43 |
| Total | 117 |

== See also ==
- Capital punishment in the United States
- List of juveniles executed in the United States since 1976
- List of women executed in the United States since 1976
- List of United States Supreme Court decisions on capital punishment

| Preceded by 2012 | List of people executed in the United States in 2013 | Succeeded by 2014 |
