= Glades Correctional Institution =

Former prison in Florida, United States

Coordinates: 26°43′03″N 80°40′29″W

The Glades Correctional Institution was a Florida Department of Corrections state prison for men in unincorporated Palm Beach County, Florida, near Belle Glade.

The prison opened in 1932 as the Florida Farm #2. In 1951 the state renamed the prison to the Glades State Prison Farm. In 1962 it received its current name.

Glades was closed by the state in 2011. In 2014 the state sold the vacant facility and surrounding property to a private local group which included the former mayor of the town.
