= Murder of Jimmy Ryce =

American murder case

Jimmy Ryce
- Born: Samuel James Ryce; September 26, 1985; Homestead, Florida, U.S.
- Died: September 11, 1995 (aged 9); Redland, Florida, U.S.
- Cause of death: Gunshot wound
- Body discovered: December 9, 1995; Redland, Florida, U.S.

Samuel James "Jimmy" Ryce (September 26, 1985 – September 11, 1995) was a child who was abducted, raped, and killed by Juan Carlos Chavez in Redland, Florida, United States. On Wednesday, February 12, 2014, Chavez was executed at Florida State Prison in Raiford.

== Ryce's murder ==
Juan Carlos Chavez (March 16, 1967 – February 12, 2014) was convicted of Ryce's murder.

Chavez arrived in south Florida on a raft from Cuba with two others in 1991 and was working as a farmhand at the time of the murder. Little is known about his background or family, who remained in Cuba.

On September 11, 1995, nine-year-old Ryce was riding the bus from school. He was dropped off, along with ten classmates, and had to walk less than a block to his home. According to his confession, Chavez blocked Ryce's path with his pickup truck and forced him at gunpoint into the truck. Chavez took Ryce to his trailer on a nearby ranch, where he raped him. About four hours later, when he heard a helicopter hovering above, Ryce ran to the door and tried to open it only to be shot in the back by Chavez, who held the child until he took his last breath. Then, Chavez decapitated and dismembered him.

The child's decapitated and dismembered body was found three months later near Chavez's trailer.

== Capturing Juan Carlos Chavez ==
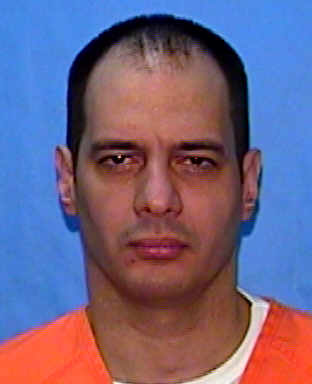
Juan Carlos Chavez was convicted of capital sexual battery, kidnapping, and first degree murder.

Chavez worked for the Scheinhaus family as a handyman. He lived in a trailer on their property. Around the time of Ryce's disappearance, Susan Scheinhaus reported several items missing from her home including a handgun and jewelry. Scheinhaus suspected Chavez after consulting with a psychic, but had no evidence to support her suspicions. Aided by a locksmith, Scheinhaus entered Chavez's trailer. She found her handgun and young Ryce's bookbag. She reported her findings to the Federal Bureau of Investigation on December 5, 1995. Chavez was found a day later and taken in for questioning.

Being advised of his rights and after a 55-hour-long interrogation, Chavez openly admitted to abducting, raping, and murdering Ryce. Chavez also led police to the boy's body, which was dismembered and hidden in concrete in three plastic planters.

=== The murder case ===
In the fall of 1998, Chavez was convicted of kidnapping, sexual battery, and capital murder. He was sentenced to death. The Florida Supreme Court affirmed his conviction and sentence on November 21, 2002. In July 2004, Chavez filed a motion for post-conviction relief, alleging ineffective assistance of counsel. The motion was amended in May 2006, and was heard in Miami-Dade Circuit Court on January 9, 2007. The circuit court judge denied the motion on March 8, 2007. On May 23, 2007, Chavez appealed the denial to the Florida Supreme Court, filing a petition for habeas corpus at the same time. The court affirmed the circuit court's order and denied the petition on June 25, 2009. The United States Supreme Court denied certiorari. On April 17, 2012, Chavez filed a successor motion for post-conviction relief under Florida Rule of Criminal Procedure 3.850. The circuit court denied the motion on June 13, 2012. On July 20, 2012, Chavez appealed the denial to the Florida Supreme Court, which affirmed the denial on October 11, 2013.

On January 2, 2014, Florida Governor Rick Scott signed Chavez's death warrant. Chavez, age 46, was executed by lethal injection on February 12, 2014, at 8:17 p.m. at Florida State Prison in Raiford. Chavez made no final statement but issued a written message in which he wished "unfailing love be upon us, upon me, upon those who today take the life out of this body, as well as those who in their blindness or in their pain desire my death. God bless us all."

== The Jimmy Ryce Act ==
The Jimmy Ryce Act (Jimmy Ryce Involuntary Civil Commitment for Sexually Violent Predators' Treatment And Care Act) was passed unanimously by the Florida legislature and was signed by Governor Lawton Chiles on May 19, 1998, becoming effective on January 1, 1999. The act calls for inmates with sex offense histories to be reviewed by the Florida Department of Corrections, the Florida Department of Children and Families (DCF), and state attorneys to determine the level of risk for re-offense. Upon release from incarceration, these inmates may be subject to civil proceedings and commitment to a secure facility for treatment. That treatment center, located in Arcadia, was criticized because treatment is lacking (less than 5 hours per week), it lacks security (several incidents of murder on site, riots requiring hundreds of officers to quell) there is no method of restoring civil liberties (the program has no release stage) being underfunded, understaffed and located in an old condemned correctional facility. After running the center for 7 years, Liberty Healthcare was released by the state as the vendor, and GEO Group was retained.

In 2004, residents of the Florida Civil Commitment Center (FCCC) in the custody of the Florida Department of Children and Families (DCF) filed a civil rights suit pursuant to 42 U.S.C. § 1983 in U.S. District Court Middle District of Florida, challenging the lack of sex offender and mental health treatment provided at FCCC in Arcadia, Florida. Plaintiffs were all involuntarily civilly confined at FCCC pursuant to the Sexually Violent Predator Act §§ 394.910, et seq. Fla. Stat. (2003). Plaintiffs alleged violations of their constitutional rights and the Americans with Disabilities Act (ADA) by the denial of effective sex offender treatment programs, lack of appropriate mental health care and the failure to accommodate inmates with disabilities. Plaintiffs requested certification as a class action and sought declaratory and injunctive relief. Defendants named in the Complaint were the DCF and the private corporation Liberty Behavioral Healthcare Corp. that operated the FCCC pursuant to a contract with the DCF. The court certified the case as a class action. After Liberty was replaced as the private contractor, it was dismissed from the lawsuit which proceeded against DCF. Over the next several years, the plaintiffs and defendants engaged in intensive discovery and pre-trial litigation. DCF and the new contractor, GEO Group, implemented significant changes in the sex offender and psychiatric treatment provided to residents. In the Fall of 2009, plaintiffs and defendants, through their respective attorneys, filed a joint motion to dismiss the suit in favor of a settlement agreement. Federal Court Justice Steele accepted the joint submission and dismissed the class action suit, with prejudice, in November 2009, the same year that Jimmy Ryce's mother died.

== Jimmy Ryce Center for Victims of Predatory Abduction and Team Hope ==
The family of Ryce created the Jimmy Ryce Center for Victims of Predatory Abduction to offer assistance to law enforcement, including providing free bloodhounds for use in search and rescue. Ryce's mother, Claudine Dianne Ryce, was also a founder of Team Hope, a group of parents of abducted children who support parents and families facing child abduction.

== See also ==
- Amber alert
- Child abduction
- Child murder
- List of kidnappings
- List of murdered American children
- List of people executed in Florida
- List of people executed in the United States in 2014
- List of solved missing person cases: 1950–1999
- Murder of Adam Walsh

Executions carried out in Florida
Preceded by Thomas Otis Knight January 7, 2014	Juan Carlos Chavez; February 12, 2014	Succeeded by Paul Augustus Howell February 26, 2014
Executions carried out in the United States
Preceded by Suzanne Margaret Basso – Texas February 5, 2014	Juan Carlos Chavez – Florida; February 12, 2014	Succeeded by Michael Anthony Taylor – Missouri February 26, 2014
