= Thomas Knight (murderer) =

American serial killer executed in Florida (1951–2014)

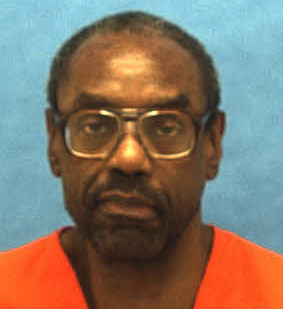

FBI Ten Most Wanted Fugitive
- Charges: First degree murder; Unlawful Flight to Avoid Prosecution
- Alias: Askari Abdullah Muhammad; Edwin Van Williams

Description
- Born: Thomas Otis Knight; February 4, 1951; Fort Pierce, Florida, U.S.
- Died: January 7, 2014 (aged 62); Florida State Prison, Raiford, Florida, U.S.
- Cause of death: Execution by lethal injection
- Gender: Male
- Height: 6 ft 1 in (185 cm)

Status
- Convictions: First degree murder (3 counts)
- Penalty: Death
- Added: December 12, 1974
- Executed: January 7, 2014 (aged 62)
- Number: 328
- Executed

Thomas Otis Knight (February 4, 1951 – January 7, 2014) was an American fugitive and serial killer who was executed in Florida for murder. In 1974, Knight murdered a Miami couple after forcing them to withdraw US$50,000 from a bank. While awaiting trial, Knight and ten other inmates escaped from jail and went on a crime spree, during which he murdered a store clerk in an armed robbery. He was added to the FBI Ten Most Wanted Fugitives list on December 12, 1974, and was captured on December 31, 1974.

Knight was sentenced to death in 1975 for the Miami murders. While on death row, he committed a fourth murder, in which he fatally stabbed a corrections officer. After spending thirty-nine years on death row, Knight was executed on January 7, 2014. Knight was once described as a poster boy for the death penalty and his case has been referenced by supporters of capital punishment.

== Early life ==
Knight was born on February 4, 1951, in Fort Pierce, Florida. He was the second oldest of nine children and came from a family with a history of mental illness. His father was a violent alcoholic who regularly beat his children and once raped Knight's sister in front of him. When Knight was nine, he was arrested for theft multiple times. At age fifteen, he was sent to state prison on a burglary conviction. He was later committed to the Northeast Florida State Hospital in Macclenny at the age of nineteen, where he was diagnosed with drug and poison intoxication and paranoid personality disorder.

== Murders ==
=== Miami murders ===
On July 17, 1974, Knight approached his boss, Sydney Gans, in a parking lot. Armed with a rifle, Knight forced Gans into his car and ordered him to drive to his Miami Beach home and pick up his wife, Lillian Gans. Sydney obeyed Knight's demands and collected his wife. Knight then ordered the couple to drive to a bank in downtown Miami and withdraw US$50,000 in cash. While Sydney went to collect the money, Lillian drove Knight around in the car. Inside the bank, Sydney withdrew the cash, but alerted people inside about the current situation. Staff at the bank called the FBI who then contacted the Miami Police Department. Sydney returned to the car with the money and the three of them drove off, with Miami police tailing the vehicle. The police lost sight of the vehicle momentarily but later found it at a secluded construction area with the doors left open. Police prepared to search the area but quickly spotted Knight, who was armed with the rifle. Knight fled on foot into some trees nearby and escaped. Officers then found the dead bodies of both Lillian and Sydney. Lillian was found dead in the car and Sydney was found dead about 25 feet (7.6 m) away, both had died from gunshot wounds to the neck. Four and a half hours later, Knight was apprehended by the police. He was found with his rifle and the stolen US$50,000.

=== Prison break and manhunt ===
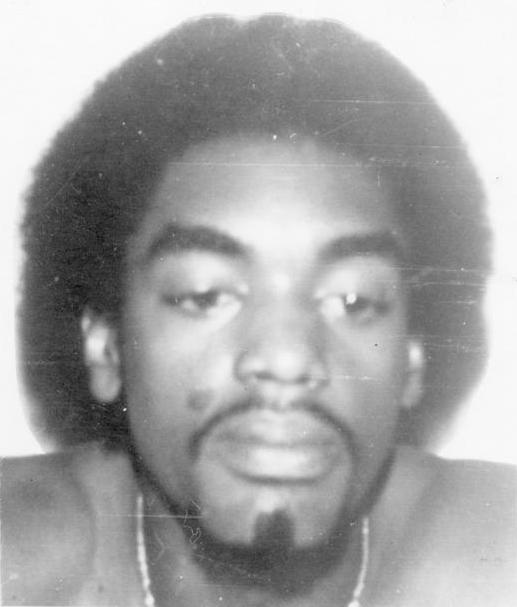
FBI profile image of Thomas Knight

While awaiting trial for the murders of Sydney and Lillian Gans, Knight and ten other prisoners escaped from the Miami-Dade County Jail, on September 19, 1974. Two days later, eight of the eleven escapees were captured, with only Knight and two others remaining at large. While on the run, Knight committed several armed robberies and hold ups. On October 21, 1974, Knight and an accomplice held up a liquor store in Cordele, Georgia. The clerk, William Culpepper, was then shot three times by Knight during the robbery. Culpepper died at the scene and another clerk, A.V. Norton, was shot twice but survived. The pair stole US$640 in the robbery.

On December 12, 1974, Knight was added to the FBI Ten Most Wanted Fugitives list. On December 31, 1974, an FBI SWAT team captured Knight at a rooming house in New Smyrna Beach, Florida. Despite being heavily armed and barricaded behind a door, Knight was overwhelmed by the FBI SWAT team and was arrested. At the time of his capture, Knight had an arsenal of weapons including a sawed-off shotgun, a 9mm automatic, and a .38 caliber revolver, all of which had been stolen from Titusville. Knight was the 328th fugitive to be placed on the FBI's Ten Most Wanted fugitives list and spent nearly three weeks on the list before being captured. Since his escape from jail, he spent just over three months as a fugitive before police apprehended him.

=== Death row murder ===
On April 21, 1975, Knight was sentenced to death for the murders of Sydney and Lillian Gans. On October 12, 1980, while on death row, Knight fatally stabbed state corrections officer Richard Burke with a sharpened spoon at Florida State Prison. The reason Knight killed him was reportedly because the prison would not let him see his mother, who was making her first visit to see him. According to court documents, Knight stabbed Burke as he was escorting him to the prison shower. The prison wanted Knight to shave his full beard off before seeing any visitors which had angered him. On January 20, 1983, Knight was sentenced to death again for the murder of Burke.

== Execution ==
Knight's execution was delayed repeatedly because of multiple appeals and rulings. In 1987, a federal appeals court removed his original death sentence for the murders of Sydney and Lillian Gans because he had not been allowed to have any background witnesses on the stand during his penalty phase. He spent so long on death row that he was nearly granted a stay to hear a claim that it may be ruled unconstitutional to execute an inmate after such a long time on death row. However, the Supreme Court of the United States refused to hear his final appeals.

Knight was executed on January 7, 2014, via lethal injection at Florida State Prison in Raiford, Florida. He was the first person to be executed in the United States in 2014. He spent a total of thirty-nine years on death row until his execution was carried out. His last meal consisted of sweet potato pie, coconut cake, banana nut bread, a quarter bottle of Sprite, two tablespoons of strawberries, butter-pecan ice cream, vanilla ice cream and Fritos corn chips. He declined to make a final statement. While on death row, Knight converted to Islam and changed his name to Askari Abdullah Muhammad.

== See also ==
- Capital punishment in Florida
- Capital punishment in the United States
- FBI Ten Most Wanted Fugitives, 1970s
- List of longest prison sentences served
- List of people executed in Florida
- List of people executed in the United States in 2014
- List of serial killers in the United States

Executions carried out in Florida
Preceded by Darius Mark Kimborough November 12, 2013	Thomas Otis Knight; January 7, 2014	Succeeded by Juan Carlos Chavez February 12, 2014
Executions carried out in the United States
Preceded by Johnny Dale Black – Oklahoma December 17, 2013	Thomas Otis Knight – Florida; January 7, 2014	Succeeded by Michael Lee Wilson – Oklahoma January 9, 2014
