= Gary Ray Bowles =

American serial killer (1962–2019)

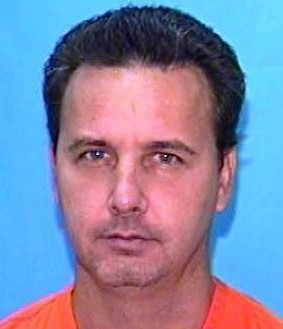
- Born: January 25, 1962; Clifton Forge, Virginia, U.S.
- Died: August 22, 2019 (aged 57); Florida State Prison, Florida, U.S.
- Other name: The I-95 Killer
- Status: Executed by lethal injection
- Convictions: First degree murder (3 counts); Sexual battery Aggravated battery Armed robbery Robbery; Burglary; Grand theft auto Grand theft (2 counts)
- Penalty: Two death sentences (August 1997 & 1999)

Details
- Victims: 6+
- Span of crimes: March – October 1994
- Country: United States
- States: Florida; Georgia; Maryland
- Date apprehended: November 22, 1994

Gary Ray Bowles (January 25, 1962 – August 22, 2019) was an American serial killer who was executed in 2019 for the murders of six men in 1994. He is sometimes referred to as The I-95 Killer since most of his victims lived close to the Interstate 95 highway. He was executed by lethal injection for his crimes in 2019.

== Early life ==
Bowles was born in Clifton Forge, Virginia, and was raised in Rupert, West Virginia. His father Frank, who worked as a coal miner, died from black lung disease six months before Bowles was born, and his mother Frances remarried several times. Bowles was abused by his second stepfather, a violent alcoholic who also abused Bowles' mother and older brother. The abuse continued until, at the age of 13, Bowles fought back and severely injured his stepfather. He left home soon thereafter, angered by his mother's decision to remain in the marriage. He was homeless for the next few years, earning money as a sex worker to men.

In 1982, he was arrested for beating and sexually assaulting his girlfriend, and was sentenced to six years in prison. In 1991, after his release from prison, he was convicted of unarmed robbery in the theft of an elderly woman's purse, a crime for which he was sentenced to four more years in prison; he was released after serving two years.

== Murders ==
On March 15, 1994, in Daytona Beach, Florida, Bowles killed his first known victim, John Hardy Roberts, age 59, who had offered him a temporary place to live. Bowles beat and strangled him to death, and then stole his credit card which he later used in Kingsland, Georgia, and Nashville, Tennessee. Police soon considered him a suspect after finding his fingerprints and probation records at the crime scene.

Over the next six months, Bowles murdered four other men: 39-year-old David Jarman in Wheaton, Maryland, 72-year-old Milton Bradley in Savannah, Georgia, 47-year-old Alverson Carter Jr. in Atlanta, Georgia, and 37-year-old Albert Morris in Hilliard, Florida. His typical modus operandi was to prostitute himself to his victims before beating and strangling them, and stealing their credit cards.

While on the run, Bowles was put on the FBI's list of the country's 10 Most Wanted Fugitives for his four known victims. On November 22, 1994, Bowles was arrested for the murder of Walter Jamelle "Jay" Hinton in Jacksonville Beach, Florida, and confessed to all six murders.

Following his arrest for the murders, Bowles told police that following his 1991 release from prison he had moved to Daytona Beach, and moved in with a girlfriend and resumed working as a prostitute. According to Bowles, his girlfriend became pregnant but then had an abortion after she learned that Bowles was a sex worker. Bowles told police officers that he blamed gay men for the abortion, and this led him to becoming a murderer.

== Aftermath ==
In May 1996, Bowles pleaded guilty to the killing of Walter Jamelle Hinton in Jacksonville on November 17, 1994. Hinton died after Bowles hit his head with a 40-pound (18 kg) stepping stone while Hinton was sleeping and stuffed a towel down his throat during the struggle. Bowles received the death penalty for Hinton's murder. In August 1997, while sitting on death row for the slaying of Hinton, Bowles pleaded guilty to beating and strangling Roberts in 1994.

Bowles was found guilty of three counts of murder and sentenced to death, but the sentence was reversed by the Florida Supreme Court, when they determined that the court erred by allowing the jury to hear that Bowles hated homosexuals and that the victim was gay. He was given a new sentencing hearing, and in 1999 again received the death penalty.

Bowles was executed by lethal injection on August 22, 2019, at Florida State Prison near Raiford. Bowles ate three cheeseburgers, french fries, and bacon as a last meal.

He was the last person executed in Florida until the execution of Donald Dillbeck on February 23, 2023.

== Victims ==
1. March 15, 1994: John Hardy Roberts, age 59
2. April 14, 1994: David Alan Jarman, 39
3. May 4, 1994: Milton Joseph Bradley, 72
4. May 13, 1994: Alverson Carter Jr., 47
5. May 18, 1994: Albert Morris, 37
6. November 16, 1994: Walter "Jay" Hinton, 42

== See also ==
- List of people executed in Florida
- List of people executed in the United States in 2019
- List of serial killers in the United States

Executions carried out in Florida
Preceded by Bobby Joe Long May 23, 2019	Gary Ray Bowles; August 22, 2019	Succeeded by Donald Dillbeck February 23, 2023
Executions carried out in the United States
Preceded by Larry Ray Swearingen – Texas August 21, 2019	Gary Ray Bowles – Florida; August 22, 2019	Succeeded by Billy Jack Crutsinger – Texas September 4, 2019
