= Louis Gaskin =

American murderer (1967–2023)

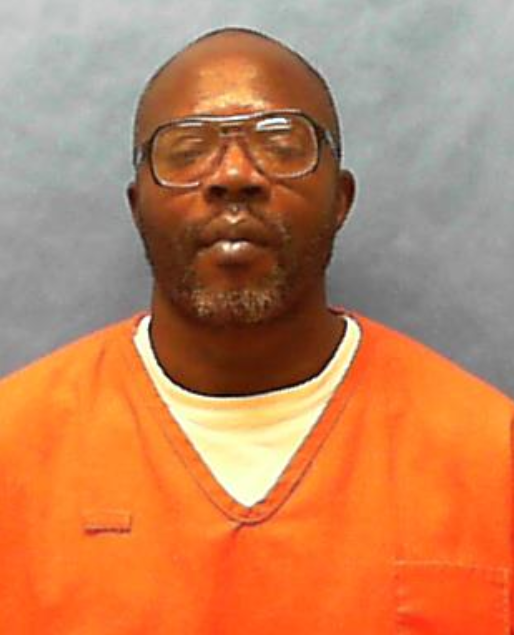
- FDOC mug shot
- Born: Louis Bernard Gaskin; March 11, 1967
- Died: April 12, 2023 (aged 56); Florida State Prison, Raiford, Florida, U.S.
- Cause of death: Execution by lethal injection
- Other name: "The Ninja Killer"
- Convictions: First degree murder (3 counts); Attempted first degree murder (3 counts); Aggravated assault Armed robbery (3 counts); Armed burglary (3 counts); Burglary (2 counts); Possession of a firearm by a convicted felon
- Penalty: Death (June 19, 1990)

Details
- Victims: 3 killed, 1 injured
- Span of crimes: 1986–1989
- Country: United States
- State: Florida
- Date apprehended: December 30, 1989
- Imprisoned at: Florida State Prison

Louis Bernard Gaskin (March 11, 1967 – April 12, 2023) was an American serial killer who was executed in Florida for the 1989 murders of Robert and Georgette Sturmfels in Palm Coast. He was also convicted of the attempted murders of Joseph and Mary Rector, and the murder of Charles Martin Miller in 1986. He was popularly known as the Ninja Killer because he dressed in a full black ninja outfit to avoid identification. He was executed on April 12, 2023, at the age of 56.

== Murders ==
On the night of December 20, 1989, Gaskin walked up to the Palm Coast home (at the time, unincorporated Flagler County) of 56-year-old Robert and 55-year-old Georgette Sturmfels with a .22 caliber rifle and wearing a complete black ninja outfit to avoid identification. Gaskin circled the home to the back window, where Robert was sitting in a recliner, and Georgette sat on the sofa. Gaskin fired his gun, shooting Robert five times, killing him, and shooting Georgette once. Georgette was still alive after the first shot, so Gaskin reloaded his gun and shot Georgette in the head, killing her.

A few hours later, Gaskin drove up to the home of Joseph and Mary Rector. As the Rectors watched television, Gaskin fired his rifle into the home, hitting Joseph. Joseph was able to run out of the room. Mary and Joseph took cover in a closet until they heard Gaskin smash the back window, so they ran out to the car, where Gaskin started firing at them from inside the house. All of the bullets missed, and the Rectors were able to get in their car and drive away to a nearby hospital. The police were called, and after a search of the home, it was clear the perpetrator had ransacked it.

When the murders became public, Gaskin became a suspect almost immediately after his girlfriend's cousin implicated Gaskin in the killings, saying that Gaskin came home soon after the killings and said he was wrapping some "presents."

== Arrest and conviction ==
Gaskin was arrested on December 30. Initially, he denied any involvement in the murders. However, he later confessed to the murders and said the killings were completely random. He confessed in a taped statement to having urges to kill. He also confessed to killing Charles Martin Miller on November 20, 1986. After a search of Gaskin's home, the "presents" were determined to be from the Sturmfels' property. After a two-month trial in July 1990, Gaskin was found guilty of two counts of first-degree murder and two counts of attempted murder, and he was given two death sentences. In 2002, Gaskin unsuccessfully tried to appeal his sentence. He was incarcerated at the Florida State Prison in Raiford, Florida from his arrest up until his execution, 34 years later.

== Execution ==
On March 13, 2023, Governor Ron DeSantis signed Gaskin's death warrant for April 12, 2023. On that day, Gaskin had his last meal, which included barbeque pork ribs, Buffalo wings, turkey neck, shrimp fried rice, French fries, and water. His sister visited him and there was no meeting with a spiritual advisor. He was executed by lethal injection and was pronounced dead at 6:15 p.m. He was 56. None of the relatives of the victims arranged to be in the witness room for the execution.

== See also ==
- List of people executed in Florida
- List of people executed in the United States in 2023
- List of serial killers in the United States

Executions carried out in Florida
Preceded by Donald Dillbeck February 23, 2023	Louis Gaskin; April 12, 2023	Succeeded by Darryl Brian Barwick May 3, 2023
Executions carried out in the United States
Preceded by Arthur Brown Jr. – Texas March 9, 2023	Louis Gaskin – Florida; April 12, 2023	Succeeded by Darryl Brian Barwick – Florida May 3, 2023
