= Donald Dillbeck =

American murderer (1963–2023)

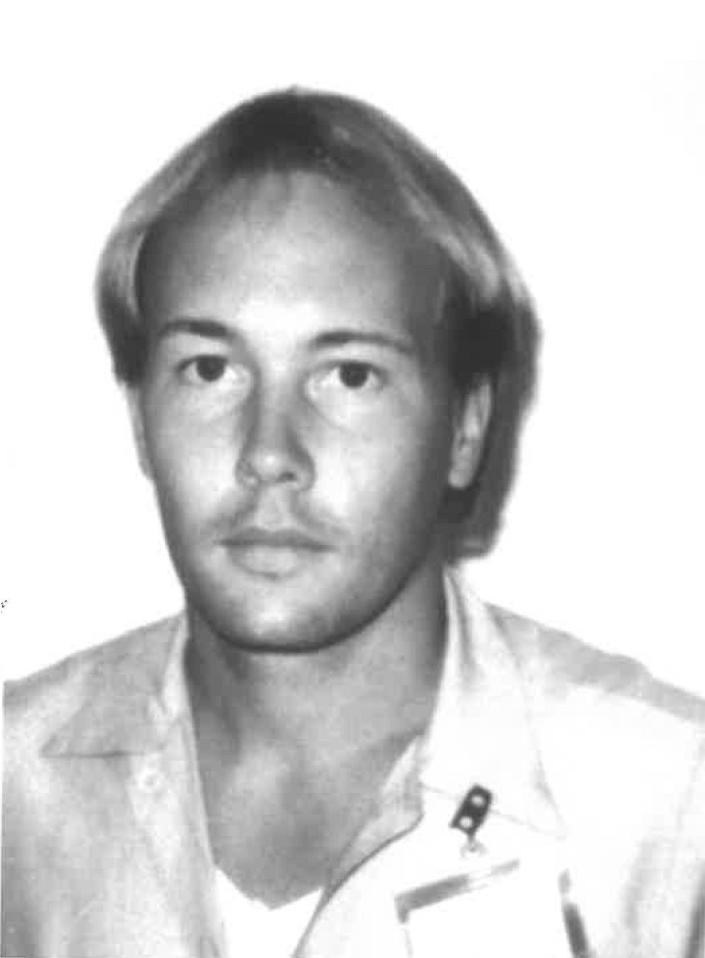
- Born: Donald David Dillbeck; May 24, 1963; El Paso, Texas, U.S.
- Died: February 23, 2023 (aged 59); Florida State Prison, Florida, U.S.
- Status: Executed by lethal injection
- Convictions: First degree murder (2 counts); Armed robbery; Armed burglary; Attempted escape
- Penalty: Life imprisonment (June 6, 1979); Death (March 15, 1991)

Donald David Dillbeck (May 24, 1963 – February 23, 2023) was an American convicted murderer executed by the state of Florida for killing a woman in a Tallahassee mall parking lot in 1990. This crime occurred after his second escape from prison, where he was serving a life sentence for the 1979 murder of a deputy sheriff.

== Life and crimes ==
At age six, Dillbeck's father walked out on him and his alcoholic mother, and he was placed in several foster homes until age 15.

On April 11, 1979, Dillbeck, who was a high school dropout and runaway, was sitting inside a stolen car at a closed park at the beach in Fort Myers Beach, Florida. Someone made a suspicious person complaint about this, and Lee County deputy Dwight Lynn Hall, 31, arrived and questioned him. He ran from the car, so Hall chased and caught him on foot. During a struggle that followed, Dillbeck grabbed Hall's gun and shot him dead. He was arrested and, on June 6, sentenced to life imprisonment.

On February 7, 1983, Dillbeck escaped prison and was recaptured. For this, he was sentenced to one year and one day in prison. He was later given a 25-year mandatory minimum sentence and put in a lower-security facility, where he was disciplined multiple times, including for attempted assault in 1984 and drinking intoxicants in 1985.

On June 22, 1990, Dillbeck was working with other inmates on a catering function at the Quincy vocational center. He walked away and ended up in Tallahassee, where he stole a paring knife. On June 24, he approached a woman named Robbie Faye Vann, 44, in her vehicle in the parking lot of the Tallahassee Mall. With the knife, he attempted to carjack her, and she resisted. He then stabbed her repeatedly, killing her. The vehicle crashed in the lot, and he fled on foot, chased by a mall security guard. First reports to 911 were of a car crash, then a stabbing and foot chase. He was arrested in a nearby backyard soon after, still armed with the knife.

Governor Bob Martinez called for tighter custody of inmates and firing of the corrections officers involved. A 1991 article called the case reminiscent of Willie Horton's 1988 furlough by Michael Dukakis's program.

== Conviction and execution ==
Dillbeck's court-appointed lawyer conceded his crimes and tried to save him from the electric chair.

Dillbeck was convicted of first-degree murder, armed robbery, and armed burglary and was sentenced to death on March 15, 1991. He also got two more consecutive life sentences on top of the one he was already serving. He was sent to death row at the Florida State Prison in Raiford.

At the sentencing, Dillbeck told the judge: "I'm really sorry for what happened. I wish it didn't, not because I'm standing here, but because it happened. I'm asking for a life sentence, not for my sake, but for my parents' sake." His parents said he "had been brain damaged and abused".

On January 23, 2023, Florida Governor Ron DeSantis signed Dillbeck's death warrant, scheduling his execution for February 23. Dillbeck was executed that day at Florida State Prison via lethal injection. He was pronounced dead at 6:13 p.m. EST. Dillbeck's last words were an attack on DeSantis. He said "I know I hurt people when I was young. I really messed up. But I know Ron DeSantis has done a lot worse. He's taken a lot from a lot of people. I speak for all men, women and children. He's put his foot on our necks. Ron DeSantis and other people like him can suck our dicks."

Dillbeck was the first person executed in Florida since the execution of Gary Ray Bowles in 2019 and the 100th execution since the state's reinstatement of the death penalty in 1976.

== See also ==
- List of people executed in Florida
- List of people executed in the United States in 2023

Executions carried out in Florida
Preceded by Gary Ray Bowles August 22, 2019	Donald Dillbeck; February 23, 2023	Succeeded by Louis Gaskin April 12, 2023
Executions carried out in the United States
Preceded by John Lezell Balentine – Texas February 8, 2023	Donald Dillbeck – Florida; February 23, 2023	Succeeded by Gary Green – Texas March 7, 2023
