= James Koedatich =

American serial killer

- Born: James_Jerold_Koedatich; June 12, 1948 (age 78); Morristown, New Jersey, U.S.
- Convictions: Florida; Second degree murder New Jersey; Murder (2 counts); Aggravated sexual assault Aggravated assault (2 counts); Kidnapping
- Penalty: Florida; 15 years imprisonment New Jersey; Death; commuted to life imprisonment

Details
- Victims: 3 (Note: This total does not include Koedatich's cellmate whose death he was not prosecuted for because it was ruled self-defense.)
- Span of crimes: 1971–1982
- Country: United States
- States: Florida; New Jersey
- Date apprehended: January 18, 1983
- Imprisoned at: New Jersey State Prison

James Jerold Koedatich (born June 12, 1948) is an American serial killer who kidnapped and murdered two young women within a two-week span in Morris County, New Jersey, in late 1982. Following his arrest, he was tried, convicted, and sentenced to death, but was resentenced to life in prison in 1990. Prior to the murders, Koedatich murdered his roommate in Florida, for which he served eleven years in prison, and while in prison he killed his cellmate, but that was ruled to be self-defense.

== Early life ==
Koedatich was born in Morristown, New Jersey, in 1948, the son of Julia and John Koedatich, and was raised alongside brothers John Jr., Michael, and Jeffrey. Their father, John, was alleged to have been very abusive and would regularly beat, kick, and slap his wife. In 1956, after Julia was hospitalized, John Sr. left the family and began a relationship with another woman. Afterwards, Julia raised their children by herself and worked three jobs. She eventually began a relationship with a man named David Baldwin.

As for James Koedatich, he was detained in 1967 at age 19 for unlawfully using a dangerous weapon and sentenced to serve a year in prison. After his release he was arrested several more times for petty crimes before moving to Florida in 1971.

== Murders ==
While in Florida, Koedatich shared an apartment with 40-year-old Robert J. Anderson in Surfside. On June 7, Koedatich was arrested for armed robbery, and while awaiting trial, he managed to escape the county jail. On June 13, Koedatich strangled Anderson to death and hid his body in a closet. He was later arrested and convicted of second-degree murder, serving 11 years in the Florida State Prison in Raiford.

On September 4, 1973, during his prison term, Koedatich fatally stabbed fellow inmate Jerry Kent Barber, who was serving twelve years for kidnapping. Barber's death was ruled to have been self-defense on Koedatich's part; thus, he was not charged. In 1982, having spent eleven years in prison, the Florida Parole Board granted him parole, and in August he was officially released from prison. After his release he moved back to Morristown.

On November 23, 1982, Koedatich came across 18-year-old Amie Hoffman. Hoffman, a cheerleader for Parsippany Hills High School, was leaving her job at a mall in Hanover Township, when Koedatich abducted her and threw her into his vehicle. Once in a secluded location, he sexually assaulted Hoffman before stabbing her to death and disposing of her body in the Mendham Reservoir in Randolph Township. Her body was transported by the naturally moving water into a water holding tank, where it would be found two days later. During the subsequent autopsy, semen belonging to Hoffman's killer was discovered on her body. Eyewitnesses found during the investigation gave a description of the vehicle that the suspect drove. Police also located tire tracks the killer's car left behind.

On December 5, 1982, Koedatich abducted another woman, 25-year-old Deirdre O'Brien, at knifepoint after running her off the road. Once at an Interstate 80 rest area, he raped and stabbed her repeatedly before leaving the area. O'Brien was found alive on the side of the road by a truck driver and was rushed to a hospital, where she died.

== Arrest ==
In January 1983, Koedatich brought himself to the investigators' attention after dialing 911 and claiming he was stabbed by a woman while driving alone at night. As part of regular police procedure, they questioned him about the attack. Detectives noticed that Koedatich's car matched the description of the car seen abducting Hoffman; in addition, his tires' treads matched those found at the scene. Thinking it could be a coincidence, they inspected Koedatich's wounds. Disturbingly, it was found that the wounds were self-inflicted. Koedatich claimed that he had merely been driving around the area where Hoffman was abducted the night of her murder. The following day, police named Koedatich as a suspect in the cases and obtained a search warrant for the vehicle. Clothing fibers belonging to Hoffman and O’Brien were recovered from the car.

== Trials and imprisonment ==
Both trials for Koedatich ended in guilty verdicts despite his claims of innocence. He was sentenced to death, and transferred to New Jersey's death row. However, in 1990, Koedatich's case was brought forward by the Supreme Court of New Jersey, which overturned his original sentence, and he was resentenced to life imprisonment. In 2011, Koedatich contacted the New Jersey Department of Corrections, requesting relocation to a prison in Illinois to be closer to his family; however, Commissioner Gary Lanigan rejected the proposal. In 2017, Koedatich communicated with the Innocence Project, requesting that newly discovered DNA evidence be analysed to possibly clear his name. His latest parole date is set for 2038 when he is 90 years old.

== In media ==
Koedatich's crimes are featured in the episode "Fatal Error" on the television show The New Detectives. In 2022, the case was featured in an episode of Canadian TV show Finally Caught titled "Hoffman-O’Brien".

Crimes are also featured on the TV show ‘’Paranormal Witness’’ S3 E14 “Through the Eyes of a Killer”. Told from the perspectives of some of the lead detectives on the case and psychic Nancy Weber.

Crimes are also featured on the Netflix Series, "Murder Under Friday Night Lights". S2 E2. The episode tells the story through interviews, archival footage, and firsthand accounts from those closest to the case, blending true crime storytelling with the culture of small-town football.

== See also ==
- List of serial killers in the United States
