= Jeffrey Feltner =

American serial killer

- Born: Jeffrey Lynn Feltner; November 21, 1962; Miami, Florida, U.S.
- Died: March 17, 1993 (aged 30); Florida State Prison, Florida, U.S.
- Conviction: First degree murder (2 counts)
- Penalty: Life imprisonment

Details
- Victims: 7
- Span of crimes: 1988–1989
- Country: United States
- State: Florida
- Date apprehended: August 10, 1989

Jeffrey Lynn Feltner (November 21, 1962 – March 17, 1993) was an American serial killer and former nurse's aide who smothered seven patients to death from 1988 to 1989 at the hospitals he worked at. After initially confessing but later recanting his statements, he pleaded guilty to two of the murders in exchange for a 25-to-life sentence and no further charges in the other murders. A few years after his conviction, he died behind bars from AIDS complications.

== Early life ==
Jeffrey Lynn Feltner was born on November 21, 1962, in Miami, Florida. His parents split up three months before his birth, with his father Kasper moving to Michigan while Feltner remained with his mother, Shirley. The pair moved to Melrose in 1979, where Feltner attended and later graduated from the Interlachen High School. Considered a loner by most of his peers, he started spending a majority of his time visiting gay bars and similar establishments around the area. During one sexual encounter, he contracted HIV, which progressively worsened over time.

In 1986, Feltner's mother helped him get a job at the New Life Acres nursing home in Melrose, where she worked as a nursing assistant. After only a few months on the job, he was promoted to supervising other nurses' aides and was greatly respected by both patients and staff. In 1987, Feltner temporarily quit his job for two months so he could locate his birth father, and after succeeding in doing so, he returned to Melrose and was rehired.

== Murders ==
From February to April 1988, five patients died at the New Life Acres nursing home under what were assumed to be natural circumstances. In July of that same year, Feltner anonymously contacted a crisis hotline and confessed to the five killings, claiming that he had an uncontrollable impulse to end their suffering and would probably kill again. These victims were the following:

- Bernie "Berniece" Katherine Olsen, 69 - retired schoolteacher who had moved to Florida to be closer to her sister. Died on February 7, in what was thought to be the result of Alzheimer's disease.
- Lathan Thornton, 82 - retired U.S. Navy veteran from Gainesville. Died on February 8.
- Sarah F. Abrams, 75 - died on February 10. At the time of her death, family members noticed suspicious bruises around her nose and mouth and requested an autopsy, but their request was dismissed by coroners who thought that the death was the result of a heart attack. In contrast to Feltner's later claims, she was neither bedridden nor suicidal, and her only notable issues were due to old age.
- Rita May Sugrue, 63 - died on February 18.
- William H. James, 73 - retired war veteran from Jacksonville. Died on April 6, having been suffocated by Feltner.

Despite these confessions and Feltner being questioned by police, no charges were brought due to a lack of evidence. In the midst of the investigation, Feltner called anonymously again and claimed he had attempted to kill another patient, but his claims were found to be contradictory and he was dismissed as a crank. In order to prevent him from repeating this, he was charged and found guilty of making harassing phone calls, trespassing and filing a false report, receiving a four-month sentence at a local prison.

After his release on November 19, Feltner moved to Daytona Beach, where he lived in an apartment above a bar on Main Street. He soon found work at the Clyatt Memorial Center, where he was again hired as a supervisor for the nurse's aides. On July 11, 1989, 83-year-old Doris Moriarty, a longtime resident of the center, died suddenly. Her death was not considered suspicious at the time, as she had been in ill health for the past few years. A few days later, Feltner was fired for failing to show up at work, but soon found employment at the Bowman's Nursing Home in Ormond Beach. On July 27, a patient living in the nursing home, 81-year-old Ruby P. Swisher, died in what was originally considered a natural death.

== Arrest, trial and death ==
On August 9, Feltner suffered a mental breakdown and sought help from a mental health centre before calling the offices of the local WESH TV station and confessing to his crimes. A day later, the administrator of the Clyatt Memorial Center, William Powell, called the police and informed them that a former employee of his had supposedly confessed to killing several patients at the places he worked at, which included Moriarty. The authorities soon arrested and charged Feltner with her murder. During subsequent interrogations, he openly admitted to the crimes, exclaiming that he had done them to put his victims out of their misery. In the aftermath of this, the bodies of Abrams, Thornton and James were exhumed for testing, as the other victims' bodies had been cremated.

Soon after his arrest, he was charged with the killings and put on trial for them in January 1990. To the investigators' surprise, Feltner recanted his testimony and claimed that he falsely confessed to the killings in order to bring attention to the appalling conditions and abuse that occurred at the nursing homes. This statement was supported by his parents, who voiced their belief that their son would never commit such a horrendous crime.

While he continued to deny the murder charges, Feltner nonetheless pleaded guilty to two of the murders in order to avoid a potential death sentence. As part of the plea bargain, he would not be charged with the remaining murders and would serve a 25-years-to-life sentence at the Florida State Prison in Raiford. His mother later claimed that the sole reason he confessed was that his life could end quickly, as Feltner's AIDS had been getting progressively worse despite treatment with Aztreonam. As a result of this, he died on March 17, 1993.

== See also ==
- List of serial killers in the United States

== Bibliography ==
- Rose Mandelsberg (November 16, 1993). Medical Murderers: From the Files of True Detective Magazine. Zebra – Kensington. ISBN 1558175822.
- Katherine Ramsland (August 30, 2007). Inside the Minds of Healthcare Serial Killers: Why They Kill. Praeger. ISBN 978-0275994228.
- James Alan Fox, Jack Levin and Kenna Quinet (April 30, 2018). The Will To Kill: Making Sense of Senseless Murder. Sage Publications. ISBN 978-1506365961.
