= James Blake (pianist) =

British-American pianist and writer

- Born: 1922; Edinburgh, Scotland
- Died: February 20, 1979 (aged 56–57); Arlington, Virginia
- Occupations: Musician, criminal, writer
- Notable work: The Joint: Letters from Prison

James Blake (1922 – February 20, 1979) was a jazz musician and petty thief who became a literary sensation in the 1950s when he published his letters in the Paris Review.

== Early life ==
James Blake was born in Edinburgh, Scotland, and moved with the family to the United States in 1929, at age 7. He grew up in Chicago and studied to be a concert pianist.

He attended the University of Illinois Urbana-Champaign and Northwestern University.

== Career ==
Blake left college and became the accompanist for Anita O'Day, a jazz singer, and for Lord Buckley, a comedian. He also played for Bud Freeman, Stuff Smith, June Christie and Chris Connor.

In the 1950s Blake, up until that time a petty thief ("the world's most inept burglar"), became a literary sensation when he published his letters in the Paris Review. Blake, who was gay, was a kept man of a Charleston, South Carolina, aristocrat, whose name Blake did not reveal in his letters. In 1971, he published them in The joint: Letters from Prison. A section of The Joint and a short story, The Widow, Bereft, appeared in Esquire Magazine and the short story was selected by Martha Foley and Whit Burnett and included in Best American Short Stories of 1971.

He also corresponded with Alexander Jensen Yow, painter and later paper conservator at the Morgan Library & Museum. He was also a later companion to Lincoln Kirstein and friend of George Platt Lynes. Yow contacted Blake to compliment his Paris Review letters. At first Blake is replying from an island off South Carolina and discussed his writing, jazz piano playing, and love affairs. The last letters are written from Duval County Jail, in Florida, where Blake was awaiting trial for charges of "breaking and entry and grand larceny"; in these letters he includes descriptions of prison life, and a defense of homosexual love. According to William Styron of The New York Times Book Review, for him prison "was far less a purgatory than a retreat, a kind of timeless, walled Yaddo for the gifted misfit."

== Personal life ==
In 1953, at 31 years old, he received a two-year sentence in the Duval County Jail in Jacksonville, Florida, for "petit larceny and breaking and entering". He was later incarcerated again in Jacksonville and also at "The Joint", the Florida State Penitentiary at Raiford, Florida, spending 13 of the next 20 years in prison.

He died on February 20, 1979, in Arlington, Virginia.
