= Christopher Lunz =

American serial killer

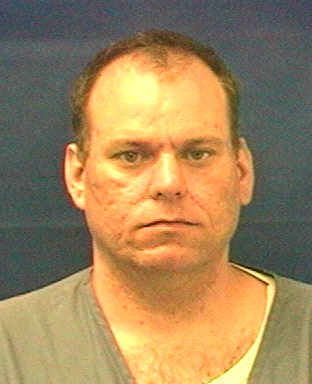
- Born: Christopher David Lunz; September 26, 1967; New York, U.S.
- Died: September 22, 2009 (aged 41); Florida State Prison, Raiford, Florida, U.S.
- Cause of death: Suicide
- Conviction: First degree murder
- Penalty: Life imprisonment

Details
- Victims: 3
- Span of crimes: 2003 – 2009 (confirmed)
- Country: United States
- States: North Carolina; Florida
- Date apprehended: December 2005

Christopher David Lunz (September 26, 1967 – September 22, 2009) was an American serial killer. Convicted and sentenced to life for murdering his father in Palm Harbor, Florida, in 2003, he is best known for being a self-admitted serial killer of pedophiles and sex offenders.

Considered to be responsible for the murder of a fugitive sex offender in North Carolina, Lunz died by suicide after killing a cellmate.

== Early life ==
Little background information is available about Lunz's early life. Born on September 26, 1967, in New York, he was one of two children born to David James Lunz and Laura A. Lunz. At his later trial, Christopher would claim that his father sexually abused him and frequently beat his mother, due to which he developed a seething hatred for pedophiles. However, these claims were never corroborated, and whether they are truthful remains unknown.

As an adult, he developed an addiction to crack cocaine and was arrested for auto theft in New Jersey, for which he served three years imprisonment. According to his own confessions, Lunz claimed that he had almost molested a young boy and several teenage girls, but had restrained himself, apparently taking pride in that fact. In 1999, he moved to Sylva, North Carolina.

=== Meeting William Westerman ===
While living in Sylva, Lunz became acquainted with 23-year-old William Timothy Eugene Westerman, a waiter who worked at a Huddle House in Dillsboro. He allowed Westerman to live at his home, with the younger viewing Lunz as a sort of "father figure".

In early 2003, Lunz's mother died, due to which all of the family's wealth - amounting to $394,494 - was passed onto his father. Upon learning of this, Lunz began concocting a plan to kill his father so he could inherit the money.

== Patricide ==
On March 8, 2003, Christopher and Westerman traveled to David Lunz's home in Palm Harbor, Florida. After exchanging some pleasantries, Christopher said that he had a present for him and went to the kitchen, where he took a sawed-off shotgun out of a backpack. He then assaulted his father, hitting him in the head with the butt of the gun. Christopher then tossed the gun to Westerman and ordered him to shoot David.

Westerman complied, taking a pillow to soften the noise from the shotgun's muzzle, whereupon he shot and killed David at point-blank range. The shotgun recoiled and hit him in the forehead, leaving a noticeable bruise. The pair then stole several items from the house, including a Smith & Wesson .38/44 revolver and a gold Fendi watch. Christopher later gave the watch as a gift to Westerman for completing his GED, and the revolver was thrown into the Cedar Cliff Lake.

=== Investigation, arrest, trial ===
David Lunz's murder went unsolved until October 2005, when the stolen revolver washed up on the banks of the Cedar Cliff Lake. Upon examining the serial number, Jackson County officials realized that it had been stolen from a murder scene and sent it for analysis. Forensic evidence linked the firearm to Westerman, and he was subsequently arrested. He subsequently implicated Christopher as the mastermind behind the killing, and agreed to testify against him in exchange for a lesser sentence of 30 years in prison for second degree murder.

At trial, Westerman testified that he had not been notified in advance that they were going to kill David. Christopher, who acted as his own attorney, dismissed every single part of Westerman's testimony and denied that he was after his father's inheritance. These claims were refuted by witnesses and attorney Beth Wilson, who provided evidence that he had repeatedly inquired about it following his father's murder and was very aggravated when he learned that he would be ineligible to obtain it. During cross-examinations, Christopher resorted to slandering his accomplice, calling him a deadbeat dad and drug addict who impregnated teenage girls.

In spite of his attempts to discredit the witnesses and convince the jury that he was innocent, Christopher Lunz was found guilty on all counts, showing no emotion while the guilty verdict was read out. During the penalty phase, the case took a bizarre turn when Christopher went on a 45-minute long rant, proclaiming himself to be a serial killer of pedophiles, that the voices in his head voted that he was innocent in a 3-to-1 vote and demanding that the jurors impose the death penalty on him. Despite his pleas, the jury voted in favor of a life term - when he heard the verdict, Christopher only shook his head and appeared to mumble something under his breath.

== Incarceration ==
=== Confessions ===
Following his conviction, Lunz was transferred to the Franklin Correctional Institution in Carrabelle to serve out his life term. While in there, he sent a written letter to the police department in Macon County, North Carolina in which he confessed to killing a man named Gerald Michael Estes. Estes was a fugitive charged with molesting two little boys in Franklin in 2003, and was additionally suspected of sexually abusing numerous other minors and his own dog. According to the letter, Lunz and an unnamed accomplice picked up Estes a week after he posted bail, then drove to an isolated location where they tortured and murdered him.

Although he did not provide the body's location or indicated that there was any physical evidence tying him to the crime, Macon County investigators considered his claims to be credible and attempted to arrange an interview with Lunz.

=== Murder-suicide ===
On September 21, 2009, Lunz threatened another inmate with a shank and held him hostage. Prison guards eventually convinced him to calm down, and when they entered his cell, they noticed that his 46-year-old cellmate, a convicted child molester named Nathaniel Taylor, had been stabbed to death. Following this discovery, Lunz was transferred to the Florida State Prison in Raiford.

Roughly 30 hours after this incident, Lunz died by suicide inside his holding cell at the Florida State Prison.

== See also ==
- List of serial killers in the United States
