= Stanley Rice =

American serial killer and sex offender

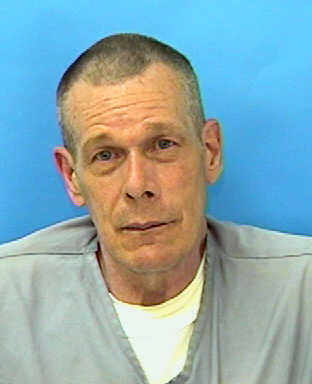
- Born: Stanley Everett Rice; August 7, 1942; Concord, Massachusetts, U.S.
- Died: November 3, 2007 (aged 65); Florida State Prison, Raiford, Florida, U.S.
- Conviction: Murder
- Penalty: Life imprisonment

Details
- Victims: 3–5+
- Span of crimes: 1963–1968
- Country: Canada, United States
- States: Ontario, Ohio, Florida
- Date apprehended: May 25, 1968

Stanley Everett Rice (August 7, 1942 – November 3, 2007) was an American serial killer and child rapist who was responsible for sexually abusing numerous underage boys in Canada and the U.S. during the 1960s, of which he killed at least three. Tried and convicted for one murder committed in Florida, he was sentenced to life imprisonment and remained incarcerated until his death in 2007.

== Early life and crimes ==
Stanley Everett Rice was born on August 7, 1942, in Concord, Massachusetts, the younger of two children. He was raised in a dysfunctional home with abusive parents, but was nonetheless close to his elder sister. According to acquaintances, Rice was considered a nervous, quiet boy who was very polite to those around him, and who stuttered when he was under pressure or excited. He started to exhibit antisocial behavior at the age of five, when he started burning newspapers in the family cellar. Just a month after this incident, Rice proceeded to light a fire under an oil tank in that same cellar. He also stole from family members.

In an attempt to cure him of his apparent fear of loud noises, Rice's father started firing guns in his presence, which seemingly helped the boy overcome his phobia. Not long after, Rice developed a fascination with firearms, and would start stealing ammunition from shops to fire it. At the same time, he continued to commit various acts of vandalism and theft, receiving his first court date at age 11 for stealing ammunition, for which he was put on probation. In February 1955, he was kicked out of a private school in Staatsburg, New York, for vandalism. In 1959, he was convicted of stealing an automobile and detained at a juvenile correctional facility for six months.

According to later interviews, Rice's first sexual experience occurred at age nine, when he was molested by an older man at a barn near a railroad crossing. In the summer of 1955, while at the Lyman School for Boys, he wrote in his diary that he was forced to engage in sexual acts with other boys. Over the next few years, he started developing a sexual fascination with blood and seeing young boys defecate, but he restrained himself from inflicting harm on others. He would write about his sexual fantasies and urges in his personal diary, which he had kept since he was a young boy.

In March 1957, Rice and his parents moved to Nichol Township, a small township near the Kitchener-Waterloo area of Ontario, Canada, where he attended the Kitchener-Waterloo Collegiate and Vocational School. During his period, he developed a fascination with rockets and bombs, and would continue to get in trouble with law enforcement. In one of his prison stints, Rice wrote that he had convinced a fellow inmate to hang himself by claiming that a friend of his was planning to kill him. After his release on November 28, 1961, he would avoid trouble with the police most of the time, but he also began to sexually abuse young boys.

== Murders ==
=== Keith Henry ===
On July 12, 1963, nine-year-old Keith Henry was reported missing from his home in Waterloo, Ontario. His disappearance led to a large-scale investigation of the nearby area by both local authorities and volunteers, but the searches turned up nothing. The searches were eventually discontinued, and a $1,000 reward was announced for anyone who could provide information about his whereabouts. Henry's mother even requested help from purported clairvoyants, but the boy's body was never found.

Rice would write in his diary that he came across Henry while he was fishing, and that he stabbed him to death using a hunting knife, appearing seemingly aroused by the sight of the blood splatters. He then buried the body in an overgrown area on the riverbank of the Grand River, but was unable to remember where exactly. Later that September, Rice was arrested after abducting a young boy and driving him to Swansea, Illinois, but the Canadian authorities agreed to have the charges dropped if he and his family left the country. After doing so, he moved to Sandusky, Ohio, where he found a job at an amusement park.

=== Incarceration and release ===
After working at the park for some time, Rice gathered enough money to buy himself a car and go on a trip across the country before returning to his family's new home in Auburndale, Massachusetts. Just eleven days later, on September 29, he was arrested for having unlicensed weaponry in his car and detained at the Metropolitan State Hospital. During his stay, he was diagnosed as a schizophrenic with a sociopathic personality, but was reported to be a cooperative patient who did not pester the employees. After serving a six-month sentence at the Billerica House of Corrections, he was released and continued to travel cross-country.

=== Tim Trask ===
On June 10, 1966, 8-year-old Tim 'Timmy' Trask left his home in Findlay, Ohio, and hopped on his bike, intent on going fishing near the Blanchard River. Along the way, he came across Rice, who offered to accompany him. When they were left alone, Rice proceeded to beat and then rape Trask, before stabbing him twice and shooting him once in the chest with a 32-caliber pistol. He then covered the body with a pile of wood and left the area.

Trask's body was found on the following day by a man who had been part of a volunteer search party. The discovery shocked the residents of the town, who had never experienced such a brutal killing before. Less than two weeks later, searchers combing the area found a tackle box that did not belong to Trask, which was sent to a laboratory in an attempt to extract fingerprints. In the meantime, The Courier and WFIN offered a $11,000 prize to anyone who could provide information leading to the killer's arrest.

Approximately a month later, Rice was apparently questioned by authorities over the boy's murder, but they failed to locate any evidence linking him to the crime. Despite this, Rice soon left the state and returned to Concord. In January 1968, he was arrested for forcing two young boys to undress at gunpoint and sexually abusing them. Disturbed by the claims, authorities ordered that Rice be held temporarily at the Metropolitan State Hospital for a psychological evaluation, but he managed to escape on February 16, fleeing to Hollywood, Florida.

=== Nelson Williams ===
After arriving in Florida, Rice quickly befriended 59-year-old Leslie Dean, the owner of an automobile salvage yard. In exchange for hiring him as a night watchman, Rice was allowed to sleep in an old Mister Softee ice cream truck, and later found employment at a local car wash. Dean, who was unaware that Rice was a fugitive from the law, described his new acquaintance as an intelligent and honest young man who loved to hang out with his two sons and show them photographs he had taken during his travels cross-country.

On May 12, 1968, Rice finished work at the car wash and then traveled to a pond in rural Broward County, where he knew young boys loved to gather. There he found 11-year-old Lowell 'Nelson' Williams and 10-year-old Kevin Polittle, who were out fishing together. Rice then approached and chatted with them for some time before offering to take them someplace else, but the boys refused. Angered by their refusal, Rice took out a sawed-off shotgun and fired upon them, wounding both. He then took out his knife and went to Williams, whom he proceeded to stab three times, killing him.

Before he could kill Polittle, however, two teenage boys approached them and saw Rice holding a bloodstained knife. He failed to convince them that this was all a misunderstanding, and after picking up the murder weapons, he immediately fled. The two teenagers and Polittle later gave a description of the killer to local authorities, taking special note of his prominent stutter.

== Arrest, trial, and imprisonment ==
On May 25, Rice was arrested for speeding in Broward County by two sheriff's deputies. One of the men noticed that he resembled the facial composite of Williams' supposed killer and also had a stutter, which led them to arrest him. Upon searching his car, the deputies found the sawed-off shotgun and his camera, which contained photographs of naked underage boys. After talking to witnesses, they conclusively confirmed that Rice was at the pond on the day of the murder. During questioning, Rice confessed to killing Williams, but also disclosed that he had killed four other boys in Ontario and Ohio. In addition to that, he revealed that he had a hidden stash of pornographic photos and weapons in a barn near his hometown, and upon inspecting it, Concord police officers were able to verify his claims.

After pleading guilty on the traffic violation charges, Rice was charged with murder in all three cases, but it was decided that prosecutors in Florida would be the first to try him. A few days after his trial began, Rice's attorney filed a motion attempting to declare that his client was incompetent to stand trial, claiming that he suffered from a form of schizophrenia that would deteriorate over time. This was denied by the presiding judge after three court-appointed psychiatrists ruled that while he was emotionally stunted, Rice was fully aware of the gravity of his actions and himself stated that he was sane.

Rice pleaded guilty, and was sentenced to life in prison. Due to his sentence, he was never put on trial for the murders of Henry or Trask, although he has acknowledged responsibility for his crimes. His two other purported victims were never identified.

== Death and aftermath ==
After his conviction, Rice was transferred to the Florida State Prison in Raiford, where he remained until his death on November 3, 2007. A year after his conviction, Rice gave an interview in which he frankly discussed his life, sexual proclivities and his apparent desire to have his pedophilia cured.

== See also ==
- List of serial rapists
- List of serial killers in the United States
