= George Trepal =

American convicted murderer (1949–2026)

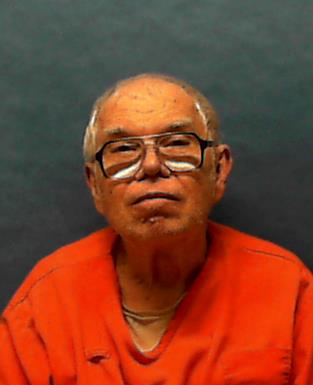
- Mug shot of Trepal
- Born: George James Trepal; January 23, 1949; New York City, New York, U.S.
- Died: November 19, 2026 (aged 77); Raiford, Florida, U.S.
- Status: Deceased
- Motive: Disputes with neighbors
- Convictions: First degree murder (1 count); Attempted first-degree murder (6 counts); Poisoning food or water (7 counts); Tampering with a consumer product (1 count)
- Penalty: Death (March 6, 1991)

Details
- Victims: Peggy Carr, 41
- Date: October 15, 1988 – March 3, 1989
- Country: United States
- Locations: Alturas, Florida, U.S.
- Weapon: Thallium(I) nitrate (poison)
- Imprisoned at: Florida State Prison

George James Trepal (January 23, 1949 – November 19, 2026) was an American chemist and computer programmer, who was convicted in February 1991 of murdering his neighbor, Peggy Jean Carr (August 29, 1947 – March 3, 1989), and attempting to murder her family. He was convicted of poisoning the Carr family, who lived in Alturas, Florida, by adding thallium to multiple bottles of Coca-Cola. All but Peggy Carr survived. Six of Carr's family members were subjected to poisoning, among them were her husband Parearlyn "Pye" Carr, their children, Travis, Duane and Gelena and grandchild Kasey. Travis and Duane were hospitalized as a result of the poisonings. Trepal was sentenced to death by circuit judge Dennis Maloney.

Detective Susan Goreck went undercover to befriend the Trepal couple during a Murder Mystery weekend they organised soon after the incident, with poisoning as the theme. The couple relocated to Sebring, Florida, after which Goreck arranged to rent their Alturas property from them to facilitate the technical team's entry. This led to the discovery of numerous chemicals and empty bottles with traces of thallium residue.

As of 2011, Trepal had continued to deny any involvement in Carr's death.

After his conviction, Trepal filed numerous appeals, all of which were denied. The last was his appeal of his conviction, which he filed with the United States Court of Appeals for the Eleventh Circuit. It was denied in 2012. He was held on death row for more than 30 years at Union Correctional Institution in Raiford, Florida. Trepal died in prison at age 77 on November 19, 2026.

== See also ==
- List of death row inmates in the United States
