= John Ruthell Henry =

Executed American serial killer

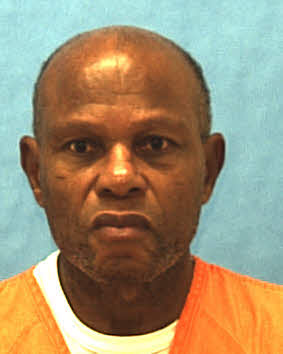
- Born: January 16, 1951; Zephyrhills, Florida, U.S.
- Died: June 18, 2014 (aged 63); Florida State Prison, Florida, U.S.
- Status: Executed by lethal injection
- Convictions: First degree murder (2 counts); Second degree murder
- Penalty: 15 years imprisonment (Roddy); Death (Suzanne and Christian)

Details
- Victims: 3
- Span of crimes: 1975–1985
- Country: United States
- State: Florida
- Date apprehended: December 24, 1985

John Ruthell Henry (January 16, 1951 – June 18, 2014) was an American serial killer who was convicted for the 1985 murder of his second wife and stepson in Florida, a few years after being paroled for the 1975 murder of his first wife. After he was sentenced to death in three separate trials, Henry was executed for the latter murders at the Florida State Prison in 2014.

== Murders ==
In August 1975, Henry, his 28-year-old common law wife Patricia Roddy, and her two daughters, two and three at the time, were driving around in Dade City. During an argument, Henry stopped the car in a parking lot and stabbed Roddy to death. After the killing, he fled towards a wooded area in Zephyrhills, where he was tracked down and arrested by a sheriff's deputy named Fay Wilber. Medical examiner Joan Wood testified that Roddy had been stabbed around 30 times, mostly in the neck and upper body. Henry pleaded no contest to second degree murder and received a 15-year prison sentence with a chance of parole.

In January 1983, Henry was paroled after serving 7 1/2 years of his murder conviction. After his release, he married 28-year-old convenience store clerk Suzanne Overstreet, a divorced Zephyrhills woman with a 4-year-old son named Eugene "Buggy" Christian. The couple's marriage proved unstable, with both of them being arrested on multiple occasions for possessing and selling drugs. Henry had numerous convictions for firearms offenses. By August 1984, Suzanne had gone to a women's shelter, citing her fear that her husband would harm both her and her son, and reportedly sought to have a restraining order issued against him. On December 22, 1985, Henry went to her apartment to ask whether he could buy any Christmas gifts for Christian. Suzanne allowed him inside, but then the pair began to argue. Henry later said that the two fought over a knife before he stabbed Suzanne 13 times. While she lay dying on the ground, Henry supposedly sat down and watched while smoking a cigarette. After wrapping her body in a rug, Henry stole a car and took Christian to a pasture near Thonotosassa, where he stabbed him to death behind a chicken farm.

== Arrest, trials and imprisonment ==
On the following day, Suzanne Henry's body was discovered by her sisters after she had not gone to work in the morning. The authorities questioned neighbors who indicated that they had seen her husband John leave the apartment, accompanied by her son Christian. Authorities learned that he had registered at the local Twilight Motel with another woman. Detective Fay Wilber, the same deputy who had caught Henry a decade prior, immediately recognized him, and after reading his Miranda rights, Wilber took him to the sheriff's office. Under questioning, Henry admitted that he had killed the boy, and later led the authorities to the pasture where he had stabbed him to death. He was then questioned over his wife's death, to which he readily admitted guilt as well.

As the two killings took place in separate counties, it was decided that Henry would have two trials: one in Hillsborough County for Christian's murder, and another in Pasco County for his wife's.

In preliminary hearings, his attorneys attempted to block a motion to introduce the confession from Henry, in which he implicated himself in both murders. Det. Wilber was brought in to testify, recalling that Henry had voluntarily admitted to both killings, albeit refusing to write them down or have them recorded. At both trials, Henry's attorneys argued that their client should not be considered eligible for the death penalty, claiming that his dependency on alcohol and drugs, as well as low-grade schizophrenia present since his birth, classified him as intellectually impaired. However, several psychiatrists who examined Henry determined that his schizophrenia did not impact his judgment and he could distinguish right from wrong. In the end, Henry was convicted on all counts in both trials and sentenced to death twice.

Four years later, however, the Supreme Court of Florida ruled that the extensive testimony concerning Christian's murder prejudiced the jury in the Suzanne Henry trial. In particular, it was noted that the jurors were shown autopsy photos of Christian's corpse, and so, it was ordered that Henry should be retried in both murders.

In the retrial, Wilber was brought in to testify again, repeating his testimony from years prior and emphasizing the apparent fact that Henry had attacked his wife, as nothing else in the apartment seemed out of place to indicate a fight. In the end, Henry was found guilty on all counts in the retrials, and was again resentenced to death.

== Execution ==
For the remainder of his life, Henry's attorneys attempted to appeal his sentence on the grounds that he was supposedly intellectually disabled on account of his abusive childhood, schizophrenia, and 70 IQ. All of his appeals were denied, and Governor Rick Scott signed his death warrant in 2014.

On June 18, 2014, Henry was executed via lethal injection at the Florida State Prison. He refused a last meal, and his final statement was "I can't undo what I've done. If I could, I would. I ask for your forgiveness if you can find it in your heart." His execution was welcomed by Selena Geiger, a niece of Suzanne, and cousin of Eugene, who said that she could finally be at peace knowing that her relatives' killer is now dead.

== See also ==
- Capital punishment in Florida
- List of people executed by lethal injection
- List of people executed in Florida
- List of people executed in the United States in 2014
- List of serial killers in the United States

Executions carried out in Florida
Preceded by Robert Eugene Hendrix April 23, 2014	John Ruthell Henry; June 18, 2014	Succeeded by Eddie Wayne Davis July 10, 2014
Executions carried out in the United States
Preceded by John E. Winfield – Missouri June 18, 2014	John Ruthell Henry – Florida; June 18, 2014	Succeeded by Eddie Wayne Davis – Florida July 10, 2014
