= List of people executed in the United States in 2014 =

Thirty-five people, thirty-three male and two female, were executed in the United States in 2014, all by lethal injection. Ten of them were in the state of Missouri, and another ten were in the state of Texas. Two (Edgar Tamayo Arias and Ramiro Hernandez-Llanas) were foreign nationals from Mexico. One (Juan Carlos Chavez) was a foreign national from Cuba.

== List of people executed in the United States in 2014 ==
No.	Date of execution	Name	Age of person			Gender	Ethnicity	State	Method	Ref.
No.	Date of execution	Name	At execution	At offense	Age difference	Gender	Ethnicity	State	Method	Ref.
1	January 7, 2014	Thomas Otis Knight	62	23	39	Male	Black	Florida	Lethal injection	
2	January 9, 2014	Michael Lee Wilson	38	22	16	Male	Black	Oklahoma	Lethal injection	
3	January 16, 2014	Dennis B. McGuire	53	29	24	Male	White	Ohio	Lethal injection	
4	January 22, 2014	Edgar Tamayo Arias	46	26	20	Male	Hispanic	Texas	Lethal injection	
5	January 23, 2014	Kenneth Eugene Hogan	52	26	26	Male	White	Oklahoma	Lethal injection	
6	January 29, 2014	Herbert L. Smulls	56	33	23	Male	Black	Missouri	Lethal injection	
7	February 5, 2014	Suzanne Margaret Basso	59	44	15	Female	White	Texas	Lethal injection	
8	February 12, 2014	Juan Carlos Chavez	46	28	18	Male	Hispanic	Florida	Lethal injection	
9	February 26, 2014	Michael Anthony Taylor	47	22	25	Male	Black	Missouri	Lethal injection	
10	February 26, 2014	Paul Augustus Howell	48	26	22	Male	Black	Florida	Lethal injection	
11	March 19, 2014	Ray Jasper III	33	18	15	Male	Black	Texas	Lethal injection	
12	March 20, 2014	Robert Laverne Henry	55	29	26	Male	Black	Florida	Lethal injection	
13	March 26, 2014	Jeffrey R. Ferguson	59	34	25	Male	White	Missouri	Lethal injection	
14	March 27, 2014	Anthony Dewayne Doyle	29	18	11	Male	Black	Texas	Lethal injection	
15	April 3, 2014	Tommy Lynn Sells	49	35	14	Male	White	Texas	Lethal injection	
16	April 9, 2014	Ramiro Hernandez-Llanas	44	28	16	Male	Hispanic	Texas	Lethal injection	
17	April 16, 2014	Jose Luis Villegas Jr.	39	25	14	Male	Hispanic	Texas	Lethal injection	
18	April 23, 2014	William Lewis Rousan	57	37	20	Male	White	Missouri	Lethal injection	
19	April 23, 2014	Robert Eugene Hendrix	47	23	24	Male	White	Florida	Lethal injection	
20	April 29, 2014	Clayton Derrell Lockett	38	23	15	Male	Black	Oklahoma	Lethal injection	
21	June 17, 2014	Marcus Alfonso Wellons	58	34	24	Male	Black	Georgia	Lethal injection	
22	June 18, 2014	John E. Winfield	43	26	17	Male	Black	Missouri	Lethal injection	
23	June 18, 2014	John Ruthell Henry	63	34	29	Male	Black	Florida	Lethal injection	
24	July 10, 2014	Eddie Wayne Davis	45	25	20	Male	White	Florida	Lethal injection	
25	July 16, 2014	John C. Middleton	54	35	19	Male	White	Missouri	Lethal injection	
26	July 23, 2014	Joseph Rudolph Wood III	55	30	25	Male	White	Arizona	Lethal injection	
27	August 6, 2014	Michael Shane Worthington	43	24	19	Male	White	Missouri	Lethal injection	
28	September 10, 2014	Earl Ringo Jr.	40	24	16	Male	Black	Missouri	Lethal injection	
29	September 10, 2014	Willie Tyrone Trottie	45	23	22	Male	Black	Texas	Lethal injection	
30	September 17, 2014	Lisa Ann Coleman	38	28	10	Female	Black	Texas	Lethal injection	
31	October 28, 2014	Miguel Angel Paredes	32	18	14	Male	Hispanic	Texas	Lethal injection	
32	November 13, 2014	Chadwick Dewellyn Banks	43	21	22	Male	Black	Florida	Lethal injection	
33	November 19, 2014	Leon Vincent Taylor	56	36	20	Male	Black	Missouri	Lethal injection	
34	December 9, 2014	Robert Wayne Holsey	49	30	19	Male	Black	Georgia	Lethal injection	
35	December 10, 2014	Paul Terrence Goodwin	48	31	17	Male	White	Missouri	Lethal injection	
		Average:	48 years	28 years	20 years					

== Demographics ==
Gender
Male	33	94%
Female	2	6%
Ethnicity
Black	18	51%
White	12	34%
Hispanic	5	15%
State
Missouri	10	29%
Texas	10	29%
Florida	8	23%
Oklahoma	3	9%
Georgia	2	6%
Arizona	1	3%
Ohio	1	3%
Method
Lethal injection	35	100%
Month
January	6	17%
February	4	12%
March	4	12%
April	6	14%
May	0	0%
June	3	9%
July	3	9%
August	1	3%
September	3	9%
October	1	3%
November	2	6%
December	2	6%
Age
20–29	1	3%
30–39	5	14%
40–49	16	46%
50–59	11	31%
60–69	2	6%
Total	35	100%

== Executions in recent years ==
Number of executions
2015	28
2014	35
2013	39
Total	102

== Notable executions ==
2014 was a notable year for executions. A total of ten death row inmates were executed in Missouri throughout the year, the most carried out by Missouri in a single year since capital punishment resumed in 1976. 2014 also marked the first time since 2002 in which two women were executed during a single year. Suzanne Margaret Basso and Lisa Ann Coleman, who were both sentenced to death in Texas, were executed just seven months apart. One notable execution was of convicted murderer Thomas Knight, who was executed in Florida. Knight spent thirty-nine years on death row before his execution was carried out.

There were also three botched executions in 2014:

- Convicted killer Dennis McGuire, age 53, took nearly 30 minutes to die – the longest execution ever recorded of the 56 carried out in Ohio since capital punishment resumed in 1999. His execution led to a three year delay on executions being carried out in Ohio. The state did not execute any more inmates until July 2017.
- Convicted rapist and murderer Clayton Lockett suffered a heart attack during his execution in Oklahoma – he was pronounced dead 43 minutes after being sedated and reportedly writhed, groaned, convulsed, and spoke during the process. He also attempted to rise from the execution table 14 minutes into the procedure.
- Convicted murderer Joseph Rudolph Wood III, who was executed in Arizona, was pronounced dead 1 hour and 57 minutes after the drugs were injected into his system – the entire procedure took almost 2 hours when it should have taken about 10 minutes.

== See also ==
- Capital punishment in the United States
- List of botched executions
- List of juveniles executed in the United States since 1976
- List of women executed in the United States since 1976
- List of United States Supreme Court decisions on capital punishment

Preceded by 2013	List of people executed in the United States in 2014	Succeeded by 2015
