= Paul Augustus Howell =

American convicted murderer and drug trafficker (1965–2014)

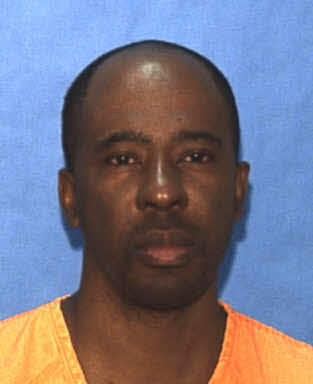
- Born: June 25, 1965; Jamaica
- Died: February 26, 2014 (aged 48); Florida State Prison, Florida, U.S.
- Status: Executed by lethal injection
- Motive: eliminate witness of drug trafficking ring which was then intercepted by victim
- Convictions: Federal: Racketeering; Money laundering; Conspiracy; Drug possession; Florida: First degree murder
- Penalty: Federal: Life imprisonment; Florida: Death

Details
- Victims: 2
- Date: February 1, 1992
- Country: United States
- State: Florida
- Location: Jefferson County, Florida
- Imprisoned at: Union Correctional Institution

Paul Augustus Howell (June 25, 1965 – February 26, 2014) was an American convicted murderer and drug trafficker found guilty of the 1992 bomb murder of a state trooper. On February 1, 1992, Howell, who was part of a drug trafficking ring, plotted to kill a witness to cover up his involvement in a previous murder case by sending the witness a gift-wrapped bomb made out of a microwave oven, and directed another person to bring it to the said witness. However, Florida Highway Patrol Trooper Jimmy Fulford pulled the man's car over for speeding, and when he retrieved the bomb from the car, the bomb exploded and killed Fulford on the spot.

Howell was subsequently linked to the murder and arrested, and charged with first-degree murder in the state of Florida, while at the same time, he was charged under federal law for drug offences. Howell was convicted of multiple federal counts – including drug possession, money laundering, racketeering and conspiracy – and sentenced to life imprisonment. Howell was also found guilty of state murder charges, sentenced to death and executed on February 26, 2014.

== Background and criminal history ==
Paul Augustus Howell was born in Jamaica and immigrated to the United States with his family during childhood, settling in Broward County, Florida. He attended local schools and graduated from Plantation High School. According to his mother, Howell was raised in a churchgoing household where she sought to teach her children right from wrong. Unlike his younger brother, Patrick, Howell had no known criminal record during his youth. After graduating from high school, he enlisted in the United States Army, where he served for seven years as an electronics technician. Following his discharge in 1990, federal investigators alleged that he became involved in the drug trafficking organization operated by both Patrick and another man named Michael Morgan.

The drug trafficking ring, known as the Jamaican Posse, was first operated during the late 1980s, and handled a large crack cocaine distribution network across Florida, Alabama, Georgia, Mississippi, North Carolina, and South Carolina. The organization was led primarily by three members: Patrick, Morgan, and Egnatius Johnson, with Howell, Patricia Clarke, Norris Mothersill, and Errol Morrison serving as key participants. Johnson supplied cocaine from the Bahamas, using couriers traveling on cruise ships to smuggle it into Florida. Patrick and Morgan oversaw crack cocaine distribution in Marianna, Florida, before expanding operations into neighboring states. Clarke assisted in transporting cocaine throughout the Southeast, while Paul Howell assumed a leadership role in the organization after Patrick Howell's incarceration in late 1991.

In August 1991, Paul Howell, Patrick and Michael Morgan were involved in the murder of Fort Lauderdale drug dealer Alphonso Tillman, whom the latter two men planned to rob. Howell rented the vehicle used in the robbery, while Morgan obtained a firearm to facilitate the crime. During the robbery, Patrick drove the rental car and Morgan fatally shot Tillman. Following the killing, the Howell brothers and Patricia Clarke cleaned the interior of the rental vehicle in an effort to remove evidence, and according to court summary and testimonies, the vehicle contained blood and bullet damage after the shooting. Yolanda McCalister, Patrick's girlfriend, later testified that Patrick admitted the killing to her and threatened to kill her and her family if she disclosed what she knew. Tammie Bailey, Morgan's girlfriend, and McCalister subsequently observed blood, bullet holes inside the vehicle, and blood on Patrick's shorts.

== Murder of Jimmy Fulford ==
In January 1992, five months after the murder of Alphonso Tillman, Paul Howell intended to kill Tammie Bailey, the girlfriend of his fellow syndicate member Michael Morgan, to prevent her from becoming a witness to identify him as a suspect behind the murder of Tillman. As part of his plot, Howell constructed a bomb by rigging a microwave oven with a pipe bomb, and Howell hired another man, Lester Watson, to deliver the bomb to the woman.

On February 1, 1992, Watson drove a rented car to the house of Bailey in order to deliver the gift-wrapped bomb as instructed by Howell, although Watson claimed to be unaware that he was delivering a bomb, and instead believed that the microwave contained drugs. Watson, who was accompanied by Curtis Williams during the drive, was later pulled over by Florida Highway Trooper James "Jimmy" Fulford for speeding. Fulford conducted a registration check on the car and asked for Watson's identification, but Watson gave the trooper a false alias and birth date because he did not have a driver's license. As a result, Watson was arrested, and when the police radio dispatcher uncovered that the car was rented by Howell and contacted him about Watson's arrest, Howell admitted he loaned the rented car to Watson but he kept silent about the existence of the bomb.

Subsequently, two Jefferson County sheriff's deputies arrived to bring Watson into custody, and Watson allowed the police officers to search the car. Fulford found the microwave inside the car, and while he was holding it, the bomb suddenly exploded, killing the 35-year-old trooper on the spot. After the bombing and murder of Fulford, Howell was arrested as a suspect and charged with first-degree murder, and Watson himself was also arrested for his part in the trooper's murder. In the aftermath of Howell's arrest, the investigations into Fulford's murder gradually led to a state and federal investigation that led to a crackdown on the drug trafficking syndicate, of which Howell was a key member, and in total, 28 people were arrested and indicted for charges pertaining to the drug smuggling operation.

== Murder trial ==
=== Federal prosecution ===
On August 10, 1992, a federal grand jury Tuesday issued a 15-count racketeering indictment for Paul Howell, his brother Patrick Howell and 12 other alleged members of their drug trafficking syndicate.

On January 13, 1993, Paul Howell, his brother Patrick Howell, and seven alleged members of the drug smuggling syndicate stood trial together before U.S. District Judge William Stafford in a Tallahassee federal trial court for various charges of drug trafficking, racketeering and murder. Another eight members had pleaded guilty or still remained on the run as of the time Howell stood trial. Two more suspects, Colin Reddie and Devon Mitchell, pleaded guilty to lesser drug and weapon charges, for which they faced at least 15 years in prison, and were set to testify in Howell's federal trial.

On March 9, 1993, at the end of the joint trial, eight defendants (two women and six men) were found guilty as charged. Howell and Patrick were found guilty of racketeering charges for the murders of Fulford and Alphonso Tillman, plus other charges which included money laundering, drug possession and conspiracy. The rest were similarly convicted of various charges like racketeering, money laundering, drug possession and conspiracy.

On May 11, 1993, Howell, Patrick and the four male defendants (Norris Mothersill, Michael Morgan, Errol Morrison and Egnatius Johnson) were all sentenced to life in prison. A day later, the two female defendants, Patricia Clarke and Chantell Biggs, were sentenced to life and 30 years in prison respectively.

=== State prosecution ===
Apart from the federal charges, Howell, alongside his brother Patrick and Lester Watson, were indicted by a Jefferson County grand jury in February 1992 for first-degree murder charges over the death of Fulford. A fourth suspect, Leroy Williams, was charged with obstructing justice and making and discharging a destructive device, but not with murder.

After the end of his federal drug trafficking trial, Howell and Patrick were both arranged to stand trial on September 19, 1994, in the state courts of Florida for the murder of Fulford. At the beginning of the trial, however, the brothers got into a physical dispute, starting with Patrick attacking Howell, before deputies broke up the fight, and no one was injured in this incident. Lester Watson, the third suspect charged with Fulford's murder, reached a plea agreement and faced the maximum of 40 years in prison for second-degree murder, in exchange for his testimony against the Howell brothers in their upcoming trial.

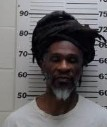
Patrick Howell federal prison mugshot

On October 10, 1994, midway through the jury selection phase, Patrick pleaded no contest to the murder charge after reaching a plea bargain with the prosecution. As a result of the plea deal, Patrick was sentenced to life imprisonment after the prosecution agreed to take the death penalty off the table as a condition of the agreement. Additionally, Patrick's life sentence was ordered to run consecutively with the other life term he received for federal drug offences. After Patrick's sentencing, Howell was the sole remaining defendant left to continue standing trial for Fulford's murder.

On October 18, 1994, after three hours of deliberation, the jury found Howell guilty of first-degree murder, and therefore faced a potential death sentence or life imprisonment with the possibility of parole after 25 years.

On October 21, 1994, the jury recommended by a majority vote of 10–2 to sentence Howell to death for the murder of Fulford. During a hearing in December 1994 before Howell's formal sentencing, Fulford's widow reportedly implored the judge to sentence Howell to death for murdering her husband, remarking that the act was done in cold blood and that Howell could have told the dispatcher to inform her husband not to open the package before the bomb killed him. Formal sentencing was scheduled on January 10, 1995.

On January 10, 1995, Howell was formally sentenced to death via the electric chair by Circuit Judge F. E. Steinmeyer. In his verdict, Judge Steinmeyer cited that the various aggravating circumstances outweighed the mitigating factors such as Howell's honorable military service and lack of criminal records, and noted that the bomb was created as part of a meticulous plan to silence a witness, and these formed the grounds of sentencing Howell to death.

== Appeals ==
On July 11, 1996, the 11th Circuit Court of Appeals dismissed the appeals of Howell and his seven co-defendants from the federal trial.

On February 12, 1998, the Florida Supreme Court denied Howell's direct appeal against his death sentence.

On May 6, 2004, Howell's post-conviction appeal was rejected by the Florida Supreme Court.

On July 6, 2005, Howell's death sentence appeal was dismissed by the 11th Circuit Court of Appeals.

In early 2013, Governor Rick Scott signed a death warrant for Howell, scheduling him to be executed on February 26, 2013. As a final resort, Howell appealed to the Florida Supreme Court to stave off his execution. However, the Florida Supreme Court rejected his appeal.

On February 25, 2013, the eve of his scheduled execution, the 11th Circuit Court of Appeals granted a stay of execution for Howell. Subsequently, the stay order was upheld by the U.S. Supreme Court, which likewise agreed to delay the execution.

== Execution ==
On January 17, 2014, a new death warrant was signed for Paul Howell, re-scheduling his execution date as February 26, 2014.

On February 26, 2014, 48-year-old Paul Augustus Howell was put to death by lethal injection at the Florida State Prison. Prior to his execution, Howell ate a peanut butter and jelly sandwich as his last meal, and met with a spiritual adviser. In his last statement, Howell apologized to the family of Jimmy Fulford, and placed the blame on his friend for letting the bomb go off. He was pronounced dead at 6:32 pm, several minutes after the drugs were first administered to him.

== Aftermath ==
In February 2017, a memorial was held at the bombing site by Jimmy Fulford's family and friends on the 25th anniversary of his death.

In February 2023, the 31st anniversary of Fulford's death, his friends and colleagues gathered to commemorate Fulford at the roadside where the bombing took place, like they did annually for the past 31 years.

== See also ==
- Capital punishment in Florida
- List of people executed in Florida
- List of people executed in the United States in 2014

Executions carried out in Florida
| Preceded by Juan Carlos Chavez February 12, 2014 | Paul Augustus Howell; February 26, 2014 | Succeeded by Robert Laverne Henry March 20, 2014 |
Executions carried out in the United States
| Preceded by Michael Anthony Taylor – Missouri February 26, 2014 | Paul Augustus Howell – Florida; February 26, 2014 | Succeeded by Ray Jasper III – Texas March 19, 2014 |
