= Mark DeFriest =

American criminal (born 1960)

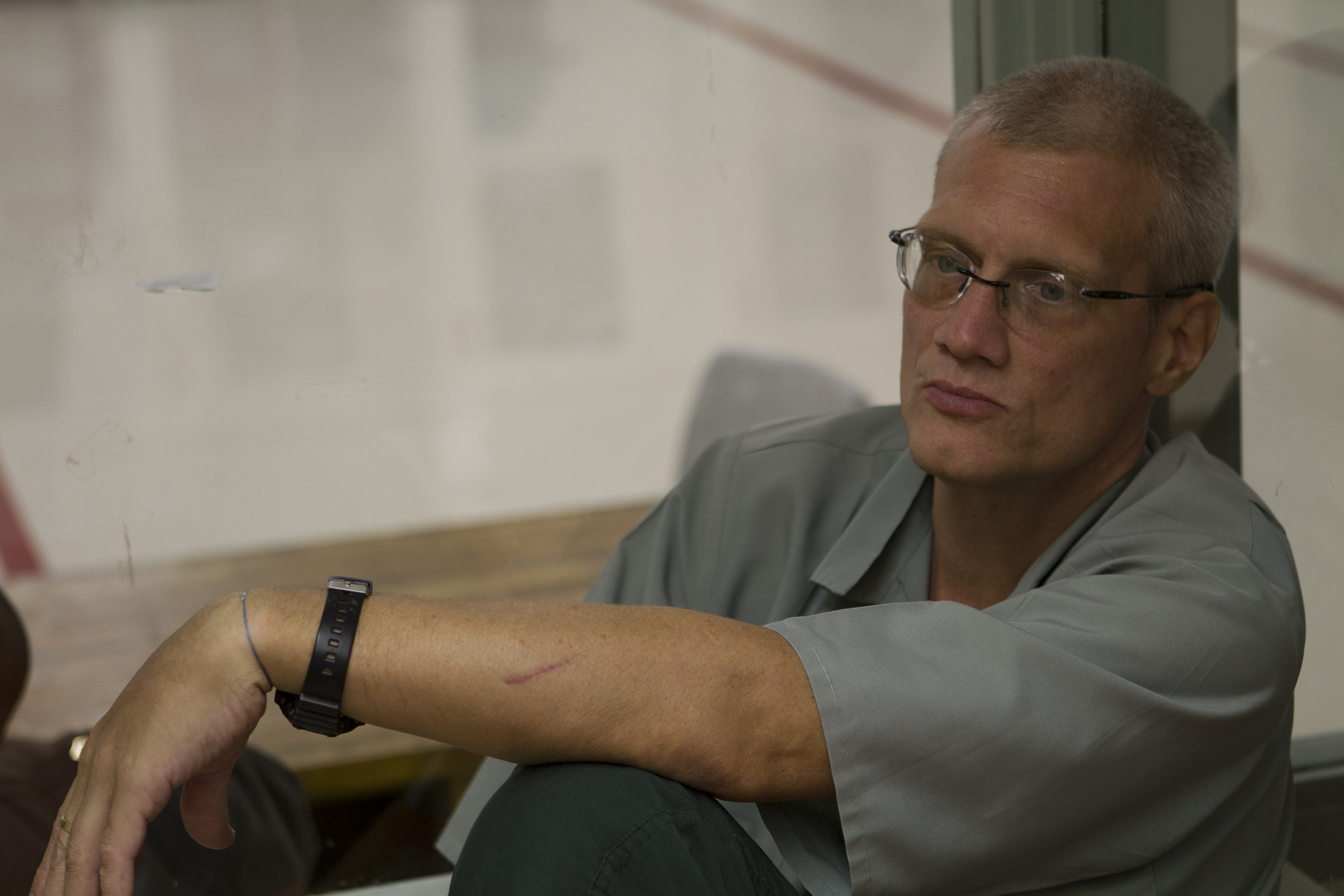
- DeFriest during the filming of The Mind of Mark DeFriest
- Born: August 18, 1960 (age 66); Tallahassee, Florida, U.S.
- Other name: Houdini of Florida
- Citizenship: American
- Education: GED
- Known for: 7-time escaped convict
- Spouse: Bonnie DeFriest
- Status: Incarcerated
- Convictions: Grand theft (1980); Burglary (1982); Escaping prison (1980); Attempting to escape prison (1981)
- Criminal charges: Grand theft, burglary, escape
- Penalty: 4 years, life, 2 years

Details
- Date apprehended: 1980
- Imprisoned at: Suwannee Correctional Institution

Mark DeFriest (born August 18, 1960), known as the Houdini of Florida, is an American man known for his repeated escapes from prison, having successfully done so 7 times. Born in rural Florida, he was arrested for the first time in 1978, serving for a year. In 1980, DeFriest was sentenced to four years in prison for violating probation via illegal firearms possession, having initially been arrested for retrieving work tools that his recently deceased father had willed him before the will had completed probate. His sentence has since been repeatedly extended for having attempted to escape 13 times (including one count of armed robbery during one attempt), as well as collecting hundreds of disciplinary reports for minor infractions, leading to a cumulative stay of 34 years in prison.

DeFriest has cumulatively spent 27 years in solitary confinement. Following publicity, DeFriest was granted parole and released on February 5, 2019. Ten days later, he was rearrested as he checked into a mental health facility.

== Early life ==
DeFriest grew up in rural Gadsden County, near Tallahassee, Florida, where he worked with his father. He was a known savant who could not quite understand people, but was able to build or fix just about anything. At six years old, he was disassembling and reassembling watches and engines. He often devised and conducted elaborate science experiments in his family's basement, saying he blew himself up a few times. While his mechanical knowledge was rapidly increasing, his psychological wellbeing continued to worsen.

DeFriest was close with his father, who encouraged his mechanical abilities, and the two had what filmmaker Gabriel London called "a mechanical connection." His father had served in World War II with the OSS, a predecessor to the CIA. This experience likely prompted Mark's father to teach his son the avoidance tactics, survival, and defense techniques that Mark describes as guerilla warfare. DeFriest's father died suddenly in 1979. In his will, the elder DeFriest left his tools to his son, Mark.

== Initial arrest ==
DeFriest, who was struggling with mental health issues at the time, collected the tools. However, the will had not completed probate, which meant that, in the eyes of the law, the tools had been stolen. DeFriest's stepmother called the police and he was arrested. When the police came for DeFriest, he ran from them out of panic. He took a gun with him, but never used it or even brandished it before the officers. For the theft, DeFriest was sentenced to four years in prison. Subsequent escapes led to a life sentence as well as years of emotional and physical abuse within the prison system.

== Mental state and legal competence ==
DeFriest had always behaved erratically. Highly intelligent but lacking in social skills, he stood out in prison. This outsider mentality may have fueled his decision to attempt escape from every facility that ever housed him.

Five out of six psychiatrists deemed DeFriest incompetent and mentally ill. At the time, the dissenting psychiatrist, Robert Berland, believed DeFriest's behavior (which included assumption of false identities as well as his compulsive escape attempts) was intentional. Based on Berland's assessment, the court allowed DeFriest to stand trial and he accepted a life sentence. Berland reversed his assessment decades later.

Today, professionals think DeFriest's behavioral problems are likely associated with autism spectrum disorder, which may impair the development of social skills and cause an inability to judge the emotions of others.

== Prison escapes ==
DeFriest made his first escape after a month at Florida State Hospital in Chattahoochee. He put LSD-25 from the hospital's pharmacy into the staff's coffee, in a plan to slip out while the staff was under the drug's influence. The plan fell apart when security arrived and the ward was locked down. He and a few other prisoners attempted to scale the facility's boundary wall. DeFriest got over the fence, hot-wired a car, and made a successful escape before being recaptured and sent to Bay County Jail. He has made use of various creative inventions and methods throughout his various escape attempts, such as replicating keys from any available material after memorizing their patterns and fashioning a zip gun out of a toothpaste tube. During one of these escapes, DeFriest stole a car using a gun, for which he was later charged with armed robbery.

== Treatment in prison ==
DeFriest was subject to abuse by prison guards throughout his time in prison. He cumulatively spent 27 years in solitary confinement.

He experienced the bulk of the abuse at the Florida State Prison (FSP), having been transferred there in 1982. Ron McAndrew, who served as warden from 1996 to 1998, described the northern Florida prison as "ungovernable", describing situations where squads "composed of correctional officers roamed the cell blocks, beating and degrading prisoners with impunity", with these officers additionally turning a blind eye to violence between inmates. He was a target of abuse due to his character: according to Bill Cornwell, DeFriest was a "walk alone", refusing to align with any gangs in the prison and mostly keeping to himself: "Anyone familiar with the inner workings of a penal institution will tell you that an inmate who stands out, who is a loner, who is troubled and vulnerable, is imperiled."

Florida State Prison's solitary confinement served as an "escape-proof" cell, one that The Miami Herald reported held the only nonviolent inmate in the solitary confinement ward—one floor above the electric chair. There, prison officials deprived DeFriest of books, magazines, radio, TV, windows, sunlight, water,toiletries, and even his glasses for 11 days.

Although 209 disciplinary reports have been filed against DeFriest, McAndrew doubted the veracity of many of them: although he was aware of DeFriest engaging in less flagrant displays of rule breaking, he asserted in an interview with Cornwell that many of them were false accusations designed to prolong his time in prison.

DeFriest's attorney John Middleton told the Miami Herald that "He's not shanking or stabbing anyone. The reports are for possessing contraband. He's made his own alcohol. He's had weapons, usually defensive. He has not hurt people."

In 1999, DeFriest witnessed the fatal beating of Frank Valdes who had been convicted of murdering a correctional officer. DeFriest was a few cells away and confirmed the medical examiner's conclusion that Valdes was beaten to death. For his protection, DeFriest was transferred to a prison in California.

== Documentary film ==
2014 saw the release, both in theaters and on Showtime, of director Gabriel London's documentary The Mind of Mark DeFriest. In his review of the film, The Washington Post's Michael O’Sullivan wrote, "London turns the portrait of an escape artist into a powerful indictment of the American prison system, which many reformers, London included, argue merely warehouses the mentally ill."

In the Miami Herald in November 2014, DeFriest's attorney John Middleton was quoted as having said "we’re punishing him for being mentally ill. That's what's happening here."

== Parole hearings, release, and prisoner status ==
In the last 15 years, efforts to persuade the Florida government and parole board to release DeFriest have included petitions started by his wife Bonnie DeFriest (whom he met through a pen-pal list), legal representation by John Middleton, psychiatrist Robert Berland's recanting of his assessment of DeFriest in the 1980s and outspoken positive reports from former warden of Florida State Prison Ron McAndrew.

DeFriest's parole hearing on November 19, 2014, in Tallahassee saw the unprecedented reduction of his potential release date from 2085 to March 2015. This would have made a possible release date of March 2015, but additional outstanding sentences for cocaine, marijuana, contraband possession, and armed robbery were not first considered.

DeFriest was finally granted parole on February 5, 2019, with one of the conditions being that he spend 12 months in a mental health and substance abuse treatment facility. Community Outreach, Inc. in Corvallis, Oregon was agreed upon due to its proximity to his wife Bonnie's home. DeFriest entered the facility on February 7, 2019.

By February 13, Community Outreach revoked DeFriest's residence due to unspecified behavioral violations. This raised the question of whether the Oregon facility was appropriately informed, prepared or capable of providing DeFriest with the treatment, structure, and care he needed for a successful transition into public life, as did the revelation that DeFriest tested positive for methamphetamine at the facility. The director of the facility described DeFriest as exhibiting "bipolar mania".

As the behavioral issues and drug use were violations of DeFriest's parole, Oregon began his transfer back to the Florida state prison system only 10 days after his release. Although advocates were initially optimistic for a quick re-release and second try, as of 2022, DeFriest remained incarcerated in Florida.

== See also ==
- Mentally ill people in United States jails and prisons
