= Ronald Phillips (murderer) =

American executed criminal (1973–2017)

- Born: Ronald Ray Phillips; October 10, 1973; Bell County, Texas, U.S.
- Died: July 26, 2017 (aged 43); Southern Ohio Correctional Facility, Lucasville, Ohio, U.S.
- Cause of death: Execution by lethal injection
- Convictions: Aggravated murder Felonious sexual penetration Rape (3 counts)
- Penalty: Death (September 16, 1993)

Details
- Victims: Sheila Marie Evans, 3
- Date: January 18, 1993

Ronald Ray Phillips (October 10, 1973 – July 26, 2017) was an Ohio death row inmate who was sentenced to death and executed for the 1993 rape and murder of Sheila Evans (September 10, 1989 – January 18, 1993), the 3-year-old daughter of his girlfriend, Fae Amanda Evans (March 29, 1967 – July 8, 2008), after an extended period of physical and sexual abuse against the child. Evans was convicted of involuntary manslaughter and child endangering for her involvement and sentenced to a maximum of 30 years in prison. She died of leukemia on July 8, 2008, aged 41, at the state prison hospital in Columbus, Ohio.

== Background ==
Phillips was born on October 10, 1973, in Bell County, Texas, the fifth of seven children to William D. Phillips Sr. (August 18, 1948 – September 29, 2009) and Donna M. Phillips (December 17, 1947 – January 11, 2016). His childhood nickname was "Bubby". Phillips allegedly suffered a traumatic childhood which involved mental illness and physical and sexual abuse mainly by his father, but also by his cousin.

== Issues with Ohio's executions ==
Phillips is notable for having a drawn-out case. He spent over half of his life on death row since he was sentenced on September 16, 1993, and had a total of 9 execution dates set between November 2013 and July 2017.

His first execution date of November 14, 2013, was stayed to consider his request to donate his non-vital organs before his execution, a request which was later denied on the grounds that he would not have enough time to recover before his new execution date of July 2, 2014. Several execution dates were set and stayed for not only Phillips, but several other inmates, as a result of questions regarding the constitutionality of Ohio's lethal injection protocol, as well as whether Ohio had access to execution drugs.

A group of inmates, consisting of Phillips, Gary Otte, and Raymond Tibbetts, challenged Ohio's execution protocol, and thus a federal judge granted them a preliminary injunction on January 26, 2017. The Court of Appeals for the Sixth Circuit ruled 8–6 in favor of the State of Ohio on June 28, 2017. Otte was executed in September 2017, while Governor John Kasich commuted Tibbetts' sentence to life without parole in July 2018.

== Execution ==
In an order published by Ohio Governor John Kasich on May 1, 2017, Phillips' execution was rescheduled from May 10, 2017, to July 26, 2017. Following the approval of Ohio's lethal injection protocol four weeks prior to the execution date, Phillips' attorneys filed a flurry of appeals to the Supreme Court of the United States, all of which were denied. Governor Kasich also refused to call off the execution, following a unanimous recommendation against clemency by the Ohio Parole Board. A day before his execution, he had a last meal of a large cheese, bell pepper, and mushroom pizza, strawberry cheesecake, a piece of unleavened bread, a Pepsi, and grape juice. He reportedly used the unleavened bread and grape juice for the sake of a makeshift communion shortly before his execution. Ronald Phillips was pronounced dead at 10:43 a.m. on Wednesday, July 26, 2017, ending a 3 1/2-year hiatus on executions in Ohio.

== See also ==
- Capital punishment in Ohio
- Capital punishment in the United States
- List of people executed in Ohio
- List of people executed in the United States in 2017

Executions carried out in Ohio
Preceded by Dennis McGuire January 16, 2014	Ronald Phillips; July 26, 2017	Succeeded by Gary Otte September 13, 2017
Executions carried out in the United States
Preceded by William Morva – Virginia July 6, 2017	Ronald Phillips – Ohio; July 26, 2017	Succeeded by Taichin Preyor – Texas July 27, 2017
