= Gary Otte =

American executed criminal (1971–2017)

- Born: Gary Wayne Otte; December 21, 1971; Terre Haute, Indiana, U.S.
- Died: September 13, 2017 (aged 45); Southern Ohio Correctional Facility, Lucasville, Ohio, U.S.
- Cause of death: Execution by lethal injection
- Convictions: Aggravated murder (2 counts); Aggravated robbery (2 counts); Aggravated burglary (2 counts)
- Penalty: Death (October 1992)

Details
- Victims: Robert R. Wasikowski, 61; Sharon L. Kostura, 45
- Date: February 12–13, 1992

Gary Wayne Otte (December 21, 1971 – September 13, 2017) was an Ohio death row inmate who was sentenced to death and executed for the 1992 murders of Robert Wasikowski (May 30, 1930 – February 12, 1992) and Sharon Kostura (December 12, 1946 – February 13, 1992), whom he killed in back-to-back robberies in February 1992 in Parma, Ohio.

== Background ==
Gary Otte was born on December 21, 1971, in Terre Haute, Indiana. He was described as a 'very sad little boy' who began using drugs and drinking alcohol at 10 and first attempted suicide at 14. The killings took place six years later, when Otte was 20. At his October 1992 trial, Gary Otte was sentenced to death for murder.

Otte's IQ was purportedly only 85, although this would not bar him from execution. Otte was involved in a lawsuit challenging the constitutionality of Ohio's execution procedures, alongside fellow death row inmates Ronald Phillips and Raymond Tibbetts, which would ultimately be dismissed in late June 2017. Phillips' execution followed less than a month later on July 26. Otte made several last minute pleas for clemency, all of which would be rejected. These included claims that Ohio's lethal injection protocol violated the Eighth Amendment, and that his age at the time of the killings would make his execution unconstitutional. All of these claims were eventually denied.

== Execution ==
In an order published by Ohio Governor John Kasich on May 1, 2017, Otte's execution was rescheduled from June 13, 2017, to September 13, 2017. Following the denial of all his last minute appeals, Otte was executed as scheduled on the morning of Wednesday, September 13, 2017. For his final meal, Otte ordered and received a mushroom and Swiss cheeseburger, a double cheeseburger with lettuce and tomato, mozzarella sticks, jalapeño poppers, Miracle Whip, a quart of Heath bar ice cream, two doughnuts, slice of banana cream pie, and soda. In his final statement, Otte professed his love for his family, apologized to the families of the victims, and sang the hymn "The Greatest Thing". His final words were a statement attributed to Jesus Christ during his crucifixion: "Father, forgive them for they know not what they're doing." Otte was pronounced dead at 10:54 a.m. He was 45 years old.

== See also ==
- Capital punishment in Ohio
- Capital punishment in the United States
- List of people executed in Ohio
- List of people executed in the United States in 2017

Executions carried out in Ohio
Preceded by Ronald Phillips July 26, 2017	Gary Otte; September 13, 2017	Succeeded by Robert Van Hook July 18, 2018
Executions carried out in the United States
Preceded by Mark Asay – Florida August 24, 2017	Gary Otte – Ohio; September 13, 2017	Succeeded by Michael Lambrix – Florida October 5, 2017
