= Claudine Dianne Ryce =

American advocate for missing children

Claudine Dianne Ryce (September 9, 1942 – January 21, 2009) was an advocate for missing children from Miami, Florida. Her son, Jimmy Ryce, was kidnapped, raped and murdered in 1995.

Ryce lobbied for sexual predator legislation, created the Jimmy Ryce Center for Victims of Predatory Abduction, and was a founder of Team Hope, a group of parents of abducted children supporting parents and families facing child abduction. Ryce also worked for passage of the Jimmy Ryce Act. She was inducted into the Florida Women's Hall of Fame in 2009/2010.
