= Execution of Dennis McGuire =

2014 botched execution in Ohio, US

Dennis McGuire
- Born: Dennis B. McGuire; February 10, 1960; Warren County, Ohio, U.S.
- Died: January 16, 2014 (aged 53); Southern Ohio Correctional Facility, Lucasville, Ohio, U.S.
- Cause of death: Botched execution by lethal injection
- Convictions: Aggravated murder Rape; Kidnapping
- Penalty: Death (December 8, 1994)

Details
- Victims: Joy Stewart, 22
- Date: February 11, 1989
- Weapon: Knife

The death of Dennis McGuire occurred on January 16, 2014, at the Southern Ohio Correctional Facility in Lucasville, Ohio, in what was considered to be a botched execution. McGuire was executed via lethal injection using a new combination of untried and untested drugs: midazolam and hydromorphone. During the execution, witnesses reported that McGuire could be seen struggling to breathe, and reportedly gasped loudly while making snorting and choking sounds for at least ten minutes. It took over twenty-five minutes for McGuire to die, in a process that should normally take just over eight minutes.

The execution led to an unofficial moratorium on capital punishment in Ohio for over three years. McGuire's family filed a civil rights lawsuit against the state and an Illinois drug company. The lawsuit was later dropped by the family after the Ohio Department of Rehabilitation and Correction announced it would abandon the execution method it had used on McGuire. The state did not carry out another execution until July 2017.

== Background ==
Dennis B. McGuire (February 10, 1960 – January 16, 2014) was sentenced to death on December 8, 1994, for the 1989 rape and murder of 22-year-old Joy Stewart in West Alexandria, Ohio. Stewart disappeared on February 11, 1989, and her body was found by two hikers the following day in the woods near Bantas Creek. An autopsy was performed, and it was determined she had died from having her throat cut by a knife, which had severed her carotid artery and jugular vein. No leads came in for the case until December 1989, when McGuire, who was in prison for an unrelated crime, spoke with police, and told them that his brother-in-law had murdered Stewart.

McGuire knew details about the crime that had not been made public, making investigators take his allegation seriously. However, as new details emerged, it became apparent that McGuire had been the actual perpetrator. DNA testing carried out in 1992 proved that McGuire had raped and murdered Stewart. On December 22, 1993, McGuire was charged with one count of aggravated murder, two counts of rape, and one count of kidnapping. On December 8, 1994, McGuire was found guilty of all charges, and the jury recommended a death sentence.

Joy Stewart's husband, Kenny Stewart, was questioned as a suspect and killed himself in 1990, prior to being cleared.

== Execution ==
McGuire spent over nineteen years on death row until his execution date, which was scheduled for January 16, 2014. In September 2013, the state of Ohio ran out of the drug pentobarbital. The drug, originally manufactured in Denmark, was subject to strict export licenses that prevented it being sold to departments of correction within the United States. European-based manufacturers banned prisons in the United States from using their drugs in executions. Because of this, the state of Ohio was forced to use a new combination of drugs to execute McGuire.

The state decided on a combination of the drugs midazolam, a sedative, and hydromorphone, an opioid painkiller. The combination had never been tried or tested before. McGuire's lawyers had warned ahead of the proceeding that the new combination of drugs may subject McGuire to air hunger, which would cause him to suffocate to death. In court proceedings, an Ohio state prosecutor bluntly stated that McGuire was not necessarily and automatically entitled to a painless execution, and a judge allowed the execution to proceed.

At 10:27 a.m. on the morning of January 16, 2014, at the Southern Ohio Correctional Facility, McGuire was injected with both drugs after he gave a final statement. According to a witness at the execution, four minutes into the procedure, McGuire could be seen struggling and gasping loudly for air. He made snorting and choking sounds, which lasted for at least ten to fifteen minutes. At 10:53 a.m., McGuire was pronounced dead. The execution took over twenty-six minutes, in a process that should have normally taken around eight. It was the longest execution ever recorded in Ohio.

During the execution his stomach allegedly swelled up in an unusual way similar to a hernia. Witnesses also stated that he clenched his fists, struggled and gasped audibly for air.

His last meal was roast beef, fried chicken, a bagel with cream cheese, fried potatoes with onions, potato salad, butter pecan ice cream, and a Coke.

== Aftermath ==
Following the execution, McGuire's family planned to sue the state of Ohio for inflicting cruel and unusual punishment in violation of the US constitution. A professor of anesthesia at Harvard Medical School told an Ohio court that using midazolam was inappropriate in an execution, and that the state ran the risk of McGuire being conscious for up to five minutes while suffocating. The human rights group Reprieve also released a statement in response, saying they were shocked that the state had gone ahead with the execution, despite the warnings from experts.

All pending executions in Ohio were put on hold, and an unofficial moratorium on capital punishment in Ohio was declared by Governor John Kasich. The state then tried to find compounded or specially mixed versions of lethal drugs, but was unsuccessful. Kasich later signed a bill into law that shielded the names of companies that provide the state of Ohio with lethal injection drugs.

Over a year later, McGuire's family dropped its civil rights lawsuit against the state after the Ohio Department of Rehabilitation and Correction announced it would abandon the execution method it had used on McGuire in favor of alternative anesthetics. The decision satisfied McGuire's family. Kasich ruled out looking for alternative execution methods, such as hanging or firing squad.

It took over three years before Ohio planned to resume executions with a new, three-drug combination: midazolam, rocuronium bromide, and potassium chloride. In July 2017, convicted murderer Ronald Philips was the next person to be executed after McGuire, using the new three-drug combination.

== See also ==
- Capital punishment in Ohio
- Capital punishment in the United States
- Execution of Jeffrey Landrigan
- Execution of Clayton Lockett
- Execution of Joseph Wood
- List of botched executions
- List of people executed in Ohio
- List of people executed in the United States in 2014

Executions carried out in Ohio
Preceded by Harry Mitts Jr. September 25, 2013	Dennis McGuire; January 16, 2014	Succeeded by Ronald Phillips July 26, 2017
Executions carried out in the United States
Preceded by Michael Wilson – Oklahoma January 9, 2014	Dennis McGuire – Ohio; January 16, 2014	Succeeded by Edgar Tamayo Arias – Texas January 22, 2014
