= Edgar Tamayo Arias =

Mexican criminal (1967-2014)

- Born: July 22, 1967; Cuernavaca, Morelos, Mexico
- Died: January 22, 2014 (aged 46); Huntsville Unit, Texas, U.S.
- Status: Executed by lethal injection
- Motive: Escape custody
- Conviction: Capital murder
- Penalty: Death

Details
- Victims: 1

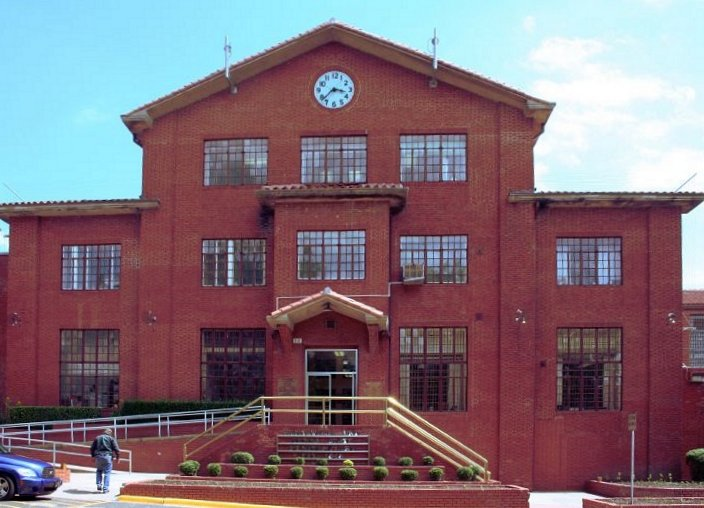
Huntsville Unit, where Tamayo was put to death

Edgar Tamayo Arias (July 22, 1967 – January 22, 2014) was a Mexican national sentenced to death in Texas for killing a police officer.

His victim, 24-year-old Houston Police Department (HPD) officer Guy P. Gaddis, was married and had served with HPD for two years.

== History ==
On January 31, 1994, Tamayo shot Gaddis outside of the Topaz nightclub in Southwest Houston. Gaddis apprehended Tamayo, who had robbed another person, after the robbery victim contacted Gaddis and told him that Tamayo and an accomplice were the perpetrators. However, Tamayo had a hidden gun and used it to kill Gaddis. The police officer had two bullets in the head and one in the neck. During the arrest police did not inform Tamayo that he could contact the Mexican consulate. The Mexican consulate was informed 5 years later.

Tamayo's attorneys were Sandra Babcock and Maurie Levin.

Tamayo was received into the Texas Department of Criminal Justice (TDCJ) system on November 18, 1994. Tamayo was initially incarcerated in the Ellis Unit, but was transferred to the Allan B. Polunsky Unit (formerly the Terrell Unit) in 1999.

John Kerry, the Secretary of State of the United States, and officials from the government of Mexico had asked for a hearing of Tamayo's case, regarding whether the lack of timely notification of the consulate affected his case, after an international court ruled in 2004 that any prisoner who had his or her rights to contact a consulate should have a hearing. The Office of the Attorney General of Texas stated that Tamayo opted not to have such a review.

Ultimately Tamayo was executed by lethal injection at Huntsville Unit in Huntsville, Texas. He was 46 at the time of his death.

== See also ==
- List of people executed in Texas, 2010–2019
- List of people executed in the United States in 2014

Executions carried out in Texas
Preceded by Jerry Duane Martin December 3, 2013	Edgar Tamayo Arias; January 22, 2014	Succeeded by Suzanne Margaret Basso February 5, 2014
Executions carried out in the United States
Preceded by Dennis B. McGuire – Ohio January 16, 2014	Edgar Tamayo Arias – Texas; January 22, 2014	Succeeded by Kenneth Eugene Hogan – Oklahoma January 23, 2014
