= The Mind of Mark DeFriest =

2014 American film directed by Gabriel London

- Directed by: Gabriel London
- Produced by: Daniel J. Chalfen; Gabriel London; Charlie Sadoff
- Starring: Mark DeFriest; Ron McAndrew; John Middleton; Bonnie DeFriest; Barbie Taylor; Robert Berland
- Cinematography: Eric Koretz; William Charles Moss; Andreas Wagner
- Edited by: Nick Clark
- Music by: Ronan Coleman
- Distributed by: Found Objects and Naked Edge Films
- Release date: April 21, 2014
- Running time: 100 min.
- Country: United States
- Language: English

The Mind of Mark DeFriest (also known as The Life and Mind of Mark DeFriest) is an American documentary film about Mark DeFriest, a man imprisoned by the State of Florida since 1980, who spent 27 of those years in solitary confinement. His original four-year sentence, for taking his father's tools after his death, before they had been released to him by the court, and then fleeing the police, has been repeatedly extended due to numerous escape attempts, seven of which were successful, and because of infractions committed while in prison.

"If I was a rapist or a murderer, they'd let me out," DeFriest says in the film. "But I'm the idiot who made them look like idiots."

== Reception ==
The film won the 2014 Best Documentary Feature award at the Lone Star Film Festival. It has a score of 82% on Metacritic.
