= Murder of Ann Harrison =

1989 murder in Missouri, United States

Ann Harrison
- Born: Ann Marie Harrison; February 22, 1974; Kansas City, Missouri, U.S.
- Died: March 22, 1989 (aged 15); Raytown, Missouri, U.S.
- Cause of death: Murder by stabbing
- Education: Raytown South High School

Ann Marie Harrison (February 22, 1974 – March 22, 1989) was a 15-year-old American girl who was kidnapped, raped, and murdered by two men in Raytown, Missouri. On March 22, 1989, Harrison was abducted from outside her home as she waited for the school bus. She was taken to a house where she was raped by her abductors before being stabbed to death in the trunk of a car. Her two killers, Michael Anthony Taylor and Roderick Nunley, were executed by the state of Missouri via lethal injection, in 2014 and 2015, respectively.

== Background ==
Ann Marie Harrison was born on February 22, 1974, in Kansas City, Missouri. She attended Raytown South High School where she was a freshman honor student.

== Murder ==
On March 22, 1989, Harrison left her home to go to school and waited for the school bus outside her house. As she waited by the mailbox, a blue '84 Monte Carlo pulled up next to her. Inside the vehicle, which was stolen, were Taylor and Nunley. One of the two men exited the vehicle and asked Harrison for directions. As the man approached her, he pulled her towards him and forced her into the front of the vehicle. The men then sped off with Harrison in the car. A girl waiting for a bus spotted the vehicle speeding past her moments later. Meanwhile, the school bus arrived at Harrison's home and sounded the horn, but no one came. The driver noticed Harrison's books, purse, and flute case had been left by the mailbox. As the bus driver waited and sounded the horn, Harrison's mother came outside to see what was happening. Figuring her daughter was still inside the house, she instructed the bus driver to move on, saying she would drive her to school. After searching the house, Harrison's mother grew concerned when there was no sign of her. She headed to a neighbor's house and then called her husband and the police.

Harrison was driven to the home of Nunley's mother. Inside the vehicle, the men blindfolded her and threatened to kill her if she continued to scream. After parking in the garage, the two men led Harrison inside and took her to the basement. Both men then took turns raping her. Afterward, the men discussed what to do with her. Not wanting to let her go because she had seen their faces, the men told her to get into the trunk of the vehicle. As Harrison pleaded with them to let her live, both men stabbed her to death with kitchen knives as she lay in the trunk of the car. They then drove the car to a quiet street and left the area in another vehicle. Later on, local media began broadcasting the news of Harrison's disappearance.

Thirty-six hours after Harrison's abduction, a neighbor reported the abandoned blue '84 Monte Carlo. When police checked the license, they learned the vehicle had been stolen. After calling the owner to collect it, he arrived and opened the trunk, discovering Harrison's body. Three months after Harrison's murder, the reward for information leading to the capture of her killers had reached $9,000. A tipster then told police about Taylor and Nunley. When they were brought in, both confessed, but each blamed the other as the instigator of the crime. However, the semen and hair matched Taylor.

== Trials ==
Both men waived trials and pleaded guilty before a judge. On May 3, 1991, the judge sentenced both men to death.

In 1993, the Supreme Court of Missouri overturned the death sentences for Nunley and Taylor without commenting or providing a reason for doing so. Both men were then retried.

On May 10, 1994, Nunley was sentenced to death for the second time. In addition, the judge sentenced him to life in prison for rape, life in prison for armed criminal action, and fifteen years for kidnapping.

On June 17, 1994, Taylor was also sentenced to death for the second time. The judge also sentenced Taylor to life in prison for rape, fifty years for armed criminal action, and fifteen years for kidnapping. The sentences were to run consecutively.

== Appeals ==
Taylor was first scheduled to be executed on February 1, 2006, but was granted a stay by the United States Court of Appeals for the Eighth Circuit, on the grounds that lethal injection in his case could be cruel and unusual punishment. Missouri asked the Supreme Court to vacate the stay, allowing the execution. Justice Samuel Alito, in his first official act on the Supreme Court, voted with the majority (6–3) to refuse Missouri's request. Alito's vote made headlines because he did not vote with Justices Antonin Scalia, Clarence Thomas and Chief Justice John Roberts, said to be the conservative wing of the court.

In 2006, Nunley was accused of attacking a manager at the Potosi Correctional Center, where he was being held. Officials said Nunley stabbed the manager in the head, collarbone, and back with a metal shard. The manager survived the attack. On August 19, 2010, it was announced that Nunley was to be executed on October 20, 2010. However, he was later granted a stay of execution by a federal judge.

== Executions ==
On February 26, 2014, Taylor was executed via lethal injection, after last minute appeals questioning the reliability of Missouri's new, unnamed supplier of the execution drug pentobarbital were turned down. He became the fourth person to be executed in Missouri in four months. Prior to his execution, Taylor wrote a letter to Harrison's parents, apologizing for his role in her murder.

On September 1, 2015, Nunley was executed, also via lethal injection, after three Supreme Court issued orders denying him a stay of execution. He was 50 years old. The appeals pending before the Court questioned the constitutionality of the death penalty, the sentencing of Nunley before a jury rather than a judge, and the secrecy of the state of Missouri in acquiring the drug used to perform the execution.

== See also ==
- List of kidnappings (1980–1989)

Executions carried out in Missouri
Preceded by Herbert L. Smulls January 29, 2014	Michael Anthony Taylor; February 26, 2014	Succeeded by Jeffrey R. Ferguson March 26, 2014
Executions carried out in the United States
Preceded by Juan Carlos Chavez – Florida February 12, 2014	Michael Anthony Taylor – Missouri; February 26, 2014	Succeeded by Paul Augustus Howell – Florida February 26, 2014
Executions carried out in Missouri
Preceded by David Stanley Zink July 14, 2015	Roderick Nunley; September 1, 2015	Succeeded by Earl Mitchell Forrest II May 11, 2016
Executions carried out in the United States
Preceded by Daniel Lee Lopez – Texas August 12, 2015	Roderick Nunley – Missouri; September 1, 2015	Succeeded by Kelly Gissendaner – Georgia September 30, 2015
