= Florida State Prison =

Prison in Bradford County, Florida, United States

Coordinates: 30°03′31″N 82°11′08″W

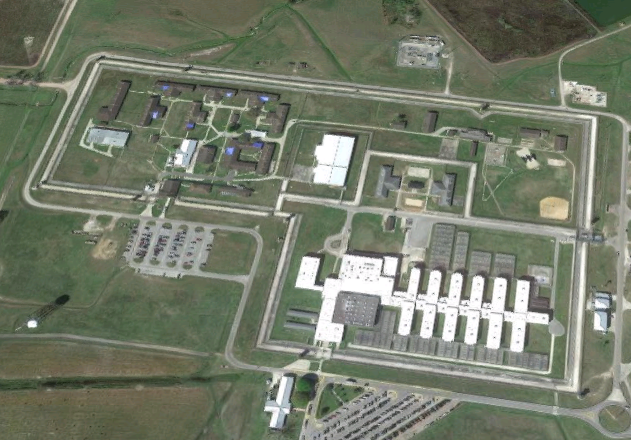
- Aerial view of FSP
- Interactive map of Florida State Prison
- Location: 23916 NW 83rd Ave. Raiford, Florida
- Status: Operational
- Security class: Minimum, medium, and close
- Capacity: 1,492
- Population: 1,253 (November 2023)
- Opened: 1961
- Former name: Florida State Prison-East Unit
- Managed by: Florida Department of Corrections
- Warden: Randall Polk

Florida State Prison (FSP) is an American correctional institution located in unincorporated Bradford County, Florida, with a Raiford postal address. Opened in 1961, FSP is a close/maximum security facility operated by the Florida Department of Corrections with a capacity of 1,492 inmates. The prison contains one of Florida’s two male death row cell blocks and the state’s execution chamber, where condemned inmates are put to death by lethal injection or electric chair if requested by the inmate.

== History ==
Florida State Prison was established as part of Florida's efforts to modernize and expand its correctional system in the mid-20th century. Construction of the facility began in 1955 as the "East Unit" of the existing prison complex near Raiford. The East Unit was built in Bradford County, across the county line from the original State Prison Farm (established in 1913), which would later become Union Correctional Institution.

The institution officially opened in 1961. The facility was designed as a maximum-security prison to house Florida's most dangerous inmates and to centralize the state's death row population. In July 1972, the East Unit was formally redesignated as Florida State Prison, while the original Raiford facility became Union Correctional Institution.

== Notable inmates ==
=== Former prisoners ===
- Grant Amato – sentenced to life without parole for the familicide murders of his father, mother and brother.
- Trayvon Newsome - sentenced to life without parole for the murder of XXXTentacion
- John Ashley – served 17 years for robbery.
- Cesar Barone – serial killer; served time for attempting to rape a guard in a previous prison.
- William Collinsworth, Ollie Stoutamire, Patrick Scarborough, and David Beagles – The four rapists of Betty Jean Owens. Scarborough died there, while two were released (one after committing a murder).
- James Blake – incarcerated for several years.
- Honey Bruce – stripper who served a year for several thefts.
- Mark DeFriest – known as the Houdini of Florida. In 1980, 19-year-old DeFriest retrieved work tools his recently deceased father had willed him before the will officially went through probate. This act was considered theft despite the fact DeFriest did not have an understanding of probate laws. DeFriest's stepmother called the police, which led to his arrest. He was sentenced to four years in prison. The original four-year sentence has since developed into 34 years for 13 escape attempts, seven of them successful, and hundreds of disciplinary reports for minor infractions. In 34 years, he's collectively spent 27 of them in solitary confinement.
- Bernard Giles – serial killer; escaped and has been transferred several times.
- Paul John Knowles – serial killer and rapist who served time prior to his murders.
- James Koedatich – serial killer; sentenced for killing his first victim and later murdered a cellmate; released in 1982.
- Forrest Lake – served 16 months for embezzlement.
- Charles Nelson – step-brother of Trapper Nelson, convicted of murder.
- Jim Nolan – sentenced on narcotics charges.
- Clyde "Bo" Pickler – father of Kellie Pickler; served 45 months for aggravated assault and battery stemming from a 2003 stabbing incident. He was released on May 6, 2006, a week after her elimination from American Idol.
- Charles Ponzi – con artist and swindler who served a year for securities fraud and released on $1,500 bond.
- Edward Surratt – murderer and possible serial killer; transferred.
- Richard Wershe Jr. – drug trafficker who served time for car theft ring charges.
- Purvis Young – artist who served three years for breaking and entering.

=== Current prisoners ===
- Tommy Zeigler - sentenced to death, then changed to life in prison, for the 1975 murders of four people in Winter Garden, Florida
- Davion Murphy - one of the Foolio 5 sentenced to life without parole for the murder of Julio Foolio.

=== Death row ===
- George Trepal – convicted and sentenced to death in February 1991 for murdering his neighbor, Peggy Jean Carr, and attempting to murder her family.

=== Died ===
- John Couey – natural causes in prison on September 30, 2009 (aged 51), died in prison before execution could be carried out.
- Jeffrey Feltner – serial killer; died of AIDS.
- Edwin Kaprat – serial killer; murdered.
- Christopher Lunz – serial killer; murder-suicide.
- Gerard Schaefer – murdered by another prisoner on December 3, 1995 (aged 49).
- Stanley Rice – serial killer; died in prison on November 3, 2007 (aged 65).
- Ottis Toole – cirrhosis in prison on September 15, 1996 (aged 49).
- Frank Valdes – stun gunned and beaten with correctional officer boots in prison on July 17, 1999 (aged 36).

== In popular culture ==
- The Mind of Mark DeFriest is a documentary film about Florida State Prison inmate Mark DeFriest.
- Lynyrd Skynyrd's song "Four Walls of Raiford" tells the story of a convict who escapes from the Florida State Prison; the convict is a veteran returning from the Vietnam War and pleads his case that he was wrongly convicted for armed robbery and asks to be buried with full honors if he gets caught.
- In Spawn: The Undead Issue #9, the story takes place in Florida State Penitentiary where a death row inmate encounters Spawn.
- It was referred to in the show Blue Bloods in Season 2 Episode 15 "The Life We Choose".
- In the 1997 Arthur Hailey novel Detective a police detective in Miami is driven in a marked cruiser for over four hours to hear the confession of a man on death row at Raiford. The book also mentions that Florida State Prison is technically not in Raiford but across the road in the town of Starke.
- In 2021, Americana/blues artist Shane Kelley released the song "Bradford County Blues" which is the story of a man locked up in Raiford.
