= Raiford, Florida =

Town in the state of Florida, United States

- Town
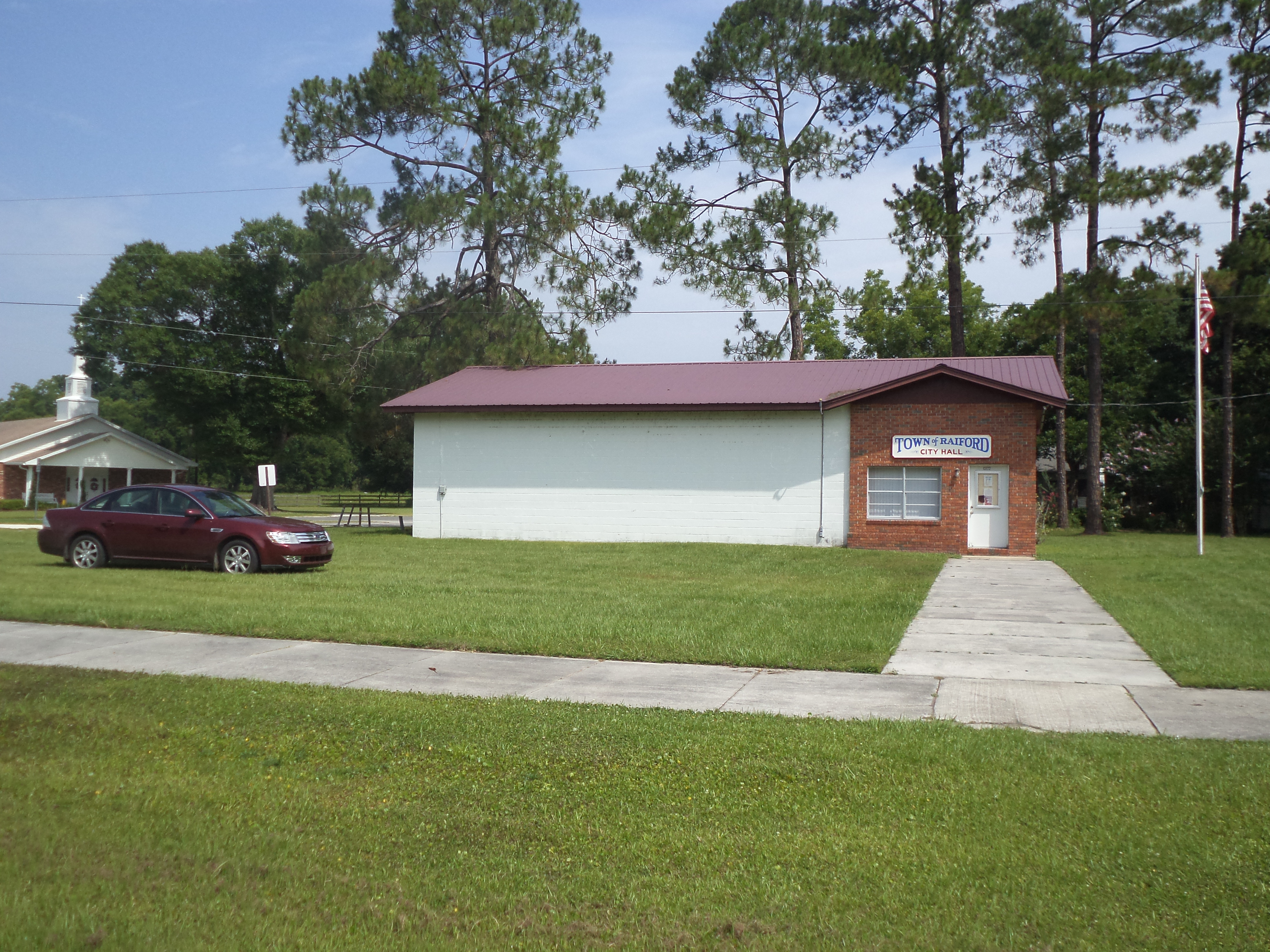
- Raiford City Hall

- Location in Union County and the state of Florida
- Coordinates: 30°03′35″N 82°14′43″W
- Country: United States
- State: Florida
- County: Union
- Settled: 1895
- Incorporated: August 1971

Government
  - Type: Mayor-Council
  - Mayor: Lamar Griffis
  - Council President: Sherry Richard
  - Councilors: Benita Griffis, Deana Rainey, and Randall Griffis Sr.
  - Town Clerk: Jackie Fautt
  - Town Attorney: Aaron Dukes

Area
  - Total: 0.54 sq mi (1.41 km^{2})
  - Land: 0.54 sq mi (1.41 km^{2})
  - Water: 0 sq mi (0.00 km^{2})
- Elevation: 128 ft (39 m)

Population (2020)
  - Total: 224
  - Density: 410.8/sq mi (158.62/km^{2})
- Time zone: UTC-5 (Eastern (EST))
  - Summer (DST): UTC-4 (EDT)
- ZIP codes: 32026, 32083
- Area code: 386
- FIPS code: 12-59400
- GNIS feature ID: 2407170

Raiford is a town in Union County, Florida, United States. There are three correctional institutions around the town. The first Florida State Prison was established in the Raiford area. Union Correctional Institution holds the state death row for men.

The town has a Masonic lodge, Raiford Lodge #82, under the jurisdiction of The Grand Lodge of Florida. The non-prisoner population was 224 at the 2020 census.

== History ==
Around 1895, the first non-indigenous person to settle the area was a man named Hunter Warren Raiford, who was a US Navy authorized uniform merchant supplier

By about 1900, the Atlantic Coast Line Railroad was built through the settlement and a post office was built with the community being named after Raiford. Hunter Warren Raiford himself would serve as the first postmaster. In 1939, the Raiford Prison baseball team set a record for consecutive scoreless innings, 52. The municipality was officially incorporated as the Town of Raiford in August 1971.

== Geography ==
According to the United States Census Bureau, the town has a total area of 0.5 square miles (1.3 km^{2}), all land.

=== Climate ===
The climate in this area is characterized by hot, humid summers and generally mild winters. According to the Köppen climate classification, the Town of Raiford has a humid subtropical climate zone (Cfa).

== Demographics ==
Historical population
Census	Pop.	Note	%±
1920	412		—
1930	460		11.7%
1980	259		—
1990	198		−23.6%
2000	187		−5.6%
2010	255		36.4%
2020	224		−12.2%
U.S. Decennial Census

=== 2010 and 2020 census ===
Raiford racial composition (Hispanics excluded from racial categories) (NH = Non-Hispanic)
Race	Pop 2010	Pop 2020	% 2010	% 2020
White (NH)	204	177	80.00%	79.02%
Black or African American (NH)	35	26	13.73%	11.61%
Native American or Alaska Native (NH)	3	0	1.18%	0.00%
Asian (NH)	4	1	1.57%	0.45%
Pacific Islander or Native Hawaiian (NH)	0	0	0.00%	0.00%
Some other race (NH)	0	2	0.00%	0.89%
Two or more races/Multiracial (NH)	2	10	0.78%	4.46%
Hispanic or Latino (any race)	7	8	2.75%	3.57%
Total	255	224		

As of the 2020 United States census, there were 224 people, 85 households, and 72 families residing in the town.

As of the 2010 United States census, there were 255 people, 40 households, and 27 families residing in the town.

=== 2000 census ===
As of the census of 2000, there were 187 people, 68 households, and 48 families residing in the town. The population density was 356.7 inhabitants per square mile (137.7/km^{2}). There were 76 housing units at an average density of 145.0 units per square mile (56.0 units/km^{2}). The racial makeup of the town was 83.42% White, 14.97% African American, 1.07% Native American, and 0.53% from two or more races.

In 2000, there were 68 households, out of which 26.5% had children under the age of 18 living with them, 57.4% were married couples living together, 7.4% had a female householder with no husband present, and 29.4% were non-families. 29.4% of all households were made up of individuals, and 14.7% had someone living alone who was 65 years of age or older. The average household size was 2.75 and the average family size was 3.46.

In 2000, in the town, the population was spread out, with 31.6% under the age of 18, 5.9% from 18 to 24, 26.7% from 25 to 44, 22.5% from 45 to 64, and 13.4% who were 65 years of age or older. The median age was 33 years. For every 100 females, there were 83.3 males. For every 100 females age 18 and over, there were 88.2 males.

In 2000, the median income for a household in the town was $18,747 and the median income for a family was $22,000. Males had a median income of $12,708 versus $10,250 for females. The per capita income for the town was $14,684. About 68.0% of families and 88.4% of the population were below the poverty line, including 82.00% of those under the age of 18 and 22.00% of those 65 or over making it the poorest town in the poorest county in the country.

== Correctional institutions ==
The Raiford area includes Union Correctional Institution (UCI) in unincorporated Union County, as well as Florida State Prison (FSP), right across the Bradford County line, the two institutions having originally been one. UCI was the state's first prison, and was originally called "Florida State Prison". The name went with the newer institution when the two were split. Both institutions house inmates in death row facilities. FSP conducts all executions, while most death row inmates are housed at UCI.

UCI has the most diverse population of any correctional institution in the state. It houses 'close management inmates' and 'psych inmates' as well as 'open population' inmates. Most of the latter are age fifty and over.

FSP houses the violent and criminally insane in solitary confinement. The men on death row are also in solitary.

The penitentiary compound encompasses over fifty acres (200,000 m^{2}) and includes a farm where much food is grown that feeds inmates.

Nearby are the state's training facilities for Correctional Officers (COs), some housing for COs, and the warden's house.

Convicted serial killer Ted Bundy was held at Raiford for years and executed there in 1989.

== Education ==
The school district is the Union County School District, which covers all of Union County.
