= Eric Darnell Holmes =

American convicted murderer (born 1968)

- Born: August 23, 1968 (age 58); Chicago, Illinois, U.S.
- Status: Incarcerated on death row
- Motive: Robbery, revenge
- Convictions: Murder (2 counts); Attempted murder (1 count); Robbery
- Penalty: Death (March 26, 1993)

Details
- Date: November 16, 1989
- State: Indiana
- Location: Castleton, Indianapolis
- Killed: Theresa Blosl, 20; Charles Ervin, 30
- Injured: Amy Foshee, 19
- Weapon: Knife
- Imprisoned at: Indiana State Prison

Eric Darnell Holmes (born August 23, 1968) is an American convicted murderer sentenced to death in Indiana for the 1989 murders of Charles Ervin and Theresa Blosl. On November 16, 1989, after he was fired from his job at Shoney's Restaurant in Marion County, Indiana, Holmes and an accomplice Michael Vance committed an armed robbery at his former workplace and attacked his three ex-colleagues (Amy Foshee, Charles Ervin and Theresa Blosl), and the duo also stabbed the victims. Foshee survived, while both Blosl and Ervin died from the stabbing. Holmes and Vance were both arrested and charged with the double murder. Vance was sentenced to 190 years in prison while Holmes was sentenced to death for one of two murder counts. Holmes is currently on death row awaiting execution, and he is presently the longest-serving death row prisoner in Indiana.

== Personal life ==
Born on August 23, 1968, Eric Darnell Holmes grew up in the rural housing projects of Chicago, Illinois. According to sources, Holmes's parents were neglectful and abusive towards their children. Holmes's father, who was purportedly a gangster, was often absent from his family's life and when Holmes was seven years old, his mother died, leaving him and his brothers and sisters to be raised by their grandmother, who later relocated them to Indianapolis, Indiana. However, both Holmes's grandmother and her live-in boyfriend had abused Holmes, who was regularly being whipped by his grandmother. In school, Holmes was said to be a slow learner and he was thus enrolled in special education classes for ten years, although this was a result of Holmes's grandmother giving the wrong date of her grandson's birth to the school authorities.

== 1989 Shoney's Restaurant murders ==
On November 16, 1989, 21-year-old Eric Darnell Holmes, who was fired from his job at a local Shoney's Restaurant in Castleton, Indianapolis, would commit a robbery at his former workplace, which resulted in the deaths of his two former co-workers.

Prior to the double murder, Holmes got into an argument with one of his colleagues, 19-year-old Amy Foshee. Subsequently, after Foshee filed a complaint saying that Holmes had sexually harassed her, Holmes was fired from his job, thus ending his three-month employment at the restaurant. Out of vengeance, Holmes and an accomplice, Michael Vance, armed themselves with knives and headed to the restaurant. Vance's brother Raymond, who also worked at the restaurant, accompanied them but he stayed in the car while both Vance and Holmes left the car.

Upon gaining entry into the premises, both Holmes and Vance held three of the restaurant's workers at knifepoint, just as the trio were about to leave after finishing their work for the day. The three victims, Amy Foshee, 30-year-old Charles Ervin and 20-year-old Theresa Blosl, were being robbed of the till that Ervin carried with him and both Holmes and Vance wielded the knives to stab the trio multiple times. Foshee was the sole survivor of the stabbing; both Blosl and Ervin were mortally wounded and died due to their wounds.

Foshee was able to contact the Marion County Sheriff's Department despite the critical injuries she sustained, and before she underwent surgery at Methodist Hospital, she helped police to identify the attackers responsible for the robbery-murder. Within hours after the double murder, the police arrested both Holmes and Vance, and according to Marion County sheriff's Lt. Joie K. Davis, the motive of the attack were both robbery and revenge, and he labelled the crime as "uncommonly brutal" and "particularly vicious".

== Murder trial ==
On November 16, 1989, the Vance brothers and Eric Holmes were charged with two counts of murder and one count each of attempted murder, robbery and confinement. On January 31, 1990, the prosecution officially sought the death penalty for both Holmes and Michael Vance. As for Raymond Vance, he was only charged with robbery but not murder; the preliminary charges of murder were no longer pursued in his case.

Before Holmes was put on trial, the Vance brothers were already convicted of their respective roles in the double murder. Raymond Vance, who was in the car with Holmes and Michael Vance, pleaded guilty to reduced charges of assisting a criminal, and was set to be sentenced at the end of Holmes's trial. Michael Vance, the other brother who stabbed the victims, was found guilty of both counts of murder on March 1, 1991, and although the prosecution sought the death penalty, the jury did not recommend the death sentence for Vance, who was thus sentenced to 190 years' imprisonment on March 28, 1991.

On October 9, 1992, nearly three years after the 1989 Shoney's Restaurant murders, it was reported that Eric Holmes's trial was scheduled for November 4, 1992. A month later, the trial of Eric Holmes began as scheduled on November 4, 1992, making him the final defendant to stand trial.

During the trial, forensic pathologist Dr. Dean Hawley testified that there were a total of eight wounds on Ervin's body, and one of which had penetrated the neck from one side to another, which was in the ordinary course of nature to cause death. Roger W. Perry, a psychologist, testified for the defence and stated that Holmes had "brief reactive psychosis," a disorder that can impair the ability to think and reason clearly. In the middle of the trial, the trial judge ordered a recess to re-examine the blood stain evidence extracted from Holmes's shoe.

On November 28, 1992, the jury found Holmes guilty of both the murders of Theresa Blosl and Charles Ervin.

After Holmes's conviction, the jury deliberated on whether to impose the death penalty for Holmes. On December 3, 1992, the jury deadlocked on the death penalty for Holmes, and as a result, the sentencing was left to the judge to decide, and the jury was dismissed in the end.

During the sentencing phase, Chief Deputy Prosecutor David Milton sought the death penalty, stating that after murdering the two victims, Holmes and his accomplice gave each other "high fives" and called themselves ruthless, while the defence argued that Holmes had a troubled childhood and was a victim of abuse and hence opposed the death penalty. The families of Ervin and Blosl were allowed to give victim impact statements, and they all urged the court and jury to sentence Holmes to death, and additionally rejected Holmes's apology. Ervin's sister, who wanted the death penalty, stated in response to Holmes's apology, "The only reason he's (Holmes) saying what he said is because he's sitting up there facing what he's facing." Blosl's widower also stated that his son would have to grow up without a mother. Foshee, the sole survivor of the attack, also gave her victim impact statement, stating that she lost her trust in people, slept with a gun next to her bed and became prejudiced against African-American people (Holmes was also of African-American descent) due to her trauma from the attack.

On March 26, 1993, Holmes was formally sentenced to death via the electric chair by Marion County Superior Court Judge Cynthia Emkes. During sentencing, Judge Emkes cited that the death penalty was justified due to Holmes "was of such a character and attitude" to commit the murder of Blosl right after he killed Ervin in cold blood and endure the notion of committing both murders back-to-back. The death sentence was imposed only for the murder of Blosl, while for the other count of murdering Ervin and remaining charges of attempted murder and robbery, Holmes was given an additional 160 years' imprisonment. Judge Emkes signed a death warrant to authorize an execution date for Holmes, but she stayed the execution pending possible appeals from the defendant.

Two weeks after Holmes was condemned to death row, Michael Vance's brother, Raymond Vance was sentenced to five years' jail, including a suspended three-year term. Raymond's sentence was to run consecutively with the six years he received for an unrelated charge of child molestation.

== Appeals ==
On August 7, 1996, Eric Holmes's direct appeal was denied by the Indiana Supreme Court.

On July 28, 1998, Marion Superior Court Judge Tanya Walton Pratt overturned Holmes's death sentence on the grounds of prosecutorial misconduct. On May 19, 2000, the Indiana Supreme Court restored the death sentence of Holmes finding that the error committed by the prosecution was not significant enough to invalidate Holmes's death sentence.

On January 7, 2005, Holmes's third appeal was denied by the Indiana Supreme Court.

On October 30, 2007, the 7th Circuit Court of Appeals heard Holmes's appeal and remanded his case for another hearing regarding his mental competency.

On March 22, 2016, Holmes's appeal was rejected by the 7th Circuit Court of Appeals.

On January 23, 2017, the U.S. Supreme Court denied Holmes's final petition for a writ of certiorari.

By 2022, Holmes had exhausted all his appeals against his death sentence.

== Death row ==
After he was sentenced to death, Eric Holmes was incarcerated on death row at the Indiana State Prison. As of 1999, three years after Holmes's sentencing, 45 death row inmates (including Holmes) were held on death row at Indiana State Prison. By January 2014, Holmes was one of the 11 death row inmates awaiting execution in Indiana, and the number fell to eight by July 2020, with Holmes still on the death row list.

By 2019, 30 years after the 1989 Shoney's Restaurant double murder, Holmes had become the longest-serving inmate on Indiana's death row. Theresa Blosl's son, who was only five months old at the time of his mother's murder, told The Indianapolis Star that he could barely remember the sound of his mother's voice and he only heard stories about his mother from the people who knew her. Blosl's son also stated that for these past 30 years, he waited for the execution of his mother's killer and hoped for closure. However, at that time, a moratorium was placed on all pending executions (including Holmes's) in Indiana due to the state's inability to procure drugs to carry out these death sentences by lethal injection, the state's sole method of execution.

On June 26, 2024, Attorney General Todd Rokita announced that the state had petitioned for an execution date for convicted mass murderer Joseph Corcoran, after they procured the drugs required for lethal injection executions, giving rise to the possibility of resuming executions in Indiana. Of all the eight inmates remaining on death row in Indiana that month itself, four of them, including Holmes, had already exhausted their appeals against their respective death sentences and eligible for an execution date. Subsequently, Corcoran was put to death by lethal injection on December 18, 2024, hence ending the state's 15-year moratorium on executions.

In May and October 2025 respectively, the state of Indiana carried out two additional executions: convicted cop killer Benjamin Ritchie and rapist-killer Roy Lee Ward. Following these executions, only Holmes and four other inmates remained on Indiana's death row. Holmes was the sole prisoner who had exhausted all available avenues of appeal against his death sentence.

As of 2026, Eric Darnell Holmes remains imprisoned on death row awaiting execution.

== See also ==
- Capital punishment in Indiana
- List of death row inmates in the United States § Indiana
