= Murder of Alyssa and Caleb Lynch =

2010 child murder and arson case in Indiana

Murders of Alyssa and Caleb Lynch
- Location: Evansville, Indiana, US
- Date: April 9, 2010
- Attack type: Murder by arson
- Deaths: Alyssa Lynch, 8 Caleb Lynch, 5
- Perpetrator: Jeffrey Allen Weisheit
- Verdict: Guilty on all counts
- Convictions: Murder (2 counts); Arson
- Sentence: Death

On April 9, 2010, Jeffrey Allen Weisheit (March 28, 1976 – November 5, 2026) set fire to his girlfriend's house in Evansville, Indiana, United States, leading to the deaths of her two children, Alyssa and Caleb Lynch, aged eight and five, respectively. They died from smoke and soot inhalation, and were found gagged and tied up inside the house. Weisheit, who fled Indiana after the crime, was arrested in Kentucky and charged with double murder. He was found guilty and sentenced to death in 2013. He was executed by lethal injection on November 5, 2026.

== Murder ==
In the early morning hours of April 10, 2010, the German Township Fire Department received a report that a fire had broken out at one of the houses in Evansville, Indiana. The firefighters arrived at the house thereafter and put out the fire. Inside the residence, the police found the dead bodies of a young girl and boy.

The children were identified as five-year-old Caleb Lynch and eight-year-old Alyssa Lynch. Caleb was found hog-tied on a mattress and his mouth was stuffed with a washcloth and covered with duct tape. A railroad flare was stuffed in his underwear and another flare was found underneath his body. Alyssa was found inside a closet, presumably trapped inside or trying to hide from the fire. About 90% of her body was charred black from the fire, and autopsy results showed that the children died as a result of smoke inhalation, and they were still alive when the fire started. The house belonged to 34-year-old Jeffrey Allen Weisheit, who was the boyfriend of the Lynch children's mother. The Lynch children and their mother, who was pregnant with Weisheit's child, had lived with Weisheit in the house since 2008.

Weisheit was determined to be responsible for starting the fire. Weisheit said he was angry at Caleb for his disobedience and refusal to go to bed, and he stuffed a washcloth inside Caleb's mouth before he used duct tape to seal the boy's mouth and tie his hands behind his back. Weisheit stuffed a flare stick in Caleb's underwear and placed another under his body, before he ignited them, which resulted in the fire that killed Caleb and Alyssa. Weisheit escaped from the house, having packed his clothes and some of his girlfriend's belongings. Weisheit had resigned from his job and had withdrawn all of the money in his bank account, and he had expressed apparent unhappiness towards the children's mother due to his suspicion that she was pregnant with another man's child.

After murdering the Lynch siblings, Weisheit fled by car to Northern Kentucky on that day, and he was caught speeding on Interstate 75 by two Boone County sheriff's deputies, and the deputies gave chase while trying to stop him. The pursuit ended in Covington, and Weisheit swerved and attempted to hit the officers, then tried to charge at them with a knife. He was arrested after the officers tased and subdued him.

== Trial of Jeffrey Weisheit ==
=== Charges ===
On April 13, 2010, Weisheit was extradited back to Indiana, where he was charged with two counts of murder, and he was detained at the Vanderburgh County Confinement Center.

On April 27, 2010, Weisheit was scheduled to stand trial on April 4, 2011, at the Vanderburgh County Court, and the Vanderburgh County Prosecutor's Office planned to seek the death penalty against him.

In August 2010, the trial venue was changed to Clark County, Indiana. The trial date of April 2011 was subsequently delayed. In March 2012, the trial date was rescheduled for August 6, 2012. In December 2012, a new trial date of June 3, 2013, was set for Weisheit's case.

=== Trial process and conviction ===
On June 3, 2013, Weisheit stood trial for the murders of the Lynch children, and jury selection started on the first day. The selection phase lasted for five days.

The opening arguments were made on June 11, 2013. The prosecution called the two Vanderburgh County sheriff's deputies who first responded to the crime scene and discovered the bodies of the children.

Halfway through the trial, the defense requested that the judge declare a mistrial, because one of the jurors was replaced after receiving a note from a relative during the proceedings. The judge denied the motion.

On June 18, 2013, Weisheit was found guilty of two counts of murder and one count of arson.

=== Death sentence ===
A sentencing trial was conducted after the jury's guilty verdict. During the hearing, the defense called Weisheit's childhood friends and psychiatric experts to testify, and according to Drs. David Price and Heather Henderson-Galligan, Weisheit was diagnosed with depression, bipolar disorder and also suffered from possible brain damage. This testimony formed the basis of the defense's request for life without parole. However, the prosecution sought the death penalty, and also summoned a psychiatric expert, Dr. Hal Corwin, to rebut the defense's evidence.

On June 21, 2013, the jury recommended the death penalty. A formal sentencing date of July 11, 2013, was scheduled. On July 11, 2013, Weisheit was formally sentenced to death by Clark County Judge Daniel Moore. Judge Moore remarked that the defendant had "defied any level of decency" and carried out the murders of Caleb and Alyssa Lynch with a "cold and depraved heart". Weisheit became the 13th prisoner to be condemned to Indiana's death row, and he was transferred to the Indiana State Prison.

In response to Weisheit's death sentence, Chief Deputy Prosecutor Gary Shutte stated that Weisheit had ample opportunity to avoid the death penalty by accepting a plea deal previously proposed by the prosecution in exchange for taking the death penalty off the table, but he chose to not do so and instead headed for trial and received the death sentence. According to Shutte, it was his first case where the defendant was actually sentenced to death before a jury and judge.

== Appeals ==
On February 18, 2015, the Indiana Supreme Court rejected Weisheit's direct appeal against his death sentence and murder conviction.

On September 7, 2017, Weisheit filed a second appeal to the Indiana Supreme Court. On November 7, 2018, Weisheit's appeal was rejected by the Indiana Supreme Court.

On June 24, 2019, the U.S. Supreme Court denied Weisheit's appeal.

On September 7, 2023, Weisheit's federal appeal was dismissed by Judge Sarah Evans Baker of the United States District Court for the Southern District of Indiana. On August 13, 2025, the 7th Circuit Court of Appeals turned down Weisheit's appeal against his death sentence. On June 8, 2026, the U.S. Supreme Court denied Weisheit's final petition for a writ of certiorari.

== Death row and execution ==
By January 2014, Weisheit was one of the 11 inmates remaining on Indiana's death row. As of July 2020, Weisheit was one of eight death row prisoners awaiting execution in Indiana.

One of Indiana's eight condemned inmates, convicted mass murderer Joseph Corcoran, was put to death by lethal injection on December 18, 2024, marking Indiana's first execution in 15 years after the state's informal moratorium on capital punishment due to the difficulty of procuring lethal injection drugs. Corcoran's execution left seven inmates remaining on the state's death row.

In May 2025, Benjamin Ritchie was executed for the 2001 murder of a police officer, leaving Weisheit and five more inmates left on death row. After the October 2025 execution of Roy Lee Ward for the 2001 murder of Stacy Payne, only five prisoners, including Weisheit, remained on Indiana's death row that same month.

=== Death warrant ===
On June 17, 2026, the Indiana Attorney General Todd Rokita filed a motion seeking an execution date for Weisheit.

In response to the Indiana Attorney General's motion, Weisheit filed an appeal seeking to extend the time period by 15 days for him to file a response to the state's application for his death warrant. However, on June 29, 2026, the request was denied. The defense filed their written response on August 6, 2026, stating that Weisheit should not be executed due to ineffective counsel, his childhood head injuries and the concerns over the lethal injection drugs.

On August 28, 2026, the Indiana Supreme Court signed Weisheit's death warrant and scheduled an execution date of November 5, 2026.

=== Clemency hearing ===
On September 15, 2026, the Indiana Parole Board scheduled a clemency hearing for Weisheit on October 16, 2026.

On October 13, 2026, three days before his clemency hearing, Weisheit filed an appeal to the Indiana Supreme Court and asked for a stay of execution. The court denied Weisheit's request on October 22, 2026.

On the date of his clemency hearing before the state parole board, Weisheit made his plea to the board to recommend clemency and commute his death sentence to life imprisonment. Under Indiana law, the board would decide whether or not to recommend clemency, but it was a non-binding decision and it was up to the governor to either adhere or depart from the board's recommendation. The father of the Lynch children had earlier on expressed his support for clemency and stated he had forgiven Weisheit for killing his children. Weisheit's former girlfriend and mother of the children urged the board to refuse Weisheit's clemency petition, stating that her children deserved to live and Weisheit deprived them of their lives and futures, and she found it a struggle to live without her children ever since their deaths. On October 28, 2026, the state parole board unanimously recommended that Weisheit be denied clemency. On November 2, 2026, Governor Mike Braun chose to not grant clemency after accepting the board's recommendation.

On November 4, 2026, Weisheit's final appeal was denied by the Indiana Supreme Court.

=== Execution ===
On November 5, 2026, Weisheit was put to death by lethal injection at the Indiana State Prison. Prior to his execution, Weisheit ate a last meal of barbecued ribs and Mountain Dew from Texas Corral. He was pronounced dead at 12:45 am. Weisheit did not make a final statement before his execution.

== See also ==
- Capital punishment in Indiana
- List of most recent executions by jurisdiction
- List of murdered American children
- List of people executed in Indiana
- List of people executed in the United States in 2026

Executions carried out in Indiana
Preceded by Roy Lee Ward October 10, 2025	Jeffrey Allen Weisheit; November 5, 2026	Succeeded by most recent
Executions carried out in the United States
Preceded by William Reaves Jr. – Florida October 20, 2026	Jeffrey Allen Weisheit – Indiana; November 5, 2026	Succeeded by Jesse Guardado – Florida November 5, 2026
