= Gilligan family murders =

1980 family murder case in Indiana, U.S.

- Location: Vanderburgh County, Indiana, U.S.
- Date: January 14, 1980
- Attack type: Murder; Burglary
- Weapon: Handgun
- Deaths: Patrick Gilligan, 30; Teresa Gilligan, 30; Lisa Gilligan, 5; Gregory Gilligan, 4
- Perpetrator: Donald Ray Wallace Jr.

The Gilligan family murders occurred in Evansville, Indiana, United States, on January 14, 1980, when Donald Ray Wallace Jr. (September 3, 1957 – March 10, 2005) burglarized the Gilligan residence from where he encountered and murdered Patrick and Teresa Gilligan along with their two young children.

Wallace was arrested the following day after investigators connected him to property stolen from the Gilligan residence and a neighboring home. Additional evidence included blood found on Wallace's clothing, witness testimony, and statements he allegedly made to acquaintances following the killings. Following extended proceedings concerning his competency to stand trial, Wallace was convicted of four counts of murder in September 1982 and sentenced to death. Wallace was executed by lethal injection on March 10, 2005.

== Murders ==
On January 14, 1980, Wallace burglarized the residence of Ralph Hendricks. After completing the burglary, Wallace entered the neighboring home of Patrick and Theresa Gilligan, who lived there with their two children, Lisa and Gregory. The Gilligans returned home while Wallace was inside the residence. According to evidence, Patrick encountered Wallace after entering the house from the garage, and a struggle followed. Wallace gained control of the family and restrained them. Theresa's hands were tied behind her back, while Lisa and Gregory were tied together.

Wallace subsequently shot all four members of the family. Vanderburgh County coroner David Wilson determined that each victim died from brain injuries caused by gunshot wounds. Reports described the killings as an apparent burglary that escalated after the family returned home. Wallace removed several items from the Gilligan residence, including firearms, jewelry, a citizens-band radio and a police scanner. Much of the stolen property was subsequently recovered from Wallace or traced to people with whom he associated following the killings.

The bodies were discovered during the investigation of the burglary at the neighboring Hendricks residence. Indiana State Trooper Thomas Snyder had been dispatched to investigate that burglary and went to the Gilligan home to determine whether its occupants had witnessed anything unusual. After noticing broken glass in a rear door, Snyder entered the residence and discovered Patrick, Theresa, Lisa and Gregory in the family room. Theresa remained bound, and the two children were still tied together. Wallace was arrested on January 15 while hiding in the attic of an acquaintance's residence and was held on four preliminary counts of murder.

The murders remained one of the most widely publicized criminal cases in the Evansville area. Twenty-five years later, relatives of the Gilligans said that continuing coverage of Wallace had often overshadowed the four victims. Before Wallace's execution in 2005, members of the family organized a memorial service at St. Theresa Catholic Church.

== Competency hearings ==
The first competency hearing was held on May 16, 1980. Psychiatrists Larry Davis and John Kooiker testified that Wallace had described a series of elaborate delusions, including claims that the CIA, Freemasons and other groups were conspiring against him. He also expressed suspicions about his attorneys, court personnel and the psychiatrists examining him, and claimed that listening devices had been placed in his jail cell and interview room. The psychiatrists concluded that he was unable to adequately understand the proceedings or assist his attorneys and stated that his symptoms would have been difficult to fabricate. Prosecutors presented testimony from a jail inmate and a sheriff's department employee who said that Wallace displayed apparently psychotic behavior selectively, raising the possibility that he was feigning mental illness. Despite this testimony, the court found the psychiatric evidence more persuasive and ruled Wallace incompetent to stand trial on May 19. He was subsequently committed to the Indiana Department of Mental Health and admitted to Logansport State Hospital, where he received psychiatric treatment, including antipsychotic medication.

A second competency hearing was held on September 2, 1980. By that time Wallace had undergone several months of treatment with Thorazine, and Davis and Kooiker believed that he had become oriented as to time, place and person and was capable of standing trial. During the hearing, however, Wallace appeared heavily sedated. The psychiatrists testified that his medication could be adjusted to maintain his competency while reducing its sedative effects. The court therefore declined to immediately proceed to trial and ordered further hospitalization and adjustment of his medication.

A third competency hearing was held on January 16, 1981. Davis, Kooiker and a third psychiatrist, Dr. Moore, testified that Wallace was again displaying symptoms associated with schizophrenia and that the modified treatment proposed after the previous hearing had been unsuccessful. Although one psychiatrist described Wallace as a chronic liar, the physicians generally did not believe that he was fabricating his psychiatric symptoms. Moore testified that if Wallace were malingering, he was an exceptionally convincing actor. The court again found Wallace incompetent to stand trial on January 17.

On May 3, 1982, prosecutors filed a motion requesting another determination of Wallace's competency, asserting that they had evidence indicating that he had been feigning psychosis. The fourth hearing began on June 16. Unlike the earlier hearings, the prosecution presented extensive testimony from people who had observed Wallace over extended periods, together with letters he had written while incarcerated. On June 28, 1982, the court formally ruled that Wallace was competent to understand the proceedings and assist his attorneys, clearing the case to proceed to trial.

== Trial ==
1977 police photo of Wallace

Donald Ray Wallace Jr. was charged in Vanderburgh County, Indiana, with four counts of murder in connection with the deaths of Patrick and Teresa Gilligan and their children, five-year-old Lisa and four-year-old Gregory. Prosecutors also filed a request for the death penalty, alleging as statutory aggravating circumstances that the killings were committed intentionally during the commission of a burglary and that Wallace had murdered more than one person. Following a change of venue, the case was transferred from Vanderburgh County to the Vigo Circuit Court in Terre Haute, where Judge Hugh D. McQuillan presided.

The beginning of Wallace's trial was delayed for more than two years by questions concerning his competency to stand trial. Wallace officially stood trial on August 31, 1982. Testimony began on September 9, 1982. The prosecution's case relied on physical evidence, property taken from the Gilligan residence, and testimony from several people who said Wallace made incriminating statements following the killings. Investigators recovered fragments of glass near the remains of a jacket that Wallace had allegedly burned shortly after the murders; an Indiana State Police specialist testified that the fragments corresponded with the broken window through which entry had been gained to the Gilligan home.

Among the prosecution witnesses were Mark Boyles and Anita Hoeche, who testified that Wallace contacted them the day after the killings and asked for a ride. According to their testimony, Wallace told them that he had become "too greedy" while burglarizing homes and had been confronted by a family after entering a second residence. The Indiana Supreme Court later summarized their testimony as including statements by Wallace concerning his decision to restrain and kill the occupants. Durham similarly testified that Wallace arrived at her residence on the evening of the murders, changed his clothes and described shooting the occupants after being surprised during the burglary.

Richard Milligan, an acquaintance of Wallace who had participated with him in previous burglaries, testified about a method Wallace had allegedly used to enter houses by placing masking tape over window glass before breaking it in order to reduce noise. Investigators found that entry into both the Gilligan residence and the neighboring Hendricks residence had been accomplished in a similar manner. Milligan's competency as a witness was challenged by the defense because of his history of paranoid schizophrenia, but McQuillan permitted him to testify after conducting a hearing outside the presence of the jury.

The defense, led by attorney William G. Smock, challenged the reliability of the prosecution's witnesses and emphasized the largely circumstantial nature of the physical evidence. During the defense case, testimony was introduced concerning a pair of Isotoner gloves found after the murders in an effort to suggest that Wallace had been wearing those gloves while burglarizing the neighboring residence and that another person might therefore have been responsible for the bloodstained gloves recovered at the murder scene. In rebuttal, Teresa Gilligan's mother, Dorothy Sahm, identified the Isotoner gloves as belonging to her daughter and testified that Teresa had been wearing them on the night she was killed.

Near the end of the trial, defense attorneys attempted to introduce letters allegedly written by Durham to Indiana Reformatory inmate Gerald Bivens. Bivens claimed that the letters would undermine Durham's testimony and suggested that Wallace was being made the "fall guy" for the crimes. Judge McQuillan ordered Bivens transported by state police helicopter back to the reformatory in an attempt to obtain the letters. Prison officials and a deputy sheriff were unable to locate them, however, and McQuillan refused a defense request for an additional delay. The episode postponed closing arguments by approximately one day.

During closing arguments, Smock maintained that the state's case depended on circumstantial evidence and witnesses who had received or expected favorable treatment from prosecutors. He noted that some prosecution witnesses faced charges ranging from drug possession to assisting a criminal. Prosecutors Stanley M. Levco and Robert J. Pigman argued that the physical evidence, stolen property, and Wallace's statements to acquaintances established his responsibility for all four killings. On September 22, 1982, after approximately 90 minutes of deliberation, the jury found Wallace guilty on all four counts of murder. Wallace reportedly showed little emotion as the verdicts were announced.

A separate penalty proceeding was held following the convictions. Prosecutors argued that two statutory aggravating circumstances justified capital punishment: that Wallace had intentionally killed the Gilligans while committing a burglary and that he had committed multiple murders. Smock urged the jury to spare Wallace's life, citing religious passages and the Indiana Constitution's reference to reformation rather than vindictive justice. After approximately two and a half hours of deliberation on September 23, the jury unanimously recommended that Wallace receive the death penalty.

On October 21, 1982, McQuillan accepted the jury's recommendation and sentenced Wallace to death by the electric chair. In his written findings, McQuillan concluded that the state had proven beyond a reasonable doubt both the burglary-murder and multiple-murder aggravating circumstances and that they outweighed the mitigating circumstances presented on Wallace's behalf.

== Appeals ==
Wallace was originally scheduled to be executed on January 14, 1983, but was granted a stay of execution on December 14, 1982.

Wallace raised several claims concerning his competency, evidentiary rulings, jury proceedings, the search of the vehicle he had used, the presentence report, and the constitutionality of Indiana's death penalty statute. The Indiana Supreme Court rejected the claims and affirmed the convictions and sentence on December 6, 1985. A rehearing was denied on March 3, 1986. Wallace was rescheduled to be executed on June 24, 1986. On May 29, 1986, his execution was stayed again pending appeal. On June 30, 1986, Wallace was denied certiorari by the U.S Supreme Court. Wallace was rescheduled again to be executed on January 14, 1987. His execution was stayed on December 23, 1986.

On December 3, 1986, Wallace petitioned for post-conviction relief. His appeal was denied on September 4, 1987. The Indiana Supreme Court affirmed the trial courts decision on April 17, 1990. In 1991, Wallace was denied certiorari.

Wallace was again rescheduled to be executed on January 14, 1988. The Indiana Supreme Court stayed his execution on December 9, 1987.

On September 1, 1992, Wallace filed a second petition for post-conviction relief. On January 4, 1993, Wallace's conviction was affirmed a third time. His appeal was denied and affirmed again on September 28, 1994. A rehearing was denied again on December 14, 1994. On May 5, 1995, Wallace was denied certiorari again. On September 6, 1995, Wallace appealed to U.S. District Court for the Southern District of Indiana.

On November 14, 2002, the U.S. District Court for the Southern District of Indiana denied Wallace's habeas corpus petition. A request for a new trial was denied on November 16, 2002.

On March 27, 2004, United States Court of Appeals for the Seventh Circuit affirmed the district courts decision for denial of relief. Wallace argued, among other claims, that his death sentence had been improperly influenced by earlier criminal convictions that were later overturned. The court concluded that the valid statutory aggravating circumstances supporting the death sentence were independent of those convictions. On June 28, 2004, the Seventh Circuit Court of Appeals denied a panel rehearing and rehearing en banc. On November 29, 2004, the U.S. Supreme Court denied certiorari a final time.

Wallace requested permission from the Indiana Supreme Court to pursue another successive petition for post-conviction relief. On January 13, 2005, Wallace's final appeal was denied. It concluded that Wallace had not demonstrated a reasonable possibility that he was entitled to additional post-conviction relief.

== Execution ==
After exhausting all his appeals, Wallace declined to seek clemency from then Indiana governor Mitch Daniels.

On March 10, 2005, 47-year-old Wallace was put to death by lethal injection at the Indiana State Prison. The execution commenced shortly after midnight and Wallace was pronounced dead at 12:23 a.m. Prior to his execution, Wallace ate a last meal of filet mignon, baked potato, soup, and cake. His final words were "I hope everyone can find peace with this." He was Indiana's first execution in 2005.

== See also ==
- Capital punishment in Indiana
- List of people executed in Indiana
- List of people executed in the United States in 2005

Executions carried out in Indiana
Preceded by Joseph L. Trueblood June 13, 2003	Donald Ray Wallace Jr. March 10, 2005	Succeeded by William J. Benefiel Jr. April 21, 2005
Executions carried out in the United States
Preceded by George Anderson Hopper – Texas March 8, 2005	Donald Ray Wallace Jr. – Indiana; March 10, 2005	Succeeded by William Dillard Powell – North Carolina March 11, 2005
