= 1916 Hammond superior court house shooting =

Attempted murder in Indiana, U.S.

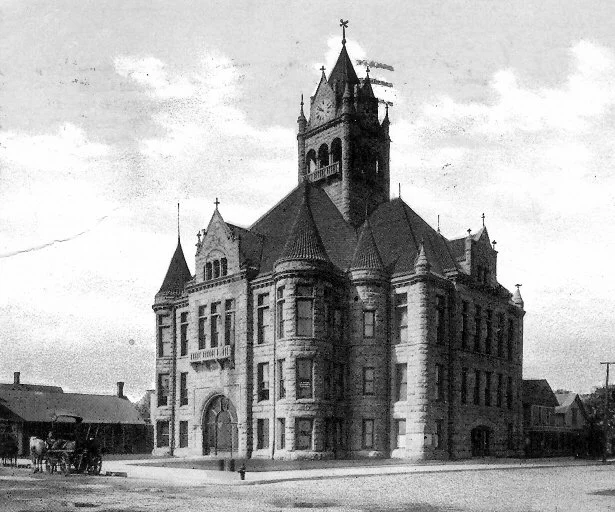
- The Lake County Superior Courthouse in Hammond. Built in 1903, it was demolished in 1974.
- Location: Hammond, Indiana, U.S.
- Date: December 4, 1916
- Target: Judge Charles E. Greenwald
- Attack type: Shooting
- Weapons: Four .38-caliber revolvers; Butcher knife; Saber; Hammer; Blackjack
- Injuries: 3
- Perpetrator: Mike Inik
- Motive: Monomania and Hallucinations
- Verdict: Guilty

The 1916 Lake County Superior Court shooting occurred on December 4, 1916, when Mike Inik, a Whiting, Indiana, laborer, opened fire inside the Lake County Superior Courthouse in Hammond, Indiana, wounding three people. Inik, then 49, had spent over a decade disputing the settlement he received for a workplace injury at a Standard Oil refinery, and arrived at the courthouse wearing a homemade suit of armor and carrying a concealed arsenal. Press coverage of the incident dubbed him "the Human Tank," and the attack was later profiled in a national magazine. Inik was ruled criminally insane and spent the rest of his life institutionalized.

== Background ==
=== Perpetrator ===
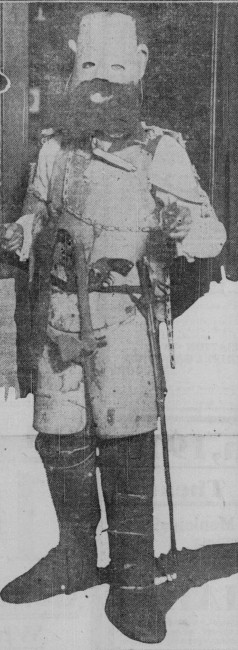
Mike Inik

Mike Inik, whose origins are not well documented, is described in contemporary press accounts as a "stockily built foreigner" and immigrant from the Balkans who had settled in Whiting, Indiana, by 1889, where he became a familiar local figure known for a slow, sideways shuffle, threadbare clothes, and a flowing beard. He was injured while working at the Standard Oil refinery in Whiting — accounts differ on whether he was struck by a falling pipe or fell from a scaffold. A Chicago court later awarded him a $1,500 settlement, which he refused to cash, insisting the figure was misplaced by two decimal points and that he was owed $150,000. By the time of the shooting, his stated demand had grown to $4,000,000; he reportedly kept the original check framed, and carried with him newspaper clippings, a list of workers killed at the Whiting refinery, and a list of lawyers he claimed to have petitioned. Now unemployed, he had earlier compiled a list of local factory pay days and taken to waiting outside their gates to beg from workers as they left for home.

For years afterward, Inik pursued his case obsessively, visiting court offices and directing his fixation — press accounts of the time diagnosed him with "monomania," a 19th- and early 20th-century term for a fixed, isolated obsession — squarely at refinery owner John D. Rockefeller and Standard Oil. On September 22, 1910, he and a Whiting acquaintance, Henry Gehrke, whom Inik described as his valet, were arrested in Washington, D.C., after demanding to see President William Howard Taft and Vice President James S. Sherman about the case; the two men were released the next morning on a promise to leave the city. In 1911, Lake County judge Virgil Reiter ruled Inik to be of unsound mind and appointed former Whiting mayor Fred Smith as his legal guardian. Undeterred, Inik continued showing up at the Hammond courthouse, by some accounts almost daily in the weeks before the shooting, pressing prosecutors to reopen his case.

== Shooting ==
On the morning of December 4, 1916, Inik arrived at the courthouse, dressed, in the words of one contemporary account, like a conquistador, wearing a suit of improvised armor made from galvanized iron, dishpans, and stove parts, concealed beneath his ordinary clothing, along with four .38-caliber revolvers and several edged and blunt weapons. A Gary police detective who spotted him carrying a sword did not raise an alarm, apparently because Inik was well known to courthouse staff and did not appear threatening. Inik first went to the office of county prosecutor J. A. Patterson before proceeding to the courtroom of Judge C. E. Greenwald for a hearing related to his disability settlement.

When Greenwald rebuffed Inik's petition, Inik opened fire, discharging roughly seven rounds. Greenwald was struck in the wrist, and a bailiff and a juror were also wounded; none of the injuries proved life-threatening. Courthouse personnel and bystanders subdued Inik before he could fire further shots, and he was arrested at the scene and jailed in Crown Point, Indiana.

== Aftermath ==
The shooting drew national press attention, with newspapers nicknaming Inik "the Human Tank" for his improvised armor. The story was later dramatized in the October 1917 issue of The Wide World Magazine in a feature titled "The Human 'Tank.'" George Robbins, the juror who tackled Inik, was left permanently scarred; in 1917 he sued and was awarded $400 in damages. The other two wounded men recovered fully. Held initially in the Crown Point jail, Inik went to trial again shortly afterward, this time over his mental competency; Judge Walter Hardy found him criminally insane and committed him to the psychiatric ward for the criminally insane at the Indiana State Prison in Michigan City, Indiana. He remained institutionalized until his death on August 2, 1945.

== See also ==
- Whiting, Indiana
- Standard Oil
- Carroll County Courthouse shooting
