= Murder of Nancy Harris =

2012 attack and murder of a woman in Garland, Texas

Nancy Harris
- Nancy Harris prior to her death.
- Born: Nancy Judith Hair; March 1, 1936; Fairbanks, Territory of Alaska, U.S.
- Died: May 25, 2012 (aged 76); Dallas, Texas, U.S.
- Cause of death: Burning
- Resting place: Restland Memorial Park, Dallas, Texas, US
- Occupation: Gas station clerk
- Known for: Victim of immolation attack

On May 20, 2012, in Garland, Texas, United States, 76-year-old Nancy Judith Harris (née Hair; March 1, 1936 – May 25, 2012) was murdered by Matthew Lee Johnson (September 17, 1975 – May 20, 2025) who doused her in lighter fluid and set her on fire during a robbery at the convenience store she worked. Johnson was found guilty of capital murder in 2013 and was sentenced to death.

Johnson lost all his appeals against the death sentence, and he was executed by lethal injection on May 20, 2025, the 13th anniversary of his crime. (Note: In a YouTube video, "Scheduled Execution (05/20/25): Matthew Johnson – Texas Death Row – Murder of Elderly Store Clerk", from Death Row and Executions by Paco Rivera, Nancy Harris' son reportedly commented that Johnson's execution date was not coincidental with the date of the crime. Furthermore, Harris' son also stated he requested the date with the Texas Attorney General's office who made the exception for the date despite not permitting specific dates.)

== Murder ==
On the morning of May 20, 2012, Nancy Harris began the opening shift at the Fina Whip-In convenience store, and Matthew Lee Johnson entered shortly after. He was seen on surveillance video carrying a lighter and a bottle which was later determined to contain lighter fluid. Johnson began to move behind the sales counter where Harris was and began to pour lighter fluid over Harris' head demanding money from her.

Harris attempted to open the cash register as Johnson positioned himself behind her. Once the register was open, Johnson removed the bills and coins as well as taking Harris's ring, two cigarette lighters and two packs of cigarettes before he ignited the lighter fluid. Harris was engulfed in flames as she fled from behind the counter to a nearby sink attempting to extinguish the flames on her body as Johnson walked out of the store, taking some candy on the way out. After failed attempts to put the flames out, she tried removing her shirt and leaned over the sink again, but was again ignited from her still burning shirt. After all her attempts, she ran outside the store screaming for help. A witness present near the scene used a fire extinguisher to put out the remaining flames left on Harris.

After law enforcement responded to the scene, they discovered Harris with severe burns. She was transported to the burn unit at Parkland Memorial Hospital before describing her attacker to police as a heavy-set black male with short dark hair and a chubby face.

Shortly after the attack, witnesses in the area recalled seeing the man who was described by Harris where he attempted to enter some people's properties. About an hour after the attack, Johnson was apprehended after a brief foot chase where he was found to be in possession of the stolen cash and items. Five days later, Nancy Harris succumbed to her burns and died on May 25th at Parkland Memorial Hospital. Following her death, Johnson's charges were upgraded to capital murder.

Prior to her death, Harris would spend Friday afternoons with her three granddaughters they called "Nini Days" going to the dollar store, eating McDonalds, and playing at her home. In 2000, Harris faced a health scare where she needed to cut down on sodium.

== Trial of Matthew Lee Johnson ==
=== Background on Johnson ===
Mugshot of Johnson

Matthew Lee Johnson was born on September 17, 1975, in Dallas County, Texas. Johnson was raised in a challenging environment mainly by his brothers and cousins and began exhibiting signs of instability and criminal behavior from an early age. He began using marijuana as early as age 7 and his criminal history began at the age of 15 with an arrest for car theft and escalated over the years. In 1994, he was arrested for violently resisting law enforcement, as well as biting police officers, and theft from a former employer in 2011. In 2004, Johnson was sentenced to five years in prison following a robbery and was released in 2009.

Johnson had some semblance of stability later in life; at the time of his trial, he was married and had three daughters. During the sentencing phase, Johnson expressed remorse and pled for mercy, stating he wanted to live long enough to see his children grow up.

=== Trial and sentencing ===
On October 28, 2013, Johnson stood trial in Dallas County, Texas for the capital murder of Nancy Harris. The prosecution sought the death penalty.

During the trial, the prosecution argued that Johnson intentionally caused the death of Nancy Harris during a robbery. They presented the store surveillance footage which captured Johnson pouring lighter fluid on Harris, demanding money, stealing items, and setting her on fire. Evidence also showed that Johnson was apprehended carrying Harris's ring and stolen cash. The prosecution emphasized the heinous nature of the crime, highlighting Johnson's calm demeanor after setting Harris on fire.

In his defense during the punishment phase, Johnson testified that he was under the influence of drugs at the time of the crime claiming he did not intend to set Harris on fire, but only to scare her and expressed remorse for his actions for the crime. The defense presented testimony about Johnson's long-standing struggle with drug addiction, starting at a young age as well as sexual abuse he went through as a child. An expert on addiction testified that Johnson was likely intoxicated at the time of the offense. Johnson's family and friends testified about his difficult childhood and his attempts to seek help for his addiction.

On October 30, 2013, the jury found Johnson guilty of capital murder. The sentencing phase of the trial commenced to determine whether Johnson would receive the death penalty or life imprisonment.

During the final submissions of the punishment phase, the prosecution sought the death penalty for Johnson, presenting extensive evidence of his prior criminal history which included a pattern of multiple arrests on various offenses. They argued that Johnson posed a significant danger to society. The defense argued for a life sentence, presenting evidence of Johnson's troubled childhood and his long history of drug abuse as mitigating factors. Experts testified that Johnson would pose a low risk of future violence within a prison setting.

In their victim impact statements, Nancy Harris's children and grandchildren conveyed their profound grief and anger. One of her sons stated he would be present at Johnson's execution. Another son expressed that he would never forgive Johnson and hoped his mother's screams would torment him forever. Granddaughters stated that Johnson was not genuinely sorry and would never be forgiven, emphasizing the value of their grandmother's life.

On November 8, 2013, Matthew Lee Johnson was unanimously sentenced to death. Johnson remained emotionless throughout the sentencing and victim impact statements. Following the verdict, his attorney stated that Johnson had expected the death sentence.

== Appeals ==
On November 18, 2015, the Texas Court of Criminal Appeals rejected Johnson's direct appeal, overruling the 65 points of error raised affirming Johnson's conviction and death sentence.

On June 27, 2016, the U.S. Supreme Court declined Johnson's appeal for writ of certiorari.

On September 11, 2019, the Texas Court of Criminal Appeals denied relief in Johnson's state habeas corpus proceeding.

On January 13, 2022, the U.S. District Court for the Northern District of Texas denied Johnson's federal habeas corpus petition.

On August 11, 2023, the 5th Circuit Court of Appeals denied Johnson's appeal.

On February 20, 2024, Johnson's final appeal was denied by the U.S. Supreme Court.

== Execution ==
=== Death warrant and execution ===
In January 2025, after exhausting his appeals, a Dallas County judge signed the death warrant for Johnson to be executed by lethal injection in Huntsville, Texas on May 20.

Johnson did not file any appeals to stay his execution and the sentence was carried out as scheduled. Johnson was pronounced dead at 6:53 p.m. CST. 18 hours earlier, Indiana executed Benjamin Donnie Ritchie for the shooting death of police officer William Toney in 2000. He died at 12:46 a.m.

=== Clemency ===
On May 16, 2025, the Texas Board of Pardons and Paroles denied Johnson's request for his death sentence to be commuted to a lesser penalty. Johnson's attorney stated he would not be pursuing any last appeals with the U.S. Supreme Court keeping his execution date as scheduled.

=== Last words ===
Johnson's last words were as follows:

First and foremost, I would like to give all praises to God. If it wasn't for him, I wouldn't be here on this Earth. I thank him for the life he has given me. To Mrs. Harris' family, as I look at each and every one of you, I see her on that day. I just please ask for y'all's forgiveness, I never meant to hurt her. I pray that she's the first person that I see when I open my eyes, and I will spend eternity with her. To my spiritual advisors, I love y'all, thank you. To all the administration at the Polunsky Unit for helping me and treating me like a man and treating me with fairness and giving me the opportunity to get in right standings with my Lord. To my beautiful wife, I'm sorry baby. I'm sorry for giving up, I'm sorry for quitting. I ask that you forgive me as well. To our beautiful daughters that you bore, Makayi, Deja, Maddox, I ask that you forgive me for giving up on y'all and walking away. Just know that it's nothing that y'all did. I made wrong choices, I've made wrong decisions, and now I pay the consequences. For all my brothers back on the row, I love y'all man, y'all continue on. Jesus is the way brothers, he is the only way. Thank you to my field ministers, my spiritual advisors, and my mentors. Thank you, brothers, for sitting with me, praying with me, just know man, you know who I'm talking to it wasn't your fault. If it wasn't from you, I would have got it somewhere. I thank the Lord for the last thirteen years, he has given me the opportunity to ask for his forgiveness, and I thank him for his redemption. Welcome me father, thank each and every one of you for being here. I'm done, Warden.

== See also ==
- Capital punishment in Texas
- Capital punishment in the United States
- List of people executed in Texas, 2020–present
- List of people executed in the United States in 2025

== Notes ==
Executions carried out in Texas
Preceded by Moises Mendoza April 23, 2025	Matthew Johnson; May 20, 2025	Succeeded by Blaine Milam September 25, 2025
Executions carried out in the United States
Preceded by Benjamin Ritchie – Indiana May 20, 2025	Matthew Johnson – Texas; May 20, 2025	Succeeded by Oscar Franklin Smith – Tennessee May 22, 2025
