= Murder of Stacy Payne =

2001 rape and murder of a teenage girl in Indiana

Stacy Payne
- Born: Stacy Lynn Payne; February 24, 1986; Spencer County, Indiana, U.S.
- Died: July 11, 2001 (aged 15); Spencer County, Indiana, U.S.
- Cause of death: Murder by stabbing and bludgeoning
- Resting place: Saint Martins Cemetery
- Occupation: Student

The murder of Stacy Payne (February 24, 1986 – July 11, 2001) occurred on July 11, 2001, in Spencer County, Indiana. On the day of her death, 15-year-old Payne was attacked by an intruder with a knife and dumbbell in her home, and she was ultimately raped and murdered by the attacker, identified as 29-year-old Roy Lee Ward (July 20, 1972 – October 10, 2025). Ward was arrested for the murder, for which he was convicted and sentenced to death. Ward was eventually executed on October 10, 2025, at the Indiana State Prison.

== Murder ==
On July 11, 2001, 15-year-old Stacy Lynn Payne, a student and cheerleader at Heritage Hills High School, was at home waiting to go to her part-time job at a pizza place when she received a visit from 29-year-old Roy Lee Ward, who claimed he was looking for a missing dog. He then forced himself inside, cut the phone lines, and attacked Payne with a knife and dumbbell. Payne was then raped and mortally wounded by Ward, who stabbed and battered her multiple times.

At the time of the attack, Payne's younger sister was also present at home, napping when she heard the sounds of Ward raping and harming her elder sister. Payne's sister, who witnessed the brutal crime, hid herself upstairs out of fear and called the police. Minutes later, a local town marshal Matt Keller responded to the police report and arrived at the scene, where he caught Ward wielding a knife and arrested him. According to Keller, he discovered Payne lying on the floor covered in blood, stripped completely naked and had her intestines exposed.

Although Payne was airlifted to the University of Louisville Hospital, her wounds were too severe and as a result, Payne succumbed to her injuries and she was pronounced dead at 4:18pm. An autopsy report revealed that Payne suffered 18 blunt force injuries, including injuries found within the area of her vagina. There were also laceration wounds on Payne's body, including one that cut through her spine from the back and another that penetrated her neck and cut her trachea.

At the time of her death, Payne was about to begin her sophomore year at Heritage Hills High School. According to sources, Payne was a well-rounded and active student who participated in a wide range of extracurricular activities. She played the flute in the school's marching band, was a cheerleader, served on the student council, and consistently made the honor roll. During the summer, Payne also volunteered as an arts and crafts teacher at her Bible school.

In the aftermath of Payne's murder, her sister and family advocated for introduction of stricter laws to ensure that repeat offenders convicted of public indecency were given longer and stiffer sentences, after it came to light that Ward was previously convicted of public indecency 25 times out of more than 50 past convictions. The new laws were eventually proposed and implemented in 2003.

== Court proceedings ==
=== Trial and initial death sentence ===
On July 16, 2001, Roy Lee Ward was charged with murder.

The following year, on October 14, 2002, Ward was put on trial for the rape and murder of Payne, and a Spencer County jury convicted him of murder on October 18, 2002. Ward was sentenced to death on December 18, 2002, upon the jury's unanimous recommendation for capital punishment. Ward was also sentenced to two consecutive jail terms of 50 years for rape and criminal deviate conduct.

=== First appeal and re-trial ===
On June 30, 2004, the Indiana Supreme Court overturned Ward's death sentence and murder conviction, and remitted his case back to the trial courts for a re-trial, after the court ruled that the original proceedings should have been moved out of Spencer County due to community outrage.

In November 2005, it was reported that the prosecution and defence could not decide on any other county to conduct a re-trial for Ward, who earlier offered to plead guilty on the condition that the death penalty was taken off the table, although no such deal was reached. A venue was decided in December 2005, and in December 2006, Vanderburgh Superior Court Judge Robert Pigman was appointed as the new trial judge after the original trial judge, Spencer County Circuit Judge Wayne Roell, recused him from the case.

On May 18, 2007, a Clay County jury recommended the death penalty for Ward a second time, after re-convicting Ward of first-degree murder. Judge Pigman followed the jury's recommendation and formally sentenced Ward to death for the murder of Payne.

=== Further appeals ===
On April 7, 2009, the Indiana Supreme Court dismissed Ward's appeal against his second death sentence.

Three years later, on June 21, 2012, the Indiana Supreme Court rejected Ward's appeal against his death sentence. In September 2012, the Indiana Supreme Court signed a death warrant and scheduled Ward's death sentence to be carried out on December 11, 2012. However, about a week before the execution was set to occur, Ward was granted a stay of execution to pursue further appeals.

On August 26, 2016, the 7th Circuit Court of Appeals turned down Ward's appeal against his death sentence.

On May 22, 2017, Ward's final appeal was denied by the U.S. Supreme Court.

On February 13, 2018, the Indiana Supreme Court rejected the appeal of Ward regarding the constitutionality of the lethal injection protocols.

By January 2014, Ward was listed as one of the 11 prisoners on Indiana's death row. Six years later, in another report in July 2020, Ward was one of eight inmates remaining on Indiana's death row.

== Death warrant and final appeals ==
On June 27, 2025, the Indiana Attorney-General filed a motion to schedule Ward's execution date, a month after the state executed convicted cop killer Benjamin Ritchie. This was the third time Indiana attempted to schedule a death sentence after the state resumed executions in December 2024 at the end of a 15-year moratorium, starting with the execution of convicted mass murderer Joseph Corcoran.

On July 7, 2025, the Indiana Supreme Court signed a death warrant for Ward, tentatively scheduling him to be executed on October 10, 2025, although his execution date was not officiated due to legal concerns over future litigation. Indiana Governor Mike Braun directed the Indiana Department of Corrections to procure execution drugs if necessary.

On August 12, 2025, Ward filed an appeal, requesting that his tentative execution date be vacated and cited concerns that the use of pentobarbital, the drug required to carry out death sentences in Indiana, could result in cruel and unusual punishment and violate his constitutional rights. Ward's counsel also submitted witness testimonies, which showed that Ritchie, the condemned inmate executed prior to Ward, had allegedly made violent and abrupt movements on the gurney before he was pronounced dead. However, the prosecution asked the Indiana Supreme Court to finalize the execution date and stated that Ward had no valid legal grounds to delay his execution.

On August 28, 2025, the Indiana Supreme Court finalized the execution date of Ward and made it official after rejecting Ward's appeal.

The final recourse for Ward was a clemency petition to the governor of Indiana. On September 12, 2025, the Indiana Parole Board scheduled a clemency hearing for Ward. Should clemency be granted, Ward's death sentence would be commuted to life imprisonment without the possibility of parole. Although a one to one interview was set for Ward before the parole board's public hearing, Ward declined to be interviewed, and his clemency hearing thus proceeded publicly before the parole board.

On September 23, 2025, the public clemency hearing of Ward commenced before the parole board's five-member panel. Ward's defense counsel argued that their client deserved mercy as he was remorseful for his crimes and presented a medical report that showed Ward having autism spectrum disorder, which reportedly went undiagnosed up until recently, and it affected his mental state at the time of the murder. Payne's mother reportedly made a statement in the hearing, "Now our family gatherings are no longer whole, holidays still empty. Birthdays are sad reminders of what we lost. Our family has endured emotional devastation."

A day later, on September 24, 2025, the parole board denied clemency for Ward and the board's recommendation was relayed to the governor. The board cited the brutal nature of the murder and rape of Stacy Payne and aggravating circumstances as their reasons for the refusal of clemency.

On September 29, 2025, Governor Braun concurred with the board's results and officially rejected Ward's clemency plea, allowing the execution to move forward.

On October 8, 2025, Ward withdrew his two federal appeals against the death sentence, effectively paving way for his execution to be conducted. Ward also did not appeal to the U.S. Supreme Court for a stay of execution.

== Execution ==
On October 10, 2025, 53-year-old Roy Lee Ward was put to death by lethal injection at the Indiana State Prison shortly after midnight; the official time of death was 12:33 am. For his last meal, Ward ordered a hamburger, a steak melt, fries, a baked potato with butter, 12 fried shrimps, a sweet potato, chicken alfredo, and some breadsticks. Before his death sentence was carried out, Ward's last words were, "Brian is going to read them." referring to Deacon Brian Nosbusch who was present at the execution, but did not get the chance to read Ward's statement.

== See also ==
- Capital punishment in Indiana
- List of people executed in Indiana
- List of people executed in the United States in 2025

Executions carried out in Indiana
Preceded by Benjamin Donnie Ritchie May 20, 2025	Roy Lee Ward; October 10, 2025	Succeeded by Jeffrey Allen Weisheit November 5, 2026
Executions carried out in the United States
Preceded by Victor Tony Jones – Florida September 30, 2025	Roy Lee Ward – Indiana; October 10, 2025	Succeeded by Samuel Lee Smithers – Florida October 14, 2025
