= William Clyde Gibson =

American serial killer on death row

- IDOC mugshot
- Born: William Clyde Gibson III; October 10, 1957 (age 69); Raleigh, North Carolina, U.S.
- Status: Incarcerated
- Convictions: Murder (3 counts); Rape; Auto theft
- Penalty: Death

Details
- Victims: 3–33
- Span of crimes: 2002 – 2012 (confirmed murders)
- Country: United States
- States: Indiana, others alleged
- Locations: New Albany, Indiana, Ohio River
- Date apprehended: April 19, 2012
- Imprisoned at: Indiana State Prison, Michigan City, Indiana

William Clyde Gibson III (born October 10, 1957) is an American serial killer and rapist who is currently on Indiana's death row for the sexually motivated murders of two women in 2002 and 2012, in addition to serving a 65-year sentence for a third murder committed in 2012. A habitual criminal noted for his increasingly violent streaks and his handlebar moustache, Gibson has claimed responsibility for upwards of 30 additional murders across multiple states, none of which have been confirmed.

== Early life ==
William Clyde Gibson III was born on October 10, 1957, in Raleigh, North Carolina, the youngest of four children born to William Jr., a foreman for a tree-trimming company, and Jeraline "Geri" Gibson, a cashier at a Sears store. When he was two years old, the family moved out of state and settled in New Albany, Indiana, where Gibson grew up. In later interviews, he claimed that he had never experienced any abuse or neglect from either of his parents. He said he was even spoiled but acknowledged that his father was an alcoholic who would become combative when drunk.

From an early age, Gibson displayed odd behavior, having trouble speaking to others, struggling at school, and preferring to stay home with his mother. Whenever he went to school, Gibson was bullied up until the sixth grade, when he became large enough to defend himself - however, he started bullying other children. He often got in trouble for fighting, talking in class, and not following directions. This continued outside of school, with a childhood friend, Melodie Schultz, claiming that Gibson had shot another child in the eye with a pellet gun. At age 13, he also started drinking and later that year, would be arrested for stealing a motorbike.

Eventually, Gibson dropped out of school and continued to commit small-time crimes, including drunk driving and crashing the car. Two weeks after this incident, he joined the Army and was stationed in West Germany as a mechanic. During his deployment, he was awarded badges for marksmanship and hand grenade usage, but at this time, he developed an addiction to drugs such as heroin, cocaine, and LSD, which he often mixed with alcohol. In 1979, he was dishonorably discharged for stealing a car and sentenced to a year of imprisonment at Fort Leavenworth, where he attempted to kill himself by slitting his wrists on one occasion.

== Crimes ==
On January 26, 1991, Gibson hit another vehicle while backing up in his pickup truck, but sped off after seeing a nearby police officer attempt to inspect the damage. In an ensuing high-speed chase, he eventually crashed into another vehicle, from which the other driver had eight ribs broken, and Gibson suffered injuries that required numerous stitches on his head. Eight months later, Gibson was charged with robbery and sexual battery relating to an incident involving a 21-year-old woman whom he sexually assaulted in a phone booth near the Louisville Galleria in Louisville, Kentucky. At the subsequent trial for this case, his lawyer claimed that he was mentally ill and requested a competency evaluation, which the court granted. The examining psychologist, J. Robert Noonan, concluded that Gibson had an IQ of 79 and refused to take responsibility for his actions, which he blamed on his alcoholism, but did not suffer from any mental illnesses that impaired his judgment. Due to this, he was found competent to stand trial and accepted an Alford plea, for which he was sentenced to seven years imprisonment at the Luther Luckett Correctional Complex in La Grange. Upon learning of his conviction, his wife divorced him.

During his imprisonment, where he was ordered to attend a sex offender rehabilitation program, Gibson refused to admit responsibility for his crime and was thus deemed ineligible to participate. While he was considered an obedient inmate who rarely caused trouble, even earning an associate degree in art from the Lindsey Wilson College, several psychiatric assessments concluded that Gibson had poor judgment and often experienced conflicting feelings of loneliness and losing control. Despite these diagnostics and his refusal to complete the rehabilitation program, he was deemed unlikely to re-offend. He was released on April 5, 1999, after which he was added to the Indiana Sex and Violent Offender Registry. After his release, he started dating Kelly Bailey. The pair moved to an apartment in Borden, Indiana. However, Bailey left him in 2000 due to Gibson's worsening drug habits.

Later that year, Bailey filed a police report claiming that Gibson had blocked her car with his vehicle while she was delivering newspapers and proceeded to hit her before stealing her car keys and fleeing the scene. While her case was considered credible due to the visible injuries on her face, it was ultimately not pursued due to a lack of evidence. The following year, Gibson was arrested for stealing a Harley-Davidson motorcycle and sentenced to 3 years imprisonment, but was allowed to spend half of that time at the Madison State Hospital in Madison, where he would receive treatment for his drug and alcohol addiction. Hospital staff claimed that Gibson seemed disinterested in the treatments, and two psychiatrists later diagnosed him with a bipolar disorder, for which he was prescribed Seroquel, but again, no indications of a mental illness or a psychiatric disorder were noted. After his release from the hospital, he was sent to serve the rest of his sentence at the Floyd County Jail, where he remained until his discharge on March 12, 2002.

=== Known murders ===
On October 10, 2002, Gibson was out drinking at a bar in Jeffersonville when he met 44-year-old Karen Sue Hodella, a beautician from Port Orange, Florida, who was visiting a boyfriend of hers at the time. After spending some time at local bars, the pair found themselves at an apartment complex in New Albany. They argued over some prescription medication that Gibson had supposedly stolen. Angered by the accusations, Gibson punched Hodella in the face, then took out a pocket knife and stabbed her multiple times in the throat before driving around and dumping her body in Clarksville. Soon after the murder, he had a tattoo inscribed on his lower right arm indicating the date of the murder, accompanied by an image of a knife. Hodella's badly decomposed body was found on January 7, 2003, and identified via dental records.

Three weeks after the murder, Gibson was arrested for driving a GMC truck while drunk. After going through a four-day withdrawal, he was examined by the prison's psychiatrist, Dr. Daniel Howerton. While Gibson complained of frequent headaches, stomachaches, insomnia and hypochondriasis, Howerton and the prison's mental therapist concluded that he suffered from mild anxiety and had indications of anti-social behavior, but was otherwise sane. In May 2003, Gibson sued the prison authorities, claiming that they had improperly denied him access to Seroquel and for housing him in squalid conditions, but the suit was thrown out by a federal judge, who considered it baseless.

After being released from jail, Gibson continued hanging around bars, but on February 21, 2006, he stole a purse and $300 from a female acquaintance. Her husband tracked down Gibson's brown Toyota and had him arrested for theft, with Gibson serving a 3-year sentence until he was released circa Independence Day in 2009. During that time, he found a job at C&C Hardwood Flooring in Borden, where he was described as a diligent worker, and was regarded positively by friends and neighbors for attending the local non-denominational "Power of the Cross" church, making papier-mâché figures and for helping his sick mother - on the other hand, patrons of the bars he frequented considered him strange, and on at least a few occasions, he had asked out women to visit his home, to varying success.

Gibson eventually stopped attending church altogether in late August 2011, when his mother was admitted into a nursing home. She died at Floyd Memorial Hospital on January 18, 2012, with some neighbors suspecting that her death greatly impacted Gibson's psyche. On March 24 that year, he met 35-year-old Stephanie Marie Kirk at the Uptown Bar in New Albany, where he arranged to take her on a motorcycle ride. After spending the day doing drugs and having sex, the pair returned to Gibson's house, where they argued over some pills. In his anger, Gibson proceeded to rape and strangle her, sexually assaulted her body, breaking her back in the process and then burying her body in his backyard. On April 18, he was visited by a 75-year-old friend of his late mother, Christine Whitis. The latter had always supported Gibson and even gave him money. He raped and strangled her before mutilating her corpse, cutting off one of her breasts. Then, he left the body on the garage floor, surrounded by garbage bags.

== Arrest, trials and imprisonment ==
On the following day, one of Gibson's sisters went to their mother's house to settle the division of the family estate, and after checking the garage and finding Whitis' body, she immediately notified the police. Later that day, Gibson was arrested for drunk driving in Whitis' car, and was charged with her murder five days later. A few days later, he confessed responsibility for Hodella's murder. He also willingly led them to the location where he had buried Kirk's body, and on April 27, authorities dug up her body from his backyard. On May 23, Gibson was officially charged with her murder as well, with prosecutors announcing that they would seek the death penalty for all three killings.

During his murder trial, prosecutors presented an interview Gibson had given to investigators upon his arrest, during which he claimed that an "evil" had overcome him and had made him commit the murder. On October 25, 2013, Gibson was found guilty in Whitis' murder at a jury trial, with the jurors taking less than 20 minutes to find him guilty on all charges. At his sentencing the following month, Gibson was subsequently handed a death sentence, to which he told the sentencing judge that it was "no big deal" and that he deserved what he was getting. In regards to his upcoming murder trials, he changed his plea and waived his right to a speedy trial, choosing to plead guilty to Hodella's murder instead. As part of the deal, it was decided that evidence presented at the Hodella trial would not be used as evidence or an aggravating factor in any follow-up trials. A substantial issue arose when Gibson had a tattoo done on the back of his shaved head, which said "Death Row X3". According to Justice Susan Orth, the tattoo could prejudice the jury and possibly prevent a fair trial, and because of this, prison authorities were forbidden from cutting Gibson's hair so the tattoo could be covered up.

At this final murder trial, Gibson unexpectedly pleaded guilty again, waiving his right to a jury trial. In spite of the guilty plea, prosecutors pushed for another death sentence, aiming to prove aggravating factors during the commission of Kirk's murder. On August 15, 2014, Gibson was sentenced to death again, with sentencing Justice Orth deeming that it was "the only appropriate sentence" in regards to the brutal killing.

== Aftermath ==
Since his incarceration, Gibson has repeatedly appealed his death sentences, with his defense lawyer claiming that his confession to the Kirk murder was a mitigating circumstance. These appeals were rejected by the Indiana Supreme Court, which reaffirmed all of his convictions.

In 2018, he was amongst several death row inmates to be featured in the documentary Inside Death Row, hosted by British journalist Trevor McDonald. Gibson has also done several interviews on various podcasts, on which he has professed responsibility for an additional 30 murders committed across multiple states, additionally claiming that he has sexually abused and even cannibalized the victims' corpses. Among the murders he has confessed to is the 2000 murder of Elizabeth Banister, who was stabbed to death at her home in Evansville, but so far, he has not been charged with her murder. He was featured in a True Lives documentary in 2018, where he claimed the police only had discovered a tenth of whom he had killed.

== See also ==
- Capital punishment in Indiana
- List of death row inmates in the United States § Indiana
- List of serial killers in the United States
