= William Vandiver =

American convicted murderer (1948–1985)

- Vandiver less than a month before his execution
- Born: August 26, 1948; Bernie, Missouri, U.S.
- Died: October 16, 1985 (aged 37); Indiana State Prison, Indiana, U.S.
- Status: Executed by electrocution
- Conviction: Murder (1 count)
- Penalty: Death (January 20, 1984)

Details
- Victims: 1
- Date: March 20, 1983
- Country: United States
- State: Indiana
- Location: Hammond, Indiana (1983)
- Imprisoned at: Indiana State Prison

William Earl Vandiver (August 26, 1948 – October 16, 1985) was an American convicted murderer who was found guilty of murdering his father-in-law in Hammond, Indiana. On March 20, 1983, as part of a conspiracy involving Vandiver, his wife, her brother, and their mother, Vandiver and his wife's brother fatally stabbed and mutilated 65-year-old Paul Komyatti Sr., Vandiver's father-in-law, before they butchered the body into pieces, which were all packed in six garbage bags and disposed of. Vandiver and the three co-conspirators were all charged with the murder, but only Vandiver was sentenced to death, while the rest were given prison sentences for lesser charges. Vandiver was ultimately executed in the electric chair on October 16, 1985, after waiving all his rights to appeal and volunteering to be executed.

== Murder of Paul Komyatti Sr. ==
On March 20, 1983, William Earl Vandiver committed the murder of his father-in-law as part of a conspiracy between him and his wife and her family.

Prior to the crime, Vandiver was married to Mariann Komyatti, the daughter of Paul Komyatti Sr. (November 23, 1917 – March 20, 1983) and Rosemary Bridgewater Komyatti (September 4, 1925 – February 16, 2012). By all accounts, 65-year-old Paul Komyatti Sr. often verbally abused his wife, daughter and son Paul Komyatti Jr., and whenever he drank excessively, he would become loud and violent. Additionally, Komyatti often demanded his daughter to divorce Vandiver, because Vandiver was a suspect wanted by the Illinois authorities for a murder case in Chicago, and he also repeatedly threatened to inform the police on Vandiver.

Given the abusive nature of Komyatti and additionally on account of his life insurance policy and a $90,000 estate, the four – Vandiver, Mariann, Rosemary and Paul Jr. – banded together and formulated a plot to murder Komyatti. The four co-conspirators made several attempts to poison Komyatti to death by spiking his food, medicine, or coffee, but some of them failed while others were aborted.

Between the late night hours of March 19, 1983, and the early morning hours of March 20, 1983, Vandiver and his brother-in-law Paul Jr. carried out their latest and final attempt on Komyatti's life while he was asleep. Using a fish fillet knife, Vandiver stabbed Komyatti 34 times and mutilated him, and even used a gun to batter Komyatti on the head five to six times. After the brutal attack, the four killers – Vandiver, Mariann, Rosemary and Paul Jr. – chopped up the body into pieces, separating the victim's head, arms and legs with a hacksaw. According to Vandiver, Komyatti was still breathing right before the dismemberment, and he died after the decapitation of his head. The body parts were subsequently packed in six plastic bags and later disposed of near the Lake Michigan shoreline.

== Arrest and charges ==
A month after the murder of her husband, Paul Komyatti Sr.'s wife Rosemary Komyatti reported her husband missing on April 15, 1983. At first, Rosemary lied to Komyatti's best friend that her husband had gone ice fishing in Canada, before finally admitting to her husband's friends and neighbours, who had all begun to suspect Komyatti's disappearance, that she had lost touch of her husband's whereabouts. The body parts were eventually found on May 14, 1983, after the police received a tip that Komyatti was murdered and buried along Lake Michigan.

A day after the body parts were found, Vandiver's 27-year-old wife Mariann was arrested as a suspect after the case was classified as murder, while 34-year-old Vandiver himself was arrested soon after he was listed as a fugitive. Komyatti's 18-year-old son Paul Jr. was arrested on May 21, 1983, while 58-year-old Rosemary was charged on June 20, 1983.

== Murder trial and sentencing ==
Of the four accused of Komyatti's murder, William Vandiver was the last to stand trial for the murder of his father-in-law. Before his trial was slated to begin, Vandiver's wife, mother-in-law and brother-in-law were convicted in separate trials for their respective roles in the murder. Vandiver's wife Mariann reached a plea agreement with the prosecution and became a prosecution witness after she admitted to reduced charges of abetting a criminal, and was sentenced to eight years' imprisonment. Both Rosemary and Paul Jr. were convicted by a Lake County Superior Court jury of one count each of murder and conspiracy to commit murder, with Rosemary sentenced to 100 years' imprisonment and Paul Jr. sentenced to 55 years' imprisonment.

Vandiver stood trial before a jury at the Lake County Superior Court on December 12, 1983, five days after the conviction of Paul Jr. and Rosemary. Vandiver reportedly argued that the actual killer was Paul Jr. and he only admitted to helping the others to dispose of the body parts.

On December 19, 1983, the jury found Vandiver guilty of murdering his father-in-law. The sentencing phase commenced afterwards, with the prosecution seeking the death penalty for Vandiver, citing the premeditated nature of the homicide and that Vandiver received payment for the murderous deed. A psychiatrist testified during the hearing and described Vandiver as an "animal". Two days later, on December 21, 1983, the jury unanimously recommended the death penalty for Vandiver, with the judge set to formally decide on sentence in a later hearing.

On January 20, 1984, Judge James E. Letsinger sentenced 35-year-old William Earl Vandiver to death for the murder of Paul Komyatti Sr., with Letsinger citing in his verdict that societal acts of brutality had become so routine that "victims are routinely asked to pay the price of their lives", and emphasized that the imposition of death in Vandiver's case was not for vengeance, but for upholding the principles of societal conscience and deterrence.

== Execution ==
After he was sentenced to death, William Vandiver expressed that he did not want to appeal his death sentence and was willing to be executed, although there was a mandatory automatic appeal required to be expedited in Indiana's death penalty cases. On July 29, 1985, the Indiana Supreme Court decided that Vandiver was mentally competent to waive his appeals and be executed, and also dismissed the appeal after affirming both his conviction and sentence.

The execution date of Vandiver was eventually set for October 16, 1985, and after he was notified of the death warrant, Vandiver expressed that he was still willing to die, and he once again affirmed that he hoped to be executed and be in peace on the eve of his execution. About two weeks before his execution, Vandiver reportedly expressed to prison officials that he wished to be cremated and he wanted to see his wife one final time. At that time, Vandiver's wife Mariann was serving her eight-year jail term at the Westville Correctional Facility.

On October 16, 1985, 37-year-old William Earl Vandiver was put to death by the electric chair at the Indiana State Prison. However, according to reports, Vandiver was reportedly brain dead but still breathing when the electric chair was first activated at 12:03 a.m. with an administration of 2,300 volts and a longer administration of 500 volts. The current was applied three more times before he was finally pronounced dead 17 minutes later. Vandiver's lawyer, Herbert Shaps, witnessed the execution and reportedly observed smoke and the smell of burning, and he condemned the execution as "outrageous". The prolonged and botched execution of Vandiver prompted a review from the state Board of Correction, although a state official defended the execution as being "professionally done".

Prior to his execution, Vandiver was allowed to meet his spiritual adviser. He additionally ordered a last meal of pizza and shared it with his wife, who was granted permission to visit her husband for the final time before the death sentence was carried out. Vandiver's execution marked the second time Indiana carried out the death penalty since reinstating capital punishment in 1981 — the same year Steven Judy was executed for committing four murders. It was also the 49th documented execution in the United States since the nationwide resumption of capital punishment in 1976. For the nine years following Vandiver's execution, Indiana did not carry out another execution until Gregory Resnover, who was found guilty of murdering a police officer, was put to death on December 8, 1994.

== Aftermath ==
On March 25, 1986, five months after the execution of William Vandiver, both Rosemary Komyatti and Paul Komyatti Jr. lost their appeals against their convictions and sentences for the murder of Paul Komyatti Sr.

About 24 years after the execution of her son-in-law, Rosemary filed an appeal against her 100-year jail term, seeking to reduce it on the grounds that she did not have the opportunity to raise a defence of battered women's syndrome during her original murder trial. However, on September 17, 2009, Judge Clarence Murray rejected her motion to shorten her sentence, stating that it was not in the best of interests for justice to downgrade her punishment. Rosemary would die in prison at the age of 86 on February 16, 2012.

Paul Jr., meanwhile, served 27 years in prison before he was released in May 2009. However, three months after regaining his freedom, Paul Jr. was arrested for parole violation due to him travelling to Michigan City. Based on reports, Paul Jr. displayed good behaviour in prison and earned three bachelor's degrees from Ball State University, but faced difficulties in adapting to life outside prison. Paul Jr. would serve another ten months behind bars before he was released in May 2010.

After serving two years out of her eight-year sentence, Vandiver's wife Mariann was released from prison.

== See also ==
- Capital punishment in Indiana
- List of people executed in Indiana
- List of people executed in the United States in 1985
- Volunteer (capital punishment)

Executions carried out in Indiana
Preceded by Steven Judy March 9, 1981	William Vandiver; October 16, 1985	Succeeded by Gregory Resnover December 8, 1994
Executions carried out in the United States
Preceded by Charles Rumbaugh – Texas September 11, 1985	William Vandiver – Indiana; October 16, 1985	Succeeded by Carroll Cole – Nevada December 6, 1985
