= Matthew Wrinkles =

American murderer (1960–2009)

- Undated image of Wrinkles by the IDOC
- Born: Matthew Eric Wrinkles; January 3, 1960; Evansville, Indiana, U.S.
- Died: December 11, 2009 (aged 49); Indiana State Prison, Michigan City, Indiana, U.S.
- Cause of death: Execution by lethal injection
- Conviction: Murder (3 counts)
- Penalty: Death (June 14, 1995)

Details
- Victims: Debra Jean Wrinkles, 31; Tony Fulkerson, 28; Natalie Fulkerson, 26
- Date: July 21, 1994

Matthew Eric Wrinkles (January 3, 1960 – December 11, 2009) was a convicted multiple murderer. He served fourteen years at Indiana State Prison in Michigan City, Indiana, and was executed there on December 11, 2009.

== Crime ==
On July 21, 1994, Wrinkles murdered his estranged wife, Debra Jean Wrinkles; his brother-in-law, Tony Fulkerson; and Fulkerson's wife, Natalie Fulkerson; at their residence in Evansville. Debra Wrinkles and her two children had been living with the Fulkersons since her separation from Wrinkles. Wrinkles blamed his actions on his addiction to methamphetamine.

Two weeks before the murders took place, Wrinkles' mother had made efforts to have him committed to a psychiatric facility due to his erratic behavior, but was informed that he did not meet the criteria. He was then hospitalized at a different facility; after three days of evaluations, a psychiatrist concluded that he was not "gravely disabled" and discharged him.

After his release, despite a protective order, Wrinkles went looking for Debra at her place of employment and at the homes of two of her friends, demanding to see her. He was unsuccessful each time.

On July 20, 1994, Wrinkles, his wife, and their attorneys met for a provisional hearing in their divorce proceeding. They reached an agreement to set aside the protective order, and for Wrinkles to have visitation. They also agreed that Debra and Wrinkles would meet with the children at a restaurant later that day, but Debra elected not to keep that appointment. Later that night, Wrinkles, dressed in camouflage clothing and face paint, armed with a .357 handgun and a knife, drove to the home of Tony and Natalie Fulkerson. He parked a block away, cut the telephone wires, and kicked in the back door. Wrinkles killed Tony in the bedroom with four gunshot wounds to his face, hip, chest, and back; Natalie on the front porch with a gunshot wound to her face; and Debra in the hallway with a gunshot wound to her chest and shoulder area. Wrinkles was later arrested at the home of his cousin, where the .357 murder weapon was recovered. He was convicted of the murders on June 14, 1995, and sentenced to death.

== Incarceration ==
On November 3, 2009, after the Indiana Supreme Court declined Wrinkles' final review motion, an execution date of December 11, 2009, was announced. A week later, Wrinkles appeared as a guest, via remote feed from the prison, on a segment of The Oprah Winfrey Show, where he was confronted by members of his victims' families.

== Execution ==
Wrinkles's last meal—prime rib, loaded baked potato, pork chops with fries, rolls and two salads with ranch dressing—was served on December 9. Indiana serves the traditional last meal three days prior to execution, based on the assumption that a condemned prisoner tends to lose appetite as the time of execution approaches. Fellow inmate Rick Pearish noted in a 2013 documentary that Wrinkles shouted, "I'll see you fellas!" down the cell block corridor as a last goodbye whilst being led to the death house on the Indiana State Prison grounds. His execution by lethal injection took place as scheduled; the time of death was 12:39 a.m. CST on December 11, 2009. He was 49 years old. Wrinkles declined to make a final statement, saying only, "Let's get it done. Let's lock and load ... it's plagiarized, but what the hell."

Wrinkles remained the state of Indiana's most recent execution for just over 15 years until the state executed Joseph Corcoran on December 18, 2024.

== See also ==
- Capital punishment in Indiana
- Capital punishment in the United States
- List of people executed in Indiana
- List of people executed in the United States in 2009

Executions carried out in Indiana
Preceded by Michael Lambert June 15, 2007	Matthew Wrinkles; December 11, 2009	Succeeded by Joseph Corcoran December 18, 2024
Executions carried out in the United States
Preceded by Kenneth Biros – Ohio December 8, 2009	Matthew Wrinkles – Indiana; December 11, 2009	Succeeded by Vernon Smith – Ohio January 7, 2010
