= Eric Holmes =

Eric Holmes may refer to:

- Eric Leighton Holmes (fl. 1935), British chemist
- John Eric Holmes (1930–2010), American writer and neurologist
- Eric Darnell Holmes (born 1968), American convicted murderer
- Eric Holmes (racing driver) (born 1974), American race car driver
- Eric Holmes (video game designer), Scottish writer, creative director and videogame designer
