= Orville Lynn Majors =

American serial killer

- Born: April 24, 1961; Linton, Indiana, U.S.
- Died: September 24, 2017 (aged 56); Indiana State Prison, Michigan City, Indiana, U.S.
- Occupation: Licensed practical nurse
- Conviction: Murder (6 counts)
- Penalty: 360 years imprisonment

Details
- Victims: 6–130
- Span of crimes: 1993–1995
- Country: United States
- State: Indiana
- Date apprehended: 1997

Orville Lynn Majors (April 24, 1961 – September 24, 2017) was a licensed practical nurse and serial killer who was convicted of murdering his patients in Clinton, Indiana. Though he was tried for only seven murders and convicted of six, he was believed to have caused additional deaths between 1993 and 1995, when he was employed by the hospital at which the deaths occurred and for which he was investigated. It was reported that he murdered patients whom he claimed were demanding, whiny, or disproportionately adding to his work load.

== Early life and career ==
Majors was born in Linton, Indiana, in 1961. He took care of his elderly grandmother as a teen, and that experience led him to go into nursing. He graduated from Nashville Memorial School of Practical Nursing in 1989 and took a job at Vermillion County Hospital in Clinton, north of Terre Haute. He briefly took a higher-paying job in Tennessee but returned to VCH in 1993.

== Investigation ==
Majors was one of the most popular nurses at VCH, especially among elderly patients. He received glowing evaluations.

However, suspicion developed when the death rate at VCH jumped significantly after Majors had returned to Indiana. The year before his return to VCH, an average of around 26 patients died annually at the 56-bed hospital and the four-bed intensive care unit. After Majors started working at the facility, however, the rate skyrocketed to more than 100 per year, with nearly one out of every three patients admitted to the hospital dying.

Also, the circumstances of the deaths attracted skepticism even though most of them were elderly. Some died from an erratic heartbeat after respiratory arrest, the reverse of the normal pattern. Others died from conditions that they had not had when they were admitted or took a sharp downturn although they had otherwise been healthy. Meanwhile, patients began coding at an alarming rate.

Eventually, Majors's coworkers began noticing a correlation between the spike in deaths and when he was on duty and joked about when the next patient would die. However, in 1995, nursing supervisor Dawn Stirek was concerned enough to check the time cards to see who was on duty during the deaths. She discovered that Majors was on duty for 130 of the 147 deaths between 1993 and 1995. Alarmed, she alerted hospital officials, who called in the Indiana State Police. Majors was suspended pending investigation. The Indiana State Nursing Board suspended Majors's license for five years after it had determined he had exceeded his authority by giving emergency drugs and by working in an ICU without a doctor, and VCH fired him.

Investigators then determined that when Majors was on duty, there was an average of one death every 23 hours, a pattern that held whether he worked on weekdays or weekends. When he was off duty, the death rate dropped to one every 551 hours (23 days). They also determined that a patient at VCH was 42 times more likely to die when Majors was on duty.

Majors adamantly denied wrongdoing. While running a pet store in his hometown of Linton, he hired a lawyer and made the rounds of talk shows to proclaim his innocence. Prosecutors and the state police were hamstrung at first. They had believed from the beginning that Majors was a killer but could not prove how he killed. However, after Majors began his public relations offensive, several relatives of patients who died at VCH called the state police to report suspicious behavior on Majors's part before their loved ones' deaths. They recalled that their loved ones coded or died within minutes of Majors giving them injections, in some cases before he had left the room.

The state police medical team noticed several patients' heart patterns widening around the time that Majors was on duty. They called in electrophysiologist Eric N. Prystowsky to look at the EKGs. Prystowsky suspected that there were only three explanations for these patterns: a potassium overdose, a sudden heart attack, or a large clot in the lung. With that in mind, in September 1995, state officials began exhuming 15 patients who had been witnessed getting injections and had widening heart patterns around the time that they died. None of the bodies had signs of a heart attack or clotting in the lung, which proved that they had been murdered. After a former roommate recalled seeing potassium chloride and epinephrine vials in their house, police obtained a search warrant and discovered numerous vials that could be traced back to the hospital.

== Prosecution and trial ==
After a two-year investigation, Majors was arrested in December 1997 and charged with seven murders. Investigators believed he killed 100 to 130 people. However, prosecutors chose to focus on only seven to avoid overwhelming the jury. A total of 79 witnesses were called to the stand at his trial in 1999. Some of the witnesses testified that he hated elderly people and that he believed that they "should be gassed."

Majors was convicted on October 17 for six murders; the jury deadlocked on a seventh because the victim had taken longer to die than the others. He was sentenced to six consecutive terms of 60 years, the maximum possible penalty under Indiana law at the time, which virtually assured that he would die in prison. The presiding judge, Ernest Yelton, described Majors's crimes as "diabolical acts" and "a parallel of evil at its most wicked," and he concluded that "the maximum sentence is the minimum sentence in this case."

== Aftermath ==
VCH, which was renamed West Central Community Hospital after it had ousted Majors, was served with wrongful-death suits by the families of 80 patients who had died at Majors' hands. Most of them settled the suits and were compensated by a state patients' fund. The hospital was subsequently fined $80,000 for negligence and code violations and was briefly forced to shut down for losing its accreditation. By 2009, it had been taken over by Union Hospital, based in Terre Haute, and renamed Union Hospital Clinton.

Majors appealed to the Indiana Supreme Court, which let the verdict stand in 2002. He served his sentence at Indiana State Prison in Michigan City, where he died of heart failure on September 24, 2017.

== See also ==
- List of serial killers in the United States
- List of serial killers by number of victims
