= Murder of Jack Ohrberg =

1980 murder of an Indianapolis police officer in Indiana

- Ohrberg, c. 1970s
- Date: December 11, 1980
- Location: Indianapolis, Indiana, U.S.
- Type: Murder by shooting
- Deaths: Jack Ohrberg, 44
- Injuries: Tommie Smith (one of the perpetrators)
- Convicted: Gregory Resnover, 29; Tommie Smith, 26
- Sentence: Death (Resnover and Smith)
- Victim information
- Born: Jack Robert Ohrberg; November 21, 1936; Brooklyn, New York, U.S.
- Died: December 11, 1980 (aged 44); Indianapolis, Indiana, U.S.
- Cause of death: Multiple gunshot wounds
- Occupation: Indianapolis Police Department (Detective Sergeant)
- Children: 4

On December 11, 1980, in Indianapolis, Indiana, 44-year-old Jack Robert Ohrberg (November 21, 1936 – December 11, 1980), an Indianapolis Police Sergeant, was shot and killed by two men while he was serving an arrest warrant on several gang members for bank robbery and murder. At the time of Sergeant Ohrberg's murder, the perpetrators, Gregory Duane Resnover (Note: Also known by the alias Ajamu Nassor Resnover.) (August 12, 1951 – December 8, 1994) and Tommie Joe Smith (Note: His name was spelt as Tommy Smith in some sources. Also known by the alias Ziyon Yisrayah.) (February 6, 1954 – July 18, 1996), along with Resnover's brother Earl Resnover, were suspects sought after for two armed robberies and the August 1980 murder of 53-year-old Brink's Guard William Sieg.

After their arrests, the Resnover brothers and Smith were charged with the murders of Sergeant Ohrberg and Sieg. The trio was convicted and given long prison sentences for Sieg's murder. However, only Smith and Gregory Resnover were found guilty of Sergeant Ohrberg's murder, while Earl Resnover's charges were dismissed due to lack of evidence. Gregory was sentenced to death and executed by the electric chair on December 8, 1994, becoming Indiana's third and final judicial electrocution since 1976. Smith was also sentenced to death for his role in Sergeant Ohrberg's murder and was executed by lethal injection on July 18, 1996, becoming the first person to be executed by this method in Indiana.

== Background and murder ==
Mug shots of Smith (left) and Resnover (right)

On December 11, 1980, 44-year-old Indianapolis Police Sergeant Jack Robert Ohrberg and his colleagues – Sergeant Lewis J. Christ and Officers Ferguson and Foreman – went to a house in Indianapolis, attempting to serve a warrant of arrest on two to three suspects for a bank robbery and murder case. While Sergeant Ohrberg and his colleagues was carrying out his duties, gunshots were fired from inside the house, and Sergeant Ohrberg was down after sustaining several gunshot wounds. After a brief gunfight between the surviving policemen and the shooter(s), the suspected perpetrators, 26-year-old Tommie Joe Smith and a pair of brothers, 29-year-old Gregory Duane Resnover and 26-year-old Earl Resnover, stepped out of the house with two women, were arrested after the Resnovers surrendered while Smith, who was injured by the police, was found inside the house. At least two AR-15 rifles and a Smith and Wesson revolver were handed over to the police by the suspects.

At the time of his death, Sergeant Ohrberg was survived by his wife, four children and one grandson. An autopsy report by Dr. James A. Benz revealed that Sergeant Ohrberg died from multiple gunshot wounds caused by the AR-15 rifle(s), and Dr. Benz testified that one bullet injured Sergeant Ohrberg's abdomen and a blood vessel. Another bullet lodged in his back. A third bullet hit his left side, causing a rib fracture and some lung damage. There was 600 milliliters of blood in his abdominal cavity.

At the time of Sergeant Ohrberg's killing, the Resnover brothers and Smith were fugitives wanted for two armed robberies and another murder. The robberies were committed at the American Fletcher National Bank and K-Mart in February 1980 and August 1980 respectively. The murder took place on August 4, 1980, the same day when the trio robbed the K-Mart of $50,000, and the robbers had shot and killed 53-year-old Brink's Guard William E. Sieg Sr. (September 15, 1926 – August 4, 1980) during the same robbery. Additionally, while they were escaping after the February 1980 robbery, Gregory Resnover's gun went off and accidentally killed 26-year-old Aaron Resnover, who was also the brother of Gregory and Earl Resnover and the trio's accomplice in the robbery.

In October 1981, it was further revealed through investigations that the robberies were actually part of a plot by the Resnover brothers, Smith and their gang to gain monopoly and build their criminal empire (including prostitution, gambling and drugs) in the city, and the robberies were meant to gain money to fund their plan. Apart from this, the gang planned to supply firearms for themselves to facilitate the assassination of a local prosecutor named Stephen Goldsmith and the mass killing of police officers, but the plan fell through after the arrest of the Resnover brothers and Smith for the murder of Sergeant Ohrberg. Several other members of the gang were arrested after the trio's capture and charged in connection to the robberies committed by the alleged killers of Sergeant Ohrberg.

== Trials of the Resnover brothers and Smith ==
After their arrests, the Resnover brothers and Tommie Smith were charged with the murder of Sergeant Jack Ohrberg. However, the charges against one of the brothers, Earl Resnover, were dismissed due to insufficient evidence, and therefore, only the other brother, Gregory Resnover, and Tommie Smith, who were both the ones seen shooting at the police officers, remained facing murder charges for the death of Sergeant Ohrberg. The prosecution expressed their intention to seek the death penalty for the charges of murder against the men.

Both Smith and Resnover stood trial before a Marion County jury at the Marion County Superior Court. On June 29, 1981, the jury convicted the pair of one count of murder and one count of conspiracy to perpetuate murder. The next day, during the sentencing phase of the men's trial, the same jury recommended that both defendants shall be sentenced to death by the electric chair.

On July 23, 1981, Resnover and Smith were sentenced to death by Judge Jeffrey Boles for the charge of murdering Sergeant Ohrberg. The pair were each sentenced to an additional prison term of 50 years for the other charge of conspiracy to commit murder. An execution date of November 1, 1981, was set for both men, although it was stayed pending a mandated automatic appeal to the Indiana Supreme Court in relation to their conviction and sentence.

Aside from the case of Sergeant Ohrberg's killing, Resnover and Smith, as well as Resnover's brother Earl, were convicted of the killing of William Sieg Sr. in the Marion County Superior Court, and sentenced to a total of 80 years' imprisonment (60 years for murder and 20 years for robbery). The trio's appeals in this case were all dismissed by the Indiana Supreme Court in February 1985.

== Appeals and death row ==
=== Appeals of Resnover ===
On March 19, 1984, Gregory Resnover's appeal was rejected by the Indiana Supreme Court.

On October 1, 1984, the U.S. Supreme Court dismissed Resnover's appeal against his death sentence.

On May 27, 1987, the Indiana Supreme Court rejected a second appeal by Resnover. Resnover's death sentence was originally scheduled to be carried out on October 26, 1987, but the execution was delayed due to legal reasons.

On January 19, 1988, the U.S. Supreme Court dismissed the second appeal of Resnover against his death sentence.

On January 14, 1991, Resnover's appeal was rejected by U.S. District Judge Allen Sharp of the United States District Court for the Northern District of Indiana.

The 7th U.S. Circuit Court of Appeals dismissed Resnover's appeal on June 25, 1992.

On June 7, 1993, the U.S. Supreme Court once again rejected Resnover's appeal.

=== Appeals of Smith ===
On July 24, 1984, the Indiana Supreme Court turned down Tommie Smith's appeal.

In midst of appealing his death sentence, Smith was given an execution date of January 10, 1985, but his execution was delayed due to an appeal.

On December 16, 1987, the Indiana Supreme Court rejected Smith's second appeal.

On April 25, 1994, Smith's appeal was dismissed by the U.S. Supreme Court.

On July 5, 1995, Smith's appeal was denied by the 7th U.S. Circuit Court of Appeals.

=== Prison stabbing incident ===
In November 1984, Ernest Davis, who formerly belonged to the same gang as both Resnover and Smith, was attacked and stabbed minimally ten times by another prisoner hours after his transfer to the Indiana State Reformatory. It was suspected that the stabbing was solicited by Resnover and Smith out of revenge.

Back in February 1980, Davis had helped Resnover and Smith to commit the robbery at the American Fletcher National Bank, and as part of a plea agreement in exchange for a jail term of ten years, Davis testified against Resnover and Smith during their trials for the murders of William Sieg and Sergeant Jack Ohrberg. Davis's sister also supported this possibility and recounted her brother's fear of not getting out alive due to him turning state's evidence against the pair.

== Execution of Gregory Resnover ==
About 14 years after he murdered Sergeant Jack Ohrberg, Gregory Resnover received his death warrant, and his execution date was set on December 8, 1994.

The Indiana Catholic Conference made a public appeal for clemency from the Indiana governor, stating that the death penalty breached the sacredness and dignity of human life, and pushed for the commutation of Resnover's death sentence to life without parole. Subsequently, Governor Evan Bayh refused clemency for Resnover, after Bayh rejected the plea of Resnover's father that Resnover did not directly kill Sergeant Ohrberg despite firing the shots. In response, the lawyers of Resnover filed an appeal to challenge Bayh's decision to reject clemency, but the appeal was dismissed by Marion County judge Anthony J. Metz III. The Indiana Supreme Court also rejected Resnover's appeal during the final week before his execution.

During the final moments leading up to the execution, friends and family members of Resnover condemned his upcoming execution, stating that it was "vindictive, politically expedient and racially motivated", given that Resnover was African-American and there were allegations that Resnover was judged more harshly in the killing of a White police officer (Sergeant Ohrberg) in comparison to a White cop killer. Resnover's brother Dwight quoted in his own words, "It's just unfair, and there will be many more acts of unfairness." At the same time, the surviving family members and colleagues of Sergeant Ohrberg commemorated him and his life, stating that Ohrberg, who was born in Brooklyn to immigrants from Denmark, was a good father and police officer, and Ohrberg's daughter stated that her father often showed concern for her welfare and her brother's, while a former co-worker of Ohrberg stated that the victim was dutiful as an officer and insisted on going as the first in line to arrest Resnover and Smith for the killing of William Sieg.

On December 8, 1994, 43-year-old Gregory Duane Resnover was put to death by the electric chair at the Indiana State Prison. Prisons spokesperson Pam Pattison confirmed in a press conference that Resnover was pronounced dead at 12:13 a.m. According to Indianapolis police patroller John Correll, many police officers supported the execution, although members of the international human rights group Amnesty International protested against the execution. Resnover reportedly declined a last meal and made no final statement, and his teenage son was present to witness the execution. Just an hour before Resnover's execution, the Indiana Supreme Court blocked a lower court's ruling to approve videotaping of the execution by the American Civil Liberties Union (ACLU), which the group requested as video evidence to prove their contention that the electric chair amounted to "cruel and unusual punishment".

Resnover was the third convict executed in Indiana since the 1976 resumption of capital punishment, as well as the first in Indiana to be executed involuntarily after exhausting all avenues of appeal in more than 30 years. As of 2025, Resnover was the last person to be executed by the electric chair in Indiana.

== Execution of Tommie Smith ==
Two years after the execution of Gregory Resnover, his surviving accomplice on death row, Tommie Smith, was also notified of his death warrant, which scheduled his execution date as July 18, 1996. Originally, Smith was previously ordered to be executed on June 14, 1996, before a temporary stay of execution was issued by the U.S. Supreme Court pending a last-minute appeal.

In a final bid to escape the death sentence, Smith filed final appeals through his lawyers for a reprieve, but Governor Evan Bayh rejected his plea for clemency. On July 17, 1996, the eve of Smith's execution, his final appeal for a stay of execution was dismissed by the U.S. Supreme Court.

On July 18, 1996, 42-year-old Tommie J. Smith was put to death by lethal injection at the Indiana State Prison. In his last words, Smith said, "Let evil prevail where a good man does nothing.".

However, the execution did not go well, because the prison officials took 35 minutes to find a suitable vein or insert a needle on Smith's arms and chest, before they finally found one on the foot and inserted the needle, therefore commencing the execution procedure just before 1:00 a.m. Smith was finally pronounced dead at 1:23 a.m., about 80 minutes after leaving his prison cell and first entering the execution chamber.

Smith was the fourth inmate executed in Indiana since 1976, as well as the first prisoner executed by lethal injection in the state, after lethal injection was first introduced in 1995 to replace the electric chair as the only legal execution method in Indiana.

== See also ==
- Capital punishment in Indiana
- List of people executed in Indiana
- List of people executed in the United States in 1994
- List of people executed in the United States in 1996

Executions carried out in Indiana
Preceded by William Vandiver October 16, 1985	Gregory Resnover; December 8, 1994	Succeeded by Tommie Smith July 18, 1996
Executions carried out in the United States
Preceded by Herman Clark – Texas December 6, 1994	Gregory Resnover – Indiana; December 8, 1994	Succeeded by Raymond Kinnamon – Texas December 11, 1994
Executions carried out in Indiana
Preceded by Gregory Resnover December 8, 1994	Tommie Smith; July 18, 1996	Succeeded by Gary Burris November 20, 1997
Executions carried out in the United States
Preceded by Joseph Savino – Virginia July 17, 1996	Tommie Smith – Indiana; July 18, 1996	Succeeded by Fred Kornahrens – South Carolina July 19, 1996
