= List of people executed in Indiana =

The following is a list of people executed by the U.S. state of Indiana since its statehood.

A total of 24 people convicted of murder have been executed by the state of Indiana in the United States since the reinstatement of the death penalty in 1977. Before 1995, electrocution was the sole method of execution. This was replaced with lethal injection in 1995. The executions on this list are of those executed by the state government of Indiana; this list does not include persons executed within Indiana by the federal government. Two other people, Alton Coleman and Michael Lee Lockhart, were sentenced to death in Indiana, but were executed in Ohio and Texas respectively.

== List of people executed in Indiana since 1976 ==
No.	Name	Race	Age	Sex	Date of execution	County	Method	Victim(s)	Governor
1	Steven Timothy Judy	White	24	M	March 9, 1981	Morgan	Electrocution	4 murder victims (Note: The 4 victims were: Terry Chasteen, Misty Zollers, Stephen Chasteen, and Mark Chasteen.)	Robert D. Orr
2	William Earl Vandiver	White	37	M	October 16, 1985	Lake	Electrocution	Paul Komyatti	Robert D. Orr
3	Gregory Duane Resnover	Black	43	M	December 8, 1994	Marion	Electrocution	Indianapolis police Sergeant Jack R. Ohrberg	Evan Bayh
4	Tommie Joe Smith	Black	42	M	July 18, 1996	Marion	Lethal injection	Indianapolis police Sergeant Jack R. Ohrberg	Evan Bayh
5	Gary Burris	Black	40	M	November 20, 1997	Marion	Lethal injection	Kenneth Chambers	Frank O'Bannon
6	Robert Allan Smith	White	47	M	January 29, 1998	Sullivan	Lethal injection	Michael Wedmore	Frank O'Bannon
7	D. H. Fleenor	White	48	M	December 9, 1999	Johnson	Lethal injection	Bill Harlow and Nyla Harlow	Frank O'Bannon
8	Gerald Wayne Bivins	White	41	M	March 14, 2001	Boone	Lethal injection	William H. Radcliffe	Frank O'Bannon
9	James Lowery	White	54	M	June 27, 2001	Hendricks	Lethal injection	Mark Thompson and Gertrude Thompson	Frank O'Bannon
10	Kevin Lee Hough	White	43	M	May 2, 2003	Allen	Lethal injection	Ted Bosler and Gene Rubrake	Frank O'Bannon
11	Joseph L. Trueblood	White	46	M	June 13, 2003	Tippecanoe	Lethal injection	Susan Bowsher, Ashlyn Bowsher, and William Bowsher	Frank O'Bannon
12	Donald Ray Wallace Jr.	White	47	M	March 10, 2005	Vanderburgh	Lethal injection	4 murder victims (Note: The 4 victims were: Patrick Gilligan, Teresa Gilligan, Lisa Gilligan, and Gregory Gilligan.)	Mitch Daniels
13	William J. Benefiel Jr.	White	48	M	April 21, 2005	Vigo	Lethal injection	Delores Wells	Mitch Daniels
14	Gregory Scott Johnson	White	40	M	May 25, 2005	Madison	Lethal injection	Ruby Hutslar	Mitch Daniels
15	Kevin Aaron Conner	White	40	M	July 27, 2005	Marion	Lethal injection	Steven Wentland, Anthony Moore, and Bruce Voge	Mitch Daniels
16	Alan Lehman Matheney	White	54	M	September 28, 2005	St. Joseph	Lethal injection	Lisa Bianco	Mitch Daniels
17	Marvin Bieghler	White	58	M	January 27, 2006	Howard	Lethal injection	Tommy Miller and Kimberly Jane Miller	Mitch Daniels
18	David Leon Woods	White	42	M	May 4, 2007	DeKalb	Lethal injection	Juan Placencia	Mitch Daniels
19	Michael Allen Lambert	White	36	M	June 15, 2007	Delaware	Lethal injection	Muncie police officer Gregg William Winters	Mitch Daniels
20	Matthew Eric Wrinkles	White	49	M	December 11, 2009	Vanderburgh	Lethal injection	Debra Jean Wrinkles, Tony Fulkerson, and Natalie Fulkerson	Mitch Daniels
21	Joseph Edward Corcoran	White	49	M	December 18, 2024	Allen	Lethal injection	4 murder victims (Note: The 4 victims were: James Corcoran, Douglas A. Stillwell, Robert Scott Turner, and Timothy G. Bricker.)	Eric Holcomb
22	Benjamin Donnie Ritchie	White	45	M	May 20, 2025	Marion	Lethal injection	Beech Grove police officer William Ronald Toney	Mike Braun
23	Roy Lee Ward	White	53	M	October 10, 2025	Spencer	Lethal injection	Stacy Lynn Payne	Mike Braun
24	Jeffrey Allen Weisheit	White	50	M	November 5, 2026	Vanderburgh	Lethal injection	Alyssa Lynch and Caleb Lynch	Mike Braun

== Demographics ==
Race
White	21	88%
Black	3	13%
Age
20–29	1	4%
30–39	3	13%
40–49	15	63%
50–59	5	21%
Sex
Male	24	100%
Date of execution
1976–1979	0	0%
1980–1989	2	8%
1990–1999	5	21%
2000–2009	13	54%
2010–2019	0	0%
2020–2029	4	17%
Method
Lethal injection	21	88%
Electrocution	3	13%
Governor (Party)
Otis Bowen (R)	0	0%
Robert D. Orr (R)	2	8%
Evan Bayh (D)	2	8%
Frank O'Bannon (D)	7	29%
Joe Kernan (D)	0	0%
Mitch Daniels (R)	9	38%
Mike Pence (R)	0	0%
Eric Holcomb (R)	1	4%
Mike Braun (R)	3	13%
Total	24	100%

== See also ==
- Capital punishment in Indiana
- Capital punishment in the United States
- List of people executed in Indiana (pre-1972)
