= Benjamin Ritchie =

American convicted murderer (1980–2025)

- 2000 booking photo
- Born: Benjamin Donnie Peoples; May 3, 1980; Indiana, U.S.
- Died: May 20, 2025 (aged 45); Indiana State Prison, Indiana, U.S.
- Status: Executed by lethal injection
- Motive: To avoid arrest
- Convictions: Murder; Burglary; Auto theft; Unlawful possession of a firearm; Resisting arrest
- Penalty: Death (October 15, 2002)

Details
- Victims: William Ronald Toney, 31
- Date: September 29, 2000 c. 7 p.m (UTC−04:00)
- Location: Beech Grove, Indiana
- Weapon: 9 mm Glock handgun

Benjamin Donnie Ritchie (né Peoples; May 3, 1980 – May 20, 2025) was an American convicted murderer who shot and killed 31-year-old William Toney, a police officer from Beech Grove, Indiana, on September 29, 2000. Ritchie was arrested and charged with the murder of Toney and other offenses. He was subsequently sentenced to death on October 15, 2002, after his conviction on August 10 of that same year.

Ritchie appealed his death sentence, but he was unsuccessful in the regular appeals process. He cited bipolar disorder and cognitive impairments stemming from childhood abuse, personal drug use, and his mother's substance use during pregnancy as reasons for the Indiana Supreme Court to grant him the opportunity to file a successive post-conviction petition. However, it was denied, and the court instead granted the state's motion for an execution date. Ritchie was incarcerated at the Indiana State Prison and executed on May 20, 2025. Ritchie was featured in a two-series documentary of the Indiana State Prison by British journalist Sir Trevor McDonald.

== Early life ==
Benjamin Donnie Peoples was born on May 3, 1980. He never knew his biological father. His mother, Marion Martin, was a stripper who had abused alcohol and drugs even during the time she was pregnant with him and abandoned her son twice before he was three years old. His mother's husband, Donald Peoples, likewise abandoned him after taking custody of his two older half-brothers, and learning the truth that Ritchie was not related to him. Ritchie changed his surname after his adoption by Verna and Oscar Ritchie.

During his schooling years, Ritchie struggled with behavioral and academic issues, including repeating the first grade and dropping out in the ninth grade. He was also said to have undergone counseling from a minister from the third to fourth grade, and he also underwent treatment at Community North Hospital at age 10. He was also diagnosed with bipolar disorder and cognitive impairments, with the childhood abuse and substance abuse of his mother as likely causes of these conditions. In August 1998, Ritchie was found guilty of committing burglary, and by 2000, Ritchie was out of prison and placed under probation.

== Murder of William Toney ==
Photograph of William Toney

On September 29, 2000, Ritchie and two accomplices stole a white van from a local gas station in Beech Grove, Indiana. The vehicular theft was reported to the police. About two hours after the filing of the theft report, Beech Grove police officer Matthew "Matt" Hickey spotted the stolen vehicle while he was on the way to a traffic accident site. He pursued the van after receiving confirmation through radio that the van was the same one stolen from the gas station. Hickey was later joined by two other officers, Robert Mercuri and William Ronald Toney, in the pursuit.

Only Ritchie and one accomplice remained in the van while the officers were chasing them. After a short chase, the van pulled into the yard of a residential house, where the pair escaped the van and ran in opposite directions. Ritchie's accomplice, 20-year-old Michael Greer, was caught by Officer Hickey. 31-year-old Officer William Toney continued to pursue Ritchie on foot. Subsequently, Ritchie brandished a handgun and shot him four times. One of the shots penetrated Toney's upper chest above his bulletproof vest, resulting in his death. He had been a policeman for two years.

The next day, Ritchie was arrested at the home of his friend Michael Moody, who was the third person involved in the theft of the van.

== Trial ==
=== Charges and pre-trial developments ===
After his arrest, Benjamin Ritchie was charged with the murder of William Toney. Marion County Prosecutor Scott Newman confirmed in November 2000 that he would seek the death penalty for Ritchie. Before the start of the trial, a gag order was put in place by a judge to bar the police and legal professionals related to the case from discussing it outside the court. This was done in light of a media interview in which Ritchie claimed he accidentally killed Officer Toney, a story which was supported by a friend.

Originally, Michael Greer, Ritchie's accomplice in the van theft, was also charged with murder. As part of a plea bargain, Greer was later convicted of assisting a criminal, theft, and trespassing. He also agreed to testify against Ritchie. Greer faced the maximum sentence of eight years in prison for the lesser charges he pled guilty to, and was set to be sentenced after the end of Ritchie's trial. Michael Moody, who was also involved in the theft of the van, was convicted of auto theft and carrying an unlicensed handgun, and faced the maximum punishment of four years in prison.

A month before Ritchie's trial began, his lawyers appealed to the state courts and argued that Ritchie should not be put to death. This motion was filed in light of Ring v. Arizona, a 2002 landmark ruling by the U.S. Supreme Court, which ruled that only juries, not judges, can sentence offenders to death. Ritchie's lawyers submitted that the death penalty should be taken off the table in their client's case and claimed that the death penalty statutes of Indiana were unconstitutional for enabling judges the right to impose death sentences via judicial override when a jury remains undecided on sentence. Subsequently, Marion County judge Patricia Gifford ruled that this aspect of Indiana's capital punishment law was unconstitutional but did not dispute the general constitutionality of the death penalty as a whole, allowing the death penalty to remain available as a sentencing option in Ritchie's trial, stating that a defendant's right to a fair trial could still be protected.

=== Conviction and sentencing ===
On August 5, 2002, Ritchie stood trial before a jury at the Marion County Superior Court, with jury selection taking place on July 31, 2002. The pre-trial gag order issued in Ritchie's case expired on the first day of the trial. Greer appeared in court on the second day of the trial and testified against Ritchie.

On August 10, 2002, the jury found Ritchie guilty of the murder of Officer William Toney, as well as auto theft, carrying an unlicensed firearm and resisting arrest. In their arguments against the death penalty, the defense said that Ritchie suffered from mental disabilities caused either by a past head injury or his mother's pre-natal substance abuse, and that his tragic upbringing was not his voluntary life choice, and he thus deserved judicial mercy. The prosecution, however, refuted that no amount of suffering Ritchie went through could be an excuse for his actions and added that there were many people who had had traumatic experiences similar to Ritchie's but did not grow up to become cop killers.

On August 14, 2002, the jury returned with their sentence after more than three hours of deliberation, unanimously sentencing Ritchie to death for the most serious charge of murder. Ritchie reportedly laughed at the verdict.

On October 15, 2002, 22-year-old Benjamin Donnie Ritchie was formally sentenced to death by Marion County Superior Court Judge Patricia Gifford. Prior to Ritchie's sentencing, Officer Toney's widow was allowed to give a victim impact statement, and she addressed Ritchie in court, saying that she knew he was not sorry for his actions, he was a coward for killing her husband, and that she hoped he would be miserable for the rest of his life in prison until his execution.

== Death row ==
After he was first condemned to death row in 2002, Benjamin Ritchie was incarcerated at Indiana State Prison, the state's designated facility for male death row inmates. A January 2014 report revealed that Ritchie was one of the 11 death row inmates awaiting execution in Indiana. The death row population in Indiana later fell to eight in July 2020, with Ritchie being one of them.

In 2024, it was revealed that during his incarceration, Ritchie had a four-year relationship with a Swedish woman, who reportedly fell in love with Ritchie after first seeing him in a crime documentary and even travelled to the United States to visit him. According to Ritchie's former girlfriend, there was a secret plan for them to ensure Ritchie's escape from prison but it was aborted as Ritchie did not want his then girlfriend to risk her life. After the end of her relationship with Ritchie, the woman turned to drugs for a period of time before she moved on and became a mother to one daughter.

=== Appeal process ===
On May 25, 2004, the Indiana Supreme Court rejected Ritchie's direct appeal against his death sentence.

On November 8, 2007, the Indiana Supreme Court rejected Ritchie's second appeal. In his appeal, Ritchie alleged that he received ineffective legal representation.

On April 17, 2017, the U.S. Supreme Court dismissed Ritchie's final appeal.

=== Death warrant ===
==== Scheduling of execution date ====
On September 27, 2024, the Indiana Attorney General Todd Rokita filed a motion to the Indiana Supreme Court to schedule an execution date for Ritchie. The application was submitted just two weeks after Joseph Corcoran, a convicted mass murderer and fellow death row inmate from Indiana, was assigned an execution date of December 18, 2024. At the time, Ritchie was the second inmate in line for imminent execution in the state. Indiana's death row housed only eight individuals then, and four of them, including both Corcoran and Ritchie, had exhausted all available appeals. The court also set dates for both sides to file submissions. In response to the pending death warrant, Ritchie's counsel argued that he was represented by ineffective legal counsel during the original trial, and that his trial lawyers failed to investigate whether Ritchie suffered from fetal alcohol spectrum disorders as well as childhood lead exposure. As of June 2024, Ritchie was the only death row inmate in Indiana convicted of murdering a law enforcement officer, and two more individuals were pending trial for such crimes, with both facing the possibility of capital punishment.

While legal proceedings over Ritchie's pending death warrant were still underway, Indiana authorities proceeded with the execution of Corcoran by lethal injection on December 18, 2024, officially ending the state's 15-year moratorium on capital punishment, which was caused by the state's lack of drug supplies to facilitate lethal injection executions and the refusal of drug manufacturers to sell their products for the purposes of carrying out death sentences.

==== 2025 death warrant ====
On April 15, 2025, after hearing the case for seven months, the Indiana Supreme Court rejected Ritchie's motion for post-conviction relief and by a divided ruling, also scheduled an execution date for Ritchie, ordering his death sentence to be carried out before dawn on May 20, 2025.

In a written decision penned by Chief Justice Loretta Rush, Justice Geoffrey G. Slaughter cited in the majority judgment that their assessment of further evidence of Ritchie's cognitive impairments concluded that they would not have affected the decision of the jury. However, Rush dissented in the decision, citing that there was possibility of Ritchie suffering from fetal alcohol spectrum disorder when he committed his crimes, and it should be determined whether Ritchie was denied effective legal representation before a date of execution could be set.

=== Clemency hearing ===
On April 28, 2025, two clemency hearings were scheduled for Ritchie on May 5 and 12, 2025, respectively. Ritchie had signed a clemency petition dated April 22, 2025, and submitted it to the state parole board. Under Indiana state law, the Indiana governor had the right to refuse or grant clemency after deliberating the state parole board's recommendation.

On May 5, 2025, at the first hearing before a five-member panel of the Indiana's Parole Board, Ritchie expressed remorse for his crime and apologized for the murder of William Toney, and stated that he was no longer the same person who had killed Toney in cold blood, and he wanted to make good use of his second chance if his death sentence was reduced to life imprisonment.

On May 12, 2025, a second clemency hearing was held before the board, and during the session, family members and friends of the murdered officer, William Toney, urged the board to refuse clemency for Ritchie and conduct his execution as originally scheduled.

On May 14, 2025, the board denied Ritchie's request to commute his sentence to life imprisonment, and Indiana Governor Mike Braun likewise declined to grant clemency in accordance with the board's decision.

=== U.S. Supreme Court appeal ===
Apart from his clemency petitions, Ritchie also appealed to the U.S. Supreme Court to delay his execution. The appeal was rejected on May 19, 2025, the eve of the execution.

A separate appeal filed to the 7th U.S. Circuit Court of Appeals was also rejected on May 18, 2025.

== Execution ==
On May 20, 2025, 45-year-old Ritchie was put to death by lethal injection at the Indiana State Prison before dawn. On the same day, Texas executed Matthew Lee Johnson for the 2012 burning death of Nancy Harris during a robbery.

According to the Indiana Department of Corrections, the execution procedure commenced shortly after midnight. At 12:46 AM Ritchie was pronounced dead after he was administered a single dose of pentobarbital. For his last meal, Ritchie requested the "Tour of Italy" meal from Olive Garden, which includes fettuccine alfredo, lasagna, and chicken parmigiana. His last words were: "I Love My Family, my friends, and all the support I've gotten. I hope they all find peace."

== Aftermath ==
Following Toney's death more than 600 people, including family, friends and colleagues (including Beech Grove Police Chief Michael Curran) attended his funeral in the Washington Park East Cemetery. The police officers involved in the investigation of William Toney's murder were all commended and awarded for their efforts in the case.

In October 2000, several Papa John's restaurants set up a donation fund for the children of Toney, with each restaurant contributing 5% of their profits to the fund. In November 2000, a benefit concert was held by local singers and bands to help the bereaved kin of Officer Toney. The same month, a local businessman also donated $1,000 to Toney's family. In March 2001, a special party event was conducted on St. Patrick's Day as a gesture to raise donations to Toney's widow and daughters.

In 2013, Ritchie appeared in a crime documentary titled Inside Death Row. The show, hosted by Sir Trevor McDonald, covered the lives of prisoners on death row in Indiana, including Ritchie. This show was followed by a second season of the documentary in 2018, in which Ritchie would re-appear. Reportedly, Toney's widow remarried a family friend of her first husband and later had a son.

== See also ==
- Capital punishment in Indiana
- List of people executed in Indiana
- List of people executed in the United States in 2025

Executions carried out in Indiana
Preceded by Joseph Corcoran December 18, 2024	Benjamin Ritchie; May 20, 2025	Succeeded by Roy Lee Ward October 10, 2025
Executions carried out in the United States
Preceded by Glen Edward Rogers – Florida May 15, 2025	Benjamin Ritchie – Indiana; May 20, 2025	Succeeded by Matthew Johnson – Texas May 20, 2025
