= Lake County Superior Courthouse (demolished) =

Historic building in Indiana, U.S.

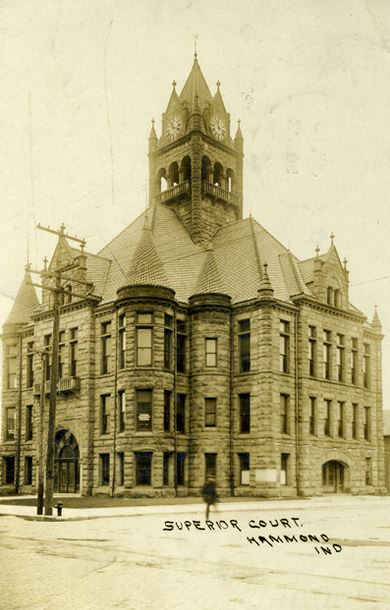
- Courthouse seen on July 13, 1908.
- Interactive map of the Lake County Superior Courthouse area

General information
- Status: Demolished
- Type: Courthouse
- Location: Hammond, Indiana
- Coordinates: 41°37′5.2″N 87°31′20.2″W
- Opened: 1903
- Demolished: 1974

Technical details
- Floor count: 4

Design and construction
- Architect: Joseph Tristan Hutton

The Lake County Superior Courthouse was the original building for the superior court of Lake County, located in northwest Indiana. It was built in 1903 in downtown Hammond, Indiana by architect Joseph Tristan Hutton. The courthouse was located on the corner of Hohman Avenue and Rimbach Street. It was demolished in 1974, to be replaced with a parking lot.
