= Joseph Corcoran =

American mass murderer

- August 1999 mugshot of Corcoran
- Born: April 18, 1975; Fort Wayne, Indiana, U.S.
- Died: December 18, 2024 (aged 49); Indiana State Prison, Indiana, U.S.
- Parent(s): Jackie Corcoran, Father Katherine Corcoran, Mother
- Status: Executed by lethal injection
- Motive: Unknown
- Conviction: Murder (4 counts)
- Penalty: Death (August 26, 1999)

Details
- Victims: 4 convicted, 6 total suspected
- Date: April 14, 1992 – July 26, 1997
- Locations: Steuben County, Indiana (1992; suspected); Fort Wayne, Indiana (1997; confirmed)
- Imprisoned at: Indiana State Prison

Joseph Edward Corcoran (April 18, 1975 – December 18, 2024) was an American convicted mass murderer and suspected serial killer who was executed for a quadruple murder case in Indiana. Corcoran was found guilty of the 1997 murders of his brother, his sister's fiancé, and two of their friends at his house in Fort Wayne, Indiana, and he was sentenced to death in 1999. Corcoran was previously charged in 1992 with murdering his parents when he was nearly seventeen years old, but he was acquitted of all the charges. Corcoran, who had since exhausted all avenues of appeal against his sentence, was executed on December 18, 2024. Corcoran was the first person in Indiana to be executed after the state's 15-year moratorium on executions.

== Early life ==
Born in Fort Wayne, Indiana, on April 18, 1975, Joseph Corcoran grew up in Hamilton, where he lived with his father, Jack "Jackie" Corcoran, his mother, Kathryn Corcoran, his two sisters, and his brother, James Corcoran. He was the youngest of the four children. They would eventually move to Ball Lake in Steuben County. Corcoran's father was a former Marine who worked in an electronics company after his military discharge. His mother Kathryn, a homemaker, worked as a nursing aid in Fort Wayne in the 1980s and also went to business school.

Corcoran, who went to Hamilton Junior-Senior High School during his adolescent years, reportedly did not have a good relationship with his parents, who he believed were too strict with him. He also had a strained relationship with his brother James, who would often belittle him. However, because of James' service as a Marine, Corcoran still admired him. It was also stated that Corcoran was a loner with no friends despite his "movie star-like" looks, according to his neighbors and family.

In April 1992, during his sophomore year of high school, he was indicted for the double murder of his parents, but was acquitted of all charges. He would later drop out of high school at age 17. Afterwards, Corcoran worked as a machine operator in New Haven.

Corcoran reportedly was not academically inclined in school. Despite his intelligence and quick grasp of electronics and their inner workings, Corcoran struggled in his school work. By the time he dropped out, he attained a C average for his previous grades. Additionally, Corcoran had a hobby of making explosives and collecting guns. During his late teens and early 20s, Corcoran would successfully create and detonate several small explosives in the forest. By the age of 22, Corcoran had amassed a collection of 32 types of firearms, mostly rifles, shotguns, and handguns.

== 1992 murders of Jack and Kathryn Corcoran ==
On April 14, 1992, four days short of reaching his 17th birthday, Joseph Corcoran allegedly murdered his parents – 53-year-old Jack Edward Corcoran and 47-year-old Kathryn Mishler Corcoran.

At around 8.30am, Corcoran's parents were found dead inside their Ball Lake home at Steuben County, Indiana, sustaining wounds caused by a shotgun. Evidence showed that Corcoran likely murdered his parents with a 12-gauge shotgun. He allegedly believed they were too strict with him, had sold a car he thought would belong to him, burned his music tapes, and made him go to church. The timing of the discovery of his parents' bodies was an hour after Corcoran boarded the school bus to school. His friends had testified that Corcoran had offered them $200 and a shotgun to kill his parents, and their conversations revolved around killing people and animals. However, the evidence against Corcoran was circumstantial and no direct evidence was found to prove Corcoran guilty of the double murder.

On November 16, 1992, after a five-day trial, Corcoran was acquitted after the jury found insufficient evidence to convict him of the murders of his parents. According to Kim Corcoran, one of Corcoran's two sisters, Corcoran was relieved with the acquittal and wanted to complete high school and join the Marines like his father. The case remains unsolved, even though it remains open for routine re-investigations.

During the next five years after his acquittal, Corcoran, who never completed his high school education, went to live with his siblings, who helped him find various jobs, including as a dishwasher and cook.

After Corcoran was arrested for the 1997 quadruple murder, it was revealed that the jurors of his 1992 trial were convinced that Corcoran was guilty to an extent for planning or committing the murders of his parents. They were unable to decide on his guilt since the evidence was all circumstantial, and there was an absence of direct witnesses and murder weapons, so the jury returned a majority verdict of not guilty. One juror voted guilty.

== 1997 Fort Wayne quadruple murders ==
On July 26, 1997, five years after allegedly killing his parents, Joseph Corcoran committed the quadruple murder of his brother and three other men.

Corcoran was inside his house in Fort Wayne, Indiana with his 30-year-old brother James Edward Corcoran. They shared the house with their sister Kelly Nieto and her 32-year-old fiancé Robert Scott Turner. Friends 30-year-old Timothy Gail Bricker and 30-year-old Douglas Alan Stillwell were also inside the house that day. Corcoran's sister was absent from home and at a nearby store at that time.

According to court and media sources, James, his friends, and Turner were together in the living room, watching television and eating pizza. Corcoran, who was upstairs on the second floor, purportedly overheard the four men talking about him in the living room. Prosecutors claim Corcoran overheard those in the living room talking about his alleged involvement in the murder of his parents. Enraged at this, Corcoran confronted the men with a gun. Before he did so, Corcoran took his seven-year-old niece into an upstairs bedroom to protect her from the gunfire and then loaded a semi-automatic rifle and moved to the living room with the weapon. Corcoran shot his brother, Turner, and Bricker. Stillwell was able to evade the initial onslaught and attempted to escape, but Corcoran shot and killed Stillwell before he could leave the house.

After murdering the four men, Corcoran stepped out of the house and asked a neighbor to call the police. When the police arrived, they found the bodies of the four men, and found Corcoran's niece unharmed inside her bedroom. Authorities also discovered about 20 to 30 weapons inside the attic of Corcoran's house.

When Corcoran's sister received word of the murders, she told the press that the truth of Corcoran murdering her other brother and fiancé made her view the murders of her parents in a completely different light. She was now certain that Corcoran was guilty of their parents' murders in 1992. Previously, she and James had defended him fiercely in court. Corcoran's sister stated that she cried over the case and blamed Corcoran for ruining her life with the loss of their parents and James.

The 1997 Fort Wayne murders were among the most infamous mass murder cases to occur in Indiana.

== 1999 trial and sentencing ==
On July 28, 1997, two days after the Fort Wayne murders, 22-year-old Joseph Corcoran was arraigned in court on four counts of murder, one for each of his victims. The offense of murder with aggravating circumstances carries the death penalty or life in prison under Indiana state law.

Corcoran eventually stood trial before a jury at the Allen County Superior Court. Corcoran's defense counsel John Nimmo expressed the belief that Corcoran was guilty before the start of trial.

On May 22, 1999, Corcoran was found guilty of murder on all four counts. The jury returned with their verdict two days later, unanimously recommending Corcoran receive four death sentences for the four killings.

On August 26, 1999, Corcoran was sentenced to death for all four counts of murder by Allen County Superior Judge Fran Gull.

== Appeal processes ==
On December 6, 2000, the Indiana Supreme Court heard Joseph Corcoran's appeal, and while they upheld the murder conviction, the court vacated the four death sentences in Corcoran's case and directed the original trial judge Fran Gull to re-sentence Corcoran, since it was alleged that Gull considered non-statutory aggravating factors in her sentencing decision.

Gull re-sentenced Corcoran to death for all four charges of murder, stating that the psychiatric evidence of Corcoran's disorders did not hinder him from having the capability to recognize the magnitude of his heinous acts and it did not impair his mental responsibility at the time of the murders, and the balance of aggravating and mitigating factors inclined her to re-impose the death penalty for Corcoran. On September 5, 2002, the Indiana Supreme Court affirmed Gull's decision rejected Corcoran's appeal.

Corcoran appealed twice to the Indiana Supreme Court on January 11 and May 12, 2005, both were rejected. Corcoran was initially scheduled for execution on July 21, 2005, the execution was delayed due to ongoing appeals.

On April 18, 2006, a fifth appeal to the Indiana Supreme Court was rejected.

On April 9, 2007, the U.S. District Court for the Northern District of Indiana vacated the death sentences of Corcoran after finding that his constitutional rights were violated when Allen County Prosecutor Robert Gevers had pursued the death penalty when Corcoran rejected both a bench trial and a plea deal to take the death penalty off the table while favoring the option of a jury trial for sentencing. On December 31, 2008, the 7th Circuit Court of Appeals allowed the death sentence to stand in Corcoran's case, after they accepted the appeal of the prosecution and cited that Corcoran's rights were not violated since it was constitutionally permissible for Gevers to pursue a harsher punishment irrespective to the presence or absence of a plea deal and bench trial. This decision, however, was overturned by the U.S. Supreme Court on October 20, 2009, after they directed the lower federal courts to re-hear certain arguments of Corcoran's defense counsel.

Upon re-hearing on January 27, 2010, the 7th U.S. Circuit Court of Appeals ordered Corcoran's death sentence to be overturned and a new re-sentencing trial should be granted, after finding that the original trial judge had improperly considered aggravating factors not set out in state law, but the death penalty was once again restored for Corcoran on November 12, 2010, after the U.S. Supreme Court ruled that the 7th U.S. Circuit Court of Appeals erred in overturning the death penalty on the basis that federal courts in the capital appellate process should only consider federal law whilst state law is within the purview of the state court system.

On June 23, 2011, Corcoran's second appeal to the 7th Circuit Court of Appeals was rejected.

On January 10, 2013, the U.S. District Court for the Northern District of Indiana rejected Corcoran's appeal.

On April 14, 2015, the 7th Circuit Court of Appeals turned down another appeal from Corcoran.

On July 8, 2016, Corcoran's final appeal was rejected by the U.S. Supreme Court, resulting in Corcoran exhausting all avenues of appeal.

== Death row ==
After being sentenced in 1999, Joseph Corcoran spent more than two decades on death row at Indiana State Prison while his appeals against the death penalty, which had been vacated more than once before its re-instatement, were ongoing. At the time of Corcoran's sentencing in 1999, 45 death row inmates were on death row at Indiana State Prison. Since then, 14 inmates had been executed between 1999 and 2009, before Corcoran himself was put to death in 2024.

By January 2014, Corcoran was one of the 11 death row inmates awaiting execution in Indiana, not including Debra Brown, the female accomplice of serial killer Alton Coleman, who was serving a life sentence in Ohio despite receiving the death penalty in Indiana state jurisdiction (which was later commuted in 2018).

The death row population in Indiana later fell to eight in July 2020, with Corcoran still included in the death row list of Indiana at that point. As of June 2024, when the state was in the process of scheduling Corcoran's execution date, Corcoran was one of the four inmates on death row who had exhausted all avenues of appeal, with the death row population still remaining at eight in total, given that no new death sentences were imposed by the courts since 2014.

=== Death warrant in 2024 ===
On June 26, 2024, the Attorney General Todd Rokita announced that he would be filing a motion to the Indiana Supreme Court, seeking an execution date for Corcoran, after the state was able to purchase the drugs required for lethal injection executions. At the time when the appeal was launched, a moratorium was in effect for 15 years on all pending executions in Indiana since the 2009 execution of Matthew Eric Wrinkles for a triple murder case.

The state authorities confirmed that for all subsequent executions in Indiana, including Corcoran's, they would be deploying the use of pentobarbital to execute condemned criminals with a single drug lethal injection. Indiana's governor Eric Holcomb defended the decision of the state to restart executions, stating that he supported the application of the death penalty for heinous crimes and justice should be served. Holcomb quoted, "When such evil is on display, I personally believe in this." Corcoran still had the final recourse to appeal for clemency from the governor to commute his death sentence to life imprisonment; there were only three cases of clemency being granted to the condemned in Indiana since the resumption of capital punishment in the U.S. in 1976.

Corcoran's lawyers opposed authorizing the death warrant of Corcoran. Describing the 1997 Fort Wayne murders as "an unspeakable tragedy took the lives of four people who unquestionably deserved to live", the lawyers argued that Corcoran's death sentence should not be carried out on the grounds that he had been mentally ill, and suffered from paranoid schizophrenia for the past several years, and they revealed that Corcoran's symptoms persisted while on death row, including his delusions of being tortured daily by prison guards with an ultrasound machine, his conversations with people whom he saw only in his hallucinations, and his delusions of having an involuntary speech disorder. The opposition to the state's lethal injection protocols was another ground of appeal by Corcoran's counsel to oppose the approval of his death warrant.

On September 11, 2024, the Indiana Supreme Court approved the death warrant of Corcoran, scheduling him to be executed before dawn on December 18, 2024. Corcoran's execution date was the first to be scheduled in 15 years after the state's last execution in 2009.

In response to Corcoran's death warrant, his sister Kelly Ernst, who lost her fiancé and other brother to Corcoran's murderous spree in 1997, stated that she would not attend the execution, and did not personally feel that the execution of her remaining brother would bring her closure, given that she did not support capital punishment. Ernst, who declined to discuss whether she believed Corcoran murdered their parents, said that she could not sleep for weeks after receiving notice of her brother's execution order, and Ernst added that after cutting off contact with Corcoran for more than a decade before she contacted him again, she believed that Corcoran was mentally ill. Ernst, who had since married another man, also revealed that she had forgiven Corcoran for murdering their brother and her late fiancé, adding that she regretted not knowing earlier about the psychiatric conditions of her brother due to her being too absorbed by her grief and anger. As for Adam Bricker, the brother of Timothy Bricker (one of the four victims of Corcoran's killing spree), he did not comment whether he supported life without parole or the death penalty for Corcoran. Adam said that as a Christian, he did not wish for anybody to die, but the law had to run its course.

It was reported that no media witnesses would be allowed to attend the execution of Corcoran. Indiana laws forbid the attendance of media witnesses of executions, and this came under scrutiny as opponents of capital punishment argued that media witnesses should be allowed to witness the execution and provide factual accounts of the process and procedure to ensure fairness in reporting the details of an inmate's execution.

=== Final appeals and clemency petition ===
Corcoran's lawyers confirmed on September 30 that they would be petitioning for clemency from the governor. On October 25, 2024, Corcoran's counsel appealed to the Indiana Supreme Court to overturn a previous ruling that barred him from seeking post-conviction relief in state courts, which was issued due to Corcoran failing to meet the deadline nearly two decades ago in seeking post-conviction review.

On November 15, 2024, Corcoran's lawyers petitioned for a stay of execution, stating that it was cruel and unusual punishment to execute Corcoran due to the fact that he had severe paranoid schizophrenia and could not differentiate between reality and fantasy and hence, it should be sufficient basis to overturn Corcoran's death sentence.

While Corcoran's lawyers were filing their final appeals to the courts, they also drafted a clemency petition to the Indiana Parole Board, but the petition did not go forward as Corcoran reportedly did not sign it, out of his personal intention to die. Corcoran's lawyers argued that Corcoran was not competent enough to be executed and made use of Corcoran's refusal to sign the petition to support their argument that Corcoran believed his death could free him of his mental illness, which purportedly prevented him from making rational decisions to fight his death sentence. They also stated that Corcoran's execution should be delayed for a review of his mental competency for execution.

On December 5, 2024, the Indiana Supreme Court dismissed the appeal of Corcoran. Reportedly, despite the intention of his counsel to continue appeal against his death sentence, Corcoran wrote a letter to the judges, expressing his intention to not appeal or postpone his execution further. Corcoran said he accepted responsibility for his actions and he accepted the appellate courts' stance in his case. At the same time, Bob Morris, a state politician, asked to delay the execution of Corcoran and submitted a petition to repeal the death penalty.

Five days after rejecting the appeal of Corcoran, the full grounds of decision by the Indiana Supreme Court was published. In a majority decision of 3–2, the judges found that the lawyers did not submit new evidence to prove that Corcoran was mentally incompetent for execution and this issue was repeatedly litigated for years, but the courts did not accept these claims. They noted that Corcoran did not personally file the appeal (which his lawyers took responsibility for due to his claimed diminished capacity) and did not wish to proceed with further litigation to delay his death sentence, and hence they would not for any reason approve the appeal. The three concurring judges stated that even if some evidence showed that Corcoran had an irrational understanding of his crimes, he had a clear and conscious understanding of his execution and impact of his offences, and hence they did not have incentive to stop the execution. On the other hand, the two dissenting judges said in their opinion that they would have granted Corcoran a short reprieve in favor of a brief mental competency hearing to determine his mental competency for execution on December 18, 2024.

Corcoran's lawyers brought the case further to the federal district court in Northern Indiana to oppose the impending execution of Corcoran. However, Judge Jon DeGuilio rejected the appeal on December 13, 2024.

On December 16, 2024, Corcoran's appeal to the 7th Circuit Court of Appeals was rejected via a majority decision of 2–1. In the majority judgement, the concurring judges took into consideration that Corcoran had earlier emphasized in his personal letter that he did not wish to pursue further pleas for reprieve and he had also asked the courts to not allow his counsel's attempt to stop the execution. The majority judgement also detailed that Corcoran was being found mentally competent in prior psychiatric tests and therefore, they chose to uphold the death sentence.

The U.S. Supreme Court dismissed Corcoran's final appeal on December 17, 2024, the eve of Corcoran's execution.

As a final recourse to escape the death penalty, Corcoran's lawyers and his supporters submitted a clemency plea to Governor Eric Holcomb, who had the power to commute Corcoran's death sentence to life imprisonment. Holcomb did not grant clemency.

== Execution ==
Early on the morning of December 18, 2024, Corcoran was executed by lethal injection at the Indiana State Prison. He was pronounced dead at 12:44 am CST, eight minutes after he received a single dose of pentobarbital. No media attendees were permitted, although Corcoran chose a reporter with the Indiana Capital Chronicle as one of his witnesses.

Corcoran reportedly requested ice cream from Ben & Jerry's for his last meal. He was granted a final meeting with his family, including his wife Tahina, whom he married while in prison. His last words were "Not really. Let's get this over with."

Corcoran was the first condemned inmate to be executed in Indiana after a 15-year moratorium on executions since 2009. He was the 24th death row prisoner to have his death sentence carried out in the U.S. in 2024.

After the execution of Corcoran, Governor Eric Holcomb released a media statement, expressing his support for Corcoran's death sentence, "Joseph Corcoran's case has been reviewed repeatedly over the last 25 years – including 7 times by the Indiana Supreme Court and 3 times by the U.S. Supreme Court, the most recent of which was tonight. His sentence has never been overturned and was carried out as ordered by the court." Indiana Attorney General Todd Rokita, in his own media statement, stated that Corcoran "finally paid his debt to society as justice was provided to his victims."

== See also ==
- Capital punishment in Indiana
- List of people executed in Indiana
- List of people executed in the United States in 2024

Executions carried out in Indiana
Preceded by Matthew Wrinkles December 11, 2009	Joseph Corcoran; December 18, 2024	Succeeded by Benjamin Ritchie May 20, 2025
Executions carried out in the United States
Preceded by Christopher Collings – Missouri December 3, 2024	Joseph Corcoran – Indiana; December 18, 2024	Succeeded by Kevin Ray Underwood – Oklahoma December 19, 2024
