= Indiana State Prison =

Prison in Indiana, United States

Coordinates: 41°42′11″N 86°55′2″W

- Interactive map of Indiana State Prison
- Location: Michigan City, Indiana
- Status: open
- Security class: mixed
- Capacity: ~4000
- Opened: 1860; 166 years ago
- Managed by: Indiana Department of Correction

The Indiana State Prison is a maximum security Indiana Department of Correction prison for adult males; however, minimum security housing also exists on the confines. It is located in Michigan City, Indiana, about 50 miles (80 km) east of Chicago. The average daily inmate population in November 2006 was 2,200, 2,165 in 2011. The Indiana State Prison was established in 1860. It was the second state prison in Indiana. One of the most famous prisoners to be in the Michigan City prison was bank robber John Dillinger, who was released on parole in 1933.

The prison houses all the male death row inmates in the state. It appeared in the ITV documentary Inside Death Row with Trevor McDonald.

Indiana was planning to close the prison in Michigan City after a new prison opens in Westville. A more recent report says the prison will remain open.

== History ==
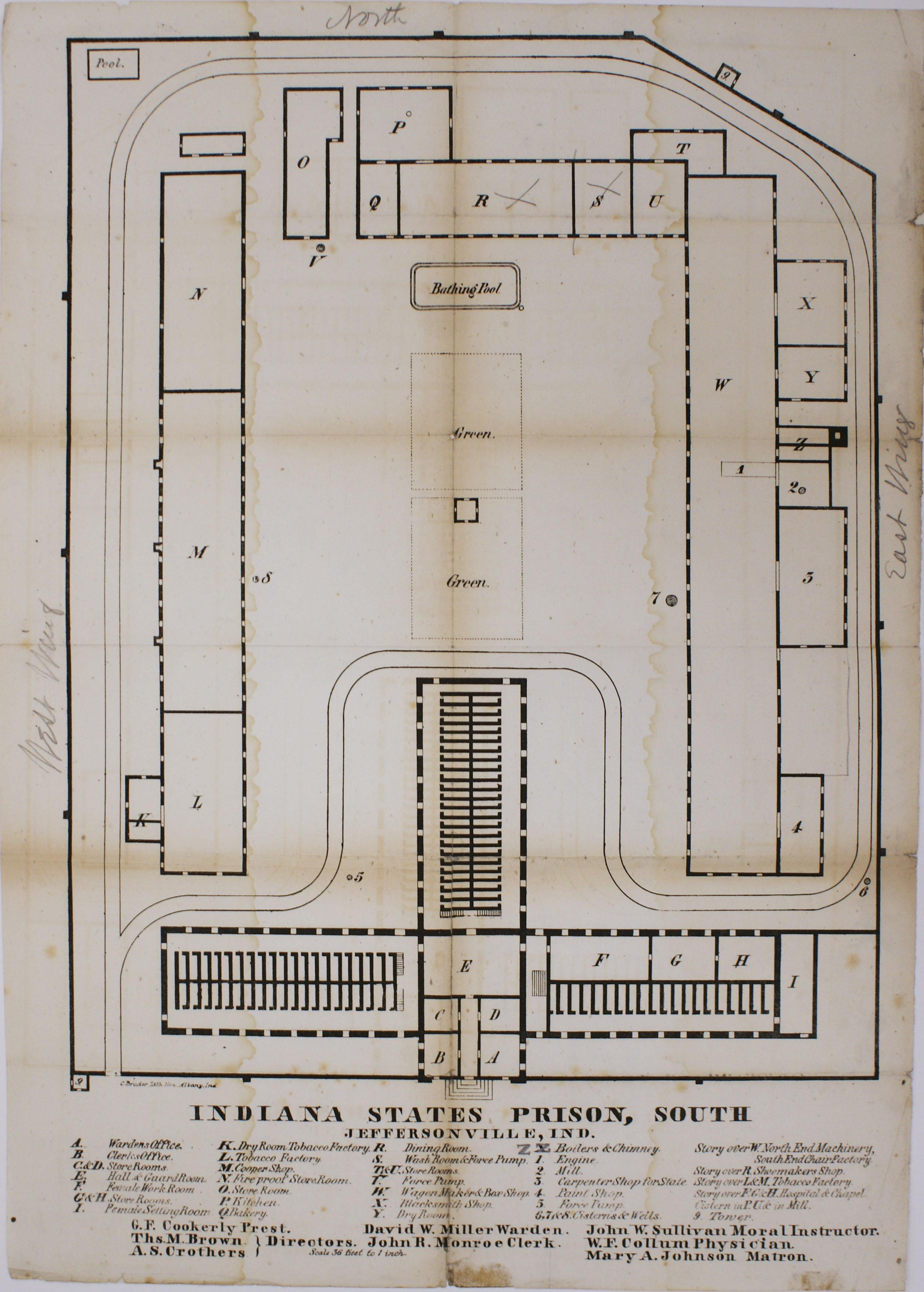
Layout of the original prison design, c. 1865

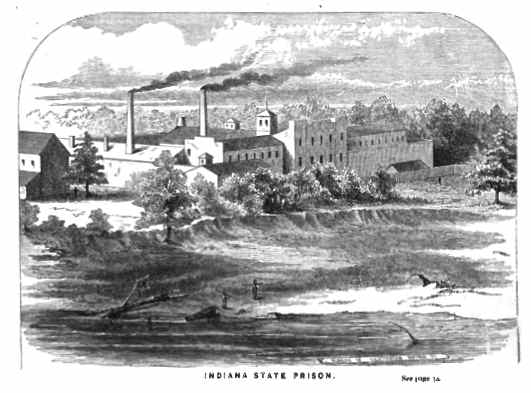
Illustration of Indiana State Prison, 1871

The history of the Indiana State Prison dates back to 1859 when the state legislature granted $50,000 for a new state prison. It was named "State Prison West"; as opposed to "State Prison East" which was the first state prison located in Jeffersonville, Indiana (and later moved to nearby Clarksville). The prison space at Jeffersonville became too scarce, calling for a new prison to be built in Michigan City. Later, State Prison South became the Indiana Reformatory and State Prison North became known as Indiana State Prison.

In 1860, 100 acres (0.40 km^{2}) in Michigan City were purchased for $4,500. The first warden, Charles Seely, was the superintendent in charge of construction and was the general handyman. The first building was the Temporary Prison Building which was 200 feet (61 m) long and made of red brick. A year after Michigan City Prison opened, prison labor outside of the institution started; inmates were employed at a cooperage firm making barrels, receiving 38 cents a day. The first prison school was started in 1861 where prisoners would learn from the chaplain five days a week. Later the prison started charging 25 cents per visitor to boost prison revenue.

At the turn of the century, the prison was increased to twice its size. By 1930 prisoners were placed in two cell houses that contained 230 and 340 cells respectively, and three dormitories, which were considered among the best in the country. During that same time period, 900 acres (3.6 km^{2}) of farmland were in use by the prison on land leased by the state. A hospital was built in 1943 that was almost 1,000 square feet (93 m^{2}). In the late 1950s, arguably one of the finest state recreational facilities was opened at the prison.

From 1960 to 1990, only minor renovations were implemented at the State Prison. In 1992, a new type of food door with locking capability for each cell was designed. A year later, the first hot meal was served in the dining room, and in that same year, the inmates received three meals a day for the first time. Soon thereafter, a new riot system was put into effect in Dormitories E and F.

Michigan City is known for having housed two famous inmates during its tenure. John Dillinger spent time in Michigan City from 1929 until he was paroled in 1933. A few months after Dillinger made parole, on September 26, ten inmates, including Harry Pierpont, Charles Makley, Russell Lee Clarke and Ed Shouse, escaped thanks to the help of three pistols Dillinger had smuggled into the prison.

The other especially famous inmate was D.C. Stephenson. In 1922 Stephenson became one of the most powerful Grand Dragons of the Ku Klux Klan. In 1925 he raped a woman named Madge Oberholtzer. She died a month later from either poison or bite marks from being raped. That same year he was convicted of second degree murder and was sent to the Indiana State Prison for 31 years.

Michigan City had a cemetery for prisoners when the prison first opened in 1860; however, that cemetery no longer exists. The new prison cemetery in Michigan City has around 350 prisoners buried on the premises. Sam Thomas was the first offender buried in the new cemetery on June 10, 1927.

Before 1913 all executions in Indiana were done by hanging. On February 20, 1914, the first electrocution occurred. From 1913 to 1994 executions were performed via electric chair. Lethal injection has been used in Indiana from 1995 up to the present. Currently all state executions must be carried out in the Indiana State Prison. The prison also has or had a cat adoption program. This program has been exceptionally successful at finding new homes for felines previously owned by prison inmates.

In 2017 and 2023 two inmates (Joshua Devine and Michael Smith) burned alive in their cells and died. The prison has no sprinkler system and will not be retrofitted with one. It was supposed to be closed in 2027 however Indiana has decided it will remain open indefinitely citing need for more beds.

== Notable inmates ==
=== Current ===
- William Clyde Gibson – Serial killer convicted of three murders. On death row.
- Eric Darnell Holmes – convicted of two murders. On death row.

=== Former ===
- Howard Allen – Serial killer convicted of three murders. Formerly on death row; sentence commuted. Died of natural causes in 2020.
- John Dillinger – Bank robber and gangster. Incarcerated at the Indiana Reformatory and Indiana State Prison between 1924 and 1933.
- Orville Lynn Majors – Serial killer and former nurse. Convicted of the murders of 6 patients. Died of heart failure in 2017.
- D.C. Stephenson – Convicted rapist and murderer. Grand Dragon of the Indiana Klan
- Mike Inik - Convicted mass shooter died in 1945

=== Executed ===
- Joseph Corcoran – Convicted killer found guilty of murdering his brother, his sister's fiancé and two friends in 1997. Executed via lethal injection on December 18, 2024.
- Steven Judy – Executed on March 9, 1981, via electric chair. The first person executed in Indiana since the reinstatement of the death penalty.
- Alan Matheney – Found guilty of the murder of his wife Lisa Bianco. Executed on September 28, 2005, via lethal injection.
- Gregory Duane Resnover – One of two men convicted of the 1980 murder of Indianapolis police officer Jack Ohrberg. Executed via the electric chair on December 8, 1994. Last person executed by electrocution in Indiana.
- Benjamin Ritchie – Convicted of murdering a police officer, executed on May 20, 2025.
- Tommie Joe Smith – One of two men convicted of the 1980 murder of Indianapolis police officer Jack Ohrberg. Executed via lethal injection on July 18, 1996. First person executed by lethal injection in Indiana.
- William Vandiver — found guilty of killing his father-in-law. Executed via the electric chair on October 16, 1985.
- Roy Lee Ward – Convicted of raping and murdering a teenage girl in 2001, executed on October 10, 2025.
- Matthew Eric Wrinkles – Executed on December 11, 2009, via lethal injection.
