= Capital punishment in Indiana =

Capital punishment is a legal penalty in the U.S. state of Indiana. The last person executed by the state of Indiana was Jeffery Allen Weisheit on November 5, 2026; Weisheit was convicted of the 2010 murders of Alyssa and Caleb Lynch.

The execution chamber, and men's death row are in Indiana State Prison. Indiana Women's Prison has housed women with death sentences.

Federal executions take place at the United States Penitentiary in Terre Haute, Indiana; these executions, however, are entirely separate and not under the control of the State of Indiana, but rather administered by the federal government based on federal convictions.

Previously Indiana law required female death row inmates (not about to be executed) to be held at Indiana State Prison even though it was a male facility.

== Legal process ==
When the prosecution seeks the death penalty, the sentence is decided by the jury and must be unanimous.

In case of a hung jury during the penalty phase of the trial, the judge decides the sentence.

Indiana was one of the four states (alongside Alabama, Delaware and Florida) that had allowed a judge to override a jury's recommendation of a life sentence to the death penalty or death penalty to a life sentence. The Indiana override statute was abolished in 2002.

The power of clemency belongs to the Governor of Indiana after receiving a non-binding advice from the Indiana Parole Board.

== Capital crimes ==
The following constitutes murder with aggravating circumstances, which is the only capital crime in Indiana.

1. The defendant committed the murder by intentionally killing the victim while committing or attempting to commit any of the following: arson, burglary, child molesting, criminal deviate conduct, kidnapping, rape, robbery, carjacking, criminal organization activity, dealing in cocaine or narcotic drug, or criminal confinement.
2. The defendant committed the murder by the unlawful detonation of an explosive with intent to injure a person or damage property.
3. The defendant committed the murder by lying in wait.
4. The defendant who committed the murder was hired to kill.
5. The defendant committed the murder by hiring another person to kill.
6. The victim of the murder was a corrections employee, probation officer, parole officer, community corrections worker, home detention officer, fireman, judge, or law enforcement officer, and either: the victim was acting in the course of duty; or the murder was motivated by an act the victim performed while acting in the course of duty.
7. The defendant has been convicted of another murder.
8. The defendant has committed another murder, at any time, regardless of whether the defendant has been convicted of that other murder.
9. The defendant was: under the custody of the department of correction, under the custody of a county sheriff, on probation after receiving a sentence for the commission of a felony, or on parole, at the time the murder was committed.
10. The defendant dismembered the victim.
11. The defendant: burned, mutilated, or tortured the victim, decapitated or attempted to decapitate the victim.
12. The victim of the murder was less than 12 years of age.
13. The victim was a victim of any of the following offenses for which the defendant was convicted: A battery offense, kidnapping, criminal confinement, or a sex crime.
14. The victim of the murder was listed by the state or known by the defendant to be a witness against the defendant and the defendant committed the murder with the intent to prevent the person from testifying.
15. The defendant committed the murder by intentionally discharging a firearm: into an inhabited dwelling, or from a vehicle.
16. The victim of the murder was pregnant and the murder resulted in the intentional killing of a fetus that has attained viability.
17. The defendant knowingly or intentionally committed the murder: in a building primarily used for an educational purpose, on school property, and when students are present; or committed the murder in a building or other structure owned or rented by a state educational institution or any other public or private postsecondary educational institution and primarily used for an educational purpose, and at a time when classes are in session.
18. The murder is committed: in a building that is primarily used for religious worship, and at a time when persons are present for religious worship or education.

== History ==
=== Post-Furman ===
In 1972, the U.S. Supreme Court in Furman v. Georgia held all state capital punishment sentencing statutes were unconstitutional. As a result, all seven men on Indiana's death row at the time had their sentences reduced to life in prison. The Indiana General Assembly enacted a new death penalty sentencing statute to replace the statute struck down by the U.S. Supreme Court in Furman in 1973. In 1977, the Indiana Supreme Court struck down Indiana's 1973 capital punishment statute based on the U.S. Supreme Court decision in Woodson v. North Carolina. The death sentences of the eight men on Indiana's death row were set aside. On October 1, 1977, a new Indiana capital punishment statute, modeled on statutes upheld by U.S. Supreme Court, took effect. It remains in effect today.

The state resumed executions on March 9, 1981, with the judicial electrocution of mass murderer Steven Judy for four murders. Gregory Resnover, who was one of the two men found guilty of the 1980 murder of Indianapolis Police Sergeant Jack Ohrberg, was executed by the electric chair on December 8, 1994, therefore becoming the third and last person executed by this method in Indiana, before lethal injection replaced electrocution as the only method of execution in Indiana in 1995. Resnover's accomplice, Tommie Smith, was the first to be executed by lethal injection on July 18, 1996.

== See also ==
- List of people executed in Indiana
- List of death row inmates in the United States § Indiana
- Crime in Indiana
- Law of Indiana
