= List of people executed by electrocution =

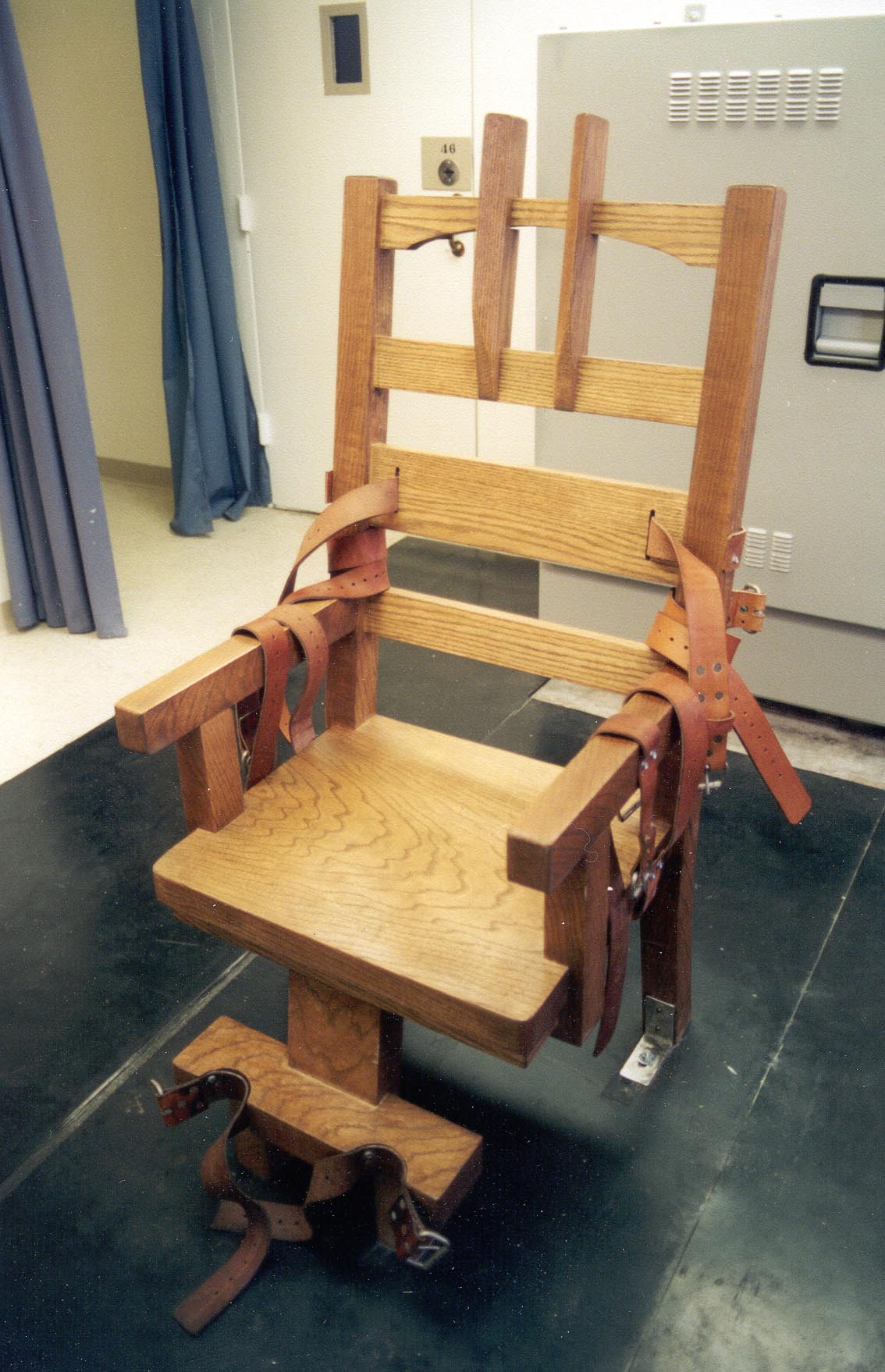
Electric chair at the Florida State Prison

This is the list of people executed by electrocution through the electric chair. The electric chair was mainly used in the United States from the 1890s until today, and the Philippines from 1926 to 1976.

== United States ==
=== Alabama ===
- Lynda Lyon Block, who was convicted of killing a police officer. Block was the last woman to be executed by electrocution.
- John Louis Evans and Wayne Eugene Ritter, both convicted of killing a pawn shop owner.
- Larry Gene Heath, who kidnapped and killed his pregnant wife.
- Edward Dean Horsley Jr., accomplice of executed killer Brian Keith Baldwin.
- Walter Hill, convicted serial killer.
- Henry Francis Hays, a member of Ku Klux Klan who was executed for the lynching of Michael Donald.
- Brian Keith Baldwin, who was executed for killing a woman but allegedly innocent. Accomplice of Edward Dean Horsley Jr. (also executed).
- Billy Wayne Waldrop, along with William Eugene Singleton and Henry Leslie Mays, shot, beat, and killed Thurman Macon Donahoo during a robbery. The three then set Donahoo's home on fire, leaving him for dead. His charred body was later found in the ruins of the house.
- Jeremiah Reeves, an African-American man who was controversially executed for the rape of a white woman in 1958.
- Rhonda Belle Martin, American serial killer.
- Horace DeVaughn, the first person executed in Alabama by the electric chair.
- James Cobern, the last person executed for robbery in both Alabama and the United States, and the last person executed for a crime other than murder in the United States.
- Wallace Norrell Thomas, who was one of the three men convicted of the 1976 murder of Quenette Shehane.

=== Arkansas ===
- Lester Brockelhurst, spree killer and serial killer who held up and murdered at least three men in multiple states.
- James Waybern Hall, American serial killer executed for his wife's murder.
- Arthur Hodges, convicted cop killer and the first white person to be executed by electrocution in Arkansas.
- John Edward Swindler, convicted of the murder of a police officer.

=== Connecticut ===
- Frank Wojculewicz, a paraplegic convicted murderer executed for murdering a police officer and bystander despite his disability.
- Joseph Louis Taborsky, one of the two culprits behind the Mad Dog killings, and the last person executed by the electric chair in the state of Connecticut.

=== District of Columbia (Washington, D.C.) ===
- Robert Eugene Carter, convicted cop killer and the last person executed in Washington, D.C. before the District's 1981 abolition of capital punishment.

=== Federal government of the United States ===
- Clyde Arwood, sentenced to death for the murder of federal agent William Pugh and executed at the Tennessee State Penitentiary on August 14, 1943.
- David Joseph Watson, sentenced to death for murdering a shipmate on the high seas and executed at the Florida State Prison on September 15, 1948.
- Julius and Ethel Rosenberg, sentenced to death for espionage and executed at the New York State Prison, Sing Sing on June 19, 1953.
- Gerhard Puff, sentenced to death for murder and executed at the New York State Prison, Sing Sing on August 12, 1954.
- George and Michael Krull, a pair of brothers sentenced to death for rape and executed at the Georgia State Prison on August 21, 1957.

=== Florida ===
- Ted Bundy, a serial killer who confessed to 30 murders, 20 of which have been confirmed. Bundy is one of the most notorious criminals in history.
- Judy Buenoano, convicted and sentenced to death for the murder of her husband, James Goodyear. She also received a life sentence for the murder of her son, Michael Buenoano. In 1978, she murdered her then-boyfriend, Bobby Joe Morris, in Colorado, but was never tried for his death due to her existing death sentence in Florida.
- Allen Lee Davis, a convicted murderer. His botched execution led Florida to switch from the electric chair to lethal injection.
- Willie Darden, executed for robbery and murder committed in 1973.
- Jeffrey Daugherty, convicted serial killer.
- Marvin Francois, executed for a series of murders in Carol City, Florida, alongside his accomplices Beauford James White and John Errol Ferguson.
- Beauford White, executed for the same series of murders in Carol City, Florida, with Marvin Francois and John Errol Ferguson.
- Robert Austin Sullivan, convicted murderer who, along with accomplice Reid McLaughlin, killed a newly hired assistant manager.
- John Spenkelink, the first person executed in Florida after capital punishment was reinstated in 1976.
- Jerry White, convicted of murdering a shopper during a grocery store robbery. His execution drew attention due to witnesses reporting an unusual physical reaction to the electric chair.
- Robert Dale Henderson, a convicted spree killer who murdered 12 people, including three victims in a single day.
- Giuseppe Zangara, convicted assassin who fatally shot Chicago mayor Anton Cermak.
- James Dupree Henry, convicted of killing civil rights leader Zellie Riley.
- David Funchess, a convicted triple murderer and the first Vietnam War veteran diagnosed with PTSD to be executed by a U.S. state.
- Arthur Frederick Goode III, a convicted child murderer.
- Franklin McCall, convicted and sentenced to death for the kidnapping and murder of James Bailey Cash Jr.
- Pedro Medina, convicted of murdering a 52-year-old woman in Orlando, Florida. His execution was also botched.
- Daniel Remeta, convicted spree killer.
- Gerald Stano, a convicted serial killer who murdered at least 23 young women and girls. He confessed to 41 murders, though police believe his actual victim count could be as high as 88.
- Michael Durocher, a serial killer who murdered five people between 1983 and 1988 in Florida, including his six-month-old son, his girlfriend and her daughter.
- Johnny Paul Witt, convicted of the 1973 kidnapping, rape and murder of Jonathan Kushner, the 11-year-old son of a professor from the University of South Florida.
- Aubrey Dennis Adams Jr., who was convicted of the 1978 murder of Trisa Thornley.
- John Earl Bush, one of the four kidnappers convicted of the 1982 abduction, robbery and murder of Frances Slater.
- Nollie Lee Martin, who was executed in 1992 for the murder of Patricia Greenfield. He was also convicted of the arson and murder of a woman and her two daughters in North Carolina.
- Ernest Dobbert, who was found guilty of torturing and murdering his daughter and son

=== Georgia ===
- John Eldon Smith, convicted double killer.
- Van Roosevelt Solomon, convicted alongside Brandon Astor Jones in a robbery-murder case.
- Warren McCleskey, convicted cop killer.
- William Henry Hance, convicted serial killer.
- Nicholas Ingram, who killed a retired military veteran.
- Ellis Wayne Felker, who killed a waitress but was allegedly innocent.
- Lena Baker, shot and killed Ernest Knight in what she alleges was self-defense. Baker was given a full and unconditional pardon sixty years after her execution in 2005.
- Christopher Burger and Thomas Dean Stevens, who were both convicted of the 1977 murder of Roger Honeycutt.
- Timothy McCorquodale, who was found guilty of the 1974 sexual assault and torture murder of Donna Marie Dixon.

=== Illinois ===
- George Dale, who was executed for the fatal shooting of a shopkeeper.
- James Morelli, convicted mass murderer.
- Robert Nixon, convicted serial killer.

=== Indiana ===
- Steven Judy, convicted mass murderer.
- Richard Kiefer, convicted of the murders of his daughter and wife.
- William Vandiver, who was convicted of murdering his father-in-law.
- Gregory Resnover, one of the two men found guilty of the 1980 murder of Jack Ohrberg.

=== Kentucky ===
- Will Lockett, executed for murder in 1920.
- Harold McQueen Jr., executed for robbery and murder in 1997.

=== Louisiana ===
- Robert Wayne Williams, convicted of the murder of a security guard.
- Elmo Patrick Sonnier, convicted of rape and murder.
- Robert Lee Willie, convicted serial killer.
- Jimmy L. Glass and Jimmy C. Wingo, both convicted of killing a couple.
- Leslie Lowenfield, who killed his girlfriend, a Sheriff's deputy and a family of four.
- Dalton Prejean, a juvenile offender found guilty of murdering a state trooper.
- Andrew Lee Jones, executed for the rape and murder of a young girl.
- Willie Francis, who shot and killed a pharmacist, and survived his first execution attempt in 1946. Eventually executed in 1947.
- David Dene Martin, who shot and killed his wife's lover and three other people in 1977.

=== Massachusetts ===
- Sacco and Vanzetti, a pair of Italian immigrants executed at the Charlestown State Prison for murder

=== Mississippi ===
- Willie McGee, an African-American man controversially executed for raping a white woman.
- Houston Roberts, who was executed in 1951 for the murder of his five-year-old granddaughter.
- Luther Carlyle Wheeler, who was executed for murdering a Hattiesburg police officer on February 5, 1954.

=== Nebraska ===
- Charles Starkweather, convicted spree killer who murdered eleven people alongside his girlfriend, Caril Ann Fugate.
- Harold Lamont Otey, convicted rapist-murderer.
- John Joubert, convicted serial killer.
- Robert E. Williams, convicted spree killer.

=== New York ===
- William Kemmler – convicted wife-killer and the first person to be executed by the electric chair in the United States.
- Albert Fish – convicted serial killer, child murderer and cannibal. Fish was a suspect in at least ten murders during his lifetime.
- Leon Czolgosz, who was found guilty of the 1901 assassination of William McKinley, the 25th president of the United States. He was executed at the Auburn Correctional Facility on October 29, 1901.
- Raymond Fernandez and Martha Beck, a couple and pair of serial killers executed on March 8, 1951, for one out of a suspected total of three to 20 murders.
- Eddie Lee Mays, the last person executed in New York.
- John M. Dunn and his accomplice, Andrew "Squint" Sheridan, were both executed for murder in 1949.
- Francis "Two Gun" Crowley - A spree criminal. Had a 2 hour shoot out with the New York City Police Department.
- Martha M. Place, the first woman executed by the electric chair in the United States.

=== North Carolina ===
- Asbury Respus, a serial killer executed in 1932 for eight murders.

=== Oklahoma ===
- Monroe Betterton, a serial killer executed in 1920.
- Richard Henry Dare, convicted mass murderer.
- James French, convicted murderer who was the last person executed by the electric chair in Oklahoma.

=== Pennsylvania ===
- Paul Jaworski, who was executed in 1929 for a case of armed robbery resulting in death.
- Herman and Paul Petrillo, a pair of cousins and members of the Philadelphia poison ring who were executed in 1941 for first-degree murder.
- Irene Schroeder, the first woman to be executed by electrocution in the Commonwealth of Pennsylvania.
- Elmo Lee Smith, who was executed in 1962 for the murder-rape of a 16-year-old girl. The last person executed by the electric chair in the Commonwealth of Pennsylvania.
- Alexander McClay Williams, an African-American teenager who was wrongfully executed in 1931 for the 1930 murder of Vida Robare. His conviction was posthumously overturned in 2022 and he was officially exonerated.

=== South Carolina ===
- Larry Gene Bell – convicted serial killer.
- Donald Henry Gaskins – convicted serial killer.
- James Earl Reed – convicted of killing the parents of his former girlfriend.
- James Terry Roach – convicted double killer and juvenile accomplice of Joseph Carl Shaw.
- Joseph Carl Shaw – convicted double killer and accomplice of James Terry Roach.
- James Neil Tucker – convicted of killing two women.
- Ronald Woomer – convicted spree killer who committed four murders in 1979.
- George Stinney – an African-American boy wrongfully executed for the murders of two white girls in March 1944.

=== South Dakota ===
- George Sitts – convicted serial killer who was executed for the 1946 murder of state Division of Criminal Investigation special agent Tom Matthews.

=== Tennessee ===
- Leroy Hall Jr. (Lee Hall) – convicted of the 1991 murder of Traci Crozier.
- Daryl Holton – convicted of killing his three sons and their half-sister.
- David Earl Miller – convicted of the 1981 murder of Lee Standifer.
- Julius Morgan – convicted of rape and executed in 1916, the first person executed in Tennessee's electric chair.
- Nicholas Todd Sutton – convicted serial killer.
- Stephen Michael West – convicted of the 1986 murders of Wanda and Sheila Romines.
- Edmund Zagorski – convicted of a 1983 double murder case.

=== Virginia ===
- Earl Bramblett – convicted mass murderer.
- Linwood and James Briley – a pair of brothers convicted of a murder, rape, and robbery spree in 1979.
- Michael David Clagett – one of the two perpetrators of the 1994 Virginia bar murders.
- Albert Jay Clozza – convicted of the 1983 rape and murder of Patricia Bolton.
- Roger Keith Coleman – convicted murderer.
- Frank J. Coppola – convicted murderer.
- Wilbert Lee Evans – convicted cop killer.
- Edward Fitzgerald Sr. – convicted of the 1980 mutilation and murder of Patricia Cubbage.
- Robert Charles Gleason Jr., the last person executed by electrocution in Virginia before the abolition of capital punishment.
- Brandon Hedrick – convicted rapist-killer.
- Buddy Justus – spree killer convicted of killing three women across Georgia, Florida, and Virginia.
- Morris Mason – convicted murderer.
- Paul Warner Powell – convicted murderer.
- Syvasky Poyner – convicted spree killer.
- Timothy Wilson Spencer – convicted serial killer.
- Charles Stamper, convicted triple murderer.

=== Vermont ===
- Donald Edward DeMag, the last person executed in Vermont before abolition of capital punishment.
- Francis Blair, accomplice of Donald Edward DeMag, executed on February 8, 1954.

=== West Virginia ===
- Elmer Bruner, the last person executed in West Virginia before the abolition of capital punishment.

=== United States military ===
- George John Dasch, Edward John Kerling, Richard Quirin, Heinrich Harm Heinck, Hermann Otto Neubauer and Werner Thiel, six of the eight defendants found guilty of sabotage and spying activities conducted under Operation Pastorius. The six were sentenced to death by a specially-appointed military commission and executed on August 8, 1942. The remaining two defendants had their death sentences commuted to life and 30 years respectively.

== The Philippines ==
- Julio Guillen, who was executed in 1950 for the attempted assassination of Filipino president Manuel Roxas that resulted in the deaths of two bystanders.
- Marcial "Baby Ama" Perez, who was executed on October 4, 1961 at the age of 16 for murder.
- Jaime Jose, Basilio Pineda, and Edgardo Aquino, three of the convicted rapists of the Maggie de la Riva rape case, executed on May 17, 1972.
- Marcelo San Jose, the last person executed by the electric chair in the Philippines, executed on October 21, 1976.

== See also ==
- Electric chair
- Capital punishment in the United States
- Capital punishment in the Philippines
- List of people executed by lethal injection
