= Frank J. Coppola =

American murderer (1944–1982)

- Born: Frank Joseph Coppola; February 25, 1944; Portsmouth, Virginia, U.S.
- Died: August 10, 1982 (aged 38); Virginia State Penitentiary, Richmond, Virginia, U.S.
- Cause of death: Execution by electrocution
- Other name: Frank James Coppola
- Occupation: Police officer
- Convictions: Capital murder Maiming; Robbery (2 counts); Use of a firearm in the commission of a felony
- Penalty: Death (September 26, 1978)

Details
- Victims: Muriel Hatchell, 51
- Date: April 22, 1978

Frank Joseph Coppola (February 25, 1944 – August 10, 1982) was an American convicted murderer and former police officer from Portsmouth, Virginia who was executed for the 1978 murder of 51-year-old Muriel Hatchell. Hatchell was bound with Venetian blind cords and then had her head slammed repeatedly into the floor until she died. Coppola and his accomplices fled with $3,100 in cash and some rings from the crime scene. On September 26, 1978, Coppola was convicted of capital murder and sentenced to death in Virginia's electric chair. His conviction and death sentence were upheld after an appeal to the Supreme Court of Virginia.

Coppola waived his subsequent appeals and was executed via electrocution on August 10, 1982, the first person executed in Virginia since the U.S. Supreme Court reinstituted capital punishment in 1976. He was also the first person executed in Virginia since 1962. He maintained his innocence until his execution. The resulting execution was botched as his head and leg caught fire during the execution. This provoked activists to protest calling the method of execution inhumane. Coppola became somewhat of a martyr to the prisoners. An attorney who was present later stated that it took two 55-second jolts of electricity to kill Coppola.

== Early life ==
Frank Joseph Coppola was born on February 25, 1944, in Portsmouth, Virginia, the youngest of three children born to Vincent Anthony Coppola and Mary Rose Coppola. He grew up in a lower-middle-class neighborhood in Portsmouth, where he was supported by his family, who were very religious. As a child, he served as an altar boy at St. Paul's Catholic Church in Portsmouth. Frank was close to his father, who worked as a bookkeeper, with the two sharing a mutual love for athletics. In 1954, Frank's older sister died due to kidney failure. In 1957, his father died as well. In 1963, Frank graduated from St. Paul's Catholic High School.

== Career ==
In August 1965, Coppola joined the Portsmouth Police Department. Within his first twelve months of service, he was dismissed, due to submitting a false statement to the chief of police and for failing to report an assault on a prisoner. Coppola appealed his dismissal and was reinstated into the force after a ninety-day suspension without pay. In April 1967, Coppola was suspended again, this time for insubordination to a superior police officer. Two months later, he was recommended for dismissal for failing to perform duties correctly on three occasions. Within days, Coppola submitted his resignation and ended his career in law enforcement.

Over the next few years, Coppola worked multiple jobs and was a finance worker, a co-owner of a drive-in restaurant, a car salesman, and a carpenter's assistant. Between 1968 and 1970, Coppola worked as a salesman for Gosport Motor Sales, where he was promoted to assistant sales manager. During these years, he married his first wife, with whom he had two sons. The marriage ended in 1971, while Coppola was serving time for a burglary conviction. In July 1973, Coppola was released from prison and returned to selling cars. In 1974, he opened his own business, running an automobile reconditioning firm. During this time, Coppola remarried to a woman named Karen Lewis Evans. In March 1975, Coppola was involved in an automobile accident that left him with back pain. The accident, amongst other issues, caused his second marriage to fall apart. The couple struggled financially and from January 1976, they lived off of money that they borrowed from family and friends.

== Murder ==
Coppola and his former accomplice in the burglary conviction, Joseph Miltier, along with Miltier's girlfriend, Donna Mills, and Coppola's wife, Karen Coppola (née Evans), plotted to rob Payton M. Hatchell, a wealthy used car dealer who lived in a quiet neighborhood in Newport News, Virginia. In the spring of 1978, Coppola, posing as a priest, tried to gain entry to Hatchell's home, but was unsuccessful. Weeks later, the group came up with another plan. On April 22, 1978, Mills knocked on Hatchell's door posing as a delivery girl. Hatchell's wife, Muriel Hatchell, answered the door. Unbeknownst to her, Mills was armed with a gun that was hidden in some roses. Mills, Coppola, and Miltier then gained access to the house, while Karen waited as the getaway driver in a nearby vehicle. Once inside, Muriel was beaten by the trio. According to trial testimony, Coppola repeatedly smashed Muriel's head against the floor, demanding to know where she kept all her money.

During the home invasion, Payton Hatchell returned home and witnessed the attack on his wife. The group then also attacked him, before fleeing the property with three rings and $3,000 in cash. Muriel died of a brain hemorrhage and complications with aspiration due to vomit in her throat. Payton survived the beating and remained in the hospital for three weeks, requiring a permanent steel plate in his forehead from where blows inflicted by Coppola had fractured his skull.

== Trial ==
All four perpetrators were captured and found guilty of the crime. In September 1978, Coppola was tried and convicted of capital murder. He denied any involvement in the crime. Circumstantial and direct evidence was used against him. His fingerprints were found on Hatchell's car and Mills testified against him, describing to the jury how Coppola beat and murdered Muriel. On September 26, 1978, following the guilty verdict, Coppola was sentenced to death.

For their roles in the crime; Miltier was sentenced to three life terms, Mills received life plus one-hundred and seventeen years, and Karen Coppola was sentenced to fifty-five years as an accessory.

== Execution ==
In the summer of 1982, Coppola chose to drop all his appeals. He chose to do so because he did not want to spend the rest of his life in prison and wished to spare his family any possible further agony. Coppola said he was prepared to pull the switch himself when the time came for his execution.

On August 10, 1982, Coppola was executed in the electric chair at the Virginia State Penitentiary. He was pronounced dead at 11:27 p.m. At the time of his execution, members of the jury that had convicted him were asked if they stood by the decision to sentence him to death. Ten of the jurors responded, all standing by the decision, and justifying their verdict.

After the execution, one of Coppola's attorneys claimed that the execution had been botched, alleging that the first jolt of electricity administered did not kill him, while the second jolt produced "the odor and sizzling sound of burning flesh," and the death chamber filled with smoke as fire was emitted from the electrodes on his head and leg. There were no media witnesses at Coppola's execution.

Coppola was the first person to be executed in Virginia in over twenty years, since March 2, 1962. Since the reinstatement of capital punishment in 1976, Coppola was the first person to be executed in Virginia, and the fifth in the United States, after Gary Gilmore, John Spenkelink, Jesse Bishop, and Steven Judy.

== See also ==
- Capital punishment in Virginia
- Capital punishment in the United States
- List of people executed in Virginia
- List of people executed in the United States, 1976–1983
- List of botched executions
- Volunteer (capital punishment)
- List of people executed by electrocution

Executions carried out in Virginia
Preceded by Carroll Garland March 2, 1962	Frank J. Coppola; August 10, 1982	Succeeded by Linwood Earl Briley October 12, 1984
Executions carried out in the United States
Preceded by Steven Judy – Indiana March 9, 1981	Frank J. Coppola – Virginia; August 10, 1982	Succeeded by Charles Brooks Jr. – Texas December 7, 1982
