= Frank Coppola =

Frank Coppola may refer to:

- Frank J. Coppola (1944–1982), American police officer who was executed for murder
- Francis Ford Coppola (born 1939), American film director
- Frank Coppola (mobster) (1899–1982), Italian-American mobster and crime boss
