= List of people executed in Oklahoma (pre-1972) =

The following is a list of people executed by the U.S. state of Oklahoma before 1972, when capital punishment was briefly abolished by the Supreme Court's ruling in Furman v. Georgia. For people executed by Oklahoma after the restoration of capital punishment by the Supreme Court's ruling in Gregg v. Georgia (1976), see List of people executed in Oklahoma.

== Background ==
When Oklahoma became a state in 1907, all executions were carried out by hanging within the county of conviction. Very few hangings occurred during this time period due to governor Lee Cruce's opposition to capital punishment. In 1915, Oklahoma adopted electrocution as its main form of capital punishment, with a designated execution chamber being added to the state penitentiary in McAlester. From that year to 1972, 83 prisoners (all male) were executed in the state penitentiary. 82 were electrocuted; one of the prisoners, sentenced to death by the federal government under the "Lindbergh law", was hanged instead as was required for federal executions at the time. (Hanging was retained by the state as an alternative method.)

== List of executions ==
Name	Race	Age	Date of execution	County	Crime	Victim(s)	Governor
Frank Ford	Black	26	June 12, 1908	Tillman	Murder	Anna Rogers, black (wife)	Charles N. Haskell
John Hopkins	White	38	August 28, 1908	Ottawa	Murder	Lena Craig, 18, white	Charles N. Haskell
Will Johnson	Black	19	December 11, 1908	Pottawatomie	Murder-Robbery	Mary Cuppy, 75, white	Charles N. Haskell
Henry Armstrong	White (Note: "One-sixteenth (Native American), the balance white".)		November 19, 1909	Noble	Murder	Isaac Fell, white	Charles N. Haskell
Alfred King	Black		February 4, 1910	Nowata	Murder-Robbery	George Bird, black	Charles N. Haskell
Alf Hunter	Black		April 8, 1910	Blaine	Murder	George Washington Garrison, 50, white (Oklahoma County sheriff) (Note: Serial killer, previously committed a murder in Arkansas and then murdered a black woman named Susie Pride in Oklahoma City out of fear she would reveal his location.)	Charles N. Haskell
John Black	Black		April 15, 1910	Hughes	Murder-Robbery	J. P. Stephens, white	Charles N. Haskell
Frank Henson	Black		March 31, 1911	Tulsa	Murder	Charles W. Stamper, white (deputy sheriff)	Lee Cruce
Henry Bookman	Black	28	December 10, 1915	McIntosh	Murder	Richard Hardin, white	Robert L. Williams
Cecil Towery	Black	22	November 6, 1916	McIntosh	Murder-Robbery	Charles Vaughn, white	Robert L. Williams
Chester Taylor	Black	44	April 13, 1917	Creek	Murder	Millie Taylor, black (wife)	Robert L. Williams
Charley Young	Black	26	April 13, 1917	Tillman	Murder	Male, white	Robert L. Williams
Willie Williams	Black	35	April 13, 1917	Muskogee	Murder	Samuel Henry Neal, 39, white (policeman)	Robert L. Williams
John Prather	Black	26	May 3, 1918	Pittsburg	Murder	Charles Chapman, black (cellmate)	Robert L. Williams
James Brown	Black	34	November 8, 1918	Muskogee	Murder	Glenn Jacobs, white	Robert L. Williams
T. R. Braught	White	29	May 23, 1919	Creek	Murder	Otis Robbin, white	Jack C. Walton
Monroe Betterton	White	48	July 9, 1920	Craig	Murder	Elzadah Betterton, white (wife)	Jack C. Walton
John Ledbetter	Native American	31	February 25, 1921	Muskogee	Murder	Robert Moreland, race unknown	Jack C. Walton
Robert Blakely	White	39	February 25, 1921	Muskogee	Murder	Effie May Allford, white	Jack C. Walton
Eli Thomas	Black	22	July 15, 1921	LeFlore	Murder	Selma Mayfield, white	Jack C. Walton
Steve Sabo	White	50	March 17, 1922	Coal	Murder-Rape	Sophia Sabo, 19, white (niece)	Jack C. Walton
Sam Watkins	White	39	May 5, 1922	Atoka	Murder-Rape	Cora Jones, white	Jack C. Walton
Aaron Harvey	White	21	January 13, 1924	McCurtain	Murder	Five people, white (Note: Jack Pope's wife, her two children, and her parents.)	Martin E. Trapp
Jack Pope	White	45	January 13, 1924	McCurtain	Murder	Five people, white	Martin E. Trapp
Richard Birkes	White	29	September 5, 1924	Craig	Murder-Robbery	Frank Pitts, white	Martin E. Trapp
Leroy Scott	Black	22	May 29, 1925	Pittsburg	Murder	Frank Daniels, white	Martin E. Trapp
Johnnie Washington	Black	29	December 4, 1925	Jackson	Murder	Male, white (peace officer)	Martin E. Trapp
Theodore Bruster	Black	21	June 29, 1928	Muskogee	Murder-Robbery	William Heeman, white	Henry S. Johnston
Walter Wigger	White	31	June 29, 1928	Ottawa	Murder	Ruth Harris, white (girlfriend)	Henry S. Johnston
Willie O'Neil	Black	27	June 29, 1928	Oklahoma	Murder-Robbery	Mark Hipscher, white	Henry S. Johnston
James Forrest	Black	23	July 17, 1930	Stephens	Rape	Female, white	William J. Holloway
Tom Guest	White	48	July 17, 1930	Pottawatomie	Murder-Robbery	Bailey Browder, white	William J. Holloway
E. S. Hembree	Native American	32	April 17, 1931	Stephens	Rape	Leota Bosley, 23, white	William H. Murray
Paul Cole	White	33	July 10, 1931	Seminole	Murder	Ernest Irby, white	William H. Murray
Bennie Nichols	Black	31	August 21, 1931	Pontotoc	Murder-Robbery	Jack Hornton, white	William H. Murray
Henry Lovett	White	39	September 25, 1931	Canadian	Murder-Robbery	Dee Foliart, 28, white	William H. Murray
Martin Keeney	White	49	March 11, 1932	Oklahoma	Murder	W. H. Folwell, 73, white	William H. Murray
A. M. Harris	White	49	June 17, 1932	Oklahoma	Murder	Ed Martin, 62, white	William H. Murray
Ira J. Adler	White	50	August 19, 1932	Blaine	Murder	Tom and Nora McDonald, white (brother- and sister-in-law)	William H. Murray
Charles Davis	Black	42	August 19, 1932	Blaine	Murder	Guy M. Jarvis, 38, white (undersheriff)	William H. Murray
Ivory Covington	Black	25	January 27, 1933	Choctaw	Murder-Robbery	Luther Williams, white	William H. Murray
Nathan Rightsell	White	27	February 24, 1933	Choctaw	Murder	Jason Victor Buchanan, white (officer)	William H. Murray
Charles Lattimer	White	29	March 24, 1933	Comanche	Murder	Female, white (wife)	William H. Murray
Proctor McDonald	White	24	May 5, 1933	Creek	Murder-Robbery	Raymond Butler, 8, white	William H. Murray
Joe Martin	White	54	May 5, 1933	Noble	Murder	Pete Von Uearop, white	William H. Murray
Albert Ellis	White	25	May 5, 1933	Carter	Robbery (Note: Also kidnapped and raped one of the victims, 19-year-old Jo Anna Weber.)	John Weber and his family, white	William H. Murray
Luke Nichols	White	44	May 19, 1933	Alfalfa	Murder	Harriet Crawford, 26, white (girlfriend)	William H. Murray
Claude Oliver	White	28	August 23, 1933	Murray	Murder	Della Oliver, 15, white (George's wife)	William H. Murray
George Oliver	White	18	August 23, 1933	Murray	Murder	Della Oliver, 15, white (George's wife)	William H. Murray
Ted Patton	White	25	October 20, 1933	Sequoyah	Murder	Robert Wall, 19, white	William H. Murray
Charley Dumas	Black	29	October 20, 1933	Coal	Rape	Female, white	William H. Murray
William Johnson	Black	28	November 10, 1933	Muskogee	Murder	Mary Wolfenberger, white	William H. Murray
Tom Morris	Black	40	November 24, 1933	Pittsburg	Murder	Mr. and Mrs. Joe House, white	William H. Murray
Earl Quinn	White	29	November 24, 1933	Garfield	Murder-Rape	Jessie Griffith, 24, white (Note: Also murdered Jessie's sister, Zenia.)	William H. Murray
Frank Clark	Black	60	October 19, 1934	McCurtain	Murder	Dan and Anna Stiles, white	William H. Murray
Ernest Oglesby	White	27	January 4, 1935	Oklahoma	Murder	Douglas Gates, white (Oklahoma City policeman)	William H. Murray
Robert Cargo	White	21	May 24, 1935	Oklahoma	Murder-Robbery	A. L. Luke, white	E. W. Marland
Alfred Rowan	Black	30	September 20, 1935	Jackson	Murder	Roy Gentry, white	E. W. Marland
Bun Riley	White	29	September 20, 1935	Pittsburg	Murder	Three persons, white (Note: Homer Beasley, Hobart Watkins, and William Gann.)	E. W. Marland
Chester Barrett	White	37	September 20, 1935	Creek	Murder	Three of his children, white (Note: 6-year-old Betty Jo, 3-year-old Mary Kathryn, and 2-year-old Wanda Marie.)	E. W. Marland
Roy Guyton	Black	25	March 20, 1936	Oklahoma	Murder	E. L. Bailey, white	E. W. Marland
James Hargus	White	26	April 24, 1936	Tulsa	Murder	L. D. Mitchell, white (Tulsa policeman)	E. W. Marland
Arthur Gooch	White	27	June 19, 1936 (Note: Only hanging at the Oklahoma State Penitentiary.)	N/A (Federal)	Kidnapping (Note: One of the victims was badly injured.)	R. N. Baker and H. R. Marks, white (policemen)	E. W. Marland
Leon Siler	White	22	June 11, 1937	Comanche	Murder	J. E. Wilson, white (Grady County deputy sheriff)	E. W. Marland
Charlie Sands	Native American	21	June 11, 1937	Comanche	Murder	J. E. Wilson, white (Grady County deputy sheriff)	E. W. Marland
Roy Mannon	White	38	March 1, 1940	Wagoner	Murder-Robbery	Jake Skelly, 67, white	Leon C. Phillips
Roger Cunningham	White	30	November 15, 1940	Oklahoma	Murder	Eudora Cunningham, white (wife)	Leon C. Phillips
Warren Abby	White	59	August 29, 1941	Custer	Murder	Julia Abby, 78, white (wife)	Leon C. Phillips
J. D. Tuggle	White	23	February 9, 1942	Garvin	Murder-Robbery	Mr. and Mrs. D. Wilburn Jones, white (uncle and aunt)	Leon C. Phillips
Finley Porter	Black	40	April 16, 1943	Pittsburg	Murder	L. Z. Beacham, black (cellmate) (Note: Murder committed in 1941 while serving a life sentence for the 1925 murder of his wife.)	Robert S. Kerr
Hiram Prather	White	35	July 14, 1943	Pittsburg	Murder	Jess Dunn, white (warden) (Note: Serial killer, had committed two other murders. Murdered Dunn during an escape attempt.)	Robert S. Kerr
Amos Johnson	Black	30	March 23, 1945	Lincoln	Murder	Victoria and Martha Gorski, 38 and 3, white	Robert S. Kerr
Clifford Norman	Black	30	November 9, 1945	Murray	Rape	Female, white	Robert S. Kerr
Alfred Bingham	White	40	May 31, 1946	Tulsa	Murder	Mary Bingham, 30, white (wife)	Robert S. Kerr
Mose Johnson	Black	33	November 1, 1946	Pittsburg	Murder	L. C. Smalley, race unknown	Robert S. Kerr
Harlan Broyles	White	32	January 30, 1947	Seminole	Murder	Eric Nicholson, 35, white (deputy sheriff)	Roy J. Turner
Lewis Grayson	Black	31	May 25, 1948	Muskogee	Rape	Female, white	Roy J. Turner
Ben Gould	Black	40	September 27, 1948	Atoka	Murder-Rape-Robbery	Mary Lynn, 57, white	Roy J. Turner
Max Kletke	White	25	January 6, 1951	Oklahoma	Murder	Carl E. Beach, 45, white	Roy J. Turner
Jearell Hathcox	White	38	July 27, 1951	Oklahoma	Murder	Martin Lyle Shaffer, 67, white	Johnston Murray
Melburn Mott	White	35	September 21, 1951	Tulsa	Murder	Mary Frances Mott, 6, white (daughter)	Johnston Murray
Carl DeWolf	White	37	November 17, 1953	Tulsa	Murder	Jerry St. Clair, 25, white (Tulsa policeman)	Johnston Murray
Hurbie Fairris	White	22	January 18, 1956	Oklahoma	Murder	Bennie F. Cravatt, white (detective)	Raymond D. Gary
Otto Loel	White	44	January 11, 1957	Oklahoma	Murder	Elizabeth Jeanne Henderson, 31, white	Raymond D. Gary
Robert Hendricks	White	66	February 5, 1957	Craig	Murder-Robbery	Rheam Payton, 54, white	Raymond D. Gary
Edward Williams	White	30	July 28, 1960	Tulsa	Kidnapping (Note: Also murdered the victim, but was tried on the murder charge separately beforehand and received a life sentence.)	Tommy Cooke, 24, white	J. Howard Edmondson
James Spence	White	32	August 31, 1960	Cotton	Murder	Ruth Zimmerman, 19, white	J. Howard Edmondson
Ray Young	White	34	December 15, 1960	Jackson	Murder	John Barter, white (highway patrolman)	J. Howard Edmondson
Shelby Doggett	White	29	October 1, 1962	Comanche	Murder-Robbery	Jimmy Lee Lanman, 24, white	J. Howard Edmondson
Richard Dare	White	30	June 1, 1963	Oklahoma	Murder	Ted Albert, 60, white (Note: Also murdered his 24-year-old wife Patricia Ann, her 17-year-old nephew William McCormick, and Ted Albert's wife.)	Henry Bellmon
James French	White	30	August 10, 1966	Pittsburg	Murder	Eddie Shelton, white (cellmate)	Henry Bellmon

== See also ==
- Capital punishment in Oklahoma
- Crime in Oklahoma
