= Monroe Betterton =

American serial killer (1872–1920)

- Born: Lee Monroe Betterton; March 24, 1872; Kings Prairie Township, Missouri, U.S.
- Died: July 9, 1920 (aged 48); Oklahoma State Penitentiary, Oklahoma, U.S.
- Status: Executed by electrocution
- Conviction: Murder x2
- Penalty: Death (Oklahoma); 99 years imprisonment (Missouri)

Details
- Victims: 3 (two convictions)
- Span of crimes: 1904–1919
- Country: United States
- States: Missouri, Oklahoma
- Date apprehended: July 9, 1919

Lee Monroe Betterton (March 24, 1872 – July 9, 1920) was an American serial killer. Originally sentenced to 99 years imprisonment for killing his second wife in Missouri and suspected of having killed the first, Betterton was later paroled, remarried a third time and moved to Oklahoma, where he killed his last wife as well. He was sentenced to death for this final murder, and subsequently executed in 1920.

== Life in Missouri ==
Lee Monroe Betterton was born on March 24, 1872, in Kings Prairie Township, Missouri, one of fifteen children born to farmers Lee Land and Mary Catherine Betterton (née Whittingdon). Little is known about his childhood, but when he became an adult, he married a woman named Laura Elizabeth McCoy, with whom he had several children. The couple lived a seemingly normal life on a farm in Kings Prairie Township, with Betterton's only criminal convictions being for non-payment of fines.

In 1904, however, their marital life became strained, with the pair arguing frequently. During one such argument, an enraged Betterton beat Laura into unconsciousness, prompting neighbors to swoop in and rush her to a nearby hospital, where she soon died from her injuries. For reasons unknown, Betterton was never charged in her death, and shortly after, he hired a Choctaw woman named Rose Hudson to work as a housekeeper. The pair developed a liking for one another, and soon entered a de facto common law marriage. However, this relationship proved to be strained as well, as Hudson left Betterton on several occasions, but always returned to him. On December 28, 1906, after another argument between the two, Hudson left again, but felt compelled to accompany Betterton to Verona, where he had sent his children to live with their grandfather. After staying with them for some time, the pair decided to return home and boarded a train. On the way, Betterton drank a few pints of whiskey, and when they disembarked at Pierce City, they decided to walk on foot to nearby Monett. On the way however, Betterton and Hudson got into another argument, and in his inebriated state, Betterton pulled out a knife and stabbed her three times, causing Hudson to collapse on the ground. While she lay dying, he poured whiskey on her face until he was apprehended by the crew of a nearby passenger train. The men dragged Betterton to the city jail, where he readily confessed to killing Hudson, but claimed to have been drunk at the time. At his subsequent trial at Mount Vernon, Betterton pleaded guilty to the murder and was sentenced to 99 years imprisonment.

== Release, move to Oklahoma and final murder ==
In spite of his long prison sentence, Betterton was among several convicted murderers who were paroled on September 25, 1917. After his release, he returned to Monett, where he met a local woman named Elzadah Lockwood. The pair married at Mount Vernon on June 11, 1918, and settled at their home in the southern part of Monett. To the outside world, the couple lived a seemingly happy life, with the only trouble they had experienced being their house burning down because of an accidental fire on March 26, 1919.

However, this proved not to be the case, as the couple divorced just several months later. On July 1, they remarried again in Mount Vernon, coincidentally on the same day as Lockwood's daughter Mayme and one of Betterton's sons, Ernest. To celebrate the happy occasions, the two couples decided to visit some relatives in Vinita, Oklahoma, where the elder couple left the young newlyweds for a few days. On July 9, they returned to Vinita again for another visit. While the other family members were out of the house, Betterton and his wife got into another argument, prompting him to pull out his revolver and shoot her three times. After Elzadah fell to the ground, Betterton attempted to aim it at his daughter-in-law, but was prevented from doing so by Ernest, who rushed in the house and wrestled the revolver out of his father's hands. When alarmed neighbors came by to check what had happened, Betterton tried to pin the murder on his son, but was unable to convince anybody and was quickly dragged to the city jail. While awaiting trial on murder charges, Betterton threatened to kill both himself and the rest of his family if he was ever let out.

== Trial, imprisonment and execution ==
Betterton's preliminary trial was scheduled for July 29, 1919, with Emery Smith acting as a prosecutor in the case. After an almost three-month long trial, Betterton was found guilty of the murder and sentenced to death, with his initial execution date set for January 23, 1920. In pronouncing the death sentence, the presiding justice expressed his disappointment at the convict's actions, reinforced by the fact that his own children testified against him.

Despite the overwhelming evidence against him, Betterton continued to profess his innocence during his incarceration on death row. He was granted a stay of execution for a mental evaluation, which concluded that he was indeed sane and aware of his actions. His new execution date was set for July 9, 1920, which was coincidentally exactly a year to the exact date of his third wife's murder. On the day of his execution, Betterton released a statement to the press in which he again proclaimed his innocence, but also proclaimed that he was ready to be reunited with God. At noon on the day, he was executed in the electric chair at the Oklahoma State Penitentiary in McAlester. His final words were "Goodbye, and God bless you all."

== See also ==
- Capital punishment in Oklahoma
- List of people executed in Oklahoma (pre-1972)
- List of people executed in the United States in 1920
- List of serial killers in the United States

== Bibliography ==
- R. Michael Wilson (June 12, 2012). Legal Executions in Nebraska, Kansas and Oklahoma Including the Indian Territory: A Comprehensive Registry. McFarland. pp. 154–155. ISBN 978-0786489091.
