= George Dale (criminal) =

Executed American murderer

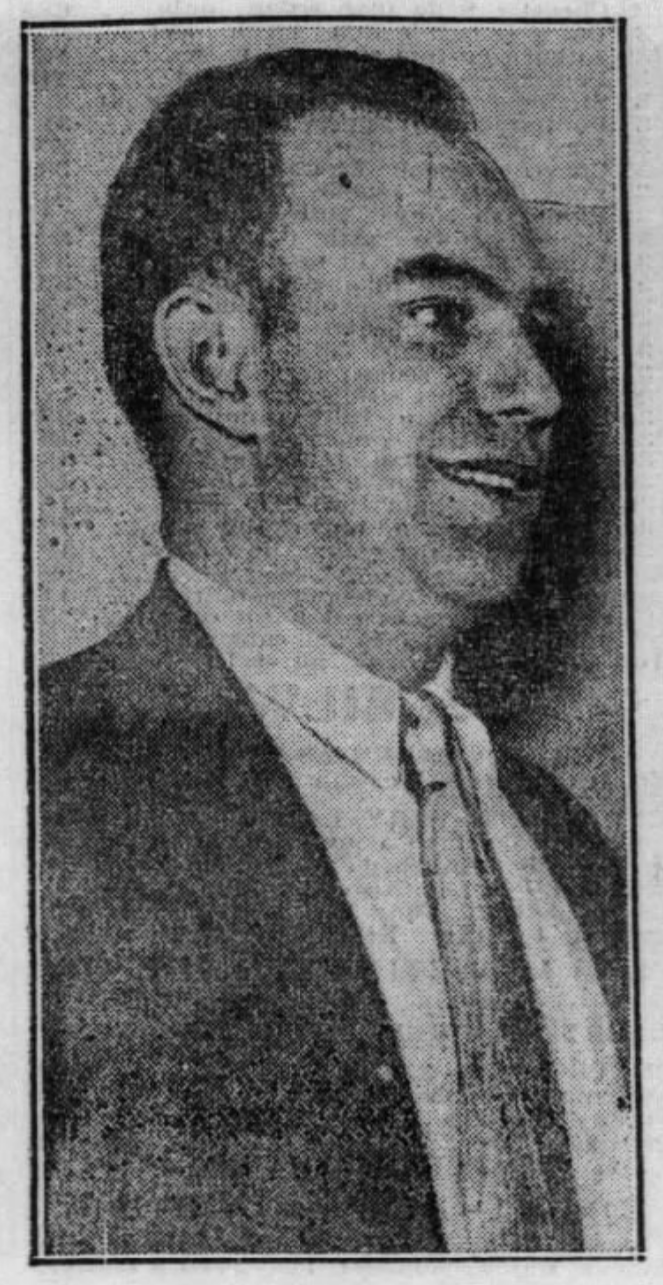
- Born: 1906; St. Louis, Missouri, United States
- Died: April 20, 1934 (aged 27–28); Cook County Jail, Chicago, Illinois, United States
- Cause of death: Execution by electrocution
- Other name: George Kennedy
- Known for: Criminal associate and lover of Eleanor Jarman
- Status: Executed
- Conviction: Murder
- Penalty: Death

George Dale (1906 – April 20, 1934) was the lover and criminal partner of Eleanor Jarman, dubbed by the press "The Blonde Tigress". Dale was executed by the state of Illinois in 1934 for the murder of Chicago clothier Gustav Hoeh, which he committed with Jarman and another criminal associate, Leo Minnici, acting as his accomplices.

Dale was the triggerman in the robbery of Hoeh's store and was, therefore, the only one of the gang to get the death penalty. Both Minnici and Jarman were sentenced to 199 years in prison for the August 1933 murder. Minnici was paroled in 1957. Jarman escaped from prison in 1940 and was never caught.

One of Dale's last acts before his electrocution was to write a love letter to Jarman.

== Early life ==
George Dale was born in 1906 in St. Louis, Missouri, to John Dale and Harriet Noll. Before the murder of Hoev and Dale's execution, he was a radio worker, an occupation that was ultimately listed on his death certificate.

== Murder of Gustav Hoeh ==
On August 4, 1933, Dale and Jarman broke into a haberdashery in Chicago, belonging to 71-year-old Gustav Hoeh. Jarman and Hoeh engaged in a physical fight, during which Jarman struck Hoeh in the head. Dale then shot Hoeh multiple times. Jarman and Hoeh fled in a getaway car driven by a third criminal associate named Leo Minneci, leaving Hoeh dead in front of his shop.

Jarman and Dale were arrested on August 9. After their arrest, police announced suspicions that the two were involved in up to 48 other holdups around the Chicago area. Dale and Jarman's modus operandi was for Jarman to use a blackjack or other physical means of threatening money out of robbery victims and punishing victims who refused to cooperate while Dale threatened the victims with a gun.

== Trial ==
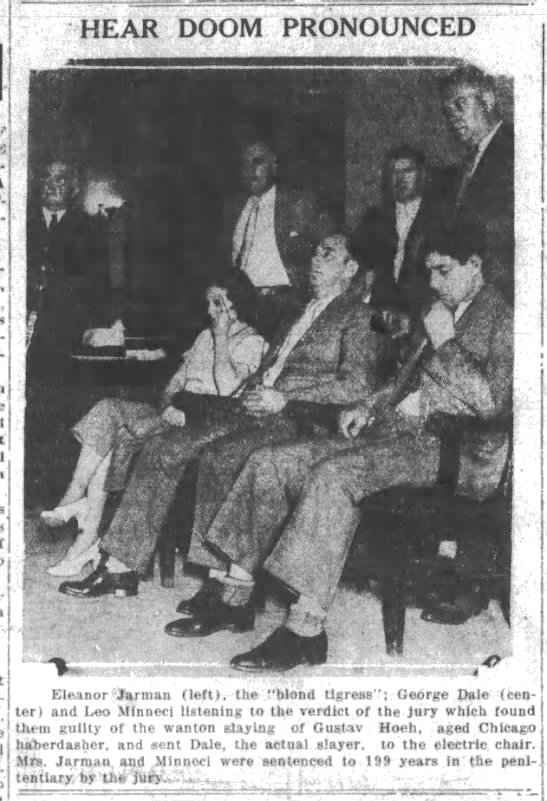
(From left to right) Eleanor Jarman, George Dale, and Leo Minneci hearing their sentences for the murder of Gustav Hoeh, 1933

Dale, Jarman, and Minneci were indicted on charges of murder on August 16, 1933. At the same time, they were also indicted for six separate robberies.

Dale, Jarman, and Minneci went on trial only three weeks after they were arrested. While all three were convicted of murder, Dale was considered the primary triggerman, so he received a heavier sentence than Jarman and Minneci, who were sentenced to serve 199 years in prison. Dale was sentenced to death and sent to the Cook County Jail to await execution while Jarman was sent to the Dwight Correctional Center.

Before hearing his death sentence, Dale attempted to absolve Jarman of the murder of Hoeh, telling the judge that another woman, Mary Davis, was his accomplice. He claimed that Jarman was waiting in the car outside and did not participate in beating Hoeh. Dale claimed that Davis had the same physical attributes as Jarman, leading to Jarman being falsely accused. The judge asked Dale to reveal Mary Davis's whereabouts, but Dale refused. The judge then formally sentenced Dale to death.

== Execution ==
Dale was originally scheduled to be executed on October 13, 1933, alongside Morris Cohen and John Scheck, who were sentenced to death for unrelated crimes. (Cohen had been convicted of the murder of police officer Joseph Hastings while Scheck had been convicted of the murder of police officer John G. Sevick.) Both Dale and Scheck won delays while Cohen did not; Cohen was executed on October 13 while Dale's execution was postponed for at least one month to give the Supreme Court of Illinois time to review his sentence.

Dale was ultimately scheduled to be executed on April 20, 1934, the same night as Scheck and a third condemned man named Joseph Francis. (Francis had been convicted of the murder of Joseph Hartell, a milkman, during a holdup.) Dale and Scheck spent most of their last moments visiting with family members and completing jigsaw puzzles; Dale also spent time praying with a Lutheran pastor and joking with reporters, quipping at one point, "You know, kid, I'm not sure I'm in favor of capital punishment." Dale received a last-minute visit from his sister Margaret. He requested that she not tell the rest of their family that he had been executed. In his last moments, he also wrote a sentimental farewell letter to Eleanor Jarman and ate a last meal of tenderloin steak, fried chicken, French fries, lettuce, corn, peaches, toast, and coffee.

Dale was the second of the three men executed, following Scheck and preceding Francis. There were an estimated 150-175 witnesses to the three executions. Several of the witnesses were relatives of Dale and Scheck's murder victims, including two of Gustav Hoeh's sons, Earl and Norman Hoeh. Dale's execution, from the application of the current until the pronouncement of death, took approximately six minutes; he was pronounced dead at 5:18 am. The executions of Scheck, Dale, and Francis marked the first time the Cook County Jail had carried out a triple execution in the electric chair, as well as the first time the Cook County Jail scheduled executions to take place at dawn rather than shortly after midnight. Authorities scheduled the executions for shortly after dawn to discourage "morbid curiosity seekers" from attempting to procure tickets to witness.

On August 8, 1940, Jarman escaped from the Dwight Correctional Center and was never recaptured.

== See also ==
- Capital punishment in Illinois
- Capital punishment in the United States
- List of people executed in Illinois
- List of people executed by electrocution
