= John Louis Evans =

American murderer executed in Alabama (1950–1983)

John Louis Evans III
- Born: January 4, 1950; Beaumont, Texas, U.S.
- Died: April 22, 1983 (aged 33); Holman Correctional Facility, near Atmore, Alabama, U.S.
- Cause of death: Execution by electrocution
- Conviction: Capital murder
- Penalty: Death

John Louis Evans III (January 4, 1950 – April 22, 1983) was the first inmate to be executed by the state of Alabama after the United States reinstituted the death penalty in 1976. The manner of his execution is frequently cited by opponents of capital punishment in the United States. Evans was born in Beaumont, Texas, and was executed at the Holman Correctional Facility, then near Atmore, Alabama, at the age of 33.

== Crime, conviction and sentencing ==
After his 1976 parole from an Indiana prison, Evans and fellow convict Wayne Ritter (January 30, 1954 – August 28, 1987) embarked on a two-month-long crime spree involving, by Evans's own admission, over thirty armed robberies, nine kidnappings, and two extortion schemes across seven states. On January 5, 1977, he and Ritter robbed and killed Edward Nassar, a pawn shop owner in Mobile, Alabama, while his two young daughters were in the store. The perpetrators fled but were captured on March 7 by FBI agents in Little Rock, Arkansas. The evidence recovered was the gun used to shoot Nassar in the back and another gun stolen from the pawn shop.

Although he gave a detailed confession, prosecutors refused to accept his plea of guilty because they wanted Evans sentenced to death, and under Alabama law, this is only allowed following a conviction by a jury. Evans was tried in State Circuit Court in Mobile, Alabama on April 26, 1977, for first-degree murder committed during the commission of a robbery. During the trial, Evans again admitted to his crime and stated that he did not feel remorse and that under the same circumstances, he would kill again. Furthermore, he threatened that if the jury did not sentence him to death, he would escape and murder each of them. Despite his testimony, the jury was instructed to consider all the evidence and return a guilty verdict only if the prosecutors had left no reasonable doubt. After less than fifteen minutes of deliberation, the jury convicted Evans of the capital offense charged, thus imposing the death penalty.

Under Alabama law, all capital sentences must be affirmed by review in a higher court. The sentence of death was confirmed by the Alabama Court of Criminal Appeals and by the Alabama Supreme Court, which set the date of April 6, 1979, for his execution.

On April 2, Evans's mother, Betty, acting as "next friend", petitioned the U.S. District Court for the Southern District of Alabama for a writ of habeas corpus. The application requested the Court find Evans's conviction unconstitutional because consideration of lesser included offenses was not offered to the jury. The District Court dismissed her application on the grounds that she was not entitled to act as "next friend". She appealed to the United States Court of Appeals for the Fifth Circuit, which overturned the District Court's decision and, in fact, judged the initial criminal conviction to be invalid. In 1982, the Supreme Court of the United States granted the state's petition for a writ of certiorari, reversing the judgment of the Court of Appeals and returning to them the decision on the constitutionality of Evans's sentence.

This finding was made with two of the justices (William J. Brennan and Thurgood Marshall) entering an opinion concurring in part and dissenting in part, because they accepted the argument of the State of Alabama on the matter in question, but held that capital punishment itself was cruel and unusual punishment prohibited by the Eighth and Fourteenth Amendments to the Constitution of the United States.

In July that year, Evans fired his lawyers and filed a motion to dismiss all further appeals. The Court of Appeals accepted his motion on October 19, 1982. The Alabama Supreme Court rejected a subsequent application for a new sentencing hearing on February 18, 1983, and execution was carried out at Holman Correctional Facility, near Atmore, Alabama, on April 22.

== Execution ==
The execution is notable for its imprecision. The means of carrying out the sentence of death used at Holman Prison was an electric chair constructed by an inmate in 1927. The chair was nicknamed "Yellow Mama" because of its traffic-yellow coat of paint. It had not been used since 1965, after which a series of Supreme Court decisions created an effective moratorium on executions in the United States until the constitutionality of the death penalty was affirmed by the Court in Gregg v. Georgia (1976).

The execution was witnessed by reporter Mark Harris, who wrote this first-person account for United Press International published on May 4, 1983.

We thought that was it – bad enough, but expected and bearable.

Two doctors filed out of the witness room to examine the body and pronounce Evans dead.

The prison doctor, dressed in a blue surgical costume and tan loafers with tassels, placed a stethoscope to the smock, turned and nodded – the natural signal for "Yes, he's dead."

But the nod meant he had found a heartbeat. The other doctor confirmed the gruesome discovery.

The following description of Evans's electrocution was sworn by Evans's attorney, Russell F. Canan, on June 22, 1983:

At 8:20 p.m., the first jolt of 1,900 volts of electricity passed through Mr. Evans's body. It lasted thirty seconds. Sparks and flames erupted from the electrode tied to Mr. Evans's left leg. His body slammed against the straps holding him in the electric chair, and his fist clenched permanently. The electrode burst from the strap holding it in place. A large puff of greyish smoke and sparks poured out from under the hood that covered Mr. Evans's face. An overpowering stench of burnt flesh and clothing began pervading the witness room. Two doctors examined Mr. Evans and declared that he was not dead.

The electrode on the left leg was refastened. At 8:30 p.m. [sic] Mr. Evans was administered a second thirty-second jolt of electricity. The stench of burning flesh was nauseating. More smoke emanated from his leg and head. Again, the doctors examined Mr. Evans. The doctors reported that his heart was still beating, and that he was still alive.

At that time, I asked the prison commissioner, who was communicating on an open telephone line to Governor George Wallace, to grant clemency on the grounds that Mr. Evans was being subjected to cruel and unusual punishment. The request for clemency was denied.

At 8:40 p.m., a third charge of electricity, thirty seconds in duration, was passed through Mr. Evans's body. At 8:44, the doctors pronounced him dead. The execution of John Evans took twenty-four minutes.

Shortly before his execution, Evans was featured in an After School Special called "Dead Wrong" in which he shared his life story with young people and pleaded for them not to make the mistakes he did that led to the electric chair.

Evans's accomplice, Wayne Ritter, was electrocuted on August 28, 1987.

== See also ==
- List of people executed in Alabama
- List of people executed in the United States, 1976–1983
- List of people executed by electrocution

Executions carried out in Alabama
Preceded by William Bowen Jr. January 15, 1965	John Louis Evans; April 22, 1983	Succeeded by Arthur Lee Jones March 21, 1986
Executions carried out in the United States
Preceded by Charles Brooks Jr. – Texas December 7, 1982	John Louis Evans – Alabama; April 22, 1983	Succeeded by Jimmy Lee Gray – Mississippi September 2, 1983
Executions carried out in Alabama
Preceded by Arthur Lee Jones March 21, 1986	Wayne Eugene Ritter; August 28, 1987	Succeeded by Michael Lindsey May 26, 1989
Executions carried out in the United States
Preceded by Beauford James White – Florida August 28, 1987	Wayne Eugene Ritter – Alabama; August 28, 1987	Succeeded by Dale Selby Pierre – Utah August 28, 1987
