= Steven Judy =

American mass murderer (1956–1981)

- Born: Steven Timothy Judy; May 24, 1956; Indianapolis, Indiana, U.S.
- Died: March 9, 1981 (aged 24); Indiana State Prison, Michigan City, Indiana, U.S.
- Cause of death: Execution by electrocution
- Resting place: Floral Park Cemetery in Indianapolis, Indiana
- Conviction: Murder (4 counts)
- Penalty: Death (February 25, 1980)

Details
- Victims: 4 confirmed, 7 confessed, 10+ suspected
- Date: April 28, 1979 (Chasteen murders)
- Span of crimes: 1973–1979

Steven Timothy Judy (May 24, 1956 – March 9, 1981) was an American mass murderer and suspected serial killer who was convicted of murdering Terry Lee Chasteen and her three children Misty Ann, Steve, and Mark, on April 28, 1979. He was executed for the murders on March 9, 1981, via electrocution, becoming the first person to be executed in Indiana since 1961.

== Early life ==
Steven Judy was born on May 24, 1956, the son of Myrtle and Vernon Judy. As a child, he grew up in an environment where there was violence, pornography, alcohol, and crime. His father had a history of being arrested for assaulting his mother. One afternoon, his father caught his mother cheating on him and responded to the incident by killing the family's dog. As a result, Steven Judy's defense attorney, Steven L. Harris, stated, "that's all he's known since the day he was born." Judy recalled, "There [are] times when I can remember my mother pulling a gun [...] on my dad and trying to shoot him." As a child, Judy was caught burning down a neighbor's garage and stabbing a classmate with a compass. When he was 10 years old, he started to pursue high school females. He would push them to the ground and molest them.

At the age of 13, Judy pretended to be a Boy Scout, forced himself into a woman's home, raped her, and then tried to kill her with a pocketknife. The pocketknife broke before he could kill the woman. However, he fractured her skull and cut off one of her fingers. At the trial, Judy initially claimed he had nothing to do with the assault. Once the investigators brought up his past incidents, he pleaded insanity. He was found guilty and sentenced to six months in a juvenile detention center and was then sent to a mental hospital. At the hospital he received treatment for his diagnosis as a "sexual psychopath". Once released, Judy was placed into foster care and sent to live with Robert and Mary Carr, who were not informed about Judy's record.

== Murders ==
On Saturday, April 28, 1979, Terry Lee Chasteen was on her way to drop her children off at a babysitter's house before going to work. While on the road, Judy passed her car and gave her a sign that indicated that she needed to pull over. She eventually did and accepted help from Judy, whom she thought was just being a good samaritan. He told her that something was wrong with her tire and offered to fix it. While examining her tire, he disabled the car and offered Chasteen and her three children a ride. He then drove them to White Lick Creek.

Once at the Creek, Judy directed the three children to a path, having them walk ahead of him and Chasteen. Once the children were ahead of them, Judy raped Chasteen, tied her hands and feet, and began choking her. Chasteen began screaming for help and her children ran back to them. Later that day, police officers discovered the bodies of Chasteen and her three children: Misty (5 years old), Stephen (4 years old), and Mark (2 years old). Evidence was found that Chasteen had died from being strangled, while the children were drowned. Several witnesses eventually came forward to help the police piece together who the murderer was.

== Trial ==
The arrest of Judy triggered an emotional outcry that lasted two years. He pleaded insanity and confessed to committing the murders. While in the punishment phase of the trial, Judy wanted it to be fast-paced, so he threatened the judge and jury and promised to kill again unless they sentenced him to death. On February 2, 1980, Judy was convicted on four counts of murder. On February 25, he was sentenced to death. Before he was sentenced, Judy told the judge, "I honestly want you to give me the death penalty. Because someday, somehow, I might get out. I think I've already shown that."

== Execution ==
After waiving his appeals, Judy was executed on March 9, 1981, at the age of 24, at the Indiana State Prison in Michigan City in the electric chair. His last meal consisted of prime rib, lobster tails, potatoes with sour cream, chef salad with French dressing and a dinner roll. He also requested four cans of beer but they were denied. Judy became the first person to be executed in Indiana since Richard Kiefer was executed on June 15, 1961.

== Other possible murders ==
In the week before he was executed, Judy confessed to his foster mother, Mary Carr, that he had raped and murdered other women in multiple states. He told Carr that he had killed more women than he could recall. The first murders Judy confessed to were the 1973 slayings of two women in Louisiana, which occurred while he was staying in New Orleans. He also confessed to the November 1978 murder of Linda Unverzagt, a disco dance instructor in Indianapolis. He confessed to another possible murder of a woman in Louisiana, whom he kidnapped and raped. After raping her, he threw her into a swamp, and did not know if she survived. There were two other possible murders he committed in Indianapolis. Judy raped two women in separate incidents. After raping one of the victims in 1978, he left her tied to a tree in a heavily wooded area, and did not know if she survived the ordeal.

In 2002, author Bette Nunn theorized that Judy could have been responsible for the 1977 murder of Ann Harmeier, a 20-year-old student who attended Indiana University. Harmeier disappeared on September 12, 1977, and her body was found five weeks later in a cornfield, approximately five miles from where her car was found. She had been raped and strangled. Her death was similar to Terry Chasteen's: both women were kidnapped from highways by someone who offered them help, both were raped and strangled with items they had on them, and both were dumped in isolated areas in Morgan County. However, an Indiana State Police review of jail records showed that Judy was imprisoned in the Marion County Jail on the day Harmeier disappeared. It has been theorized that the information about Judy's incarceration could have been wrong, however. Harmeier's mother, who died in 1983, believed Judy murdered her daughter. Harmeier's murder remains unsolved and is still being investigated by cold case detectives.

== See also ==
- Capital punishment in Indiana
- Capital punishment in the United States
- List of people executed in Indiana
- List of people executed in the United States, 1976–1983
- Volunteer (capital punishment)
- List of people executed by electrocution

Executions carried out in Indiana
| Preceded by Richard Kiefer June 15, 1961 | Steven Judy; March 9, 1981 | Succeeded by William Vandiver October 16, 1985 |
Executions carried out in the United States
| Preceded by Jesse Bishop – Nevada October 22, 1979 | Steven Judy – Indiana; March 9, 1981 | Succeeded by Frank J. Coppola – Virginia August 10, 1982 |
