= Nollie Martin =

American convicted murderer (1949–1992)

Nollie Lee Martin
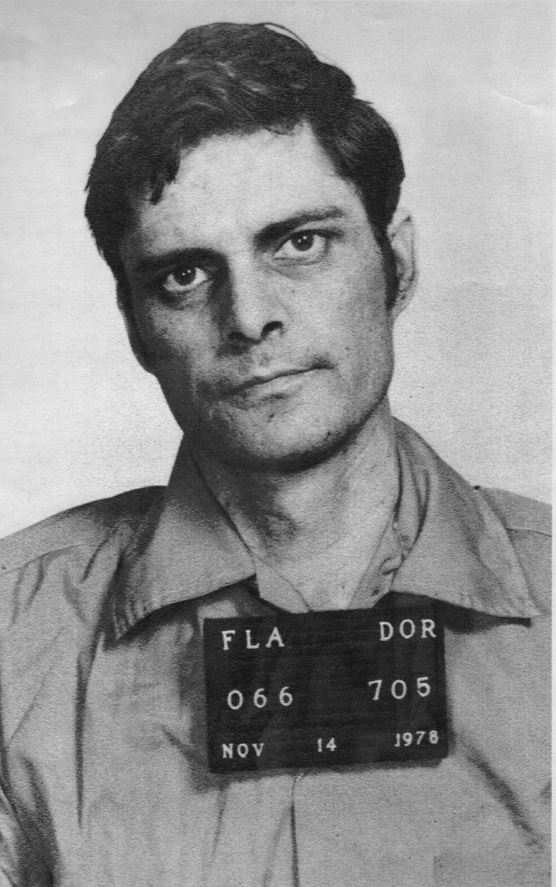
- Martin 1978 Mugshot
- Born: January 29, 1949; North Carolina, U.S.
- Died: May 12, 1992 (aged 43); Florida State Prison, Florida, U.S.
- Status: Executed by electric chair
- Convictions: North Carolina: Second-degree murder (×3); Florida: First-degree murder; Rape; Robbery; Kidnapping
- Penalty: North Carolina: 18 to 30 years imprisonment; Florida: Death

Details
- Victims: 4
- Date: 1972 – 1977
- Country: United States
- States: North Carolina, Florida
- Locations: High Point, North Carolina; Delray Beach, Florida
- Imprisoned at: Union Correctional Institution

Nollie Lee Martin (January 29, 1949 – May 12, 1992) was an American convicted serial killer and mass murderer found guilty of murdering four people in the 1970s. In June 1972, Martin started a fire at an apartment building in High Point, North Carolina, which killed Josephine Hogan and her two daughters, Karen and Linda. Martin, charged with triple homicide, accepted a plea deal and admitted to three counts of second-degree murder, and was sentenced to 18–30 years in prison. Martin was paroled after he served 4 1/2 years behind bars.

On June 25, 1977, shortly after his release, Martin and his cousin Gary Paul Forbes kidnapped, raped and murdered 19-year-old George Washington University student Patricia Greenfield in Delray Beach, Florida. Forbes was sentenced to 99 years plus life for second-degree murder, kidnapping, robbery and rape, while Martin was sentenced to death and executed for first-degree murder on May 12, 1992.

== Hogan family murders ==
On June 28, 1972, in High Point, North Carolina, Nollie Lee Martin (alias James "Jimmy" Martin), then 23 years old, started a fire at the apartment building where he resided, and the fire killed a family of three who lived across the hall from him. The victims were 50-year-old Josephine Hogan and her two daughters, 14-year-old Karen and ten-year-old Linda. Fire and police officials investigated the blaze to determine its cause. Evidence increasingly indicated that the fire had been deliberately set using lighter fluid as an accelerant. Martin became an early suspect after firefighters observed that he was fully dressed when the fire broke out at approximately 3:00 a.m., despite his statement that he had been asleep when he awoke to screams and the smell of smoke. Martin himself was also injured in the fire and hospitalized in the High Point Memorial Hospital for burn wounds at the time he became a suspect behind the triple murder.

Investigators searched Martin's apartment and recovered a jacket containing two bottles that reportedly smelled of lighter fluid. Martin, who sustained burns during the fire and was being treated at High Point Memorial Hospital, was arrested on July 5, 1972, while still hospitalized. Police maintained a guard outside his hospital room until he was discharged and transferred to jail. After his arrest, Martin was charged with three counts of first-degree murder, one count of arson, and with stealing the family's television and stereo equipment.

During questioning at the hospital, Martin confessed to setting the fire. His attorneys later challenged the admissibility of the confession, stating that investigators had requested that his pain medication be withheld before the interview, thereby affecting the circumstances under which the statement was obtained. Law enforcement officers denied those allegations. Contemporary newspaper accounts reported differing explanations for Martin's motive. Some reports stated that he became upset after learning that his wife intended to leave him. Others suggested he set the fire to destroy evidence related to the theft of the Hogan family's property, while another account claimed he intended to create an emergency in which he could rescue residents and be regarded as a hero. No single motive was conclusively established in court.

== First murder trial and sentence ==
In late 1972, Nollie Martin was indicted by a grand jury on three counts of first-degree murder and one count of arson. Before trial, he underwent a 60-day psychiatric evaluation at Cherry Hospital in Goldsboro, North Carolina, to determine his competency to stand trial and his ability to distinguish right from wrong. He was found competent at the end of his psychiatric evaluation, and the trial of Martin for the triple murder was scheduled for mid-January 1973.

The trial court conducted a pre-trial hearing on the admissibility of Martin's hospital confession. Midway through the proceedings, Martin reached a plea deal with the prosecution, agreeing to plead guilty to three reduced counts of second-degree murder for the killing of the Hogans. Under North Carolina law, the offense of first-degree murder carries the death penalty as the maximum sentence. As a result of the plea bargain, Martin no longer faced the death penalty for the triple murder.

After pleading guilty, Martin was sentenced to 18 to 30 years' imprisonment. He served about 4 1/2 years in the Roanoke River Correctional Institution, before he was granted parole and released on April 13, 1977, partially due to prison overcrowding in the state's penitentiary system. Martin returned to High Point but could not find a job given his murder conviction. Eventually, he relocated to Delray Beach, Florida, where a distant relative offered Martin a job at a service station he operated.

== Murder of Patricia Greenfield ==
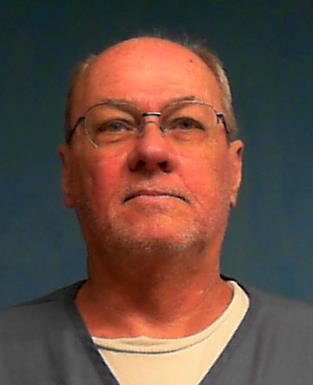
Gary Paul Forbes

On June 25, 1977, two months after his release from prison, 28-year-old Martin and his 18-year-old cousin Gary Paul Forbes, whose father gave Martin a service station job after his release, committed the murder of Patricia Ann "Patty" Greenfield, a 19-year-old convenience store clerk and a student at George Washington University. On that day, Martin and Forbes went to a Delray Beach convenience store and robbed Greenfield at knifepoint, taking approximately $90 and two cases of beer, before they kidnapped Greenfield and forced her into their car, and blindfolded her with Martin's shirt.

After abducting Greenfield, Martin and Forbes took Greenfield back to the former's apartment and raped her. The victim was brought out of the apartment, still blindfolded and under assurances that she would be released in a remote area. The pair drove around aimlessly before stopping at a county landfill. While Forbes waited in the car, Martin walked Greenfield away from the car, until he was out of Forbes's sight, and attempted to use a rope to strangle Greenfield. Greenfield resisted and was still breathing, so Martin stabbed her in the neck several times with a knife and left her to die in the landfill. Her body was discovered four days after her murder.

On July 3, 1977, more than a week after the murder of Greenfield, Martin and Forbes kidnapped a hitchhiker, whom they took to Martin's apartment, where they tied her to the bed and raped her at knifepoint. When the pair left the apartment, the woman was still tied to the bed, but she freed herself and sought help from a neighbor, who called the police. The woman identified Martin and Forbes as her attackers. Within a day, the police arrested them, and they were subsequently linked to the murder of Greenfield.

== Second murder trial ==
After their arrests, Forbes and Martin were charged with Greenfield's murder, as well as the kidnapping of the hitchhiker a week after the killing. A week after his arrest, Martin was also charged with attacking a parole officer while at the Palm Beach County Jail.

A series of court hearings was held to determine Martin's psychiatric state and whether he was fit to plead and stand trial. Three state psychiatric experts testified that Martin was mentally fit to stand trial for the murder of Greenfield. However, the defense's psychiatric expert testified that Martin was insane when he confessed to the killing and suffering from paranoid schizophrenia at the time of the offense.

Later that month, Martin stood trial after he was deemed mentally competent, and jury selection was completed by late April 1978. During the trial, the defense argued that Martin was suffering from diminished responsibility and was of unsound mind when he killed Greenfield, and incapable of controlling his actions when the crime was committed. However, the prosecution contended that Martin was in full control of his mental faculties at the time he committed the murder of Greenfield. The jury was also allowed to hear Martin's confession, in which he described how he killed Greenfield.

On April 29, 1978, the jury found Martin guilty of first-degree murder, and West Palm Beach prosecutor Ann Vitunac stated she would seek the death penalty for Martin.

On May 15, 1978, the jury recommended the death penalty for Martin. On November 13, 1978, Martin was formally sentenced to death via electrocution by Circuit Judge Marvin Mounts, who accepted the jury's recommendation. Martin also received three life sentences for the other charges of robbery, rape and kidnapping.

Forbes pleaded guilty in February 1978 to a lesser charge of second-degree murder through a plea bargain arranged with the prosecution, and agreed to testify for the prosecution in Martin's trial. On August 23, 1978, Forbes was sentenced to 99 years for second-degree murder, in addition to three life sentences for kidnapping, rape, and robbery. As of 2026, Forbes remains incarcerated at the Marion Correctional Institution.

On February 1, 1979, Martin pleaded guilty to the unrelated kidnapping of the hitchhiker, which occurred sometime after Greenfield's murder, and he was sentenced to three years' imprisonment.

== Appeals ==
On September 8, 1982, the Florida Supreme Court dismissed Martin's appeal and upheld his death sentence and murder conviction.

On March 28, 1983, the U.S. Supreme Court denied Martin's appeal against his death sentence. On August 8, 1984, Governor Bob Graham signed death warrants for Martin and Ernest John Dobbert, scheduling their executions for September 6, 1984. However, 15 hours before the execution date, Martin received an indefinite stay of execution while his appeal was processed. Dobbert, who was sentenced for torturing and killing his daughter and son, was similarly granted a temporary stay of execution, but was ultimately executed by electrocution on September 7, 1984, after the expiration of his stay and rejection of his final appeals.

On October 21, 1986, Governor Graham signed the death warrants of Martin and infamous serial killer Ted Bundy, scheduling them to be executed on November 18, 1986. On November 14, 1986, four days before his scheduled execution date, Martin was granted an indefinite stay of execution by Governor Graham, who acknowledged that the defense needed time to argue about Martin's mental competency for execution. Bundy, who was convicted of killing three out of his 36 victims, was also granted a stay of execution, and he was eventually executed on January 24, 1989.

A year later, Martin and another death row inmate, Bennie Demps, had their death warrants signed and their executions were scheduled for November 5, 1987. Demps was found guilty and condemned for the murder of a fellow prisoner during his life sentence for a prior double murder. Martin's execution date, however, was once again staved off when the Florida Supreme Court granted him another reprieve, ruling that his mental competency claims should be fully litigated before he could be executed. Similar to Martin, Demps also received a stay of execution, and he remained on death row for another 13 years before he was executed on June 7, 2000.

On October 1, 1990, the U.S. Supreme Court rejected the appeals of Martin and two other death row prisoners against their respective death sentences.

== Execution ==
On April 8, 1992, a fourth death warrant was signed for Martin, scheduling his execution to take place on May 6, 1992.

In a final bid to spare him the death sentence, Martin's defense counsel filed appeals and sought to prove that their client was mentally incompetent to be executed on psychiatric grounds. They shared a 15-minute videotape that filmed some of Martin's activities in his solitary death row cell. In the tape, Martin was shown to be rocking continually, picking at his dry skin until it bled, cradling his head, and incoherently muttering about murdering Greenfield and the Hogans. Counsel argued that based on these filmed acts, Martin was too mentally unstable to be executed; they asked that the death sentence be commuted to life imprisonment.

On May 4, 1992, Martin's appeal was rejected by Palm Beach County Circuit Court Judge William Gary. The Florida Supreme Court also rejected Martin's follow-up appeal.

On May 5, 1992, about 13 1/2 hours before his scheduled execution, U.S. District Judge James Lawrence King ruled that Martin had raised several constitutional issues and the execution should be stayed to conduct a hearing on Martin's mental competency to be executed. Martin's death warrant remained in effect until May 12, 1992, making it possible for him to be executed within the next week.

On May 8, 1992, Martin's appeal was denied by Judge James King, after he concluded that Martin was mentally competent for execution, and cited that the defence rehashed their arguments regarding the issue. However, he allowed the stay order to remain in effect until 5:00 pm on May 11, 1992, to provide counsel sufficient time to appeal to the 11th Circuit Court of Appeals.

Martin's counsel appealed to the 11th Circuit Court of Appeals and continued to argue that their client was mentally incompetent to be executed. On the morning of May 11, 1992, the 11th Circuit Court of Appeals dismissed Martin's appeal. Later that same day, the U.S. Supreme Court denied a final appeal from Martin, whose execution was tentatively set for 7am on May 12, 1992.

On May 12, 1992, 43-year-old Nollie Lee Martin was put to death in the electric chair at the Florida State Prison. Martin was pronounced dead at 7:13am, less than a minute after the chair was activated with 2,000 volts of electricity. For his last meal, Martin was served with steak, fried eggs, baked potato, tossed salad and strawberry cheesecake, although he reportedly ate little of the food. In his final statement, Martin expressed sympathy for the victim and apologized to the family, stating that he probably deserved to die, and his death may provide him relief from the torture he endured for the past 15 years.

== Aftermath ==
Nollie Martin remained the last person executed for a Palm Beach County murder case for 21 years before William Van Poyck was executed in 2013 for killing a West Palm Beach corrections officer Fred Griffis, and was the first of three Palm Beach County prisoners (the two others were William Van Poyck and Duane Owen) executed in Florida since 1976. Martin was also one of the notable criminals executed for crimes committed in the Treasure Coast region of Florida.

The murder of Greenfield was regarded as one of the most infamous crimes to occur in Delray Beach, Florida. In a 1987 interview, Gary Forbes's father, who was the same relative that helped Martin get a job in his service station and even helped securing his parole, stated that he paid a price for helping Martin, which indirectly led to the murder. As for Greenfield's parents, they stated that they were able to cope with the sadness of losing their daughter with their religious faith. Greenfield's parents also stated that they harbored no ill feelings towards Martin, but they believed that he should be executed and he deserved it, since it was "the law of God" and he had killed an innocent person.

== See also ==
- Janet Danahey - another infamous arsonist from North Carolina
- Capital punishment in Florida
- List of people executed in Florida
- List of people executed by electrocution
- List of people executed in the United States in 1992
- List of serial killers in the United States
