= Ernest Dobbert =

American convicted child murderer

Ernest John Dobbert Jr.
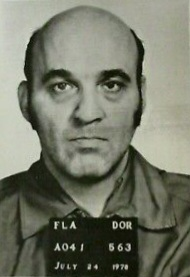
- Dobbert's 1978 FDOC mugshot
- Born: February 26, 1938; Wisconsin, U.S.
- Died: September 7, 1984 (aged 46); Florida State Prison, Florida, U.S.
- Status: Executed by electric chair
- Convictions: First-degree murder; Second-degree murder; Child torture; Child abuse
- Penalty: Death

Details
- Victims: 2
- Date: 1971 – 1972
- Country: United States
- State: Florida
- Location: Jacksonville, Florida
- Date apprehended: March 1973
- Imprisoned at: Union Correctional Institution

Ernest John Dobbert Jr. (February 26, 1938 – September 7, 1984) was an American convicted child murderer. Dobbert was found guilty of the murders of his two children, Kelly and Ryder Dobbert, in Jacksonville, Florida. Dobbert killed Kelly in December 1971 and Ryder in early 1972, and he abused his two surviving children. Dobbert was found guilty of the first-degree murder of Kelly, the second-degree murder of Ryder, and the abuse of his two surviving children, and sentenced to death on the first-degree murder charge. Dobbert was executed by electrocution on September 7, 1984.

== Murders of Kelly and Ryder Dobbert ==
Between December 1971 and early 1972, in Jacksonville, Florida, Ernest John Dobbert Jr. separately committed the murders of his daughter and son, Kelly Ann Dobbert and Ryder Scott Dobbert, respectively.

During the final few months leading up to the murder of Kelly on December 31, 1971, Dobbert, a native of Milwaukee, Wisconsin, had relentlessly and severely abused his four children (two daughters and two sons). In the case of Kelly, Dobbert had repeatedly beaten, kicked and burned her, and on one instance, Dobbert had beaten the nine-year-old girl "until it was swollen like she was pregnant", and in another instance, he poked his fingers into her eyes, and at one point, Dobbert kicked Kelly against a table which cut her head and he used a needle and thread to stitch her head wound by himself. On the day she died, Kelly was being choked by her father until she stopped breathing, and after Kelly's murder, Dobbert placed her body in a plastic garbage bag and buried it in an unmarked grave with the help of his 11-year-old elder son, Ernest John III.

Sometime between January and April 1972, Dobbert killed his seven-year-old younger son, Ryder, after he also severely tortured and mistreated him. According to Ernest John III, his father had hidden the bodies of his sister and brother in the attic and spare bedroom respectively until they began to decompose and became infested with maggots, and their bodies were buried somewhere in Jacksonville; Ryder's death date was purportedly sometime in February 1972, according to Ernest John III.

Later that year, Ernest John III was found battered and wandering alone in Jacksonville, and he was said to have a broken arm, a burned back, broken nose, fractured ribs and his eyes nearly gouged and blinded. The boy was sent for treatment, and this discovery gradually led to the revelation of the murders. The police later discovered Honore Elizabeth, the missing five-year-old younger daughter of Dobbert, being kept in a Fort Lauderdale hospital, with a note pinned to her clothing, asking for the girl to be sent to her mother in Wisconsin. An arrest warrant was issued for Dobbert, and police conducted a search for him. Later, the police found Dobbert's abandoned car near a bridge and they also recovered a message which resembled a suicide note.

Dobbert's two surviving children were set to reunite with their mother, who was released from a Wisconsin prison for passing a bad check at that time. They were also declared as wards of the state and were ordered to accept psychiatric treatment. Their mother also publicly appealed for Dobbert to surrender himself and face the law for what he did to the children.

Eventually, Dobbert was found to have fled to Texas instead of committing suicide as implied by his written letter, and in March 1973, he was arrested in Houston and extradited back to Florida to face charges for the murders of Ryder and Kelly.

== Trial ==
On December 27, 1973, Ernest Dobbert was charged with two counts of first-degree murder and two counts of child torture and a Duval County grand jury indicted Dobbert for all charges.

On March 27, 1974, the jury found Dobbert guilty of the first-degree murder of Kelly, the second-degree murder of Ryder, and both the child torture of Ernest John III and the child abuse of Honore.

On March 29, 1974, the jury voted 10–2 to recommend life imprisonment for Dobbert instead of death. Dobbert was scheduled to be sentenced by a judge on April 12, 1974. Prior to Dobbert's sentencing, the trial judge received more than 20 letters, in which all the senders urged the court to sentence Dobbert to death for murdering his daughter.

On April 12, 1974, Circuit Judge Hudson Olliff overrode the jury's recommendation of life imprisonment and sentenced Dobbert to death by electrocution for the first-degree murder of Kelly, citing that the nature of the crime was especially heinous, atrocious and cruel, much more than any other past cases he presided over. Dobbert was also sentenced to 30 years for the second-degree murder of Ryder, plus 15 years and one year for the of Ernest John III and abuse of Honore.

== Appeals ==
On January 14, 1976, the Florida Supreme Court rejected Ernest Dobbert's direct appeal against his death sentence.

On August 31, 1976, Dobbert filed an appeal to the U.S. Supreme Court against his death sentence. In November 1976, the U.S. Supreme Court agreed to formally review his case on a later date.

On March 28, 1977, the U.S. Supreme Court heard the appeal of Dobbert, who argued that he should not be sentenced to death given that he committed the crime at the time when the current death penalty law was not enacted, and the trial court erred in not moving the trial venue out of Jacksonville as the local pre-trial publicity could potentially infringe on Dobbert's right to a fair and impartial trial.

On June 17, 1977, the U.S. Supreme Court rejected Dobbert's appeal and ruled that Dobbert should still be sentenced to death even when his crime took place during the period when the current death penalty statutes were not in effect, since the trial itself took place when the death penalty laws were passed and enacted, and there was no procedural issue with this.

In May 1978, Dobbert's death sentence was overturned by Circuit Judge Hudson Olliff, after he followed an order by the Florida Supreme Court to vacate his death sentence, after the defence argued that Olliff should be granted an opportunity to respond to the findings of a pre-sentencing investigation against him. A re-sentencing hearing was held on June 22, 1978, and Dobbert recounted how he killed Ryder and Kelly, and expressed remorse for what happened, and he stated that as a born-again Christian, he deserved a second chance to live and use his story to prevent similar tragedies in the future.

On June 30, 1978, Dobbert was re-sentenced to death for the murder of his daughter, and Circuit Judge Hudson Olliff cited that Dobbert's claim to have found Christ did not negate or downplay the horrific and heinous nature of the murder and Dobbert was able to comprehend the criminality of his actions since he admitted to hiding them from the authorities and never sought medical help for the children to treat their wounds. The judge further pointed out that as a father, Dobbert was the same person his children sought love, protection and understanding from but he instead subjected them to "terror, brutality, mutilation, blindness and finally death".

On July 6, 1979, the Florida Supreme Court denied Dobbert's appeal and affirmed his death sentence.

In June 1981, Dobbert petitioned for clemency from the governor to commute hia death sentence. Later that same month, Dobbert's first death warrant was signed by the governor, and he received an execution date of July 22, 1981. However, it was stayed due to a lawsuit filed by the state's 123 death row inmates seeking to overturn their sentences due to the Florida judges reading secret reports of their cases while their appeals were pending. The lawsuit was rejected by the U.S. Supreme Court in November 1981.

On January 6, 1982, Governor Bob Graham signed a death warrant for Dobbert, scheduling an execution date of February 2, 1982, for him. Another prisoner, Anthony Antone, was also slated to be executed on the same date as Dobbert. The two men appealed to the courts for a stay of execution, and eventually, on February 1, 1982, the eve of their executions, the 11th Circuit Court of Appeals granted their appeals and stayed their executions. Dobbert's appeal was scheduled to be heard by the 11th Circuit Court of Appeals on February 12, 1982.

On May 1, 1984, Circuit Judge Hudson Olliff refused to grant Dobbert's request for a new trial and upheld his death sentence.

On July 4, 1984, Dobbert's appeal was denied by the U.S. Supreme Court.

== Execution ==
On August 8, 1984, Governor Bob Graham signed a death warrant for both Ernest Dobbert and rapist-murderer Nollie Martin, scheduling them to be executed on September 6, 1984.

On August 28, 1984, Dobbert's appeal for a stay of execution was turned down by the Florida Supreme Court.

On September 4, 1984, the 11th Circuit Court of Appeals granted a 27-hour stay of execution for Dobbert while they conducted a hearing to process the last-minute appeal of Dobbert.

Subsequently, the 11th Circuit Court of Appeals dismissed Dobbert's appeal and allowed the execution to move forward at 10am on September 7, 1984, upon the expiry of the execution stay order. A final appeal was filed to the U.S. Supreme Court, but hours before the rescheduled execution timing of 10am, the U.S. Supreme Court rejected the appeal.

On September 7, 1984, 46-year-old Ernest John Dobbert Jr. was put to death in the electric chair at the Florida State Prison, and he was pronounced dead at 10:09am. He declined to make a last statement and also did not request a special last meal. Outside the prison, 20 pro-death penalty advocates gathered to support his execution and they applauded and cheered when his death was announced. At the time of his execution, Dobbert was reportedly dubbed "the most hated man on Florida's Death Row" due to his crimes of torturing and murdering his children.

== See also ==
- Capital punishment in Florida
- List of people executed in Florida
- List of people executed by electrocution
- List of people executed in the United States in 1984
