= Eleanor Jarman =

American fugitive

- Jarman in 1933
- Born: Ella Marie Berendt; April 22, 1901; Sioux City, Iowa, US
- Disappeared: August 8, 1940 (aged 39)
- Status: Missing for 86 years, 2 months and 20 days; presumed dead in absentia (Note: Jarman was never found after her escape, but today she would be at an age where it is almost guaranteed she would be dead.)
- Other name: "Blonde Tigress"
- Known for: Escaping from prison; never apprehended
- Spouse: Michael Roy Jarman
- Children: 2
- Mother: Amelia Berendt

Eleanor Jarman (born Ella Marie Berendt; April 22, 1901 – disappeared August 8, 1940) was an American fugitive who was imprisoned and escaped from custody in 1940. Jarman was never apprehended, and (without an exhumation) her ultimate whereabouts remain unknown.

== Early life and crime career ==
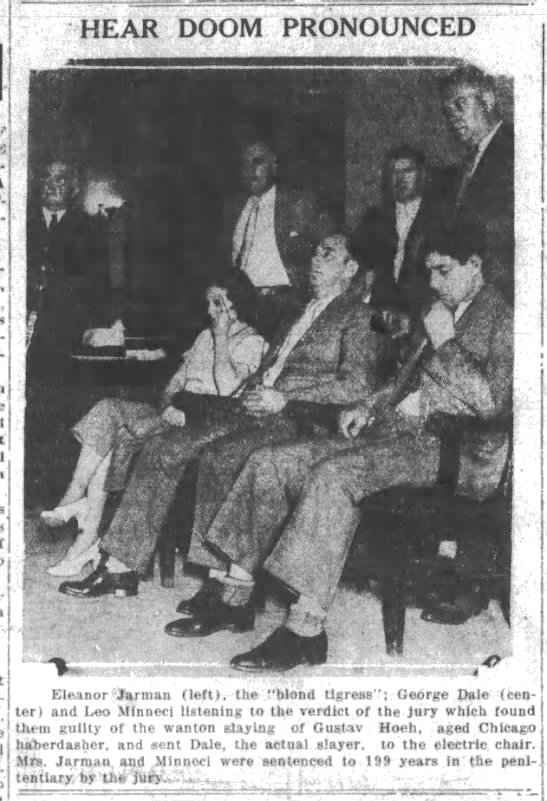
(From left to right) Eleanor Jarman, George Dale, and Leo Minneci hearing their sentences for the murder of Gustav Hoeh, 1933

Jarman was one of 12 children (3 died young) born to German immigrants Julius and Amelia Berendt, in 1901, in Sioux City, Iowa. She worked as a waitress since age twelve and dropped out of school due to her family's poverty.

She married Michael Roy Jarman, and they had two children, LeRoy and LaVerne. The family moved to Chicago, Illinois, where Michael Roy abandoned the family and Eleanor worked primarily as a waitress until she met George Dale. Dale entered a relationship with Jarman and lived at her apartment, supporting the Jarman family by robbing small shops in Chicago's West Side. In the spring and summer of 1933, Eleanor became an accomplice.

On August 4, 1933, Dale, Jarman, and the getaway driver Leo Minneci tried to rob a clothing store. But, in a struggle, Dale shot and killed the shop owner, Gustav Hoeh.

When the robbers drove away, several witnesses noted the license plate. That led police to Minneci, who was the first to be arrested. He blamed Dale and Jarman for the robbery. Jarman claimed she was in the back room looking at clothes.

Witnesses gave contradictory statements as to how many shots were fired and what role Jarman had played in the crime. The press (primarily to sell newspapers) exaggerated Jarman's involvement and dubbed her "the Blonde Tigress." She was compared to her contemporary Bonnie Parker (of Bonnie and Clyde).

In a trial that lasted less than a week, Jarman was convicted as an accomplice in the murder, even though it had become clear that Dale had pulled the trigger. The prosecuting attorney, Wilbur Crowley, called for the death penalty for all three – Dale, Jarman, and Minneci.

George Dale, however, was the only one sentenced to the electric chair. As his last wish, he wrote a love letter to Jarman.

Jarman and Minneci each were sentenced to prison for 199 years, one of the longest criminal sentences ever imposed at the time. Jarman's children were sent to live with her older sister and her husband, Hattie and Joe Stocker, in Sioux City, Iowa.

== After imprisonment ==
=== A model prisoner and escape ===
For the next seven years, Jarman was a model prisoner at the Dwight Correctional Center (Illinois). In 1940, according to her family, she heard that her son was about to run away from home and, concerned about her children, escaped the prison on August 8, 1940, with another inmate, Mary Foster. At the time of the escape, Jarman was 39 years old. She apparently went to Sioux City, Iowa, confirmed that her children were all right and then went underground.

=== The 1975 meeting ===
Over the next 35 years, Jarman maintained surreptitious contact with her family by publishing coded messages in classified newspaper ads. In 1975, she arranged a secret meeting with her brother Otto Berendt, his wife Dorothy, and Jarman's son Leroy, by then in middle-age. Jarman was 74 years old around the time of the meeting. During this meeting, which the family disclosed decades later, Leroy tried to persuade his mother to give herself up. She refused and said that she was not worried about capture, believing the authorities had long since stopped looking for her. After the meeting, she was last seen by her family heading towards a Greyhound station and disappeared shortly afterwards.

=== After 1975 ===
After the 1975 meeting, Jarman continued to contact her family by coded messages in classified newspaper ads. Her family claimed that their communication tapered off in the mid-1990s. A 1993 petition to grant Jarman a pardon failed.

Although Jarman officially remained a fugitive, she was born in 1901 (125 years ago), so it is essentially certain that she is dead, and that her death and burial was recorded under an alias.

Jarman's grandson, Doug Jarman, requested clemency for his grandmother in 1994, saying he believed Eleanor to still be alive since she had promised her children to inform them of her death through third-parties. He subsequently told the Chicago Tribune that he received a letter from someone claiming to be his grandmother, asking for money to pay for medical treatment, which he believed to be authentic as it was sent to an address of his that was not publicly available.

Jarman's life is the subject of Silvia Pettem's book, In Search of the Blonde Tigress: The Untold Story of Eleanor Jarman. The book concludes, based on historical records that Jarman was the same person as Marie Millman, who worked as a waitress in Denver between 1951 and the 1970s before dying in 1980. Jarman's grandson had previously told reporters during the clemency petition that his grandmother used the alias "Marie Mellman or Millman". Pettem acknowledges that the assumption is based solely on archive research searching for the name provided by her grandson, which was sourced from his father, i.e. Jarman's son LeRoy.

== See also ==
- Fugitives from justice
- List of fugitives from justice who disappeared
