= List of people executed in the United States, 1976–1983 =

Eleven people, all male, were executed in the United States between 1976–1983, seven by electrocution, two by gas chamber, one by lethal injection, and one by firing squad. Gary Mark Gilmore was the first person to be executed since the U.S. death penalty reinstatement in 1976, and the first overall since Luis Monge in 1967. John Spenkelink, meanwhile, was the first person to be involuntarily executed since Aaron Mitchell, also in 1967. 1982 saw the first execution in the U.S. to use lethal injection with the execution of Charles Brooks Jr.

== List of people executed in the United States between 1976–1983 ==
No.	Date of execution	Name	Age of person			Gender	Ethnicity	State	Method	Ref.
No.	Date of execution	Name	At execution	At offense	Age difference	Gender	Ethnicity	State	Method	Ref.
1	January 17, 1977	Gary Mark Gilmore	36	35	1	Male	White	Utah	Firing squad	
2	May 25, 1979	John Arthur Spenkelink	30	23	7	Male	White	Florida	Electrocution	
3	October 22, 1979	Jesse Walter Bishop	46	44	2	Male	White	Nevada	Gas chamber	
4	March 9, 1981	Steven Timothy Judy	24	22	2	Male	White	Indiana	Electrocution	
5	August 10, 1982	Frank Joseph Coppola	38	34	4	Male	White	Virginia	Electrocution	
6	December 7, 1982	Charles Brooks Jr.	40	34	6	Male	Black	Texas	Lethal injection	
7	April 22, 1983	John Louis Evans III	33	27	6	Male	White	Alabama	Electrocution	
8	September 2, 1983	Jimmy Lee Gray	34	27	7	Male	White	Mississippi	Gas chamber	
9	November 30, 1983	Robert Austin Sullivan	36	25	11	Male	White	Florida	Electrocution	
10	December 14, 1983	Robert Wayne Williams	31	26	5	Male	Black	Louisiana	Electrocution	
11	December 15, 1983	John Eldon Smith	53	43	10	Male	White	Georgia	Electrocution	
		Average:	36 years	31 years	6 years					

== Demographics ==
Gender
Male	11	100%
Female	0	0%
Ethnicity
White	9	82%
Black	2	18%
State
Florida	2	18%
Alabama	1	9%
Georgia	1	9%
Indiana	1	9%
Louisiana	1	9%
Mississippi	1	9%
Nevada	1	9%
Texas	1	9%
Utah	1	9%
Virginia	1	9%
Method
Electrocution	7	64%
Gas chamber	2	18%
Firing squad	1	9%
Lethal injection	1	9%
Month
January	1	9%
February	0	0%
March	1	9%
April	1	9%
May	1	9%
June	0	0%
July	0	0%
August	1	9%
September	1	9%
October	1	9%
November	1	9%
December	3	27%
Age
20–29	1	9%
30–39	7	64%
40–49	2	18%
50–59	1	9%
Total	11	100%

== Executions in recent years ==
Number of executions
1984	21
1976–1983	11
1965–1972	10
Total	42

Preceded by 1965–1972	List of people executed in the United States, 1976–1983	Succeeded by 1984
