= Execution of Charles Brooks Jr. =

American murderer executed by lethal injection

Charles Brooks Jr.
- Charles Brooks Jr. at Tarrant County Jail
- Born: September 1, 1942; Fort Worth, Texas, U.S.
- Died: December 7, 1982 (aged 40); Huntsville Unit, Texas, U.S.
- Status: Executed by lethal injection
- Convictions: Federal; Illegal possession of weapons Texas; Capital murder

Details
- Victims: David P. Gregory, 26
- Country: United States
- State: Texas
- Date apprehended: December 14, 1976

The execution of Charles Brooks Jr. (September 1, 1942 – December 7, 1982), also known as Shareef Ahmad Abdul-Rahim, was carried out on December 7, 1982, at the Huntsville Unit in Texas. Brooks Jr., then 34, murdered 26-year-old mechanic David Preston Gregory (March 29, 1950 – December 14, 1976) in Fort Worth, Texas. Brooks Jr. was convicted and sentenced to death in 1977. Brooks Jr. was the first person in the United States to be executed using the, then, newly adopted method of lethal injection. He was also the first prisoner executed in Texas since 1964, and the first African-American to be executed in the United States in the post-Gregg era.

== Biography ==
=== Early life ===
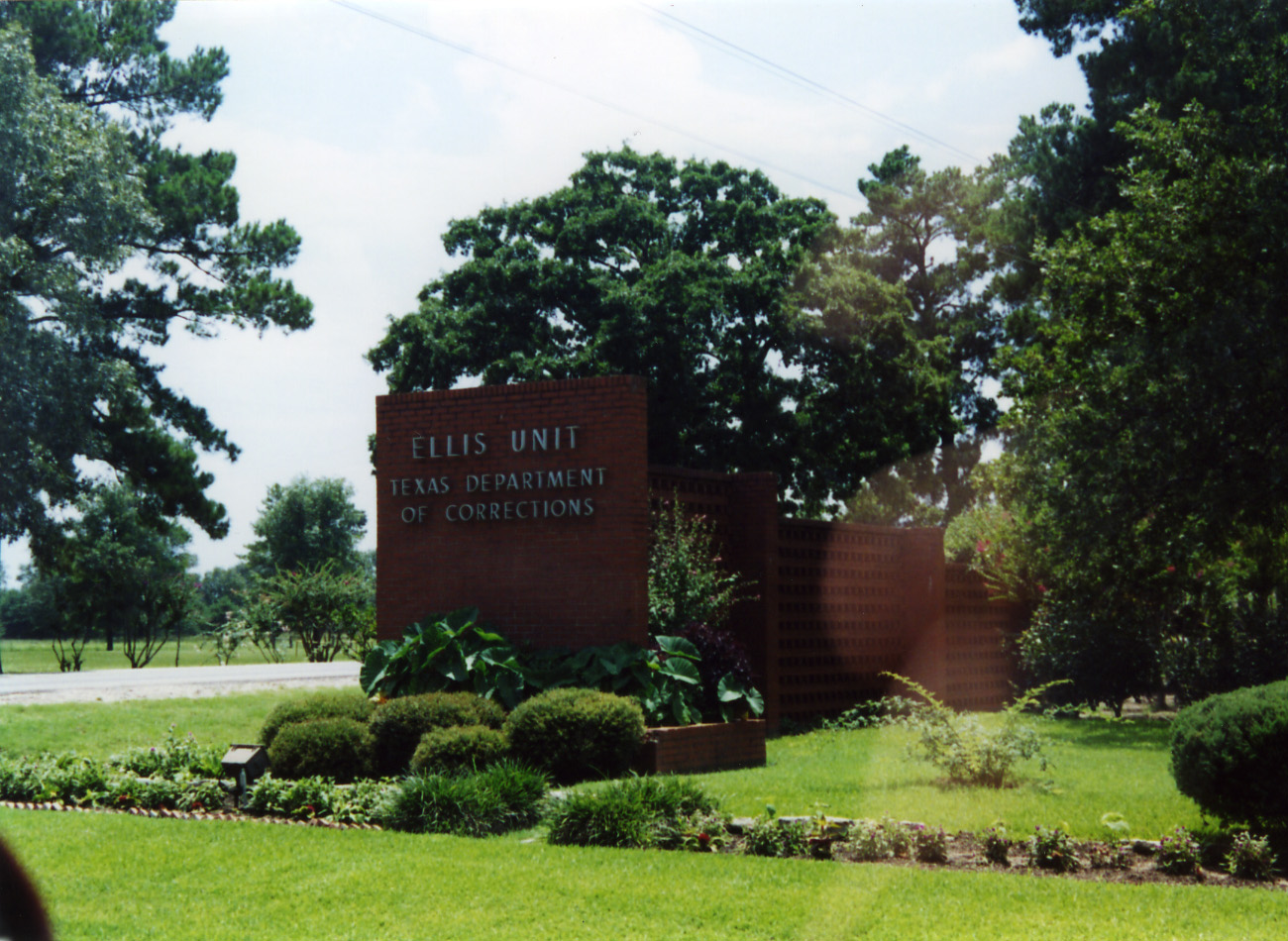
Ellis Unit, where Brooks was held on the men's death row

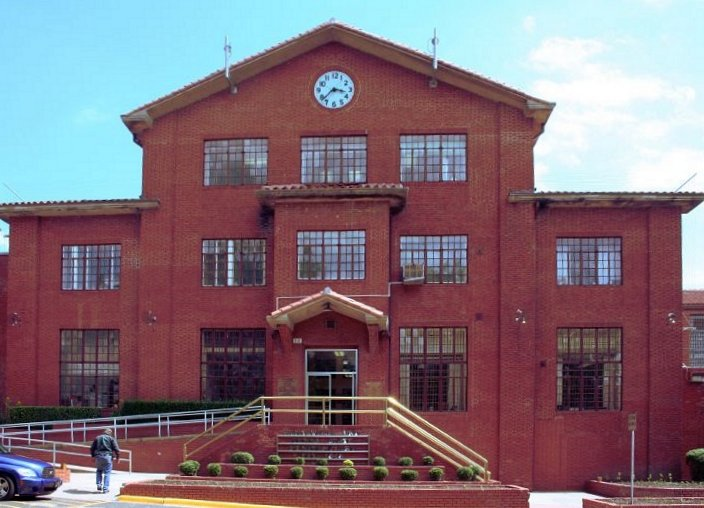
Huntsville Unit, where Brooks was executed

Brooks was raised in a family in Fort Worth, Texas. He attended I.M. Terrell High School, where he played football.

He had served time at the United States Penitentiary, Leavenworth for illegal possession of firearms.

=== Crime and trial ===
On December 14, 1976, Brooks went to a used car lot and asked to test drive a car. The mechanic, David Gregory, accompanied him on the drive. After Brooks picked up his accomplice, Woody Loudres, they put the mechanic in the trunk of the car and Brooks and Loudres drove to a motel. There the mechanic was bound to a chair with coat hangers, gagged with tape and then shot in the head.

Neither Brooks nor Loudres would say who fired the shot and therefore the state sought the death penalty for both men. Brooks received the death sentence on April 25, 1978. Loudres also received the death penalty, but his conviction was overturned on appeal, and he entered a plea bargain in exchange for a 40-year sentence. He was paroled after serving 11 years.

=== Conversion to Islam and execution ===
The Supreme Court of the United States rejected by 6–3 a petition to grant a stay of execution. The State Board of Pardons and Paroles recommended by 2–1 that the execution proceed.

Brooks was held on death row at the Ellis Unit that housed condemned men.

After a last meal consisting of a T-bone steak, french fries, ketchup, Worcestershire sauce, biscuits, peach cobbler and iced tea, Brooks was rolled into the death chamber at the Huntsville Unit in Huntsville, Texas. There he made his final statement. Brooks had converted to Islam while in prison and said a prayer.

Brooks was executed on December 7, 1982, at the age of 40.

== See also ==
- Capital punishment in Texas
- Capital punishment in the United States
- List of people executed in Texas, 1982–1989
- List of people executed in the United States, 1976–1983

Executions carried out by lethal injection
| Preceded by new method | Charles Brooks Jr. December 7, 1982 | Succeeded by James Autry — Texas March 14, 1984 |
Executions carried out in the United States
| Preceded by Frank J. Coppola – Virginia August 10, 1982 | Charles Brooks Jr. – Texas; December 7, 1982 | Succeeded by John Louis Evans – Alabama April 22, 1983 |
