= Jesse Bishop =

American murderer (1933–1979)

- Born: Jesse Walter Bishop; March 1, 1933; Glasgow, Kentucky, U.S.
- Died: October 22, 1979 (aged 46); Nevada State Prison, Nevada, U.S.
- Status: Executed by gas chamber
- Convictions: First degree murder Attempted murder Kidnapping; Assault with a deadly weapon Robbery; Auto theft
- Penalty: Death (February 10, 1978)

Details
- Victims: David Ballard, 22
- Date: December 20, 1977
- Country: United States
- State: Nevada
- Date apprehended: December 22, 1977
- Imprisoned at: Nevada State Prison

Jesse Walter Bishop (March 1, 1933 – October 22, 1979) was an American criminal convicted of the December 1977 murder of David Ballard during a robbery at a Las Vegas Strip casino. Bishop was executed in 1979 by the state of Nevada via gas chamber, becoming the first person to be executed in Nevada since 1961. He was also the first person to be executed in Nevada since the reinstatement of capital punishment, and the first person to be executed in the gas chamber since then. Overall, he was the third person in the U.S. to be executed since the reinstatement, after Gary Gilmore (who died by firing squad) and John Spenkelink (executed in the electric chair). Bishop had spent twenty years of his life incarcerated for various felony offenses and admitted to 18 other murders, all of them gang-related, since 1954.

== Early life ==
Bishop was born on March 1, 1933, in Glasgow, Kentucky. One of four children, Bishop's parents separated when he was 5, resulting in him moving in with his father in East Los Angeles, California. According to Bishop, his father beat him twice a year regardless of whether he had done anything wrong or not. At age 15, Bishop joined a street gang and committed his first armed robbery in Southern California. Two years later, he joined the Air Force as a paratrooper. He served in the Korean War where he sustained injuries and was decorated for his actions.

Bishop developed a drug habit and was caught in possession of heroin, resulting in him being dishonorably discharged. He spent two years at the United States Disciplinary Barracks in Fort Leavenworth, Kansas, before returning to life as a civilian. He then led a life of crime which was mostly full of drug offenses and robberies.

== Murder ==
In 1962, Bishop served time in a California state prison for robbery and spent five years behind bars. He was paroled in 1967 but continued his life of crime, abusing heroin, and committing robberies. In 1970, he returned to prison once again. He successfully escaped from prison in 1972 but was caught shortly afterward and returned. In 1976, he won a parole to Los Angeles, however, according to prison records, he continued to abuse heroin and commit crimes. In 1977, he committed an armed robbery and became a wanted fugitive.

On December 20, 1977, Bishop walked into the El Morocco casino on the Las Vegas Strip in Las Vegas, Nevada. Armed with a .38-caliber revolver, he held up the female cashier and demanded all of the money. Two men witnessed the robbery and attempted to intervene. Employee Larry Thompson, and a casino customer, David Ballard, tried to stop him. Bishop shot Thompson in the stomach and Ballard in the back as he tried to flee. Bishop stole $238 and fled the casino. Thompson survived the shooting, but Ballard, a 22-year-old newlywed Volkswagen mechanic from Baltimore, Maryland, succumbed to his injuries and died in the hospital on December 30. He never regained consciousness following the shooting. He had been married for only three hours before being shot.

== Capture ==
Following the shooting, Bishop fled the casino in a green car, which was found abandoned at the Frontier Hotel the following day. He later robbed a man at the Union Plaza Hotel in downtown Las Vegas a day after the murder and stole his car. Bishop abandoned the stolen car and then stole a pickup truck during his attempt to flee from authorities. He took hostages and got into another car at gunpoint, ordering the owner to drive him around. He then hijacked a U.S. mail truck and took another hostage. Finally, he stole a UPS truck, bringing the number of stolen vehicles to five. He eventually abandoned the UPS truck and made his way on foot.

On December 22, two days after the casino robbery, Bishop was captured following an extensive manhunt. He was captured in Boulder City, Nevada, sleeping beneath a mobile home or camper. The gun used in the murder was found in his possession. Despite claiming he would shoot it out with authorities, Bishop surrendered quietly and was taken into custody before being taken back to Las Vegas to face charges.

== Execution ==
Bishop was first sentenced to death on February 10, 1978, after he admitted to murdering Ballard. From the moment he was sentenced, Bishop said he would not appeal, and even said that he feared his execution would never be carried out. Under Nevada law, the Supreme Court of Nevada must review any death sentence. An automatic appeal was filed against the wishes of Bishop, who tried to fire his attorneys in an attempt to speed up his execution. In 1979, the Supreme Court of Nevada refused to reverse the sentence.

On August 1, 1979, Bishop was sentenced to die in the gas chamber for the murder of Ballard. His execution was originally scheduled for August 27, 1979. However, on August 25, Justice William Rehnquist issued a stay, ordering the state of Nevada to answer a series of questions. The stay was later extended until late September. After the stay was lifted, Bishop was rescheduled for execution on October 22, 1979.

In the early hours of October 22, Bishop was led into the Nevada gas chamber by prison guards. He was strapped into one of the death chairs and the execution via gas inhalation proceeded. Fourteen people witnessed the execution. Bishop was pronounced dead at 12:21 a.m. by prison officials. His last meal was filet mignon, tossed salad with Thousand Island dressing, asparagus, baked potato with sour cream and an unspecified dessert. Bishop was the third person to be executed in the United States since 1976, after Gary Gilmore and John Spenkelink. He was also the first person to be executed in Nevada since 1961. Bishop was the last inmate in Nevada to be executed by the gas chamber. Executions thereafter have been carried out by lethal injection in the same chamber.

Bishop had publicly expressed a lack of remorse for the murder and said he had killed other people. He blamed Ballard for his own death, calling him a "fool" who had gotten "involved in something that was none of his business." In a letter released after his execution, Bishop confessed to 18 other murders, 12 in California and another six around the country. These murders, he said, had all been gangland slayings. Most were contract killings for money and favors, and related to the drug trade. Bishop expressed no remorse for any of these crimes. However, he did privately express remorse over the death of Ballard, whom he described as the only truly innocent person whom he had ever killed. The details were deliberately kept vague in order to protect the accomplices and mobsters who hired him, but Las Vegas detective Chuck Lee said he was certain that Bishop was telling the truth.

== See also ==
- Capital punishment in Nevada
- Capital punishment in the United States
- List of people executed in Nevada
- List of people executed in the United States, 1976–1983

Executions carried out in Nevada
Preceded by Thayne Archibald August 23, 1961	Jesse Bishop; October 22, 1979	Succeeded by Carroll Cole December 6, 1985
Executions carried out in the United States
Preceded by John Spenkelink – Florida May 25, 1979	Jesse Bishop – Nevada; October 22, 1979	Succeeded by Steven Judy – Indiana March 9, 1981
