= Robert W. Williams (murderer) =

American murderer (1952–1983)

Robert Wayne Williams
- Born: February 6, 1952; Baton Rouge, Louisiana, U.S.
- Died: December 14, 1983 (aged 31); Louisiana State Penitentiary, West Feliciana Parish, Louisiana, U.S.
- Cause of death: Execution by electrocution
- Conviction: First degree murder
- Penalty: Death (May 30, 1979)

Details
- Victims: Willie Kelly, 67
- Date: January 5, 1979

Robert Wayne Williams (February 6, 1952 – December 14, 1983) was an American murderer convicted of the January 1979 murder of Willie Kelly, a 67-year-old security guard. He was executed in 1983 by the state of Louisiana by electric chair. He became the first person to be executed in Louisiana since 1976 when the death penalty was reinstated.

== Murder ==
On January 5, 1979, Williams and his accomplice, Ralph Holmes, entered the A & P Supermarket located at 3525 Perkins Road in Baton Rouge, Louisiana. Both men placed ski masks over their faces and Williams pulled out a 12-gauge sawed-off shotgun. They then approached the security guard, 67-year-old Willie Kelly, who was bagging groceries. Holmes tried to remove Kelly's pistol from his holster. As Kelly made a move with his hand toward his pistol, Williams yelled, "Don't try it", and immediately shot Kelly in the face at point-blank range. Williams and Holmes then proceeded to complete the robbery. During this process, Holmes pistol-whipped one of the customers, and Williams accidentally shot two people in their feet. The police received a telephone call from an informant implicating Holmes, Williams, and Williams' wife. Following their arrest, both Williams and his wife gave confessions, implicating themselves in the crime.

== Trial ==
Williams was convicted of first degree murder and was sentenced to death by District Judge Frank Foil on May 30, 1979. The jury recommended that Holmes receive a life term for his role in the crime. Williams consistently maintained that the gun had gone off accidentally and that he had not intended to shoot Kelly. However, he did not testify at his own trial.

Police Chief Howard Kidder later criticized the private security firm for failing to train their security guards properly. He claimed Kelly would not have been killed if he had been trained properly and had been equipped with the correct weapon. Kelly had received no training at all for the security guard position.

== Execution ==
On December 14, 1983, Williams was executed in the electric chair at the Louisiana State Penitentiary. He was pronounced dead at 1:15 a.m. and declined a last meal.

Williams was the first person to be executed in Louisiana in over twenty-two years, since 1961. Since the reinstatement of capital punishment in 1976, Williams was the first person to be executed in Louisiana, and the tenth in the United States. He was also the second black person to be executed in the United States since 1976, as well as the first person to be executed for killing a black victim.

== See also ==
- Capital punishment in Louisiana
- Capital punishment in the United States
- List of people executed in Louisiana
- List of people executed in the United States, 1976–1983
- Race and capital punishment in the United States

Executions carried out in Louisiana
Preceded by Jesse Ferguson June 9, 1961	Robert Wayne Williams; December 14, 1983	Succeeded by Johnny Taylor Jr. February 29, 1984
Executions carried out in the United States
Preceded by Robert Austin Sullivan – Florida November 30, 1983	Robert Wayne Williams – Louisiana; December 14, 1983	Succeeded by John Eldon Smith – Georgia December 15, 1983
