= Robert Austin Sullivan =

American man executed in Florida (1947–1983)

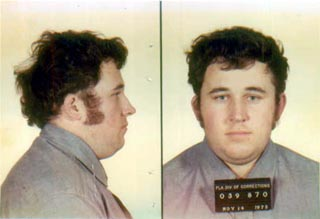
- Born: July 20, 1947; Boston, Massachusetts, U.S.
- Died: November 30, 1983 (aged 36); Florida State Prison, Raiford, Florida, U.S.
- Cause of death: Execution by electrocution
- Conviction: First degree murder
- Penalty: Death (November 12, 1973)

Details
- Victims: Donald Schmidt, 38
- Date: April 8, 1973

Robert Austin Sullivan (July 20, 1947 – November 30, 1983) was an American man who was executed by the state of Florida in the electric chair for the 1973 murder of a Howard Johnson's restaurant manager. He was the second person to be executed in Florida after capital punishment was reinstated in 1976, and at the time of his execution, he had been on death row longer than anyone else in the United States. His execution generated attention when Pope John Paul II personally pleaded for clemency to spare Sullivan's life; however, Governor Bob Graham refused the appeal. Sullivan was executed in 1983 and maintained his innocence to the end.

== Early life ==
Sullivan was born on July 20, 1947, in Boston, Massachusetts. Two weeks after his birth, he was adopted by a couple from Nashua, New Hampshire, and was later raised in Belmont, Massachusetts, by his adoptive mother after the couple divorced.

== Murder ==
On the evening of April 8, 1973, Sullivan and his accomplice, Reid McLaughlin, went to a Howard Johnson's restaurant in Homestead, Florida. Sullivan had previously been employed at the restaurant for eight months as an assistant manager in 1972. At the restaurant, the pair encountered 38-year-old Donald Schmidt, the new assistant manager who worked there. Schmidt was abducted, had his hands tied behind his back with tape, and was then taken by the pair to a remote area in a swamp located in the Everglades. He was forced onto the ground, where he was hit with a tire iron. He was then fatally shot four times in the back of the head by a 12-gauge shotgun. Schmidt was robbed of both his credit cards and a watch.

== Trial ==
On April 17, Sullivan was arrested. Police found evidence linking Sullivan to the crime, including Schmidt's credit cards, his watch, a shotgun, a handgun, tape, and a tire iron, which was discovered in Sullivan's car. Sullivan reportedly confessed to the murder and implicated McLaughlin. McLaughlin also confessed, but agreed to testify against Sullivan in exchange for a life sentence for second degree murder. McLaughlin was paroled on July 28, 1998.

Sullivan later denied committing the crime, claiming he had confessed to it while drunk and that his confession had been coerced. In addition, his lawyer did not contact possible witnesses that could have supported Sullivan's alibi that he was in a gay bar at the time of the murder. Sullivan had reportedly told police that the motive for the crime had been robbery, and that he needed the money to pay a blackmailer who was threatening to tell his father that he was homosexual.

Ultimately, Sullivan was found guilty of the crime and was convicted of first degree murder. He was sentenced to death on November 12, 1973.

== Execution ==
Throughout Sullivan's time on death row, prison officials and Catholic priests described him as a model prisoner. He was originally scheduled to be executed in June 1979, but a federal judge granted him a stay of execution.

On November 30, 1983, Sullivan was executed in the electric chair at Florida State Prison at the age of 36. His last meal consisted of steak, french fries, milk, and fresh strawberries. He was the second person to be executed in Florida since 1976, after John Spenkelink. Prior to his execution, he spent ten years and three months on death row, which, at the time, was the longest amount of time any inmate had spent on death row in the United States.

== See also ==
- Capital punishment in Florida
- Capital punishment in the United States
- List of people executed in Florida
- List of people executed in the United States, 1976–1983

Executions carried out in Florida
Preceded by John Spenkelink May 25, 1979	Robert Austin Sullivan; November 30, 1983	Succeeded by Anthony Antone January 26, 1984
Executions carried out in the United States
Preceded by Jimmy Lee Gray – Mississippi September 2, 1983	Robert Austin Sullivan – Florida; November 30, 1983	Succeeded by Robert Wayne Williams – Louisiana December 14, 1983
