= Richard Kiefer =

American murderer

Richard E. Kiefer (February 26, 1921 – June 15, 1961) was an American murderer and the last person to be executed in Indiana before the national moratorium on executions in 1972 with the case of Furman v. Georgia.

== Crime and surrender ==
In 1957, Kiefer, a Fort Wayne mechanic, murdered his wife, Pearl. He later claimed that he was sick of her criticizing his fishing and drinking habits. He bludgeoned her to death with a hammer before turning that hammer on his five-year-old daughter, Dorothy, when Dorothy approached him to try to break up the fight between her parents. After murdering them, Kiefer hacked their bodies with a knife and then left for Chicago with $3 from his wife's purse and some change from his daughter's piggy bank. Two days later, he returned to Fort Wayne, Indiana, and went to police headquarters to surrender.

== Trial and proceedings ==
Kiefer did not appear to show remorse for the murders of his wife and his daughter. He was charged with both the murders, but only went to trial for his wife's murder. He was convicted in 1958 and sentenced to death. However, in 1958, the conviction was overturned by the Indiana Supreme Court, which noted that at his first trial, the jury was shown photographs of the slashed victims' bodies, and the jury was emotionally fueled by the photos to sentence Kiefer to death. Kiefer was tried a second time, found guilty, and resentenced to death.

== Execution ==
Kiefer's first death warrant decreed that he would be executed on January 31, 1961, but eight hours before that execution took place, the Indiana Supreme Court stayed the execution. His attorney filed an appeal, but the rest of the Supreme Court declined to consider it, and the then-Governor of Indiana, Matthew E. Welsh, signed Kiefer's second death warrant for the execution to take place on June 14, 1961.

On June 15, 1961, at 12:04 AM, Richard Kiefer began the walk, unassisted, to Indiana's electric chair. The warden of the Indiana State Prison in which Kiefer was executed, Warden Ward Lane, described Kiefer as having been emotionless at the execution. The voltage began at 12:11, and Kiefer was pronounced dead at 12:15 after receiving six jolts of electricity. Kiefer was the first person to be executed in Indiana's electric chair since murderer Robert Watts in 1951, and was the last until Steven Judy was executed in 1981.

== See also ==
- List of people executed in the United States in 1961
- List of people executed in Indiana (pre-1972)

Preceded by Robert Watts	Executions carried out in Indiana	Succeeded by Steven Judy
