= Kings Prairie Township, Barry County, Missouri =

Kings Prairie Township
- Township
- Coordinates: 36°52′46″N 093°52′32″W
- Country: United States
- State: Missouri
- County: Barry

Area
  - Total: 28.74 sq mi (74.43 km^{2})
  - Land: 28.73 sq mi (74.41 km^{2})
  - Water: 0.0077 sq mi (0.02 km^{2}) 0.03%
- Elevation: 1,440 ft (439 m)

Population (2000)
  - Total: 968
  - Density: 34/sq mi (13/km^{2})
- FIPS code: 29-38837
- GNIS feature ID: 0766257

Kings Prairie Township is one of twenty-five townships in Barry County, Missouri, United States. As of the 2000 census, its population was 968.

The namesake Kings Prairie was named after George W. King, a pioneer settler.

== Geography ==
Kings Prairie Township covers an area of 28.74 square miles (74.4 km^{2}) and contains no incorporated settlements. It contains two cemeteries: Goodnight and Henderson.
