= John Eldon Smith =

American murderer executed in Georgia (1930–1983)

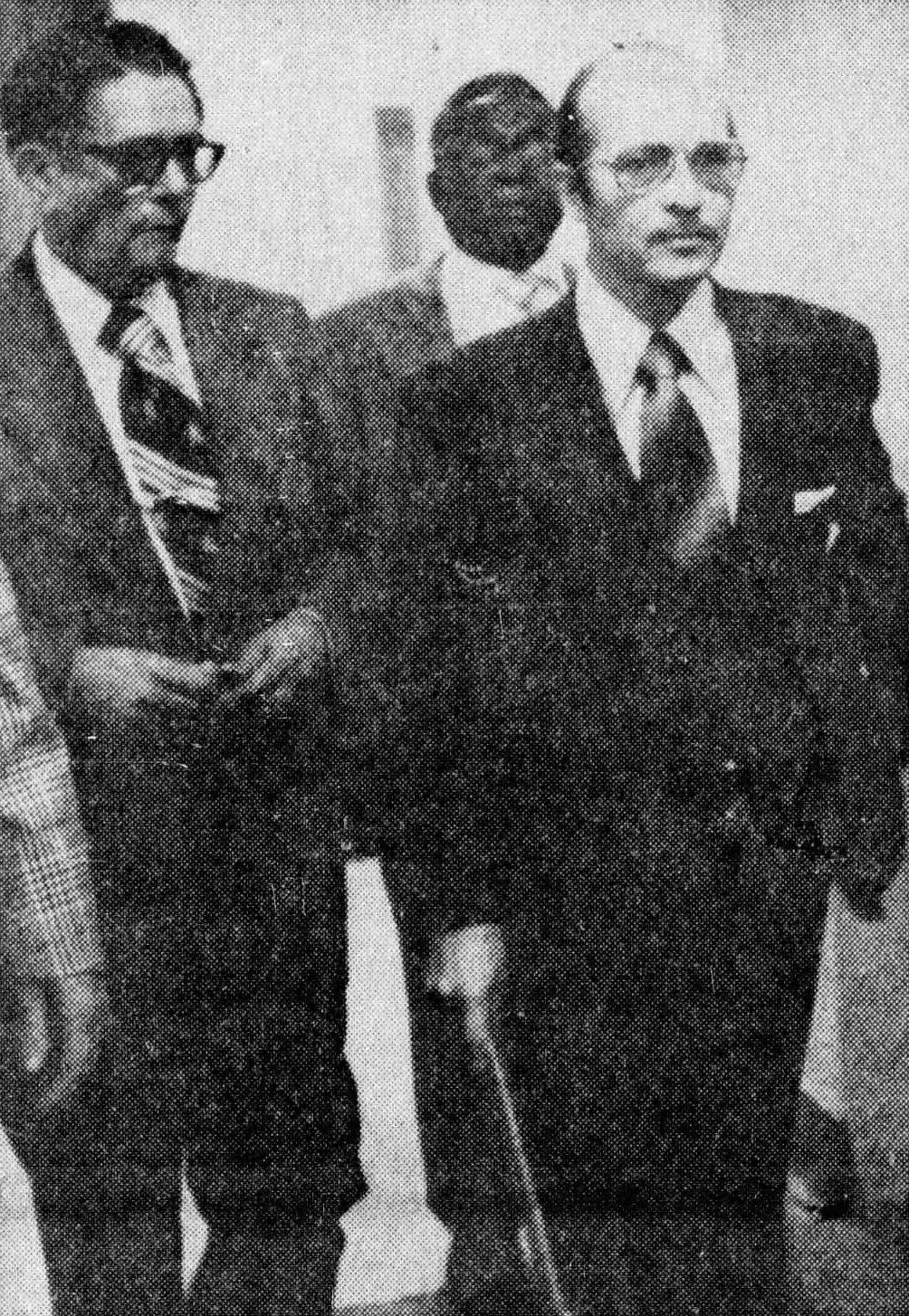
- John Eldon Smith (right), walking alongside Bibb County's Sheriff Bloodsworth after Smith was sentenced to death, January 1975
- Born: September 17, 1930; Altoona, Pennsylvania, U.S.
- Died: December 15, 1983 (aged 53); Georgia Diagnostic and Classification State Prison, Jackson, Georgia, U.S.
- Cause of death: Execution by electrocution
- Other names: Anthony Isalldo Machetti; Tony Machetti
- Conviction: Murder (2 counts)
- Penalty: Death

Details
- Imprisoned at: Georgia State Prison (1974-1980); Georgia Diagnostic and Classification State Prison (1980–1983)

John Eldon Smith (September 17, 1930 – December 15, 1983), who frequently went by the alias Anthony Isalldo Michetti, was an American man who was convicted of the murders of Ronald and Juanita Akins. Smith's wife, Rebecca Turpin, had formerly been married to Akins and stood to gain $53,000 from Akins's life insurance policy if he were to be murdered. Rebecca, Smith, and an associate named John Maree conspired to ambush and murder Akins.

All three were captured, and partly due to his cooperation with authorities, Maree was sentenced to life imprisonment, while Smith and Rebecca were sentenced to death. Rebecca's sentence was later commuted to life imprisonment, while Smith was executed by the state of Georgia via electric chair at the age of 53, thus becoming the first person to be executed in Georgia since 1964, when the death penalty in the United States and after the Gregg v. Georgia case, which reaffirmed the death penalty nationwide.

== Background ==
=== John Eldon Smith ===
Smith was born in Altoona, Pennsylvania, to Zelda and John M. Smith, and grew up in Pennsylvania, working summers on his aunt and uncle's farm. Eventually he became a volunteer firefighter and joined the Insurance Company of North America as a fire-underwriter trainee. He graduated from a high school in Ridley Park, Pennsylvania. Afterwards, he joined the United States Army, where, after four years of service (including serving as a paratrooper) and after being awarded the Good Conduct Medal, he was honorably discharged.

Smith's first marriage, to Catherine Fitzgerald, lasted from 1953 to 1963. They remarried in 1965 and then divorced again in the 1970s. While married, they had one son.

In 1973, after the dissolution of Smith's marriage, he relocated to New Jersey to be the vice president of an insurance agency. An episode of "deep loneliness" led him to take a vacation in 1974 to North Miami Beach, Florida, where he met Rebecca Turpin.

=== Rebecca Turpin ===
In 1956, shortly after graduating from high school, Rebecca Turpin married Joseph Ronald Akins, a technician and an engineer who worked for Southern Natural Gas. They had three daughters together by 1960. In 1973, Akins accused his wife of trying to murder him, once by poison and another time by enlisting in her two eldest daughters' help to suffocate him with a pillow, leading to their divorce by the next year. Akins remarried to Juanita Knight, an elementary schoolteacher.

Subsequent to the divorce, Rebecca relocated to North Miami Beach, Florida, with her daughters, where she met John Eldon Smith, an insurance salesman who was also a native of Miami. The two of them married on July 1, 1974. Subsequently, Smith adopted the moniker 'Anthony Isalldo Machetti' (sometimes shortened to Tony Machetti) and offered multiple explanations for the name change, including that his wife liked that the name had a 'mafia' ring to it, that the name sounded similar to a machete one might use to navigate Florida's swamps, and that the name would be more memorable for clients if he were to start an insurance-selling business. Rebecca changed her own name to Rebecca Akins Smith Machetti. Smith and his wife Rebecca had aspirations of living a life of luxury in North Miami Beach, with Smith adopting an identity as a hitman to fund the lifestyle.

When Rebecca realized that her daughters were the beneficiaries to Ronald Akins's life insurance policy, she decided to murder him in order to cash in on it. Rebecca stood to gain $53,000 from Akins's murder.

== Murder and trial ==
On the evening of August 31, 1974, Smith, alongside his wife Rebecca and one of Rebecca's former lovers, another former insurance salesman and a Fort Myers native named John Maree, lured 38-year-old Joseph Ronald Akins to a suburban subdivision under construction in Bibb County, Georgia, in Macon, under the guise of installing a television antenna. Juanita, who was 29 and had only been married to Akins for twenty days, accompanied him. Upon the victims' arrival, Smith and Maree ambushed them while wielding a shotgun and shot Ronald twice and Juanita once while the victims were still in the car, killing them. During the murders, Rebecca remained in Miami and did not accompany Smith and Maree to Macon. The bodies were discovered only hours later by a private pilot who happened to have been flying over the area.

After committing the murders, Smith and Maree returned to North Miami Beach. Maree was promised $1,000 for his involvement in the murder. Shortly afterwards, police suspected that Rebecca was involved in the murders. Rebecca, Smith, and Maree were all arrested in October 1974. All three were extradited to Georgia.

During John Smith's trial, John Maree took the witness stand for the prosecution and testified that he witnessed Smith commit the murders after driving Smith from Miami to Macon. He also testified that the original plan was to beat Ronald Akins and then inject him with poison, but the plan was thwarted by Juanita accompanying her husband, and by the fact that the beating that Maree and Smith had planned failed to render the victims unconscious, leading to the killers resorting to shooting Ronald and Juanita Akins with buckshot from a 12-gauge shotgun. Maree claimed that Rebecca Machetti convinced him and Smith to participate in the murders by telling them that she wanted "vengeance" against Ronald Akins for issues during her marriage to Akins, and Maree also claimed that both Smith and Rebecca threatened him and his family should he refuse to assist with the murders. Smith also took the stand during his trial, testifying in his own defense and denying any knowledge or involvement in the murders. His alibi was that he spent the day of the murders on a beach near his house in Miami, and he claimed that he had loaned Maree his driver's license and credit cards under the supposed guise of Maree going on a business trip with them.

John Eldon Smith was convicted by an all-male jury on two counts of murder after a three-day trial. During the guilt phase of the trial, the jury only deliberated for 25 minutes before determining that Smith was guilty of the murders of Ronald and Juanita Akins. During the sentencing phase of Smith's trial, his jury deliberated for only 90 minutes before agreeing to sentence Smith to death. Rebecca went on trial on February 10, 1975, and received a death sentence from her jury as well. Maree agreed to testify against Smith and Rebecca in exchange for a guilty plea to two counts of first-degree murder, after which he received two concurrent life sentences that came with the possibility of parole. Maree entered his guilty plea in on April 4, 1975.

== Death row and appeals ==
Smith's death sentence was automatically appealed. At the time of Smith's death sentence, it was customary for an automatic appeal to be filed in every new death row inmate's case, thereby delaying the imposition of death sentences until the appeals process is finished or inmates waive their remaining appeals. In 1976, the Georgia Supreme Court upheld Smith's death sentence.

While Smith was on death row, Rebecca's attorneys appealed her death sentence on the grounds that women were underrepresented in her jury pool. While Smith's jury was picked from the same pool as Rebecca's jury, he did not appeal on those grounds, as his attorneys were unaware of a recent Supreme Court decision that found that the under-representation of women in a jury pool was a violation of the Sixth Amendment to the United States Constitution. Rebecca won a retrial on those grounds, which took place after a change of venue to Gwinnett County, Georgia, and was eventually re-sentenced to life imprisonment. Shortly afterwards, Smith's death sentence was upheld as the same federal court that overturned Rebecca's sentence refused to grant Smith a new trial.

Smith was the first person on Georgia's death row to have an execution date scheduled following the death penalty moratorium that was established with the U.S. Supreme Court's 1972 Furman v. Georgia ruling and lifted by their 1976 Gregg v. Georgia ruling. Because of this distinction, Smith's case garnered significant amounts of press and notoriety. In October 1976, after Smith won a stay of execution, Atlanta's then-mayor, Maynard Jackson, protested the execution. At the time, Jackson was a member of a group called the Georgia Committee Against the Death Penalty, and he and other members of the group called for then-Governor George Busbee to halt all executions during his term of office. When referencing the return of the death penalty nationwide, Jackson stated, "This backward step cannot be tolerated. The death penalty historically has been applied selectively, with primarily the oppressed and the disadvantaged poor people, black and white, uneducated people bearing the brunt of this brutal, barbaric punishment." Jackson was joined by then-State Representative David Scott, the executive director of the Georgia branch of the American Civil Liberties Union Gene Guerrero, and the executive director of the Atlanta branch of the NAACP, Jondell Johnson, in calling for a 90-day stay for John Smith. No executions were carried out during Busbee's term.

== Execution and aftermath ==
In the weeks leading up to Smith's execution, 29 family members, friends, and associates, including Smith's parents, son, and ex-wife Catherine Fitzgerald, wrote letters to Georgia's Pardon and Paroles Board asking that the board spare Smith's life, with letters attesting to Smith's character, accusing his jury and Georgia officials of anti-northerner bias, and casting doubt on Smith's level of culpability in Ronald and Juanita Akins's murders, with some accusing Rebecca of bearing most responsibility for the murders or accusing Maree of lying in his testimony implicating Smith. The day prior to Smith's execution, the parole board denied his request for clemency. Smith was also scheduled to be executed alongside Alpha Otis O'Daniel Stephens, another Georgia death row inmate, but the U.S. Supreme Court granted Stephens a last-minute stay of execution by a 5–4 vote, while Smith, who had exhausted all of his court appeals by then, had his request denied by a 7–2 vote. Parole Board Chairman Mobley Howell said of Smith's case, "There can be no doubt John Eldon Smith was a willing and active participant in the crime of murder."

Smith's execution was scheduled to take place on December 15, 1983, at 8:00 a.m., which, according to a former prison guard who was staffed to work at Smith's execution, attracted many anti-death penalty protests and Atlanta-based television stations. Smith was executed by electric chair at the Georgia Diagnostic and Classification State Prison in Jackson, Georgia, thereby becoming the first person to be executed in Georgia since the electrocution of Bernard Dye on October 16, 1964, which occurred prior to the de facto death penalty moratorium established in the mid-1960s. The prison announced that Smith's time of death occurred at approximately 8:15 a.m.

Years after his execution, his final words would be purported to have been, "Well, the Lord is going to get another one." In reality, contemporaneous sources state that Smith had no official final words delivered in the execution chamber and did not request any specific witnesses to attend his execution, although reporters noted that he told the warden shortly before his execution, "My final statement will be delivered by Father Wise" (referring to then-prison chaplain Reverend Richard Wise) and that he also told guards as they were strapping him into the electric chair, "Hey, there ain't no point in pulling it so tight." During a press conference that took place an hour after the execution, Father Wise said Smith had told him, "Well, the Lord's going to get another one" earlier on the morning of his execution; however, at the same press conference, Father Wise also read Smith's actual final statement, which the two prepared prior to the execution and which consisted of passages from 2 Corinthians. He also reported that Smith had been calm and resigned to his fate that morning.

Following Smith's execution, anti-death penalty activist Henry Schwarzschild noted that John Smith's execution ushered in a new era of executions in the United States, in which the death penalty would be carried out even more frequently than in the 1950s and 1960s: "We have entered a new period where executions are utterly likely."

An ecumenical Christian organization called Jubilee Partners handled Smith's funeral, and he was buried on their property near Comer, Georgia, with Father Wise officiating at the ceremony.

John Maree was paroled from prison after serving 13 years of his sentence. In 2010, at the age of 71, Rebecca Machetti was paroled 36 years into her sentence and changed her surname to Lorusso to match that of her new common-law husband at the time. In September 2020, at the age of 81, she died of complications related to COVID-19.

== See also ==
- Capital punishment in Georgia (U.S. state)
- Capital punishment in the United States
- List of people executed in Georgia (U.S. state)
- List of people executed in the United States, 1976–1983

Executions carried out in Georgia
| Preceded by Bernard Dye October 16, 1964 | John Eldon Smith; December 15, 1983 | Succeeded by Ivon Stanley July 12, 1984 |
Executions carried out in the United States
| Preceded by Robert Wayne Williams – Louisiana December 14, 1983 | John Eldon Smith – Georgia; December 15, 1983 | Succeeded by Anthony Antone – Florida January 26, 1984 |
