= John Spenkelink =

American murderer (1949–1979)

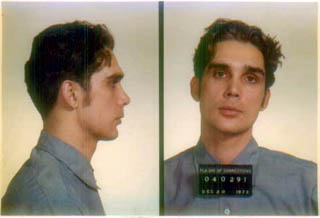
- Spenkelink's Florida Department of Corrections mug shot
- Born: John Arthur Spenkelink; March 29, 1949; Le Mars, Iowa, U.S.
- Died: May 25, 1979 (aged 30); Florida State Prison, Raiford, Florida, U.S.
- Spouse: Virginia K. Richards (m. 1967)
- Status: Executed by electrocution
- Convictions: California; Robbery; Florida; First-degree murder (self-defense rejected)
- Penalty: California; 5 years to life Florida; Death

John Arthur Spenkelink (March 29, 1949 – May 25, 1979) was an American convicted murderer. He was executed in 1979, the first convicted criminal to be executed in Florida after capital punishment was reinstated in 1976, and the second (after Gary Gilmore) in the United States as well as the first involuntarily executed in about 14 years.

== Background ==
At 12 years old, Spenkelink discovered the body of his alcoholic farmer father, who had died by suicide in his truck by carbon monoxide poisoning. He was arrested several times in his youth and was in and out of various jails and reform schools. He also married at 18.

Spenkelink escaped from a California prison in 1972, where he was serving a five-years-to-life sentence for armed robbery of a fast food restaurant, five gas stations, and two people. On February 4, 1973, 24-year-old Spenkelink picked up hitchhiker Joseph E. Szymankiewicz and checked into a hotel in Tallahassee, Florida. The two had been on an apparent robbery spree. Following a heated argument, Spenkelink left the hotel room and upon his return shot Szymankiewicz in the back and beat him with a hatchet.

Less than a week later, on February 9, Spenkelink was arrested on suspicion of armed robbery in Buena Park, California, and the murder weapon was found in an apartment of one of Spenkelink's associates.

Spenkelink claimed he had acted in self-defense—that Szymankiewicz had stolen his money, forced him to play Russian roulette, and sexually assaulted him.

After he was charged, Spenkelink turned down a plea bargain to second-degree murder that would have resulted in a life sentence. In 1973, he was convicted of first-degree murder and sentenced to death. Frank Brumm was also tried as a co-defendant for the murder but was acquitted after Spenkelink testified that he had acted in self-defense and that Brumm had no involvement in Szymankiewicz's death.

After his acquittal, Brumm, who could no longer be retried due to protections against double jeopardy, confessed to his involvement in Szymankiewicz's murder. He also rejected Spenkelink's claim that Szymankiewicz had been killed in self-defense. Brumm said Spenkelink had offered him $1,000 to "get rid of" a friend, and that he and Spenkelink both shot Syzmankiewicz and beat him with the hatchet. After Szymankiewicz was dead, Brumm said he and Spenkelink finished a bottle of gin over the body.

== Execution ==
In the 1972 court case Furman v. Georgia, the U.S. Supreme Court struck down death penalty schemes in all states, ruling that it had been applied unfairly. Florida and other states rushed to rewrite less-arbitrary laws.

Spenkelink appealed his sentence, but in 1977, Governor Reubin Askew of Florida signed Spenkelink's first death warrant. In 1979 Askew's successor, Governor Bob Graham, signed a second death warrant. Spenkelink continued to appeal, earning stays from both the U.S Court of Appeals and the U.S. Supreme Court, but both stays were overturned, meaning that Spenkelink would be the first man put to death involuntarily (Gilmore had insisted he wanted to die) since executions were resumed in the U.S. in 1977.

Spenkelink's case became a national cause célèbre, encompassing both the broader debate over the morality of the death penalty and the narrower question of whether capital punishment fit Spenkelink's crime. His cause was taken up by former Florida Governor LeRoy Collins, actor Alan Alda, and singer Joan Baez, among many others. Also at issue was whether capital punishment discriminated against the poor and underprivileged—Spenkelink often signed his prison correspondence with the epigram, "capital punishment means those without capital get the punishment."

The execution was finally carried out on May 25, 1979, in "Old Sparky", the Florida State Prison electric chair. That morning, Doug Tracht, a popular Jacksonville disc jockey known as "The Greaseman," aired a recording of sizzling bacon on his radio program and dedicated it to Spenkelink.

Another death row inmate, Willie Darden, was supposed to be executed on the same day as Spenkelink, but won a stay of execution. Darden was eventually executed in 1988.

== Aftermath ==
=== Abuse allegations ===
Shortly after Spenkelink's execution and burial at Rose Hills Memorial Park, another Florida death row inmate alleged that prison officials had manhandled and assaulted Spenkelink during preparation for his execution. Several decisions lent credence to these allegations: corrections officials had obscured the death chamber's viewing window while Spenkelink was strapped to the electric chair, citing anonymity concerns; the county did not perform an autopsy on Spenkelink (in violation of state law) because the county coroner considered it a redundant and prohibitively expensive policy; and the prison superintendent had limited visits from family and clergy on Spenkelink's execution day, citing fear of a suicide attempt.

Governor Graham commissioned an investigation, which in September 1979 concluded that Spenkelink had been "taunted" and had loud exchanges with prison guards and staff immediately before his execution, but had not been physically abused. Florida corrections officials responded by allowing witnesses to see the complete execution process going forward. Florida's counties now perform autopsies on all executed inmates.

=== Murder allegations ===
In spite of the state's investigation, a rumor began that Spenkelink had been murdered prior to his being brought into the death chamber. The rumor reached Spenkelink's mother Lois, who, after encouragement from a spiritual advisor, paid to have her son's body exhumed for a post-mortem examination. On March 6, 1981, Los Angeles County Coroner Thomas Noguchi announced his finding that the cause of Spenkelink's death was indeed electrocution.

== See also ==
- Capital punishment in Florida
- Capital punishment in the United States
- List of people executed in Florida
- List of people executed in the United States, 1976–1983

Executions carried out in Florida
Preceded by Sie Dawson May 12, 1964	John Spenkelink; May 25, 1979	Succeeded by Robert Austin Sullivan November 30, 1983
Executions carried out in the United States
Preceded by Gary Gilmore – Utah January 17, 1977	John Spenkelink – Florida; May 25, 1979	Succeeded by Jesse Bishop – Nevada October 22, 1979
