= Ronald Clark O'Bryan =

American murderer (1944–1984)

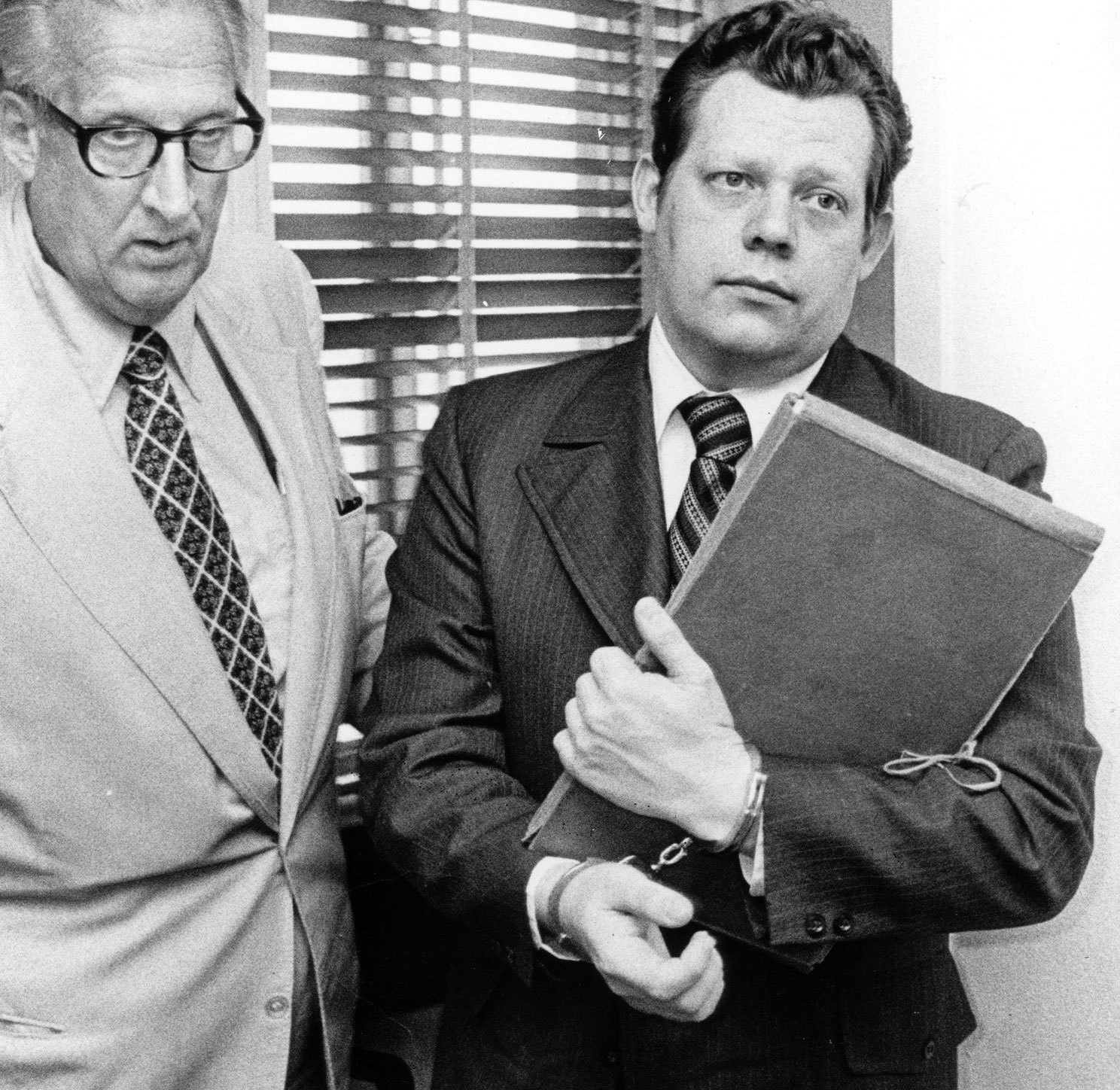
- O'Bryan (right) being escorted from the courtroom after being found guilty of murdering his son, on June 3, 1975
- Born: October 19, 1944; Houston, Texas, U.S.
- Died: March 31, 1984 (aged 39); Huntsville Unit, Texas, U.S.
- Resting place: Forest Park East Cemetery
- Other names: The Candy Man; The Man Who Killed Halloween; The Pixy Stix Killer; The Poisoned Candy Killer
- Occupation: Optician
- Spouse: Daynene O'Bryan (div. 1975)
- Children: 2
- Status: Executed by lethal injection
- Motive: Life insurance money
- Convictions: Capital murder Attempted murder (4 counts)
- Penalty: Death

Details
- Victims: Timothy O'Bryan, 8
- Date: October 31, 1974
- Country: United States
- Location: Deer Park, Texas
- Weapon: Potassium cyanide
- Date apprehended: November 5, 1974
- Imprisoned at: Ellis Unit

Ronald Clark O'Bryan (October 19, 1944 – March 31, 1984), nicknamed The Candy Man, The Man Who Killed Halloween, The Pixy Stix Killer and The Poisoned Candy Killer, was an American man convicted of killing his eight-year-old son Timothy (April 5, 1966 – October 31, 1974) on Halloween 1974 with a potassium cyanide-laced Pixy Stix that was ostensibly collected during a trick or treat outing. O'Bryan poisoned his son in order to claim life insurance money to ease his own financial troubles, as he was $100,000 in debt. O'Bryan also distributed poisoned candy to his daughter and three other children in an attempt to cover up his crime; however, neither his daughter nor the other children ate the poisoned candy. He was convicted of capital murder in June 1975 and sentenced to death. He was executed by lethal injection in March 1984.

== Background ==
O'Bryan lived with his wife, Daynene, in Deer Park, Texas, with their son Timothy and daughter Elizabeth (born 1969). O'Bryan worked as an optician at Texas State Optical in Sharpstown, Houston. He was a deacon at the Second Baptist Church, where he sang in the choir and ran a local bus program.

== Death of Timothy O'Bryan ==
On October 31, 1974, O'Bryan took his two children trick-or-treating in a Pasadena, Texas neighborhood. O'Bryan's neighbor and his two children accompanied them. After visiting a home where the occupant failed to answer the door, the children grew impatient and ran ahead to the next home while O'Bryan stayed behind. He eventually caught up with the group and produced five 21-inch (530 mm) Pixy Stix, which he would later claim he was given from the occupant of the house that had not answered the door. At the end of the evening, O'Bryan gave each of his neighbor's two children a Pixy Stix and one each to Timothy and Elizabeth. Upon returning home, O'Bryan gave the fifth Pixy Stix to a 10-year-old boy whom he recognized from his church.

Before bed, Timothy asked to eat some of the candy he collected, and according to O'Bryan, he chose the Pixy Stix. Timothy had trouble getting the powdered candy out of the straw so O'Bryan helped him loosen the powder. After tasting the candy, Timothy complained that it tasted bitter. O'Bryan then gave his son Kool-Aid to wash the taste away. Timothy immediately began to complain that his stomach hurt and ran to the bathroom where he began vomiting and convulsing. O'Bryan later claimed he held Timothy while he was vomiting and the child went limp in his arms. Timothy O'Bryan died en route to the hospital less than an hour after consuming the candy.

Timothy's death from poisoned Halloween candy raised fear in the community. Numerous parents in Deer Park and the surrounding area turned in candy their children got from trick or treating to the police, fearing it was laced with poison. The police did not initially suspect O'Bryan of any wrongdoing until Timothy's autopsy revealed that the Pixy Stix he had consumed was laced with a fatal dose of potassium cyanide. Four of the five Pixy Stix O'Bryan claimed to have received were recovered by authorities from the other children, none of whom had consumed the candy. The parents of the fifth child became hysterical when they could not locate the candy after being notified by the police. The parents rushed upstairs to find their son asleep, holding the unconsumed candy. The boy had been unable to open the staples that sealed the wrapper shut. All five of the Pixy Stix had been opened, with the top two inches (51 mm) refilled with cyanide powder and resealed with a staple. According to a pathologist who tested the Pixy Stix, the candy consumed by Timothy contained enough cyanide to kill two adults, while the other four candies contained enough to kill three to four adults.

O'Bryan initially told police that he could not remember which house he got the Pixy Stix from. Police became suspicious because O'Bryan and his neighbor had only taken their children to homes on two streets because it had been raining. Their suspicions increased after learning that none of the homes they visited had given out Pixy Stix. After walking the neighborhood with police three times, O'Bryan led them to the home where no one had answered the door. O'Bryan claimed that he went back there before catching up with the group. He said the owner of the home did not turn the lights on, but did crack the door open and hand him five Pixy Stix. He claimed to have only seen the man's arm, which he described as "hairy". The home was owned by a man named Courtney Melvin. Melvin was an air traffic controller at William P. Hobby Airport and did not get home from work until 11 p.m. on Halloween night. Police ruled Melvin out as a suspect when over 200 people confirmed that he had been at work.

As their investigation progressed, police learned that Ronald O'Bryan was over US$100,000 (equivalent to about $650,000 in 2025) in debt and had a history of being unable to hold a job. In the ten years preceding the crime, O'Bryan had held 21 jobs. At the time of his arrest, he was suspected of theft at his job at Texas State Optical and was close to being fired. His car was about to be repossessed, he had defaulted on several bank loans, and the family home had been foreclosed on. Police discovered that O'Bryan had taken out life insurance policies on his children in the months preceding Timothy's death. In January 1974, he had taken out $10,000 (equivalent to $65,283 in 2025) life insurance policies on both of his children. One month before Timothy's death, O'Bryan took out additional $20,000 (equivalent to about $130,600 in 2025) policies on both children, despite the objections of his life insurance agency. In the days preceding Timothy's death, O'Bryan had taken out yet another $20,000 policy on each child. The various policies totaled approximately $100,000 (equivalent to about $652,800 in 2025). O'Bryan's wife maintained that she did not know about the insurance policies on her children's lives. Police also learned that on the morning after Timothy's death, O'Bryan had called his insurance company to inquire about collecting the policies he had taken out on his son.

After learning that O'Bryan had visited a chemical supply store in Houston to buy cyanide shortly before Halloween 1974 (he left without purchasing anything after learning the smallest amount available to purchase was five pounds), police began to suspect that Ronald O'Bryan had laced the candies with poison in an effort to kill his children to collect on their life insurance policies. They believed he gave the other children poisoned candy in an effort to cover up his crime. Police repeatedly questioned O'Bryan but he maintained his innocence.

== Trial and conviction ==
Ronald Clark O'Bryan after entering death row

Although police never discovered when or where O'Bryan bought the poison, he was arrested for Timothy's murder on November 5, 1974. He was indicted on one count of capital murder and four counts of attempted murder. O'Bryan entered a plea of not guilty to all five counts. O'Bryan's trial began in Houston on May 5, 1975. During the trial, a chemist who was acquainted with O'Bryan testified that in summer 1973, O'Bryan contacted him asking about cyanide and how much would be fatal. A chemical supply salesman also testified that O'Bryan had asked him how to purchase cyanide. Friends and co-workers testified that in the months before Timothy's death, O'Bryan showed an "unusual interest" in cyanide and spoke about how much it would take to kill a person. O'Bryan's sister-in-law and brother-in-law testified that on the day of Timothy's funeral, he spoke of using the money from Timothy's insurance policy to take a long vacation and buy other items. Additionally, his wife rejected the claim that Timothy chose the Pixy Stix, stating that O'Bryan had, in fact, forced him to choose the Stix. O'Bryan continued to maintain his innocence. His defense mainly drew upon the decades-old urban legend concerning a "mad poisoner" who hands out Halloween candy laced with poison or needles or candy apples with razor blades inserted. These stories have persisted despite the fact that there are no documented instances of strangers poisoning Halloween candy.

The case and subsequent trial garnered national attention and the press dubbed O'Bryan "The Candyman".

On June 3, 1975, a jury took 46 minutes to find O'Bryan guilty of capital murder and four counts of attempted murder. The jury took 71 minutes to sentence him to death by lethal injection. Shortly after he was convicted, his wife filed for divorce. She later remarried and her new husband adopted her daughter Elizabeth.

== Execution ==
At the time, men sentenced to death under Texas law were confined to the Ellis I Unit near Huntsville, Texas. According to Reverend Carroll Pickett, a former chaplain who worked for the Texas Department of Criminal Justice, O'Bryan was shunned and despised by his fellow death row inmates for killing his child and was "absolutely friendless". The inmates reportedly petitioned to hold an organized demonstration on O'Bryan's execution date to express their hatred of him.

O'Bryan's first execution date was set for August 8, 1980. His attorney successfully petitioned for a stay of execution. A second date was scheduled for May 25, 1982. That date was also postponed. Judge Michael McSpadden scheduled a third execution date for October 31, 1982, the eighth anniversary of the crime, and he offered to personally drive O'Bryan to the death chamber. It was to have been the first time Texas executed an inmate by lethal injection, although this would become Charles Brooks Jr.. The Supreme Court delayed the date yet again to give O'Bryan a chance to pursue an appeal to seek a new trial. A fourth date was scheduled for March 31, 1984. O'Bryan's lawyer sought a fourth stay on the basis that lethal injection was a "cruel and unusual punishment". On March 28, a federal judge rejected the request. On March 31, 1984, shortly after midnight, O'Bryan was executed by lethal injection at the Huntsville Unit. His last meal consisted of T-bone steak, French fries and ketchup, whole kernel corn, sweet peas, lettuce and tomato salad with egg and French dressing, iced tea, sweetener, saltines, Boston cream pie, and rolls.

O'Bryan's last words were, "What is about to transpire in a few moments is wrong! However, we as human beings do make mistakes and errors. This execution is one of those wrongs yet doesn't mean our whole system of justice is wrong. Therefore, I would forgive all who have taken part in any way in my death. Also, to anyone I have offended in any way during my 39 years, I pray and ask your forgiveness, just as I forgive anyone who offended me in any way. And I pray and ask God's forgiveness for all of us respectively as human beings. To my loved ones, I extend my undying love. To those close to me, know in your hearts I love you one and all. God bless you all and may God's best blessings be always yours. Ronald C. O'Bryan P.S. During my time here, I have been treated well by all T.D.C. personnel." During the execution, a crowd of 300 demonstrators gathered outside the prison cheered while some yelled, "Trick or treat!" Others showered anti-death penalty demonstrators with candy.

Ronald O'Bryan is buried in Forest Park East Cemetery in Webster, Texas. Timothy is buried in Forest Park Lawndale Cemetery in Houston.

== See also ==
- List of people executed in Texas, 1982–1989
- List of people executed in the United States in 1984
- Poisoned candy myths

Executions carried out in Texas
Preceded by James Autry March 14, 1984	Ronald Clark O'Bryan; March 31, 1984	Succeeded by Thomas Barefoot October 30, 1984
Executions carried out in the United States
Preceded by James W. Hutchins – North Carolina March 16, 1984	Ronald Clark O'Bryan – Texas; March 31, 1984	Succeeded by Elmo Patrick Sonnier – Louisiana April 5, 1984
