= Velma Barfield =

American serial killer (1932–1984)

- NCDAC mugshot, c. 1984
- Born: Margie Velma Bullard; October 29, 1932; Eastover, North Carolina, U.S.
- Died: November 2, 1984 (aged 52); Central Prison, North Carolina, U.S.
- Status: Executed by lethal injection
- Convictions: First degree murder Writing bad checks (7 counts)
- Penalty: Death (December 1978)

Details
- Victims: 7
- Span of crimes: April 4, 1969 – February 4, 1978
- Country: United States
- State: North Carolina
- Date apprehended: May 13, 1978

Margie Velma Barfield (née Bullard; October 29, 1932 – November 2, 1984) was an American serial killer who was convicted of one murder but was linked to seven murders in total. She became the first woman in the United States to be executed after the resumption of capital punishment in 1976, and the first since 1962. She was also the first woman to be executed by lethal injection.

== Life and murders ==
Velma Barfield was born Margie Velma Bullard on October 29, 1932, in Eastover, North Carolina, but was raised near Fayetteville. Her father was reportedly physically abusive and her mother did not intervene. Velma escaped her tumultuous household by marrying Thomas Burke in 1949. The couple had two children and were reportedly happy until Velma had a hysterectomy and developed back pain. These events led to a behavioral change in Velma and an eventual addiction to prescription drugs.

Thomas's escalating alcoholism and Velma's resultant complaints turned into bitter arguments. On April 4, 1969, after Thomas had passed out, Velma and their children left the house; when they returned, they found the house burned and Thomas dead. In 1970, Velma Bullard married a widower, Jennings Barfield, but the union lasted less than a year, as Jennings died of heart complications on March 22, 1971.

In 1974, Lillian Bullard, Velma's mother, showed symptoms of intense diarrhea, vomiting and nausea, only to fully recover a few days later. Later that year, during a Christmas visit, Bullard fell ill again with the same symptoms but died after being hospitalized on December 30. The following year, Barfield was convicted of seven counts of writing bad checks and sentenced to six months in prison, but was released after serving three months.

In 1976, Barfield began caring for the elderly, working for Montgomery and Dollie Edwards in Lumberton. Montgomery fell ill and died on January 29, 1977. Just over a month later, Dollie experienced symptoms identical to those of Bullard and died on March 1. Barfield later confessed to Dollie's murder. The following year, Barfield took another caretaker job, this time for 76-year-old Record Lee, who had broken her leg. On June 4, 1977, Lee's husband, John Henry, died after he had begun experiencing wracking pains in his stomach and chest along with vomiting and diarrhea. Barfield later confessed to his murder.

Another victim was Rowland Stuart Taylor, Barfield's boyfriend and a relative of Dollie Edwards. Fearing he had discovered that she had been forging checks on his account, Barfield mixed an arsenic-based rat poison into his beer and tea. Taylor died on February 3, 1978, while Barfield was "trying to nurse him back to health"; an autopsy found arsenic in Taylor's system. After her arrest, Jennings' body was exhumed and found to have traces of arsenic, a murder that Barfield denied having committed. Although she subsequently confessed to the murders of Bullard, Dollie, and John Henry Lee, she was tried and convicted only for the murder of Taylor.

== Imprisonment and execution ==
Barfield was imprisoned at Central Prison in Raleigh, North Carolina, in an area for escape-prone and mentally ill prisoners, as there was no designated area for women under death sentences at the time of her incarceration. She was the state's only female death row inmate. A death row unit for female inmates in North Carolina was subsequently established at the North Carolina Correctional Institution for Women.

During her stay on death row, Barfield became a devout Christian. Her last few years were spent ministering to prisoners, for which she received praise from evangelist Billy Graham.

Barfield's involvement in Christian ministry was extensive enough that an effort was made to obtain a commutation to life imprisonment. A second basis for this appeal was the testimony of Dorothy Otnow Lewis, Professor of Psychiatry at New York University School of Medicine and an authority on violent behavior, who claimed that Barfield suffered from dissociative identity disorder. Lewis testified that she had spoken to Barfield's other personality, "Billy," who told her that Velma had been a victim of sexual abuse and that he, Billy, had killed her abusers. The judge was unconvinced. "One of them did it," Lewis quoted him as saying "I don't care which one."

After Barfield's appeal was denied in federal court, she instructed her attorneys to abandon a further appeal to the United States Supreme Court, having accepted her upcoming execution and wanting to "die with dignity." Barfield was executed on November 2, 1984, at Central Prison. She released a statement before the execution: "I know that everybody has gone through a lot of pain, all the families connected, and I am sorry, and I want to thank everybody who have been supporting me all these six years." Barfield chose as her last meal Cheez Doodles and Coca-Cola. She was buried in a small, rural North Carolina cemetery near her first husband, Thomas Burke. Barfield had requested that her organs be used for transplant purposes, but this was not possible since her heart could not be restarted. However, her corneas and some of her skin tissue were donated.

Barfield's execution raised some political controversies when Governor Jim Hunt, who was challenging incumbent Jesse Helms for his U.S. Senate seat, rejected Barfield's request for clemency.

== See also ==
- List of people executed in North Carolina
- List of people executed in the United States in 1984
- List of serial killers in the United States
- List of women executed in the United States since 1976

Executions in North Carolina
Preceded by James W. Hutchins March 16, 1984	Velma Barfield; November 2, 1984	Succeeded by John William Rook September 19, 1986
Executions carried out in the United States
Preceded by Thomas Andy Barefoot – Texas October 30, 1984	Velma Barfield – North Carolina; November 2, 1984	Succeeded by Timothy Charles Palmes – Florida November 8, 1984
Women executed in the United States
Preceded by Elizabeth Ann Duncan – California August 8, 1962	Velma Barfield – North Carolina; November 2, 1984	Succeeded by Karla Faye Tucker – Texas February 3, 1998
