= List of people executed in the United States in 1962 =

Forty-seven people, forty-six male and one female, were executed in the United States in 1962, twenty-nine by electrocution, fifteen by gas chamber, and three by hanging.

The state of Iowa would conduct its final executions before abolishing capital punishment in 1965. New Jersey would carry out its last involuntary execution, with the last overall occurring the following year. Elizabeth Ann Duncan was the last woman executed before the ruling of Furman v. Georgia, and would be the last woman executed in the United States until 1984.

Herbert Bradley became the last person to be executed in the United States for a robbery that did not result in the victim's death. The victim was left permanently crippled from the waist down after being shot six times and beaten with a hammer, but did not die. Rudolph Wright became the last person to be executed in the United States for assault. After murdering a fellow inmate while serving a life sentence, Wright received a life sentence for first degree murder and a mandatory death sentence for assault with a deadly weapon by an inmate serving a life sentence.

Elmo Lee Smith was the last inmate to be executed by the electric chair in the Commonwealth of Pennsylvania. The state would switch to lethal injection in 1990.

== List of people executed in the United States in 1962 ==
No.	Date of execution	Name	Age of person			Gender	Ethnicity	State	Method	Ref.
No.	Date of execution	Name	At execution	At offense	Age difference	Gender	Ethnicity	State	Method	Ref.
1	January 10, 1962	Charles Louis Forgey	23	21	2	Male	White	Texas	Electrocution	
2	January 11, 1962	Rudolph Wright	31	29	2	Male	Black	California	Gas chamber	
3	January 11, 1962	Roosevelt Wiley	29	26	3	Male	Black	Texas	Electrocution	
4	January 17, 1962	Elbert Lyndon Carter	24	23	1	Male	Black	California	Gas chamber	
5	January 29, 1962	Frank McCoy	36	31	5	Male	White	Pennsylvania	Electrocution	
6	March 2, 1962	James Kelley Moss	48	44	4	Male	White	Kentucky	Electrocution	
7	March 2, 1962	Carroll Lewis Garland	26	26	0	Male	Black	Virginia	Electrocution	
8	March 7, 1962	Henry Ray Lane Jr.	24	22	2	Male	White	California	Gas chamber	
9	March 9, 1962	Harold David Wooley	37	35	2	Male	White	Colorado	Gas chamber	
10	March 20, 1962	Donald Ray Wilson	22	20	2	Male	White	Texas	Electrocution	
11	March 23, 1962	Vincent Ciucci	35	27	8	Male	White	Illinois	Electrocution	
12	April 2, 1962	Elmo Lee Smith	41	38	3	Male	White	Pennsylvania	Electrocution	
13	April 18, 1962	Robert Green Hughes	27	25	2	Male	Black	California	Gas chamber	
14	April 19, 1962	Adrian Lee Johnson	19	17	2	Male	Black	Texas	Electrocution	
15	April 20, 1962	Douglas Clee Thorne	27	24	3	Male	White	South Carolina	Electrocution	
16	April 20, 1962	Ray Landy Young	29	26	3	Male	Black	South Carolina	Electrocution	
17	May 11, 1962	Willie Wilson	22	21	1	Male	Black	Mississippi	Gas chamber	
18	May 12, 1962	Robert Lee Jefferson	23	21	2	Male	Black	Florida	Electrocution	
19	May 12, 1962	Johnnie Hill	28	26	2	Male	Black	Florida	Electrocution	
20	May 16, 1962	Herbert Lemuel Bradley Sr.	20	19	1	Male	Black	Texas	Electrocution	
21	May 23, 1962	Howard Bartlett Stickney	24	20	4	Male	White	Texas	Electrocution	
22	May 25, 1962	Walter Joseph Hammill	31	27	4	Male	White	Colorado	Gas chamber	
23	June 1, 1962	Ronald George Fenton	29	27	2	Male	White	Ohio	Electrocution	
24	June 6, 1962	Henry Adolph Busch	30	28	2	Male	White	California	Gas chamber	
25	June 22, 1962	James Rodney Buck	24	22	2	Male	White	Ohio	Electrocution	
26	July 3, 1962	Fred T. Sturdivant	27	22	5	Male	Black	New Jersey	Electrocution	
27	July 18, 1962	Walter Henry Mosley	26	24	2	Male	White	Texas	Electrocution	
28	July 24, 1962	Charles Noel Brown	29	27	2	Male	White	Iowa	Hanging	
29	July 31, 1962	Joseph Roland Ernst Jr.	25	22	3	Male	White	New Jersey	Electrocution	
30	August 8, 1962	Elizabeth Ann Duncan	58	54	4	Female	White	California	Gas chamber	
31	August 8, 1962	Augustine Baldonado	28	25	3	Male	Hispanic	California	Gas chamber	
32	August 8, 1962	Luis Estrada Moya	23	20	3	Male	Hispanic	California	Gas chamber	
33	August 20, 1962	Leroy Sanford McGahuey	41	40	1	Male	White	Oregon	Gas chamber	
34	August 24, 1962	James Dukes	37	31	6	Male	Black	Illinois	Electrocution	
35	August 31, 1962	Wilmon Gosa Sr.	42	39	3	Male	Black	Alabama	Electrocution	
36	September 4, 1962	Lawrence Christopher Garner	30	27	3	Male	White	California	Gas chamber	
37	September 5, 1962	Bobby Louis Stein	29	27	2	Male	Black	Texas	Electrocution	
38	September 6, 1962	Samuel Johnson	42	39	3	Male	Black	Florida	Electrocution	
39	September 6, 1962	Charles Edwin Kelley	21	20	1	Male	White	Iowa	Hanging	
40	September 24, 1962	William Earl Leach	24	21	3	Male	White	Florida	Electrocution	
41	September 24, 1962	Joe Smith	25	22	3	Male	White	Florida	Electrocution	
42	October 1, 1962	Melvin Thomas Darling	29	28	1	Male	White	California	Gas chamber	
43	October 1, 1962	Shelby Leon Doggett	25	23	2	Male	White	Oklahoma	Electrocution	
44	October 6, 1962	Roscoe Gibson	36	34	2	Male	Black	Texas	Electrocution	
45	November 14, 1962	Sammie Lee Smith	27	25	2	Male	Black	Georgia	Electrocution	
46	November 21, 1962	Allen Ditson	42	39	3	Male	White	California	Gas chamber	
47	November 30, 1962	Lowell Lee Andrews	22	18	4	Male	White	Kansas	Hanging	

== Demographics ==
Gender
Male	46	98%
Female	1	2%
Ethnicity
White	27	57%
Black	18	38%
Hispanic	2	4%
State
California	11	23%
Texas	9	19%
Florida	5	11%
Colorado	2	4%
Illinois	2	4%
Iowa	2	4%
New Jersey	2	4%
Ohio	2	4%
Pennsylvania	2	4%
South Carolina	2	4%
Alabama	1	2%
Georgia	1	2%
Kansas	1	2%
Kentucky	1	2%
Mississippi	1	2%
Oklahoma	1	2%
Oregon	1	2%
Virginia	1	2%
Method
Electrocution	29	62%
Gas chamber	15	32%
Hanging	3	6%
Month
January	5	11%
February	0	0%
March	6	13%
April	5	11%
May	6	13%
June	3	6%
July	4	9%
August	6	13%
September	6	13%
October	3	6%
November	3	6%
December	0	0%
Age
10–19	1	2%
20–29	30	64%
30–39	9	19%
40–49	6	13%
50–59	1	2%
Total	47	100%

== Executions in recent years ==
Number of executions
1963	21
1962	47
1961	43
Total	111

Preceded by 1961	List of people executed in the United States in 1962	Succeeded by 1963
