= Bouncing Ball Killer =

Unidentified American serial killer

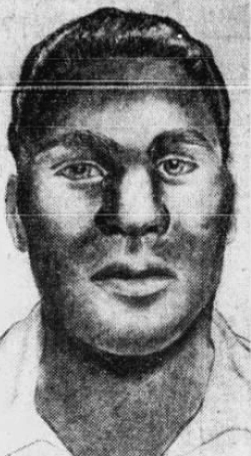
- 1960 police sketch
- Other names: "Bouncing Ball Slayer" "Bouncing Ball Strangler" "Rubber Ball Strangler"
- Status: Unidentified
- Wanted since: May 28, 1959; 67 years ago

Details
- Victims: 6–7+
- Span of crimes: May 28, 1959 – June 20, 1960
- Country: United States
- State: California

The Bouncing Ball Killer, also known as the Bouncing Ball Slayer, the Bouncing Ball Strangler, and the Rubber Ball Strangler, was an unidentified serial killer who is believed to have raped and murdered at least six women between May 1959 and June 1960 in Los Angeles, California. A majority of the victims were elderly, and all but one were strangled to death. During the investigation, a multitude of suspects were detained, and although one reportedly confessed to the crimes, no one was ever convicted of the murders, and the identity of the killer remains a mystery. The killer received his moniker from being seen bouncing a toy ball at several of the crime scenes.

== Murders ==
The first murder attributed to the suspected killer occurred on May 28, 1959, when 57-year-old Ruth Gwinn was attacked while on her way home from work. The attacker initially beat her relentlessly before dragging her into a parking lot and raping her. As witnesses tried to intervene, the man fled. Gwinn survived long enough to tell police what had happened, though it would only take a few hours until she died from her injuries. Gwinn had previously been attacked seven years prior in 1952, near where she would later be killed in 1959, although minimal evidence suggested a link.

On January 29, 1960, 73-year-old Amanda E. Rockefellow was murdered. Her body was found in an alleyway two blocks away from her home. On February 10, 1960, 60-year-old Ann Cotter was murdered while walking to church. Three months later, on May 1, 74-year-old Elmyra Miller was murdered via strangulation in her home. Evidence found at the home showed that it was likely a sexually motivated attack. Twelve days later, on May 13, 60-year-old Bessie Elva Green was raped and murdered in her apartment, which had also been burglarized.

On June 20, 83-year-old Grace A. Moore was murdered in her home. Six days later, on June 26, 72-year-old Mercedes Langeron was raped and strangled to death with a bedsheet in her home. She was found by her roommate, 62-year-old Adela Williams. Williams later told police that she had seen a man leaving the apartment as she entered it. The man, who she described as approximately six feet tall and black, was bouncing a rubber ball as he left. She also described him as wearing Ivy League clothes.

=== Other suspected crimes ===
On August 18, 1960, 51-year-old Mrs. Modie Hall and her 10-year-old granddaughter, Mary Foster, were brutally attacked in their home on the 69th block of San Pedro and Avalon by a man wielding a blunt object. Hall's son-in-law, 30-year-old Floyd Harris, was awakened by moaning and the distinct sound of a rubber ball bouncing on the floor. He pursued the intruder for several blocks but eventually lost sight of him.

Of the six occupants in the house at the time, only Foster and Hall were assaulted before the intruder fled. Both victims were hospitalized with critical injuries to the head and face but survived. The attacker was believed to be the elusive "Bouncing Ball Killer", who remained at large, but despite efforts, police were unable to apprehend the suspect.

On September 1, 1960, 84-year-old Lena Bensusen was badly beaten during a home invasion. She survived long enough for her to be taken to the hospital, where she supposedly gave a description of her attacker, which reportedly matched the description given of the Bouncing Ball Killer. On September 6, Bensusen died from her injuries while being treated at Hollywood Presbyterian Medical Center.

== Investigation ==
The murders were quickly grouped together, and based on Adela Williams' description, a composite sketch of the suspect was made and released by police artist Ector Garcia in June 1960. Newspapers and the media altogether nicknamed the killer the "Rubber Ball Strangler" and the more popular "Bouncing Ball Killer". Other news outlets nicknamed the killer the "Bouncing Ball Slayer" and the "Bouncing Ball Strangler".

By the end of June, over one hundred tips had been submitted to local law enforcement from citizens who claimed to have information in the case, but none led to any arrests.

=== Initial arrests ===
On July 3, 1960, 38-year-old Noble Harper was arrested at a shopping market, having been seen bouncing a rubber ball outside the building. He was also described as showing particular similarities with the sketch of the killer. Police found little evidence to suggest he was the killer, and the following day he was cleared as a suspect.

A bricklayer named Ray Williams was arrested on July 10, on suspicion of being the killer after police noted his similarities to the sketch of the killer. His shoe size was also consistent with the killer.

On July 23, 23-year-old Joseph Walter Malveaux was arrested after police spotted him loitering near the local coliseum. While being booked, police noticed similarities in Malveaux's facial features to that of the composite sketch of the Bouncing Ball Killer. During his interrogation, Malveaux told police that all of his friends also thought he looked like the killer but said that rumors of it being him were "a lot of boloney". His shoe size was consistent with the killer's, but besides that, police struggled to find any other evidence linking him to the murders, and as such, Malveaux was released from police custody.

== Substantial suspects ==
- On July 12, 1960, police responded to a call of a woman screaming near the city college campus. When they arrived, police noticed 35-year-old Raymond Ward Clemmons getting into his car and stopped him for questioning. Nearby, police found the body of a woman, who was identified as 19-year-old Nina T. Thoeren. Clemmons was arrested and confessed to strangling Thoeren to death. He had a criminal record, and at the time of Thoeren's murder, Clemmons was on parole after serving two years at San Quentin State Prison for a hit-and-run in 1956. According to his confession, Clemmons stated that he had offered Thoeren a ride, and presumably she jokingly asked him if he was the Bouncing Ball Killer, and in response, Clemmons said, "Sure, I'm the Bouncing Ball Killer. Look in the glove compartment. The ball is in there". Clemmons went further and confessed to being the Bouncing Ball Killer. In response to this, police ordered Clemmons to take a polygraph, which concluded that he was not being truthful when he said he was the Bouncing Ball Killer. Clemmons was sentenced to life imprisonment for the murder of Thoeren, and he was never convicted of any of the other murders.
- On September 6, 1960, police arrested 28-year-old Henry Adolph Busch for the attempted murder of a co-worker in Los Angeles. Police found a knife and a pair of handcuffs in his possession. As he was being booked at the police station, Busch confessed to the murders of two women that month: 72-year-old Shirley Payneas on September 4 and 53-year-old Margaret Briggs on September 5. He also confessed to the murder of Elmyra Miller, who was believed to have been murdered by the Bouncing Ball Killer. Busch stated his reasoning for the murders was that he had an irresistible urge to do so, albeit he later said he had been inspired to kill after watching the movie Psycho, a claim that made headlines and even got the director of the film Alfred Hitchcock to respond and deny his movie would inspire violence. Busch would be tried, convicted, and sentenced to death for the three murders. He was executed via the gas chamber on June 6, 1962.
- On August 28, 1961, Long Beach police arrested 20-year-old Charles James Golston on charges of murder in the rape and strangling of 81-year-old Dora Ann Cutting. After his arrest, he was also questioned in the disappearance of 11-year-old Karen Lynn Tompkins, although he was later cleared of suspicion in that case. Los Angeles police were made aware of the arrest and sought to question Golston in the Bouncing Ball murders. In the end he was never definitively linked to the Los Angeles killings but was subsequently tried, convicted, and sentenced to death for the murder of Cutting. He was first scheduled to be executed in January 1963 but was granted a stay of execution by Justice William Douglas. In April 1963 Golston and three other death row inmates, Don Franklin, John Vlahovich, and Joseph Rosoto, were scheduled to be executed on May 3 of that year. He later successfully appealed and got a new stay of execution. In 1972, the Supreme Court of California ruled the death penalty was unconstitutional, and that same year, following the Supreme Court decision Furman v. Georgia, the death penalty in the United States was ruled unconstitutional, causing everyone on death row, including Golston, to be resentenced to life imprisonment.

== See also ==
- List of serial killers in the United States
