= Eddie Lee Mays =

American murderer and last person executed by the State of New York

- Born: March 15, 1929; Walstonburg, North Carolina, U.S.
- Died: August 15, 1963 (aged 34); Sing Sing Prison, New York, U.S.
- Status: Executed by electrocution
- Convictions: First degree murder Manslaughter; Assault; Robbery
- Penalty: Death

Eddie Lee Mays (March 15, 1929 – August 15, 1963) was the last person to be executed by the state of New York. He was convicted of first degree murder and robbery in 1962. Mays was 34 years old at the time of execution.

== Early life ==
Eddie Lee Mays was born in Walstonburg, North Carolina, on March 15, 1929. He was the youngest of five children. His father abandoned the family for Baltimore when Eddie was 6 months old; he would later be sent to prison for murder. Mays dropped out of school when he was 14 and spent the next several months working menial jobs in his home town.

Mays later left for Baltimore, and first got into trouble in 1945. Mays was arrested for larceny, then assault for slashing his live-in girlfriend with a razor. After spending six months in jail, he returned to North Carolina. In 1951, Mays was fined $10 (equivalent to $124 in 2025) for assault after slashing a man during an argument. He returned to Baltimore a month later, and was re-arrested and sent back to North Carolina for killing a man. Mays pleaded guilty to manslaughter and served nearly seven years in prison before being released in 1958.

After his release, Mays went to New York City. There, he was convicted of felonious assault for slashing a man during an argument. Mays was given a three-year suspended sentence. His probation ended in January 1961.

== Murder, trial, and execution ==
On March 23, 1961, Mays and two accomplices, 34-year-old David Johnson and 30-year-old Jose Sanchez-Fernandez, held up the Friendly Tavern, at 1403 Fifth Avenue in East Harlem. Mays ordered the owner and the patrons to put their cash on the bar. 31-year-old Maria Marini, whom witnesses said was too slow to comply, enraged Mays. After opening her purse and finding it empty, Mays put a .38 caliber revolver to her forehead and pulled the trigger, killing her at the scene. The gang stole a total of $275 from the bartender and several customers during the robbery.

In a 1988 interview with Manuel Guerriero, who defended Mays, said he and other defense lawyers had convinced the prosecution to make an arrangement lowering his charge to second degree murder, which would have spared his life. Mays rejected the offer, saying he would prefer to be executed.

At Mays' trial, the court heard that he had been part of a gang which had committed 52 robberies in six weeks. He told reporters he would rather "fry" than spend his life in prison. After deliberating for 90 minutes, the jury found Mays guilty of first degree murder. They deliberated another 20 minutes before refusing to recommend mercy, resulting in Mays receiving a mandatory death sentence. One of the jurors in his trial was composer Robert Sour.

Johnson and Sanchez-Fernandez received life sentences. Johnson was paroled in 1976. As of 1983, he was working a job in the Bronx. Sanchez-Fernandez was paroled in 1977, but died of brain cancer a year later.

Mays entered the execution room at 10:01 p.m. on August 15, 1963, accompanied by a Protestant chaplain, and was strapped into the electric chair. He declined to make a final statement before being electrocuted, and was pronounced dead three minutes later, at 10:04 p.m.

Mays would become the last person to be executed by "Old Sparky", New York state's electric chair at Sing Sing prison. The state electrician was Dow Hover. The electric chair had been the sole method of execution in the state since 1890. Hanging had been abolished in 1888.

In 1965, the state of New York repealed capital punishment, except for cases involving the murder of a police officer. Although the legislature never fully repealed capital punishment statute, and the state even expanded it in 1995, there were no further executions due to rulings by Furman v. Georgia in 1972 at the Supreme Court and People v. LaValle in 2004 at the New York Court of Appeals.

== See also ==
- List of most recent executions by jurisdiction
- List of people executed in New York
- List of people executed in the United States in 1963
- Volunteer (capital punishment)

Executions carried out in New York
Preceded by Frederick Charles Wood March 21, 1963	Eddie Mays; August 15, 1963	Succeeded by (none) (Capital punishment abolished by state)
Executions carried out in the United States
Preceded by Sammy Tucker – Missouri July 26, 1963	Eddie Mays – New York; August 15, 1963	Succeeded by Orleander Jones – Georgia October 4, 1963
