= James Autry =

American murderer executed in Texas (1954–1984)

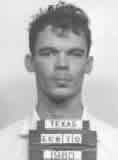
- Born: James David Autry; September 27, 1954; Amarillo, Texas, U.S.
- Died: March 14, 1984 (aged 29); Huntsville Unit, Texas, U.S.
- Occupation: Laborer
- Status: Executed by lethal injection
- Convictions: Capital murder Assault with intent to rob Burglary
- Penalty: Death

James David Autry (September 27, 1954 – March 14, 1984) was a convicted murderer in the U.S. state of Texas, executed by lethal injection.

== Life and murders ==
Autry, a native of Amarillo, was one of six children of James Autry Sr. and Shirley Stucca. His parents divorced when he was a child and he claimed his father beat him on a regular basis. Autry had been getting in trouble with the law since age 13, when he was sent to a juvenile reform school in Gatesville for shoplifting and running away from home. He obtained his high school diploma while there and was released after his 18th birthday in September 1972. Three months later, Autry walked into a Jefferson Country truck stop while drunk, a gun in hand. An employee at the truck stop disarmed him and he was arrested and convicted of assault with intent to rob. Autry began serving a three year sentence the following March but was only incarcerated for six months. After release, he obtained a job as a maintenance worker at an Amarillo racketball club. One night in December 1973, Autry got drunk and broke into the club while it was closed. He was arrested for burglary, convicted, and sentenced to eight years in prison but obtained an early release for good behavior. Autry moved to Port Arthur in March 1980 and got a job as a maintenance worker at a propane plant.

On the evening of April 20, Autry walked into a Sak-N-Pak convenience store in Port Arthur and tried to shoplift a six pack of beer. The store clerk, 43 year old Shirley Drouet, confronted him and demanded he pay for the item. Autry instead pulled out a .38 pistol and shot her in the forehead. He left the store but came back a short time later to discover two customers, Joseph Broussard, a 43 year old former Catholic priest, and Anthanasios Svarnas, a 30 year old Greek merchant seaman, examining Drouet's body, so he decided to kill them both as potential witnesses.

Police arrived a short time later after hearing reports of a shooting at the Sak-N-Pak. They found Svarnas laying outside in the parking lot, gravely wounded. In the store Joseph Broussard lay dead of two gunshots to the head and neck, his hand clutching a telephone receiver. Shirley Drouet was seated next to a store display. She died on the way to the hospital. Aside from the six pack of beer, no money or anything else was taken from the cash register or from Broussard or Drouet's wallets. Svarnas survived but sustained brain damage and was permanently disabled. An autopsy of Drouet, a mother of five children, found that the bullet had cut through her brain and lodged in the back of her head, an instantly fatal wound. The round was retrieved from the body, deformed by impact but appeared to have been fired from Autry's gun.

Autry was arrested within a few hours at the mobile home he shared with his friend John Sandifer after Sandifer and his brother gave a statement to police that the gun used in the murders had been borrowed from him. He denied having killed anyone and insisted Sandifer did the deed, but while talking to his mother over the phone at the station, he was overheard saying he'd intended to rob the Sak-N-Pak, "things got out of hand", and not to worry as he'd manage to get out of this. The crime had been committed with John Alton Sandifer, Autry's roommate. Although no money was missing from the cash register, a carton of beer valued at $2.70 was missing.

On October 4, 1983, he had been strapped in the gurney in the execution chamber, with the needles in his arms, when a stay of execution came through. He would later be executed on March 14, 1984, in the second execution in Texas since the reintroduction of the death penalty in the state after Gregg v. Georgia.

He declined to make a final statement but did request a last meal of a hamburger, French fries, and a Dr Pepper.

Autry was known as "Cowboy" on death row. As to lethal injection he said "it ain't manly" and said he would prefer to be hanged or beheaded. He also said he preferred execution to life in prison. He petitioned the Texas Board of Corrections to have his execution televised, arguing that the execution would not be "real" to the people unless they saw it. The request was refused.

He is buried at Captain Joe Byrd Cemetery.

== See also ==
- Capital punishment in Texas
- Capital punishment in the United States
- List of people executed in Texas, 1982–1989
- List of people executed in the United States in 1984

Executions carried out in Texas
Preceded by Charles Brooks Jr. December 7, 1982	James Autry; March 14, 1984	Succeeded by Ronald Clark O'Bryan March 31, 1984
Executions carried out in the United States
Preceded by Johnny Taylor Jr. – Louisiana February 29, 1984	James Autry – Texas; March 14, 1984	Succeeded by James W. Hutchins – North Carolina March 16, 1984
