= List of people executed in the United States in 1984 =

Twenty-one people, twenty male and one female, were executed in the United States in 1984, sixteen by electrocution, and five by lethal injection.

The execution of Velma Barfield this year was the first execution of a woman in the United states since the restoration of the death penalty in 1976, and the first execution of a woman in the United States since the execution of Elizabeth Ann Duncan in 1962.

== List of people executed in the United States in 1984 ==
No.	Date of execution	Name	Age of person			Gender	Ethnicity	State	Method	Ref.
No.	Date of execution	Name	At execution	At offense	Age difference	Gender	Ethnicity	State	Method	Ref.
1	January 26, 1984	Anthony Peter Antone	66	57	9	Male	White	Florida	Electrocution	
2	February 29, 1984	Johnny Davis Taylor Jr.	30	26	4	Male	Black	Louisiana	Electrocution	
3	March 14, 1984	James David Autry	29	25	4	Male	White	Texas	Lethal injection	
4	March 16, 1984	James William Hutchins	54	50	4	Male	White	North Carolina	Lethal injection	
5	March 31, 1984	Ronald Clark O'Bryan	39	30	9	Male	White	Texas	Lethal injection	
6	April 5, 1984	Elmo Patrick Sonnier	34	27	7	Male	White	Louisiana	Electrocution	
7	April 5, 1984	Arthur Frederick Goode III	30	21	9	Male	White	Florida	Electrocution	
8	May 10, 1984	James Adams	47	37	10	Male	Black	Florida	Electrocution	
9	June 20, 1984	Carl Elson Shriner	30	22	8	Male	White	Florida	Electrocution	
10	July 12, 1984	Ivon Ray Stanley	28	20	8	Male	Black	Georgia	Electrocution	
11	July 13, 1984	David Leroy Washington	34	26	8	Male	Black	Florida	Electrocution	
12	September 7, 1984	Ernest John Dobbert Jr.	46	33	13	Male	White	Florida	Electrocution	
13	September 10, 1984	Timothy George Baldwin	46	40	6	Male	White	Louisiana	Electrocution	
14	September 20, 1984	James Dupree Henry	34	24	10	Male	Black	Florida	Electrocution	
15	October 12, 1984	Linwood Earl Briley	30	25	5	Male	Black	Virginia	Electrocution	
16	October 30, 1984	Earnest Knighton Jr.	38	35	3	Male	Black	Louisiana	Electrocution	
17	October 30, 1984	Thomas Andy Barefoot	39	33	6	Male	White	Texas	Lethal injection	
18	November 2, 1984	Margie Velma Barfield	52	45	7	Female	White	North Carolina	Lethal injection	
19	November 8, 1984	Timothy Charles Palmes	37	29	9	Male	White	Florida	Electrocution	
20	December 12, 1984	Alpha Otis O'Daniel Stephens	38	29	10	Male	Black	Georgia	Electrocution	
21	December 28, 1984	Robert Lee Willie	26	22	4	Male	White	Louisiana	Electrocution	
		Average:	38 years	31 years	7 years					

== Demographics ==
Gender
Male	20	95%
Female	1	5%
Ethnicity
White	13	62%
Black	8	38%
State
Florida	8	38%
Louisiana	5	24%
Texas	3	14%
Georgia	2	10%
North Carolina	2	10%
Virginia	1	5%
Method
Electrocution	16	76%
Lethal injection	5	24%
Month
January	1	5%
February	1	5%
March	3	14%
April	2	10%
May	1	5%
June	1	5%
July	2	10%
August	0	0%
September	3	14%
October	3	14%
November	2	10%
December	2	10%
Age
20–29	3	14%
30–39	12	57%
40–49	3	14%
50–59	2	10%
60–69	1	5%
Total	21	100%

== Executions in recent years ==
Number of executions
1985	18
1984	21
1976–1983	11
Total	50

Preceded by 1976–1983	List of people executed in the United States in 1984	Succeeded by 1985
