= Arthur Frederick Goode III =

American murderer (1954–1984)

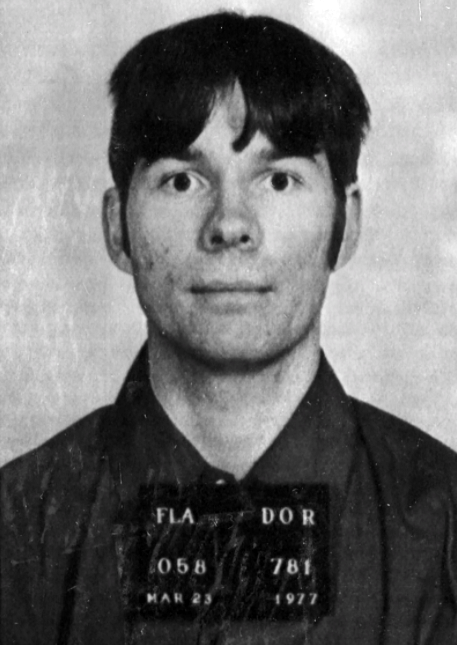
- Born: March 28, 1954; Hyattsville, Maryland, U.S.
- Died: April 5, 1984 (aged 30); Florida State Prison, Florida, U.S.
- Status: Executed by electrocution
- Convictions: Virginia; First degree murder Florida; First degree murder
- Penalty: Virginia; Life imprisonment Florida; Death

Details
- Victims: 2
- Date: March 5, 1976; March 20, 1976
- Country: United States
- States: Virginia and Florida

Arthur Frederick Goode III (March 28, 1954 – April 5, 1984) was a convicted child murderer who was electrocuted in Florida in 1984.

Goode, who was borderline intellectually disabled, began to show the behavior of a pedophile in his teenage years and got into trouble with the law early, but was always released when his parents posted bail. In mid-1975, after several reprobations of child abuse (among those the molestation of a boy of 9 years and one of 11 years), Goode was sentenced to five years of probation under the condition of psychological treatment at Spring Grove Hospital Center in Baltimore. Goode admitted himself to the treatment for several days but then left the institution and journeyed to Cape Coral, Florida, where his parents had moved.

On March 5, 1976, Goode committed the murder for which he was to be executed. In Cape Coral, he happened upon 9-year-old Jason VerDow, lured him into the woods, abused and then strangled him. Afterwards, he traveled back to Baltimore, where he abducted 10-year-old Billy Arthes and took him to Washington, D.C. There he met 11-year-old Kenneth Dawson and took both boys with him on a bus trip to Falls Church, Virginia, where he murdered Dawson with Arthes being present. Goode was apprehended by the police after a woman recognized Billy Arthes (who had since been reported as kidnapped but was physically unharmed on Goode's arrest). On being arrested, Goode told the officers: "You can't do nothing to me. I'm sick."

A jury in Virginia found him sane and guilty of murder and gave him a life sentence. Hereafter, he also received a trial in Florida for the murder of Jason VerDow. He was permitted to conduct his own defense and was sentenced to death on March 21, 1977.

Goode's father described him as, "crazier than hell and dumber than a box of rocks."

One month before his death, Goode was interviewed by John Waters for the Baltimore City Paper. Goode admitted to being a pedophile and to slaying the two boys, but saw his actions as some kind of "protest against society". He also said that if pedophiles were punished less strictly, they wouldn't need to hide by murdering their victims. Goode was said to be one of the most hated men on Florida's death row. He wrote countless letters to school teachers, seeking children for pen pals, and also to the parents of the boys he murdered, boasting of his crimes. He had a fixation with the child actor Ricky Schroder, and during an interview on the eve of his execution, he was asked if he had any last request. With a smile, he answered, "Yes, I want Ricky Schroder to sit on my lap when I am strapped into the electric chair." During the interview, he joked with reporters and had no remorse for the killing of the young boy.

For his last meal, Goode had steak, corn, broccoli and cookies. He also reportedly requested to have intercourse with a little boy for the last time. Arthur Goode was executed by electrocution on April 5, 1984. His last words were, "I have remorse for the two boys I murdered. But it's hard for me to show it."

Years later when asked to reflect on his involvement in executions, Warden Richard Dugger said, "Arthur Goode was the hardest. I had some real reservations about that one. Let's face it - he was a nut."

== See also ==
- List of people executed in Florida
- List of people executed in the United States in 1984

Executions carried out in Florida
Preceded by Anthony Antone January 26, 1984	Arthur Frederick Goode III; April 5, 1984	Succeeded by James Adams May 10, 1984
Executions carried out in the United States
Preceded by Elmo Patrick Sonnier – Louisiana April 5, 1984	Arthur Frederick Goode III – Florida; April 5, 1984	Succeeded by James Adams – Florida May 10, 1984
