= List of people executed in New Jersey =

This is a list of people executed in New Jersey. No one has been executed by the state of New Jersey since 1963, although a statute reinstating capital punishment for murder had been in force from 1982 until 2007. New Jersey executed a total of 360 people from its inception to the abolition of the death penalty on December 17, 2007. The first person executed was a slave known to history only as Tom for a rape in 1690. The last execution was of Ralph Hudson for murder on January 22, 1963. Of those executions, 187 occurred in the 20th century. The last execution for a crime other than murder (or conspiracy to murder) was of "Sam The Younger" in 1788 for arson. The last woman executed was Margaret Meierhoffer in 1881.

The youngest person to be executed in New Jersey was 13-year-old James Guild on November 28, 1828. Guild, a slave boy, who was hanged for a murdering a white woman when he was 12 in 1827. The judge, reluctant to impose the death sentence upon someone so young, referred the case to the Supreme Court of New Jersey. However, the court upheld the death sentence for the boy.

Except for a dozen slaves executed by burning in the early 18th century, executions in New Jersey were by hanging until 1906. Electrocution was used since then, with the exception of the execution of Frederick Lang in the Middlesex County jail by hanging in 1909. Hangings in New Jersey were carried out under the authority of the county in which the condemned man or woman was convicted; after the switch to the electric chair, all executions took place under state authority in the execution chamber of the Trenton State Prison, where death row and the electric chair resided. In 1982, New Jersey reinstated a death penalty scheme after the nationwide moratorium imposed by Furman v. Georgia; a year later, the state transitioned to lethal injection as their method of execution. However, they never ended up executing any inmates by that method. To this date, Ralph Hudson's 1963 electrocution is the last execution in New Jersey's state history.

In 2006, New Jersey lawmakers drafted a moratorium on executions while a task force studied the fairness and cost of the death sentence. New Jersey had eight people on Death Row at the time. On December 10, 2007, the New Jersey Senate passed a bill to repeal the current death penalty statute and replaced it with life imprisonment without parole. On Dec. 13, 2007, the state's General Assembly adopted the same law. Governor Corzine signed the bill into law on December 17, 2007. All eight of New Jersey's death row inmates (including Jesse Timmendequas, whose rape and murder of a seven-year-old girl in 1994 led to the creation of laws requiring community notification of registered sex offenders) had their sentences commuted to life without parole.

== Executions in New Jersey, 1900–1963 ==
Name	Age	Race	Method of Execution	Date of Execution	County	Crime	Governor
James Brown	?	Black	Hanging	February 9, 1900	Hudson	Murder	Foster M. Voorhees
Edward Williams	?	Black	Hanging	March 9, 1900	Mercer	Murder	Foster M. Voorhees
Edward Clifford	?	Black	Hanging	May 8, 1900	Hudson	Murder	Foster M. Voorhees
Robert Hill	28	White	Hanging	February 5, 1901	Camden	Murder	Foster M. Voorhees
Charles Brown	?	White	Hanging	December 3, 1901	Burlington	Murder and robbery of Washington Hunter, on January 24, 1901; co-defendant of John Young	Foster M. Voorhees
Robert Henson	?	Black	Hanging	December 27, 1901	Mercer	Murder in the course of arson	Foster M. Voorhees
John Young	?	White	Hanging	March 18, 1902	Burlington	Murder and robbery of Washington Hunter, on January 24, 1901; co-defendant of Charles Brown	Franklin Murphy
George Hettrick	?	Black	Hanging	April 4, 1902	Mercer	Murder	Franklin Murphy
Samuel Vanstavern	42	White	Hanging	April 8, 1902	Camden	Murder of his estranged wife Katherine, November 29, 1901	Franklin Murphy
Henry Schaub	?	White	Hanging	April 25, 1902	Essex	Murder	Franklin Murphy
Peter Herna	?	White	Hanging	September 19, 1902	Bergen	Murder	Franklin Murphy
Lafayette Gruff	21	White	Hanging	September 19, 1902	Camden	Murder of his young wife, Marie Ann "Mamie" Gertrude (née Brown)	Franklin Murphy
Job Williams	24	Black	Hanging	November 26, 1902	Cumberland	Murder in the course of a robbery	Franklin Murphy
Paul A. Woodward	23	White	Hanging	January 7, 1903	Camden	Murder of John Coffin and Price Jennings, with strychnine	Franklin Murphy
Frank Raisinger	?	White	Hanging	February 15, 1905	Cumberland	Murder	Edward C. Stokes
Arthur Laster	?	Black	Hanging	April 14, 1905	Passaic	Murder in the course of a robbery	Edward C. Stokes
Joseph Miller	?	Black	Hanging	April 14, 1905	Passaic	Murder	Edward C. Stokes
Edwin Tapley Jr.	?	Black	Hanging	December 22, 1905	Hudson	Murder	Edward C. Stokes
Charles Long	?	Black	Hanging	January 12, 1906	Mercer	Murder	Edward C. Stokes
Nicholas Murdaco	23	White	Hanging	January 26, 1906	Hudson	Murder	Edward C. Stokes
Jerry Rossa	?	White	Hanging	February 10, 1906	Bergen	Murder	Edward C. Stokes
Guisseppe Marmo	?	White	Hanging	March 22, 1906	Essex	Murder	Edward C. Stokes
Rufus Johnson	31	Black	Hanging	March 24, 1906	Burlington	Murder in the course of a sexual assault and robbery	Edward C. Stokes
George Smalls	?	Black	Hanging	March 24, 1906	Burlington	Murder in the course of a sexual assault and robbery	Edward C. Stokes
Edward Brown	?	Black	Hanging	June 28, 1906	Monmouth	Murder	Edward C. Stokes
Samuel Monich	?	White	Hanging	August 10, 1906	Morris	Murder	Edward C. Stokes
Saverio DiGiovanni	31	White	Electric chair	December 11, 1907	Somerset	Murder of Joseph Sansome in September 1907	Edward C. Stokes
Stephen Dorsey	26	Black	Electric chair	December 17, 1907	Camden	Murder in the course of a robbery	Edward C. Stokes
Charles Gibson	31	Black	Electric chair	December 17, 1907	Camden	Murder in the course of a robbery	Edward C. Stokes
James Stewart	22	Black	Electric chair	February 4, 1908	Camden	Murder	John Franklin Fort
Gilbert Matticks	45	Black	Electric chair	February 25, 1908	Cumberland	Murder	John Franklin Fort
George Wilson	27	Black	Electric chair	March 3, 1908	Essex	Murder in the course of a robbery	John Franklin Fort
Michael Tomasi	25	White	Electric chair	March 9, 1908	Hunterdon	Murder	John Franklin Fort
Giacento Ricci	35	White	Electric chair	December 22, 1908	Middlesex	Murder in the course of a sexual assault	John Franklin Fort
John Montessana	50	White	Electric chair	January 11, 1909	Essex	Murder	John Franklin Fort
Sabino Millilio	32	White	Electric chair	January 18, 1909	Hudson	Murder	John Franklin Fort
Adolphus Walker	27	Black	Electric chair	February 17, 1909	Camden	Murder	John Franklin Fort
Frederick Lang	26	White	Hanging	March 23, 1909	Middlesex	Murder of his niece, Gate Gordon, on April 20, 1906, after she rejected his marriage proposal; he was hanged because the murder occurred before the electric chair law came into effect	John Franklin Fort
Adolph Bertchey	49	White	Electric chair	August 10, 1909	Ocean	Murder during a burglary	John Franklin Fort
Richard Donegan	27	White	Electric chair	September 7, 1909	Cumberland	Murder	John Franklin Fort
George Ves	32	White	Electric chair	January 25, 1910	Middlesex	Murder	John Franklin Fort
Petro Silverio	39	White	Electric chair	August 9, 1910	Passaic	Murder	John Franklin Fort
Arthur Rose	25	Black	Electric chair	August 16, 1910	Passaic	Murder	John Franklin Fort
Howard Savage	35	Black	Electric chair	August 30, 1910	Hudson	Murder	John Franklin Fort
Gyula Toft	22	White	Electric chair	January 3, 1911	Somerset	Murder	John Franklin Fort
John Sears	31	Black	Electric chair	March 15, 1911	Mercer	Murder during a burglary	Woodrow Wilson
Christopher Buntin	34	Black	Electric chair	April 18, 1911	Essex	Murder	Woodrow Wilson
Frank Heideman	27	White	Electric chair	May 23, 1911	Monmouth	Murder in the course of a sexual assault	Woodrow Wilson
Antonio Luciano	28	White	Electric chair	January 16, 1912	Essex	Murder	Woodrow Wilson
Mariano Bellini	25	White	Electric chair	March 12, 1912	Middlesex	Murder	Woodrow Wilson
Alexander Kompovic	62	White	Electric chair	November 4, 1912	Middlesex	Murder	Woodrow Wilson
Joseph Kiviatkowski	30	White	Electric chair	January 4, 1913	Hudson	Murder	Woodrow Wilson
Charles Ford	43	White	Electric chair	February 18, 1913	Camden	Murder	Woodrow Wilson
Sanders Sylvanus	45	White	Electric chair	June 17, 1913	Hunterdon	Murder	John F. Fielder
William Diamond	21	Black	Electric chair	December 2, 1913	Mercer	Murder of Eli Stetser, a prison guard, during attempted prison break on Sept. 22, 1913	Leon R. Taylor
Edwin Williams	30	Black	Electric chair	December 16, 1913	Camden	Murder	Leon R. Taylor
William Overton	27	Black	Electric chair	December 30, 1913	Essex	Murder	Leon R. Taylor
Antonio Fiore	34	White	Electric chair	February 10, 1914	Essex	Murder	John F. Fielder
Raffael Longo	46	White	Electric chair	May 26, 1914	Union	Murder	John F. Fielder
John Dolan	41	White	Electric chair	August 8, 1914	Essex	Murder	John F. Fielder
Joseph Toth	23	White	Electric chair	November 2, 1914	Middlesex	Murder	John F. Fielder
Stefano Ruggierri	17	White	Electric chair	December 22, 1914	Somerset	Murder	John F. Fielder
George Green	24	Black	Electric chair	January 5, 1915	Monmouth	Murder of Charles A. Ely during a burglary and robbery of $27 at Ely's home on September 9, 1914; was brother-in-law of Richard Sparks	John F. Fielder
Griffin James Johnson	46	Black	Electric chair	January 5, 1915	Burlington	Murder of Charles A. Ely during a burglary and robbery of $27 at Ely's home on September 9, 1914; was brother-in-law of Richard Sparks	John F. Fielder
Richard Sparks	17	Black	Electric chair	January 5, 1915	Monmouth	Murder of Charles A. Ely during a burglary and robbery of $27 at Ely's home on September 9, 1914; was brother-in-law of Richard Sparks	John F. Fielder
Adolph Kubaszewski	30	White	Electric chair	January 26, 1915	Essex	Murder	John F. Fielder
August Martin	40	White	Electric chair	February 2, 1915	Hudson	Murder	John F. Fielder
Tony Haronovick	26	White	Electric chair	November 30, 1915	Passaic	Murder	John F. Fielder
Edgar C. Murphy	28	White	Electric chair	December 7, 1915	Burlington	Murder of Herman Fisher in July 1911	John F. Fielder
Emil Swentain	30	White	Electric chair	July 5, 1916	Monmouth	Murder	John F. Fielder
Wilson Ashbridge	22	White	Electric chair	January 2, 1917	Camden	Murder	John F. Fielder
Calogero Pettito	34	White	Electric chair	March 27, 1917	Salem	Murder in the course of a robbery	Walter Evans Edge
Francesco Nicolisi	23	White	Electric chair	March 27, 1917	Salem	Murder in the course of a robbery	Walter Evans Edge
Paul Maywoon	32	White	Electric chair	August 14, 1917	Hunterdon	Murder	Walter Evans Edge
Giovanni Iraca	34	White	Electric chair	February 9, 1918	Burlington	Murder	Walter Evans Edge
Thomas Conway	32	White	Electric chair	April 9, 1918	Camden	Murder	Walter Evans Edge
Frank Laviere	27	White	Electric chair	August 19, 1919	Middlesex	Murder in the course of a robbery	William Nelson Runyon
Michael DePalma	33	White	Electric chair	August 19, 1919	Middlesex	Murder in the course of a robbery	William Nelson Runyon
Gerino Palmieri	24	White	Electric chair	August 19, 1919	Middlesex	Murder in the course of a robbery	William Nelson Runyon
Camill Martin	25	White	Electric chair	September 14, 1920	Essex	Murder	Edward I. Edwards
Philip Schilling	29	White	Electric chair	February 1, 1921	Essex	Murder	Edward I. Edwards
Stephen Carrigan	35	White	Electric chair	March 15, 1921	Passaic	Murder	Edward I. Edwards
Frederick Pierson	40	Black	Electric chair	July 26, 1921	Warren	Murder	Edward I. Edwards
Harold V. Lamble (AKA George Brandon)	29	White	Electric chair	August 23, 1921	Union	Murder of Edith Janny and Arthur P. Kupfer on August 21, 1918	Edward I. Edwards
William Fitzsimmons	32	White	Electric chair	August 23, 1921	Middlesex	Murder	Edward I. Edwards
Raymond P. Schuck	?	White	Electric chair	August 30, 1921	Camden	Murder in the course of a robbery	Edward I. Edwards
Frank J. James	?	White	Electric chair	August 30, 1921	Camden	Murder in the course of a robbery	Edward I. Edwards
Louis J. Lively	35	Black	Electric chair	January 17, 1922	Burlington	Murder and mutilation of 7-year-old Matilda Russo in June 1921	Edward I. Edwards
George Washington Knight	26	Black	Electric chair	January 17, 1922	Middlesex	Murder of Edith M. Wilson, March 12, 1921, in the course of a sexual assault and robbery	Edward I. Edwards
George Gares	56	White	Electric chair	February 2, 1922	Middlesex	Murder and sexual assault of a female child	Edward I. Edwards
William Morehouse	57	White	Electric chair	May 31, 1922	Essex	Murder during a burglary	Edward I. Edwards
Guilford Young	28	White	Electric chair	September 15, 1922	Camden	Murder	Edward I. Edwards
William Battles	19	Black	Electric chair	February 13, 1923	Essex	Murder in the course of a sexual assault	George S. Silzer
Frank Sage	31	White	Electric chair	January 15, 1924	Hudson	Murder	George S. Silzer
Antonio Turco	34	White	Electric chair	January 29, 1924	Sussex	Murder in the course of a robbery	George S. Silzer
Angelino Carlino	38	White	Electric chair	January 29, 1924	Sussex	Murder in the course of a robbery	George S. Silzer
Frank Taylor	34	White	Electric chair	July 15, 1924	Gloucester	Murder	George S. Silzer
Edward Allen	25	White	Electric chair	July 15, 1924	Gloucester	Murder	George S. Silzer
Tony Briglia	25	White	Electric chair	July 15, 1924	Gloucester	Murder	George S. Silzer
Anthony Bagdanowitz	23	White	Electric chair	July 15, 1924	Camden	Murder	George S. Silzer
Anthony Staub	59	White	Electric chair	July 22, 1924	Passaic	Murder	George S. Silzer
Daniel Genese	24	White	Electric chair	December 15, 1925	Somerset	Murder in the course of a robbery	George S. Silzer
James Lynch	28	White	Electric chair	November 30, 1926	Bergen	Murder in the course of a robbery	A. Harry Moore
Peter Doro	32	White	Electric chair	January 11, 1927	Essex	Murder	A. Harry Moore
Paul William Feursten	45	White	Electric chair	May 17, 1927	Camden	Murder of Harriet A. Vickers on Jun. 29, 1926	A. Harry Moore
Salvatore Merra	49	White	Electric chair	August 5, 1927	Essex	Murder	A. Harry Moore
Louis Capozzi	27	White	Electric chair	November 18, 1927	Essex	Murder in the course of a robbery	A. Harry Moore
Joseph "Big Joe" Juliano	35	White	Electric chair	November 18, 1927	Essex	Murder in the course of a robbery	A. Harry Moore
Christopher Barone	21	White	Electric chair	November 18, 1927	Essex	Murder in the course of a robbery	A. Harry Moore
Nick "Little Joe" Juliano	28	White	Electric chair	November 18, 1927	Essex	Murder in the course of a robbery	A. Harry Moore
George Yarrow	28	White	Electric chair	June 1, 1928	Gloucester	Murder in the course of a sexual assault	A. Harry Moore
David Ware	49	Black	Electric chair	May 31, 1929	Mercer	Murder	Morgan F. Larson
Peter Kudzinowski	25	White	Electric chair	December 21, 1929	Hudson	Serial killer; murders of 20-year-old Harry Quinn, 5-year-old Julia Mlodzianowski, and 7-year-old Joseph Storelli	Morgan F. Larson
Joseph Marrazzo	29	White	Electric chair	January 10, 1930	Mercer	Murder	Morgan F. Larson
Frank Pannatiere	26	White	Electric chair	January 10, 1930	Mercer	Murder	Morgan F. Larson
Henry Colin Campbell (AKA Henry Close)	62	White	Electric chair	April 18, 1930	Union	Murder of Mildred Mowry in 1929; suspected of murdering Margaret Brown in 1928	Morgan F. Larson
Joseph Rado	27	White	Electric chair	July 22, 1930	Essex	Murder during the course of a robbery	Morgan F. Larson
John Murray	32	White	Electric chair	July 22, 1930	Essex	Murder during the course of a robbery	Morgan F. Larson
Louis Malanga	23	White	Electric chair	July 22, 1930	Essex	Murder during the course of a robbery	Morgan F. Larson
Victor Giampietro	24	White	Electric chair	July 22, 1930	Essex	Murder during the course of a robbery	Morgan F. Larson
Arthur Cort	22	White	Electric chair	December 29, 1930	Essex	Murder during the course of a robbery	Morgan F. Larson
William Gimbel	21	White	Electric chair	December 29, 1930	Essex	Murder during the course of a robbery	Morgan F. Larson
Joseph Calabrese	24	White	Electric chair	December 29, 1930	Essex	Murder during the course of a robbery	Morgan F. Larson
Daniel Grosso	32	White	Electric chair	April 10, 1931	Union	Murder during the course of a robbery	Morgan F. Larson
Joseph Rusnak	25	White	Electric chair	July 14, 1931	Hudson	Murder	Morgan F. Larson
Bonaventura Nardella	43	White	Electric chair	July 20, 1931	Passaic	Murder	Morgan F. Larson
Vincent Leonar	36	White	Electric chair	July 27, 1931	Essex	Murder	Morgan F. Larson
Charles Fithian	22	White	Electric chair	December 30, 1931	Salem	Murder of J. William MacCausland during a botched robbery attempt	Morgan F. Larson
Peter Giordano	20	White	Electric chair	December 30, 1931	Salem	Murder of J. William MacCausland during a botched robbery attempt	Morgan F. Larson
William Frazier	31	White	Electric chair	April 1, 1932	Union	Murder	A. Harry Moore
Raymond George	22	Black	Electric chair	April 25, 1932	Hudson	Murder	A. Harry Moore
Eugene Compo	22	White	Electric chair	June 8, 1932	Essex	Murder during the course of a robbery	A. Harry Moore
Giuseppe Di Dolce	43	White	Electric chair	July 20, 1932	Union	Murder	A. Harry Moore
John Hart	32	Black	Electric chair	April 5, 1933	Union	Murder	A. Harry Moore
Louis Fine	50	White	Electric chair	June 12, 1933	Atlantic	Murder during the course of a robbery	A. Harry Moore
Andreacy Kumachinsky	52	White	Electric chair	November 8, 1933	Hunterdon	Murder	A. Harry Moore
Melroyal Burrell	33	Black	Electric chair	March 26, 1934	Essex	Murder of Belle McGraw (also spelled Belle McCraw, or Delie McCraw), his landlord with whom he had an intimate relationship, May 18, 1933	A. Harry Moore
George DiStefano	25	White	Electric chair	March 15, 1935	Mercer	Murder during the course of a robbery	Harold G. Hoffman
Michael Mule	23	White	Electric chair	March 15, 1935	Mercer	Murder during the course of a robbery	Harold G. Hoffman
Connie Scarponi	23	White	Electric chair	March 15, 1935	Mercer	Murder during the course of a robbery	Harold G. Hoffman
John Favorito	25	White	Electric chair	October 15, 1935	Bergen	Murder during the course of a robbery	Harold G. Hoffman
Kurt Barth	22	White	Electric chair	October 15, 1935	Essex	Murder during the course of a robbery	Harold G. Hoffman
Romaine Johnson	32	Black	Electric chair	December 30, 1935	Cumberland	Murder during the course of a sexual assault and robbery	Harold G. Hoffman
Bruno Richard Hauptmann	36	White	Electric chair	April 3, 1936	Hunterdon	Famous kidnapping and murder of Charles Lindbergh Jr. on March 2, 1932	Harold G. Hoffman
Charles Zied	37	White	Electric chair	June 22, 1936	Camden	Murder	Harold G. Hoffman
Edward Metelski	26	White	Electric chair	August 4, 1936	Middlesex	Murder of a police officer	Harold G. Hoffman
Ramon Cota (AKA Orby Hethcoat)	35	White	Electric chair	January 21, 1938	Mercer	Murder	A. Harry Moore
William Stephan	29	White	Electric chair	February 8, 1938	Camden	Murder during the course of a robbery	A. Harry Moore
Doran Roach	27	Black	Electric chair	March 22, 1938	Union	Murder of Celia Kadesh and her daughter by stabbing	A. Harry Moore
Albert Faria	30	White	Electric chair	April 1, 1938	Essex	Murder	A. Harry Moore
Harry Simmons	26	Native American	Electric chair	April 1, 1938	Essex	Murder	A. Harry Moore
Smalley Burrell	23	Black	Electric chair	August 23, 1938	Gloucester	Murder during the course of a robbery	A. Harry Moore
William Brown	23	Black	Electric chair	August 23, 1938	Gloucester	Murder during the course of a robbery	A. Harry Moore
Walter Dworecki	42	White	Electric chair	March 28, 1940	Camden	Conspiracy to commit murder	A. Harry Moore
William Kupkosky	31	White	Electric chair	December 2, 1941	Essex	Murder during the course of a robbery	Charles Edison
George Foulds	23	White	Electric chair	January 6, 1942	Mercer	Murder during the course of a robbery	Charles Edison
Robert Cox	31	Black	Electric chair	March 10, 1942	Camden	Murder	Charles Edison
John Swan	26	Black	Electric chair	February 15, 1944	Middlesex	Sexual assault and murder of 20-year-old Marion Oliver	Walter Evans Edge
Howard Jefferson	30	Black	Electric chair	February 29, 1945	Salem	Murder during the course of a sexual assault	Walter Evans Edge
Arthur Degroat	35	Black	Electric chair	November 5, 1945	Bergen	Murder	Walter Evans Edge
Daniel Molnar	25	White	Electric chair	November 27, 1945	Middlesex	Murder of Adam Roszanski (his father-in-law) during a shooting spree after an argument with his wife; also indicted for murdering Deputy Police Chief Robert Shanley, Patrolman Walter Rusinack, and 11-year-old Alice Scott, December 7, 1944	Walter Evans Edge
Robert Deegan	28	White	Electric chair	December 11, 1945	Bergen	Murder during the course of a robbery	Walter Evans Edge
James Brooks	24	Black	Electric chair	April 23, 1948	Essex	Murder during the course of a robbery	Alfred E. Driscoll
George Hicks	22	Black	Electric chair	September 28, 1948	Essex	Murder during the course of a robbery	Alfred E. Driscoll
George Cole	24	Black	Electric chair	September 28, 1948	Essex	Murder during the course of a robbery	Alfred E. Driscoll
Ralph Cordasco	51	White	Electric chair	June 27, 1949	Essex	Murder	Alfred E. Driscoll
Alfred Collins	36	Black	Electric chair	August 16, 1949	Gloucester	Murder during the course of a sexual assault and robbery	Alfred E. Driscoll
Buford Tansimore	52	Black	Electric chair	April 4, 1950	Essex	Murder	Alfred E. Driscoll
Howard Auld	26	White	Electric chair	May 27, 1951	Camden	Murder during the course of a sexual assault	Alfred E. Driscoll
Clarence Smith	38	White	Electric chair	May 13, 1952	Essex	Murder	Alfred E. Driscoll
Frederick Dunk	26	White	Electric chair	May 13, 1952	Essex	Murder	Alfred E. Driscoll
Robert Jellison	23	White	Electric chair	May 13, 1952	Essex	Murder	Alfred E. Driscoll
Irving Peterson	33	Black	Electric chair	August 26, 1952	Monmouth	Murder	Alfred E. Driscoll
Theodore Walker	22	Black	Electric chair	July 27, 1954	Mercer	Murder during the course of a sexual assault and robbery	Robert B. Meyner
James Beard	40	Black	Electric chair	August 17, 1954	Camden	Murder	Robert B. Meyner
Frank Roscus	34	White	Electric chair	January 4, 1955	Essex	Murder	Robert B. Meyner
Eugene Monahan	44	White	Electric chair	January 11, 1955	Union	Murder during the course of a robbery	Robert B. Meyner
Felipe Rios	27	Asian (Filipino)	Electric chair	May 3, 1955	Camden	Murder during the course of a robbery	Robert B. Meyner
Joaquin Rodriguez	33	Asian (Filipino)	Electric chair	May 3, 1955	Camden	Murder during the course of a robbery	Robert B. Meyner
Jose Cruz	25	Asian (Filipino)	Electric chair	May 3, 1955	Camden	Murder during the course of a robbery	Robert B. Meyner
Alfred Stokes	21	Black	Electric chair	September 2, 1955	Union	Murder of Clinton E. Bond, a 37-year-old police sergeant, during a botched holdup/robbery on February 12, 1954	Robert B. Meyner
Harry Wise	22	Black	Electric chair	September 2, 1955	Union	Murder of Clinton E. Bond, a 37-year-old police sergeant, during a botched holdup/robbery on February 12, 1954	Robert B. Meyner
Albert Wise	24	Black	Electric chair	September 2, 1955	Union	Murder of Clinton E. Bond, a 37-year-old police sergeant, during a botched holdup/robbery on February 12, 1954	Robert B. Meyner
John Henry Tune	24	Black	Electric chair	August 21, 1956	Essex	Murder during the course of a robbery	Robert B. Meyner
Fred Sturdivant	27	Black	Electric chair	July 3, 1962	Essex	Sexual assault and murder of his 4 1/2-year-old stepdaughter	Richard J. Hughes
Joseph Roland Ernst	25	White	Electric chair	July 31, 1962	Camden	Murder of Joan Connor, his ex-girlfriend, on March 15, 1959	Richard J. Hughes
Ralph Hudson	43	White	Electric chair	January 22, 1963	Atlantic	Murder of Myrtle Hudson, his estranged wife	Richard J. Hughes

A complete list of 15,269 executions in the United States prior to the reintroduction of capital punishment in the 1970s was compiled by M. Watt Espy and John Ortiz Smykla, and was made available through the Inter-University Consortium for Political and Social Research. The information in the above table is sourced from M. Watt Espy's research unless otherwise specified.

== See also ==
- Capital punishment in New Jersey
- Capital punishment in the United States
