= James W. Hutchins =

American convicted murderer (1929–1984)

- NCDOC mugshot
- Born: James William Hutchins; March 26, 1929; Rutherford County, North Carolina, U.S.
- Died: March 16, 1984 (aged 54); Central Prison, Raleigh, North Carolina, U.S.
- Cause of death: Execution by lethal injection
- Convictions: New Mexico; Voluntary manslaughter North Carolina; First degree murder (2 counts); Second degree murder Assault with a deadly weapon with intent to kill Assault with a deadly weapon (2 counts); Driving under the influence Driving with a revoked license
- Penalty: New Mexico; 5 to 10 years imprisonment North Carolina; Death (September 24, 1979)

Details
- Victims: 4–5
- Date: April 1954; May 31, 1979
- Country: United States
- States: New Mexico, North Carolina, and possibly Texas

James William Hutchins (March 26, 1929 – March 16, 1984) was an American murderer and suspected serial killer who killed four people in two different states, and was questioned in the death of a fifth man in a third state. He was charged with murdering a man in New Mexico in 1954, but was convicted of voluntary manslaughter after claiming self-defense. Hutchins was later convicted of the murders of three law enforcement officers in North Carolina in 1979. He was sentenced to death and executed on March 16, 1984, by the state of North Carolina at Central Prison in Raleigh, North Carolina by lethal injection. Hutchins became the first person to be executed in North Carolina since 1977 when current capital punishment laws were enacted. The murders inspired a motion picture and prompted statewide changes in law enforcement protocol for the interagency reporting of officer murders and radio cross-communication between local agencies and the North Carolina State Highway Patrol.

== Early life and initial crimes ==
Hutchins was born on March 26, 1929, in Rutherford County, North Carolina. His father was an alcoholic who physically abused his mother and chased her with a gun. James's brother, Billy Hutchins, said he was always high-tempered.

Hutchins was widely feared, known in Rutherford County as a violent and dangerous man with a short fuse, who would attack others for a minor or no reason. At the time of his arrest in 1979, Hutchins was married and had three children. He was unemployed at the time of the murders, but had previously worked at various occupations, including as a textile worker and a carpenter. Hutchins served in the US Air Force during the Korean War and was trained as a rifleman.

In April 1954, Hutchins was arrested after fatally shooting Bruce Weibel, a 32-year-old truck driver from Texas. Hutchins, who had been hitchhiking while he was AWOL, killed Weibel after the driver picked him up in New Mexico. He then wrapped the body in a blanket and hid it under a bridge, then drove the truck before being arrested in Oklahoma. During the investigation, Hutchins was questioned in the deaths of 34-year-old James W. Pruitt in Texas in 1953, who had been killed in similar circumstances as Weibel, and an unidentified woman in Colorado he admitted to killing Weibel, claiming self-defense, but denied killing the woman. In 2009, the woman was identified as 18-year-old Dorothy Gay Howard. Serial killer Harvey Glatman is now the prime suspect in her murder, who died at San Quentin State Prison in September 1959.

Hutchins was initially charged with murder for killing Weibel. However, he was convicted of voluntary manslaughter after claiming that Weibel tried to strangle him and saying he killed him in self-defense. Hutchins was sentenced to 5 to 10 years in prison and paroled in 1959. While in prison, an official wrote "prognosis for future behavior is poor has a very poor attitude." Hutchins returned to North Carolina after his release.

In December 1966, Hutchins was charged with assault with a deadly weapon with intent to kill after attacking the husband of his ex-wife. He was given a suspended 8-month sentence and fined $200. Hutchins received two more convictions for assault with a deadly weapon and driving under the influence in 1969. He received a 6-month sentence. Afterwards, he served another four months in jail for driving with a revoked license.

== The murders on May 31, 1979 ==
On the night of May 31, 1979, Rutherford County deputies responded to a domestic disturbance call involving Hutchins and his teenage daughter, who was preparing for her high school graduation that evening and making an alcoholic drink for a party afterward. Hutchins attacked his daughter, reportedly for using vodka, and he then attacked other family members who tried to intervene to protect her. His daughter fled to a neighbor's house where the sheriff's office was called.

Rutherford County deputy sheriff's Captain Roy Huskey, 48, and Deputy Owen Messersmith, 58, arrived separately at the Hutchins residence. Hutchins shot Captain Huskey in the head with a high-powered rifle from within his home as the officer exited his patrol car. Deputy Messersmith was dispatched several minutes later to check on the captain, who had not radioed or called in.

Upon arriving at the Hutchins's home, Messersmith saw the captain lying beside his vehicle and realized that Huskey had been fatally shot. As he shifted into reverse and started to back away to cover, Hutchins shot Messersmith in the head through the windshield of his patrol car. The patrol car drifted across the road, coming to rest in a ditch. The fallen officer's body was slumped across the steering wheel, causing the horn to blow continuously. Immediately after the shootings, Hutchins fled the scene in his car, still armed with his high-powered rifle.

A frantic neighbor called the sheriff's office to report that two deputies had been shot in the Hutchins driveway. The radio dispatcher on duty fainted at the news. A jailer in the jail office across the hall heard the unattended radio and went to see why no one was responding to the officer's frantic radio calls. The jailer discovered the unconscious dispatcher and began to answer phones while calling an ambulance for the dispatcher. All available ambulances were racing towards the Hutchins's home, so the chaos intensified with the second ambulance call.

The jailer did not know to notify state highway patrol regional headquarters in Asheville, of the situation, delaying the description of the shooter and his vehicle getting to troopers. The jailer attending the phones also did not know how to use the new North Carolina Statewide Police Information Network computer system, the NC link to the FBI's nationwide National Crime Information Center, which could have enabled fast communications between the agencies in lieu of the overloaded phone lines.

Troopers were thus unaware that two Rutherford County officers had been murdered and that the suspect was at large in his car. Had the SHP Asheville dispatch center been so alerted, they could have located vehicle registration records on Hutchins' vehicle and issued an all-points bulletin and description to regional troopers.

North Carolina State Highway Patrol Trooper Robert L. "Pete" Peterson, 37, a US Army veteran who had served in combat in the Vietnam War. He was deeply well-liked and respected as a poster trooper among fellow law enforcement officers and the local citizens. He was stopped at the McDowell-Rutherford county line on US Highway 221, talking to a McDowell County trooper. Peterson heard garbled radio traffic on the Rutherford County Sheriff's frequency on his scanner. At that time, local law enforcement and the State Highway Patrol used different radio frequency bands, so troopers often used personally-owned scanners in their patrol cars to monitor both. Though Peterson could not make out the radio calls, he felt something was wrong, and he drove south on US 221 towards Rutherfordton.

Peterson radioed state highway patrol dispatchers in Asheville and asked them to call the Rutherford County Sheriff's Office and find out what was happening. State highway patrol dispatchers were not able to get through the overloaded phones at the dispatch center, due to the chaos at the Sheriff's Office.

As Peterson entered the Rutherfordton city limits on US 221, Hutchins sped past him going north. Peterson turned and pursued, apparently thinking he was simply a speeder, unaware that the suspect had just murdered two sheriff's deputies. Peterson's last radio transmission to Highway Patrol Headquarters was to give his location just north of Rutherfordton and to say the suspect had fled on foot.

At the time Peterson stopped Hutchins, communication between the highway patrol HQ and the sheriff's office was restored, and troopers realized that Peterson may have unknowingly encountered the killer of the deputies. Both on and off-duty troopers began to speed to his location when he did not check in again. Responding troopers found Peterson slumped by the driver's side of his patrol car suffering from a gunshot wound to the head. His patrol car was stopped on the northbound shoulder of a sharp curve on US 221, a distance behind Hutchins' car which was stopped near the tree line. Peterson's revolver was drawn and had been fired one time. His body position was consistent with using his vehicle's engine block for cover, a standard tactic for troopers.

== Manhunt and arrest ==
James Hutchins was captured in a dense thicket in Rutherford County on June 1, 1979, after a 12-hour search conducted by over 200 local, state and federal law enforcement officers from across western North Carolina and upstate South Carolina.

The manhunt was depicted in a 1987 feature film, Damon's Law, also known as "The Rutherford County Line." The film, shot on location by North Carolina producer Earl Owensby, portrays Rutherford County Sheriff Damon Huskey hunting for the man who killed his brother, Sheriff's Deputy Roy Huskey.

Due to the widespread anger of residents in Rutherford County, Hutchins was jailed the next day in Shelby Cleveland County, North Carolina for his own safety. He was later transferred to the more-secure Buncombe County Jail in Asheville, North Carolina.

== Hutchin's triple murder trial ==
As the trial opened on September 17, 1979, Hutchins pleaded not guilty following the prosecutor's demand that he should be executed. Days later, the jury found Hutchins guilty of two counts of first degree murder and one count of second degree murder. The same jury ruled that Hutchins should die in the state's gas chamber. Presiding Judge Donald Smith referred to Hutchins as "the most dangerous man I've ever seen."

== Appeals and execution ==
Superior Court Judge Lacy Thornburg, who would later serve as State Attorney General and as a federal judge, set Hutchins's execution date for October 15, 1981, though further appeals pushed that date back. On September 8, 1983, a new execution date was set for January 13, 1984. On January 6, leading up to his execution, James Hutchins chose lethal injection as his means of execution.

Hutchins was granted a stay of execution based on claims that his trial was prejudiced because jurors opposed to the death penalty were systemically excluded.

The stay was appealed to the U.S. Supreme Court, which ruled against Hutchins in a 5-4 verdict, with dissenting Justice William Brennan decrying the quick verdict.

"The most disturbing aspect of the court's decision is its indefensible -- and unexplained -- rush to judgment. When a life is at stake, the process that produces this result is surely insensitive, if not ghoulish," Brennan wrote. Justice Thurgood Marshall said he found the "court's haste outrageous."

Just 40 minutes before his scheduled execution on January 13, the North Carolina State Supreme Court ruled that Hutchins's execution would have to be rescheduled, as state statute requires that a new date of execution must be set whenever a stay of execution is issued and then vacated.

Hutchins was ultimately executed in North Carolina on March 16, 1984. His last meal consisted of a steak sandwich and a soft drink. He had no last words.

== Charges of political overtones in the execution ==
Leading up to Hutchins' execution, then-North Carolina Governor Jim Hunt, a Democrat, was locked in a bitter US Senate election bid against conservative Republican icon and incumbent Senator Jesse Helms. Some charged that Hunt used his position as governor to expedite Hutchins' execution. Hutchins, a poor white male, was noted by politicians to be a "perfect poster boy" to execute prior to the fall election, in order to project Hunt as a tough on crime conservative democrat.

Hunt did not commute Hutchins's death sentence, saying he found "no basis" to overrule court decisions. Hunt lost the Senate race to Jesse Helms by a substantial margin, but was re-elected as governor in 1992 and again in 1996 for two more terms. Helms served until retiring in 1996. Hunt would later comment that his role in executing Hutchins was a proud moment of his political legacy and that it was the "right thing to do".

== Aftermath and victims' legacy ==
A previous incident similar to the Rutherford County murders occurred in 1975 when North Carolina Highway Patrolman G.T. Davis of Troop "A" was shot to death in downtown Williamston, Martin County. Davis had stopped a car for running a red light at the US 64 and US 17 intersection, unaware that minutes earlier the car's occupants had robbed a bank in Jamesville, 10 miles to the east. Martin County officials had failed to report the robbery and suspects' description to the Highway Patrol. After these incidents, the State Highway Patrol made a concerted effort to have better and timelier communications with local law enforcement agencies.

Trooper Robert L. "Pete" Peterson was a former US Army and Vietnam veteran who had joined the State Highway Patrol in 1969. He had served as the longest-assigned physical training (PT) instructor in the history of the NC Highway Patrol Training Center, training close to ten trooper cadet classes. In 2016, the North Carolina State Highway Patrol named the physical training field and running track at the agency's training center in Raleigh as "Peterson Field" in honor of Trooper Peterson's legacy as the agency's most famous physical training instructor and in honor of his service. The North Carolina Department of Transportation also dedicated a portion of U.S. 221 in Rutherford County in honor of Trooper Peterson.

In 2014, two bridges on U.S. 74 were dedicated to Captain Roy Huskey and Deputy Owen Messersmith.

== See also ==
- Capital punishment in North Carolina
- Capital punishment in the United States
- List of people executed in North Carolina
- List of people executed in the United States in 1984

Executions carried out in North Carolina
Preceded by Theodore Boykin October 27, 1961	James W. Hutchins; March 16, 1984	Succeeded by Velma Barfield November 2, 1984
Executions carried out in the United States
Preceded by James Autry – Texas March 14, 1984	James W. Hutchins – North Carolina; March 16, 1984	Succeeded by Ronald Clark O'Bryan – Texas March 31, 1984
