= Henry Colin Campbell =

American murderer executed in New Jersey (1868–1930)

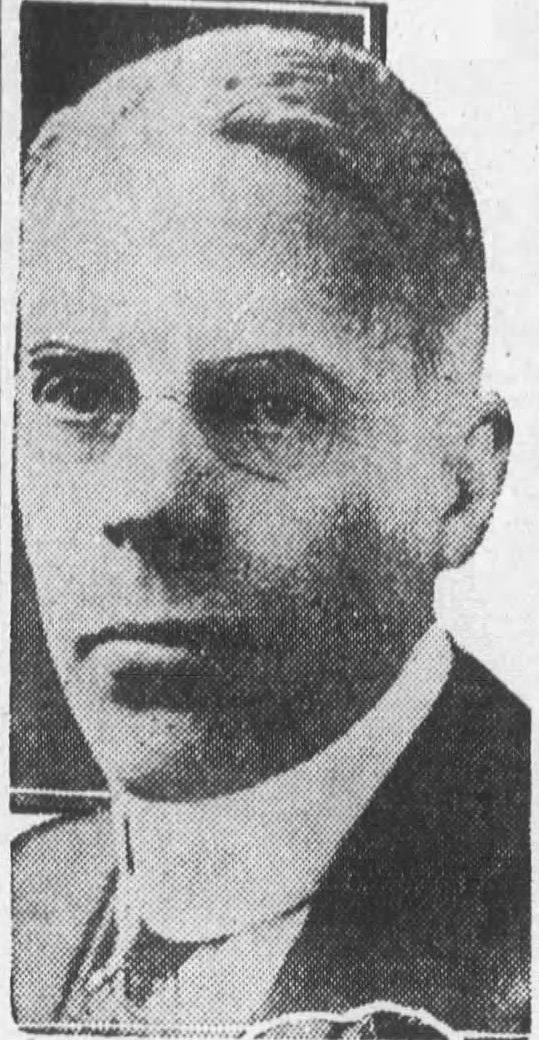
- Campbell c. 1929
- Born: Henry Colin Campbell Close; June 23, 1868; Bound Brook, New Jersey, U.S.
- Died: April 18, 1930 (aged 61); Trenton State Prison, Trenton, New Jersey, U.S.
- Other names: Henry Close; Henry Colin Campbell Close; The Torch Murderer
- Status: Execution by electrocution
- Motive: Robbery
- Conviction: First-degree murder
- Criminal charges: First-degree murder
- Penalty: Death

Details
- Victims: 1 confirmed, 1 suspected
- Span of crimes: 1928 (suspected) – 1929
- Country: United States
- State: New Jersey
- Date apprehended: 1929

Henry Colin Campbell Close (June 23, 1868 – April 18, 1930), known by the nickname The Torch Murderer, was was an American murderer and suspected serial killer executed by the State of New Jersey for the murder of Mildred Mowry, whom he met through a personal ad placed with a matrimonial agency. A career criminal and bigamist whose previous crimes were non-violent, Campbell married Mowry in 1929 despite having another wife. Six months after marrying Mowry, Campbell murdered her to collect on a $1,000 investment she owned and burned her corpse.

He was also suspected in another, similar murder of Margaret Brown in 1928. Both Mowry and Brown had been shot in the head, had their bodies dumped on the side of a road, and were set on fire.

During his adult life, Campbell worked as a civil engineer and advertising executive and posed as a physician. Using a matchmaking service in Detroit, Michigan, Campbell married several women between 1910 and 1928 although police looking into his life were never able to find any record of divorce actions.

A pair of shoes at the Mowry crime scene were traced to Campbell who subsequently confessed to killing her. He denied killing Brown and never stood trial for her murder. Campbell was executed for Mowry's murder in 1930.

== See also ==
- Capital punishment in New Jersey
- Capital punishment in the United States
- List of people executed in New Jersey
