= Joseph Roland Ernst =

Second-to-last person executed in New Jersey

- Ernst after being sentenced to death (1959)
- Born: February 17, 1937; Camden, New Jersey, U.S.
- Died: July 31, 1962 (aged 25); Trenton State Prison, New Jersey, U.S.
- Status: Executed by electrocution
- Motive: Romantic rejection
- Convictions: First degree murder Motor vehicle theft
- Penalty: Death (June 25, 1959)

Details
- Victims: Joan Connor, 17 (ex-girlfriend)
- Date: March 14, 1959
- Country: United States
- Location: Camden, New Jersey

Joseph Roland Ernst (February 17, 1937 – July 31, 1962) was an American neo-Nazi and the second-to-last person to be executed by New Jersey. A native of Camden, New Jersey, Ernst was tried and convicted of killing his 17-year-old girlfriend Joan Connor after she left him. He remains the last person to be executed against his will in New Jersey.

== Murder, trial, and execution ==
For some time, Ernst, who was on parole for car theft conviction from 1956, had been dating 17-year-old Joan Connor. Connor worked as a babysitter for Lawrence and Theresa Linden at their home in Camden. In early March 1959, however, Joan, believing that Ernst was romantically interested in 20-year-old Theresa Linden, told him that she no longer wanted to see him. On March 5, 1959, Ernst came to the Linden home and got into an argument with Joan. During the argument, he struck her on the head with a soda bottle. Ernst, who feared going back to prison, then fled to the house of a friend, Robert E. Lee, in Newark. Joan's father filed a complaint for assault and battery against him, which Ernst tried to have withdrawn.

On the evening of March 14, 1959, Ernst and Lee drove to Camden. Ernst, who'd dyed his hair several days earlier, planned to kill both Joan and Mrs. Linden, and was armed with a .32 caliber revolver, as well as a P-38 automatic. He had stolen the P-38 and ammunition from a neighbor and family friend. He also stole a pair of license plates and mounted them on his car. Ernst visited a tavern, searching for Linden, but could not find him. At midnight, he went to Linden's home and asked to see Joan. A younger man, Anthony Mannino, responded and called her to the front door. When she appeared, Ernst revealed himself. At trial, he claimed he tried to touch the injury on her head, after which she slapped him and shut the door. During his original confession, however, she'd asked him "What do you want?", to which he replied "You know what I want," prompting Joann to shut the door. As the door was shut, Ernst fired three shots through. Joann was hit twice in the chest, and once in the hand, and died within minutes. Ernst then fled to Newark, where he was arrested on March 16, 1959. Both he and Lee were charged with murder.

On June 25, 1959, Ernst was found guilty of first degree murder. He was sentenced to death after the jury did not recommend mercy. His lawyer had sought a conviction for second degree murder. Asked if he had anything to say, Ernst, pale and visibly shaken by his death sentence, replied, "No, I have nothing to say." After losing his appeal to the Supreme Court of New Jersey denied clemency by Governor Robert B. Meyner, he was scheduled for execution in March 1961. However, Ernst was granted a stay of execution by a federal appellate court so he could file further appeals.

According to fellow death row inmate Edgar Smith, Ernst was a "devotee of Adolf Hitler", who believed that "reports of the extermination of Jews were fabrications by Zionists." At the time of the murder, newspapers reported that Ernst had "H-a-t-e" tattooed onto the fingers of his right hand.

After losing further appeals, Ernst petitioned the new governor, Richard J. Hughes, for clemency. Hughes also declined to intervene. Ernst was executed by electrocution at the Trenton State Prison on July 31, 1962. His last meal consisted of turkey and stuffing, mashed potatoes and peas, lemon meringue pie, ice cream, a layer cake plus cigars. Described as defiant to the end, his last words were, "You're not going to see anything." Ernst was the last person to be executed involuntarily in New Jersey. Ralph Hudson, who was executed for the murder of his estranged wife in 1963, had rejected a plea offer and asked for the death penalty.

== See also ==
- List of people executed in New Jersey
- List of people executed in the United States in 1962
