= List of people executed in the United States in 1963 =

Twenty-one people, all male, were executed in the United States in 1963, thirteen by electrocution, six by gas chamber, and two by hanging.

The states of New York and New Jersey would carry out their final executions before abolishing capital punishment in 2004 and 2007 respectively. The United States federal government would also conduct their last execution in the pre-Furman v. Georgia era, with the next occurring in 2001. Furthermore, all pending executions at the end of the year were postponed due to the Assassination of John F. Kennedy.

== List of people executed in the United States in 1963 ==
No.	Date of execution	Name	Age of person			Gender	Ethnicity	State	Method	Ref.
No.	Date of execution	Name	At execution	At offense	Age difference	Gender	Ethnicity	State	Method	Ref.
1	January 3, 1963	Joe David Sneed	28	25	3	Male	Black	Texas	Electrocution	
2	January 20, 1963	Bennie Lee McIntyre	20	18	2	Male	Black	Texas	Electrocution	
3	January 22, 1963	Ralph James Hudson	43	41	2	Male	White	New Jersey	Electrocution	
4	January 23, 1963	James Abner Bentley	27	25	2	Male	White	California	Gas chamber	
5	February 15, 1963	Robert Harris Griffin	44	42	2	Male	Black	Ohio	Electrocution	
6	February 20, 1963	Leo Daniel Luton Jr.	34	32	2	Male	White	Texas	Electrocution	
7	March 8, 1963	Patrick Mahon McGee	55	52	3	Male	White	Arizona	Gas chamber	
8	March 14, 1963	Manuel Estrella Silvas	43	39	4	Male	Hispanic	Arizona	Gas chamber	
9	March 15, 1963	Victor Harry Feguer	27	25	2	Male	White	Federal government	Hanging	
10	March 15, 1963	Donald Lawrence Reinbolt	29	27	2	Male	White	Ohio	Electrocution	
11	March 21, 1963	Frederick Charles Wood	51	48	3	Male	White	New York	Electrocution	
12	March 29, 1963	Kenneth M. Slyter	28	27	1	Male	White	Mississippi	Gas chamber	
13	March 31, 1963	John Lavan Jr.	34	32	2	Male	Black	Texas	Electrocution	
14	June 1, 1963	Richard Henry Dare	30	27	3	Male	White	Oklahoma	Electrocution	
15	June 14, 1963	Willie J. Anderson	22	20	2	Male	Black	Mississippi	Gas chamber	
16	June 20, 1963	Joseph Chester Self	32	29	3	Male	White	Washington	Hanging	
17	July 18, 1963	Charles H. Lee	33	30	3	Male	White	Florida	Electrocution	
18	July 26, 1963	Sammy Aire Tucker	28	26	2	Male	White	Missouri	Gas chamber	
19	August 15, 1963	Eddie Lee Mays	34	32	2	Male	Black	New York	Electrocution	
20	October 4, 1963	Orleander Jones	19	Unknown	Unknown	Male	Black	Georgia	Electrocution	
21	October 18, 1963	Ollie Chandler	18	17	1	Male	Black	Georgia	Electrocution	

== Demographics ==
Gender
Male	21	100%
Female	0	0%
Ethnicity
White	12	57%
Black	8	38%
Hispanic	1	5%
State
Texas	4	19%
Arizona	2	10%
Georgia	2	10%
Mississippi	2	10%
New York	2	10%
Ohio	2	10%
California	1	5%
Federal government	1	5%
Florida	1	5%
Missouri	1	5%
New Jersey	1	5%
Oklahoma	1	5%
Washington	1	5%
Method
Electrocution	13	62%
Gas chamber	6	29%
Hanging	2	10%
Month
January	4	19%
February	2	10%
March	7	33%
April	0	0%
May	0	0%
June	3	14%
July	2	10%
August	1	5%
September	0	0%
October	2	10%
November	0	0%
December	0	0%
Age
10–19	2	10%
20–29	8	38%
30–39	6	29%
40–49	3	14%
50–59	2	10%
Total	21	100%

== Executions in recent years ==
Number of executions
1964	15
1963	21
1962	47
Total	83

Preceded by 1962	List of people executed in the United States in 1963	Succeeded by 1964
