= Henry Busch (serial killer) =

American serial killer

Henry Adolph Busch
- Busch c. 1960
- Born: December 30, 1931; California, U.S.
- Died: June 6, 1962 (aged 30); San Quentin State Prison, California, U.S.
- Years active: 1960
- Status: Executed by gas chamber
- Motive: Homicidal ideation; Rage
- Conviction: Murder (x3)
- Criminal charges: First degree murder Second degree murder (x2); Assault with intent to commit murder

Details
- Victims: 3
- Country: United States
- State: California
- Date apprehended: September 6, 1960

Henry Adolph Busch (December 30, 1931 – June 6, 1962) was an American serial killer who killed three women, including his aunt, in California in 1960. He claimed he had an irresistible urge to kill.

== Events preceding murders ==
Busch lived by himself in an apartment in Los Angeles and had no prior criminal record. He worked in a factory and sometimes had coffee before work with a fellow employee, Magdalena Parra.

== Murders ==
On May 1, 1960, Busch visited the apartment of 74-year-old Elmyra Miller. She had been his friend since he was a child. The two talked for some time and watched television together. As Busch got up to leave, he saw Miller standing with her back to him. Busch felt an urge to kill her and strangled her to death. To avoid drawing suspicion, he pulled Miller's clothing over her hips and tore her underclothing to make the murder appear to be sexually motivated. Miller's body was found by her visiting doctor the next day.

On September 4, 1960, Busch went to his adoptive's mother apartment. She was not there, but he saw Shirley Payne, a 65-year-old who lived in the apartment above his adoptive mother's apartment. He invited her to watch Psycho, which had been released months ago at the time, at a local theater. She accepted his offer. After watching the movie, the two went to Busch's apartment and drank beer, and, according to Busch, had sex. When Payne was about to leave, Busch suddenly felt an urge to kill her and strangled her to death. The following day, he bought a sleeping bag, placed Payne's body in it, and tied it shut with a rope. He kept the sleeping bag inside his apartment.

On September 5, 1960, Busch went to the apartment of 53-year-old Margaret Briggs, a half-sister of his adoptive mother. He took a knife with him. Busch viewed Briggs as an aunt and often sought her advice. He said he'd considered telling her about the killing of Payne, but decided not to. The two watched television together for several hours. Afterwards, as Briggs was standing in the room, Busch grabbed her from behind with his left forearm across her throat and strangled her. Briggs resisted more than the others, knocking over furniture. Busch told her he was sorry, but said he could not overcome his urge to kill her. Afterwards, he cut off her clothing, cutting her breast in the process. According to the police, there appeared to be cigarette burns and other wounds, including bruises around her body and her scalp, which Busch did not explain.

The next day, Busch took Briggs's car keys and drove her car to the factory where he worked. However, the place where Busch usually got coffee was closed. He met Parra nearby and asked her if she would ride with him to another place for coffee, and she agreed. However, when the two got in the car, Busch suddenly attacked Parra, attempting to strangle her. Parra managed to fight him off and escape from the car. Busch tried to turn his car on, but the engine flooded. He then tried to escape on foot, but was caught by two truck drivers. Two officers who arrived at the scene found a knife and a pair of handcuffs in his possession.

As Busch was being driven to a police station, he told the officers that he had killed two women in the past week and offered to lead them to their bodies. As the police investigated these crimes, he then confessed to Miller's murder. Busch did not take the stand as a witness in his own behalf.

== Trial and execution ==
Busch was charged with first degree murder for each killing, and pleaded not guilty by reason of insanity. He did not take the stand in his defense. Busch was convicted of assault with intent to commit murder for the attack on Payne, second degree murder for killing Miller and Payne, and first degree murder for killing Briggs since he had brought a knife. He was sentenced to death after the jury did not recommend mercy. After his appeals failed, Busch was executed in the gas chamber at San Quentin State Prison on June 6, 1962.

== See also ==
- Bouncing Ball Killer
- Capital punishment in California
- List of people executed in California
- List of people executed in the United States in 1962
- List of serial killers in the United States
