= Ralph Hudson =

Last person executed in New Jersey (1919–1963)

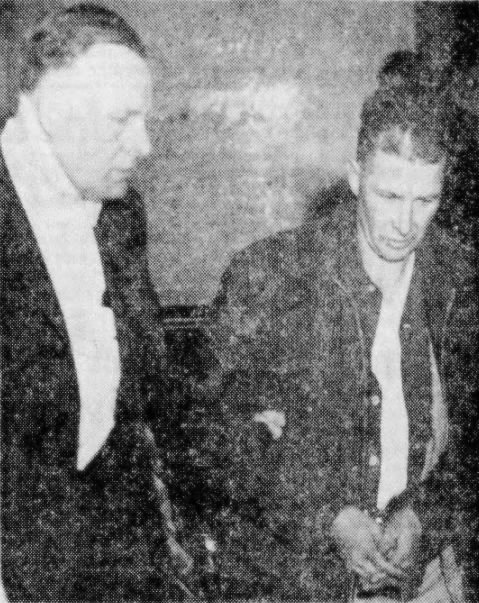
- Ralph Hudson (right) being taken into custody after the murder of his wife
- Born: February 17, 1919; Coatesville, Pennsylvania, U.S.
- Died: January 22, 1963 (aged 43); Trenton State Prison, New Jersey, U.S.
- Occupation: Carpenter
- Status: Executed by electrocution
- Convictions: First degree murder Assault and battery Attempted burglary
- Penalty: Death

Ralph James Hudson (February 17, 1919 – January 22, 1963) was the last person to be executed by New Jersey. A native of Coatesville, Pennsylvania, Hudson was convicted of stabbing his 49-year-old estranged wife Myrtle Hudson to death as she worked in an Atlantic City, New Jersey, restaurant. Preferring execution over a long prison sentence, Hudson turned down a plea offer for second degree murder. He was convicted of first degree murder and sentenced to death.

Hudson was executed by electric chair in the Trenton State Prison. Although other prisoners were sentenced to death by New Jersey after Hudson, including after the state transitioned from the electric chair to lethal injection as their method of execution, no prisoner has been executed since Hudson. The New Jersey Legislature voted to abolish the death penalty in 2007, and the measure was signed into law by Governor Jon S. Corzine.

== Background ==
Prior to the murder, Hudson was employed at a shipyard. He had lived in Pottstown, Pennsylvania, from approximately 1935 to 1957; his mother, stepfather, and three teenage children from relationships prior to Myrtle still lived in Pottstown, and he visited them frequently.

Hudson met his wife Myrtle at the same restaurant where the murder would eventually take place. Hudson had once worked at the restaurant as a cook. They were married on October 27, 1959, and remained married for only several months before Myrtle left Hudson due to his domestic abuse against her. Myrtle was Hudson's third wife, and Hudson was Myrtle's second husband.

Between 1947 and 1957, Hudson accumulated seven arrests for public intoxication and disorderly conduct. Also prior to the murder, Hudson was convicted of assault and battery, as well as attempted burglary, after going to the Brigantine, New Jersey, home of Mr. and Mrs. Edward Lighthizer, a couple that was housing Hudson's estranged wife, so he could assault Myrtle. He was sentenced to six months in jail, but he was released early on December 22, 1960, in time for Christmas. Hudson committed the murder a few days later.

== Murder ==
On December 26, 1960, the day before the murder, Hudson went on a drinking binge across multiple Atlantic City taverns. In the early morning hours of December 27, 1960, starting at approximately 2:30 am, the Lighthizers stated that Ralph Hudson called their house multiple times in the middle of the night to drunkenly threaten them and Myrtle. Later that same day, at 12:30 pm, the Lighthizers met with Hudson in front of a bar in Atlantic City. He again threatened the couple and cursed at Edward Lighthizer before entering the bar, while the Lighthizers went to a police station to file a complaint against Hudson for disorderly conduct. The stabbing took place while they were in the midst of filing the complaint.

Right before the murder, Hudson purchased a bread knife from a discount store. Hudson took the knife directly from the store to the restaurant where his estranged wife Myrtle Hudson worked and stabbed her at least twice in the lower chest or abdomen. Some witnesses stated that after stabbing Myrtle, Hudson proclaimed "Nobody is going to double cross a Hudson," while another witness stated that he said, "Nobody makes a fool of a Hudson." Yet another witness would testify at Hudson's trial that as Hudson stood over his dying wife, he spat on her and told her, "Die, Myrtle. Suffer like you made me suffer. If you don't die now, I'll kill you next time." At some point during the stabbing, a male witness subdued Hudson by striking him with a chair, causing him to drop the knife. As other witnesses attempted to aid Myrtle, Hudson told them, "Don't bother with her now; she's dead."

According to Myrtle Hudson's autopsy, she suffered multiple lacerations across her face and one hand, as well as two stab wounds in the lower chest, one of which entered her heart, although both stab wounds would have been fatal. Her death was officially due to hemorrhaging from the chest wounds.

== Trial and appeals ==
Prosecutors offered Hudson a plea deal for second degree murder that would have spared him from the death penalty, but Hudson refused.

At trial, Hudson faced a jury of eight men and four women. His trial lasted for five days. The judge presiding over Hudson's trial was Judge George Naame. Hudson testified that he was guilty of murder, stating on the stand, "Yeah, I did it." He also said he could not remember several key details of the murder, including entering the restaurant and seeing his wife; he claimed he had gone on an 18-hour drinking binge prior. Hudson's attorney expressed that he hoped the jury would consider Hudson's heavy drinking in their verdict and consider finding Hudson guilty of a lesser charge of second degree murder, which would have spared him from execution.

One witness for the prosecution stated that Hudson seemed sober during the murder. Another two witnesses for the prosecution, Edward Lighthizer and his wife, who had both attempted to shelter Myrtle during at least one previous domestic violence incident, testified about Hudson's threats. They specified that Hudson leveled death threats at them the day prior to the murder and the morning of the murder, and they added that he also threatened to "run down" their school-aged daughter if he saw her getting off of her school bus. Mrs. Lighthizer stated that during the time she and her husband were filing their disorderly conduct complaint against Hudson on December 27, 1960, Hudson was led into the station, under arrest for murdering his wife.

After his conviction, Hudson said in court, "I loved my wife more than life itself. I worshiped the ground she walked on."

Hudson's attorney recalled after the execution that Hudson did not express the will to live: "He would rather be put to death than have spent any length of time in prison." While his attorney filed routine appeals against Hudson's death sentence, Hudson expressed that the appeals were filed against his will. On January 15, 1963, Hudson's attorney made a final plea to Governor Richard J. Hughes requesting mercy for Hudson, arguing that Hudson was too intoxicated at the time of the murder to be criminally responsible for his actions. Governor Hughes refused to intervene.

== Death row and execution ==
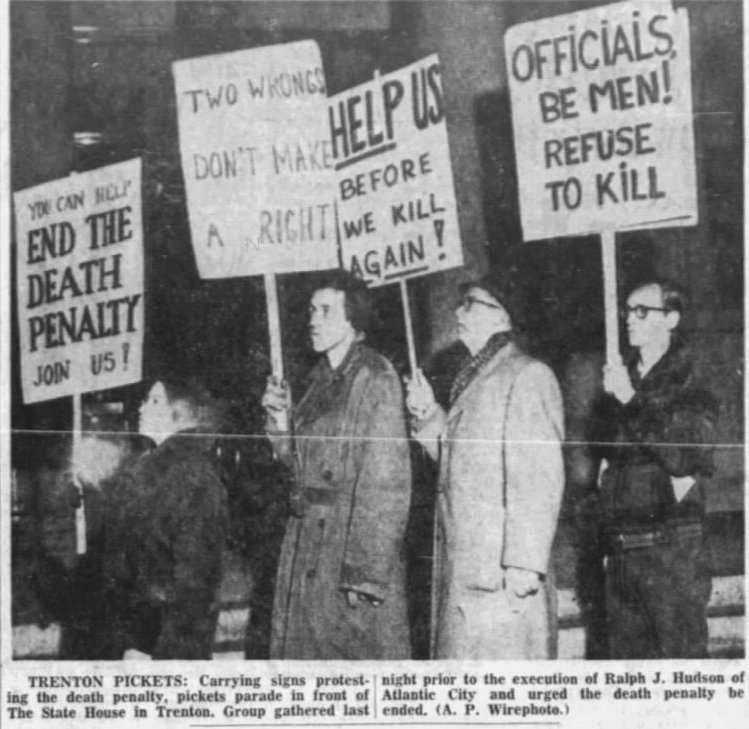
Protestors standing outside the New Jersey State House protesting Hudson's impending execution

Hudson remained on death row in the New Jersey State Prison in Trenton for 13 months between his death sentence and his execution. During his stay in the death house, prison workers described him as a quiet "model prisoner" who spent most of his time watching television. He gained 70 pounds while awaiting execution. The prison's warden stated that "[Hudson's] attitude seemed to be, 'Let's get it over with,'" and that Hudson spent significant portions of his last days writing "chipper" goodbye letters to friends. In early January 1963, less than a month before his execution, he received visits from one of his brothers and one of his sisters. His final visit, two days before his death, was from his stepfather.

On January 22, 1963, Hudson had a last meal consisting of roast beef, French fries, peas, apple pie, ice cream, and coffee, as well as cigars and cigarettes, all of which he shared with fellow inmates. Hours later, he was executed. Hudson entered the death chamber at 9:56 pm with a Methodist priest holding his hand, and Hudson was pronounced dead at 10:03 pm. He did not make a last statement and did not speak at all in the death chamber. There were approximately 50 witnesses to Hudson's death, many of whom were prison employees.

During his execution, protestors stood outside the New Jersey State House picketing, with some protesting the death penalty and some, including state assemblyman John W. Davis, supporting the death penalty.

After his execution, Hudson's body was buried in the New Jersey state prison cemetery in Hamilton Township; his gravesite was marked with a tombstone that bore a number but did not bear his name. Hudson was the last of 361 people to be executed in New Jersey's documented history.

== See also ==
- List of most recent executions by jurisdiction
- List of people executed in New Jersey
- List of people executed in the United States in 1963
- Volunteer (capital punishment)

Executions carried out in New Jersey
Preceded by Joseph Roland Ernst July 31, 1962	Ralph Hudson; January 22, 1963	Succeeded by none
Executions carried out in the United States
Preceded by Bennie McIntyre – Texas January 20, 1963	Ralph Hudson – New Jersey; January 22, 1963	Succeeded by James Bentley – California January 23, 1963
