= Frederick Charles Wood =

American serial killer

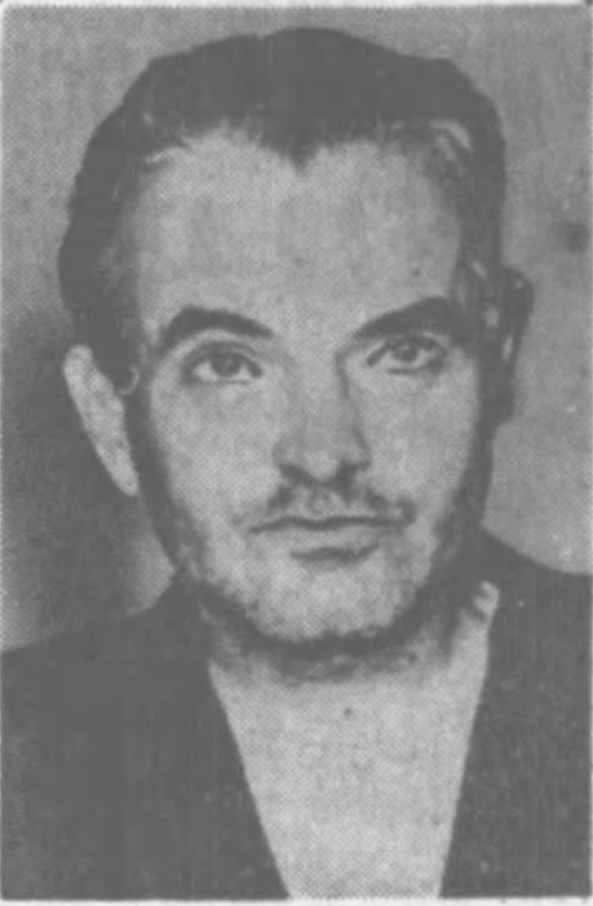
- Image of Wood taken during his incarceration, 1963
- Born: October 10, 1911; Elmira, New York, U.S.
- Died: March 21, 1963 (aged 51); Sing Sing Prison, Ossining, New York, U.S.
- Cause of death: Execution by electrocution
- Other names: John Walker; George Elwood; George Christian
- Convictions: Second degree murder (Lowman); First degree murder x2 (Rescigno and Sess)
- Penalty: 20 years to life (Lowman); Death (Rescigno and Sess)

Details
- Victims: 5 (3 convictions)
- Span of crimes: 1926–1960
- Country: United States
- State: New York
- Date apprehended: For the final time on July 3, 1960

Frederick Charles Wood (October 10, 1911 – March 21, 1963) was an American serial killer who killed five people across New York from 1926 to 1960, beginning at the age of 14. A habitual criminal who expressed no remorse for his crimes, Wood was sentenced to death and executed at Sing Sing Prison for his two final murders. He was the penultimate convict to be executed in New York, prior to the de facto abolition of capital punishment in the state.

== Early life and first crimes ==
Frederick Charles Wood was born in 1911, into a middle-class working family from Elmira, New York. While not much is known about his early childhood, Wood began engaging in petty crimes as he entered adolescence, but avoided repercussions for most of it. Later on in life, Wood claimed that he committed his first murder in 1926, aged 14, by poisoning his 20-year-old girlfriend Cynthia Mary Longo in Hornell.

Suspecting that she was dating another boy, he bought three cream puffs and laced them with arsenic, which he gave to Longo and two other friends. While the other two survived, she did not. The coroner erroneously diagnosed her cause of death as "dilation of the heart caused by excessive vomiting", listing her as 22 years old.

After completing his first year of high school, Wood quit his studies, causing conflict with his father, who sent him away to be examined at the Binghamton State Hospital. During the two months he spent there, psychiatrists deduced that the teenager had an "about average" IQ of 99. After his discharge, Wood was convicted of grand larceny and given a 10-year suspended sentence for automobile theft.

In an effort to straighten him out, his father then sent him to a private school in Dobbs Ferry, where Frederick remained for a year and a half. He was released after becoming of age. That same year, he broke the conditions of his sentence after holding up a man for 25 cents and was sent to the Elmira Reformatory, now Elmira Correctional Facility, where he remained until he was paroled in April 1931.

Wood was returned there the following year for public intoxication and harassing women. In 1932, he was temporarily transferred to the Dannemora State Hospital for the Criminally Insane, but sent back to Elmira just a few months later. In November 1932, he was paroled.

== Murder of Pearl Robinson ==
At some point in 1933, Wood, who frequently used the services of prostitutes, contracted a venereal disease, causing him to develop a seething hatred towards women. Wishing to take his anger out on someone, Wood started harassing random women on the streets of Elmira, until he came across 33-year-old Pearl D. Robinson in a suburban backyard on July 5. After grabbing hold of her, Wood strangled Robinson by wrapping a rope around her neck, before he stabbed her a total of 142 times with a knife in various locations and finally crushed her skull with an iron bar.

The vicious crime horrified the community, with police mobilizing to immediately catch the perpetrator, interviewing family members and acquaintances of the victim in order to gather potential clues. At the time, the police's leading theory was that Robinson knew her killer, prompting them to largely ignore Wood as a potential suspect. In August 1933, Wood was arrested for harassing a woman named Grace Hunsinger at a Broadway pharmacy, for which he was found guilty and ordered to serve a 7-year prison term at a local reformatory.

== Lowman murder ==
In February 1940, Wood was discharged and returned home to Elmira. In 1942, after perceiving that 42-year-old local carpenter and World War II veteran John E. Lowman had been pestering his girlfriend, Wood invited him to a rooming house in the city. After Lowman allegedly insulted his girlfriend, Wood, in a drunken rage, hit him on the head with a beer bottle. When Lowman fell, Wood stomped on his head and slashed him with his knife. Intent on dismembering the body and disposing of the remains in trash bags, Wood stuffed the body under a couch to keep it hidden.

The next day, he told his girlfriend about the murder, but did not show her the body. The day after that, Wood and his girlfriend told his father about the murder. This resulted in an argument between Wood and his father, which led to his mother calling the police and his arrest on a disorderly conduct charge. Wood pleaded guilty to the charge the following day and was sentenced to five days in the county jail. Just minutes after he was sentenced on the disorderly conduct charge, Wood's girlfriend discovered Lowman's body.

Wood was charged with murder. He was quickly convicted and sentenced to 20 years to life. The day before his sentencing, Wood unsuccessfully tried to commit suicide by slashing his wrists. At the end of his trial in March 1943, Justice Bertram L. Newman was quoted as saying that "For the protection of society, [Wood] should never be released from prison." Wood was sent off to Attica State Prison. A few months later, he was transferred to Dannemora State Hospital for the Criminally Insane. In December 1950, he was transferred to Clinton State Prison.

== Double murder and arrest ==
On June 2, 1960, despite the protests of the judges, prosecutors and residents of Elmira, the Parole Board approved Wood's parole request, on the condition that he move to Albany. Wood moved into a rooming house and found himself a job at a local laundry, but eventually had to quit it due to high blood pressure. Discouraged from his apparent failure to reintegrate into society, coupled with the fact that his apparent "bloodlust" was beginning to reemerge, on June 28, he caught a bus to New York City, breaking the terms of his parole.

On July 3, while panhandling on Broadway, Wood was approached by 62-year-old WW1 veteran John Rescigno, whom he befriended. After drinking a bottle of wine at Union Square Park, Rescigno invited Wood over to his apartment in Astoria to drink some more wine and beer. According to Wood, Rescigno had made an "indecent proposal" towards him, which caused an argument between the two men. Drunk and enraged, he broke a beer bottle on Rescigno's head, causing him to fall to his bed. Wood then used the jagged glass from the bottle to cut his throat, before grabbing a coal shovel and beating him to death with it.

He then rifled through Rescigno's pockets, stealing $7, before he stripped the dead man of his clothes and covered the nude corpse with them. Intent on robbing the apartment, Wood went to an adjacent room, where he found Rescigno's roommate, 78-year-old Frederick Sess, who was fast asleep. Sess woke up from the commotion, causing Wood to beat him to death with the broken bottle. After killing him, Wood went to the kitchen, where he left two hand-written letters: one in which he claimed that he was "so-o-o sorry" for the killings, and another in which he mockingly praised the Parole Board, telling them that "[t]hey're real intelligent people."

After leaving the apartment, Wood went to a tavern called Cronin's Bar and Grill, where he drank beer and chatted with the bartender, explaining away the blood on his hands as the result of a fight he had been in. Over the next few days, he wandered between the Bowery and Astoria, stalking women and searching for other potential victims, but was unsuccessful in doing so. In the meantime, the news director for the WELM radio station, Michael J. Morgan, after reading newspaper accounts of the double murder, realized that it shared similarities with that of Lowman decades prior.

He tipped off the police via The Associated Press, where it reached Lt. Joseph McCormack and Det. Harry Ottens, who decided to interview Wood, who by then had been jailed for violating his parole. In the subsequent interview, Wood readily confessed to all of his murders, including those of Longo and Robinson. The confession caused great outrage among the New York public and embarrassed the Parole Board, whose chairman, Russell G. Oswald, had to issue a statement declaring the decision to parole Wood "a mistake."

== Trial, imprisonment and execution ==
A few months after his arrest, Wood was brought to trial for the murders of Rescigno and Sess. Against the advice of his lawyers, Wood took the stand at his trial, readily declaring that he was sane when he committed his murders and he had loved killing. For the rest of the proceedings, he constantly cracked jokes and acted jovially, and when asked about his job status, he jokingly declared that he was a "wine sampler".

After deliberating for less than 75 minutes, the jury found him guilty on all counts, and he was convicted of the murders on September 30. At the sentencing phase on December 8, 1961, Justice Albert H. Bosch handed down the death sentence by electric chair for Wood. Wood, alternating between giggling and laughing, thanked him for "prescribing [him] the shock treatment" for his schizophrenia.

In the following years, Wood's execution was stayed on three occasions, as attorneys and civil liberties unions attempted to have his sentence commuted to life imprisonment on the grounds of insanity. In spite of their attempts, Wood dismissed them all, saying that he welcomed death and pleaded for an opportunity to "ride the lightning". On March 21, 1963, he was brought to the execution chamber at Sing Sing, where he joked to the witnesses present, stating that "[he] has a speech to make an educational project. You will see the effect of electricity on Wood. Enjoy yourself."

Wood, still laughing, then sat down in the chair, brushing it off with his hand, smoking a cigarette and waiting patiently until they had finished the preparational procedure. As the hood was placed over his face, he was still smiling. Minutes later, he was electrocuted. Wood was the penultimate prisoner executed in the state before the death penalty was abolished altogether.

== See also ==
- Capital punishment in New York (state)
- List of people executed in New York
- List of people executed in the United States in 1963
- List of serial killers in the United States
