= Barefoot v. Estelle =

- Supreme Court of the United States

Argued April 26, 1983 Decided July 6, 1983
- Full case name: Thomas A. Barefoot, Petitioner v. W. J. Estelle, Jr., Director, Texas Department of Corrections, Respondent
- Citations: 463 U.S. 880 (more) 103 S. Ct. 3383; 77 L. Ed. 2d 1090; 1983 U.S. LEXIS 110; 51 U.S.L.W. 5189; 13 Fed. R. Evid. Serv. (Callaghan) 449

Case history
- Prior: Application for federal habeas corpus denied sub nom. Barefoot v. Estelle, 5th Cir., 697 F.2d 593 (1983); cert. before judgment granted, 459 U.S. 1169 (1983).
- Subsequent: Rehearing denied, 464 U.S. 874 (1983).

Holding
- The use of psychiatric testimony predicting the defendant's future dangerousness during the sentencing phase of a capital trial does not violate the Due Process Clause. The procedures for expedited federal appellate review of capital cases are constitutional.

Court membership
- Chief Justice Warren E. Burger Associate Justices William J. Brennan Jr. · Byron White; Thurgood Marshall · Harry Blackmun; Lewis F. Powell Jr. · William Rehnquist; John P. Stevens · Sandra Day O'Connor

Case opinions
- Majority: White, joined by Burger, Powell, Rehnquist, O'Connor
- Concurrence: Stevens
- Dissent: Marshall, joined by Brennan
- Dissent: Blackmun, joined by Brennan, Marshall (parts I, II, III, IV)

Laws applied
- 28 U.S.C. § 2253

Barefoot v. Estelle, 463 U.S. 880 (1983), was a landmark decision by the Supreme Court of the United States that addressed two critical issues in the administration of the death penalty: the admissibility of psychiatric testimony predicting a defendant's future dangerousness and the procedures for expedited federal appellate review in capital cases.

Barefoot's attorneys argued that psychiatrists are not able to predict the future dangerousness of an individual criminal defendant with acceptable accuracy. The American Psychiatric Association submitted an amicus curiae brief in support of the defendant's position that such testimony should be inadmissible and urging curtailment of psychiatric testimony regarding future dangerousness. The Court ruled that psychiatric predictions of future dangerousness could be presented to a jury during the sentencing phase of a capital trial.

The significance of Barefoot as a precedent was that it established a stay of execution was not automatic. The ruling held that even after a habeas petitioner was granted a certificate of appealability by demonstrating a "substantial denial of a federal right," a court could still deny a stay based on its threshold judgment of the claim's merits.

== Background ==
Joseph L. Hoffmann analyzed the background of the habeas corpus procedure and the changing landscape signaled by the Court's decision in Barefoot v. Estelle which allowed an appeals court to use "expedited procedures" to decide the merits of habeas appeals:

probably the biggest problem with habeas in capital cases is the absence of a time limit...the State sets an execution date, even if it knows that the execution will not actually take place, because this is the only way to make the prisoner use up his federal claims by filing a habeas petition and requesting a stay. After the petition is filed, the habeas court grants a stay so it will have sufficient time to resolve the claims. If the court rejects the claims, the State sets another execution date, and the cycle resumes. The cycle ends only when the habeas court finally becomes confident enough, or angry enough, to reject a habeas petition without first granting a stay.

=== Case history ===
In 1978, Thomas Barefoot (February 23, 1945 – October 30, 1984) was convicted in Bell County, Texas for murdering a police officer. During the sentencing phase of his trial, the prosecution sought the death penalty based on Texas's capital sentencing statute, which required the jury to determine whether the defendant would constitute a "continuing threat to society" (future dangerousness).

The state called two psychiatrists to testify: Dr. James Grigson and Dr. James Holbrook. Neither doctor had examined Barefoot. Instead, they gave their opinion about a hypothetical based on the facts of the crime and Barefoot's prior criminal history. Based solely on this hypothetical, both psychiatrists testified that Barefoot would certainly commit future acts of criminal violence and was a "continuing threat to society."

Grigson called Barefoot a "criminal sociopath" and said there was no treatment for this condition and it was ‘one hundred percent and absolute’ that Barefoot would commit violent crimes in the future (even if incarcerated). The other psychiatrist placed Barefoot in the "most severe category" of sociopath. The jury considered this as well as other evidence and imposed the death penalty.

==== Appeals ====
Barefoot's attorneys appealed, arguing that the use of psychiatric predictions of future dangerousness based on a hypothetical, without a personal examination, was so unreliable that it violated the Eighth Amendment's prohibition on cruel and unusual punishment and the Fourteenth Amendment's Due Process Clause. They cited significant criticism from within the psychiatric profession itself, including the American Psychiatric Association (APA), which had filed an amicus curiae brief stating that such predictions of long-term future dangerousness were fundamentally unreliable and wrong two times out of three. The Texas Court of Criminal Appeals (CCA) denied his appeal.

Barefoot filed a state habeas corpus petition which was denied on October 7 1981. He then filed a federal habeas petition at the United States District Court for the Western District of Texas raising the same objections to the use of psychiatric testimony. The execution was stayed and an evidentiary hearing held on July 28 1981. The district court denied the writ and vacated the stay on November 9 1982.

Although the District Court rejected his claims and denied the writ, it did issue a "certificate of probable cause" allowing Barefoot to petition the court of appeals for review of the psychiatric predictions. The Texas Court of Criminal Appeals denied a second writ of habeas corpus and denied a stay of execution. The Court of Appeals also denied a stay of execution, and Barefoot's execution was scheduled for January 25 1982. After the CCA on January 11 denied a motion for a stay, Barefoot filed a motion for a stay pending appeal at the Fifth Circuit Court of Appeals under 28 U.S.C. § 2252, which was denied on January 20:

We think, however, that the Supreme Court has, by implication at least, approved of psychiatric testimony in cases such as these. In Jurek v. Texas, the Supreme Court rejected the argument that requiring the jury to predict future behavior is so vague and uncertain as to be meaningless. While the Court did not deal specifically with what types of evidence the jury may hear, the Court stated that a jury is equipped to make such a determination.

The Court of Appeals also cited the Supreme Court decision Estelle v. Smith, 451 U.S. 454 (1981), which clarified in dicta that the Court was "in no sense disapproving the use of psychiatric testimony bearing on future dangerousness". Evaluating the merits of the appeal, and "finding no patent substantial merit, or semblance thereof, to petitioner's constitutional objections", the appeals court denied the motion for a stay.

The Supreme Court granted certiorari before judgment on January 24 on the question of "the appropriate standard for granting or denying a stay of execution pending disposition of an appeal by a federal court of appeals by a death-sentenced federal habeas corpus petitioner, and also the issues on appeal before the United States Court of Appeals for the Fifth Circuit".

== Supreme Court ==
=== Decision ===
Barefoot claimed there was no final judgment when the Fifth Circuit denied his stay because the judgment of the district court was not expressly affirmed. The Court upheld the Fifth Circuit's practice of expediting death penalty appeals: "Federal courts are not forums in which to relitigate state trials."

The Court also ruled, on the merits, that challenging Jurek was comparable to "asking us to disinvent the wheel".

Barefoot's attorney's argued that dangerousness predictions were not reliable. The APA submitted an amicus brief arguing that the only basis for prediction was a history of repetitive past violence, an inference that could by drawn by any lay person, and that experts with "no special insights" may bias the jury with their testimony and "masquerade [their] personal preferences as 'medical' views".

The Court was not persuaded: "Neither petitioner nor the [American Psychiatric Association] suggests that psychiatrists are always wrong with respect to future dangerousness, only most of the time."The Court reasoned the adversarial system could be trusted to determine the accuracy of such statements.

=== Dissent ===
Justice Blackmun wrote a scathing dissent stressing the unreliability of the expert testimony: "when the Court knows full well that psychiatrists' predictions of dangerousness are specious, there can be no excuse for imposing on the defendant, on the pain of his life, the heavy burden or convincing a jury of laymen of the fraud".

Although Blackmun upheld the constitutionality of the death penalty in Furman v. Georgia, and for 13 years never dissented in a death penalty case, he was so outraged the Court would allow medical testimony "so unreliable and unprofessional that is violates the canons of medical ethics" that his dissent Barefoot v. Estelle is recognized as a shift of his vote for death penalty cases. He dissented again in Darden v. Wainwright and, near the end of his tenure, Blackmun said he felt "morally and intellectually obligated simply to concede that the death penalty experiment has failed".

== Subsequent developments ==
Barefoot was executed on October 30, 1984, at the age of 39. Barefoot continues to be an influential criminal procedure case.

=== Certificate of appealability: Second and successive petitions ===
Since 1908, a "certificate of probable cause" (CPC) has been required to appeal a district court's dismissal of a habeas petition, and in 1925 Congress expanded the appellate jurisdiction of circuit courts to grant the CPC. After the Antiterrorism and Effective Death Penalty Act of 1996 the terminology changed to certificate of appealability (COA). Barefoot established the standard for granting them: "substantial showing of the denial of [a] federal right".

After AEDPA, Slack v. McDaniel (2000) held that the Barefoot standard applied to COA requests for procedural dismissals of "mixed petitions". Miller-El v. Cockrell (2003) held that when a constitutional claim is dismissed by a district court under AEDPA the same standard applies.

Barefoot is also a binding precedent for the admissibility of dangerousness predictions. Thus, circuit courts have consistently ruled against granting a COA for constitutional claims to challenge the admissibility of this type of testimony.

=== Expert witnesses ===
The Barefoot decision was one of the most criticized Supreme Court decisions in modern history for admitting psychiatric testimony of future dangerousness.

The Court's decision in this death penalty case was very important in influencing the legal opinion regarding psychiatric predictions of dangerousness, a position with which the American Psychiatric Association and other medical ethicists disagree, leading some experts to conclude that a psychiatrist making such statements verges on the brink of being a quack. Forensic experts state that psychiatric testimony on ultimate questions at law is unreliable due to the inherent limitations of current psychiatric clinical and experimental knowledge and practice. Nevertheless, courts have been willing to accept such testimony despite the lack of empirical evidence that these predictions of future dangerousness are accurate, and the Court's highly criticized reliance on the adversarial system continues to be the precedent applied by circuit courts.

Ake v. Oklahoma held that indigent defendants who are unable afford to hire independent experts to rebut the dangerousness predictions of the state's psychiatric experts are entitled to state-paid assistance.

=== Dr. James Grigson aka "Dr. Death" ===
Dr. James P. Grigson, one of the psychiatrists that testified in this case, was expelled from the American Psychiatric Association and the Texas Association of Psychiatric Physicians (TAPP) for making statements in testimony on defendants he had not examined. The TAPP said his expulsion was due not only to his replies to hypothetical questions but also for predicting dangerousness with 100% certainty.

== See also ==
- List of people executed in Texas, 1982–1989
- List of people executed in the United States in 1984
