= Stay of execution =

Temporary order to stop a court judgment from being executed, pending review

A stay of execution (Law Latin: cesset executio, "let execution cease") is a court order to temporarily suspend the execution of a court judgment or other court order. The word "execution" refers to the imposition of whatever judgment is being stayed and is similar to an injunction.

A stay can be granted automatically by operation of law or by order of a court, either following a motion or by agreement of the parties. If a party appeals a decision, any judgment issued by the original court may be stayed until the appeal is resolved.

== Death penalty stays ==
In cases that the death penalty has been imposed, a stay of execution is often sought to defer the execution of the convicted person. That may occur if new evidence is discovered to exonerate the convicted person or in attempts to have the sentence commuted to life imprisonment. In the United States, all death sentences are automatically stayed pending a direct review by an appeals court. If the death sentence is found to be legally sound, the stay is lifted.

One example of a stay of execution in the death penalty context was the James Autry case. Autry was already strapped down to the execution table in Texas on 4 October 1983 when the order came to stop the execution. He was executed a few months later, on 14 March 1984.

US District Court Judge Nanette Laughrey granted a stay of execution on 19 November 2013 in response to a motion by the lawyers of Joseph Paul Franklin that the use of the drug pentobarbital in a lethal injection would constitute cruel and unusual punishment. The following day, the US Supreme Court upheld an appeals court decision to lift the stay of execution. Franklin was put to death on 20 November 2013.

Another case is that of Kho Jabing in Singapore. Kho, who was a Malaysian detained on death row for the murder of Chinese national Cao Ruyin, received a death warrant which ordered that his execution was to be carried out on 6 November 2015. Through his lawyer, Kho managed to suspend his execution while pending a newly filed last-minute appeal against his sentence. Earlier on, in 2013, while he had spent three years on death row for killing Cao Ruyin during a robbery in 2008, changes to the law had officially abolished the mandatory death penalty for murder committed with no intention to kill and included an alternative sentence of life imprisonment with caning for such a crime, which allowed all death row inmates to apply to reduce their sentences. Kho was eligible for such an entitlement and received a life sentence with 24 strokes of the cane. However, he was once again sentenced to death upon the prosecution's appeal to the higher courts of Singapore in early 2015, which was narrowly allowed by a majority vote of 3–2, as the majority of the judges found that the manner of killing demonstrated both viciousness and a blatant disregard for human life, which would make it more appropriate for Kho to be hanged rather than having him jailed for life.

After the suspension of Kho's execution, a few months later, in April 2016, Kho lost his appeal, as the Court of Appeal found there was little new material and evidence for the court to conclude that there was a miscarriage of justice in Kho's case, and not convincing enough for the court to reopen the concluded 2015 criminal appeal. Later, a new date was set for the execution to take place, and it was released, with the death warrant ordering that Kho should be executed at dawn on 20 May 2016. However, this execution was once again postponed by another stay of execution granted in view of an appeal filed the night before Kho's execution. The appeal was thrown out the next morning since the court felt that the defence was just rehashing their old arguments, which the court believed amounted to an abuse of the court, which led to the judges to strongly and critically reprimand Kho's lawyers for their conduct. Shortly after the rejection of his final appeal, Kho was then hanged on the afternoon of 20 May 2016.
