= Elizabeth Ann Duncan =

American murderer (1904–1962)

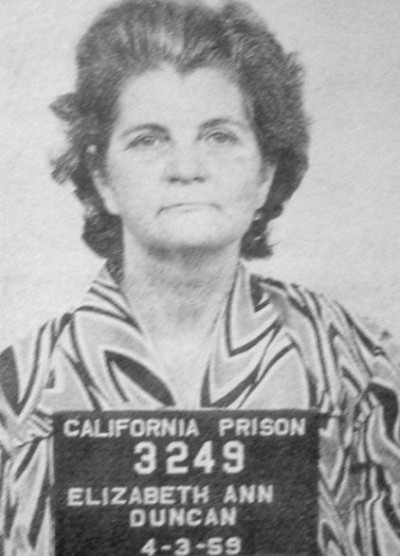
- Duncan on April 3, 1959
- Born: Hazel Lucille Sinclaira Nigh; April 16, 1904; Kansas City, Missouri, U.S.
- Died: August 8, 1962 (aged 58); San Quentin State Prison, California, U.S.
- Known for: Being the last woman executed prior to Furman v. Georgia
- Status: Executed by gas chamber
- Conviction: First degree murder
- Penalty: Death

Elizabeth Ann Duncan (born Hazel Lucille Sinclaira Nigh; April 16, 1904 – August 8, 1962) also known as Ma Duncan, was an American murderer. She was convicted of orchestrating the murder of her daughter-in-law in 1958. She was the last woman to be executed in California before the United States Supreme Court suspended the death penalty under Furman v. Georgia.

Duncan was convicted of hiring 25-year-old Augustine Baldonado and 20-year-old Luis Moya to murder her daughter-in-law, Olga Duncan, who was seven months pregnant at the time. All three were executed in the gas chamber at San Quentin State Prison on August 8, 1962, the last triple execution in California.

== Early life ==
Duncan was born on April 16, 1904, in Kansas City, Missouri. She admitted in court to having been married ten times. She had been arrested for operating a brothel in San Francisco and passing bad checks. She had made her son, Frank, the center of her life. She also had a daughter, Patricia, who died at age 15. Under oath, Duncan admitted that she had four children in total, but loved Frank the most.

== Son's marriage ==
When her son Frank threatened to move out of the apartment they shared, Elizabeth attempted suicide via an overdose of pills. During her recovery at Cottage Hospital in Santa Barbara, she was cared for by nurse Olga Kupczyk. Frank dated Kupczyk, then married her on June 20, 1958, after learning that she was pregnant. A furious Elizabeth harassed Olga at work, forcing her to change addresses several times, and even admitted in court to plotting to kidnap Frank "to try to talk some sense into him. I didn't want to lose Frankie. I couldn't stand life alone and I knew it." The couple separated two weeks after they married.

== Case ==
In November 1958, Olga Duncan disappeared. Her mother-in-law first drew suspicion when police discovered she had illegally obtained an annulment by hiring a man, Ralph Winterstein, to pose as Frank while she posed as Olga.

Nearly a month later, investigators found Olga's body in the Casitas Pass of Carpinteria. Baldonado confessed that he and Moya had been offered $6,000 by Duncan to kill Olga, then directed the police to the site. According to the coroner and their confession, the two men kidnapped her, beat her with a pistol, strangled her, and buried her in a shallow grave. She may still have been alive when buried. Frank Duncan (who was an attorney) got his mother's bail reduced from $50,000 to $5,000, then went into hiding. Elias Kupczyk traveled from his home in Benito, Manitoba, but could not bring his daughter's remains back to Canada until her now-missing husband, by law, her next-of-kin, was located.

The trial began on February 24, 1959. Duncan testified that Moya and Baldonado attempted to blackmail her, refuting the accounts of every witness called by the prosecution, including Moya and Baldonado. Her attorneys then presented the theory that Olga was the victim of a ransom plot. The jury took 4 hours and 51 minutes to find her guilty on March 16, 1959; she was sentenced to death four days later. Frank, Burt M. Henson, and two other attorneys represented her in the appeals process; Henson was appointed by trial judge Charles Blackstock to represent Baldonado and Moya. Governor Pat Brown, an opponent of capital punishment, ultimately allowed the executions to proceed. Right up until the minutes before her execution, Duncan fought to save his mother's life.

On September 15, 2023, Frank Duncan, by then in his nineties, was disbarred by the State of California after having received three prior disciplinary actions.

== See also ==
- Capital punishment in California
- List of people executed in the United States in 1962

== Publications ==
- Catherine Fogarty, Someone You Know: An Unforgettable Collection of Canadian True Crime Stories, Collins, 2023
- Deborah Holt Larkin, A Lovely Girl: The Tragedy of Olga Duncan and the Trial of One of California's Most Notorious Killers, Pegasus Crime, 2022
- Jim Barrett, Ma Duncan, Pentland Press, 2004
