= Gary Kinder (author) =

American writer

- Occupations: Author; lawyer; teacher / speaker; Creator and Founder of WordRake, the first editing software for professionals
- Writing career
- Subjects: Sociology, true crime
- Notable works: Ship of Gold in the Deep Blue Sea, Victim: The Other Side of Murder

Gary Kinder is a New York Times bestselling author, a lawyer, and an entrepreneur, who created and founded WordRake, the first editing software for professionals. He authored the true crime classic Victim: The Other Side of Murder (1982), Light Years: An Investigation into the Extraterrestrial Experiences of Eduard Meier (1987), and The New York Times Best Seller Ship of Gold in the Deep Blue Sea (1998).

== Work ==
Kinder researched his first book for seven years before publishing it. Victim is based on the real characters and events of the Hi-Fi Murders that occurred on April 22, 1974, in Ogden, Utah, and has been cited by reviewers as a pioneering work, because it was one of the first true crime books to focus on the victims of a violent crime rather than on the perpetrators.

Light Years: An Investigation into the Extraterrestrial Experiences of Eduard Meier — a comprehensive investigation of Billy Meier, a Swiss farmer's claims he was contacted by extraterrestrials — was first serialized in Playboy. Ship of Gold in the Deep Blue Sea addresses the story of the sidewheel steamer SS Central America, sometimes called the "Ship of Gold," which sank in 1857 during a hurricane off the Carolina coast, and in the 1980s became the object of a feverish hunt by treasure seekers.

Since 1988, Kinder has taught legal writing to lawyers and judges throughout the United States. He has worked as a consultant, delivering seminars on legal writing at law firms and corporate legal departments. Kinder has also created popular training programs for the American Bar Association.

In 2012, Kinder created and founded the software company WordRake, which holds ten U.S. Patents. The company's eponymous software is an automated editing program that suggests changes to improve brevity and clarity.

== Personal life ==
After graduating from the University of Florida Law School, Kinder lived as an "impoverished writer" – working as a busboy, bartender, and bellman "anything to keep his days free to write" – during his seven years working on Victim. Afterward, he sold the film rights for a six-figure sum in addition to proceeds from the book deal.

Kinder lives with his wife in Seattle. He continues writing and teaching advanced writing seminars to professionals across the United States.
