= Jeffrey Daugherty =

American convicted serial killer

- 1988 mugshot of Daugherty
- Born: September 26, 1955; Detroit, Michigan, U.S.
- Died: November 7, 1988 (aged 33); Florida State Prison, Florida, U.S.
- Status: Executed by electrocution
- Convictions: Florida: First degree murder (3 counts); Kidnapping; Armed robbery; Pennsylvania: First degree murder (2 counts)
- Penalty: Florida: Death; Pennsylvania: Life imprisonment

Details
- Victims: 5+
- Date: February 23 – March 11, 1976
- Country: United States
- States: Florida, Pennsylvania
- Date apprehended: March 12, 1976
- Imprisoned at: Florida State Prison

Jeffrey Joseph Daugherty (September 26, 1955 – November 7, 1988) was an American serial killer who committed at least five murders in both Pennsylvania and Florida. Between February and March 1976, Daugherty, who was accompanied by his girlfriend Bonnie Heath, robbed and killed four women and one man in both states, and he was arrested on March 12, 1976.

Daugherty was sentenced to life imprisonment by the Pennsylvania courts for the two homicides committed within the jurisdiction, and while he was also given life imprisonment for two of the three murders committed in Florida, Daugherty was sentenced to death during his third murder trial in Florida for the 1976 death of Lavonne Sailer. Daugherty was executed by the electric chair on November 7, 1988, at the Florida State Prison. Heath herself was jailed for lesser charges pertaining to the murders.

== Personal life ==
Jeffrey Joseph Daugherty, a native of Detroit, Michigan, was born on September 26, 1955. According to sources, Daugherty was abandoned by his mother at the age of two, and he was thus raised by his grandparents. His father, who likewise neglected his son, was both a drifter and alcoholic who had stayed at mental asylums for psychiatric problems, and married five times. Daugherty's father was also previously incarcerated for child abuse. After reaching adulthood, Daugherty was married with two children, but the marriage ended with a divorce.

== Murders ==
Between February and March 1976, 20-year-old Jeffrey Daugherty embarked on a robbery spree that led to at least five murders in Pennsylvania and Florida.

=== Florida ===
On February 23, 1976, at Hammock in Flagler County, Florida, 68-year-old convenience store attendant Carmen Abrams and her husband were attacked by Daugherty during a robbery at a local food store. Abrams and her husband were both shot by Daugherty, and the shooting resulted in the death of Abrams, and her husband was grievously wounded.

On March 1, 1976, six days after murdering Abrams, 49-year-old Lavonne Patricia Sailer became Daugherty's second victim, when she was hitchiking in Melbourne and was picked up by both Daugherty and Heath. They drove her to a secluded spot near the Brevard County landfill. There, Daugherty ordered her out of the vehicle, robbed her, and then shot her five times at close range with a .22 caliber pistol. On the same day he murdered Sailer, Daugherty killed 50-year-old pizzeria owner Betty Campbell during a robbery in Edgewater, Volusia County, Florida.

=== Pennsylvania ===
On March 9, 1976, in Hollidaysburg, Pennsylvania, Daugherty committed another firearm robbery at a local convenience store, where he shot and killed 28-year-old Elizabeth Shanks (also spelt Elizabeth Shank) by shooting her five times in the head.

On March 11, 1976, 18-year-old George Karns, a service station attendant, was robbed at a gas station by Daugherty in Duncansville. Karns was shot five times in the head and killed instantly, thus becoming the fifth and final victim of Daugherty.

== Trials and sentencing ==
=== Charges ===
A day after the murder of George Karns, Jeffrey Daugherty and Bonnie Heath were arrested in Virginia, and after their involvement in the murders were revealed, the pair were charged with the murders by the state authorities from both Florida and Pennsylvania. He was also charged for an unrelated armed robbery in Virginia, and given 18 years' imprisonment for the crime.

=== Daugherty's murder trials ===
==== Pennsylvania ====
Daugherty was first tried by the Pennsylvania courts for the murders of George Karns and Elizabeth Shanks.

Firstly, Daugherty was tried for the murder of Shanks and found guilty by a Blair County jury in December 1976. He was sentenced to life in prison for the crime.

Secondly, for the murder of Karns, Daugherty was found guilty, and sentenced to death by a separate Blair County jury in January 1977. The death sentence, however, was later commuted to life imprisonment by the Pennsylvania Supreme Court.

==== Florida ====
After the conclusion of trial proceedings in Pennsylvania, Daugherty was sent back to Florida to face trial for the three murders committed in the state, where capital punishment was allowed for first degree murder.

In July 1980, Daugherty pleaded guilty to the murder of Betty Campbell in the first of his series of Florida trials, and sentenced to a third term of life imprisonment, which was ordered to run consecutively with the other sentences he received in Pennsylvania and Virginia.

Within the following month after his conviction for Campbell's murder, Daugherty was given a fourth life sentence after pleading guilty to the murder of Carmen Abrams within a three-hour court hearing. The prosecution had originally sought a death sentence, but they changed their mind after Abrams's husband was found unfit to testify in court due to his poor health.

In November 1980, Daugherty was put on trial for the third and final time, this time for the murder of Lavonne Sailer. Likewise, Daugherty pleaded guilty to the charges, but however, a Brevard County jury recommended the death penalty for Daugherty. He was thus sentenced to death on April 27, 1981, after a trial judge accepted the jury's recommendation.

=== Fate of Bonnie Heath ===
As for Bonnie Heath, she was acquitted of murder during her trial in Pennsylvania, but was convicted of criminal conspiracy and robbery, and sentenced to ten to twenty years for the first charge, plus five to ten years for the second charge. Her conviction and sentence were reversed upon appeal in 1981 in favour of a new trial. In the end, Heath pleaded guilty to second degree murder after reaching a plea agreement with the Florida state prosecution in exchange for her testimony, and was sentenced to 25 years in prison. She was eventually released on July 10, 1987, after spending more than ten years behind bars.

== Appeal ==
On March 13, 1981, the Pennsylvania Supreme Court allowed the appeal of Daugherty and remanded his case of George Karns's death for a re-trial. He was never re-tried for Karns's murder, but his other life sentence for the murder of Elizabeth Shanks remained.

On September 14, 1982, the Florida Supreme Court dismissed the appeal of Daugherty.

In April 1984, the U.S. Supreme Court rejected Daugherty's appeal.

On April 9, 1987, the Florida Supreme Court unanimously rejected Daugherty's second appeal. On that same day, convicted murderers Judy Buenoano and Johnny Copeland also lost their appeals to the same court.

On February 12, 1988, the 11th Circuit Court of Appeals turned down Daugherty's appeal. Afterwards, the U.S. Supreme Court denied Daugherty's final appeal, thus officiating his eligibility to be executed on a date to be determined.

== Execution ==
Jeffrey Daugherty was originally scheduled to be executed on October 15, 1987, but it was postponed by the 11th Circuit Court of Appeals while pending an appeal.

On October 8, 1988, Florida Governor Bob Martinez signed a second death warrant for Daugherty, scheduling him to be executed on November 4, 1988.

As a final recourse to avoid execution, Daugherty filed last-minute appeals to stave off his execution. A federal appellate court denied his appeal, and less than an hour before his execution would proceed, the U.S. Supreme Court dismissed Daugherty's final appeal per a 5–4 vote.

On November 7, 1988, 33-year-old Jeffrey Joseph Daugherty was put to death by the electric chair at the Florida State Prison. In his last statement, which took six minutes to complete, Daugherty stated that he was "going to be free" through his execution. Daugherty reportedly declined the standard last meal of steak, potato, beans, corn, ice cream, milk and fruit punch, but he accepted some root beer and ice cream that his father bought for him during a final prison visit. Outside the prison, a small vigil was held by death penalty opponents before the execution, and they reportedly appealed for mercy on Daugherty.

Daugherty was the 19th person to be executed in Florida after the state resumed the use of capital punishment since 1976. Daugherty's execution took place nearly three months before infamous serial killer Ted Bundy was put to death on January 24, 1989, for multiple rape-murder cases.

In the aftermath, Daugherty was one of several infamous serial killers who committed murders in Pennsylvania. He was also one of four convicted killers to be executed for crimes committed in Volusia and Flagler Counties as of 2019, the year when serial killer Gary Ray Bowles was slated to be the fifth on the list.

== See also ==
- Capital punishment in Florida
- Capital punishment in Pennsylvania
- List of people executed in Florida
- List of people executed in the United States in 1988
- List of serial killers in the United States

Executions carried out in Florida
Preceded by Willie Jasper Darden March 15, 1988	Jeffrey Joseph Daugherty; November 7, 1988	Succeeded by Ted Bundy January 24, 1989
Executions carried out in the United States
Preceded by Donald Gene Franklin – Texas November 3, 1988	Jeffrey Joseph Daugherty – Florida; November 7, 1988	Succeeded by Raymond Landry Sr. – Texas December 13, 1988
