= Funchess =

Funchess is a surname of German origin, and an Americanized variant of Funccius. Notable people with the surname include:

- Carlos Funchess (born 1969), American basketball player and coach
- David Funchess (1947–1986), American war veteran and convicted murderer
- Devin Funchess (born 1994), American football player
- Tom Funchess (born 1944), American football player
