= List of people executed in the United States in 1986 =

Eighteen people, all male, were executed in the United States in 1986, eleven by lethal injection, and seven by electrocution.

== List of people executed in the United States in 1986 ==
No.	Date of execution	Name	Age of person			Gender	Ethnicity	State	Method	Ref.
No.	Date of execution	Name	At execution	At offense	Age difference	Gender	Ethnicity	State	Method	Ref.
1	January 10, 1986	James Terry Roach	25	17	8	Male	White	South Carolina	Electrocution	
2	March 12, 1986	Charles William Bass	29	22	7	Male	White	Texas	Lethal injection	
3	March 21, 1986	Arthur Lee Jones	47	43	4	Male	Black	Alabama	Electrocution	
4	April 15, 1986	Daniel Morris Thomas	37	27	10	Male	Black	Florida	Electrocution	
5	April 16, 1986	Jeffrey Allen Barney	28	23	5	Male	White	Texas	Lethal injection	
6	April 22, 1986	David Livingston Funchess	39	27	12	Male	Black	Florida	Electrocution	
7	May 15, 1986	Jay Kelly Pinkerton	24	17	7	Male	White	Texas	Lethal injection	
8	May 20, 1986	Ronald John Michael Straight	42	33	9	Male	White	Florida	Electrocution	
9	June 9, 1986	Rudy Ramos Esquivel	50	42	8	Male	Hispanic	Texas	Lethal injection	
10	June 19, 1986	Kenneth Albert Brock	37	25	12	Male	White	Texas	Lethal injection	
11	June 24, 1986	Jerome Bowden	33	23	10	Male	Black	Georgia	Electrocution	
12	July 31, 1986	Michael Marnell Smith	40	31	9	Male	Black	Virginia	Electrocution	
13	August 20, 1986	Randy Lynn Woolls	36	29	7	Male	White	Texas	Lethal injection	
14	August 22, 1986	Larry Smith	30	22	8	Male	Black	Texas	Lethal injection	
15	August 26, 1986	Chester Lee Wicker	37	31	6	Male	White	Texas	Lethal injection	
16	September 19, 1986	John William Rook	27	21	6	Male	White	North Carolina	Lethal injection	
17	December 4, 1986	Michael Wayne Evans	30	20	10	Male	Black	Texas	Lethal injection	
18	December 18, 1986	Richard Andrade	25	22	3	Male	Hispanic	Texas	Lethal injection	
		Average:	34 years	26 years	8 years					

== Demographics ==
Gender
Male	18	100%
Female	0	0%
Ethnicity
White	9	50%
Black	7	39%
Hispanic	2	11%
State
Texas	10	56%
Florida	3	17%
Alabama	1	6%
Georgia	1	6%
North Carolina	1	6%
South Carolina	1	6%
Virginia	1	6%
Method
Lethal injection	11	61%
Electrocution	7	39%
Month
January	1	6%
February	0	0%
March	2	11%
April	3	17%
May	2	11%
June	3	17%
July	1	6%
August	3	17%
September	1	6%
October	0	0%
November	0	0%
December	2	11%
Age
20–29	6	33%
30–39	8	44%
40–49	3	17%
50–59	1	6%
Total	18	100%

== Executions in recent years ==
Number of executions
1987	25
1986	18
1985	18
Total	61

Preceded by 1985	List of people executed in the United States in 1986	Succeeded by 1987
