= Arthur Gary Bishop =

American serial killer (1952–1988)

- Bishop's 1988 mugshot
- Born: September 29, 1952; Hinckley, Utah, U.S.
- Died: June 10, 1988 (aged 35); Utah State Prison, Utah, U.S.
- Other names: Lynn Jones, Roger W. Downs
- Status: Executed by lethal injection
- Convictions: First degree murder (5 counts); Aggravated kidnapping (5 counts); Sexual abuse of a minor; Embezzlement
- Penalty: Death

Details
- Victims: 5
- Span of crimes: October 14, 1979 – July 14, 1983
- Country: United States
- State: Utah
- Date apprehended: July 24, 1983

Arthur Gary Bishop (September 29, 1952 – June 10, 1988) was an American serial killer and sex offender who abducted, sexually assaulted, murdered, and mutilated five young boys in Salt Lake City, Utah, between 1979 and 1983. He voluntarily led police to the burial sites of his victims upon being questioned in July 1983 for the disappearances of several children. In his confession, he said that he had killed his victims to cover up the fact that he had molested them. Described as "scheming, calculating, and cunning" by prosecutors, Bishop was convicted and sentenced to death in 1984. He declined to pursue any appeals and spent four years on death row at Utah State Prison before being executed by lethal injection in 1988.

== Early life ==
Arthur Gary Bishop was born on September 29, 1952, in Hinckley, Utah. He was the eldest of six boys born to Eugene and Carol (née Talbot) Bishop, both of whom had ancestors that had resided in the area for decades. Bishop said that his first feeling of sexual gratification came after seeing a picture of the binding of Isaac in the Book of Genesis.

Growing up in Hinckley, Bishop was an Eagle Scout and a devout Latter-day Saint. He was a quiet child who was described as a loner but also very intelligent. From 1966 to 1970, he attended Delta High School, where he was recognized as an honors student who succeeded best in business classes. He was elected to be the school's business manager and was a keynote speaker at his graduation. He enrolled at Stevens–Henager College, where he majored in accounting and business administration. He was recognized by college president J. M. Stevens as an honors student with a 3.7 GPA in 1971. When he was 19, Bishop served as a missionary for the Church of Jesus Christ of Latter-day Saints in the Philippines.

He took up a job as a bookkeeper at a Ford dealership in 1978. He was arrested for embezzlement in February 1978 and given a five-year suspended sentence, but he skipped his parole and fled to Salt Lake City, living under the alias "Roger Downs." In 1979, he was excommunicated from the LDS church.

While in Salt Lake City, he joined the Big Brothers program, where he was a "big brother" to a 10-year-old boy for nearly a year. Bishop was forced out of the program, before his first murder, after directors discovered he was molesting other children.

== Murders ==
=== Alonzo Daniels ===
Bishop killed his first victim, a four-year-old named Alonzo Daniels, on October 14, 1979. He lured the boy from the courtyard of his apartment complex to his own apartment with the promise of free candy. After attempting to sexually assault Daniels, Bishop took him to the bathroom, hit him on the head with a hammer, and drowned him in the bathtub. He fondled the boy's dead body and mutilated his genitals. He put Daniels into a box and carried him out, walking past the boy's mother, who was frantically calling her son's name. He then buried the body in Cedar Valley. Bishop relived the experience in the following months by buying and killing puppies, stating, "It was so stimulating. A puppy whines just like Alonzo did. I would get frustrated at the whining. I would hit them with hammers or drown them or strangle them."

=== Kim Peterson ===
Bishop molested a young boy, later known by the pseudonym "John," using money and toys to ensure John's compliance. On November 8, 1980, John introduced Bishop to 11-year-old Kim Petersen at a roller-skating rink. At Bishop's request, John agreed to contact Petersen on the pretext of buying a pair of roller skates that Petersen was trying to sell, all so Bishop could obtain photographs of Peterson. When Bishop and John called Petersen, Bishop took the phone and asked Peterson to meet Bishop and John at a pool parlor. Bishop asked Peterson to go out to Cedar Valley and hunt rabbits. Peterson said yes, and after convincing him to take photos in the car, they got out and started walking. Bishop, walking behind Petersen, shot Peterson in the back with a .38 caliber revolver. Petersen began crying and Bishop shot him twice more in the head. Bishop molested Peterson's corpse, mutilated him in a fit of anger, and buried him, close to the body of Alonzo Daniels. Law enforcement authorities routinely questioned Bishop, but Bishop was not considered a suspect in Petersen's disappearance. Witnesses described the man Petersen had talked with at the roller-skating rink as white, aged 25–35, around 200 pounds, and with dark hair.

=== Danny Davis ===
On October 20, 1981, Bishop lured 4-year-old Danny Davis from a supermarket to his home half a block away. After playing with toys at Bishop's house, Davis became bored and started to cry. Concerned about the noise, Bishop put his hand over the boy's nose and mouth and suffocated him. Some other boys were coming over to Bishop's house, so he put the body in a couple of garbage bags and placed it in the corner of the kitchen. The next morning, after breakfast, Bishop took the body to Cedar Valley. Davis is the only murder victim whom Bishop did not molest. Several shoppers recalled a smiling man standing near the child but could only give vague descriptions of his appearance. Police launched one of the biggest searches in Salt Lake County history: teams of searchers scoured neighborhoods, divers dredged ponds and lakes, shoppers at the supermarket where Davis vanished agreed to undergo hypnosis to dislodge greater details of the abductor, fliers were printed offering a $20,000 reward, and the FBI was contacted, but the boy was not located.

=== Troy Ward ===
After murdering Danny Davis, Bishop vowed to never do it again. However, almost two years later, on June 22, 1983, Bishop abducted Troy Ward while the boy was waiting on the corner near his home for his mother to return from the store with ice cream and cake; it was his sixth birthday. Bishop, now using the alias Roger Downs, took Ward to his bungalow and asked if he wanted to play a game. Ward said yes, and Bishop handcuffed him, tied him between two pillars in his basement, and pulled his pants down. When Ward began to cry, Bishop hit him with a rubber mallet until he was silent. Bishop put Ward's body in a trash bag and tossed it into a stream in Big Cottonwood Canyon, thinking it would be easier than burying another body in the desert.

=== Graeme Cunningham ===
On July 14, 1983, 13-year-old Graeme Cunningham was set to go on a trip to California with a friend and his father: "John" and Roger Downs (Arthur Bishop). After Bishop picked up Cunningham, he tricked the teenager into going back to his home to pick up some marijuana to sell for cash. Bishop asked if Cunningham would pose for some photos, to which he agreed, in exchange for a skateboard. Bishop was afraid Cunningham would tell, so he hit Cunningham in the head twice with a hammer. He took Cunningham to the bathroom, filled the tub, and drowned him. He disposed of the body the same way he did Ward's. Two days later, "John" and Bishop went to California.

== Arrest ==
Local police looked into their past reports and found that Bishop (Roger Downs) lived in the vicinity of four of the abductions and knew the fifth child's parents. Police brought him in for questioning on the pretext of his assisting officers with their inquiries into Graeme Cunningham's disappearance. Feeling the pressure of the interrogation, Bishop told detectives he wanted to show them something at his house. When they arrived, they found more than 300 photos of young boys, some placed in a white wedding album, and 125 pictures of naked boys cut out from magazines. Police were able to identify and interview 21 boys he photographed and molested, but Bishop said that their estimate was low and to "double or triple" that amount for a more accurate total. Back at the station, police managed to obtain Downs's real name and eventually got him to confess to all five murders. The confession lasted less than an hour, after which Bishop led the police to the graves in Cedar Valley. He said that he killed his victims to cover up the fact that he was molesting them.

== Victims ==
- Alonzo Daniels, age 4, October 14, 1979
- Claude Kimley Peterson, age 11, November 8, 1980
- Danny Davis, age 4, October 20, 1981
- Troy Ward, age 6, June 22, 1983
- Graeme Cunningham, age 13, July 14, 1983

== Trial and execution ==
Bishop was brought to trial on February 27, 1984. During his trial, Bishop said that an addiction to child pornography molded his violent sexual fantasies and eventually drove him to act them out. The trial lasted three weeks; on March 19, 1984, Bishop was found guilty of five counts of first degree murder, five counts of aggravated kidnapping, and one count of sexually abusing a minor, and sentenced to death. Upon receiving his sentence, Bishop apologized to his victims' families and requested to be executed by lethal injection.

After his conviction, he wrote a letter in which he explained the motivation for his crimes:

I am a homosexual pedophile convicted of murder, and pornography was a determining factor in my downfall. Somehow I became sexually attracted to young boys and I would fantasize about them naked. Certain bookstores offered sex education, photographic, or art books which occasionally contained pictures of nude boys. I purchased such books and used them to enhance my masturbatory fantasies... Finding and procuring sexually arousing materials became an obsession. For me, seeing pornography was lighting a fuse on a stick of dynamite. I became stimulated and had to gratify my urges or explode. All boys became mere sexual objects. My conscience was desensitized and my sexual appetite entirely controlled my actions.

Bishop was executed by lethal injection at Utah State Prison in Point of the Mountain on June 10, 1988. He declined a last meal. Before his execution, he again expressed remorse for his crimes:

"I want to offer again my most profound and heartfelt apologies to my victims' families. I am truly sorry. I have tried my best to empathize with their grief and devastation and I hope they come to know of my concerns and prayers for them."

== See also ==
- List of people executed in Utah
- List of people executed in the United States in 1988
- List of serial killers in the United States

Preceded by Dale Selby Pierre	Executions in Utah since 1976	Succeeded by William Andrews
