= Glass v. Louisiana =

- Supreme Court of the United States

Decided April 29, 1985
- Full case name: Jimmy L. Glass v. Louisiana
- Citations: 471 U.S. 1080 (more) 105 S. Ct. 2159; 85 L. Ed. 2d 514; 1985 U.S. LEXIS 1731

Court membership
- Chief Justice Warren E. Burger Associate Justices William J. Brennan Jr. · Byron White; Thurgood Marshall · Harry Blackmun; Lewis F. Powell Jr. · William Rehnquist; John P. Stevens · Sandra Day O'Connor

s
- Dissent: Brennan, joined by Marshall

Glass v. Louisiana, 471 U.S. 1080 (1985), was a case denied for hearing by the United States Supreme Court in 1985. The case is famous for Justice Brennan's dissent from the denial of certiorari, joined by Justice Marshall, arguing that the death penalty is always unconstitutional.

== Background ==
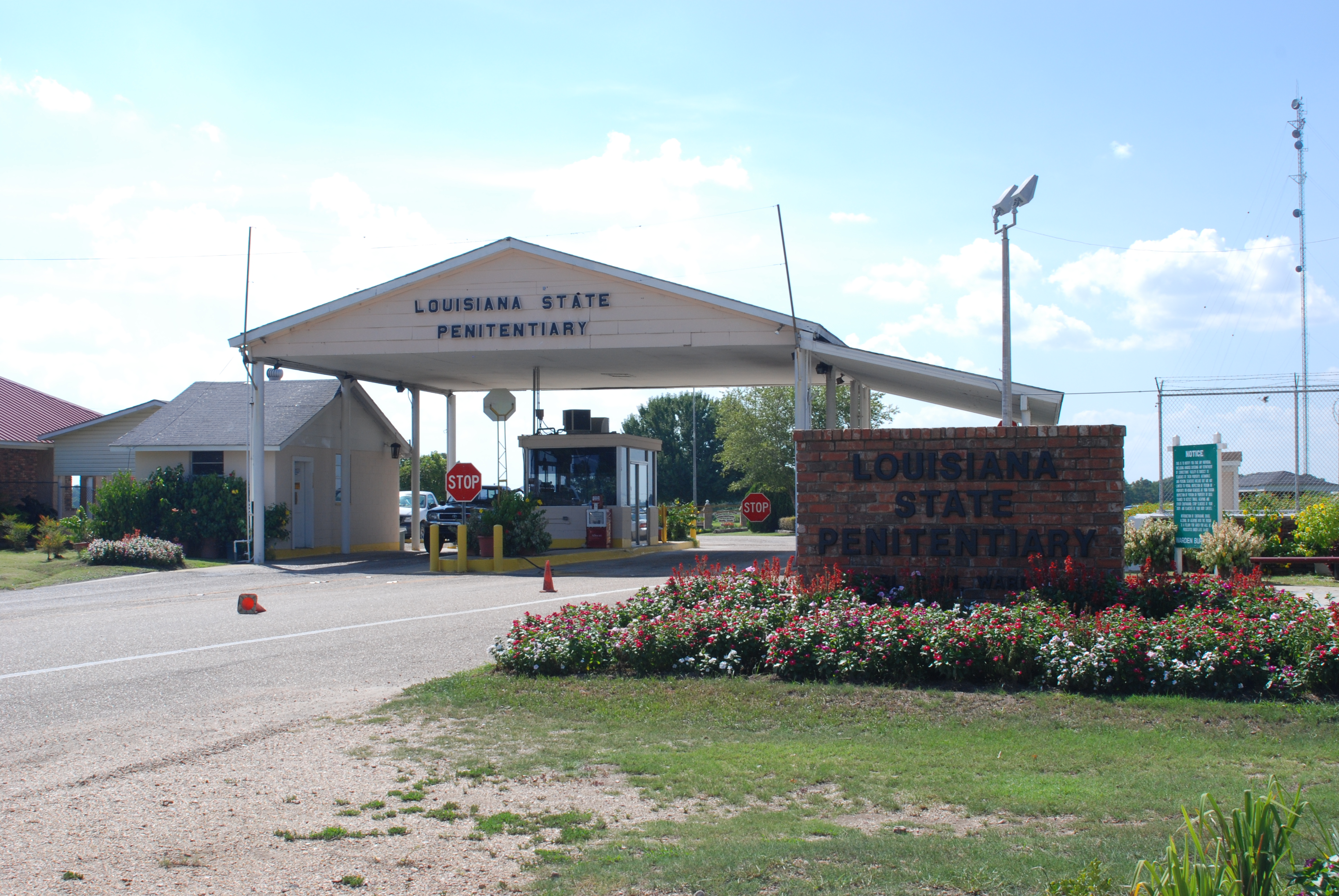
Louisiana State Penitentiary, where Glass was confined and executed

Jimmy L. Glass (May 27, 1962 – June 12, 1987) was an American convicted murderer who was sentenced to death by the state of Louisiana.

Glass originally hailed from Arkansas. He was a high school dropout and had a criminal record. With fellow inmate Jimmy C. Wingo (March 14, 1952 – June 16, 1987), Glass escaped from the Webster Parish, Louisiana Jail in December 1982. During their escape, Glass and Wingo killed Newt Brown (born 1927) and his wife, Erlene Nealy Brown (born 1931), at their home on Christmas Eve in the village of Dixie Inn outside Minden. The Browns' son, Gary Lamar Brown, was the son-in-law of Judge Charles A. Marvin (1929–2003) of the Louisiana Court of Appeal for the Second Circuit, based in Shreveport. Glass and Wingo were soon arrested. Both were sentenced to death in the electric chair.

According to then-current Louisiana law, the only authorized method of execution was the electric chair. Glass and his lawyers argued that executions by electrocution violate the Eighth and Fourteenth Amendments to the United States Constitution, because causing to pass through the body of the person convicted a current of electricity of sufficient intensity to cause death, and the application and continuance of such current through the body of the person convicted until such person is dead and electrocution causes the gratuitous infliction of unnecessary pain and suffering and does not comport with evolving standards of human dignity.

== Opinion of the Court ==
The court denied certiorari, thereby allowing the lower court's decision to stand.

Justice William J. Brennan (joined by Justice Thurgood Marshall) dissented from the denial of certiorari. In his dissent, Brennan reiterated his "belief that the 'physical and mental suffering' inherent in any method of execution is so 'uniquely degrading to human dignity' that, when combined with the arbitrariness by which capital punishment is imposed, the trend of enlightened opinion, and the availability of less severe penological alternatives, the death penalty is always unconstitutional."

Brennan's dissent is known for its gruesome depiction of electrocution:

"Th[e] evidence suggests that death by electric current is extremely violent and inflicts pain and indignities far beyond the 'mere extinguishment of life.' Witnesses routinely report that, when the switch is thrown, the condemned prisoner 'cringes,' 'leaps,' and 'fights the straps with amazing strength.' 'The hands turn red, then white, and the cords of the neck stand out like steel bands.' The prisoner's limbs, fingers, toes, and face are severely contorted. The force of the electric current is so powerful that the prisoner's eyeballs sometimes pop out and 'rest on [his] cheeks.' The prisoner often defecates, urinates, and vomits blood and drool."

Brennan also concluded that electrocution is "nothing less than the contemporary technological equivalent of burning people at the stake."

== Subsequent developments ==
The Court, by majority 5–4, found that electrocution as an authorized method of executions is constitutional.

Glass was electrocuted on June 12, 1987, at the age of twenty-five. His accomplice, Jimmy Wingo, was executed four days later, on June 16, 1987.

It was said that Glass was grinning as he was confined in the electric chair. His last words were "I'd rather be fishing".

Despite the failure of Glass v. Louisiana, electrocution has now been retired as a method of execution in most US states and except for South Carolina, none of the states retaining it uses it as their primary execution method as of 2025. Despite re-introducing the method in 2021, South Carolina has yet to conduct executions by electrocution since the state's last judicial electrocution in 2008.

== See also ==
- Capital punishment in Louisiana
- Capital punishment in the United States
- List of people executed in Louisiana
- List of people executed in the United States in 1987
