= Stephen Morin =

American serial killer

Steve Morin
- Born: Stephen Peter Morin; February 19, 1951; Providence, Rhode Island, U.S.
- Died: March 13, 1985 (aged 34); Huntsville Unit, Texas, U.S.
- Other names: Rich Clark; Rich Clarke; Robert Fred Generoso; Thomas David Hones; Ray Constantino (or Constantine)
- Status: Executed by lethal injection
- Convictions: Florida; Auto theft Texas; Capital murder (2 counts); Colorado; First degree murder Second degree kidnapping
- Penalty: Death

Details
- Victims: 4–48
- Span of crimes: November, 1969 – December 11, 1981
- Country: United States
- States: Nevada, Colorado, Texas (others suspected)
- Date apprehended: December 12, 1981

Stephen Peter Morin (February 19, 1951 – March 13, 1985) was an American serial killer who was suspected of being responsible for at least forty murders of young girls and women and seven men in the period from 1969 to 1981. Since Morin led a transient lifestyle and constantly moved around the country, the exact number of his victims is uncertain, but he is suspected of committing a total of 48 violent crimes across the United States. In the early 1980s, he was pursued by the federal authorities. Morin had created multiple aliases. These names included Rich Clark, Robert Fred Generoso, Thomas David Hones, and Ray Constantino or Constantine. The court found Morin sane and sentenced him to death by lethal injection. In 1985, he was executed by Texas after waiving his appeals.

== Early life ==
Little is known about Morin's childhood. He was born on February 19, 1951, in Providence, Rhode Island, into a poor family. He dropped out of school early, and in his teenage years, Morin began to use narcotics and delved into the criminal lifestyle.

In the mid-1960s, Morin was arrested in Florida for car theft. He was convicted and spent some time in an institution for juvenile delinquents, the Florida School for Boys, from which he escaped at age 14. Freed in 1968, Morin left Florida and wandered around the country. For the majority of the 1970s, he resided in Northern California, specifically in the San Francisco Bay Area, constantly changing his places of residence and using various pseudonyms while committing crimes. For some time, he lived in San Francisco, where he worked as a car mechanic and builder.

== Victims ==
On September 26, 1976, Morin tricked a 14-year-old girl into accompanying him to his Marina District apartment in San Francisco. Once there, he bound her, hung her from a ceiling hook, and raped and brutalized her for several hours. He released her in a Marin County shopping center. The FBI reported that Morin had been sought for interstate flight to avoid prosecution since 1977.

On September 25, 1979, Sheila Griffith, 22, was last seen leaving the Silver Nugget in Las Vegas with a man. Her body was found November 27, 1979, in the Mojave desert near the Nevada state line, covered by a sleeping bag.

On January 16, 1980, Susan Belote, 18, was reported missing when she failed to return to her Las Vegas home after a local shopping trip. Her body was found May 26, 1980, near Bloomington. Police said a large stone had been placed on top of the body. An autopsy performed on the badly decomposed body failed to positively establish the cause of death; however, the examiner said apparent damage inflicted on the victim's neck tissue led him to suspect the teenager was strangled.

On June 27, 1980, Cheryl Daniel, 20, was abducted from the Alpha Beta Supermarket parking lot in Las Vegas. Her body was found on December 13, 1980, in Hell Hole Canyon, near St George, with a gunshot wound to the head. On January 11, 1981, the Washington County sheriff issued a warrant charging Morin with kidnapping and murder in connection to the discovery of the bodies of Belote and Daniel.

On November 6, 1981, Morin, having just ended a date with Cindy Lee McDonald, picked up Sheila Whalen, 23. She was found stabbed to death in a room at the Mountain View Motel in Lakewood, Colorado, on November 7, 1981. Articles of clothing missing from Whalen's belongings were found by Morin's former girlfriend in his van, contributing to evidence that Morin killed Whalen after sexually assaulting her.

On November 30, 1981, Pamela Jackson, 23, was abducted from a Corpus Christi apartment complex while on her way to pick up her son. She survived 11 days with Morin before she was freed. During her captivity, Morin made her dye her hair brown from blonde. He sexually assaulted her and threatened to shoot her multiple times a day.

On December 2, 1981, Janna Bruce, 21, was abducted from the Hilton Inn parking lot a few minutes after she left the office where she worked as an executive secretary. She was found on December 3, 1981, floating in two feet of water in a culvert on Padre Island. An autopsy performed on her body showed Bruce had died of "asphyxiation as a result of ligature strangulation" caused by bindings tied around her face and neck. Fingerprints found on Bruce's 1979 Chevrolet Monza, found parked outside the Sands Motel, matched fingerprints taken of Morin while he awaited trial in the Bexar County jail.

On December 6, 1981, Michael Reed, 29, and Pearl Lutz, 26, were shot during an abduction attempt in San Antonio by Morin. Both survived.

On December 11, 1981, Morin shot Carrie Scott, 21, and Dru Valdes, 25, with a .38 caliber pistol outside a San Antonio restaurant while trying to steal Scott's car. Scott was shot in the back and died shortly after. Valdes was wounded.

== Arrest ==
On December 11, 1981, just hours following Scott's murder, the police SWAT team surrounded the Sands Motel in San Antonio. Police stormed Morin's motel room in an attempt to arrest him, but he evaded capture by escaping through a bathroom window. In the room was Morin's traveling companion, Sarah Clarke, 32, as well as Pamela Jackson, who had been abducted by Morin 11 days earlier.

On December 12, 1981, Morin crawled out of a bush in the parking lot of a K-Mart and approached Margaret Mayfield Palm, 30, and forced her at gunpoint to drive him to a Greyhound bus station in Kerrville in order to purchase a ticket to Austin. Through her religion, Palm convinced Morin to release her. Morin said that she had converted him to Christianity. Police were waiting for Morin when he arrived at the station and he was taken into custody and transported back to San Antonio.

On December 29, 1981, a $100,000 bond was set for Morin on the attempted capital murder charge of Dru Valdes, and he was ordered held without bond in the Bexar County jail for the capital murder charge of Carrie Scott.

== Trials ==
Morin was charged with the murders of Carrie Marie Scott and Janna Bruce, since there was substantial evidence supporting his guilt in those cases. After withdrawing his appeals and pleading guilty, he was convicted and sentenced to death in February 1984. Later on, he was additionally convicted of killing Daniel, before being extradited to Colorado on charges of killing Sheila Whalen, for whose killing he was also sentenced to death at the end of 1984. Morin was also supposed to be later extradited to Utah to stand trial for other killings he supposedly committed there, but for reasons unknown, this never occurred. In total, Stephen Morin was investigated for 48 violent murders committed in the states of Utah, Colorado, Nevada, Washington, Idaho, Indiana, Missouri, Pennsylvania, Texas, New York and California. In Nevada alone, Morin was tested for involvement in eight murders.

== Imprisonment ==
Morin's execution date was scheduled for March 1985. Shortly before this, the convicted stated that he did not want to appeal for a new trial or postpone the execution, which conflicted with his lawyer David Goldstein, who filed a petition for a forensic examination on his client, since he showed signs of intellectual disability. The application, however, was rejected.

== Execution ==
Morin was executed by lethal injection shortly after midnight on March 13, 1985, at the Huntsville Unit in Texas, in the presence of his victims' relatives and his girlfriend. On the day of his execution, for his last meal, Morin ordered steak, baked potatoes, butter, green pea salad, banana pudding and coffee. His final words were the following:

"Father, forgive these people for they know not what they do. Forgive them as you have forgiven me and I have forgiven them. Lord Jesus, I commit my soul to you."

Before his execution, Morin was described as being in a happy mood. Due to his history of drug abuse, the execution technicians were forced to probe both of Morin's arms and legs with needles for nearly 45 minutes before they found a suitable vein, a first-time occurrence at that time. He was pronounced dead at 12:55 AM, becoming the sixth man to be executed by lethal injection in Texas since the method was introduced in 1982.

== In popular culture ==
- Signs of a Serial Killer by Crystal Clary (ISBN 978-1491861387)
- The Eyes of a Stranger by Carrie Frederickson (ISBN 978-0741446213)
- Sarah's Story: Target of a Serial Killer by Sarah Lea Pisan (ISBN 1481729799)
- Obsession: Dark Desires: "Paging Sarah"
- Serial Thriller: "The Chameleon" on Investigation Discovery

== See also ==
- List of botched executions
- List of people executed in Texas, 1982–1989
- List of people executed in the United States in 1985
- List of serial killers in the United States
