= List of people executed in the United States in 1988 =

Eleven people, all male, were executed in the United States in 1988, seven by electrocution, and four by lethal injection.

== List of people executed in the United States in 1988 ==
No.	Date of execution	Name	Age of person			Gender	Ethnicity	State	Method	Ref.
No.	Date of execution	Name	At execution	At offense	Age difference	Gender	Ethnicity	State	Method	Ref.
1	January 7, 1988	Robert L. Streetman	27	22	5	Male	White	Texas	Lethal injection	
2	March 15, 1988	Willie Jasper Darden Jr.	54	40	14	Male	Black	Florida	Electrocution	
3	March 15, 1988	Wayne Robert Felde	38	29	9	Male	White	Louisiana	Electrocution	
4	April 13, 1988	Leslie Oliver Lowenfield	34	28	6	Male	Black	Louisiana	Electrocution	
5	April 14, 1988	Earl Clanton Jr.	33	25	8	Male	Black	Virginia	Electrocution	
6	June 10, 1988	Arthur Gary Bishop	35	27	8	Male	White	Utah	Lethal injection	
7	June 14, 1988	Edward Robert Byrne Jr.	28	24	4	Male	White	Louisiana	Electrocution	
8	July 28, 1988	James Norbon Messer Jr.	34	25	9	Male	White	Georgia	Electrocution	
9	November 3, 1988	Donald Gene Franklin	37	23	14	Male	Black	Texas	Lethal injection	
10	November 7, 1988	Jeffrey Joseph Daugherty	33	20	13	Male	White	Florida	Electrocution	
11	December 13, 1988	Raymond Landry Sr.	39	33	6	Male	Black	Texas	Lethal injection	
		Average:	36 years	27 years	9 years					

== Demographics ==
Gender
Male	11	100%
Female	0	0%
Ethnicity
White	6	55%
Black	5	45%
State
Louisiana	3	27%
Texas	3	27%
Florida	2	18%
Georgia	1	9%
Utah	1	9%
Virginia	1	9%
Method
Electrocution	7	64%
Lethal injection	4	36%
Month
January	1	9%
February	0	0%
March	2	18%
April	2	18%
May	0	0%
June	2	18%
July	1	9%
August	0	0%
September	0	0%
October	0	0%
November	2	18%
December	1	9%
Age
20–29	2	18%
30–39	8	73%
40–49	0	0%
50–59	1	9%
Total	11	100%

== Executions in recent years ==
Number of executions
1989	16
1988	11
1987	25
Total	52

Preceded by 1987	List of people executed in the United States in 1988	Succeeded by 1989
