= Lowenfield v. Phelps =

- Supreme Court of the United States

Argued October 14, 1987 Decided January 13, 1988
- Full case name: Lowenfield v. Phelps, Secretary, Louisiana Department of Corrections, et al.
- Citations: 484 U.S. 231 (more) 108 S. Ct. 546; 98 L. Ed. 2d 568; 1988 U.S. LEXIS 313; 56 U.S.L.W. 4071

Case history
- Prior: Habeas corpus petition denied, 671 F. Supp. 423 (E.D. La. 1987); affirmed, 817 F.2d 285 (5th Cir. 1987); stay of execution granted, 482 U.S. 932 (1987); cert. granted, 483 U.S. 1005 (1987).
- Subsequent: Rehearing denied, 485 U.S. 944 (1988).

Holding
- The aggravating factor making the crime punishable by death may be found in the definition of the crime itself as long it is enough narrow and precise.

Court membership
- Chief Justice William Rehnquist Associate Justices William J. Brennan Jr. · Byron White; Thurgood Marshall · Harry Blackmun; John P. Stevens · Sandra Day O'Connor; Antonin Scalia

Case opinions
- Majority: Rehnquist, joined by White, Blackmun, O'Connor, Scalia; Stevens (part III, except the last sentence)
- Dissent: Marshall, joined by Brennan; Stevens (part I)
- Kennedy took no part in the consideration or decision of the case.

Laws applied
- U.S. Const. amend. VIII

Lowenfield v. Phelps, 484 U.S. 231 (1988), is a United States Supreme Court case. The Court held that the two jury polls and the supplemental charge did not unlawfully pressure the jury to give a death sentence. The Court also stated that the death sentence does not violate the Eighth Amendment. This is simply because the single statutory "aggravating circumstance" found by the jury duplicates an element of the underlying offense of first-degree murder.

== Background ==
In 1984, Leslie Lowenfield, a Guyanese immigrant welder, was convicted of the 1982 killing of his girlfriend, a sheriff's deputy, and four members of her family, including a 4-year-old girl.

== Opinion of the court ==
The court, in an opinion by Chief Justice Rehnquist, held that the trial judge's polling of the jury and supplemental Allen instruction did not coerce the jury to return a verdict of guilty. The Court also rejected a challenge that Louisiana's death penalty statute did not sufficiently narrow the category of defendants who are eligible for the death penalty. The aggravating circumstance in the case, intentionally killing more than one person was found by the jury in the guilt phase after returning three first-degree murder verdicts.

== Subsequent developments ==
Lowenfield was executed by electric chair on April 13, 1988, at the age of 34.

== See also ==
- List of United States Supreme Court cases, volume 484
- List of United States Supreme Court cases
- Lists of United States Supreme Court cases by volume
- List of United States Supreme Court cases by the Rehnquist Court

General:

- Capital punishment in Louisiana
- Capital punishment in the United States
- List of people executed in Louisiana
- List of people executed in the United States in 1988
