= Eliseo Moreno =

American murderer (1959–1987)

- Born: Eliseo Hernandez Moreno; September 27, 1959; Hidalgo County, Texas, U.S.
- Died: March 4, 1987 (aged 27); Huntsville Unit, Texas, U.S.
- Occupation: Mechanic
- Status: Executed by lethal injection
- Convictions: Capital murder Murder (5 counts)
- Penalty: Death

Details
- Date: October 11, 1983
- Country: United States
- State: Texas
- Killed: 6
- Weapons: Two Smith & Wesson .357 Magnum revolvers (one of them stolen); .22-caliber revolver; .25-caliber pistol; 12-gauge Remington 870 pump-action shotgun (stolen)

Eliseo Hernandez Moreno (September 27, 1959 – March 4, 1987) was an American spree killer who killed six people in the Houston region of Texas on October 11, 1983. Moreno shot and killed his brother-in-law and his brother in-law's wife, a Texas Highway Patrol trooper, and three strangers before he was arrested. Moreno was found guilty of all six homicides and executed in 1987 for the murder of the police officer.

== Events ==
On October 11, 1983, Moreno, armed with a stainless-steel Smith & Wesson .357 Magnum revolver, was out searching for his estranged wife Blanca when he killed his brother-in-law, Juan Garza and his brother in law's wife Esther Garza in College Station before killing Texas Highway Patrol trooper Russell Lynn Boyd north of Hempstead; his blue-steel Smith & Wesson .357 Magnum revolver & Remington 870 12-gauge pump-action shotgun were stolen. In Hempstead itself, Moreno murdered three elderly people and took a family hostage from whom he was brought to Pasadena. Officers at a Wharton County roadblock arrested Moreno while he was driving towards the Rio Grande Valley with another hostage.

== Aftermath ==
Moreno was sentenced to death in 1984 for the murder of Boyd. In October 1985, he was sentenced to 45 years imprisonment for the murders of Juan Garza and Esther Garza, and an additional 35 years imprisonment for the murders of James Bennatte, Allie Wilkins, and Ann Benatt. He pleaded guilty to all charges and refused any appeals. On March 4, 1987, after only three years on death row, Moreno was executed at the Huntsville Unit via lethal injection.

== See also ==
- Capital punishment in Texas
- Capital punishment in the United States
- List of people executed in Texas, 1982–1989
- List of people executed in the United States in 1987
- List of rampage killers in the United States
- Volunteer (capital punishment)
