= List of people executed in the United States in 1989 =

Sixteen people, all male, were executed in the United States in 1989, eight by electrocution, seven by lethal injection, and one by gas chamber.

== List of people executed in the United States in 1989 ==
No.	Date of execution	Name	Age of person			Gender	Ethnicity	State	Method	Ref.
No.	Date of execution	Name	At execution	At offense	Age difference	Gender	Ethnicity	State	Method	Ref.
1	January 6, 1989	George C. Mercer	44	34	10	Male	White	Missouri	Lethal injection	
2	January 24, 1989	Theodore Robert Bundy	42	31	11	Male	White	Florida	Electrocution	
3	March 22, 1989	Leon Rutherford King	44	33	11	Male	Black	Texas	Lethal injection	
4	May 4, 1989	Aubrey Dennis Adams Jr.	31	20	11	Male	White	Florida	Electrocution	
5	May 18, 1989	Henry Willis III	36	23	13	Male	Black	Georgia	Electrocution	
6	May 24, 1989	Stephen Albert McCoy	40	32	8	Male	White	Texas	Lethal injection	
7	May 26, 1989	Michael Clarence Lindsey	28	21	7	Male	Black	Alabama	Electrocution	
8	June 19, 1989	William Paul Thompson	51	45	6	Male	White	Nevada	Lethal injection	
9	June 21, 1989	Leo Ernest Edwards Jr.	36	27	9	Male	Black	Mississippi	Gas chamber	
10	June 23, 1989	Sean Patrick Flanagan	28	26	2	Male	White	Nevada	Lethal injection	
11	July 14, 1989	Horace Franklin Dunkins Jr.	28	19	9	Male	Black	Alabama	Electrocution	
12	August 18, 1989	Herbert Lee Richardson	43	31	12	Male	Black	Alabama	Electrocution	
13	August 30, 1989	Alton Waye	34	22	12	Male	Black	Virginia	Electrocution	
14	September 20, 1989	James Emery Paster	44	35	9	Male	White	Texas	Lethal injection	
15	November 17, 1989	Arthur James Julius	43	31	12	Male	Black	Alabama	Electrocution	
16	December 7, 1989	Carlos DeLuna	27	20	7	Male	Hispanic	Texas	Lethal injection	
		Average:	37 years	28 years	9 years					

== Demographics ==
Gender
Male	16	100%
Female	0	0%
Ethnicity
Black	8	50%
White	7	44%
Hispanic	1	6%
State
Alabama	4	25%
Texas	4	25%
Florida	2	13%
Nevada	2	13%
Georgia	1	6%
Mississippi	1	6%
Missouri	1	6%
Virginia	1	6%
Method
Electrocution	8	50%
Lethal injection	7	44%
Gas chamber	1	6%
Month
January	2	13%
February	0	0%
March	1	6%
April	0	0%
May	4	25%
June	3	19%
July	1	6%
August	2	13%
September	1	6%
October	0	0%
November	1	6%
December	1	6%
Age
20–29	4	25%
30–39	4	25%
40–49	7	44%
50–59	1	6%
Total	16	100%

== Executions in recent years ==
Number of executions
1990	23
1989	16
1988	11
Total	50

Preceded by 1988	List of people executed in the United States in 1989	Succeeded by 1990
