= Victim: The Other Side of Murder =

1982 book by Gary Kinder

- Title page for, Victim: The Other Side of Murder (1982)
- Author: Gary Kinder
- Cover artist: Charles Rue Woods
- Language: English
- Genre: Sociology, True crime
- Publisher: Delacorte Press
- Publication date: 1982
- Publication place: United States
- Media type: Print (Paperback)
- Pages: 305
- ISBN: 0-385-29105-1

Victim: The Other Side of Murder (Delacorte Press, ISBN 0385291051) is a 1982 true crime book by Gary Kinder. The book is based on actual characters and events of the so-called "Hi-Fi murders" that took place on 22 April 1974, in Ogden, Utah.

== Summary ==
Victim: The Other Side of Murder recounts the events of the Hi-Fi murders. On 22 April 1974, Dale Selby Pierre and William Andrews entered the Hi-Fi Shop in Ogden, Utah, as Keith Roberts waited outside the shop in a car. Pierre, Andrews, and Roberts were all United States Air Force airmen stationed at Hill Air Force Base, just south of Ogden. During an armed robbery of the shop, Pierre and Andrews took five people hostage, killed three of them, and left the two who survived with horrific injuries. Meanwhile, Roberts had assisted Pierre and Andrews in the robbery of the shop's expensive stereo and electronics equipment.

The three murder victims were Stanley Walker (age 20), Michelle Ansley (age 18), and Carol Naisbitt (age 52). The two surviving victims were Cortney Naisbitt (age 16) and Orren Walker (age 43). Stanley Walker and Ansley were employees of the Hi-Fi Shop who were working at the time of the armed robbery. While the robbery was in progress, it was inadvertently interrupted on three separate occasions, with each occasion ensnaring an additional victim into the crime. On the first occasion, Cortney Naisbitt entered the shop in order to speak briefly with Stanley Walker. Sometime later, when Stanley Walker did not return home as expected, his father Orren Walker went to the Hi-Fi Shop to look for him. Similarly, Cortney Naisbitt's mother Carol later arrived at the shop to look for her son, who also had not returned home at the expected time. Each of the five victims was taken hostage, bound, forced to drink Drano, and later shot in the head. In addition, Ansley was raped by Pierre.

Victim: The Other Side of Murder focuses particularly on Cortney Naisbitt and the Naisbitt family. In the aftermath of the brutal crime, the Naisbitt family struggled not only with the death of murdered victim Carol, but with the physical and psychological recovery of surviving victim Cortney. This book was viewed by many as a pioneering work, because it was one of the first true crime books that focused on the victims of a violent crime rather than on the perpetrators.

== The process ==
Kinder took seven years to write the book. As he revealed in an interview published by Associated Press Writer Vern Anderson on 11 September 1982, in the Gainesville Sun, "A lot of the reason it took so long was I was a novice". A second reason it took so long, wrote Vern, "was a somewhat belated decision to focus his book on a survivor of the grisly Hi-Fi Shop murders rather than on the convicted killers."

Originally, Kinder had planned to write about Selby. Upon learning of this, Dr. Byron Naisbitt, Cortney's father, "summoned the writer to a face-to-face meeting, where Kinder convinced him of the need for victims of crime to tell their story. Naisbitt consented, and ultimately emerged as the book's central figure.

Also while writing the book, Kinder exchanged over 200 letters with Selby, visited him numerous times at Utah State Prison, and twice visited Selby's native Trinidad to research his background. However, the two fell out in 1980, when Kinder refused to sign over 10% of the book's proceeds to Selby. In contrast, Kinder told Dr. Naisbitt he wanted to set up a trust fund for Cortney, based on a percentage of the book and film rights.

== Victims ==
The crime resulted in the deaths of Stanley Walker, Ansley, and Carol Naisbitt. Cortney Naisbitt and Orren Walker survived, albeit with severe injuries.

- Michelle Ansley, age 19, an employee of the Hi-Fi Shop (raped and murdered)
- Byron Cortney Naisbitt, age 16, a patron of the Hi-Fi Shop (survived)
- Carol Naisbitt, age 52, mother of victim Cortney Naisbitt (murdered)
- Orren Walker, age 43, father of victim Stanley Walker (survived)
- Stanley Walker, age 20, an employee of the Hi-Fi Shop (murdered)

== Perpetrators ==
The crime was perpetrated by six men, but only three were identified and convicted. The three were United States Air Force airmen stationed at Hill Air Force Base.

- Dale Selby Pierre (executed by lethal injection on 28 August 1987)
- William Andrews (executed by lethal injection on 30 July 1992)
- Keith Roberts (imprisoned for armed robbery and paroled in 1987. Died by suicide by gunshot on 8 August 1992)

== Adaptation ==
The Hi-Fi murders was the basis for the 1991 CBS television movie Aftermath: A Test of Love, starring Richard Chamberlain and Michael Learned.

== See also ==
- 1982 in literature
- Capital punishment in Utah
