= David Dene Martin =

American convicted mass murderer executed in Louisiana

- Born: February 24, 1952; Waco, Texas, U.S.
- Died: January 4, 1985 (aged 32); Louisiana State Penitentiary, Louisiana, U.S.
- Status: Executed by electrocution
- Motive: Jealousy and rage
- Conviction: First degree murder (4 counts)
- Penalty: Death (April 24, 1978)

Details
- Victims: 4
- Date: August 14, 1977
- Location: Bayou Blue, Louisiana
- Imprisoned at: Louisiana State Penitentiary

David Dene Martin (February 24, 1952 – January 4, 1985) was an American mass murderer who was sentenced to death for the murders of four people in 1977. Martin, a former church youth counsellor, entered a trailer in Bayou Blue on August 14, 1977, shooting and killing his wife's lover and three other people. Martin was charged and found guilty of four counts of first degree murder. He was consequently sentenced to death and executed by the electric chair on January 4, 1985.

== Personal life ==
Born in Waco, Texas, on February 24, 1952, David Dene Martin relocated to Houma, Louisiana in 1973 after he got married. Martin worked as a church youth counselor and lead many social outreach programs, providing aid to troubled youth, monitoring a hotline and often playing folk songs. Apart from his counseling profession, Martin was also working various jobs to support himself, such as a maintenance man, carpenter and door-to-door salesman.

== 1977 Bayou Blue trailer shooting ==
On August 14, 1977, 25-year-old David Martin perpetuated a shooting that killed four people in Bayou Blue, Louisiana.

Days prior to the incident, Martin had discovered his wife, who was working at a bar, engaging in an affair with the bar owner, Bobby Todd. Martin planned to split up with his wife and murder Todd out of jealousy. Martin stole a .357 Magnum Colt Python from an ex-convict and told his next-door neighbor his plan .

Martin went to a trailer in Bayou Blue, where 33-year-old Todd, 27-year-old Terry Hebert, 19-year-old Anna Tierney, and 19-year-old Sandra Brake resided. Martin knocked and asked to speak to Todd and one of the victims let him in. Martin confronted Todd at gunpoint, and assuming that Martin was a robber, Todd handed him several rolls of money, but Martin still shot him twice in the chest, killing him. He proceeded to shoot Hebert, Tierney, and Brake several times, killing them as well. In total, Martin had fired 15 shots inside the trailer.

According to autopsy reports, Hebert was shot five times in the back and side, with two bullets penetrating his heart. Brake was shot twice in the heart and had defensive wounds on her wrist and arm. Tierney was struck by six bullets, once in the chest, four times in the abdomen, and once in the face.

== Murder trial and appeals ==
=== Trial ===
A day after the shooting, David Martin was arrested and charged with four counts of first degree murder.

Between April 3 and April 11, 1978, the trial of Martin took place before a Lafourche Parish jury for four counts of first-degree murder, and he was convicted of all charges by the end of his trial.

On April 24, 1978, David Martin was sentenced to death by the trial court upon the jury's unanimous recommendation for capital punishment.

=== Appeals ===
On October 8, 1979, the Louisiana Supreme Court dismissed Martin's direct appeal against his death sentence.

In 1980, the U.S. Supreme Court voted six to three to reject Martin's appeal.

On August 12, 1981, U.S. District Judge Jack Murphy Gordon turned down Martin's federal appeal against his death sentence.

On August 15, 1983, the 5th Circuit Court of Appeals rejected Martin's appeal. In this appeal, Martin's lawyers argued that Martin had committed the murders under the influence of drugs and alcohol, and it was additionally compounded by the emotional damage caused by his wife's affair and birth of his daughter who had a mental disability, but the court rejected it and found that the killings were all planned in advance and his conviction should stand.

On August 2, 1984, Martin's petition for a re-hearing of his appeal was also dismissed by the 5th Circuit Court of Appeals.

== First and second death warrants ==
In January 1981, a death warrant was approved for Martin, scheduling his upcoming execution date as February 13, 1981.

On February 9, 1981, the Louisiana Supreme Court rejected Martin's last-ditch appeal and refused to grant a stay of execution.

On February 10, 1981, two days before the scheduled execution of Martin, U.S. District Judge Jack Gordon allowed a federal appeal of Martin and granted him a temporary stay of execution, thus cancelling his first execution date. Apart from Martin's execution, another condemned inmate from Louisiana, Benjamin Berry, also had his execution date, which originally fell in the same month as Martin, cancelled due to a pending appeal.

Several months later, a second death warrant was issued, rescheduling the execution date as September 18, 1981. However, a federal appeal filed by Martin's lawyers led to a second stay of execution less than two weeks before the new date of execution.

== Execution ==
Four years after he was nearly executed, David Martin's third death warrant was issued, rescheduling his execution to take place on January 4, 1985. In fact, prior to the scheduled execution of Martin, there were six more convicts on Louisiana's death row who were executed within a span of 13 months since late 1983, sparking concerns over the increased rate of executions in Louisiana.

On December 27, 1984, it was reported that Martin would appear before the state's parole board for a clemency hearing on January 3, 1985. Martin's lawyers and family members sought mercy from the parole board on account of the difficulties he faced in his life up until the murders, including his wife's infidelity and financial problems, and continued to assert that the influence of drugs and alcohol caused him to kill the victims, which were out of character. In the end, the Louisiana Pardon Board refused the clemency petition of Martin on January 3, 1985, hours before the scheduled execution of Martin.

On January 4, 1985, 32-year-old David Dene Martin was put to death by the electric chair at the Louisiana State Penitentiary. For his last meal, Martin did not make a special request, but was given a meal set of sloppy joes and French fries. He also declined to make a final statement before his death sentence was carried out.

On the date of the execution, some individuals mounted a public protest to show support for the death penalty and Martin's execution, and they were the family members of Faith Hathaway, who was murdered by serial killer Robert Lee Willie (who was executed eight days before Martin). At the same time, about 20 death penalty opponents held a one-hour vigil outside the governor's mansion to protest against the execution.

Martin was the 33rd person to be executed in the United States after the nationwide resumption of capital punishment since 1976. Martin was additionally the seventh convict to be executed in Louisiana since 1983, the year when Louisiana resumed the use of capital punishment and conducted its first execution. For the following two years after Martin was executed, the state of Louisiana did not carry out another execution due to legal challenges, until Benjamin Berry, who was convicted of the murder of a police officer, was put to death on June 7, 1987.

== See also ==
- Capital punishment in Louisiana
- List of people executed in Louisiana
- List of people executed in the United States in 1985
