= List of people executed in the United States in 1987 =

Twenty-five people, all male, were executed in the United States in 1987, sixteen by electrocution, seven by lethal injection, and two by gas chamber.

== List of people executed in the United States in 1987 ==
No.	Date of execution	Name	Age of person			Gender	Ethnicity	State	Method	Ref.
No.	Date of execution	Name	At execution	At offense	Age difference	Gender	Ethnicity	State	Method	Ref.
1	January 30, 1987	Ramon Pedro Hernandez	44	38	6	Male	Hispanic	Texas	Lethal injection	
2	March 4, 1987	Eliseo Hernandez Moreno	27	24	3	Male	Hispanic	Texas	Lethal injection	
3	May 15, 1987	Joseph Holcombe Mulligan	35	22	13	Male	Black	Georgia	Electrocution	
4	May 20, 1987	Edward Earl Johnson	26	18	8	Male	Black	Mississippi	Gas chamber	
5	May 22, 1987	Richard Tucker Jr.	44	35	9	Male	Black	Georgia	Electrocution	
6	May 28, 1987	Anthony Charles Williams	27	18	9	Male	Black	Texas	Lethal injection	
7	May 29, 1987	William Boyd Tucker	31	21	10	Male	White	Georgia	Electrocution	
8	June 7, 1987	Benjamin A. Berry	31	22	9	Male	White	Louisiana	Electrocution	
9	June 9, 1987	Alvin Rudolph Moore Jr.	27	20	7	Male	Black	Louisiana	Electrocution	
10	June 12, 1987	Jimmy L. Glass	25	20	5	Male	White	Louisiana	Electrocution	
11	June 16, 1987	Jimmy Charles Wingo	35	30	5	Male	White	Louisiana	Electrocution	
12	June 24, 1987	Elliot Rod Johnson	28	23	5	Male	Black	Texas	Lethal injection	
13	July 6, 1987	Richard Lee Whitley	41	34	7	Male	White	Virginia	Electrocution	
14	July 8, 1987	John Russell Thompson	32	22	10	Male	White	Texas	Lethal injection	
15	July 8, 1987	Connie Ray Evans	27	21	6	Male	Black	Mississippi	Gas chamber	
16	July 20, 1987	Willie Lawrence Celestine	30	24	6	Male	Black	Louisiana	Electrocution	
17	July 24, 1987	Willie Watson Jr.	31	25	6	Male	Black	Louisiana	Electrocution	
18	July 30, 1987	John E. Brogdon	25	19	6	Male	White	Louisiana	Electrocution	
19	August 24, 1987	Sterling Richard Rault Jr.	36	30	6	Male	White	Louisiana	Electrocution	
20	August 28, 1987	Beauford James White	41	28	13	Male	Black	Florida	Electrocution	
21	August 28, 1987	Wayne Eugene Ritter	33	22	11	Male	White	Alabama	Electrocution	
22	August 28, 1987	Dale Selby Pierre	34	21	13	Male	Black	Utah	Lethal injection	
23	September 1, 1987	William Mitchell	35	22	13	Male	Black	Georgia	Electrocution	
24	September 10, 1987	Joseph Blaine Starvaggi	34	24	10	Male	White	Texas	Lethal injection	
25	September 21, 1987	Timothy Wesley McCorquodale	35	21	14	Male	White	Georgia	Electrocution	
		Average:	33 years	24 years	8 years					

== Demographics ==
Gender
Male	25	100%
Female	0	0%
Ethnicity
Black	12	48%
White	11	44%
Hispanic	2	8%
State
Louisiana	8	32%
Texas	6	24%
Georgia	5	20%
Mississippi	2	8%
Alabama	1	4%
Florida	1	4%
Utah	1	4%
Virginia	1	4%
Method
Electrocution	16	64%
Lethal injection	7	28%
Gas chamber	2	8%
Month
January	1	4%
February	0	0%
March	1	4%
April	0	0%
May	5	20%
June	5	20%
July	6	24%
August	4	16%
September	3	12%
October	0	0%
November	0	0%
December	0	0%
Age
20–29	8	32%
30–39	13	52%
40–49	4	16%
Total	25	100%

== Executions in recent years ==
Number of executions
1988	11
1987	25
1986	18
Total	54

Preceded by 1986	List of people executed in the United States in 1987	Succeeded by 1988
