= James Paster and Stephen McCoy =

Executed American serial killers

James Paster
- Paster's mugshot
- Born: January 30, 1945; Hamilton County, Ohio, U.S.
- Died: September 20, 1989 (aged 44); Huntsville Unit, Texas, U.S.
- Status: Executed by lethal injection
- Conviction: Capital murder
- Penalty: Death (September 22, 1983)
- Accomplices: Stephen A. McCoy; Gary L. LeBlanc

Details
- Victims: 3–5
- Span of crimes: 1980–1981
- Country: United States
- State: Texas

Stephen McCoy
- Born: December 17, 1948; Harris County, Texas, U.S.
- Died: May 24, 1989 (aged 40); Huntsville Unit, Texas, U.S.
- Status: Executed by lethal injection
- Conviction: Capital murder
- Penalty: Death (July 27, 1984)
- Accomplices: James Emery Paster; Gary L. LeBlanc

Details
- Victims: 3
- Span of crimes: 1980–1981
- Country: United States
- State: Texas

James Emery Paster (January 30, 1945 – September 20, 1989) and Stephen Albert McCoy (December 17, 1948 – May 24, 1989) were American serial killers who murdered at least three people in Texas between 1980 and 1981. Both were sentenced to death and executed at the Huntsville Unit in Huntsville, Texas, via lethal injection. Prior to Paster's execution, he confessed to two other murders in the Houston area, but he was never tried for either of these killings. McCoy was executed in May 1989, in what was considered a botched execution. Paster was executed in September 1989.

== Murders ==
In October 1980, Paster, McCoy, and an acquaintance, Gary LeBlanc, agreed to murder 38-year-old Robert Edward Howard in Houston. Paster was hired by Howard's ex-wife Trudy and her new husband Eddie LeBlanc, who promised him US$1,000 and a motorcycle in exchange for the killing. On October 25, 1980, Paster, accompanied by McCoy and LeBlanc, drove to a nightclub in Houston and slashed the tires of Howard's truck. When Howard returned to his vehicle, Paster approached him from behind and fatally shot him in the back of the head before fleeing.

In November 1980, the same trio abducted 27-year-old Diana Trevino Oliver and forced her into their vehicle. She was taken to a field where she was raped and then fatally stabbed by McCoy.

On December 31, 1980, 18-year-old Cynthia Darlene Johnson was found stranded by the side of the road by the trio. She was taken to a warehouse where the men raped her. LeBlanc then attempted to kill her by strangling her to death; however, his attempt at killing her failed. Paster then killed her in the early hours of January 1, 1981, by successfully strangling her to death. He then drove a nail up her nose to ensure she was dead.

== Trials ==
In 1982, Paster received three life sentences in Alabama for unrelated crimes: robbery-assault, robbery in the first degree, and burglary in the first degree. On June 1, 1983, while serving his sentences at Holman Correctional Facility in Alabama, he was indicted for the capital murder of Robert Howard in Houston. Police interviewed Paster at the prison, where they tape-recorded his confession to the murder.

On September 21, 1983, Paster was found guilty of capital murder and was sentenced to death the following day for murdering Howard. McCoy, who at the time of the revelation was serving a five-year sentence in a Texas prison for burglary, was found guilty of capital murder and rape. He was indicted on April 19, 1983, and was found guilty of capital murder on July 26, 1984. He was sentenced to death the following day for murdering Johnson.

LeBlanc was also found guilty for his role in the murders and was sentenced to thirty-five years in prison. He received a lighter sentence in exchange for his testimony against Paster and McCoy. Trudy and Eddie LeBlanc were both also convicted of murder for their part in the murder of Howard and each received life sentences.

== Executions ==
In April 1989, Paster and fellow death row inmate Noble Mays Jr. attempted to escape from prison by squeezing through an air vent and sawing through an exhaust fan. The attempt was unsuccessful after they were caught in a pipe corridor, and they were returned to death row.

On May 24, 1989, McCoy was executed via lethal injection at the Huntsville Unit in Huntsville, Texas, for the rape and murder of Cynthia Johnson. His execution was considered botched. Witnesses reported that his chest started to heave as the execution began. He also gasped, choked, and then arched his back from the gurney, as the drugs from the lethal injection took effect. One of the witnesses fainted during the execution and reportedly knocked over another witness. The Texas Attorney General, Jim Mattox, later admitted that McCoy "seemed to have a somewhat stronger reaction," and that "The drugs might have been administered in a heavier dose or more rapidly." McCoy's last meal was a cheeseburger, french fries, and a strawberry milkshake. He made no final statement.

On September 20, 1989, Paster was executed via lethal injection at the Huntsville Unit for the capital murder of Robert Howard. Prior to his execution, Paster confessed to murdering two other women in the Houston area, but he was never tried for either of the two killings. Paster's last meal consisted of steak, salad, French fried potatoes, and watermelon.

They are both buried at Captain Joe Byrd Cemetery.

== See also ==
- Capital punishment in Texas
- Capital punishment in the United States
- List of botched executions
- List of people executed in Texas, 1982–1989
- List of people executed in the United States in 1989
- List of serial killers in the United States
