= Willie Darden =

American convicted murderer (1933-1988)

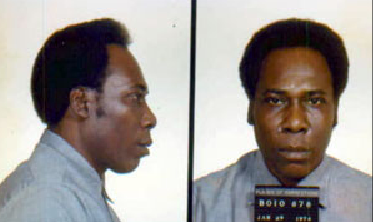
- Florida Department of Corrections mugshot
- Born: Willie Jasper Darden Jr. June 4, 1933; Greene County, North Carolina, U.S.
- Died: March 15, 1988 (aged 54); Florida State Prison, Florida, U.S.
- Status: Executed by electrocution
- Convictions: First degree murder Assault with intent to rape Robbery
- Penalty: Death

Details
- Victims: 1
- Date: September 8, 1973

Willie Jasper Darden Jr. (June 4, 1933 – March 15, 1988) was an American man who was executed in Florida for murder during the course of a robbery. Darden's case was notable because of the 14 years that he spent on death row between his death sentence and his execution, which, at the time, was longer than the time any other inmate in the United States had spent on death row prior to their execution. He was also notable for the number of protests and amount of controversy and attention that his case attracted worldwide, as well as the unusually large number of death warrants that he lived through prior to his execution.

== Early life ==
Willie Darden was born in Greene County, North Carolina on June 4, 1933. His family lived in poverty as Darden grew up. His father was an auto-mechanic, and his great-grandfather had been an enslaved man who was also born in Greene County. Darden's mother was 15 years old at the time of his birth, and two years after he was born, she died while giving birth to another child. Because of his family's poverty, Darden could not attend school regularly and instead worked in the farms, eventually dropping out of school after completing the eighth grade.

When Darden was a teenager, he started breaking the law, starting after he was caught stealing from a mailbox. Upon his first violation of the law at the age of 16, Darden was sent to a juvenile detention facility. After being discharged, Darden had trouble finding work and was eventually rearrested for cashing a bad check. He received a 4-year sentence in prison for the bad check. Until the murder in 1973, Darden was repeatedly in and out of prison for a variety of crimes, including assault, forgery, theft, and attempted rape. At the time of the murder, Darden was on furlough from prison while serving 20 years in a Florida prison for attempting to rape a 70-year-old woman in 1968.

== Crime and trial ==
On September 8, 1973, at a time police estimated to be between 6:00 and 6:30 p.m., there was a robbery of a Carl's Furniture Store, located in Lakeland, Florida. During the robbery, 54-year-old James Carl Turman and his 16-year-old neighbor Phillip Arnold were shot. Arnold survived the shooting, but Turman died. The robber also attempted to rape Turman's wife prior to shooting and murdering Turman.

Darden was arrested later that day for a traffic violation. While he was in jail for the traffic violation, investigators tied Darden to the murder of Turman as well as a string of similar robberies and assaults in the area. Subsequently, Darden was charged with murder and robbery.

Darden, who was black, had an all-white jury at his trial, which took place in January 1974. The state had intentionally excluded black people from serving on the jury, a practice that was later declared unconstitutional in 1986, and a U.S. Supreme Court Justice, Harry Blackmun, would later declare that the jury selection in Darden's case was improper and violated his constitutional rights. Additionally, according to trial records, the prosecutor in Darden's trial, C. Ray McDaniel, made racially charged remarks, including quoting the defense counsel in calling Darden an "animal" that needed to be "chained up" and expressing a desire to see Darden "sitting here with no face, blown away by a shotgun."

Three witnesses to Turman's murder — Turman's wife, Phillip Arnold, and another neighbor — all identified Darden as the murderer. None of them were ever asked to identify Darden in a police lineup, but they identified him in court, although Turman's wife had difficulty identifying Darden and Phillip Arnold described the killer as being larger than Darden was. Darden's lawyers did not challenge the eyewitnesses at the trial. A woman named Christine Bass claimed that Darden had been at her house during the time that the murder was committed, from 4:00 to 5:30 p.m., saying that Darden had needed to use her phone to call for help. Darden's defense attorneys never called her to testify. Additionally, years after the trial, the victim's minister gave an affidavit claiming that he was called to the crime scene and arrived at 5:55 p.m., which meant that the crime would have happened prior to the time that the police said it had. Both the victim's minister and Bass gave affidavits that would have helped Darden with constructing his alibi.

Nevertheless, on January 23, 1974, Willie Darden was convicted of the murder and robbery of James Carl Turman. The jury recommended the death penalty, and he was sentenced to death. He was received on death row at the Florida State Prison on January 29, 1974.

== Death row, appeals, and execution ==
During Darden's time on death row, hundreds of people worldwide protested his death sentence, including Pope John Paul II, Soviet dissident Andrei Sakharov, the human rights organization Amnesty International (who started a petition that gathered 10,000 signatures from people in the Netherlands who were opposed to Darden's execution), and the Reverend Jesse Jackson, who called Darden's death sentence "another example that injustice is still alive and well and that equal opportunity is still denied black Americans even in death." In addition, Margot Kidder and Peter Gabriel advocated for a commutation of Darden's sentence; newly elected Florida governor Bob Martinez, who ended up signing Darden's final death warrant, received over 1,600 phone calls on Darden's behalf. Two months before his execution, Darden appeared on an episode of 20/20 on ABC and an episode of West 57th on CBS.

In 1979, Florida governor Bob Graham signed Darden's first death warrant. Darden had his first execution date set for Wednesday, May 23, 1979, on the same day as fellow death row inmate John Spenkelink. The execution was planned to be a double execution, and he and Spenkelink would have been the first inmates in the United States since 1967 to have been put to death without forgoing all appeals and volunteering for execution. However, at the time that the warrant was signed, Darden still had multiple appeals pending. As a result, 14 hours before Darden was scheduled to be executed on May 23, he received a federal stay of execution. Spenkelink would go on to be executed two days later, on May 25, 1979.

At the time of his execution, Darden had been on death row for 14 years, longer than any other condemned inmate in the United States at the time. He had also lived through six separate death warrants, including the one that scheduled his execution for May 23, 1979. Another death warrant scheduled Darden's execution for September 2, 1985, and even though the U.S. Supreme Court rejected his request for a stay of execution that evening, they later agreed to grant Darden a petition for writ of certiorari six hours before he was scheduled to be electrocuted. Overall, six times, Darden received stays of execution prior to the scheduled execution. However, Governor Martinez signed Darden's seventh death warrant in early 1988. This warrant would eventually lead to Darden's execution.

Willie Darden was executed in Florida's electric chair on March 15, 1988. He was strapped to the execution chair at 7:07 AM and pronounced dead at 7:12 a.m. Following his execution, the victim's widow told the Associated Press, "I think [the execution was] long overdue. He did it to himself. I'm just thinking right now I want some peace of mind. It's been a long time and I'm glad it's finally over."

== Citations in popular culture ==
The Italian rock band Litfiba used Darden's photo on the cover of their album Litfiba 3 in 1988; the track "Louisiana" was inspired by his case.

English singer/songwriter Nik Kershaw was inspired to write the song Elisabeth's Eyes from his 1989 album The Works by Darden's correspondence with Essex schoolteacher Elisabeth Allen.

== See also ==
- List of people executed in Florida
- List of people executed in the United States in 1988

Executions carried out in Florida
Preceded by Beauford White August 28, 1987	Willie Darden; March 15, 1988	Succeeded by Jeffrey Daugherty November 7, 1988
Executions carried out in the United States
Preceded by Robert L. Streetman – Texas January 7, 1988	Willie Darden – Florida; March 15, 1988	Succeeded by Wayne Robert Felde – Louisiana March 15, 1988
