= List of people executed in Texas, 1982–1989 =

The following is a list of people executed by the U.S. state of Texas between 1982 (when the state resumed executions) to 1989. All of the 33 people during this period were convicted of murder and have been executed by lethal injection at the Huntsville Unit in Huntsville, Texas.

== Executions 1982–89 ==
The number in the "#" column indicates the nth person executed since 1982 (when Texas resumed the death penalty). Thus, Charles Brooks Jr. was not only the first person executed in the 1980 decade, he was also the first person executed since Texas resumed the death penalty.

1982 – 1 execution
#	Executed person	Ethnicity	Age	Sex	Date of execution	County	Victim(s)	Governor
1	Charles Brooks Jr.	Black	40	M	07-Dec-1982	Tarrant	David Gregory	Bill Clements
1984 – 3 executions
2	James David Autry	White	29	M	14-Mar-1984	Jefferson	Shirley Drouet and Joe Broussard	Mark White
3	Ronald Clark O'Bryan	White	39	M	31-Mar-1984	Harris	Timothy O'Bryan	Mark White
4	Thomas Andy Barefoot	White	39	M	30-Oct-1984	Bell	Harker Heights police officer Carl Irving LeVin	Mark White
1985 – 6 executions								Mark White
5	Doyle Edward Skillern	White	49	M	16-Jan-1985	Lubbock (Note: On a change of venue from Live Oak.)	TDPS narcotics agent Patrick Randel	Mark White
6	Stephen Peter Morin	White	34	M	13-Mar-1985	Jefferson	Carrie Marie Scott and Janna Bruce (Note: Morin was also sentenced to death for the murder of Shiela Whalen in Colorado.)	Mark White
7	Jesse De La Rosa	Hispanic	24	M	15-May-1985	Bexar	Masaoud Ghazali	Mark White
8	Charles Milton	Black	34	M	25-Jun-1985	Tarrant	Manaree Denton	Mark White
9	Henry Martinez Porter	Hispanic	43	M	09-Jul-1985	Tarrant	Fort Worth police officer Henry Mailloux	Mark White
10	Charles Francis Rumbaugh	White	28	M	11-Sep-1985	Potter	Michael Fiorello	Mark White
1986 – 10 executions								Mark White
11	Charles William Bass	White	30	M	12-Mar-1986	Harris	Houston City Marshall Charles Baker	Mark White
12	Jeffery Allen Barney	White	28	M	16-Apr-1986	Harris	Ruby Mae Longsworth	Mark White
13	Jay Kelly Pinkerton	White	24	M	15-May-1986	Nueces	Sarah Donn Lawrence	Mark White
14	Rudy Ramos Esquivel	Hispanic	50	M	09-Jun-1986	Harris	Houston police officer Timothy Hearn	Mark White
15	Kenneth Albert Brock	White	37	M	19-Jun-1986	Harris	Michael Sedita	Mark White
16	Randy Lynn Woolls	White	36	M	20-Aug-1986	Tom Green	Betty Stotts	Mark White
17	Larry Smith	Black	30	M	22-Aug-1986	Dallas	Mike Mason	Mark White
18	Chester Lee Wicker	White	37	M	26-Aug-1986	Galveston	Suzanne Knuth	Mark White
19	Michael Wayne Evans	Black	30	M	04-Dec-1986	Dallas	Elvira Guerrero and Mario Garza	Mark White
20	Richard Andrade	Hispanic	25	M	18-Dec-1986	Nueces	Cordelia Mae Guevara	Mark White
1987 – 6 executions
21	Ramon Pedro Hernandez	Hispanic	44	M	30-Jan-1987	El Paso	Oscar Martin Frayre	Bill Clements
22	Eliseo Hernandez Moreno	Hispanic	27	M	04-Mar-1987	Fort Bend	6 murder victims (Note: The 6 victims were: TDPS trooper Russell Lynn Boyd, Juan Garza, Esther Garza, Ann Bennatt, Allie Wilkins and James Bennatt. Moreno was executed for Boyd's murder.)	Bill Clements
23	Anthony Charles Williams	Black	27	M	28-May-1987	Harris	Vickie Lynn Wright	Bill Clements
24	Elliot Rod Johnson	Black	38	M	24-Jun-1987	Jefferson	Joseph Granado and Arturo Melendez	Bill Clements
25	John Russell Thompson	White	32	M	08-Jul-1987	Bexar	Mary Knuepper	Bill Clements
26	Joseph Blaine Starvaggi	White	34	M	10-Sep-1987	Montgomery	John Denson	Bill Clements
1988 – 3 executions								Bill Clements
27	Robert L. Streetman	White	27	M	07-Jan-1988	Hardin	Christine Baker	Bill Clements
28	Donald Gene Franklin	Black	37	M	03-Nov-1988	Nueces (Note: On a change of venue from Bexar.)	Mary Margaret Moran	Bill Clements
29	Raymond Landry Sr.	Black	39	M	13-Dec-1988	Harris	Kosmas Prittis	Bill Clements
1989 – 4 executions								Bill Clements
30	Leon Rutherford King	Black	44	M	22-Mar-1989	Harris	Michael Underwood	Bill Clements
31	Stephen Albert McCoy	White	40	M	24-May-1989	Harris	Cynthia Johnson	Bill Clements
32	James Emery Paster	White	44	M	20-Sep-1989	Harris	Robert Howard (Note: Paster was also convicted of murdering Cynthia Johnson.)	Bill Clements
33	Carlos DeLuna	Hispanic	27	M	07-Dec-1989	Nueces	Wanda Jean Lopez	Bill Clements
Sources: List of executed offenders by the TDJC since 1982, and The Espy File: 1608–2002.

Preceded by List of people executed in Texas, 1960–1964	Lists of people executed in Texas	Succeeded by List of people executed in Texas, 1990–1999

== See also ==
- Capital punishment in Texas
