= List of people executed in the United States in 1985 =

Eighteen people, all male, were executed in the United States in 1985, eleven by electrocution, and seven by lethal injection. Charles Rumbaugh became the first of 22 juvenile offenders to be executed in the United States in the modern era before the Supreme Court banned capital punishment for juvenile offenders under Roper v. Simmons in 2005.

== List of people executed in the United States in 1985 ==
No.	Date of execution	Name	Age of person			Gender	Ethnicity	State	Method	Ref.
No.	Date of execution	Name	At execution	At offense	Age difference	Gender	Ethnicity	State	Method	Ref.
1	January 4, 1985	David Dene Martin	32	25	7	Male	White	Louisiana	Electrocution	
2	January 9, 1985	Roosevelt Green Jr.	28	20	8	Male	Black	Georgia	Electrocution	
3	January 11, 1985	Joseph Carl Shaw	29	22	7	Male	White	South Carolina	Electrocution	
4	January 16, 1985	Doyle Edward Skillern	48	38	10	Male	White	Texas	Lethal injection	
5	January 30, 1985	James David Raulerson	34	25	9	Male	White	Florida	Electrocution	
6	February 20, 1985	Van Roosevelt Solomon	41	35	6	Male	Black	Georgia	Electrocution	
7	March 6, 1985	Johnny Paul Witt	42	30	12	Male	White	Florida	Electrocution	
8	March 13, 1985	Stephen Peter Morin	34	30	4	Male	White	Texas	Lethal injection	
9	March 20, 1985	John C. Young	28	18	10	Male	Black	Georgia	Electrocution	
10	April 18, 1985	James Dyral Briley Jr.	28	23	5	Male	Black	Virginia	Electrocution	
11	May 15, 1985	Jesse Sandoval De La Rosa	24	18	6	Male	Hispanic	Texas	Lethal injection	
12	May 29, 1985	Marvin Francois	39	31	8	Male	Black	Florida	Electrocution	
13	June 25, 1985	Charles Milton	34	26	8	Male	Black	Texas	Lethal injection	
14	June 25, 1985	Morris Odell Mason	31	24	7	Male	Black	Virginia	Electrocution	
15	July 9, 1985	Henry Martinez Porter	43	33	10	Male	Hispanic	Texas	Lethal injection	
16	September 11, 1985	Charles Francis Rumbaugh	28	17	11	Male	White	Texas	Lethal injection	
17	October 16, 1985	William Earl Vandiver	37	34	3	Male	White	Indiana	Electrocution	
18	December 6, 1985	Carroll Edward Cole	47	39	8	Male	White	Nevada	Lethal injection	
		Average:	35 years	27 years	8 years					

== Demographics ==
Gender
Male	18	100%
Female	0	0%
Ethnicity
White	9	50%
Black	7	39%
Hispanic	2	11%
State
Texas	6	33%
Florida	3	17%
Georgia	3	17%
Virginia	2	11%
Indiana	1	6%
Louisiana	1	6%
Nevada	1	6%
South Carolina	1	6%
Method
Electrocution	11	61%
Lethal injection	7	39%
Month
January	5	28%
February	1	6%
March	3	17%
April	1	6%
May	2	11%
June	2	11%
July	1	6%
August	0	0%
September	1	6%
October	1	6%
November	0	0%
December	1	6%
Age
20–29	6	33%
30–39	7	39%
40–49	5	28%
Total	18	100%

== Executions in recent years ==
Number of executions
1986	18
1985	18
1984	21
Total	57

Preceded by 1984	List of people executed in the United States in 1985	Succeeded by 1986
