= Hi-Fi murders =

1974 crimes in Ogden, Utah

Coordinates: 41°13′28.57″N 111°58′14.51″W

- The deceased victims: Stanley Walker, Sherry Michelle Ansley, and Carol Naisbitt (stated as Mrs. Byron Naisbitt, using her husband's name)
- Location: Ogden, Utah, United States
- Date: April 22, 1974
- Attack type: Robbery, rape, torture, murder, mass shooting
- Weapons: .25 caliber and .38 caliber handguns, ballpoint pen, Drano
- Deaths: 3
- Injuries: 2
- Perpetrators: Dale Selby Pierre; William Andrews; Keith Roberts; Three unknown men

The Hi-Fi murders were the torture of five people resulting in three deaths during a robbery at the Hi-Fi Shop, a home audio store in Ogden, Utah, United States, on the evening of April 22, 1974. Several men entered the Hi-Fi Shop shortly before closing time and began taking hostages. They forced their victims to drink corrosive drain cleaner, which the perpetrators believed would fatally poison their hostages, but instead caused burns to their mouths and throats. Further violence included kicking a pen into an ear and the brutal rape of an eighteen-year-old woman, before three of the victims were fatally shot. The two surviving victims were left with life-changing injuries.

Police only had enough evidence to convict three enlisted United States Air Force airmen: Dale Selby Pierre, William Andrews, and Keith Roberts; the three others involved were never caught. Pierre and Andrews were both sentenced to death and executed for murder and aggravated robbery, while Roberts, who had remained in a getaway vehicle, was merely convicted of robbery. The crime became notorious for its extreme violence and later accusations of racial bias in the Utah judiciary.

== Robbery ==
On April 22, 1974, Dale Selby Pierre, William Andrews, Keith Roberts, and three other men drove in two vans to the Hi-Fi Shop at 2323 Washington Boulevard, Ogden, just before closing time. Four of the group entered the shop brandishing handguns, while Roberts and another man remained with the vehicles. Two employees, Stanley Walker, aged 20, and Sherry Michelle Ansley, aged 18, were in the store at the time and were taken hostage. Pierre and Andrews took the two into the store's basement and bound them. The gang then began robbing the store.

Approximately an hour into the robbery, a 16-year-old boy, Cortney Naisbitt, who dropped by to thank Walker for allowing him to park his car in the store's parking lot earlier that day as he ran an errand next door, was also taken hostage and tied up in the basement with Walker and Ansley. Later that evening, Orren Walker, Stanley Walker's 43-year-old father, became worried that his son had not returned home and went to the store. Cortney Naisbitt's mother, Carol Peterson Naisbitt, also arrived at the shop later that evening looking for her son, who was late getting home. Both Orren Walker and Carol Naisbitt were taken to the basement and tied up. This brought the total number of hostages to five.

== Torture, rape, and murders ==
With five people now held hostage in the basement, Pierre told Andrews to get something from their van. Andrews returned with a bottle in a brown paper bag, from which Pierre poured a cup of Drano-brand drain cleaner. Pierre ordered Orren Walker to administer it to the other hostages, but he refused, and was bound, gagged, and left face-down on the basement floor.

Pierre and Andrews then propped the hostages into sitting positions and forced them to drink the Drano, telling them it was vodka laced with sleeping pills. It immediately caused blisters on the victims' lips, burnt their tongues and throats, and peeled the flesh around their mouths. Ansley, still begging for her life, was forced to drink the Drano, although Orren Walker said she coughed less than the other victims. Pierre and Andrews tried to duct-tape the hostages' mouths shut to hold quantities of drain cleaner in and to silence their screams, but the oozing blisters prevented the adhesive from sticking. Orren Walker was the last to be given the Drano, but seeing what was happening to the other hostages, allowed it to pour out of his mouth and then mimicked the convulsions and screams of his son and other hostages.

Pierre became angry because the deaths were taking too long, and were too loud and messy, so he shot Carol and Cortney Naisbitt in the backs of their heads, killing Carol but leaving Cortney alive. Pierre then shot at Orren Walker but missed. He fatally shot Stanley Walker before again shooting at Orren, this time grazing the back of his head.

Pierre took Ansley to the far corner of the basement, forced her at gunpoint to remove her clothes, then repeatedly raped her after telling Andrews to leave for 30 minutes. Afterwards, he allowed her to use the bathroom while he watched, then dragged her, still naked, back to the other hostages, threw her on her face, and fatally shot her in the back of the head. According to Orren Walker's testimony, her last words were "I am too young to die."

Andrews and Pierre noted that Orren Walker was still alive, so Pierre mounted him, wrapped a wire around his throat, and tried to strangle him. When this failed, Pierre and Andrews inserted a ballpoint pen into Walker's ear. Pierre stomped it until it punctured his eardrum, broke, and exited his throat. Pierre and Andrews went upstairs, finished loading equipment into their van, and left.

== Victims ==
The victims included the following five individuals, three of whom were murdered. Each of the victims were bound, forced to drink liquid Drano, and were later shot. Two individuals survived their injuries.

- Sherry Michelle Ansley (January 24, 1956 – April 22, 1974): Sherry Ansley, age 18, was an employee at the Hi-Fi Shop. She had been hired only a week before the murders. She had recently become engaged and planned to be married on August 5, 1974. Ansley was raped and shot dead by Pierre.
- Byron Cortney Naisbitt (September 25, 1957 – June 4, 2002): Byron Naisbitt, age 16, was a student at Ogden High School. Although he survived his injuries, he suffered from amnesia and was thus unable to testify at trial. Naisbitt was able to return to school more than a year after the incident, and he graduated with his class at the high school in 1976. Due to the brain damage from his head wound, however, he was forced to drop out of college. As he could not hold down a job, he had to apply for Social Security assistance. On November 15, 1985, Naisbitt married Catherine Hunter. (Byron's mother, Carol, was a fatality in the murder and her husband, Byron Naisbitt, later remarried.) He suffered chronic pain for the rest of his life and died on June 4, 2002, aged 44.
- Carol Elaine Naisbitt (née Peterson) (December 25, 1921 – April 22, 1974): Carol Naisbitt, age 52, was the mother of victim Byron Cortney Naisbitt. She died at the hospital after being shot by Pierre.
- Orren William Walker (September 17, 1930 – February 13, 2000): Orren Walker, age 43, was the father of victim Stanley Walker. Having survived the attack, he testified at trial against the perpetrators. He died on February 13, 2000, aged 69.
- Stanley Orren Walker (March 19, 1954 – April 22, 1974): Stanley Walker, age 20, was an employee at the Hi-Fi Shop. He was shot dead by Pierre.

== Arrests ==
The bodies were discovered almost three hours later, when Orren's wife and other son came to the store looking for them. Orren's son heard noises coming from the basement and broke down the back door, while Mrs. Walker called the Ogden police. Stanley Walker and Ansley were already dead; Carol Naisbitt was taken by ambulance to St. Benedict's Hospital (now St. Benedict's Manor) but was pronounced dead on arrival. Cortney, although not expected to live, survived with severe and irreparable brain damage; he was hospitalized for 266 days before being released. Orren Walker survived with extensive burns to his mouth and chin, as well as the damage to his ear caused by the pen.

In spite of his injuries, Orren was able to give a description of the two leading robbers, with that of the man who fired the killing shots on the other victims, a short-statured, bespectacled black male with a Caribbean accent, later being identified as Dale Pierre.

Hours after news of the crime broke, an anonymous Air Force employee called the Ogden police and told them that Andrews had confided to him months earlier, "One of these days I'm going to rob that Hi-Fi shop, and if anybody gets in the way, I'm going to kill them." Hours later, two teenage boys dumpster diving at Hill Air Force Base, near the barracks Pierre and Andrews were living in, contacted the police after discovering the victims' wallets and purses, recognizing their pictures from the drivers' licenses.

Detective Deloy White, who responded to the scene, believing the killers might be in the crowd, put on a show for the gathered airmen. Speaking dramatically, he waved each piece of evidence in the air with tongs as he removed it from the dumpster. Later, he noted that most of the service personnel who gathered around the dumpster stood still and watched in relative silence, with the exception of two men, later identified as Pierre and Andrews, who paced around the crowd, speaking loudly and making frantic gestures with their hands. The detective later received an award from the Utah branch of the Justice Department for his use of proactive techniques.

Based on the two men's reactions to the evidence being removed from the trash bin, Andrews and Pierre were taken in for questioning. A search warrant was then issued for their barracks. Police found fliers for the Hi-Fi Shop and a rental contract for a unit at a public storage facility. Following the issuance of another search warrant, stereo equipment taken from the Hi-Fi Shop, later identified via serial numbers, was recovered from the storage unit. Also recovered was the half-empty bottle of Drano. A few weeks later, a third airman, Keith Roberts, was taken into custody after he was identified through questioning on the base as a participant in the robbery.

== Trial ==
Pierre, Andrews, and Roberts were charged with first degree murder and aggravated robbery.

The joint trial of Pierre, Andrews, and Roberts for first degree murder and robbery began on October 15, 1974, in Farmington, in neighboring Davis County. On November 16, 1974, Pierre and Andrews were convicted of all charges; Roberts was convicted only of robbery. Four days later, Pierre and Andrews were sentenced to death. Roberts was sentenced to five years to life imprisonment and was paroled in 1987.

During the trial, it was revealed that Pierre and Andrews had robbed the store with the intent of killing anyone they encountered, and, in the months prior, had been looking for ways to commit the murders quietly and cleanly. The two then repeatedly watched the film Magnum Force (1973), in which a prostitute (played by Margaret Avery) is forced to drink Drano and is shown immediately dropping dead. Pierre and Andrews decided that this would be an efficient method of murder and decided to use it in their crime.

Survivor Orren Walker was the star witness for the prosecution. Due to his amnesia, Cortney Naisbitt was unable to testify. His father, Byron Hunter Naisbitt, did testify.

== Convictions ==
The official police report stated that six men driving two vans committed the robbery. Roberts and another man remained with the cars, and two others loaded the vans, while Pierre and Andrews tortured and killed the victims. However, detectives only had enough evidence to convict Pierre, Andrews, and Roberts. Ogden Police Department Officer Deloy White, who was a detective when he worked the case, observed: "Andrews was the brains behind the whole deal, the one who organized it [...] Pierre was the enforcer." Andrews would corroborate White's statement in an interview with KUTV before his execution in 1992, admitting that he targeted the store after becoming acquainted with Stanley Walker a few months prior to the robbery and blaming solely Pierre for the excessive violence leading up to the killings.

=== Dale Selby Pierre ===
Pierre one week before his execution

Pierre was 21 years old at the time of the crime. He was born on January 21, 1953, near Mason Hall, Tobago, and moved to Brooklyn, New York, at the age of 17. In May 1973, Pierre entered active service with the United States Air Force and in September 1973 was transferred to Hill Air Force Base, as a helicopter mechanic. Almost on arrival, Pierre became the prime suspect in the October 5, 1973, murder of Edward Jefferson, an Air Force Sergeant at Hill Air Force Base, although police lacked enough evidence to file charges. At the time of the Hi-Fi murders, Pierre was out on bail for car theft from a Salt Lake City car dealer.

On November 16, 1974, Pierre was convicted of three counts of first degree murder and two counts of aggravated robbery for the Hi-Fi crimes. On November 20, 1974, he was given three death sentences, one for each of the murder victims. While in prison, Pierre changed his name 27 times, reportedly to protect his family name from notoriety, finally settling on "Pierre Dale Selby" (transposing his first, middle, and last names from birth) as his legal name. At his clemency hearing, he said he had a strict upbringing and was a changed man. After being denied clemency, Pierre was executed by lethal injection on August 28, 1987, at the age of 34. At the time of his death, Pierre bequeathed all of his money ($29, or $82 in 2026 dollars) to Andrews. Pierre declined a last meal, instead spending his final day fasting, praying, singing hymns and reading the Bible. His last words were "Thank you, I’m just going to say my prayers." The Deseret News reports that Pierre said, to no one in particular, moments before his execution: "I'll be glad when this is over."

At his clemency hearing, Pierre said, "The crime took a course of its own. It wasn’t planned that way. People kept coming in and I just panicked. The only way to prevent what happened was to have been moved away from the Air Force entirely… Of course the alcohol and the pills I was consuming didn’t help—valiums, reds, black beauties and yellow jackets. Everyone has a limit beyond which they won’t go—drugs, etc., can alter that limit. I tell myself, 'You have to accept responsibility for it—you did it, you were there. You can’t rationalize it'." However, Andrews said he never saw him drunk or using drugs.

Orren Walker testified during the clemency hearing. He called Pierre a sadist and said he deserved to die, saying, "After he shot Mrs. Naisbitt first, then he was kind of prancing or walking in a manner that I got the impression he was kind of enjoying what he was doing. This has been hard for me. It’s hard for me to believe that I was ever involved with this. My son Stanley’s life was taken with two shots and Drano. He tried five different times to kill me. Each one could have been lethal. It certainly has changed our lives." Walker said that his younger son, traumatized by his older brother's murder, slept on a mattress in his parents' bedroom and refused to go into the basement of the house. "Most of my wife’s time is spent in bed trying to forget," Walker said.

=== William A. Andrews ===
Andrews shortly before his execution

Andrews was 19 years old at the time of the crime and, like Pierre, was a helicopter mechanic at Hill Air Force Base. He was born in Jonesboro, Louisiana in 1955 and was previously stationed in Dallas.

During the trial, it was revealed that he and Pierre had the intention of killing anyone they came across while robbing the store. On November 16, 1974, Andrews was convicted of three counts of first degree murder and two counts of aggravated robbery for the Hi-Fi crimes. Andrews' death conviction was considered especially controversial, because he did not directly kill any of the victims, although he did admit to forcefully administering Drano down their throats. On November 20, 1974, he was given three death sentences, one for each of the murder victims. The date was set to August 22, 1989, but he was given repeated stays of execution by the 10th Circuit Court of Appeals.

Pierre and Andrews became notoriously hated prisoners at Utah State Prison, and were particularly reviled on death row. In 1977, convicted murderer Gary Gilmore reportedly remarked, "I'll see you in Hell, Pierre and Andrews!", as he passed their cells on the way to his execution by firing squad. However, the Deseret News reported that Gilmore's parting words to the Hi-Fi killers, moments before his execution were: "Adios, Pierre and Andrews. I'll be seeing you directly."

Andrews was executed by lethal injection at 1:30 a.m. on July 30, 1992, at the age of 37, after 18 years on death row. His last meal was a banana split, which he shared with his niece and sister. Andrews' last words, spoken to deputy corrections director Bruce Egan, were: "Thank those who tried so hard to keep me alive. I hope they continue to fight for equal justice after I'm gone. Tell my family goodbye and I love them." After being strapped onto the gurney at 1:35 a.m., Andrews lifted his head and said "I love you. Bye bye." to his sister, just before the injections were administered. He was declared dead at 1:46 a.m.

=== Keith Leon Roberts ===
Roberts in 1974

Roberts was 19 years old at the time of the crime. He was born on January 5, 1954, in Lawton, Oklahoma and had a wife and an infant son at the time of his arrest. He initially denied being part of the robbery, but admitted during his trial that he acted as a getaway driver, under the impression that no one else would be in the store. Although Roberts claimed that he only met Andrews the day of the robbery, witnesses stated that they had spotted Roberts a few days earlier repeatedly driving around a different stereo shop in Ogden. The prosecution also stated that Roberts had been seen pacing back and forth in front of the Hi-Fi store around the same time the killings occurred, despite his insistence that he stayed in one of the vans for the duration of the robbery. Roberts was acquitted of murder after the court found that he had no role in nor knowledge of the murders. He was, however, convicted of two counts of aggravated robbery and sentenced to 5 years to life.

Roberts was paroled on May 12, 1987, after nearly 13 years in prison, and moved to Chandler, Oklahoma, to live with relatives and was reported as working for an Oklahoma City electronic store in 1989. He died by suicide on August 8, 1992, barely a week after Andrews's execution, by fatally shooting himself.

== Appeals and aftermath ==
Following the handing down of death sentences to the defendants, the NAACP and Amnesty International campaigned to commute Pierre and Andrews' death sentences. The NAACP demanded that Pierre and Andrews' death sentences should be revoked because of racial bias at the trial. They noted that the defendants were both black, and the victims and jury were all white. According to Amnesty International, the sole black member of the jury pool was stricken peremptorily by the prosecution during jury selection; however, it was revealed that the juror was dismissed because he was a law-enforcement officer who personally knew "just about everyone tied to the case."

Andrews also accused the judicial system of racism following the NAACP's request for reduced sentences. A letter from a representative of Pope John Paul II, signed by 40 members of clergy from Utah, also asked for clemency for Andrews; the Church of Jesus Christ of Latter-day Saints did not endorse the request.

After Pierre's execution, a petition for a stay of Andrews' execution was submitted to the Inter-American Commission on Human Rights. The Inter-American Commission petition alleged that a hand-written note, "hang the niggers," had been found in the jury area during a recess, and that the judge had refused a request for a mistrial and a right to question jurors concerning the note. The fate of the physical note itself is unknown. The jury had been sequestered and were transported daily to "Lee's Cafe" in Bountiful, Utah. During lunch, one of the jurors discovered the words written on a napkin in the dining area where they had been repeatedly seated. Despite these appeals, both death sentences were upheld. In December 1996, the Inter-American Commission found that the United States had violated its international obligations by denying William Andrews a trial free from racial discrimination.

== Legacy ==
- FBI trainees at the FBI Academy at Quantico, Virginia, are taught about the case. It was included as a sample case in the FBI's Crime Classification Manual.
- The experiences of Cortney Naisbitt and his family became the basis for Gary Kinder's book Victim: The Other Side of Murder (1982).
- The Hi-Fi murders were the basis for the CBS television movie Aftermath: A Test of Love (1991), starring Richard Chamberlain and Michael Learned.

== See also ==
- Pearcy murders
- Capital punishment in Utah
- Crime in Utah
- List of mass shootings in the United States (1900–1999)
- List of people executed in Utah
- List of people executed in the United States in 1987
- List of people executed in the United States in 1992

== Bibliography ==
- Gillespie, L. Kay (1997). The Unforgiven: Utah's Executed Men. Signature Books. ISBN 978-1-56085-098-4.
- Kinder, Gary (1982). Victim: The Other Side of Murder. Delacorte Press. ISBN 978-0-385-29105-7.

Executions carried out in Utah
| Preceded by Gary Mark Gilmore January 17, 1977 | Dale Selby Pierre; August 28, 1987 | Succeeded by Arthur Gary Bishop June 10, 1988 |
Executions carried out in the United States
| Preceded by Wayne Eugene Ritter – Alabama August 28, 1987 | Dale Selby Pierre – Utah; August 28, 1987 | Succeeded by William Mitchell – Georgia September 1, 1987 |
Executions carried out in Utah
| Preceded by Arthur Gary Bishop June 10, 1988 | William D. Andrews; July 30, 1992 | Succeeded by John Albert Taylor January 26, 1996 |
Executions carried out in the United States
| Preceded by Edward B. Fitzgerald Sr. – Virginia July 23, 1992 | William D. Andrews – Utah; July 30, 1992 | Succeeded by Curtis Lee Johnson – Texas August 11, 1992 |
