= Murder of Mary Margaret Moran =

1975 kidnapping, rape and murder of a nurse in San Antonio, Texas

Mary Margaret Moran
- Born: Mary Margaret Crawford; February 10, 1948; Cincinnati, Ohio, U.S.
- Died: July 31, 1975 (aged 27); San Antonio, Texas, U.S.
- Cause of death: Fatal stab wounds
- Resting place: Highland Cemetery, Fort Mitchell, Kentucky, U.S.
- Other name: Peggy Moran
- Known for: Victim of a kidnapping, rape, and murder case

The murder of Mary Margaret Moran (alias Peggy Moran; February 10, 1948 – July 31, 1975) occurred on July 26, 1975, in San Antonio, Texas. Moran, a nurse working at the San Antonio Veterans Administration Hospital, was kidnapped from the parking lot of her workplace and she was raped and stabbed by her abductor, Donald Gene Franklin (September 21, 1951 – November 3, 1988). Moran was left for dead throughout the next four days before her nude body was found by a passer-by on July 30, 1975.

Moran, who was still alive but mortally wounded at the time of her discovery, died in hospital the next day due to her wounds. Franklin, who was also a suspect behind the 1974 rape and strangulation death of another woman, was charged with capital murder after his arrest for Moran's death. Franklin was found guilty of capital murder and sentenced to death, and executed by lethal injection on November 3, 1988.

== Abduction and murder ==
Shortly after midnight on July 26, 1975, 27-year-old Mary Margaret "Peggy" Moran, a nurse working at the San Antonio Veterans Administration Hospital in San Antonio, Texas, was attacked and kidnapped by a man while she was walking to her car in the hospital's outpatient parking lot. The kidnapper, 23-year-old Donald Gene Franklin, forcibly took Moran to an overgrown field several miles from the hospital.

Two men, James Carter and Jerry Galvan, witnessed events surrounding Moran’s kidnapping. Carter, a hospital employee, saw Franklin near a green Buick in the parking lot, holding a strap or hose and asking about a gas station. Suspecting suspicious activity, Carter alerted Galvan, a hospital security officer. Galvan later spotted the Buick driven by Franklin and noticed Moran’s car missing and empty. When Galvan tried to approach, Franklin sped off. Though Galvan lost him after a brief chase, he got a clear look at Franklin and noted the license plate number. After the chase, Galvan returned to the parking lot and discovered a trail of blood leading from Moran’s vehicle in the direction of where Carter had first seen Franklin and the green Buick. Laboratory analysis later confirmed that the blood was human and matched the blood type of the victim, Mary Margaret Moran.

Meanwhile, Franklin took Moran to the overgrown field, where he raped Moran and stabbed her seven times. Moran, who was mortally wounded, was left for dead at the vacant area by Franklin, who drove back home. However, by dawn, Franklin was located by police, who had traced the car registration number to Franklin's stepfather, who was the one selling the Buick to Franklin prior to the abduction. Franklin was arrested as a suspect behind Moran's disappearance, and the authorities undertook a massive search for Moran, whose whereabouts which Franklin had refused to divulge. the search went on for the next four days without any results, and the police speculated that it was unlikely Moran was still alive at that time.

Four days after Moran's abduction, a passer-by discovered Moran lying naked on top of a fire ant mound. At the time she was found, Moran was still alive but in weak condition, due to her stab wounds and the effects of exposure. The discovery was hailed as a "miracle" by searchers and medical professionals, and one doctor cited that Moran's will to live was the primary reason behind her survival. Moran was subsequently taken to the hospital, but she died a day later on July 31, 1975. According to doctors, Moran suffered from dehydration and pneumonia, in addition to a collapsed lung and losing about two-thirds to three quarters of her blood. It was also stated that should Moran be found a day earlier than the date she was discovered, she would have been able to survive. The official cause of death was the combination of lethal loss of blood, multiple stab wounds, dehydration, infection and pneumonia. Reportedly, about 300 people attended Moran's funeral a day after she died.

When the police conducted a search at Franklin's house, they discovered bloodstained clothing, fibers matching the victim’s sweater, and personal belongings of Mary Margaret Moran, some partially burned and stained with blood. A knife consistent with her wounds was also found. In the Buick, police uncovered blood matching Moran’s type, a rope, a semen stain, and hairs matching hers. Soil from under the car matched the area where her body was found, and the rear door handles had been removed to prevent escape. This evidence directly linked Franklin to Moran's abduction and murder.

== Donald Gene Franklin ==
=== Background and charges ===
Donald Gene Franklin
- Born: September 21, 1951; Stanton, Texas, U.S.
- Died: November 3, 1988 (aged 37); Huntsville Unit, Texas, U.S.
- Cause of death: Execution by lethal injection
- Status: Executed
- Motive: Rape
- Conviction: Capital murder
- Penalty: Death (March 8, 1976)

Details
- Victims: 1–2
- Date: July 26, 1975
- Locations: San Antonio, Texas
- Imprisoned at: Ellis Unit

Born on September 21, 1951, Donald Gene Franklin was born and raised in Stanton, Texas, a small town near Odessa. He was the eldest of nine children in a farming family. During his early years, the family relocated to Hereford, a rural community in the Texas Panhandle. Franklin reportedly left school around the age of nine and later began working as a farm laborer by the time he was 15. In 1968, Franklin and his family moved to San Antonio. He held several short-term jobs, including work as a busboy at a local truck stop and as an assistant cabinet maker in an East Side workshop. In 1970, following a 1969 offense, Franklin pleaded guilty to a charge of rape and was sentenced to a five-to-ten-year prison term. He served approximately four years before being released in 1974, with probation extending into early 1975. After his release, Franklin found employment as a janitor at a social work agency on the East Side of San Antonio. Franklin was married and his wife was pregnant as of May 1975, two months before he murdered Mary Moran.

Murder of Cynthia Kettinger

Prior to the murder of Mary Margaret Moran, Franklin was allegedly involved in the rape and murder of Cynthia Kettinger, which occurred on November 13, 1974, in San Antonio. The 19-year-old victim was last seen being abducted by a man, who was described to be African-American, and later found raped and strangled to death in the back seat of an automobile parked in the Young Women's Christian Association (YWCA) parking lot across the street from the newspaper where she worked in the advertising department. In the immediate aftermath, the police offered a reward for the capture of Kettinger's murderer, who was also suspected to be involved in several unsolved rape cases in the area, and over 30 African-American men were probed as possible suspects in the case, but the case was not solved.

Ultimately, Franklin was identified as the alleged murderer seen abducting Kettinger before her murder. The murder of Moran, in comparison, shared several distinct similarities with the murder of Kettinger, which led to police establishing a connection between Franklin and Kettinger.

Capital murder and rape charges

After his arrest, Franklin was first charged with capital murder in the 1974 rape and murder of Cynthia Kettinger, and this offence itself carries either the death penalty or life imprisonment under Texas state law. The district attorney Ted Butler officially announced that he would seek the death penalty for Franklin on this crime. A charge of attempted murder was pending to be filed against Franklin.

Upon the death of Moran on July 31, 1975, a second charge of capital murder was also filed against Franklin for Moran's killing, and a second death sentence was also sought by the prosecution against Franklin for murdering Moran. Apart from this, Moran was also linked to a 1974 rape of a 16-year-old girl, who was attacked by Franklin in December 1974. As a result of the murder and rape charges levied against him, Franklin was held in solitary confinement while pending trial for the above offences he was accused of. He was formally indicted by a grand jury from San Antonio for these cases, and also scheduled to be placed in five further police line-ups to trace his possible connections to several more unsolved crimes in San Antonio.

=== Franklin's murder trials ===
In August 1975, Franklin was scheduled to stand trial on January 12, 1976 for the murder of Moran. He was not tried for the killing of Kettinger.

On March 7, 1976, Franklin was found guilty of capital murder by a Corpus Christi jury.

On March 8, 1976, Franklin was sentenced to death upon the jury's unanimous recommendation for capital punishment.

However, as a result of varied trial errors, Franklin was eventually subjected to two re-trials for the murder of Moran, with the higher courts overturning his death sentence and murder conviction twice. During his second murder trial, Franklin was once again sentenced to death by a Houston jury. For his third trial, Franklin's case was granted a change of venue to Brownsville, where he was sentenced to death for the third time.

== Appeals ==
On May 24, 1978, the Texas Court of Criminal Appeals dismissed Donald Franklin's direct appeal against his death sentence.

On June 26, 1985, the Texas Court of Criminal Appeals rejected another appeal from Franklin, after he was sentenced to death for the third time.

On February 24, 1986, the U.S. Supreme Court upheld the death sentence of Franklin and dismissed his appeal.

On July 30, 1987, Franklin's appeal was denied by the 5th Circuit Court of Appeals.

On June 22, 1988, the U.S. Supreme Court rejected Franklin's final appeal, while at the same time upholding the constitutionality of the death penalty in Texas.

== Execution of Franklin ==
Originally, Donald Franklin was scheduled to be executed on December 16, 1985, but it was stayed due to legal issues.

The execution date was later re-scheduled on September 16, 1986, but it was postponed once again. A new date of execution was scheduled on October 2, 1987, but a fourth stay of execution was granted two days before it was to be conducted.

On November 3, 1988, 37-year-old Donald Gene Franklin was put to death by lethal injection at the Huntsville Unit. He requested no witnesses for his execution, but met with his parents about seven hours prior. He was pronounced dead at 12:30 a.m. He made no final statement when asked. Franklin was the second person in Texas to be executed during the year of 1988. His last meal consisted of a hamburger and french fries.

== See also ==
- Capital punishment in the United States
- Capital punishment in Texas
- List of people executed in the United States in 1988
- List of people executed in Texas, 1982–1989
