= David Funchess =

American Vietnam War veteran executed for murder (1947–1986)

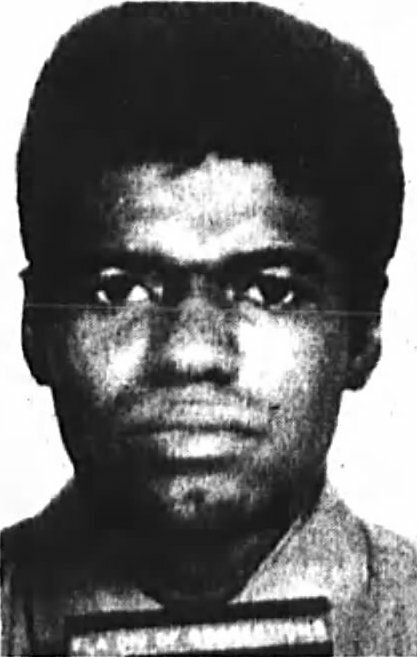
- A mugshot of Funchess taken c. 1975, while he was on death row in Florida State Prison
- Born: March 16, 1947; Jacksonville, Florida, U.S.
- Died: April 22, 1986 (aged 39); Florida State Prison, Florida, U.S.
- Occupations: War veteran; lounge bar employee
- Known for: First veteran of the Vietnam War to be executed in the United States
- Status: Executed by electrocution
- Conviction: First degree murder (2 counts)
- Penalty: Death

Details
- Victims: 3
- Date: December 16, 1974 approx. 9:15 am
- Location: Jacksonville, Florida
- Weapons: grapefruit knife liquor bottle
- Date apprehended: February 7, 1975

David Livingston Funchess (March 16, 1947 – April 22, 1986) was an American war veteran, self-confessed war criminal, and convicted murderer who was executed by the state of Florida. Funchess was convicted of and sentenced to death for the 1974 murders of 52-year-old Anna Waldrop and 56-year-old Clayton Keaton Ragan during a robbery of his former workplace. Funchess also severely injured 62-year-old Bertha McLeod, who died of her injuries in 1977; however, Funchess never went to trial or received a conviction in McLeod's murder. He was sentenced to death in 1975 – and resentenced to death in 1979 – for Waldrop and Ragan's murders.

Funchess's case gained significant press coverage and controversy because he was a Vietnam War veteran who was diagnosed with an extreme case of post-traumatic stress disorder (PTSD) as a result of his service. At the time of the murders, the disorder was not fully recognized; the American Psychiatric Association added PTSD to the third edition of the Diagnostic and Statistical Manual of Mental Disorders (DSM-III) in 1980, several years after Funchess was sentenced to death. Funchess was diagnosed with the disorder in 1982. Courts and Florida Governor Bob Graham repeatedly denied Funchess's clemency requests due to him and his legal team not having brought up PTSD as a mitigating factor at the time of his 1975 trial. These decisions prompted criticism from Funchess's defense attorneys, war veterans, and anti-death penalty activists, who argued that his PTSD diminished his culpability in the murders and that his sacrifice on behalf of the country's military should have earned him clemency, and that Funchess could not have brought up PTSD during his trial as it was not recognized in the DSM-III at the time.

However, federal appellate court found Funchess's lawyers to be at fault since they had been aware of the PTSD diagnosis since 1982, but failed to raise it as an issue in either of their two subsequent petitions for federal habeas corpus relief for Funchess.

Funchess's execution made him the first Vietnam War veteran to be executed in the United States.

== Early life and Vietnam War ==
Funchess was born on March 16, 1947, in Jacksonville, Florida, to Alice and Venis (or Wenis) Funchess, the latter of whom operated tractors for a fertilizer plant. David Funchess had at least two older siblings, Mary and Willie J. Funchess; Willie was 2 years old at the time of David Funchess's birth. Overall, he had at least two sisters and four brothers.

Funchess's appellate team, consisting of attorneys and anti-death penalty activists including Mark Olive, Michael Mello, and Scharlette Holdman, gathered statements from people who knew Funchess before he served in the Vietnam War, including multiple close childhood friends, a Baptist minister who had attended middle school with Funchess, and a high school biology teacher, all of whom described Funchess as "a quiet, intelligent, and caring person who was in no way headed toward a life of crime," who had never used illicit drugs prior to his service. The appellate team also revealed that Funchess was a victim of child abuse who grew up in poverty during the Jim Crow era in Florida; his sister Mary told his appellate team, "When most children got spankings when they misbehaved, we got "killings." We would have been glad to have been hit with just a hand or a belt, but it was usually with fists, sticks, extension cords or a piece of water hose. Often we didn't even know why we were being hit."

In 1965, Funchess graduated near the top of his class in high school. In 1967, he enlisted in the United States Marine Corps; that summer, he and his unit, the 3rd Marine Division, were sent to serve in the Vietnam War, near the Laotian border, during one of the war's most intense periods of combat. At the time of his enlistment, Funchess had no criminal record.

=== Vietnam War experiences ===
During Funchess's time in Vietnam, he was exposed to Agent Orange, a toxic herbicide, defoliant, and chemical agent linked to physical and neurological problems in veterans and their offspring. While on death row, Funchess told his sister that he had very few memories of his time in Vietnam but could remember watching a fellow Marine being decapitated by a missile, having his own body blown into the air by the force of a mortar explosion, and being ordered to shoot a pajama-clad elderly man who was too physically disabled to escape:

"He would describe women, children, and wrinkled old men, all harmless people that he was told to kill because they were 'the enemy.' He told me about one old man who had pajamas. He could hardly walk, much less run. He was totally harmless. He couldn't have done anything to anyone, but David had to shoot him down in cold blood."

Two and a half months into his service, Funchess received severe injuries to his ankle and leg from stepping on a land mine. A medical report described that he was medically evacuated to a naval hospital in Japan for three months and subsequently sent to a naval hospital in Virginia, where he was housed in a psychiatric ward with a diagnosis of "Psychoneurotic Depressive Reaction," a precursor to post-traumatic stress disorder.

Sometime during Funchess's service, one of his brothers was murdered. He was given leave to attend his brother's funeral, but he did not return to duty at the scheduled time, causing him to be briefly listed as absent without leave (AWOL). This designation was lifted after he returned to combat. Following his hospital stay in Virginia, Funchess was again required to report back to active duty in January 1968, but he did not, leading to him again being listed as AWOL. His second designation as AWOL led to his dishonorable discharge, precluding him from receiving benefits from the United States Department of Veterans Affairs. However, he received a Purple Heart due to his wounds. He also received the Vietnam Service Medal and the Republic of Vietnam Campaign Medal.

=== Post-war behavior ===
After returning from the war, Funchess was put on pain medicine to cope with his injuries, which led to him developing a heroin addiction. Funchess's family members said that he underwent "strange" behavioral changes and that he would dig foxholes under his mother's house and sleep in them at night; he also began locking himself in his bedroom for multiple days at a time. Two of his sisters described his post-Vietnam temperament as "shellshocked." One sister, Queenie, described incidents wherein Funchess would "go blank" and become unresponsive for several minutes at a time in the middle of conversations, and that she would hear him crying in his room at night. He also disclosed to her that he had recurring nightmares involving the unarmed Vietnamese civilians whom he had been ordered to kill. At a press conference protesting Funchess's upcoming execution, Jeff Thompson, a Vietnam War veteran and lawyer who represented Funchess prior to his execution, said Funchess's behavior demonstrated that he, like many war veterans, could not readjust to civilian life. He also described Funchess's case of PTSD as "extreme."

In 1972, a man held Funchess at gunpoint. Funchess, who was unarmed, walked towards the man, unaffected. The man shot him several times in the stomach. Funchess survived the shooting. Witnesses to the crime believed Funchess exhibited a desire to die by suicide.

Around September 1973, Funchess was arrested for and convicted of breaching of the peace and grand larceny. On separate occasions, he was arrested for loitering, obstructing traffic, public intoxication, and other crimes, although whether or not he was convicted of any of those crimes is unclear. His family posited that his inability to keep a job, coupled with his drug addiction and trauma, led him to "[drift] into vagrancy and petty crime." He also started neglecting his hygiene, failing to bathe regularly or tend to his hair or clothes.

== Murders ==
=== Background ===
Approximately a year prior to the murders, Funchess worked as a porter at the Avondale Liquor Store, a lounge in Jacksonville, Florida. He was fired after his employers suspected him of stealing $800 USD.

Anna Waldrop, who was 52 years old, had worked at the lounge for seven years at the time of the murders; 62-year-old Bertha McLeod had worked at the lounge for years as well and told a friend that she was considering retiring soon. She was on vacation, and the last day of her vacation was the Monday on which the murders were committed, but she decided to go to work that day. Clayton Ragan, who was 56 years old, was a customer at the lounge who was actually from Live Oak, Florida; he was visiting Jacksonville to see his children.

=== Crime ===
Sometime before 9:15 am on Monday, December 16, 1974, Funchess entered the lounge and encountered Waldrop, McLeod, and Ragan. He beat and stabbed all three of them on various parts of their bodies; he also slashed all three of their throats. Police later found a bloodstained grapefruit knife, which they believed Funchess used to carry out the murders. He stole between $5,500 and $6,500 USD from the bar, mostly in canceled checks, before leaving.

When police arrived at the bar, they found Waldrop and McLeod behind the bar, lying "head to head" in a pool of blood. Police followed a trail of blood from a bar stool to the rear of the lounge where Ragan's body was located, leading police to surmise that he had tried to escape through a rear door when he collapsed.

Waldrop and Ragan were pronounced dead, while McLeod was barely alive. McLeod remained in the hospital in a coma before dying from her wounds more than two years after the attack, on July 10, 1977. Funchess never went to trial or received a conviction in McLeod's murder.

After the murders, Funchess shared some of the money from the robbery with two women he had met on the street minutes prior to the murders. He used some more of the money to take a cab and travel to Ocala, Florida.

=== Investigation ===
Witnesses observed four men near the lounge on the morning of the murders; one of them, wearing work clothes, drove away from the scene in a station wagon, while the other three, one of whom had a brown package under his arm as he walked out of the lounge, departed in a sedan.

Police initially believed that the crime had to have been committed by more than one person. Initially, they stated that they were looking to question eight former Avondale Liquor Store employees for their potential knowledge of the murders. One of the men they said they were seeking was Funchess, although at the time, they did not confirm he was a suspect.

Funchess was arrested in Ocala approximately two months after the murders and returned to Jacksonville. At first, he claimed he could not remember what happened, but he eventually admitted his guilt in the murders. A psychiatrist induced Funchess into a state of narcosynthesis using a "truth serum" to get Funchess to confess that he had used heroin the morning of the murders before going to the bar.

=== Trial ===
At trial, prosecutors referred to Funchess as an "animal." A court-appointed psychiatrist, Dr. Ernest Miller, described Funchess as a "sociopath" who was "dangerous to society."

The jury voted 10–2 in favor of recommending that Funchess be sentenced to death for the two murders of Waldrop and Ragan. Circuit Judge Gordon A. Duncan agreed with the jury's recommendation. In imposing Funchess's death sentence, Duncan called Funchess's crimes "some of the most senseless, heinous, and horrible murders that have ever taken place in Jacksonville." He called the murders "premeditated" and said, "The Defendant selected the place for a robbery and like a cobra, he carefully chose the time to strike while casually drinking a cup of coffee across the street from the scene of the crimes." He also acknowledged that McLeod was still in a persistent vegetative state.

Funchess was formally sentenced to death for Waldrop's and Ragan's murders on July 18, 1975. He was transferred to Florida's death row on July 29 to await execution.

== Death row and appeals ==
=== Death row ===
During his time on death row, guards described him as a "model prisoner." He only received one disciplinary infraction during his eleven years on death row, for a one-time refusal to approach the front of his cell for a prisoner count. While on death row, Funchess wrote poetry as a distraction from his mental distress and became interested in religion.

=== Early appeals ===
In December 1976, the Florida Supreme Court upheld Funchess's death sentence in a unanimous 7–0 vote. One justice, Arthur England, warned prosecutors against showing jurors inflammatory photographs of the victims, as had happened at Funchess's trial, but concurred with the decision to uphold Funchess's sentence; during his trial, jurors were shown images of Waldrop's body and close-ups of her deceased face while prosecutors commented on the "helpless horror she must have felt while attempting to defend herself from brutal assault."

==== Overturning and reinstatement of death sentence ====
In 1979, the United States Supreme Court vacated Funchess's death sentence due to his attorneys successfully arguing that Judge Duncan used a confidential portion of an investigation, to which his attorneys did not have access, to influence his decision to agree with the jury's verdict and sentence Funchess to death. In their decision, the U.S. Supreme Court unanimously asserted that death row inmates and their attorneys should have access to every piece of information available to the judges who impose their death sentences. Funchess was granted a new sentencing hearing during which he and his lawyers could argue before Judge Duncan that the confidential information Duncan possessed had a significant impact on his decision to impose a death sentence against Funchess. Duncan was not required to impanel another jury to recommend a sentence.

At his resentencing hearing in December 1979, Funchess asked the court and God to show him mercy. Judge Duncan resentenced Funchess to death for Waldrop's and Ragan's murders, citing the circumstances and brutality of the murders. The Supreme Court of the United States announced on October 19, 1981, that they would not review Funchess's case.

=== PTSD awareness, diagnoses, and clemency requests ===
At the time of Funchess's death sentence, PTSD was not fully understood; one of his appellate attorneys, Michael Mello, stated that the general perception of Vietnam War veterans at the time was that they were "either violent or drug addicts, or both," who received ostracism and a hostile reception upon their return. Mello also pointed out that the United States government was not entirely privy to the needs of veterans before 1980, which was the year the American Psychiatric Association added PTSD to the third edition of the Diagnostic and Statistical Manual of Mental Disorders (DSM-III). Also that year, the United States Congress held special hearings of the Senate Committee on Veterans' Affairs, during which Senator Alan Cranston acknowledged the neglect of Vietnam veterans' needs throughout the 1970s.

Funchess was twice officially diagnosed with PTSD in 1982 by two separate doctors, including Dr. John Smith, one of the leading experts in the United States on the topic of PTSD. Dr. Smith said Funchess's diagnosis was "consistent with the psychological data collected by the clinicians who had previously examined [him]." Smith also said Funchess would have responded "extremely well" to treatment designed specifically to combat PTSD. Another separate doctor, when discussing Funchess's crimes with the added context of Funchess's PTSD, remarked that Funchess likely committed the murders in the middle of "a prolonged episode of cognitive confusion and dissociation," while Smith found that PTSD "could erupt, on occasion, into uncontrollable outbursts of aggressive behavior."

==== Clemency hearing and death warrants ====
On May 17, 1982, soon after Funchess's diagnoses, he and his attorneys attended a hearing before Florida Governor Bob Graham to request clemency. At the hearing, his attorneys argued that Funchess had been officially diagnosed twice with PTSD, which was not fully recognized during his trial and therefore could not have been used in his defense; at the time of his trial, the psychological effect of the Vietnam War on surviving veterans was not fully realized. Despite Funchess's two official diagnoses, Governor Graham denied Funchess's clemency plea. In a statement explaining his decision, Governor Graham claimed that PTSD "did not apply in Funchess's case." Some death penalty opponents accused Graham of basing his decision in Funchess's case on "political expediency," positing that his decision was rooted in the fact that at the time, he was campaigning for a seat in the United States Senate and knew that many of his constituents felt strongly in support of the death penalty. Later in 1982, Graham signed Funchess's first death warrant and the 36th overall warrant signed in his time in office, scheduling Funchess's execution to take place on July 20, 1982, but a federal judge issued an indefinite stay on July 18, postponing the execution.

Governor Graham signed Funchess's second and final death warrant in February 1986, scheduling Funchess's execution to take place at 7:00 am on April 22, 1986, alongside John Earl Bush (whose execution was ultimately delayed until October 21, 1996). After Governor Graham signed Funchess's death warrant, the Florida Office of Capital Collateral Representatives (CCR) again argued that Funchess deserved a new trial because PTSD was not fully recognized at the time of his original trial and that his moral culpability for the murders could not be assessed without taking his PTSD into account. Appellate courts rejected Funchess's arguments because he did not bring up PTSD at the time of his trial, a decision Funchess's attorneys criticized as being based on a "legal technicality," about which one of Funchess's attorneys asked, "How can trial lawyers in 1986 be blamed for not raising a claim that did not exist in 1976? How can courts in 1986 use that prior failure as a basis for refusing to consider powerful evidence of PTSD? And the ultimate question: why should a condemned person have to pay with his life for the mistakes of his lawyers?"

A federal appellate court found Funchess's lawyers to be at fault since they had been aware of the PTSD diagnosis since 1982, but failed to raise it as an issue in either of their two petitions for federal habeas corpus relief for Funches.

Funchess's attorneys asked Governor Graham to extend clemency to Funchess based on his mental health and struggles with PTSD, but Graham again refused. Graham's assistant counsel said he was open to meeting Funchess's attorneys, but he also claimed many of Funchess's arguments had already been brought up to no effect in the 1982 clemency hearing.

== Protests and execution ==
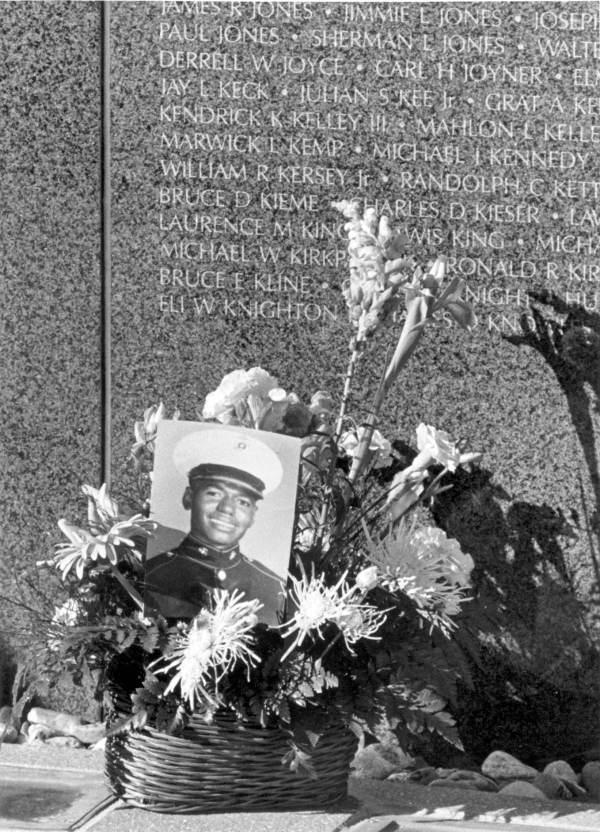
A photo of Funchess in his U.S. Marines uniform, placed in a bouquet of flowers in front of the Florida Vietnam War Memorial, during a protest against his execution on April 22, 1986

=== Protests from Vietnam veterans ===
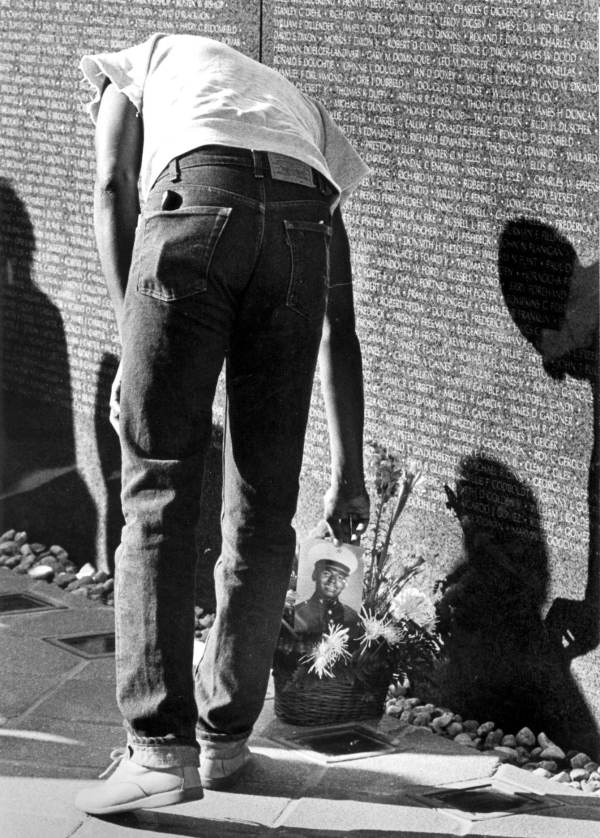
A man placing and/or adjusting a photo of David Funchess in his U.S. Marines uniform, nestling it in a bouquet of flowers in front of the Florida Vietnam Veterans Memorial, during a protest against his execution on April 22, 1986

A group of Vietnam War veterans participated in a press conference on April 18, 1986, to ask Governor Graham to commute Funchess's death sentence to life imprisonment. One of them, Jeff Thompson, said that Funchess "had never been violent except in Vietnam, in the service of his country. We are not here to excuse the fact of the violent murder he committed. But David Funchess suffered greatly in the service of his country. If not for that service [...] he would not have committed these crimes." Thompson also pointed out, similarly to Funchess's appellate attorneys, that at Funchess's trial, no one had introduced evidence of his psychological trauma or his exposure to Agent Orange to potentially mitigate the sentence he might have received.

A group called Veterans for Peace set up a round-the-clock vigil at the Florida Vietnam War Memorial that was intended to last from 7:00 pm on April 20, 1986, to 7:00 am on April 22, the time of Funchess's scheduled execution. The stays which delayed the execution of Funchess's sentence also prolonged the vigil. Members of the group called Funchess a "forgotten man" and protested that neither Governor Graham nor the courts had taken Funchess's PTSD into enough consideration.

=== Execution ===
Anna Waldrop's daughter wrote a letter to the Florida Attorney General's office asking for permission to witness Funchess's execution, although the Florida Department of Corrections had a policy at the time prohibiting the families of victims or the condemned party from witnessing executions; Waldrop's daughter said that if her request was rejected, she would stand outside Florida State Prison among other death penalty supporters while his sentence was carried out. She also told reporters that she supported Funchess's execution and wanted to watch it for closure.

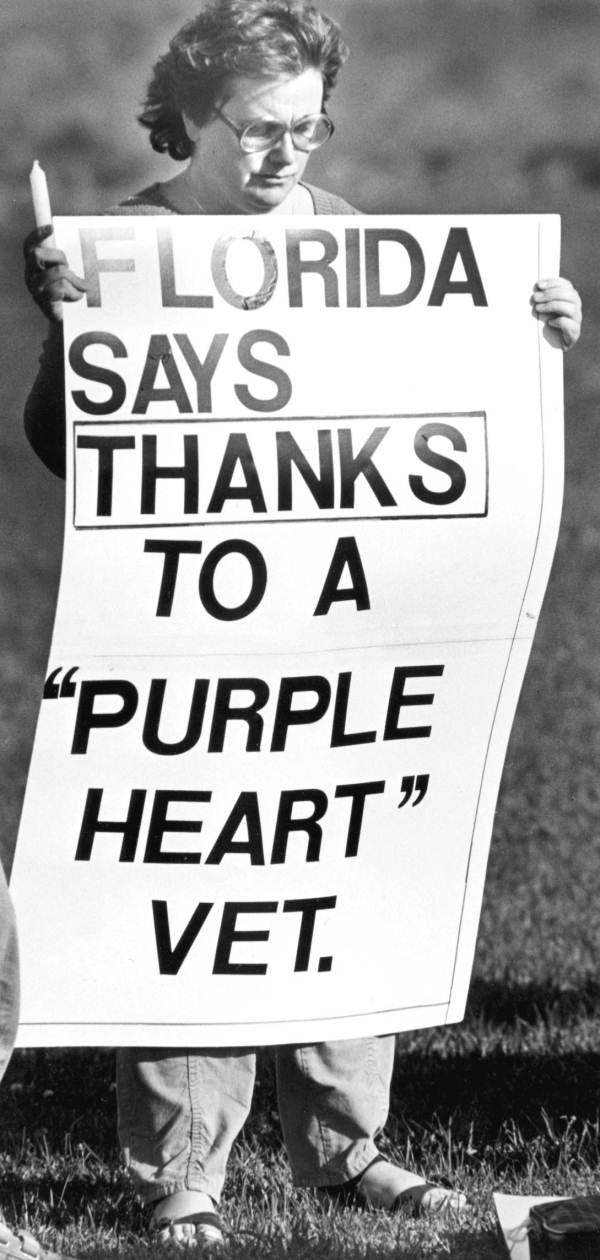
Patricia Frank of the Florida chapter of Pax Christi, an international Catholic peace organization, protesting Funchess's execution with a sign reading, "Florida Says Thanks to a "Purple Heart" Vet"

Funchess spent his final hours with his parents, his wife, two sisters, and three brothers. His execution was scheduled for 7:00 am on April 22, 1986. A federal appellate court granted him a last-minute temporary stay of execution, delaying the execution while Funchess's attorneys obtained a second temporary stay of execution from the United States Supreme Court. However, approximately five hours later, the U.S. Supreme Court voted 7–2 against extending the stay.

Funchess was led to the electric chair shortly afterwards. Reporters observed him smiling at his attorney Susan Cary, who witnessed the execution alongside Jeff Thompson, and mouthing, "It's OK, it's OK. I love you." He declined to make a formal final statement. He was pronounced dead at 5:11 pm. Clayton Ragan's daughter and Anna Waldrop's daughter were outside the prison during the execution and expressed relief at the execution and sympathy for Funchess's family for their loss, although Ragan's daughter later expressed disapproval of the crowd of death penalty supporters who erupted into cheers at the news of Funchess's death, saying, "I would never do that. To even be a part of the execution is so degrading. No death is a reason to be happy." She also said, "I don't like being here, but I felt I owed it." Elsewhere, death penalty opponents placed a photo of Funchess in uniform by Florida's Vietnam Veteran's Memorial to protest his execution.

==== Aftermath ====
At the moment of Funchess's execution, Linda Reynolds, the Director of the Florida Clearinghouse on Criminal Justice, criticized Governor Graham for his refusal to intervene, saying, "David Funchess was killed twice by society: once in Vietnam, and once today." After his execution, William Mitchell College of Law Professor Peter Erlinder noted that two veterans had been acquitted of murder charges since 1980 after using their PTSD diagnoses in their defenses, while Funchess was executed despite having his own diagnoses.

The next year, one of Funchess's attorneys pointed out that the U.S. Supreme Court decision reversing Florida death row inmate James Hitchcock's sentence in Hitchcock v. Florida, regarding the judge giving the jury improper instructions not to consider any non-statutory mitigating circumstances in determining their sentence, very likely would have earned Funchess a new sentencing hearing had he still been alive, since his jury had received the same improper instructions.

Funchess was buried on Jeff Thompson's land in a rural north Florida county; a group of veterans and anti-death penalty citizens arranged the burial, as Funchess's siblings did not wish to return his body to Jacksonville.

== See also ==
- Capital punishment in Florida
- List of people executed in Florida
- List of people executed in the United States in 1986
- Post-traumatic stress disorder
- Vietnam veteran
