= WordRake =

Seattle-based company that produces editing software

WordRake is a Seattle-based company that produces editing software of the same name. WordRake software is intended to improve the brevity and clarity of writing. WordRake is used in over 7000 law firms (its initial market), and in businesses, government agencies, and academia. In January 2013, the City of Seattle announced that it had installed WordRake for use in several municipal departments.

Reviews of WordRake have been generally positive while acknowledging the software’s limitations. The program works as an extension to Microsoft Word, with another version for Outlook, and, like automated spelling and grammar checking, WordRake can be prone to false positives.
