= List of Louisiana state prisons =

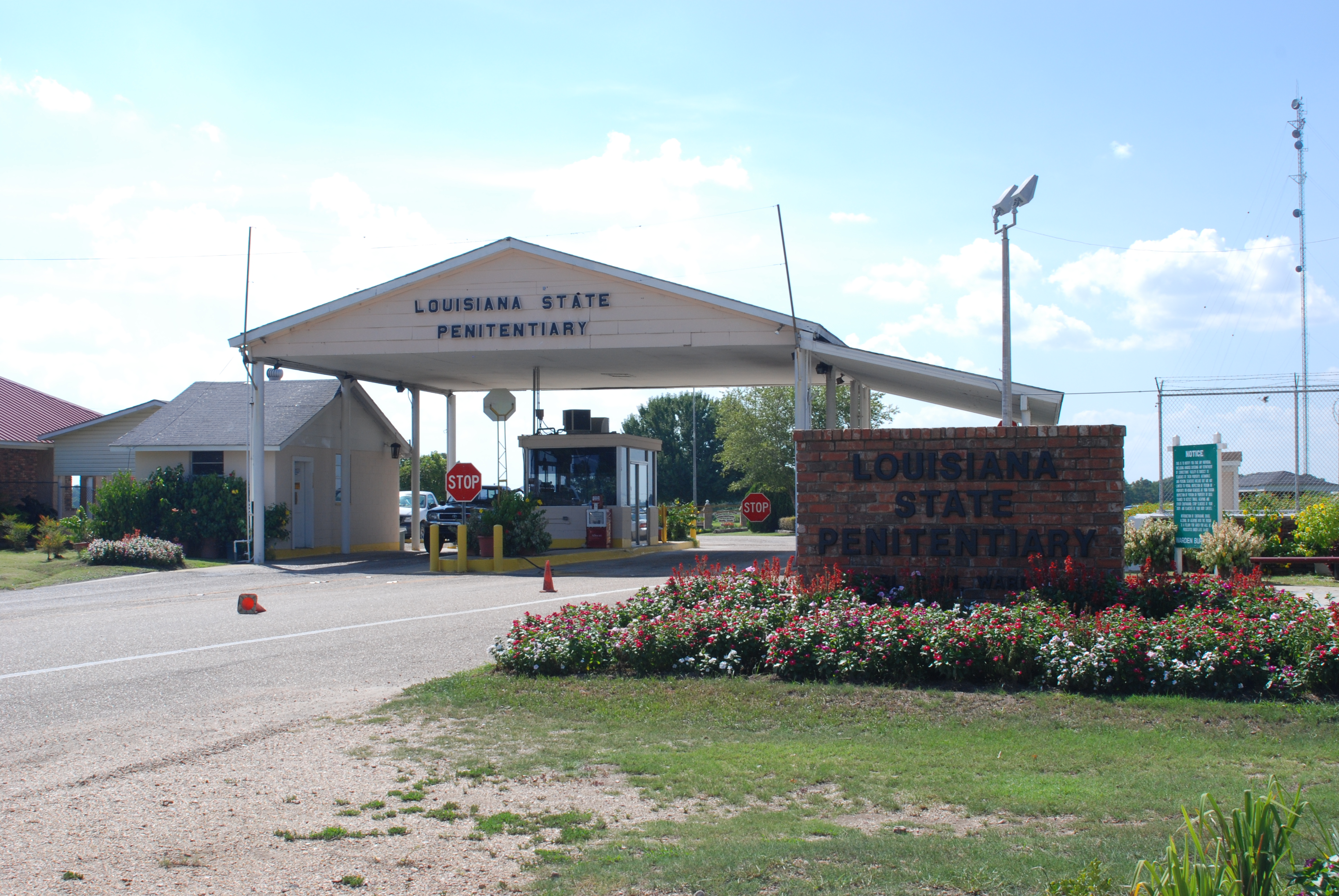
Louisiana State Penitentiary

Louisiana state and private prisons

This is a list of adult correctional facilities in Louisiana. It does not include federal prisons or parish jails located in the state of Louisiana. The Louisiana Department of Public Safety & Corrections directly operates all except two.

- Allen Correctional Center
- Raymond Laborde Correctional Center
- B. B. Rayburn Correctional Center
- David Wade Correctional Center
- Dixon Correctional Institute
- Elayn Hunt Correctional Center
- Louisiana Correctional Institute for Women
- Louisiana State Penitentiary

Private Facility

- Winn Correctional Center

Other Facilities Occupied With DOC

- Nelson Coleman Correction Center
- Plaquemines Parish Detention Center

Former facilities:

- C. Paul Phelps Correctional Center (Closed 2012)
- Forcht-Wade Correctional Center (closed July 2012)
- J. Levy Dabadie Correctional Center (closed July 2012)
- Steve Hoyle Rehabilitation Center - Now located in the Bossier Parish Correctional Center.
