= Burl Cain =

American penologist (born 1942)

Nathan Burl Cain
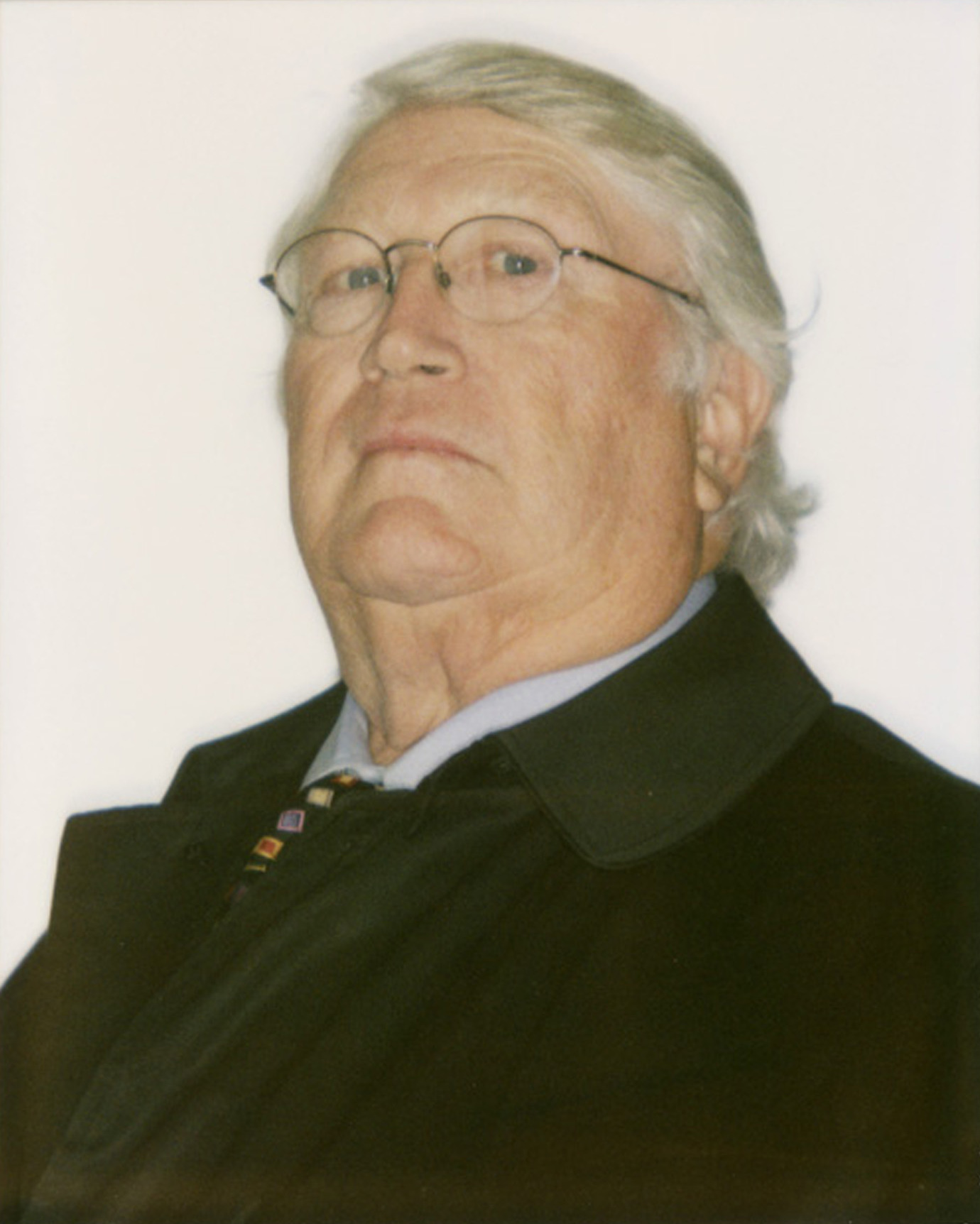
- Cain in 2008
- Born: Nathan Burl Cain; July 2, 1942 (age 84); Pitkin, Louisiana, U.S.
- Education: Louisiana State University, Alexandria; Grambling State University
- Occupation: Corrections
- Political party: Republican
- Spouse: Jonalyn Miceli Cain
- Children: Nathan Burl Cain, II; Marshall Arbuthnot Cain; Amanda Cain Smith

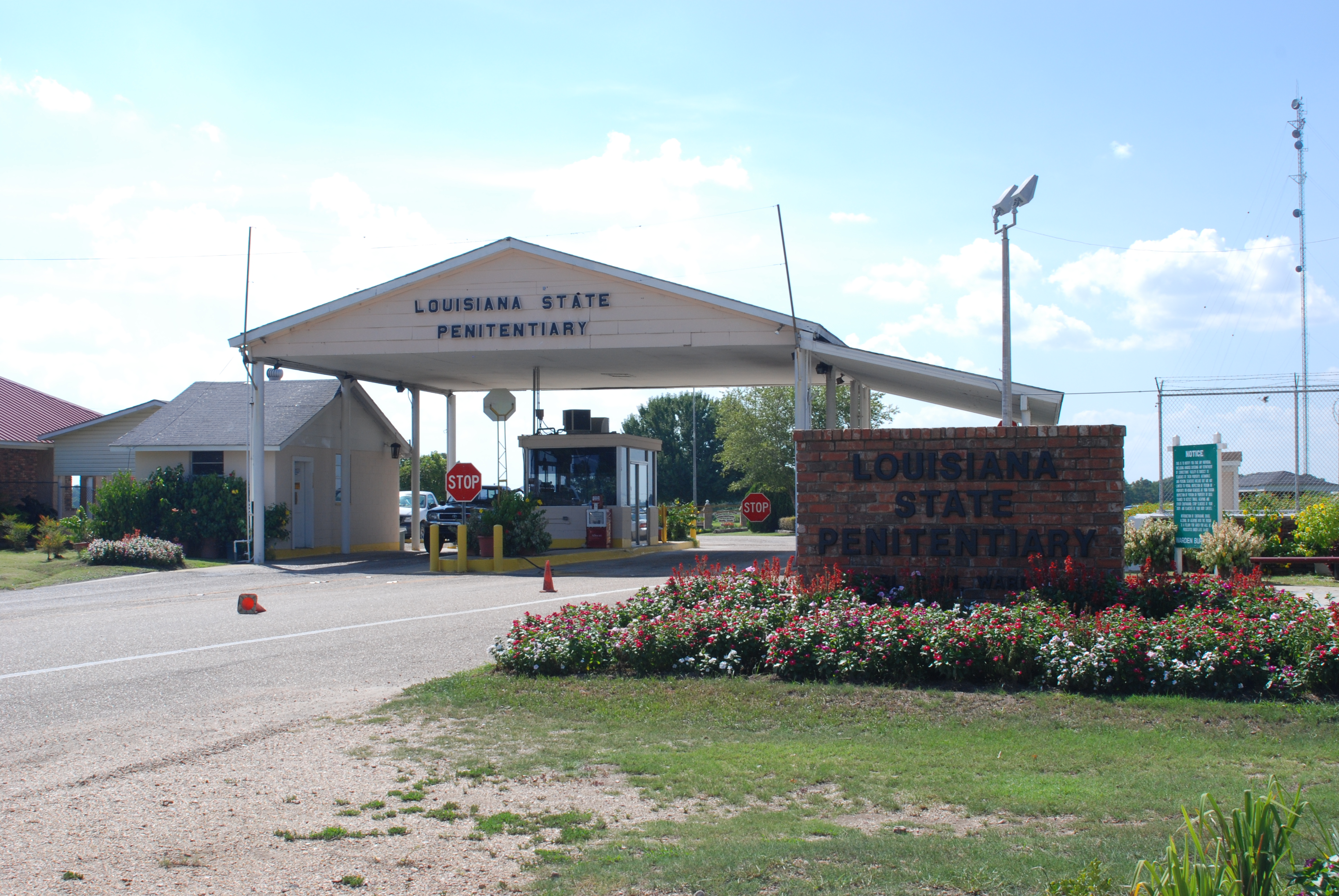
Louisiana State Penitentiary, the prison which Cain managed

Nathan Burl Cain (born July 2, 1942) is an American corrections officer and prison warden who currently serves as the commissioner of the Mississippi Department of Corrections and the former warden at the Louisiana State Penitentiary at Angola in West Feliciana Parish, north of Baton Rouge, Louisiana. He worked there for twenty-one years, from January 1995 until his resignation in 2016.

== Biography ==
Cain was reared in Pitkin in Vernon Parish in western Louisiana. He is the brother of James David Cain, a former Republican member of the Louisiana House of Representatives and the Louisiana State Senate, and Alton Cain. Commissioner Cain holds a degree from Louisiana State University at Alexandria and a master's degree in criminal justice from Grambling State University in Lincoln Parish.

He began his career with the Louisiana branch of the American Farm Bureau Federation. He was appointed as the assistant secretary of agribusiness for the Louisiana Department of Public Safety & Corrections. In 1981, he was appointed as the warden of the Dixon Correctional Institute (DCI).

After fourteen years there, he was elevated to warden of the Louisiana State Penitentiary. After accepting the job at Angola, he continued to live on the grounds of Dixon. Until 2011, Cain served as the vice chairperson of the Louisiana Civil Service Commission.

=== Tenure at Angola ===
Louisiana State Penitentiary, also called Angola after the name of the slave plantation that formerly occupied its land, is the largest maximum-security prison in the United States. Many of the inmates are imprisoned for life or for equivalently long terms and are unlikely ever to be released. Commissioner Cain claims that under his tenure violent incidents decreased significantly among the inmate population as the prison transitioned to a model based on a Christian religious atmosphere and manual labor, enforced in part with threats of solitary confinement and other punishments. But his claims are highly disputed. During his tenure he became the most famous warden in U.S. history, but before he retired he also became one of the most controversial wardens in U.S. history.

As warden, Cain created an exclusively Christian religious environment in which inmates who displayed adherence to the faith were rewarded and those who did not were punished. A branch of the New Orleans Baptist Theological Seminary was established at Angola during Cain's tenure, one of the prison's eight churches. In August 2006, the American Civil Liberties Union filed a lawsuit accusing then-Warden Cain and the Louisiana state prison system of hindering a Mormon inmate's access to religious texts. At least one Catholic inmate was also allegedly harassed for requesting to receive Mass while imprisoned on Death Row.

Cain increased media access to the prison, and several documentaries were filmed at the prison during his tenure. He also established a television station at the prison and supported the newsmagazine and radio. Filmed events at the prison include the Angola Prison Rodeo, football, and boxing matches. Cain established a prison-run hospice program in 1997. In 2008, Cain became the longest-serving warden in the history of Angola.

While at Angola, in September/October 2005, Cain also became the warden of Camp Greyhound, a temporary jail in New Orleans in the aftermath of Hurricane Katrina.

In 2016, when he resigned, the prison had 3,600 inmates on 18,000 acres. Gordon Russell and Maya Lau of The Advocate reported that Cain's salary, $167,211 per year was $30,000 higher than that of James LeBlanc, Secretary of the Louisiana Department of Corrections and a previous subordinate and personal friend of Cain. According to Russell and Lau, many observers said that Cain was de facto the head of the department.

In 2008 Cain said he supported continuing solitary confinement for the men known as the Angola 3. In a 2008 deposition, attorneys for Woodfox asked Cain:

'Let's just for the sake of argument assume, if you can, that he is not guilty of the murder of Brent Miller.' Cain responded, 'Okay, I would still keep him in CCR…I still know that he is still trying to practice Black Pantherism, and I still would not want him walking around my prison because he would organize the young new inmates. I would have me all kind of problems, more than I could stand, and I would have the blacks chasing after them.'"

Cain has been compared by both supporters and detractors to the Dukes of Hazzard character Boss Hogg.

In 2010, Cain was among the speakers in a series at Calvin College in Grand Rapids, Michigan.

In December 2013, a federal judge ruled that death row at Angola is so hot during part of the year that the temperatures undermine the Eighth Amendment to the United States Constitution, which forbids "cruel and unusual punishment". The judge demanded a plan to cool death row. Prison officials appealed the order.

==== Resignation ====
Cain's resignation as warden came amid allegations about his private real estate dealings raised by The Baton Rouge Advocate. The capital city newspaper claimed that Cain sold interest in land that he owned in West Feliciana Parish to two developers who were reportedly either family or friends of two Angola inmates incarcerated for conviction of murder. The state legislative auditor and the state Department of Public Safety & Corrections began investigations into the issue. In May 2016, Cain was exonerated of any wrongdoing, with respect to using his employees to perform home renovations.

In January 2017, a separate report from the office of Daryl G. Purpera, the state legislative auditor, said that some ten correctional department employees performed work on Cain's private residence near Central in East Baton Rouge Parish. One worked for Cain for three weeks while on official duty at his regular state job. In addition to the labor which Cain received, the audit alleges that the former warden obtained appliances and furnishings, such as iron gates, and food and lodging at the penitentiary for a number of his relatives, mostly his children.

Corrections Secretary Jimmy LeBlanc, Cain's long-term friend and business partner, said that Cain was "personally liable" for $20,000 for the costs of the food, lodging and gates; and that the department will file a civil suit or seek restitution if Cain faces prosecution in the matter. Cain discounted the findings of the Purpera report, saying it had misinterpreted his "creative" approach to handling his duties as warden. Cain claims to have transformed the long-running Angola Prison Rodeo into a self-sustaining facility, resulting in a financial windfall for the state. He also authorized the construction of five new chapels built with privately raised funds.

Cain said that it was his

"being creative and thinking outside the box that got me in trouble. These kinds of things discourage state employees from being entrepreneurial. … I stole nothing. I gave. … I should be tossed off rather than condemned."

Ultimately Cain was cleared by the Daryl Purpera investigation and by another probe into his activities by the Department of Public Safety and Corrections. Cain said that he never doubted that he would be cleared because he had stolen nothing, had merely "thought outside the box" to bring needed changes to the penitentiary. He said that prayers from his fellow Southern Baptists assured that he would receive justice in the investigations.

The district attorney for the Louisiana 20th Judicial District, Sam D'Aquilla, indicated that he would refer the case to a grand jury.

=== Mississippi ===
As of 2020 he became the head of the Mississippi Department of Corrections. Governor of Mississippi Tate Reeves chose Cain as the agency head. In June 2020 a Mississippi legislative committee approved Cain's nomination. The Mississippi Senate confirmed Cain that month.

== Personal life ==
According to a biography by Ridgeway, Cain "enjoys hunting and traveling around the country on his motorcycle." Both he and his brother, former state senator James David Cain, are Republicans.

Cain's eldest son, Nathan "Nate" Cain, II (born April 1967), and his younger son, Marshall Arbuthnot Cain (born October 1971), of Ouachita Parish, also have had careers with the Louisiana Department of Corrections. Cain, II, had advanced to become warden of Avoyelles Correctional Center in Cottonport, a facility since named for former state Representative Raymond Laborde of Marksville. He vacated the warden's position in Cottonport on May 24, 2016. Marshall Cain is a manager of Prison Enterprises. Cain's son-in-law, Seth Henry Smith, Jr. (born January 1974), of East Feliciana Parish, also works for the corrections department, as a "confidential assistant" to one of the appointed officials.

Prior to Nate Cain's decision to resign from Avoyelles Correctional Center, his wife, the former Tonia Bandy, business manager of the prison and another top official, also stepped down. Tonia Cain's attorney cited her client's health issues as the principal reason for the resignation. Meanwhile, the state corrections department said that it had halted the construction of the "Ranch House" building at the Avoyelles prison, a structure for which some $76,000 had already been spent. Nate Cain had built an identical structure at the C. Paul Phelps Correctional Center in DeQuincy in Calcasieu Parish, where he was earlier the deputy warden.

Nate and Tonia Cain divorced in 2017, and she resumed her maiden name of Bandy. She agreed to plea bargain and admitted to some of the seventeen wire fraud charges (and an additional count of conspiracy to commit wire fraud) in hopes of getting a lighter sentence than she would have received if convicted of the crimes. The two stood accused of purchasing personal items, including television sets, furniture, and guns and ammunition, on a state credit card. As it developed, Bandy pleaded guilty to a single count of conspiracy to commit wire fraud in the federal corruption case against both her and her former husband. The government then dropped seventeen fraud charges pending against her. Sentencing was originally scheduled for October 9, 2018, with Tonia facing up to twenty years in a penitentiary, though she was expected to receive a more lenient sentence. On June 17, 2019, Tonia received an eight-month sentence in federal prison, while Nate received a 38-month sentence in federal prison; both were also ordered to serve two years of supervised release and to pay more than $42,000 in restitution.

== Representation in media ==
- The Execution of Antonio James (1996), documentary at LSP directed by Liz Garbus and Jonathan Stack
- The Farm: Angola, USA (1998), documentary directed by Garbus and Stack
- The Farm: 10 Years Down (2009), documentary directed by Stack
- Serving Life (2011), documentary about LSP's hospice care of inmates, a program established in 1997. It is directed by journalist Lisa R. Cohen; the narrator and executive producer is Academy Award-winning actor Forest Whitaker.
- Appeared in Season 1, Episode 3 of the 2008 series: Stephen Fry in America
