= OYD =

OYD may refer to:

- OYD, a general service variation of the Bedford OY truck
- Office of Youth Development, former name of the Louisiana Office of Juvenile Justice
