= Antoinette Frank =

American convicted murderer and former police officer (born 1971)

- Frank's DPS&C photo (2025)
- Born: Antoinette Renee Frank; April 30, 1971 (age 55); Opelousas, Louisiana, U.S.
- Occupations: Police officer, New Orleans Police Department (former, 1993–1995)
- Status: Incarcerated
- Conviction: First degree murder (3 counts)
- Penalty: Death

Details
- Victims: 4
- Span of crimes: 1993–1995
- Country: United States
- State: Louisiana
- Imprisoned at: Louisiana Correctional Institute for Women

Antoinette Renee Frank (born April 30, 1971) is an American mass murderer and former police officer who committed the 1995 Kim Anh murders, in which she and her probable lover, drug dealer Rogers LaCaze, shot and killed three people, two staff members and a fellow NOPD officer. After the murders, Frank fled, but returned to the scene of the crime shortly after the survivors called the police, arriving in a police patrol car. She then pretended to have had nothing to do with the crime, even asking a survivor, who had hidden in a freezer, what had happened.

"You saw what happened. You killed my brother and sister."

Frank was convicted of three counts of first degree murder and sentenced to death. She has been incarcerated since 1995 at the Louisiana Correctional Institute for Women in St. Gabriel, Louisiana, the only woman on the state's death row. Frank is also believed to have killed her father, Adam Frank, who had physically and possibly sexually abused her during childhood. A month after she was sentenced to death, police found a human skull with a bullet hole buried under Frank's house. He had stayed at his daughter's home shortly before she reported him missing in 1993.

== Early life ==
Frank was born in Opelousas, Louisiana, as one of four children to Adam and Mary Ann Frank. Adam Frank, a telephone company worker and Vietnam veteran, was often absent from home. Louisiana Department of Veterans Affairs records showed that Adam was physically and emotionally abusive towards his children and once strangled his then-two-year-old daughter Antoinette. During her childhood, Frank was described as a loner and unusually shy. In high school, she served as a junior police officer for the Opelousas Police Department and when the family relocated to the eastern part of New Orleans, Frank joined the New Orleans Police Explorers, which she left shortly after when the Frank family returned to Opelousas.

Frank later claimed that her father's abuse included filling the house with gas and threatening to have the entire family killed in a train collision. After her imprisonment, Frank stated that her father began raping her when she started puberty and that he forced her to have three abortions between the ages of 16 and 20. A fellow police recruit stated that Frank and her father would interact "as if they were lovers" and that Frank sat in her father's lap at social events. A psychologist who treated Frank during her incarceration determined that Frank most likely had post-traumatic stress disorder and dependent personality disorder. Frank's mother and siblings had moved out due to Adam Frank's domestic violence by the time the sexual abuse began and doctors who conducted the abortions were deceased by the time of the report in 2009.

In June 1988, Frank found work at a Walmart in Opelousas, where she was noted for being unable to get along with colleagues, and was fired after six months for giving false information on her application. After graduating high school in May 1989, Frank moved to New Orleans by herself and was rehired by another Walmart, with plans to join the New Orleans Police Department (NOPD) as soon as she turned 20, the minimum age to apply.

== Police career ==
On April 30, 1991, Frank applied with the New Orleans Police Department for the first time, but failed a psychological examination, which concluded that Frank had a tendency to lie and overexaggerate her skills and background. However, she was granted entry into the police academy after a psychiatrist hired by Frank gave a more favorable evaluation. In June 1992, she moved into a house in New Orleans with her father Adam. While at the academy, Frank's father reported his daughter missing after he found a note in which Frank voiced self-hatred and described herself as "doomed since the day I was born". She returned shortly after and was hired by the NOPD in February 1993. She presented two letters of recommendation, one supposedly by then-mayor Sidney Barthelemy, who denied signing the letter. Frank's father disappeared in June or August 1993.

According to author Chuck Hustmyre, Frank was caught lying on several sections of her employment application and failed two standard psychiatric evaluations, with psychiatrist Philip Scurria advising against her hiring. Despite this, Frank got a second chance to apply. The NOPD was chronically short-handed; at the time, its officers were paid less than in similarly sized cities, it was losing officers faster than they could be replaced, and the ranks had been decimated by several arrests for murder and drug activity. Many potential applicants were shut out due to a requirement that all officers be residents of New Orleans – a requirement that was only changed in 2014. NOPD officials also thought having more African-Americans like Frank on the force would ease longstanding racial tensions in the majority-black city. She was hired on February 7, 1993, and graduated from the police academy on February 28.

Although Frank graduated near the top of her academy class, her tenure with the NOPD left much to be desired. Her fellow officers thought she was rather shy, had no idea what police work really entailed and lacked the decisiveness to be a good officer. At times, they thought Frank veered into irrational behavior. As early as August 1993, Frank's superiors wanted to send her back to the academy for further training. She frequently had to go through supervisory review. On occasion, though, she did distinguish herself, winning "Officer of the Month" awards from the local Kiwanis Club for her work in the community.

== Relationship with Rogers LaCaze ==
On November 25, 1994, Frank handled an incident in which Rogers Joseph LaCaze (born August 13, 1976), a known drug dealer, had been shot. An investigator with the Department of Public Safety and Corrections (DOC) believed this was the first contact between the two, although in her statement, Frank claims that they met some eight months before the murders. Frank had taken a statement from LaCaze after he was shot on the street, and initially got closer to him in hopes of turning his life around. However, she was smitten by LaCaze's "bad boy" persona, and their relationship soon turned sexual. She kept up her relationship even though she was well aware she was jeopardizing her career. Frank later maintained that their relationship was platonic and that she had only mentored him.

The association between Frank and LaCaze became noticeable after other police officers witnessed LaCaze driving her car, and even observed him moving her police unit at the scene of an accident she was investigating. On one occasion, LaCaze accompanied her on a complaint call where she introduced him as a "trainee"; on other occasions, she introduced LaCaze as her nephew. Prior to the murders, others testified that Frank and LaCaze would pull over and rob motorists while in a squad car.

Frank refused to discuss her relationship with LaCaze during the DOC investigation, except to say that she was trying to help him. It was later revealed that the two had a sexual relationship. When asked why she would continue the relationship, knowing that LaCaze had been involved in dealing drugs and a shooting, she responded that she would not disassociate herself from him just because of his past. The investigator also questioned Frank about trying to buy 9 mm ammunition for LaCaze at Walmart on the day before the Kim Anh murders, but stated that she was a police officer and that there was nothing wrong with her buying ammunition. In her statement, she claimed that she and LaCaze were not dating and had never been intimate. Frank refused to discuss anything regarding the murders—‌every time the investigator asked her a question, she told him to "look it up in the record" or asserted her innocence. However, during her interview with the DOC investigator, Frank claimed to have had a male suitor but refused to go into specifics because he worked for the police department.

Two men who claimed they met LaCaze at a party on February 4, 1995, John Stevens and Anthony Wallace, testified in court. As the two were leaving the party, a verbal altercation between Stevens and LaCaze ensued, but Wallace suggested they leave. The two men got in a car and drove several blocks until a police vehicle pulled the car over. In police uniform, Frank exited the squad car and told Wallace and Stevens to get out and go to the back of the car. At that point, Wallace saw LaCaze and noticed he was holding a gun. According to Stevens, Wallace rushed LaCaze, and the two men began fighting. Then both Stevens and Frank also jumped into the fray, and the weapon discharged. Stevens began running, but a man named Irvin Bryant appeared and grabbed both LaCaze and Wallace. Frank then told the man that "LaCaze was the good guy" and that Wallace was the one causing the problems. Wallace was restrained until a backup unit arrived on the scene when he was subsequently arrested and charged with attempted murder and armed robbery.

Irvin Bryant, a civil sheriff in 1995, testified that on the evening of February 4, he observed a stopped police vehicle with its lights flashing. Bryant thought the officer was making a traffic stop, but as he got closer, he saw the officer and two black men fighting on the side of the road. At that time, Wallace broke away, ran, and picked up a TEC-9 semi-automatic weapon off the grass. Bryant ordered Wallace to drop the gun, which he did immediately and was restrained; LaCaze then lunged toward Wallace, but Bryant grabbed him. Frank informed him that LaCaze was with her and ordered him released. Despite his involvement in the altercation, Bryant was never questioned by police, and he never gave a formal statement.

== Kim Anh murders ==
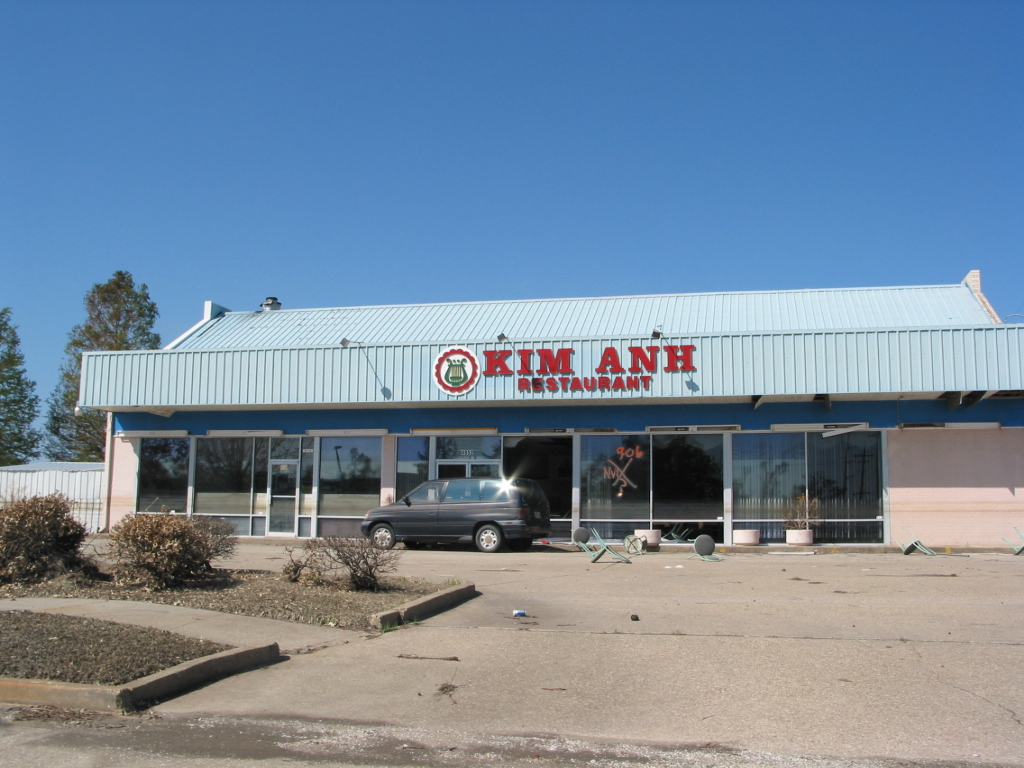
Kim Anh restaurant in 2005

On the night of March 3–4, 1995, Frank and LaCaze visited the Kim Anh restaurant, a Vietnamese restaurant run by the Vu family, where Frank worked part-time as a security guard, two times to order food and drinks, with Frank stealing a front door key during this time.

Frank and LaCaze returned for a third time at around 2 a.m. The staff had become wary of Frank and her new companion, so one of the employees, Chau Vu, hid the money meant for business expenses away in the kitchen. Frank opened the front door with the stolen key and corralled Chau and her brother Quoc into the staff-only area. LaCaze snuck up on the present security guard, 25-year-old Ronnie Williams, a fellow NOPD officer and colleague of Frank, and fatally wounded him with three gunshots. Frank was distracted by this and lost sight of the two siblings, who hid in a walk-in cooler with a third employee. Frank and LaCaze subsequently questioned the two remaining employees, Chau and Quoc's 24-year-old sister Ha and 17-year-old brother Cuong, for the location of the restaurant's money. After recovering the cash, Frank killed the siblings with multiple gunshots and left with LaCaze after failing to locate the survivors.

Quoc fled the building to call help while Chau stayed behind to wait for police. Frank returned shortly after, driving a police cruiser from her precinct, in an attempt to lure the survivors out and kill them before police backup showed up. Chau remained hidden until other officers arrived, to whom she identified Frank as one of the perpetrators.

Eddie Rantz, the homicide detective who worked the case, believed Frank and LaCaze planned the robbery to get revenge on Williams. Frank believed Williams was shortchanging her on hours and pay at the Kim Anh, and wanted revenge. Rantz subsequently described Frank as the most cold-hearted person he had ever encountered in three decades as an officer. Chau and Frank were questioned in detail while seated at different tables in the restaurant. Frank was arrested and charged with three counts of first degree murder. LaCaze was arrested and charged later that night. Frank was taken to police headquarters for additional questioning, where she later confessed to the crimes along with LaCaze. She was believed to be the first New Orleans police officer to have been charged with killing a fellow officer.

== Trial and conviction ==
Frank and LaCaze were indicted by an Orleans Parish grand jury on April 28, 1995. Their trials were severed, and LaCaze was tried first on July 17–21, 1995, before Judge Frank Marullo. He was found guilty as charged and sentenced to death. His main tip-off had been using Williams' Chevron credit card at a Chevron station in Gretna just minutes after the robbery and murders. In 2002, LaCaze's defense attempted to overturn the death sentence by claiming cruel and unusual punishment, stating that LaCaze was a "17-year-old mentally retarded child with an IQ of 71" at the time of the crime, but the Supreme Court of Louisiana denied the argument as LaCaze was 18 years old when he met Frank and participated in the robbery with her, also pointing out that mild intellectual disability is recognized at an IQ of 69 or below.

Frank's trial began on September 5, 1995, also before Marullo. Although Frank's attorneys had subpoenaed 39 witnesses, they didn't call a single one. On September 12, 1995, the jury needed only 22 minutes to return a guilty verdict on all counts—at the time, a record for a capital murder case in New Orleans. The next day, they needed only 45 minutes to recommend the death penalty. She was formally sentenced to death on October 20, 1995, and sent to Death Row at the Louisiana Correctional Institute for Women (LCIW) in St. Gabriel, near Baton Rouge.

== Aftermath and later developments ==
=== Frank's missing father ===
In 1993, a year and a half before the murders at the Kim Anh, Frank's father had stayed at her home for a time before she then reported him missing. In November 1995, a month after she received her first death sentence, a dog led police to find a human skull with a bullet hole buried under Frank's house. In a 2005 retrospective, Chuck Hustmyre said, "As for those human bones unearthed beneath Frank's house, so far, authorities have made no serious effort to identify them. The 10-year-old case, they say, remains under investigation."

Police and prosecutors believe that the skull was that of Adam Frank, and that Antoinette murdered him. However, since she is already on death row for the Kim Anh murders, they have made no effort to try her for her father's death.

=== Appeal to overturn Frank's death sentence ===
On October 18, 2006, Frank's lawyers argued before the Louisiana Supreme Court that her death sentence should be overturned because she was denied state-funded experts to help prepare for the sentencing phase of the trial. They argued that the defense needed to conduct "an investigation into the defendant's background for possible mitigating evidence." Frank's attorneys introduced the testimony of psychiatrists who said that possible traumatic events in Frank's childhood could have affected her behavior at the time of the murders and she may have been suffering from post-traumatic stress disorder. A psychiatrist retained by the state disagreed that Frank showed symptoms of trauma; he agreed with the diagnosis of narcissistic personality disorder with antisocial tendencies given to Frank by doctors at the Louisiana Correctional Institute for Women. On May 22, 2007, the Louisiana Supreme Court ruled 5–2 that the death penalty should be upheld.

On April 22, 2008, District Judge Frank Marullo signed the death warrant for Antoinette Frank. According to the warrant, Frank was scheduled for execution by lethal injection on July 15, 2008. In May, however, the Louisiana Supreme Court issued a 90-day stay of execution effective June 10 pending ongoing appeals.

On September 11, 2008, the day that the state supreme court stay was to end, a new death warrant was signed by the same judge. According to this second warrant, Frank was scheduled for execution by lethal injection on December 8, 2008. In a new round of appeals, defense attorneys argued they had had too little time to review the voluminous record before the deadline for filing appeals. The state supreme court ruled on the case again. Their decision, made public November 25, 2008 effectively voided the death warrant signed by Judge Marullo in September.

In September 2009, Frank's lawyers moved to have Judge Marullo removed from Frank's ongoing post-conviction appeals on grounds of bias, given that he had already signed two death warrants for her. Louisiana state Judge Laurie White heard the motion in September 2009 and, on January 3, 2010, ruled that Marullo should not be taken off the case. Frank's attorney stated she would appeal the ruling to the state's supreme court, which had already overruled both of Marullo's death warrants. However, yet another lower court state judge, ruled in October 2010 that Marullo had to be recused from the Frank and LaCaze cases because it was unclear if he had been open with the defense teams about his own surprising connection to the gun used in the restaurant murders. Marullo's signature appeared on an order authorizing Frank to take the murder weapon from the evidence room; Marullo has long maintained the signature was forged. No female has been executed by the State of Louisiana since Toni Jo Henry died in the State's Electric chair in 1942.

=== Media depictions ===
Frank was profiled in an episode of Deadly Women in 2009, Snapped: Killer Couples in 2015, and I'd Kill For You in 2016.

In November 2020, TV One debuted a movie inspired by Antoinette Frank called Blood on Her Badge.

=== Renewed effort to appeal Antoinette Frank's death sentence ===
LCIW was damaged by 2016 flooding, so its prisoners, including Frank, were moved to other prisons.

In 2023, Louisiana Governor John Bel Edwards, nearing the end of his term in 2024, publicly announced his opposition to the death penalty and advocated for its abolition in the state. However, on May 24, 2023, a majority of lawmakers voted against a bill aimed at abolishing capital punishment. A month later, in June 2023, 56 out of the 57 death row inmates in Louisiana, including Frank, petitioned the governor for clemency, citing his anti-death penalty stance. The pleas were to be processed by the Louisiana Board of Pardons and Committee on Parole.

In July 2023, the state's parole board rejected all 56 clemency petitions, ruling that the inmates were ineligible because such requests could not be filed within a year of a judge's ruling on an appeal. On October 13, 2023, Frank's appeal for clemency was rejected during a meeting of Louisiana's pardon board.

In February 2025, the Louisiana Attorney General Liz Murrill and Governor Jeff Landry announced plans to resume executions with the newly enacted method of nitrogen hypoxia, and convicted murderer Jessie Hoffman Jr. (who raped and killed a woman in 1996) was executed on March 18, 2025, therefore becoming the first inmate executed in the state since 2010. However, Frank was not one of the few inmates who had exhausted all appeals and became eligible for execution, because she is currently filing a post-conviction appeal against her death sentence, and the motion is pending.

On April 28, 2025, Frank's appeal to overturn her death sentence was heard, and state prosecutors were given a week to file a response to her case. On May 15, 2025, a state judge accepted Frank's appeal to overturn her death sentence and ordered a new hearing in December 2025. The judge also rejected an offer from Attorney General Murrill to take over the case when it goes to trial.

== See also ==
- Capital punishment in Louisiana
- List of death row inmates in the United States § Louisiana
- List of women on death row in the United States § Louisiana
