= Perry Keith =

American politician (1847–1935)

Perry Polk Keith Sr.

Louisiana State Representative for Caddo Parish
- In office 1912–1928
- Preceded by: At-large members: W. H. B. Croom; Henry Hunsicker; Leon R. Smith Lee Emmett Thomas
- Succeeded by: At-large members: Harvey S. Bogan; Reuben T. Douglas; Joseph B. Hamiter Cecil Morgan Sr.

Personal details
- Born: Near Macon, Georgia, US
- Died: Keithville, Louisiana, US
- Resting place: Keithville Cemetery
- Party: Democratic
- Spouse: Narcissa Miller Keith (married 1871–1910, her death)
- Children: 8
- Occupation: Planter and developer

Perry Polk Keith Sr. (October 20, 1847 – February 6, 1935), was a planter, developer, and member of the Louisiana House of Representatives who was the co-founder and namesake of the unincorporated community of Keithville outside Shreveport in Caddo Parish in northwestern Louisiana.

Keithville came into existence when two railroads met on Keith properties in the early 1880s, the Texas and Pacific (T&P) and the Houston-Shreveport, later part of the Southern Pacific.

== Background ==
Keith was born near Macon, Georgia but settled in Caddo Parish when he was three months old with his parents, Henry David Keith and the former Mary Jones. On February 23, 1871, he married the former Narcissa Miller of Caddo Parish, the daughter of Mr. and Mrs. I. W. Miller. Their children were William Henry Keith (1875–1951), Daniel Wesley Keith (1875–1929), Perry P. Keith Jr. (1877–1941), David Keith (Perry's twin who died in infancy), Mary Slaughter Keith (1880–1931, never married), James Hardy Keith (born and died in 1883), Anna Beulah Keith Darby Cranfield (1885–1966, remarried after death of first husband) of Plaquemine, Louisiana, and Ray Cleveland Keith (died soon after birth in 1889).

== Political career ==
A Democrat, Keith served in the state house from 1912 to 1928. In his first term from 1912 to 1916, he served alongside David B. Samuel, later a long-term Shreveport city judge, and Lee Emmett Thomas, the Speaker of the Louisiana House of Representatives from Caddo Parish and later from 1922 to 1930 the mayor of Shreveport.

As a legislator, the taciturn Keith is believed to have made no speeches on the House floor during his entire tenure. Instead he became a "cue giver" whose judgment affected the votes of many of his colleagues on controversial issues. As chairman of the House Finance Committee during the administration of Governor John M. Parker from 1920 to 1924, Keith worked to maintain state finances on a sound footing and to treat all state agencies and commissions with fairness in regard to budgetary constraints.

Prior to his legislative years, Keith served eight years each on the Caddo Parish School Board and the parish governing body called the "police jury," since revamped as the Caddo Parish Commission.

== Personal life ==
The Methodist Keith donated the land for construction of what is now the Keithville United Methodist Church at 11145 Old Mansfield Road. Construction was begun in 1904 by Tom Hudnall, and the first service was held on October 4 of that year. The dedication took place in December 1905. The church installed a brass bell in its steeple. Originally used on a locomotive, the bell came from a plantation in Coushatta in Red River Parish. Keith was also active in the Masonic lodge, the Shriners, and Woodmen of the World.

Keith died at the age of eighty-seven after an illness of more than three months. Death came in the same modest house in which he had lived since 1854, when he was seven years of age. Services were held at the Keith residence, with ministers from Shreveport and Grand Cane officiating. Interment was at Keithville Cemetery.

Political offices
Preceded by At-large members: W. H. B. Croom; Henry Hunsicker; Leon R. Smith; Lee Emmett Thomas	Louisiana State Representative from Caddo Parish; 1912–1928	Succeeded by At-large members: Harvey S. Bogan; Reuben T. Douglas; Joseph B. Hamiter; Cecil Morgan Sr.
