= East Carroll Detention Center =

Parish jail in Louisiana, United States

East Carroll Parish Detention Center (ECPDC)
- Interactive map of East Carroll Parish Detention Center (ECPDC)
- Location: Lake Providence, Louisiana; 32°44′8″N 91°11′0″W

East Carroll Parish Detention Center is a parish jail in East Carroll Parish, Louisiana, housing more than 400 inmates at a time in the 1990s and 2000s.

In 1995, the Louisiana Department of Corrections conducted surprise inspections at East Carroll, and found that some inmates did unapproved work, kept and tested positive for marijuana use. In the 1990s, the jail was owned by East Carroll Corrections Systems, and operated by sheriff Dale Rinicker, while he was under indictment for mail fraud and money laundering. Rinicker pled guilty in 1997, and agreed to testify against Jack Wyly and Dorothy Morgel, the president and secretary of East Carroll Corrections Systems. All three were fined and served prison sentences.

In 2006, the jail had at least two escape incidents. The jail's warden John Gunter was fired in 2009. There were further escapes in 2010. Sheriff Mark Shumate closed the jail in 2012. The next sheriff, Wydette Williams, reopened the jail with a smaller population in February 2013.
