= Keithville, Louisiana =

Keithville
- Unincorporated community
- Hamlet of Keithville
- Location within Louisiana Location within the United States
- Coordinates: 32°20′00″N 93°50′11″W
- Country: United States
- States: Louisiana
- Parish: Caddo Parish
- Elevation: 197 ft (60 m)
- Time zone: UTC-6 (CST)
  - Summer (DST): UTC-5 (CDT)
- ZIP code: 71047
- Area code(s): 318
- GNIS feature ID: 536151

Keithville is an unincorporated community in Caddo Parish, Louisiana, United States. It lies to the south of Shreveport along U.S. Route 171. Although unincorporated, it has a post office, with the ZIP code of 71047.

== History ==
Keithville came into existence when two railroads, the Southern Pacific and the Houston-Shreveport, met on properties of the Keith brothers in the early 1880s. One of the Keith brothers was State Representative Perry Polk Keith, who served four terms from 1912 to 1928. A Methodist, Keith donated the land for construction of what is now the Keithville United Methodist in Keithville. Construction was begun in 1904 by Tom Hudnall, and the first service was held on October 4 of that year. The dedication took place in December 1905. The church installed a brass bell in its steeple. Originally used on a locomotive, the bell came from a plantation in Coushatta in Red River Parish.

== Economy ==
Louisiana Department of Public Safety and Corrections operated the Forcht-Wade Correctional Center in Keithville, located in the Eddie D. Jones Nature Park. It closed in July 2012.

== Education ==
The Caddo Parish School Board operates public schools.

- Keithville Elementary/Middle School

== Infrastructure ==
=== Major highways ===
- Interstate 49
- U.S. Route 171
- Louisiana Highway 169
- Louisiana Highway 525
- Louisiana Highway 789

== Notable people ==
- Sherri Smith Buffington, former state senator
- Claude King, country music singer and songwriter known for "Wolverton Mountain"
- Lenton Malry, first African American to serve in the New Mexico House of Representatives
- Keith Nale, two time contestant on "Survivor (American TV series)"
