= Wade Center =

The Wade Center can refer to one of the following:

- Marion E. Wade Center at Wheaton College (Illinois)
- David Wade Correctional Center (DWCC), a Louisiana Department of Public Safety and Corrections prison
- Forcht-Wade Correctional Center a state prison facility in unincorporated Caddo Parish, Louisiana
