= WDRC =

WDRC may refer to:

- WDRC (AM), a radio station (1360 AM) licensed to Hartford, Connecticut, United States
- WDRC-FM, a radio station (102.9 FM) licensed to Hartford, Connecticut, United States
- Wade Diagnostic and Reception Center, a facility of the Forcht-Wade Correctional Center prison in Louisiana, United States
