= Lakeview, Louisiana =

Lakeview
- Census-designated place
- Hamlet of Lakeview
- Location in Caddo Parish and the state of Louisiana.
- Coordinates: 32°31′26″N 93°49′47″W
- Country: United States
- State: Louisiana
- Parish: Caddo Parish

Area
  - Total: 0.83 sq mi (2.14 km^{2})
  - Land: 0.83 sq mi (2.14 km^{2})
  - Water: 0 sq mi (0.00 km^{2})
- Elevation: 187 ft (57 m)

Population (2020)
  - Total: 818
  - Density: 992.0/sq mi (383.01/km^{2})
- Time zone: UTC-6 (Central (CST))
  - Summer (DST): UTC-5 (CDT)
- Area code: 318
- GNIS feature ID: 2586691
- FIPS code: 22-41645

Lakeview is an unincorporated community and census-designated place (CDP) in Caddo Parish, Louisiana, United States. As of the 2020 census, Lakeview had a population of 818.

It is located on the north shore of Cross Lake 5 miles (8 km) northwest of downtown Shreveport. It is bordered by the city limits of Shreveport to the north, east, and south.

== Demographics ==
Historical population
Census	Pop.	Note	%±
2010	948		—
2020	818		−13.7%
U.S. Decennial Census

Lakeview was first listed as a census designated place in the 2010 U.S. census.

=== 2020 census ===
Lakeview CDP, Louisiana – Racial and ethnic composition Note: the U.S. census treats Hispanic/Latino as an ethnic category. This table excludes Latinos from the racial categories and assigns them to a separate category. Hispanics/Latinos may be of any race.
Race / Ethnicity (NH = Non-Hispanic)	Pop 2010	Pop 2020	% 2010	% 2020
White alone (NH)	643	509	67.83%	62.22%
Black or African American alone (NH)	243	225	25.63%	27.51%
Native American or Alaska Native alone (NH)	18	7	1.90%	0.86%
Asian alone (NH)	1	0	0.11%	0.00%
Native Hawaiian or Pacific Islander alone (NH)	0	0	0.00%	0.00%
Other race alone (NH)	0	3	0.00%	0.37%
Mixed race or Multiracial (NH)	5	31	0.53%	3.79%
Hispanic or Latino (any race)	38	43	4.01%	5.26%
Total	948	818	100.00%	100.00%

== Education ==
It is in the Caddo Parish School District.
