= Caddo Parish, Louisiana =

Parish in Louisiana, United States

Coordinates: 32.58°N 93.88°W

Caddo Parish
- Parish
- Parish of Caddo; Paroisse de Caddo (French)
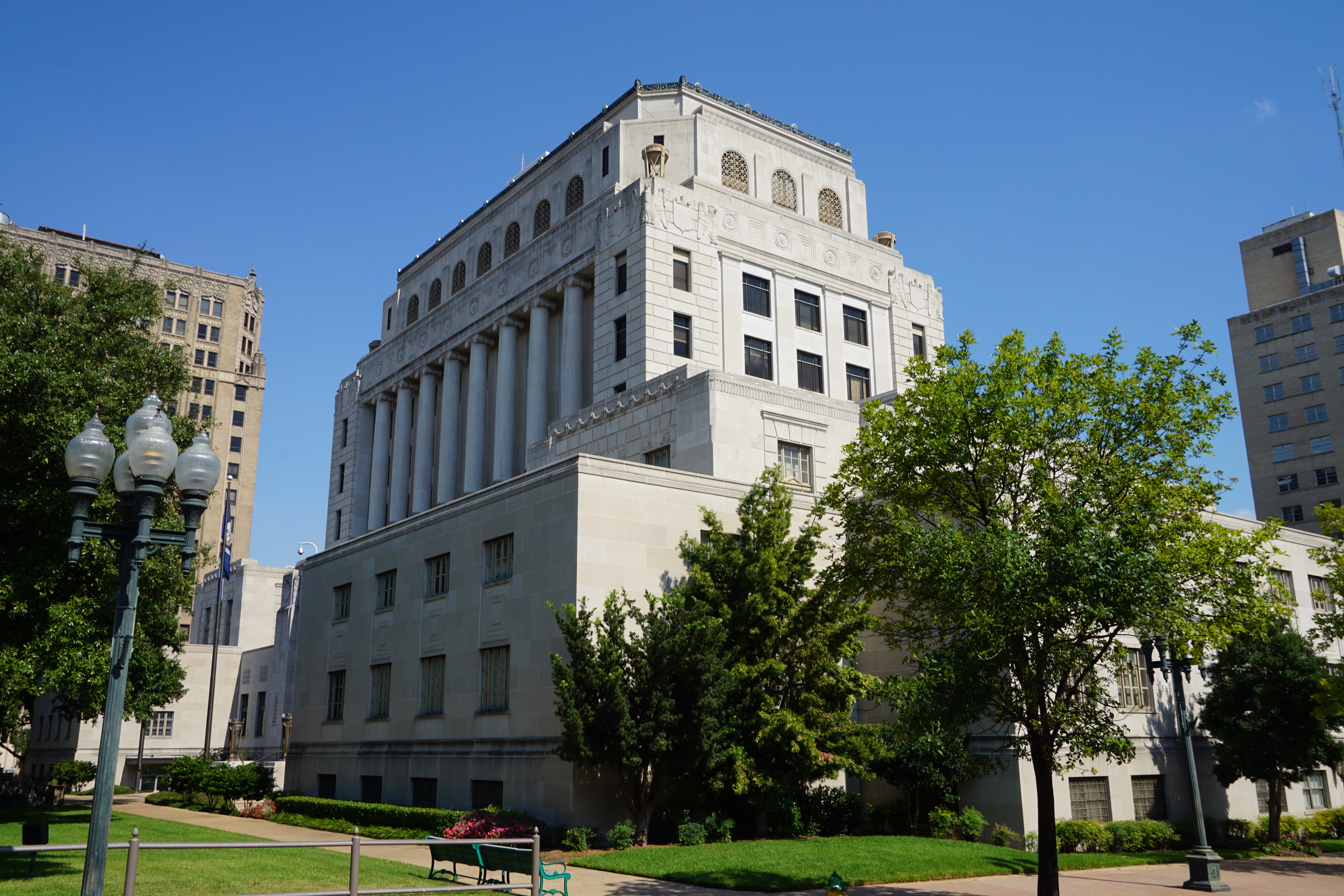
- Caddo Parish Courthouse in Shreveport

- Flag Seal

- Location within the U.S. state of Louisiana

- Louisiana's location within the U.S.
- Country: United States
- State: Louisiana
- Region: North
- Founded: January 18, 1838
- Named for: Caddo Native Americans
- Parish seat (and largest city): Shreveport
- Incorporated municipalities: 11 (total): 1 city, 5 towns, 5 villages; (located entirely or partially within parish boundaries)

Area
  - Total: 937 sq mi (2,430 km^{2})
  - Land: 879 sq mi (2,280 km^{2})
  - Water: 58 sq mi (150 km^{2})
  - percentage: 6.2 sq mi (16 km^{2})

Population (2020)
  - Total: 237,848
  - Estimate (2025): 224,226 ▼
  - Density: 271/sq mi (104/km^{2})
- Time zone: UTC-6 (CST)
  - Summer (DST): UTC-5 (CDT)
- Area code: 318
- Congressional district: 4th, 6th
- Website: official website

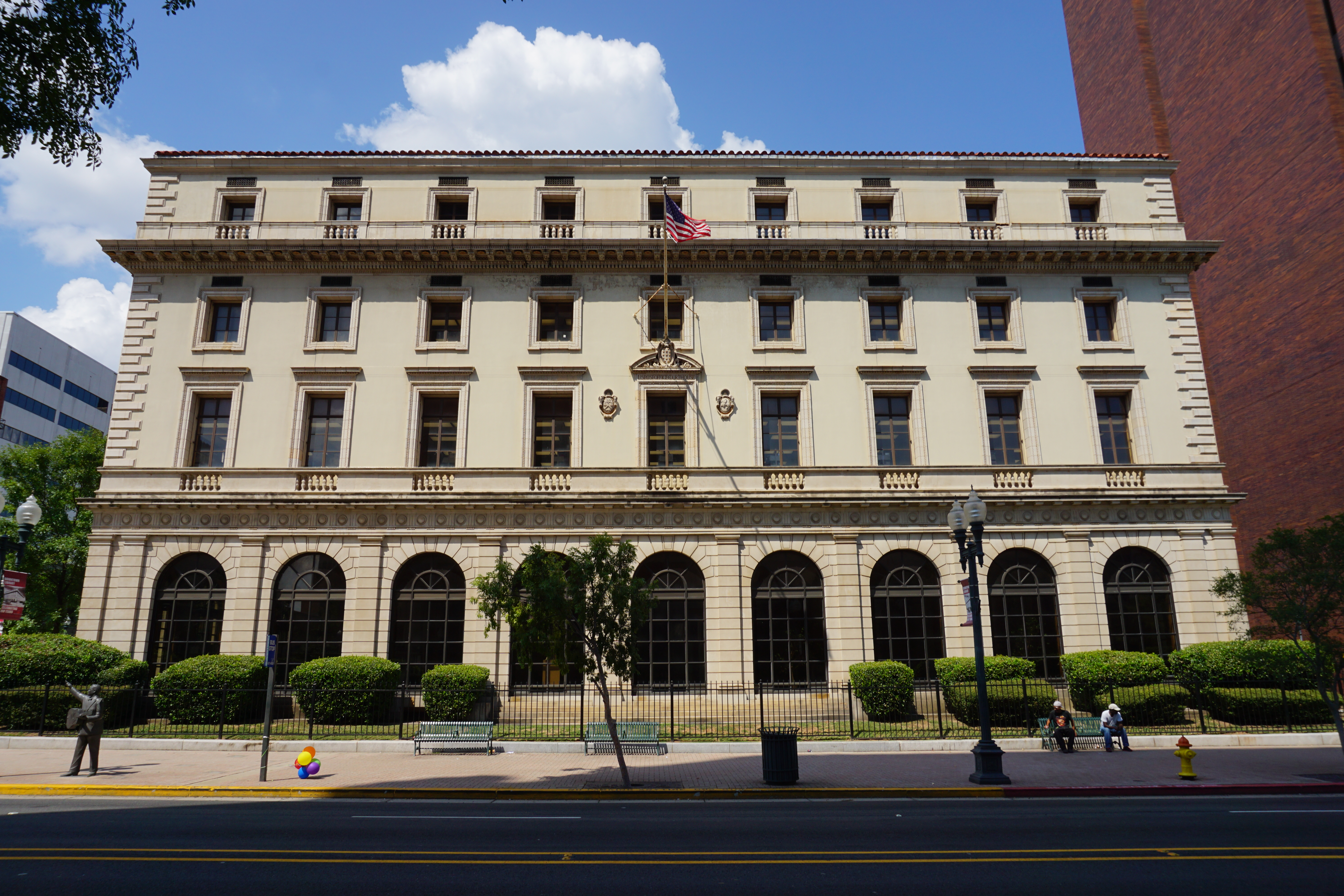
The Shreve Memorial Library in Shreveport located downtown in the former US post office and courthouse

Caddo Parish (/ˈkædoʊ/; French: Paroisse de Caddo) is a parish located in the northwestern corner of the U.S. state of Louisiana. According to the 2020 U.S. census, the parish had a population of 237,848. The parish seat and largest city is Shreveport, which developed along the Red River.

The city of Shreveport is the economic and cultural center for the tri-state region of the Ark-La-Tex containing Caddo Parish. Caddo Parish is included in the Shreveport–Bossier City metropolitan statistical area.

== History ==
In 1838, Caddo Parish was created by territory taken from Natchitoches Parish; the legislature named it for the indigenous Caddo Indians who had lived in the area. Most were forced out during Indian Removal in the 1830s.

With European-American development, the parish became a center of cotton plantations. Planters developed these along the waterways, with clearing and later cultivation and processing by thousands of enslaved African-American laborers. Shreveport, the parish seat, became a center of government, trade and law.

An armory was constructed in Shreveport before the American Civil War. This city served as the state capital after Union forces had seized Baton Rouge. Locals have referred to the armory as "Fort Humbug".

After the Civil War, and particularly after Reconstruction, whites in the parish used violence and intimidation against blacks to suppress Republican voting and re-establish white supremacy. The parishes in northwestern Louisiana had a high rate of violence and lynchings. From 1877 through the early 20th century, there were 48 lynchings of African Americans in Caddo Parish; this was the second-highest total in the state after Lafourche Parish, and nearly twice as high as the lowest parishes among the top six. The victims included Jennie Steers, a domestic servant hanged by a white lynch mob in July 1903, for allegedly poisoning her employer's daughter.

In 1920 the Daughters of the Confederacy, who were memorializing the Civil War, designated the armory as "Fort Turnball". During World War II, the government used it as a mobilization site for men who had been drafted and recruited.

In the early twentieth century, the oil industry developed here, with a concentration of related businesses in Shreveport. Numerous oil wells were constructed across southern Arkansas and northern Louisiana.

== Geography ==
According to the U.S. Census Bureau, the parish has a total area of 937 square miles (2,430 km^{2}), of which 978 square miles (2,530 km^{2}) is land and 58 square miles (150 km^{2}) (6.2%) is water.

=== Major highways ===
- Interstate 20
  - Interstate 220
- Interstate 49
- Future Interstate 69
- U.S. Highway 71
- U.S. Highway 79
- U.S. Highway 80
- U.S. Highway 171
- Louisiana Highway 1
- Louisiana Highway 2
- Louisiana Highway 168
- Louisiana Highway 169
- Louisiana Highway 170
- Louisiana Highway 173
- Louisiana Highway 175
- Louisiana Highway 511
- Louisiana Highway 523
- Louisiana Highway 525
- Louisiana Highway 526
- Louisiana Highway 530
- Louisiana Highway 538
- Louisiana Highway 767
- Louisiana Highway 789
- Louisiana Highway 3032
- Louisiana Highway 3036
- Louisiana Highway 3049
- Louisiana Highway 3094
- Louisiana Highway 3132
- Louisiana Highway 3194

=== Adjacent counties and parishes ===
- Miller County, Arkansas (north)
- Lafayette County, Arkansas (northeast)
- Bossier Parish (east)
- Red River Parish (southeast)
- De Soto Parish (south)
- Panola County, Texas (southwest)
- Harrison County, Texas (west)
- Marion County, Texas (west)
- Cass County, Texas (northwest)

=== National protected area ===
- Red River National Wildlife Refuge (part)

== Communities ==
=== City ===
- Shreveport (parish seat and largest municipality)

=== Towns ===
- Blanchard
- Greenwood
- Mooringsport
- Oil City
- Vivian

=== Villages ===
- Belcher
- Gilliam (smallest municipality)
- Hosston
- Ida
- Rodessa

=== Unincorporated areas ===
==== Census-designated place ====
- Lakeview

==== Other communities ====
- Bethany (partly in Panola County, Texas)
- Caspiana
- Conn
- Dixie
- Forbing
- Keithville
- Mira
- Mrytis
- North Rodessa
- Zylks

== Demographics ==
Historical population
Census	Pop.	Note	%±
1840	5,282		—
1850	8,884		68.2%
1860	12,140		36.7%
1870	21,714		78.9%
1880	26,296		21.1%
1890	31,555		20.0%
1900	44,499		41.0%
1910	58,200		30.8%
1920	83,265		43.1%
1930	124,670		49.7%
1940	150,203		20.5%
1950	176,547		17.5%
1960	223,859		26.8%
1970	230,184		2.8%
1980	252,358		9.6%
1990	248,253		−1.6%
2000	252,161		1.6%
2010	254,969		1.1%
2020	237,848		−6.7%
2025 (est.)	224,226	▼	−5.7%
U.S. Decennial Census; 1790-1960 1900-1990; 1990-2000 2010-2019

=== 2020 census ===
As of the 2020 census, the parish had a population of 237,848. The median age was 39.4 years, 23.3% of residents were under the age of 18, and 18.3% of residents were 65 years of age or older. For every 100 females there were 89.4 males, and for every 100 females age 18 and over there were 85.6 males age 18 and over.

The racial makeup of the parish was 43.5% White, 48.5% Black or African American, 0.5% American Indian and Alaska Native, 1.3% Asian, 0.1% Native Hawaiian and Pacific Islander, 1.6% from some other race, and 4.6% from two or more races. Hispanic or Latino residents of any race comprised 3.5% of the population.

84.0% of residents lived in urban areas, while 16.0% lived in rural areas.

There were 99,029 households in the parish, of which 29.5% had children under the age of 18 living in them. Of all households, 34.8% were married-couple households, 20.8% were households with a male householder and no spouse or partner present, and 38.1% were households with a female householder and no spouse or partner present. About 33.1% of all households were made up of individuals and 13.4% had someone living alone who was 65 years of age or older.

There were 112,323 housing units, of which 11.8% were vacant. Among occupied housing units, 60.5% were owner-occupied and 39.5% were renter-occupied. The homeowner vacancy rate was 2.0% and the rental vacancy rate was 11.8%.

=== Racial and ethnic composition ===
Caddo Parish, Louisiana – Racial and ethnic composition Note: the US Census treats Hispanic/Latino as an ethnic category. This table excludes Latinos from the racial categories and assigns them to a separate category. Hispanics/Latinos may be of any race.
Race / Ethnicity (NH = Non-Hispanic)	Pop 1980	Pop 1990	Pop 2000	Pop 2010	Pop 2020	% 1980	% 1990	% 2000	% 2010	% 2020
White alone (NH)	153,467	144,885	131,527	121,969	101,727	60.81%	58.36%	52.16%	47.84%	42.77%
Black or African American alone (NH)	94,023	99,101	111,984	119,697	114,769	37.26%	39.92%	44.41%	46.95%	48.25%
Native American or Alaska Native alone (NH)	387	516	904	976	895	0.15%	0.21%	0.36%	0.38%	0.38%
Asian alone (NH)	844	1,095	1,718	2,653	3,179	0.33%	0.44%	0.68%	1.04%	1.34%
Native Hawaiian or Pacific Islander alone (NH)	x	x	65	118	120	x	x	0.03%	0.05%	0.05%
Other race alone (NH)	259	61	169	246	856	0.10%	0.02%	0.07%	0.10%	0.36%
Mixed race or Multiracial (NH)	x	x	2,044	3,181	7,921	x	x	0.81%	1.25%	3.33%
Hispanic or Latino (any race)	3,378	2,595	3,750	6,129	8,381	1.34%	1.05%	1.49%	2.40%	3.52%
Total	252,358	248,253	252,161	254,969	237,848	100.00%	100.00%	100.00%	100.00%	100.00%

=== 2010 census ===
At the 2010 United States census, there were 254,969 people, 119,502 households, and 68,900 families residing in the parish. In 2010, there were 119,502 households, out of which 30.90% had children under the age of 18 living with them, 42.20% were married couples living together, 19.80% had a female householder with no husband present, and 33.70% were non-families. A total of 28.90% of all households were made up of individuals, and 10.50% had someone living alone who was 65 years of age or older. The average household size was 2.51 and the average family size was 3.11. As of 2010, the population density was 286 inhabitants per square mile (110/km^{2}).

At the 2010 census, the parish population was spread out, with 26.80% under the age of 18, 10.20% from 18 to 24, 27.40% from 25 to 44, 22.00% from 45 to 64, and 13.70% who were 65 years of age or older. The median age was 35 years. For every 100 females there were 89.70 males. For every 100 females age 18 and over, there were 84.90 males.

== Economy ==
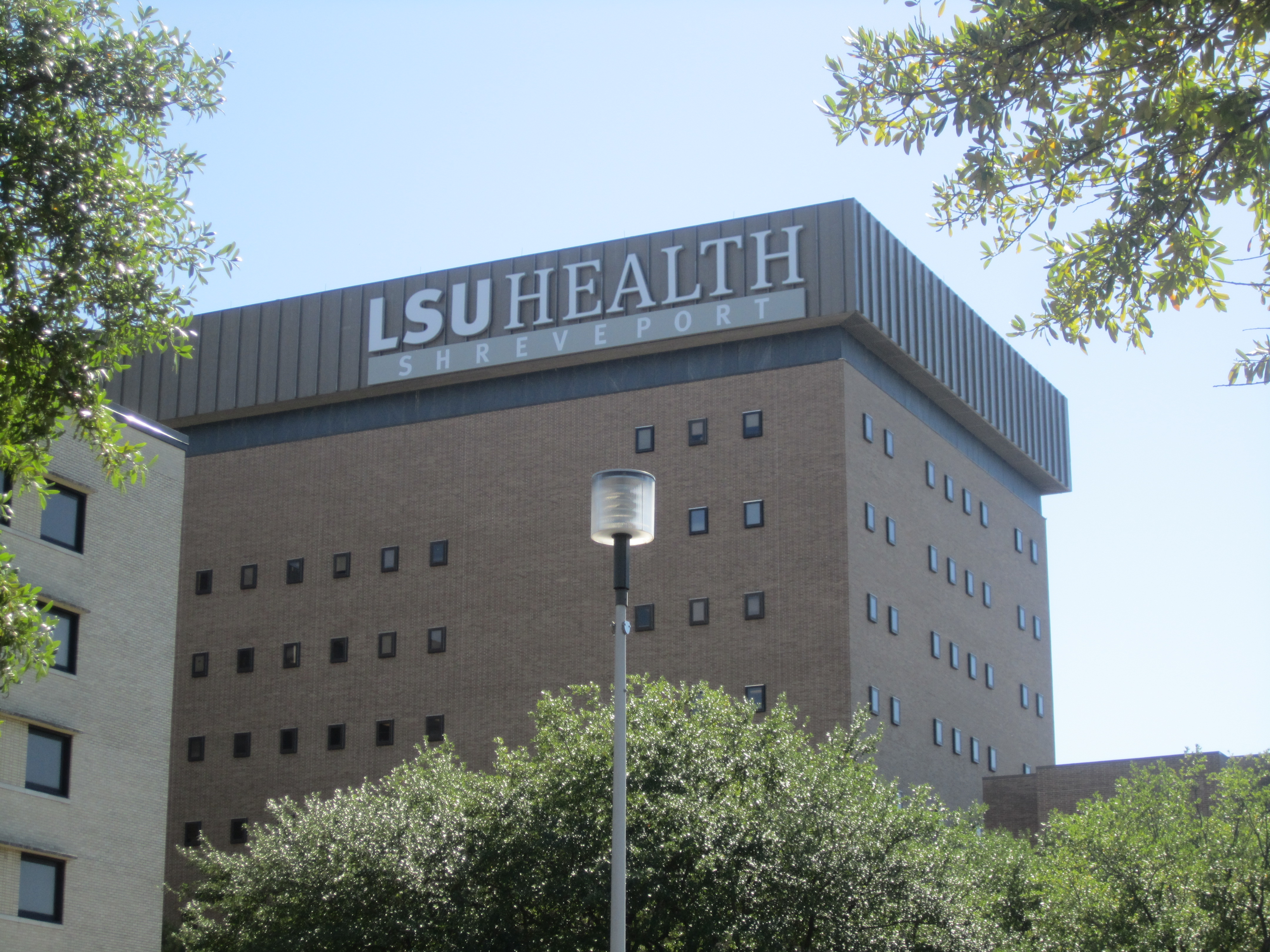
LSU Health Sciences Center, Shreveport

The economy of the parish is primarily centered in the city of Shreveport, with international corporations including Amazon and Walmart stimulating the economy alongside nationwide chains such as Best Buy, Target, and others. While maintaining these companies in the parish, however, Caddo includes some of the poorest areas in Louisiana by ZIP code. Statistics from 2014 show West Shreveport (71103) was the poorest ZIP code in the state with a per capita income of just $22,267; Queensborough, Shreveport (71109) was the fourth-poorest with $24,966; Caddo Heights/South Highlands (71108) was the fifth-poorest with $25,334; and Rodessa (71069) was the twenty-fourth-poorest with $34,346. In 2020, an estimated 22.9% of the parish population lived at or below the poverty line with 33.9% of its impoverished population being under 18 years of age.

Parishwide, the median household income was $42,003 as of 2020's American Community Survey; families had a median income of $55,719; married-couple families $81,114; and nonfamily households $26,204. Despite the poverty within the parish, however, the Shreveport–Bossier City metropolitan statistical area and entire Northwest Louisiana region gained three projects valued at over $750 million in the early 2020s to offset its population and economic decline, and increase recognition.

The largest employers in the region as of 2017 were:

	Employer	Employees	Note
1	Caddo Parish Public Schools (CPPS)	9,416	
2	Willis-Knighton Medical Center	6,732	
3	University Health	6,372	
4	LSU Health Shreveport	2,762	
5	City of Shreveport	2,569	

== Law and government ==
As parish seat, Shreveport is the site of the parish courthouse. Caddo Parish comprises the 1st Judicial District. Located downtown on Texas Street, the courthouse contains both civil and criminal courts. The current elected judges are: Ramon Lafitte, Craig O. Marcotte, Michael A. Pitman, Karelia R. Stewart, Robert P. Waddell, Erin Leigh W. Garrett, Katherine C. Dorroh, John Mosely Jr., Brady O'Callaghan, Ramona Emanuel, Charles G. Tutt, and Roy Brun. The Clerk of Court is Mike Spence. Caddo Parish like all parishes in Louisiana utilizes Justices of the Peace and Constables particularly when civil suits below $5,000 or an eviction has been filed.

Caddo Parish has the highest rate of death penalty convictions in the United States.

== Politics ==
United States presidential election results for Caddo Parish, Louisiana
Year	Republican		Democratic		Third party(ies)	
Year	No.	%	No.	%	No.	%
1912	34	1.55%	1,946	88.45%	220	10.00%
1916	151	4.63%	3,109	95.25%	4	0.12%
1920	401	8.60%	4,264	91.40%	0	0.00%
1924	1,062	17.73%	4,517	75.41%	411	6.86%
1928	3,665	34.58%	6,934	65.42%	0	0.00%
1932	1,309	9.66%	12,159	89.71%	85	0.63%
1936	1,697	12.25%	12,156	87.72%	4	0.03%
1940	3,124	15.36%	17,192	84.50%	29	0.14%
1944	5,885	31.29%	12,896	68.56%	29	0.15%
1948	4,777	21.60%	5,985	27.06%	11,355	51.34%
1952	27,850	65.68%	14,554	34.32%	0	0.00%
1956	23,432	60.32%	10,780	27.75%	4,637	11.94%
1960	25,139	54.29%	11,481	24.80%	9,681	20.91%
1964	42,197	80.60%	10,158	19.40%	0	0.00%
1968	21,224	31.51%	17,675	26.24%	28,463	42.25%
1972	47,215	71.68%	15,649	23.76%	3,003	4.56%
1976	42,627	57.34%	30,593	41.15%	1,120	1.51%
1980	51,202	57.41%	36,422	40.84%	1,560	1.75%
1984	63,429	63.68%	35,727	35.87%	445	0.45%
1988	54,498	57.73%	39,204	41.53%	700	0.74%
1992	42,665	41.55%	47,733	46.49%	12,280	11.96%
1996	38,445	38.69%	55,543	55.89%	5,391	5.42%
2000	46,807	48.94%	47,530	49.70%	1,302	1.36%
2004	54,292	50.93%	51,739	48.54%	564	0.53%
2008	52,228	48.07%	55,536	51.11%	896	0.82%
2012	52,459	46.94%	58,042	51.93%	1,264	1.13%
2016	49,006	46.32%	53,483	50.55%	3,315	3.13%
2020	48,021	45.77%	55,110	52.53%	1,781	1.70%
2024	44,471	46.96%	48,864	51.60%	1,364	1.44%

Since the late 20th century, most conservative whites in Louisiana have shifted into the Republican Party. Politics largely follows ethnic patterns, as most African Americans have supported national Democratic candidates since regaining the power to vote and other civil rights under Democratic national administrations. Some urban liberal whites also vote Democratic. Since 1992, Caddo Parish has voted for the Democratic nominee in presidential campaigns except for 2004 when George W. Bush won the parish narrowly over John Kerry. Notably the city of Shreveport is the base for Democratic strength, while surrounding white-majority suburban areas are aligned with the Republican Party.

== Education ==
The Caddo Parish School Board, which operates public schools, covers the entire parish.

The parish also has fourteen private schools as of 2018. It is in the service area of Bossier Parish Community College, though the private Centenary College of Louisiana and LSU's Shreveport campus are also prominent institutions of higher education.

== Correction center ==
The Louisiana Department of Public Safety & Corrections operated the Forcht-Wade Correctional Center in Keithville, an unincorporated section of Caddo Parish. As the state succeeded in reducing the number of prisoners, it closed this facility in July 2012.

The Caddo Correctional Center is a full-service parish jail rated at a capacity of 1,500 beds. Constructed in 1994, this facility was designed to successfully manage a large number of inmates with a minimum of personnel. The Caddo Correctional Center is the largest jail in the Ark-La-Tex and the only "direct supervision" facility in the state.

== See also ==
- National Register of Historic Places listings in Caddo Parish, Louisiana
- USS Caddo Parish (LST-515)
- Jasper K. Smith, former member of the Louisiana House of Representatives 1944–1948 and 1952–1964, and former city attorney of Vivian
