= Jetson Center for Youth =

Juvenile prison in East Baton Rouge Parish, Louisiana, USA

Louis Jetson Center for Youth
- Interactive map of Louis Jetson Center for Youth
- Location: Unincorporated East Baton Rouge Parish, Louisiana, Louisiana, United States; 30.5843°N 91.2060°W
- Status: Closed
- Opened: October 1, 1948
- Closed: January 26, 2014
- Managed by: Formerly: Louisiana Department of Corrections, Louisiana Office of Juvenile Justice
- Website: Jetson Center for Youth Archived 2016-03-03 at the Wayback Machine

Louis Jetson Center for Youth (JCY) is a former juvenile correctional facility in unincorporated East Baton Rouge Parish, Louisiana, near Baton Rouge and Baker. It as previously referred to as "Scotlandville" after the nearby community. It was operated by the Louisiana Department of Corrections and later by the Louisiana Office of Juvenile Justice (OJJ). Scenic Alternative High School was located at Jetson.

It was named after a humanitarian and activist named Louis Jetson.

== History ==
On October 1, 1948 the State Industrial School for Colored Youth, established that year by the Louisiana Legislature, opened. The school's budget was $150,000, and it had 11 employees and a single prisoner. Campaigning for a correctional facility for black children began when the Louisiana Colored Teachers Association president did so in 1900, and in the 1920s civic groups also began asking for such a facility. Even though the Louisiana Legislature established a correctional facility for black children in 1928, it never opened because the legislature did not give any money to fund it.

In 1956 the facility began housing both boys and girls. In 1969 racial desegregation occurred and the name became Louisiana Training Institute–East Baton Rouge (LTI). It became known as the "Louis Jetson Correctional Center for Youth", and then the "Louis Jetson Center for Youth", in 1995 and 2005, respectively.

The Louisiana Legislature had ordered Jetson closed by June 30, 2009. This decision was praised by The New York Times Editorial Board. Instead the center remained open, and after downsizing, it kept its name. At the end of the facility's life, only a portion of the campus was in use. 76 inmates were at Jetson prior to its closure.

The center closed on January 26, 2014. The prisoners were transferred to Bridge City and Swanson early that morning. The decision was not announced in advance. OJJ Secretary Mary Livers later apologized for the secrecy of the closing. The cited reasons for closing the facility included the existence of newer facilities and the difficulty of managing inmates on the outdated and large Jetson property. Months later, Louisiana authorities announced intentions to rebuild and reopen Jetson.

By September 2016 the prisoners displaced from the Louisiana Correctional Institute for Women (LCIW) in St. Gabriel who were moved to the former Phelps Correctional Center near DeQuincy were transferred to the former JCY. Up until 2025 Jetson continued to house LCIW prisoners as well as the LCIW administration.

== Notable inmates ==
Adult LCIW prisoners at the former Jetson:

- Amy Hebert - Murdered her two children

== See also ==
- "Workers at Jetson Center for Youth in Limbo". WAFB. 2014-02-04.

== Notes ==
- Much of the content originated from Louisiana Office of Juvenile Justice
