= Louisiana Correctional Institute for Women =

Women's state prison in St. Gabriel, Louisiana, United States

Coordinates: 30°15′47″N 91°04′23″W

- Interactive map of Louisiana Correctional Institute for Women
- Location: 6923 Hwy 74, St. Gabriel, Louisiana 70776
- Status: Open
- Security class: mixed
- Capacity: 1100
- Opened: 1961
- Managed by: Louisiana Department of Public Safety & Corrections
- Warden: Kristen Thomas
- Website: https://doc.la.gov/location/louisiana-correctional-institute-for-women/

Louisiana Correctional Institute for Women (LCIW) is the state's only female correctional facility, located in St. Gabriel, Louisiana, operated by the Louisiana Department of Public Safety and Corrections. Elayn Hunt Correctional Center is immediately west of LCIW. Its history dates back to the 1880s, when women convicted of felonies were sentenced to hard labor at a women’s camp within the Louisiana State Penitentiary (LSP).Over time, the institution has evolved, expanding rehabilitation opportunities while remaining committed to its core mission of public safety.

== History and Relocation ==
In 1961 the Louisiana Correctional Institute for Women opened on the grounds of a former prison farm camp. Female inmates were moved from the Louisiana State Penitentiary (Angola) to LCIW. A 200 bed dormitory intended to alleviate an overcrowding of female prisoners was scheduled to open in the northern hemisphere spring of 1995. In 1995 the state received federal approval for its plan to double-bunk inmates. That way the state could transfer state-sentenced female prisoners who were held in parish jails to the women's prison. The television special 900 Women: Inside St. Gabriel's Prison is about the women inside the facility.

=== 2016 flooding ===
In August 2016 the facility, which had 985 prisoners, experienced flooding, ranging from 8 in (20.3 cm) to 3 ft (0.91 m). LCIW, the only state-operated prison to receive flooding during that incident, temporarily closed. It was the first time in state history that the whole population of a particular prison was evacuated to other facilities. The chapel and one other building did not flood.

LCIW prisoners were immediately transferred to the former C. Paul Phelps Correctional Center a facility near DeQuincy, which received 678 prisoners; the private Louisiana Transitional Center for Women in Tallulah, which received 221 prisoners; Avoyelles Parish Jail in Marksville, which received 47 prisoners; and Angola, which received 39 prisoners. By September the prisoners housed near DeQuincy were transferred to the former Jetson Youth Center, a youth prison near Baker which closed in 2014. As of 2017 the prisoners are divided between Jetson, where the administration of LCIW is temporarily located; Angola; and Elayn Hunt.

As of 2019 the prison remained closed as the Federal Emergency Management Agency (FEMA) had not yet determined how much of the facility sustained damage; once this is done the state plans to raze the flooded buildings as it determined that demolition is more cost effective. The new prison will cost about $100 million, with $36.2 million provided by FEMA. It will be somewhat smaller than the former facility and about 0.5 miles (0.80 km) from the original location.

In 2020 the COVID-19 pandemic in Louisiana affected various temporary facilities housing LCIW prisoners, many of which were more cramped than the previous LCIW prison.

Construction began on the replacement prison in St. Gabriel in 2022. A ribbon-cutting ceremony was held in August 2025.

== Facility ==
The pre-2016 prison had two per room prison cells as the form. Prison toilets and showers had individual stalls.

== Demographics ==
As of circa the 2010s the prison has about 1,100 prisoners. 80% of the prisoners had children. Only 126 of the prisoners had sentences of six or fewer years, 126 had life sentences, and two had death sentences. Many prisoners were convicted of drug use and/or of prostitution, as Louisiana law treats prostitution as a sexual offense.

== Programs ==
The prison has the Program for Caring Parents and the Christmas Extravaganza, and in 2016 women were allowed to participate in some programs offered by Hunt Correctional Center.

In 2011, a campus of the New Orleans Baptist Theological Seminary was established in the penitentiary.

The prison offers wellness programs for inmates, like high-impact aerobics, physical therapy, Spanish dance, grow a plant, and wellness group.

The drama program is illustrated in the book See Me and the chapter "Life and Love in the LCIW Drama Club". The chapter follows Mama Glo and her experience in the drama program.

== Notable inmates ==
Death row

- Antoinette Frank - Former police officer with the New Orleans Police Department (NOPD), who was charged and convicted of three counts of first-degree murder. Sentenced to death.

Non-death row:

- Amy Hebert - Convicted of murdering her two children. She was held at LCIW as a pretrial inmate since Lafourche Parish lacked adequate facilities for female inmates who needed medical care, and she remained at LCIW as a sentenced felon. As of 2019 she was held at the Jetson facility.
