= Allen Correctional Center =

Prison located in Allen Parish, Louisiana

Coordinates: 30°33′47″N 92°47′25″W

Allen Correctional Center (ACC)
- Interactive map of Allen Correctional Center (ACC)
- Location: Kinder, Allen Parish, Louisiana
- Status: Open
- Capacity: 1538
- Opened: 1990
- Managed by: Louisiana department of corrections

not to be confused with the Allen Correctional Institution, Lima, Ohio

Allen Correctional Center is a state prison in Allen Parish, Louisiana, United States. It is operated by the Louisiana Department of Public Safety and Corrections. The Louisiana Department of Corrections built the prison, which opened in December 1990, for $27 million.
