= Vince Marinello =

American sportscaster (died 2020)

Vincent Joseph Marinello (1938/1939 – February 21, 2020) was an American longtime sportscaster who was featured on WWL AM/FM radio and, previously, on WVUE and WDSU in New Orleans, Louisiana. He was later known as a leading media personality, covering aspects of the recovery of the city from the devastation following Hurricane Katrina. Before his arrest for the murder of his third wife, he served as an in-house television host and analyst at the Fair Grounds Race Course from 1990 until 2005. Marinello died in custody at Dixon Correctional Institute on February 21, 2020 of natural causes.

His case is featured in the Season 3, Episode 10, titled ‘’Louisiana’s Lost Souls’’, from the show, ‘’Deadly Sins’’.

== Mary Elizabeth Marinello murder case ==
On August 31, 2006, Marinello's estranged wife, Mary Elizabeth, was shot twice in the face in the parking lot of an office tower in Metairie, Louisiana. Jefferson Parish Sheriff's authorities initially announced their belief that the murder was a result of a botched robbery.

Marinello voluntarily met with sheriff's investigators and initially denied any connection to the murder of his estranged wife, saying he was in Jackson, Mississippi. On September 7, he voluntarily turned himself in to the Jefferson Parish Sheriff's Department's main office in Gretna, Louisiana. He was subsequently arrested and charged with second-degree murder in the killing of his wife, who filed for a contentious divorce after she discovered he was not legally divorced when they wed. On the night of September 11, 2006, Marinello posted a $250,000 bond and was released from jail.

Detectives believed that Marinello himself committed the crime by staking out the Metairie office tower where Mary Elizabeth regularly saw a counselor, allegedly donning a false beard and mustache and shooting her twice in the face with a .38 caliber pistol.

Surveillance video around the scene of the crime recorded a figure matching the description of a suspicious person seen leaving the scene on a bicycle. The surveillance video showed a 15-minute sequence of images of a man fitting the description of the disguised Marinello pacing back and forth in the parking lot. The suspicious person was described as a scruffy-looking white male with a beard and a dark complexion and was reportedly seen loading a bicycle into a white Taurus matching the description of a vehicle seen leaving the crime scene; a white Taurus was later found outside Marinello's residence.

The key piece of evidence leading to charges was a sheet of paper with notes and a diagram found in Marinello's FEMA trailer during the execution of a search warrant several days after the crime. This was characterized as a checklist or to-do list for the murder and its aftermath, and contained written notes about a gun and its disposal, a bike and a disguise. It was determined that Marinello recently purchased a disguise and had purchased bullets for a .38 caliber gun. The nylon-coated bullets purchased by Marinello were unusual and were of the same kind as those found in Mary Elizabeth's body.

Marinello's alibi that he was in Jackson, Mississippi at 6:30 p.m., watching the football game with friends, was undermined when the acquaintances said he actually did not show up until after kickoff at 7:30. This allowed for the possibility that Marinello was in Old Metairie at the time of his wife's murder, around 4:00 p.m.

Marinello's attorneys sought and received a change of venue for the trial claiming that Marinello would not be able to receive a fair trial at home due to the publicity surrounding the case. The trial was then moved from Jefferson Parish, Louisiana to Lafayette Parish, Louisiana.

After two weeks in court, and after testifying himself in an effort to explain his actions and some of the evidence in the case (such as the handwritten "to do list" found in his abode after the murder), on December 13, 2008, the jury found Marinello guilty of second degree murder after 90 minutes of deliberation. In Louisiana, a conviction for this charge carries a mandatory sentence of life imprisonment without parole.

Marinello subsequently appealed his conviction. It was upheld by the Louisiana Third Circuit Court of Appeals, and the Louisiana Supreme Court declined to hear his appeal.
