= Zylks, Louisiana =

Unincorporated community in Louisiana, US

- Unincorporated community
- Location within Louisiana Location within the United States
- Coordinates: 33°00′06″N 94°00′42″W
- Country: United States
- State: Louisiana
- Parish: Caddo
- Elevation: 210 ft (64 m)
- Time zone: UTC-6 (Central (CST))
  - Summer (DST): UTC-5 (CDT)
- ZIP code: 71069
- Area code: 318
- GNIS feature ID: 540612

Zylks is an unincorporated community in Caddo Parish, Louisiana, United States. Zylks is located on Louisiana Highway 1 and the Kansas City Southern Railway in the northwestern corner of the parish, 2.3 miles (3.7 km) north-northwest of Rodessa. The community is in the Mid-Continent oil province and is near the tripoint Louisiana border with Texas and Arkansas.

== History ==
The railroad through Zylks area dates to the late 19th century. In an opinion issued in 1938, the Louisiana Supreme Court said Jacob Kaempfer granted a right of way through property in Section 9, Township 23 North, Range 16 West, to the Kansas City, Shreveport & Gulf Railway Company in 1895. The court identified that railway as the same as the Kansas City Southern Railway Company and said the railroad tracks still ran through the property at the time of the case.

=== Oil field activity ===
Zylks was associated with development of the Rodessa Oil Field in the Mid-Continent oil province in the 1930s and later included Carter Oil Company wells on the S. G. Zylks property. Carter Oil Company's S. G. Zylks Well No. 2 was completed on August 23, 1937, with a total depth of 5,964 feet (1,818 m) and initial production of 364 barrels per day. Well No. 1 was completed on August 25, 1937, with a total depth of 5,950 feet (1,810 m) and initial production of 374 barrels per day.
