= Cecil Morgan =

American politician (1898–1999)

Cecil Morgan Sr.
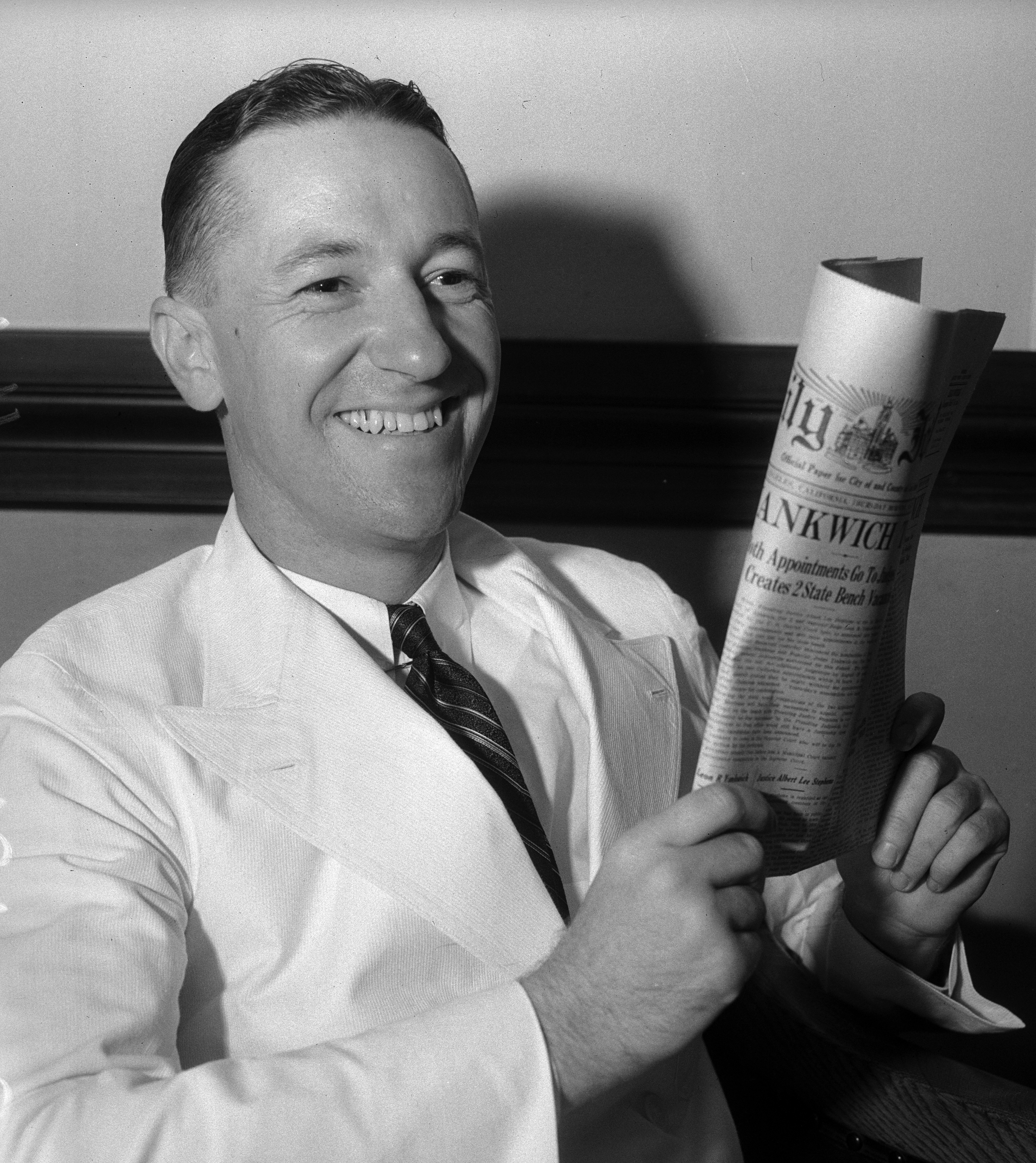
- Morgan in 1935

Member of the Louisiana State Senate for Caddo Parish
- In office 1932–1934
- Preceded by: William Pike Hall Sr. John M. Wynn
- Succeeded by: Roscoe C. Cranor

Member of the Louisiana House of Representatives for Caddo Parish
- In office 1928–1932
- Preceded by: Reuben T. Douglas Perry Keith; Marion K. Smith John M. Wynn
- Succeeded by: P. T. Alexander William J. B. Chandler; Joseph B. Hamiter Rupert Peyton

Personal details
- Born: August 20, 1898 Omaha-Winnebago Indian Reservation, Nebraska
- Died: June 14, 1999 (aged 100) New Orleans, Louisiana, U.S.
- Relations: Philip H. Morgan (great-uncle); Sarah Morgan (great-aunt); Richard Howell (3rd great-grandfather)
- Children: 2
- Education: Louisiana State University Law Center

Cecil Morgan Sr. (August 20, 1898 – June 14, 1999) was an American politician in the state of Louisiana who served in the Louisiana House of Representatives and Louisiana State Senate.
