= C. Paul Phelps Correctional Center =

Prison in Louisiana, United States

Coordinates: 30°29′51″N 93°25′56″W

C. Paul Phelps Correctional Center (PCC) was a Louisiana Department of Public Safety & Corrections prison for men, located in unincorporated Beauregard Parish, Louisiana, about 3 miles (4.8 km) north of DeQuincy and 30 miles (48 km) northwest of Lake Charles. The center was located on Louisiana Highway 27. It had a capacity of 942 prisoners and was a medium security facility.

== History ==
In September 2012 the State of Louisiana announced that Phelps was closing. The state said that prisoners would likely be transferred to Louisiana State Penitentiary (Angola) and Elayn Hunt Correctional Center. The state said that the closure would save over $2.6 million in the current fiscal year and about $11.85 million in the 2013-2014 fiscal year. Elona Weston of KPLC-TV said "PCC was reportedly chosen for consolidation because the offenders there can be accommodated at other facilities easily since PCC does not house maximum security offenders or offenders in infirmary beds." Kenny Naquin, an individual quoted in an Associated Press article, said that he estimated that within an 18-month period prior to the closure announcement, $1 million in improvements had been made to the prison property. The facility was closed on November 1, 2012.

1,000 Phelps prisoners were transferred to the Louisiana State Penitentiary (Angola) in West Feliciana Parish. The state government did not increase Angola's budget, nor did it hire additional employees.

In 2015 the Beauregard Parish Sherriff Office Leased the Facility, still owned by the state government, to a Private Owner. It was repurposed as a Transitional Work Release Program. This program was designed as a way to help offenders nearing the end of their time served to reintegrate into society. They are offered GED Classes and Welding instruction, then are allowed to hold jobs to help build their bank accounts. This provides a cushion when they are released so they do not relapse back into the system. Louisiana Workforce LCC operates the program, which operated in the rear portion of the facility.

In August 2016 678 prisoners from the Louisiana Correctional Institute for Women (LCIW) in St. Gabriel were transferred to C. Paul Phelps because LCIW flooded during the 2016 Louisiana floods. They were housed in a different area from the work release portion. By September the female prisoners at Phelps were transferred to the former Jetson Youth Center, a youth prison near Baker which closed in 2014.

== Notable inmates ==
- Billy Sinclair (prison journalist)
