= Bridge City, Louisiana =

- Census-designated place
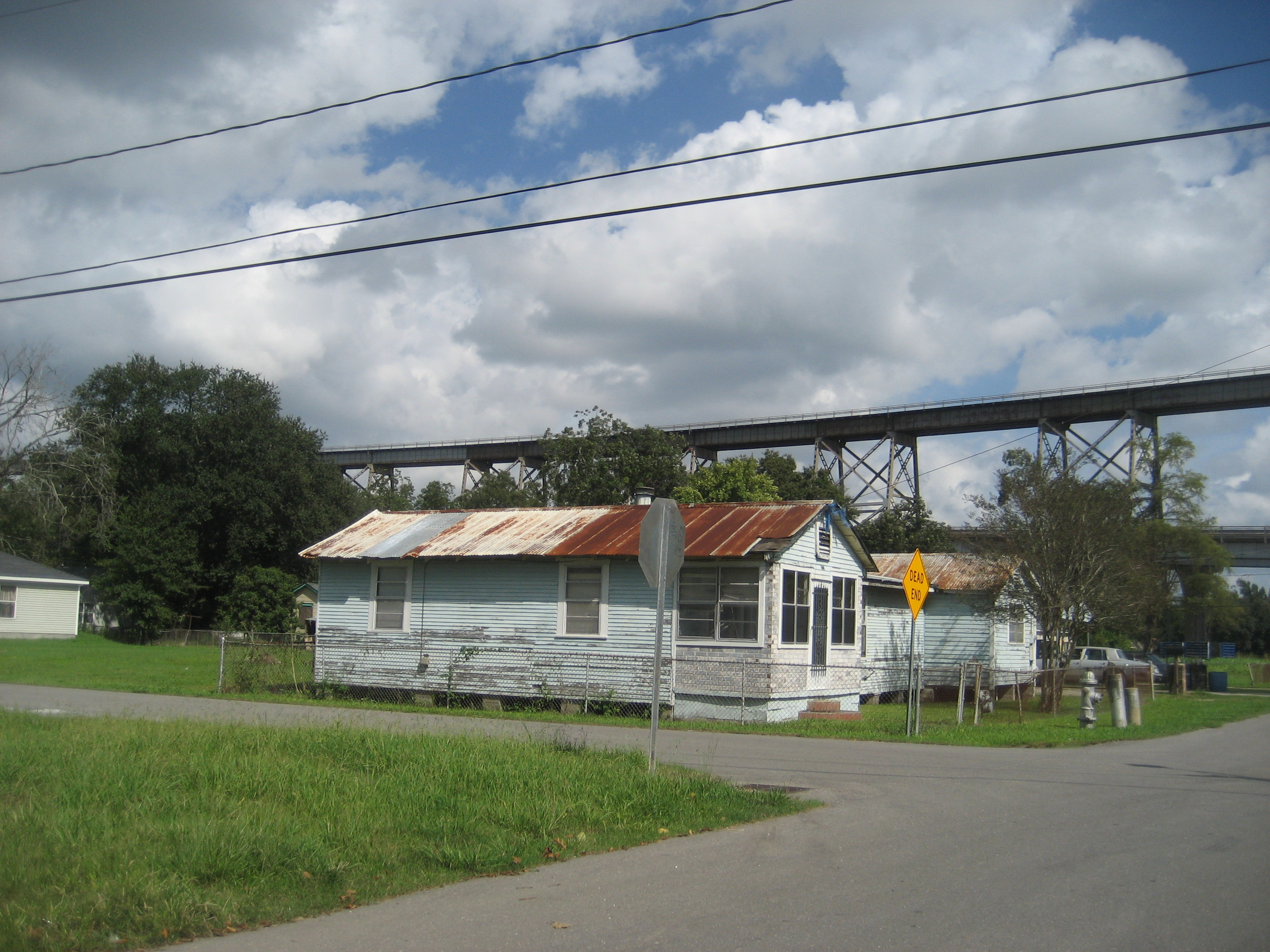

- Location of Bridge City in Louisiana
- Coordinates: 29°55′26″N 90°09′58″W
- Country: United States
- State: Louisiana
- Parish: Jefferson

Area
  - Total: 5.24 sq mi (13.58 km^{2})
  - Land: 4.18 sq mi (10.83 km^{2})
  - Water: 1.07 sq mi (2.76 km^{2})
- Elevation: 3 ft (0.91 m)

Population (2020)
  - Total: 7,219
  - Density: 1,726.9/sq mi (666.77/km^{2})
- Time zone: UTC-6 (CST)
  - Summer (DST): UTC-5 (CDT)
- ZIP Code: 70094
- Area code: 504
- FIPS code: 22-09480

Bridge City is an unincorporated community and census-designated place (CDP) in Jefferson Parish, Louisiana, United States. It was established in the 1930s during the construction of the Huey P. Long Bridge over the Mississippi River. The town is located on the south side (referred to as the "West Bank") of the river. It is part of the New Orleans–Metairie–Kenner metropolitan statistical area.

The Bridge City CDP population was 7,706 at the 2010 census. At the 2019 American Community Survey, its population declined to 6,602 residents. The population of Bridge City rebounded to 7,219 in 2020.

== Geography ==
Bridge City is located on the east side of Jefferson Parish at 29°55′26″N 90°9′58″W (29.923956, -90.166030). The community is bordered to the northeast, across the Mississippi, by New Orleans in Orleans Parish. The remaining neighbors of Bridge City are all within Jefferson Parish: Elmwood and Jefferson to the north across the Mississippi, Avondale to the southwest, and Westwego to the southeast. Via the Huey P. Long Bridge carrying US 90, downtown New Orleans is 10 miles (16 km) to the northeast.

According to the United States Census Bureau, the Bridge City CDP has a total area of 5.3 square miles (13.6 km^{2}), of which 4.2 square miles (10.8 km^{2}) are land and 1.1 square miles (2.8 km^{2}), or 20.30%, are water. Bridge City is the home of the Avondale Shipyard.

== Demographics ==
Historical population
Census	Pop.	Note	%±
1990	8,327		—
2000	8,323		0.0%
2010	7,706		−7.4%
2020	7,219		−6.3%
U.S. Decennial Census; 1950 1960 1970 1980; 1990 2000 2010

Bridge City first appeared as a census designated place in the 1990 U.S. census.

Bridge City CDP, Louisiana – Racial and ethnic composition Note: the US Census treats Hispanic/Latino as an ethnic category. This table excludes Latinos from the racial categories and assigns them to a separate category. Hispanics/Latinos may be of any race.
Race / Ethnicity (NH = Non-Hispanic)	Pop 2000	Pop 2010	Pop 2020	% 2000	% 2010	% 2020
White alone (NH)	3,546	2,700	1,982	42.60%	35.04%	27.46%
Black or African American alone (NH)	3,950	3,701	3,128	47.46%	48.03%	43.33%
Native American or Alaska Native alone (NH)	48	32	32	0.58%	0.42%	0.44%
Asian alone (NH)	326	307	180	3.92%	3.98%	2.49%
Native Hawaiian or Pacific Islander alone (NH)	1	0	2	0.01%	0.00%	0.03%
Other race alone (NH)	5	10	19	0.06%	0.13%	0.26%
Mixed race or Multiracial (NH)	76	72	200	0.91%	0.93%	2.77%
Hispanic or Latino (any race)	371	884	1,676	4.46%	11.47%	23.22%
Total	8,323	7,706	7,219	100.00%	100.00%	100.00%

The 2019 American Community Survey estimated 6,602 people lived in the CDP, down from 7,706 at the 2010 United States census. In 2020, its population rebounded to 7,219. In 2019, the racial and ethnic makeup was 46.8% African American, 32.6% non-Hispanic white, 0.1% Native American, 3.1% Asian, 7.9% some other race, 1.7% two or more races, and 15.9% Hispanic and Latino American of any race. The median household income was $31,711 and 26.5% of the population lived at or below the poverty line. By the time of the 2020 census, its racial and ethnic makeup was 43.33% Black or African American, 27.46% non-Hispanic white, 0.44% Native American, 2.49% Asian, 0.03% Pacific Islander, 3.03% multiracial or of some other race, and 23.22% Hispanic and Latino American of any race; state and nationwide, this has reflected the demographic shift in American racial and ethnic identity as the U.S. began to experience non-Hispanic white demographic decline.

== Government and infrastructure ==
Bridge City is an unincorporated area of Jefferson Parish. Bridge City comes under the Jefferson Parish government. Bridge City is in the Third District Jefferson Parish Sheriff's Office. The Bridge City Fire Department is District 70. The Bridge City Center for Youth, a juvenile correctional facility for boys operated by the Louisiana Office of Juvenile Justice, is in Bridge City.

== Education ==
The area's public schools are operated by the Jefferson Parish Public School System.

Most areas of the CDP are zoned to: Gilbert PreK-8 School in Avondale, formerly Henry Ford Middle School until 2019. A small section is zoned to Isaac Joseph Elementary School in Westwego. For middle school, most areas are zoned to Gilbert PreK-8 while some are zoned to Worley Middle School. The high school which includes the CDP is L.W. Higgins High School in Marrero.

In regards to advanced studies academies, residents are zoned to the Marrero Academy.

Previously areas were zoned to Mildred S. Harris Elementary School (formerly Bridge City Elementary School) in Bridge City. The school was given its last name, after the founding principal of the school, in 2012. Members of the family of the founding principal and former student Nedra Cassard had campaigned to have the school renamed, and the district voted in favor of renaming. The school was founded in 1952. It closed in 2023. There was an unsuccessful community campaign to try to salvage the school.

Myrtle C. Thibodeaux Elementary School (formerly Westwego Elementary School) in Westwego and Catherine Strehle Elementary School in Avondale formerly served portions of Bridge City. In the early 2010s Henry Ford Middle School had Bridge City CDP in its boundary.
