= Louisiana Office of Juvenile Justice =

State agency overview
- Formed: 2004 (as Office of Youth Development); 2008 (as Office of Juvenile Justice)
- Preceding State agency: Louisiana Department of Public Safety and Corrections
- Type: Youth corrections
- Jurisdiction: Louisiana
- Status: Active
- Headquarters: Louisiana State Police Building, Baton Rouge, Louisiana
- State agency executive: E. Dustin Bickham, Head of Agency
- Parent department: Department of Public Safety and Corrections, Youth Services
- Parent State agency: Louisiana State Government

The Louisiana Office of Juvenile Justice (OJJ) is a cabinet-level Louisiana state agency that provides youth corrections services in the state.

The full official title of the agency is Department of Public Safety and Corrections, Youth Services, Office of Juvenile Justice (DPSC/YS/OJJ). The agency has its headquarters in the first floor of the Louisiana State Police Building in Baton Rouge.

The agency's current head is E. Dustin Bickham.

== History ==
The Louisiana Department of Public Safety and Corrections previously handled the care of juvenile prisoners. In 2003 the Louisiana Legislature voted to turn the department's juvenile division into a cabinet level agency.

In 2004 the juvenile system separated from the adult system. It was established as the Office of Youth Development (OYD), and it was given its current name by the Louisiana Legislature in 2008.

Beginning with the creation of the OJJ, the agency adopted a model used by the Missouri Division of Youth Services, the youth corrections agency of Missouri. The OJJ worked together with that agency and the Annie E. Casey Foundation.

== Institutions ==
OJJ secure facilities

The state operates three secure institutions for boys. Acadiana Center for Youth (ACY) in Bunkie, La The male institutions include:

- Bridge City Center for Youth (BCCY) - Bridge City, unincorporated Jefferson Parish
  - Riverside Alternative High School is located at BCCY.
- A. L. Swanson, Sr. Center for Youth (SCY) - Monroe
  - Southside Alternative High School is located at SCY.
  - There is a branch center, Swanson Center for Youth at Columbia, which opened in 2013 in the former Columbia Community Residential and Employment Services (CCRES) center for disabled persons.
- Acadiana Center for Youth (ACY) - Bunkie
  - Acadiana Center for youth opened in March 2019. Opening in phases, the facility is a state-of-the-art therapeutic facility that houses male offenders ages 13–21.

The OJJ uses the Ware Youth Center by contract to house adjudicated secure girls in an "intensive residential" program. It is located in unincorporated Red River Parish, about 3.5 kilometres (2.2 mi) from Coushatta.

=== Former institutions ===
Former male institutions:

- Louis Jetson Center for Youth (JCY) - unincorporated East Baton Rouge Parish, near Baton Rouge and Baker It as previously referred to as "Scotlandville" after the nearby community. The facility closed abruptly in January 2014. All residents were moved to the other secure facilities in the early morning hours.
- Tallulah Youth Center

Previously girls were housed in the Florida Parishes Detention Center in Covington, and the Terrebonne Detention Center in Houma.

=== Non-Secure Programs ===
OJJ's philosophy is to match adjudicated youth to programs to meet their needs. Some youth, while not amenable to treatment in the community, are not a risk to public safety or in dire need of treatment in a secure environment. OJJ contracts with community treatment providers in non-secure, residential settings (group homes and therapeutic foster care) to place adjudicated youth into. These group homes are located in various places throughout the state.

== Probation/Parole Services ==
OJJ is also tasked with the responsibility of providing probation and parole supervision for adjudicated youth throughout the state. There are 11 regional offices located in:

Northern Region:

- Shreveport
- Tallulah
- Monroe

Southeast Region:

- Thibodeaux
- New Orleans
- Hammond
- Baton Rouge

Central/Southwest Region:

- Alexandria
- Lake Charles
- Lafayette (which had a satellite office in Opelousas up until 2016, when it closed and consolidated with Lafayette)
- Natchitoches

Probation and Parole Officers are Peace Officers and Standards Training certified (P.O.S.T) and have arresting authority in the state.
