= J. Levy Dabadie Correctional Center =

Former prison in Louisiana, United States

Coordinates: 31°22′24″N 92°23′21″W

J. Levy Dabadie Correctional Center (JLDCC or DCC) was a men's prison adjacent to the Louisiana National Guard base on the grounds of Camp Beauregard and in Pineville, Louisiana. A facility of the Louisiana Department of Public Safety and Corrections, JLDCC is about 1 mile (1.6 km) east of the intersection of U.S. Route 165 and Louisiana Highway 116.

Dabadie opened in 1970. It was previously named Work Training Facility North. Dabadie is the transportation hub between the prisons in northern Louisiana and the prisons in southern Louisiana. On every Monday Dabadie processes hundreds of male prisoners who are being sent to and from the Wade Reception and Diagnostic Center and the Hunt Reception and Diagnostic Center. The center also processes prisoners being sent from local facilities to the two reception centers.

It closed in July 2012. The state planned to move the 330 prisoners at Dabadie to the Avoyelles Correctional Center. Over 100 people lost their jobs.
