= Dixon Correctional Institute =

Louisiana state prison facility near Baton Rouge

Coordinates: 30°48′47″N 91°12′28″W

- Interactive map of Dixon Correctional Institute
- Location: 5568 Louisiana 68 Jackson, Louisiana
- Status: open
- Security class: mixed
- Capacity: 2529
- Opened: 1976
- Managed by: Louisiana Department of Public Safety & Corrections

Dixon Correctional Institute (DCI) is a prison facility in Jackson, Louisiana. DCI, a facility of the Louisiana Department of Public Safety and Corrections, is approximately 30 miles (48 km) from Baton Rouge. Dixon is located about 34 miles (55 km) from the Louisiana State Penitentiary (Angola).

The housing of the warden of Dixon is in a pastoral setting by a lake.

== History ==
Dixon, which opened in 1976, was the first medium security prison in Louisiana. 7.5% of Dixon's beds are classified as "maximum security."

Burl Cain served as the warden of DCI until he was named in the same position at Angola. By 1997 Cain continued to live at DCI even though he was by that time the warden of Angola. Therefore LeBlanc lived in his own house, 7 miles (11 km) away, and received $4,810 annually by the state as compensation. LeBlanc later became the Secretary of Corrections of Louisiana.

Its current warden is Edward D. Bickham. Another former Dixon warden is Richard Stalder of Zachary, who was the secretary of the Louisiana Department of Public Safety and Corrections from 1992 to 2008.

Around 2003 the prison held boxing matches for prisoners.

== Notable inmates ==
- Torrence Hatch (Lil Boosie)
- Vince Marinello

== Official website ==
- Official website
