= Raymond Laborde Correctional Center =

Prison in Louisiana, United States

Coordinates: 30°58′27″N 92°01′30″W

- Interactive map of Raymond Laborde Correctional Center
- Location: 1630 Prison Road Cottonport, Louisiana address
- Security class: minimum, medium, maximum
- Capacity: 1564
- Opened: 1989

Raymond Laborde Correctional Center (RLCC), formerly Avoyelles Correctional Center (ACC), is a state prison of Louisiana, operated by the Louisiana Department of Public Safety & Corrections. It is located in unincorporated Avoyelles Parish, Louisiana, near Cottonport and about 30 miles (48 km) south of Alexandria.

== History ==
In 1989 Frank Polozola, the U.S. district judge in the state, approved a plan for the state to send over 600 state prisoners who were incarcerated in parish jails to state prisons. Avoyelles and Angola were the two state prisons planned to receive most of these prisoners.

In 2011 there was a plan to sell Avoyelles to a private company. The bill failed while in a committee of the Louisiana House of Representatives. In 2012 House Bill 850, which called for the state to look for proposals in privatizing the prison, was launched. The budget under Governor Bobby Jindal called for closing J. Levy Dabadie Correctional Center, having its prisoners go to Avoyelles, and then sell Avoyelles.

The ecumenical chapel at the Avoyelles Correctional Center is a gift of the late Roy O. Martin, Jr., a timber businessman from Alexandria, and his second wife, the former Vinita Johnson (1918-2007), who were advocates of faith-based initiatives in penal institutions.
