= Forcht-Wade Correctional Center =

Former prison in Louisiana, United States

Coordinates: 32°15′44″N 93°56′07″W

Forcht-Wade Correctional Center was a state prison facility in unincorporated Caddo Parish, Louisiana. The prison, operated by the Louisiana Department of Public Safety & Corrections, was located in the Eddie D. Jones Nature Park in Keithville. The prison also controlled the Dr. Martin Forcht Jr. Clinical Treatment Unit, a facility located near Spring Ridge.

== History ==
The Caddo Parish commission donated the site of Forcht-Wade to the State of Louisiana in 1977. The donation included some structures that existed on the site. The contract involved in the handover states that if the state does not use the facility within a two-year period, the Parish will receive the land back.

Forcht-Wade was originally a full prison, and it served as a division of the David Wade Correctional Center.

By 1999 Caddo Parish donated the former Caddo Parish Detention Center to Louisiana. The State of Louisiana implemented a $6 million renovation program so the facility could become a facility for the chronically ill and geriatric and house around 600 prisoners.

By 2002 the Legislature of Louisiana added a boot camp program to the prison.

In 2009 the State of Louisiana announced that it was converting Forcht-Wade into a substance abuse treatment center for men. Therefore, Elayn Hunt Correctional Center would begin to process incoming male prisoners from all areas of the state. Hunt also expanded its nursing unit to accommodate prisoners from Forcht-Wade's nursing unit. In 2010 Forcht-Wade became a substance abuse treatment center, with a capacity of 500 prisoners. During that year, a new chapel was built at Forcht-Wade.

=== Closure ===
In February 2012 the state announced that the prison will close on July 1, 2012, due to state budget cuts. The state argued that operating Forcht-Wade as a standalone treatment center was not cost-effective. 139 employees would be out of work. The state said that the closure would save a little over $4 million in the 2013 fiscal year and $8.6 million in the 2014 fiscal year. Originally the state planned to move the treatment center to David Wade.

The prison closed. Ultimately the Steve Hoyle Rehabilitation Center was moved to the Bossier Parish Correctional Center. The prisoners in the rehabilitation center and the other state prisoners, about 250, were sent to the medium and maximum security facilities at the Bossier Parish facility. Other Forcht-Wade prisoners were sent to work release programs or to David Wade. The State of Louisiana designated Forcht-Wade as a place to house prisoners in case of a hurricane evacuation that affects other facilities.

On October 1, 2012, the commissioner of Caddo Parish, Ken Epperson, proposed replacing the prison with a zoo, or with another type of economic use. Epperson planned to introduce a resolution in the parish government that would ask the state to turn over the closed property ahead of the two-year limit stated in the contract, so the parish could use the land sooner. The facility has since been demolished.

== Function ==
The main prison was located in the property of the Eddie D. Jones Nature Park in Keithville, an unincorporated area in Caddo Parish. The facility had 100 acres (40 ha) of land. The prison also controlled the Dr. Martin Forcht Jr. Clinical Treatment Unit, a facility located in the former Caddo Detention Center, situated near Spring Ridge. The unit housed geriatric and chronically ill prisoners.

The prison served as a reception center for new prisoners. Male inmates in northern parishes entered the DOC system through the Wade Reception and Diagnostic Center (WRDC) at the Forcht Clinical Treatment Unit.

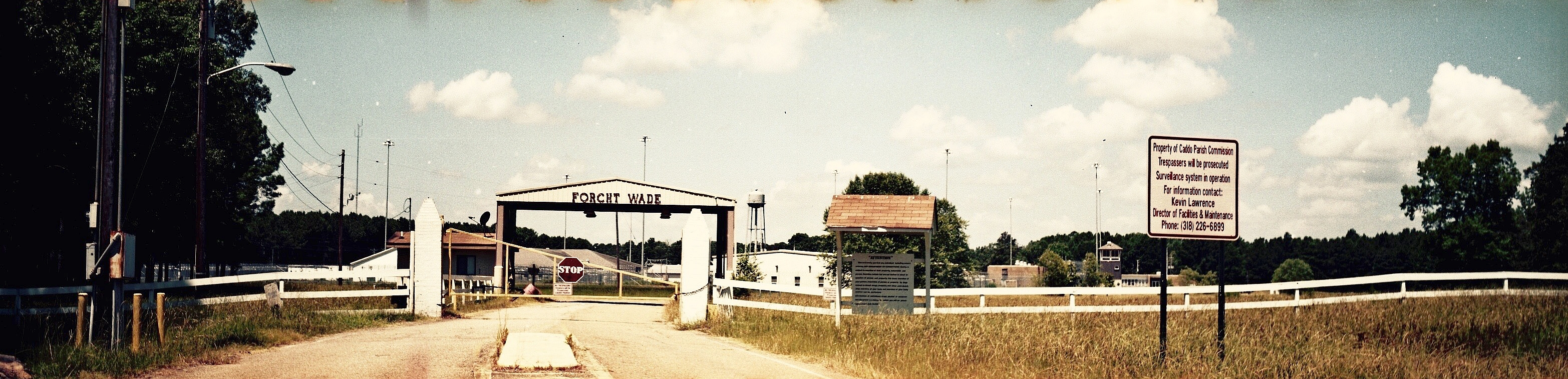
Forcht-Wade Correctional Center, 2015
