= Elayn Hunt Correctional Center =

Prison in Louisiana, United States

Elayn Hunt Correctional Center Institution
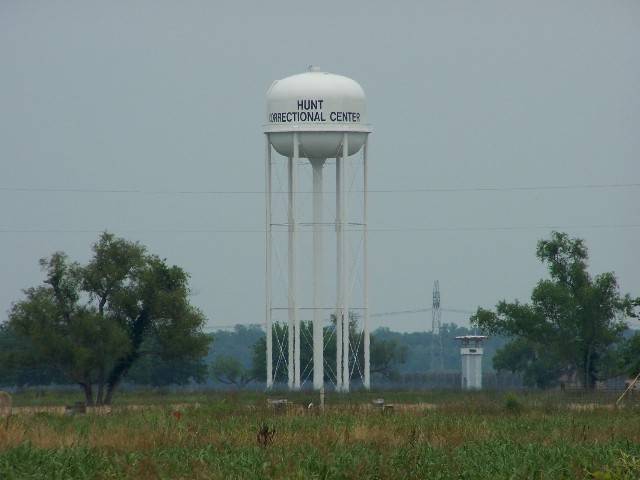
- Elayn Hunt Correctional Center

- Location in Louisiana
- Location: St. Gabriel, Louisiana; 30°15′55″N 91°05′12″W
- Status: Operational
- Capacity: 1,875
- Opened: 1979
- Managed by: Louisiana Department of Public Safety and Corrections
- Warden: Travis Day
- Website: doc.louisiana.gov/contact/correctional-facilities/elayn-hunt-correctional-center

Elayn Hunt Correctional Center (EHCC) located in St. Gabriel, Louisiana, is a multi-security- level Louisiana Department of Public Safety and Corrections institution for adult men. It is the second-largest prison in Louisiana and is located about 70 miles northwest of New Orleans. Elayn Hunt has about half the number of prisoners held at the larger Louisiana State Penitentiary, known as Angola.

Since 2010, male inmates from all parishes enter the DOC system through the Hunt Reception and Diagnostic Center (HRDC) at Hunt.

== History ==
EHCC was opened in 1979.

In January 2002, a prison cemetery opened at Hunt. Some state prisoners unclaimed by families are buried here. Before that month all unclaimed state prisoners were buried at Point Lookout Cemetery in the Louisiana State Penitentiary.

Prior to 2010, Hunt served as the reception center only for male prisoners from southern parishes, while Forcht-Wade Correctional Center operated the reception center for male prisoners from northern parishes. In 2009 the state announced that Forcht-Wade would be redesignated as a substance abuse center. Hunt was designated to handle reception of males for all areas of the state. Hunt also expanded its nursing unit to accommodate prisoners from Forcht-Wade's nursing unit.

== Notable prisoners ==
- Mystikal
- McKinley "Mac" Phipps
- Herman Wallace, one of the Angola Three, he was transferred to this prison in March 2009 after his first appeal hearing of a 1972 conviction, after decades in solitary confinement at Angola. He was released in 2013 and died three days later, before the state could try him again.
- Abdulrahman Zeitoun
- C-Murder
- Patrick O'Neal Kennedy
