= Louisiana Department of Public Safety & Corrections =

State law enforcement agency of Louisiana

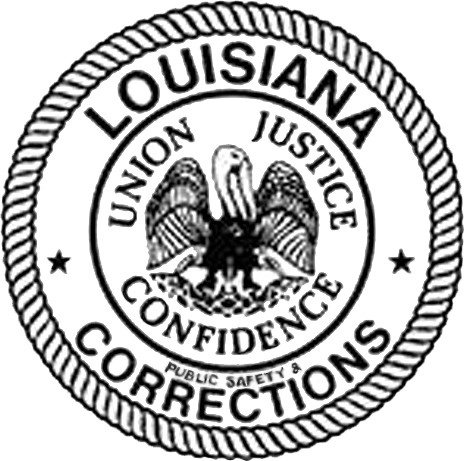
- Common name: Louisiana Department of Corrections
- Abbreviation: DPS&C

Agency overview
- Employees: 6,200
- Annual budget: US $1 billion

Jurisdictional structure
- Operations jurisdiction: Louisiana, US
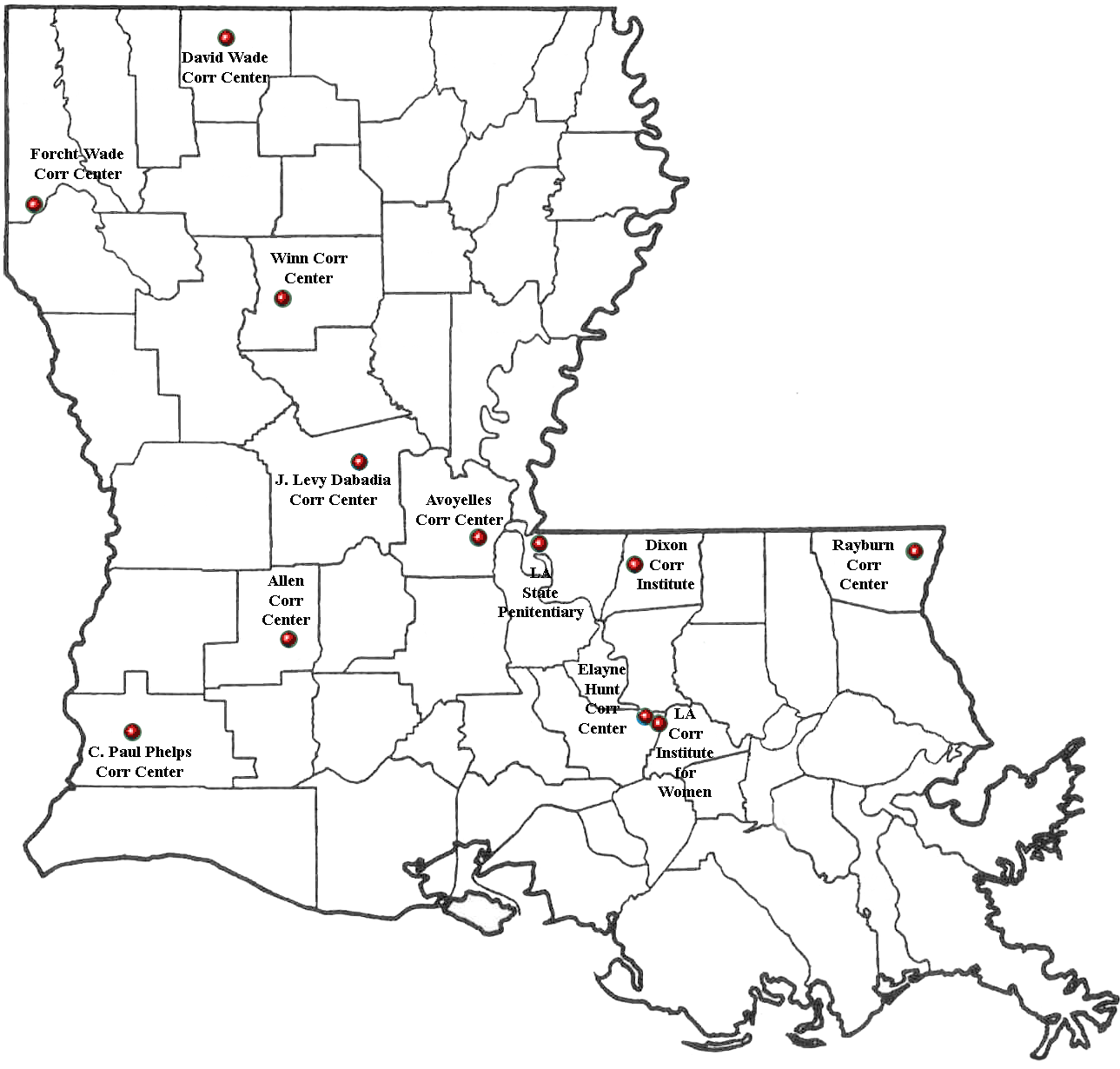
- 2010 Map
- Area: 51,885
- Population: 4,293,204 (2007 est.)

Operational structure
- Headquarters: Baton Rouge, Louisiana
- Agency executive: Gary Westcott, Secretary

Facilities
- Correctional Facilities: Eight

Website
- [doc.louisiana.gov/ Louisiana Department of Public Safety & Corrections website]

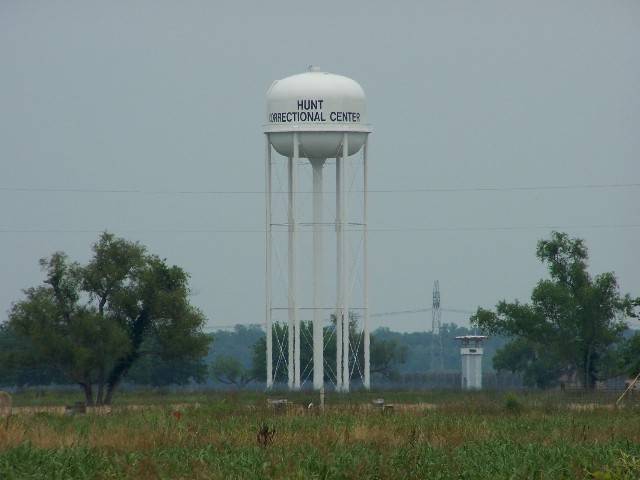
Elayn Hunt Correctional Center

The Department of Public Safety and Corrections (DPS&C) (French: Département de la sécurité publique et des services correctionnels de Louisiane) is a state law enforcement agency responsible for the incarceration of inmates and management of correctional facilities within the state of Louisiana. The agency is headquartered in Baton Rouge. The agency comprises two major areas: Public Safety Services and Corrections Services. The secretary, who is appointed by the governor of Louisiana, serves as the department's chief executive officer. The Corrections Services deputy secretary, undersecretary, and assistant secretaries for the Office of Adult Services and the Office of Youth Development report directly to the secretary. Headquarters administration consists of centralized divisions that support the management and operations of the adult and juvenile institutions, adult and juvenile probation and parole district offices, and all other services provided by the department.

Louisiana is a significant outlier in terms of incarceration rate within the United States, which already has among the highest incarceration rates of any country in the world. With an incarceration rate (including jail inmates awaiting trial) over 1,000 per 100,000 residents, Louisiana has a higher rate of incarceration than any country except El Salvador.

== Agency overview ==
The three major divisions (Corrections Services, Office of Juvenile Justice, and Public Safety Services) operate and report to the governor of Louisiana separately even though they are the same department according to the Louisiana Constitution.

=== Office of the Secretary ===
In 2024, Governor Jeff Landry appointed Gary Westcott to serve as the secretary. Westcott replaced James M. "Jimmy" LeBlanc who retired after serving more than 50 years in corrections and 16 years as the secretary.

The secretary is responsible for the functioning and control of all programs within the department. He formulates rules and regulations and determines policy regarding management, personnel, and total operations. He leads and supports staff, who are charged with carrying out the work of the agency.

As part of the secretary's office, the deputy secretary is responsible for special duties and functions as assigned by the secretary. Primary among them are oversight of the Children's Initiative, coordination and management of the department's Critical Incident Stress Management response, and support and facilitation of the Risk Review Panel process.

Other executive staff carry out long and short-term projects. The Legal Services Division represents and defends the department in litigation, including civil service matters. The Crime Victims Services Bureau coordinates the department's response to crime victims, including the process of registration and notification and support of a restorative justice initiative. The deputy secretary of the Department of Public Safety serves as Superintendent of the Louisiana State Police.

Gordon Russell and Maya Lau of The Baton Rouge Advocate wrote that the salary of Burl Cain, warden of Louisiana State Penitentiary from 1995 to 2016, was $167,211 per year, $30,000 higher than that of LeBlanc, a previous subordinate and personal friend of Cain; Russell and Lau stated that many observers considered Cain the de facto head of the department.

=== Office of Management and Finance ===
Under the authority of the undersecretary, the Office of Management and Finance provides management support to all units in activities involving fiscal matters and grant management, information services, food services, maintenance and construction, performance audit, training, procurement and contractual review, human resources, and the Prison Enterprises Division. The undersecretary serves as chief of staff for headquarters operations.

=== Office of Adult Services ===
Under the direction of an assistant secretary, the Office of Adult Services (OAS) provides administrative oversight of and support for the operational programs of the adult institutions and provides technical assistance to local jail facilities. The assistant secretary leads and directs the department's operational audit teams, which conduct audits of all adult and juvenile institutions, non-secure contract facilities, and community work release centers and assist all units with matters relative to the maintenance of American Correctional Association (ACA) accreditation. OAS staff support the Administrative Remedy Procedure and disciplinary appeal processes, screen and recommend inmates for participation in work release, and maintain central office ACA accreditation. There are eleven adult institutions under the broad authority of the assistant secretary, including two operated under contractual agreements with private management corporations.

=== Office of Youth Development ===
Under the direction of an assistant secretary, the Office of Youth Development (OYD) has policy oversight and support responsibilities for state programs for youth who are adjudicated delinquent and many youth and their families ruled in need of services by courts of juvenile jurisdiction. OYD staff also support the Administrative Remedy Procedure and disciplinary appeal processes for juveniles and perform quality assurance activities for the juvenile institutions.

Additionally, the Division of Youth Services (DYS) provides probation and parole supervision and coordinates both residential and non-residential treatment services for delinquent youth and for status offenders and their families. DYS has offices located in Alexandria, Baton Rouge, Harvey, Hammond, Lafayette, Lake Charles, Monroe, Natchitoches, New Orleans, Opelousas, Shreveport, Tallulah, and Thibodaux. As of May 30, 2003, there were 6476 youth under supervision – 5630 as adjudicated delinquents and 846 as FINS (Families in Need of Services).

=== Division of Probation and Parole-Adult ===
The Division of Probation and Parole-Adult, comprising twenty-two district offices throughout the state and a Headquarters Office in Baton Rouge, functions as a community services division. Officers of the division supervise adult felony offenders who are released to the community on probation, parole, diminution of sentence, or medical furlough. They have a broad range of duties from drug screening offenders, to executing parole warrants. Officers are commissioned, P.O.S.T. certified, law enforcement officers with arrest powers. They supervise offenders living in the community serving felony sentences outside of incarceration. They also supervise inmates in ten community rehabilitation centers (CRCs) and the intensive parole cases from institutional IMPACT (Intensive Motivational Program of Alternative Correctional Treatment). Officers in the division provide investigative services to decision-makers in the criminal justice system, including judges, the Parole and Pardon Boards, and the Governor's Office. They oversee collection of various criminal justice fees, supervision fees, and victim restitution. District offices are located in Alexandria, Amite, Baton Rouge, Chalmette, Clinton, Covington, Donaldsonville, Harvey, Lafayette, Lake Charles, Leesville, Minden, Monroe, Natchitoches, New Iberia, New Orleans, Port Allen, Shreveport, Tallulah, Thibodaux, and Ville Platte. During FY 2002–03, officers supervised collection of more than $20,752,527. As of July 1, 2003, officers of the division were supervising 63,000 offenders.

=== Prison Enterprises Division ===
The Prison Enterprises Division (PE) helps to reduce the overall cost of prison operations and the operating costs of other state agencies, local government entities, and other tax-supported institutions primarily by operating self-supported industrial and agricultural businesses that employ inmates in meaningful jobs, teach them marketable skills and good work habits, and provide quality, cost-effective products and services. PE pays incentive wages for all inmates who are eligible. Farming operations include row crops and garden vegetables, range herds, a swinery, food processing, a feed mill, land leveling, hay production, and forestry. Industrial operations include the manufacture of license plates, mattresses, mops, brooms, chemicals, garments, and office chairs; a print shop; silkscreen operations; a plastic sign shop; metal fabrication; embroidery and furniture refurbishing; and janitorial services for other agencies.

Louisiana DPS&C Safety Enforcement patch

=== Board of Pardons ===
The five members of the Board of Pardons are appointed by the governor. The board meets on regularly scheduled, publicly announced dates to consider applications for pardon, sentence commutation, and restoration of rights and privileges of citizenship. All of the board's recommendations for clemency are forwarded to the governor for final action.

=== Board of Parole ===
The seven members of the Board of Parole are appointed by the governor. Board members function in three-person panels to grant or deny parole to inmates who are eligible for parole, set behavioral conditions for inmates released to parole by action of the board or by diminution of sentence, and hold hearings for inmates facing revocation for violating conditions of their release from incarceration.

== Public Safety Services ==
The head of the Louisiana Department of Public Safety Services (LADPS) is the Secretary of Public Safety and Corrections.There are several divisions, including the Office of Management and Finance, the Louisiana Highway Safety Commission, the Louisiana Oil Spill Coordinator's Office (LOSCO), and the Louisiana State Police.

LOSCO was created in 1991 after the Oil Pollution Act of 1990. It coordinates oil spill responses, develops oil spill contingency plans, trains for oil spill drills, is the lead for the state in natural resource damage assessments for oil spills in Louisiana, maintains the Louisiana Oil Spill Management System, a public database with up to date information on oil spill response and restoration funds, administers the Louisiana Regional Restoration Planning Program, helps select restoration projects to be implemented to compensate the public for the natural resources and services injured by a given oil spill; and it sponsors and/or attends professional training courses.

=== Louisiana State Police ===
The Superintendent of the Louisiana State Police also serves as ex officio Deputy Secretary of Public Safety Services, with more than 2600 personnel. Beginning January 8, 2024, Robert P. Hodges will replace outgoing Colonel Lamar Davis as the 27th Louisiana State Police superintendent and deputy secretary of Public Safety Services.

The Public Safety Services also includes the Office of Motor Vehicles, the Department of Public Safety enforcement officers, the Office of State Fire Marshal, the Liquefied Petroleum Gas Commission which includes anhydrous ammonia, Office of legal affairs, and the Louisiana Gaming Control Board.

==== Louisiana State Police Patrol Division ====
The Transportation Safety Services (TSS), within the Louisiana State Police Patrol Division, includes the Commercial Vehicle Enforcement Division, which includes the Motor Carrier Safety Unit, Towing and Recovery Unit (1989- Louisiana Towing and Storage Act), Motor Vehicle Inspection Unit, and the Commercial Vehicle Enforcement Division.

== Corrections Services ==
Corrections Services (referred to as the Department of Corrections) is responsible for the custody of adult inmates across Louisiana. As of 2026, about 15,000 of Louisiana's 30,000 inmates are assigned to the state's eight correctional facilities. The remaining incarcerated individuals are assigned to parish facilities. The state's facilities do not have the capacity to house all inmates sentenced under state law, so the state reimburses local governments housing inmates with state sentences. Since its inception, the Louisiana Department of Public Safety & Corrections has lost 12 officers in line-of-duty deaths, the latter two due to COVID-19.

=== History ===
In 1835, the first Louisiana State Penitentiary was built at the corner of 6th and Laurel Streets in Baton Rouge. In 1844, the penitentiary, including the prisoners, was leased to the private firm of McHatton Pratt and Company. Union Troops occupied the penitentiary during the Civil War, and in 1869, the lease was awarded to a former Confederate Major by the name of Samuel James. Major James oversaw the Louisiana Corrections system until his death in 1894, after which his son took over the lease.

From 1901 until 1916, Corrections was operated by the Board of Control, a three-member panel appointed by the governor of Louisiana. One of the first actions taken by the new board was the purchase of the 8,000-acre (32 km^{2}) Angola Plantation. New camps were built and many new security officers were hired.

In 1916, the legislature abolished the Board of Control and appointed a general manager of the penitentiary. The new general manager, Henry L. Fuqua, fired almost all of the officers at Angola and in their place put selected inmate "trusty guards". The manager also purchased an additional 10,000 acres (40 km^{2}) of land, increasing the size of the State Penitentiary to 18,000 acres (73 km^{2}).

In 2010, the agency announced that it may sell some prisons in order to generate funds.

=== Operations ===
Male inmates from all parishes enter the DOC system through the Hunt Reception and Diagnostic Center (HRDC) at Elayn Hunt Correctional Center. Prior to the 2010 redesignation of Forcht-Wade Correctional Center as a substance abuse facility, male inmates from northern parishes entered the DOC system through the Wade Reception and Diagnostic Center (WRDC) at Martin L. Forcht Jr., Clinical Treatment Unit, which was a satellite of David Wade Correctional Center. Male inmates from southern parishes entered the DOC system through the HRDC. Male death row inmates are transferred directly from their parish of sentencing to the Louisiana State Penitentiary (Angola). Male inmates who have over 30 years to their earliest possible release dates and male inmates sentenced to life in prison typically are assigned to the Louisiana State Penitentiary. Some young inmates with life sentences go to Wade Correctional Center.

Prior to July 2012, Male inmates within seven years of their release who have positive behavior and work records and who are not inherently prohibited by the crimes they committed were eligible to be transferred to the minimum security J. Levy Dabadie Correctional Center, which is located on the grounds of Camp Beauregard.

Louisiana Correctional Institute for Women (LCIW) is the only state prison in Louisiana housing female offenders, and the facility houses females of all security levels, including female death row inmates. Women enter the DOC system through the Female Reception and Diagnostic Center (FRDC).

The state execution chamber is at Louisiana State Penitentiary.

Inmates in need of medical attention who require more than standard health care are taken to the Louisiana State University Health Sciences Center Health Care Services Division. Inpatient mental health care for men is provided at Louisiana State Penitentiary and Elayn Hunt Correctional Center. Inpatient mental health care for women is provided at LCIW.

Prior to July 2012, sex offenders may be housed in any Louisiana state prison except for J. Levy Dabadie. J. Levy Dabadie served as the transportation hub between the prisons of north Louisiana and the prisons of south Louisiana; out of Dabadie, prisoners were transferred to and from the Hunt and Wade reception centers.

As of 2007 some prisoners may elect to go to the Louisiana State Police Troop A in Baton Rouge; it houses a minimum security correctional facility not operated by the DOC.

Due to 2006 state legislation sponsored by Senator Rob Marionneaux prohibiting tobacco smoking in public places, prisons began to curtail the tobacco smoking on their property. Beginning on May 15, 2009, Avoyelles Correctional Center and Dixon Correctional Institute started a pilot program where tobacco smoking was limited to certain areas at certain times in their facilities. On August 15, 2009, tobacco smoking at Louisiana state prisons became limited.

Legislation limits payments to those wrongfully convicted to $15,000 just for each year served in prison with a maximum of $250,000. Further the amount is paid in ten annual payments. Those who have served very long unjust terms may die before being paid.

=== Facilities ===
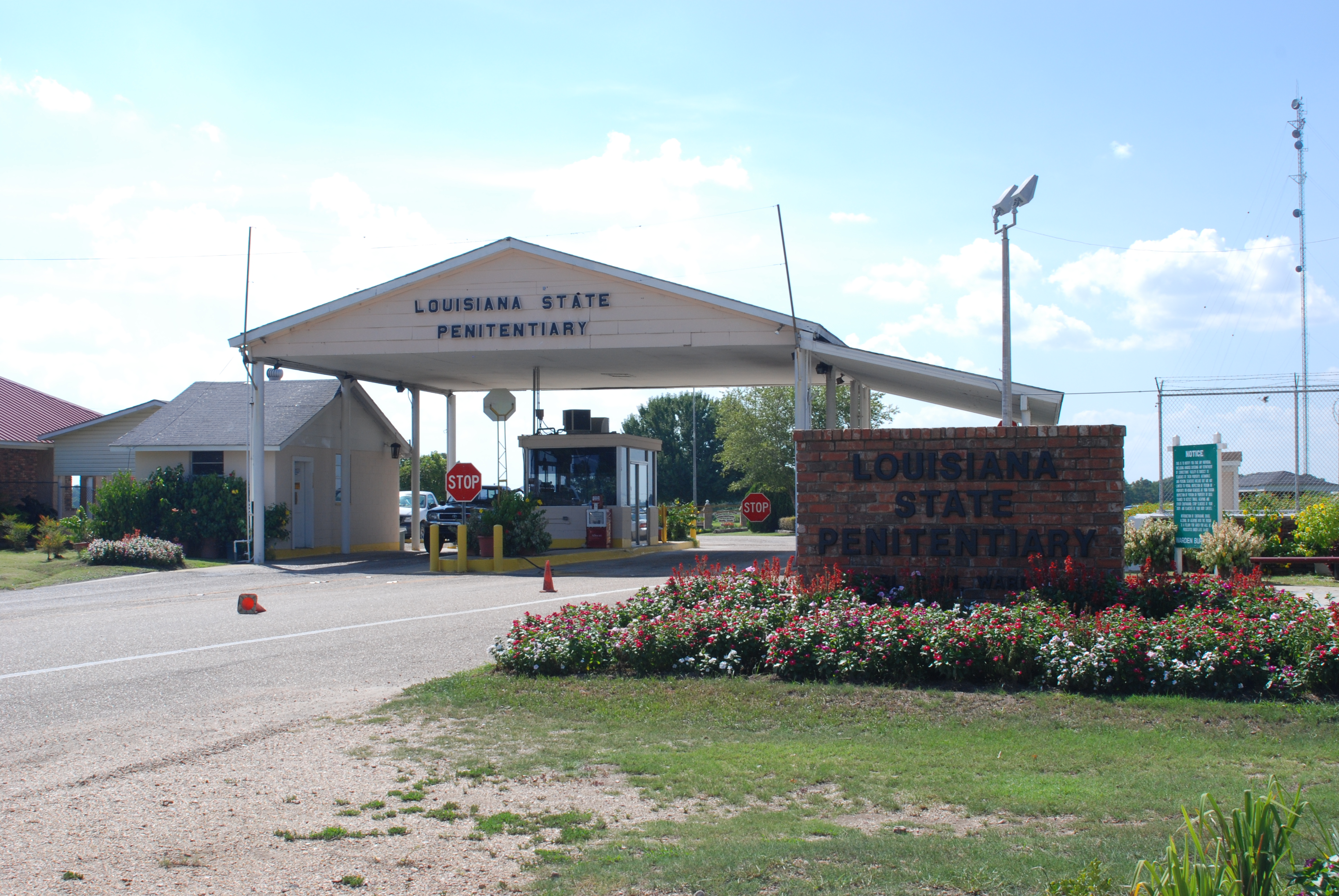
Louisiana State Penitentiary

- List of Louisiana state prisons

The Louisiana Department of Public Safety and Corrections previously handled the care of juvenile prisoners. The juvenile centers that were operated by the department included:

- Bridge City Center for Youth (BCCY) - Bridge City, unincorporated Jefferson Parish
- Louis Jetson Center for Youth (JCCY) - unincorporated East Baton Rouge Parish, near Baton Rouge and Baker
- A. L. "Red" Swanson Sr. Center for Youth (SCCY, later SCCY-MON) - Monroe
- Swanson Madison Parish Unit (SCCY-M, later SCCY-MAD) - Tallulah

In 2004 the juvenile system separated from the adult system. The Louisiana Office of Juvenile Justice now operates juvenile institutions.

The state of Louisiana has a guarantee that private prisons under the state authority will each have at least a 96% occupancy, and in the event such an occupancy is not met, the private prisons are paid as if they were at 96% occupancy.

As of 2025 Louisiana has 10 adult prisons.

=== Population ===
As of September 30, 2009, 39,726 adults were under the custody of the DOC. Of them, 19,013 adult inmates (51%) were in state prisons, 19,634 (49%) were in local jails, and 1,079 adults (less than 1%, rounding to zero) were in contract work release. Of the people in DOC custody, 93.4% were male and 6.6% were female. Of the population, 69.8% were Black, 29.9% were White, and .3% were other.

As of September 30, 2009, 4,310 offenders were incarcerated with life sentences in state prisons, representing 10.8% of the prison population. Of the people with life sentences, 73.2% were Black, 26.6% were White, and .2% were other. 97.1% were male and 2.9% were female.

As of September 30, 2009, 84 people, including 82 males and 2 females, were on death row for committing violent crimes. The death row population constituted .2% of Louisiana's incarcerated offenders. Of the death row offenders, 64.6% were Black, 34.1% were White, and 1.3% were other. The average age of a death row offender was 38.5 years, and the average age of conviction was 27.6 years.

== See also ==
- List of law enforcement agencies in Louisiana
- List of United States state correction agencies
