= Eric Matthews =

Eric Matthews may refer to:

- Eric Matthews (wrestler) (born 1933), New Zealand wrestler
- Eric Matthews (musician) (born 1969), American composer, musician, recording artist and record producer
- Eric Matthews (serial killer), American serial killer
- Eric Matthews (politician), member of the Montana House of Representatives

== Characters ==
- Eric Matthews (Boy Meets World) (born 1978), brother of titular "boy"
- Eric Matthews (Saw), police officer portrayed by American actor Donnie Wahlberg

== See also ==
- Erik Mathews Flowers (born 1978), American football defensive end
- Matthews (surname)
