= Louisiana State Penitentiary =

American maximum-security prison farm

- Unincorporated community
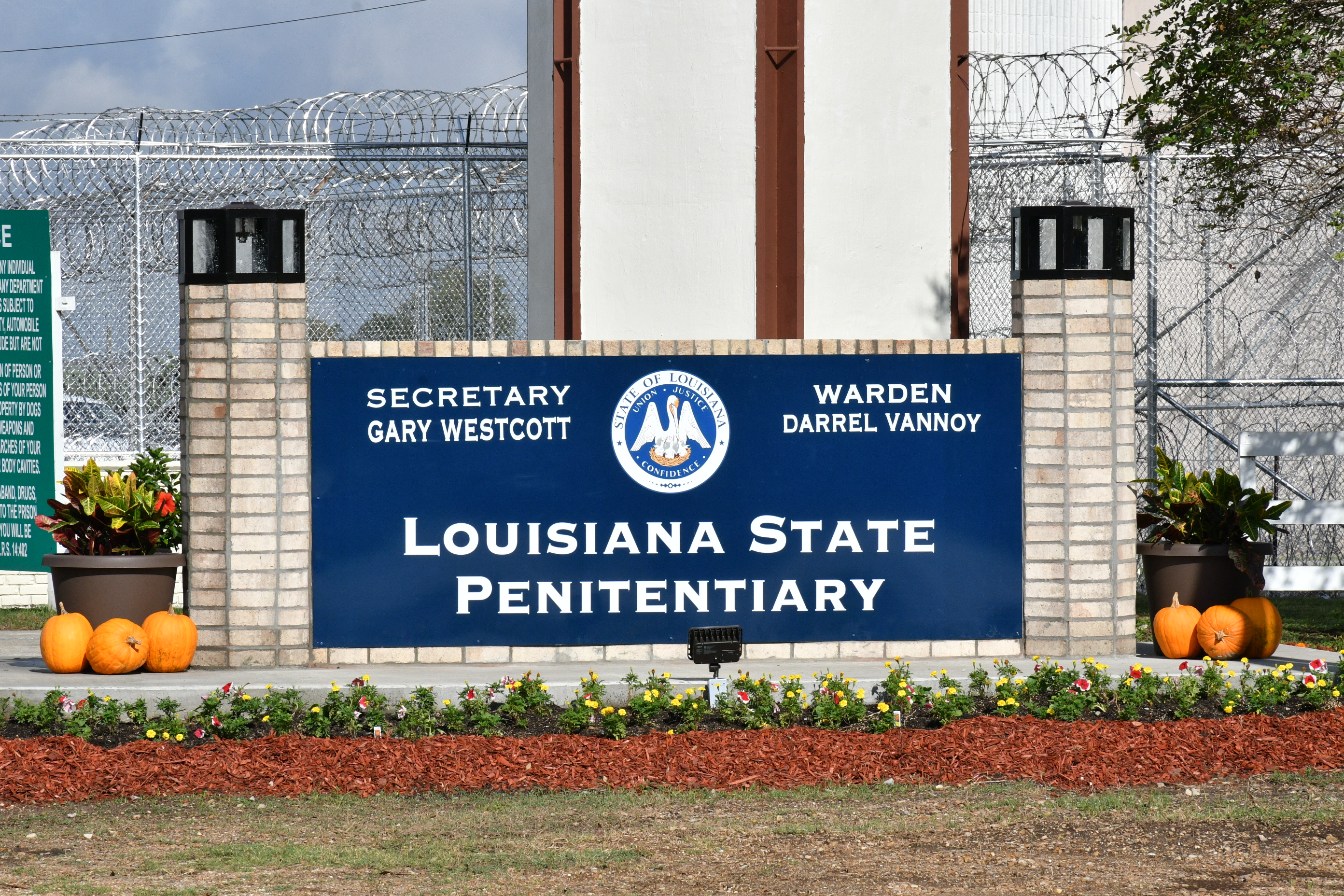
- The entrance sign to Louisiana State Penitentiary
- Nicknames: "Angola", "Alcatraz of the South", and "The Farm"
- Location in Louisiana Louisiana State Penitentiary (the United States)
- Coordinates: 30°57′22″N 91°35′41″W
- Country: United States
- State: Louisiana
- Parish: West Feliciana
- Elevation Angola Landing is 43 ft: 49 ft (15 m)
- Time zone: UTC-6 (Central (CST))
  - Summer (DST): UTC-5 (CDT)
- ZIP Code: 70712
- Area code: 225
- GNIS feature ID: 553304; Angola Landing: 542930
- Website: doc.louisiana.gov/location/louisiana-state-penitentiary
- The above GNIS IDs are related to the "populated places". The GNIS ID for the Louisiana State Penitentiary "locale" is 536752, the GNIS ID for the museum is 2603238, the GNIS ID for the fire department building is 2673017, and the GNIS ID for the adult school facility is 2434828. The GNIS for the previous Louisiana State Penitenitary building in Baton Rouge is 552789.

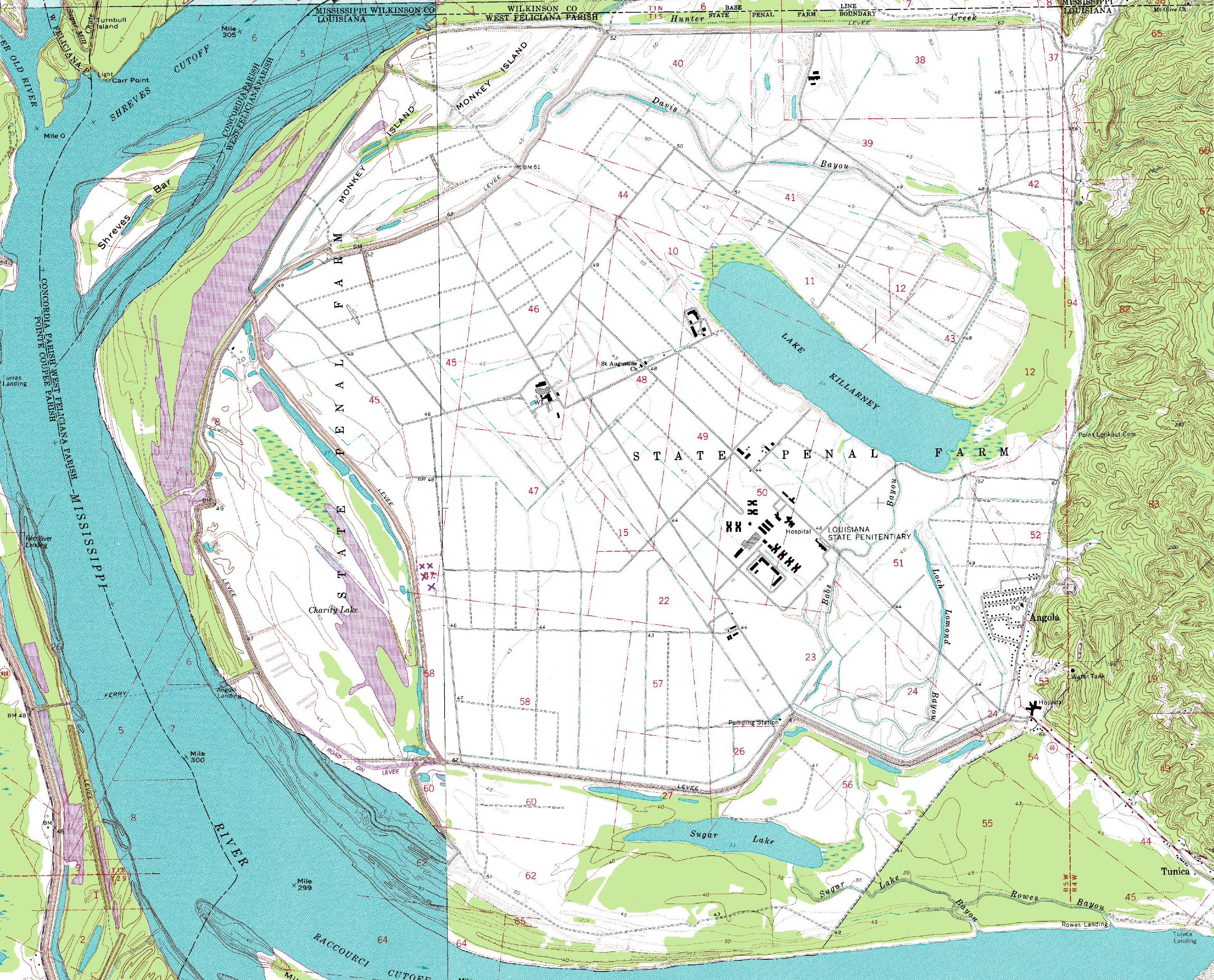
The USGS topographic map of Louisiana State Penitentiary in 1994

The Louisiana State Penitentiary is a maximum-security correctional facility in Louisiana operated by the Louisiana Department of Public Safety and Corrections. It is the largest maximum-security correctional facility in the United States, with 5,000 prisoners and 1,800 staff, including corrections officers, janitors, maintenance workers, social workers, nurses, educators, deputy wardens, and the warden himself. The current warden is Darrel Vannoy, who was appointed to the role in 2024, after having previously served as warden between 2016 and 2021, following long-time warden Burl Cain's resignation.

Located in West Feliciana Parish, the correctional facility is set between oxbow lakes on the east side of a bend of the Mississippi River and thus flanked on three sides by water. It lies less than two miles (three kilometers) south of Louisiana's straight east–west border with Mississippi.

The correctional facility is located at the end of Louisiana Highway 66, around 22 miles (35 km) northwest of St. Francisville. Death row for men and the state execution chamber for men and women are located on the grounds of LSP.

== History ==
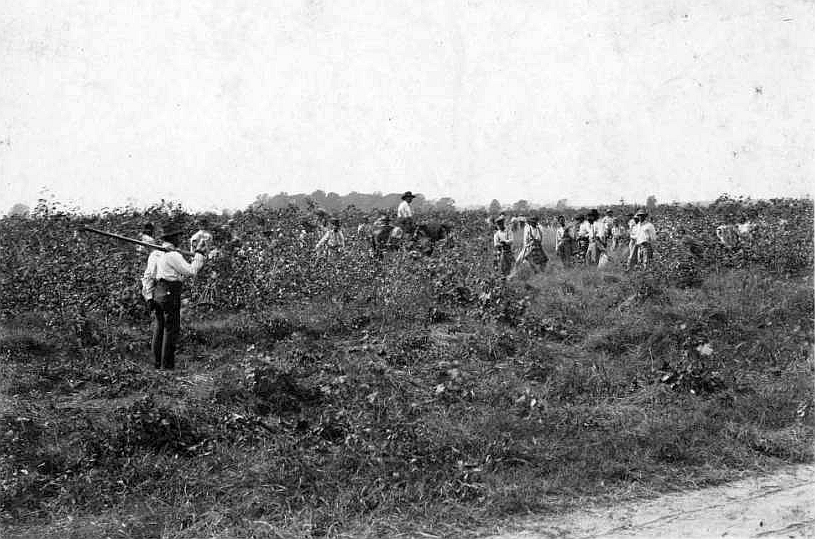
Picking cotton at Angola, c. 1900

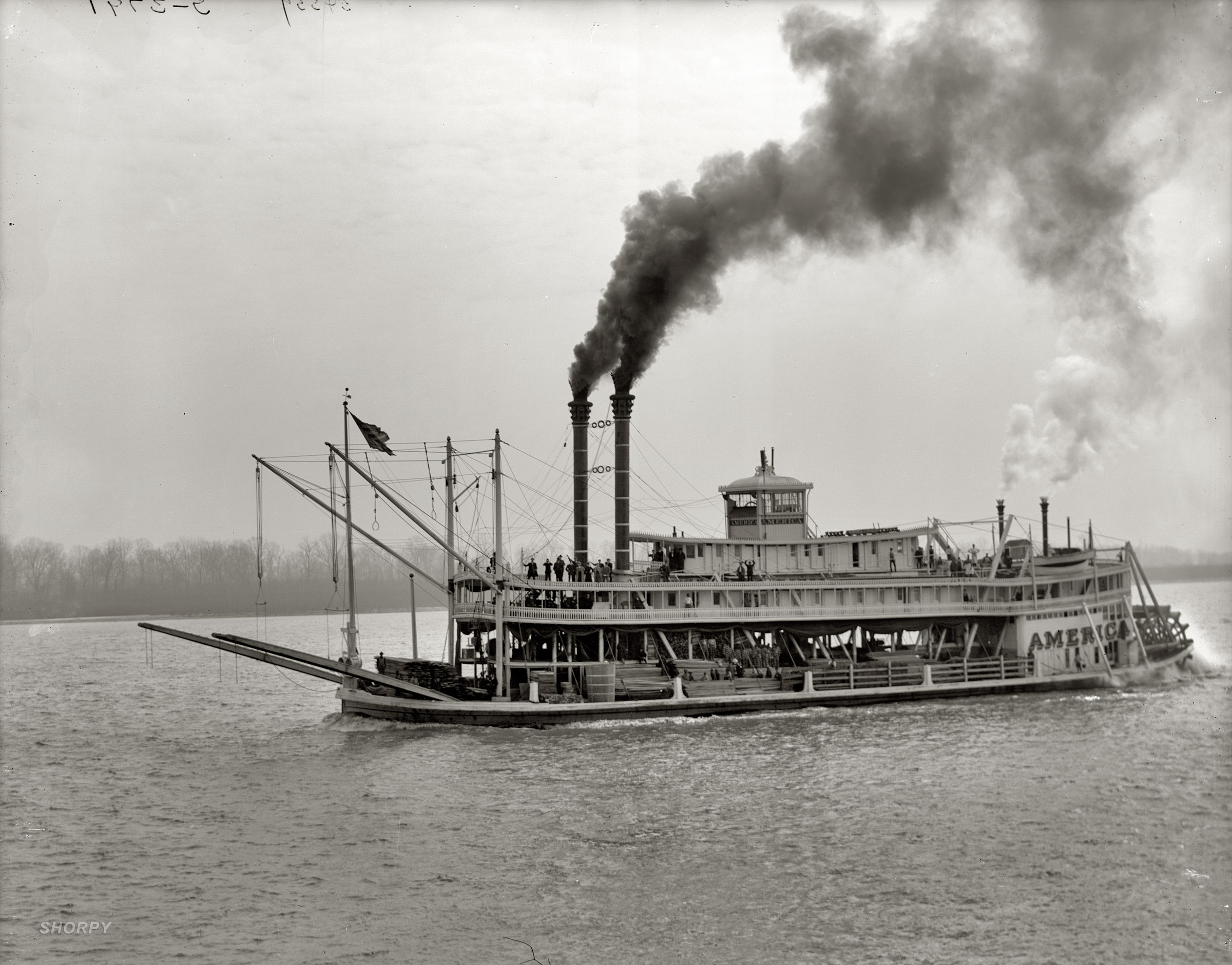
Riverboat America with convicts and supplies on the Mississippi River, circa late 1800s

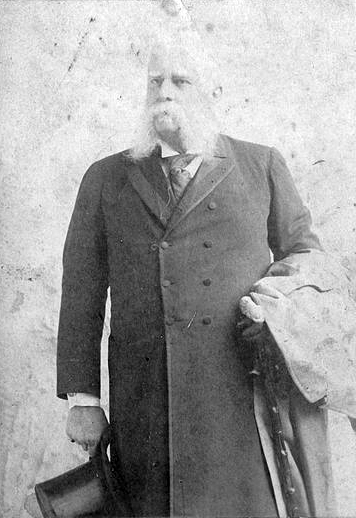
Samuel Lawrence James

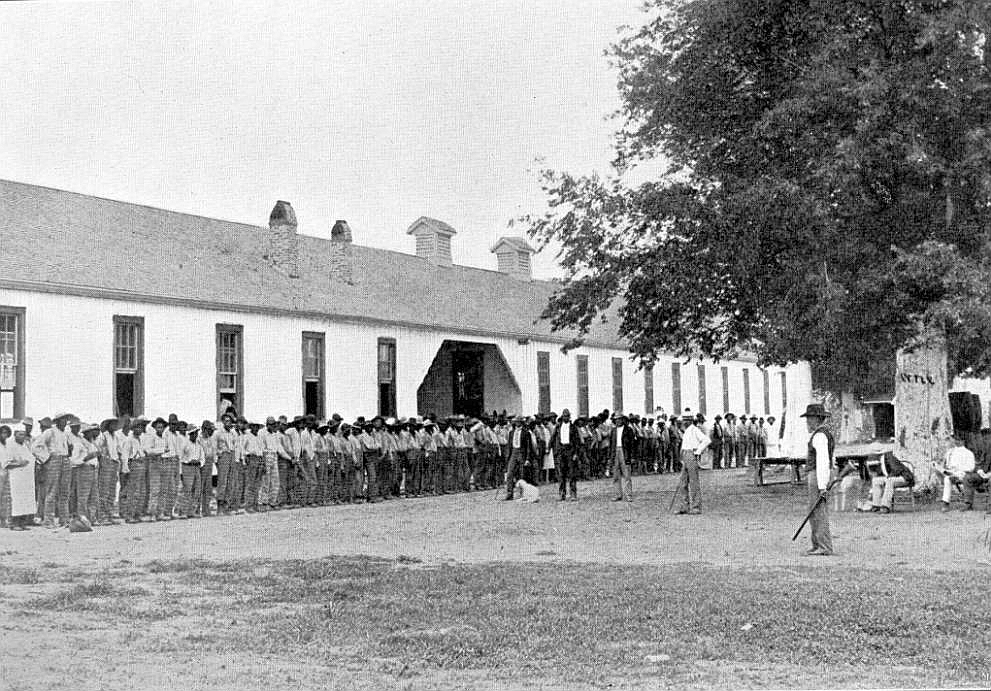
Quarters C, 1901

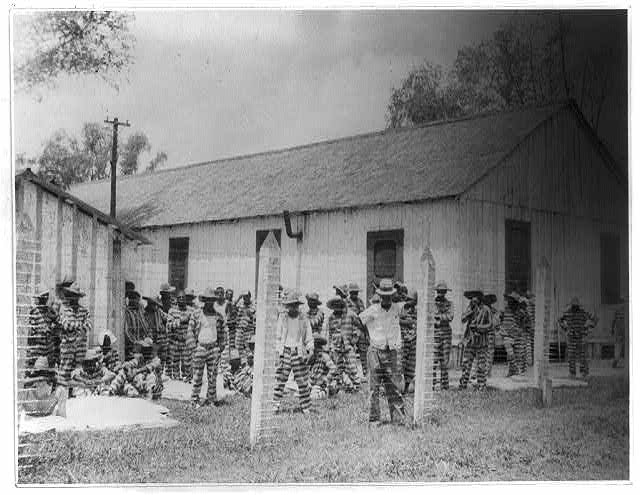
Prison camp, July 1934. In the photo is Lead Belly, a singer who was jailed at Angola when recorded by Alan Lomax.

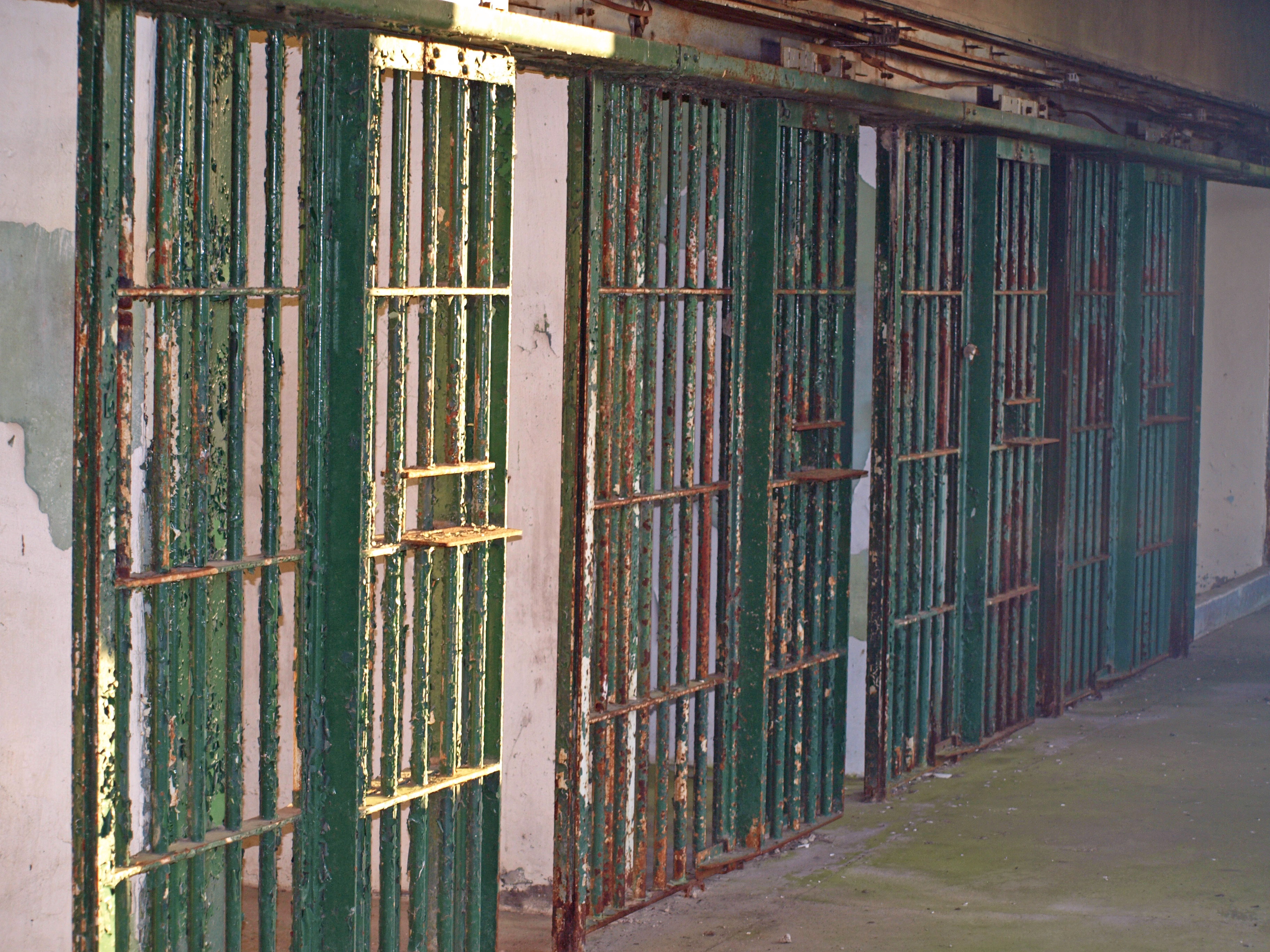
Old cell block no longer in use

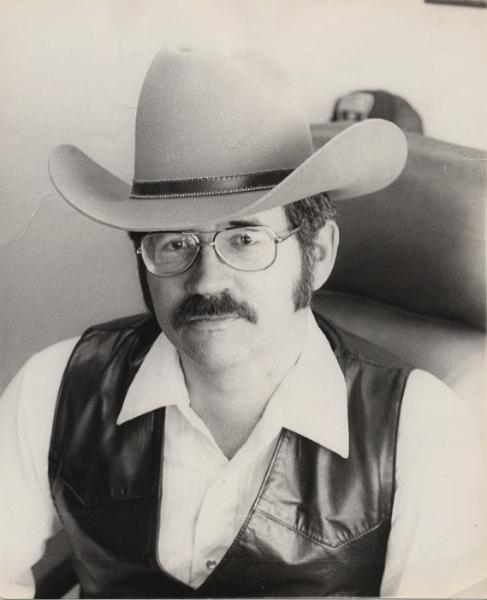
John Whitley, who served as a warden at Angola

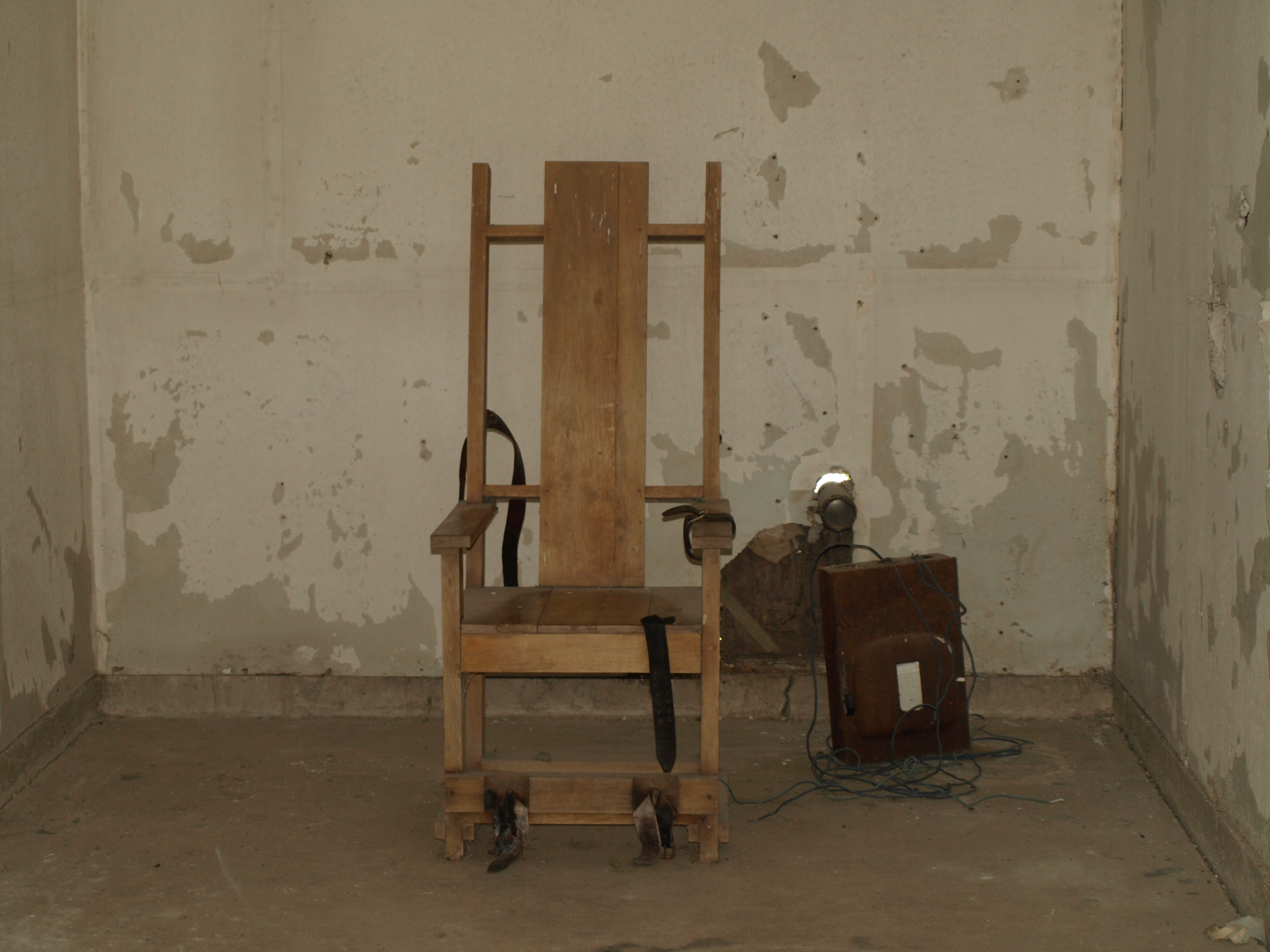
The former Angola execution chamber at the Red Hat Cell Block. The electric chair is a replica of the original "Gruesome Gertie".

The 28 square miles (73 square kilometers) of land the correctional facility sits on what was known before the American Civil War as the Angola Plantations, a slave plantation owned by slave trader Isaac Franklin. It became known as Angola, and nicknamed the "Alcatraz of the South", "The Angola Plantation" and "The Farm."

Before 1835, state inmates were held in a jail in New Orleans. The first Louisiana State Penitentiary, located at the intersection of 6th and Laurel streets in Baton Rouge, Louisiana, was modeled on a prison in Wethersfield, Connecticut. It was built to house 100 convicts in cells of 6 ft × 3 1/2 ft (1.8 m × 1.1 m). In 1844, the state leased operation of the prison and its prisoners to McHatton Pratt and Company, a private company.

During the American Civil War, Union soldiers occupied the prison in Baton Rouge. In 1869, during the Reconstruction era, Samuel Lawrence James, a former Confederate major, received the military lease to the future prison property along the Mississippi River. He tried to produce cotton with the forced labor of convicts, principally African Americans.

The land developed as Angola Penitentiary was purchased in the 1830s from Francis Rout as four contiguous plantations by Isaac Franklin. He was a planter and slave trader, co-owner of the profitable slave trading firm Franklin and Armfield, of Alexandria, Virginia, and Natchez, Mississippi. After he died in 1846, Franklin's widow, by then known as Adelicia Cheatham, joined these plantations: Panola, Belle View, Killarney, and Angola, when she sold them all in 1880 to Samuel Lawrence James, the former CSA officer. The Angola plantation was named after the country on the west coast of Southern Africa, from which many enslaved people had come. It contained a building called the Old Slave Quarters.

Under the convict lease system, Major James ran his vast plantation using convicts leased from the state as his workers. He was responsible for their room and board and had total authority over them. With the incentive to earn money from prisoners, the state passed laws directed at African Americans, requiring payment of minor fees and fines as punishment for infractions. Cash-poor men in the agricultural economy were forced into jail and convict labor. Such convicts were frequently abused, underfed, and subject to unregulated violence. The state exercised little oversight of conditions. Prisoners were often worked to death under harsh conditions. James died in 1894.

=== 20th century operations ===
The facility opened as a state prison in 1901. The state began transferring prison facilities out of the old penitentiary into Angola. The old penitentiary continued to be used as a receiving station, hospital, clothing, and shoe factory, and place for executions until it finally closed in 1917. The history and archaeology of the old penitentiary provides insights into inmates' structures and daily life.

In September 1928, prisoners Cleveland Owen, Steven J. Beck, and James Heard took two prison guards hostage and escaped from Camp E armed with .45 Colt automatics. Ten additional prisoners followed them out of the gates. The break was thwarted when the anticipated ferry was not positioned on the river's prison side. A gunfight between guards and prisoners ensued, leaving five prisoners dead. According to contemporary news reports, twenty-six persons were shot. "Trusty" prisoners who assisted the guards later sought pardons from Governor Huey Long.

Charles Wolfe and Kip Lornell, authors of The Life and Legend of Leadbelly, stated that Angola was "probably as close to slavery as any person could come in 1930." Hardened criminals broke down upon being notified that they were being sent to Angola. White-black racial tensions in the society were expressed at the prison, adding to the violence: each year, one in every ten inmates was stabbed. Wolfe and Lornell stated that the staff, consisting of 90 people, "ran the prison like it was a private fiefdom."

The two authors stated that prisoners were viewed as the "'worst of the lowest order". The state did not appropriate many funds for the operation of Angola and saved money by trying to decrease costs. Much of the remaining money ended up in the operations of other state projects; Wolfe and Lornell stated that the re-appropriation of funds occurred "mysteriously".

In 1935, remains of a Native American individual were taken from Angola and were donated to the Louisiana State University Museum of Natural Science.

In 1948, governor Earl Kemp Long appointed Rollo C. Lawrence, a former mayor of Pineville, as the first Angola superintendent. Long subsequently established the warden position as one of political patronage. Long appointed distant relatives as wardens of the prison.

In the institution's history, the electric chair, Gruesome Gertie, was stored at Angola. Because West Feliciana Parish did not want to be associated with state executions, for some time, the state transported the chair to the parish of conviction of a condemned prisoner before executing them.

A former Angola prisoner, William Sadler (also called "Wooden Ear" because of hearing loss he suffered after a prison attack), wrote a series of articles about Angola in the 1940s. Hell on Angola helped bring about prison reform.

In February 1951, 31 inmates, in protest of the prison's conditions, cut their own Achilles tendons. Unable to use both feet, the inmates hopped around and sang "The Heel-String Boogie", and the group was labeled the Heel String Gang. When the protest made headlines, Long convened a committee of 32 judges, law officers and media members to investigate conditions at the prison. By May, the number of inmates who had slashed their Achilles tendons had risen to 55. However, the protest was successful; the committee recommended several reforms, including the abolition of corporal punishment at the prison. In its November 22, 1952 issue, Collier's Magazine referred to Angola as "the worst prison in America". In addition, Margaret Dixon, managing editor of the Baton Rouge Morning Advocate for two decades, worked for prison reform, specifically, construction of other facilities to reduce the population at Angola. The new Margaret Dixon Correctional Institution opened in 1976 and was named for her.

On December 5, 1956, five men escaped by digging out of the prison grounds and swimming across the Mississippi River. They were Robert Wallace, 25; Wallace McDonald, 23; Vernon Roy Ingram, 21; Glenn Holiday, 20; and Frank Verbon Gann, 30. The Hope Star newspaper of Arkansas reported that one body (believed to be Wallace) was recovered from the river.

McDonald was captured later in Texas, after returning to the United States from Mexico. McDonald said that two of his fellow escapees drowned, but warden Maurice Sigler disputed this. Sigler said that he believed no more than one inmate drowned. His men had found three clear sets of tracks climbing up the river bank.

Gann's family wrote to Sigler on multiple occasions, requesting that he declare the escaped prisoner dead to free up benefits for his children. Although the family never heard again from Gann, Sigler refused to declare him dead, saying that he was likely in Mexico. Gann had been imprisoned in Angola after escaping from the Opelousas Parish Jail on April 29, 1956, where he was serving a relatively minor charge for car theft.

In 1961, female inmates were moved from Angola to the newly opened Louisiana Correctional Institute for Women.

In 1971, the American Bar Association criticized the conditions at Angola. Linda Ashton of the Associated Press stated that the bar association described Angola as "medieval, squalid and horrifying". In 1972, Elayne Hunt, a reforming director of corrections, was appointed by Governor Edwin Edwards. The U.S. courts in Gates v. Collier ordered Louisiana to clean up Angola once and for all, ordering the end of the Trustee-Officer and Trusty systems.

Efforts to reform and improve conditions at Angola have continued. In 1975, U.S. District Judge Frank Polozola of Baton Rouge, Louisiana, declared conditions at Angola to be in a state of emergency. The state installed Ross Maggio as the warden. Prisoners nicknamed Maggio "the gangster" because he strictly adhered to rules. Ashton said that, by most accounts, Maggio had improved conditions. Maggio retired in 1984.

In the 1980s, Kirksey Nix perpetrated the "Angola Lonely Hearts" scam from within the prison.

On June 21, 1989, US District Judge Polozola declared a new state of emergency at Angola.

In 1993, Angola officers fatally shot 29-year-old escapee Tyrone Brown.

Burl Cain served as the warden from 1995 to March 7, 2016. He was known for numerous improvements, lowering the prison violence rate, and numerous criminal allegations.

In 1999, six inmates who were serving life sentences for murder took three officers hostage in Camp D. The hostage takers bludgeoned and fatally stabbed 49-year-old Captain David Knapps. Armed officers ended the rebellion by shooting the inmates, killing 26-year-old Joel Durham, and seriously wounding another.

=== 21st century ===
In 2004, Paul Harris of The Guardian wrote, "Unsurprisingly, Angola has always been famed for brutality, riots, escape and murder."

On August 31, 2008, New Orleans mayor Ray Nagin stated in a press conference that anyone arrested for looting during the evacuation of the city due to Hurricane Gustav would not be housed in the city/parish jail, but instead sent directly to Angola to await trial.

As evidence that the prison had retained its notoriety, Nagin warned:

Anybody who is caught looting in the city of New Orleans will go directly to Angola. Directly to Angola. You will not have a temporary stay in the city. You go directly to the big house, in general population. All right? So, I want to make sure that every looter, potential looter, understands that. You will go directly to Angola Prison. And God bless you when you go there.

In 2009, the prison reduced its budget by $12 million by "double bunking" (installing bunk beds to increase the capacity of dormitories), reducing overtime, and replacing officers with security cameras.

In 2012, 1,000 prisoners were transferred to Angola from C. Paul Phelps Correctional Center, which had closed. The state government did not increase the prison's budget or hire additional employees.

On March 11, 2014, Glenn Ford, a man wrongfully convicted of murder and Louisiana's longest-serving death row prisoner, walked free after a court overturned his conviction a day earlier when petitioned by prosecutors. Ford had spent nearly three decades at the prison, with 26 years in solitary confinement on death row. The state's policy was to house death row prisoners in solitary confinement, but lengthy appeals have created new harsh conditions of extended solitary. Convicts and their defense counsels have challenged such lengthy stays in solitary confinement, which is harmful to both mental and physical health and has been considered to be "cruel and unusual punishment" under the US Constitution.

In March 2019, seven members of staff at the facility were arrested for rape, smuggling items to inmates, and maintaining personal relationships with prisoners.

In 2020, regarding the COVID-19 pandemic in Louisiana, ProPublica wrote that prisoners alleged that deliberately low testing rates masked an epidemic in the prison. Prison officials denied the prisoner's allegations. Prisoners also allege they were treated with over-the-counter medications, and "four of the 12 prisoners who have died in the pandemic...had been denied needed medical help for days because their symptoms were not considered sufficiently serious". ProPublica also wrote that some sick inmates "concealed their symptoms to try to avoid losing their freedom of movement and other privileges" because of extended quarantines.

In 2023, U.S. District Judge Shelly Dick, ruled that the juvenile detainees in Louisiana State Penitientary were being held in conditions that were unconstitutional and ordered their removal from temporary lockup. Legal advocates like the American Civil Liberties Union and the Southern Poverty Law Center were involved in advocating for the juvenile detainees, mostly black boys, to be removed from Angola, citing concerns about their mental health, access to education, and the excessive heat in the former death row unit the boys were being held in.

In 2025, with funding from the One Big Beautiful Bill Act, former solitary confinement unit Camp J was re-opened as an immigrant detention site dubbed Camp 57 or Louisiana Lockup, named after 57th governor of Louisiana Jeff Landry.

== Management ==
Louisiana Department of Corrections patch with Angola Tab

Louisiana State Penitentiary was designed to be as self-sufficient as possible; it functioned as a miniature community with a canning factory, a dairy, a mail system, a small ranch, repair shops, and a sugar mill. Inmates raised food staples and cash crops. The self-sufficiency was enacted so taxpayers would spend less money and so politicians such as Governor of Louisiana Huey P. Long would have an improved public image. In the 1930s, inmates worked from dawn until dusk.

As of 2009, there are three levels of solitary confinement. "Extended lockdown" is colloquially known as "Closed Cell Restricted" or "CCR". Until a period before 2009, death row inmates had more privileges than "extended lockdown" inmates, including the privilege of watching television.

"Extended lockdown" was initially intended as a temporary punishment. The next most restrictive level was, in 2009, "Camp J", referring to an inmate housing unit that houses solitary confinement. The most restrictive level is "administrative segregation", colloquially referred to by inmates as the "dungeon" or the "hole".

== Location ==
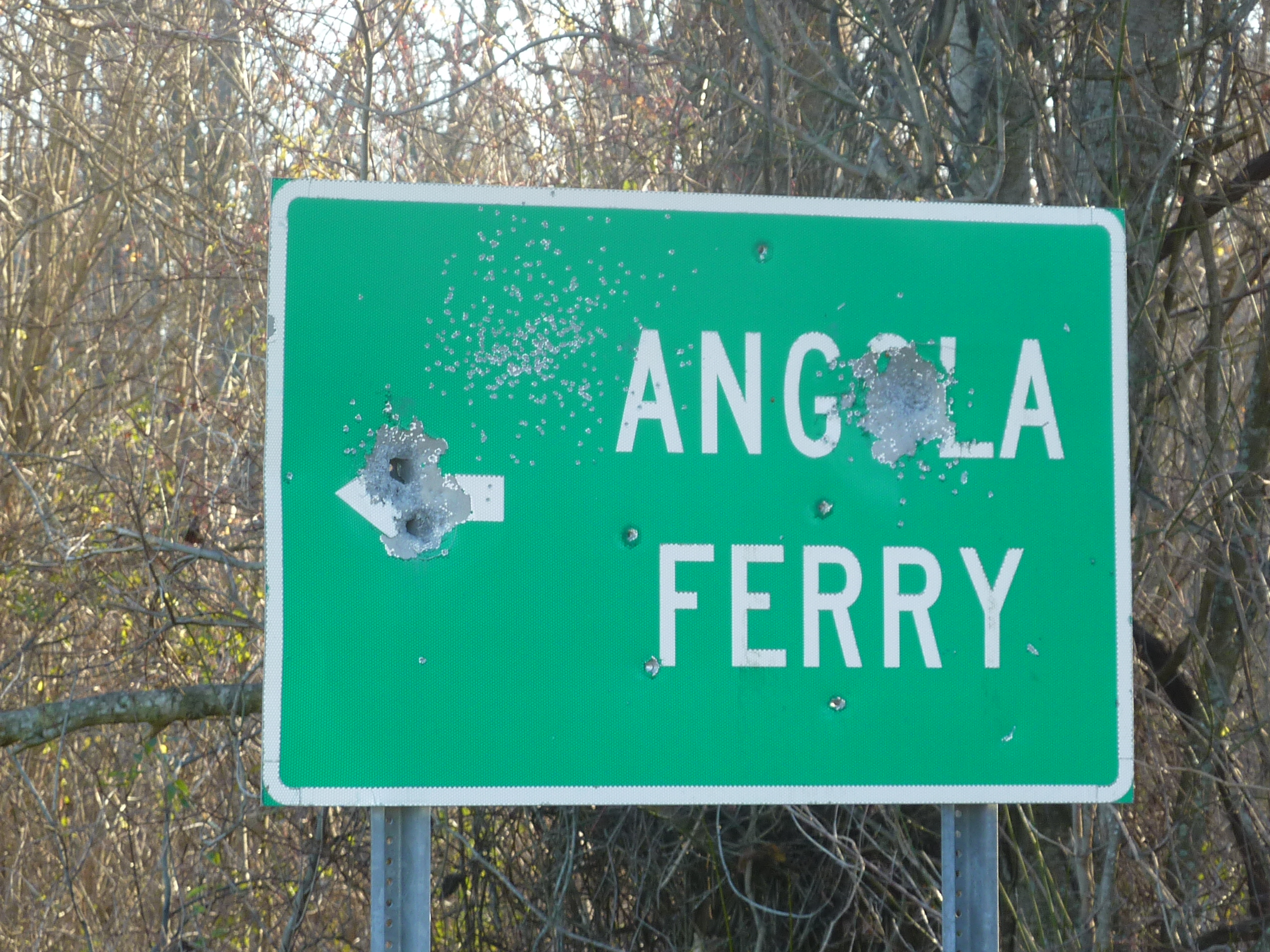
The sign indicating the Angola Ferry

Louisiana State Penitentiary is in unincorporated West Feliciana Parish, in east central Louisiana. It is located at the base of the Tunica Hills, in a region described by Jenny Lee Rice of Paste as "breathtakingly beautiful".

The prison is about 22 miles (35 km) northwest of St. Francisville, about 50 miles (80 km) northwest of Baton Rouge, and 135 miles (217 km) northwest of New Orleans. Angola is about an hour's drive from Baton Rouge, and it is about a two-hour driving distance from New Orleans. The Mississippi River borders the facility on three sides. The prison is near the Louisiana-Mississippi border. Angola is located about 34 miles (55 km) from the Dixon Correctional Institute.

Charles Wolfe and Kip Lornell, authors of The Life and Legend of Leadbelly, stated that in the 1990s, the prison remained "far away from public awareness". The prison officials sometimes provide meals for official guests because of what the Louisiana Department of Public Safety and Corrections refers to as the "extreme remote location" of Angola; the nearest non-prison dining facility is, as of 1999, 30 miles (48 km) away. The prison property is adjacent to the Angola Tract of the Tunica Hills Wildlife Management Area. Due to security reasons regarding Angola, the Tunica Hills WMA's Angola Tract is closed to the general public from March 1 through August 31 every year.

The main entrance is at the terminus of Louisiana Highway 66, a road described by Wolfe and Lornell as "a winding, often muddy state road". From St. Francisville one would travel about 2 miles (3.2 km) north along U.S. Highway 61, turn left at Louisiana 66, and travel on that road for 20 miles (32 km) until it dead ends at Angola's front gate. The Angola Ferry provides a ferry service between Angola and a point in unincorporated Pointe Coupee Parish. The ferry is open only to employees except during special events, when members of the general public may use it.

== Composition ==
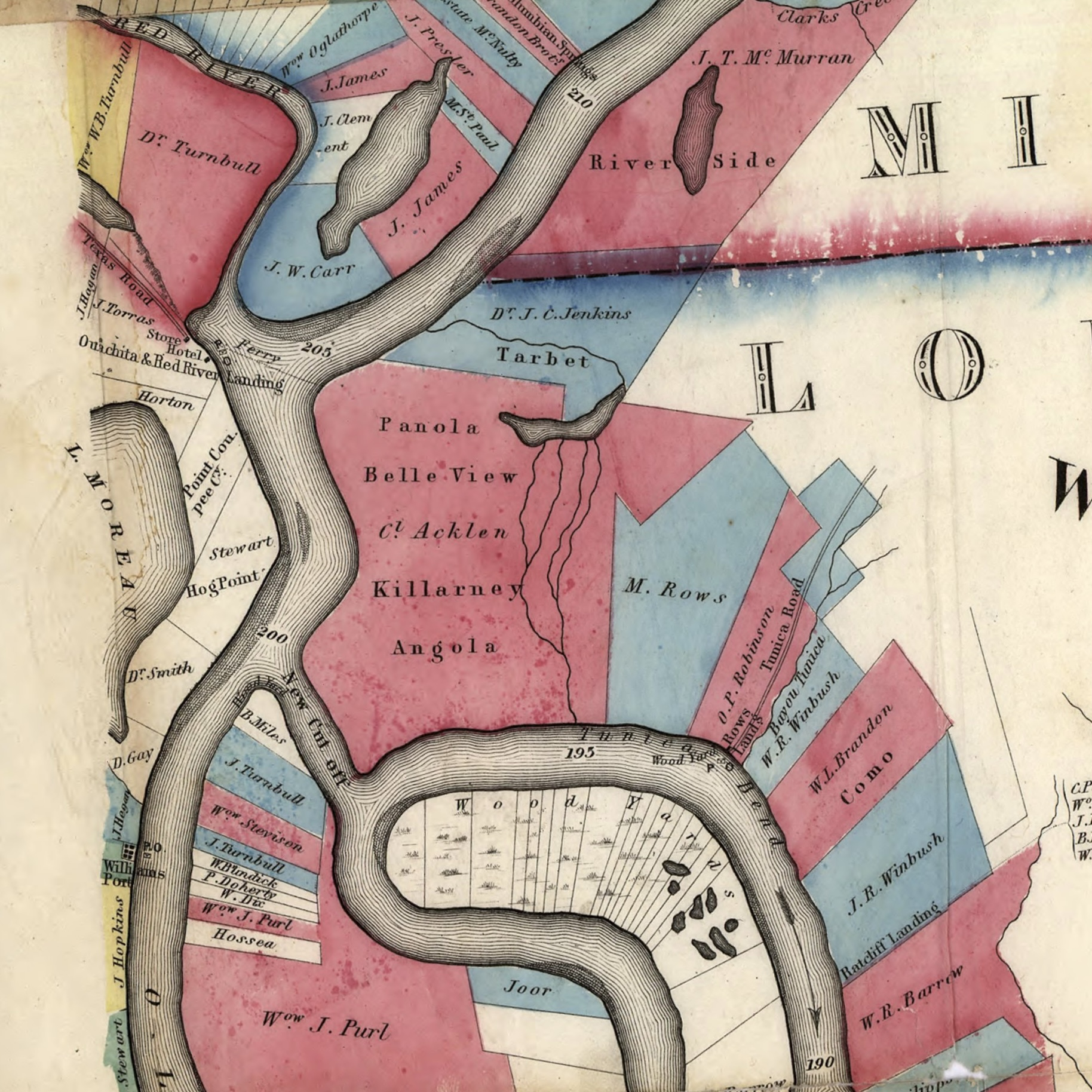
Map of Adelicia Acklen's Panola, Belle View, Killarney, and Angola plantations in Louisiana in 1858

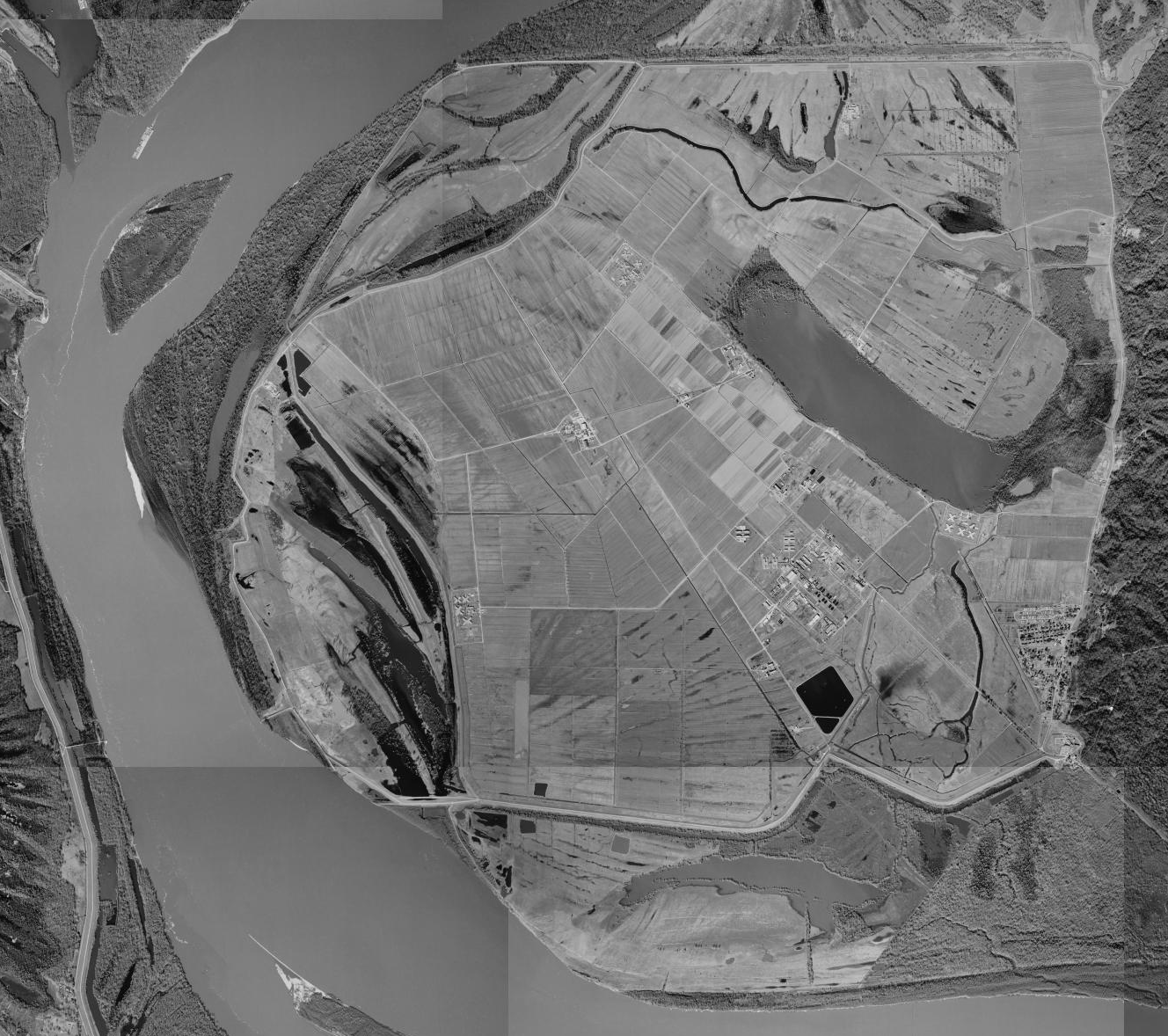
An aerial view of Louisiana State Penitentiary, January 10, 1998, U.S. Geological Survey

The 18,000-acre (7,300 ha) prison property occupies a 28-square-mile (73 km^{2}) area. The size of the prison property is larger than the size of Manhattan. Charles Wolfe and Kip Lornell, authors of The Life and Legend of Leadbelly, stated that Angola of the 1990s looks "more like a large working plantation than one of the most notorious prisons in the United States." Officers patrol the complex on horseback, as many prison acres are devoted to cultivating crops. By 1999, the prison's primary roads had been paved.

The Tunica Hills and the Mississippi River surround the prison property. The perimeter of the property is not fenced, while the individual prisoner dormitory and recreational camps are fenced. Most prison buildings are yellow with a red trim.

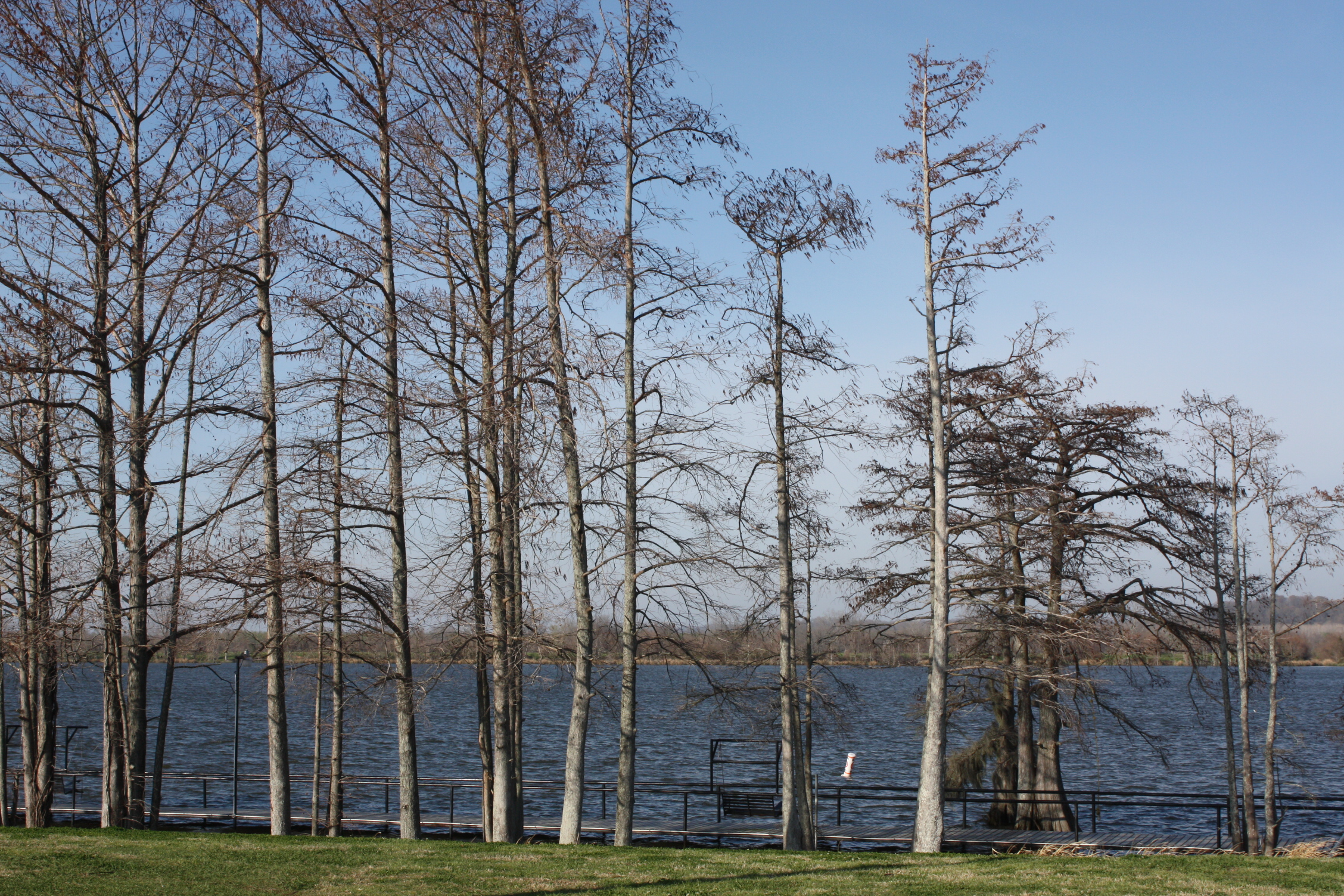
Lake Killarney, a geographic feature of Angola

=== Inmate quarters ===
The state of Louisiana considers Angola to be a multi-security institution. 29% of the prison's beds are designated for maximum security inmates. The inmates live in several housing units scattered across the Angola grounds. By the 1990s, air conditioning and heating units had been installed in the inmate housing units.

Most inmates live in dormitories instead of cell blocks. The prison administration states that having "inmates of all ages and with long sentences live this way encourages cooperation and healthy peer relationships."

==== Main Prison Complex ====
The Main Prison Complex consists of the East Yard and the West Yard. The East Yard has 16 minimum and medium custody prisoner dormitories and one maximum custody extended lockdown cellblock; the cellblock houses long-term extended-lockdown prisoners, in-transit administrative segregation prisoners, inmates who need mental health attention, and protective-custody inmates.

The West Yard has 16 minimum and medium custody prisoner dormitories, two administrative segregation cellblocks, and the prison treatment center. The treatment center houses geriatric, hospice, and ill in-transit prisoners. As of 1999, the main prison complex houses half of Angola's prisoners.

Dormitories within the main prison include the Ash, Cypress, Hickory, Magnolia, Oak, Pine, Spruce, and Walnut dormitories. The cell blocks are A, B, C, and D. The main prison also houses the local Main Prison administration building, a gymnasium, a kitchen/dining facility, the Angola Vocational School, and the Judge Henry A. Politz Educational building.

==== Outcamps ====
Louisiana State Penitenitiary also has several outcamps. Camp C includes eight minimum and medium custody dormitories, one cellblock with administrative segregation and working cellblock prisoners, and one extended lockdown cellblock. Camp C includes the Bear and Wolf dormitories and Jaguar and Tiger cellblocks. Camp D has the same features as Camp C, except that it has one working cellblock instead of an extended lockdown cellblock, and its other cellblock does not have working prisoners. Camp D houses the Eagle and Falcon dormitories and the Hawk and Raven cellblocks.

Camp F has four minimum custody dormitories and the "Dog Pen", which houses 11 minimum custody inmates. All of the prisoners housed in Camp F are "trusties", who mop floors, deliver food to fellow prisoners, and perform other support tasks. Camp F also houses Angola's execution chamber. Camp F has a lake where trusties fish. A prisoner quoted in Self-governance, Normalcy and Control: Inmate-produced Media at the Louisiana State Penitentiary at Angola described Camp F as being "off from the rest of the prison".

The Close Cell Restricted (CCR) unit, an isolation unit located near the Angola main entrance, has 101 isolation cells and 40 trustee beds. Jimmy LeBlanc, the corrections secretary, said in October 2010 that the State of Louisiana could save about $1.8 million during the remaining nine months of the 2010–2011 fiscal year if it closed CCR and moved prisoners to unused death row cells and possibly some Camp D double bunks. LeBlanc said that the prisoners in isolation would remain isolated.

Camp J, consisting mostly of solitary confinement cells, was in operation until its 2018 closure. It has four extended lockdown cellblocks, which contained prisoners with disciplinary problems, and one dormitory with minimum and medium custody inmates who provide housekeeping functions for Camp J. Camp J housed the Alligator, Barracuda, Gar, and Shark cellblocks. In 2025, Camp J was reopened as Camp 57, an immigration detention unit.

===== Reception center and death row =====
The Reception Center, the closest prison housing building to the main entrance, acts as a reception center for arriving prisoners. It is inside the main gate to the right of the main highway. In addition, it contains the death row for male inmates in Louisiana, with 101 extended lockdown cells housing condemned inmates. The death row facility has a central room and multiple tiers. The entrance to each tier includes a locked door and color photographs of the prisoners in each tier.

Death row includes eight tiers, lettered A to G. Seven tiers have 15 cells each, while one tier has 11. Each hallway has a cell for showering. The death row houses exercise areas with basketball posts. The death row facility was constructed in 2006 without air conditioning or cross ventilation. In addition, the Reception Center has one minimum custody dormitory with inmates who provide housekeeping for the facility.

In June 2013, three prisoners filed a federal lawsuit against the prison in the court in Baton Rouge, alleging that the death row facility does not have adequate measures to prevent overheating. The prisoners said that due to pre-existing medical conditions, the heat may cause health problems. Brian A. Jackson, the district federal judge, ordered temperature data collection at the Angola death row for three weeks to determine the conditions. During that time, Angola officials blasted the outer walls of the prison with water cannons and installed window awnings to attempt to lower temperature data. In response, Jackson said that he was "troubled" by the possibility of manipulating the temperature data.

On Monday, August 5, 2013,, the federal trial regarding the condition of the death row in high heat started. The following day, Warden Burl Cain apologized for violating the court order regarding data collection. On Wednesday, August 7, 2013, closing arguments in the trial ended. In December 2013, U.S. District Judge Brian Jackson ruled that the heat index of the prison was cruel and unusual punishment, and therefore, a cooling system must be installed. By 2014, a court-ordered plan to install a cooling system was underway.

As of May 2019, the issue was close to being resolved after a 6-year-long court battle. A settlement has been reached between the death row inmates and the prison. The settlement agreement calls for daily showers for the three Angola inmates of at least 15 minutes; individual ice containers that are replenished promptly by prison staff; individual fans; water faucets in their cells; "IcyBreeze" units or so-called "Cajun coolers"; and the diversion of cool air from the death row guard pod into their cells.

=== B-Line ===
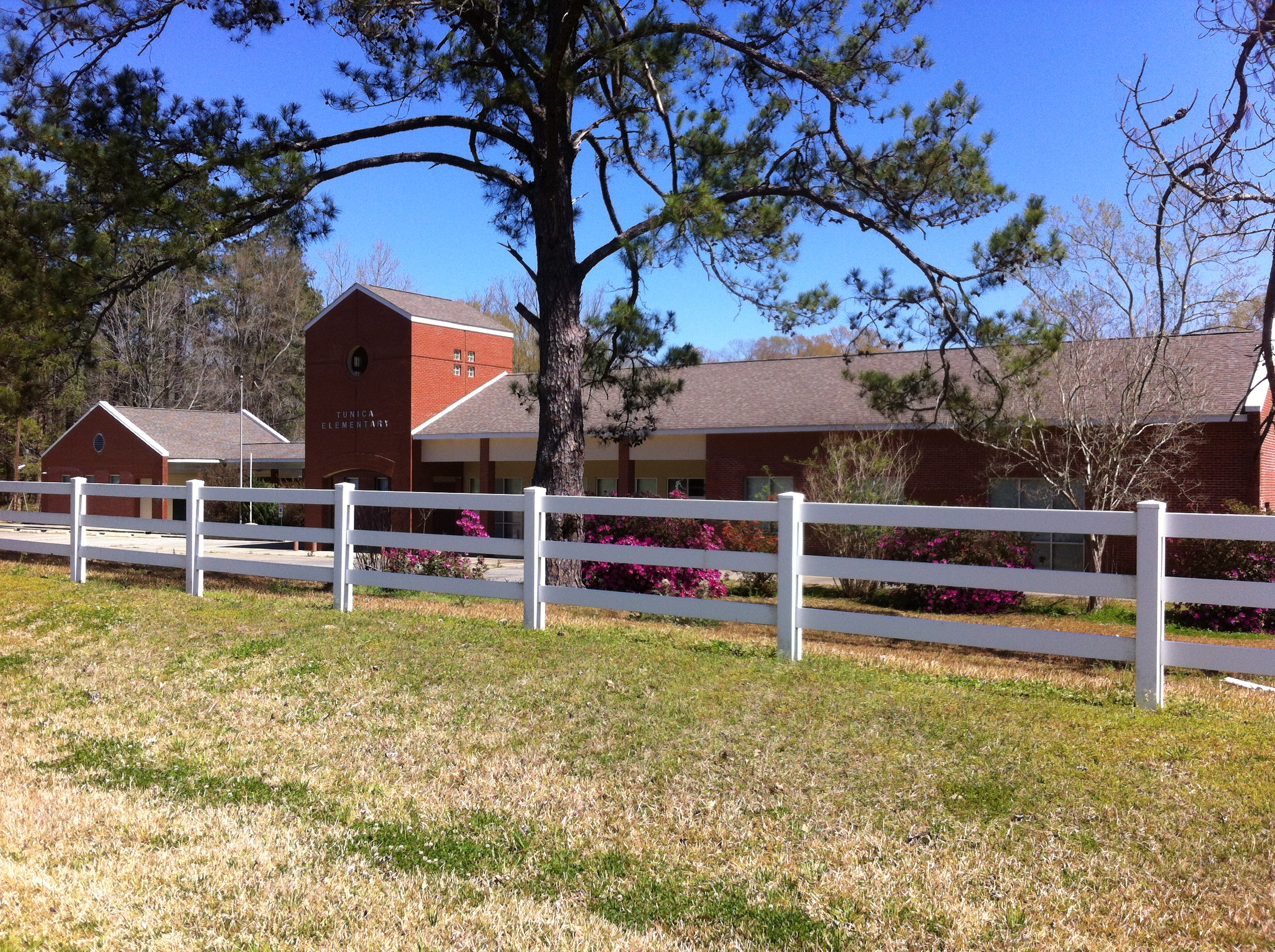
Tunica Elementary School previously served children living on the Angola property

The facility includes a group of houses called the "B-Line", which function as residences for prison staff members and their families; inmates perform services for the staff members and their households. The employee housing includes recreational centers, pools, and parks. The Angola B-Line Chapel was dedicated on Friday, July 17, 2009.

Residents on the prison grounds are zoned to West Feliciana Parish Public Schools. Primary schools serving the Angola grounds include Bains Lower Elementary School and Bains Elementary School in Bains. Secondary schools serving the Angola grounds are West Feliciana Middle School and West Feliciana High School in Bains. The West Feliciana Parish Library is located in St. Francisville. The library, previously a part of the Audubon Regional Library System, became independent in January 2004. West Feliciana Parish is in the service area of Baton Rouge Community College.

Previously, elementary school children attended Tunica Elementary School in Tunica, Louisiana, located in proximity to Angola. The school building, four miles (six kilometers) from Angola, is several miles from Angola's main entrance, and many of its students lived on the Angola grounds. On May 18, 2011, due to budget cuts, the parish school board voted to close Tunica Elementary.

=== Fire station ===
The fire station houses the Angola Emergency Medical Services Department staff, who provide fire and emergency services to the prison. The Angola Fire Department is registered as department number 63001 with the Louisiana Fire Marshal's Office. The department's equipment includes one engine, tanker, and rescue truck. Within Angola, the department protects 500 buildings, including employee and prisoner housing quarters. The department has mutual aid agreements with West Feliciana Parish and with Wilkinson County, Mississippi.

=== Religious sites ===
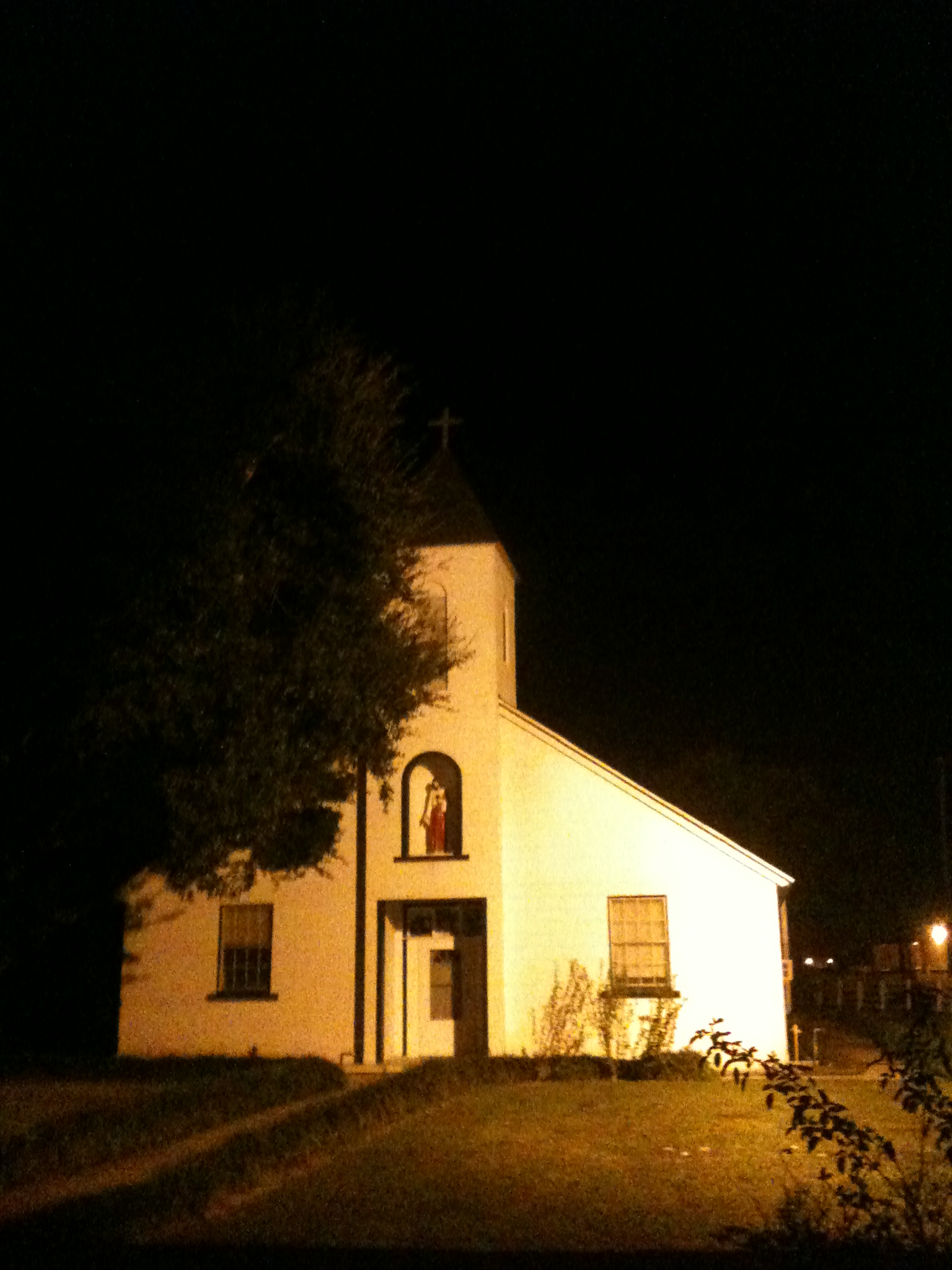
St. Augustine Roman Catholic Church

The main entrance to Angola has an etched monument that refers to Epistle to the Philippians 3:15.

Reflecting the historic dominance of the Catholic church in south Louisiana, St. Augustine Church was built in the early 1950s and is staffed by the Roman Catholic Church. The New Life Interfaith Chapel was dedicated in 1982.

In the 2000s, the main prison church, the churches for Camps C and D, and a grounds chapel were constructed as part of an effort to build chapels for every state-run prison facility. A staff and family of staff chapel was also under construction. Outside donations and ticket sales from the prison rodeo funded these churches. The Camp C Chapel and the B-Line Chapel were dedicated the same day.

In December 2013, Our Lady of Guadalupe Chapel, a 6,000-square-foot (560 m^{2}) structure built with over $450,000 worth of materials donated by Latin American businessmen Jorge Valdes and Fernando Garcia, was opened. The interfaith church was built in 38 days by 50 prisoners, designed to resemble The Alamo in San Antonio, Texas, and "includes seating for more than 200 and features paintings, furniture and stained-glass windows crafted by inmates."

=== Recreational facilities ===
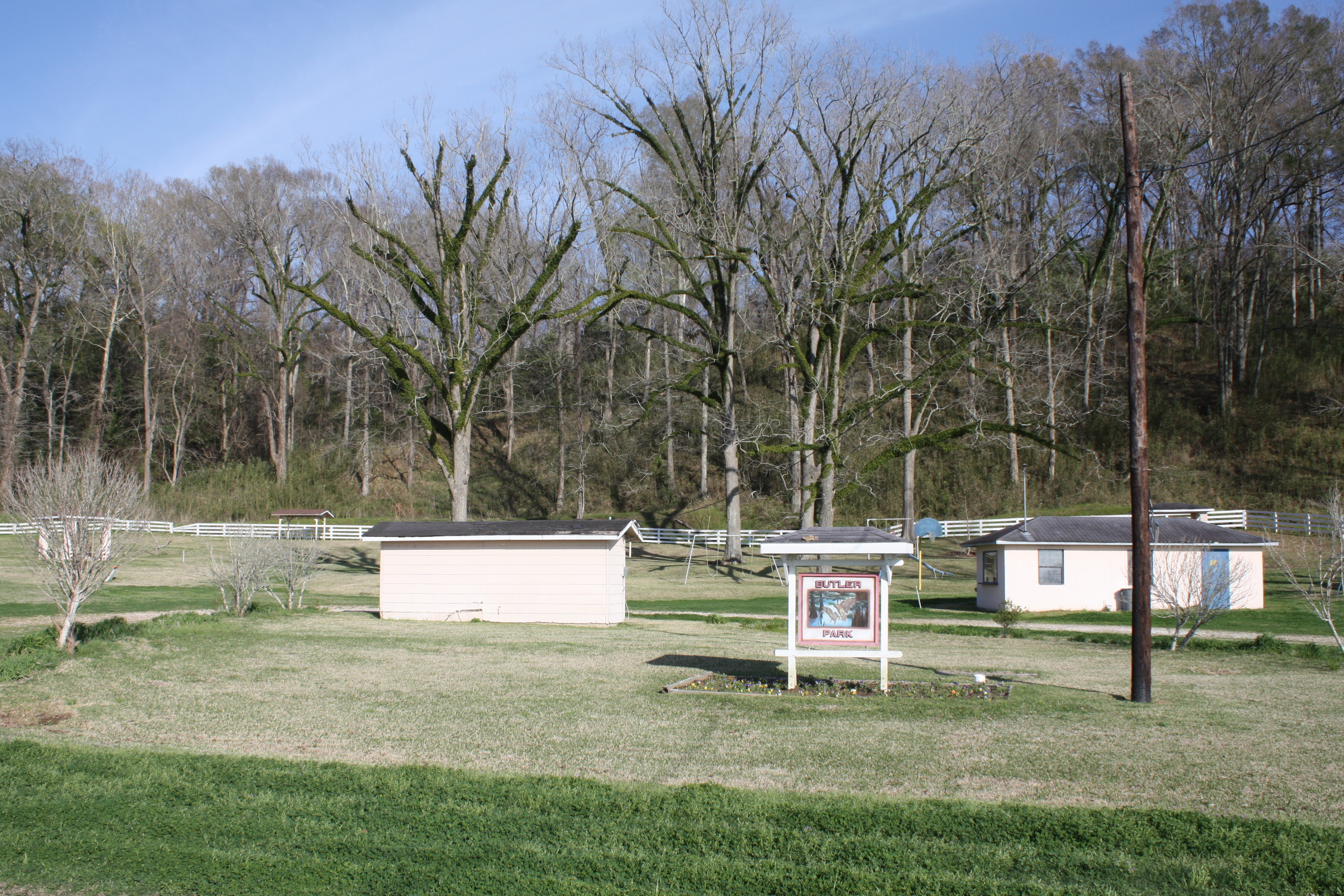
Butler Park

Prison staff members have access to recreational facilities on the Angola property. Angola has ball fields, the Prison View Golf Course, a swimming pool, a tennis court, and a walking track. Lake Killarney, an oxbow lake of the Mississippi River located on the prison grounds, has large crappie fish. The prison administration controls access to Lake Killarney, and few people fish there. The crappie fish grow very large.

Butler Park is a recreational facility on the edge of the Angola property. It houses gazebos, picnic tables, and barbecue pits. As of 1986, a prisoner who has no major disciplinary issues for at least a year may use the property.

==== Prison View Golf Course ====
Prison View Golf Course, a 6,000-yard (5,500 m), 9-hole, 36-par golf course, is located on the grounds of Louisiana State Penitentiary. Prison View, the only golf course on the property of an American prison, is between the Tunica Hills and Camp J, at the intersection of B-Line Road and Camp J Road. All individuals wishing to play must provide personal information 48 hours before arrival so that the prison authorities can conduct background checks. Convicted felons and individuals on visitation lists cannot play on the golf course. Current prisoners at Angola are not permitted to play on the golf course.

The golf course, constructed on a former bull pasture site, opened in June 2004. Inmates performed most of the work to construct the course. Prisoners that the administration considers to be the most trustworthy are permitted to work at the golf course. Warden Burl Cain said he built the course so employees would be encouraged to stay at Angola over weekends. He wanted them available to provide support in case of an emergency.

=== Guest house ===
The "Ranch House" is a facility for prison guests. James Ridgeway of Mother Jones described it as "a sort of clubhouse where the wardens and other officials get together in a convivial atmosphere for chow prepared by inmate cooks." Originally constructed to serve as a conference center to supplement the meeting room in the LSP administration building, the "Ranch House" received its name after Burl Cain was selected as Warden. Cain had the building renovated to accommodate overnight guests. The renovations, which included converting one room into a bedroom and adding a shower and fireplace, cost approximately $7,346. Traditionally, inmates who worked successfully in the Ranch House were later assigned to work as cooks at the Louisiana Governor's Mansion.

=== Cemeteries ===
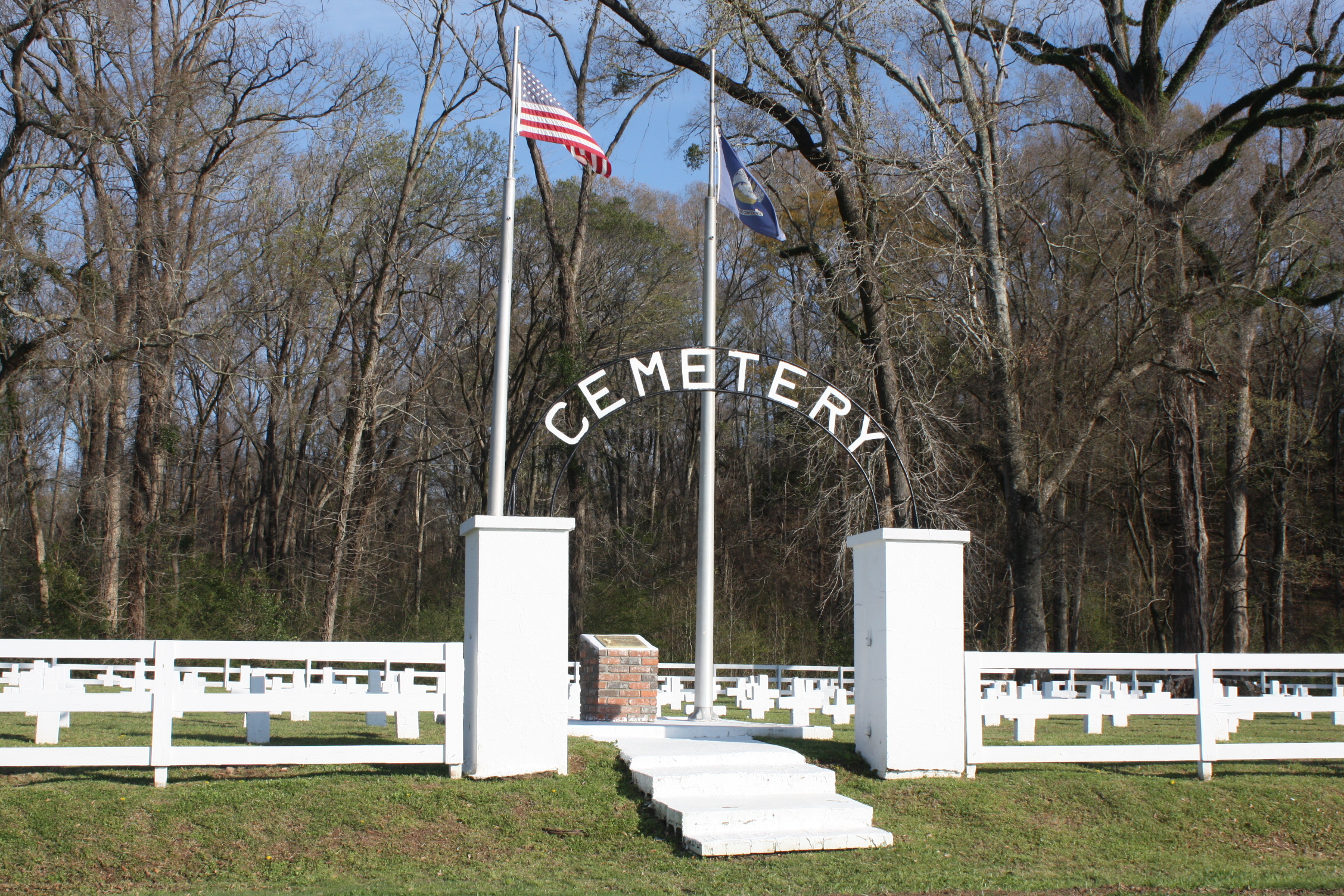
Point Lookout Cemetery, established after 1927; one of the prison cemeteries on the Angola property

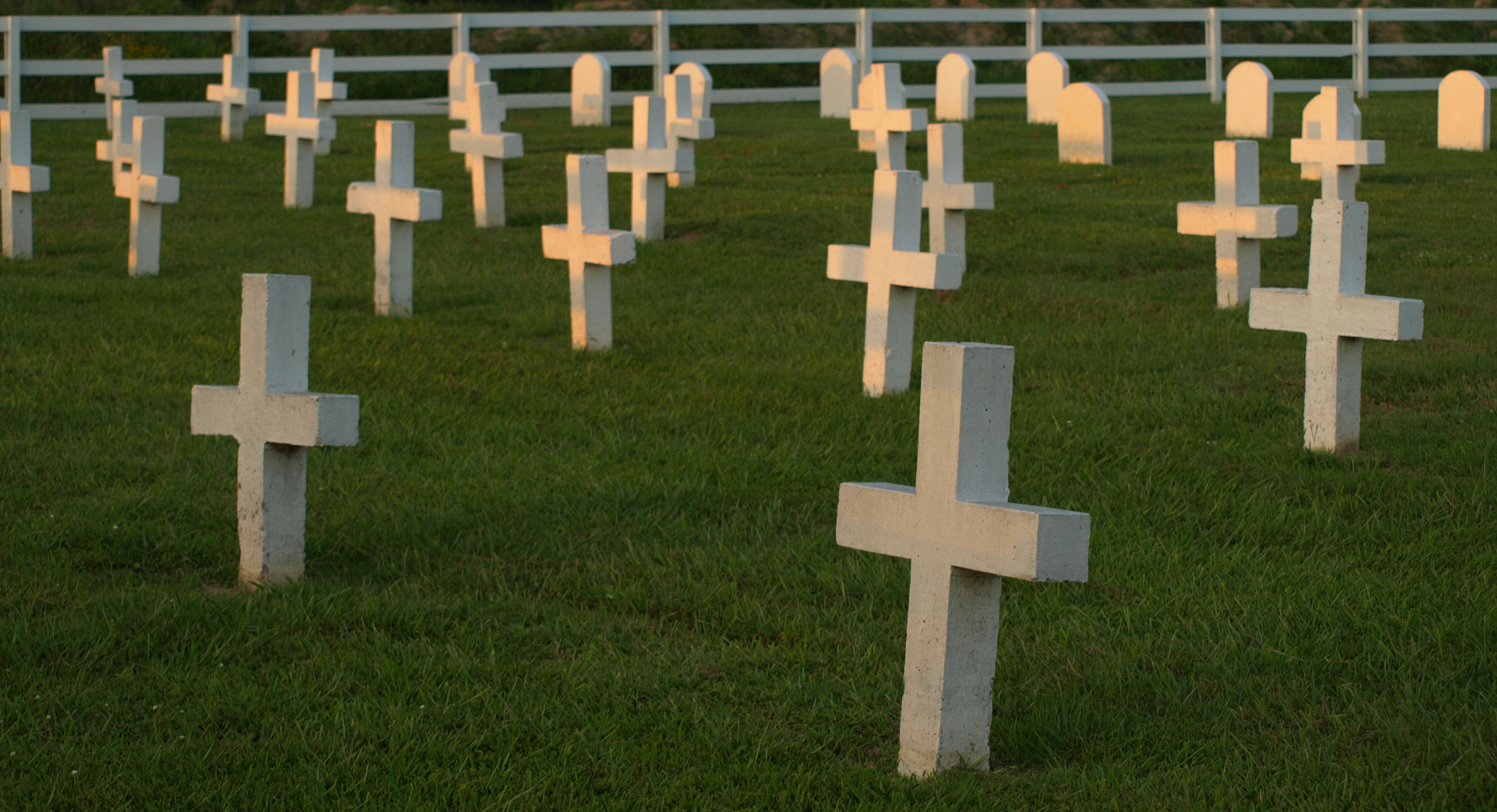
Point Lookout II

Point Lookout Cemetery is the prison cemetery, located on the north side of the Angola property, at the base of the Tunica Hills. Deceased prisoners from all state prisons had been buried here who were not claimed and transported elsewhere by family members. A white rail fence surrounds the cemetery. The current Point Lookout was created after a 1927 flood destroyed the previous cemetery, located between the current Camps C and D. In September 2001, a memorial was installed here dedicated to "Unknown Prisoners". The Point Lookout plot established after 1927 has 331 grave markers and an unknown number of bodies; it is considered full.

Point Lookout II, a cemetery annex 100 yards (90 meters) east of the original Point Lookout, opened in the mid-1990s; it has a capacity of 700 grave sites. As of 2010, 90 inmates were buried at Point Lookout II.

=== Angola Museum ===
The Angola Museum, operated by the nonprofit Louisiana State Penitentiary Museum Foundation, is the on-site prison museum. Visitors are charged a $5 per adult admission fee and $3 per adult if the group is ten or larger. The museum is located outside the prison's main gate, in a former bank building.

=== Angola Airstrip ===
The prison includes the Angola Airstrip (FAA LID: LA67). The airstrip is used by state-owned aircraft to transport prisoners to and from Angola and for transporting officials on state business to and from Angola. The airport is used during daylight and visual flight rules times.

=== Other correctional facilities and features ===
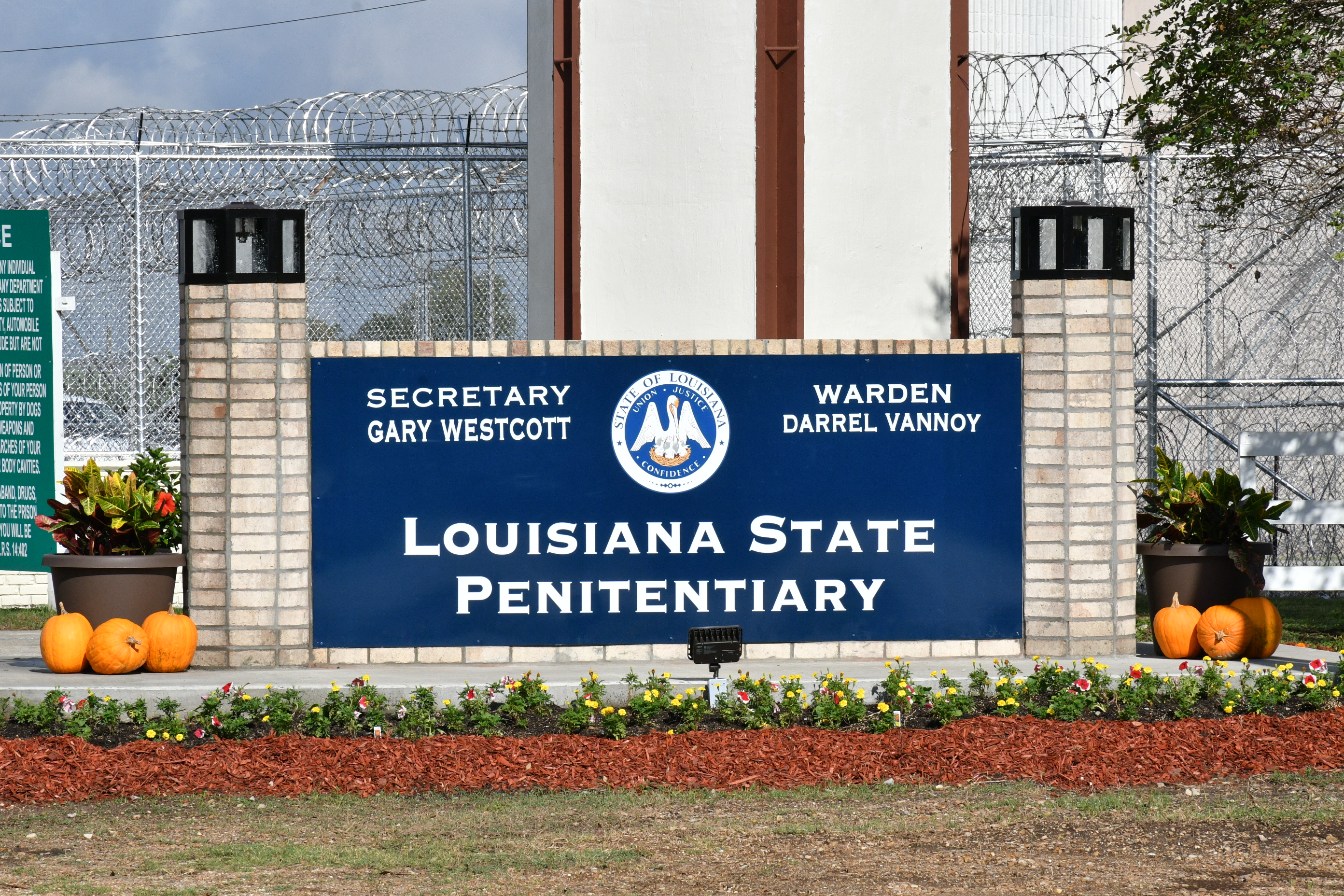
The entrance sign to Louisiana State Penitentiary states "Louisiana State Penitentiary" Secretary Gary Westcott and Warden Darrel Vannoy along with the State of Louisiana seal.

The facility's main entrance has a metal-roofed guard house to review traffic to and from the prison. Michael L. Varnado and Daniel P. Smith of Victims of Dead Man Walking stated that the guard house "looks like a large carport over the road". The guard house has long barriers, with Stop signs, to prevent automobiles entering and leaving the compound without the permission of the officers. The officers manually raise the barriers to allow a vehicle access or egress.

The Front Gate Visiting Processing Center, with a rated capacity of 272 persons, is the processing and security screening point for prison visitors. The United States Postal Service operates the Angola Post Office on the prison grounds. It was established on October 2, 1887.

The David C. Knapps Correctional Officer Training Academy, the state training center for correctional officers, is located at the northwest corner of Angola, in front of Camp F. Near the training center, Angola prisoners maintain the only nature preserve located on the grounds of a penal institution. The R. E. Barrow, Jr. Treatment Center is located on the Angola premises.

The C.C. Dixon K-9 Training Center is the dog-training area. It was named in 2002 to commemorate Connie Conrad Dixon, a dog trainer, and K-9 officer, who died in 1997 aged 89.

The Louisiana State Penitentiary Wastewater Treatment Plant serves the prison complex. The prison also houses an all-purpose arena.

=== History of infrastructure at the correctional facility ===
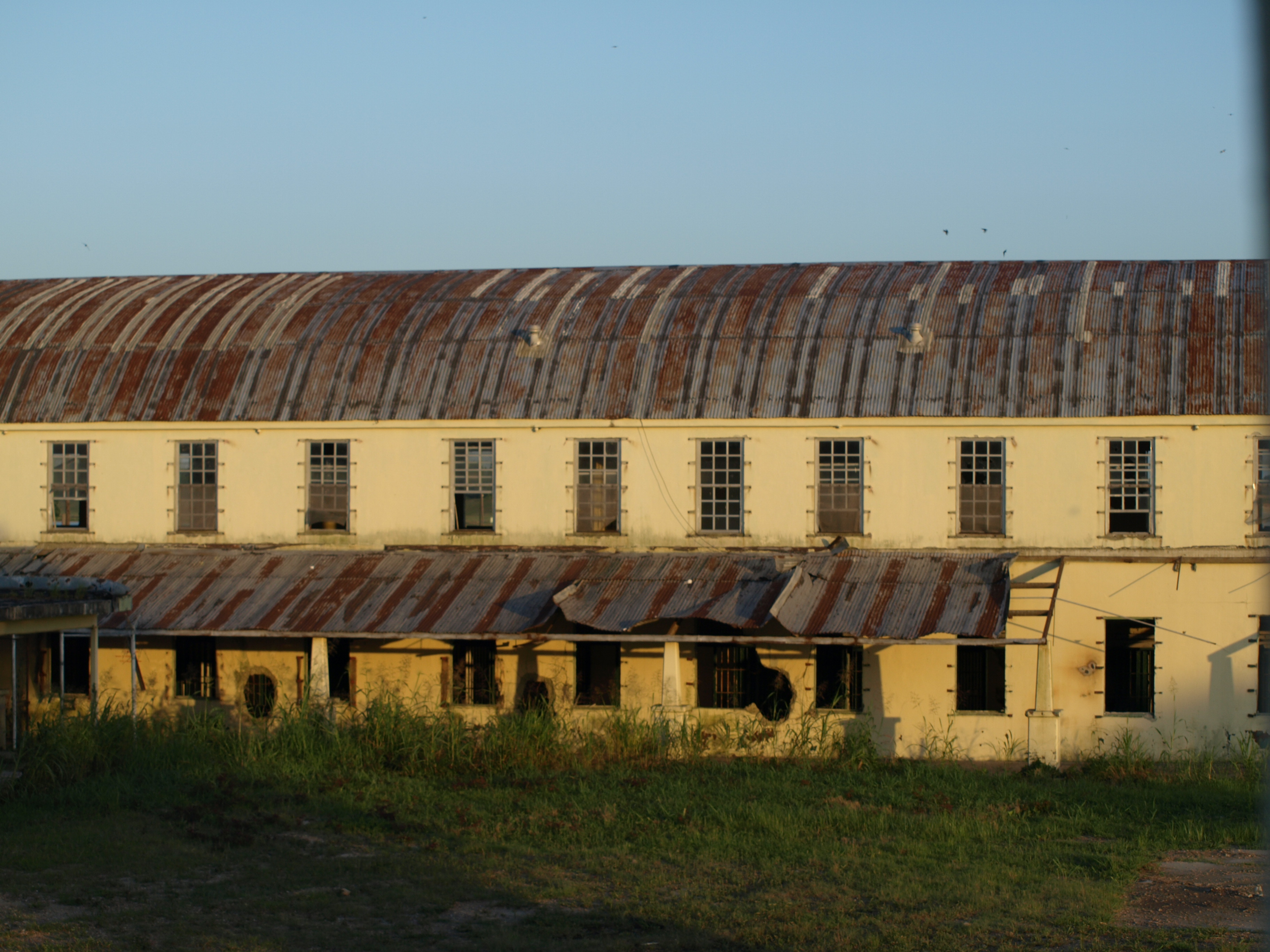
Camp H, a prisoner housing facility that is no longer in service

Camp A, the former slave quarters for the plantation, was the first building to house inmates. In the early 21st century, Camp A did not house prisoners.

Charles Wolfe and Kip Lornell, authors of The Life and Legend of Leadbelly (1992), stated that during the 1930s, Angola was "even further removed from decent civilization" than it was in the 1990s. The two added, "That's the way the state of Louisiana wanted it, for Angola held some of the meanest inmates."

In 1930, about 130 women, most of them black, were imprisoned in Camp D. In 1930, Camp A, which held around 700 black inmates, was close to the center of the Angola institution. Inmates worked on levee control as the springtime high water threatened Angola. The Mississippi River was nearly 1 mile (1.6 km) wide in this area. Many inmates who tried to swim across drowned; few of their bodies were recovered.

The prison hospital opened in the 1940s. The campus had only one permanent nurse and no permanent doctor.

In the 1980s, the main road to Angola had not been paved. It has since been blacktopped.

The outcamp buildings, constructed in 1939 as a WPA project during the Great Depression, were renovated in the 1970s. In May 1993, the buildings' fire safety violations were reported. In June of that year, Richard Stalder, the Secretary of Corrections, said that Angola would close the buildings if LDP S&C did not find millions of dollars to improve the buildings.

==== Red Hat Cell Block ====
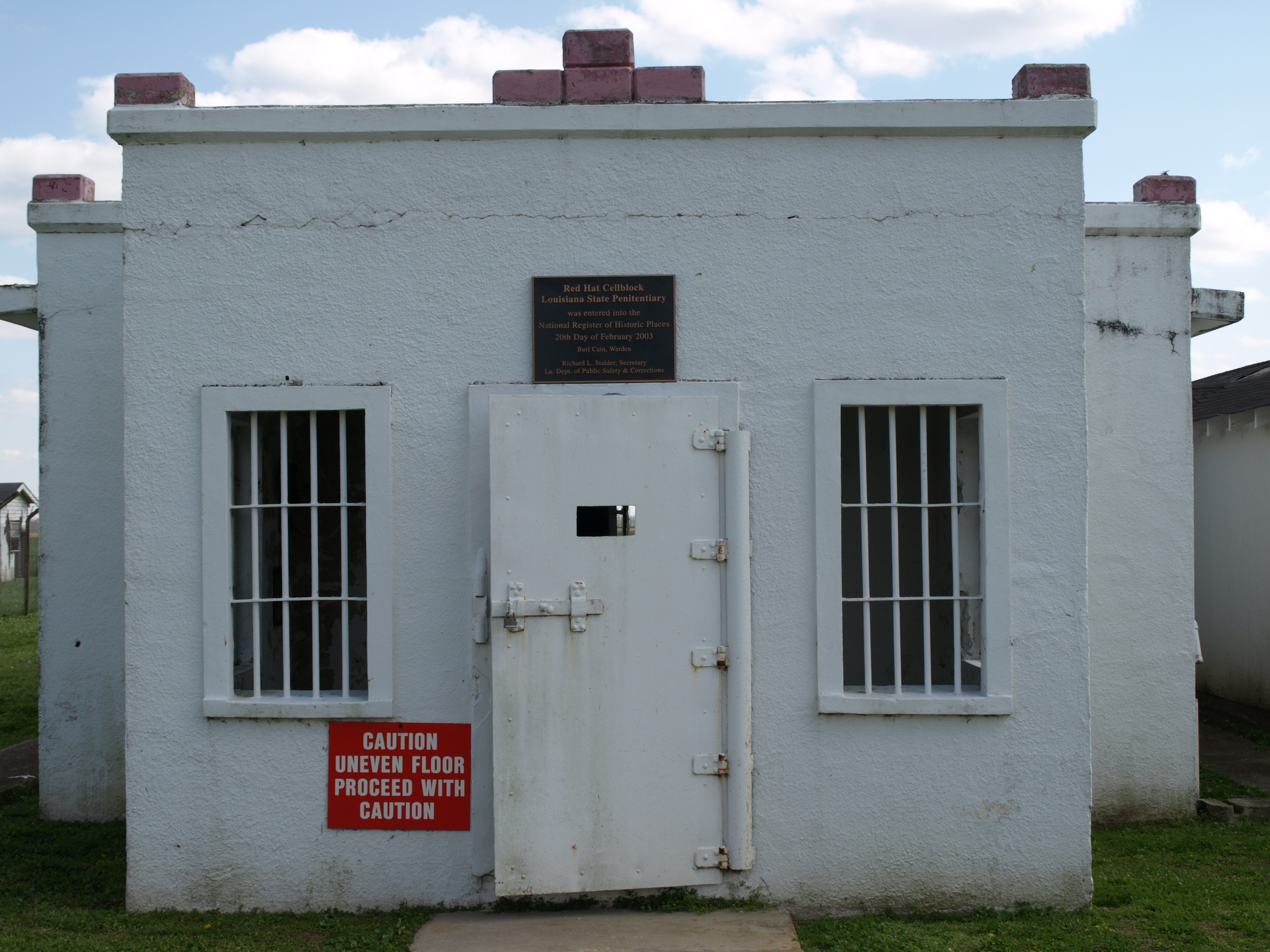
Red Hat Cell Block

The most restrictive inmate housing unit was colloquially referred to as "Red Hat Cell Block", after the red paint-coated straw hats that its occupants wore when they worked in the fields. "Red Hat", a one-story, 30-cell building at Camp E, was built in 1933. Brooke Shelby Biggs of Mother Jones reported that men who had lived in "Red Hat" "told of a dungeon crawling with rats, where dinner was served in stinking buckets splashed onto the floors."

Warden C. Murray Henderson phased out solitary confinement at "Red Hat". In 1972, his successor Elayn Hunt had "Red Hat" officially closed.

In 1977, the administration made Camp J the most restrictive housing unit in Angola. On February 20, 2003, the National Park Service listed the Red Hat Cell Block on the National Register of Historic Places as #03000041.

== Demographics ==
Louisiana State Penitentiary is the largest correctional facility in the United States by population. In 2010, the prison had 5,100 inmates and 1,700 employees. In 2010, the racial composition of the inmates was 76% black and 24% white. 71% of inmates were serving a life sentence. 1.6% had been sentenced to death. As of 2016 many inmates come from the state of Mississippi.

As of 2011, the prison has about 1,600 employees, making it one of the largest employers in Louisiana. Over 600 "free people" live on prison property. These residents are LSP's emergency response personnel and their dependents. In 1986, around 200 families of employees lived within Angola property. Hilton Butler, then LSP's Warden, estimated that 250 children lived on the Angola property.

Many prison employees are from families that have lived and worked at the facility for generations. Laura Sullivan of National Public Radio said, "In a place so remote, it's hard to know what's nepotism. There's simply no one else to hire."

== Operations ==
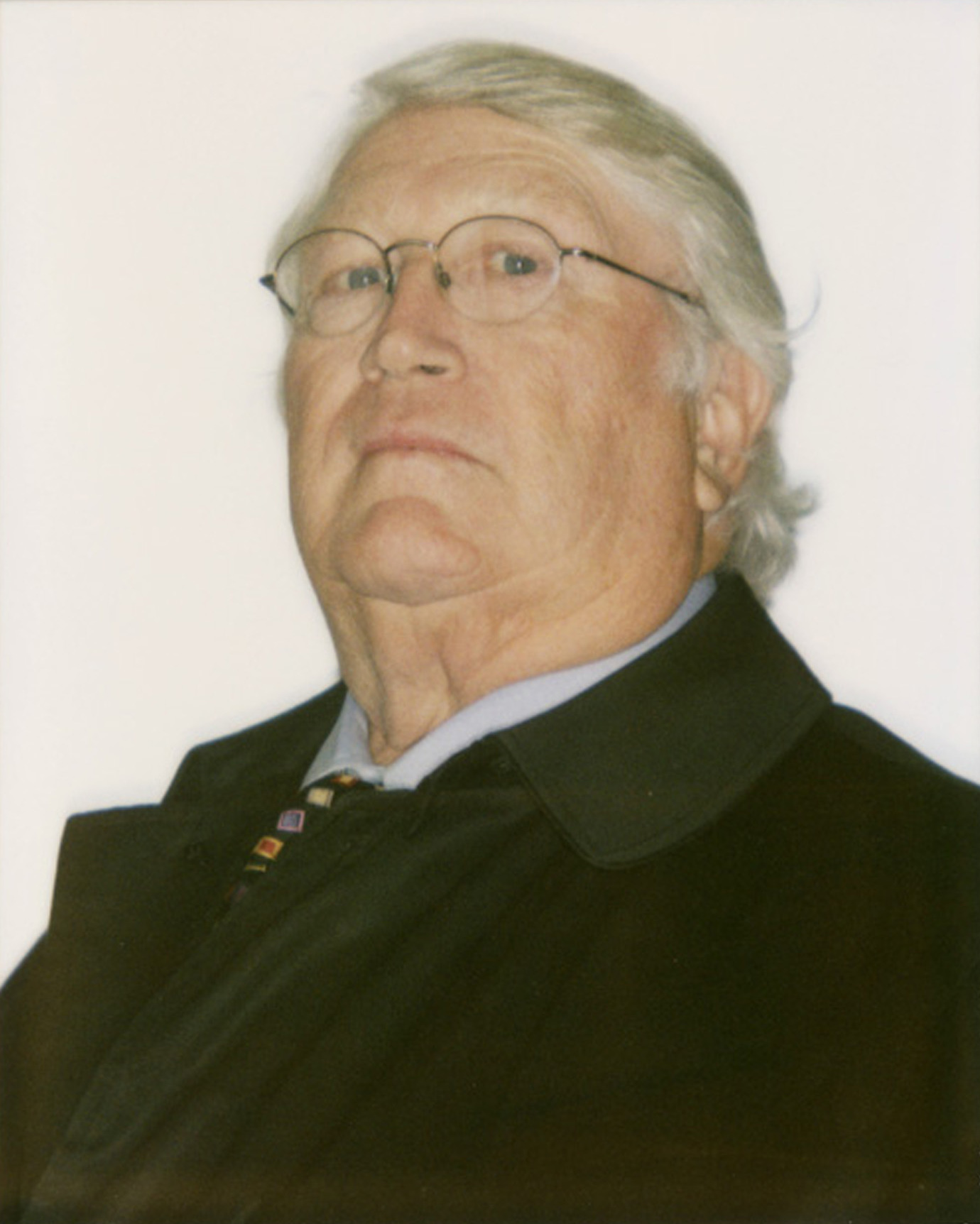
Burl Cain, warden of Angola from 1995 to 2016

As of 2011, the annual budget of the Louisiana State Penitentiary was more than $120 million. Angola still is operated as a working farm; former Warden Burl Cain once said that the key to running a peaceful maximum security prison was that "you've got to keep the inmates working all day so they're tired at night." In 2009 James Ridgeway of Mother Jones wrote Angola was "An 18,000-acre complex that still resembles the slave plantation it once was."

Angola has the largest number of inmates on life sentences in the United States. As of 2009, Angola had 3,712 inmates on life sentences, making up 74% of the population that year. Some 32 inmates die each year; only four generally gain parole each year. Louisiana's tough sentencing laws result in long sentences for the inmate population, who have been convicted of armed robbery, murder, and rape. In 1998, Peter Applebome of The New York Times wrote, "It's impossible to visit the place and not feel that a prisoner could disappear off the face of the earth and no one would ever know or care."

Most new prisoners begin working in the cotton fields. A prisoner may spend years working there before gaining a better job.

In Angola parlance, a "freeman" is a correctional officer. Around 2000, the officers were among the lowest-paid in the United States. Like the prisoners they supervised, few had graduated from high school. As of 2009, about half of the officers were female.

The administration uses prisoners to provide cleaning and general maintenance services for the West Feliciana Parish School Board and other government agencies and nonprofit groups within West Feliciana Parish.

Warden Burl Cain maintained an open-door policy with the media. He allowed the filming of the documentary The Farm: Angola, USA (1998) at the prison, which focused on the lives of six men. It won numerous awards. Films such as Dead Man Walking, Monster's Ball, and I Love You Phillip Morris were partly filmed in Angola. Cain did not allow a proposed sex scene between two male inmates in I Love You Phillip Morris to be filmed at the prison.

The prison hosts a rodeo every April and October. Inmates produce the newsmagazine The Angolite, which has won numerous awards. It is available to the general public and is relatively uncensored.

The museum features among its exhibits Louisiana's old electric chair, "Gruesome Gertie", last used for the execution of Andrew Lee Jones on July 22, 1991. Angola Prison hosts the country's only inmate-operated radio station, KLSP.

=== Farming ===
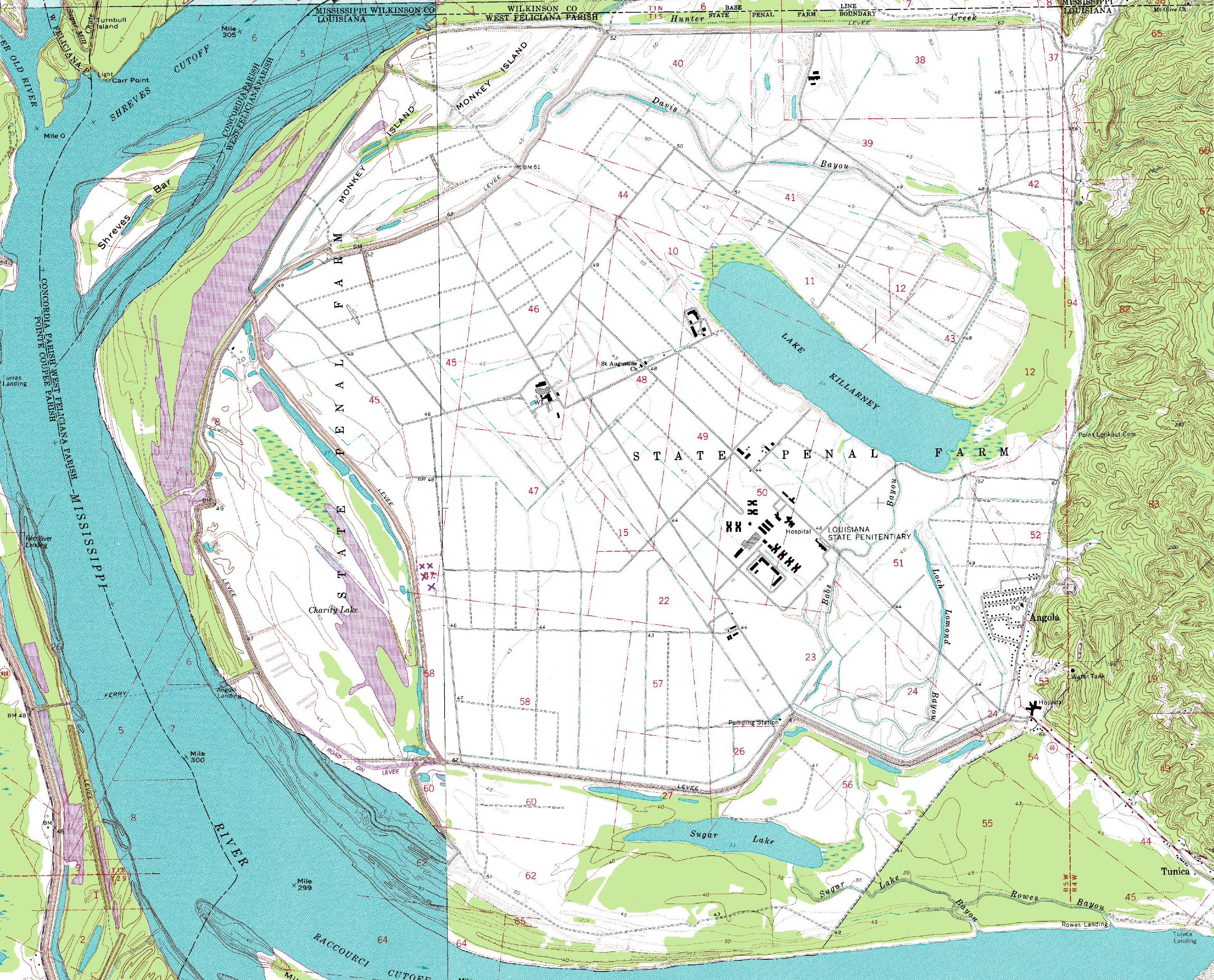
A topographical map, 1994, U.S. Geological Survey

Inmates cultivate, harvest, and process various crops that make the facility self-supporting. Crops include cabbage, corn, cotton, strawberries, okra, onions, peppers, soybeans, squash, tomatoes, and wheat. In 2013, the prison resumed growing sugarcane, a practice stopped in the 1970s.

As of 2010, the prison had 2,000 head of cattle. Much of the herd is sold at markets for beef. Each year, the prison produces four million pounds of vegetable crops.

=== Inmate education ===
Angola offers literacy classes for prisoners with no high school diploma and no General Equivalency Diploma (GED) from Monday through Friday in the main prison and camps C-D and F. Angola also offers GED classes in the main prison and camps C-D and F. The prison also offers ABE (Adult Basic Education) classes for prisoners who have high school diplomas or GEDs but who have inadequate Test of Adult Basic Education (TABE) scores to get into vocational school. SSD (Special School District #1) provides services for special education students.

Prisoners with satisfactory TABE scores may be admitted to vocational classes. Such classes include automotive technology, carpentry, culinary arts, graphic communications, horticulture, and welding. In 1995, a campus of the New Orleans Baptist Theological Seminary was established in the penitentiary following an invitation from the prison warden, Burl Cain. The school has significantly reduced the rate of violence in the prison.

In 1994, the United States Congress voted to eliminate prisoner eligibility for Pell Grants, making religious programs such as the New Orleans Baptist program the only ones in higher education available to prisoners. As of Spring 2008, 95 prisoners were students in the program. Angola also offers the PREP Pre-Release Exit and Re-Entry Programs for prisoners about to be released into the outside world.

Inmate library services are provided by the main Prison Library and four outcamp libraries. The prison is part of the Inter-Library Loan Program with the State Library of Louisiana.

=== Manufacturing ===
Angola has several manufacturing facilities. The Farm Warehouse (914) is the point of distribution of agricultural supplies. The Mattress/Broom/Mop shop makes mattresses and cleaning tools. The Printing Shop prints documents, forms, and other printed materials. The Range Herd group manages 1,600 head of cattle. The Row Crops group harvests crops. The Silk-Screen group produces plates, badges, road and highway signs, and textiles; it also manages sales of sign hardware. The Tag Plant produces license plates for Louisiana and overseas customers. The Tractor Repair shop repairs agricultural equipment. The Transportation Division delivers goods manufactured by the Prison Enterprises Division.

=== Magazine ===
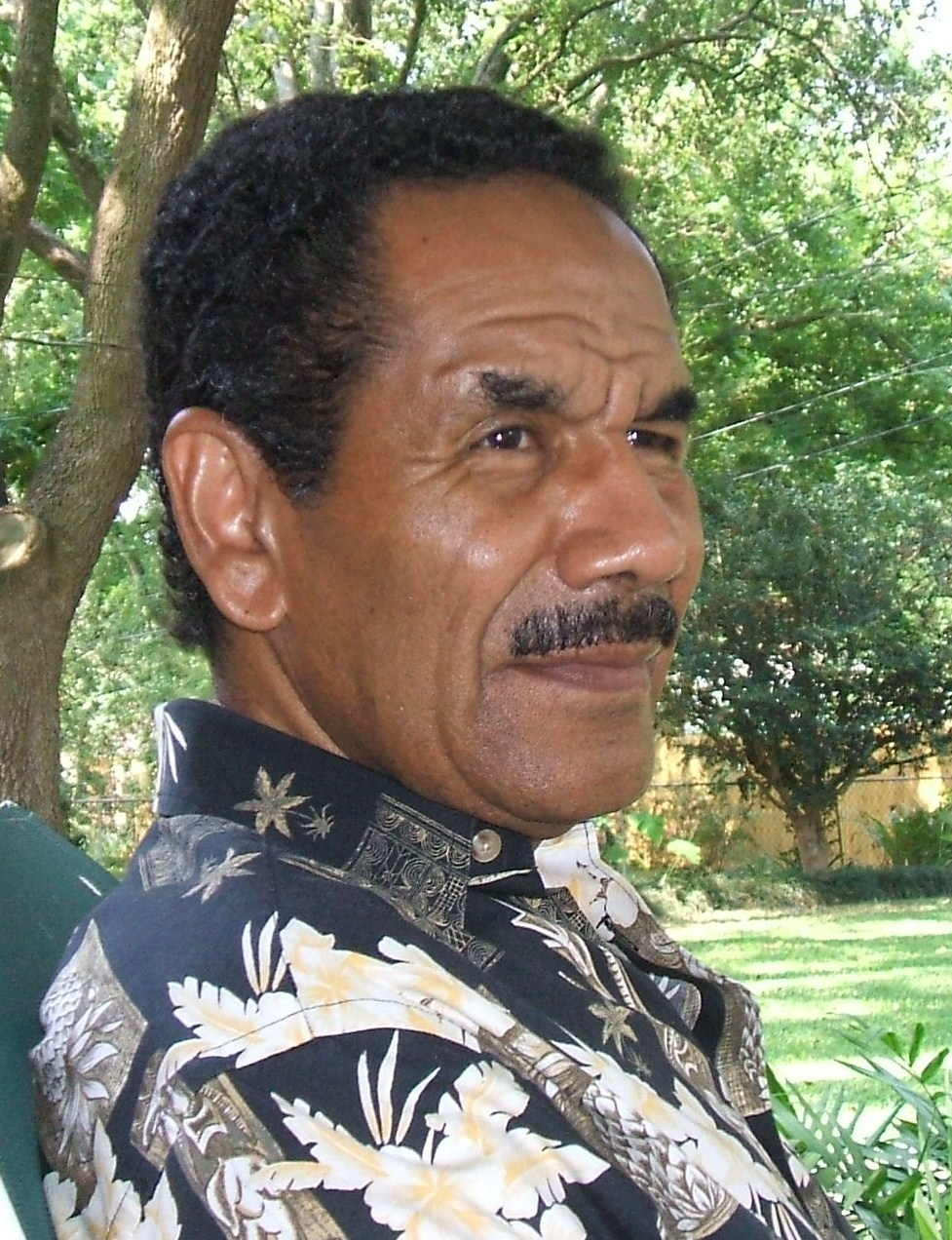
Wilbert Rideau was an editor of The Angolite, 1975 to 2002

The Angolite is the institution's inmate-published and edited magazine, which began in 1975 or 1976. Each year, six issues are published. Louisiana prison officials believed an independently edited publication would help the prison. The Angolite gained a national reputation as a quality magazine and won international awards under two prisoner editors, Wilbert Rideau and Billy Sinclair, who became co-editors in 1978.

=== Radio ===
Angola is the only penitentiary in the U.S. to be issued an FCC radio station license. KLSP (Louisiana State Penitentiary) is a 100-watt radio station that operates at 91.7 on the FM dial from inside the prison to approximately 6,000 potential listeners including inmates and penitentiary staff. Inmates operate the station and carry some satellite programming. Inside the walls of Angola, KLSP is called the "Incarceration Station". The station airs a variety of programming including gospel, jazz, blues, rock-n-roll, country, and oldies music, as well as educational and religious programs. The station has 20 hours of daily airtime, and all of the music aired by the station is donated. Music from His Radio and the Moody Ministry Broadcasting Network (MBN) airs during several hours of the day. Prisoners make the majority of broadcasting decisions.

A radio station was established in 1986 originally as a means of communication within the complex. Jenny Lee Rice of Paste wrote, "the need to disseminate information rapidly is critical" because Angola is the largest prison in the United States. The non-emergency uses of the station began in 1987 when Jimmy Swaggart, an evangelist, gave the prison old equipment from his radio network. In the early years, the radio station emphasized announcements and music more than religion, but it broadcast more religious programming in the early 21st century.

In 2001, Christian music artist Larry Howard of Chuck Colson's Prison Fellowship visited the prison. He encouraged Jim Campbell, the President of Radio Training Network, to rebuild the station, which was off the air due to antiquated and broken equipment. His Radio Network Manager, Ken Mayfield, led a team that helped rebuild the station. It included Ted McCall (HIS Radio Chief Engineer), Jerry Williams (The Joy FM), Ben Birdsong (The Wind FM), Steve Swanson (WAFJ), and Rob Dempsey (HIS Radio). The team conducted an on-air radio fundraiser to buy new radio equipment. The fundraiser exceeded its $80,000 goal, raising more than $124,000 within three hours. Warden Burl Cain used the funds to update the radio equipment. Ken Mayfield returned several times to Angola to train prisoner DJs in using the new electronic systems. New equipment, including a new transmitter, allowed KLSP to broadcast in stereo for the first time, utilize satellite to expand its daily airtime to 20 hours, and upgrade its programming. As of 2012, KLSP had an output of 105 watts. Further than 7 miles (11 km) away from Angola on Louisiana Highway 61, the signal begins to fade. At 10 miles (16 km), listeners can hear only white noise. Paul von Zielbauer of The New York Times wrote that "Still, 100 watts does not push the station's signal far beyond the prison gate." All 24 hours are devoted to religious programming. After religion became the primary focus, some inmates stopped listening to the station.

=== Television ===
The prison officials have started LSP-TV, a television station. According to Kalen Mary Ann Churcher of Pennsylvania State University, the television station follows the religious programming emphasis of the radio station more closely than it emulates reporting of The Angolite. But its prisoner staff and technicians also films prisoner events, such as the Angola Prison Rodeo, prize fights, and football games. As it has a closed circuit system, it allows even inmates on death row to watch the broadcasts.

=== Burial of the deceased ===
Coffins for deceased prisoners are manufactured by inmates on the prison grounds. Previously, deceased prisoners were buried in cardboard boxes. After one body fell through the bottom of a box, Warden Burl Cain changed a policy, allowing for the manufacture of proper coffins for the deceased. In April 2006, Franklin Graham, son of evangelist Billy Graham, held a large meeting in the arena at Angola Prison. While there, he visited the woodworking shop where inmates built the caskets. Graham ordered two - one for each of his parents. Graham's casket was placed in the Capitol Rotunda, where he lay in honor on February 28, 2018.

=== Death row ===
In 1972, in the US Supreme Court decision in Furman v. Georgia, the court found the application of the death penalty so arbitrary under existing state laws that it was unconstitutional. It suspended executions for all persons on death row in the United States (slightly more than 600, overwhelmingly male) under current state laws. It ordered state courts to judicially amend their sentences to the next lower level of severity, generally life in prison. Louisiana passed a new death penalty statute, which was overturned by the state supreme court in 1977 for its application to convictions for rape. The death penalty statute was amended again, effective September 1977. Louisiana did not execute any prisoners until 1983.

According to Louisiana Department of Corrections policy, inmates on death row are held in solitary confinement during the entire time they are incarcerated, even if appeals take years. This means that they are severely isolated and confined to their windowless cells for 23 hours per day. For one hour per day an inmate may shower and/or move up and down the halls under escort. An inmate is permitted to use the exercise yard thrice a week. Death row inmates can have several books at a time, and each inmate may have one five-minute personal telephone call per month. They may not participate in education or work programs. Death row inmates receive unlimited visitor access. Officers patrol the death row corridors nightly as a suicide prevention tactic.

Nick Trenticosta, a New Orleans attorney with the ACLU who is involved with prison issues, has said that warden Burl Cain treated death row inmates in a more favorable manner than did wardens of other death row prisons in the United States. Trenticosta said, "It is not that these guys had super privileges. But Warden Cain was somewhat responsive to not only prisoners but to their families."

In March 2017, three death row inmates at Angola filed a federal class-action suit against the prison and LDOC over its solitary confinement policy, charging that it constituted "cruel and unusual punishment" under the 8th Amendment to the US Constitution. Each of the men had been held in solitary for more than 25 years. The lawsuit describes basic conditions on death row:

- sparse cells, hot in summer, with little natural light
- lack of recreation
- no hobbies
- very little religion

This lawsuit was settled in October 2021, requiring that inmates on death row are granted a minimum of four hours out of their cells to congregate with other incarcerated people in their tier each day, at least five hours of communal outdoor recreation each week, the ability to worship together, evening time out of their cells on their tier, at least one meal with other prisoners per day, group classes and contact visitations.

=== Execution ===
Male death row inmates are moved from the Reception Center to a cell near the execution chamber in Camp F on the day of the execution. The only person informed of when a prisoner will be transferred is the Warden; this is for security reasons and to not disrupt the prison routine. On a scheduled execution date, an execution can occur between 6 p.m. and midnight. Michael L. Varnado and Daniel P. Smith of Victims of Dead Man Walking stated that, on many occasions, the rest of Angola is not aware of the execution being carried out. In 2003, Assistant Warden of the Reception Center Lee said that once death row inmates learn of the execution, they "get a little quieter" and "[i]t suddenly becomes more real to them."

When the State of Louisiana used electrocution as its method of capital punishment, it formally referred to the anonymous executioner as "The Electrician". When the State of Louisiana referred to the executioner by name, he was called "Sam Jones", after Sam H. Jones, the Governor of Louisiana in power when electrocution was introduced as the capital punishment.

== Inmate life ==
=== Musical culture ===
As of 2011, several Angola inmates practiced musical skills. The prison administration encourages prisoners to practice music and uses music to reward inmates who behave.

In the 1930s John Lomax, a folklorist, and Alan Lomax, his son, traveled throughout the U.S. South to document African-American musical culture. Since prison farms, including Angola, were isolated from general society, the Lomaxes believed that prisons had the purest African-American song culture, as popular trends did not influence it. The Lomaxes recorded several songs, which were plantation-era songs that originated during the slavery era. The Lomaxes met Lead Belly, a famous musician, in Angola. Swamp blues musician Lightnin' Slim also served time in Angola for manslaughter in the 1930s and early 1940s.

From 1968 to 1970, WAFB-TV in Baton Rouge aired a weekly early-morning program, Good Morning, Angola Style featuring bands made up of Angola inmates. The show was hosted by Buckskin Bill Black, who developed the idea for the program after meeting one of the prison's country music bands, The Westernaires, after performing at the 1967 Angola Prison Rodeo.

=== Sexual slavery ===
A 2010 memoir by Wilbert Rideau, an inmate at Angola from 1961 through 2005, states that "slavery was commonplace in Angola with perhaps a quarter of the population in bondage" throughout the 1960s and early 1970s. The New York Times states that weak inmates served as sex slaves who were raped, gang-raped, and traded and sold like cattle. Rideau stated, "The slave's only way out was to commit suicide, escape or kill his master." Herman Wallace and Albert Woodfox, members of the Angola 3, arrived at Angola in the late 1960s. They became active members of the prison's chapter of the Black Panther Party, where they organized petitions and hunger strikes to protest conditions at the prison and helped new inmates protect themselves from rape and enslavement. C. Murray Henderson, one of the wardens brought in to clean up the prison, states in one of his memoirs that the systemic sexual slavery was sanctioned and facilitated by the officers.

=== Inmate mental health ===
==== Mental health and faith at Angola ====
Louisiana State Penitentiary has been known for its non-traditional mental health interventions. One such initiative is a faith-based prototype program for mental healthcare and inmate rehabilitation known as the Angola Prison Seminary. This model focuses on introducing inmates to faith and helping them to find value and purpose through it – be that internally or externally through serving as an Inmate Minister. Through this position, inmates are trained to offer counseling to other inmates, deliver sermons at religious services, officiate funerals for fellow prisoners, and deliver care packages to ill inmates. This model proved to be particularly effective in Louisiana State Penitentiary, especially with its "sidewalk counseling" component. In this type of guidance, the counseling inmate asks leading questions and helps to guide the other inmate to answering their own question, without revealing any positionality. This model positively impacted both the counselor and the advisee, as the counselor felt an increased sense of self-worth by helping someone else, and the advisee felt heard and seen, maybe for the first time in his life. The New York Times reported that this program can help inmates feel "at peace with themselves and their lives". Reports noted that the Bible College behind bars made the prison feel significantly more relaxed than it truly was.

Faith is referenced many times as being a catalyst for positive change in the lives of lots of Louisiana State Penitentiary inmates. Author Mark Baker describes this connection in his book entitled You Can Change: Stories from Angola Prison and the Psychology of Personal Transformation. Here, Baker discusses how the high rates of reincarceration among Louisiana State Penitentiary inmates serves as an extremely demoralizing and discouraging reminder of the historical and systemic factors that landed them behind bars in the first place. Given the highly religious background of many of the inmates, who come largely from Louisiana, Mississippi, and other southern states, faith has proven to be a powerful motivator for many of the inmates in Angola. Baker discusses how inmates exposed to religious practices while incarcerated often went on to find a higher purpose in themselves and better avoid future reincarceration.

This faith-based approach to mental healthcare is also seen in palliative care at the Louisiana State Penitentiary. Due to the predominantly older population of inmates at Louisiana State Penitentiary, the prison sees much higher rates of intake than releases, as many men pass away while incarcerated. In partnership with the University Hospital Community Hospice program based out of New Orleans, the Louisiana State Penitentiary has introduced a hospice program for terminally ill inmates. Inmate Ministers can assist in counseling with the ill inmates, as well as help them practice faith if they are interested in doing so. As seen with the other responsibilities they were assigned, this serious duty proved beneficial to not only the recipients but the Inmate Ministers as well.

Though the blend of mental healthcare and faith interventions has been controversial and yielded mixed results in many spaces, research like Baker's suggests it works positively in Louisiana State Penitentiary. However, it is unclear why the large role of religion, particularly Christianity, in the Southern United States could be a major factor in this occurrence.

==== Violations of inmate rights ====
In 2021, a federal judge found that the Louisiana State Penitentiary violated the Americans with Disabilities Act in treating inmates requiring rehabilitative services. The judge, Chief U.S. District Judge Shelly Dick, ultimately ruled that the Louisiana State Penitentiary had committed a violation of the Americans with Disabilities Act and concluded her opinion by describing fifteen areas in which the prison required injunctive relief.

=== Inmate organizations ===
Inmate organizations include Angola Men of Integrity, the Lifers Organization, the Angola Drama Club, the Wonders of Joy, the Camp C Concept Club, and the Latin American Cultural Brotherhood. Angola is also the only penitentiary in the United States where inmates are allowed to independently run their own churches, a practice founded in the penitentiary's history with slavery and one looked upon favorably by inmates.

=== Angola Rodeo ===
On one weekend in April and every Sunday in October, Angola holds the Angola Prison Rodeo. On each occasion, thousands of visitors enter the prison complex. Initiated with planning in 1964, the rodeo held its first events in 1965. Initially, it was held for prisoner recreation but attracted increasing crowds.

The prison charges admission. Due to the rodeo's popularity, Angola built a 10,000-person stadium to support visitors; it opened in 2000. As part of the prison rodeo, the prison holds a semiannual Arts and Crafts Festival.

=== Programs for fathers ===
Angola has two programs for fathers who are incarcerated at Angola. Returning Hearts is an event where prisoners may spend up to eight hours with their children in a Carnival-like celebration. Returning began in 2005; by 2010, 2,500 prisoners had participated in the program. Malachi Dads is a year-long program that uses the Christian Bible to teach how to improve a prisoner's parenting skills. Malachi began in 2007; as of 2010, 119 men participated.

== Notable inmates ==
=== Executed prisoners ===
- Gerald James Bordelon, executed in 2010 (most recent execution via lethal injection in Louisiana)
- John A. Brown, Jr., executed in 1997
- Jimmy L. Glass, executed in 1987
- Jessie Hoffman Jr., executed on March 18, 2025 (first person executed by nitrogen hypoxia in Louisiana).
- Antonio G. James, executed in 1996
- Andrew Lee Jones, executed in 1991 (most recent execution via electric chair in Louisiana)
- Leslie Lowenfield, executed in 1988
- David Dene Martin, executed in 1985
- Leslie Dale Martin, executed in 2002
- Dalton Prejean, executed in 1990
- Robert Wayne Sawyer, executed in 1993 (first execution via lethal injection in Louisiana)
- Elmo Patrick Sonnier, executed in 1984
- Feltus Taylor, Jr., executed in 2000
- Thomas Lee Ward, executed in 1995
- Dobie Gillis Williams, executed in 1999
- Robert Wayne Williams, executed in 1983 (first execution since 1976 in Louisiana)
- Robert Lee Willie, executed in 1984
- Jimmy C. Wingo, executed in 1987

=== Death row prisoners ===
- Anthony Bell, convicted of the 2006 Baton Rouge church shooting
- Daniel Blank, death row inmate and convicted serial killer
- Nathaniel Code, death row inmate and convicted serial killer
- Kyle David Joekel, one of the two men who killed two police officers during a mass shooting.
- Derrick Todd Lee, serial killer. Died of heart disease before execution could be carried out.
- Larry Roy, nicknamed the" Cheneyville Slasher", who was convicted and sent to death row for a 1993 double murder.
- Christopher Sepulvado, convicted child killer and death row inmate. Died less than a month before his scheduled execution on February 22, 2025.
- Todd Wessinger, death row inmate and convicted double murderer
- Jeffrey Clark and David Brown, two members of the Angola 5 who were sentenced to death for the murder of David Knapps

=== Other prisoners ===
- The Angola Three (Robert Hillary King, Herman Wallace, and Albert Woodfox), spent decades in solitary confinement
- Clementine Barnabet, alleged voodoo priestess and convicted axe murderer
- James Booker, New Orleans R&B artist
- Boosie Badazz (Torence Ivy Hatch Jr., formerly Lil' Boosie), rapper
- Derrick Groves, Orleans Parish Prison escapee
- Antoine Massey, Orleans Parish Prison escapee
- C-Murder (Corey Miller), rapper
- David Mathis, Barry Edge and Robert Carley, three members of the Angola 5 who were sentenced to life imprisonment for the murder of David Knapps
- Ronald Dominique, serial killer
- Clifford Etienne, professional boxer
- Jack Favor, rodeo performer
- Sean Vincent Gillis, serial killer
- Warren Harris, serial killer
- Will Hayden, reality TV host
- Patrick O'Neal Kennedy, defendant in Kennedy v. Louisiana
- Lead Belly (Huddie William Ledbetter), folk and blues musician
- Carlos Marcello, New Orleans Mafia boss
- Eric Matthews, serial killer and rapist
- H. Lane Mitchell, Shreveport public works commissioner from 1934 to 1968
- Henry Montgomery, defendant in Montgomery v. Louisiana
- Kirksey Nix, boss of the Dixie Mafia
- Marlowe Parker, artist
- Wilbert Rideau, editor of The Angolite, winner of the George Polk Award
- Vincent Simmons, documentary subject
- Jon B. Simonis, serial rapist
- Billy Sinclair, editor of The Angolite, winner of the George Polk Award
- James Monroe Smith, former Louisiana State University president
- Gary Tyler, former death row inmate, later released after his conviction was downgraded to manslaughter
- Robert Pete Williams, blues musician

== Notable employees ==
- Burl Cain, warden from 1995 to 2015
- Billy Cannon, Heisman Trophy-winning running back at LSU in 1959, former prison dentist
- George Gray, pro wrestler (One Man Gang), former prison guard
- James Monroe Smith, former Louisiana State University president, head of rehabilitation programs, 1948–49
- John Whitley, warden from 1990 to 1995

== In popular culture ==
- Dead Man Walking, a book about the prison by Helen Prejean

== See also ==
- List of law enforcement agencies in Louisiana
- List of United States state correction agencies
- Ellen Bryan Moore
