= Marlowe Parker =

American artist

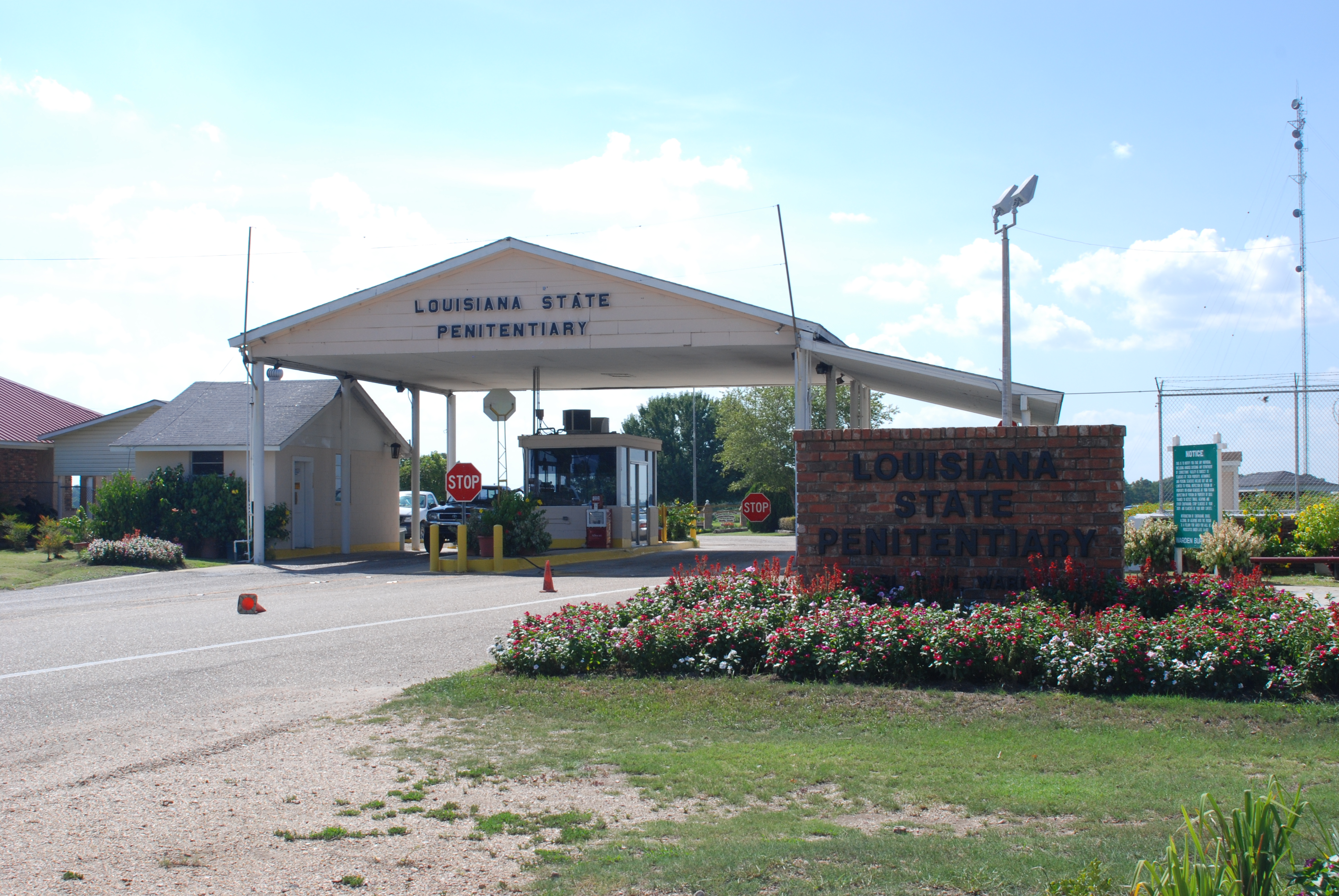
Louisiana State Penitentiary, where Parker is imprisoned

Marlowe Parker is an artist who was an inmate at the Louisiana State Penitentiary (Angola) in West Feliciana Parish, Louisiana. Parker exhibited and sold his artwork during the Angola Rodeo art shows. Burl Cain, the warden of Angola, said in 2012 that Parker is "probably one of our best artists." Harry Connick Jr. is one of Parker's fans. Parker named Clementine Hunter and his stepfather, an artist and former Angola prisoner named Gilbert Green, as his influences. Parker is incarcerated due to a 25-year drug-related sentence. Parker had family members living in New Orleans.

== Paintings ==
Parker's works include scenes of everyday life, his own fictional characters, and images of plantation life. Several of Parker's works, including those in urban and rural settings, feature "moose heads," caricatures of people with long necks and large heads. Rebecca Todd Pitre of the Baton Rouge-based 225 wrote that "At the Angola Prison Rodeo, Parker’s fictional characters draw the biggest crowds."

In 2005, as Hurricane Katrina hit New Orleans, Parker, then incarcerated in Angola, made paintings using the scenes on television as his inspiration. On Sunday October 7, 2012, an individual stole one of Parker's paintings during the Angola Rodeo. The stolen work, a 16 inches (410 mm) by 12 inches (300 mm) oil painting, depicted the Magnolia Mound Plantation. The work's original price was $1,500. Cain said that the painting was "probably" worth $500 or more and that he was not surprised Parker was targeted. It was one of three paintings that Parker was exhibiting and it had won second place in the arts and crafts show.
