= Eric Matthews (serial killer) =

Convicted American serial killer

- Born: Eric Matthews; May 3, 1974 (age 52); Indianapolis, Indiana, U.S.
- Conviction: Second degree murder (2 counts)
- Penalty: Life imprisonment without parole

Details
- Victims: 4
- Span of crimes: 1994–1998
- Country: United States
- States: Indiana, Louisiana
- Date apprehended: May 20, 1998
- Imprisoned at: Louisiana State Penitentiary

Eric Matthews (born May 3, 1974) is an American serial killer and rapist who killed two of his ex-girlfriends in Indiana in 1994, followed by his wife and stepson in Louisiana in 1998. Additionally linked to two rapes while on the run, he was arrested and put on trial after years of delay, where he was found guilty and sentenced to life imprisonment.

== Early life ==
Little is known about Matthews' upbringing. Born in Indianapolis on May 3, 1974, his troubles began as early as age 3, when one of his uncles began molesting him. In the ensuing years, he constantly got in trouble with police due to small-time crimes, but could not be prosecuted due to his young age. In an attempt to help him, he was first sent to a mental hospital at age 9, and for a few years was shuffled between various institutions in Michigan, Chicago and Arizona. At age 10, he was convicted of raping a 35-year-old staff worker at one of the hospitals he was interned in. However, despite his violent record, Matthews was released and returned to Indianapolis, graduating from Lawrence Central High School. He was known as a charming, but very violent character, who nonetheless had no trouble maintaining relationships with women.

== Murders ==
In June 1994, Matthews was working at a pancake house in Castleton, together with a 19-year-old co-worker named Kenya L. Willis. Around this time, Willis vanished mysteriously, and has not been located to this very day. At the time, Matthews was not suspected, and the circumstances surrounding this case remained unclear until his arrest. Around the same time, Matthews' 18-year-old girlfriend, Christina Darnell, had moved in with him at his Indianapolis apartment to look after their 2-year-old daughter, Erica. However, Matthews began beating her on a regular basis, causing Darnell to send their daughter away to live at her parents' home in Madison, Alabama. Against her mother's wishes, she decided to stay with Matthews, keeping in contact with her mother and daughter by talking to them on the phone every day. On September 1, Darnell's mother, who had not heard from her in three days, finally reported her as missing. The authorities went to Matthews' household, and after interrogation, he admitted that the pair had been in a fight on August 29, but claimed that Darnell had taken $700 and simply left. At a later interview with The Indianapolis Star, he continued to proclaim his innocence and pointed to the fact that all leads for the case were essentially provided by him, since he was the one who filed the missing persons report. While Darnell's family members were highly suspicious of Matthews' involvement in the case, he could not be arrested at the time due to lack of evidence, coupled with the fact that the possibility that Darnell, who suffered from a dissociative identity disorder, could have been interned at a psychiatric institution for treatment. In spite of their efforts to locate her, her trail went cold.

Matthews remained in the area until 1996, when he moved to New Orleans, Louisiana. He stayed under the radar for most of this time, and sometime in 1997, he met 19-year-old Lashann Sylve, a divorced mother with two infant children. The couple married in November of that year, and then moved into a mobile home in Hammond. The couple seemingly got along well, but on May 18, 1998, some of Lashann's family members went to the home to visit her, only to find her dead body. Her hands and feet were bound with neckties and a sock had been stuffed in her mouth, with signs from choking around her neck. Alarmingly, neither Matthews nor the children were anywhere to be seen. In that time, he had kidnapped both 4-year-old Rosalyn and 17-month-old James, travelling between states to avoid arrest. Due to the parental kidnapping and crossing state lines, the FBI were called in to assist with Matthews' apprehension.

The day after his wife's murder, Matthews drove to Castleton, registering at a motel called "The Dollar Inn". While staying there, he called a 36-year-old stripper to come to his room and entertain him; after she danced for some time, however, Matthews attacked and raped her, before choking the woman into unconsciousness. When she came back to her senses, he had already fled. From there, he went past Tickfaw, Louisiana, where he abducted a teenage girl and drove her to the nearby fields to rape her. After doing so, he left her there to die from dehydration, but the girl was safely located before that could happen.

== Arrest, trial and imprisonment ==
On May 20, Matthews' black Dodge was spotted by officers in Schiller Park, Illinois, heading towards the O'Hare International Airport. He was promptly arrested and brought in for questioning, but shockingly, authorities only found Rosalyn in his car, with no sign of James. After initially refusing to tell where he was, Matthews told them that he had dropped James off at a hospital in New Orleans, since he had become ill while in the car. Finding his claims dubious, authorities resumed searching for the infant, only to find his body, which had been stuffed in a gym bag and then thrown in a trash bin behind a church in Kenner. After further pressure from the FBI agents, Matthews broke down and finally confessed that he had killed James in a fit of rage mere hours after he had killed his wife.

On the following day, Matthews, much to the investigators' shock, also admitted to killing Willis and Darnell in Indianapolis more than four years ago. He claimed that he had dumped Darnell's body in a trash bin somewhere, but was unable to recall exactly where, failing to provide authorities with accurate directions. Therefore, it was agreed that he should be tried on murder charges in Louisiana first, as the abundant physical evidence could possibly secure the death penalty for him. Matthews' attorneys attempted to prevent his confession, which they claimed had been obtained by coercion, and therefore argued that it should not be admitted in court, but the claim was rejected by the judge. However, the case would not be brought to trial for several more years, as Matthews' attorneys successfully managed to produce several legal maneuvers to delay it, including a competency hearing to determine whether their client was sane. In 2006, eight years after his initial arrest, Matthews was finally brought to trial. In a plea deal with the prosecutors, who promised not to seek the death penalty, he pled guilty to second-degree murder and proclaimed that he would not seek to appeal his sentence. As a result, Matthews was handed a life term without a chance of parole, which he is still serving to this day.

== See also ==
- List of serial killers in the United States
