= Jerry White (criminal) =

American murderer (1948–1995)

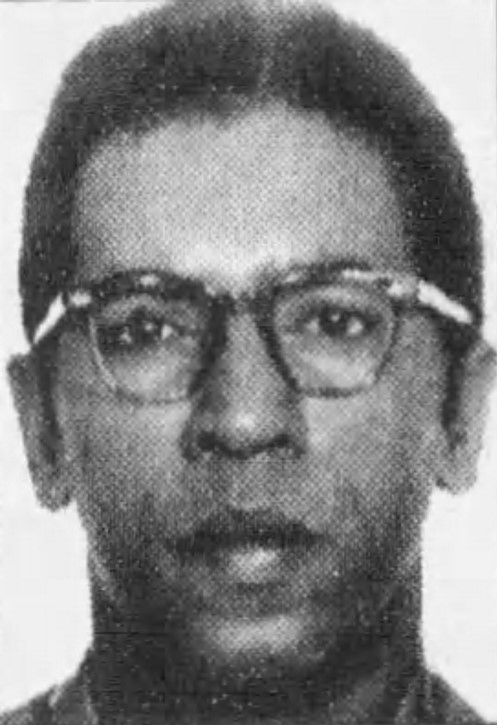
- Born: February 12, 1948; Quincy, Florida, U.S.
- Died: December 4, 1995 (aged 47); Bradford County, Florida, U.S. (Note: Executed at Florida State Prison)
- Status: Executed by electrocution
- Convictions: First degree murder Armed robbery
- Penalty: Death (May 4, 1982)

Details
- Victims: 2 (1 died years later from complications)
- Date: March 8, 1981

Jerry White (February 12, 1948 – December 4, 1995) was executed by electric chair by the state of Florida in 1995 for the murder of James Melson, a shopper in a grocery store that White robbed in Orange County in 1981. White's execution was noteworthy due to witnesses reporting that White had an unusual reaction to the electricity. Later two separate death row inmates, Phillip Atkins and Thomas Harrison Provenzano, attempted to use White's execution as evidence that Florida's electric chair was malfunctioning and subjected death row inmates to cruel and unusual punishment.

== Early life ==
Jerry White was born on February 12, 1948, in Quincy, Florida. White grew up in an environment of poverty and instability. He never met his biological father, and his stepfather, a sharecropper, was murdered when White was a child. White's mother, Mabel Pinkins, worked as a maid and was rarely home during White's childhood. When he was 14, he was arrested for the first time for burglary of a store in Orlando. He was sentenced to serve one year in a reform school in Marianna, Florida, where he reported being beaten. Following his release, White's mother noted that his personality suddenly changed and that he seemed "quiet and withdrawn for a long, long time." He began drinking alcohol when he was 15. White subsequently dropped out of school and developed an addiction to heroin.

Prior to the crime for which he was executed, White accumulated a long history of arrests for crimes including attempted murder, robbery, larceny, and burglary. In 1977, White was convicted of three counts of robbery and was sentenced to three years in prison. He was released from prison in March 1980, a year prior to the robbery of the Alexander Grocery Store. Overall, prior to 1981, White had accumulated nine felony convictions.

Also prior to the murder, White was engaged to marry a woman.

== Crime ==
At 11:30 a.m. March 8, 1981, Jerry White entered Alexander's Grocery Store in Taft, Florida, with the intent to rob the store. At the time, Alex Alexander, the store's 53-year-old owner, and James A. Melson, a 34-year-old customer, were the only people in the store. White led Alexander and Melson to a bathroom at the back of the store and then shot them both with a pistol. White shot Melson twice, once in his arm and once in his head, while Alexander was shot in the spine. After White shot Alexander and Melson, two unsuspecting customers, a man and his 12-year-old daughter, entered the store. White attempted to force the customers into a freezer and, when they refused, then attempted to shoot them both at point-blank range. However, the gun misfired. Afterwards, White departed the store on foot, while the man and his daughter left the store in their car and reported the shootings to a nearby police officer. During the robbery, White robbed the store of $388 (equivalent to $1374 today).

Orange County deputy sheriffs found Jerry White lying on his side in a wooded area with cash in his pockets less than an hour after the shootings. When White was apprehended, police discovered that he had sustained gunshot wounds in the groin and left thigh. Police denied that he was shot during his arrest and stated that he accidentally shot himself while attempting to tuck his pistol back into his pants while he was still in the store.

Paramedics transported Melson and Alexander to the Orlando Regional Medical Center, where Melson was pronounced dead. Alexander remained in critical condition for days, being kept alive with a ventilator. Ultimately, his spinal cord injuries caused him to be paralyzed from the neck down and unable to speak for the rest of his life. Alexander remained in a Veterans Administration hospital in that condition, in severe pain according to his children and ex-wife, until he died in September 1985 of heart failure and other complications related to the injuries he sustained in the shooting.

== Trial ==
Jerry White's trial began on April 21, 1982. White, who was African American, had an all-white jury after all prospective black jurors were removed from the jury pool. Witnesses included the unsuspecting customers White had attempted to shoot. On the stand, both positively identified White as the man who had attempted to shoot them and stated that they saw him with cash in his pockets.

White testified at trial that he had requested that Alexander make change for $500, and that Alexander cheated him out of some money during the exchange. According to White, an argument ensued, during which he revealed a pistol to intimidate Alexander. He and Alexander fought over the gun in White's possession; White ultimately claimed that Melson and Alexander's shootings were accidental and that he had sustained the gunshot wounds to his groin and leg during the same struggle. Forensic evidence showed that Melson and Alexander were both shot execution-style, at point-blank range from behind.

The jury deliberated for 40 minutes before convicting White of first-degree murder and armed robbery. With an 11–1 vote, the jury recommended a death sentence for White on the murder charge, and on May 4, Orange County Judge R. James Stroker formally sentenced White to death. In passing the death sentence, Judge Stroker stated that White did not present enough mitigating circumstances to warrant receiving a life sentence instead of a death sentence and that White had not only "consistently chosen" to disregard society's rules and laws, but that White had also demonstrated a "callous disregard for human life" in murdering Melson and attempting to murder three others. In addition to the death sentence for murder, White was also sentenced to life imprisonment for the robbery. Authorities transported White to Florida's death row via the Orange County Sheriff's Office's plane later on May 4.

== Appeals ==
Following White's conviction, his first attorney, Emmett Moran, maintained White's innocence, claiming that prosecutors had selectively chosen the evidence they used against White and that there were undisclosed facts in the case that would have upheld White's version of events in the grocery store.

White's first appeal failed on a unanimous vote as the Supreme Court of Florida found that in spite of minor trial errors, none were significant enough to affect White's guilty verdict or death sentence. White's first execution date was scheduled for October 8, 1985, alongside fellow death row inmate Raleigh Porter. Ultimately, both White and Porter received stays of execution so courts could continue assessing their cases. White was denied an evidentiary hearing, but his execution was postponed. White's second death warrant was signed in 1990, but again, he received a stay of execution.

In late October 1985, White was given a new attorney, Dewey Villareal. In a petition for White to receive a new trial, Villareal accused White's former attorney Moran of providing inadequate counsel to White due to Moran's personal issues with alcoholism and cocaine addiction. Some trial attendees, including White's aunt Ella Carruthers and White's ex-fiancée Forster, claimed to have smelled alcohol on Moran's breath during the trial; the jury also laughed at Moran's mannerisms several times throughout the trial, and Moran's closing statement was allegedly "incoherent, convoluted, and illogical." The trial judge also criticized Moran for his lack of preparation for the sentencing phase of White's trial. At the time of Villareal's accusations, Moran was on suspension by the Florida Bar Association for misrepresenting facts in an unrelated case. Villareal accused Moran of failing to adequately prepare for White's trial and failing to pursue a defense of alcohol intoxication, which may have prevented White from being sentenced to death, based on the fact that White was heavily intoxicated during the commission of the crime. Villareal also accused Moran of using racial slurs and making other racist statements about Jerry White. When discussing a witness's identification of White, Moran allegedly told a police officer, "I don't know how they can tell with black people. They all look alike to me." In another statement, Villareal alleged that Moran told White, "Now, see, your ancestors, they haven't been running around in those jungles there for 300 or 400 years clearing those logs with tigers chasing them." Moran denied the accusations, claiming that he had never used cocaine and that his mannerisms during the trial were due to him having undiagnosed diabetes and were mistaken for drunkenness. Moran also accused White's new legal team of using "dirty tricks" to save White from execution. A judge ultimately determined in a 1986 hearing that Moran had done a satisfactory job defending White and rejected the petition for a new trial.

White's other appeals throughout the years were based on arguments that differing witness statements recovered after the trial, blood spatter evidence, and White's low IQ, measured at 72, would have likely made a difference to the jury in whether or not White would have deserved a death sentence. Each appeal resulted in his conviction and death sentence being upheld.

== Execution ==
Then-governor Lawton Chiles signed a third and final death warrant scheduling White's execution to take place on December 4, 1995, at 12:05 p.m. Three hours prior to the scheduled execution, White received a last meal consisting of grilled round steak, French fried potatoes, coleslaw, toast, and orange juice.

White was escorted to the electric chair shortly after noon. When asked for a final statement, White said, "I wish that all the people who can hear my voice will turn to the Lord Jesus Christ as I have." Prior to his execution, White had written a similar statement that he wanted to be released after he died, reading, "I have confessed all my sins before the Lord my God. I wish to express my sorrow to all of those I've pained."

The execution began moments after White gave his verbal final statement. Witnesses to White's execution reported that he let out a muffled scream after the electricity began flowing through his body and that he sustained the scream for some time, although it faded in intensity over time; the electricity was administered for approximately one minute. White was pronounced dead at 12:19 p.m.

== Aftermath ==
Following White's execution, another Florida death row inmate, Phillip Atkins, argued based on witness reports of White screaming during the flow of electricity that Florida's electric chair was malfunctioning and would subject him to unconstitutionally cruel and unusual punishment. Atkins was scheduled to be executed one hour later on the same day as White, but his argument earned him a delay, albeit an ultimately unsuccessful one. Atkins was executed in the electric chair the next day 22 hours later, at 10:00 a.m.

In 1999, the state of Florida heard a petition from Thomas Harrison Provenzano, another death row inmate, who argued that the electric chair was a cruel and unusual punishment. Provenzano used witness reports of six executions by electrocution in Florida, including the botched executions of Jerry White, Pedro Medina, and Allen Lee Davis, in his argument. During the proceedings, Michael Minerva, who had witnessed White's death, said that "White's body stiffened and was thrust upward and backward to the back of the electric chair" after the current had been switched on to the chair. He also said that he heard what sounded like "air moving through the lips, the throat, that kind of sound" from White's body, though he could not tell whether the air "was coming in or going out." Although Provenzano ultimately lost his petition, Florida began offering death row inmates the choice of lethal injection since the 2000 execution of Terry Melvin Sims. Provenzano was executed by lethal injection later in 2000.

== See also ==
- Capital punishment in Florida
- Capital punishment in the United States
- List of people executed in Florida
- List of people executed in the United States in 1995
