= Pedro Medina (murderer) =

Cuban-American murderer (1957–1997)

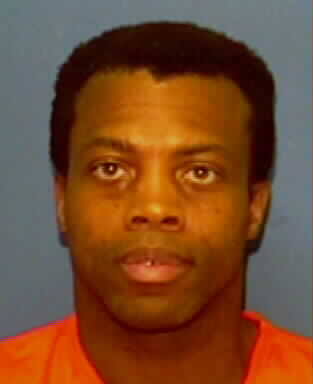
- Mug shot of Medina
- Born: Pedro Luis Medina; October 5, 1957; Cuba
- Died: March 25, 1997 (aged 39); Florida State Prison, Raiford, Florida, U.S.
- Cause of death: Botched execution by electrocution (destruction of the brain caused by immolation)
- Other name: Willie Lance
- Status: Executed
- Convictions: First degree murder, escape, grand larceny
- Penalty: Death

Pedro Luis Medina (October 5, 1957 – March 25, 1997) was a Cuban refugee who was executed in Florida for the murder of a 52-year-old woman in Orlando. The circumstances of his execution elevated objections to the use of electrocution as a means of capital punishment. During his execution, Medina's head burst into flames, filling the death chamber with smoke. An autopsy later revealed that the current had destroyed Medina's brain, killing him instantly.

== Crime and execution ==
Medina was among nearly 125,000 Cubans who were sent to the United States during the 1980 Mariel boatlift. He eventually lived with his half-sister in Orlando. His victim, Dorothy James, an elementary school gym teacher, lived in an apartment next door and befriended Medina.

Dorothy James was found dead in her apartment on April 4, 1982. She had been gagged, stabbed multiple times, and left to die. Early in the morning of April 8, 1982, Medina was found asleep in James' automobile at a rest area on Interstate 10 near Lake City and was arrested for theft of the automobile. The next day, detectives from Orange County, Florida investigating the murder of James interviewed Medina in the Columbia County Jail about the auto theft and the murder. Medina's explanation of how he came to be in James' vehicle was not believed by the detectives.

Medina was arrested and indicted for the murder of James. During his pretrial confinement, Medina exhibited signs of mental instability, including eating his own feces, and was once placed on suicide watch. He requested a psychiatric examination and was examined by two psychiatrists. Each determined that Medina met the statutory criteria for competence to stand trial, but was pretending to be insane. The trial court found Medina competent to stand trial.

Medina was tried before a jury in Orange County on March 15–18, 1983. Medina testified in his own defense and denied murdering James. However, Medina admitted being in James' apartment the night of the murder and that he was in James' apartment when James was dead. Medina also admitted that a hat found by police detectives on a bed near James' body was his hat and that he took James' automobile after she was murdered. Medina admitted driving James' automobile to Tampa and offering to sell the automobile to a man with whom he engaged in a fight at the time of the attempted sale. The man to whom Medina was selling the automobile testified that he gave Medina $250 for the automobile, but then Medina left with the automobile. When law enforcement officers searched the vehicle following Medina's arrest, a knife was found in the vehicle, although no blood was found on said knife and it could not be proven to be the murder weapon.

Medina was convicted of first-degree murder and auto theft. The jury, by a ten-to-two vote, recommended the death penalty for the murder conviction. The trial court found two aggravating circumstances and a single mitigating circumstance. The court found the aggravating circumstances outweighed the mitigating circumstance and sentenced Medina to death. His lawyers appealed, arguing that Medina was mentally ill based on psychiatric reports that suggested paranoid schizophrenia and had been incompetent at the time of his trial. The Florida Supreme Court ordered an evidentiary hearing to assess his sanity, and he was quickly deemed sane.

He was sent to death row at Florida State Prison near the town of Starke in 1982. Medina's last words before being executed on March 25, 1997, were, "I am still innocent." During the administration of electric current, the electric chair known as "Old Sparky" malfunctioned due to the use of a synthetic sponge, causing flames to shoot out of Medina's head.

== Controversy ==
In 1999, the state of Florida heard a petition from Thomas Harrison Provenzano, another death row inmate, that argued that the electric chair was a "cruel and unusual punishment". The petition cited the executions of Medina, Jesse Tafero and Allen Lee Davis to show a pattern of inhumane deaths in the electric chair. During the proceedings, Rev. Glenn Dickson, Medina's pastor, testified he saw the flames rising out of Medina's head, smelled an acrid smell and saw Medina take three labored breaths after the electric current to the chair had been turned off and the strap holding him in it had been loosened.

Patricia McCusker, Assistant Superintendent of the Work Camp at Florida State Prison, also testified. She said she saw Medina's left hand tighten as the current was being applied. She corroborated Dickson's observation of smoke and flames coming from Medina's head and a smell, which she said was a burning smell. McCusker claimed she also saw movements in Medina's chest after the current had been turned off, but claimed they were contractions of the chest muscle which did not imply breathing.

An autopsy found that Medina's death was instantaneous due to massive depolarization of the brain and brain stem when the first jolt of electricity surged through Medina's body. A doctor described it as like "turning the lights off". A neurologist testified that the apparent breathing movements were likely caused by the last vestiges of survival in the brain stem after the brain itself had died. Belle Almojera, a medical examiner working for the prison, also signed an affidavit stating that he had seen "no evidence of pain and suffering" and that Medina "died a very quick, humane death". A circuit court judge ruled that the flaws in the execution had been from "unintentional human error" rather than any faults in the electric chair's "apparatus, equipment, and electrical circuitry," though he did recommend that the lead legpiece be replaced with a more conductive brass electrode.

== See also ==
- Capital punishment in Florida
- Capital punishment in the United States
- List of people executed in Florida
- List of people executed in the United States in 1997
- List of people executed by electrocution
