= Sing Sing museum =

Coordinates: 41°9′11.0″N 73°52′10.6″W

Sing Sing Museum or the Sing Sing Prison Museum is a proposed museum in the original power house at the northern end of Sing Sing prison in New York state. The museum will detail incarceration in the United States and in Sing Sing specifically. Following a series of delays, programming and the initial exhibition was planned for 2025, the prison's bicentennial year.

Historic Hudson River Towns, the agency developing the latest efforts to create the museum, has been working to redevelop the former power plant, which powered Old Sparky. While plans for the museum date back to the early 2000s, if not earlier, efforts began again in earnest in 2014–2015. There are also discussions to use the original cell block, which survived a fire, to tell the prison's story.

== See also ==
- Angola Prison museum
- Eastern State penitentiary
- Ohio State Reformatory
