= Gruesome Gertie =

Louisiana electric chair

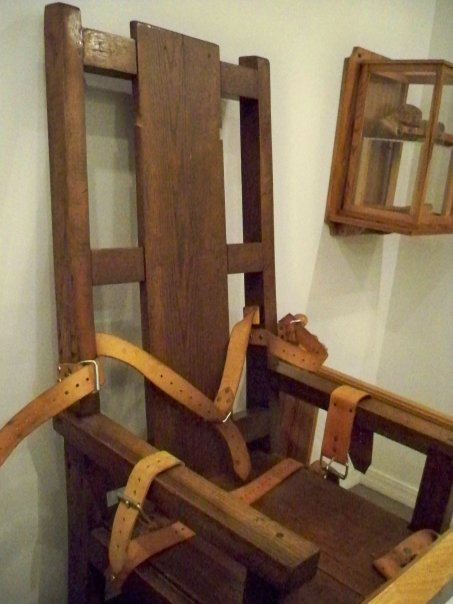
Gruesome Gertie at the Louisiana State Penitentiary museum

Gruesome Gertie was the nickname given by death row inmates to the electric chair in Louisiana, United States.

It is also widely known for the failed execution of Willie Francis.

== History ==
The 1940 Louisiana legislature changed the method of execution, making execution by electrocution effective from June 1, 1941. Louisiana's electric chair did not have a permanent home at first, and was taken from parish to parish to perform the executions. The electrocution would usually be carried out in the courthouse or jail of the parish where the condemned inmate had been convicted. Eugene Johnson, a black man convicted of robbing and murdering Steven Bench, a white farmer who lived near Albany, was the first to die in Louisiana's electric chair; he was electrocuted in the Livingston Parish Jail on September 11, 1941.

In 1957, it was decided to build an execution chamber at the Louisiana State Penitentiary to carry out all executions in Louisiana. Notable executions in the chair were those of Toni Jo Henry (the only woman executed in Louisiana's electric chair), Elmo Patrick Sonnier (the inmate on whom the film Dead Man Walking was based) and Willie Francis (the only inmate to survive the electric chair; he was ultimately executed after the first attempt failed). From passage of legislation in 1991 until 2024, the State of Louisiana opted for the use of lethal injection as the sole method of execution. The last person executed on "Gruesome Gertie" was Andrew Lee Jones, on July 22, 1991. During its 50 years, "Gruesome Gertie" was used for a total of 87 executions. It now sits at the Louisiana Prison Museum in Angola, Louisiana. "Gruesome Gertie" was reinstated in 2024, along with the addition of nitrogen hypoxia.

"Gruesome Gertie" was also used as a film prop in Monster's Ball (2001), in which Sean "Diddy" Combs can be seen sitting in the chair.

== Botched execution ==
"Gruesome Gertie" is also infamous for having the first known incident of a failed execution by electrocution in the United States. During the execution of Willie Francis on May 3, 1946, the electric chair had been improperly set up by a drunken prison guard, causing Francis to scream "Take it off! Take it off! Let me breathe!" from behind his leather hood. The execution was aborted, and an appeal was filed to the Supreme Court, which was denied. Francis was later successfully executed on May 9, 1947.

== Cultural references ==
- "Gruesome Gertie" appeared in the film Monster's Ball for the execution sequence. These scenes with the chair were filmed in the actual execution chamber at Louisiana State Penitentiary, where "Gruesome Gertie" had been used for real executions a decade earlier.
- "Gruesome Gertie" is the instrument of death in Ernest J. Gaines's novel A Lesson Before Dying. It's used to execute the young black man Jefferson, for a murder he didn't commit. It's also mentioned in another Gaines' novel set in Louisiana, The Tragedy of Brady Sims.
- "Gruesome Gertie" is also mentioned in James Lee Burke's novel "A Private Cathedral."

== Gallery ==
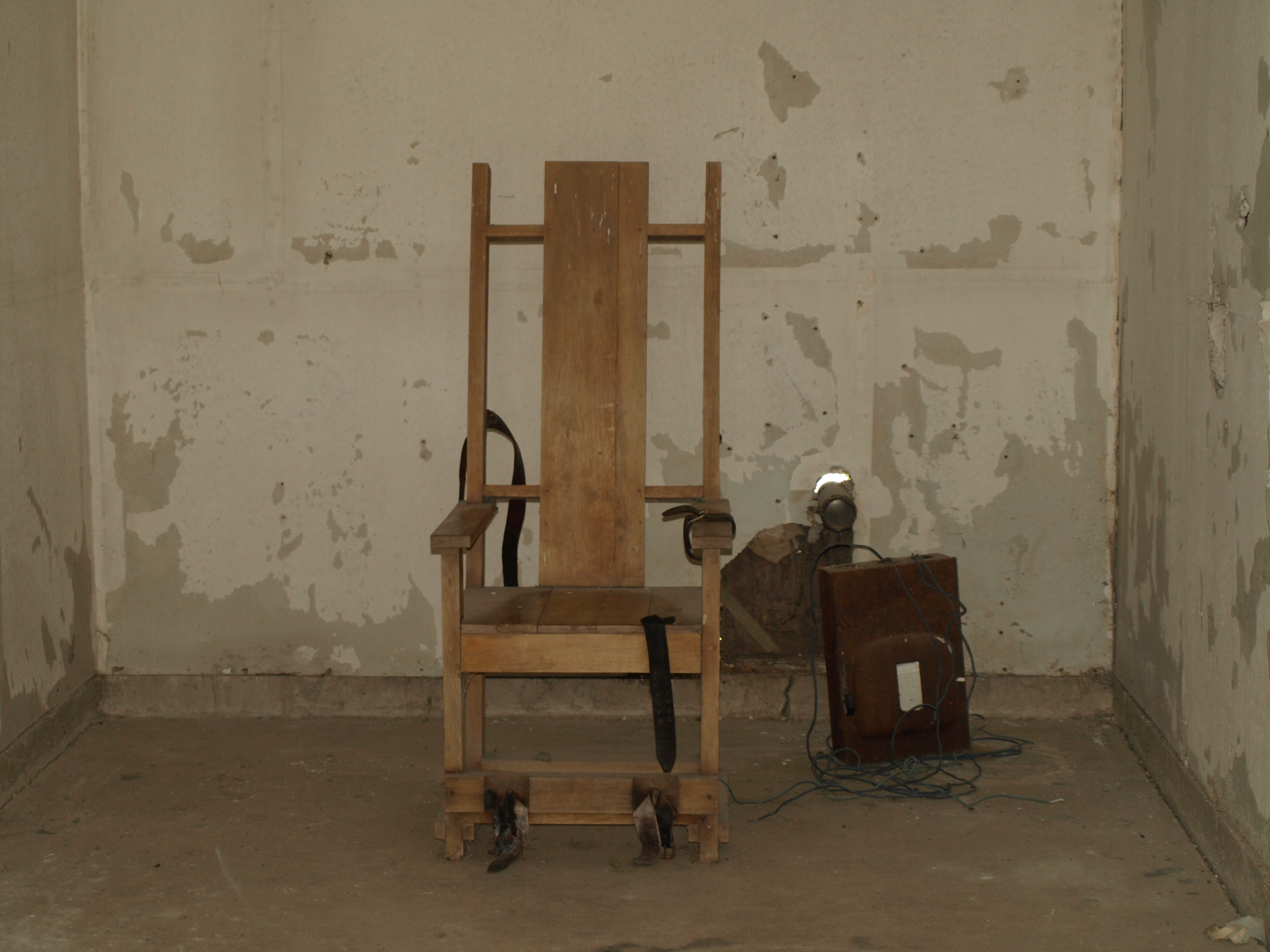
The former execution chamber at the Red Hat Cell Block; the electric chair is a replica of the original Gruesome Gertie

== See also ==
- Capital punishment in Louisiana
- List of people executed in Louisiana
- List of people executed by electrocution
- Red Hat Cell Block
- Old Smokey
- Old Sparky
- Yellow Mama
