= Red Hat Cell Block =

- Red Hat Cell Block, Louisiana State Penitentiary
- U.S. National Register of Historic Places
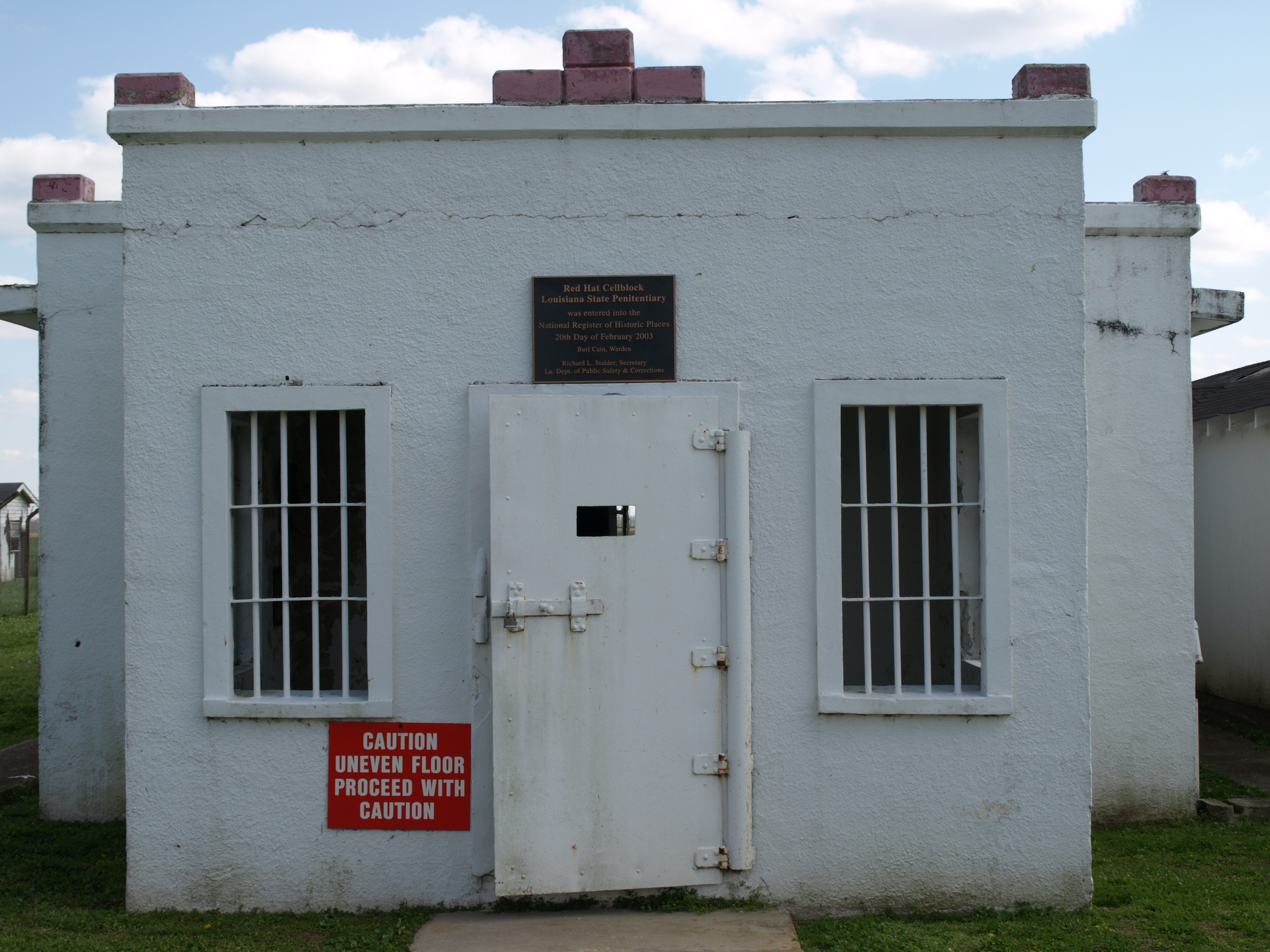
- Red Hat Cell Block

- Location within Louisiana Location within the United States
- Location: Louisiana State Penitentiary, Angola, Louisiana
- Coordinates: 30°57′56″N 91°36′49″W
- Area: less than one acre
- Built: 1935
- NRHP reference No.: 03000041
- Added to NRHP: February 20, 2003

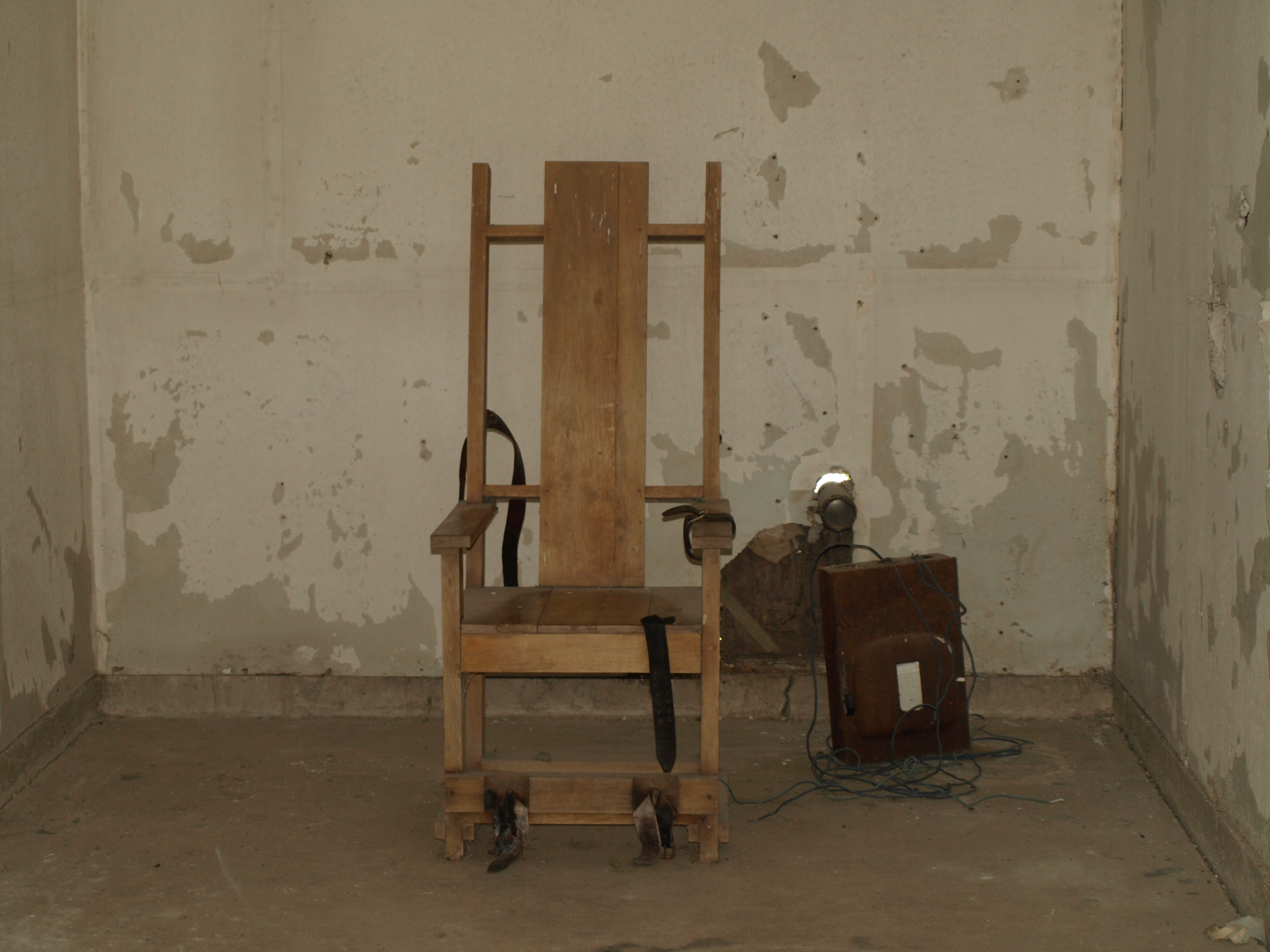
The former execution chamber; the electric chair is a replica of the original (Gruesome Gertie)

The Red Hat Cell Block is a former prison housing unit of the Louisiana State Penitentiary in West Feliciana Parish, Louisiana which, for a time, also contained the state's execution chamber and electric chair.

After a 1933 escape attempt, prison authorities constructed a new prisoner cell block, a one-story, 30-cell building at Camp E. That cell block, which became the most restrictive inmate housing unit in Angola, was colloquially referred to as "Red Hat", after the red paint-coated straw hats that its occupants wore when they worked in the fields.

After a federal court ordered Louisiana prison authorities to enact reforms at Angola, Warden C. Murray Henderson phased out "Red Hat", and in 1972 Elayn Hunt had "Red Hat" officially closed. Red Hat became a dog kennel. In 1977 Camp J took "Red Hat"'s role as the most restrictive housing unit in Angola. On February 20, 2003, the National Park Service listed the Red Hat Cell Block on the National Register of Historic Places as #03000041.

== Composition ==
Red Hat had 30 prison cells. Each cell measured 3 feet (0.91 m) by 6 feet (1.8 m); a solid steel door was the point of entry and egress. Each cell had a 1-square-foot (0.093 m^{2}) window near the cell's roof for ventilation; prison guards controlled a steel flap located at each cell window. Each cell housed an iron bunk without a mattress. To urinate and defecate, prisoners used a steel bucket that was emptied every morning. Four guard towers were in proximity to Red Hat; guards in those towers had orders to "shoot to kill."

== Inmate life ==
Brooke Shelby Biggs of Mother Jones said that men who had lived in "Red Hat" "told of a dungeon crawling with rats, where dinner was served in stinking buckets splashed onto the floors." The food consumed by Red Hat prisoners was leftovers from the cafeteria serving the rest of Camp E. The leftovers were placed in wheelbarrows and given to the Red Hat prisoners. Some prisoners were not wearing clothes while confined to their cells.

== See also ==
- Gruesome Gertie
