= Old Sparky =

Nickname for electric chairs

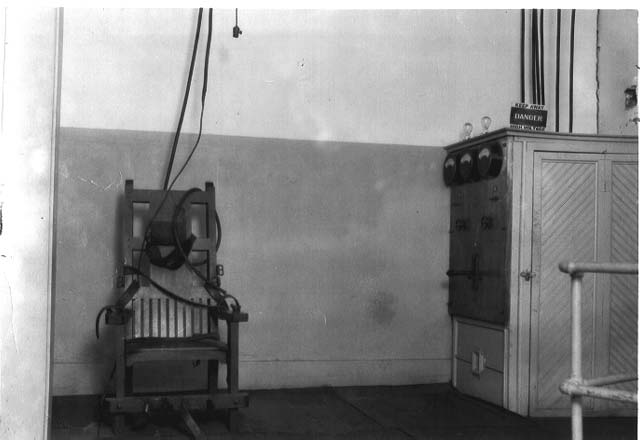
Old Sparky at the Tucker Unit, Arkansas. It was used to conduct 104 executions from 1926 to 1948.

Old Sparky is the nickname of the electric chairs in Arkansas, Connecticut, Florida, Georgia, Illinois, Kentucky, Nebraska, New York, Ohio, Oklahoma, South Carolina, Texas, Virginia, and West Virginia. Old Betsy was the nickname of the electric chair that was used in Indiana, and Old Smokey is the nickname of the electric chairs used in New Jersey, Pennsylvania, and Tennessee. "Old Sparky" is sometimes used to refer to electric chairs in general, and not one of a specific state.

== Connecticut ==
Connecticut legislated lethal injection as its sole method of execution in 1995. The last person executed by electrocution was Joseph "Mad Dog" Taborsky in May 1960. Connecticut's "Old Sparky" has not been tested since it was moved from Wethersfield to the Connecticut Correctional Institution in Somers in 1962, and prison officials claim the prison's electrical system cannot handle it.

== Florida ==
The electric chair was the sole means of execution in Florida from 1924 until 2000, when the Florida Legislature, under pressure from the Supreme Court of the United States, signed lethal injection into law. Although no one has been executed in this manner since 1999, prisoners awaiting execution on Florida's death row may still be electrocuted at their request. It is currently located in Florida State Prison on the outskirts of Starke. It was known for frequent malfunctions in the 1990s, namely in the cases of Jesse Tafero (executed May 4, 1990), Pedro Medina (executed March 25, 1997) and Allen Lee Davis (executed July 8, 1999). Reportedly, 6-inch flames shot out of Tafero's head and 12-inch flames shot out of Medina's head, raising the question whether use of the electric chair was "cruel and unusual punishment". After the Medina execution, which was reportedly painless in spite of the flames, Florida Attorney General Bob Butterworth commented, "People who wish to commit murder, they'd better not do it in the state of Florida because we may have a problem with the electric chair."

Investigators have been unable to identify the cause of the problems. The wooden chair had been replaced in early 1999 to accommodate Davis's girth. The electrical components remained the same for the system.

To ensure proper contact between the inmate's head and the electrode, a sponge soaked with saline solution stuffed between the two was necessary. In the Tafero incident, a natural sponge was replaced with a synthetic sponge that caught fire during the execution. In the Medina incident, prison officials apparently did not properly soak the sponge in saline solution and it caught fire as well. Photographs provided after Davis' execution showed that he suffered a bloody nose during the event.

=== Davis execution ===
The 1999 execution of Allen Lee Davis incited outrage after witnesses saw his white shirt rapidly turn red with blood during his execution. Prison officials later determined the blood came from a profuse nosebleed, most likely caused by an improperly fitted head strap. The source of the blood was not evident to witnesses during execution, because Davis's head was covered with a traditional hood. A prison inspector general took photographs of Davis's bloody body, still strapped in the chair, shortly after execution. These photographs later became key evidence in several cases mounting yet another challenge to the constitutionality of the electric chair. These lawsuits ultimately came to the Supreme Court of Florida in the fall of 1999, when a majority (4 of the 7 Justices) found that the electric chair was constitutional in a case brought by death row inmate Thomas Provenzano. One of the dissenting Justices, Leander J. Shaw Jr., took the extraordinary step of attaching to his opinion three color photographs of Davis's bloody body strapped in the chair. This publication marked the first time those photographs had surfaced on the Internet or, for that matter, anywhere outside court and prison files.

The execution contributed to the debate over Florida's adherence to electrocution and to the international debate over capital punishment in general. The Florida Supreme Court's Web servers repeatedly crashed under the demand for access to the photographs, reputed to be the first actual photographs of an American state execution in decades. The images were used during a protest demonstration in Madrid in support of a Spaniard on Florida's death row. Some death penalty supporters in the United States viewed the photographs as a deterrent, apparently believing they had been posted on the Web site as a warning to all potentially dangerous criminals.

==== Political response ====
Some Florida politicians vowed to never eliminate the electric chair despite the debate, but events rapidly changed after the Supreme Court of the United States agreed to hear an appeal from the Florida Supreme Court's split decision upholding electrocution. The nation's high court had declined to review appeals after the prior three malfunctions, so observers concluded that the nation's high court now had come to view Florida's death penalty problems more dimly. Partly on the advice of Attorney General Butterworth, Florida's Governor Jeb Bush summoned the legislature into special session and in early 2000 it quickly approved lethal injection as the means of execution that must be used unless the inmate requests electrocution. The Attorney General then notified the Federal court and it agreed to dismiss the case based on the change in law.

== Georgia ==
Georgia's electric chair, known as "Old Sparky", located at Georgia State Prison was installed in 1924 following the state's abolition of hanging and was the sole method of execution in Georgia until October 25, 2001. The original chair, which was painted white, was replaced in 1980 and sent from the Georgia Diagnostic and Classification Center back to Reidsville, while a squat, varnished replacement was constructed to replace it. Between 1924 and 1998, Georgia electrocuted 441 prisoners. Today the original chair is on public display at Georgia State Prison, while its replacement is situated in a closet near the death chamber at the Georgia Diagnostic and Classification Center. It was used in the 1945 execution of Lena Baker. In 1996, Georgia State Representative Doug Teper unsuccessfully sponsored a bill to replace the state's electric chair with a guillotine in order to facilitate the use of the condemned prisoners' remains in organ donation.

== Kentucky ==
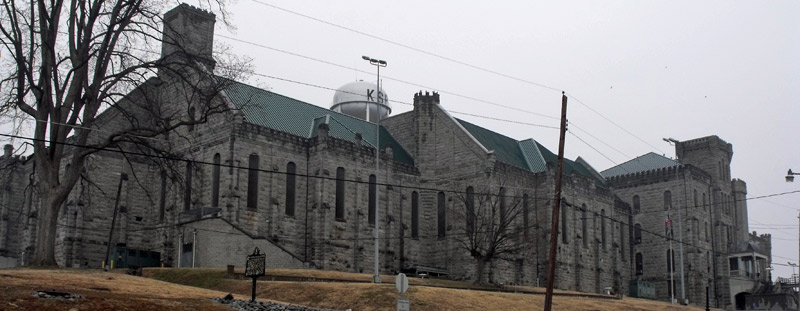
The Kentucky State Penitentiary in Eddyville houses Kentucky's Old Sparky

Kentucky's electric chair, known as "Old Sparky", is located at the Kentucky State Penitentiary in Eddyville, Kentucky. It was first used on July 8, 1911; the first inmate to die in the chair was James Buckner, convicted of killing a police officer several weeks earlier. On July 13, 1928, Kentucky tied a record with New York State by electrocuting seven men in its chair on the same day, one immediately after the other. News accounts report the process began at midnight and all seven were killed within two and a half hours. The state has decommissioned the electric chair except for those whose capital crimes were committed prior to March 31, 1998, and choose death by electrocution rather than death by lethal injection or if lethal injection is declared unconstitutional by a court. Prior to this legislated date, 163 deaths had occurred in Kentucky's electric chair. The last such execution by electric chair occurred on July 1, 1997, when convicted murderer Harold McQueen, Jr. was executed in it.

== New York ==
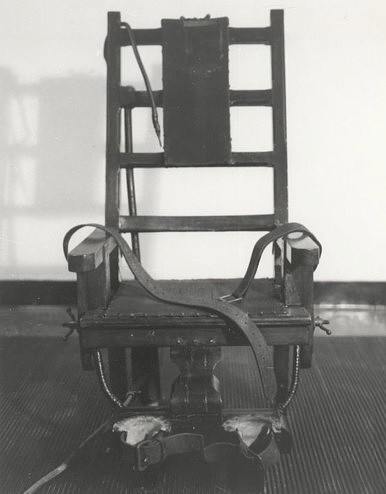
The electric chair at Sing Sing prison in the early 20th century

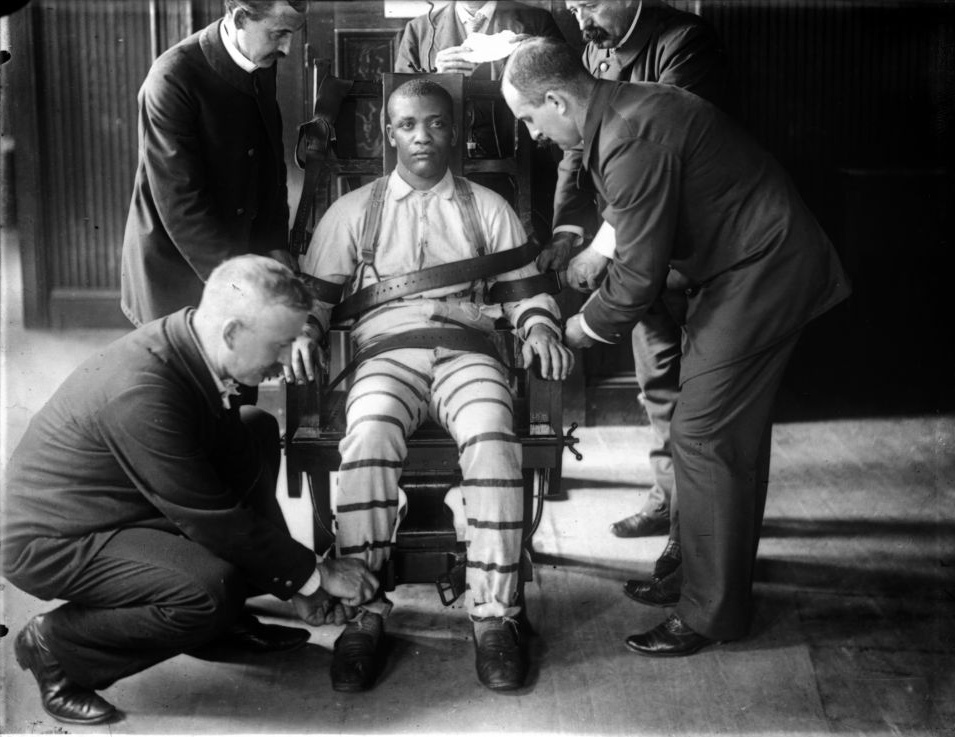
An inmate being strapped into the electric chair at Sing Sing prison ca. 1900 by William van der Weyde

In 1887, New York State established a committee to determine a new, more humane system of execution to replace hanging. Alfred P. Southwick, a member of the committee, developed the idea of putting electric current through a device after hearing about how relatively painlessly and quickly a drunken man died after touching exposed power lines. As Southwick was a dentist accustomed to performing procedures on sitting subjects, his electrical device appeared in the form of a chair.

On June 4, 1888, Governor David B. Hill authorized the introduction of the electric chair. It was first used two years later when William Kemmler became the first person in the world to be executed by electricity at Auburn Prison, Auburn, New York on August 6, 1890.

"Old Sparky" was first used at Sing Sing prison for a mass execution on July 7, 1891. The order of execution, which would start at 4:30 a.m., was listed as James J. Slocum, Harris Smiler, Shibuya Jugiro, and Joseph Wood.

From 1914, all executions in New York state were conducted at Sing Sing prison using "Old Sparky". After a series of escapes from death row, the Death House at Sing Sing was built in 1920 and began executions in 1922. It was a prison within the Sing Sing prison. The Death House block, which had its own hospital, kitchen, visiting room, and exercise yard, had 24 single cells plus an additional three cells for condemned women. A chamber where a prisoner spent their last day was nicknamed the "Dance Hall". A corridor, known as the "Last Mile", connected the ante-room to the execution chamber in which the electric chair was situated.

Executions at Sing Sing were traditionally carried out at 11 p.m. on Thursdays. Condemned prisoners would be brought into the execution room escorted by seven guards and the prison chaplain. Already waiting in the room would be the warden of Sing Sing, the state electrician, two doctors and twelve state-appointed witnesses. After the condemned prisoner was strapped into the chair and the electrodes attached, the warden would step forward and read out the final decision on the sentence. The prisoner would be asked for any last words or for a benediction. With a signal, the execution would then begin. Witnesses would leave once both doctors had confirmed that death had occurred.

In 75 years of operation, 695 people were executed in electric chairs in New York state correctional facilities (614 at Sing Sing, including the Rosenbergs' 1953 execution for espionage). The last person to be executed in New York state was Eddie Lee Mays who was electrocuted at Sing Sing on August 15, 1963. Two years later the State of New York abolished capital punishment. In 1995 the state reinstated death penalty by lethal injection. However, no executions were performed under the 1995 statute, and in 2004, the New York Court of Appeals ruled in People v. LaValle that state death penalty violated the state's constitution.

== Ohio ==
Ohio was the second state to adopt the electric chair as a means of execution, executing 315 people between 1897 and 1963. The state stopped using the electric chair in 2001, and now exclusively utilizes lethal injection in executions. Ohio's Old Sparky is now a museum exhibit in the Ohio State Reformatory.

== South Carolina ==
The state installed the "Old Sparky" in 1912 at the Central Correctional Institution (CCI) in Columbia. In 1944 it was used to execute 14-year-old George Stinney, the youngest person to be sentenced to death in the United States for more than a century. In 1990, the chair was relocated to the newly built Broad River Correctional Institution and was used to execute serial killer Donald Henry Gaskins, the first white defendant to be executed for the murder of a black person in South Carolina history. Today, It is still managed by the South Carolina Department of Corrections, and is the oldest electric chair still online in the world.

In 1997, all death row inmates were relocated from Broad River to the Lieber Correctional Institution. The move provided better management controls and ensured correctional staff who dealt with condemned prisoners on a daily basis were not the same officers given the responsibility of carrying out capital punishment.

The most recent use of "Old Sparky" was on June 21, 2008 when convicted murderer James Earl Reed opted for this method of execution.

Under Act 43 of 2021, the electric chair is now the primary method of execution, although the prisoner can still choose the firing squad or lethal injection.

== Texas ==
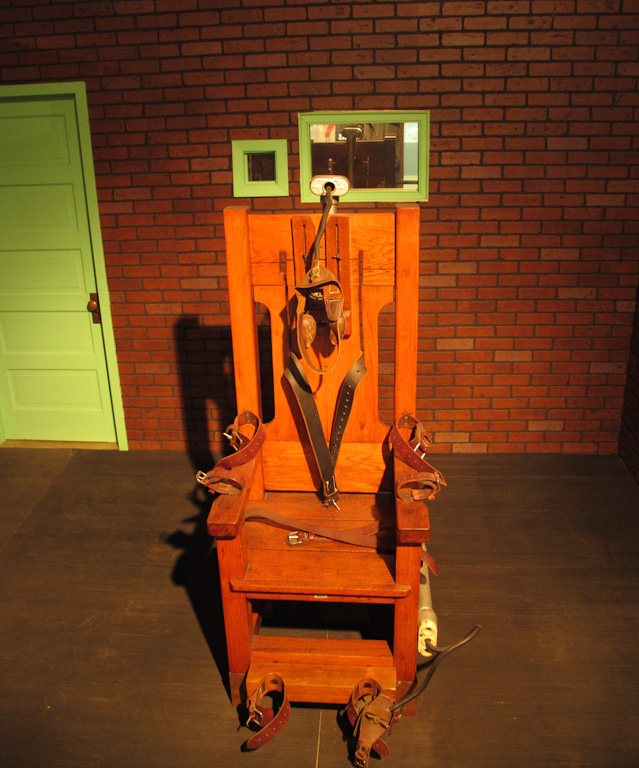
Old Sparky, the electric chair formerly used at Huntsville Unit prison, Texas

The Texas electric chair to which the name "Old Sparky" is applied was in use from 1924 to 1964. During that time, it saw the deaths of 361 prisoners sentenced to die by judicial electrocution. It was built by incarcerated craftsmen in 1924. Following its decommissioning, it was originally relegated to a prison dump before being rescued. Today, it is on public display as part of a replica death chamber at the Texas Prison Museum in Huntsville, Texas, along with tubing and straps used in Texas's first execution by lethal injection.

In 1971, the Greater Dallas Crime Commission, a business organization, circulated a petition to recommission Texas's "Old Sparky". The petition received 10,620 endorsements.

== West Virginia ==
The now-decommissioned electric chair known as "Old Sparky" at the now-closed West Virginia Penitentiary in Moundsville, West Virginia was installed in a facility originally used for hanging. It was in use from 1951 until 1959, during which time nine condemned prisoners were executed in the chair. The chair was bolted to a low platform which covered what had previously been the trapdoor of the gallows used in the state's judicial hangings. Its control apparatus was designed in such a way that three push-button switches were to be simultaneously pressed by three members of the execution team; only one of these switches actually completed the circuit, allowing each member of the execution team to reassure himself that perhaps he had not been the one who had actually initiated the death of the condemned.

== Notable executions ==
- Frank Abbandando (1910–1942), mobster and contract killer (Sing Sing Prison, New York)
- Lepke Buchalter (1897–1944), mobster (Sing Sing Prison)
- Allen Lee Davis (1944–1999), triple murderer (Florida State Prison)
- Martin Goldstein (1905–1941), mobster (Sing Sing Prison)
- Nicholas Ingram (1963–1995), murderer and robber (Georgia Diagnostic and Classification State Prison, Georgia)
- Eddie Lee Mays (1929–1963), murderer and robber (Sing Sing Prison)
- Ted Bundy (1946-1989), serial murderer (Florida State Prison)
- Pedro Medina (murderer) (1957–1997), murderer (Florida State Prison)
- James Earl Reed (1958–2008), double murderer (Broad River Correctional Institution, South Carolina)
- John Spenkelink (1949–1979), murderer (Florida State Prison)
- Harry Strauss (1909–1941), contract killer and mobster (Sing Sing Prison)
- Jesse Tafero (1946–1990), double murderer (Florida State Prison)
- Giuseppe Zangara (1900–1933), failed assassin of Franklin D. Roosevelt (Florida State Prison)

== In popular culture ==
- The Green Mile by Stephen King and its film adaptation use "Old Sparky" as the official method of execution.
- In an episode of King of the Hill, Dale Gribble, excited about being on the executioner list as a new employee of a local prison, asks the prison warden where "Old Sparky" is. The warden explains that "Old Sparky" is no longer, replaced by lethal injection. Dale then asks where "Old Squirty" is, a variation on the original title.
- In the Showtime series Dexter and in the related novels, serial killer Dexter Morgan frequently cites "Old Sparky" as the consequence of his being caught.
- In the horror suspense film Constantine (2005), Club owner and neutral angel Papa Midnite and John Constantine make use of the "Old Sparky" chair from Sing Sing prison to help John locate the Spear of Destiny.
- "Old Sparky" also appeared in the film, Ted Bundy (2002) directed by Matthew Bright which dramatizes the serial killings of Ted Bundy portrayed by Michael Reilly Burke. His execution is also depicted in the film, but it is carried out inaccurately.
- The Reckoning by John Grisham mentions "Old Sparky" as the first portable electric chair in history used by Mississippi State Penitentiary.
- The Netflix series Ratched features an electric chair at the beginning of episode eight, named "Big Sparky" instead of "Old Sparky". However, it is notable that California, the state in which the series is set, has never used the electric chair, though the chair's nickname is reminiscent of the nickname for California's gas chamber, "The Big Sleep."

== See also ==
- Gruesome Gertie, the nickname given to Louisiana's electric chair
- Old Smokey, the nickname given to New Jersey and Pennsylvania and Tennessee's electric chairs.
- Yellow Mama, the nickname given to Alabama's electric chair
- List of people executed by electrocution
