= Texas Prison Museum =

Prison museum in Huntsville, Texas

Coordinates: 30.7357°N 95.5844°W

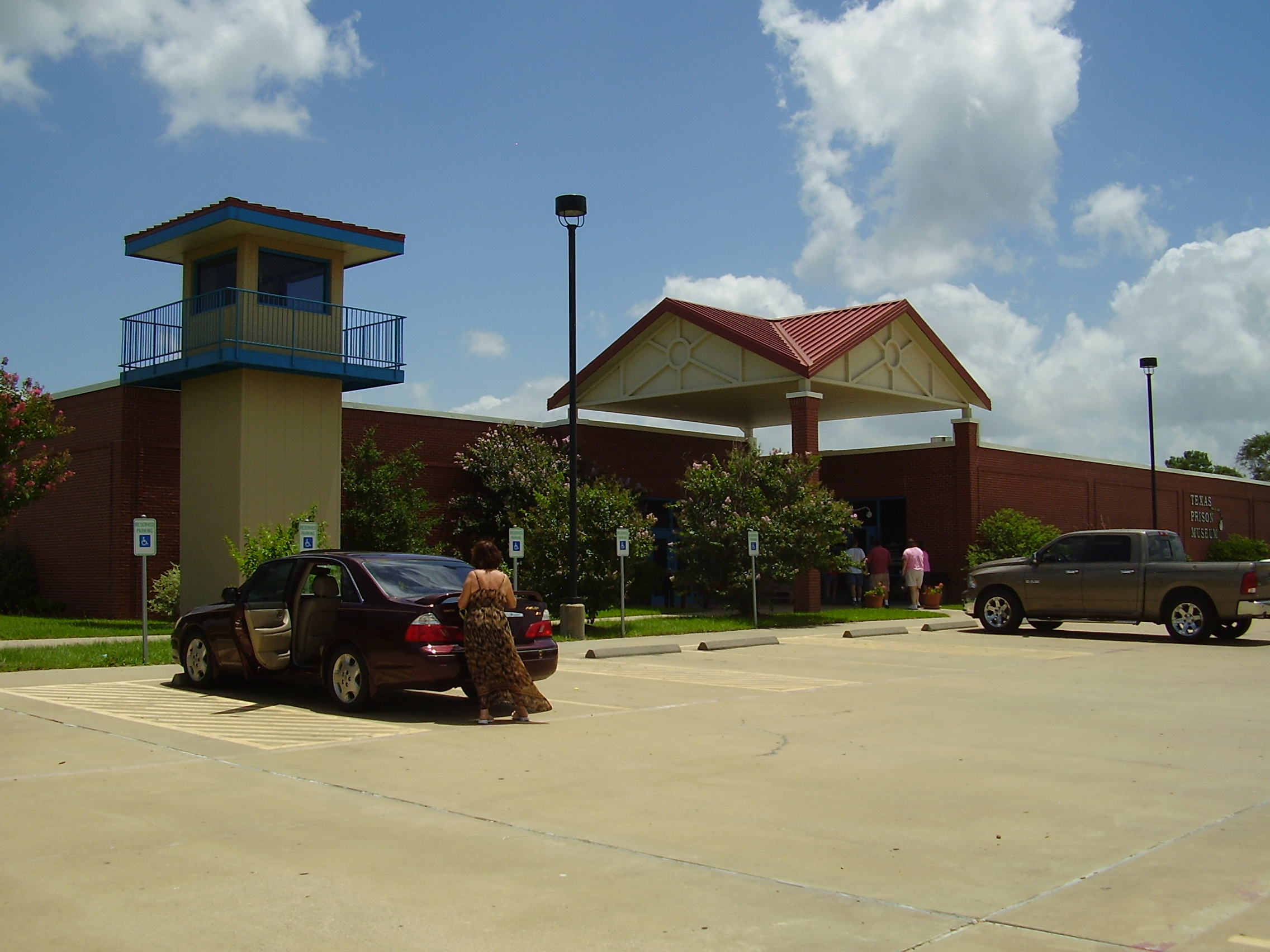
- Established: 1989
- Location: Huntsville, Texas, U.S.
- Type: Prison museum
- Key holdings: "Old Sparky" electric chair

The Texas Prison Museum is located in Huntsville, Texas.

The non-profit museum features the history of the prison system in Texas (Huntsville is the home of the Texas Department of Criminal Justice and several prisons including the Ellis Unit which previously housed death row, and Huntsville Unit which houses the execution chamber). There are many different artifacts in the museum, including an electric chair named "Old Sparky" that was formerly used from 1924 to 1964 as the primary means of execution.

Other exhibits include a life-size replica of a prison cell and a display of the Texas prison rodeo. The museum also has a large display of artwork, woodwork, and more created by prisoners.

The museum was founded in 1989 and originally located in downtown Huntsville. It moved to its current location northwest of town (on Texas State Highway 75 at Interstate 45 Exit 118) in 2002.
