= Execution chamber =

Room where capital punishment is administered

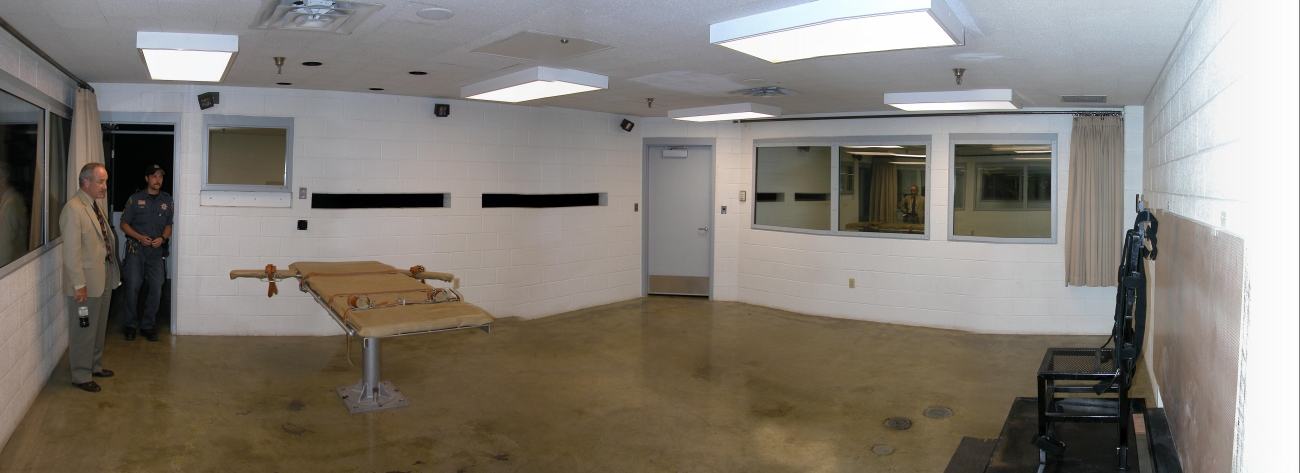
The execution chamber of the Utah State Prison

An execution chamber, or death chamber, is a room or chamber in which capital punishment is carried out. Execution chambers are almost always inside the walls of a maximum-security prison, although not always at the same prison where the death row population is housed. Inside the chamber is the apparatus used to carry out the death sentence.

== United States ==
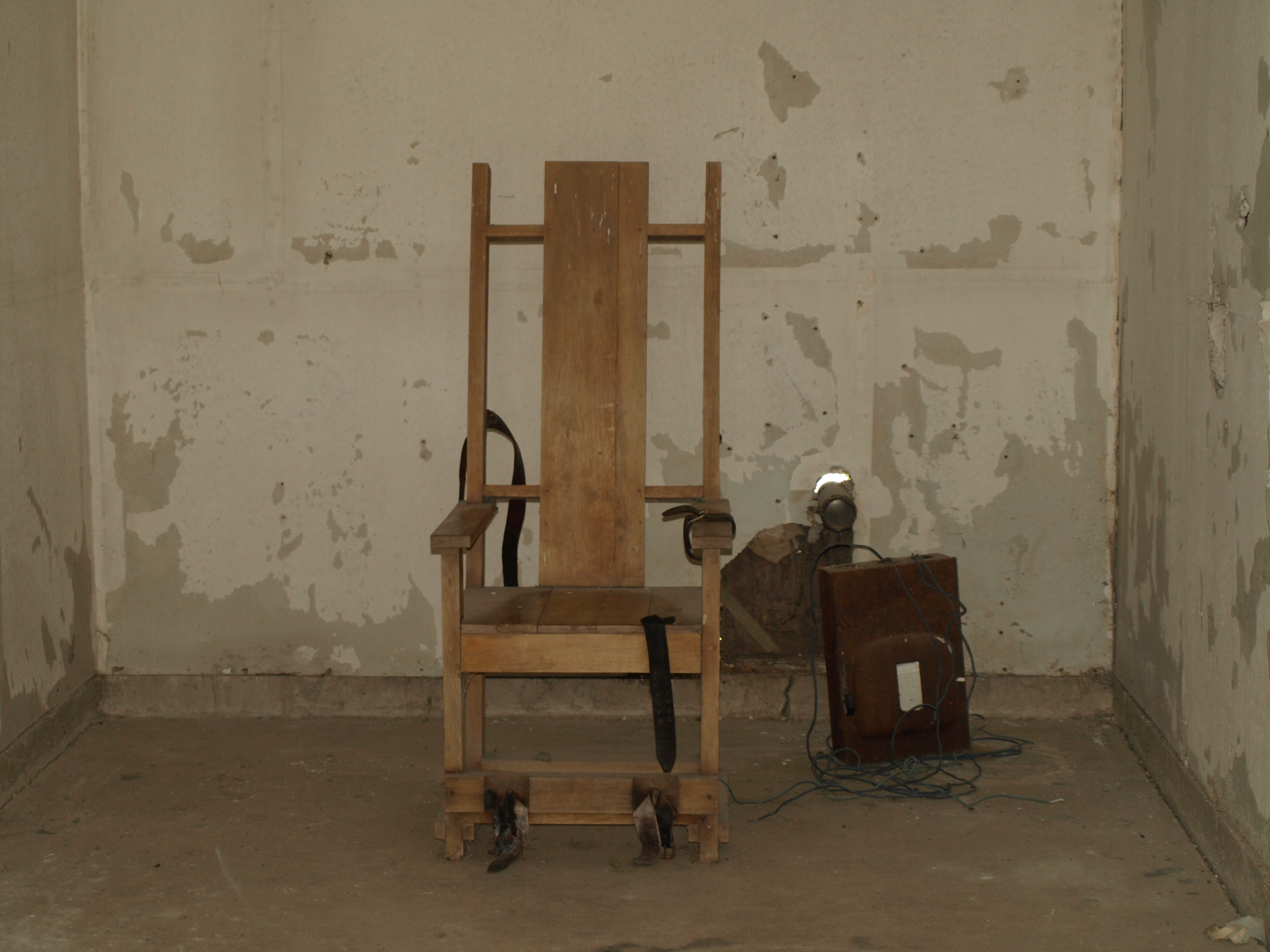
The former State of Louisiana execution chamber at the Red Hat Cell Block in the Louisiana State Penitentiary in West Feliciana Parish. The electric chair is a replica of the original.

In the United States, an execution chamber will usually contain a lethal injection table. In most cases, a witness room is located adjacent to an execution chamber, where witnesses may watch the execution through glass windows. All except for two of the states which allow capital punishment are equipped with a death chamber, but many states rarely put them to use. The exceptions are New Hampshire, which has no execution chamber (although one inmate remains on death row since the abolition of capital punishment in that state is not retroactive) and California, which has no execution chambers after the lethal injection room and gas chamber were removed in 2019. Kansas, Nevada, and Wyoming are the only states to have an execution chamber, which is equipped to execute an inmate by lethal injection, which has never been used, while the states of New Jersey and New York formerly had lethal injection chambers which were never used while the death penalty remained legal.

The National Ethics Council of the American Institute of Architects ruled in 2019 that its members may continue to design execution chambers in jurisdictions where they are legal. (however "Rule 1.402 would preclude a member from designing a facility intended for torture ...").

=== Locations ===
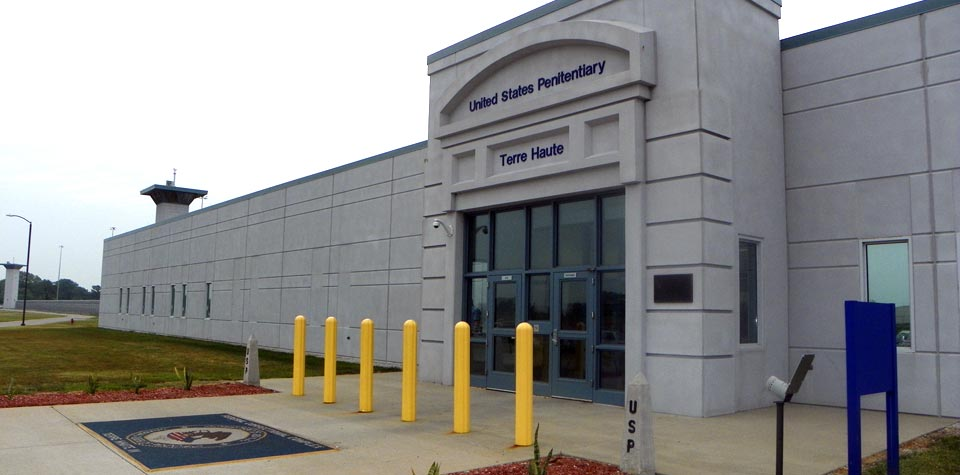
United States Penitentiary, Terre Haute houses the federal government execution chamber

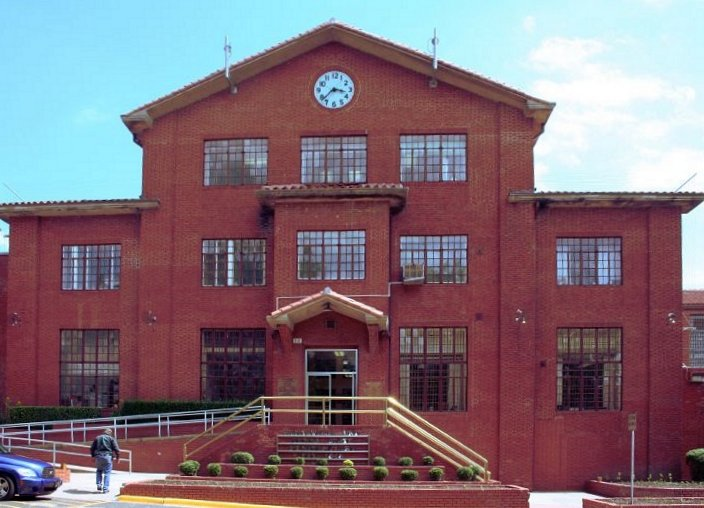
Huntsville Unit houses the Texas execution chamber; it is the most active execution chamber in the United States, with 528 executions between 1982 and 2015.

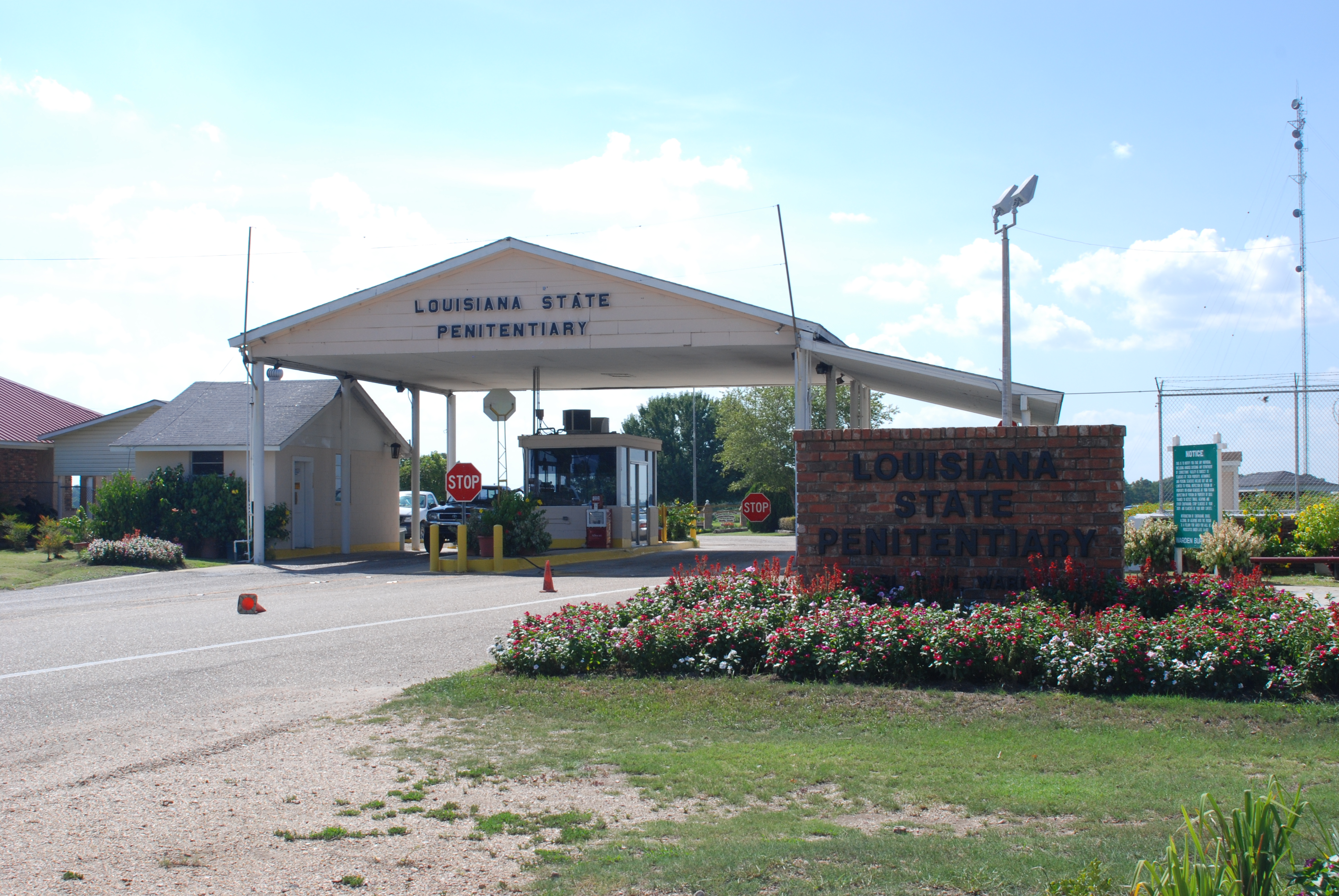
Louisiana State Penitentiary houses the Louisiana execution chamber

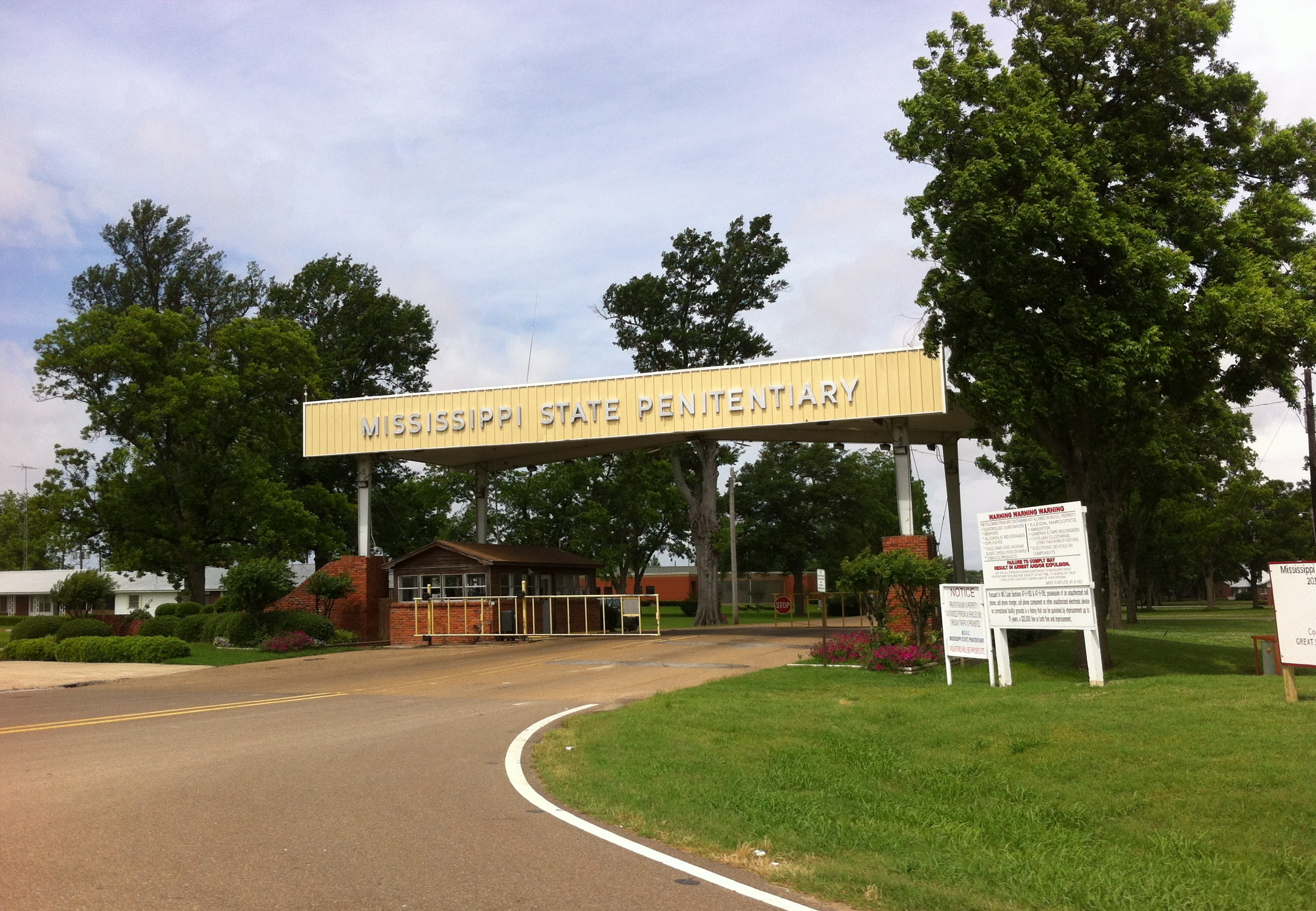
Mississippi State Penitentiary houses the Mississippi execution chamber

	Execution chamber
Federal	Terre Haute, Indiana (Federal Correctional Complex, Terre Haute)
Military	To Be Determined by the Secretary of the Army^{[a]}

State	Status	Execution chamber
Alabama	Active	Escambia County (Holman Correctional Facility)
Arizona	Active	Florence (Arizona State Prison Complex – Florence)
Arkansas	Active	Lincoln County (Cummins Unit)
California	Defunct	Marin County (San Quentin State Prison)
Colorado	Defunct^{[b]}	Fremont County (Colorado State Penitentiary)
Connecticut	Defunct^{[c]}	Somers (Osborn Correctional Institution)
Delaware	Defunct	New Castle County (James T. Vaughn Correctional Center)
Florida	Active	Bradford County (Florida State Prison)
Georgia	Active	Butts County (Georgia Diagnostic and Classification State Prison)
Idaho	Active	Kuna (Idaho Maximum Security Institution)
Illinois	Defunct^{[d]}	Tamms (Tamms Correctional Center)
Indiana	Active	Michigan City (Indiana State Prison)
Kansas	Active	Lansing (Lansing Correctional Facility)
Kentucky	Active	Eddyville (Kentucky State Penitentiary)
Louisiana	Active	West Feliciana Parish (Louisiana State Penitentiary)
Maryland	Defunct^{[e]}	Baltimore (Metropolitan Transition Center)
Mississippi	Active	Sunflower County (Mississippi State Penitentiary)
Missouri	Active	Bonne Terre (Eastern Reception, Diagnostic and Correctional Center)
Montana	Active	Powell County (Montana State Prison)
Nebraska	Active	Lincoln (Nebraska State Penitentiary)
Nevada	Active	White Pine County (Ely State Prison)
New Hampshire	Defunct^{[f]}	Concord (New Hampshire State Prison for Men)
New Jersey	Defunct^{[g]}	Trenton (New Jersey State Prison)
New Mexico	Defunct^{[h]}	Santa Fe County (Penitentiary of New Mexico)
New York	Defunct^{[i]}	Beekman (Green Haven Correctional Facility)^{[j]}
North Carolina	Active	Raleigh (Central Prison)
Ohio	Active	Jefferson and Valley townships, Scioto County (Southern Ohio Correctional Facility)
Oklahoma	Active	McAlester (Oklahoma State Penitentiary)
Oregon	Defunct	Salem (Oregon State Penitentiary)
Pennsylvania	Defunct^{[k]}	Benner Township (State Correctional Institution – Rockview)
South Carolina	Active	Columbia (Broad River Correctional Institution)
South Dakota	Active	Sioux Falls (South Dakota State Penitentiary)
Tennessee	Active	Nashville (Riverbend Maximum Security Institution)
Texas	Active	Huntsville (Huntsville Unit)
Utah	Active	Salt Lake City (Utah State Correctional Facility)
Virginia	Defunct^{[l]}	Greensville County (Greensville Correctional Center)
Washington	Defunct^{[m]}	Walla Walla (Washington State Penitentiary)
Wyoming	Active	Rawlins (Wyoming State Penitentiary)^{[n]}

Notes:

^{a} According to Army Regulation (AR) 190-55, upon authorization from the President of the United States and with the recommendation of the provost marshal general, the Secretary of the Army will select the date, time, location and method of each execution.

^{b} Death penalty abolished in 2020. All remaining inmate's death sentences were commuted to life imprisonment by Gov. Jared Polis immediately upon abolition.

^{c} Death penalty abolished in 2012. All remaining inmates death sentences were commuted to life imprisonment by the Connecticut Supreme Court in 2015.

^{d} Death penalty abolished in 2011. All condemned prisoners sentences were commuted to life imprisonment by Gov. Pat Quinn immediately upon abolition.

^{e} Death penalty abolished in 2013. Remaining inmate's death sentences were commuted to life imprisonment by Gov. Martin O'Malley in 2014.

^{f} Death penalty abolished in 2019; one prisoner, Michael K. Addison, remains on death row under sentence of death.

^{g} Death penalty abolished in 2007. All remaining inmate's death sentences were commuted to life imprisonment by Gov. Jon Corzine immediately upon abolition.

^{h} Death penalty abolished in 2009. All remaining inmates death sentences were commuted to life imprisonment by the New Mexico Supreme Court in 2019.

^{i} Death penalty abolished in 2007. All remaining inmates death sentences were commuted to life imprisonment by the New York Court of Appeals immediately upon abolition.

^{j} Closed in 2008 under David Paterson's administration.

^{k} Prison housing execution chamber closed in March 2026, capital punishment statute still legal in Pennsylvania, but under moratorium.

^{l} Death penalty abolished in 2021. All remaining inmates death sentences were automatically commuted to life imprisonment under the abolition statute.

^{m} Death penalty abolished in 2018. All remaining inmates death sentences were commuted to life imprisonment by the Washington Supreme Court immediately upon abolition.

^{n} If an execution does occur, the state will use its parole board meeting room at the state prison.

== United Kingdom ==
In the United Kingdom, the execution chamber was part of a larger complex, often referred to as the "Execution Suite". The room, usually formed from two single prison cells, contained the large trapdoor, usually double-leaved, but in some older chambers such as at Oxford, single-leaved, and operating lever. The wooden beam from which the rope was suspended was usually set into the walls of the chamber above, with the floor removed. At Wandsworth Prison the floor was retained and holes allowed the rope and chains through. Oxford's chamber was of an old 19th-century type, and the beam was set into the walls of the chamber just above head height.

Such rooms were almost always built into one of the wings of a prison; following the recommendation of prison governors during the 1948 Royal Commission on capital punishment, further execution chambers were housed in purpose-built blocks separate from the main prison. The last gallows actually used in Britain, at Aberdeen Prison, was built in 1962 but was used only once, for the hanging of Henry John Burnett, the last person to be executed in Scotland. A freestanding execution block was built at Perth Prison in 1965, but remained unused. This was the last purpose-built gallows in the UK.

The last officially operational gallows in the United Kingdom (as several remained unofficially in other prisons), at Wandsworth Prison, was removed in 1994. Salvaged parts from it are in the possession of the National Justice Museum, having previously been at the HM Prison Service museum.

== Japan ==
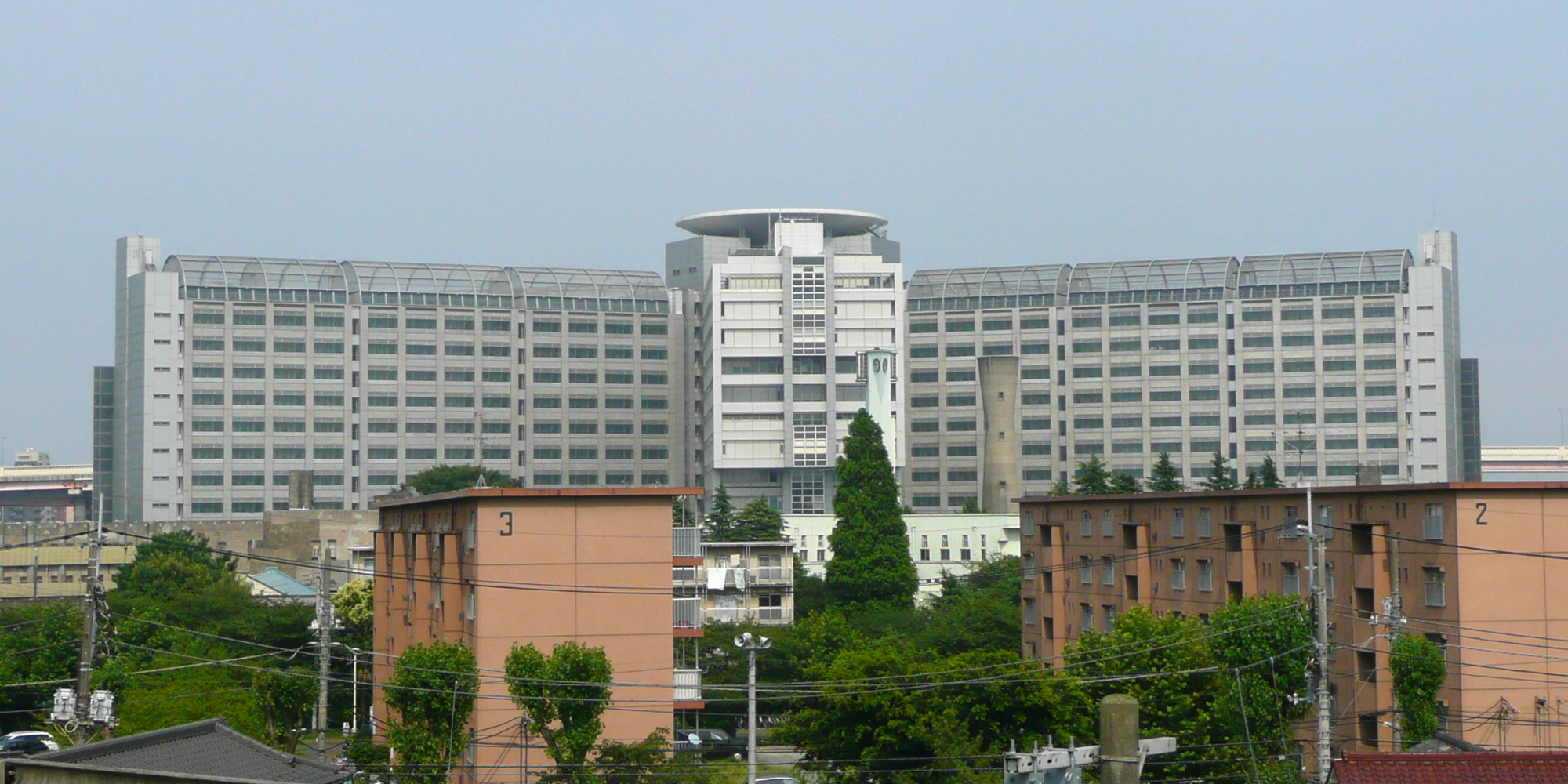
One of Japan's seven execution chambers is in the Tokyo Detention House

Japan has seven execution chambers, which are located at the Detention Houses in Tokyo, Nagoya, Osaka, Hiroshima, Fukuoka, Sendai and Sapporo. All executions in Japan are carried out by hanging. The execution chamber in Tokyo has a trap door. As the condemned is dropped, their body falls into a room below the execution chamber and the death is confirmed. In the Tokyo facility, the actual chamber is preceded by a room with a shrine to Amida Nyorai (Amitābha), a Buddhist deity, to allow for prayers and consultation with a religious official. The execution room in Tokyo is separated into two sections, with a total area of 25 m^{2}.

== Canada ==
In Canada, executions were usually carried out in the county/municipality jail where they were committed. Alberta had gallows for the entire province in Fort Saskatchewan and Lethbridge. British Columbia had their executions in Oakalla (Burnaby).

The Don Jail was for murders committed in The City of Toronto and County of York. The Ontario County Jail in Whitby which was used for murders committed to what is now Durham Region. Most hangings were carried out using temporary gallows built in the jail yard although a few jails had permanent indoor facilities.

== Gallery ==
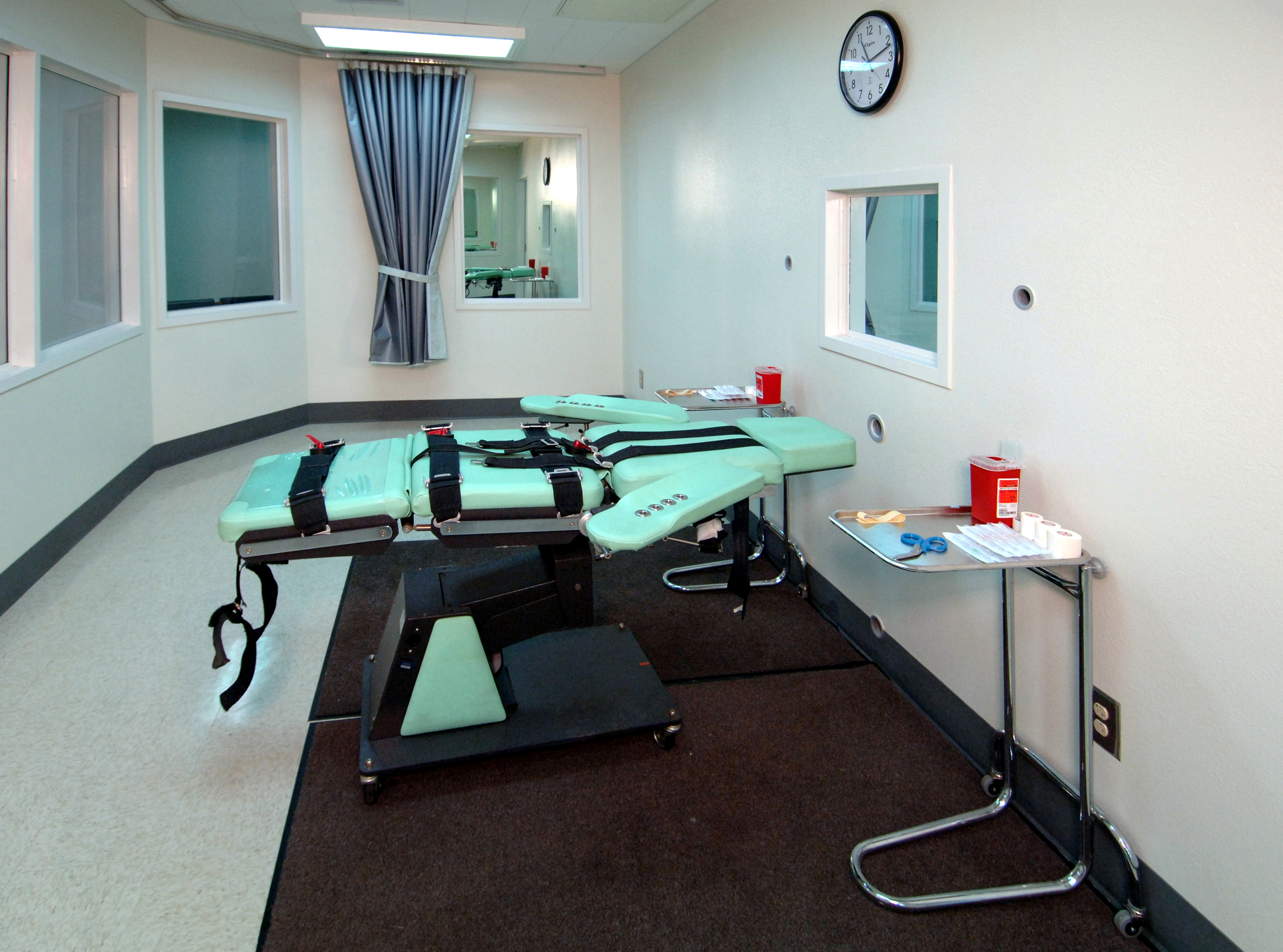
Execution chamber at San Quentin State Prison

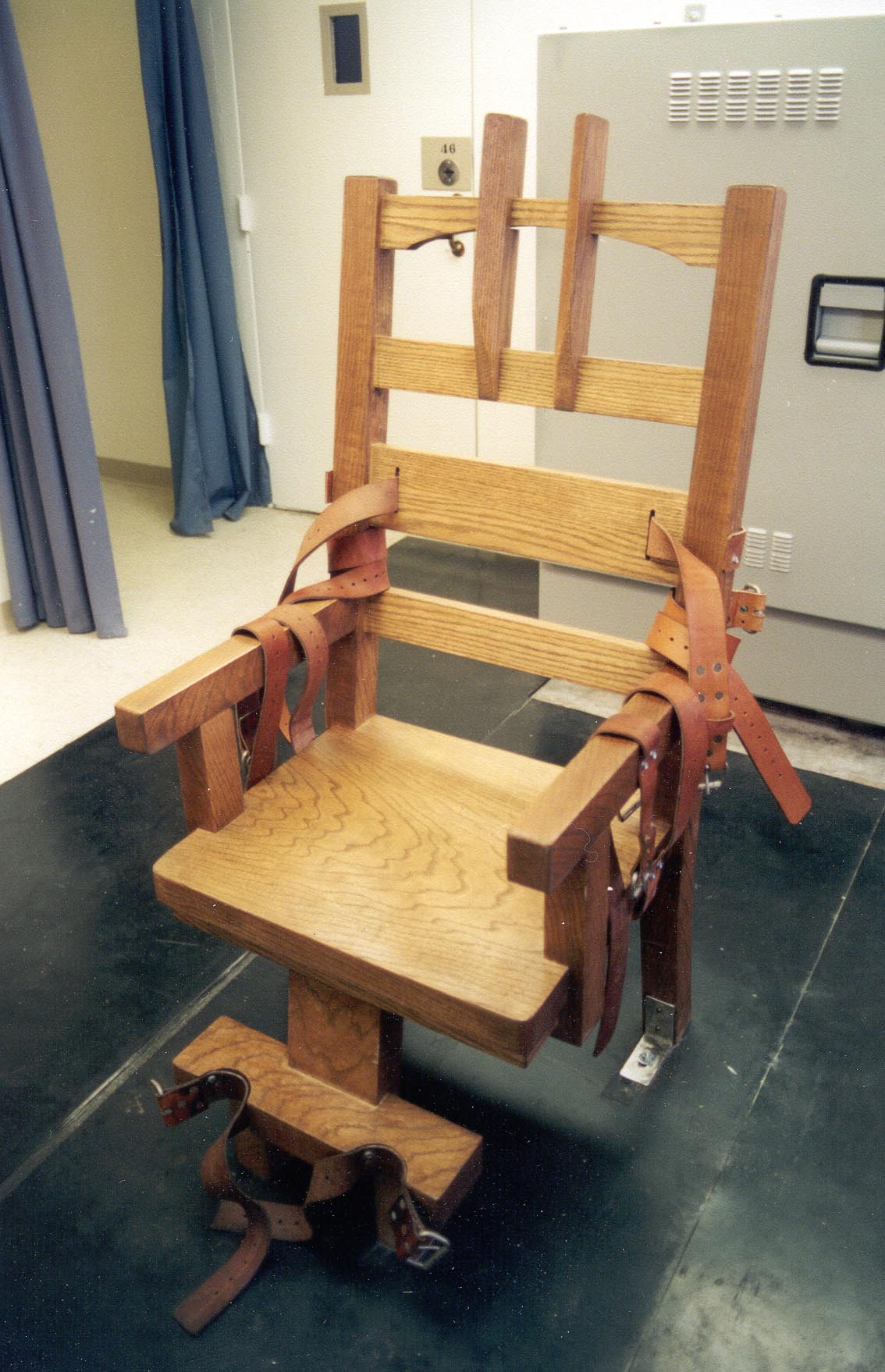
Execution chamber at Florida State Prison in 1999, set up for electrocution

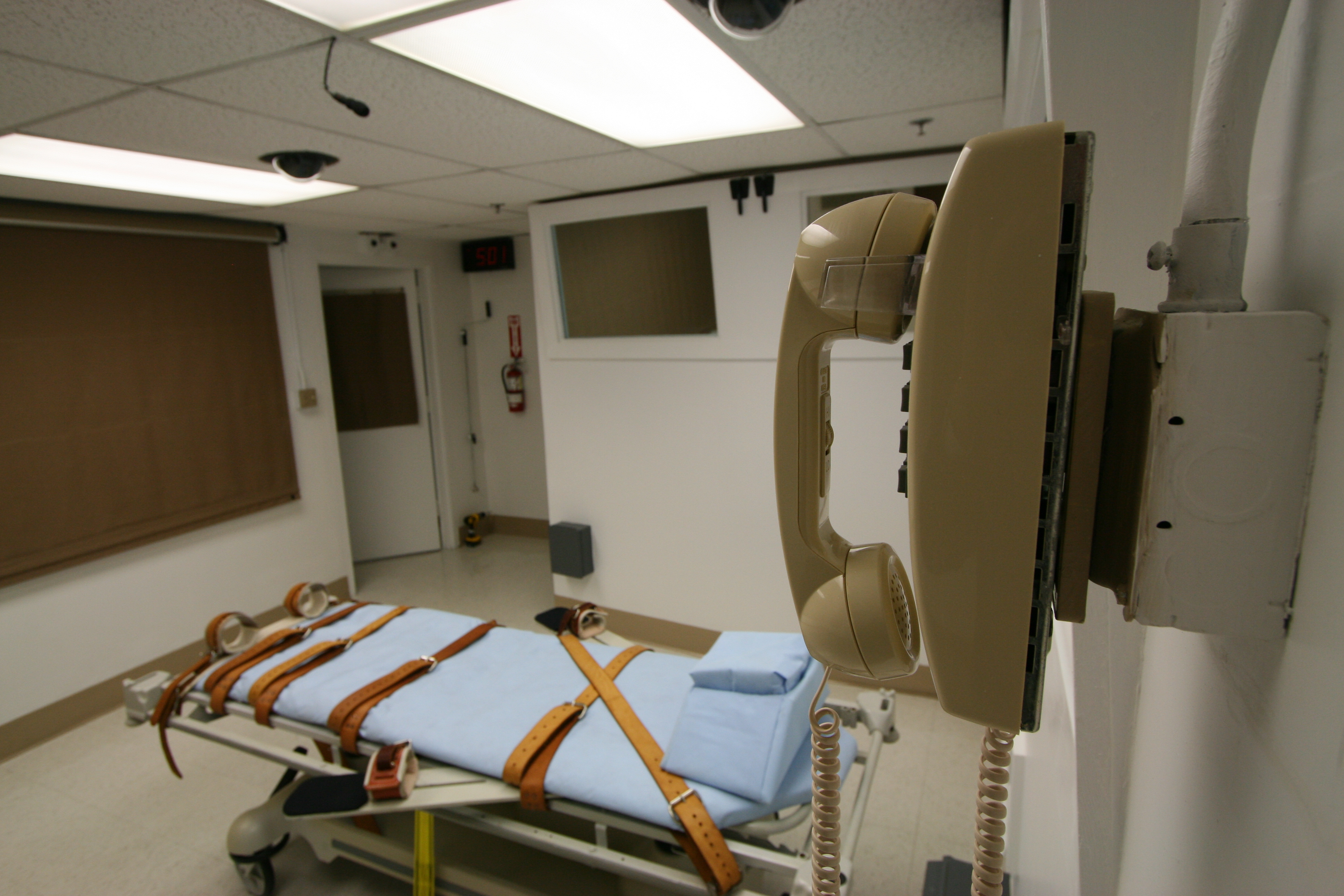
Same execution chamber at the Florida State Prison, post-1999, set up for lethal injection

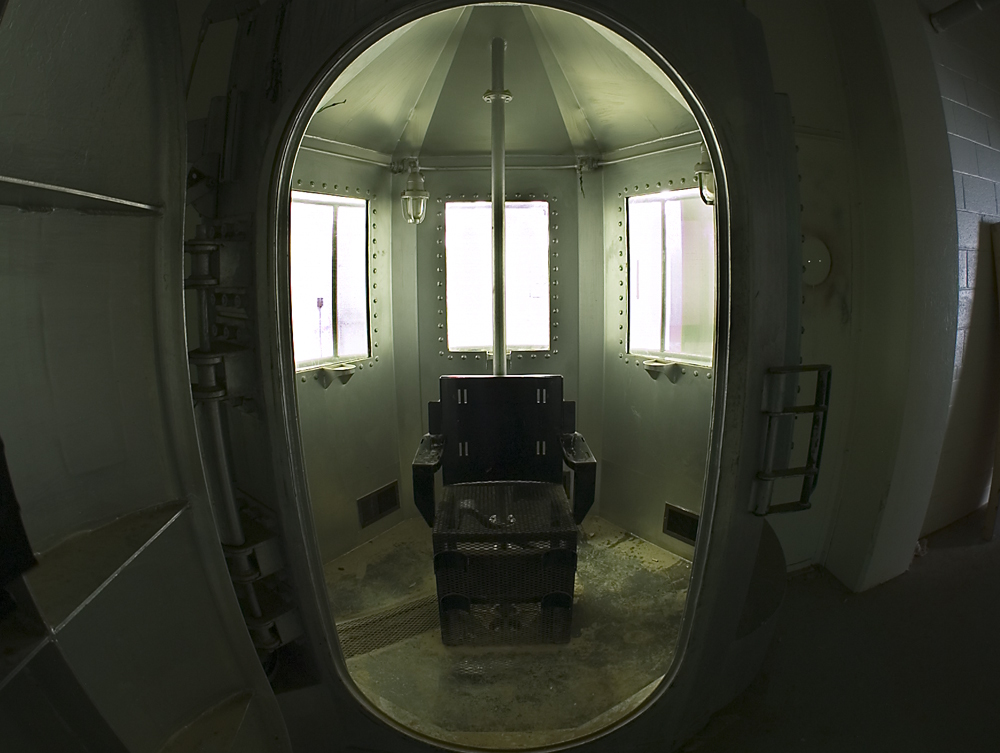
The gas chamber at Penitentiary of New Mexico

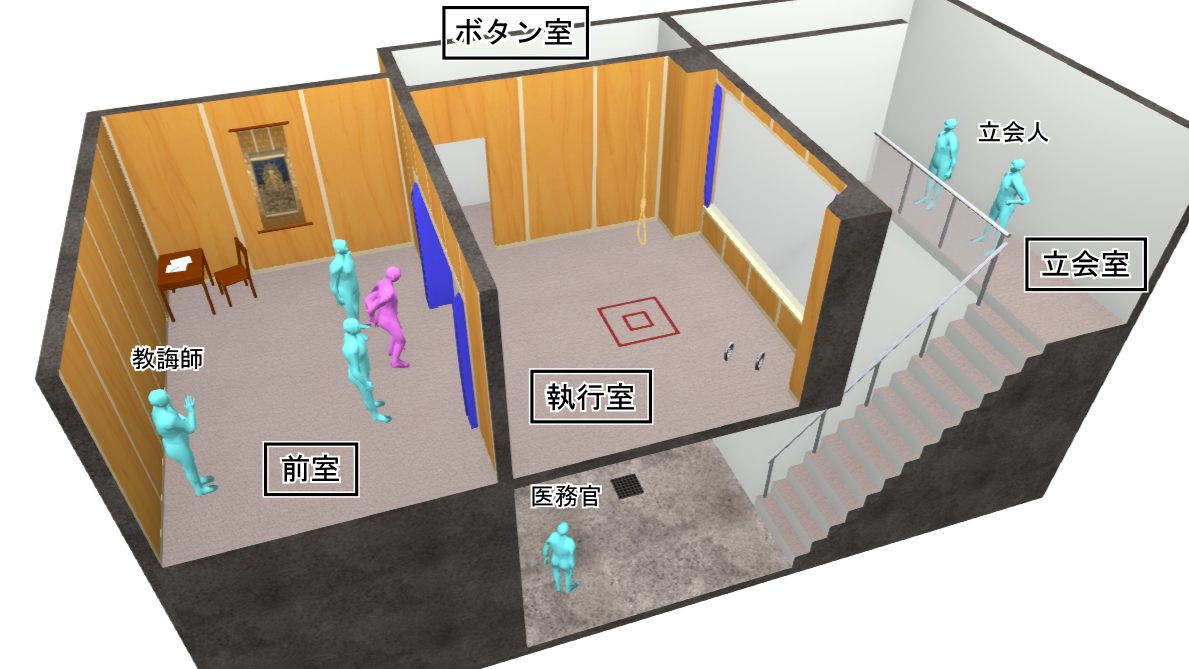
Diagram of the execution chamber at the Tokyo Detention House

== See also ==
- Capital punishment
