= Jesse Tafero =

American man convicted of murder (1946–1990)

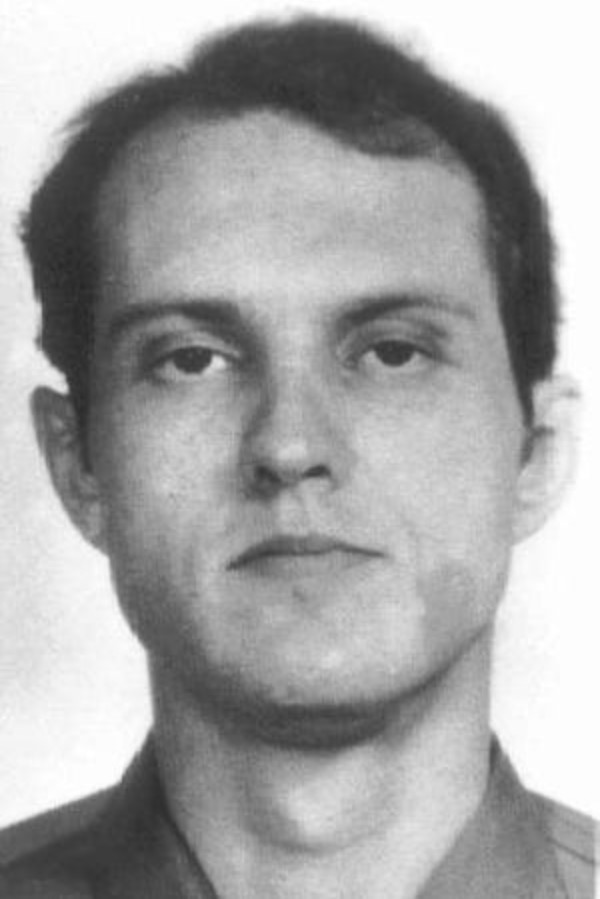
- Mug shot of Tafero
- Born: October 12, 1946; United States
- Died: May 4, 1990 (aged 43); Florida State Prison, Florida, U.S.
- Known for: Botched execution and controversial conviction
- Spouse: Sonia "Sunny" Jacobs
- Children: 2
- Status: Executed by electrocution
- Convictions: First degree murder (2 counts); Kidnapping; Assault with intent to commit rape Committing a crime against nature Robbery (2 counts); Burglary
- Penalty: Death

Jesse Joseph Tafero (October 12, 1946 – May 4, 1990) was an American man who was executed via electric chair in the U.S. state of Florida for the 1976 murders of 39-year-old Florida Highway Patrol officer Phillip A. Black and 39-year-old Ontario Provincial Police Corporal Donald Irwin, a visiting Canadian constable and friend of Black. The officers were killed during a traffic stop where Tafero, his wife Sunny Jacobs, and their children were passengers. Tafero's execution was botched; his head burst into flames during the execution by electric chair. Some believe Tafero to have been innocent of the murders, while others believe his guilt was clear.

== Earlier crimes ==
When Tafero was 20, he was convicted of attempted robbery and violating sodomy laws. At the time of the murders, he was on parole for a 1967 attempted rape conviction. On March 4, 1967, Philip Weinshenker entered an apartment and held two women hostage. He raped one of them and tied the other up, before calling for Tafero. Tafero arrived and attempted to rape the tied up woman, then forced the other woman to perform oral sex. The men held the women hostage for a total of eleven hours, before fleeing with a stolen shawl, a black leather coat, a Sheffield watch, costume jewelry, clothing, a hair dryer, and roughly $150.

Tafero was arrested a few days later and identified by both women. At trial, he was convicted of assault with intent to commit rape, committing a crime against nature, burglary, and robbery. He was sentenced to 25 years in prison, and was released on parole in 1974.

== Murders, trial, and execution ==
On the morning of February 20, 1976, Black and Irwin approached a car parked at a rest stop for a routine check. Tafero, his wife Sonia "Sunny" Jacobs, their two children (ages 9 years and 10 months) and Walter Rhodes were found asleep inside. Black saw a gun lying on the floor inside the car. He woke the occupants and first asked Rhodes then Tafero to come out of the car.

According to Rhodes, Tafero then shot both Black and Irwin with the gun (which was legally registered to Jacobs who bought guns on behalf of Tafero – he couldn't legally obtain a license because of his record) and led the others into the police car to flee the scene. According to Tafero, Rhodes shot the officers and handed the gun to him so that Rhodes could drive. Forensic evidence also indicated that a taser, which Jacobs had purchased months earlier, had been fired before the murders took place. The state argued that Sunny fired the taser, then the gun at Black, then Jesse grabbed the gun from and fired at both of them.

The trio later disposed of the police car and kidnapped a man and stole his car. All three were arrested after being caught in a roadblock. When they were arrested, the gun was found in Tafero's waistband. Gunpowder tests found residue on Rhodes consistent with "having discharged a weapon", residue on Tafero consistent with "handling an unclean or recently discharged weapon, or possibly discharging a weapon", as well as residue on Jacobs and her son consistent with "having handled an unclean or recently discharged weapon".

Rhodes entered into a plea agreement for a reduced sentence of second degree murder in exchange for his testimony against Tafero and Jacobs. At their trial, he testified that Jacobs had fired first from the back seat, then Tafero took the gun from her and shot the two officers. Rhodes later recanted his testimony on three occasions, in 1977, 1979, and 1982, stating that he shot the policemen. However, he ultimately reverted to his original testimony. A trucker who witnessed the murders testified that he believed the initial shots had come from the back seat, where Jacobs had been sitting.

Tafero's lawyers later argued that only Jacobs could have started the shooting:

"The entire incident might never have occurred if she had not fired the first shots."

Tafero and Jacobs were both convicted of first degree murder. The jury recommended a death sentence for Tafero and a life sentence for Jacobs. However, Judge Daniel Futch, known as "Maximum Dan" for his reputation for tough sentences, sentenced both of them to death. Rhodes was sentenced to three life terms. He was released in 1994 following parole for good behavior. Jacobs's children were placed in the care of her parents until the parents' deaths in the crash of Pan Am Flight 759 in 1982. The children were then separated and Sunny's younger child, Christina, was placed into foster care with a friend of Jacobs.

Tafero and Jacobs continued their relationship through letters while serving time in the prison. Because there was no death row for women in Florida, Jacobs was put into solitary confinement for the first five years of her imprisonment and let out only once or twice a week for exercise. She learned yoga to pass the time, and after being moved to the general prison population, began teaching yoga to other prisoners.

In 1981, the Florida Supreme Court reduced Jacobs's sentence to life in prison, holding that Futch lacked sufficient basis to override the jury's sentencing recommendation. Notably, unlike Tafero, Jacobs had no prior convictions.

Tafero was now to be executed by electrocution. The machine, dubbed "Old Sparky", malfunctioned, causing six-inch flames to shoot out of Tafero's head. A member of the execution team had used a synthetic sponge rather than a sea sponge, which is necessary to provide greater conductivity and a quick death. In all, three jolts of electricity were required to execute Tafero, a process that took seven minutes.

In August 2005, Rhodes returned to prison for a parole violation. As of 2025, he remains incarcerated at the Columbia Annex.

== Aftermath ==
The case became a cause célèbre among death penalty opponents, who cited the brutal circumstances of Tafero's execution as reasons it should be abolished. Filmmaker Micki Dickoff made a crime drama on the case entitled In the Blink of an Eye, which aired as an ABC Movie of the Week in 1996. Sunny Jacobs, even though she had not been exonerated, is featured in The Exonerated, a made-for-cable television film, first aired in 2005.

Ellen McGarrahan, who later wrote a book about the case, said advocates for Tafero and Jacobs had obscured the facts of the case by attempting to portray them as completely innocent. For example, The Exonerated ignored the fact that Tafero and not just Rhodes was a convicted felon on parole. As for Jacobs, she said that two eyewitnesses testified that Rhodes couldn't have been the shooter since his hands were in the air. Forensic evidence suggested that the taser shot had come from the back of the car. McGarrahan suggested that while Jacobs may not have fired any shots, she most likely at least fired the taser.

After approaching her in Ireland, Jacobs was wary on the subject of her involvement in the murders and refused to talk about the taser whatsoever. When McGarrahan said she simply wanted to establish the truth about the case, Jacobs gave evasive answers, saying the truth would never be known even though she was present for the murders.

"I don't think you can know that. I don't think that's knowable."

In 1992, Jacobs was granted a new trial after an appellate court found that prosecutors had withheld potentially exculpatory evidence from her defense. She later entered an Alford plea to two counts of second degree murder and was released on time served in October 1992. In 2011, Jacobs married Peter Pringle, who had been exonerated after being convicted of capital murder and sentenced to death in the Republic of Ireland. (Pringle's sentence was commuted to life imprisonment, the death penalty having been abolished in practice in Ireland since 1954, abolished for ordinary murder in 1964, and permanently abolished for all crimes in 1990.)

Sunny and Peter Pringle had founded The Sunny Centre where they helped other exonerees with their healing process. The centre is non-profit and gives individuals support upon leaving prison. The couple welcomed exonerees into their home and incorporated a holistic approach to healing through yoga, meditation and prayer.

Jacobs died at the age of 77 in a house fire in County Galway, Ireland in June 2025.

== See also ==
- Capital punishment debate in the United States
- List of people executed in Florida
- List of people executed in the United States in 1990

Executions carried out in Florida
| Preceded by Aubrey Dennis Adams Jr. May 4, 1989 | Jesse Tafero; May 4, 1990 | Succeeded by Anthony Bertolotti July 27, 1990 |
Executions carried out in the United States
| Preceded by Ronald Woomer – South Carolina April 27, 1990 | Jesse Tafero – Florida; May 4, 1990 | Succeeded by Winford Stokes – Missouri May 11, 1990 |
