= Terry Melvin Sims =

American murderer (1942–2000)

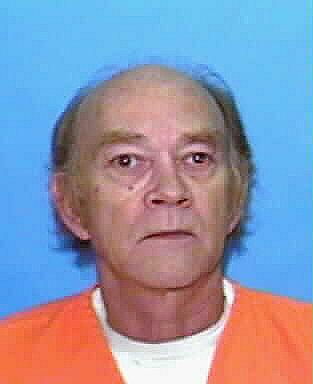
- Born: February 5, 1942; United States
- Died: February 23, 2000 (aged 58); Florida State Prison, Florida, U.S.
- Status: Executed by lethal injection
- Motive: To avoid arrest
- Conviction: First degree murder
- Penalty: Death

Details
- Victims: 1
- Date: December 29, 1977
- Country: United States
- State: Florida
- Date apprehended: June 25, 1978

Terry Melvin Sims (February 5, 1942 – February 23, 2000) was an American convicted murderer who was executed by the state of Florida for fatally shooting a sheriff's deputy in Longwood, Florida. He was the first Florida inmate executed with the use of lethal injection, after the previous execution, which was conducted under the electric chair, had been seriously botched.

== Crime ==
On December 29, 1977, Sims along with three accomplices, James "B.B." Halsell, Curtis Baldree, and Clarence Eugene Robinson, committed a robbery at the Longwood Village Pharmacy in Longwood, Florida. Sims and Baldree entered the building, while Halsell and Robinson waited in the getaway car. Baldree went toward the back of the store to rob the pharmacist, while Sims watched the front door. They ordered the customers to enter the bathroom.

At the same time, 57-year-old former U.S. Marine Corps marine and World War II veteran George Pfeil, a retired New York City officer and the Seminole County reserve deputy sheriff, entered the store. When he saw that the place was being robbed, Pfeil and Sims began exchanging gunfire at one another. Pfeil was shot twice, both wounds being fatal. Sims was shot once but managed to flee the scene. Sims fled the state of Florida not long after, taking refuge in California. There, in June 1978, he was arrested after a failed robbery.

== Trial ==
Sims was extradited to Florida to stand trial. At the trial, Halsell and Baldree testified that after Pfeil's murder, Sims bragged that he had "killed him with one bullet". Robinson was not present at the trial as he was not caught yet. In the end, Sims was found guilty of first degree murder and was sentenced to death. Baldree and Halsell were both convicted of their roles in the robbery and were both given two-year prison terms. Baldree and Halsell were eventually released, but were murdered in 1981 and 1982, respectively, allegedly by Robinson. Robinson's whereabouts were discovered and he was arrested on June 8, 1983, when he was identified for shooting and seriously wounding two FBI agents, Thomas Sobolewski and Dennis Wicklein, five days earlier. Robinson was never tried for murder due to insufficient evidence, but was convicted in federal court for these shootings and sentenced to 30 years in prison. Robinson was released from prison in 2005, but was sentenced to 9 years and seven months in prison in 2009 for drug and firearm charges. He was released again on February 7, 2024.

== Execution ==
In 1999, convicted killer Allen Lee Davis was put to the death by Florida by the routine method of the electric chair. During his execution, blood began rapidly pouring out of his nose, and witnesses reported that Davis was still alive after the electrocution stopped. The execution was considered by some to have been botched, and this prompted the United States Supreme Court to challenge the use of Florida's electric chair, temporarily halting all executions in the state. By this time, the vast majority of the other U.S. states had converted their execution method to lethal injection, prompting Florida to do the same.

Sims, who had spent over 20-years on death row, was scheduled to be executed on November 2, 1999. However, a judge awarded Sims a stay of execution, rescheduling it to February 23 the next year. A week before his scheduled execution, Sims challenged the use of lethal injection, but his appeals were denied. On February 23, Sims was executed with the injection method, becoming the first person to be executed with it in Florida. His final words were "I love my family. I love all my friends and my rabbi." Since his execution, all other executions in Florida have been performed by lethal injection, although inmates can still choose to be executed by the electric chair.

== See also ==
- List of people executed by lethal injection
- List of people executed in Florida
- List of people executed in the United States in 2000

Executions carried out in Florida
Preceded by Allen Lee Davis July 8, 1999	Terry Melvin Sims; February 23, 2000	Succeeded by Anthony Bryan February 24, 2000
Executions carried out in the United States
Preceded by Cornelius Goss – Texas February 23, 2000	Terry Melvin Sims – Florida; February 23, 2000	Succeeded by Anthony Bryan – Florida February 24, 2000
