= Thomas Harrison Provenzano =

American convicted murderer

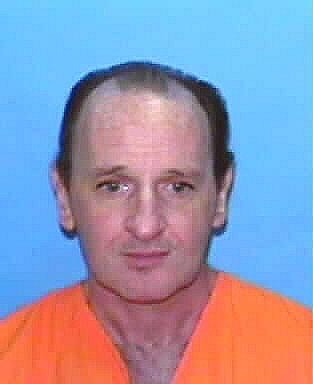
- Mugshot of Provenzano
- Born: June 6, 1949; United States
- Died: June 21, 2000 (aged 51); Florida State Prison, Florida, U.S.
- Occupation: Electrician
- Status: Executed by lethal injection
- Motive: Revenge
- Convictions: First degree murder Attempted first degree murder
- Penalty: Death

Details
- Victims: 3 (two of whom later died from their injuries)
- Date: January 10, 1984

Thomas Harrison Provenzano (June 6, 1949 – June 21, 2000) was a convicted murderer executed by lethal injection in Florida. Provenzano said he believed himself to be Jesus Christ and also compared his execution with Christ's crucifixion.

== Murders ==
Provenzano was a 34-year-old unemployed electrician when, on January 10, 1984, he entered the Orange County courthouse in Orlando carrying a shotgun, an assault rifle, and a revolver, along with a large quantity of ammunition. He opened fire with the revolver when two bailiffs approached to search him.

Provenzano had been charged with disorderly conduct five months earlier and had gone to the courthouse with the intention of shooting the officer who had charged him.

Instead, Provenzano killed 60-year-old Deputy Sheriff William Arnold "Arnie" Wilkerson, a retired Navy Lt. Commander who had served 15 years with the Sheriff's Department. In addition, 53-year-old Deputy Sheriff Harry Dalton was wounded and suffered brain damage, becoming partially paralyzed and eventually dying from his injuries in 1991.

Nineteen-year-old Correctional Officer Mark Parker was hit in the spine and paralyzed from the neck down after being caught in the crossfire as he used his own body to shield a civilian from the gunfire. Parker eventually died in March 2009 due to complications from his injuries. Provenzano would be found guilty and sentenced to death for the attack.

=== Victims ===
- Deputy Sheriff William Arnold "Arnie" Wilkerson had served in the U.S. Navy from 1942 to 1969, attaining the rank of lieutenant commander, and participated in World War II, the Korean War, and the Vietnam War. He had served 15 years with the Orange County Sheriff's Office. He was killed by a single gunshot wound to the head.
- Deputy Sheriff Harry Jordan Dalton Jr. had served in the U.S. Navy from 1950 to 1975, attaining the rank of Master chief petty officer, and participated in the Korean War and the Vietnam War. He had served 8 years with the Orange County Sheriff's Office. He died of his wounds on March 25, 1991, after being mortally wounded by a single gunshot wound to the head.
- Corrections Officer Mark Lindsey Parker had served one year with the Orange County Sheriff's Office. He died of his wounds on March 19, 2009, at age 44, having been shot in the spine and paralyzed from the neck down when caught in the crossfire as he used his own body to shield a civilian from the gunfire.

== Legal proceedings ==
In 1999, the state of Florida heard a petition from Provenzano that argued that the electric chair was a cruel and unusual punishment. During the proceedings, Michael Minerva, who had witnessed Jerry White's execution, said that "White's body stiffened and was thrust upward and backward to the back of the electric chair" after the current had been switched on.

He stated he heard air moving through White's lips and throat, though he could not tell whether the air was going in or out. But even after the execution by electric chair of Allen Lee Davis had caused many irregularities, the constitutionality of the electric chair remained upheld. However, by the time the inmate following Davis was to be executed, Florida inmates sentenced to death could choose between lethal injection and the electric chair.

Provenzano was originally scheduled to be the second person executed in Florida's newly built electric chair on July 14, 1999, but the execution was stayed following the gruesome death of Allen Lee Davis six days before. Provenzano's eventual execution was carried out using a lethal injection protocol subsequently adopted by the Florida state legislature. Provenzano had spent almost 16 years on death row before being executed at Florida State Prison in Starke on June 21, 2000. He was the 48th murderer executed in Florida since that state's reintroduction of the death penalty in 1976.

== See also ==
- Capital punishment in Florida
- Capital punishment in the United States
- List of people executed in Florida
- List of people executed in the United States in 2000
- List of people who have claimed to be Jesus
- Messiah complex

== Sources ==
- Inmate Release Information Detail – Inmate 094542. Florida Department of Corrections. Retrieved on January 18, 2021
- Execution List: 1976 - present. Florida Department of Corrections. Retrieved on 2026-05-22.
- Clarence T. Johnson Jr. (Senior Circuit Judge). Order Upholding Constitutionality of the Electric Chair. Florida Department of Corrections (1999-08-03). Retrieved on 2007-08-13.
- Scott Talan.. Capitol News Service. (2000-06-22). Archived from the original on 2002-06-26. Retrieved on 2007-08-13.
- Killer Who Said He Was Jesus Is Executed. CBS News (June 21, 2000). Retrieved on January 18, 2021.
- Fisher, Lise; Hutchens, George (June 22, 2000). "Convicted murderer executed". The Gainesville Sun. Archived from the original on July 11, 2000.
- Christopher Goffard. Paralyzed victim to view execution. St. Petersburg Times (2000-06-20). Retrieved on 2007-08-13.
- Christopher Goffard. Execution halted. St. Petersburg Times (2000-06-21). Retrieved on 2007-08-13.
- Thomas Harrison Provensano. The Clark County Prosecuting Attorney. Retrieved on 2007-08-13.
