= Allen Lee Davis =

American murderer (1944–1999)

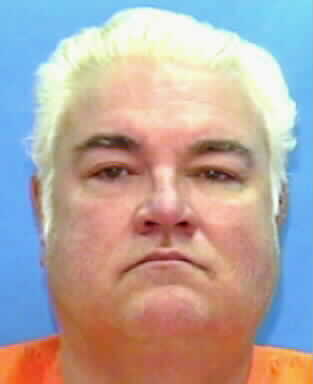
- Mugshot of Davis
- Born: July 20, 1944; Millinocket, Maine, U.S.
- Died: July 8, 1999 (aged 54); Florida State Prison, Florida, U.S.
- Other names: Tiny, Bud
- Occupation: Welder
- Height: 5 ft 10 in (178 cm)
- Status: Executed by electrocution
- Motive: Pedophilia, rape, robbery
- Convictions: Federal; Involuntary manslaughter Florida; First degree murder (3 counts) (1982); Robbery (2 counts) (1973); Attempted robbery (1973)
- Penalty: Federal; 3 years imprisonment Florida; 15 years imprisonment (1973); Death (1982)

Details
- Span of crimes: 1965–1982
- Country: United States
- State: Florida
- Killed: 6 (including an unborn baby and two killed in a drunk driving incident)
- Date apprehended: 1982

Allen Lee Davis (July 20, 1944 – July 8, 1999) was an American convicted murderer who was executed for the 1982 murder of Nancy Weiler, who was three months pregnant, and her daughters, 9-year-old Kristina and 5-year-old Katherine, in Jacksonville, Florida.

Davis was executed on July 8, 1999, via electrocution. His execution was alleged to have been botched, with witnesses reporting that Davis was still alive after the power to Old Sparky was switched off. Blood had also leaked from Davis's nose during the execution, although prison officials alleged this was caused by a nose bleed.

Because of the controversy surrounding his execution, Davis remains the last person executed by electric chair in Florida. All subsequent executions in Florida have been carried out by lethal injection, though inmates can still choose to be executed by electric chair.

== Early life ==
Davis was born in Millinocket, Maine, into a poor and uneducated family, and came from an abusive home. According to Davis's brother, his uncle reportedly molested him as a child, and later went to prison for molesting another child. Davis himself said he had been repeatedly molested by relatives of his stepfather.

== Earlier crimes ==
While at a hospital in Maryland in the 1960s, Davis admitted to molesting a number of young children. As a juvenile, he was charged with fondling an 11-year-old girl and sent to the State Reformatory for Men in Maine.

Davis's manslaughter conviction stemmed from a car accident that occurred on April 21, 1965. He was put in a hospital for a month with serious injuries. Two of his friends who were in the car with him died in the accident. After Allen said that he had taken a shot for weight control and had drunk several beers prior to the accident, he was charged with involuntary manslaughter. The case was heard in federal court since the accident occurred on federal property. Davis was found guilty and sentenced to three years in prison. He served his sentence at the Federal Correctional Institution in Petersburg, Virginia. He began his sentence on January 13, 1967. Described as a model inmate, he was paroled on November 12, 1968.

On August 6, 1973, Davis robbed a man at gunpoint. The man was a service station employee who was attempting to make a bank deposit, and Davis robbed him of a total of at least $3,700 USD (equivalent to over $27,000 in 2026). The robbery victim picked Davis out of a police lineup. Several weeks later, an informant found Davis loitering "suspicious[ly]" around a restaurant that had just closed and alerted the police, after which Davis was arrested and charged with armed robbery, attempted robbery, and illegal use of a firearm from the August 6 case. In early October, Davis pleaded guilty to the robbery charges; he was sentenced to 15 years in prison and released on parole after serving eight years of his sentence. He was still on parole at the time of the 1982 murders.

== Murders of the Weilers ==
Davis's father Donald lived in Jacksonville, Florida, and was the next-door neighbor of the Weilers, consisting of John, Nancy, and their two children, 9-year-old Kristina "Kristy" Leigh and 5-year-old Katherine "Kathy" Rene. At the time of the murders, John Weiler was in Pittsburgh, Pennsylvania, due to a job transfer. His wife and kids planned to follow him and move to Pittsburgh that summer before they were murdered; they remained in their Jacksonville house as they awaited its sale. Donald Davis and his wife (Davis's mother) were out bowling on the night of the murders; he and his wife had a good relationship with the Weilers, with newspapers reporting after Davis's conviction that Kristina and Katherine had brought Davis's mother a custom card for Mother's Day a few days prior to their deaths. The murders also took place shortly before Kristina's tenth birthday.

On the afternoon of May 11, 1982, Davis asked a friend for a ride to his parents' house. That friend later testified for the prosecution at Davis's murder trial, stating in court that Davis wanted to go to his parents' house that day so he could rob a house in their affluent neighborhood.

Between 7:30 PM and 9:00 PM on May 11, 1982, Davis grabbed his father's .357 Magnum pistol, which was sitting atop a refrigerator in his father's home, and brought it with him as he visited the Weiler household. He was able to get in without forced entry. A detective testified at his trial on behalf of the prosecution that Davis may have gained entry because Kristina may have asked him to repair a broken bathroom door in the Weiler home; Davis had done handiwork for the family before. According to the findings of a police investigation, the victims' autopsies, and Davis's own statements to his attorney, Nancy Weiler, who was in the home's kitchen preparing dinner, was startled to see him and asked him to leave the house, at which point Davis said "something snapped." Davis ordered Nancy and the girls into a bedroom, where he pistol-whipped Nancy over 25 times in the head and face while Kristina and Katherine watched, screamed, and cried. The beating was so harsh, that parts of the gun broke during the beating, but the gun was still able to fire. Davis tied Kristina's hands behind her back and shot her twice in the face, at which point Katherine ran away, and Davis shot her in the back. Davis stole jewelry and a 35mm Nikon camera before leaving the house. After the murders, Davis called the friend who had dropped him off at his parents' house and asked for another ride. The friend later testified that Davis was holding a paper bag with a Nikon camera inside and that Davis had admitted to stealing the camera from a local house.

Davis later admitted that his initial motive was to rape and murder Kristina, kill Katherine and Nancy, and then ransack the house. A neighbor requested a welfare check for the Weilers the next day; that neighbor procured a key and led a police officer into the house, where the two discovered the victims' bodies. All three victims were buried at the Saint John the Baptist Catholic Church Cemetery in Brusly, Louisiana.

== Investigation and arrest ==
The day after the murders, after the bodies were discovered and wheeled out of the Weiler household on a stretcher, Davis spoke to investigators outside the home. Three witnesses placed Davis near their home on the night of the murders, and one said he appeared to have been carrying a gun. Davis's father also told police his gun had gone missing the day after the Weilers' murders. Donald Davis provided police with a box of ammunition, and the bullets in the box matched the bullet fragments found in the Weiler house. Davis had rope in his truck that was identical to the rope with which he bound Kristina's hands. Davis was arrested, and by May 13, 1982, authorities had charged him with three counts of murder.

== Trial and subsequent developments ==
After Davis's request for a change of venue was denied, his trial commenced in Jacksonville, with jury selection beginning on January 31, 1983, and the trial taking place from February 1 to February 4, 1983. The jury convicted Davis of three counts of first degree murder and recommended the death penalty for all three counts.

Nancy Weiler's husband, John Weiler, would later describe Davis as a "deviant animal that should have been permanently caged or executed many years before May 1982." After Davis was sent to death row, John Weiler sued Davis's parents and their insurance company, alleging that they should have known their son was violent and should never have been able to use their home as a stakeout location to target the Weilers. John Weiler was 55 years old at the time Davis was executed, and he witnessed the execution. In a subsequent news conference, Weiler said Davis recognized him but "didn't show an ounce of remorse."

== Execution ==
=== Last meal ===
On July 8, 1999, Davis was electrocuted. For his last meal, Davis requested and received a dinner consisting of one lobster tail, fried potatoes, a half pound of fried shrimp, six ounces of fried clams, half a loaf of garlic bread, and 32 US fluid ounces (950 ml) of A&W Root Beer.

=== Electrical parameters ===
According to the licensed electrical engineer who managed the equipment, the amount of electrical energy applied to Davis in three steps was:

1. 1,500 Volts, 10 Amperes, 150 Ohms, for 8 seconds (power = 15.0 kW, energy = 120 kJ)
2. 600 Volts, 4.5 Amperes, 133 Ohms, for 22 seconds (power = 2.7 kW, energy = 59.4 kJ)
3. 1,500 Volts, 10 Amperes, 150 Ohms, for 8 seconds (power = 15.0 kW, energy = 120 kJ)

The maximum power was 15.0 kW, which is approximately equal to 11.2 hp. For comparison, the maximum output of a standard U.S. 15-Amp electrical outlet is 1.8 kW or 1.3 hp.

The total energy used was 299.4 kJ or 284 BTU, over a period of 38 seconds.

A BTU is defined as the amount of energy required to raise the temperature of one pound of water by one degree Fahrenheit. Davis weighed 350 pounds. 284 BTU is the amount of heat needed to raise 350 pounds of water 0.8 degrees Fahrenheit. An average male body contains about 58 ± 8% water.

=== Controversy ===
Davis's execution gained nationwide media attention after he bled profusely from the nose while being electrocuted. Also during his time in the electric chair, Davis suffered burns to his head, leg, and groin area.

A subsequent investigation concluded that Davis had begun bleeding before any electricity was applied. He had been taking blood thinning medication for an unrelated health problem. It was concluded that the electric chair had functioned as designed, and the Florida Supreme Court upheld electrocution as a means of capital punishment. However, a dissenting justice published photos of the aftermath of the incident in an attempt to argue that the practice of capital punishment by electrocution was outdated, and that any future executions should be carried out through lethal injection. Furthermore, appellate attorney Marty McClain, who had represented Davis while Davis filed appeals on death row, analyzed the results from a second, independent autopsy requested by Thomas Harrison Provenzano, another death row inmate who had initially been scheduled to die in the electric chair soon after Davis, and Provenzano's attorneys. McClain observed that Davis's body sustained fewer burns than the bodies of other inmates electrocuted in Florida, but that his brain was hardly damaged by the electricity: "There was no evidence that his brain was cooked. That means the brain was more likely to be functioning. That would be consistent with evidence of breathing [after the electrocution]."

In 1999, the state of Florida heard a petition from Provenzano in which Provenzano argued that the electric chair was a "cruel and unusual punishment", with Davis' execution cited as an example of an inhumane death.

As of 2024, Davis was the last Florida inmate executed by electric chair. Since the 2000 execution of Terry Melvin Sims, all subsequent executions were by lethal injection, and lethal injection is Florida's primary method of execution. However, inmates may still choose electrocution. As of 2024, only Wayne C. Doty has expressed wanting to die by electrocution; Doty is still alive, and his execution date has yet to be set.

=== Aftermath ===
The Florida Department of Corrections placed Davis's body in his brother's custody. His brother Richard scheduled Davis's body to be cremated on July 14, 1999, but his cremation was postponed from that date due to Provenzano requesting an independent autopsy on Davis.

== See also ==
- Capital punishment in Florida
- Capital punishment in the United States
- List of botched executions
- List of people executed in Florida
- List of people executed in the United States in 1999

Executions carried out in Florida
Preceded by Daniel Remeta March 31, 1998	Allen Lee Davis; July 8, 1999	Succeeded by Terry Melvin Sims February 23, 2000
Executions carried out in the United States
Preceded by Norman Newsted – Oklahoma July 8, 1999	Allen Lee Davis – Florida; July 8, 1999	Succeeded by Tommy Strickler – Virginia July 21, 1999
