= Larry Roy =

American convicted double killer on death row in Louisiana (born 1960)

- 1993 photograph of Larry Roy
- Born: November 20, 1960 (age 65); Louisiana, U.S.
- Status: Incarcerated on death row in Louisiana
- Conviction: First-degree murder (x2)
- Penalty: Death (x2)

Details
- Date: May 3, 1993
- Location: Louisiana
- Killed: Freddie Richard Jr., 33; Rosetta Silas, 75
- Injured: Sally Richard, age unknown David Richard, 10; Frederick Richard, 8
- Imprisoned at: Louisiana State Penitentiary

Larry Roy (born November 20, 1960) is an American convicted murderer sentenced to death in Louisiana for the 1993 double murder of Freddie Richard Jr. and Rosetta Silas in Cheneyville. Dubbed the "Cheneyville Slasher" by the media, Roy had broken into the home of his former girlfriend (Richard's former wife) on May 3, 1993, and he murdered both Richard and Silas (who was the aunt of Richard's ex-wife) by slashing and stabbing them to death; Roy's ex-girlfriend and her two sons were injured in the same attack. Roy was found guilty of both counts of first-degree murder and sentenced to death on July 19, 1994, and he is currently incarcerated on death row at the Louisiana State Penitentiary.

== 1993 Cheneyville slashings ==
On May 3, 1993, in Cheneyville, Louisiana, Larry Roy, then 32 years old, initiated a slashing attack that resulted in the deaths of two people and the wounding of three others.

Before this incident, Roy had a relationship with a woman named Sally Richard, who was formerly married with two sons, 10-year-old David and 8-year-old Frederick. In the past, Roy had cohabited with his then girlfriend and her children. However, after reconciling with her ex-husband Freddie Richard Jr., Sally ended her relationship with Roy.

Aggrieved at the break-up, Roy broke into the house of his ex-girlfriend, and entered her bedroom, where the couple slept with their two sons. Roy first attacked 33-year-old Freddie Richard Jr. and knifed him to death, and forced Sally to come with him and ordered her sons to lay down on the floor in the hall outside of the bedroom. Subsequently, Roy demanded Silas to hand him money, and he only received $50.

After taking the money, Roy tied up Sally and her two sons and slit their throats with a butcher knife, and afterwards, Roy went into the bedroom of Silas, where he subsequently stabbed 75-year-old Rosetta Silas to death. Sally and the boys managed to survive their wounds and successfully escaped from the house to call the police. As for Roy, he fled the house right after murdering Silas, whose body was left behind in her bedroom.

== Trial and sentencing ==
After the Cheneyville slashings, a police manhunt was initiated to capture Larry Roy, who was located in Bunkie two days later and taken into police custody. After his arrest, Larry Roy, who was dubbed the "Cheneyville Slasher" by the Louisiana newspapers, was charged with two counts of first-degree murder, an offence that warrants the death penalty under Louisiana state law if found guilty.

Subsequently, Roy stood trial before a Rapides Parish jury for the murders of Rosetta Silas and Freddie Richard Jr. in July 1994, and the prosecution sought the death penalty for Roy. In his defence, Roy stated that on the day before the murders, he had consumed several beers and a half pint of gin and he also took cocaine, and claimed that he was intoxicated by drugs and alcohol, and he could not remember his whereabouts or activities during the next few days leading up to the murders. He denied that he broke into the home of the Richards or slashed any of the five victims, much less killing two of the five victims.

On July 19, 1994, after a trial lasting five days, Roy was found guilty of first-degree murder on both counts by the jury. Two days later, the same jury unanimously recommended the death penalty for Roy. The verdict of death in Roy's case marked the first time where an all-White jury sentenced an African-American man to death for a Black-on-Black capital crime, although it was reported that race was not an issue in Roy's trial.

On August 30, 1994, Roy was formally sentenced to death by the 9th Judicial District Court Judge Alfred Mansour in accordance to the jury's recommendation.

The Cheneyville slashing case was one of the most heinous crimes to be heard in court during the year 1994.

== Appeals and clemency bid ==
In March 1996, two years after he was condemned to death row, Larry Roy filed an appeal to the Louisiana Supreme Court against his murder conviction and death sentence, and the first hearing for oral arguments was set on April 9, 1996. On October 4, 1996, the Louisiana Supreme Court dismissed Roy's appeal.

In March 1997, Roy appealed to the U.S. Supreme Court, seeking to overturn his murder convictions. On April 22, 1997, the U.S. Supreme Court rejected Roy's appeal. Afterwards, an execution date was set for Roy, whose death sentence was scheduled to be carried out on October 22, 1997, but the execution date was staved off for legal reasons. An indefinite stay of execution was later granted in July 1998.

In May 1999, Roy applied for a new trial in his case. In August 1999, Roy lodged another appeal to revoke his death sentence. By April 2000, Roy was still in the process of appealing his death sentence, which made it unlikely that he would be executed in the near future.

On April 11, 2002, Roy filed another appeal and it was set for hearing on October 7, 2002. However, by 2023, Roy's death sentence remained in place.

In 2023, Louisiana Governor John Bel Edwards, nearing the end of his term, publicly declared for the first time his opposition to the death penalty and his advocacy for its abolition in the state. However, on May 24, 2023, the Louisiana legislature voted against a bill that would have ended capital punishment in the state. In June 2023, a month later, except for one condemned prisoner, Larry Roy and the remaining 55 death row inmates filed clemency petitions in hopes of having their death sentences commuted to life imprisonment by Edwards before the end of his term as governor. These petitions were subsequently reviewed by the Louisiana Board of Pardons and Committee on Parole.

In July 2023, however, the Board rejected all 56 clemency petitions, ruling that the inmates were ineligible due to the timing of their filings, as they had been submitted too soon after recent judicial rulings on appeals (clemency petitions could only be filed at least one year after the final appeal ruling). In October 2023, the Board also denied further clemency requests from five death row inmates, including Antoinette Frank.

Meanwhile, Roy's clemency hearing was set to commence on November 8, 2023. Roy's then girlfriend Sally Richard, who survived the same attack that took her ex-husband's life, expressed her fear at the possibility of the commutation of Roy's death sentence, and stated that Roy deserved to be executed.

On November 8, 2023, Roy's application for a clemency hearing was denied.

== 2025 execution stay ==
In March 2024, after Edwards' term ended, his successor, Governor Jeff Landry, signed a bill into law that authorized nitrogen hypoxia and the electric chair as alternative execution methods, in addition to lethal injection as the primary execution method. This legislation followed the 2024 execution of Kenneth Eugene Smith in Alabama, the first execution by nitrogen hypoxia in the United States and globally. Louisiana had observed a 14-year moratorium on executions since the last state execution of Gerald Bordelon, who was convicted of raping and killing his stepdaughter, in 2010, due to challenges in acquiring lethal injection drugs and the refusal of pharmaceutical companies to supply them for execution purposes. Family members of victims of murder, whose killers remained on death row, expressed support for the bill allowing the alternative methods of execution, which also foresaw the possibility of carrying out the executions of Roy and 56 others on Louisiana's death row.

In April 2024, the only adult survivor of the Cheneyville slashings, Sally Richard, made a response to a bill seeking to remove the execution method of nitrogen hypoxia, stating that she wanted Roy to remain on death row and ultimately executed for the murder of her late ex-husband, although a lawmaker later replied and assured Richard that the bill would not outlaw capital punishment in the state or ban the other execution methods of lethal injection or the electric chair. Ultimately, nitrogen hypoxia remained on the books as an alternative method of execution in Louisiana due to the bill's rejection in May 2024.

In early February 2025, Louisiana Attorney General Liz Murrill announced that the state would resume executions using the newly adopted method of nitrogen hypoxia, which had been first implemented by Alabama to execute four prisoners between January 2024 and February 2025. Louisiana Governor Jeff Landry also supported the decision to resume executions, emphasizing the state's commitment to delivering justice to crime victims after a lengthy delay. Roy was among the first batch of condemned inmates selected for execution.

On February 10, 2025, Rapides Parish District Attorney Phillip Terrell petitioned to the courts of Louisiana for a death warrant for Roy. 9th Judicial District Court Judge Chris Hazel signed the death warrant and Roy's execution was ordered to be carried out on March 19, 2025.

The death warrant of Roy was the first out of the three execution orders to be issued in Louisiana that same month. On February 12, 2025, Judge Amy Burford McCartney signed a death warrant for another death row inmate named Christopher Sepulvado, scheduling his execution for March 17, 2025, two days before the execution date of Roy. Sepulvado was sentenced to death for the 1992 abuse and murder of his stepson. Additionally, Jessie Hoffman Jr., convicted of the 1996 rape-murder of Mary Elliot, was the third inmate to be scheduled for execution on March 18, 2025, just a day after Sepulvado's. Ultimately, Hoffman was executed as scheduled, therefore ending the 15-year moratorium on Louisiana's executions.

Shortly after his execution date was set, Roy's lawyers filed an appeal and argued that Roy had not fully exhausted his legal appeals against the death sentence. As a result, Roy's execution warrant was cancelled by Judge Chris Hazel, who originally signed the death warrant. A second petition was submitted by Terrell to reset the execution date of Roy, but it was rejected.

== Other developments and current status ==
A court hearing was held on May 13, 2025, to hear a new post-conviction petition from Roy, and during the hearing itself, one of the surviving victims of Roy tried to attack his mother's killer while the defence was in the midst of arguing against the death sentence. In light of the attempted attack, Rapides District Attorney Phillip Terrell said that his office would continue to ensure that Roy face the punishment he deserved for his crime, and Louisiana Attorney-General Liz Murrill also stated that it was "appalling" for the victims of the Cheneyville slashings to keep waiting for justice, and added that "the delay in carrying out the penalty in these cases is a travesty and torture for victims and their families".

Less than a week after the incident, the surviving victims of the Cheneyville attack appeared before the Louisiana State Capitol, testifying in support of a bill that aimed to reduce the duration and fast-track the conclusion of the post-conviction court process and its system.

As of 2025, Roy remains on death row at the Louisiana State Penitentiary.

== See also ==
- Capital punishment in Louisiana
- List of death row inmates in the United States § Louisiana
