= Christopher Sepulvado =

American convicted murderer (1943–2025)

- Born: November 11, 1943; Louisiana, U.S.
- Died: February 22, 2025 (aged 81); Louisiana State Penitentiary, West Feliciana Parish, Louisiana, U.S.
- Status: Deceased
- Conviction: First degree murder
- Penalty: Death

Details
- Victims: Wesley Allen Mercer, 6
- Date: March 8, 1992
- Location: Louisiana
- Imprisoned at: Louisiana State Penitentiary

Christopher Sepulvado (November 11, 1943 – February 22, 2025) was an American convicted murderer who was sentenced to death in Louisiana for the 1992 murder of his six-year-old stepson, Wesley Allen Mercer, who was beaten with a screwdriver and scalded to death. Sepulvado, the oldest inmate on Louisiana's death row, was originally set to be executed by nitrogen hypoxia on March 17, 2025. However, he died of natural causes less than two weeks after receiving his execution order.

== Murder of Wesley Allen Mercer ==
On March 8, 1992, in Mansfield, Louisiana, Christopher Sepulvado abused and murdered his six-year-old stepson, Wesley Allen Mercer (October 6, 1985 – March 8, 1992), by assault and scalding.

=== Background and abuse of Mercer ===
In September 1990, Sepulvado first dated Mercer's mother, Yvonne Mercer, who was separated from her first husband at that time. Mercer, then four years old, initially lived with Yvonne and her parents. In January 1991, despite her family's objections, Yvonne and Mercer moved to Mansfield to live with Sepulvado. Soon after, Sepulvado began drinking heavily and physically abusing Yvonne. On May 10, 1991, Yvonne left him and returned to her parents' home. Between late May and early July 1991, Yvonne moved back in with Sepulvado, leaving her son with her mother. However, after another incident of abuse, she left him again and returned to her parents' house. After a short stay with her parents, the defendant returned to Sepulvado, this time taking Mercer with her. It was then that Sepulvado began abusing Wesley instead of Yvonne, with the abuse gradually escalating in both physical and verbal forms.

Three days before the murder, on March 5, 1992, Sepulvado married the mother of his stepson. Merely a day after the marriage, Mercer was subjected to mistreatment and abuse from both his mother and stepfather for the next two days before he was killed. On March 6, 1992, Mercer returned from school and he defecated his pants thrice. Mercer's mother did not allow her son to have supper and also spanked him, while for Sepulvado, on the first occasion Mercer defecated in his pants, he tied a noose to a ceiling fan and threatened to hang Mercer by the neck, and even told Mercer to count while standing on the chair with one foot. Sepulvado also used a belt to whip Mercer and also shoved the boy's head into a toilet bowl during the second and third time when Mercer defecated in his shorts.

On March 7, 1992, Mercer was starved for another day after Sepulvado instructed his wife to not feed her son, and Mercer was hit by his mother and got his hair pulled, and the couple forced Mercer to sleep on a small trunk.

=== Mercer's death ===
On the morning of March 8, 1992, Mercer was kicked into the bathroom by Sepulvado, who threatened to scald him with hot water if he again defecated in his pants, and that same morning, Mercer was told to dress and clean up before going to church, but as the boy hesitated, Sepulvado whacked Mercer on the head with the handle of a screwdriver several times until the boy fell unconscious, and Sepulvado also immersed the boy into a bathtub full of scalding hot water.

After the assault and scalding, Mercer was allowed to eat, but he vomited, fell over, and lost consciousness right after. Three hours later, the couple took Mercer to DeSoto General Hospital. Despite receiving medical treatment, six-year-old Wesley Mercer was pronounced dead shortly after 2:00 pm on that afternoon. A day later, an autopsy was conducted by doctor George McCormick, and he found that the cause of death was due to failure of the heart and lungs caused by severe third degree burns covering 58% of the boy's body, and McCormick also found multiple head wounds on Mercer.

== Trial, sentencing, and appeals ==
After the police investigations revealed their involvement in the death of Wesley Mercer, the couple were arrested for killing Mercer. Christopher Sepulvado was charged with first-degree murder, while Yvonne Mercer was charged with second-degree murder. Sepulvado admitted to the police and court that he had assaulted Mercer but denied that he intentionally immersed Mercer into the water, claiming that the victim accidentally fell into the bathtub and therefore got scalded by the hot water.

On April 17, 1993, a DeSoto Parish jury found Sepulvado guilty of first-degree murder, and two days later, on April 19, 1993, the jury recommended the death penalty for Sepulvado. In accordance to the jury's verdict, Judge Robert E. Burgess sentenced 49-year-old Christopher Sepulvado to death on May 24, 1993.

As for Yvonne, she was convicted of a lesser charge of manslaughter and sentenced to 21 years in prison. Yvonne's appeal against her conviction was rejected by the Louisiana Second Circuit Court of Appeal on May 10, 1995. Yvonne served 7 1/2 years out of her sentence before she was released in 2002, and had remarried since. She accepted an interview in February 2013, stating that she was saddened with her son's death and felt partly responsible for not ending her toxic relationship with Sepulvado, although she said she never killed her son and was not as evil as what people believed her to be. Yvonne wrote a book regarding her experiences of being abused by Sepulvado throughout their relationship and marriage.

On April 8, 1996, the Louisiana Supreme Court dismissed Christopher Sepulvado's appeal against his conviction and sentence. The U.S. Supreme Court rejected Sepulvado's appeal on October 15 of that same year.

The Louisiana Supreme Court rejected Sepulvado's second appeal (relating to ineffective trial counsel) on March 24, 2000. The 5th Circuit Court of Appeals dismissed Sepulvado's appeal on January 13, 2003.

Sepulvado's second appeal to the 5th Circuit Court of Appeals was dismissed on February 7, 2013. In the end, Sepulvado's final appeal was turned down by the U.S. Supreme Court on October 15, 2013.

== Death warrants and stay orders ==
=== 2010s ===
After exhausting nearly all his appeals, a death warrant was issued to Christopher Sepulvado, whose execution was scheduled to take place on February 13, 2013. The Louisiana Supreme Court denied a stay of execution to Sepulvado on January 28, 2013. The Louisiana Conference of Catholic Bishops appealed to then Governor Bobby Jindal to stay the scheduled execution of Sepulvado.

Subsequently, U.S. District Judge James Joseph Brady delayed the execution pending more information on the state's lethal injection protocol. However, a three-judge panel of the 5th U.S. Circuit Court of Appeals overturned the stay order in August 2013, finding that Brady had abused his discretion in issuing the order. Afterwards, on September 6, 2013, the execution of Sepulvado was re-scheduled to be carried out on November 5, 2013. However, the Louisiana Supreme Court vacated the execution date three weeks later, allowing Sepulvado time to continue with his appeal.

For the second time, Sepulvado's execution date was re-scheduled on February 5, 2014, and in preparation for Sepulvado's upcoming execution, the Louisiana prison authorities decided to switch to a new double-drug combination (midazolam and hydromorphone) to carry out Sepulvado's lethal injection execution in replacement of their usual drug pentobarbital (which the state failed to procure despite efforts to do so). The changes in Louisiana's lethal injection protocols and several other states were made in light of the European drugmakers' decision to stop exporting to the U.S. their barbiturates and sedatives used for lethal injection executions in the death penalty states, and the controversies surrounding the change in these protocols and shortage of lethal injection drugs. In response to the change in the execution protocols, Sepulvado's lawyers argued that this change could increase the risk of subjecting Sepulvado to cruel and unusual punishment, making his execution potentially unconstitutional, and sought to delay Sepulvado's execution.

Two days before the execution could be carried out, the execution date was temporarily staved off with a 90-day postponement, in light of a federal lawsuit filed against the state's newly-enacted lethal injection protocols. While the lawsuit was still pending, the stay of execution was extended to remain in effect until January 2018. In 2015, the U.S. Supreme Court ruled in a separate case that the use of midazolam did not violate the prohibition of cruel and unusual punishment, but it did not have any bearing in the lawsuit, which was still ongoing at that point.

On December 9, 2017, U.S. District Judge James Brady, who was in charge of hearing the lawsuit, died from an illness. On January 5, 2018, the court order that suspended all executions in Louisiana was extended indefinitely due to Brady's death, and another judge was put in charge to preside the lawsuit.

=== 2020s ===
On April 3, 2022, the lawsuit against Louisiana's lethal injection protocols was rejected by U.S. District Judge Shelly Dick, nearly ten years after it was first heard, on the basis that the plaintiffs had no grounds to challenge the protocols due to the state's inability to get the required drugs for lethal injection executions. Sepulvado was one of the ten or so condemned prisoners who acted as the plaintiffs of the motion.

In 2023, then Louisiana Governor John Bel Edwards, who was nearing the end of his governorship in 2024, announced for the first time in public that he opposed the death penalty, and had pushed for lawmakers to abolish the death penalty in Louisiana. However, on May 24, 2023, a majority of lawmakers rejected the bill to abolish capital punishment. A month after the bill was rejected, in June 2023, 56 out of all the 57 inmates on Louisiana's death row filed for clemency from the governor, in light of his abolitionist stance, and Sepulvado was one of the 56 prisoners petitioning for clemency, although the pleas would be processed by the Louisiana's Board of Pardons and Committee on Parole.

In July 2023, the clemency petitions of Sepulvado and the other 55 death row inmates were rejected by the state's parole board, after they found that all the inmates were ineligible for clemency hearings, since the pleas cannot be filed within a year of a judge ruling on an appeal. In October 2023, further appeals by five condemned inmates (including Antoinette Frank) for clemency were all rejected by the state parole board.

In March 2024, Louisiana Governor Jeff Landry (who succeeded Edwards as governor) signed a bill to allow the state to adopt both nitrogen gas inhalation and the electric chair as alternative execution methods aside from lethal injection. The bill was first introduced months after the execution of Kenneth Eugene Smith in Alabama; Smith was the first person from the U.S. and the world to be put to death by nitrogen hypoxia. At that point in time, there was a moratorium on all executions in Louisiana for 14 years, after the state last executed Gerald Bordelon in 2010 for the 2002 rape-murder of his stepdaughter, and the moratorium was a result of the state's difficulty to procure new drugs to carry out further executions by lethal injection and refusal of drug companies to sell them for lethal injection executions. Several family members of murdered victims (whose killers were condemned to death row) supported the Bill to authorise executions by nitrogen gas and electrocution.

== 2025 death warrant ==
In early February 2025, Louisiana Attorney General Liz Murrill announced that the state would resume executions by the newly-enacted method of nitrogen hypoxia, which was first used by Alabama to execute four prisoners between January 2024 and February 2025. Christopher Sepulvado and two other condemned inmates, rapist-killer Jessie D. Hoffman Jr. and the "Cheneyville slasher" Larry Roy, were among the first death row prisoners which the Louisiana authorities sought to execute first. Louisiana Governor Jeff Landry also affirmed the state's decision to resume executions, so as to affirm the promise to bring justice to crime victims after a long wait.

On February 12, 2025, Judge Amy Burford McCartney signed a death warrant for Sepulvado, scheduling his death sentence to be carried out on March 17, 2025. Sepulvado, who was 81 years old at this point in time, was the oldest out of all the 57 death row inmates held in Louisiana. In response to the death warrant, Sepulvado's lawyers argued that their wheelchair-using client was of advanced age and suffered from multiple serious medical ailments and grew remorseful over his stepson's murder, and thus judicial mercy and compassion should be exercised in his case.

Sepulvado's death warrant was the second to be issued that same month to a condemned inmate from Louisiana; Larry Roy's execution was originally scheduled to happen on March 19, 2025, but afterwards, the death warrant of Roy was cancelled after it came to light that Roy had not completely exhausted all his avenues of appeal against the death sentence, which Roy received for a 1994 double murder of Freddie Richard Jr. and Rosetta Silas.

Another Louisiana inmate, Jessie Hoffman Jr., was slated to be put to death for the 1996 rape-murder of Mary Elliot on March 18, 2025, a day after Sepulvado's scheduled execution, which marked the first back-to-back executions set to occur after Louisiana's 15-year moratorium on executions. If he had been executed, Sepulvado would have been the first person to be executed 15 years after the state's last execution in 2010, in addition to being Louisiana's first condemned inmate to die by nitrogen hypoxia.

A week after the scheduling of both Sepulvado's and Hoffman's executions, their respective counsels planned to appeal to the federal courts to challenge the state of Louisiana's decision to conduct executions by nitrogen hypoxia. U.S. District Judge Shelly Dick also chose to revive the previous lawsuit filed by Sepulvado and other condemned inmates against the state's execution protocols, stating that the method of nitrogen hypoxia, which was never used in Louisiana, deserved further scrutiny. Louisiana Attorney General Liz Murrill expressed her intention to appeal against Dick's ruling.

On February 24, 2025, two days after Sepulvado died of natural causes in prison, the 5th U.S. Circuit Court of Appeals halted Judge Dick's ruling, after Attorney General Liz Murrill appealed to overturn Judge Dick's ruling, which Murrill argued could potentially set a bad precedent for other challenges to the constitutionality of Louisiana laws in the district.

== Death ==
On February 22, 2025, nearly two weeks after his execution was scheduled, 81-year-old Sepulvado died of natural causes while on death row.

As a result of Sepulvado's death, Jessie Hoffman Jr. became the only remaining Louisiana death row inmate with a confirmed execution date. Hoffman was executed on March 18, 2025, thus becoming the first person executed in Louisiana after the state's 15-year moratorium on executions. He was also the first person executed by nitrogen hypoxia in Louisiana, after Alabama first used the method to execute four prisoners from January 2024 to February 2025.

== See also ==
- Capital punishment in Louisiana
