= Leslie Dale Martin =

American murderer (1967–2002)

- Born: April 24, 1967; Shreveport, Louisiana, U.S.
- Died: May 10, 2002 (aged 35); Louisiana State Penitentiary, Louisiana] U.S.
- Status: Executed by lethal injection
- Motive: Rape; Witness elimination
- Convictions: First degree murder Sexual battery
- Penalty: Death (May 1992)

Details
- Victims: Christina Burgin, 19
- Date: June 20–21, 1991
- Country: United States
- State: Louisiana

Leslie Dale Martin (April 24, 1967 – May 10, 2002) was an American convicted murderer who was executed by the state of Louisiana for the June 1991 rape and murder of 19-year-old Christina Burgin.

== Early life ==
Martin was born on April 24, 1967, in Shreveport, Louisiana. In 1984, Martin raped his 14-year-old sister at knifepoint. He was convicted of sexual battery and was sentenced to ten years in prison. He was released in early 1990.

== Murder ==
On the evening of June 20, 1991, Martin and a friend, Michael Roland, went to a lounge in Lake Charles, Louisiana. At the lounge, they met 19-year-old Christina Burgin, a student at McNeese State University. Roland and Burgin knew each other and he introduced her to Martin. The two were seen dancing together that night and sharing alcoholic drinks. In the early hours of June 21, Burgin asked Martin for a lift home and they were last seen leaving the lounge together. Burgin was not seen alive again after.

Martin drove with Burgin in his truck and parked up on a dirt road in Iowa. Burgin, who was heavily intoxicated, was then raped by Martin in his truck. After the sexual assault, Burgin threatened to report him to the police for rape. Fearing a return to jail, Martin then choked her in his truck with his hands. He then pulled her out of the vehicle and strangled her with a rope, placed a board over her neck, and jumped on it several times until she died. He then cut her eyes out with a knife so she could not identify him. In the past, Martin had repeatedly said he would never go back to prison. He said he killed Christina so she would "not complain."

Two weeks later, the decomposed body of Burgin was discovered in a shed in Iowa. She was found with a rope around her neck and a wooden board with blood on it was found nearby.

== Trial ==
Martin was charged with first degree murder in the killing of Burgin. At his trial, several witnesses testified against him after Martin confessed to them details of the crime. He was accused of raping and murdering Burgin.

Due to the condition of Burgin's body, there was minimal physical evidence. However, blood was found on Martin's clothes, truck seat cover, and the wooden board recovered near Burgin's body.

In May 1992, Martin was found guilty of killing Burgin and was convicted of first degree murder. He was sentenced to death.

== Escape attempts ==
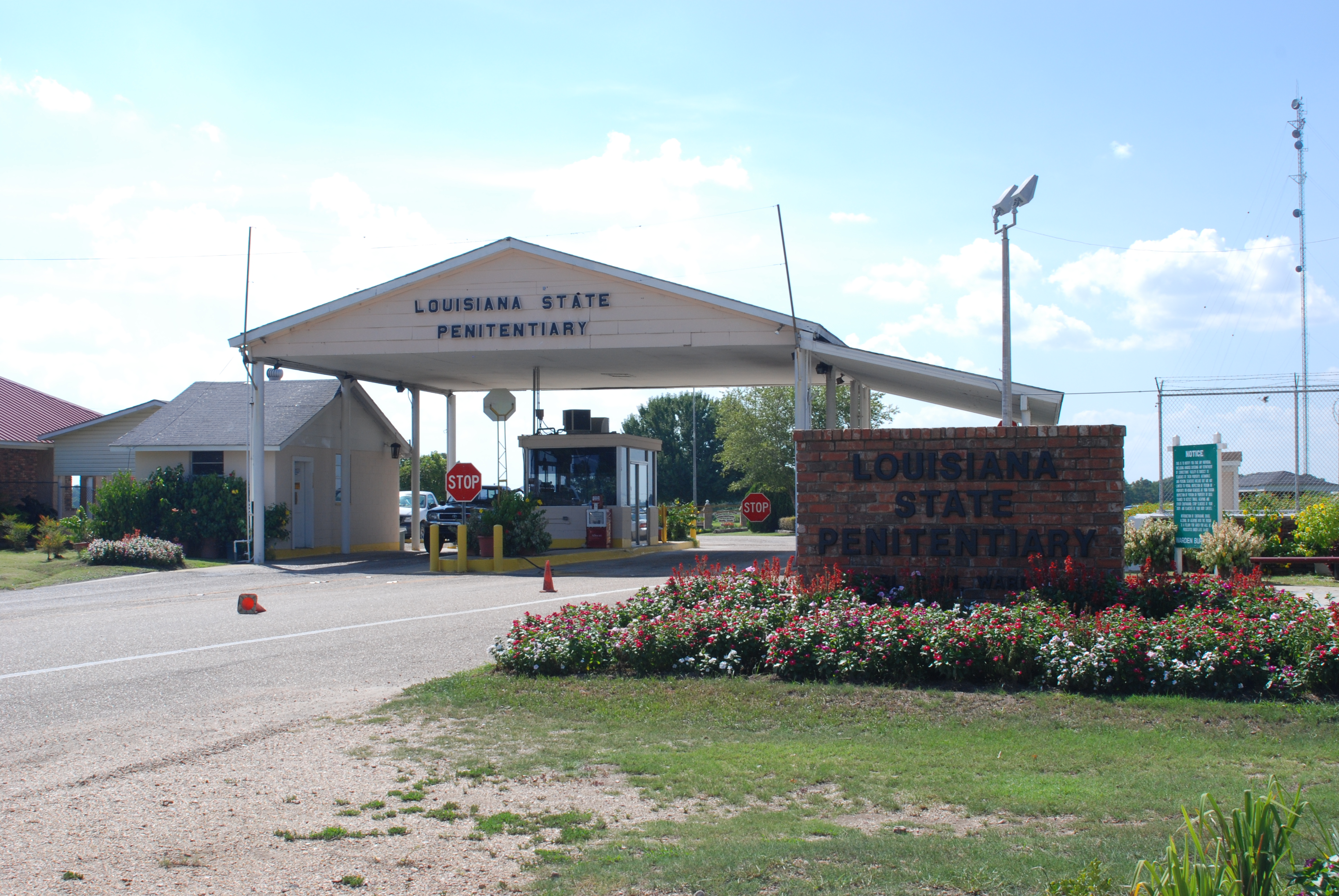
Louisiana State Penitentiary, where Martin was confined and executed

In November 1999, Martin and three other inmates on death row attempted to escape from prison. Using smuggled hacksaw blades, the four men cut through their cell doors and a steel-barred window. The men were caught about two miles from their cells and were returned to death row. The group had paid a corrections officer to bring them the blades they used in their escape. Ultimately, two guards were fired and another two were demoted following the escape attempt.

In January 2002, Martin was overheard talking with another inmate by two death row corrections officers about another escape attempt. In this escape attempt, Martin planned to take hostages and would commandeer a vehicle which he would use to ram through the prison gates. Because of this, Martin was moved to a cell right next to the execution chamber where he would be unable to take hostages and would only have a single guard to talk to.

== Execution ==
In January 2002, Martin was scheduled for execution on February 8, 2002. On January 9, 2002, due to prison officials overhearing Martin's plan of a possible prison escape, he was moved to the death house in the execution building early to await the date of his execution.

On February 8, less than thirty minutes before he was scheduled to be executed, the execution was called off by the U.S. Supreme Court, as they wished to consider whether they wanted to hear an appeal by Martin. On March 28, the entire court refused to act on the request and Martin was rescheduled for execution on May 10.

On May 10, 2002, Martin was executed at Louisiana State Penitentiary by lethal injection. His last meal consisted of boiled crawfish, crawfish stew, a garden salad with Italian dressing, oatmeal cookies and whole milk with chocolate syrup. He did not make a final statement before his death, but did mouth the words "You're fired" to his defense attorney after the lethal injection drugs were injected. He was pronounced dead at 8:16 p.m. Martin was executed on the same day as convicted murderer Lynda Lyon Block, who was executed in Alabama.

Martin remained the last person to be executed in Louisiana for nearly eight years, until Gerald Bordelon was executed in early 2010, after waiving all his appeals and voluntarily going to his execution. Martin was also the last person executed involuntarily in Louisiana for nearly 23 years, until Jessie Dean Hoffman Jr. was executed on March 18, 2025, by nitrogen hypoxia. He also remains the most recent and possibly last person executed involuntarily in the state through lethal injection.

== See also ==
- Capital punishment in Louisiana
- Capital punishment in the United States
- List of people executed in Louisiana
- List of people executed in the United States in 2002

Executions carried out in Louisiana
Preceded by Feltus Taylor June 6, 2000	Leslie Dale Martin; May 10, 2002	Succeeded by Gerald Bordelon January 7, 2010
Executions carried out in the United States
Preceded by Lynda Lyon Block – Alabama May 10, 2002	Leslie Dale Martin – Louisiana; May 10, 2002	Succeeded by Ronford Styron Jr. – Texas May 16, 2002
