= Thomas Lee Ward =

American murderer (1936–1995)

Thomas Lee Ward (1936 – May 16, 1995) was an American murderer and incestual child rapist. He was tried, convicted, and executed by lethal injection in Louisiana for the murder of his stepfather-in-law Wilbert John Spencer.

== Overview ==
On the night of June 22, 1983, Ward arrived by bus in New Orleans, Louisiana from California, where he had just been released from jail after serving 60 days after pleading guilty to misdemeanor of cruelty to a minor for raping his 10-year-old daughter Linda Ward. He went to the residence of Lydia and John Spencer, the mother and stepfather of his estranged wife, Linda. Ward's wife and children were also staying at the house. Ward was allowed into the house to visit his children. He asked and was allowed to bathe and freshen up. Ward learned that his wife had begun receiving welfare and the family was having some trouble with one of the daughters. Ward later claimed that this upset him, but rather than saying or doing anything rash, he left the house.

He then went to a local bar where he drank vodka and beer and "hit up" with cocaine. Ward returned to the house at approximately 5:30 a.m. the next morning, asking to see his children one last time. After visiting with the children he gave his wife his address and phone number in New York City and then went into the bedroom of his wife's mother and stepfather. He pulled out a gun, pointed it at Wilbert John Spencer and said "I am sorry, John, I have to kill you." He then shot Spencer once at close range. As Lydia Spencer reached for her husband, Ward shot her in the stomach. When she turned around, he shot her in the back. She then ran for the door, trying to get out of the house. Ward followed her, striking her with three more shots. Linda Ward and her brother, Ernest Scott, heard the shooting and ran from the house to get help from the neighbors.

When police arrived, Ward walked up to the police officers, apparently to turn himself in. At first, the police did not seize Ward, not yet knowing he was the alleged murderer. Ward claims the police shooed him away because he was drunk. After further investigation at the scene, the police realized who Ward was and arrested him for the murder of Wilbert John Spencer. Lydia Spencer later recovered.

== Trial ==
Ward was indicted by the Orleans Parish Grand Jury with first-degree murder. On August 15, 1984, the jury at Ward's trial found him guilty as charged. After a sentencing hearing, in which Ward testified, the jury unanimously recommended a sentence of death.

At the sentencing phase, Linda Ward testified that her father first raped her when she was 10 years old. She also said that she witnessed Ward raping her two sisters, 14-year-old Romana and 10-year-old Tasha. Linda's brother, Erna Scott, also testified, saying that he'd witnessed Ward raping his 7-year-old sister Lorraine.

== Execution ==
Ward was executed by lethal injection at the Louisiana State Penitentiary on May 16, 1995, at the age of 59. He declined to make a final statement, but dictated to his attorney: "I am leaving the world at peace with myself and with the Almighty. I feel remorse for the things that I did. I hope that young people today will learn that violence is not an answer. I hope the legal system learns that lesson, too. The death penalty is not a solution."

== See also ==
- Capital punishment in Louisiana
- Capital punishment in the United States
- List of people executed in Louisiana
- List of people executed in the United States in 1995

== Sources ==
- Murderers Executed in 2 States. The New York Times (1995-03-17). Retrieved on 2007-11-13.
- State v. Ward, 483 So.2d 578 (La. January 23, 1986).

Executions carried out in Louisiana
Preceded by Robert Sawyer March 5, 1993	Thomas Lee Ward; May 16, 1995	Succeeded by Antonio James March 1, 1996
Executions carried out in the United States
Preceded by Varnell Weeks – Alabama May 12, 1995	Thomas Lee Ward – Louisiana; May 16, 1995	Succeeded by Girvies Davis – Illinois May 17, 1995
