= Robert Sawyer (murderer) =

American murderer (1950–1993)

Robert Wayne Sawyer (October 8, 1950 – March 5, 1993) was an American convicted murderer. He was tried, convicted, and executed by the state of Louisiana for the murder of Frances Arwood. He was the first inmate put to death by lethal injection in Louisiana. Allegations about Sawyer’s mental capacity were made after his conviction.

== Overview ==
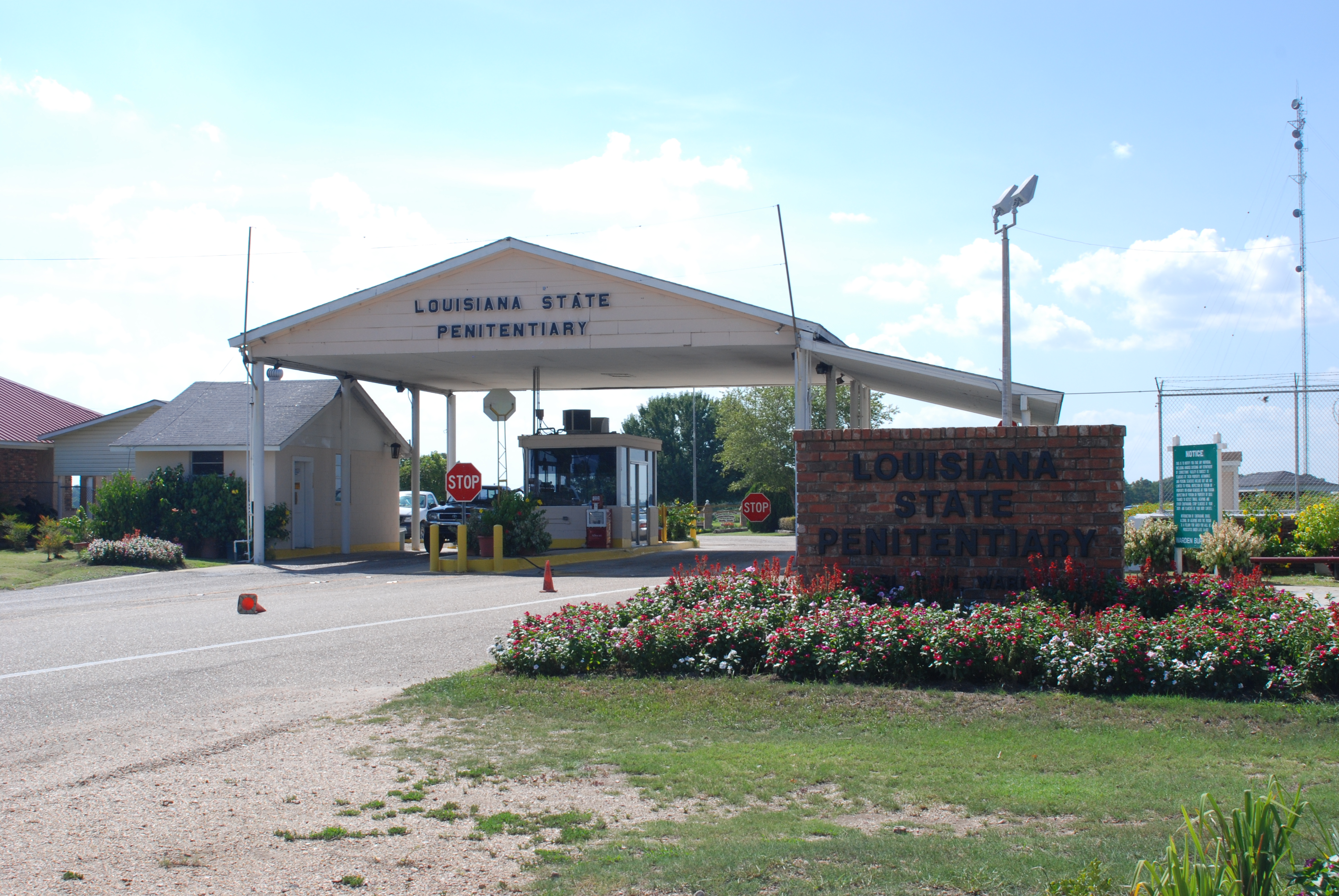
Louisiana State Penitentiary, where Sawyer was confined and executed

On September 28, 1979, Robert Sawyer, Frances Arwood, and Charles W. Lane were at Cynthia Shano's mother's house in Gretna, Louisiana. Arwood was Shano's sister in law, and was baby-sitting with Shano's two small children, who were also present. Sawyer lived at the residence with Shano. When Shano returned home at approximately 12:30 p.m., Sawyer, Lane, and Arwood were arguing. As the arguing continued, Sawyer pushed Arwood's head back against a sofa bed and hit her in the face. At this point, Lane also hit Arwood in the face with his fist. Sawyer then started hitting her in the chest. As Arwood tried to get up from the bed, Sawyer kicked her in the chest and told her to get up and go wash herself.

After Shano had gone into the bedroom with the children, she heard Lane hitting Arwood. When she came out of the bedroom, Shano saw Sawyer drag Arwood by the hair into the bathroom. When Arwood would not get into the bathtub, Sawyer kicked her in the chest, knocking her into the tub, and hitting her head against the wall. Lane then pulled Arwood out of the bathtub and undressed her. The bathroom door was then closed for about twenty minutes.

While Lane was in the bathroom alone with Arwood, Sawyer boiled hot water. He went into the bathroom and poured detergent over Arwood's head and then poured the hot water on her. Lane started ducking Arwood's head under the water and punching her with his fists. Sawyer and Lane then pulled Arwood out of the bathtub. When Arwood resisted by hitting Sawyer, he screamed and kicked her in the chest. Arwood's head hit either the window sill or the bathtub and rendered her unconscious. Sawyer and Lane then carried Arwood into the living room and dropped her face down on the floor. Lane started kicking Arwood in the rib area, while Sawyer walked on her back. After Sawyer beat Arwood with a leather belt, the two men put her on a sofa bed. Shano, who had been screaming for them to stop, covered Arwood's body with a blanket.

While Shano was in the bathroom, after being nauseated, she heard Sawyer say to Lane, "I'll show you how cruel I can be." When Shano returned from the bathroom, she saw smoke coming from Arwood's face and that Arwood's legs were open. Lane was laughing and informed her that his penis was burned because he was having sexual intercourse with her while Sawyer set them on fire.

Sawyer and Lane continued to lounge about the residence listening to records and discussing the disposition of Arwood's body. Lane fell asleep next to her beaten and swollen body.

Shortly after noon, Shano's sister and nephew came to visit. When the nephew knocked insistently, Sawyer gave Shano the key to open the door and she ran screaming to the safety of her relatives. Her excited ravings were incomprehensible to her nephew and sister until they looked inside and saw the gruesome scene and Arwood's beaten and blistered body. They also saw Sawyer sitting with his feet propped up on the edge of the couch.

In the meantime, Shano called for police and emergency units. When the authorities arrived, they arrested Lane and Sawyer and rushed Arwood to West Jefferson Hospital. Arwood, who arrived at the hospital in a coma, had third degree burns all over her body, lacerations on her chin, and swelling of the face and neck. She died on November 21, 1979, approximately two months later. The cause of death was significant brain damage from a blunt head injury and extensive burns over most of her body.

== Trial ==
Sawyer and Lane were indicted for first degree murder by the Jefferson Parish Grand Jury. Lane was tried first and sentenced to life imprisonment. Sawyer was convicted by a unanimous jury, which then proceeded to sentence defendant to death. At the sentencing hearing, the prosecution offered evidence that Sawyer had a previous conviction for involuntary manslaughter in Arkansas. The conviction involved the death of a four-year-old child who had died from a blow to the head. Sawyer had served one year in prison for this crime.

== Execution ==
On Friday, March 5, 1993, Sawyer was executed by lethal injection at Louisiana State Penitentiary (commonly known as Angola) at the age of 42.

His final statement was as follows, "I would like to tell young kids who might read this, that drinking and hanging with the wrong people will get you where I am sitting right here and I hope that nobody else ever has to go through what i have gone through, expecially [sic] young kids. I'm sorry for any hurt and pain they say I caused. I have no hard feelings toward anyone. I just want my sister, my brother-in-law, my son, all of my family and friends to know that I love them and I'll be waiting on them in heaven."

In a petition to the Pardon Board before his execution, Sawyer alleged he was mentally unfit, suffering from organic brain damage.

== See also ==
- Capital punishment in Louisiana
- Capital punishment in the United States
- List of people executed in Louisiana
- List of people executed in the United States in 1993

== Sources ==
- State v. Sawyer, 422 So.2d 95 (La., October 18, 1982).
- State v. Sawyer, 442 So.2d 1136 (La., November 28, 1983).
- State v. Lane, 414 So.2d 1223 (La., 1982).
- "Decision offers possible reprieve for handful of inmates in La,". Gwen Filosa, 06/21/02 * Times-Picayune. (http://nolassf.dev.advance.net/crimestory/death21.html)
- "Beyond Reason: Mental Retardation: An Overview". Human Rights Watch. March 2001.

Executions carried out in Louisiana
Preceded by Andrew Lee Jones July 22, 1991	Robert Sawyer; March 5, 1993	Succeeded by Thomas Lee Ward May 16, 1995
Executions carried out in the United States
Preceded by James Allen Red Dog – Delaware March 3, 1993	Robert Sawyer – Louisiana; March 5, 1993	Succeeded by Syvasky Poyner – Virginia March 18, 1993
