= Execution of Antonio James =

American murderer (died 1996)

Antonio G. James (c. 1954 – March 1, 1996) was an American murderer. He was tried and executed in Louisiana for the murder of Henry Silver. James claims to have not been the murderer in the event and held that conviction to his death.

== Prior criminal history ==
James had amassed a very extensive juvenile and criminal record by the time he was tried for the murder of Silver. The post-sentence investigation report prepared for the sentencing court listed 37 juvenile incidents. James was ordered confined to the Louisiana Training Institute at age 14. In 1973, he was convicted of attempted armed robbery and sentenced to serve three years at the state penitentiary. During this period of confinement, he was convicted of attempted simple escape. He was released in 1975. In 1978, he was charged with aggravated rape, but the charge was later refused by the prosecution. James was convicted of the January 23, 1979, first degree murder of Alvin Adams and was sentenced to life imprisonment. He was convicted of the January 26, 1979, armed robbery of Robert Hooten and was sentenced to 99 years for this offense, the maximum under Louisiana law.

== Murder of Henry Silver ==
On January 1, 1979, James approached 70-year-old Henry Silver as the latter was getting out of his car in his neighborhood in New Orleans. James placed a gun to Silver's head and demanded his money. When Silver shouted for help, James placed the gun under Silver's right ear, cocked the hammer, and fired a shot into Silver's head. James then rifled through Silver's pockets and removed his wallet containing $35. He drove away in a nearby waiting car. Silver died a few hours later at Charity Hospital. James was arrested on January 26, 1979, when he bungled another armed robbery attempt and was shot with his own gun. He was indicted for first degree murder. According to James's testimony, he was not alone during either of these two robberies, and had not held onto the gun. He claimed that the other two men fired the shots on these men while he just stood there.

== Trial ==
He was indicted for first degree murder by an Orleans Parish Grand Jury. In December 1981, a jury found him guilty as charged at a trial where the principal witness against James was his accomplice, Levon Price. After deliberation, the same jury unanimously recommended that the defendant be sentenced to death.

== Execution ==
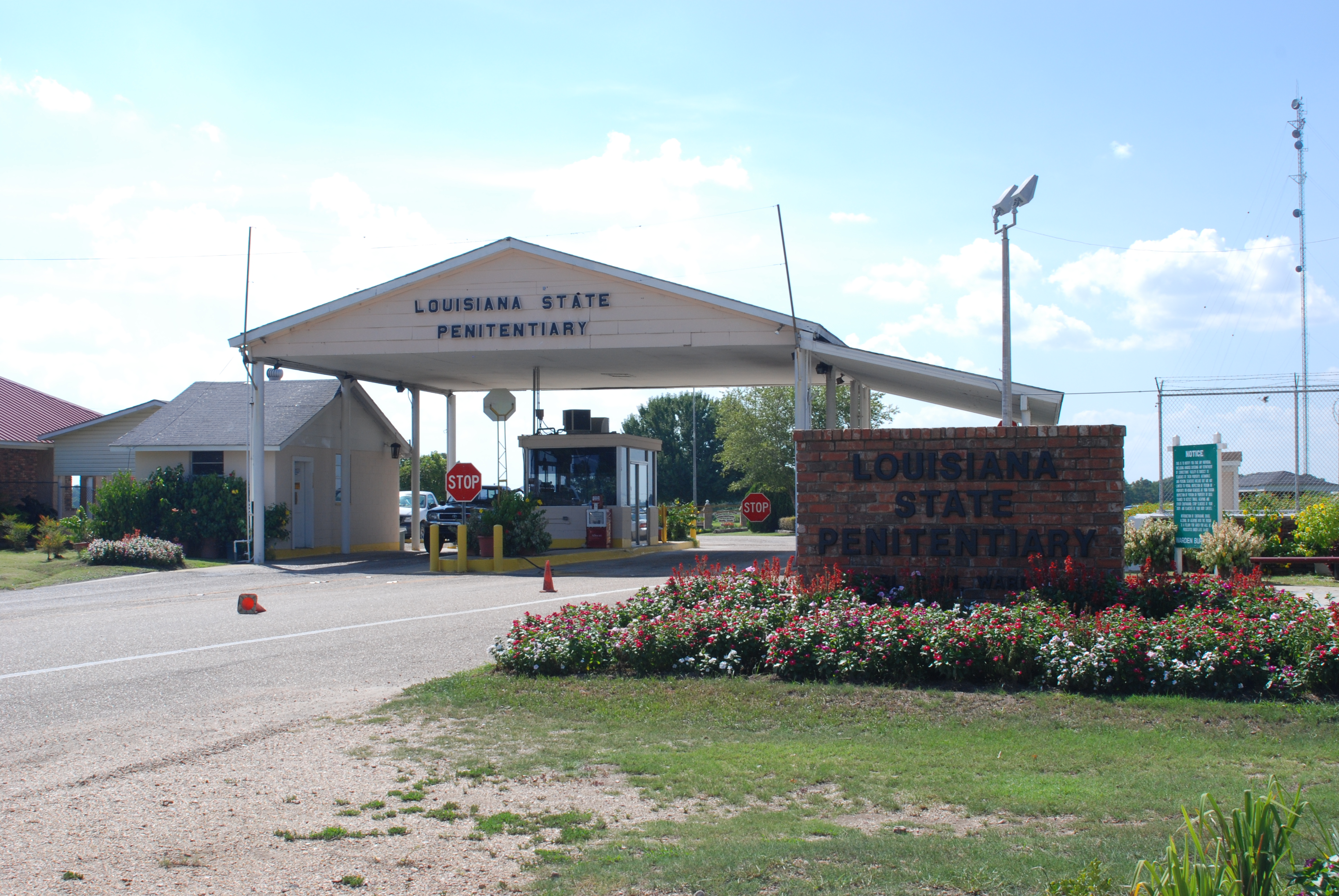
Louisiana State Penitentiary, where James died.

On March 1, 1996, James was executed by lethal injection at the Louisiana State Penitentiary at the age of 42. The execution team had difficulty locating a vein to insert the catheter into his arm in order to commence the execution. Warden Burl Cain requested that James make a fist in order to assist the process. James complied in this request.

James declined to give a final statement. However, Warden Cain later said that James stated "Bless you", as he was strapped to the execution gurney. His last meal was fried oysters and crab gumbo.

James's execution was the subject of an ABC News documentary on Prime Time Live. In the UK the BBC broadcast a 40-minute piece on 18 April 1996 on Radio 4 about this case, with particular reference to the role of the British lawyer Clive Stafford Smith in providing adequate defence for such cases.

== See also ==
- Capital punishment in Louisiana
- Capital punishment in the United States
- List of people executed in Louisiana
- List of people executed in the United States in 1996

Executions carried out in Louisiana
Preceded by Thomas Lee Ward May 16, 1995	Antonio James; March 1, 1996	Succeeded by John A. Brown Jr. April 24, 1997
Executions carried out in the United States
Preceded by Kenneth Granviel – Texas February 27, 1996	Antonio James – Louisiana; March 1, 1996	Succeeded by Richard Moran – Nevada March 30, 1996
