= Feltus Taylor =

American murderer

Feltus Taylor Jr. (March 17, 1961 – June 6, 2000) was an American murderer. He was convicted and later executed by the state of Louisiana for robbery and the murder of Donna Ponsano.

== Crime ==
Donna Ponsano worked as a cook at Cajun's Fabulous Fried Chicken restaurant on Florida Boulevard in Baton Rouge. At approximately 7:00 a.m. on the morning of March 27, 1991, Keith Clark, the restaurant's manager, arrived to assist Ponsano in opening for business. After tending to morning chores in the rear of the restaurant, Clark returned to the front and noticed Taylor knocking at the front door. Taylor, a former employee of the restaurant whom Clark had hired approximately six months earlier, had been fired by Clark about two weeks previously for poor performance, he and Clark were still friendly. Clark opened the door for Taylor.

Taylor, who was experiencing financial problems, asked Clark to rehire him. Clark refused, but assisted him in searching for another job by giving him money to buy a newspaper and sitting with him in a restaurant booth to review classified job advertisements. Clark found that a local Popeyes restaurant was seeking a cook, and called to recommend Taylor for the job. He made a 9:00 a.m. appointment with the Popeyes manager responsible for hiring, and intended to accompany Taylor to discuss his qualifications.

While waiting for Taylor's appointment, Clark continued with his morning routine, and Taylor helped by sweeping the dining area of the restaurant. As Clark was placing money into the cash registers, Taylor decided that robbery was the solution to his financial problems. He exited the restaurant to retrieve a .22 caliber handgun and handcuffs from his car which was parked in front.

Upon re-entering the restaurant, Taylor grabbed Ponsano, held the gun to her head and demanded that Clark open the restaurant's floor safe located in a storeroom at the rear of the building. Clark complied after Taylor threatened to shoot Ponsano in the head. As the three of them went to the back of the restaurant, Clark tried to escape through a rear entry door. However, he failed because the door was locked. Taylor then handcuffed Clark and Ponsano together. Clark opened the safe, and gave Taylor its contents, approximately $800.00.

Clark tried to convince Taylor not to continue with the robbery, but he refused, saying that his financial problems were too serious and that his car payment of $134.00 was due. Taylor refused an offer from Clark to loan or give him a personal check, and instructed Clark not to inform the police about the robbery. After Clark told Taylor that he would not lie to the police, he again asked Clark to rehire him. Ponsano expressed her opposition to rehiring Taylor by stating "you're not going to give him his job back, are you". Taylor then shot Ponsano five times, in the head and upper forearm. After emptying the gun, he exited the room, reloaded, returned and shot Clark in the head. He then emptied the cash register of approximately $580.00, exited through the front door, got into his car and drove away.

Between 8:00 and 8:30 a.m., while Taylor was herding Clark and Ponsano to the back of the restaurant, another employee of Cajun's, Viola Kaglear, arrived for work. She recognized Taylor's car in the front of the building. When no one responded to her knocking on the front door, Kaglear looked into the front windows and saw Taylor and Clark going into the storeroom. She waited a few minutes, went to the rear of the building, and looked through a two-way peep hole in the back door where she saw Taylor exit and return to the storeroom.

On hearing gunshots, she ran to a neighboring Frostop restaurant where she alerted Josephine Hookfin, a Frostop employee, and William H. Johns, a food salesman, of the shooting. Hookfin immediately called the emergency services. During the 911 telephone call, Taylor exited the restaurant, and got into his car. As he drove away, Johns was able to read the automobile's license plate number, and relayed it to Hookfin and Kaglear, who gave it to the 911 operator.

When the police and emergency medical personnel arrived at the scene, they found Ponsano and Clark lying in the storeroom handcuffed together, each with multiple gunshot wounds to the head. Ponsano received treatment and surgery in a nearby hospital, but died two days later. Clark survived, but suffers from paralysis and minor brain damage.

At approximately 10:00 p.m. on the day of the shooting, police arrested Taylor near his apartment for attempted first degree murder and armed robbery. Thereafter, he confessed and led the police to the stolen money, which was hidden in a field not far from his apartment. Taylor informed the police that he had thrown the murder weapon into the Mississippi River.

== Trial ==
Taylor was indicted by a grand jury for the first degree murder of Donna Ponsano, in violation of Louisiana Revised Statute 14:30. The jury found Taylor guilty, and unanimously recommended the death penalty. The court sentenced Taylor in accordance with the recommendation.

== Imprisonment ==
Taylor's spiritual advisor on death row was The Rev. Charles deGravelles. an Episcopal deacon who founded the Episcopal prison ministry at Angola in 1990. Beginning in 1997, through correspondence and frequent personal visits, deGravelles supported Taylor in efforts to find peace and to reconcile with his victims.

During his incarceration, Taylor was encouraged and assisted in writing his autobiography through the LSU Office of Social Service Research and Development, under the direction of Cecile Guin, through contacts from the public defender's office. Taylor's autobiography was eventually edited by Monique Morrison and published in 2026 by Bloomsbury Press under the title Waiting to Die: One Man's Journey on Death Row, with a foreword by Sister Helen Prejean.

== Execution ==
On June 6, 2000, Taylor was executed by lethal injection at Louisiana State Penitentiary at the age of 38. At his execution to support Taylor were his spiritual advisor, The Rev. Charles deGravelles, and his federal public defender Jean Faria. In his final statement he said, "I want to tell you, Keith, and the Ponsano family that I always regretted what I've done. It was my own doing. After this is over with, I hope you can find the peace to move on."

His official last meal consisted of ribs, toast, onion rings, shrimp, corn on the cob, and cheesecake.

== See also ==
- Capital punishment in Louisiana
- Capital punishment in the United States
- List of people executed in Louisiana
- List of people executed in the United States in 2000

Executions carried out in Louisiana
Preceded by Dobie Gillis Williams January 8, 1999	Feltus Taylor; June 6, 2000	Succeeded by Leslie Dale Martin May 10, 2002
Executions carried out in the United States
Preceded by Pernell Ford – Alabama June 2, 2000	Feltus Taylor – Louisiana; June 6, 2000	Succeeded by Bennie Demps – Florida June 7, 2000
