= Dobie Gillis Williams =

American criminal convicted of murder and sentenced to death

Dobie Gillis Williams (December 14, 1960 – January 8, 1999) was an American from Louisiana who was convicted of the murder of Sonja Knippers in 1984, and sentenced to death. He was executed in 1999. Williams was originally scheduled to be executed in November 1998, but the governor granted him a reprieve to conduct DNA tests, which were unavailable at the time of his conviction. After the tests reaffirmed his guilt, Williams was executed a month later.

Police testified that Williams had confessed to the murder after they found fresh scratches and bruises on his arms and legs. The confession was not recorded, albeit a failed attempt to mechanically record the confession was made. Williams was evaluated as intellectually disabled, according to one standard. However, an expert for the defense later determined that Williams was of dull normal intelligence, suggesting that he was a malingerer.

Williams' execution was twice stayed and his sentence was overturned by a federal district court judge. Williams was executed, however, because the 5th Circuit Court of Appeals ruled that mitigating information was introduced to the jury too late in the case. It ruled that the execution had to proceed, under the 1996 Antiterrorism and Effective Death Penalty Act (AEDPA).

== Overview ==
An intruder entered the rural home of Herbert and Sonja Knippers in the early morning hours of July 8, 1984. He appeared to gain entry by stacking two milk crates outside the Knippers' bathroom window and cutting the screen. After Sonja entered the bathroom some time later, the attacker tried to rape her and began stabbing her with a knife. Her husband Herbert unsuccessfully tried to break down the bathroom door during the attack. The intruder fled the scene through the bathroom window. Sonja opened the door on her own and was helped to a couch. She bled to death in their home. Herbert told investigators later that his wife was yelling that a black man was killing her.

== Suspect and arrest ==
At the time of the murder, Dobie Gillis Williams was on a five-day furlough from Camp Beauregard, where he had been imprisoned for attempted simple burglary. Although he had no prior convictions for violence, it was later revealed that the woman who was the victim of Williams's prior "simple burglary" had told the police that Williams continued to try to get in her house, despite knowing that she and her children were in the home, and that Williams was aware she was inside. Nevertheless, Williams was allowed the visit because he was considered a model prisoner and not prone to violence. He was staying at his grandfather's home, approximately 0.4 mi (0.6 km) from the Knippers' residence.

Williams had been seen approximately an hour prior to the murder, walking away from his grandfather's house. As investigating detectives were aware of Williams' criminal record, they picked the man up for questioning. They allegedly told him they would be there until they "got what they wanted."

== Trial ==
Williams was indicted for first degree murder by a grand jury for Sabine Parish. Exclusion of people of color from the grand jury violated Louisiana Revised Statute 14:30 as it compromises due process.

The defendant's motion for a change of venue was granted, which resulted in the transfer of the case to the 35th Judicial District Court in Grant Parish. An all-white jury was seated for the trial.

The prosecution said that a medical examination revealed scratches and abrasions on Williams' body that were consistent with the type of wounds that an individual might incur by quickly exiting through the Knippers' bathroom window, as they suggested he did.

Three police officers testified that Dobie confessed after questioning, but they had no recording of this. They said that he told the officers that after the stabbing he jumped out of the bathroom window, dropped the knife in the Knippers' yard, and ran to his grandfather's house, where he hid his shirt underneath the porch. The investigators returned to the Knippers' home, where they found a kitchen knife in 4 in. (2.5 cm) of damp grass. The officers later retrieved the shirt from where Williams hid it, but there was no blood or other forensic evidence on it. At the trial, several investigating detectives testified to the content of Williams' confession.

The prosecution said that the autopsy showed that the stab wounds in the victim's body were consistent with the type of wounds that would have been made by the knife found in the Knippers' yard.

Forensic analysis of the crime scene confirmed that the blood found on the Knippers' bathroom window curtain matched Williams' blood type, one that is very rare among blacks. The analysis confirmed that the blood could not have come from either of the Knippers. Hair taken from the window was found to have characteristics consistent with Williams' hair.

Since the first trial, both of these types of evidence have been generally superseded by newer tests, particularly for DNA, that yield much more accurate results.

After a four-day jury trial, Williams was convicted of first degree murder. At the sentencing phase of the trial, the jury unanimously recommended the death penalty, which the judge imposed.

== Appeals ==
Williams' case was appealed by Nick Trentacosta of the Louisiana Center for Equal Justice. He contends that Williams' execution was in error. During the appeals, a defense expert strongly criticized the prosecution's contention that Williams had gotten in and out through the bathroom window, as he would have had great difficulty getting through its 18" width.

The execution was twice stayed, once by the United States Supreme Court and once by the Louisiana governor. During the last appeal, the defense asked for DNA analysis of forensic evidence, as this was more accurate than previous tests. The state's lab determined that the DNA from blood on the curtain matched Williams.

A federal court judge overturned Williams' sentence, but the 5th Circuit Court of Appeals overruled, and the execution went forward. The 5th Circuit said that mitigating information had been introduced to a jury too late in the process, and upheld his sentence under the 1996 Antiterrorism and Effective Death Penalty Act (AEDPA).

=== Execution ===
On January 8, 1999, Williams was executed by lethal injection at the Louisiana State Penitentiary. He ate twelve chocolate bars and some ice cream for his last meal. In his final statement, he said, “I just want to say I don’t have any hard feelings toward anyone. God bless everyone. God bless.”

== Controversy ==
In 2005, Williams was one of two subjects of a book by Sister Helen Prejean, a Catholic nun and anti-death penalty activist. She contended that Williams could not have possibly committed the murder and was wrongfully convicted and executed. She believed that he had ineffective legal counsel; in fact, his lawyer was later disbarred for incompetence. She also notes that poor and minority people are disproportionately sentenced to death and executed in the United States criminal justice system. In 2005, Williams was one of the subjects of Sister Prejean's book, The Death of Innocents: An Eyewitness Account of Wrongful Executions.

Although Williams's lawyer, Michael Bonnette, was disbarred for incompetence in other cases, it was found that he had performed an adequate job defending Williams. Bonnette did not put any witnesses on the stand to prevent the state from presenting any rebuttal evidence. As a federal appellate court later noted, had Bonnette presented any witnesses, this would've allowed the prosecution to have the victim of Williams's prior "simple burglary" to testify about how he had continued to try to break into her home after realizing that she and her children were inside.

== See also ==
- Capital punishment in Louisiana
- Capital punishment in the United States
- List of people executed in Louisiana
- List of people executed in the United States in 1999

Executions carried out in Louisiana
Preceded by John A. Brown Jr. April 24, 1997	Dobie Gillis Williams; January 8, 1999	Succeeded by Feltus Taylor June 6, 2000
Executions carried out in the United States
Preceded by Ronnie Howard – South Carolina January 8, 1999	Dobie Gillis Williams – Louisiana; January 8, 1999	Succeeded by Kelvin Malone – Missouri January 13, 1999
