= Murder in Louisiana law =

Murder in Louisiana law constitutes the intentional killing, under circumstances defined by law, of people within or under the jurisdiction of the U.S. state of Louisiana.

Louisiana defines homicide in the third degree as manslaughter. There are other specific guidelines: for example, the killing of a police officer or firefighter, or intent to kill more than one person, is automatically a first-degree murder charge. In Louisiana convicted murderers can receive life imprisonment or the death penalty.

The United States Centers for Disease Control and Prevention reported that in 2020, the state had the second highest murder rate in the country behind Mississippi.

== Penalties ==
Offense	Mandatory sentencing
Negligent homicide	Up to five years in prison
Manslaughter	Up to 40 years in prison (minimum of 10 years if the victim was a child under 10; eligible for parole after 25 years if the defendant was a juvenile)
Second-degree murder	Life without parole (eligible for parole after 25 years if the defendant was a juvenile)
First-degree murder	Death, life without parole, or life (minimum of 25 years; only an option if the defendant was a juvenile)
