= John A. Brown Jr. =

American murderer (c.1962/63–1997)

John Ashley Brown Jr.
- Born: c. 1962/1963; United States
- Died: April 24, 1997 (aged 35); Louisiana State Penitentiary, Louisiana, U.S.
- Status: Executed by lethal injection
- Convictions: First degree murder Attempted first degree murder Armed robbery (4 counts); Simple robbery Simple burglary (2 counts); Simple escape Theft
- Penalty: Death

Details
- Date: September 7, 1984
- Country: United States
- State: Louisiana
- Location: New Orleans

John Ashley Brown Jr. (c. 1962/1963 – April 24, 1997) was an American from New Orleans who was convicted of first-degree murder and incarcerated on death row in Louisiana State Penitentiary for 12 years. He was one of six inmates featured in the 1998 documentary entitled The Farm: Angola, USA. He was executed in 1997 for the murder of Omer Laughlin in New Orleans in 1984.

== Crime ==
Brown was a resident of New Orleans with prior convictions for robbery, burglary, theft, and escape. He said that on September 7, 1984, he had run out of cocaine and needed money to purchase more of the drug.

That evening Omer Laughlin and his wife had eaten dinner at a restaurant near the corner of Dauphine and Touro streets in Faubourg Marigny in New Orleans. At approximately 11:45 p.m., they left the restaurant and began walking to their car, located about a block away. A man stepped out of a nearby vehicle and confronted the Laughlins. He pinned them against their car and demanded money from Omer Laughlin. His wife screamed and ran back toward the restaurant. By the time she returned to the car with help, her husband was dead.

According to the New Orleans police officer who arrived at the site, he found Omer Laughlin lying "face down in the street, bleeding profusely". An autopsy later revealed that Laughlin had been stabbed thirteen times. His wife gave the police a description of the perpetrator and the vehicle which he had exited just before the attack. She told police that a woman with dark hair had been driving that car.

== Arrest ==
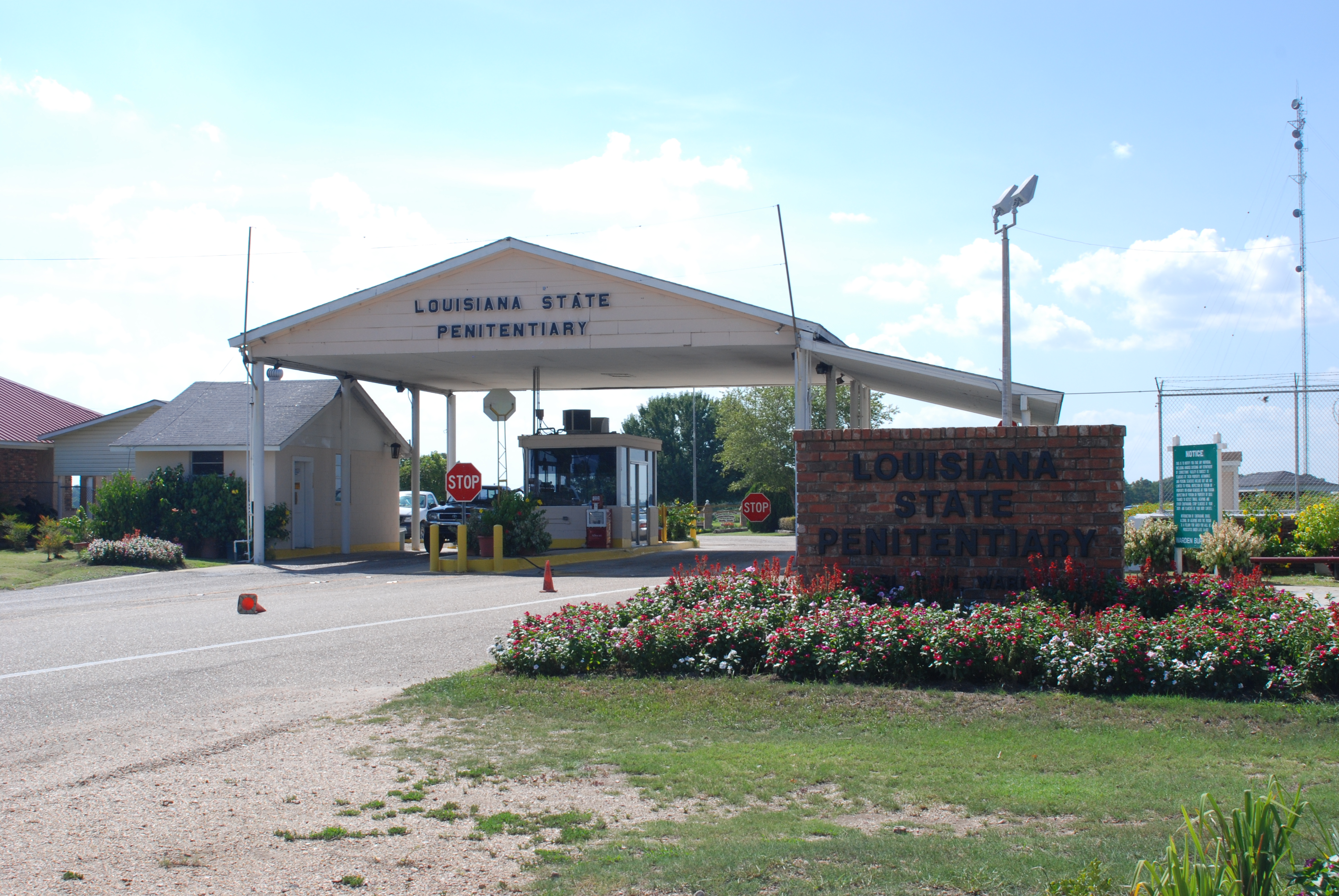
Louisiana State Penitentiary, where Brown was confined and executed

Sergeant James Scott of the New Orleans Police Department was stopped at a traffic light on Franklin Avenue when he heard the description of the crime and the suspects being broadcast over the police radio. He saw a man (later identified as Brown) sitting in a vehicle that matched the description given by Omer Laughlin's wife. A woman, later found to be Anna Hardeman, was at the wheel of the car. When this vehicle pulled into a nearby service station, Scott followed, believing that the people in the car might be the suspects in the reported attack. He watched as the woman put gasoline in the car, while the man walked over to a water hose and began washing his hands. He returned and got back in the car.

Scott approached the vehicle and ordered the man to step out and place his hands on the hood of the car. When he did so, Scott observed scratches, marks, and droplets of blood on the man's forearms. He also observed blood between the man's toes, which were visible through the sandals that he was wearing. Scott also saw on the floor of the car a New Orleans shopper's card in the name of Omer Laughlin.

Scott arrested Brown and took him into custody. A search of the vehicle pursuant to routine police procedure yielded Laughlin's wallet. A second search pursuant to a warrant led to the discovery of a Bowie knife, which had been concealed underneath the front seat of the car on the passenger side. Laughlin's wife identified Brown from lineup photographs as the man who had attacked her husband.

== Trial ==
Brown was indicted by an Orleans Parish grand jury for the first-degree murder of Omer Laughlin. The trial jury convicted Brown of first-degree murder following the guilt phase of a bifurcated trial. After a sentencing hearing, the jury unanimously recommended the death penalty. Judge Patrick Quinlan sentenced Brown to death.

Anna Hardeman, the driver of the vehicle in which Brown was riding at the time of his arrest, was also indicted for first-degree murder. She was originally charged in the same bill of indictment that named Brown as a defendant, but the prosecution severed the charges against her on the date that the case was called to trial. It announced that she would be tried separately. Shortly after Brown was convicted and sentenced to death, Hardeman pleaded guilty to the amended charge of accessory after the fact to first-degree murder, and was sentenced to five years imprisonment at hard labor.

== Execution ==
Brown was executed by lethal injection on April 24, 1997. According to warden Burl Cain, Brown spoke one last word, "Wow".

== Representation in other media ==
Brown was one of the six inmates featured in the documentary about Louisiana State Penitentiary, The Farm. At the time that the documentary was filmed, Brown had reached the last appeal of his conviction and sentence. The documentary showed his hearing before a parole board two days before his execution, several interviews with Brown only hours before his execution, and finally, his body being transported outside of the prison after his execution was completed.

== See also ==
- List of people executed in Louisiana
- List of people executed in the United States in 1997

== Sources ==
- State v. Brown, 514 So.2d 99 (Louisiana, October 19, 1987).

Executions carried out in Louisiana
Preceded by Antonio James March 1, 1996	John A. Brown Jr. April 24, 1997	Succeeded by Dobie Gillis Williams January 8, 1999
Executions carried out in the United States
Preceded by Benjamin Boyle – Texas April 21, 1997	John A. Brown Jr. – Louisiana; April 24, 1997	Succeeded by Ernest Baldree – Texas April 29, 1997
