= List of people executed in Louisiana =

The following is a list of people executed by the U.S. state of Louisiana since capital punishment was resumed in the United States in 1976.

A total of 29 people convicted of murder have been executed by the state of Louisiana since 1976. Of the 29 people executed, 20 were executed via electrocution, 8 via lethal injection and 1 via nitrogen hypoxia. The most recent Louisiana inmate to be put to death, Jessie Hoffman Jr., was the first in the state to be executed by nitrogen hypoxia.

== List of people executed in Louisiana since 1976 ==
No.	Name	Race	Age	Sex	Date of execution	Parish	Method	Victim(s)	Governor
1	Robert Wayne Williams	Black	31	M	December 14, 1983	East Baton Rouge	Electrocution	Willie Kelly	Dave Treen
2	Johnny Davis Taylor Jr.	Black	30	M	February 29, 1984	Jefferson	Electrocution	David Vogler	Dave Treen
3	Elmo Patrick Sonnier	White	34	M	April 5, 1984	Iberia	Electrocution	Loretta Ann Bourque and David LeBlanc	Edwin Edwards
4	Timothy George Baldwin	White	46	M	September 10, 1984	Ouachita	Electrocution	Mary Lee Peters	Edwin Edwards
5	Earnest Knighton Jr.	Black	38	M	October 30, 1984	Bossier	Electrocution	Ralph Shell	Edwin Edwards
6	Robert Lee Willie	White	26	M	December 28, 1984	St. Tammany	Electrocution	Faith Hathaway (Note: Also killed Dennis Buford Hemby and St. Tammany Parish Deputy Sheriff Louis Wagner II, but was executed for killing Hathaway.)	Edwin Edwards
7	David Dene Martin	White	32	M	January 4, 1985	Terrebonne	Electrocution	4 murder victims (Note: The 4 victims were: Bobby Todd, Terry Hebert, Sandra Brake, and Anne Tierney.)	Edwin Edwards
8	Benjamin A. Berry	White	31	M	June 7, 1987	Jefferson	Electrocution	Jefferson Parish Deputy Sheriff Robert Cochran	Edwin Edwards
9	Alvin Rudolph Moore Jr.	Black	27	M	June 9, 1987	Bossier	Electrocution	Jo Ann Wilson	Edwin Edwards
10	Jimmy L. Glass	White	25	M	June 12, 1987	Webster	Electrocution	Newt Brown and Erlene Brown	Edwin Edwards
11	Jimmy C. Wingo	White	35	M	June 16, 1987	Webster	Electrocution	Newt Brown and Erlene Brown	Edwin Edwards
12	Willie Lawrence Celestine	Black	30	M	July 20, 1987	Lafayette	Electrocution	Marcelaine Richard	Edwin Edwards
13	Willie Watson	Black	31	M	July 24, 1987	St. Charles	Electrocution	Kathy Newman	Edwin Edwards
14	John E. Brogdon	White	25	M	July 30, 1987	St. Charles	Electrocution	Barbara Jo Brown	Edwin Edwards
15	Sterling John Rault Jr.	White	36	M	August 24, 1987	Orleans	Electrocution	Jane Ellen Francioni	Edwin Edwards
16	Wayne Robert Felde	White	38	M	March 15, 1988 (Note: Felde was executed 12 hours after Buddy Roemer's inauguration as Louisiana governor. Roemer and his predecessor, Edwin Edwards, each rejected appeals for clemency.)	Caddo	Electrocution	Shreveport Police Officer Glen Tompkins	Buddy Roemer
17	Leslie Lowenfield	Black	34	M	April 13, 1988	Jefferson	Electrocution	5 murder victims (Note: The 5 victims were: Sheila Thomas, Shantel Osborne, Carl Osborne, Owen Griffin, and Myrtle Griffin.)	Buddy Roemer
18	Edward R. Byrne Jr.	White	28	M	June 14, 1988	Bossier	Electrocution	Roberta June Johnson	Buddy Roemer
19	Dalton Prejean	Black	30	M	May 18, 1990	Lafayette	Electrocution	Louisiana State Police Trooper Donald Cleveland (Note: Also killed John Doucet, but was executed for killing Cleveland.)	Buddy Roemer
20	Andrew Lee Jones	Black	35	M	July 22, 1991	East Baton Rouge	Electrocution	Tumekica Michelle Jackson	Buddy Roemer
21	Robert Wayne Sawyer	White	41	M	March 5, 1993	Jefferson	Lethal injection	Frances Arwood	Edwin Edwards
22	Thomas Lee Ward	Black	59	M	May 16, 1995	Orleans	Lethal injection	Wilbert John Spencer	Edwin Edwards
23	Antonio G. James	Black	42	M	March 1, 1996	Orleans	Lethal injection	Henry Silver (Note: Also killed Alvin Adams, but was executed for killing Silver.)	Mike Foster
24	John Ashley Brown Jr.	White	35	M	April 24, 1997	Orleans	Lethal injection	Omer Laughlin	Mike Foster
25	Dobie Gillis Williams	Black	38	M	January 8, 1999	Sabine (Note: Was tried and convicted in Grant Parish.)	Lethal injection	Sonja Knippers	Mike Foster
26	Feltus Taylor Jr.	Black	39	M	June 6, 2000	East Baton Rouge	Lethal injection	Donna Ponsano	Mike Foster
27	Leslie Dale Martin	White	35	M	May 10, 2002	Calcasieu	Lethal injection	Christina Burgin	Mike Foster
28	Gerald James Bordelon	White	47	M	January 7, 2010	Livingston	Lethal injection	Courtney LeBlanc	Bobby Jindal
29	Jessie Dean Hoffman Jr.	Black	46	M	March 18, 2025	St. Tammany	Nitrogen hypoxia	Mary Margaret Elliott	Jeff Landry

== Demographics ==
Race
White	15	52%
Black	14	48%
Age
20–29	5	17%
30–39	18	62%
40–49	5	17%
50–59	1	3%
Sex
Male	29	100%
Date of execution
1976–1979	0	0%
1980–1989	18	62%
1990–1999	7	24%
2000–2009	2	7%
2010–2019	1	3%
2020–2029	1	3%
Method
Electrocution	20	69%
Lethal injection	8	28%
Nitrogen hypoxia	1	3%
Governor (Party)
Edwin Edwards (D) (Note: Capital punishment in Louisiana was officially reinstated in 1977 (after a 1973 law was ruled unconstitutional by the Supreme Court) during Edwards' second of four terms as governor. His second term expired March 10, 1980. His third term was March 12, 1984-March 14, 1988; his fourth was January 13, 1992-January 8, 1996.)	15	52%
Dave Treen (R)	2	7%
Buddy Roemer (D/R) (Note: Roemer switched his party affiliation from Democratic to Republican on March 11, 1991.)	5	17%
Mike Foster (R)	5	17%
Kathleen Blanco (D)	0	0%
Bobby Jindal (R) (Note: Gerald Bordelon, the only person executed during Jindal's two terms, waived all appeals.)	1	3%
John Bel Edwards (D)	0	0%
Jeff Landry (R)	1	3%
Total	29	100%

== See also ==
- Capital punishment in Louisiana
- Capital punishment in the United States
- List of people executed in Louisiana (pre-1972) – executions before Furman
