= Gerald Bordelon =

American murderer (1962–2010)

- 2010 prison photo
- Born: Gerald James Bordelon; February 19, 1962; Denham Springs, Louisiana, U.S.
- Died: January 7, 2010 (aged 47); Louisiana State Penitentiary, West Feliciana Parish, Louisiana, U.S.
- Cause of death: Execution by lethal injection
- Convictions: First degree murder Forcible rape Aggravated crime against nature (2 counts)
- Penalty: Death (June 30, 2006)

Details
- Victims: Courtney LeBlanc, 12
- Date: November 15, 2002
- Country: United States
- State: Louisiana

Gerald James Bordelon (February 19, 1962 – January 7, 2010) was an American convicted murderer and sex offender who was executed in Louisiana for murder. Bordelon was sentenced to death for the kidnapping and murder of Courtney LeBlanc, his 12-year-old stepdaughter. Bordelon waived his appeals and asked to be executed, saying he would commit a similar crime again if he was ever given the opportunity. Bordelon was executed at Louisiana State Penitentiary on January 7, 2010, becoming the first person executed in Louisiana since 2002 and the state's first voluntary execution. No further executions would occur in Louisiana for another 15 years, before Jessie Hoffman Jr. was executed by nitrogen hypoxia on March 18, 2025, for the 1996 rape and murder of Molly Elliott.

== Early life ==
Bordelon was born on February 19, 1962, and grew up in Louisiana. He attended schools in the Baton Rouge area and was considered impaired; as a result, he was put in a special resource class. His mother then took him out of school altogether after the principal advised her to. Doctors believed Bordelon suffered from antisocial personality disorder and sexual sadism disorder but had an IQ in the normal range.

On March 17, 1982, Bordelon offered an 18-year-old girl a ride home in his car. After she got in, he pulled out a knife, took her to a house, and forced oral sex on her. In 1982, he pleaded guilty to sexual battery and was sentenced to ten years in prison. On June 14, 1990, he kidnapped another woman at knifepoint, and took her to an abandoned building where he forced oral sex on her and raped her. In 1990, Bordelon was convicted of forcible rape and two counts of aggravated crime against nature and sentenced to 20 years in prison.

== Murder ==
In 2000, Bordelon was released on parole and began working at Delta Concrete. In late 2000, he began communicating over the Internet with a woman named Jennifer Kocke. Despite knowing about his criminal history as a sex offender, Kocke married Bordelon in July 2001. The family then moved to Gloster, Mississippi, in October 2001, living in a trailer on land owned by Bordelon's parents. During Christmas 2001, Kocke's daughters, one of whom was Courtney LeBlanc, told her that Bordelon had molested them. Kocke alerted child protective services in Mississippi, and Bordelon was forced to leave. The couple then separated, and Kocke returned to Louisiana with her family. Despite this, she remained in contact with Bordelon.

On November 15, 2002, 12-year-old Courtney LeBlanc disappeared from her home in Denham Springs, Louisiana. Kocke discovered she was missing when she returned home and immediately called the police. Initially, it was believed that LeBlanc might have just run away from home. As the investigation continued, police were concerned that LeBlanc may have fallen victim to serial killer Derrick Todd Lee, who was operating in the area at the time, but this theory was later dismissed.

Investigation then focused on Bordelon, and he was placed under surveillance. He was questioned by police and eventually admitted to kidnapping and murdering LeBlanc. On November 26, 2002, Bordelon led investigators to LeBlanc's body. He confessed to the murder and said he had abducted LeBlanc from her home with a knife. He took her to Mississippi, where he fondled her and forced her to perform oral sex on him, before driving her back to Louisiana. Upon returning, he strangled her to death on a bank near the Amite River. He then dumped her body in a wooded area in Livingston Parish.

== Trial ==
Bordelon was charged with first-degree murder and second-degree kidnapping for the death of LeBlanc. He was found guilty of first-degree murder on June 29, 2006, and was sentenced to death the following day. After being sentenced, he waived his appeals and asked that his execution be carried out. According to court documents, he said he would commit a similar crime again if he was ever given the opportunity.

In October 2003, Jennifer Kocke was found guilty of felonious child abuse in connection with the murder of LeBlanc. She was sentenced to a suspended five-year term with five years probation.

== Execution ==
On January 7, 2010, Bordelon was executed via lethal injection at Louisiana State Penitentiary in West Feliciana Parish, Louisiana. He was one of three people executed in the United States on that specific day. The others were Vernon Lamont Smith in Ohio and Kenneth Mosley in Texas. They were the first three people to be executed in the United States in 2010. This was the last such occurrence of an execution of three or more inmates on one day in the United States for 16 years until August 13, 2026, when Carlos Cuesta-Rodriguez, Anthony Darrell Dugard Hines, and Jeremy Tremaine Williams were all put to death in Oklahoma, Tennessee, and Alabama respectively.

In Bordelon's last statement, he apologized to LeBlanc's family as well as his own. His last meal was fried sac-a-lait fish, topped with crawfish étouffée, a peanut butter and apple jelly sandwich, and chocolate chip cookies. He was pronounced dead at 6:32 p.m.

Until March 18, 2025, Bordelon was the most recent person to be executed by the state of Louisiana, which went another 15 years without an execution. He was also the first person to have been executed in Louisiana since 2002, when Leslie Dale Martin was executed for murder.

Due to a 2012 lawsuit challenging Louisiana's lethal injection protocol and drug companies not wanting their products associated with capital punishment, Louisiana was unable to carry out executions, despite capital punishment still being a legal penalty. The lawsuit was resolved in 2022 due to the state's inability to procure drugs to conduct lethal injection executions, and in response to this, the government passed laws to revive the electric chair and introduce the new execution method of nitrogen hypoxia as alternative execution methods to lethal injection in March 2024.

On March 18, 2025, 15 years after Bordelon was put to death, Jessie Hoffman Jr., who was found guilty of raping and murdering 28-year-old advertising executive Molly Elliott in 1996, was executed by nitrogen hypoxia, thus marking an end to Louisiana's 15-year moratorium on executions and designating Louisiana as the second state in the United States after Alabama to conduct nitrogen gas executions.

== In popular culture ==
In 2016, Courtney LeBlanc's murder case was featured on the Investigation Discovery series Deadline: Crime with Tamron Hall.

== See also ==
- Capital punishment in Louisiana
- Capital punishment in the United States
- List of people executed in Louisiana
- List of people executed in the United States in 2010
- Volunteer (capital punishment)

Executions carried out in Louisiana
Preceded by Leslie Dale Martin May 10, 2002	Gerald Bordelon; January 7, 2010	Succeeded by Jessie Hoffman Jr. March 18, 2025
Executions carried out in the United States
Preceded by Kenneth Mosley – Texas January 7, 2010	Gerald Bordelon – Louisiana; January 7, 2010	Succeeded by Gary Johnson – Texas January 12, 2010
