= Jessie Hoffman Jr. =

American convicted rapist-killer executed in Louisiana (1978–2025)

- 2024 mugshot
- Born: September 1, 1978; Louisiana, U.S.
- Died: March 18, 2025 (aged 46); Louisiana State Penitentiary, Louisiana, U.S.
- Status: Executed by nitrogen hypoxia
- Motive: Rape; Robbery; Witness elimination
- Conviction: First degree murder
- Penalty: Death (September 11, 1998)

Details
- Victims: 1
- Date: November 26, 1996
- Location: St. Tammany Parish, Louisiana
- Imprisoned at: Louisiana State Penitentiary

Jessie Dean Hoffman Jr. (September 1, 1978 – March 18, 2025) was an American convicted murderer who was sentenced to death in Louisiana for the 1996 rape and murder of Molly Elliott. On November 26, 1996, Hoffman, then 18, abducted the 28-year-old advertising executive in downtown New Orleans. After forcing her to withdraw money from an ATM at gunpoint, he made her drive to a remote area in St. Tammany Parish, where he raped and murdered her.

Hoffman was found guilty of first degree murder and sentenced to death on September 11, 1998. He was executed by nitrogen hypoxia on March 18, 2025, marking Louisiana's first execution in over fifteen years and its first use of nitrogen gas. This followed Alabama's use of the method in the executions of four inmates, starting with Kenneth Eugene Smith in January 2024 and ending with Demetrius Terrence Frazier in February 2025.

Hoffman's execution became a subject of controversy as his lawyers argued that nitrogen hypoxia, an untested method in Louisiana, violated the Eighth Amendment's ban on "cruel and unusual punishment" and infringed on his religious rights. They also pointed to eyewitness accounts of the previous four nitrogen gas executions from Alabama, where inmates gasped and thrashed, challenging claims of a quick death. Although a federal district judge stayed the execution, the 5th Circuit Court of Appeals overturned it, and the U.S. Supreme Court ultimately denied Hoffman's final appeal by a 5–4 majority ruling, leading to Hoffman's execution.

== Personal life ==
Jessie Dean Hoffman Jr. was born in Louisiana on September 1, 1978. Hoffman grew up in a family of five children; one of Hoffman's brothers, Charles Fields, was shot and killed at the age of 25 in New Orleans on May 31, 1998. Hoffman was unmarried, but he had a girlfriend who gave birth to their son sometime after Hoffman was arrested for a 1996 murder case.

According to one of Hoffman's brothers, Marvin Fields, the family was not well-off and at one point, they moved to Florida and settled into a housing development area. At a young age, Hoffman and his siblings were often abused by their mother, who would regularly beat them with strip cuts of a thick belt and also placed their hands on a hot stove until their fingers grew blisters as a punishment for stealing. Despite his troubles at home, Hoffman did well in school as a football player who played quarterback for the school team, and even attained straight A's through the 11th grade, but his grades fell after he began a relationship with his then-girlfriend.

By 1996, Hoffman completed his high school education at Kennedy High School and graduated. He also worked in multiple jobs during high school, including a restaurant worker and inn employee. After his high school graduation, Hoffman went on to work as a carpark valet in New Orleans in November 1996, but less than three weeks after he began his valet job, Hoffman committed the rape and murder that landed him on death row.

== Murder of Molly Elliott ==
On November 26, 1996, Jessie Hoffman Jr., who was two months past his 18th birthday, kidnapped, raped, and murdered a woman in Louisiana.

On that day, 28-year-old advertising executive Mary "Molly" Elliott had just left work and was on her way to retrieve her car at the Sheraton parking garage in downtown New Orleans, where she regularly parked her car for work. Elliott encountered Hoffman in the garage; he was working as a valet at the garage and kidnapped the woman at gunpoint in her own car.

Hoffman forced Elliott to drive to a nearby ATM and withdraw some money. After receiving $200, Hoffman asked Elliott to drive them to a remote area in St. Tammany Parish. After arriving there, Hoffman raped Elliott at gunpoint and made her march to a dirt patch. At the patch itself, Elliott was forced to kneel on a makeshift dock near the Middle Pearl River and Hoffman shot her in the head in an execution-style manner. After killing Elliott, Hoffman left her naked body behind and disposed of her belongings and the murder weapon.

Elliott's body was not found until two days later, on November 28, 1996, Thanksgiving Day. A duck hunter discovered Elliott's corpse and reported the finding to the police. Elliott's husband, who reported his wife missing after she failed to meet him for dinner, identified her later that day. The police also received a report from a couple who found Elliott's clothes and belongings at a vacant lot. Among the objects were three ATM receipts, which were traced back to the same ATM where Elliott withdrew money for Hoffman. The police managed to identify and arrest Hoffman, based on the description of an African-American gunman captured together with Elliott on the photographs taken from the ATM. Hoffman initially denied his involvement in the murder, but he later admitted to the crime.

Background information revealed that Elliott, whose full name was Mary Margaret Murphy Elliott, was born and raised in Phoenix, Arizona, before she completed her college education in southern California and moved to Los Angeles to work in an advertising company. Elliott met her husband Andy Elliott and they moved to the north of New Orleans and settled in Covington, Louisiana, in 1994, and they married in the spring of 1995, just less than two years before her death.

== Murder trial of Hoffman ==
After his arrest, Jessie Hoffman Jr. was charged with first-degree murder. On January 8, 1997, a St. Tammany Parish grand jury indicted Hoffman for the first-degree murder charge. Under Louisiana state law, an offense of first-degree murder carries the death penalty if found guilty.

Subsequently, Hoffman stood trial before a 12-member St. Tammany Parish jury in 1998. It was adduced in trial that Hoffman had used the money he took from Elliott to go shopping with his girlfriend. Based on Hoffman's first statement, he said that after he kidnapped Elliott and had sex with her, which Hoffman claimed to be consensual and not rape, an unknown man armed with a gun walked off with Elliott into the secluded spot at St. Tammany Parish, before he returned alone. He recanted the statement in a later interrogation session, and said that the gun went off accidentally during a struggle with Elliott over the gun, and Elliott died from the shooting as a result.

On June 25, 1998, the jury found Hoffman guilty of first-degree murder as charged. In their plea for mitigation, Hoffman's lawyers contended that Hoffman suffered from chronic childhood abuse and neglect, leading to post-traumatic stress symptoms and brain damage.

On June 27, 1998, two days after his conviction, the same jury returned with their verdict on sentence, recommending the death penalty for Hoffman.

On September 11, 1998, Hoffman was formally sentenced to death by the trial court, in accordance to the jury's recommendation. Two months later, Hoffman was officially transferred to death row at the Louisiana State Penitentiary on November 11, 1998.

== Appeals and subsequent developments ==
=== Regular appeals ===
On April 11, 2000, the Louisiana Supreme Court dismissed Jessie Hoffman's appeal. On October 16, 2000, the U.S. Supreme Court rejected Hoffman's appeal. On March 30, 2012, a federal judge turned down Hoffman's federal habeas petition without a hearing. On May 12, 2014, the 5th U.S. Circuit Court of Appeals rejected Hoffman's appeal. On January 20, 2015, Hoffman's final appeal and petition for a writ of certiorari was denied by the U.S. Supreme Court, which thereby confirmed his death sentence.

On October 19, 2021, the Louisiana Supreme Court rejected another appeal from Hoffman. In the appeal, Hoffman alleged in his grounds of appeal that the validity of his conviction was breached by racial discrimination given that the jury that convicted him consisted of all 12 White jurors, and that his age of 18 made it manifestly excessive for him to receive a death sentence. The court rejected his claims of racial bias and also found that there was no tangible evidence of any consensus of against executing people under the age of 21, and dismissed his other points of appeal as well.

=== Lawsuit against execution protocols ===
On December 22, 2012, Hoffman filed a lawsuit against the state's lethal injection protocols, on the basis that its protocols were constituted as "cruel and unusual punishment" and that the state breached his constitutional rights. While the lawsuit was ongoing, the state suspended the execution warrant of another death row inmate Christopher Sepulvado, who was originally scheduled to be executed on February 13, 2013; Sepulvado was allowed to join as a co-plaintiff in Hoffman's lawsuit thereafter.

Subsequently, a second lawsuit was filed by both Hoffman and Sepulvado against the state's lethal injection protocols in 2014, after the Louisiana prison authorities decided to switch to a new double-drug combination (midazolam and hydromorphone) in a second attempt to carry out Sepulvado's execution, which was re-scheduled to happen in February 2014. The execution was delayed while the lawsuit was pending in the courts, with the plaintiffs arguing that such a combination could give rise to the possibility of cruel and unusual punishment and violating their constitutional rights. At that time, Louisiana and several other states made amendments to their lethal injection protocols due to the European drugmakers' decision to stop exporting their barbiturates and sedatives to the U.S for lethal injection executions in the death penalty states, which in turn led to the shortage of lethal injection drugs in these states.

On April 3, 2022, U.S. District Judge Shelly Dick dismissed the lawsuit challenging Louisiana's lethal injection protocols, nearly a decade after it was first filed. The court ruled that the plaintiffs lacked standing to challenge the protocols due to the state's inability to secure the necessary drugs for lethal injections. Among the plaintiffs was Hoffman, one of the ten or so condemned inmates involved in the case.

=== Clemency petition and other developments ===
In 2023, Louisiana Governor John Bel Edwards, who was nearing the end of his term, publicly announced for the first time that he opposed the death penalty and had been advocating for its abolition in the state. However, on May 24, 2023, the majority of lawmakers rejected a bill to end capital punishment in Louisiana. A month later, in June 2023, 56 out of 57 death row inmates, including Hoffman, filed petitions for clemency, hoping to benefit from Edwards' stance. These petitions were to be reviewed by the Louisiana Board of Pardons and Committee on Parole.

In July 2023, however, the Board rejected all 56 clemency petitions, determining that the inmates were ineligible as they had been filed too soon after recent judicial rulings on appeals (clemency petitions could only be submitted at least a year after the ruling of an inmate's final appeals). Later, in October 2023, further clemency appeals from five death row inmates, including Antoinette Frank, were also denied by the Board.

In March 2024, Governor Jeff Landry, who succeeded Edwards, signed a bill into law that authorized the use of nitrogen hypoxia and the electric chair as alternative execution methods, in addition to lethal injection. This legislation followed the 2024 execution of Kenneth Eugene Smith in Alabama, the first person executed by nitrogen hypoxia in the U.S. and the world. Louisiana had observed a 14-year moratorium on executions since the state last carried out the execution of Gerald Bordelon (who raped and killed his stepdaughter) in 2010, due to difficulties in obtaining lethal injection drugs and the refusal of drug companies to supply them for execution purposes. Family members of murder victims, whose killers were on death row, expressed support for the new bill allowing these alternative execution methods.

== Execution warrant and final appeals ==
=== Death warrant ===
In early February 2025, Louisiana Attorney General Liz Murrill announced that the state would resume executions using nitrogen hypoxia, a method recently legalized in Louisiana. This execution method had previously been used by Alabama to execute four prisoners between January 2024 and February 2025. Louisiana Governor Jeff Landry also confirmed the decision to resume executions, emphasizing the state's commitment to delivering justice to crime victims after a 15-year hiatus. The first group of inmates targeted for execution included Jessie Hoffman, Christopher Sepulvado, and Larry Roy. Murrill also added that the state is expected to conduct at least four executions this year in 2025.

On February 12, 2025, Judge Alan Zaunbrecher of the 22nd Judicial District signed a death warrant for Jessie Hoffman, scheduling his execution for March 18, 2025. Hoffman, was set to be executed just one day after Christopher Sepulvado, who was condemned for the 1992 torture and killing of his stepson, and both men were the first two inmates set to be put to death in Louisiana after the state's 15-year pause on executions. Larry Roy's execution, originally set for March 19, 2025 (a day after Hoffman's), was later canceled after it was revealed that Roy had not exhausted all his appeals related to his 1994 conviction for the double murder of Freddie Richard Jr. and Rosetta Silas. The death warrant of Hoffman was the third issued that month for a Louisiana death row inmate (Roy and Sepulvado received their death warrants earlier than Hoffman during the same week).

=== Final appeals ===
==== Execution protocol lawsuit ====
A week after the scheduling of Hoffman's execution, his legal team prepared to challenge Louisiana's decision to use nitrogen hypoxia in federal court. Hoffman's case, along with Sepulvado's, led to the revival of a lawsuit questioning the state's new execution protocols. U.S. District Judge Shelly Dick stated that the untested method of nitrogen hypoxia needed further examination, a decision Louisiana Attorney General Liz Murrill vowed to appeal.

Merely days after the revival of the lawsuit, 81-year-old Christopher Sepulvado died of natural causes while on death row. Given Sepulvado's sudden death before his execution, Hoffman was the only remaining person with a confirmed execution date in Louisiana. As a result, he became the first condemned person in Louisiana put to death since 2010, as well as the first in Louisiana to be put to death by nitrogen hypoxia.

On February 24, 2025, the 5th U.S. Circuit Court of Appeals halted Judge Dick's ruling, after Attorney General Murrill appealed to overturn it, arguing that it could potentially set a bad precedent for other challenges to the constitutionality of Louisiana laws in the district. This enabled Hoffman's execution date to remain in schedule.

Hoffman's lawyer Cecelia Kappel lodged an appeal to challenge Louisiana's nitrogen gas execution protocols. In a media statement, Kappel criticized the state for deploying the method of nitrogen hypoxia to execute prisoners when it was banned from being used to conduct the euthanasia of animals, and stated that the untested method of nitrogen hypoxia should be reviewed by the courts. Hoffman's counsel also claimed that Hoffman was being selected as a "test case" for the nitrogen hypoxia method.

==== Clemency efforts ====
Several family members of Hoffman appealed for mercy on his behalf. Hoffman's older brother, Marvin Fields, stated that the crime came as a shock to him, especially since Hoffman was recently graduated from Kennedy High School and began working as a valet at the parking lot where Elliott often parked her car. Fields stated that his brother was never a violent person and since young, their mother (who died in 2024) often would beat her four children (including Hoffman), and their family was not very well-off. Fields stated that he hoped for his brother to be given a second chance and stated that Hoffman was feeling sorry for his family for making them suffer from the impact of his crimes. Hoffman's son, who was born after his father was arrested for killing Elliott, stated that his father was still calm and his demeanour did not change in spite of his impending death.

On March 18, 2025, hours before Hoffman was executed, the sister-in-law of Molly Elliott (Hoffman's victim) asked the governor to spare the life of Hoffman and commute his death sentence to life without parole, saying that the death of Hoffman would not provide closure to her.

==== Federal appeals ====
U.S. District Court for the Middle District of Louisiana

On March 8, 2025, Hoffman submitted in an appeal to the U.S. District Court for the Middle District of Louisiana that his death sentence should not be carried out by nitrogen gas and asked for a more humane method of execution, with Hoffman suggesting a firing squad or assisted suicide. His lawyers argued that nitrogen hypoxia amounted to "cruel and unusual punishment" under the Constitution and since Hoffman himself was Buddhist, the manner of execution breached the teachings of Buddhism, specifically the meditation and breathing exercises, and could bring about psychological trauma. Hoffman's lawyers also asked for more transparency by revealing the crucial information pertaining to the nitrogen gas execution protocol.

It was revealed in court that Hoffman had post-traumatic stress disorder and claustrophobia, which were caused by the childhood abuse and the past times where his mother locked him in a pantry as a child, and Hoffman relied on these meditation techniques to cope with these conditions, and he feared that having a mask over his face might induce a panic attack and made him unable to use the meditation skills to calm himself down.

In response, the prosecution submitted that the method was already in use in Alabama for executions since 2024 and there were no major problems observed in these cases, where the prisoners died of seemingly painless deaths.

On March 11, 2025, U.S. District Judge Shelly Dick issued a stay of execution for Hoffman, although Attorney General Liz Murrill confirmed that she would appeal the decision.

5th U.S. Circuit Court of Appeals

Attorney-General Murrill lodged an emergency appeal to the 5th U.S. Circuit Court of Appeals the next day. She argued that Judge Dick erred in ruling in favor of Hoffman, in which her judgment ruled that nitrogen hypoxia amounted to "cruel and unusual punishment." Attorney-General Murrill submitted that the state of Alabama had practiced the use of nitrogen hypoxia in four previous executions, and the state and federal courts had found no error in these Alabama cases, and Dick's ruling essentially contradicted the precedent cases. In her further submissions, Murrill also said that the legal challenges filed by Hoffman's lawyers were an attempt to delay the course of justice and pointed that the U.S. Supreme Court had repeatedly upheld the constitutionality of executions by nitrogen hypoxia in the past.

On March 14, 2025, the 5th U.S. Circuit Court of Appeals ruled in favor of Murrill, and overturned Dick's ruling, stating it "contravened the Supreme Court precedent." Judge James C. Ho and Judge Andrew Oldham agreed to overturn the stay while Judge Catharina Haynes dissented; Judge Ho and Judge Oldham stated that they believed firing squad could inflict greater pain to Hoffman compared to nitrogen hypoxia and while there were differing interpretations of what would have been in violation of the Eighth Amendment that banned cruel and unusual punishments, the state need not necessarily opt for more painful execution methods over the less painful ones. Judge Haynes, on the other hand, stated that the matter should be scrutinized more and it would be impossible if Hoffman was executed.

In the majority opinion, Judge Ho pointed out that Judge Dick placed undue reliance on the evidence of the defense's hypoxia expert Dr. Philip Bickler in her own ruling, and he cited that based on the prosecution's expert anesthesiologist Dr. Joseph Antognini, nitrogen hypoxia did not involve suffering and pain, and he quoted, "Breathing 100% pure nitrogen causes unconsciousness in less than a minute, with death following rapidly within ten to fifteen minutes." Judge Ho also noted that the nitrogen gas execution protocols of Louisiana were largely modelled after Alabama's nitrogen gas execution protocols.

With the stay order overturned, Hoffman's upcoming execution date of March 18, 2025, was restored. Hoffman's lawyers planned to pursue a final appeal to the U.S. Supreme Court.

U.S. Supreme Court

In their submissions to the U.S. Supreme Court, Hoffman's lawyers argued that his execution by nitrogen hypoxia would be unconstitutional as it would violate his Eighth Amendment right against cruel and unusual punishment, as well as his First Amendment right to religious freedom because forcing him to breathe pure nitrogen could interfere with his Buddhist practices and meditation breathing during his transition between life and death; and, as a result, they instead suggested that Hoffman's death sentence be carried out in a more humane manner like assisted suicide drugs or firing squad, neither of which were legal in Louisiana.

On March 18, 2025–the date of Hoffman's scheduled execution–the U.S. Supreme Court dismissed Hoffman's final appeal by a 5–4 majority vote, thus allowing Louisiana to proceed with the execution.

U.S. District Court for the Middle District of Louisiana (second time)

Hours before the scheduled execution, Hoffman's lawyers petitioned U.S. District Judge Shelly Dick for an order to require that the execution be publicly live-streamed so as to clear up conflicting witness accounts from the previous nitrogen gas executions in Alabama regarding the inmate gasps for air and involuntary movements that allegedly occurred. This petition was rejected shortly after.

U.S. District Court for the Eastern District of Louisiana

Immediately thereafter, still just hours before the scheduled execution, Hoffman's lawyers once again petitioned for judicial intervention, but this time from the U.S. District Court for the Eastern District of Louisiana, on the basis that there was racial bias against Hoffman as an African-American given that his death sentence was passed down by an all-white jury, which, they argued, warranted a stay of Hoffman's execution to allow the court time to conduct an evidentiary hearing into the matter.

U.S. District Court Judge Ivan L. R. Lemelle denied Hoffman's request and dismissed the petition.

==== State appeals ====
On March 17, 2025, Hoffman's state appeal to cancel his execution was rejected by the Louisiana Supreme Court. Hoffman's lawyers argued that, under state law, Hoffman was entitled to have the execution date set on a later date because his federal injunction was initially granted, albeit briefly before being dissolved on appeal. However, the Louisiana Supreme Court pointed out such requests could only be granted if the execution was actually delayed, and given that the stay of execution was overturned following the dismissal of Hoffman's federal injunction, there was no valid grounds to set a new execution date and hence, the original execution date of March 18, 2025, remained valid.

Despite so, Hoffman's lawyers continued to appeal numerous times to stop the execution. A Baton Rouge district judge heard another appeal on the morning of March 18, 2025. A temporary restraining order was also imposed to disallow the Louisiana Department of Corrections from executing Hoffman (whose execution date remained effective), but the order would expire an hour after the starting time of the hearing. The appeal, in the end, was rejected by the judge.

On that same day, a second appeal was filed to the Louisiana Supreme Court for another stay of execution, but the court rejected it in a majority ruling of 5–2.

=== Reactions ===
Members of the Jewish community in Louisiana, including survivors of the Holocaust, protested against the upcoming use of nitrogen gas for executions and also opposed the scheduled execution of Hoffman. They argued that the use of nitrogen gas evoked the Holocaust, which led to the massacre of six million Jews in Nazi Germany, and half of these victims perished in the lethal gas chambers at Auschwitz and many other concentration camps. The protestors also stated that implementing this method to execute a convicted murderer in the name of justice made it equally abhorrent as the use of lethal gas inhalation had an intrinsic link to "the decimation of (Jewish) people" during World War II.

In response to the scheduled execution of Hoffman, Andy Elliott, the husband of the victim Mary Elliott stated that he only wanted the process to come to an end, and while declining to show any support or opposition to the execution, Andy added that the execution of Hoffman would not give him closure but at least some resolution and a sense of finality. Andy expressed his gratitude to Governor Landry for his drive to fulfill the ends of justice and recalled having a personal conversation with Landry about the death penalty, and confirmed he would not attend the execution. It was revealed that after losing his wife (whom he married in 1995), Andy had since remarried with three children.

On March 15, 2025, Louisiana religious leaders gathered outside the State Capitol and protested against the execution of Hoffman, and urged Governor Landry to stop any upcoming executions, claiming that they sympathized with the families of murder victims but argued that forgiveness and mercy should be given to even the worst of criminals, and that only God should make the final judgment.

Generally, there were divided responses among Louisiana's religious leaders, as there are others who supported capital punishment and it was permissible by Christianity to sentence people to the appropriate penalty (including death) if their crimes were heinous enough, and some of the Jewish people and faith leaders also supported certain forms of capital punishment despite their opposition to nitrogen gas (as directly linked to the Holocaust). One of the leaders, expressing his support for the death penalty, cited that there are certain crimes that were so heinous that the convict had effectively forfeited his/her right to live. Also, despite the public's divisive stance towards the death penalty, a majority of the public in Louisiana continued to support capital punishment.

On March 16, 2025, a crowd consisting of Hoffman's family members and supporters gathered outside the mansion of Governor Landry, and appealed to the governor to grant clemency to Hoffman and halt his execution.

On March 17, 2025, the eve of Hoffman's execution, Elliott's husband Andy once again accepted an interview. Andy stated that the death of his late wife marked the loss of "cherished person who missed out on motherhood, a promising and successful career, and a life in the country on the property (the Elliotts) bought together" and the loss of a great human being to a senseless crime. Declining to express his stance towards the death penalty, Andy reaffirmed that the execution of Hoffman or the commutation of his death sentence would not be a sign of closure for him, but he only wanted the process to end regardless of whichever outcome the case concluded with, although he agreed with the execution of Hoffman if it could, in the easiest way, bring an end to all the uncertainties that revolved around the case after 29 years since the rape and murder of his late wife.

On the afternoon of March 18, 2025, hours before Hoffman was slated to be executed, Hoffman's sister and anti-death penalty advocates conducted a protest outside Louisiana State Penitentiary, where the state's executions were conducted. A vigil was also conducted outside the prison, and Hoffman's Buddhist adviser was one of the vigil's participants.

== Execution ==
=== Nitrogen hypoxia ===
On March 18, 2025, 46-year-old Jessie Hoffman was put to death by nitrogen hypoxia at the Louisiana State Penitentiary.

Before his execution, Hoffman declined to make a final statement and also chose to not eat a special last meal. Hoffman was reportedly escorted into the execution chamber at 6:12 pm. The prison officials released the gas for about 19 minutes, and Hoffman was pronounced dead at 6:50 pm. One state official acknowledged that during the execution procedure, Hoffman made some convulsive movements before he became motionless, but the execution largely went smoothly based on other eyewitness accounts.

Hoffman became the first inmate to be executed in Louisiana following the state's 15-year moratorium on capital punishment. Additionally, Hoffman was the first person in Louisiana and the fifth overall to be executed by nitrogen hypoxia, a new technique that debuted in Alabama for the execution of Kenneth Eugene Smith in 2024. With this execution, Louisiana became the second state in the U.S. to carry out executions using nitrogen gas.

Hoffman was one of the four inmates scheduled to be executed in a period of three days from March 18 to 20, 2025. The other three were: Aaron Gunches of Arizona (March 19, 2025), Edward Thomas James of Florida (March 20, 2025), and Wendell Grissom of Oklahoma (March 20, 2025).

=== Responses and aftermath ===
In a statement issued after Hoffman's execution, Governor Jeff Landry expressed his support for the execution, stating that the state of Louisiana would not tolerate "heinous acts of violence" and affirmed the authorities' stand to prioritize "victims over criminals, law and order over lawlessness, and justice over the status quo."

On the other hand, Cecelia Koppel, one of Hoffman's lawyers, condemned the execution and called it "senseless," stating that Hoffman was no longer the cold-blooded murderer who took the life of Molly Elliott back in 1996, and his life ended as a reformed "father, a husband, and a man who showed extraordinary capacity for redemption."

Andy Elliott, the widower of Molly Elliott, released a statement after the execution. He stated that the news of Hoffman's execution was bittersweet, but he added that he was relieved that the long nightmare was finally put to an end, even though it renewed the grief for him and Elliott's family. Andy also said that this execution brought sadness for Hoffman's family, who also went through the same "gut-wrenching" ordeal as him for nearly 30 years through no fault of their own but Hoffman's. Additionally, Andy expressed his gratitude to Governor Landry for his unwavering commitment to resolving the death penalty cases and concluding his wife's case, as well as both Colin Sims and Assistant District Attorney Ronnie Gracianette for defending the death penalty against Hoffman's multiple appeals and updating him on his wife's case. He also hoped that the execution of Hoffman could lead to meaningful change to the capital punishment system and ensure that the death penalty process could be resolved within a reasonable period of time, citing that decades of waiting could potentially downplay the deterrent effect of capital punishment and bring about emotional difficulties to the people involved.

Hoffman's wife Ilona, who married her husband during his imprisonment, paid a tribute to him in her own media statement. She described him as a beautiful soul and a man of "love, wisdom, and redemption" who inspired many around him, stating that it should not be defined by the crime he committed back in 1996. Hoffman's wife stated that the system failed her husband for not intervening when he needed help (including his childhood abuse) and ultimately executing him. Ilona added that instead of execution, which she viewed as a sign of vengeance, it was true justice to recognise "growth, humanity, and redemption."

In the aftermath, Hoffman's execution paved way to the possibility of more executions in Louisiana, and several were in line for imminent execution, like Larry Roy, the "Cheneyville Slasher" who killed two people in 1993; Darrell James Robinson, who killed a family of four in 1996; and Tracy Lee, a former soldier who killed 15-year-old Rohn Blackston in 1985 and raped Blackston's mother and sister during a home invasion. By the end of 2025, of all the 47 inmates executed in the United States, which marked the highest number of executions in 16 years, Hoffman was the only individual on Louisiana's death row to be executed that same year.

== See also ==
- Capital punishment in Louisiana
- List of most recent executions by jurisdiction
- List of people executed in Louisiana
- List of people executed in the United States in 2025

Executions by nitrogen hypoxia in the United States
Preceded by Demetrius Terrence Frazier – Alabama February 6, 2025	Jessie Hoffman Jr. – Louisiana; March 18, 2025	Succeeded by Gregory Hunt – Alabama June 10, 2025
Executions carried out in Louisiana
Preceded by Gerald Bordelon January 7, 2010	Jessie Hoffman Jr. March 18, 2025	Succeeded by most recent
Executions carried out in the United States
Preceded by Brad Sigmon – South Carolina March 7, 2025	Jessie Hoffman Jr. – Louisiana; March 18, 2025	Succeeded by Aaron Gunches – Arizona March 19, 2025
