= Capital punishment in Louisiana =

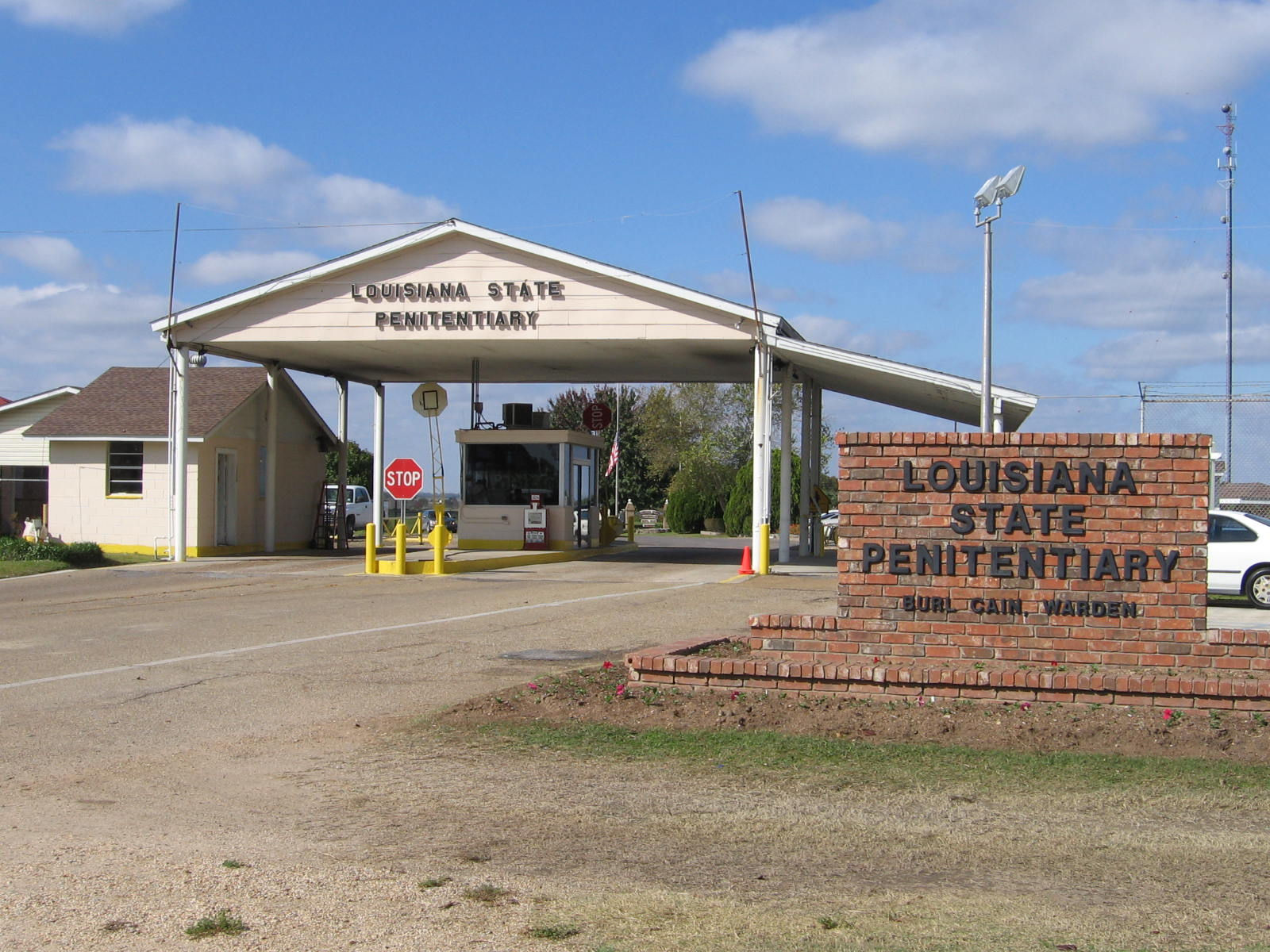
Louisiana State Penitentiary is the location of the State of Louisiana's male death row and execution chamber

Capital punishment is a legal penalty in the U.S. state of Louisiana.

The most recent execution in Louisiana was of Jessie Hoffman Jr. in 2025; Hoffman, convicted of murder and rape, was the first person executed in the state in 15 years, and the first person to be executed by nitrogen hypoxia in Louisiana. The hiatus in executions had occurred due to the fact that execution protocols became tied up in litigation due to a 2012 lawsuit challenging Louisiana's lethal injection procedures. In addition, pharmaceutical companies and manufacturers did not sell the state lethal injection drugs due to an absence of a secrecy provision in Louisiana law until 2024. Despite this, a 2018 survey by the Louisiana State University found that a majority of Louisiana residents support capital punishment.

On March 5, 2024, Governor Jeff Landry signed a law allowing executions to be carried out via nitrogen hypoxia and electrocution, in addition to lethal injection; the law paved the way for executions to resume. Almost a year later, on February 10, 2025, Landry announced that the state had finalized its new execution protocol, allowing executions to resume in Louisiana by nitrogen hypoxia after a 15-year hiatus.

The lethal injection involves an injection directly into the veins of a substance or group of substances that are lethal at the particular dose that is injected. The electrocution method involves an electric current that is strong enough to kill a person to be passed through the inmate being executed continuously until the inmate is dead.

The state of Louisiana has performed sixty-five executions before the year 1976 and twenty-nine executions since 1976. There have been a total of twelve exonerations from death row and there is currently a population of fifty-seven inmates serving time on death row.

Every death sentence that is passed in the state of Louisiana is executed at the Louisiana State penitentiary at Angola. All executions are conducted in private rooms that are completely cut off from everyone except for those who are legally permitted to witness the execution. Those who are permitted and mandated by law to be present for each execution is either the Warden or a competent person chosen by the warden of the Louisiana State Penitentiary at Angola, the coroner or the deputy of the coroner of West Feliciana, a physician that is summoned by the warden, a competent person selected by the warden to carry out the chosen method of execution, a spiritual advisor if the convict so wishes, or other witnesses that are determined by the secretary of the Department of Public Safety and Corrections.

In regards to intellectual disabilities of convicted criminals who would otherwise be seen as worthy candidates of the death penalty, the decision of whether or not to pass the death penalty is decided by the jury during the penalty phase that follows a first degree murder conviction.

== History ==
After Louisiana became a state, initially all executions were carried out locally by hanging. In 1910, the state government centralized hangings at the state penitentiary in Baton Rouge, but decentralized back to parish prisons in 1918. In 1941, the official method of execution was changed to electrocution, with the electric chair being transported to parish prisons to continue local executions until 1957, when an official execution chamber was created at the current state penitentiary. Electrocution was replaced by lethal injection in 1991.

Following an execution in 2002, there was an eight-year hiatus. Then there was a single execution in 2010, followed by a 15-year-hiatus.

One famous U.S. Supreme Court case regarding the death penalty in Louisiana was that of Connick v. Thompson, 563 U.S. 51 (2011). John Thompson was convicted of both robbery and murder and spent a total of 18 years in prison, including 14 years on death row. It later was discovered by an investigator right before the date of Thompson's scheduled execution that the prosecutors had withheld and hidden away blood evidence that eventually exonerated him. Thompson filed a lawsuit against the New Orleans district attorney's office including the district attorney Harry Connick and other officials employed there. Thompson received $14 million in compensation. The justices of the U.S. Supreme Court then ruled in a five to four ruling that a whole prosecutors office could not be held responsible for the illegal actions of one of their prosecutors in a one off incident.

Kennedy v. Louisiana, 554 US 407 (2008) was another significant case in the history of capital punishment in Louisiana as well as the United States. What this case did was it prohibited the death penalty from being implemented for all offences that were non homicidal. It was decided in a five to four decision via the Supreme Court that states could not execute people convicted for the rape of a child in cases that did not result in the child’s death. The majority consensus that applying the death penalty to cases such as this would constitute “cruel and unusual punishment.”

In the year 1976 there was the case of Roberts v. Louisiana, 428 U.S. 325 (1976) which was one of five death penalty cases in which the U.S. Supreme Court reached a decision on July 2, 1976, that the death penalty did not invariably meet the requirements of cruel and unusual punishment. Despite this, however, the Court did declare that Louisiana’s statute on capital punishment, which made executions required for certain types of murder, was unconstitutional due to the fact that it did not account for mitigating factors or exercises of mercy to spare the life of the defendant.

1977 was the year in which the U.S. Supreme Court took up another case called Harry Roberts v. Louisiana, 431 U.S. 633 (1977) in order to determine whether or not a mandatory death sentence could be imposed in the context of convicting the murderer of a law enforcement officer who is murdered while performing their duties. In a five to four ruling it was decided that the prohibition against mandated death sentences included the murders of law enforcement officers.

Curtis Kyles was a man who in 1984 was convicted and sentenced to death after his first case ended in a hung jury. This conviction was completely reversed by the U.S. Supreme Court in 1995 in the case Kyles v. Whitley, 514 U.S. 419 (1995). The Supreme Court found and cited evidence of misconduct on the behalf of the prosecution. What happened was that it was discovered that the state of Louisiana withheld very crucial information about a paid informant who was suspected of being the one who had actually committed the crime. It took five trials for the prosecutors to actually drop the charges that they had against Kyles and he was later released from prison in 1998.

== Legal process ==
When the prosecution seeks the death penalty, the sentence is decided by the jury and must be unanimous.

In case of a hung jury during the penalty phase of the trial, a life sentence is issued, even if a single juror opposed death (there is no retrial).

The governor may commute death sentences with advice and consent of the Louisiana Board of Pardons and Parole. The governor doesn't need such consent for issuing a mere stay of execution.

The male death row is at the Louisiana State Penitentiary in West Feliciana Parish. The female death row is at Louisiana Correctional Institute for Women in St. Gabriel in Iberville Parish. Executions in Louisiana are currently performed at the Louisiana State Penitentiary.

The method of execution is selected at the discretion of the secretary of the Department of Public Safety and Corrections among lethal injection, nitrogen hypoxia and electrocution.

== Capital crimes ==
First degree murder is punishable by death when it involves any of the following aggravating factors:

1. The offender was engaged in the perpetration or attempted perpetration of aggravated or first degree rape, forcible or second degree rape, aggravated kidnapping, second degree kidnapping, aggravated burglary, aggravated arson, aggravated escape, assault by drive-by shooting, armed robbery, first degree robbery, second degree robbery, simple robbery, cruelty to juveniles, second degree cruelty to juveniles, or terrorism.
2. The victim was a fireman or peace officer engaged in his lawful duties.
3. The offender has been previously convicted of an unrelated murder, aggravated or first degree rape, aggravated burglary, aggravated arson, aggravated escape, armed robbery, or aggravated kidnapping.
4. The offender knowingly created a risk of death or great bodily harm to more than one person.
5. The offender offered or has been offered or has given or received anything of value for the commission of the offense.
6. The offender at the time of the commission of the offense was imprisoned after sentence for the commission of an unrelated forcible felony.
7. The offense was committed in an especially heinous, atrocious or cruel manner.
8. The victim was a witness in a prosecution against the defendant, gave material assistance to the state in any investigation or prosecution of the defendant, or was an eye witness to a crime alleged to have been committed by the defendant or possessed other material evidence against the defendant.
9. The victim was a correctional officer or any employee of the Department of Public Safety and Corrections who, in the normal course of his employment was required to come in close contact with persons incarcerated in a state prison facility, and the victim was engaged in his lawful duties at the time of the offense.
10. The victim was under the age of 12 years or at least 65 years of age.
11. The offender was engaged in the distribution, exchange, sale, or purchase, or any attempt thereof, of a controlled dangerous substance.
12. The offender was engaged in ritualistic acts.
13. The offender has knowingly killed two or more persons in a series of separate incidents.

Treason is also a capital crime in Louisiana. The state formerly also allowed execution for the aggravated rape of a victim under the age of 12. The Supreme Court, however, ruled it unconstitutional on June 25, 2008 in Kennedy v. Louisiana, saying "there is a distinction between intentional first-degree murder on the one hand and nonhomicide crimes against individual persons".

== Notable cases ==
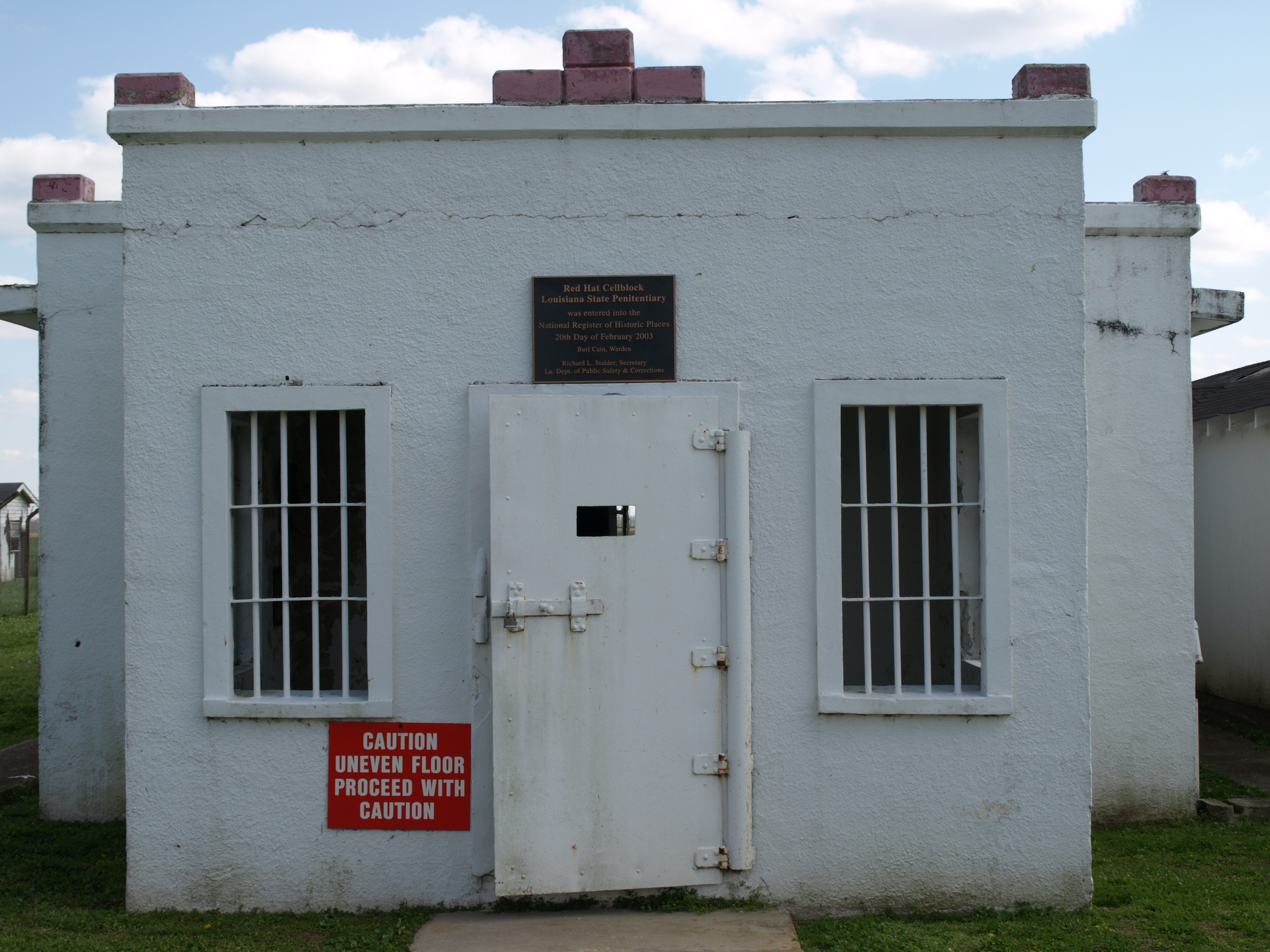
Red Hat Cell Block, a deactivated prisoner housing unit at Angola that formerly housed death row and the execution chamber

On August 29, 2009—the fourth anniversary of Hurricane Katrina—a jury in Orleans Parish sentenced Michael Anderson to death on each of five counts of first degree murder for his execution style shooting of five teenagers on June 17, 2006. The quintuple slaying, which occurred as the nation watched New Orleans begin to rebuild in the aftermath of the storm, drew national attention to the violent crime problems plaguing the city and prompted then-Governor Kathleen Blanco to call in the Louisiana National Guard to help the New Orleans Police Department patrol the streets of the city. The sentence was especially significant as it marked the first time in twelve years that an Orleans Parish jury had sent a person to the state's death row at the Louisiana State Penitentiary in Angola. The sentence was later commuted to life and then reduced further after Anderson's cooperation with federal prosecutors.

On March 18, 2025, Jessie Hoffman Jr., a former parking lot valet who was found guilty of raping and murdering 28-year-old advertising executive Molly Elliott in 1996, was executed by nitrogen hypoxia, making him the first prisoner in Louisiana to be executed by this method, as well as the first person executed in Louisiana after a 15-year moratorium on executions since 2010.

== See also ==
- List of people executed in Louisiana
- List of people executed in Louisiana (pre-1972)
- List of death row inmates in the United States § Louisiana
- Crime in Louisiana
- Law of Louisiana
