= Coal mines and saltworks of Gouhenans =

Complex of mines and factories in eastern France

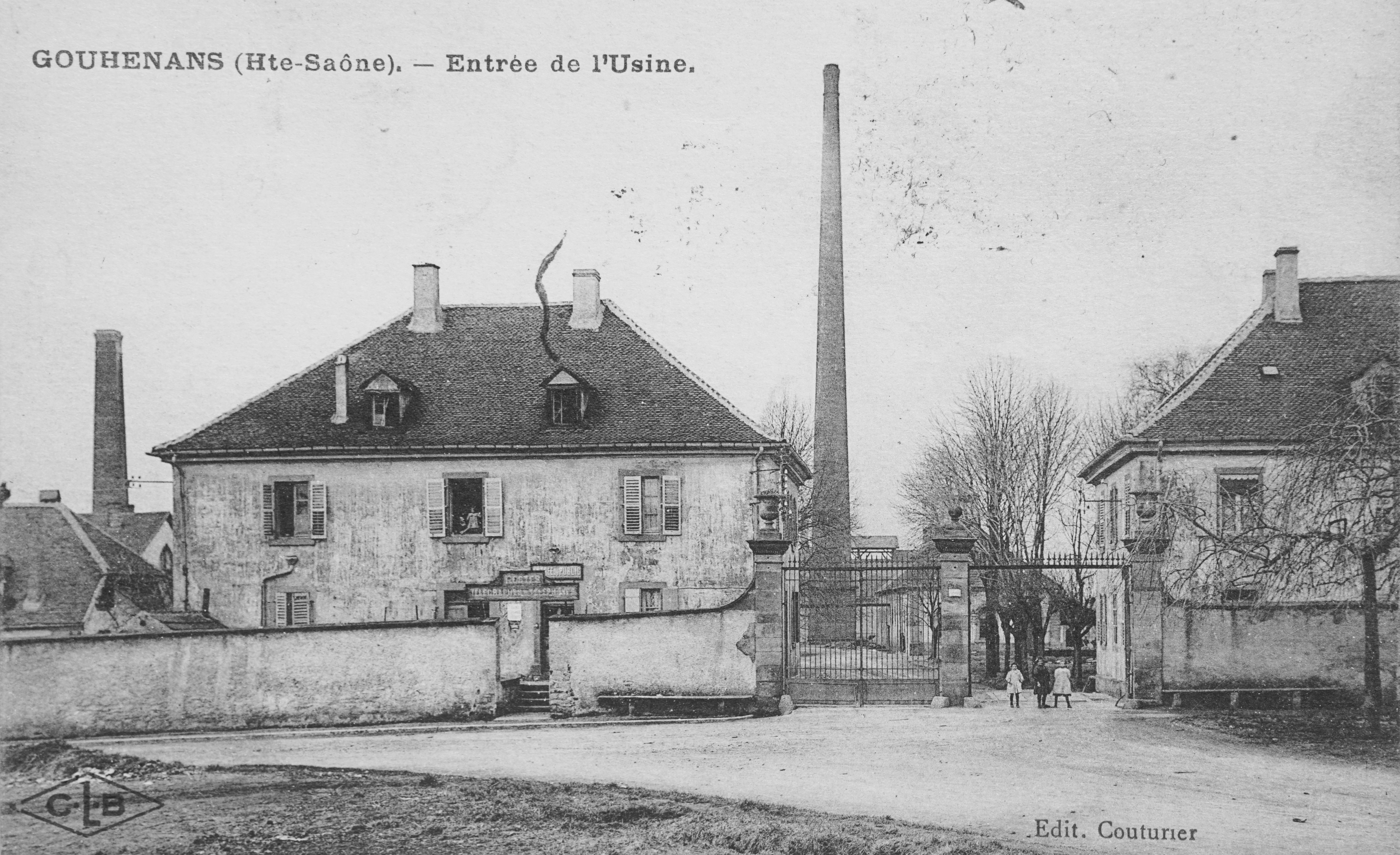
- Entrance to the Gouhenans saltworks.
- Founded: 1828
- Defunct: 1912 (glass); 1921 (coal); 1945 (salt); 1955 (chemicals)
- Headquarters: Gouhenans, France
- Products: Black coal, halite, glass and chemical products
- Parent: 1828–1850: Parmentier, Grillet et Cie; 1850–1894: Salines domaniales de l'Est; 1894–1912: Compagnie Anonyme des Salines, Houillères et Fabrique de produits chimiques de Gouhenans; 1912–1945: Société Minière et Industrielle de Gouhenans 1927–1955: Établissements Kuhlmann

The coal mines and saltworks of Gouhenans constitute a complex of mines and factories situated in eastern France. They have been engaged in the exploitation and processing of rock salt and pyrite since 1831 and coal since 1828. These resources are situated in the same geological layer of the Keuper Basin. The coal deposit was first identified in the 1770s and is situated beneath the communes of Gouhenans, Athesans, and Villafans in the Haute-Saône department, in Bourgogne-Franche-Comté. The discovery of salt occurred concurrently with the onset of coal mining operations. The use of locally mined coal for the evaporation of brine enabled the company to reduce the cost of production of salt. The industrial complex was further expanded with the addition of a chemical factory and glassworks, which contributed to a period of economic growth and prosperity in Gouhenans. In 1927, the Kuhlmann group acquired the chemical activity, which remained under their ownership until the facility's closure in 1955.

In 1847, the salt industry was embroiled in a scandal involving prominent political figures of the July Monarchy, General Despans-Cubières, and Jean-Baptiste Teste, a peer of France and Minister of State.

The vestiges of these industrial activities (mine entrances, spoil heaps, railways, ruins, company town, repurposed buildings, flue-gas stack, and lindane deposits) persist in the early 21st century. The region continues to be shaped economically, socially, scenically, ecologically, and culturally. In 2009, the hiking trail "The Way of Salt and Coal" was established to draw attention to this industrial heritage.

== Location ==
The concession encompasses 1,378 hectares for coal exploitation and 688 hectares for salt, distributed across the communes of Gouhenans, Longevelle, Les Aynans, Athesans, Le Val, and Villafans, situated in the southeastern region of the Haute-Saône department within the Bourgogne-Franche-Comté region.

== Geology ==
The formation of the Keuper salt and coal deposit in Franche-Comté.

The coal and halite deposits are intermingled within the Keuper coal basin of Haute-Saône. The basin is composed of alternating layers of sandstone, variegated marl, and gypsum dolomites.

The salt deposit comprises six layers with a total thickness of 22 meters, found at depths between 51 and 107 meters.

== Saltworks ==
=== Neolithic ===
Archaeological evidence indicates that salt was extracted in the commune during the Neolithic era, with the earliest known instances of this practice occurring between 4821 and 4534 BC.

=== Discovery ===
In 1828, during the exploitation of the coal deposit, a seven-to-eight-meter-thick layer of rock salt was discovered. The initial exploitation request was rejected, and despite subsequent appeals to the courts in Lure, Besançon, and the Council of State, the situation remained unchanged. Consequently, the saltworks were constructed illegally at the site known as Les Époisses. The factory employed the ignigenous process, using brine cooking in stoves. Ultimately, the royal ordinance of 3 January 1843, granted the Parmentier, Grillet and Co. company the concession for a rock salt mine. The brine was obtained by sending fresh water over the salt layers through boreholes. The water was then evaporated in 37 pans with a total surface area of 2,211 m². This technique allowed the deposit to be considered a salty source rather than a mine, thereby avoiding the state monopoly.

=== Teste-Cubières scandal ===
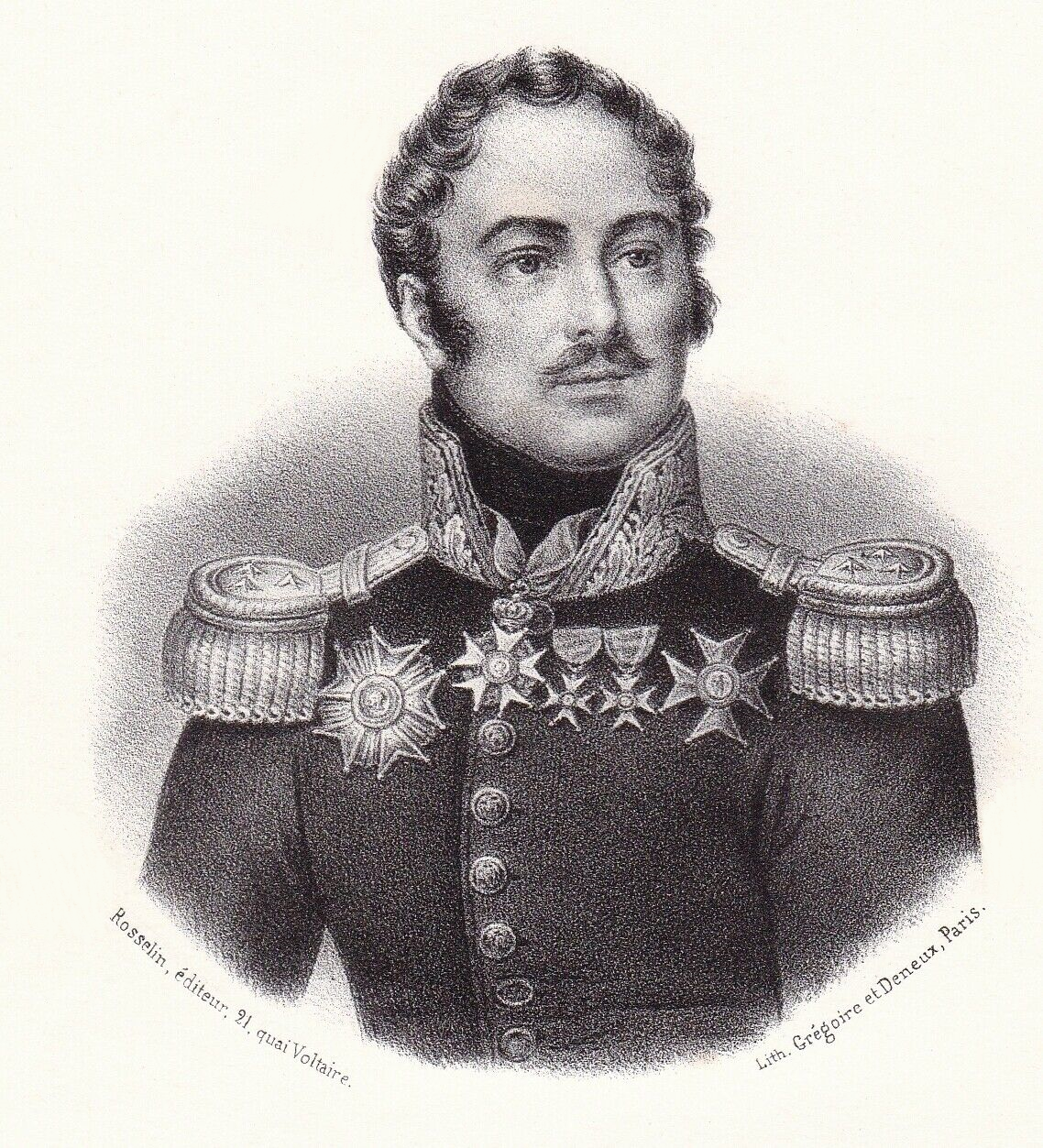
Amédée Despans-Cubières.

In July 1831, the concession company initiated its operations and established workshops for the evaporation of salt. The treatment conditions, particularly the abundance of inexpensive [uel from the coal mines, enabled the sale of the salt at prices that were lower than those of the state-run saltworks in the east. The incident provoked resentment and resulted in a scandal in 1847, involving General Despans-Cubières, who had previously served as Ministry of War and was seeking election as a deputy of Haute-Saône. He was the proprietor of 159,000 shares in the company, representing 7% of the capital. The Minister of Public Works, Jean-Baptiste Teste, was also implicated in the incident, having received a bribe of 94,000 francs in exchange for granting the concession.

The scandal was subsequently amplified and exploited by both left-wing and right-wing opposition groups to discredit the July Monarchy. In his collection, Choses vues, Victor Hugo provides a detailed account of the corruption trial that took place before the Court of Peers. Ultimately, General Despans-Cubières and the concessionaire, Mr. Parmentier, were sentenced to civic degradation and a fine of 10,000 francs. The fine imposed on Jean-Baptiste Teste amounted to 94,000 francs, and he was also sentenced to three years' imprisonment, notably being confined to the Conciergerie until the 1848 Revolution. The banquet campaign ultimately resulted in the fall of Louis-Philippe six months later. Meanwhile, the Gouhenan's saltworks continued to flourish.

=== Development ===
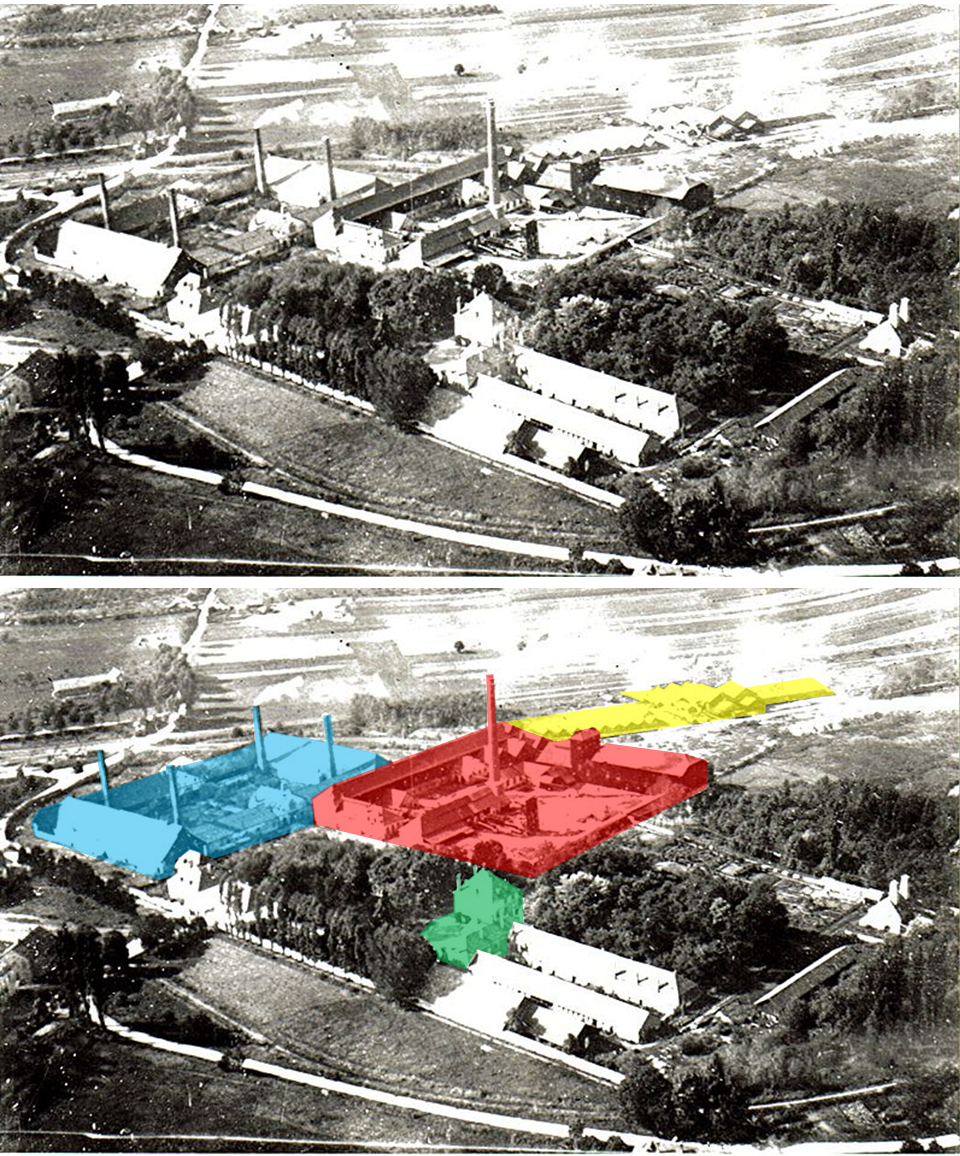
Aerial view of the site. Salt works Chemical plant Glassworks Administration

On 28 March 1843, an ordinance was enacted that authorized the activation and expansion of the saltworks, which was subsequently relocated to its final location to the east of the village. By 1866, the old site was no longer in use and had been repurposed as housing for workers. The facility's output reached 10,000 tons per year between 1845 and 1856, with operations conducted continuously, including on Sundays and holidays. In 1844, authorization was granted for the construction of a "reverberatory furnace soda factory, soda salt, tartaric acid, hydrochloric acid, sodium sulfate, tin salt, and gelatin extracted from bones by hydrochloric acid." The chemical factory in question was constructed around 1848. In approximately 1850, the complex was acquired by the Salines domaniales de l'Est due to the competitive nature of its operations. In 1864, the production of salt reached 102,000 quintals. By 1869, the pans had reached a size of sixteen by seven meters, with an output of nearly four tons of salt per day. The production of 100 kilograms of salt required the consumption of 65 kilograms of coal. The chemical factory produced sulfuric acid, hydrochloric acid, nitric acid, sodium sulfate, and calcium chloride.

In the 1890s the factory in question was responsible for the production of 40,000 quintals of hydrochloric acid, sulfuric acid, and sodium sulfate on an annual basis. The factory was subsequently owned by the Compagnie Anonyme des Salines, Houillères et Fabrique de Produits Chimiques de Gouhenans. In 1895, the construction of three 100-meter-deep boreholes enabled the production of 61,550 quintals of salt. In the subsequent year, the establishment of a railway branch with the inauguration of the Montbozon to Lure line, situated near the complex, facilitated the transportation of goods and personnel. In 1905, a glassworks was constructed to the north of the site, which had been built in 1903, and employed between thirty and forty workers. The factory's primary product was beer bottles for breweries in Alsace. However, it experienced several periods of interruption, ultimately closing permanently following the conclusion of World War I. The facility's large chimney was used for the venting of gases produced during the manufacturing of sodium sulfate and sulfuric acid. Additionally, the facility expelled the smoke from steam boilers that powered electrical generators. Upon the establishment of an electrical grid in the village of Gouhenans, the factory's generators were connected and provided supplementary power. In 1916, the upper 50-meter portion of the large chimney, which had undergone a tilting movement, was straightened by specialized workers. In 1927, the site was divided between two companies: the Société Minière et Industrielle de Gouhenans and the Ugine-Kuhlmann company, which employed a total of 70 individuals by 1931. Despite the addition of nine pans in 1926, the production of salt exhibited a gradual decline from 8,249 tons in 1912 to 7,200 tons in 1943. This decline was attributable to the increased costs of transporting coal, coupled with a lack of profitability and investment, which resulted in a loss of competitiveness against salt marshes.

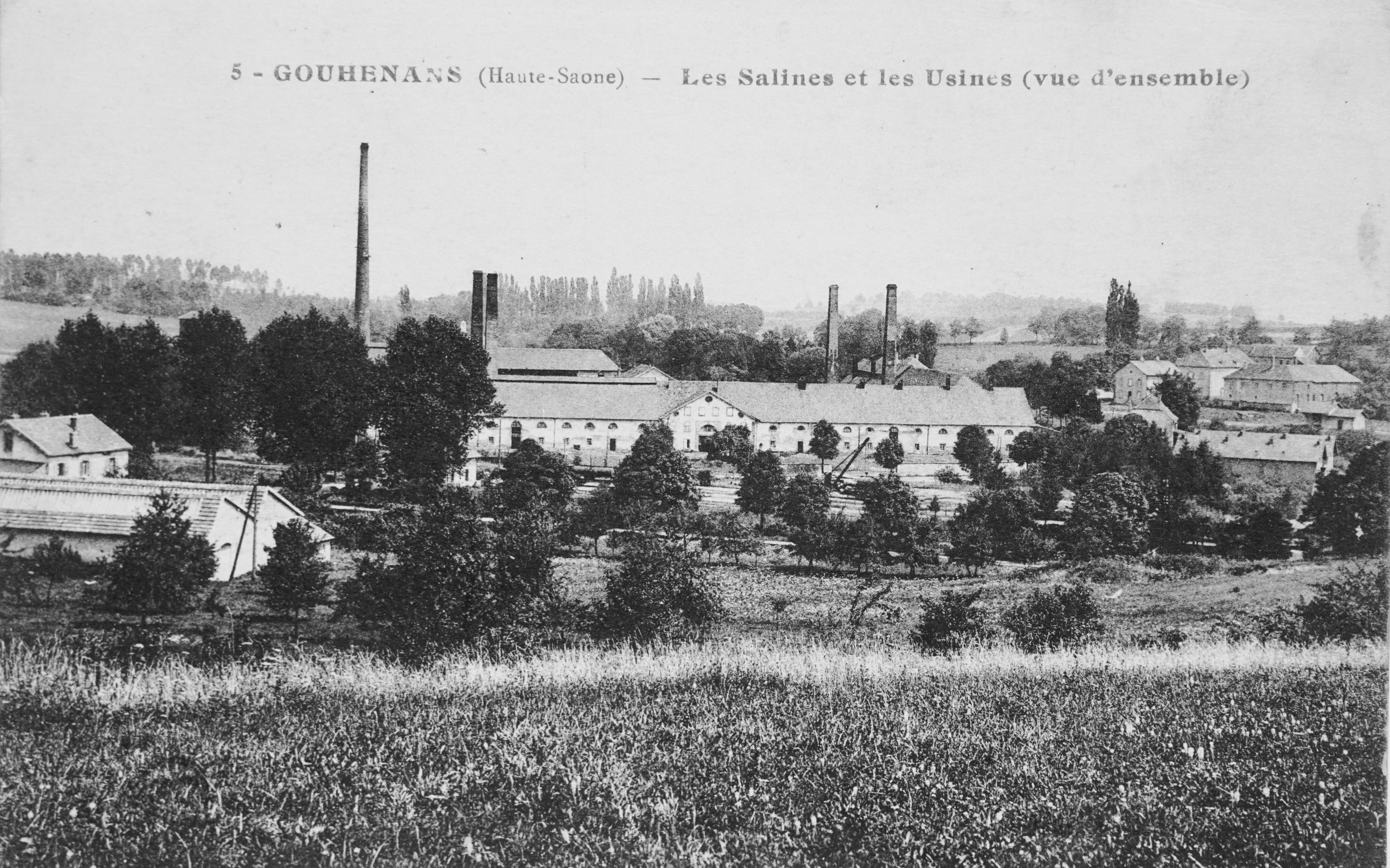
General view of the saltworks.

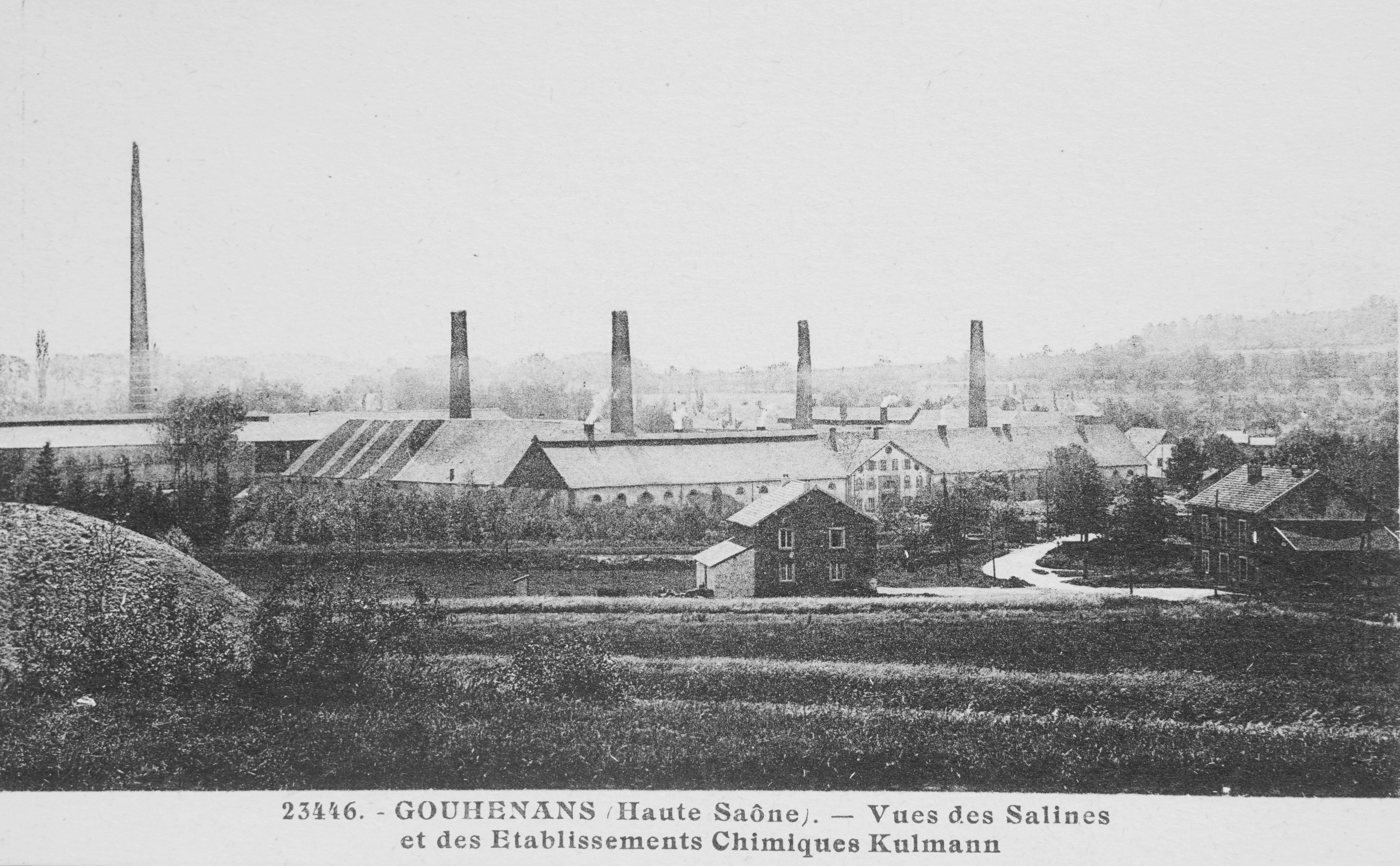

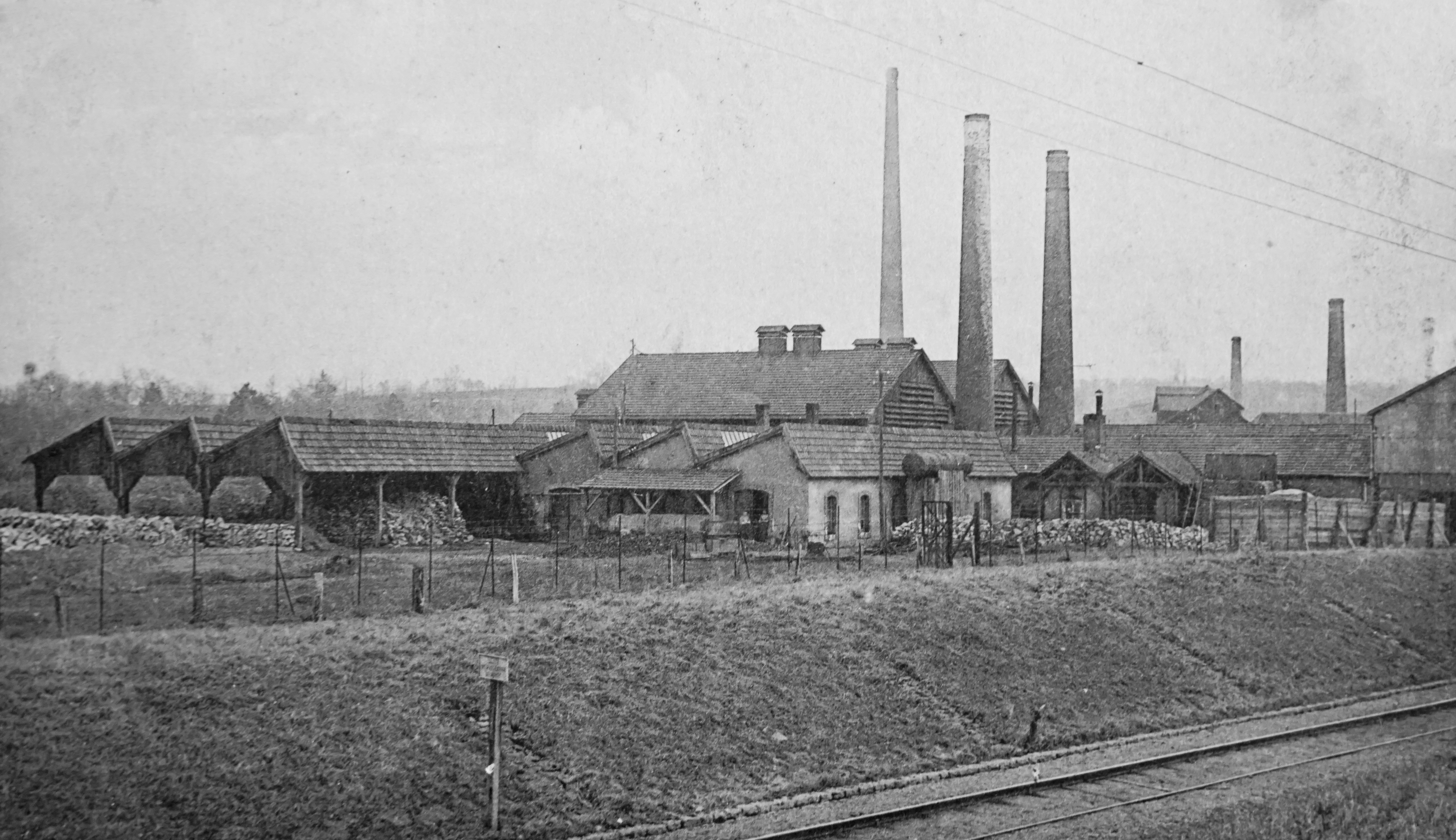
Glassworks.

=== Conversion ===
The saltworks ceased operations shortly after the conclusion of World War II, followed by the Kuhlmann factory in 1955. Some of the buildings were subsequently repurposed as warehouses for chemical products, but the majority were demolished in the 1970s. One of the two pavilions situated at the west entrance was destroyed by fire in 1992.

=== Lindane deposit ===
In 1974, 5,200 tons of lindane (a pesticide that was subsequently withdrawn from the market due to its inherent dangers) belonging to the Ugine-Kuhlmann company were illegally dumped in a location north of the site in question. Even though the responsibility for treating these wastes was assigned to the Socrimex company, they were instead covered with tarps and tires. In response, an opposition committee was established, and a petition was circulated, ultimately garnering 30,000 signatures. In an order dated 6 August 1974, the Haute-Saône prefecture requested the removal of the products by 26 February 1975, for treatment at the Loos-lès-Lille factory. However, no action was taken. After the pollution of a tributary of the Ognon, the Socrimex company was placed into liquidation, and its manager was fined 300 francs by the Lure court in June 1975. However, the manager was subsequently acquitted in April 1976.

The waste was ultimately interred in 1980 in five pits excavated to a depth of ten to fifteen meters into the marl and sealed with ash. In July 1983, the BRGM published a study indicating that lindane was leaking at a rate of 120 grams per year. However, the pollution exhibited a gradual decrease throughout the subsequent decade.

In December 1989, the BRGM observed an increase in pollution in the vicinity of the site, leading to the conclusion that the deposit was not watertight. Subsequently, the deposit was covered with an anti-punching geotextile, an HDPE geomembrane, a 10 cm layer of sand, an anti-contaminant geotextile, a 0.8 to 1-meter layer of marl, and a top layer of turf. The entire structure was encased in a concrete foundation with a depth of 50 centimeters. However, no insulation was provided for the base of the pits. These works were carried out by the Bachy company in the early 1990s. Monitoring was conducted every six months. Groundwater pollution was detected in 1998, and piezometers were installed in 2000 to improve monitoring. No external pollution was detected throughout the following decade until another increase in lindane levels was observed in June 2010, before returning to normal levels in the subsequent months and years.

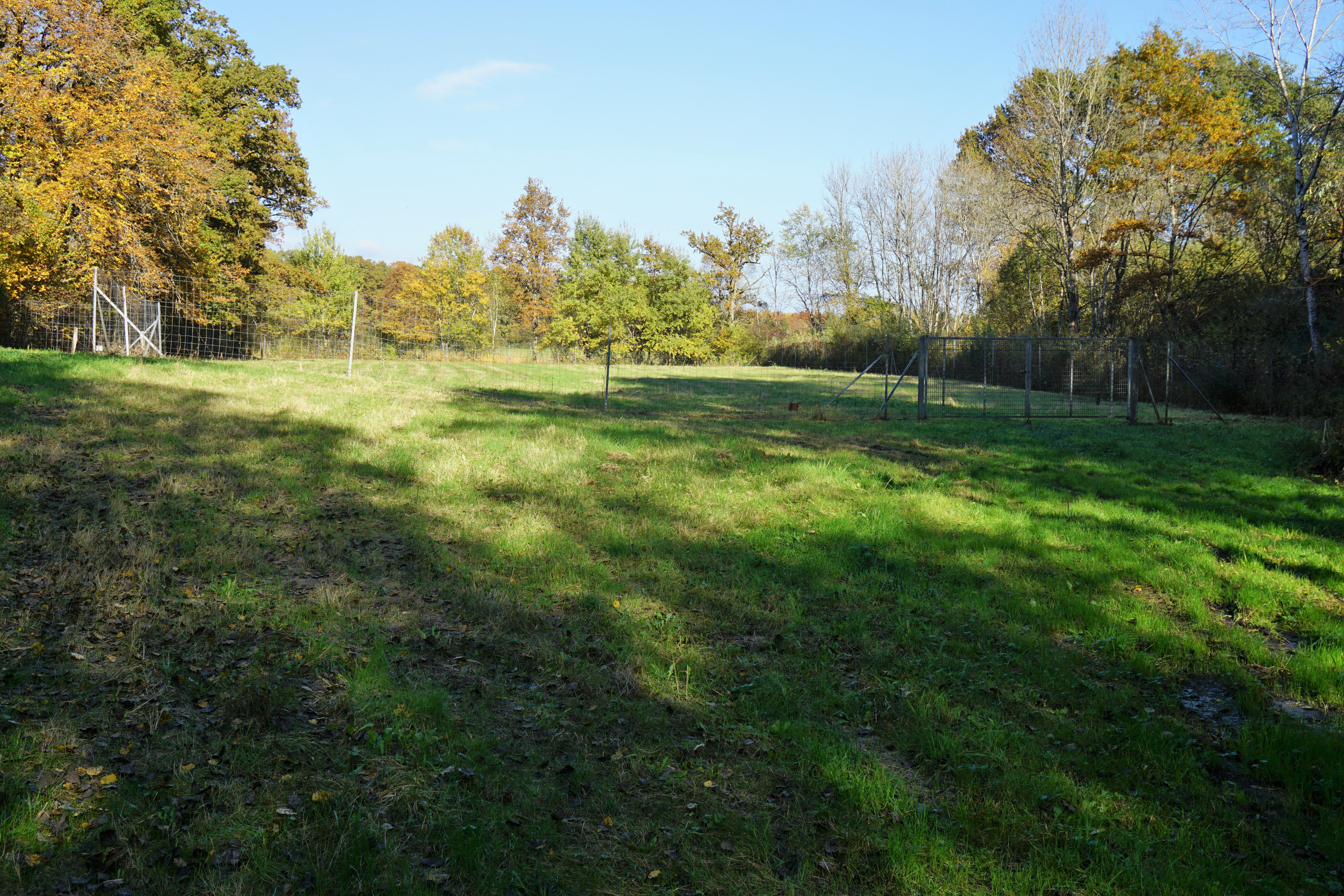
General view.

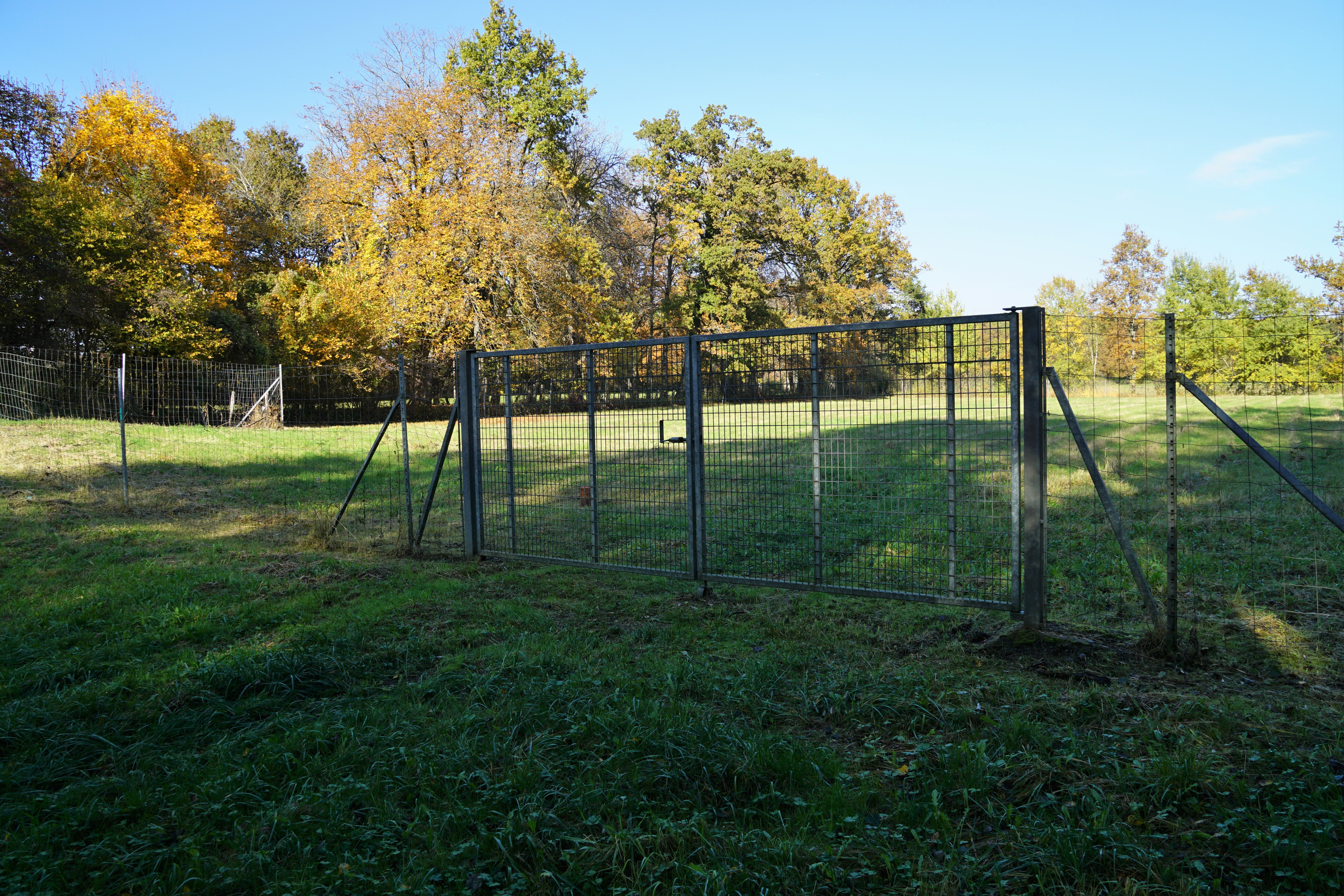
Access gate.

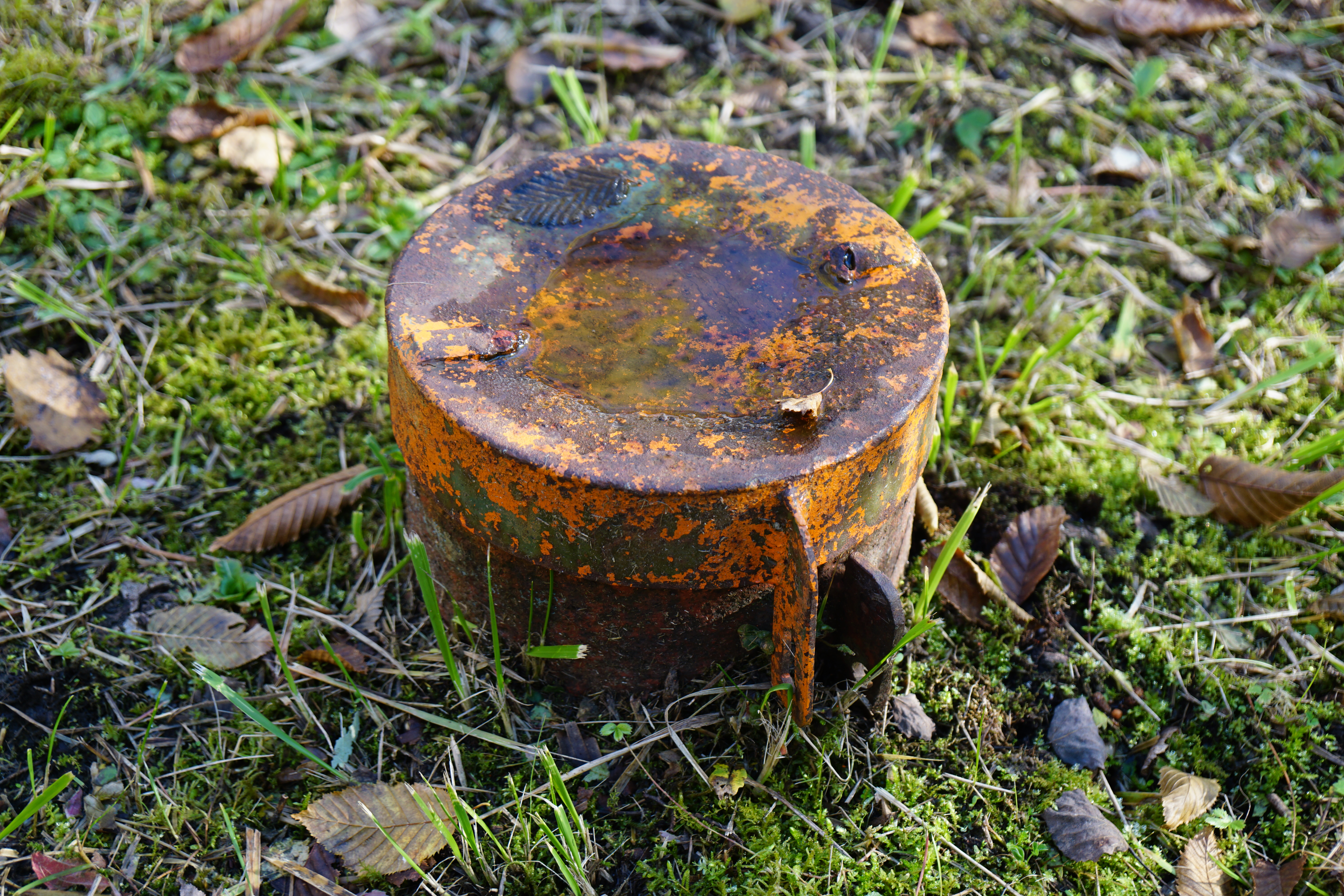
A piezometer.

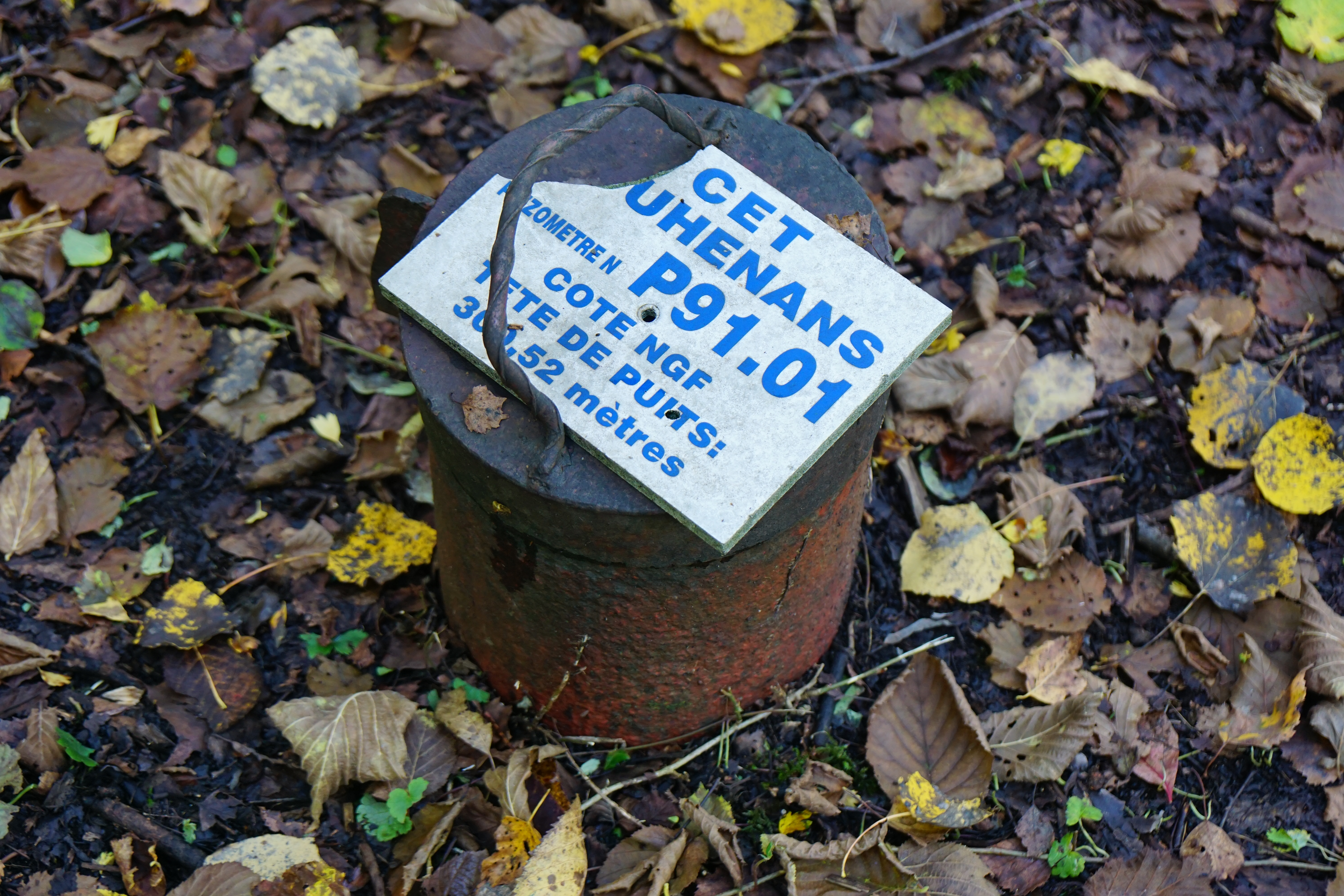
Another with nomenclature.

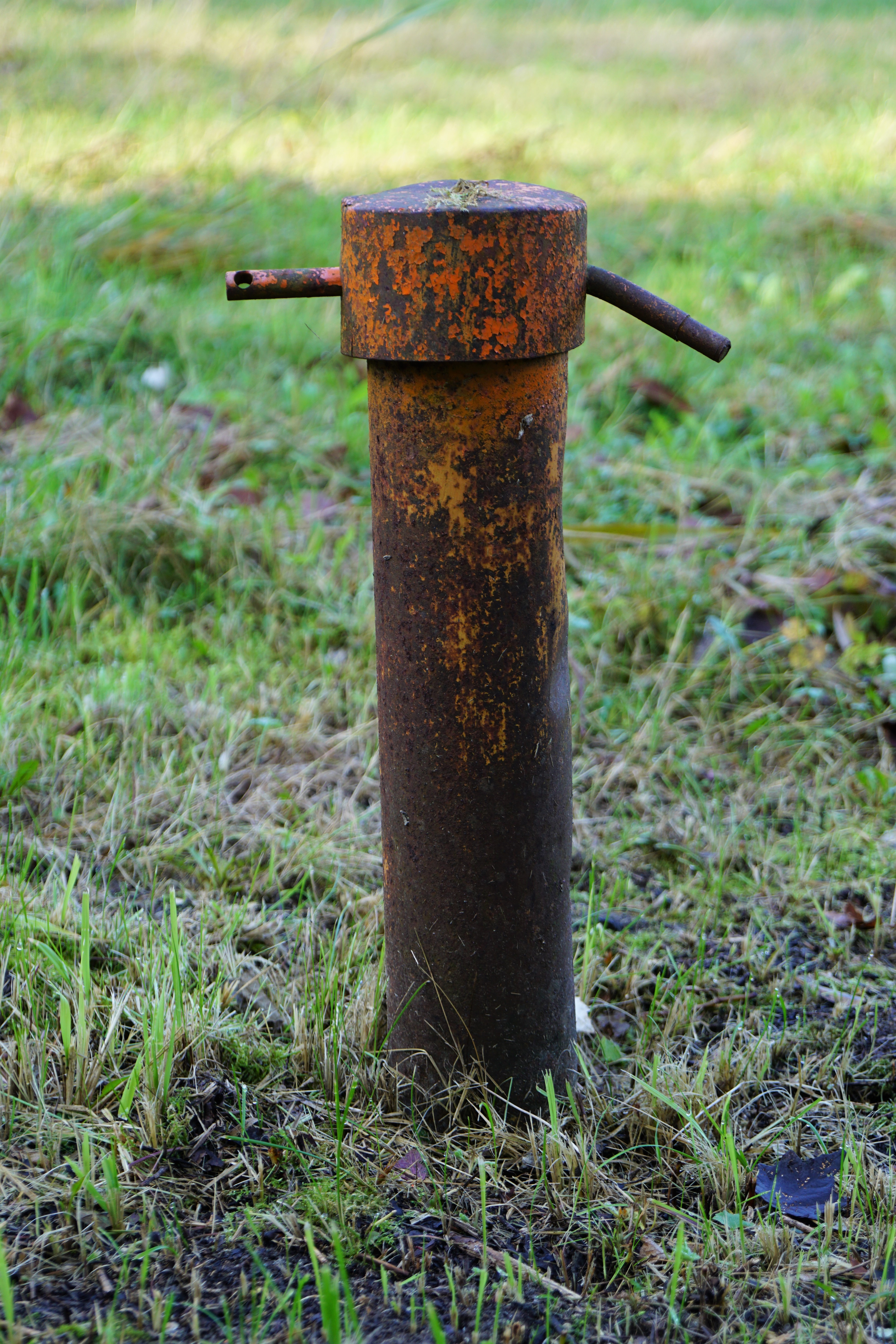
A piezometer at the Gouhenans lindane deposit.

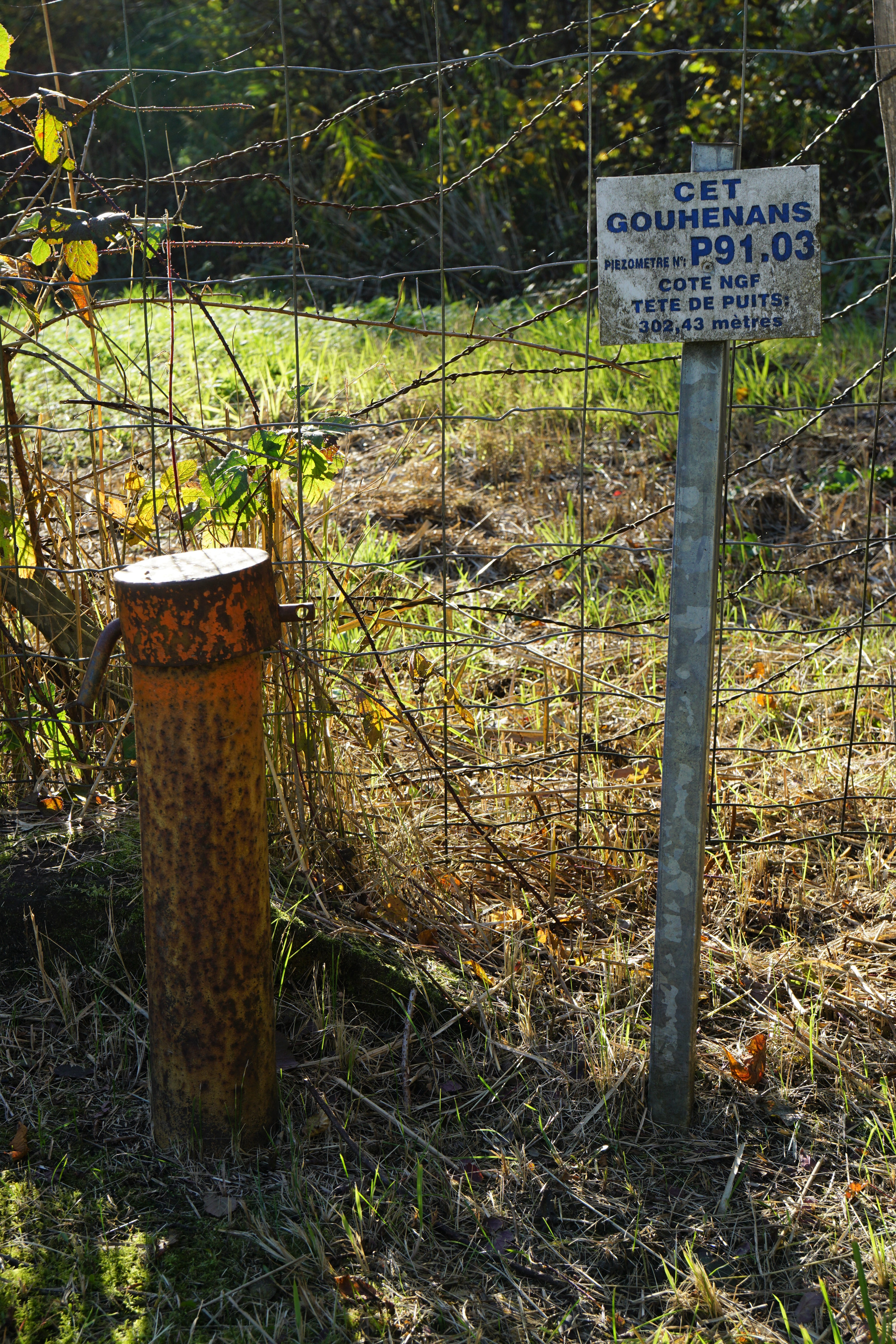
Piezometer P91.03 at the Gouhenans lindane deposit.

=== Heritage ===
At the beginning of the 21st century, the site was extensively overgrown with vegetation. Only a few remnants of the former buildings remain, some in ruins and others repurposed. The sole remaining tall square chimney stands as a testament to the site's industrial past. In 2003, the Pays de Villersexel community initiated a study of a hiking trail project to showcase the region's industrial heritage, particularly its saltworks and coal mines. The route, titled "The Way of Salt and Coal", is funded 25% by the general council of Haute-Saône and 40% by the European Union. It was inaugurated on 25 June 2009, by the sub-prefect and a hundred people. Subsequently, on 11 March 2010, the saltworks were registered in the general inventory of cultural heritage.

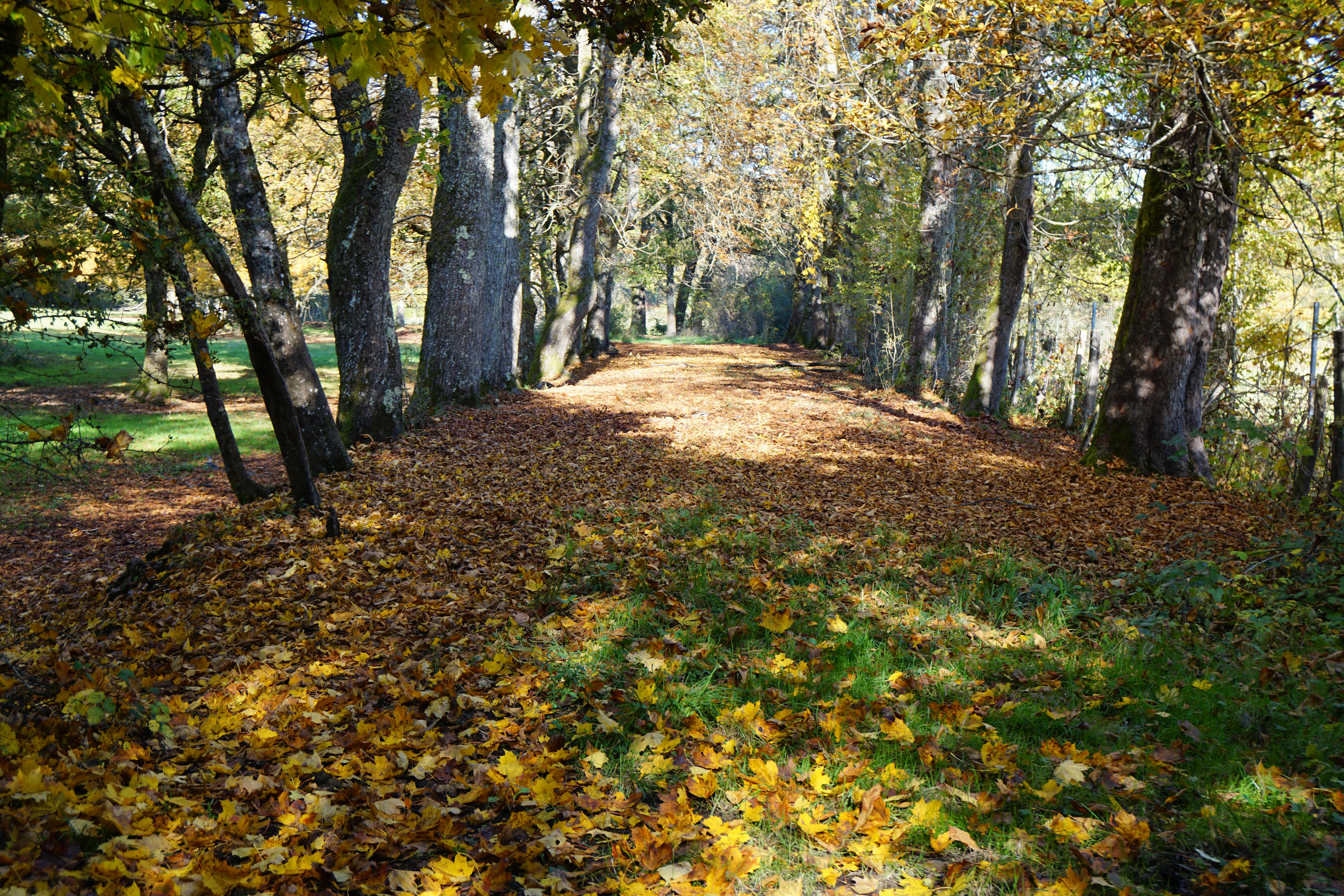
The old railway siding.

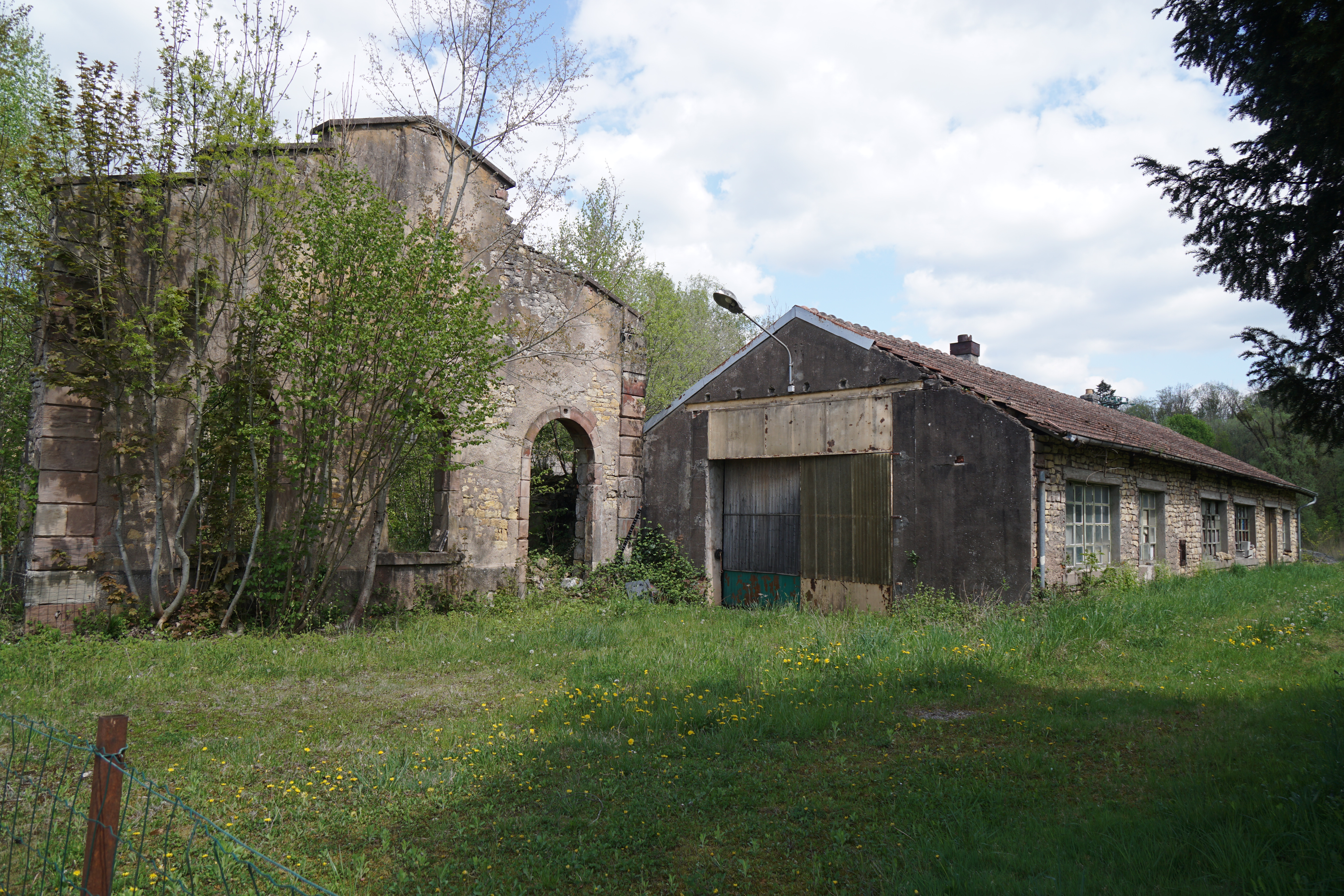
Ruins in the eastern part.

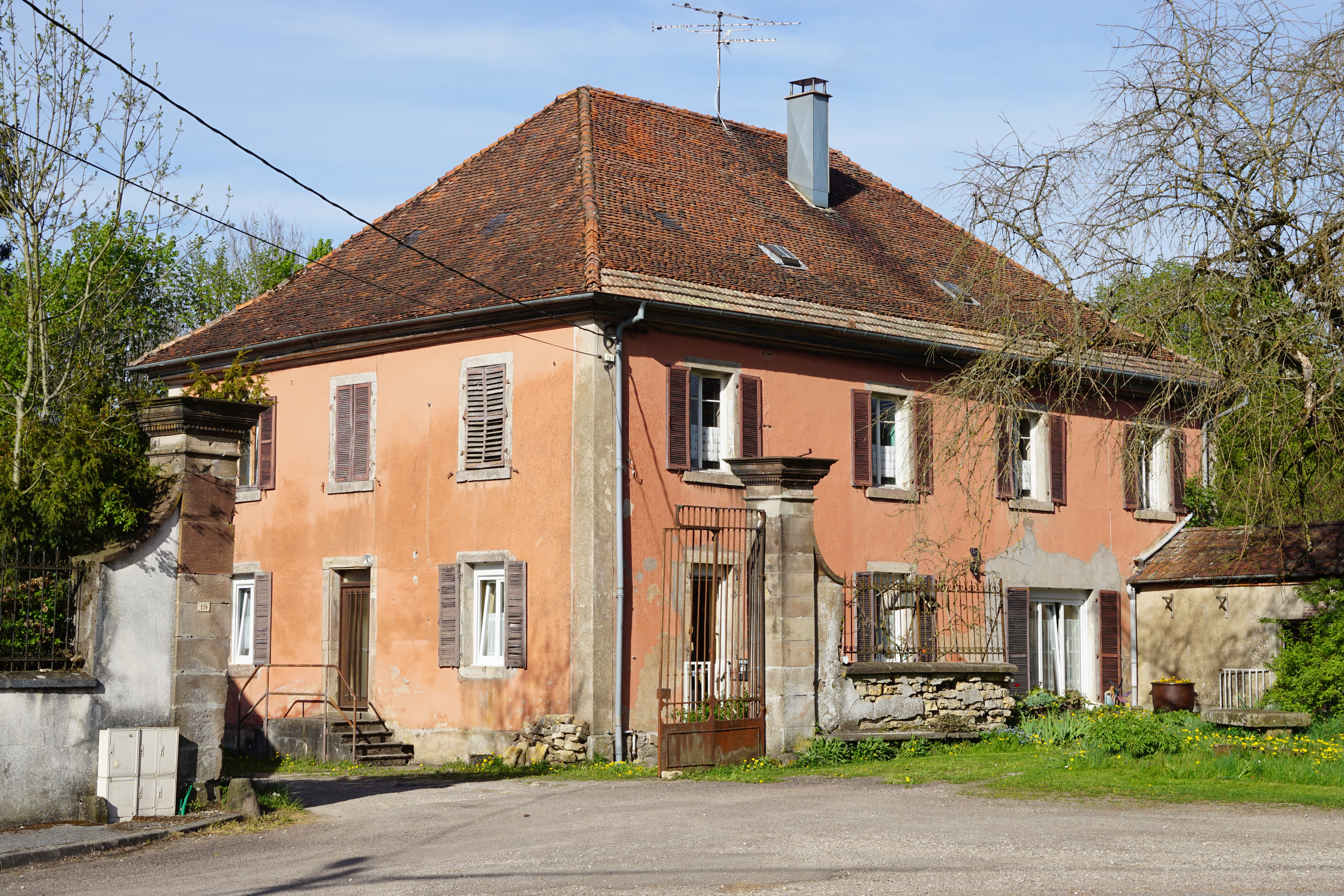
The pavilion remains intact.

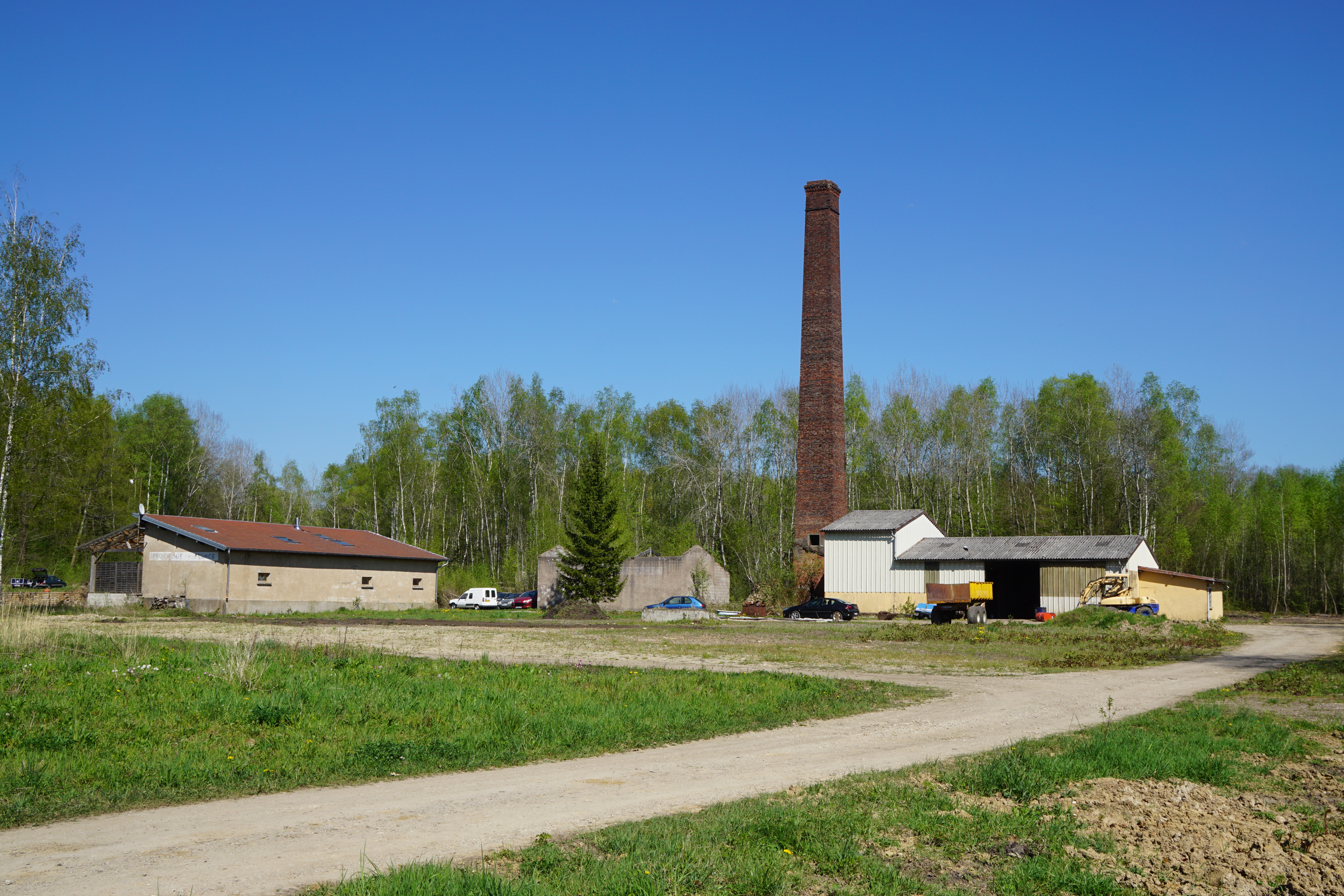
Western part of the remains.

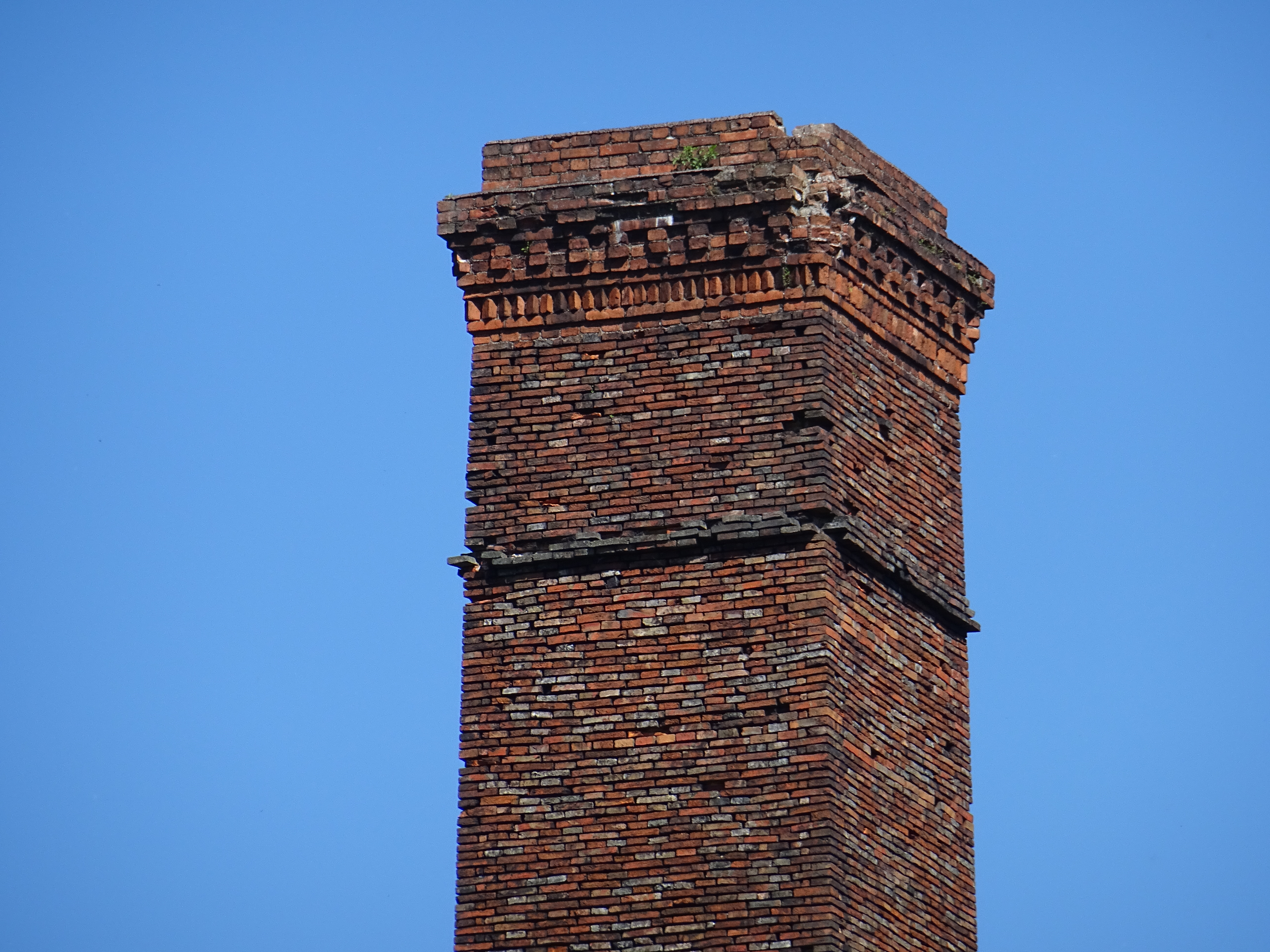
Top of the chimney.

== Coal mines ==
=== Former operations ===
The coal deposit was initially identified in the vicinity of the village of Gouhenans during the 18th century. In November 1776, the intendant of Franche-Comté and Minister Henri Bertin initiated a correspondence to authorize the exploitation of the Gouhenan's coal. However, the mining operations ultimately ceased in April 1780 due to the prevalence of water infiltration.

The exploitation of the deposit was restarted for the first time in 1819. Initially, four shafts and a gallery on the hillside, owned by Messrs. Berthod and Latmotz de Bithaine, were constructed north of Mont, not far from Val-de-Gouhenans.

=== Renewed exploitation ===
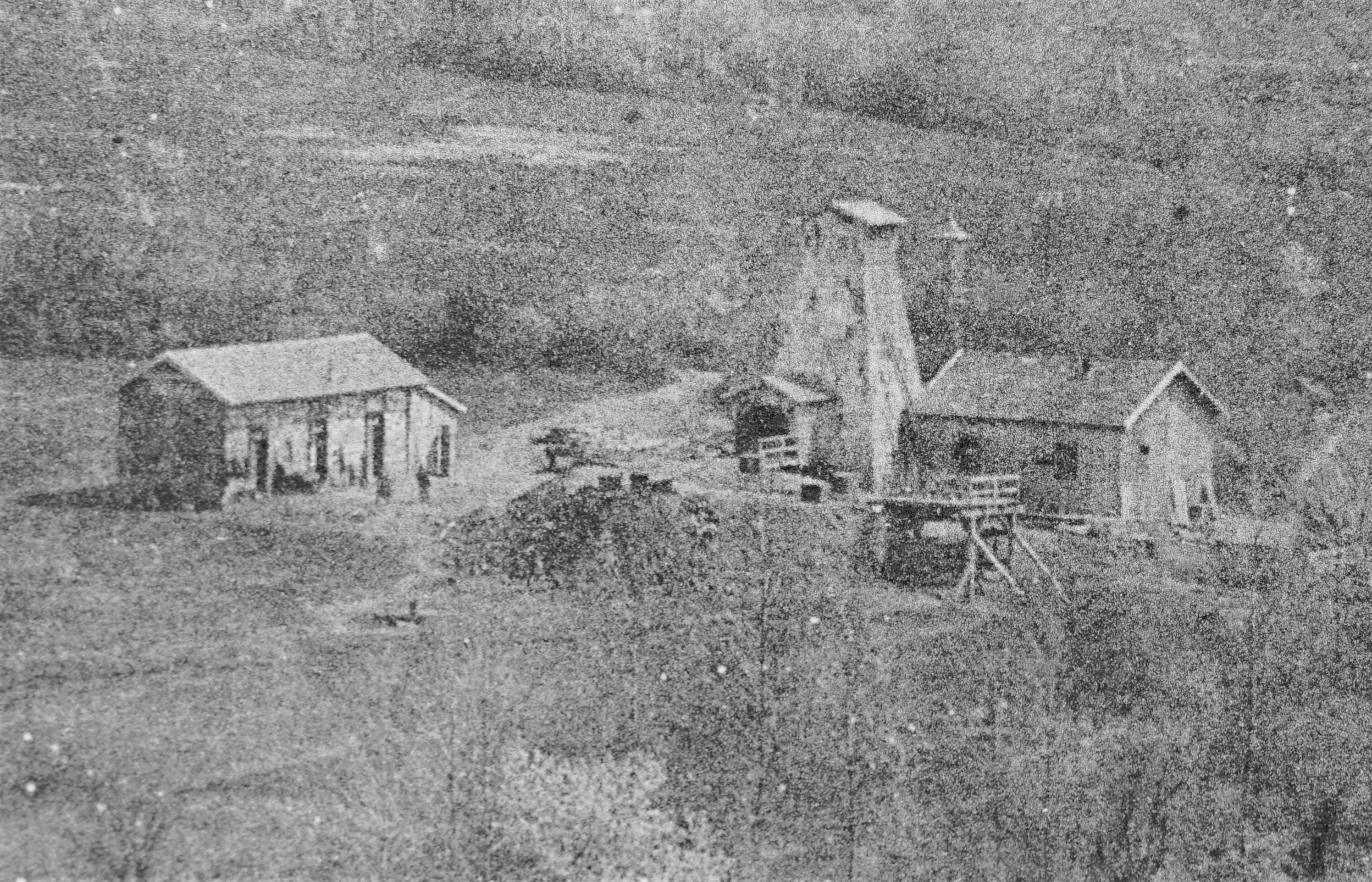
A shaft at Corcelles (Saulnot), dug and operated by the Gouhenans mines to supply the saltworks in the 1910s.

A third concession was granted on 30 July 1828, to Mr. Parmentier and his associates, who promptly relocated the existing exploitation area to a new location to the southeast, in the vicinity of the future saltworks. Only shafts No. 1 and No. 2 have been operational since 1827. Shaft No. 1 served as the primary extraction shaft from 1826 to 1836. In 1833, the average monthly production was 4,693 quintals, which was entirely consumed by the saltworks.

The operation was terminated in 1835 as a consequence of the prohibition on salt production. The workforce was reduced to 17 individuals, comprising those assigned to maintenance and water pumping. This was a reduction from the usual complement of 85. Subsequently, extraction was conducted in shafts No. 4 and No. 5. Shaft No. 4 served as the primary extraction shaft from 1839 to 1869. In 1864, the production amounted to 9,983.8 tons of coal, sold at 0.90 francs per quintal. The Gouhenans concession was operated by shafts No. 4 and No. 10, the latter being the main extraction shaft from 1864 to 1874. The following year, the workforce numbered 80 people.

On 14 March 1879, a presidential decree unified the four concessions of Vy-lès-Lure, Gouhenans, Athesans, and Saulnot for coal exploitation. At the time of the decree, the Vy-lès-Lure concession was operational; however, it ceased activities in 1905. In contrast, the Saulnot concession was active from 1911 to 1921.

Shaft No. 11 was the most productive from 1873 to 1893, after which shaft No. 15 assumed that role until 1899. The cessation of coal mining was first documented in 1900, following the premature closure of shaft No. 15 due to flooding. The resumption of mining activity occurred in 1906, following the abandonment of the Vy-lès-Lure concession, initially through a descender and subsequently through shafts No. 13 and 17. The final cessation of coal mining occurred in 1921.

In 1923, the representative of the Société minière et industrielle de Gouhenans, Mr. Gaillard, formally requested the surrender of a mining title. This request was subsequently approved by decree on 17 February 1925.

The outlines of the six concessions in the Saône region granted to exploit the Keuperian basin.

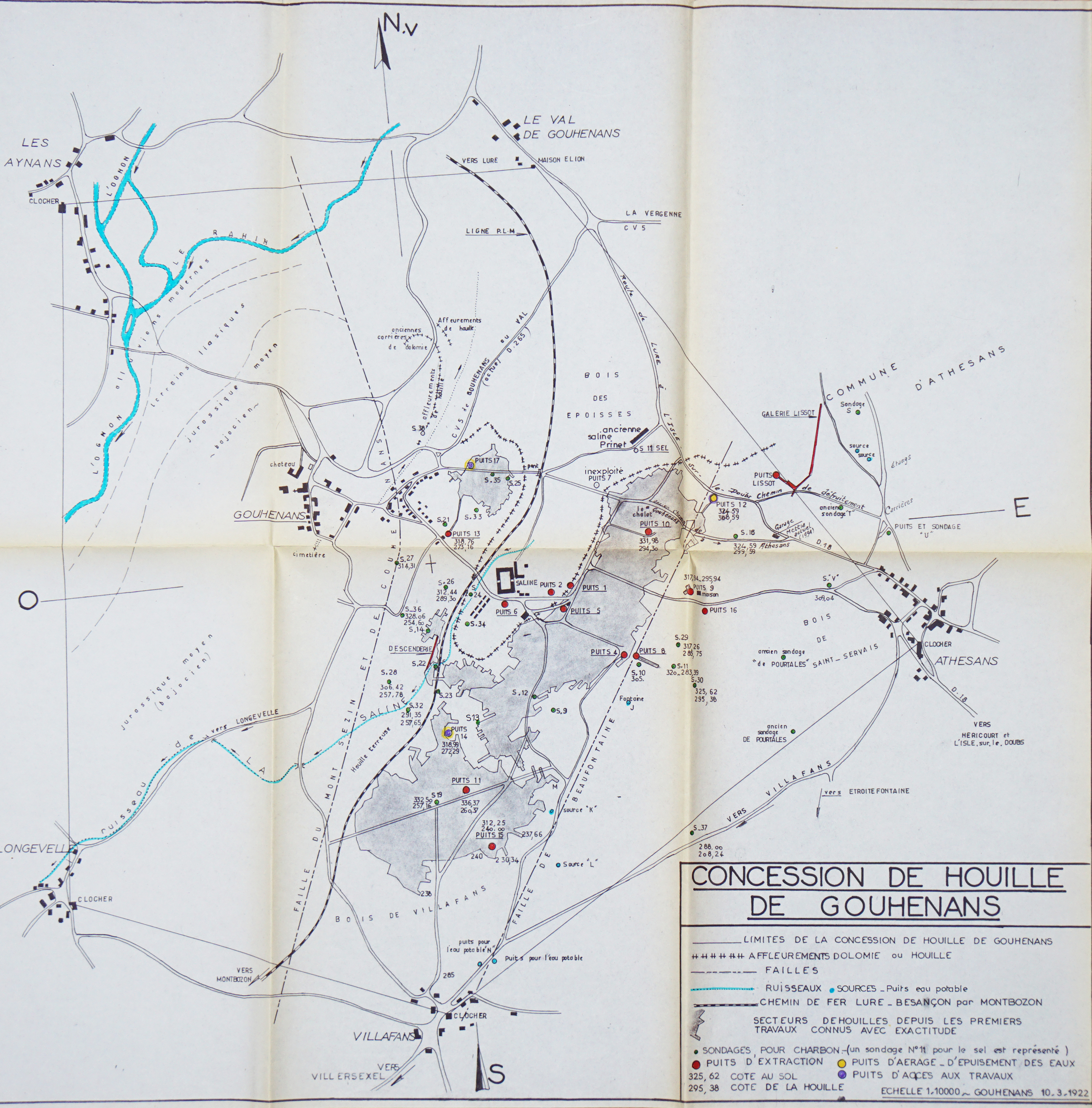
Detail of the Gouhenans concession with the various wells and areas exploited.

=== Shaft No. 1 ===
47°36′03″N 6°29′04″E

Shaft No. 1 was constructed in 1826 and reached a depth of 11 meters below the surface, where coal deposits were encountered. Subsequently, the shaft was extended to a depth of 12 meters. This shaft was situated to the east of the future saltworks, at a location designated as Chintres-du-Chanois. The shaft was timbered with a rectangular section measuring 2.65 meters by 1.32 meters. It was abandoned in January 1833 due to excessive water infiltration. It was subsequently restarted in July after the dewatering of the works. In November 1834, the shaft was divided into three compartments (two for extraction, one for personnel) by two wooden partitions.

The extraction process was conducted using a horse engine, which was powered by a horse and operated a 5-meter-long arm that drove two 2-meter-diameter drums. The water bucket had a capacity of 312 liters, while the coal cart could hold 2.5 quintals. The horse engine enabled the lifting of 16 carts per hour or 4 tons. Shaft No. 1 was permanently abandoned in 1839, and Shaft No. 4 was subsequently restarted to succeed it.

Examination of the area surrounding the shaft at the beginning of the 21st century revealed the presence of several spoil heaps and mounds.

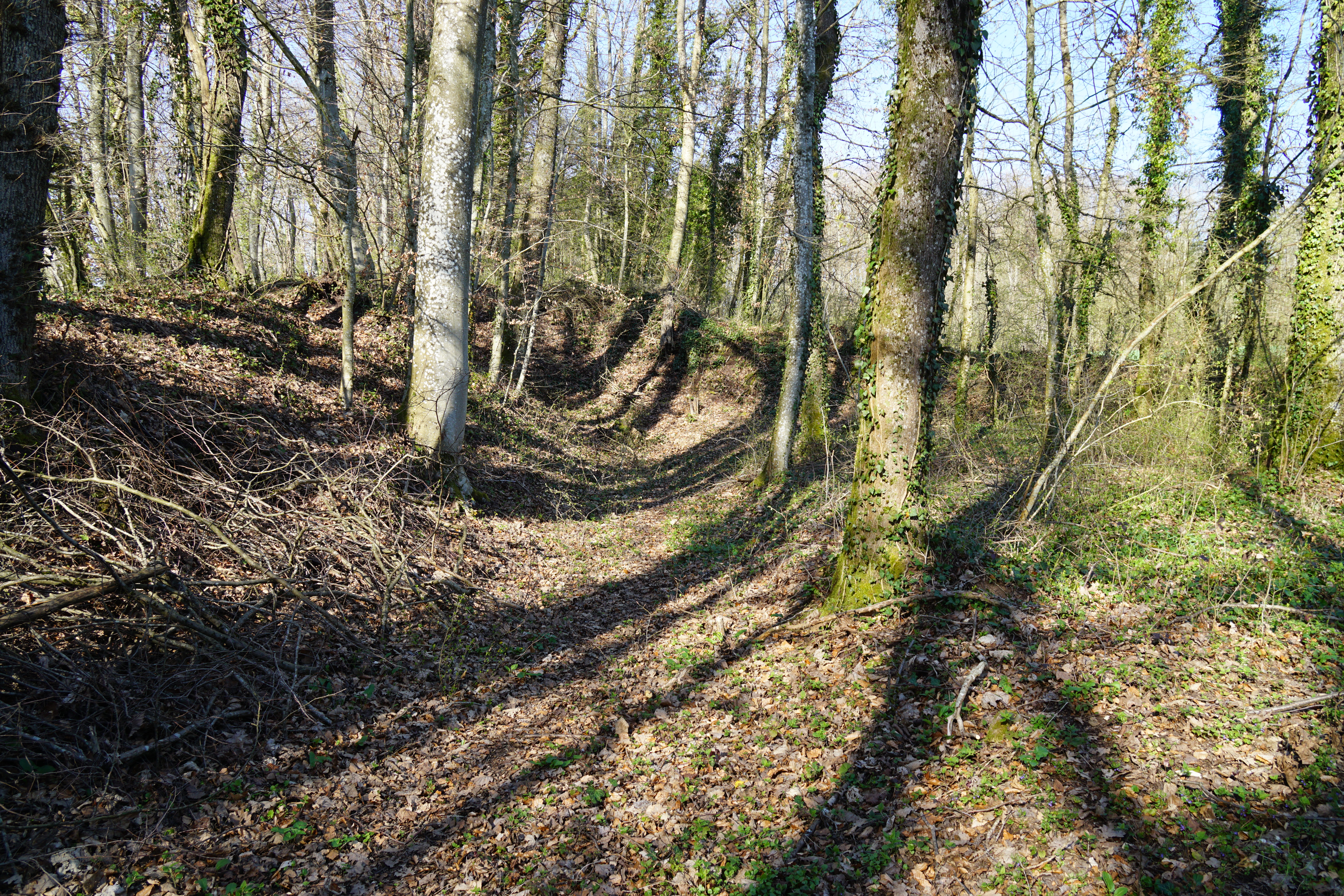
The slag heap at shaft no. 1.

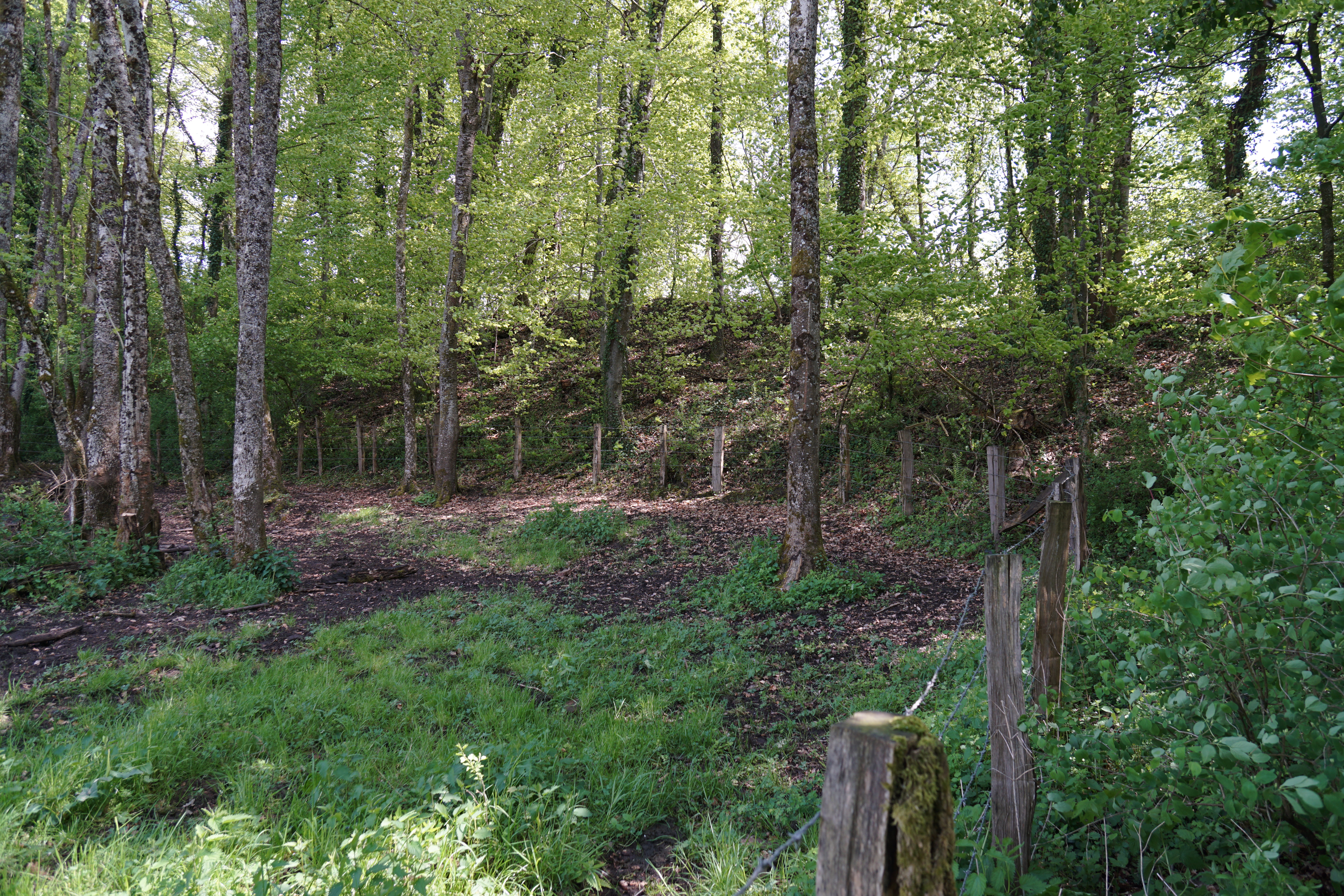

=== Shafts No. 2 and No. 3 ===
47°36′01″N 6°28′57″E; 47°36′19″N 6°29′18″E

Shafts No. 2 and No. 3 were constructed close to shaft No. 1; but they were subsequently decommissioned.

Shaft No. 2, which reached a depth of 11 meters, remained operational for an extended period, despite the growth of an overgrown spoil heap. In 1982, a cow from a nearby pasture fell into the shaft. The landowner subsequently backfilled the shaft in the early 1980s.

=== Shafts No. 4 and No. 8 ===
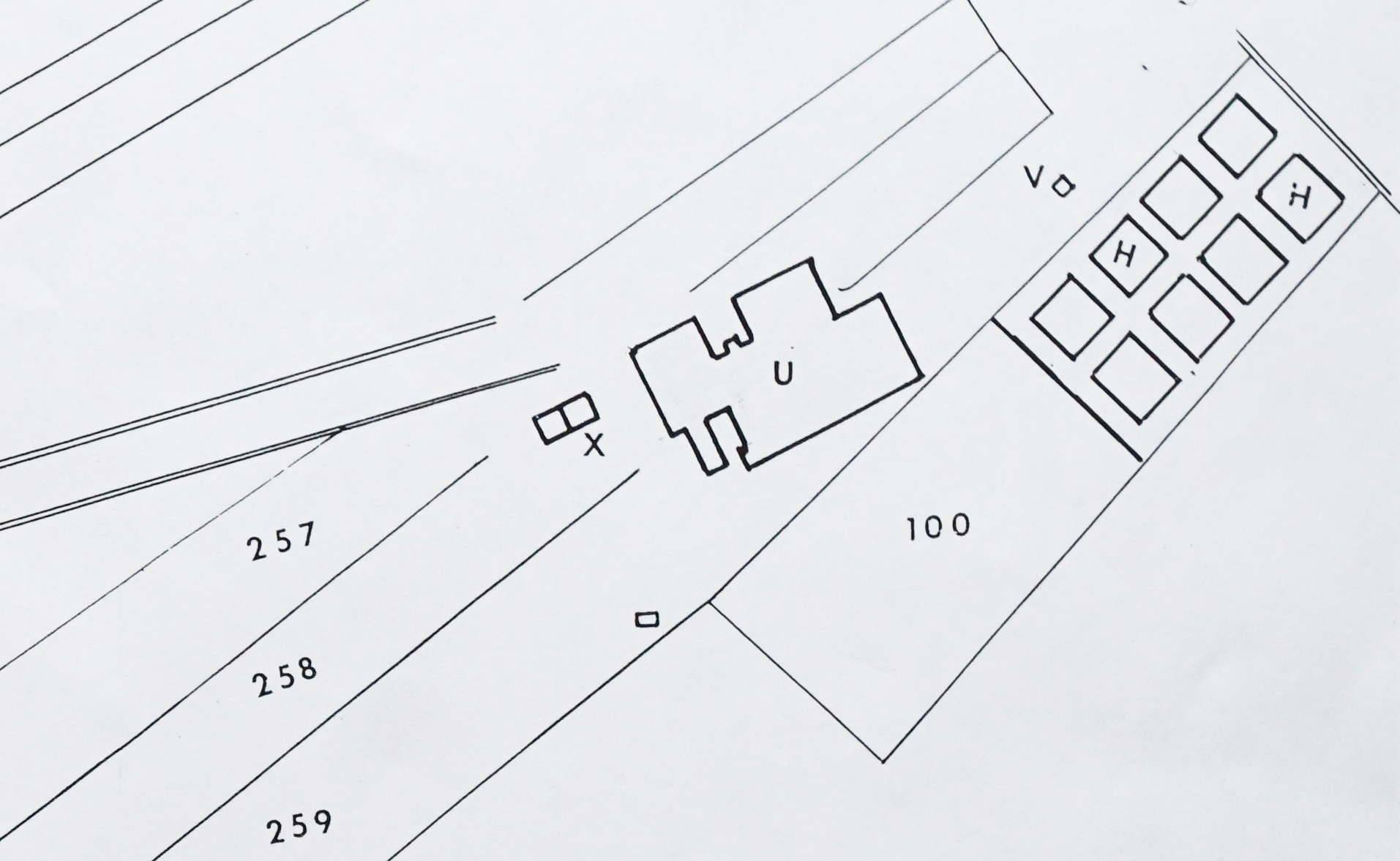
Ground plan of No. 4 and No. 8 shafts: U. No. 4 shaft, extraction machine, boilers, coal wash house and gypsum mill; X. gypsum kilns and stables; V. shaft No. 8; H. settling basins.

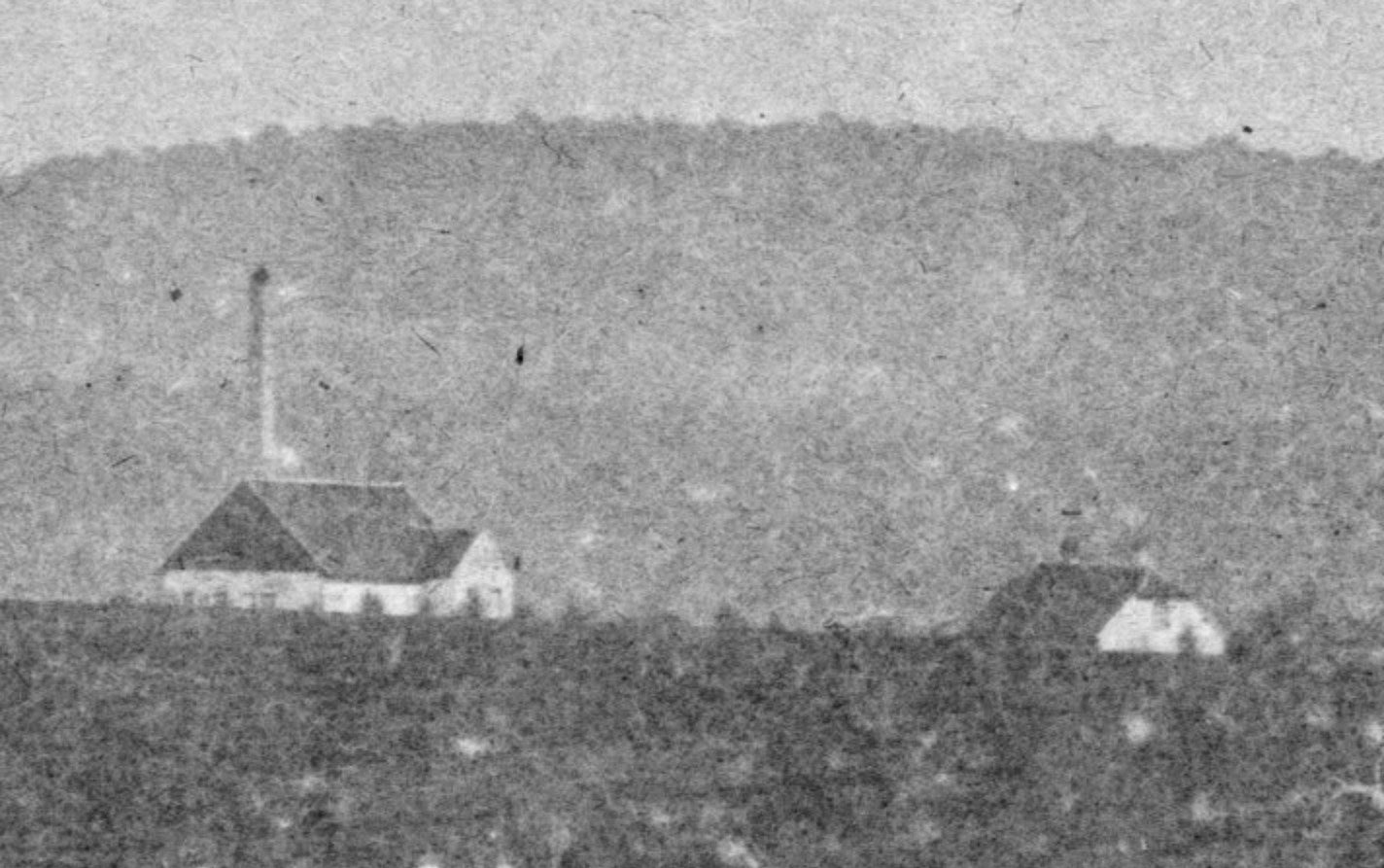
Distant view of shaft No. 4.

47°35′50″N 6°29′14″E; 47°35′48″N 6°29′15″E

Shaft No. 4 was constructed in 1828. The initial equipment installed at the site was a four-horsepower boiler. The shaft was constructed with a rectangular timber section measuring 2.66 meters by 1.33 meters. The depth reached was 33.33 meters, with a coal seam measuring 0.80 meters in thickness being encountered. The shaft was constructed in a location designated as Aux-Planchottes, situated on the border of the commune of Athesans. In January 1832, the project was temporarily halted due to the excessive infiltration of water. Restoration work commenced in January 1837. A 12-horsepower steam engine was installed in a building constructed in May 1837 to facilitate the extraction and pumping of minerals from the shaft. The two boilers were supplied with water from an underground stream located beneath the engine building. The loading chamber was constructed at a distance of five meters from the unstable bottom of the shaft, with an elliptical brick gallery serving as the connection. The works were connected to shaft No. 6. A duct was constructed to provide ventilation, passing through the boiler hearth and chimney. In 1839, the shaft was restarted to replace shaft No. 1. Before marketing the coal, it was washed to remove the iron sulfide it contained. In May, it was the only active shaft and suffered a water influx of 2,200 hectoliters per day.

In 1847, the shaft yard comprised eight settling basins, a modest stable, and a gypsum kiln. Shaft No. 8, designated "Shafts de-la-Chèvre" due to its smaller size and basic construction featuring a manual winch, served as an exploratory shaft. It was constructed near the basins and buildings associated with Shaft No. 4. Located 60 meters southeast of Shaft No. 4, Shaft No. 8 reached a depth of 19 meters. It was extended through further exploratory works but ultimately abandoned in 1848 due to the inconclusive nature of the results obtained. Meanwhile, Shaft No. 4 yielded 81,241 quintals over the year, with 300 of these sold to local farriers.

In 1850, the only operational shaft was No. 4. The extracted coal was subjected to washing to separate it from the accompanying gypsum and pyrite. The material was initially screened to separate the larger pieces and then sorted by hand. The remaining fines were washed in a shaker screen and a vibrating table. The waste material was then subjected to a crushing and washing process in a small shaker screen, and the fines were passed through a mesh filter. The material was then subjected to a second washing process, this time between two cast iron pulleys, to extract the pyrite, which was subsequently used in the chemical factory for the production of sulfuric acid. A total of nine individuals were engaged in the coal-washing process, while a further seven were employed in pyrite washing. In 1853, the works were organized around a gallery measuring 417 meters in length, which served the shaft. At the surface, the colliery was equipped with an extraction machine, two extraction pumps, two backup pumps, an ore crusher, two large coal screens, and coal and pyrite washers. Its depth was 80 meters. On June 26, 1854, a 19-year-old rouleur died of a cerebral hemorrhage following the fall of a shale block.

In 1859, a new 15-horsepower steam engine was installed for extraction and drainage. In the same year, shaft No. 8 was operational with its small tripod headframe, extracting low-quality coal and mainly pyrite. A catastrophic incident in this shaft resulted in the deaths of four miners, the youngest of whom was only 13 years old. This shaft was subsequently decommissioned. The final extraction works ceased at the end of 1864, but the shaft was kept open for the drainage of shaft No. 10, which succeeded it.

At the beginning of the 21st century, the spoil heap, the site of shaft No. 4, and the remains of building ruins are still visible at the forest edge.

Remains

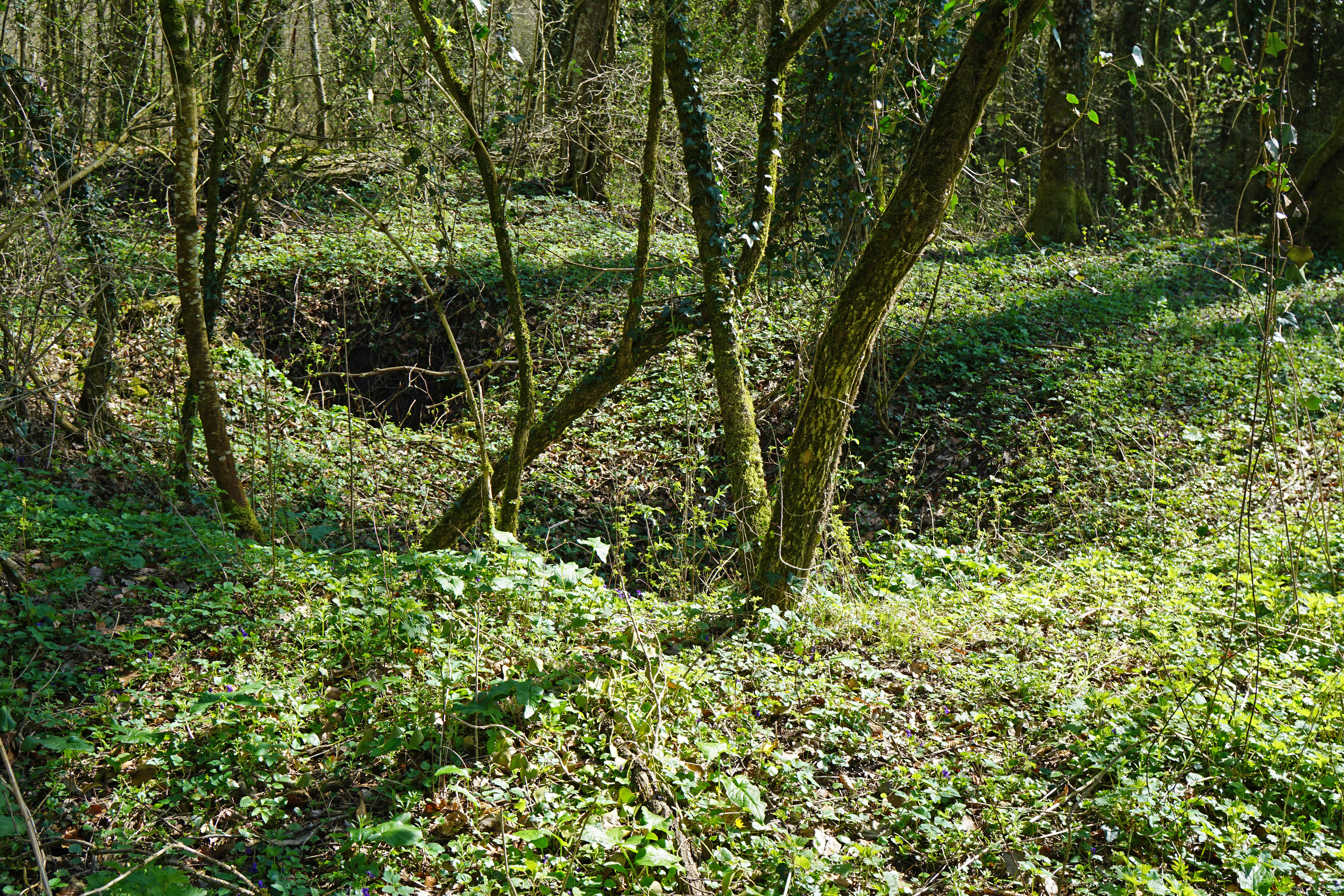
Location of shaft No. 4.

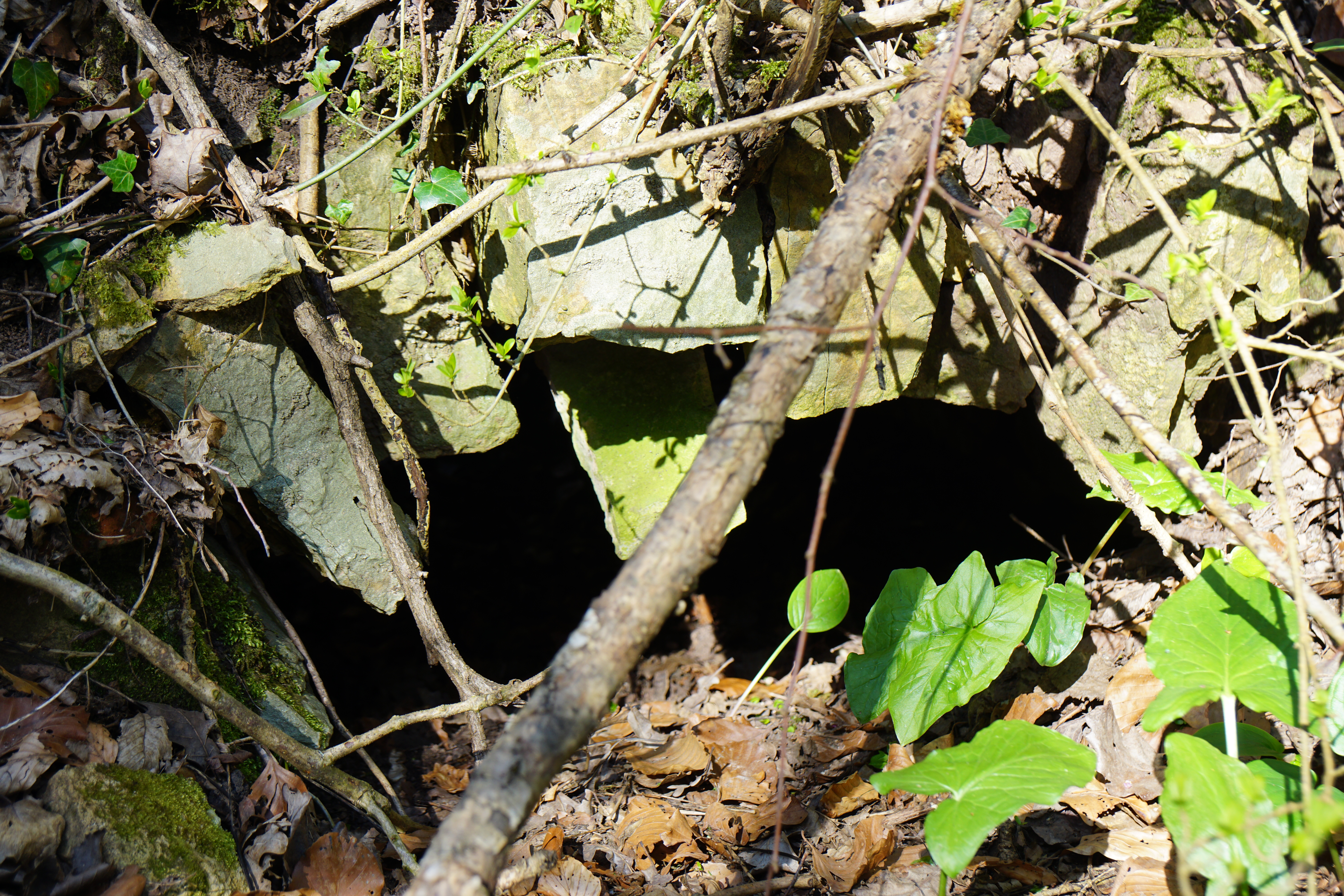
Detail of a ruined building.

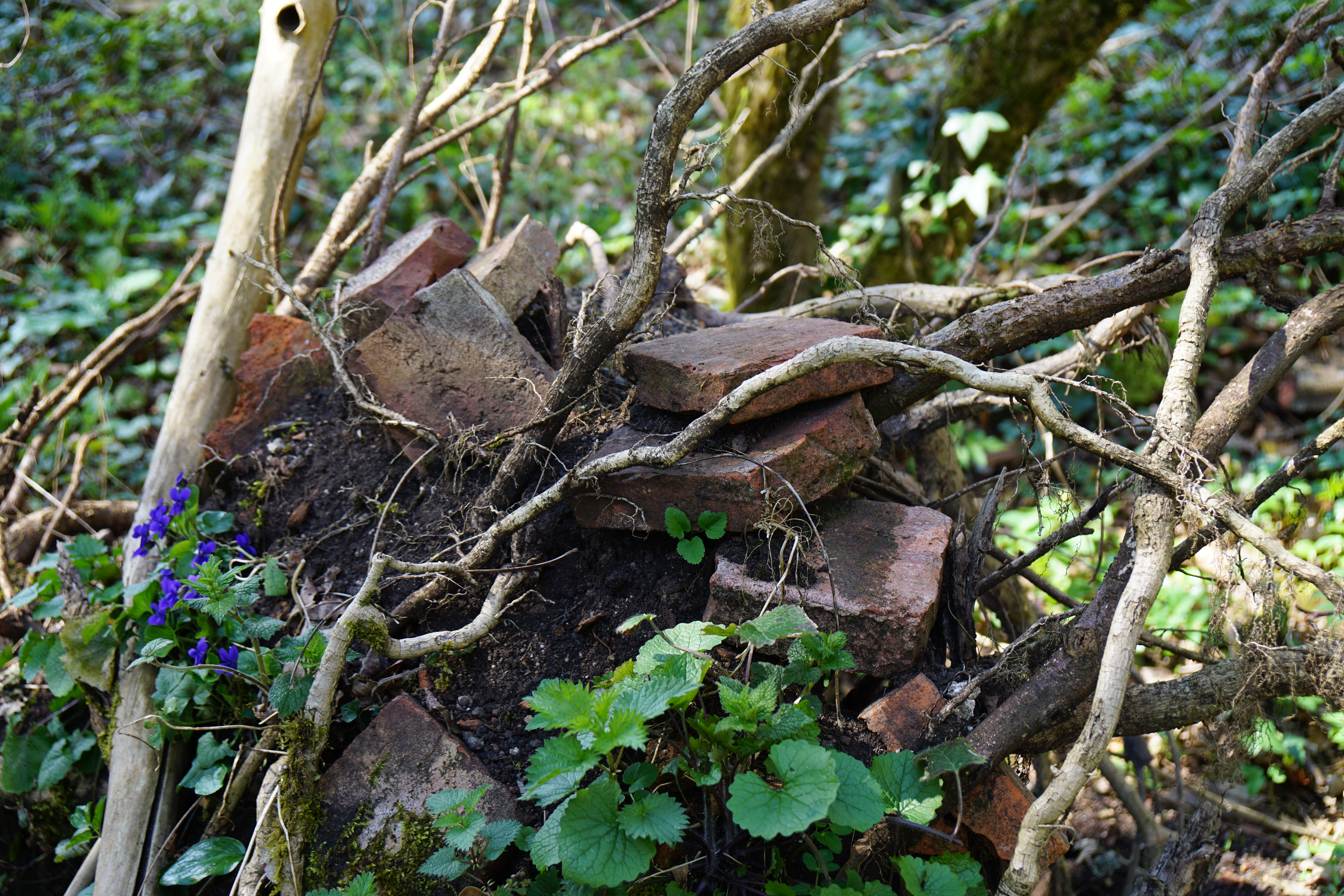
Uprooted bricks.

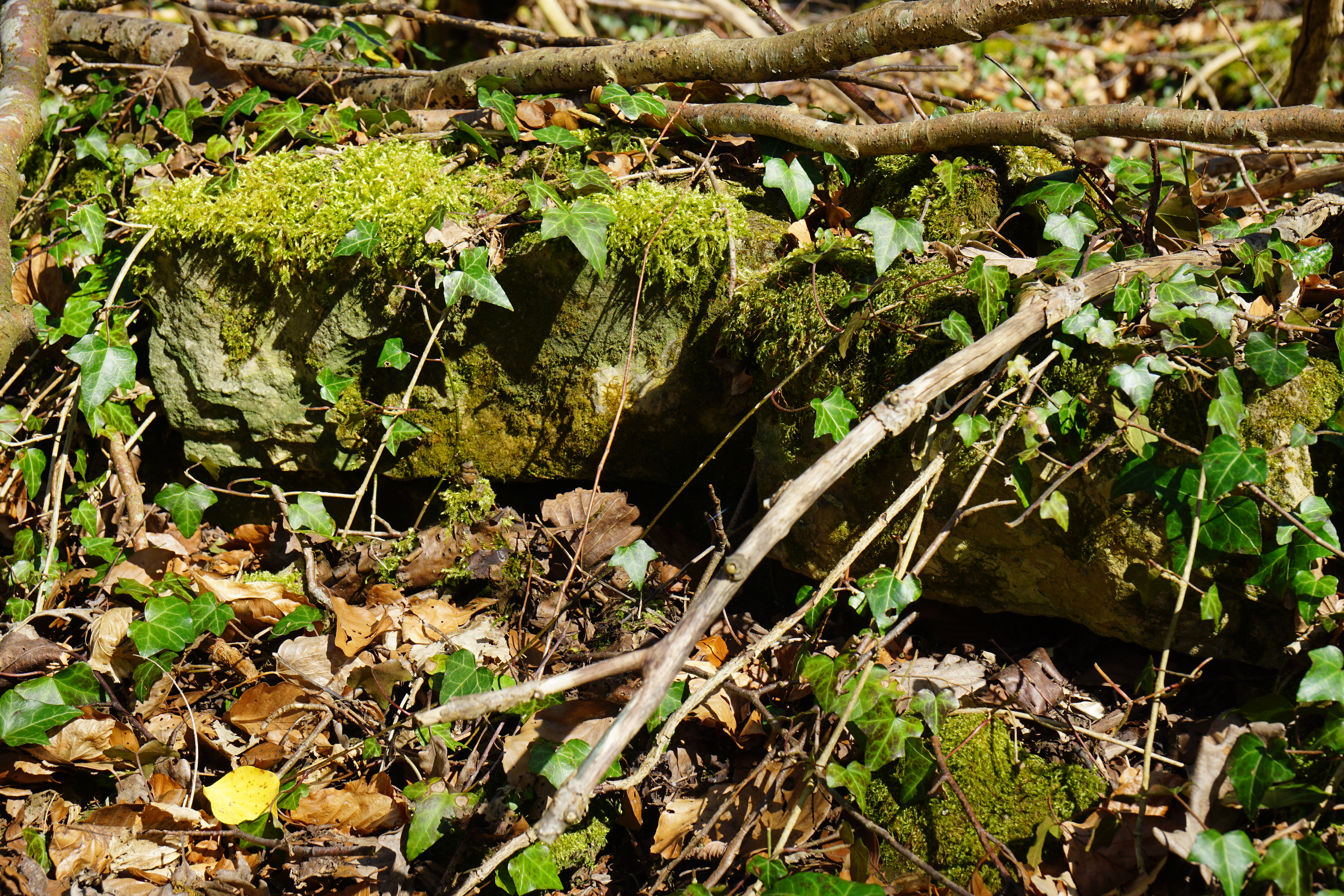
Wall base.

The spoil heap is the most imposing of all the operations in the Keuper basin. The longest-lived shaft, across all companies, is No. 4, with a lifespan of 30 years. The heap measures 20 to 60 meters wide, 265 meters long, and peaks at approximately 10 meters high, situated just opposite the shaft. (Note: Measurements made with Google Earth.)

Spoil heaps

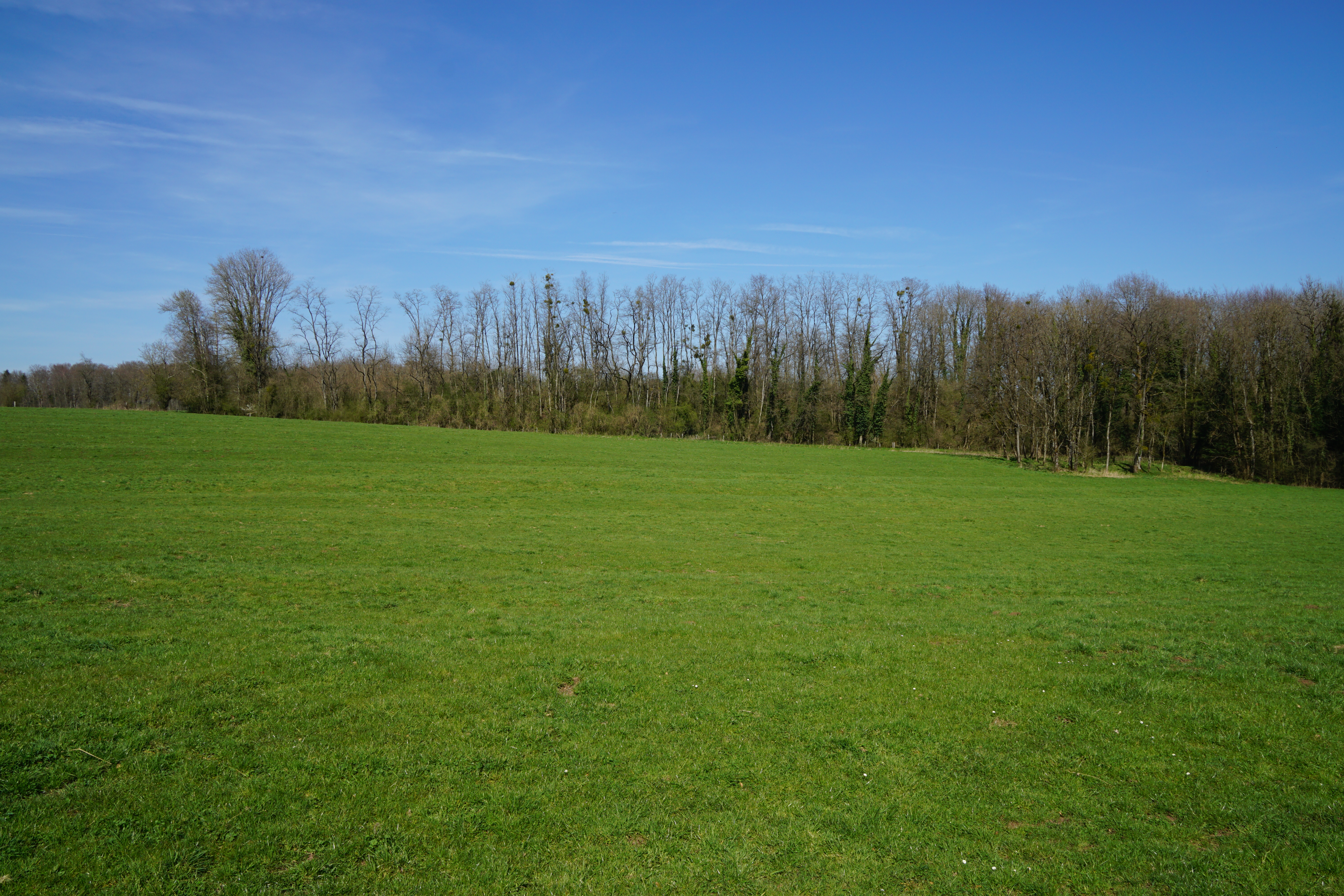
Scope.

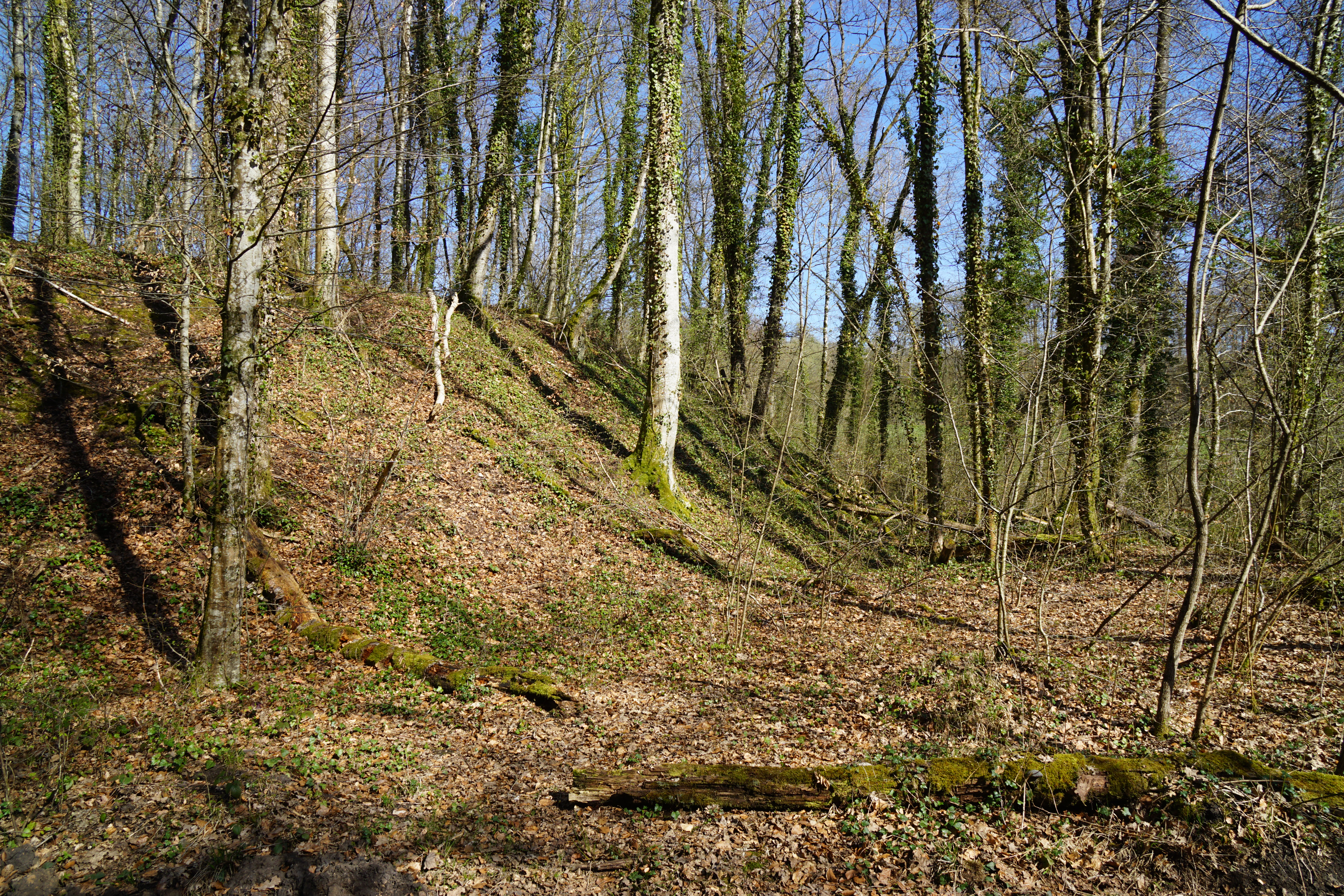
End.

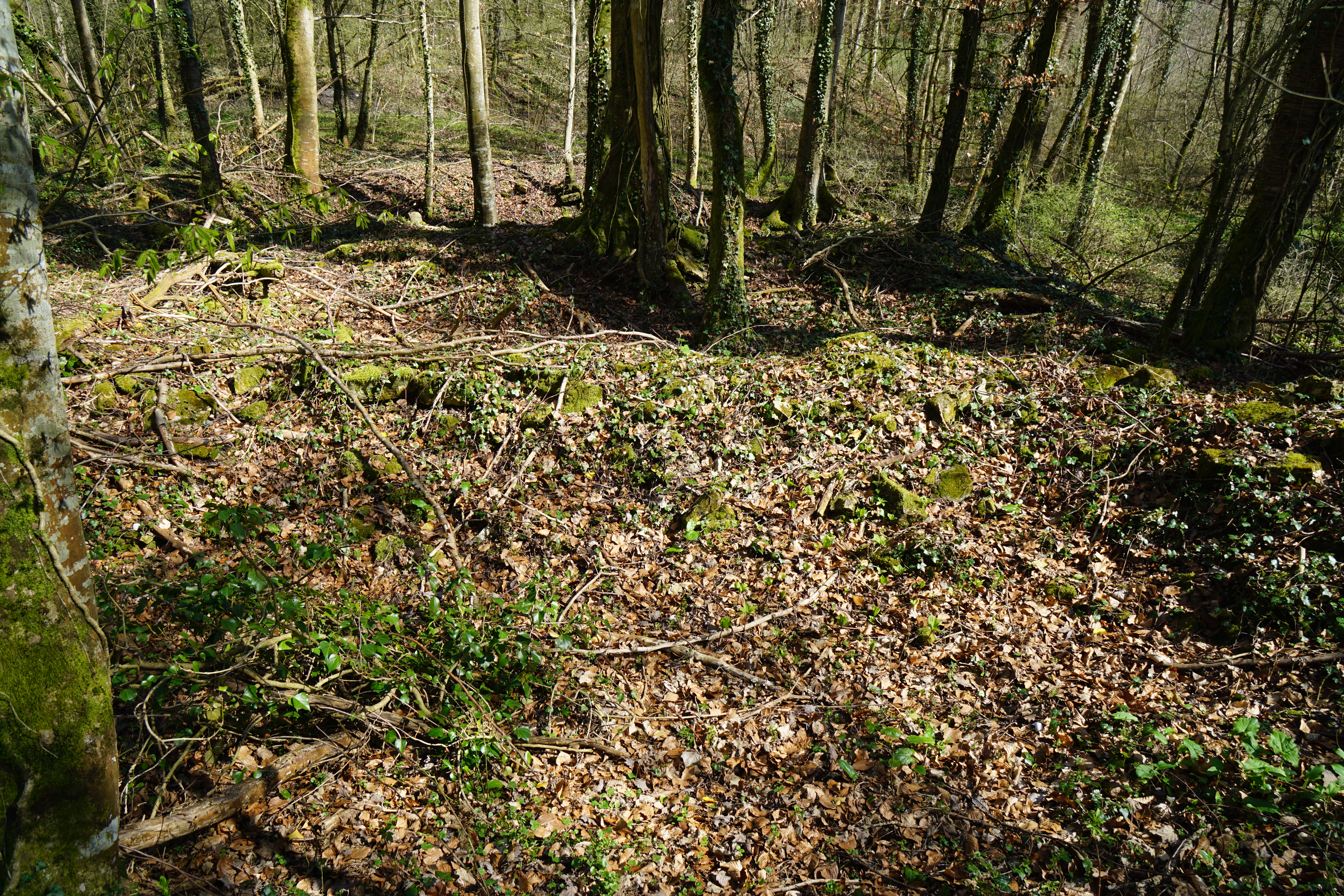
Plunging view.

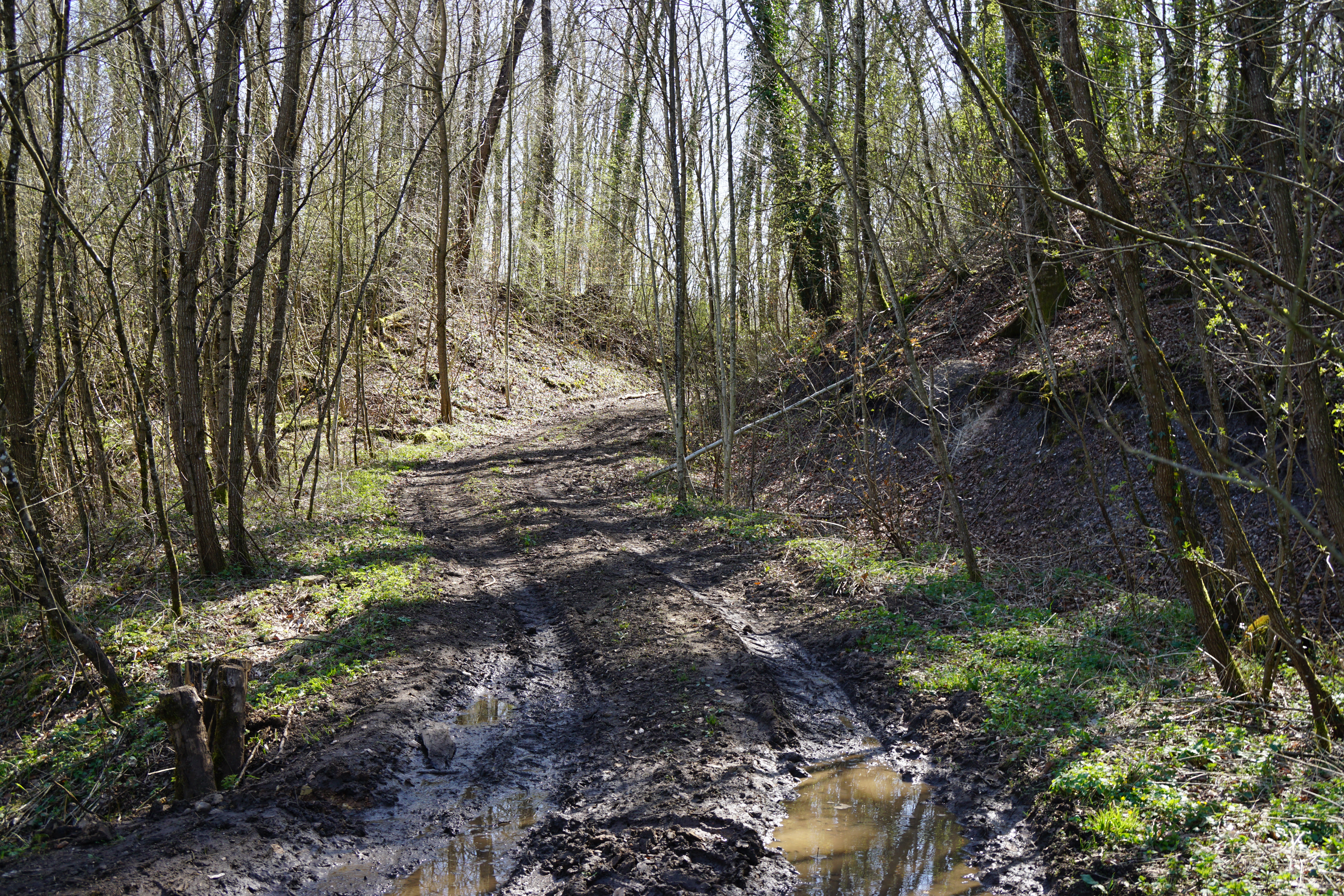
Path cutting the slag heap in two.

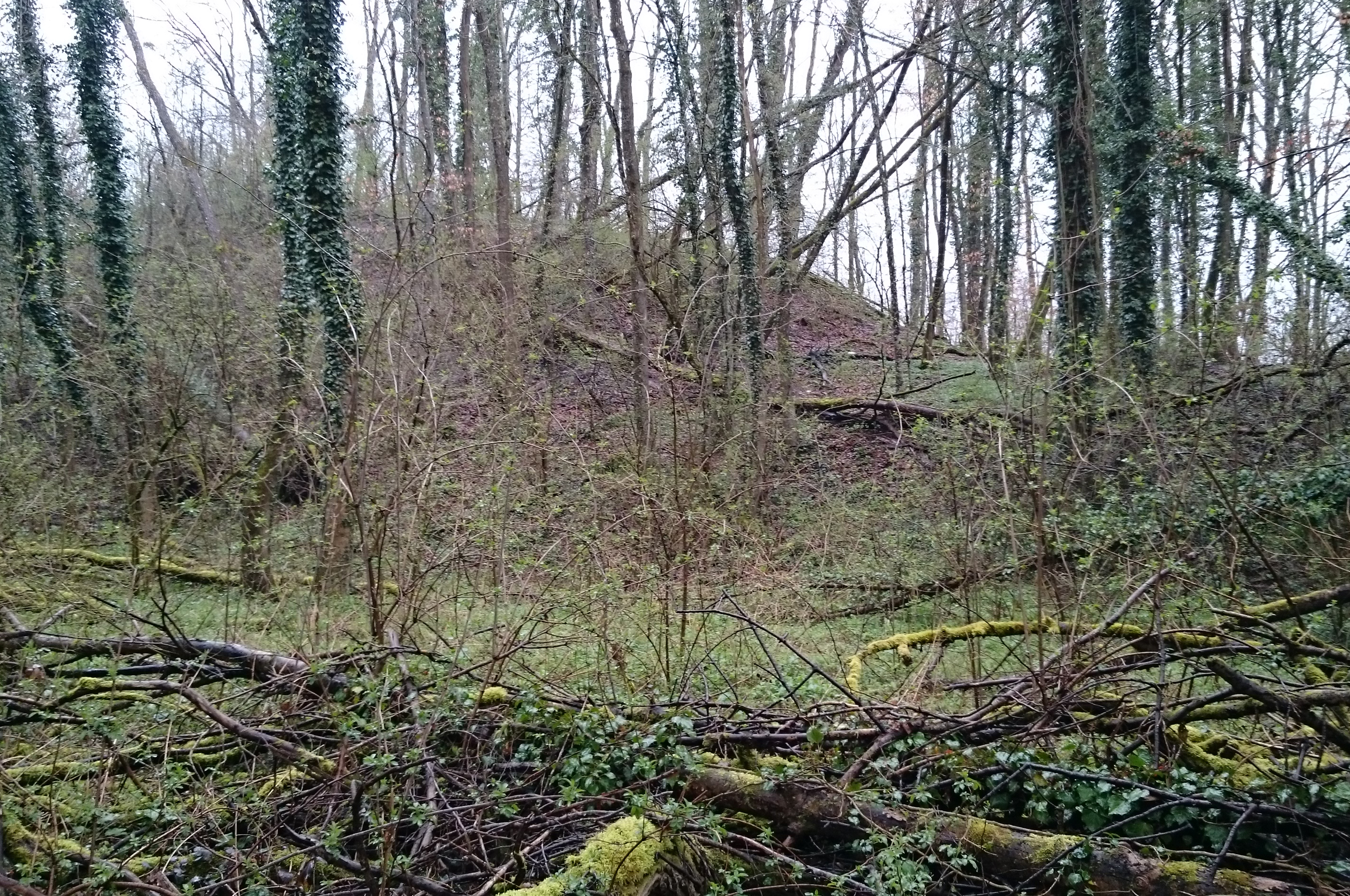
High point.

=== Shaft No. 5 ===
47°35′59″N 6°29′01″E

This 15-meter-deep shaft, designated as Ventilated Shaft No. 6, was constructed in December 1833. Following its establishment, it was connected to Shaft No. 4, which was ventilated using a wooden chimney and subsequently replaced with a metal one. The shaft had a rectangular section measuring 2.66 meters by 1.33 meters. In 1847, shaft No. 5 was equipped with a ventilation chimney. The yard included a building that housed the miners' forge and accommodation. As of the early 21st century, this building remains extant. The shaft is located on private property on the edge of the saltworks road.

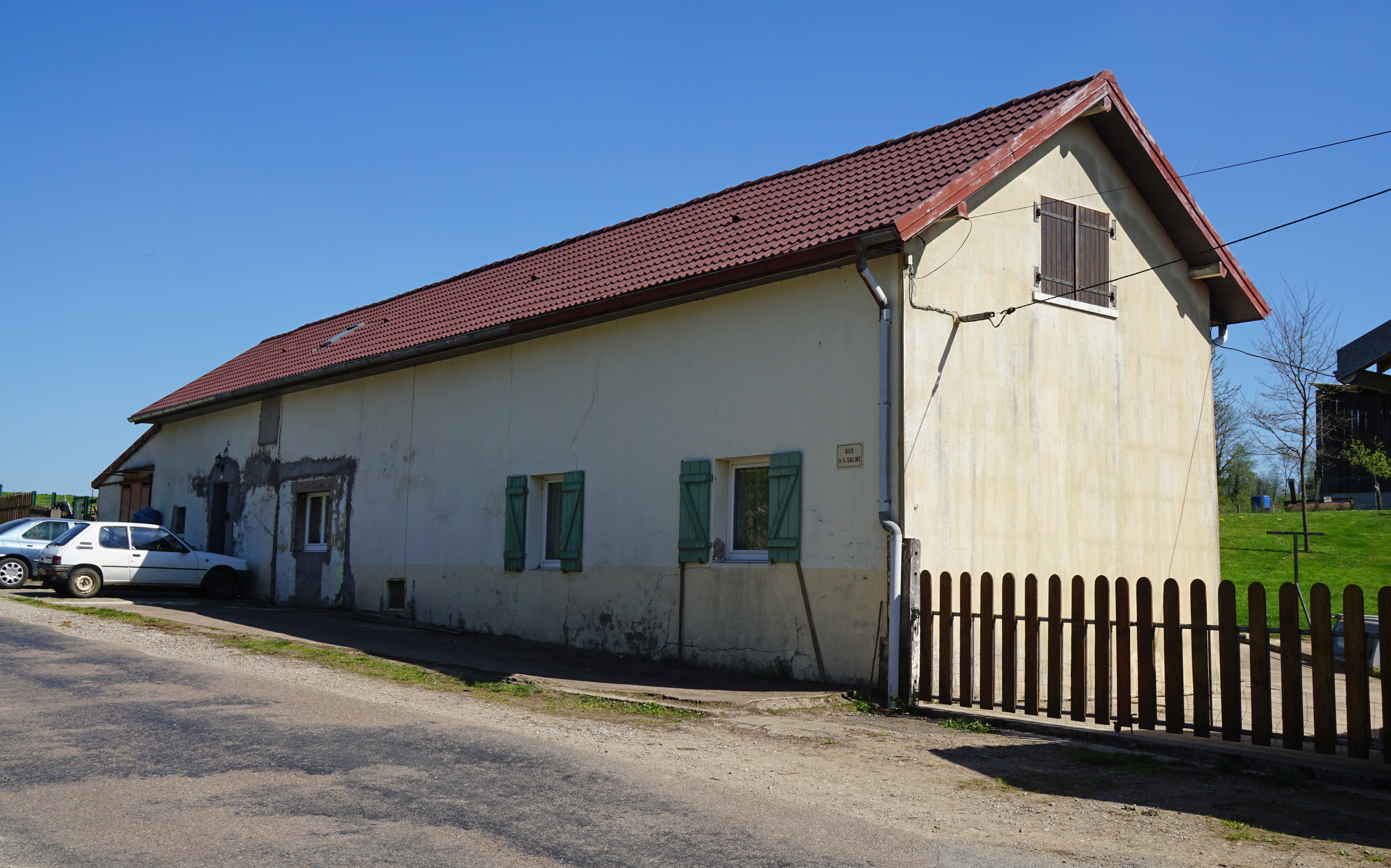
The surviving building.

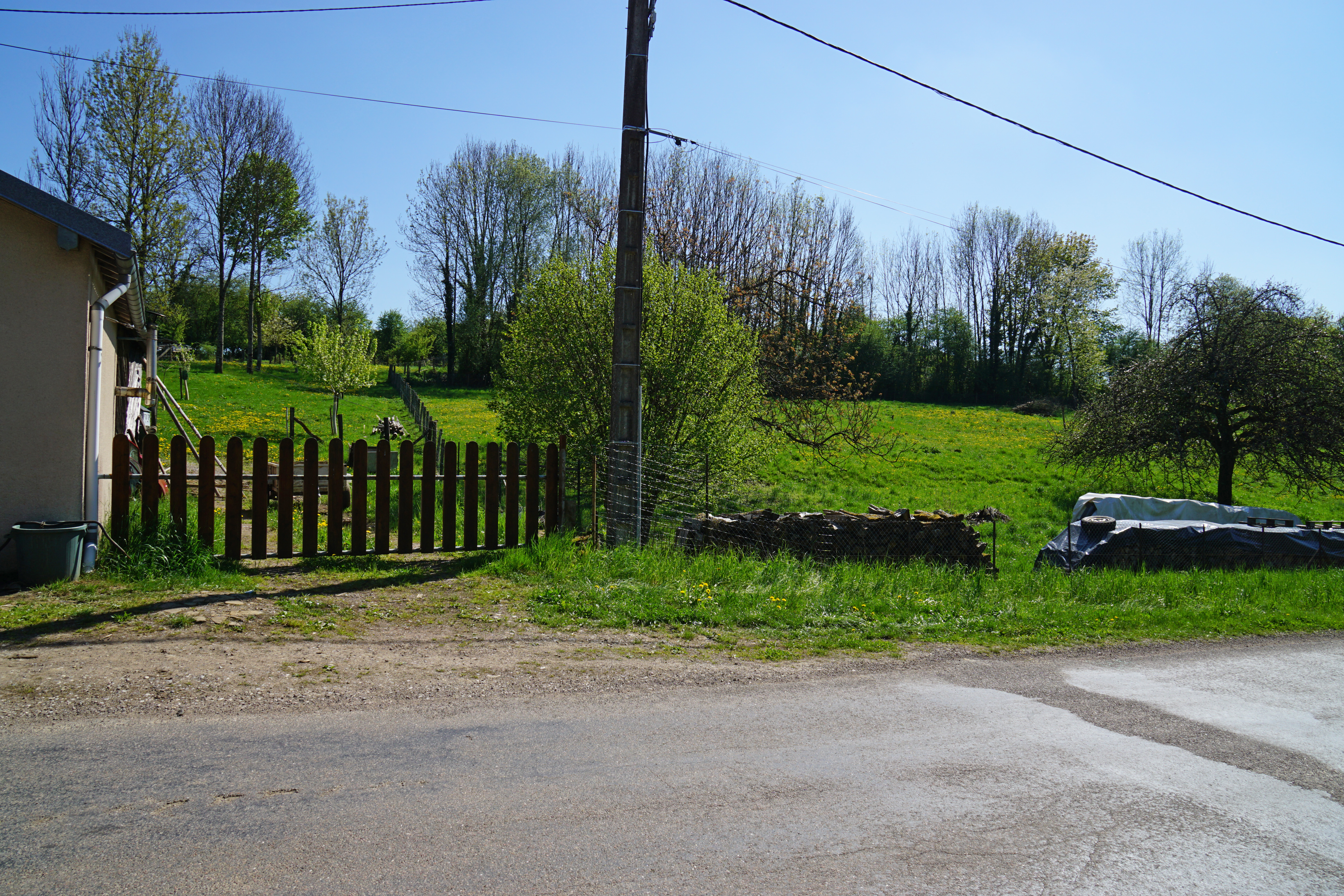
Location of shaft No. 5.

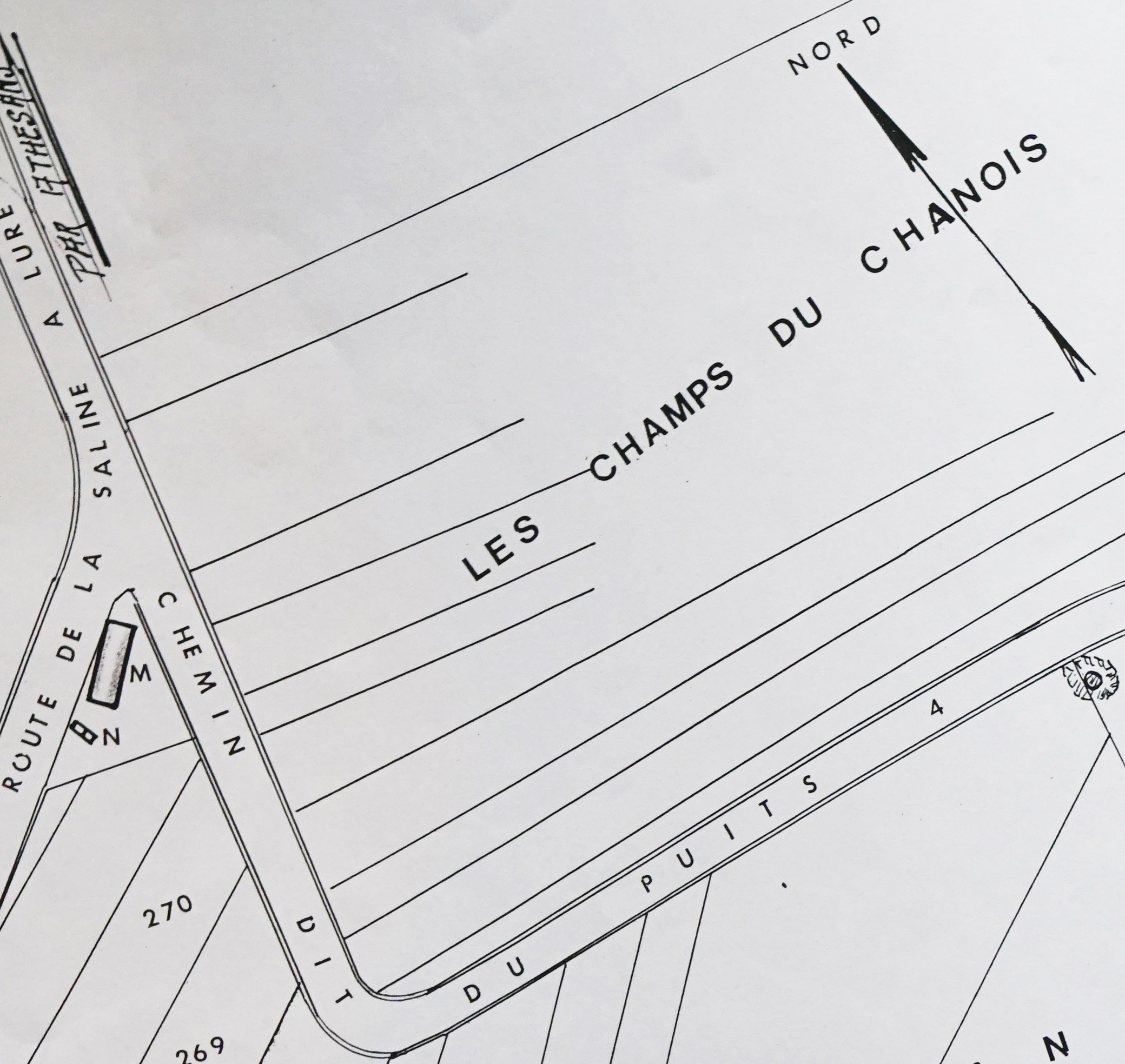
Plan of the shaft site: M. forge and living quarters; N. well and ventilation shaft.

=== Shaft No. 6 ===
47°36′01″N 6°28′19″E

Shaft No. 6 was constructed around 1830. The shaft measured 6.33 meters in depth, 3.33 meters in length, and 2.66 meters in width. The lowest point of the shaft opened on one side to a masonry drainage gallery and on the other to a 290-meter timbered extraction gallery, which provided access to a 5.39-meter shaft and, in turn, to the mining works. Subsequently, a six-meter bilge was constructed to collect the water. From 1833 onwards, the quality and quantity of coal extracted exhibited a decline. In 1834, the shaft was equipped with a horse engine that was identical to that of shaft No. 1, but with only one drum. The extracted coal was notable for its high iron and pyrite content. In the spring of 1836, it was the sole operational shaft, with a workforce of thirty. A total of 21,042 quintals of coal were extracted from this shaft between August 1836 and January 1837. However, the extraction of coal from this shaft ultimately reached its limit. In 1837, coal was extracted from the old workings of shaft No. 5 using the room and pillar method, as well as from the faulted area of shaft No. 1. This resulted in the extraction of 17,614 quintals of coal, despite the challenging circumstances, until the end of the year. The shaft ceased extraction in 1839.

The location of the shaft was altered during the construction of the "horse engine" station, and the shaft opening was concealed beneath a layer of debris measuring several meters in depth. It was subsequently relocated to the schoolyard and then to the courtyard of the Café des Salines. In the early years of the 21st century, the shaft was located on private property within the boundaries of a garden.

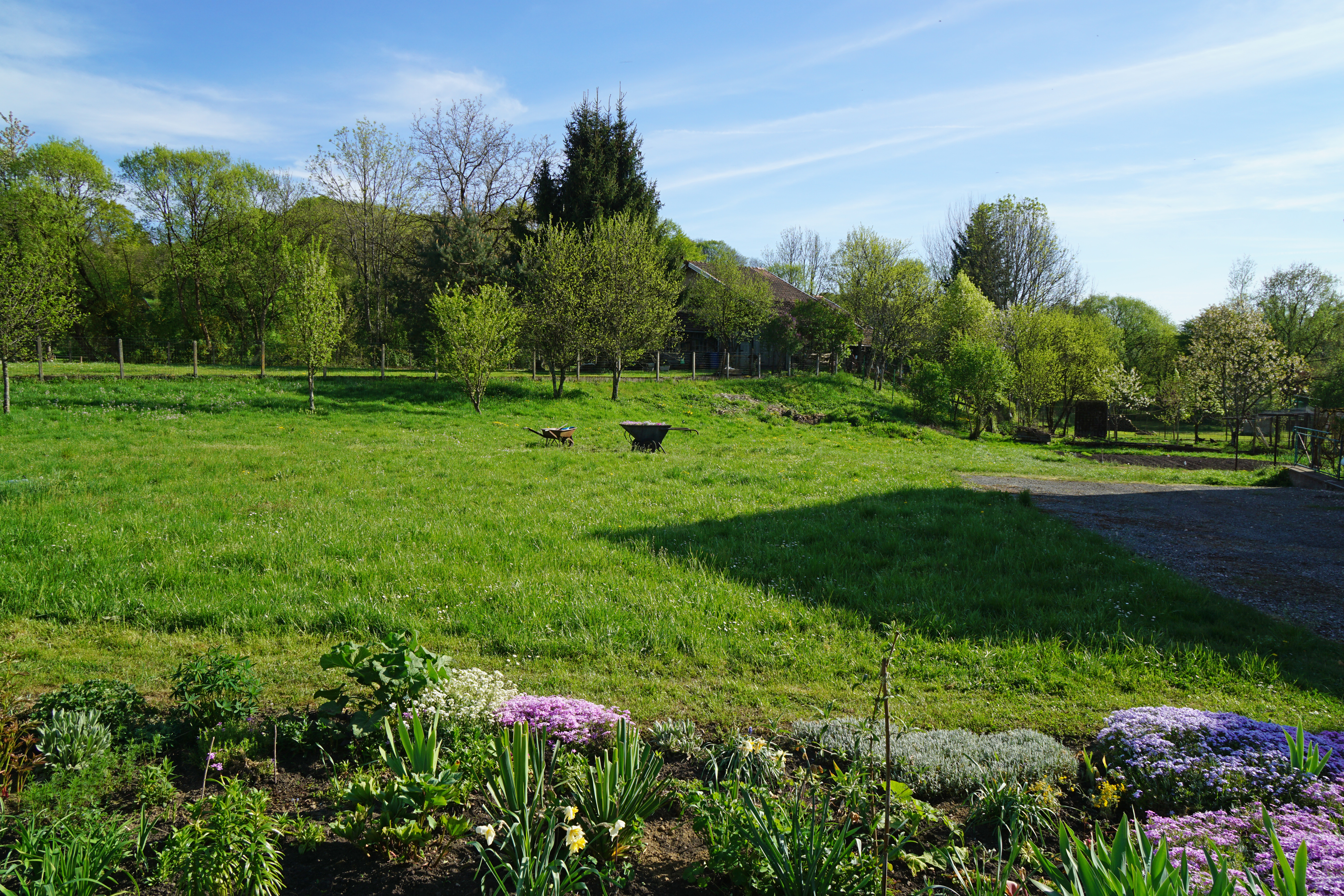
Location of shaft No. 6.

=== Shaft No. 7 ===
47°35′55″N 6°29′49″E

Shaft No. 7 is an exploratory shaft that was initiated at the beginning of 1833, situated 1.2 km east of the mining operations. It has a rectangular cross-section of 2.30 meters by 1 meter and intersects two layers of earthy coal at 8 and 10 meters below the surface, respectively. Upon reaching a depth of 25 meters, the poor quality of the rocks and the abundance of water resulted in the shaft's abandonment.

=== Shaft No. 9 ===
47°35′59″N 6°29′33″E

Shaft No. 9 was excavated in 1848, and a structure was erected on the site. In 1850, the shaft encountered coal deposits. Three exploratory galleries were constructed to trace the main coal seam and assess its quality over time (in particular, the concentration of pyrite) and to follow two secondary seams that were too thin to be economically viable. A significant fault separated these works from those of Shaft No. 4. In 1852, a railway was constructed to connect the shaft to the saltworks, which commenced operations with an 8 hp steam engine and two cast iron pumps, reaching a depth of 36.5 meters. The site also housed a master miner's residence.

As of the early 21st century, the shaft was located near a field, behind the former master miner's residence.

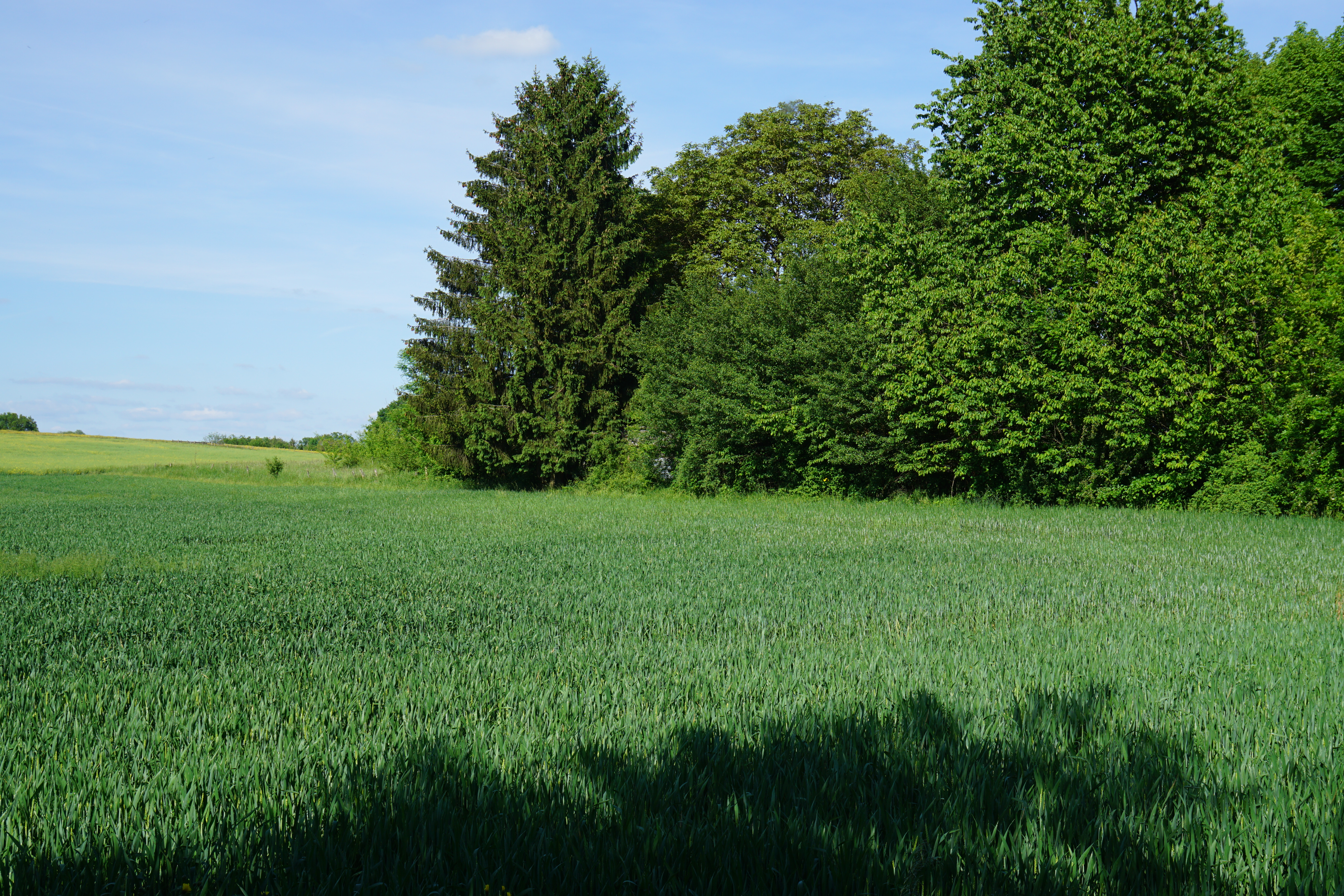
Location of shaft No. 9.

=== Shaft No. 10 ===
47°36′09″N 6°29′26″E

Shaft No. 10 was constructed at a location designated as Chanois, commencing on 10 August 1863, to replace Shaft No. 4, which had reached its maximum capacity. This colliery was operational from September 1864 to February 1874. With a depth of 37.60 meters, the shaft was equipped with a 30-hp steam engine and exploited a 0.60-meter-thick layer of high-quality coal. The extraction compartment was rectangular, measuring 2.08 meters in length and 1.52 meters in width. In August 1866, flooding of the galleries situated to the south of the mine was caused by the ingress of water from Shaft No. 4. This was successfully resolved after 12 days of pumping. It was imperative to prioritize coal extraction in this area due to the imminent threat of flooding. This phase of the project was concluded in late 1867. As the works approached Shaft No. 9 in November 1866, the coal encountered was increasingly hard and pyritic, separated by an increasing layer of barren material. In November 1867, one of the boilers was found to be leaking, necessitating repairs. Arm towers were installed on each shaft compartment to facilitate the continued extraction of coal at a rate of 45 tons per day. In December 1867, a gallery was constructed to exploit a coal mass that had been left by Shaft No. 1. On 5 January 1868, the extraction machine's spindle was fractured in two locations due to the presence of defective sleeves. This resulted in a cart colliding with the sump following the rupture of the loading chamber. The released cable ascended, departed from the bilge, and wrapped around the spool. The repairs were conducted over five days, using the configuration from the preceding boiler alteration to prevent disruption to the extraction process. In February, the endeavors directed towards Shaft No. 9 were terminated due to the inferior quality of the coal; conversely, the endeavors directed towards the outcrops of Shaft No. 1 were successful in exploiting a highly superior quality seam.

To improve ventilation, which was found to be inadequate during the summer months, a "toc-fire" (fireplace and air intake chimney) was installed in June 1868. In July, the mine had five operational sites to the north, four to the east, four to the south, and seven to the west. In 1869, shale was extracted and used in the chemical factory for the production of alum. In January and February 1870, the headframe, which overlooked the surrounding plains, was used by Prussian troops as an observation point during the Battle of Villersexel. The shaft was exhausted in February 1872, rendering it inadequate for ensuring salt production. Consequently, the quantity of salt produced by the shaft declined from 122,000 quintals in 1870 to 93,000 quintals in 1871 and 73,434 quintals in 1872. The subsequent shafts in operation were No. 11 and 13.

As of the early 21st century, the spoil heap and the shaft's location can be found on the outskirts of a forested area.

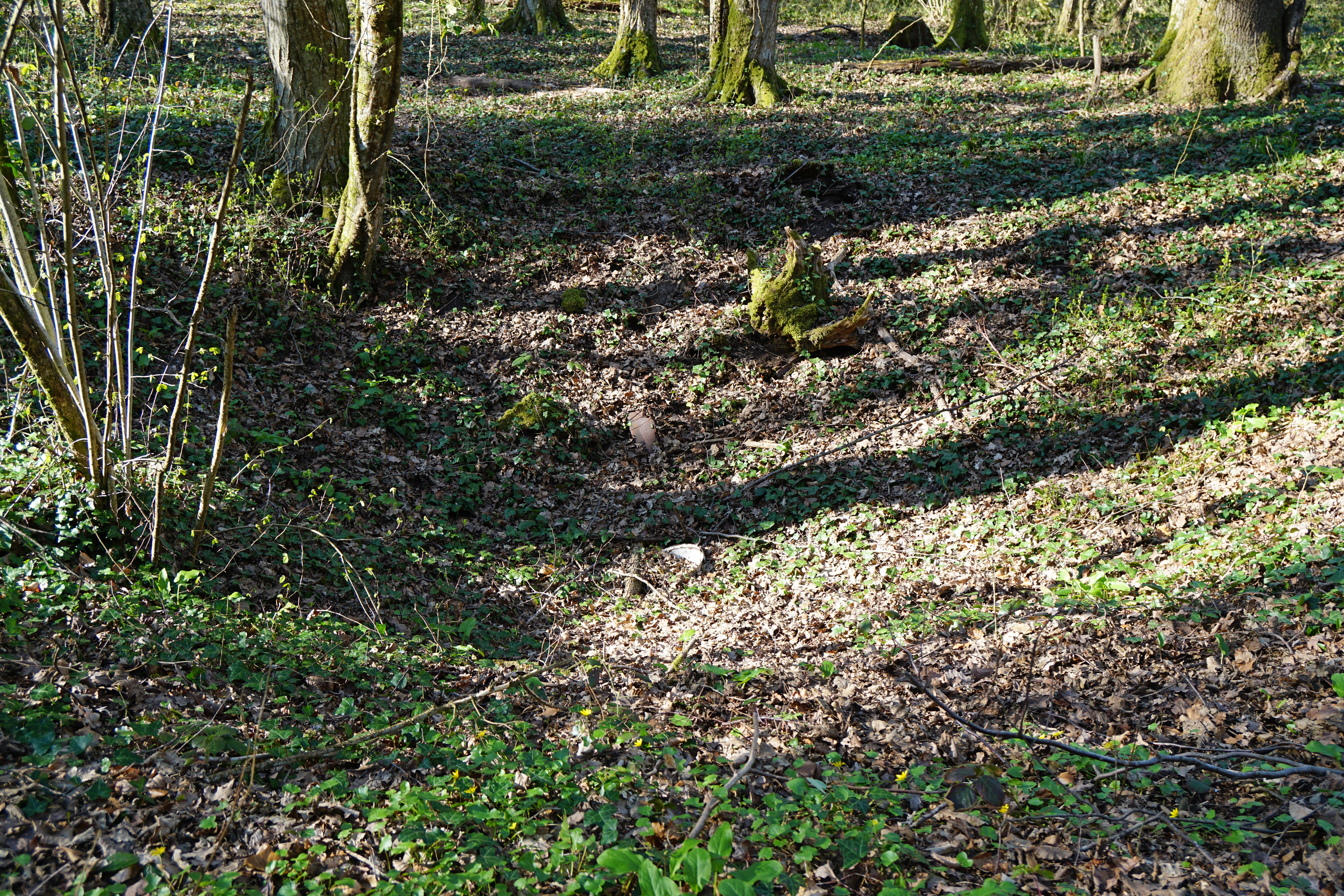
Shaft location.

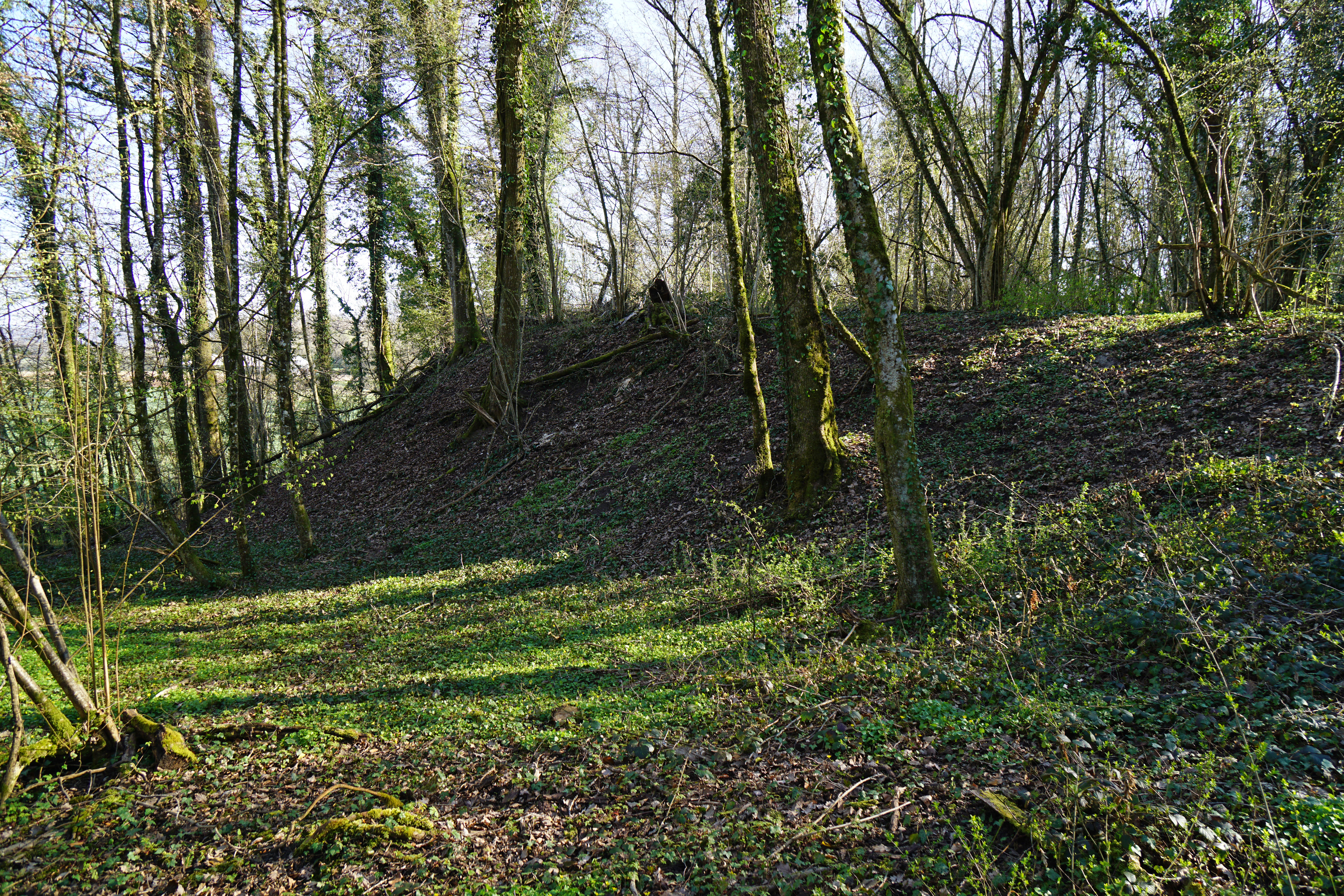
The spoil heap.

=== Shaft No. 11 ===
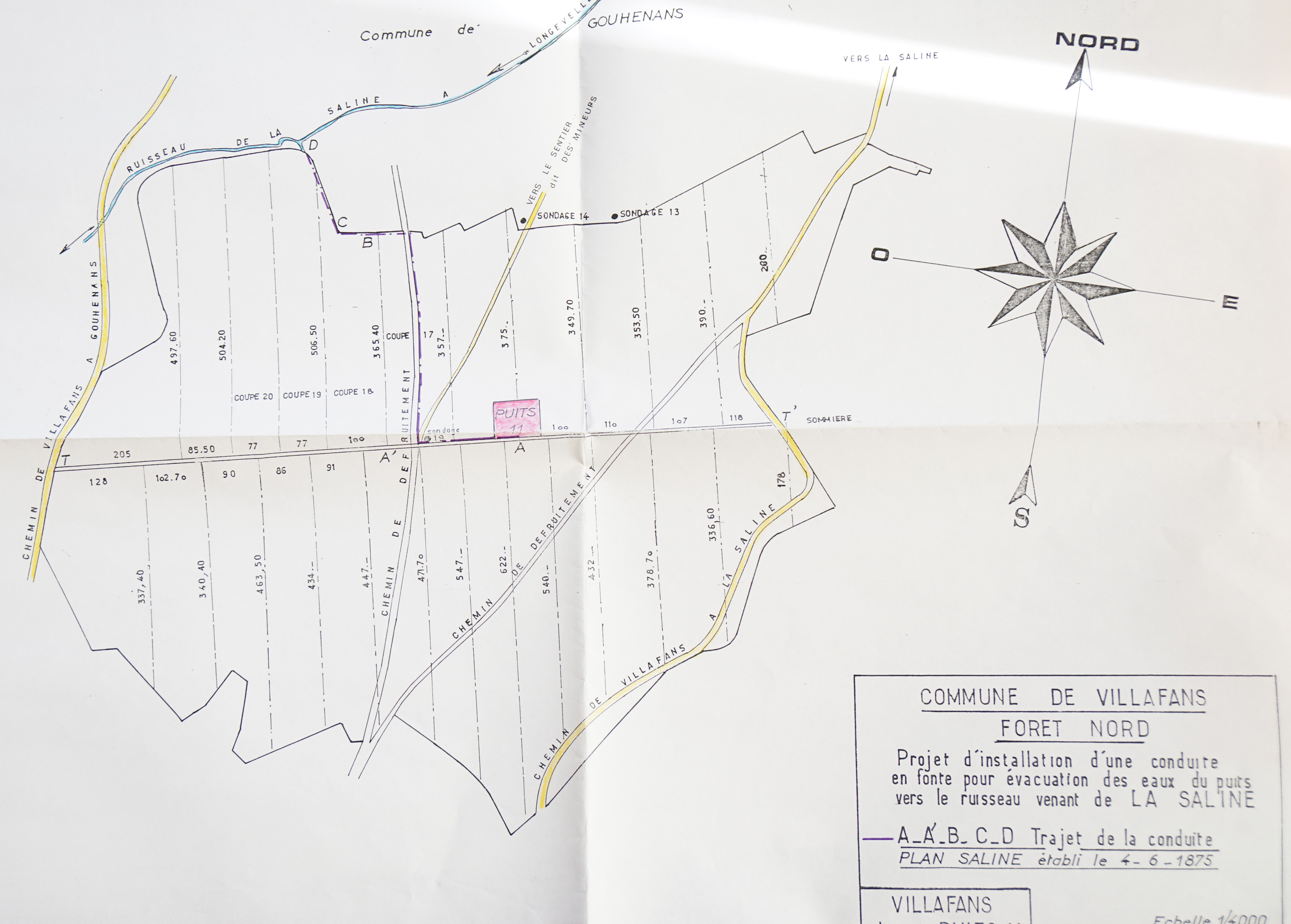
Implementation of shaft No. 11 in the Villafans forest.

47°35′30″N 6°28′31″E

Following its submission on 5 August 1871, an application for authorization to commence excavation of Shaft No. 11 was approved on 8 September. Subsequently, exploratory drilling of No. 19 was initiated. At a depth of 75.34 meters, exploratory drilling intersected a coal seam measuring 0.9 meters in thickness. The shaft was ultimately constructed in the forest region to the north of Villafans, commencing in March 1872. On 15 June 1873, a high-quality hard coal seam measuring 1.2 meters in thickness was encountered. The shaft was completed at a depth of 76 meters in July. The shaft had a rectangular cross-section of 3.68 meters by 1.52 meters and was timbered with frames. The shaft was subdivided into four distinct compartments, each serving a specific purpose. The first compartment was designated for ladders used by workers, the second for ventilation, and the remaining two for extraction. In October 1873, the shaft produced 600 tons, in February 1874, 1,600 tons, and in March 1874, 1,800 tons. On 9 December 1874, a collapse resulted in one fatality and one serious injury, marking the first accident attributed to the use of powder. A year later, the shaft had 24 workings, each measuring 8 meters in width. In January 1876, production reached 932 tons, declining to 868 tons in February and 906 tons in March. The water inflow was 100 cubic meters per day. By August 1876, the shaft had 21 workings served by two large haulage galleries. That same year, a cast iron pipe was installed to send mine water to the saltworks stream, which flowed into the Ognon.

The coal was transported from the mine shaft to the surface via skips and mine carts. The workings, which reached a depth of approximately one hundred meters, were subject to regular inspection by the mine guard until the shaft's closure in 1893. (Note: The history of shaft No. 11 is detailed on a tourist panel on site.)

Removal of the specified area was compensated at a rate per square meter. The miners were required to provide their lighting and purchase powder from the operators, who provided timber at no additional cost. Ventilation was provided by fresh air descending into the extraction shaft, distributed among the east and west worksites, and then rising through a duct in the ladder compartment. In 1889, the shaft employed 29 miners, 13 haulers, 3 mule drivers, and a hookman, with 16 workings in operation. In 1890, the two historical exploitation sectors of the shaft (East and West) merged into one.

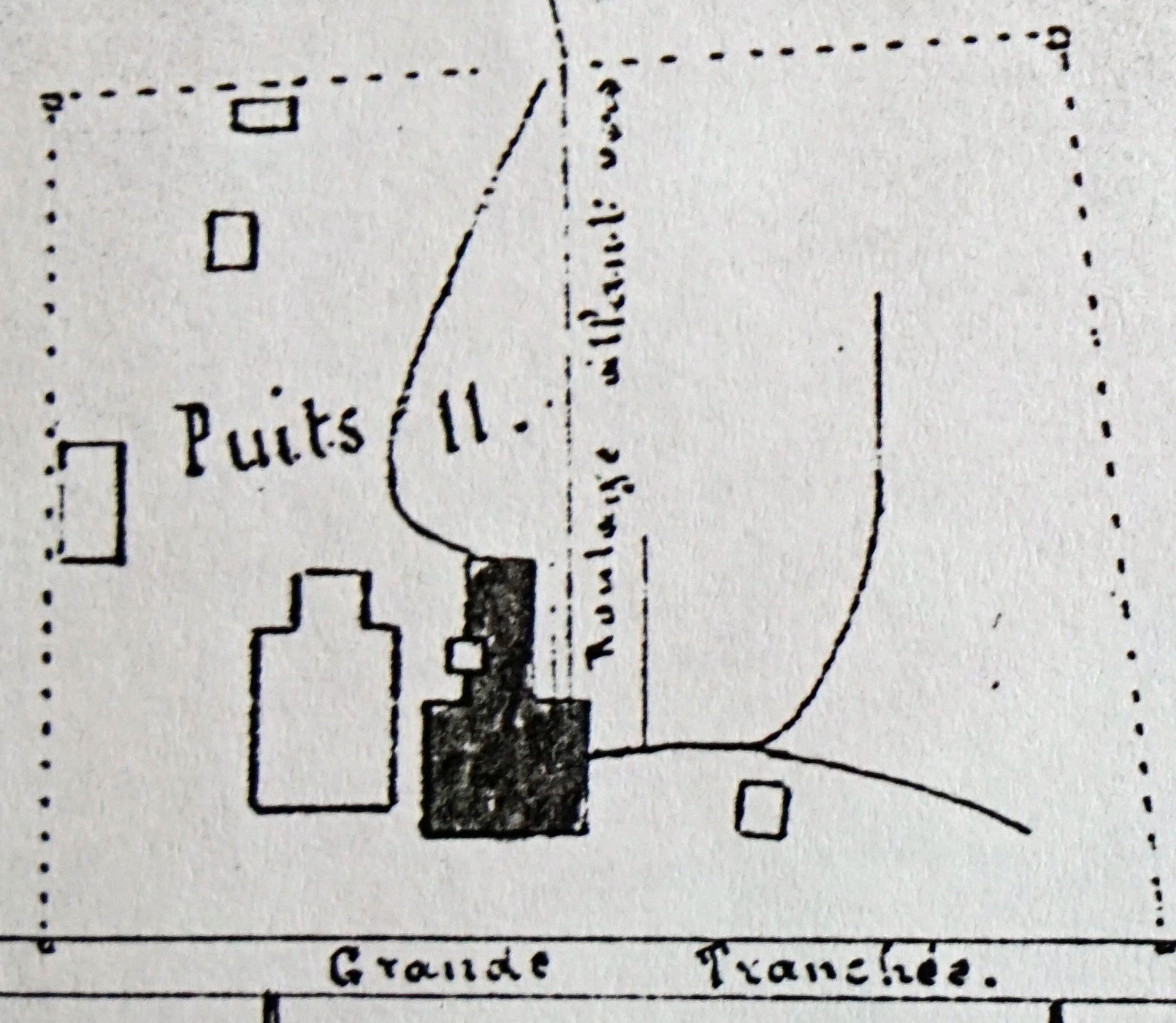
Ground plan of the shaft installations.

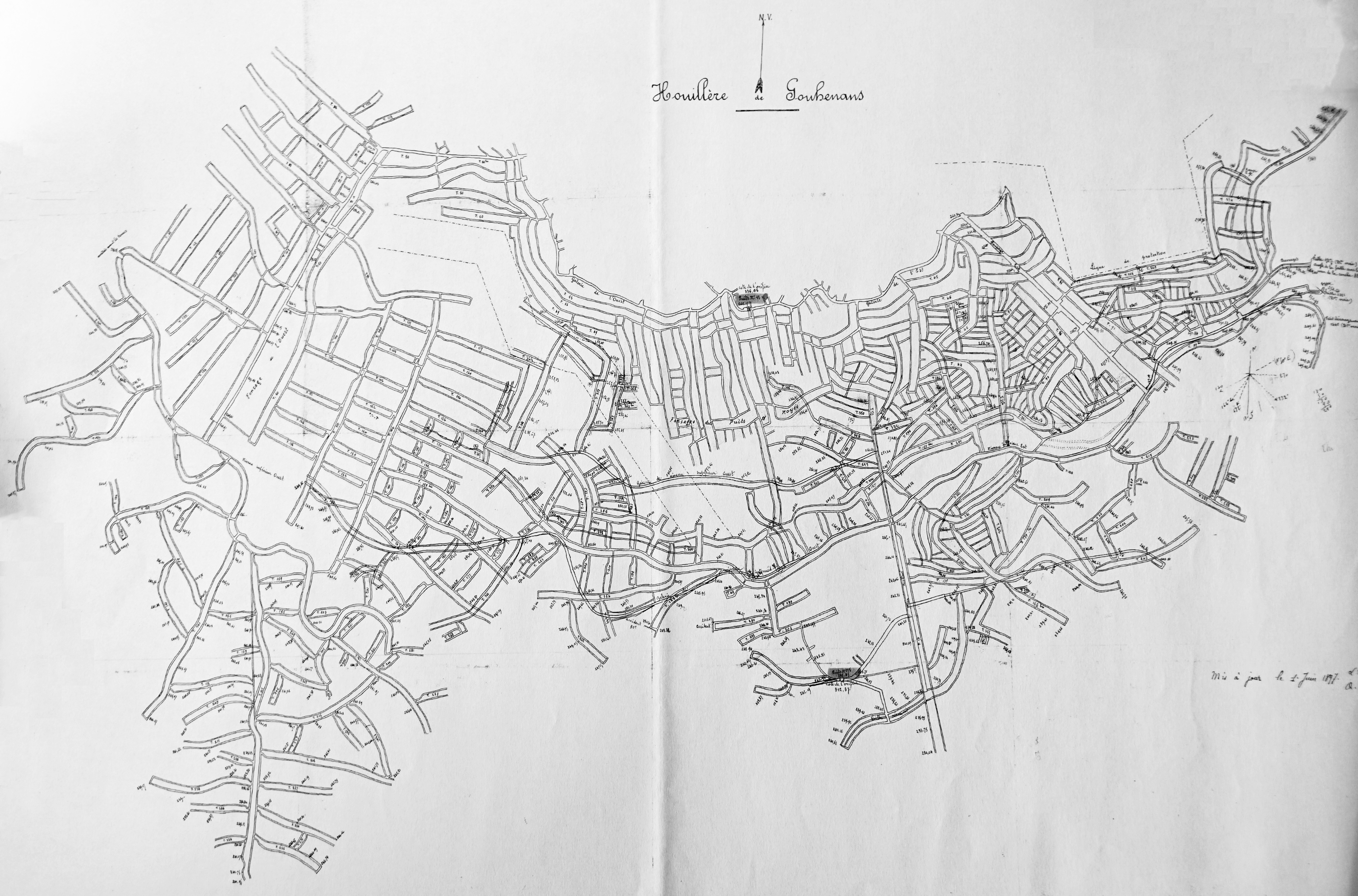
Work plan for shafts No. 11 and 15.

Extraction of the shaft ceased in 1893 and the facility was definitively closed in 1899, following the implementation of procedures to ensure the safety of workers and the ventilation in Shaft No. 15. During the dismantling process, a large horizontal boiler with two heaters was transferred to a chemical factory, repainted, and maintained for potential resale. Ultimately, the boiler was scrapped in 1936 by the Rollin Company of Lure. At the beginning of the 21st century, the spoil heap and a substantial collapse at the shaft location are visible. A lengthy spoil heap, measuring four meters in height and intersected by two bridges, connects it to Shaft No. 15.

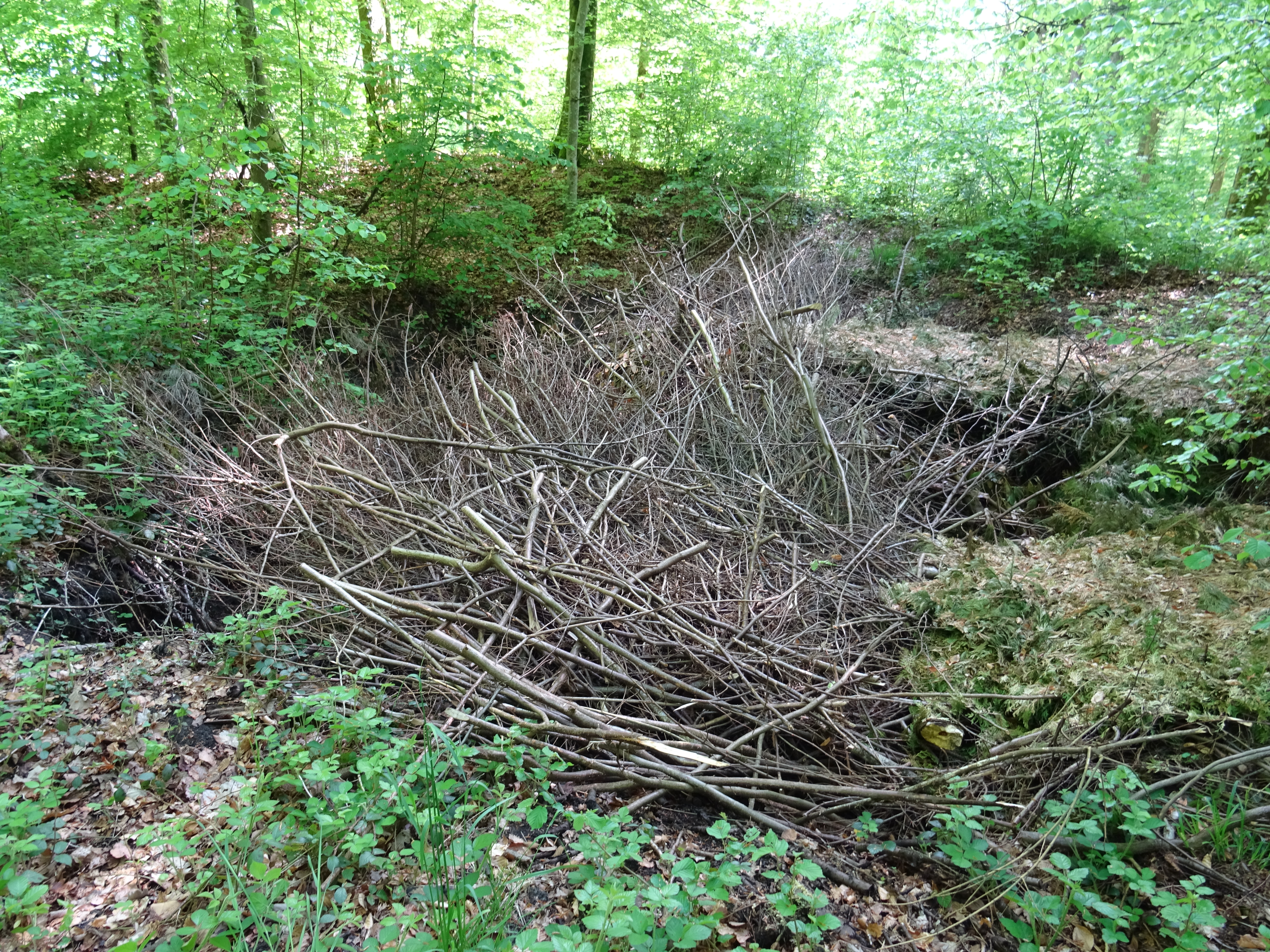
Shaft sunk and blocked by branches.

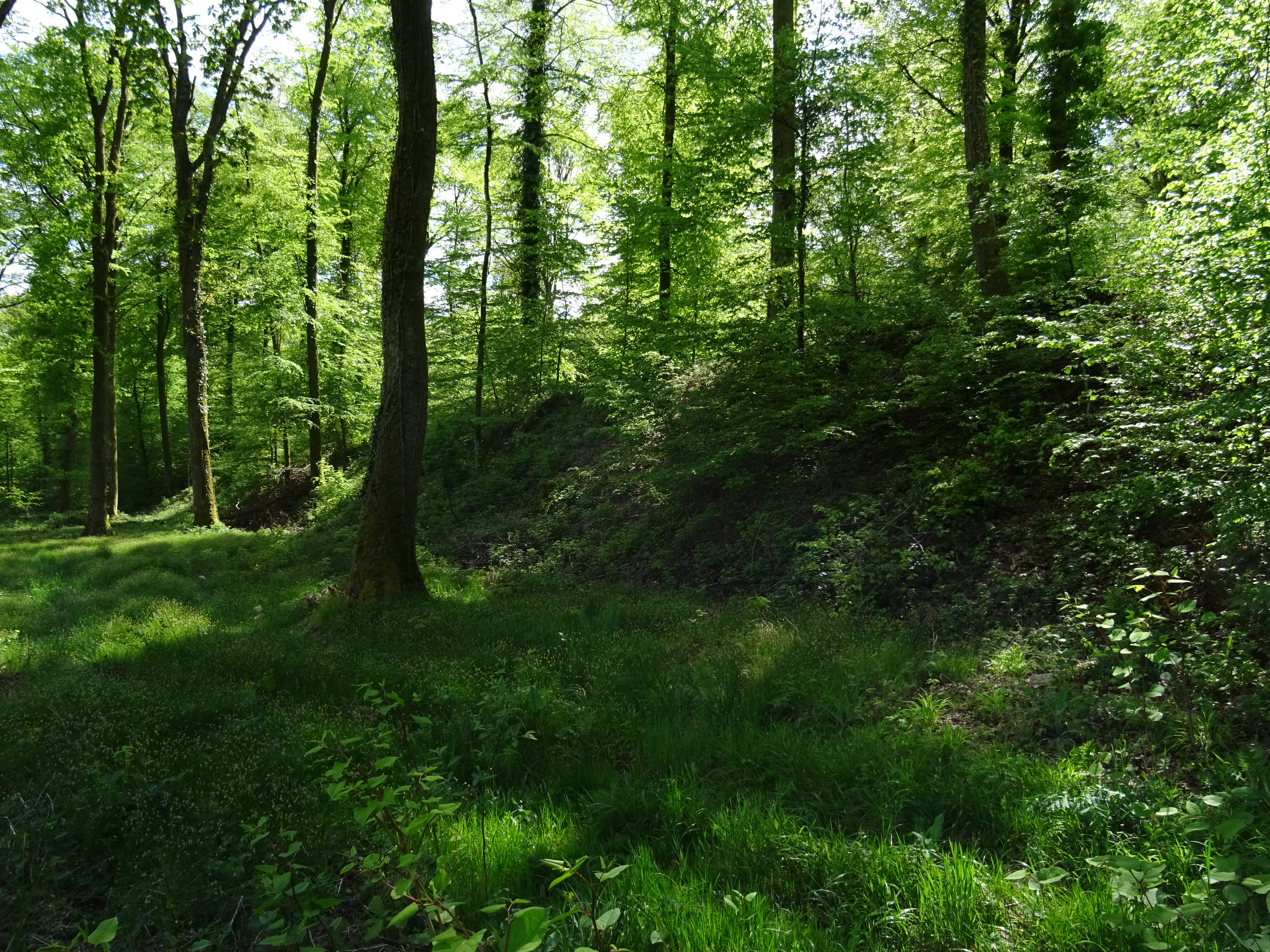
The spoil heap at shaft No. 11.

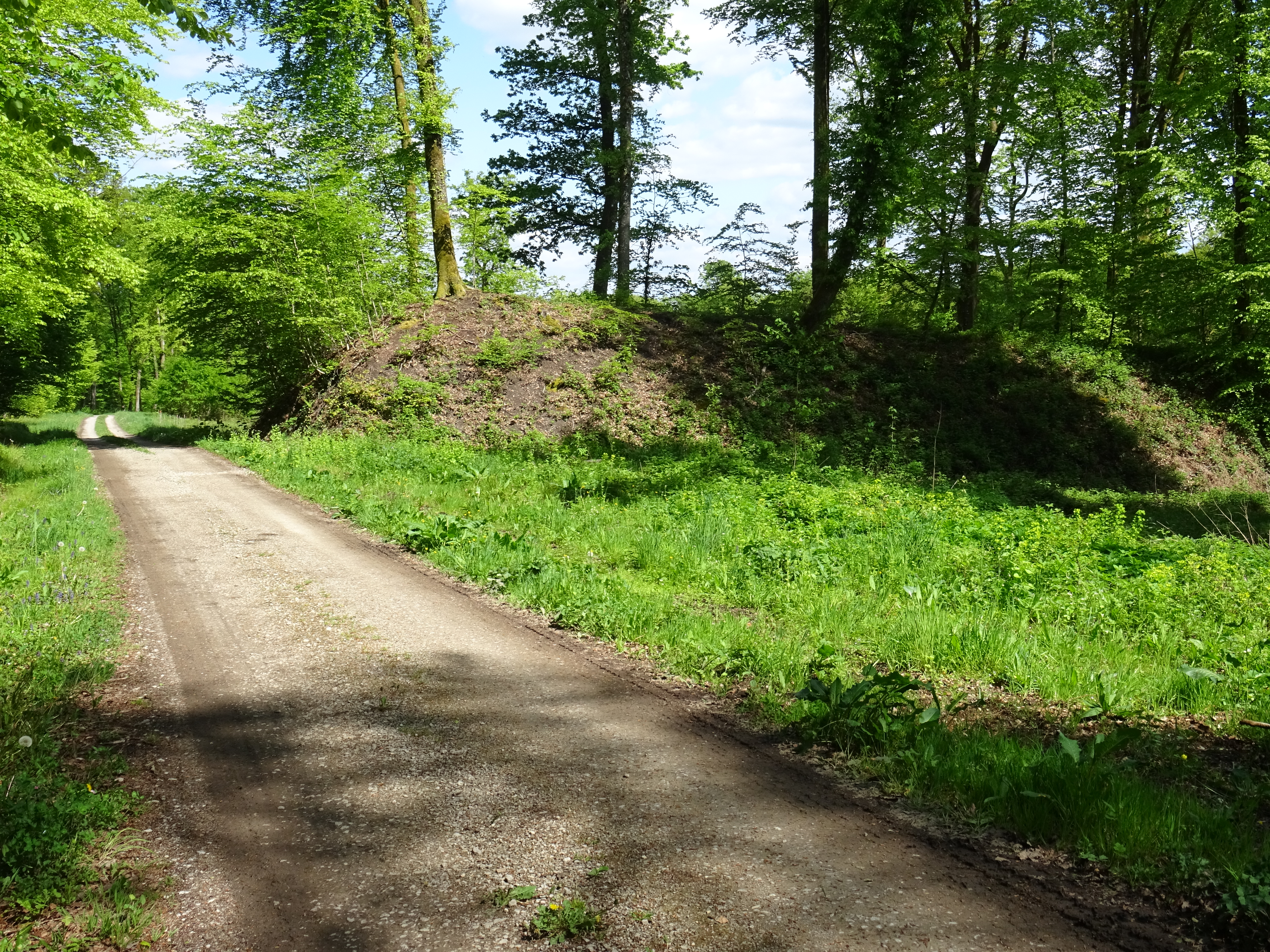
The spoil heap.

=== Shaft No. 12 ===
47°36′15″N 6°29′45″E

Shaft No. 12 is a ventilation shaft dug in 1873 and used until 1899.

At the beginning of the 21st century, a funnel remains at the shaft's location along Departmental Road 18, which bisects the spoil heap.

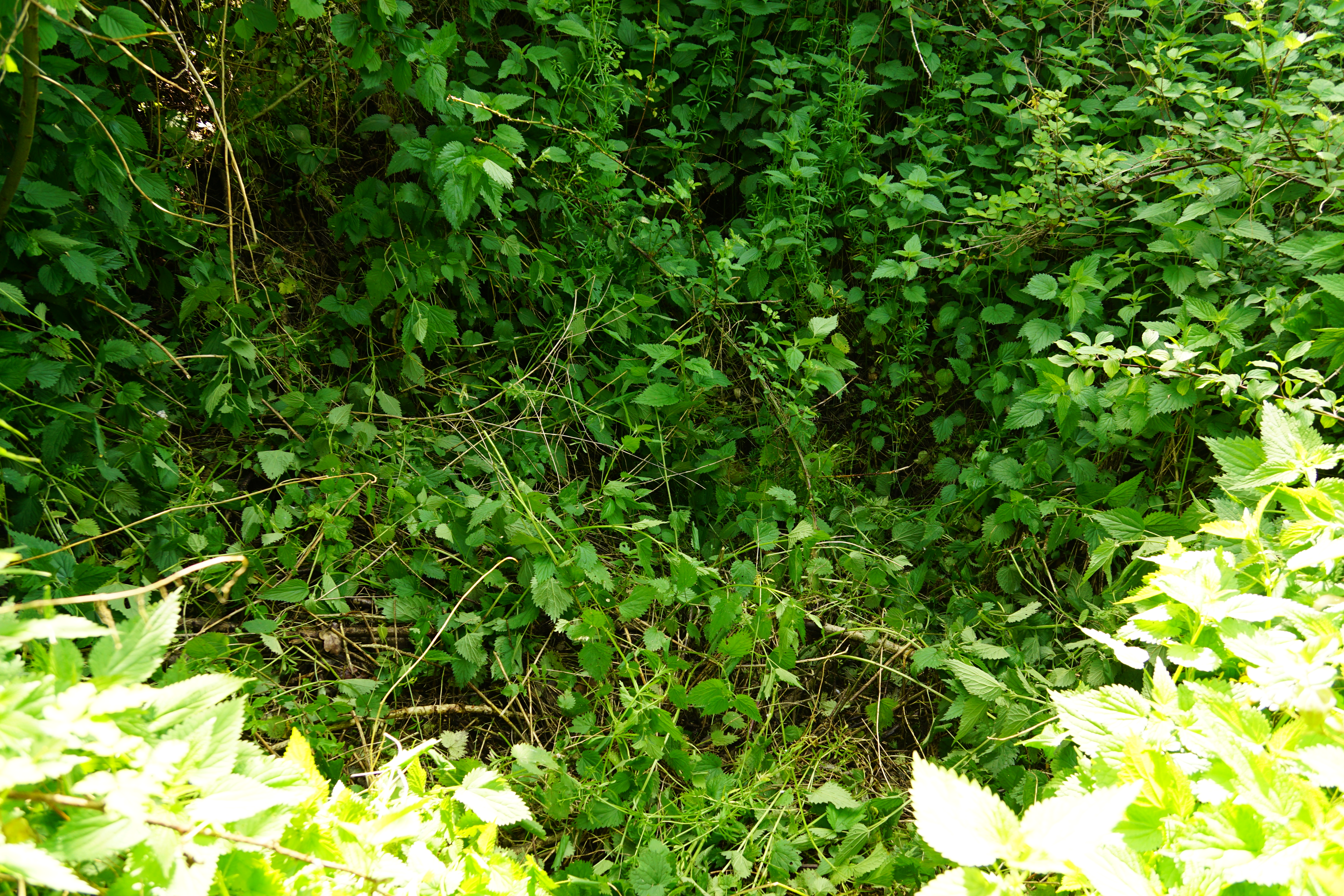
Shaft location.

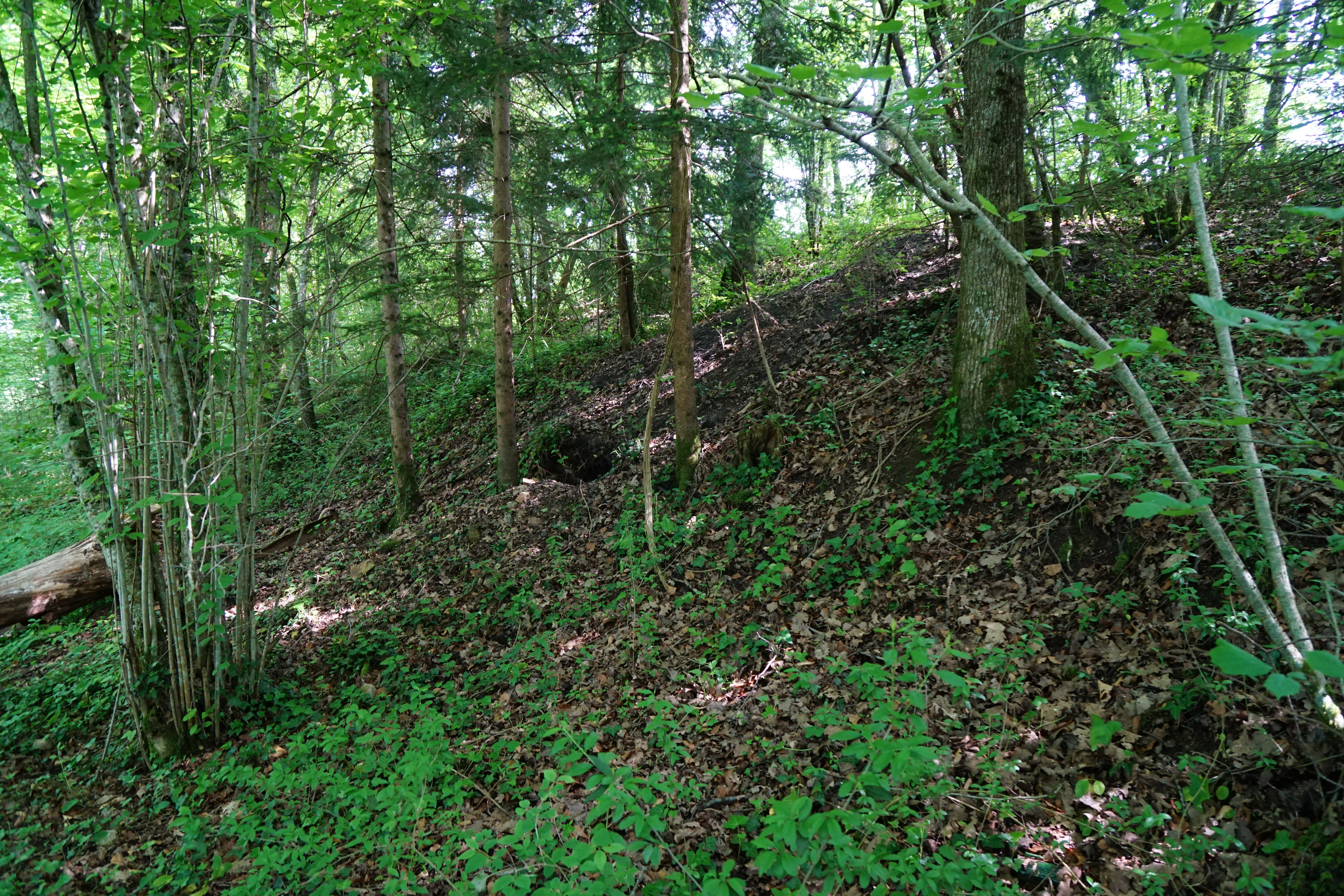
The spoil heap, north side.

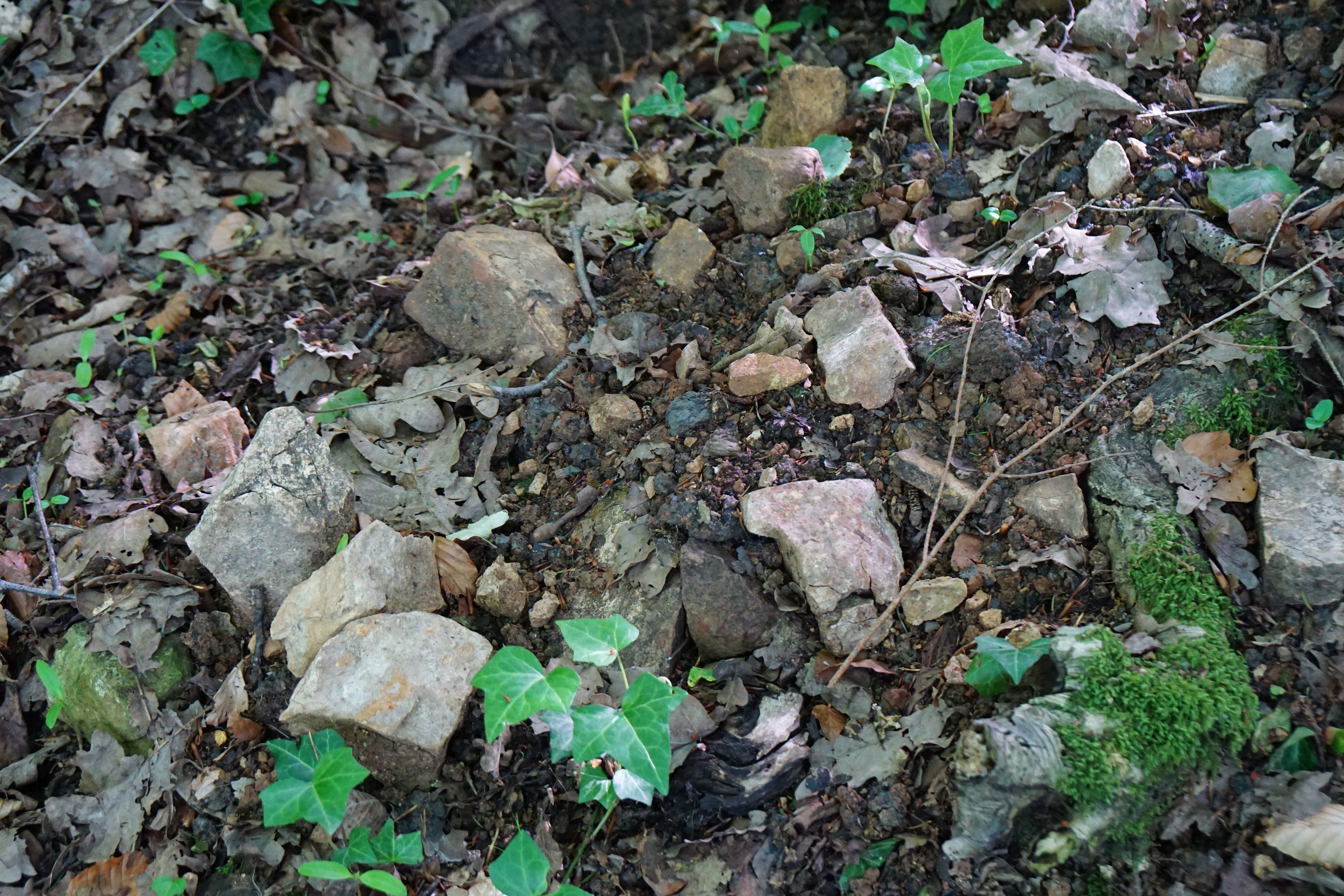
Rocks making up the spoil heap.

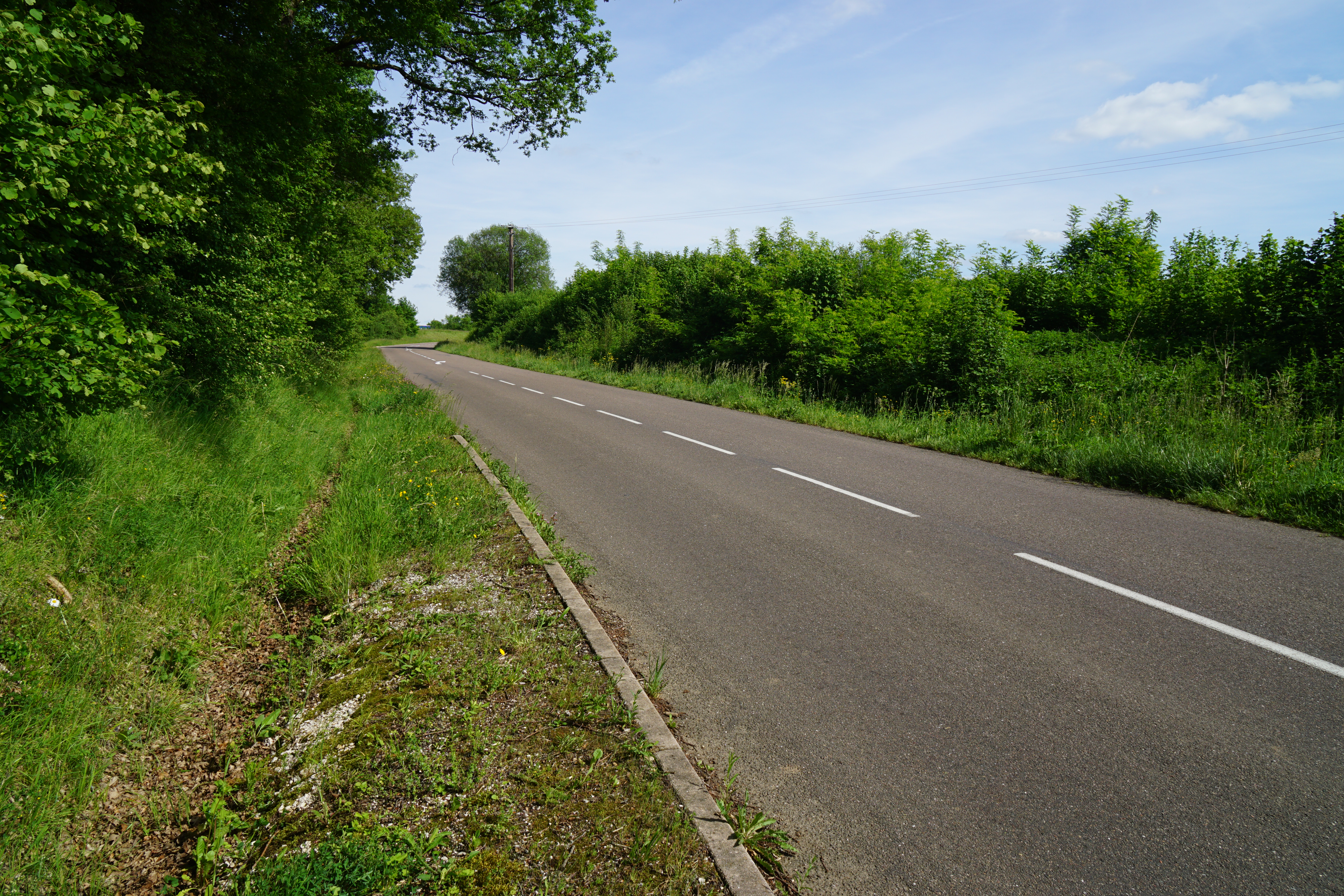
The spoil heap split in two by the RD 18.

=== Shaft No. 13 ===
47°36′15″N 6°28′37″E

In October 1873, a request for information regarding the location in question was submitted to the local population. Following the acquisition of multiple plots, the commencement of excavation took place on 22 October. The initial coal seam was located by a nearby exploratory drill at a depth of 36.65 meters. The shaft came into contact with a geological fault. The coal seam was found to have a thickness of 0.6 meters. The shaft was completed in 1874 using a horse engine. The shaft was equipped with a new headframe and a 15-horsepower horizontal two-cylinder extraction engine. A pump operated by a portable steam engine was employed to contain the water inflow, which exhibited a range of 25 to 30 cubic meters per day. The exploitation plan then provided that Shaft No. 13 would extract the coal necessary for the saltworks factories' operation, while Shaft No. 11 would extract coal for commercial sale. The exploitation of shafts ceased around 1888 due to the occurrence of terrain faults.

In 1911, the former exploratory shaft was reopened to exploit the sector of the opened New Shaft No. 17, which had been initiated in 1909. Shaft No. 13 was rectangular in section, measuring 3.50 meters by 1.35 meters, and had a depth of 50 meters. A new headframe was constructed, comprising a wooden structure through which metal cables, operated by an electric winch, passed. Shaft No. 13 was then designated as the extraction shaft, while Shaft No. 17, which was less deep and situated in closer proximity to the workings, served as the means of descent for the workers.

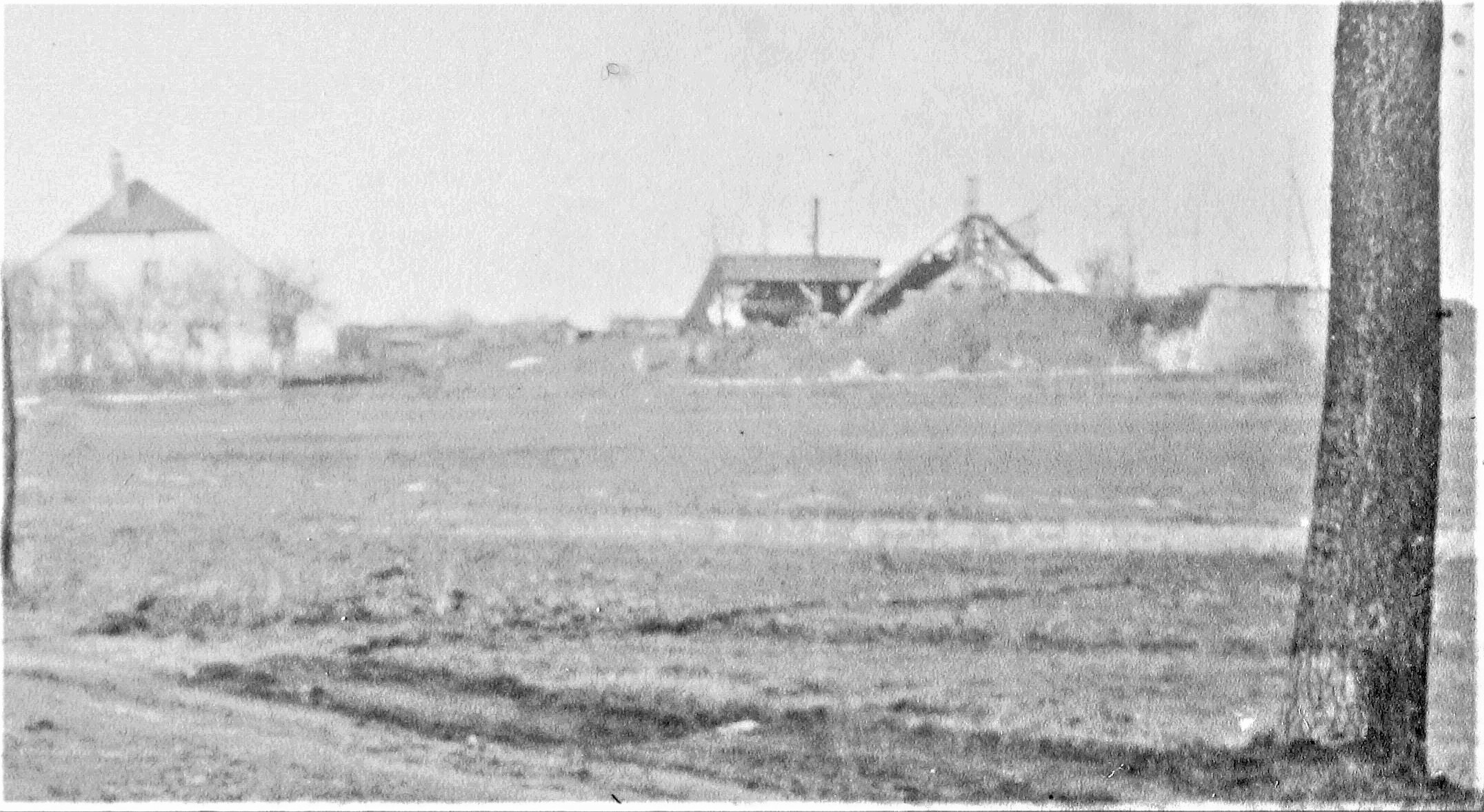
Rehabilitation of the shaft.

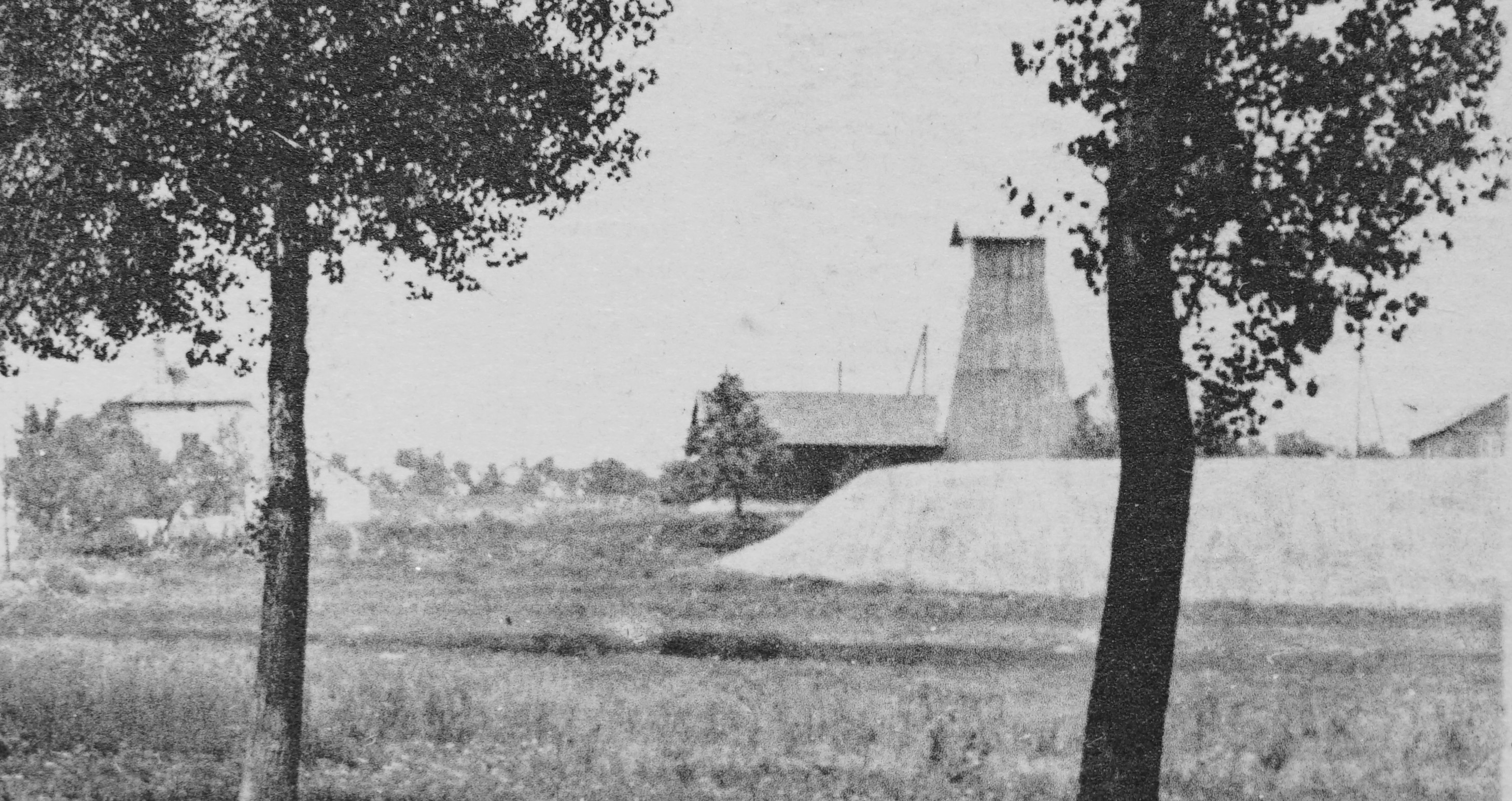
Same view with the final headframe.

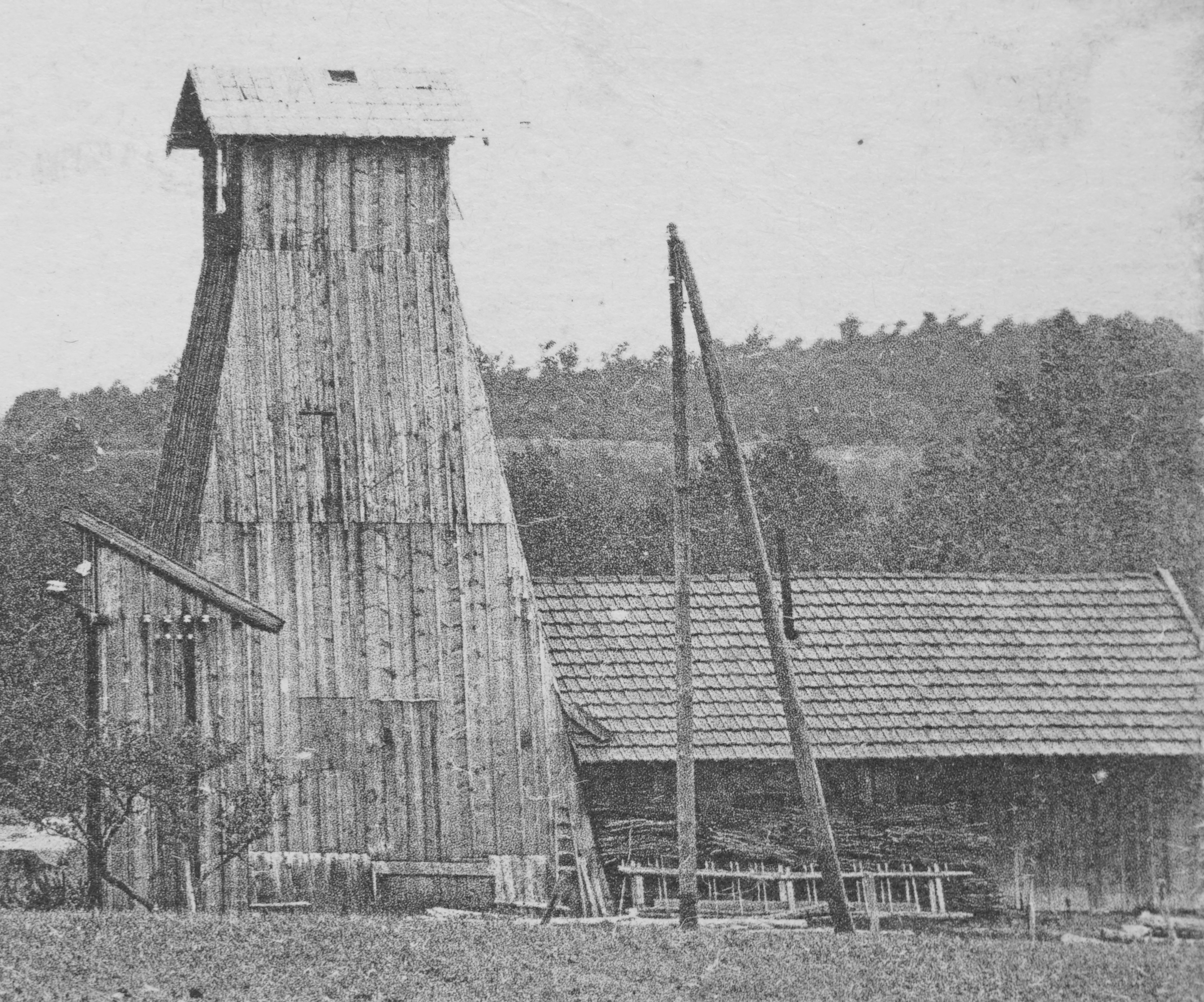
Close-up view.

The steiger's residence, situated adjacent to the roadway, was dismantled in 1989. Several modest wooden structures, including the lamp room, also ceased to exist during this period. (Note: Testimony of the owner, Mrs. May.) (Note: Aerial photography missions are available on Géoportail by year.) In the early 21st century, the debris pile and the site of the shaft were transformed into a modest private park.

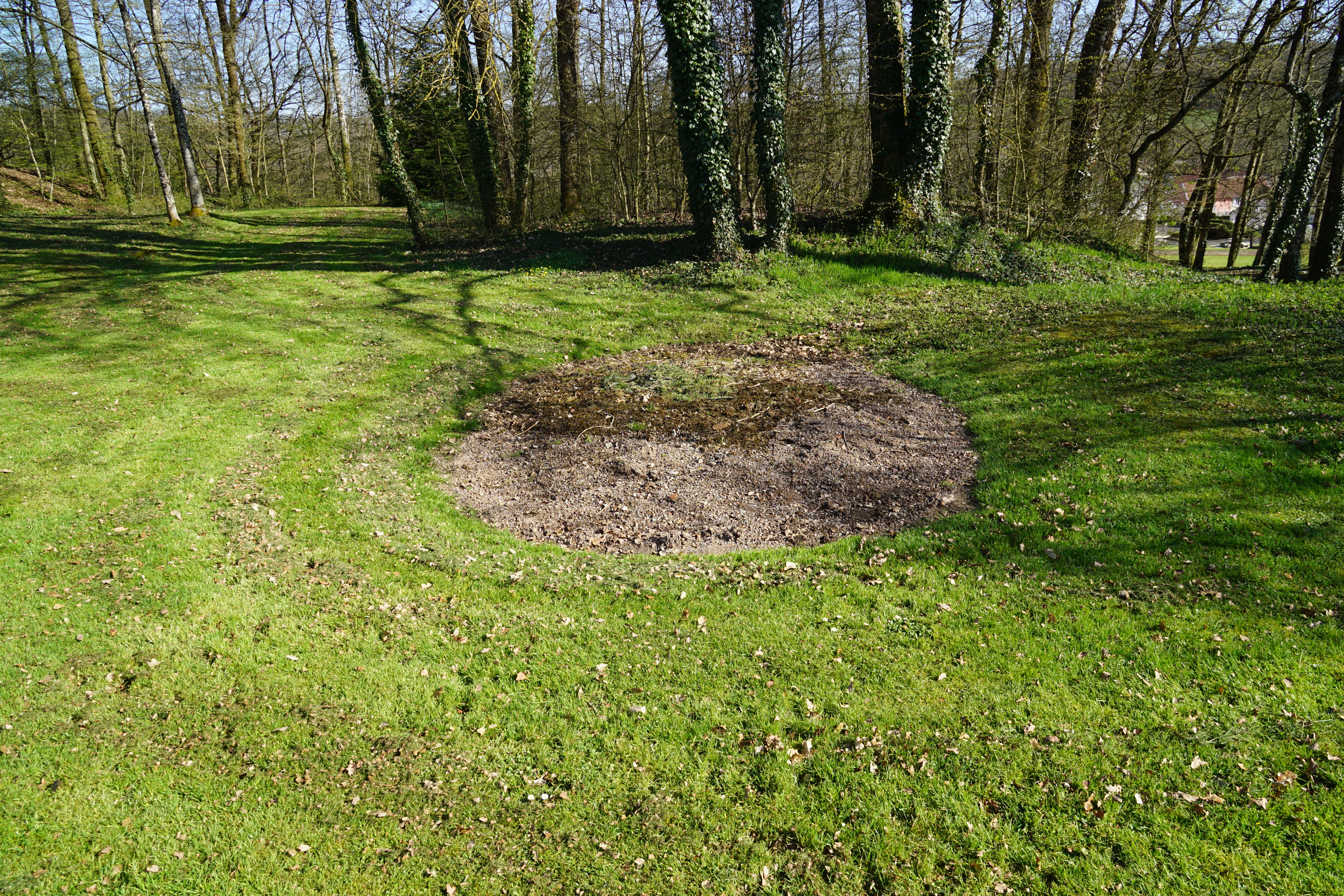
Shaft location.

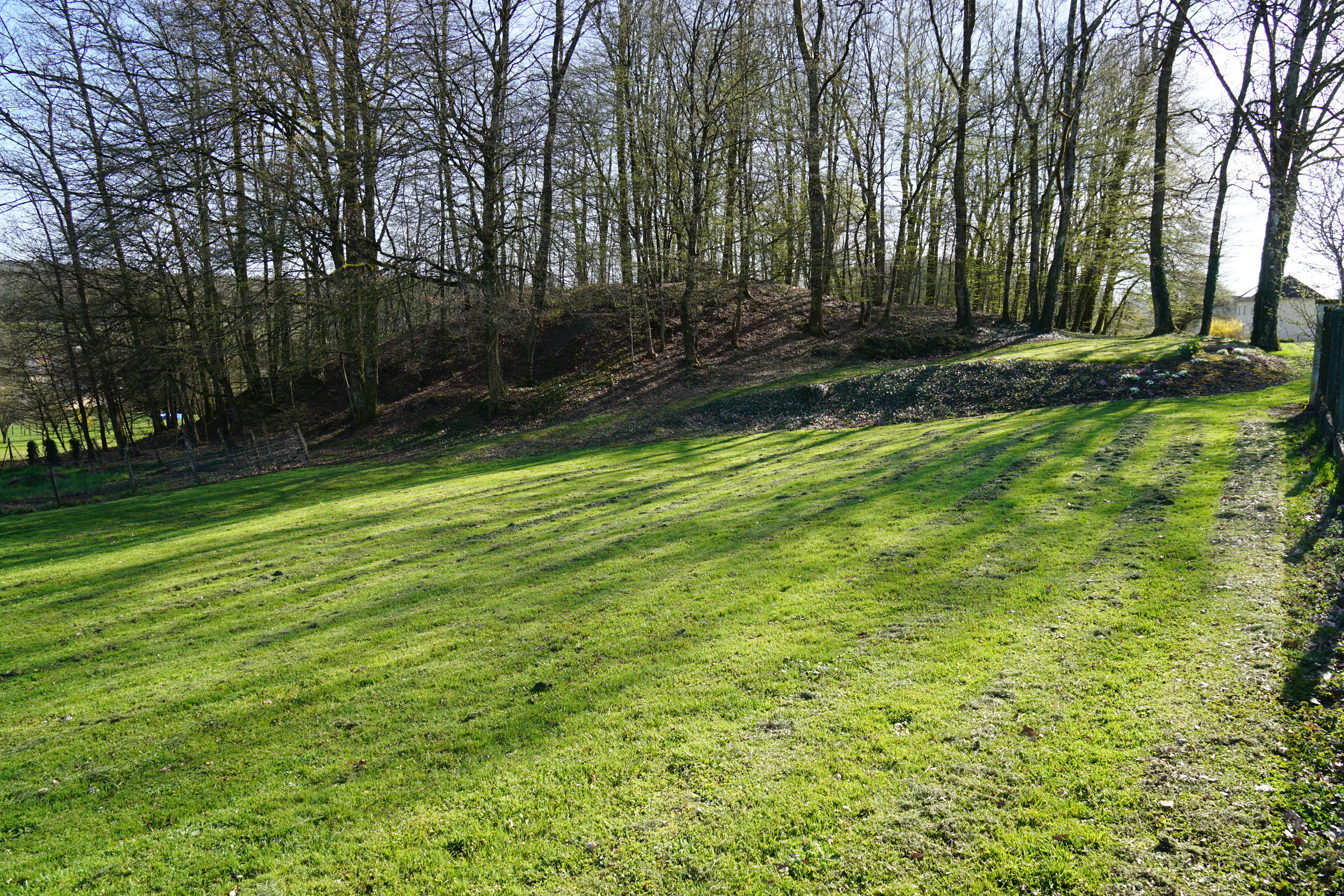
The spoil heap.

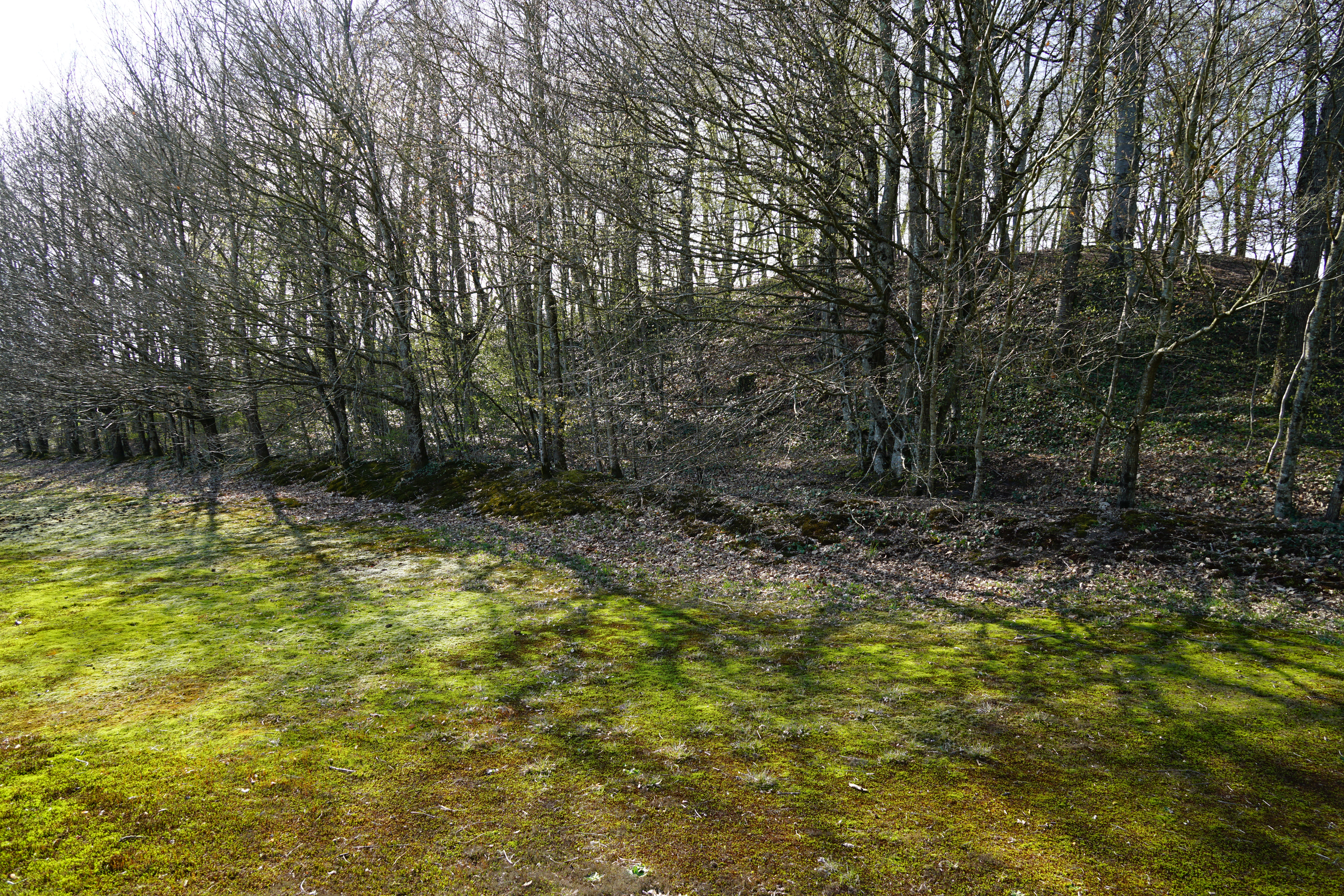

=== Shaft No. 14 ===
47°35′41″N 6°28′29″E

In October 1879, the workforce at well no. 11 made an unexpected discovery: borehole No. 15. The location was designated as the hooking chamber for the future shaft No. 14. This shaft was constructed from the bottom up, following the trajectory of the borehole. The sole shaft within the concession was not dug from the surface. The rectangular section of the shaft measures 3.68 meters by 1.52 meters and is reinforced with timber frames. The shaft is divided into four compartments: one for ladders for workers' descent, one for ventilation, and another for extraction. The sinking of the shaft was completed in March 1880. At approximately 48 meters deep, it serves for ventilation and access to the works of shaft No. 11. In 1882, shaft No. 11 exploited high-quality coal in the sector of shaft No. 14.

At the beginning of the 21st century, a large funnel remains at the site of the shaft, at the edge of the woods. Only a portion of the spoil heap remains.

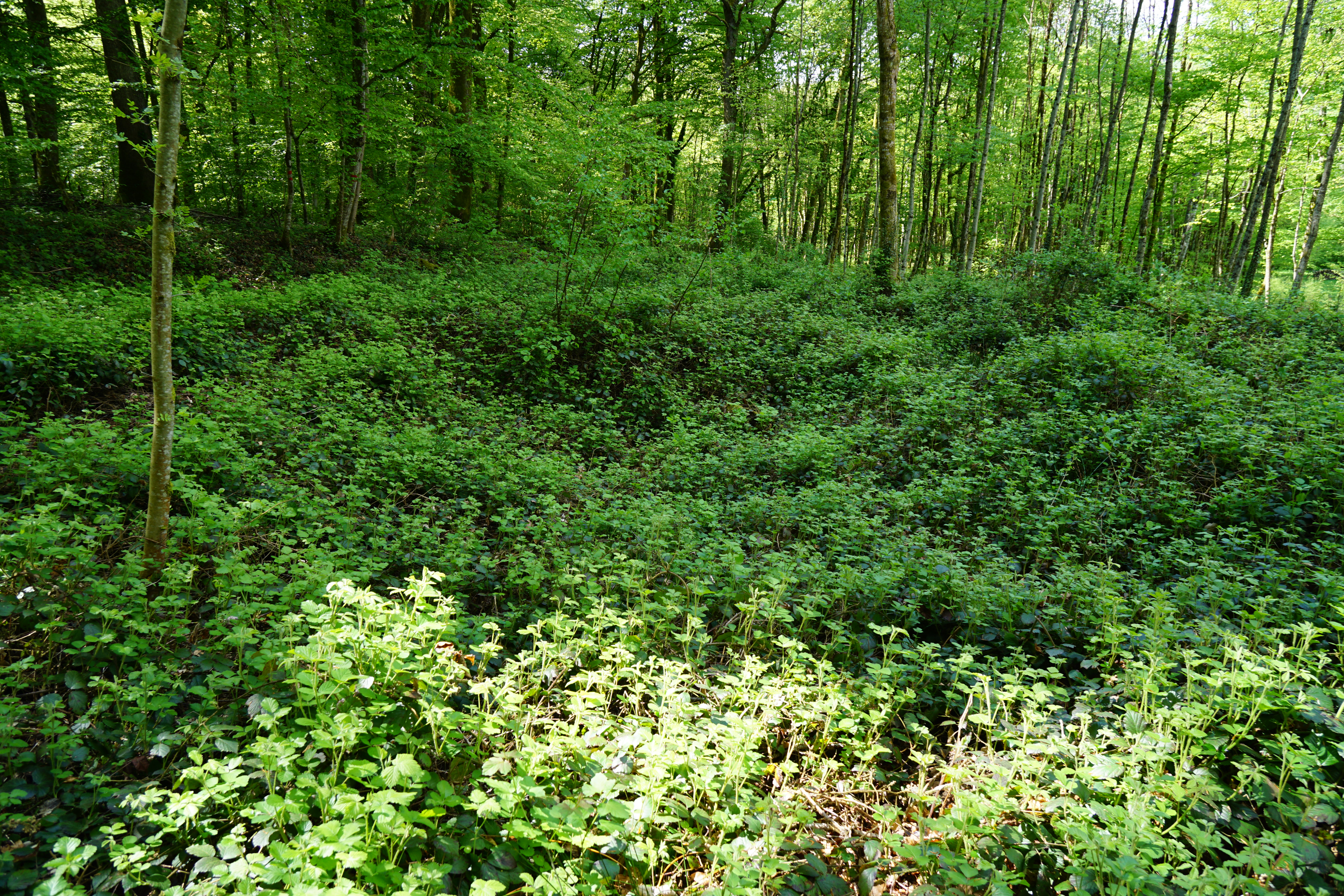
Shaft location.

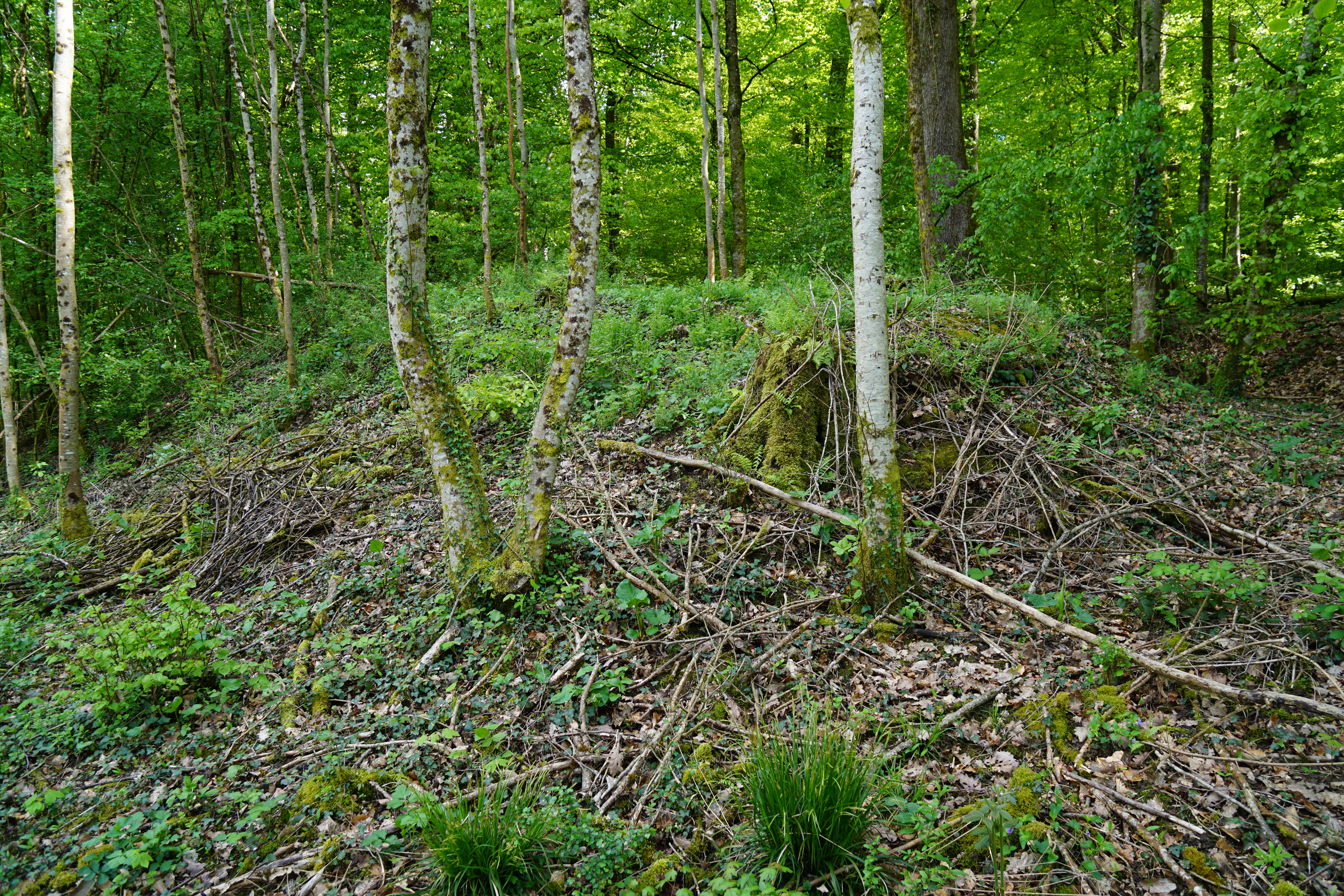
Spoil heap.

=== Shaft No. 15 ===
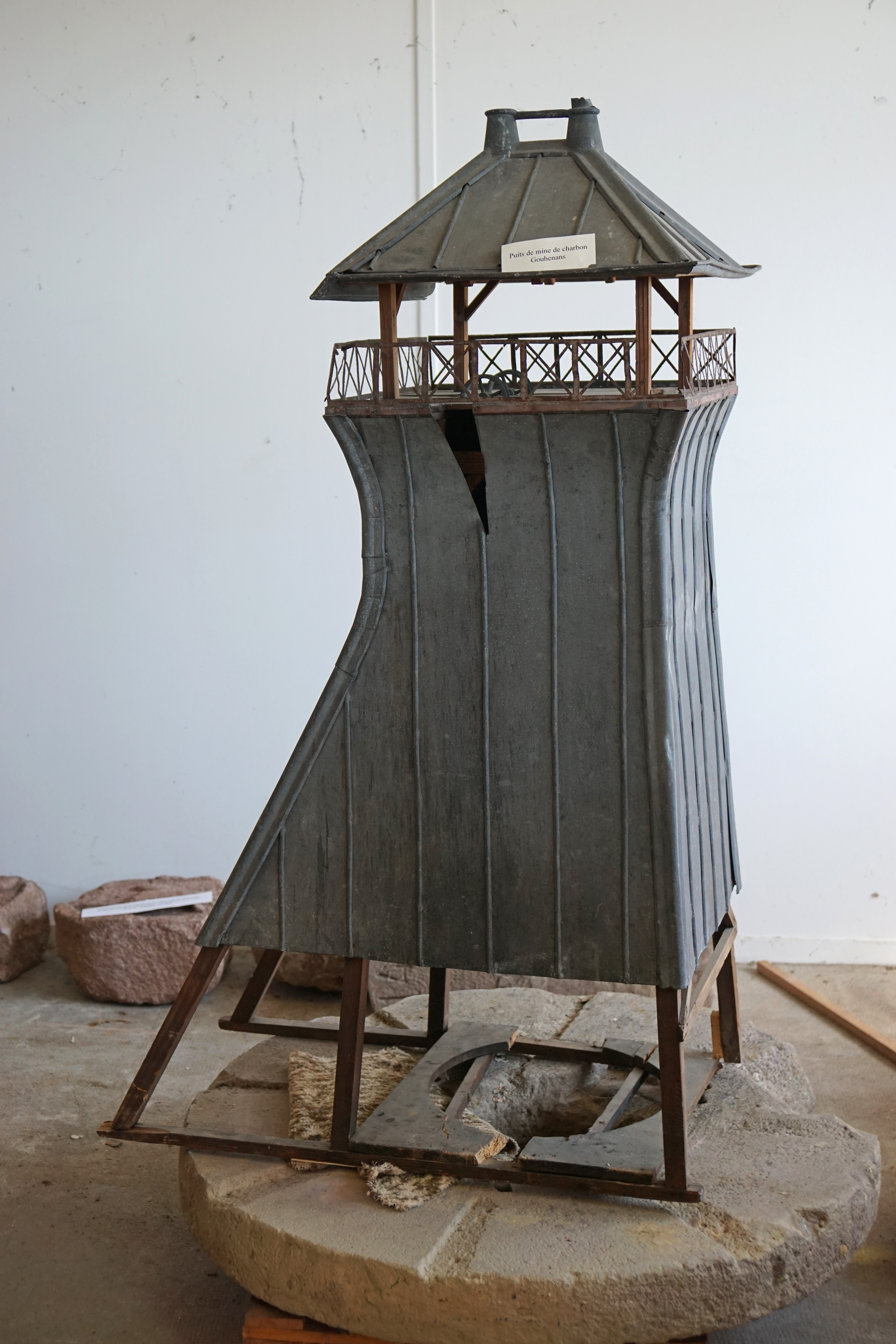
Model of the headframe.

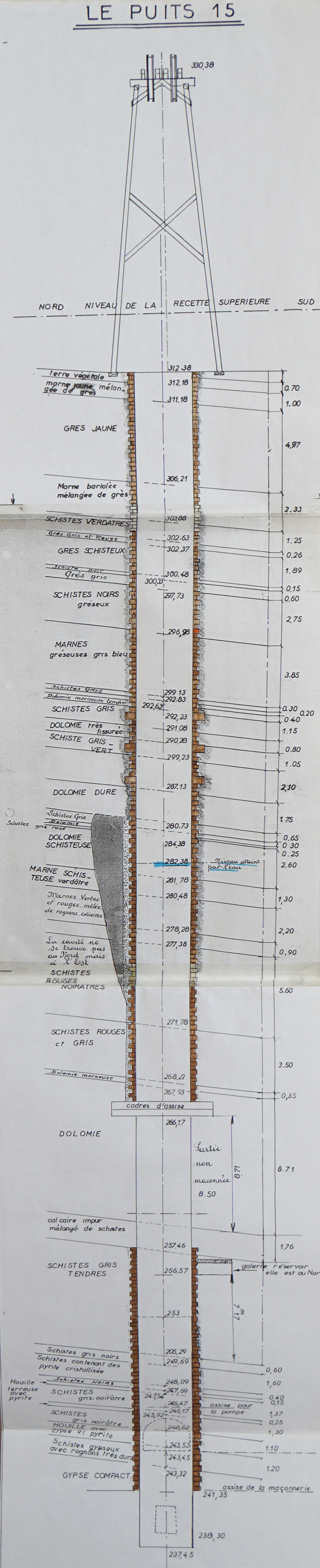
Cross-section of shaft.

47°35′20″N 6°28′37″E

Following the depletion of the deposit exploited by shaft No. 11, the board of directors resolved to commence excavation of shaft No. 15 on 18 March 1889. The sinking of the well commenced in September 1889 in the vicinity of shaft No. 11. The well is circular with a diameter of 3.5 meters and is lined with variegated sandstone blocks. This shaft is solely used for the extraction of minerals, with miners using shaft No. 11 to access the work sites. Additionally, this shaft serves as a ventilation source for the work sites. The shaft reached a depth of 68 meters and commenced operation in 1893, encountering coal at that depth.

The shaft is exploited by caving, with coal extracted from right to left along the galleries. Then, the coal is transported on the surface by a motorized inclined plane to shaft No. 11, and subsequently by rail to the saline. Additionally, dewatering water is conveyed to shaft No. 11 via cast iron pipes after being decanted.

The surface installations include a wooden headframe with a pulley axis of 18 meters, the restored steam engine from shaft No. 4 (with extraction drum and pumps), boilers, and a brick chimney. The total cost of establishing the shaft was 101,608.30 francs. In 1899, the shaft experienced a water inflow of 750 m³ per day, resulting in its premature abandonment after six years of exploitation. The shaft has a total depth of 70.56 meters.

At the beginning of the 21st century, the location of the shaft is marked by the remaining opening and spoil heap. The shaft No. 15 site has been developed and integrated into the walking circuit titled "Between Salt and Coal", (Note: "Entre Sel et Charbon". visorando.com (in French). 28 November 2013. Archived from the original on 6 May 2024.) (Note: The well-needed clarification with well no 11 during its renovation.) which was later renamed "The Way of Salt and Coal." (Note: "Sentier de randonnée : la Voie du Sel et du Charbon". Tourist office of the Pays de Villersexel community of communes. (in French). Archived from the original on 28 September 2022.)

Charles Semonin constructed a model of the shaft's headframe, which is currently housed at SHAARL, the Historical and Archaeological Society of the Arrondissement of Lure.

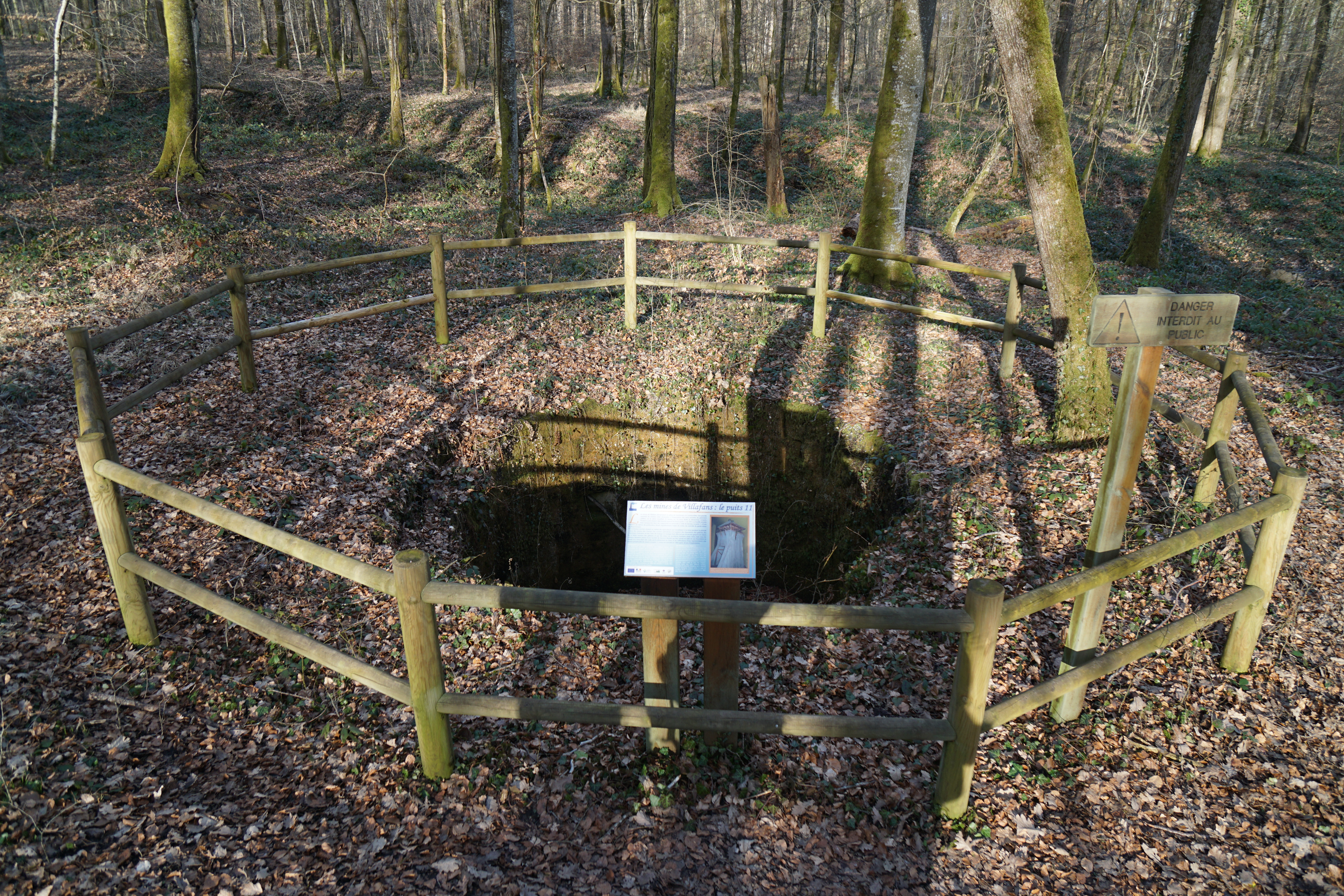
The former shaft No. 15 has been refurbished.

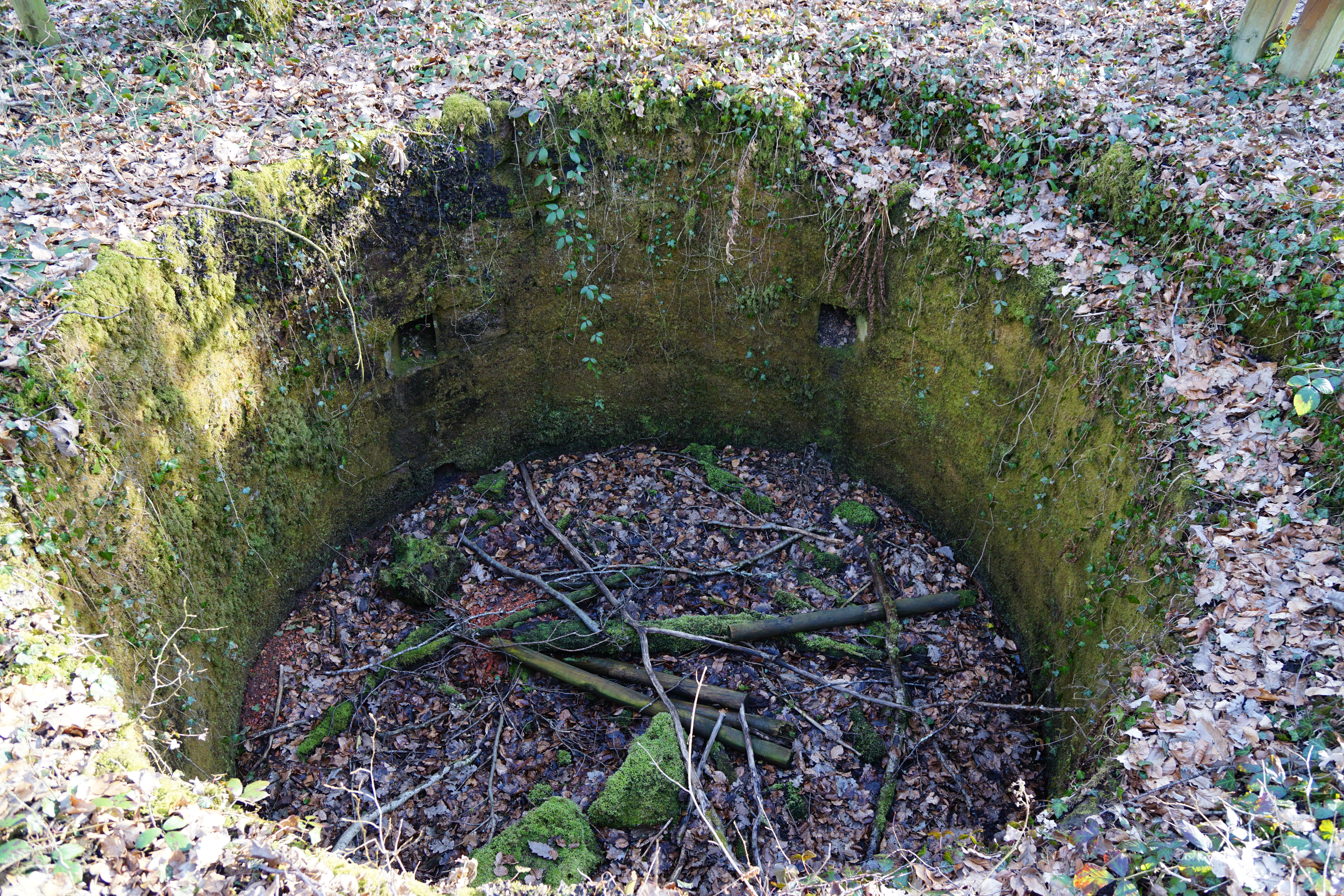
Detail of the masonry hole.

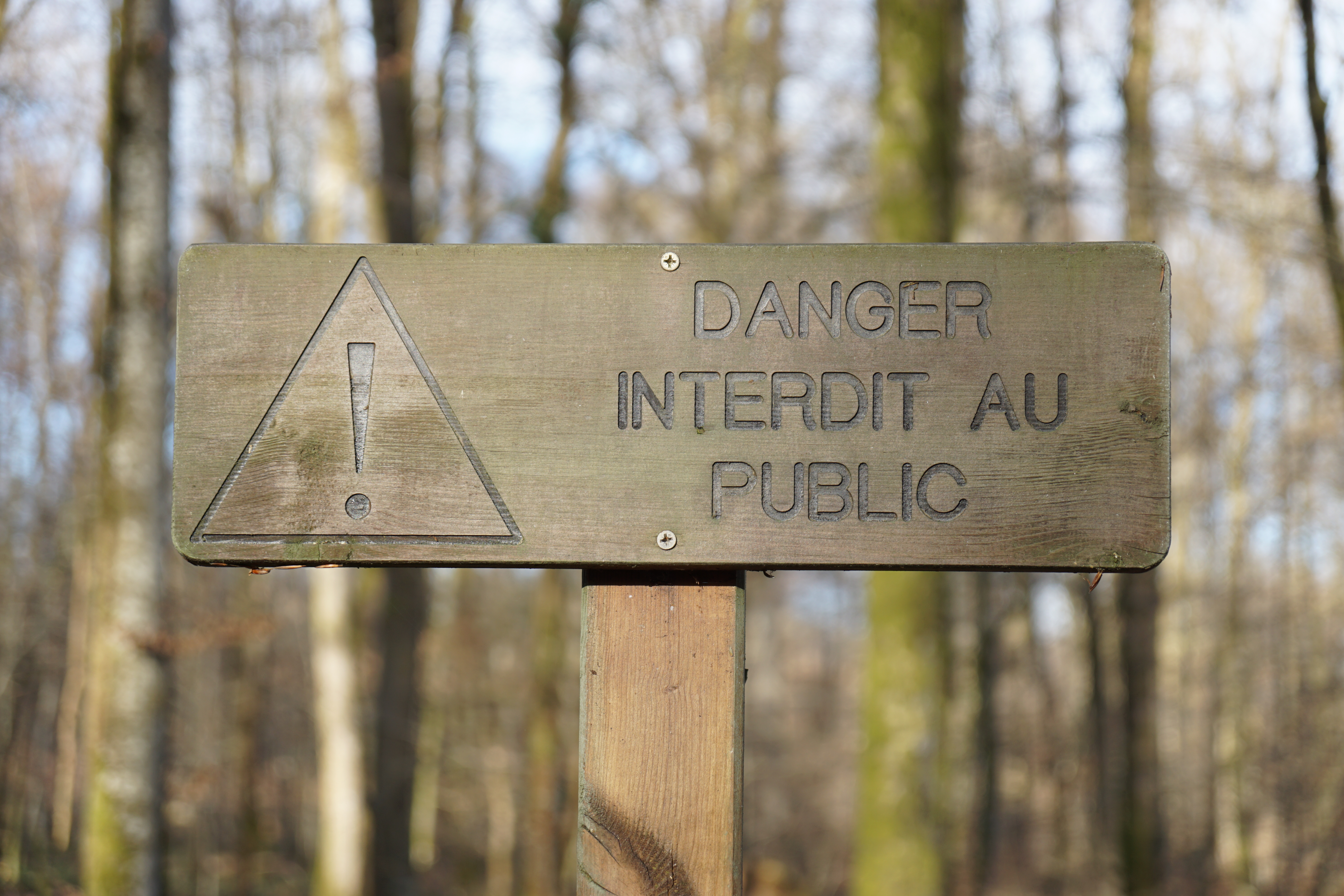
Danger sign.

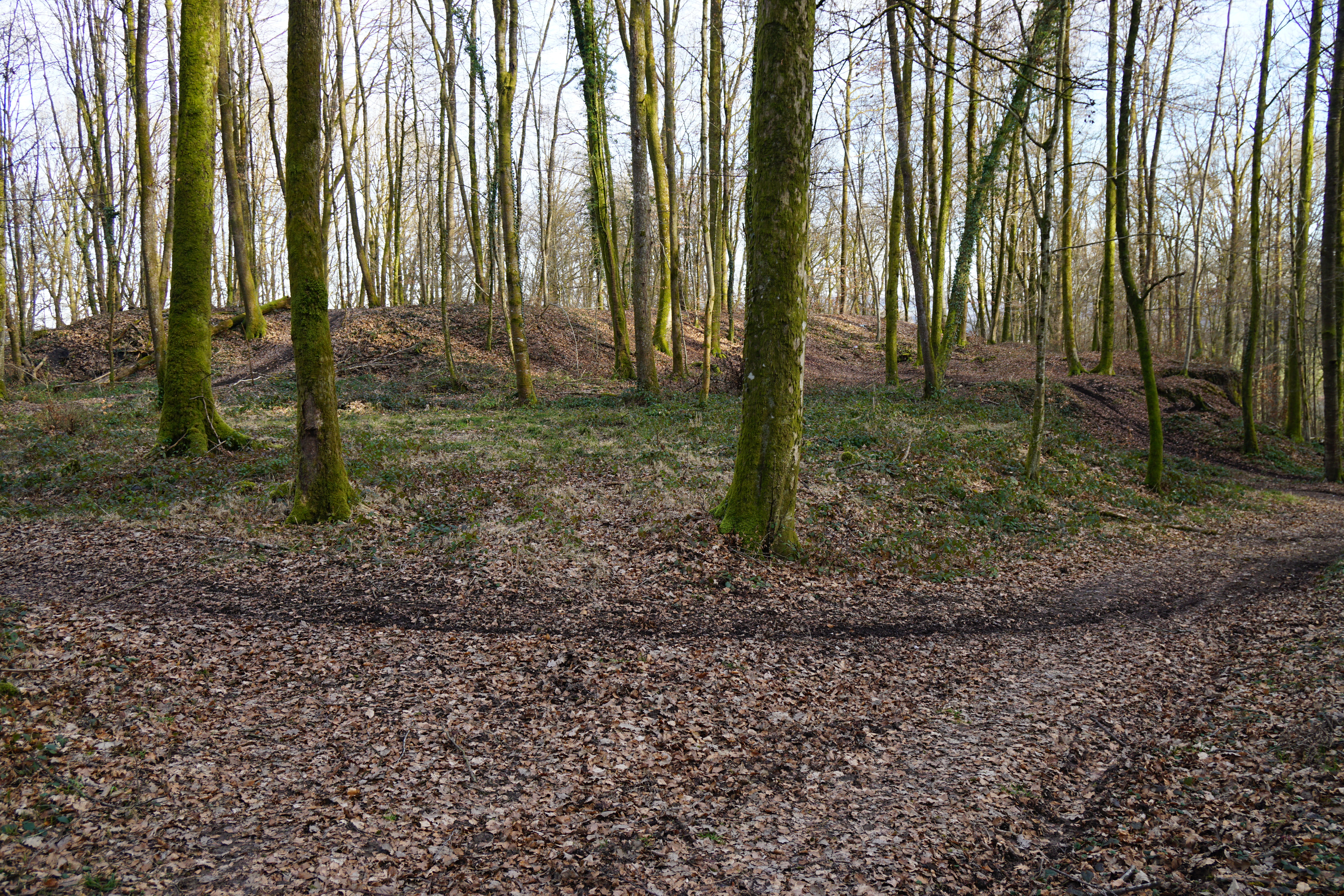
General view of the spoil heap.

=== Shaft No. 16 ===
47°35′55″N 6°29′35″E

Shaft No. 16, designated "Échalais well", was excavated between 13 January 1897, and 16 April of the following year. It was used until 1898, after which it was inundated by substantial water inflows. Its depth is 41.63 meters.

In the early 21st century, a spoil heap and a funnel remain at the shaft site, situated on the periphery of a minor road.

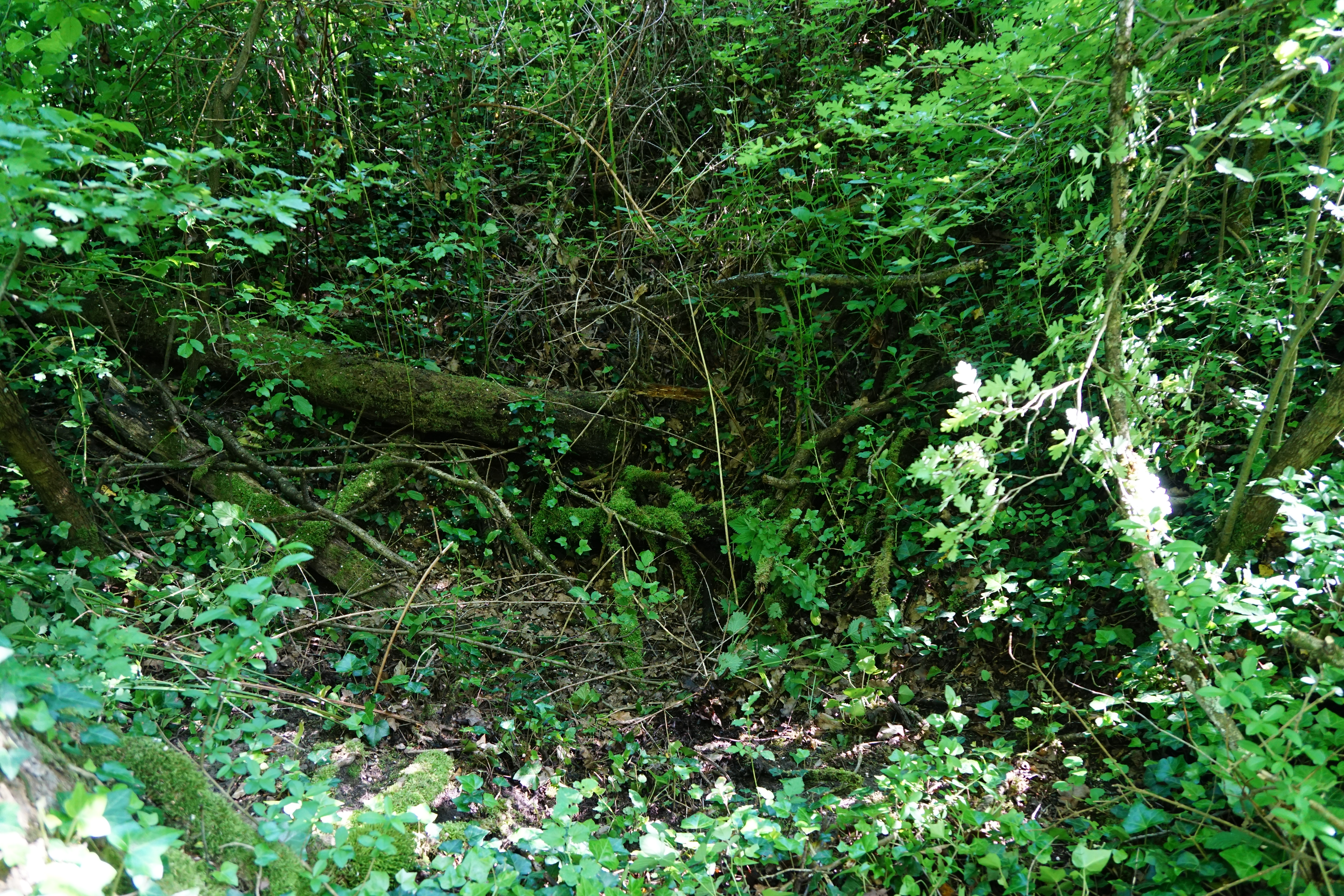
Shaft location.

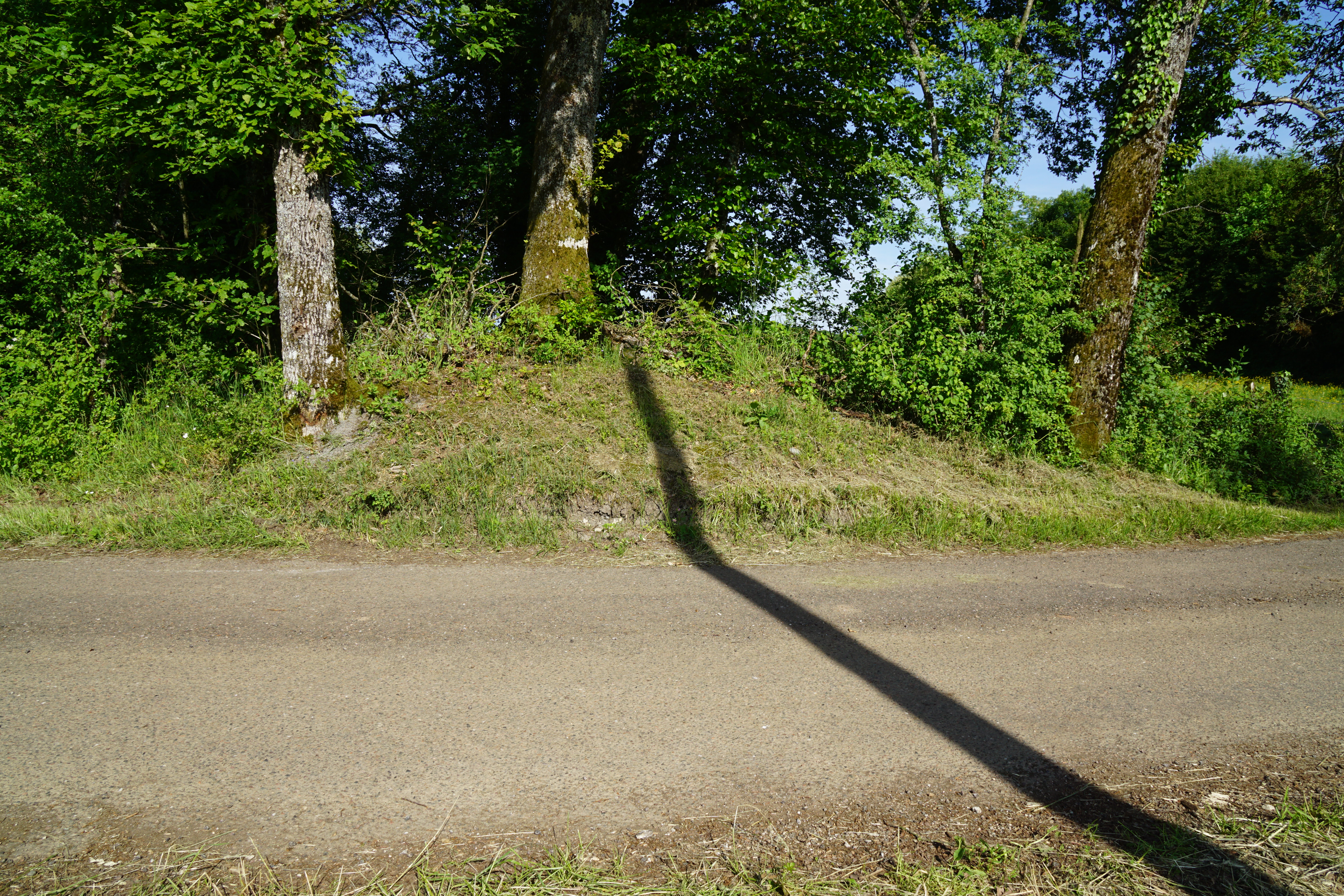
Spoil heap.

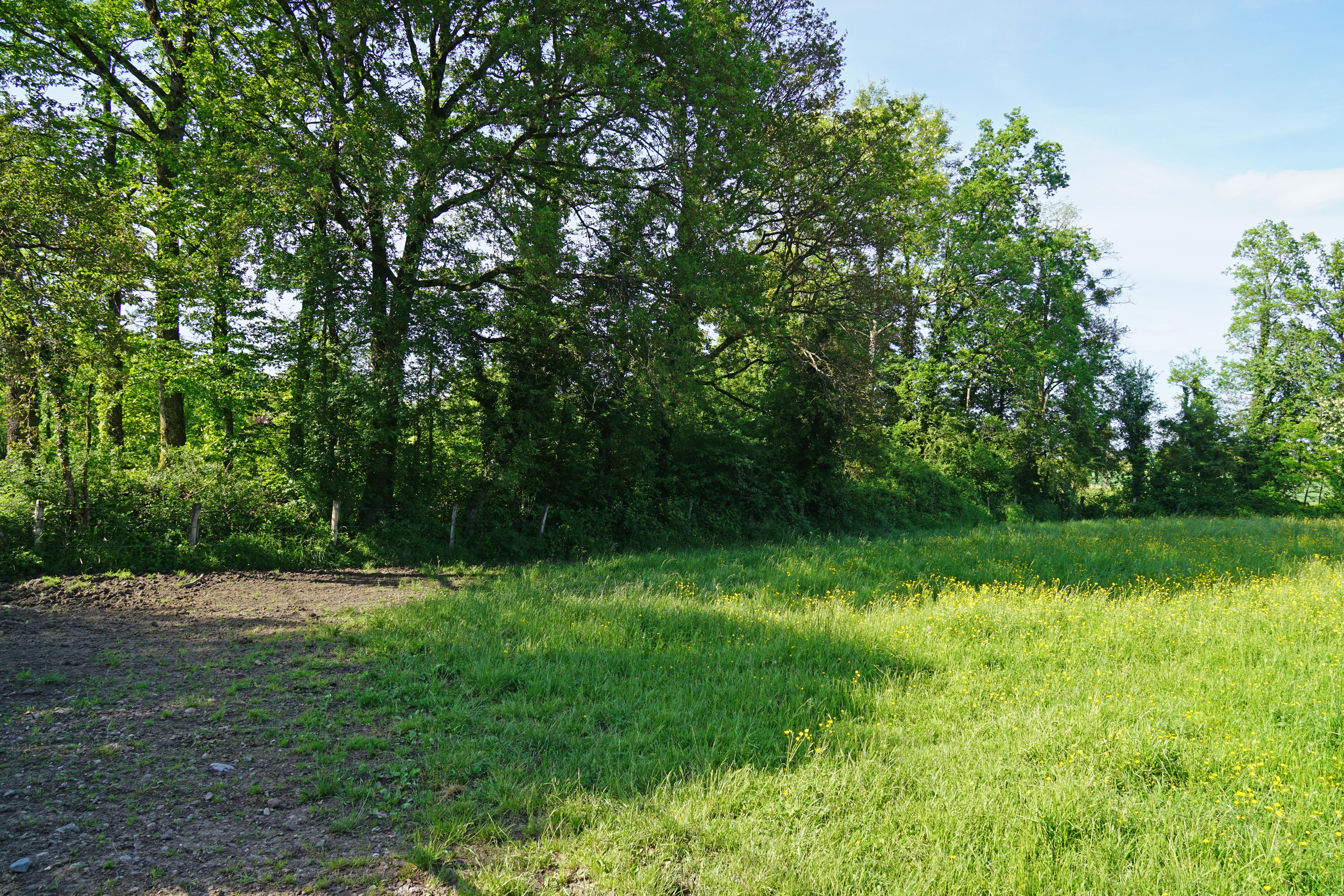

=== Shaft No. 17 ===
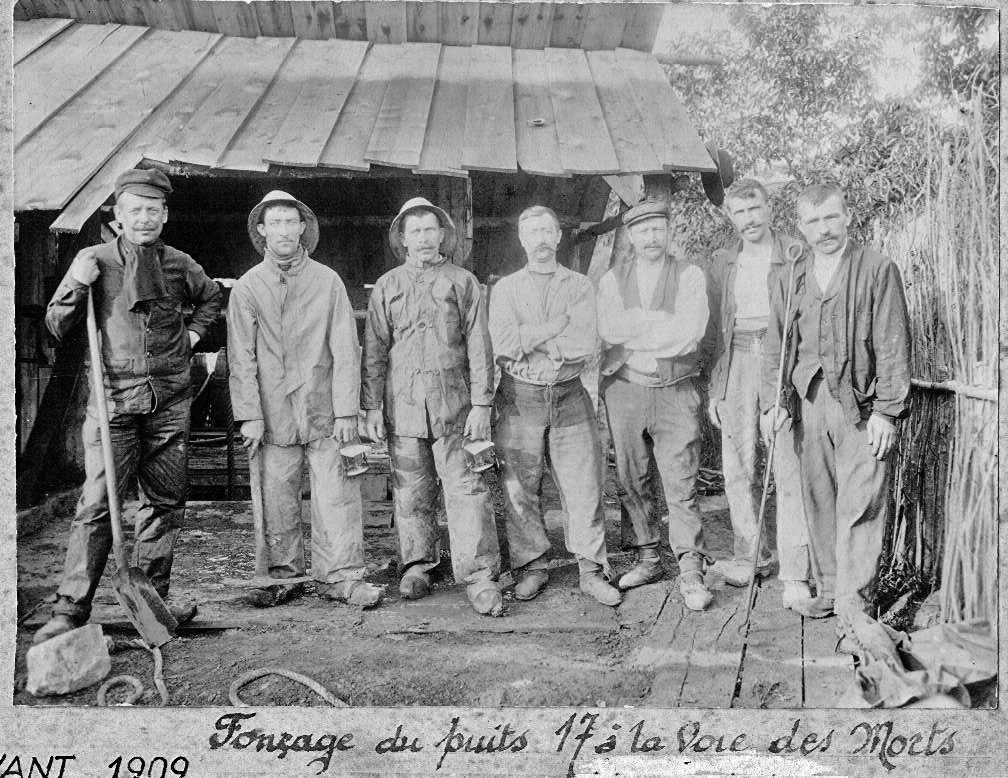
Shaft sinking team.

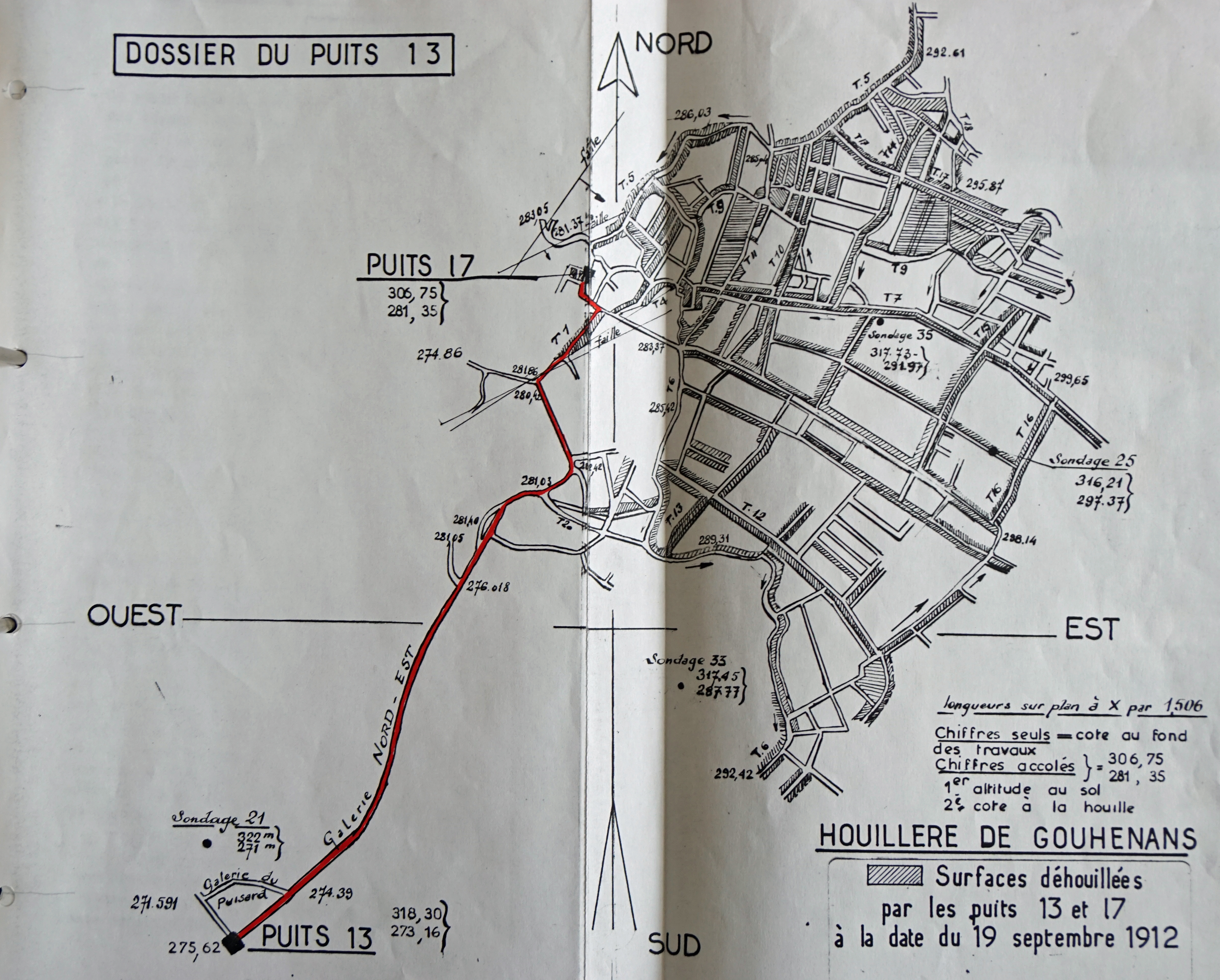
Work on shaft No. 17 and the link with No. 13.

47°35′25″N 6°28′44″E

Exploitation resumed in 1906 in two distinct sectors: a descent shaft and Well No. 17, sunk at Chambrevin in May 1908.

The research project commenced in 1909. Two galleries excavated to the northeast and southeast successfully identified the layer, which exhibited a thickness range of 60 to 90 centimeters. The shaft was used for a brief period for exploitation, yielding 10 tons of coal per day, before the installation and activation of shaft No. 13. Additionally, two tons of debris were removed daily. The debris was subsequently deposited on the opposite side of the Époisses road. In a location opposite the shaft, a further lengthy spoil heap was constructed in advance of the railway line, situated along the route of the path. A pump driven by a locomotive was used to contain the water inflow at a rate of 3 m^{3}/h. Approximately fifteen individuals were engaged in the coal mining operation. Eight miners, one hauler, four receivers at the base, and two machinists on the surface were employed. The depth of the well, exclusive of the bilge, is 26 meters. The shaft has a rectangular cross-section of 2 meters by 1 meter and is divided into two compartments: one for ladders with landings and the other for extraction. A steam winch is employed to operate the lift. Two small suction fans were utilized for ventilation purposes; however, in July 1909, a more powerful fan was installed as a replacement. The landing area on the surface is designed and constructed in a manner that ensures protection from the elements. A multitude of galleries excavated within a 30-meter radius of the lower landing had to be filled in, as they posed a threat to the well's structural integrity. The aforementioned works were connected to shaft No. 13 by the end of 1911, thereby facilitating ventilation. In that same year, the well employed a total of 26 workers, including 12 miners and 4 haulers. The 400 tons extracted per month were entirely consumed by the saline. In 1912, well No. 13 became the extraction well, while shaft No. 17 served for worker descent (being less deep and closer to the worksites). An electric transformer was installed on the site. In 1913, a layer with a thickness varying from 0.7 to 1 meter was identified west of the well by research conducted in a descent shaft.

The well was the final one to be decommissioned in 1921. The buildings were demolished, and the well was backfilled between 1924 and 1925 by Mr. May. Only the wooden transformer building remained intact. The structure was struck by lightning in the summer of 1928, resulting in its destruction by fire. In 1993, it was confirmed that the galleries dug east of the well, under houses constructed throughout the 20th century, did not present subsidence risks as a thick layer of limestone covered them.

At the beginning of the 21st century, the two spoil heaps, one reworked and the other overgrown, remain in situ. The well site is located at the corner of a private property.

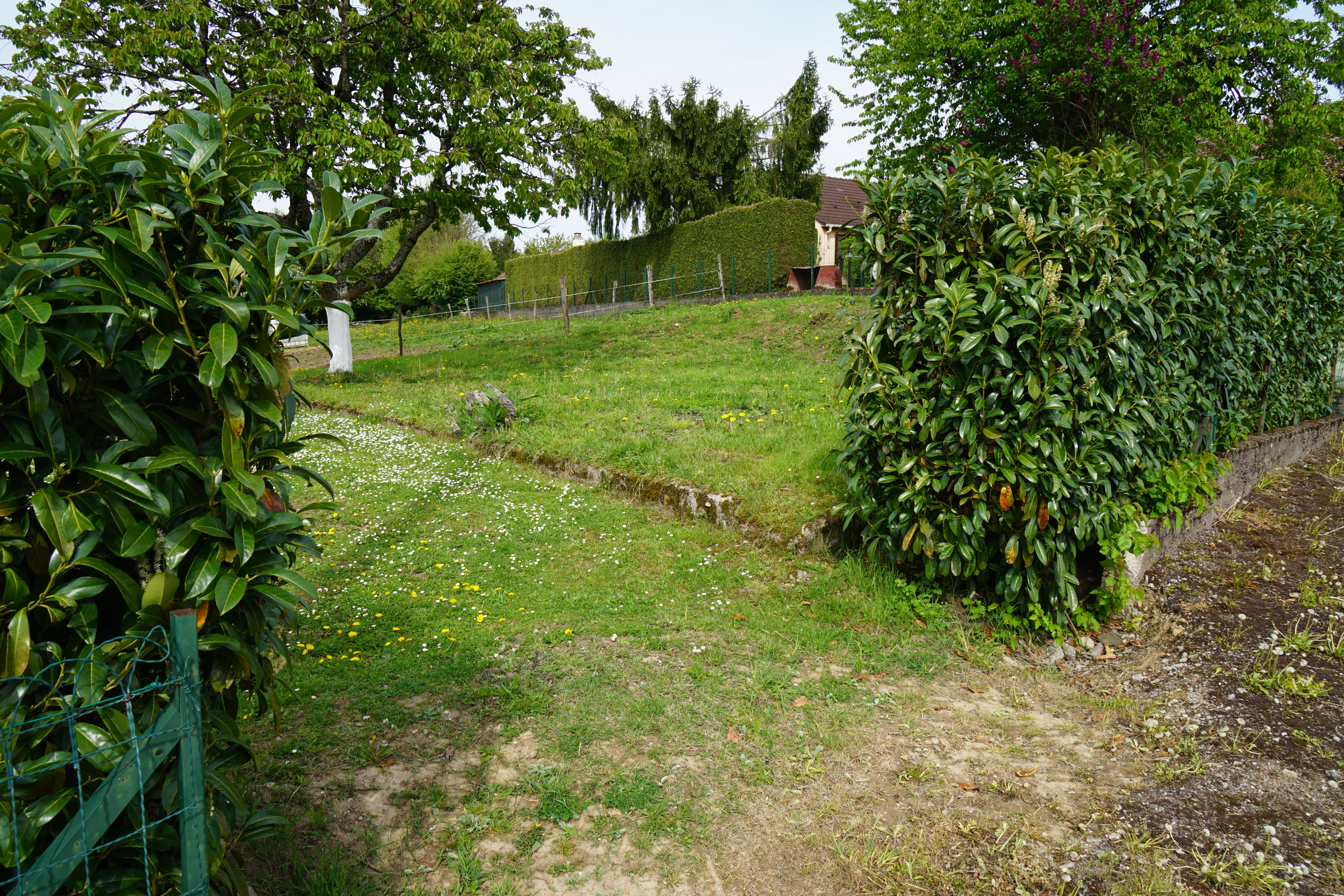
Shaft location.

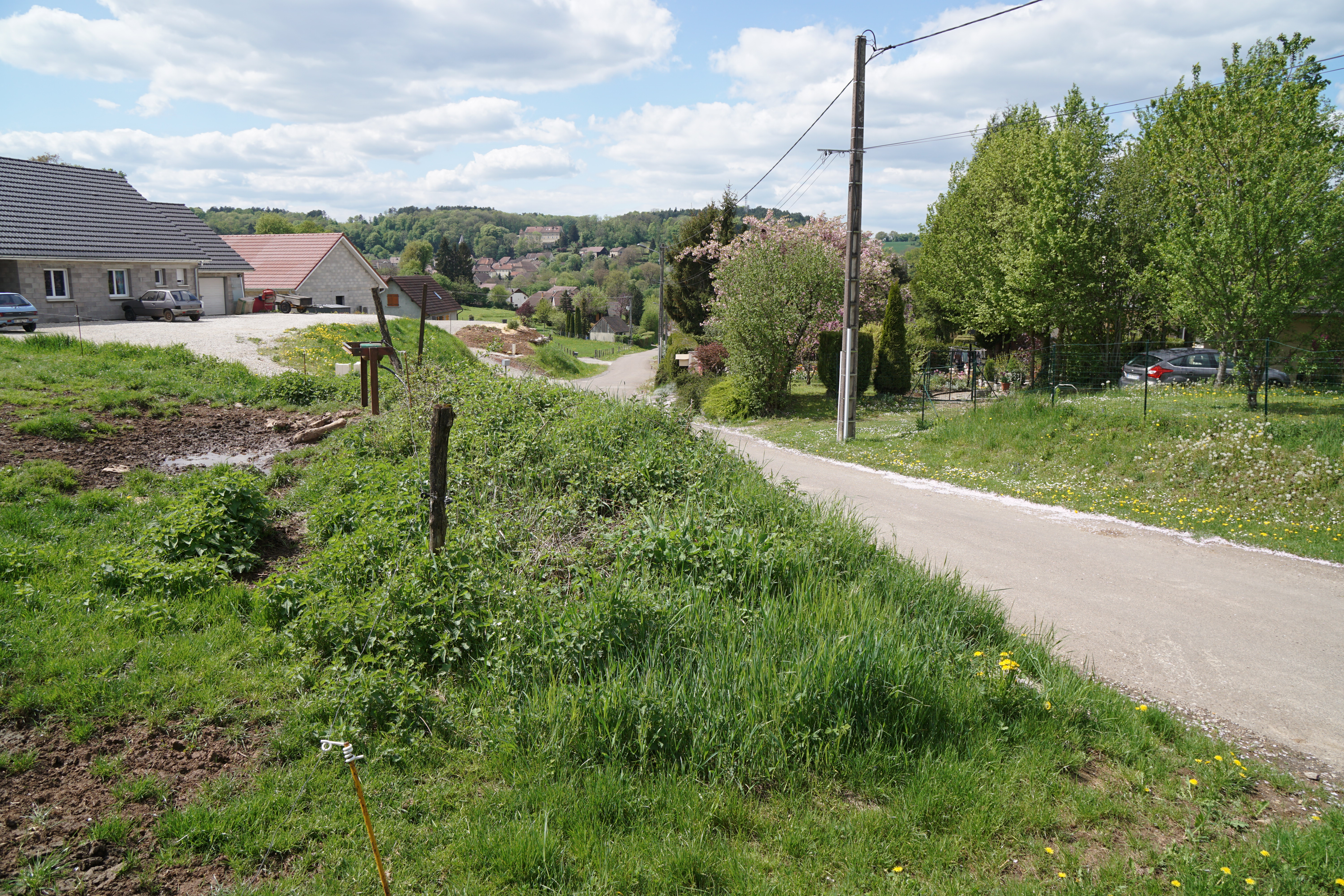
Reworked main spoil heap, now a residential area.

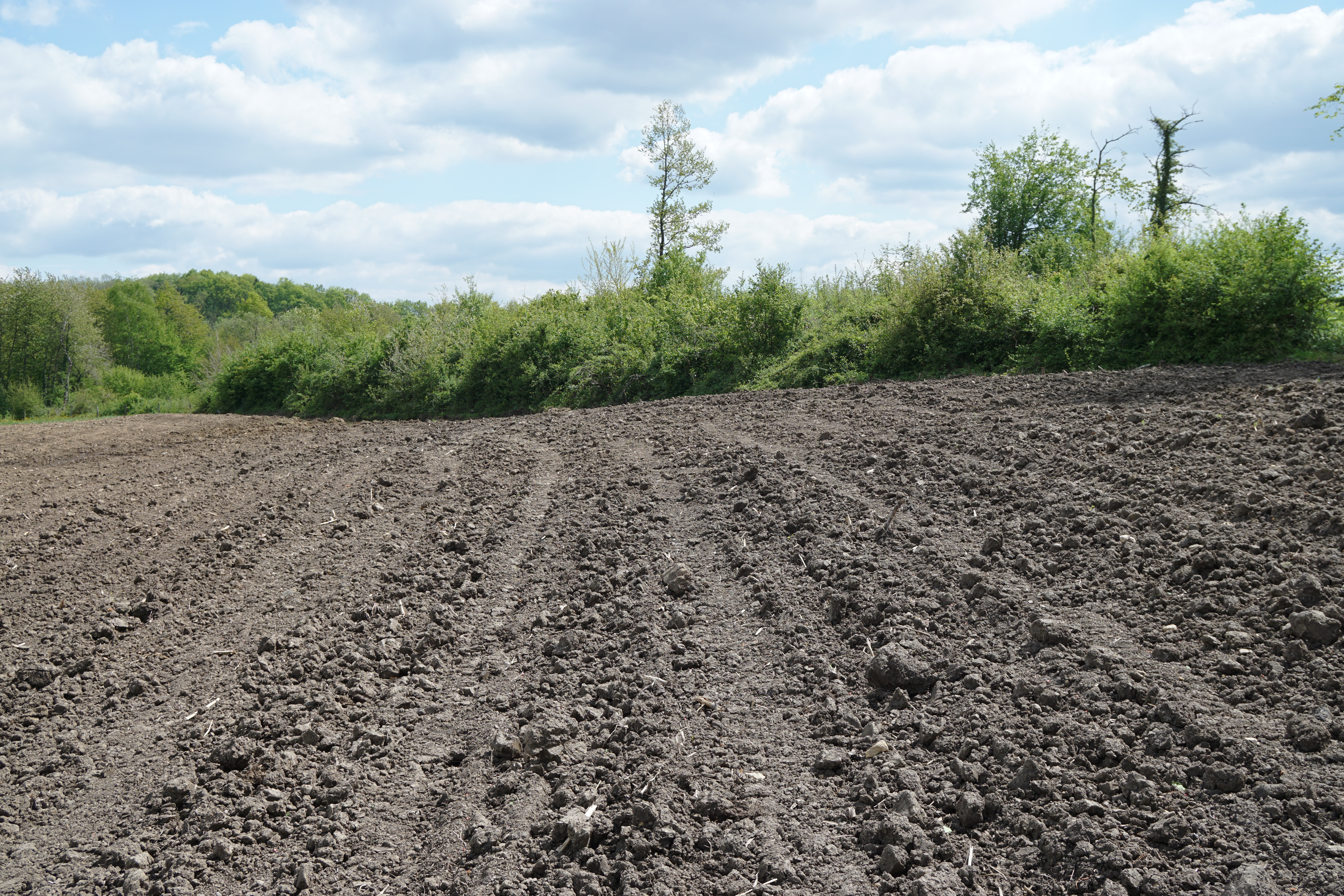
Secondary spoil heap.

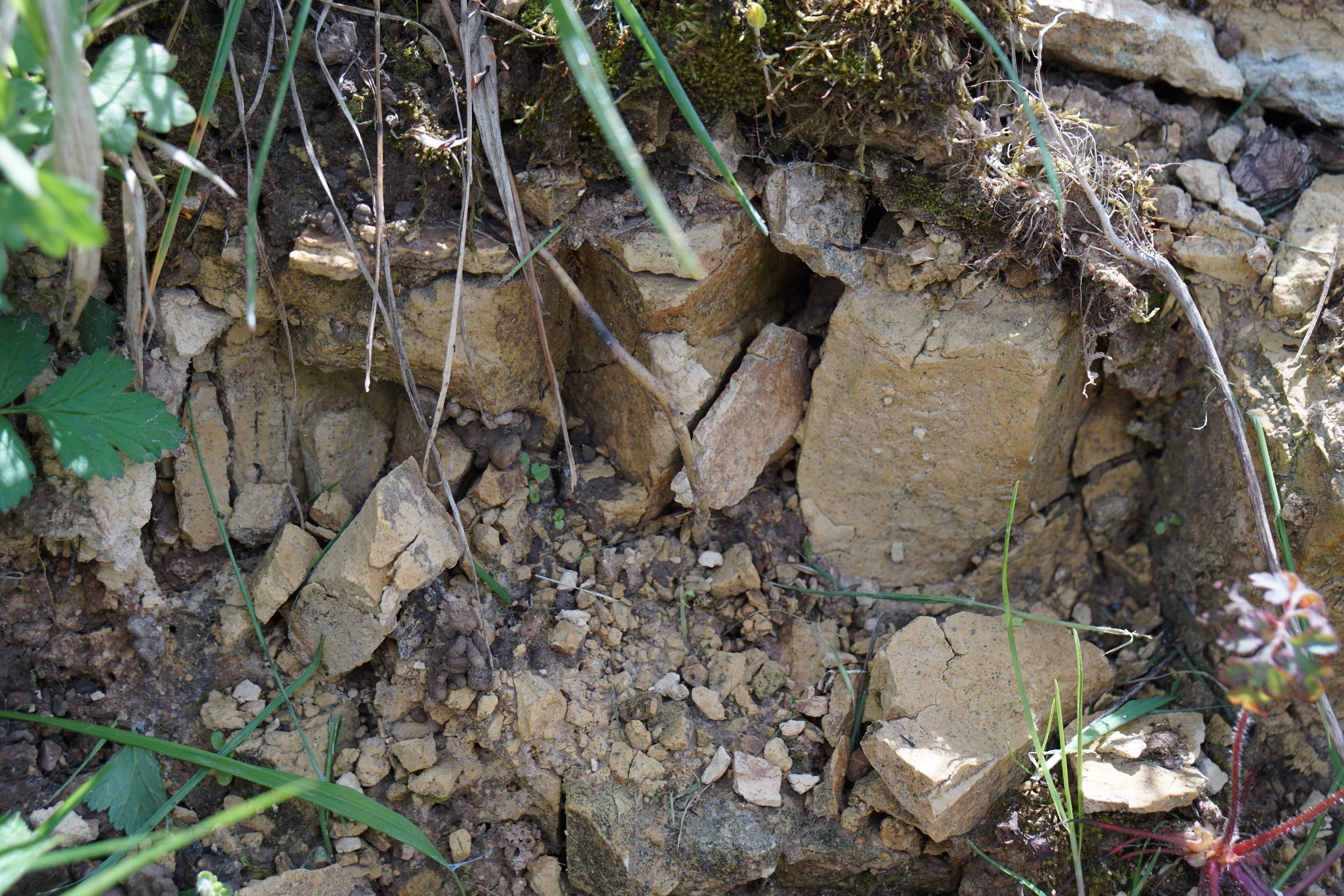
Spoil heap rock.

== Production ==
Use of coal extracted from the various concessions by the saltworks.

Evolution of coal mining in the Gémonval basin (including Saulnot and Gouhenans).
| | 1911 | 1912 | 1913 | 1914 | 1915 | 1916 | 1917 | 1918 | 1919 | 1920 | 1921 |
|---|---|---|---|---|---|---|---|---|---|---|---|
| Production (approximate) in thousands of tonnes | 5.7 | 6.5 | 7.5 | 8.75 | 6 | 3.1 | 9.5 | 10.6 | 5.2 | 3.9 | 0.95 |

== Social aspects ==
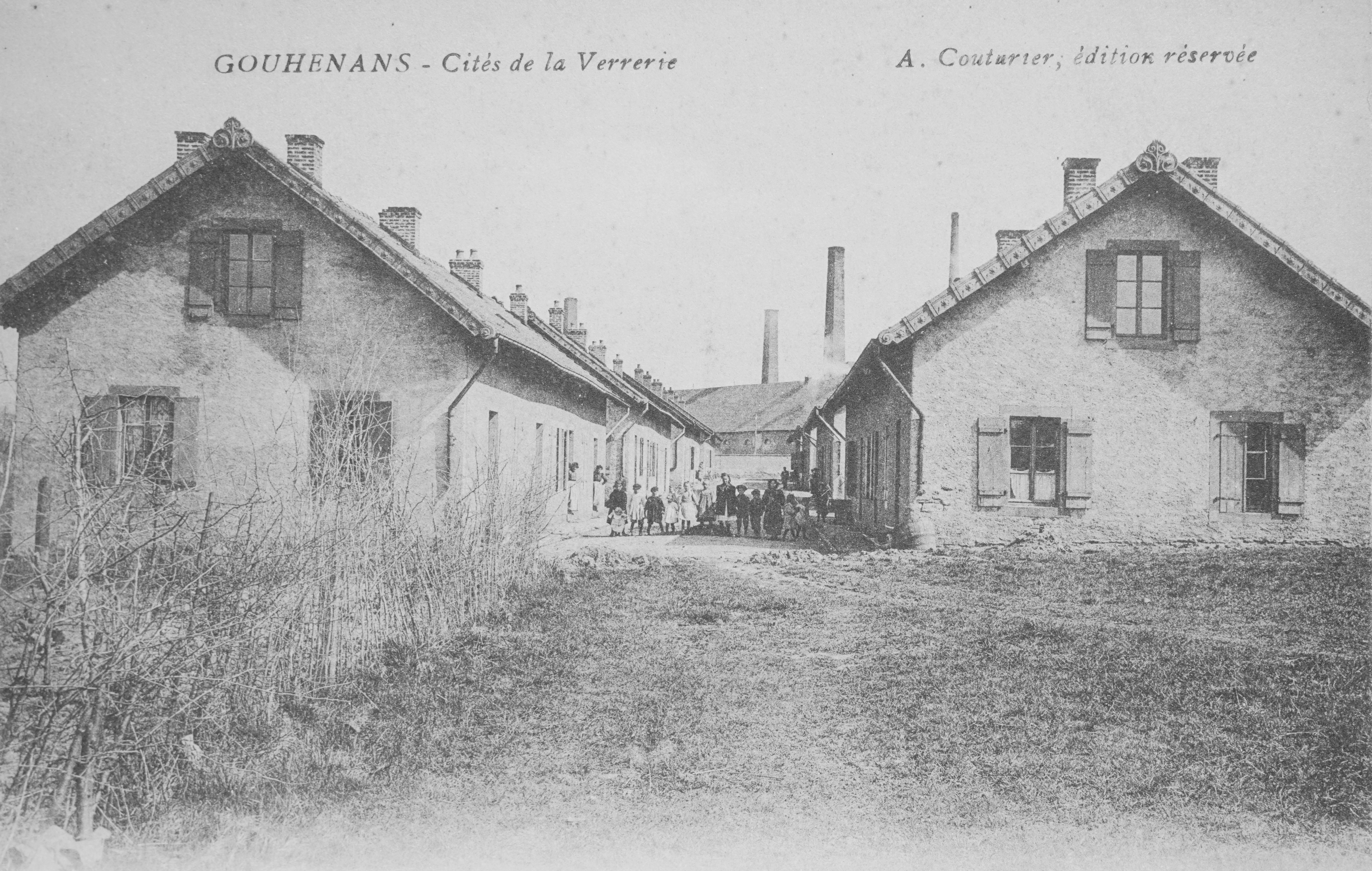
The glassworks housing estate.

=== Housing ===
The workers' company town, colloquially known as the "glass factory estate", was constructed at the outset of the 20th century. It comprises eight semi-detached dwellings. In 1912, the saline's workforce was approximately fifty individuals.

=== Personnel ===
In the mid-19th century, the saline operation was conducted on a 24-hour basis, including Sundays and holidays.

In 1865, the saline and chemical plant combined employed a total of 132 individuals, in addition to 80 personnel engaged in coal mining. By 1875, the workforce comprised 242 male employees, five female employees, and 30 children.

=== Salaries ===
Daily wages of coal mine employees in 1834:
| Trade(s) | Amount |
|---|---|
| Miner | 40/45 centimes |
| Small hauler | 28/30 centimes |
| Large hauler | 12 centimes/quintal |
| Pumper | 44 francs/month |

A "small hauler" operated small primitive wooden minecart, which were colloquially referred to as "mine dogs." Mounted on iron-shod wooden rollers, their capacity was 125 kg. At the exit of the work site, the materials were transferred into 250 kg carts, which were then transported to the landing by the "large haulers." Finally, the materials were brought to the surface.

=== Accidents ===
The Gouhenans coal mines did not experience significant disasters such as firedamp explosions. However, there were several instances of individual accidents, often localized collapses, which resulted in injuries or fatalities among miners.

In 1838, former miners injured in work accidents received a daily retirement of 75 centimes.

== See also ==
- Gouhenans
- Villafans
- Salt mining

== Bibliography ==
- Suchaux, L (1866). La Haute-Saône : dictionnaire historique, topographique et statistique des communes du département (in French). Archived from the original on 18 July 2024.
- Thirria, Édouard (1869). Manuel à l'usage de l'habitant du département de la Haute-Saône (in French). pp. 182–186. Archived from the original on 11 April 2022.
- Dormois, R; Ricours, J (1943). Houille triasique sur le versant N.O. du Jura (PDF) (in French). BRGM. Archived from the original on 20 December 2022.
- Bonte, A (1939). Rapport sur la structure de la partie occidentale de la concession de sel de Gouhenans (Haute-Saône) (PDF) (in French). BRGM. Archived from the original (PDF) on 11 April 2022.
- Ricours, J (1944). Travaux pour recherche pour exploitation de houilles et de sel gemme triasiques dans les concessions de Gouhenans et des Époisses (Haute-Saône) (in French). BRGM.
- Daessle, M (1990). Amélioration du confinement du dépôt de résidus de fabrication de Lindane de Gouhenans, Haute-Saône : Définition des travaux (PDF) (in French). BRGM. Archived from the original (PDF) on 11 April 2022.
- Semonin, Pierre (1993a). Le gîte houiller de Villafans (in French).
- Semonin, Pierre (1993b). Houillère de Gouhenans : Les puits 1-5-6 (1828–1839), le puits 4 (1839–1864) (in French).
- Semonin, Pierre (1993c). Houillère de Gouhenans : Le puits 10 (1863–1873) (in French).
- Semonin, Pierre (1993d). Houillère de Gouhenans : Le puits 11 (1873–1893) (in French).
- Semonin, Pierre (1993e). Houillère de Gouhenans : Le puits 13 (1873–1893) (in French).
- Semonin, Pierre (1993f). Houillère de Gouhenans : Le puits 15, première partie (1889–1891) (in French).
- Semonin, Pierre (1993g). Houillère de Gouhenans : Le puits 17 (190?–1916) (in French).
- Semonin, Pierre (1993h). Usines de Gouhenans : La grande cheminée (in French). Archived from the original on 14 August 2018.
- BRGM (1998). Ancienne concession de houille de Vy-lès-Lure (70) : Etat des lieux (PDF) (in French). Archived from the original (PDF) on 18 July 2024.
- Benoit, Paul (1999). Le Charbon de Terre en Europe Occidentale Avant L'usage Industriel Du Coke (in French). Brepols. ISBN 978-2-503-50891-7. Archived from the original on 9 August 2022.
- Bregnard, Bregnard (2010). Les Vosges saônoises de A à Z (in French). Saint-Cyr-sur-Loire: Éditions Alan Sutton. ISBN 978-2-8138-0168-5.
- Debras, Sylvie (2013). Du sel dans nos ballades. En vadrouille (in French). Mille et un chemins. ISBN 979-10-90357-02-0. ISSN 2103-7361.
