= Crime in Louisiana =

According to the Louisiana Uniform Crime reporting program, there were 177,710 crimes reported in the U.S. state of Louisiana in 2018. The year 2018 had the fewest non-violent criminal offenses since at least 2008. Violent crime decreased from 2017 to 2018, but 2012 still remains the lowest with its record of 22,868. Rape went up 12.7% from 2017 while murder/non-negligent manslaughter declined 7.8%. Additionally, robbery dropped 15% and aggravated assault dropped 1.5%. Handguns remain the leading murder weapon with a rate of 44.7% with firearm (type unknown) following close behind at 35.7%. Together, these two contribute for 80.4% of the murders. Similarly, robberies were committed mostly with firearms in 2018. Firearms were leading with 52% and strongarm listed with a percentage of 35%.

== Homicide statistics ==
Louisiana experienced a higher murder and non-negligent manslaughter rate (8.7per 100,000) than any other U.S. state in 2025 for the 37th straight year (1989–2025), according to The 2025 FBI Uniform Crime Report, and it was also the first time since 1969 in which the state didn't experience a murder/nonnegligent manslaughter rate of 10 per 100,000 or more according to the Disaster Center's FBI figures. The average annual murder/nonnegligent manslaughter rate in Louisiana (13.6 per 100,000) is more than two times higher than the average annual rate in the U.S.(6.3 per 100,000) from 1989- 2024.

Louisiana murder rates per 100,000
Year	Murder rate	Year	Murder rate
1989	14.9	2007	14.7
1990	17.2	2008	12.3
1991	16.9	2009	11.8
1992	17.4	2010	11.2
1993	20.3	2011	11.2
1994	19.8	2012	10.6
1995	17.0	2013	10.8
1996	17.5	2014	10.2
1997	15.7	2015	10.3
1998	12.8	2016	11.8
1999	10.7	2017	12.4
2000	12.5	2018	11.4
2001	11.2	2019	11.7
2002	13.2	2020	15.8
2003	13.0	2021	19.6
2004	12.7	2022	16.1
2005	10.0	2023	14.5
2006	13.1	2024	10.8

== Crime statistics: 1995–2019 ==
Crime totals by offense in the state of Louisiana from 1995 through 2018 as recorded by the FBI's Uniform Crime Reports.

Numbers vary by year. Some reports list statistics for the previous year higher/lower than shown on said previous year's report.

Year	Population	Total	Violent	Property Crimes	Rape	Robbery	Aggravated assault	Burglary	Larceny Theft	Vehicle Theft
1994	4,342,000	289,873	43,741	246,132	1,855	11,662	29,484	53,481	166,667	n/a
1996	4,351,000	297,556	40,426	257,130	1,805	12,036	25,823	56,379	173,271	27,480
1997	4,352,000	280,671	37,248	243,423	1,799	10,407	24,360	53,935	163,114	26,374
1998	4,369,000	266,435	34,057	232,378	1,609	8,651	23,237	51,210	157,507	23,661
1999	4,372,000	251,252	32,033	219,219	1,448	7,591	22,526	47,775	149,749	21,695
2000	4,468,976	242,344	30,440	211,904	1,497	7,532	20,851	46,289	144,345	21,270
2001	4,465,430	238,371	30,678	207,693	1,404	7,864	20,910	46,451	139,555	21,687
2002	4,482,646	228,528	29,690	198,838	1,529	7,123	20,445	45,350	133,302	20,186
2003	4,493,665	222,320	28,622	193,698	1,601	7,008	19,429	44,572	129,471	19,655
2004	4,515,770	227,997	28,844	199,153	1,616	6,564	20,090	45,359	134,080	19,714
2005	4,523,628	193,500	26,889	166,611	1,421	5,337	19,681	39,382	112,840	14,389
2006	4,287,768	201,158	29,919	171,239	1,562	5,729	22,098	44,986	110,613	15,640
2007	4,293,204	206,308	31,317	174,991	1,393	6,083	23,233	44,602	115,209	15,180
2008	4,410,796	197,574	28,944	168,630	1,232	5,994	21,191	43,320	111,567	13,743
2009	4,492,076	198,305	27,849	170,456	1,359	6,105	19,855	46,246	112,493	11,717
2010	4,533,372	190,243	24,886	165,357	1,233	5,211	17,932	45,435	110,029	9,893
2011	4,574,836	194,150	25,406	168,744	1,268	5,239	18,386	46,320	113,301	9,123
2012	4,602,134	185,512	22,839	162,673	1,155	5,458	15,737	42,037	112,764	7,872
2013	4,625,470	189,295	23,609	165,686	1,244	5,548	16,319	41,184	115,342	9,160
2014	4,648,990	185,866	24,964	161,192	1,382	5,725	16,400	38,541	113,251	9,400
2015	4,670,724	183,097	26,468	156,629	1,723	5,550	17,454	35,453	111,435	9,741
2016	4,645,670	180,863	26,477	154,386	1,819	5,575	18,528	34,667	109,380	10,339
2017	4,663,461	183,804	26,092	157,712	1,867	5,358	18,285	34,265	112,485	10,962
2018	4,659,978	177,710	25,049	152,661	2,085	4,568	17,266	31,132	109,993	11,536

== By location ==
=== New Orleans ===
In 2019, New Orleans had 121 murders with a rate of 30.7, ranking it number four in the top homicide city rates in the U.S. Despite this high number nationwide, this is still one of the lowest homicide rates for New Orleans since 1971. In 2018, New Orleans had 143 murders. Other violent crimes in 2018 also experienced a drop from previous years. New Orleans had the highest murder rate of any major American city in 2008 (42.1 per 100,000 people) 2001 (44.0 per 100,000) 2002 (53.1 per 100,000) 2003 (57.7 per 100,000) 2004 (56.0 per 100,000) 2006 (70 per 100,000) 2007 (81 per 100,000) 2008 (63.6 per 100,000) 2009 (52 per 100,000) 2010 (51 per 100,000) and 2011 {57.6 per 100,000} as well.

=== Baton Rouge ===
In 2019, Baton Rouge had 83 murders with homicide rate was a per-capita homicide rate 31. This is a downwards trend from the 106 murders in 2017, the recent record high.

Homicides Per Year in Baton Rouge
Year	Homicide	Year	Homicide
2003	48	2012	84
2004	60	2013	64
2005	62	2014	63
2006	74	2015	78
2007	96	2016	62
2008	86	2017	106
2009	87	2018	87
2010	81	2019	83
2011	80		

==== 2011 ====
In In 2011, there were 15,134 crimes committed in Baton Rouge, including 64 murders, 51 forcible rapes, and 12,666 property crimes. The murder rate in Baton Rouge for 2011 was the 8th highest in the nation among large cities at 27.6 per 100,000. Baton Rouge also had the 25th highest violent crime rate in the U.S. in 2011 with a rate of 1,065.7 violent crimes per 100,000, surpassing New Orleans at 792 per 100,000. The Baton Rouge Police Department currently employs 789 police personnel (police officers, dispatchers and specialty positions).

== Capital punishment laws ==
Capital punishment is applied in Louisiana. Executions are carried out by lethal injection at the Louisiana State Penitentiary (also known as Angola) and the Louisiana Correctional Institute for Women at St. Gabriel.

The first recorded execution in Louisiana occurred on September 24, 1722, when an unnamed man was hanged in New Orleans for theft. The first execution in Louisiana as a U.S. state was of a male slave (name not recorded) for murder in St. Landry Parish in July 1812. The most recent execution took place on March 18, 2025, with 46-year-old Jessie Hoffman Jr. executed by nitrogen hypoxia for the murder of Molly Elliot. It was the first execution in Louisiana since 2010.

On June 29, 1972, the U.S. Supreme Court issued a ruling in Furman v. Georgia, which halted capital punishment in the United States. Prior to this moratorium, however, Louisiana had not carried out an execution since Jesse James Ferguson was put to death in 1961. Capital punishment was reinstated in Louisiana in 1976 following the U.S. Supreme Court decision in Gregg v. Georgia. The first execution to occur in the state following the lifting of the moratorium was on December 14, 1983, when Robert Wayne Williams was electrocuted. In total, Louisiana has executed 660 people. Eight convicted death row inmates have been exonerated in Louisiana since 1976.

== Notable criminals ==
- Nathaniel Code – 1980s serial killer of eight people.
- Ronald Dominique – A Louisiana serial killer with at least 23 victims.
- Sean Vincent Gillis – Serial killer of eight women.
- Derrick Todd Lee – Nicknamed the "Baton Rouge Serial Killer", he has been linked to seven murders.
- John Allen Muhammad – Born in Baton Rouge, the "Beltway Sniper" killed ten people around the Washington D.C. area during the Beltway sniper attacks. Muhammad and his accomplice, Lee Boyd Malvo, are also linked to shootings outside of Washington D.C. including two in Louisiana.
- Elmo Patrick Sonnier – Convicted murderer and rapist who became the inspiration for Sister Helen Prejean's best-selling book Dead Man Walking.
- Robert Lee Willie – Convicted murderer and rapist who also became the inspiration for Sister Helen Prejean's book Dead Man Walking. Sean Penn's physical appearance in the film was based on that of Willie.
- Angola 3 – The Angola 3 refers to 3 inmates, Robert Hillary King, Albert Woodfox and Herman Wallace, who were placed into solitary confinement at Angola after the death of a prison guard, Brent Miller. Their case led to several high-profile documentaries and legal interest concerning solitary confinement.
- Corey Miller – Better known as C-Murder, the rapper and actor is currently serving a life sentence for the murder of Steve Thomas at a nightclub in Harvey, Louisiana.
- Clifford Etienne – Also known as the "Black Rhino", Etienne is a former professional boxer who fought many notable boxers including Lawrence Clay Bey, Lamon Brewster, Mike Tyson, Calvin Brock, and Nicolay Valuev. He is currently serving a 105-year prison sentence for armed robbery, kidnapping, and the attempted murder of a police officer.
- Jean Lafitte – Early 19th century French pirate who operated in and around New Orleans and Barataria Bay, Louisiana. Lafitte and his fellow privateers fought in the Battle of New Orleans after receiving a full pardon from Andrew Jackson.
- Samuel Israel III – Born in New Orleans, Israel was founder and hedge fund manager of Bayou Hedge Fund Group. He was convicted of defrauding investors out of $450 million in one of Wall Street's biggest recent frauds. His crimes and subsequent manhunt have been featured on Dateline, America's Most Wanted, and American Greed.
- Edwin Edwards – Former Governor of Louisiana (1972–1980, 1984–1988 and 1992–1996) convicted of seventeen counts of racketeering, extortion, money laundering, mail fraud and wire fraud.
- Clementine Barnabet – Barnabet confessed to orchestrating and participating in 35 murders in southwest Louisiana and southeast Texas between 1920 and 1912. The veracity of her admissions have since been doubted.
- Axeman of New Orleans – Unidentified serial killer targeting Italian immigrants around 1918.
- Antoinette Frank – Antoinette Frank was a New Orleans police officer when she and her then boyfriend Rogers LaCaze killed Officer Ronald Williams and siblings Ha and Cuong Vu during a 1995 armed robbery at a Vietnamese restaurant, later dubbed the Kim Anh murders. She is currently the only woman on Louisiana's death row.
- Zachary Bowen – Former war hero and veteran met his girlfriend, Addie Hall, After Hurricane Katrina in 2006. Addie was supposedly preparing to leave Bowen. Then on October 17, 2006, Bowen jumped from the roof of a parking garage. A suicide note found in his pocket led police to his apartment where the dismembered remains of Addie Hall was found in pots and pans on the stove.

== Year by year ==
=== 2012 ===
All categories of crime decreased in 2012 from 2011, except for robbery, which saw a 4.6% increase. Louisiana's overall crime rate, at 4,037.5, ranked fourth among U.S. states in 2012. Among the ten largest cities in Louisiana, the town of Alexandria had the highest crime rate at 9,174.6 crimes per 100,000 people.

Property crimes represented 88% of all reported criminal acts in 2012. There were 162,936 property crimes committed in Louisiana that year. Property crimes include burglary, larceny/theft and motor vehicle theft. The rate for property crimes in 2012 stood at 3,540.6 which was a 3.9% decrease from 2011. Police reported 15,740 aggravated assaults for a rate of 342.0. This marked a 14.8% drop in the aggravated assault rate from 2011; the largest decrease of all crimes. Louisiana ranked eighth in the aggravated assault rate among U.S. states in 2012. In addition, 1,158 incidents of forcible rape were recorded by police in 2012 for a rate of 25.2. The forcible rape rate decreased 8.8% from 2011. Louisiana ranked 37th in the rate of forcible rape among U.S. states in 2012. Despite a 2.8% decrease in its murder rate for 2012, Louisiana had the highest murder rate among U.S. states at 10.8 homicides per 100,000 people. The total number of homicides perpetrated in Louisiana in 2012 were 495, a decrease of 11 murders from 2011. Firearms accounted for 370 murders or 81% of all homicides. With 193 homicides, New Orleans had the highest total number of murders for any city in Louisiana. Two police officers were murdered in the line of duty in 2012.

Louisiana had the highest incarceration rate (847.1 per 100,000) among U.S. states in 2013 for the 16th consecutive year. In 2012, Louisiana's prison population stood at 41,248, a 3.9% increase from 2011, for an incarceration rate of 893 prisoners per 100,000 people.

=== 2018 ===
According to the Louisiana Uniform Crime reporting program, there were 177,710 crimes reported in Louisiana in 2018. The year 2018 had the fewest non-violent criminal offenses since at least 2008. Violent crime decreased from 2017 to 2018, but 2012 still remains the lowest with its record of 22,868. Rape went up 12.7% from 2017 while murder/non-negligent manslaughter declined 7.8%. Additionally, robbery dropped 15% and aggravated assault dropped 1.5%. Handguns remain the leading murder weapon with a rate of 44.7% with firearm (type unknown) following close behind at 35.7%. Together, these two contribute for 80.4% of the murders. Similarly, robberies were committed mostly with firearms in 2018. Firearms were leading with 52% and strongarm listed with a percentage of 35%.
