= Dead Man Walking (film) =

1995 American drama film

- Theatrical release poster
- Directed by: Tim Robbins
- Screenplay by: Tim Robbins
- Based on: Dead Man Walking; 1993 book by Helen Prejean
- Produced by: Jon Kilik; Tim Robbins; Rudd Simmons
- Starring: Susan Sarandon; Sean Penn; Robert Prosky; Raymond J. Barry; R. Lee Ermey; Scott Wilson
- Cinematography: Roger A. Deakins
- Edited by: Lisa Zeno Churgin
- Music by: David Robbins
- Production companies: Working Title Films; Havoc
- Distributed by: Gramercy Pictures (United States); PolyGram Filmed Entertainment (International)
- Release dates: December 29, 1995 (United States); April 12, 1996 (United Kingdom)
- Running time: 122 minutes
- Country: United States
- Language: English
- Budget: $11 million
- Box office: $83 million

Dead Man Walking is a 1995 American crime drama film starring Susan Sarandon and Sean Penn, and co-produced and directed by Tim Robbins, who adapted the screenplay from the 1993 non-fiction book of the same name. It marked Peter Sarsgaard’s film debut.

In the film, Sister Helen Prejean (Sarandon) establishes a special relationship with Matthew Poncelet (Penn), a character based on convicted murderers Elmo Patrick Sonnier and Robert Lee Willie. He is a condemned prisoner on death row in Louisiana, and she visits him as his spiritual adviser after corresponding with him.

The film was a critical and commercial success. It grossed $83 million on a budget of $11 million and received praise for the performances of Penn and Sarandon, as well as Robbins' direction. Sarandon's performance won her the Academy Award for Best Actress, while Robbins and Penn were nominated for Best Director and Best Actor respectively. Bruce Springsteen was nominated for Best Original Song for the single "Dead Man Walkin'".

== Plot ==
Matthew Poncelet, who was sentenced to death for the murder and rape of a teenage couple, Walter Delacroix and Hope Percy, has been on death row at the Louisiana State Penitentiary for six years. His accomplice, Carl Vitello, was sentenced to life without parole. As his scheduled execution date approaches, Poncelet asks Sister Helen Prejean, with whom he has corresponded, to help him with a final appeal.

Sister Helen decides to visit Poncelet, who is arrogant, sexist and racist, and does not even pretend to feel remorse. He protests his innocence and insists Vitello killed the two teenagers. Convincing an experienced attorney, Hilton Barber, to take on Poncelet's case pro bono, Sister Helen tries to have his sentence commuted to life imprisonment. After many visits, she establishes a relationship with him. At the same time, she gets to know Poncelet's mother, Lucille, and his three brothers, Craig, Sonny, and Troy. She later meets the victims' parents, Earl Delacroix and Mary Beth and Clyde Percy. The victims' parents do not understand Sister Helen's efforts to help Poncelet, believing that she is "taking his side". They desire "absolute justice" (i.e., his life for those of their children).

Sister Helen's application for commutation is rejected. Poncelet asks Sister Helen to be his spiritual adviser through his execution, and she agrees. Sister Helen tells Poncelet that his redemption is possible only if he takes responsibility for what he did. Just before he is taken to be executed, Poncelet tearfully admits to Sister Helen that he had killed Walter Delacroix and raped Hope Percy, before Vitello killed her. As he is prepared for execution, he appeals to Walter Delacroix's father for forgiveness, and tells Hope Percy's parents that he hopes his death brings them peace.

== Cast ==
- Susan Sarandon as Sister Helen Prejean
- Sean Penn as Matthew Poncelet
- Robert Prosky as Hilton Barber
- Raymond J. Barry as Earl Delacroix
- R. Lee Ermey as Clyde Percy
- Celia Weston as Mary Beth Percy
- Lois Smith as Augusta Bourg Prejean
- Scott Wilson as Chaplain Farley
- Jon Abrahams as Sonny Poncelet
- Roberta Maxwell as Lucille Poncelet
- Margo Martindale as Sister Colleen
- Kevin Cooney as Governor Benedict
- Clancy Brown as State Trooper
- Michael Cullen as Carl Vitello
- Peter Sarsgaard as Walter Delacroix
- Missy Yager as Hope Percy
- Jack Black as Craig Poncelet
- Barton Heyman as Captain Beliveau
- Nesbitt Blaisdell as Warden Hartman
- Steve Boles as Sergeant Neal Trapp
- Shannon Proctor as Assistant to Governor Benedict

== Creation and conception ==
Christopher Buchanan, an associate producer of a PBS documentary, stated that: "The movie, based on the book by Sister Helen Prejean, combined the stories of the first two men she counseled on Louisiana's death row: Elmo Patrick Sonnier and Robert Lee Willie. In rather broad strokes, it is fair to say the film captures Sonnier's crime and Willie's character".

== Production ==
While filming The Client in New Orleans, Susan Sarandon came across Sister Helen Prejean’s book Dead Man Walking. She reached out to Sister Helen and met with her over lunch, later persuading Tim Robbins, her partner, to option the book for adaptation.

Robbins specifically sought Sean Penn for the role of Matthew Poncelet, stating: “I wanted the best actor I could find and he was the first name that came into my mind. I think he is the premier actor of my generation".

Sarandon almost dropped out of the film before production began, fearing that being directed by Robbins might strain their relationship. “I wasn’t sure we could do it together and not kill each other”, she admitted. Sarandon had been directed by ex-partner Louis Malle on Pretty Baby and Atlantic City, where similar tensions arose on set. Production on the film often stretched to 18 hours a day.

Two versions of the climactic execution scene were filmed: one in which Poncelet suffers an allergic reaction to the first shot and begins convulsing, and a more subdued version, which was ultimately used in the film.

Robbins later revealed that he was advised to omit the flashback sequence, shown during the execution, which depicts the rape and double murder of which Poncelet was found guilty. Robbins chose to keep the scene in, emphasising the need to remind the audience why Poncelet was on death row, and saying that “anyone can manipulate with propaganda... But it's more difficult to get to a resolution in a complicated way that allows both sides to have dignity".

Robbins said the film was “not directed at Democrats or Republicans — it’s directed at morality — which crosses political lines".

== Reception ==
=== Box office ===
Dead Man Walking debuted on December 29, 1995, in the United States. With a budget of $11 million, the film grossed $39,387,284 domestically and $43,701,011 internationally, for a total of $83,088,295 worldwide.

=== Critical response ===
Dead Man Walking was well received by critics. Rotten Tomatoes gives it a 95% positive rating based on reviews from 60 critics, with an average rating of 8.24/10. The site's consensus states: "A powerful, thought-provoking film that covers different angles of its topic without resorting to preaching, Dead Man Walking will cause the viewer to reflect regardless of their political viewpoint". Metacritic gives it a rating of 80/100 based on reviews from 26 critics, indicating "generally favorable" reviews.

Hal Hinson of The Washington Post commented: "What this intelligent, balanced, devastating movie puts before us is nothing less than a contest between good and evil". Kenneth Turan of the Los Angeles Times described the acting: "For this kind of straight-ahead movie to work, the acting must be strong without even a breath of theatricality, and in Penn and Sarandon, Dead Man Walking has performers capable of making that happen." Roger Ebert of the Chicago Sun-Times gave the film four stars, his highest rating, and called it "absorbing, surprising, technically superb and worth talking about for a long time afterward".

Robbins admitted that he wasn’t expecting Sarandon to win the Oscar for Best Actress. He told The Calgary Sun prior to the ceremony: “Susan deserves the Oscar this year. But her acting is far too subtle and the two of us are far too political for her to receive her due".

=== Accolades ===
Award	Category	Nominee(s)	Result	Ref.
Academy Awards	Best Director	Tim Robbins	Nominated	
Academy Awards	Best Actor	Sean Penn	Nominated	
Academy Awards	Best Actress	Susan Sarandon	Won	
Academy Awards	Best Original Song	"Dead Man Walkin'"; Music and Lyrics by Bruce Springsteen	Nominated	
Australian Film Institute Awards	Best Foreign Film	Jon Kilik, Tim Robbins, and Rudd Simmons	Nominated	
Berlin International Film Festival	Golden Bear	Tim Robbins	Nominated	
Berlin International Film Festival	Prize of the Ecumenical Jury	Tim Robbins	Won	
Berlin International Film Festival	Prize of the Guild of German Art House Cinemas	Tim Robbins	Won	
Berlin International Film Festival	Reader Jury of the "Berliner Morgenpost"	Tim Robbins	Won	
Berlin International Film Festival	Best Actor	Sean Penn	Won	
Blockbuster Entertainment Awards	Favorite Actress – Drama	Susan Sarandon	Nominated	
Chicago Film Critics Association Awards	Best Actor	Sean Penn	Nominated	
Chlotrudis Awards	Best Movie		Won	
Chlotrudis Awards	Best Actor	Sean Penn	Won	
Chlotrudis Awards	Best Actress	Susan Sarandon	Won	
David di Donatello Awards	Best Foreign Actress	Susan Sarandon	Won	
Golden Globe Awards	Best Actor in a Motion Picture – Drama	Sean Penn	Nominated	
Golden Globe Awards	Best Actress in a Motion Picture – Drama	Susan Sarandon	Nominated	
Golden Globe Awards	Best Screenplay – Motion Picture	Tim Robbins	Nominated	
Heartland International Film Festival	Studio Crystal Heart Award		Won	
Humanitas Prize Awards	Feature Film	Tim Robbins	Won	
Independent Spirit Awards	Best Male Lead	Sean Penn	Won	
Independent Spirit Awards	Best Supporting Female	Celia Weston	Nominated	
Kansas City Film Critics Circle Awards	Best Actress	Susan Sarandon	Won	
Movieguide Awards	Most Inspiring Movies		Won	
MTV Movie Awards	Best Female Performance	Susan Sarandon	Nominated	
National Society of Film Critics Awards	Best Actor	Sean Penn	Runner-up	
Nikkan Sports Film Awards	Best Foreign Film		Won	
Online Film & Television Association Awards	Film Hall of Fame: Productions		Inducted	
Palm Springs International Film Festival	Best Director	Tim Robbins	Won	
Political Film Society Awards	Exposé		Won	
Political Film Society Awards	Human Rights		Nominated	
Sant Jordi Awards	Best Foreign Actor	Sean Penn	Nominated	
Sant Jordi Awards	Best Foreign Actress	Susan Sarandon	Nominated	
Screen Actors Guild Awards	Outstanding Performance by a Male Actor in a Leading Role	Sean Penn	Nominated	
Screen Actors Guild Awards	Outstanding Performance by a Female Actor in a Leading Role	Susan Sarandon	Won	
Turkish Film Critics Association Awards	Best Foreign Film		18th Place	
USC Scripter Awards	USC Scripter Award	Tim Robbins (screenwriter); Helen Prejean (author)	Nominated	

- Tim Robbins dedicated the movie to his paternal grandfather, Lee Robbins, and maternal grandmother, Thelma Bledsoe, in gratitude for his college tuition.
- The real-life Helen Prejean can be seen briefly in the candlelight vigil scene outside the prison protesting the death penalty with the rest of the cast.

== Other versions ==
In 2002, Tim Robbins, who adapted the book for the film, also wrote a stage version of Dead Man Walking. The book has also been adapted as an opera by the same name, premiering in San Francisco.

== Legacy ==
Yvonne Koslovsky-Golan, author of The Death Penalty in American Cinema: Criminality and Retribution in Hollywood Film, stated that even though public debate on the death penalty increased for a period after the release of Dead Man Walking, the film did not result in "real political or legal change", but encouraged additional academic study on the death penalty.
