= Dead Man Walking (opera) =

Opera by Jake Heggie

- Opera by Jake Heggie
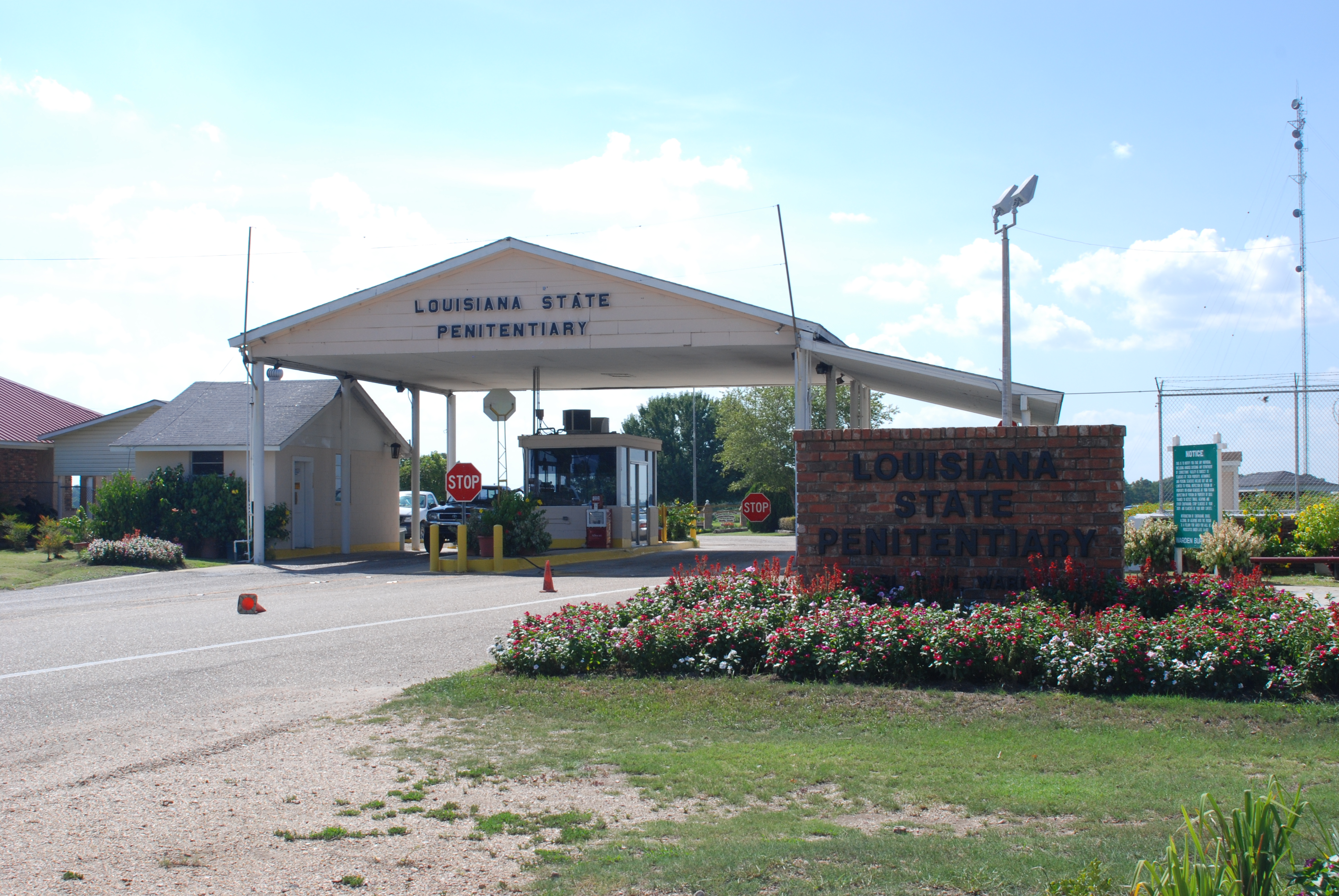
- Louisiana State Penitentiary, the opera's setting
- Librettist: Terrence McNally
- Based on: Dead Man Walking by Sister Helen Prejean, C.S.J.
- Premiere: October 7, 2000; War Memorial Opera House, San Francisco

Dead Man Walking is the first opera composed by American Jake Heggie, with a libretto by playwright Terrence McNally. Based on the book of the same name by Sister Helen Prejean, C.S.J., the work premiered on October 7, 2000, at the War Memorial Opera House, produced by the San Francisco Opera. It is among the most widely performed of 21st-century operas.

== Performance history ==
Dead Man Walking has been described as "the most performed 21st-century opera", and has received many productions around the world.

=== Premiere ===
The 2000 premiere production was commissioned by then-General Director Lotfi Mansouri. The stage director was Joe Mantello, and the conductor was Patrick Summers. Sets, costumes and lighting were designed by Michael Yeargan, Sam Fleming, and Jennifer Tipton, respectively. Susan Graham created the role of Sister Helen, with John Packard as Joseph De Rocher (a composite of Elmo Patrick Sonnier and Robert Lee Willie). Frederica von Stade performed the role of Mrs De Rocher, the convict's mother.

=== Australian, Canadian and European tours ===
The Australian premiere (the first performance outside the United States) took place in August 2003 at the State Opera of South Australia, with Kirsti Harms as Sister Helen and Teddy Tahu Rhodes as Joseph De Rocher. Sister Helen Prejean was in the audience. The production was nominated for seven Helpmann Awards in 2004, winning four: "Best Opera", "Best Direction of an Opera", "Best Female Performer in a Supporting Role in an Opera", and "Best Male in an Operatic Performance". The opera has since been performed numerous times across the United States and in other countries.

The Canadian premiere took place in January 2006 in Calgary, Alberta, with Daniel Okulitch in the role of Joseph De Rocher. The European premiere was given in May 2006 at the Semperoper in Dresden, Germany. The same production had its opening night on September 26, 2007, at the Theater an der Wien in Vienna and also played at the Malmö Opera in Malmö, Sweden. In 2007 it was revived for limited run at the State Theatre in Sydney and that same year was given its university and Rocky Mountain regional premiere at the University of Colorado at Boulder.

=== Return to U.S and new orchestration ===
It was also produced in St. Louis, Missouri, by the Union Avenue Opera Company in 2011.

A new orchestration of the opera for 31 musicians, prepared under Jake Heggie's direction, was premiered at the Yerba Buena Center for the Arts Theater in San Francisco in February 2015 by Opera Parallèle. The UK staged premiere took place at the Royal Conservatoire of Scotland in May 2019, with Carolyn Holt as Sister Helen and Mark Nathan as Joseph de Rocher.

The opera received a new production in March 2016 in New Orleans Opera, starring baritone Michael Mayes. The production, created by director Tomer Zvulun, traveled to The Atlanta Opera in March 2019, where it was performed by an all-star cast, including Jamie Barton, Michael Mayes, Maria Zifchak, Jay Hunter Morris, Kevin Burdette and Karen Slack.

A production starring J'Nai Bridges and Dan Okulitch was created for the inaugural Vancouver Opera Festival in 2017, directed by Joel Ivany, and remounted at Minnesota Opera in 2018. It was the first time that Sister Helen Prejean was sung by a woman of color.

Opera Delaware performed Dead Man Walking as part as their 2019 Festival.

The opera made its Lyric Opera of Chicago debut in November 2019, starring Ryan McKinny, Patricia Racette, and Susan Graham (who had played Sister Helen at the San Francisco premiere, but here played Mrs. De Rocher). The production was favorably received.

The opera was performed at the Israeli Opera in December 2019, in the same production by Tomer Zvulun. It featured Mayes and Zifchak, as well as the role debut of Maya Lahyani.

=== Delayed Metropolitan Opera production ===
A production staged by Ivo van Hove was supposed to be presented at the Metropolitan Opera during the 2020–21 season, but was postponed following the cancellation of the entire season due to COVID-19. The Metropolitan Opera opened its 2023–2024 season with this staging in September. It was broadcast live on WQXR, 105.9-FM in NY on Saturday, January 20th, 2024 at 1 PM as part of the Metropolitan Opera's "Live from the Met" series.

=== 2025: San Francisco and London ===
In 2025, the San Francisco Opera staged a 25th anniversary production featuring Jamie Barton as Sister Helen, Ryan McKinny as Joseph de Rocher, and Sister Helen role originator Susan Graham as Mrs. De Rocher. Patrick Summers, who conducted the world premiere in 2000, served as conductor.

The opera received its first full UK staging in 2025 at the London Coliseum in a co-production by English National Opera, Opera North and Finnish National Opera. The production won the Olivier Award for Best New Opera Production.

== Roles ==
Roles, voice types, premiere cast
Role	Voice type	Premiere cast, 7 October 2000 Conductor: Patrick Summers
Sister Helen Prejean, nun	mezzo-soprano	Susan Graham
Joseph De Rocher, convicted murderer	baritone	John Packard
Mrs. Patrick De Rocher, his mother	mezzo-soprano	Frederica von Stade
Her 19-year-old son	tenor	Eli Borggraefe
Her 14-year-old son	treble	Mario Sawaya
Sister Rose, colleague of Sister Helen	soprano	Theresa Hamm-Smith
Howard Boucher, father of the murdered boy	tenor	Gary Rideout
Jade Boucher, mother of the murdered boy	soprano	Catherine Cook
Owen Hart, father of the murdered girl	baritone	Robert Orth
Kitty Hart, mother of the murdered girl	soprano	Nicolle Foland
Father Grenville, chaplain at Louisiana State Penitentiary (Angola)	tenor	Jay Hunter Morris
George Benton, prison warden	baritone	John Ames
A Motor Cop	baritone	David Okerlund
First Prison Guard	baritone	David Okerlund
Second Prison Guard	baritone	Philip Horst
Sister Lillianne, colleague of Sister Helen	mezzo-soprano	Sally Mouzon
Sister Catherine, colleague of Sister Helen		Virginia Pluth
A mother		Rachel Perry
A Paralegal		Jim Croom
Five inmates		Richard Walker, Daniel Harper, David Kekuewa, Frederick Winthrop, Frederick Matthews
Mrs. Charlton		Donita Volkwijn
Jimmy Charlton		Jeremy Singletary
Anthony De Rocher, Joseph's brother	silent role	David Tenenbaum
Boy, victim	silent role	Sean San Jose
Girl, victim	silent role	Dawn Walters

== Synopsis ==
Place: Louisiana
Time: 1980s

Prologue: A teenage boy and a teenage girl are parked near a secluded lake at night, making out to the radio in their car. The De Rocher brothers, hiding nearby, emerge from the shadows, quietly. One turns the radio off; the two brothers attack the teens. Anthony grabs the boy, who begins struggling; Joseph attacks the girl and begins to rape her. The boy continues struggling until Anthony shoots him once, at the base of the skull, execution-style; this causes the girl to scream. In a panic, Joseph stabs her until she is silent.

=== Act 1 ===
Scene 1: Hope House, Sister Helen's mission, run by the Sisters of Saint Joseph of Medaille

Sister Helen, with the aid of some of the other sisters, is teaching the children a hymn; this hymn, "He Will Gather Us Around", becomes Helen's leitmotif during the course of the opera. After the children leave, Helen reveals to her colleagues that she has heard from an inmate on death row (Joseph de Rocher) with whom she has been corresponding. He has asked her to be his spiritual adviser through his execution, and she has decided to accept. The sisters are shocked, warning Helen of the dangers of her position, but she is firm.

Scene 2: The drive to the prison

Helen drives to Louisiana State Penitentiary (Angola) and muses on her acceptance of De Rocher's request. She is stopped by a motorcycle policeman for speeding, but he lets her off with a warning after a short humorous soliloquy; "I never gave a ticket to a nun before. Gave a ticket to an IRS agent once… got audited that year. Tell you what…"

Scene 3: Angola State Prison

Helen arrives at the prison and is met by Father Grenville, the prison chaplain, who conducts her inside.

Scene 4: Father Grenville's office

Father Grenville criticizes Sister Helen's choice to work with De Rocher, claiming that the man is unreachable; he tells her that she's in over her head. Helen responds that it is her duty to attempt to help the man. Father Grenville leaves her to meet with Warden Benton, who asks many of the same questions and also criticizes her decision. He conducts her to Death Row to meet with De Rocher.

Scene 5: Death Row

Warden Benton and Sister Helen walk through Death Row to reach the visiting room. They're heckled by the inmates (chorus) who in turn shout profanities at her and ask her to say prayers for them.

Scene 6: Death Row visiting room

Warden Benton conducts De Rocher into the visiting room. He is friendly and easy-going. They converse; he asks her to speak at the pardon board hearing on his behalf to have his sentence commuted to life. He seems convinced that she will not return to help him; she assures him that is not the case.

Scene 7: The pardon board hearing

Sister Helen is present with De Rocher's mother and two of his younger brothers, who plead with the pardon board on his behalf. One of Joseph's victims' parents lashes out at her in anger.

Scene 8: The courthouse parking lot

The four parents of De Rocher's victims speak angrily to his mother and to Sister Helen, who tries to calm both sides. The parents accuse her of not understanding their pain and sorrow. Word comes from the pardon board; De Rocher has not been granted commutation. Barring intercession from the governor for clemency, he is to die for his crime.

Scene 9: Death Row visiting room

De Rocher is convinced that Helen has abandoned him; she enters, late, and tells him that she has not and will not. He is angry and rejects all her suggestions to confess and make peace with his actions. The warden enters and tells Helen to leave at once.

Scene 10: The prison waiting room

Helen is trying to find money to buy food from the vending machine, having forgotten to eat. She begins to hear the voices, in her head, of the parents, the children at Hope House, Father Grenville, the motorcycle policeman, Warden Benton, and her colleagues, all telling her to stop trying to help De Rocher. The warden enters to tell her that the governor has refused to act to save him, and gives Helen some money for the machine. She stands for a moment, then faints.

=== Act 2 ===
Scene 1: Joseph De Rocher's prison cell

A guard enters and tells De Rocher, who is doing pushups, that his execution date has been set for August 4. The guard leaves; Joseph muses on his fate.

Scene 2: Sister Helen's bedroom

Helen wakes up in terror from a nightmare, alarming Sister Rose, who begs her to stop working with De Rocher. Rose reminds her that she has not slept well since she began helping him. Helen says she cannot; the two women pray for the strength to forgive De Rocher.

Scene 3: Joseph's cell

It is the evening of the date set for the execution. De Rocher and Sister Helen are talking; they discover they share a common love for Elvis. For the first time he admits that he is afraid. She reassures him, urging him to confess and make peace with what he has done; again he refuses. The warden enters and informs them that his mother is there to see him.

Scene 4: The visiting room

Mrs. De Rocher and her two younger sons have arrived. Joseph visits with them, and tries to apologize; she does not hear him, preferring to believe to the end that he is innocent. She complains that she baked him cookies, but was not allowed to bring them in. She asks Helen to take a last picture of the four of them together with the camera in her purse. The guards lead Joseph away; she looks after him, reminiscing, near tears, eventually losing control. She thanks Helen for all that she has done; Helen promises to take the cookies for her.

Scene 5: Outside the Death House

Helen speaks with the victims' parents. One of them, Owen Hart, takes her aside and confesses that he is less sure of what he wants now than he was; he tells her that he and his wife have separated due to the stress they have felt. Helen tries to console him; they agree to part as "Fellow victims of Joseph De Rocher".

Scene 6/7: Joseph's holding cell

Helen and De Rocher converse for the last time; she asks him to confess to the murders. This time, something in him snaps; he breaks down and tells her the entire story. He expects Helen to hate him; instead, she says she forgives him, and that she will be "the face of love" for him. He thanks her. Father Grenville enters and begins the final preparations for the execution.

Scene 8: March to the execution chamber/The execution chamber

Guards, inmates, the warden, the parents, the chaplain, and protesters assembled outside the prison sing the Lord's Prayer as Sister Helen reads a passage from the book of Isaiah. They approach the death chamber, and Helen is separated from De Rocher. The warden asks if he has any last words; he says he does, and asks forgiveness from the parents of the murdered teenagers. The warden gives the nod, and the execution proceeds. De Rocher dies thanking Helen once again for her love; the opera ends as she stands over his body and sings her hymn one last time.

== Critical reaction ==
Critical reaction to the opera was generally favorable; in particular, critics praised the sharp, finely delineated performances by the principals and the simple yet effective production. "It was a triumph beyond what even its most optimistic boosters could have predicted" wrote the San Francisco Chronicle's critic. "The reason for the work's appeal lies in its almost perfect fusion of ideas and emotions," wrote The Australian in 2007.

Many also found that McNally's libretto to be among the most finely crafted in recent memory: "the splendid libretto – by turns plainspoken and eloquent, with wonderful splashes of wry humor to lighten the tone when it most needs it – creates the structural backbone of this wrenching drama". Although not all of it has been set to music, McNally gave the libretto to Heggie with the express instructions to use whatever portions of it he felt necessary, and to discard the rest.

== Recordings ==
- 2002 live recording: with Susan Graham as Sister Helen, Frederica von Stade as the murderer's mother and John Packard as the condemned man, conducted by Patrick Summers. Taken from the world premiere run of performances. Erato/Warner Classics, 2-CD set, cat. no. 8573-86238 ASIN B000059ZHR.
- 2010 live recording: with Joyce DiDonato as Sister Helen starring in a production at Houston Grand Opera, also conducted by Patrick Summers. A 2-CD set was issued by Virgin Classics/EMI in 2010, cat. no. 50999 6 02463 2 5
