= 2nd Screen Actors Guild Awards =

- Awarded for: Outstanding motion picture and primetime television performances
- Date: February 24, 1996
- Location: Santa Monica Civic Auditorium; Los Angeles, California
- Country: United States
- Presented by: Screen Actors Guild
- Website: www.sagawards.org

Television/radio coverage
- Network: NBC

The 2nd Screen Actors Guild Awards, awarded by the Screen Actors Guild and honoring the best achievements in film and television performances for the year 1995, took place on February 24, 1996. The ceremony was held at the Santa Monica Civic Auditorium in Los Angeles, California, and was televised live by NBC. The nominees were announced on January 18, 1996. This was the first year the category of Outstanding Performance by a Cast in a Motion Picture was offered.

== Winners and nominees ==
Winners are listed first and highlighted in boldface.

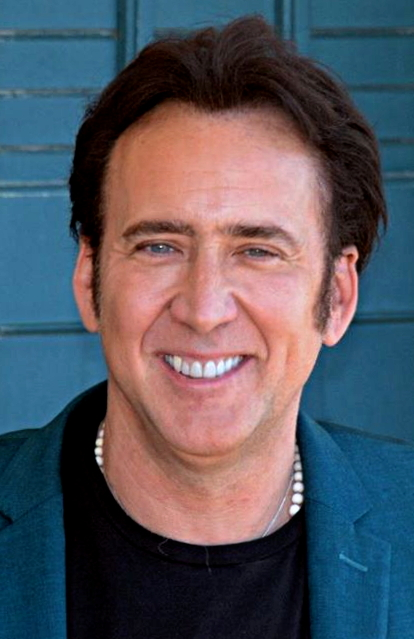
Nicolas Cage, Outstanding Performance by a Male Actor in a Leading Role winner

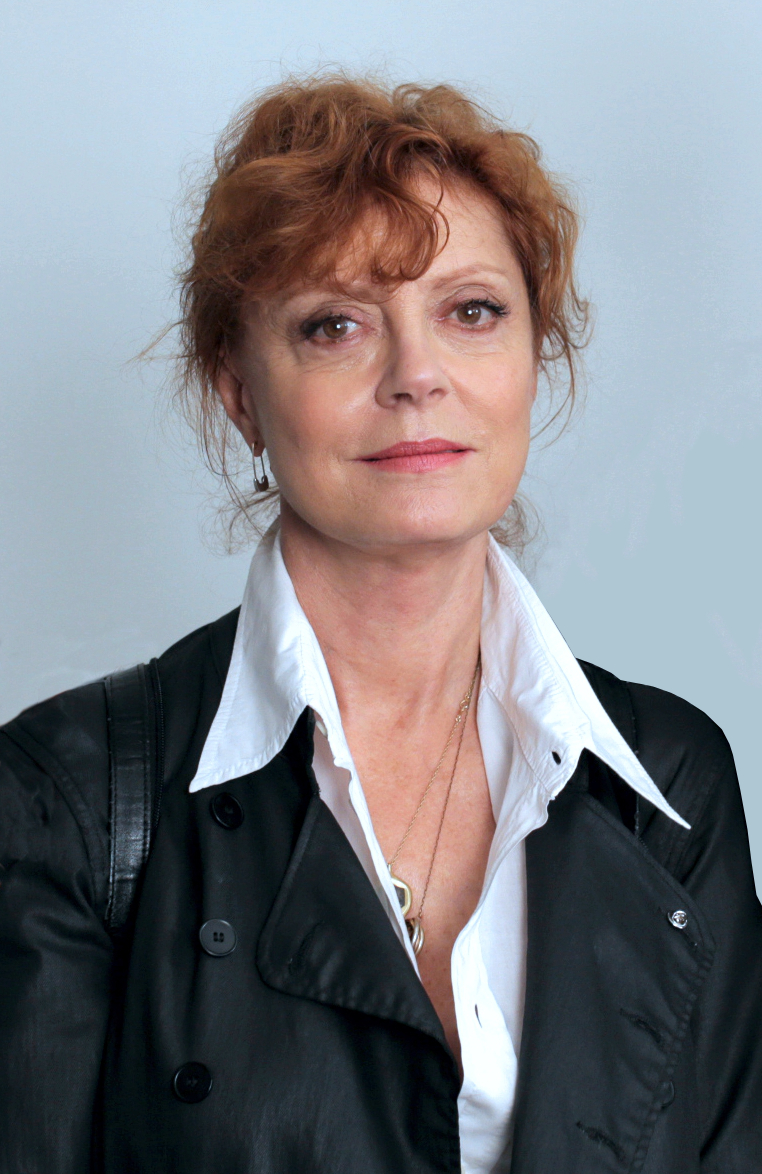
Susan Sarandon, Outstanding Performance by a Female Actor in a Leading Role winner

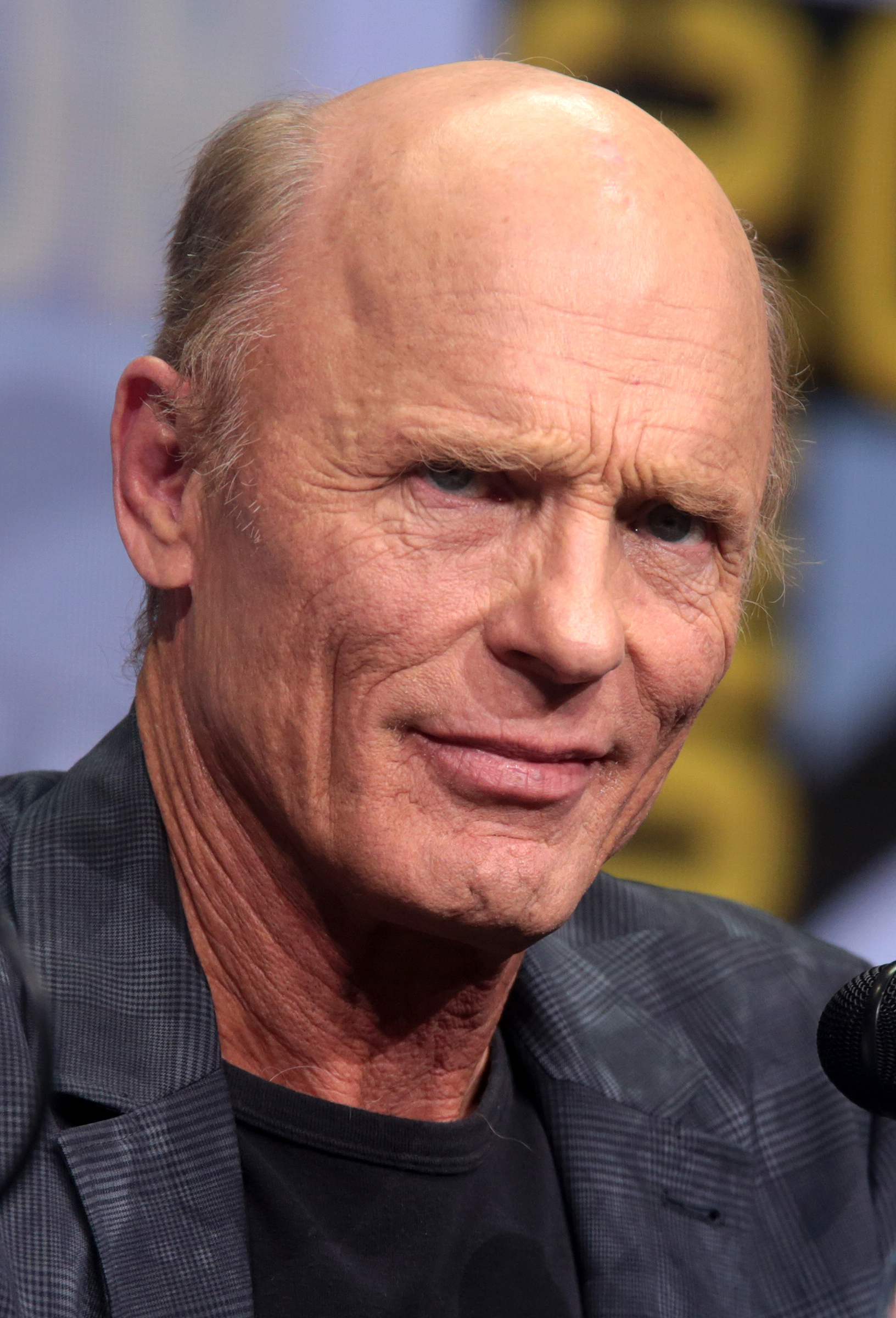
Ed Harris, Outstanding Performance by a Male Actor in a Supporting Role winner

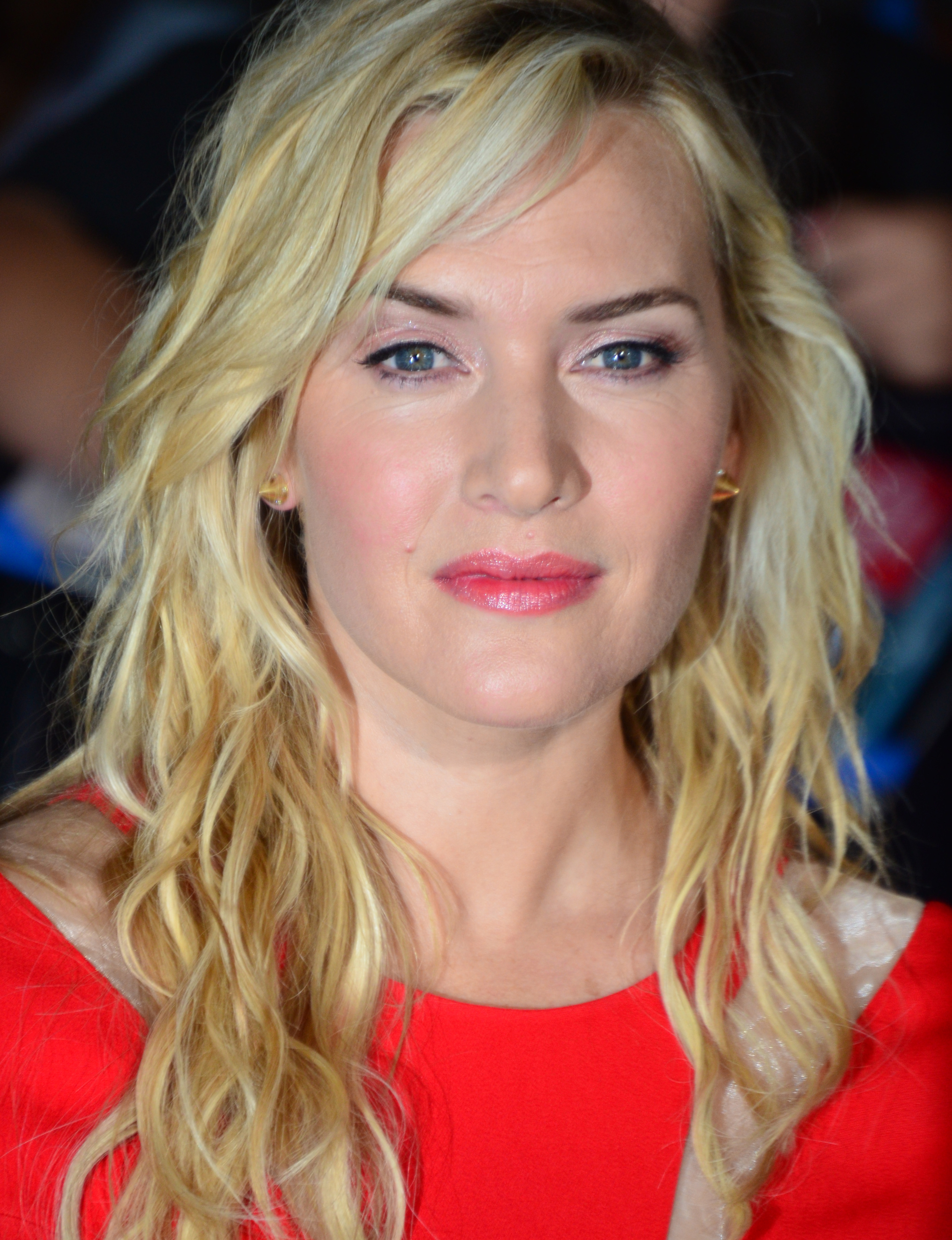
Kate Winslet, Outstanding Performance by a Female Actor in a Supporting Role winner

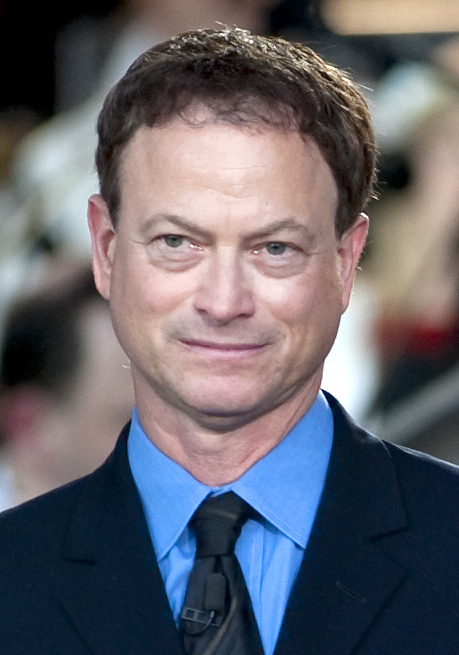
Gary Sinise, Outstanding Performance by a Male Actor in a Miniseries or Television Movie winner

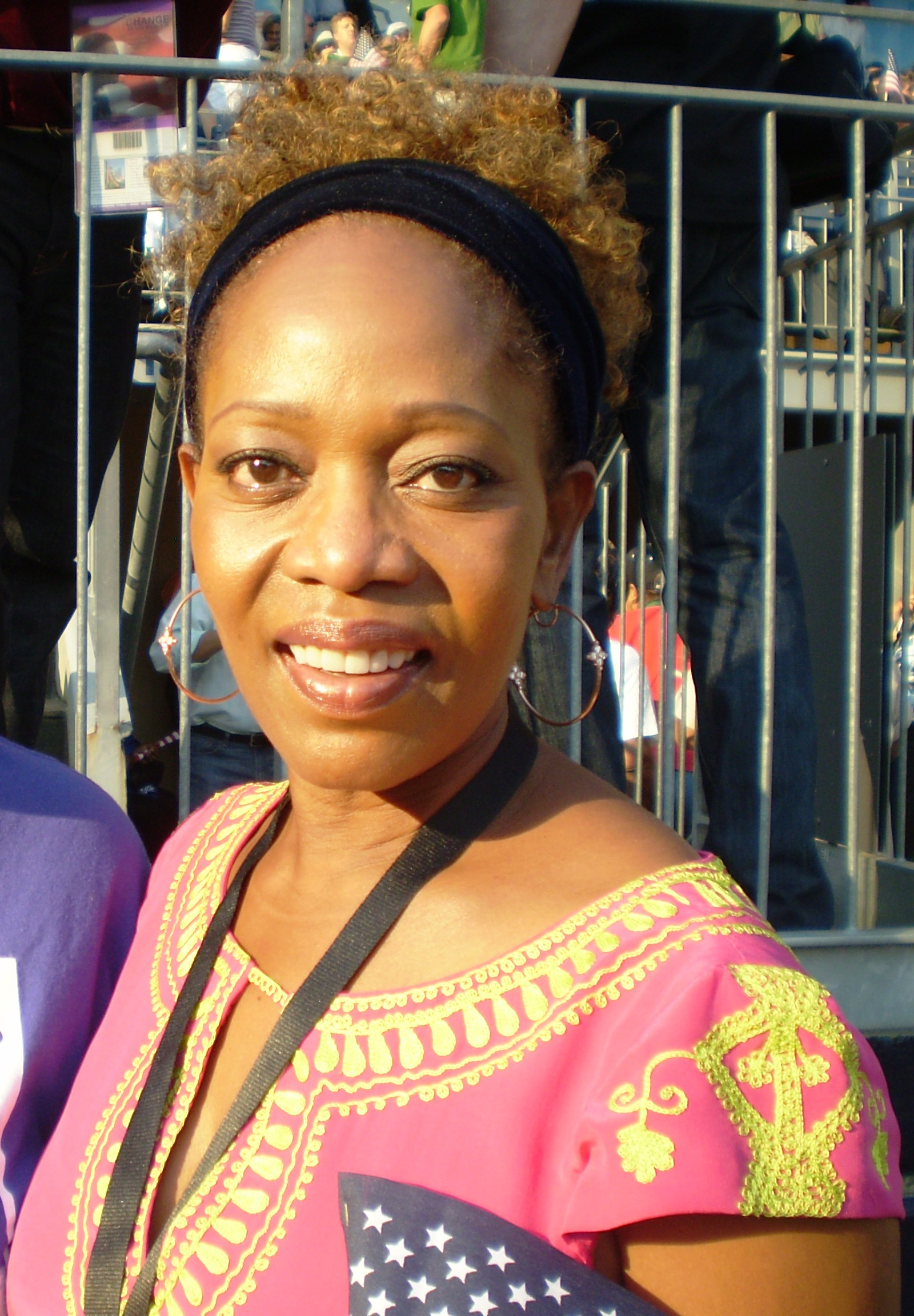
Alfre Woodard, Outstanding Performance by a Female Actor in a Miniseries or Television Movie winner

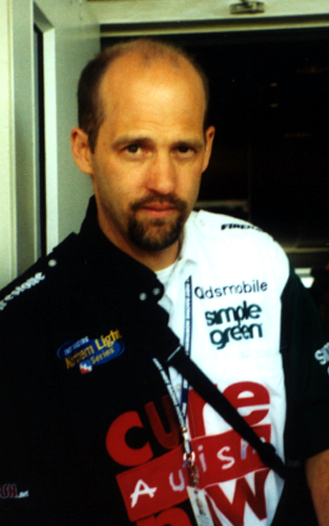
Anthony Edwards, Outstanding Performance by a Male Actor in a Drama Series winner

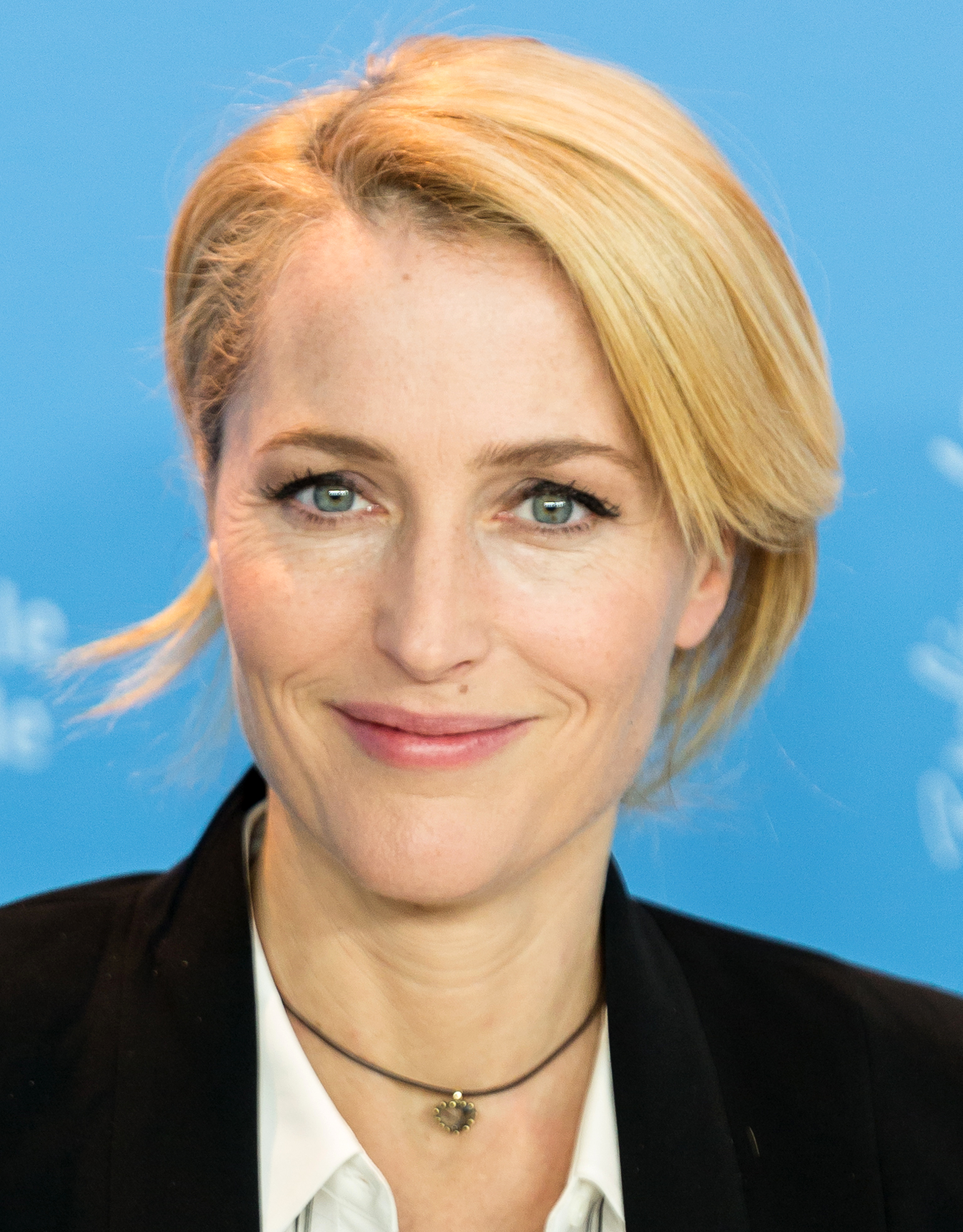
Gillian Anderson, Outstanding Performance by a Female Actor in a Drama Series winner

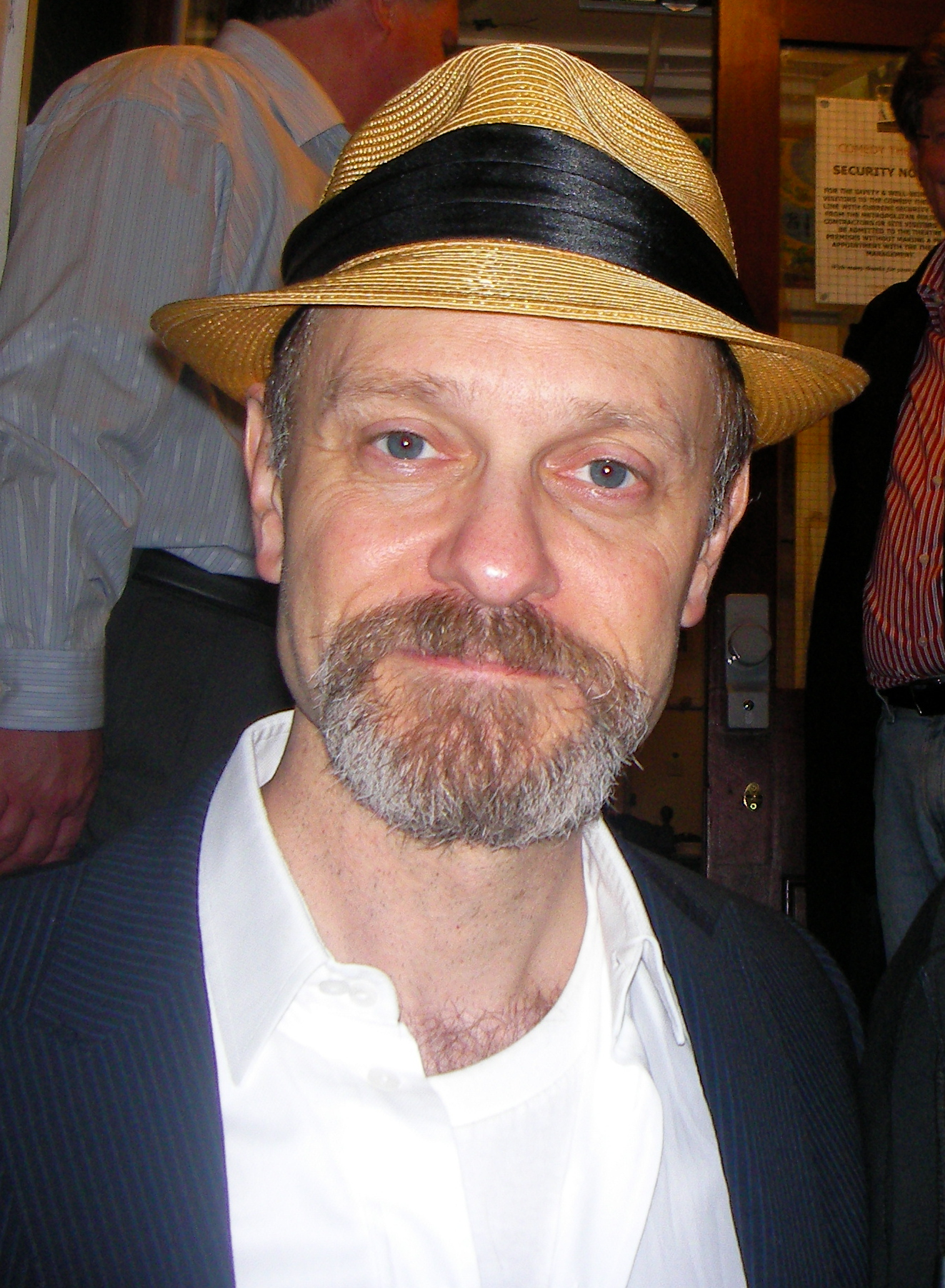
David Hyde Pierce, Outstanding Performance by a Male Actor in a Comedy Series winner

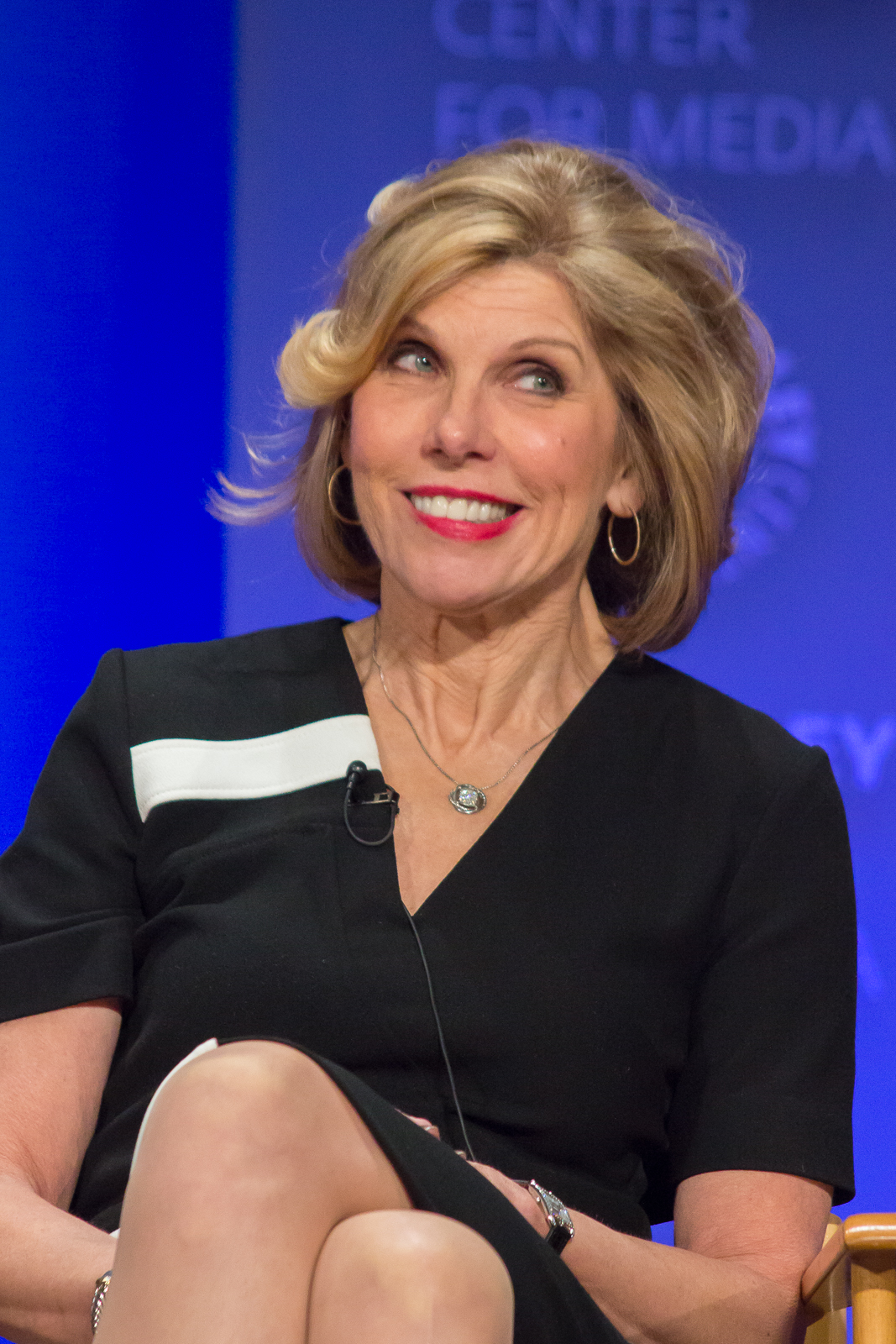
Christine Baranski, Outstanding Performance by a Female Actor in a Comedy Series winner

=== Film ===
Outstanding Performance by a Male Actor in a Leading Role	Outstanding Performance by a Female Actor in a Leading Role
**Nicolas Cage – Leaving Las Vegas as Ben Sanderson**; Anthony Hopkins – Nixon as Richard Nixon; James Earl Jones – Cry, the Beloved Country as Reverend Stephen Kumalo; Sean Penn – Dead Man Walking as Matthew Poncelet; Massimo Troisi – Il Postino: The Postman as Mario Ruoppolo	**Susan Sarandon – Dead Man Walking as Sister Helen Prejean**; Joan Allen – Nixon as Pat Nixon; Elisabeth Shue – Leaving Las Vegas as Sera; Meryl Streep – The Bridges of Madison County as Francesca Johnson; Emma Thompson – Sense and Sensibility as Elinor Dashwood
Outstanding Performance by a Male Actor in a Supporting Role	Outstanding Performance by a Female Actor in a Supporting Role
**Ed Harris – Apollo 13 as Gene Kranz**; Kevin Bacon – Murder in the First as Henri Young; Kenneth Branagh – Othello as Iago; Don Cheadle – Devil in a Blue Dress as Mouse Alexander; Kevin Spacey – The Usual Suspects as Roger "Verbal" Kint	**Kate Winslet – Sense and Sensibility as Marianne Dashwood**; Stockard Channing – Smoke as Ruby McNutt; Anjelica Huston – The Crossing Guard as Mary; Mira Sorvino – Mighty Aphrodite as Linda Ash; Mare Winningham – Georgia as Georgia Flood
Outstanding Performance by a Cast in a Motion Picture
**Apollo 13 – Kevin Bacon, Tom Hanks, Ed Harris, Bill Paxton, Kathleen Quinlan, and Gary Sinise**; Get Shorty – Danny DeVito, Dennis Farina, James Gandolfini, Gene Hackman, Delroy Lindo, David Paymer, Rene Russo, and John Travolta; How to Make an American Quilt – Maya Angelou, Anne Bancroft, Ellen Burstyn, Samantha Mathis, Kate Nelligan, Winona Ryder, Jean Simmons, Lois Smith, and Alfre Woodard; Nixon – Joan Allen, Brian Bedford, Powers Boothe, Kevin Dunn, Fyvush Finkel, Annabeth Gish, Tony Goldwyn, Larry Hagman, Ed Harris, Edward Herrmann, Anthony Hopkins, Bob Hoskins, Madeline Kahn, E. G. Marshall, David Paymer, David Hyde Pierce, Paul Sorvino, Mary Steenburgen, J. T. Walsh, and James Woods; Sense and Sensibility – Hugh Grant, Alan Rickman, Emma Thompson, and Kate Winslet

=== Television ===
Outstanding Performance by a Male Actor in a Miniseries or Television Movie	Outstanding Performance by a Female Actor in a Miniseries or Television Movie
**Gary Sinise – Truman as Harry S. Truman**; Alec Baldwin – A Streetcar Named Desire as Stanley Kowalski; Laurence Fishburne – The Tuskegee Airmen as Hannibal Lee; James Garner – The Rockford Files: A Blessing in Disguise as Jim Rockford; Tommy Lee Jones – The Good Old Boys as Hewey Calloway	**Alfre Woodard – The Piano Lesson as Berniece Charles**; Glenn Close – Serving in Silence: The Margarethe Cammermeyer Story as Margarethe Cammermeyer; Sally Field – A Woman of Independent Means as Bess Alcott Steed Garner; Anjelica Huston – Buffalo Girls as Calamity Jane; Sela Ward – Almost Golden: The Jessica Savitch Story as Jessica Savitch
Outstanding Performance by a Male Actor in a Drama Series	Outstanding Performance by a Female Actor in a Drama Series
**Anthony Edwards – ER as Mark Greene**; George Clooney – ER as Doug Ross; David Duchovny – The X-Files as Fox Mulder; Dennis Franz – NYPD Blue as Andy Sipowicz; Jimmy Smits – NYPD Blue as Bobby Simone	**Gillian Anderson – The X-Files as Dana Scully**; Christine Lahti – Chicago Hope as Kathryn Austin; Sharon Lawrence – NYPD Blue as Sylvia Costas; Julianna Margulies – ER as Carol Hathaway; Sela Ward – Sisters as Theodora "Teddy" Reed Margolis Falconer Sorenson
Outstanding Performance by a Male Actor in a Comedy Series	Outstanding Performance by a Female Actor in a Comedy Series
**David Hyde Pierce – Frasier as Niles Crane**; Jason Alexander – Seinfeld as George Costanza; Kelsey Grammer – Frasier as Frasier Crane; Paul Reiser – Mad About You as Paul Buchman; Michael Richards – Seinfeld as Cosmo Kramer	**Christine Baranski – Cybill as Maryann Thorpe**; Candice Bergen – Murphy Brown as Murphy Brown; Helen Hunt – Mad About You as Jamie Buchman; Lisa Kudrow – Friends as Phoebe Buffay; Julia Louis-Dreyfus – Seinfeld as Elaine Benes
Outstanding Performance by an Ensemble in a Drama Series
**ER – George Clooney, Anthony Edwards, Eriq La Salle, Julianna Margulies, Gloria Reuben, Sherry Stringfield, and Noah Wyle**; Chicago Hope – Adam Arkin, Peter Berg, Jayne Brook, Vondie Curtis-Hall, Héctor Elizondo, Thomas Gibson, Roxanne Hart, Christine Lahti, Peter MacNicol, Mandy Patinkin, and Jamey Sheridan; Law & Order – Benjamin Bratt, Jill Hennessy, Steven Hill, S. Epatha Merkerson, Chris Noth, Jerry Orbach, and Sam Waterston; NYPD Blue – Gordon Clapp, Kim Delaney, Dennis Franz, Sharon Lawrence, James McDaniel, Justine Miceli, Gail O'Grady, Jimmy Smits, and Nicholas Turturro; Picket Fences – Amy Aquino, Kathy Baker, Don Cheadle, Holly Marie Combs, Kelly Connell, Fyvush Finkel, Lauren Holly, Costas Mandylor, Marlee Matlin, Justin Shenkarow, Tom Skerritt, Ray Walston, and Adam Wylie
Outstanding Performance by an Ensemble in a Comedy Series
**Friends – Jennifer Aniston, Courteney Cox, Lisa Kudrow, Matt LeBlanc, Matthew Perry, and David Schwimmer**; Cybill – Christine Baranski, Dedee Pfeiffer, Alan Rosenberg, Cybill Shepherd, Alicia Witt, and Tom Wopat; Frasier – Dan Butler, Peri Gilpin, Kelsey Grammer, Jane Leeves, John Mahoney, and David Hyde Pierce; Mad About You – Helen Hunt, Leila Kenzle, John Pankow, Anne Ramsay, and Paul Reiser; Seinfeld – Jason Alexander, Julia Louis-Dreyfus, Michael Richards, and Jerry Seinfeld

=== Screen Actors Guild Life Achievement Award ===
- Robert Redford

== Multiple nominations ==
=== Film ===
Nominations	Film
3	Nixon
3	Sense and Sensibility
2	Apollo 13
2	Dead Man Walking
2	Leaving Las Vegas

=== Television ===
Nominations	Program
4	ER
4	NYPD Blue
4	Seinfeld
3	Frasier
3	Mad About You
2	Chicago Hope
2	Cybill
2	Friends
2	The X-Files

== Multiple wins ==
=== Film ===
Wins	Film
2	Apollo 13

=== Television ===
Wins	Program
2	ER
