= Dead Man Walking (play) =

2002 play written by Tim Robbins

Dead Man Walking is a 2002 play written by American actor and director Tim Robbins based on Dead Man Walking, a book by Sister Helen Prejean, C.S.J. about her experiences as a chaplain on death row. Sister Prejean's book was earlier adapted as a film which Robbins directed; it starred Sean Penn and Susan Sarandon. It was also adapted as an opera, first produced in 2000.

Rather than producing the play professionally for commercial performances, in 2004 Robbins offered the play to schools and colleges throughout the United States, particularly Catholic Jesuit schools. The project, titled "The Dead Man Walking School Theatre Project", is managed by the "Ministry Against the Death Penalty," where Sister Prejean now bases her advocacy work against the death penalty. The University of Scranton was one of the original Jesuit universities to perform the play in their 2004-2005 season.

== History of the play ==
Sister Helen Prejean, who had become an internationally known human rights activist as a result of her book, Dead Man Walking, first conceived the idea of a stage version of her work in 1998. She had read a New Yorker magazine article that said Arthur Miller's play, Death of a Salesman, had been performed a million times, and was performed every day somewhere in the world. Sister Helen realized that if Dead Man Walking could be adapted as a play, its influence would be expanded.

Sister Helen had previously worked with Tim Robbins on the film version of her book. She invited him to write a stage adaptation of her book, and he accepted.

Robbins and Prejean decided that, rather than take the play to Broadway, he would "use the play as a tool to create deeper reflections on the death penalty in our nation's high schools and colleges." The performance requirements are that any school mounting a production must also involve at least two academic departments to offer courses pertaining to the death penalty.

According to the Catholic Mobilizing Network and the play's website:

Since the launch of the project in the fall of 2003, more than 250 high schools and colleges across the country have produced the play, conducted academic courses on the death penalty, and brought the issue to life on their campuses through art, music, and public education and action events.

== Participating schools ==
More than 250 educational institutions — high schools, colleges, and universities — have produced the play in the U.S., including Puerto Rico, and also in Canada, England, and Africa.

The play was performed by the King's College Theatre Department under the direction of M. Sheileen Godwin in February 2008, as part of Tim Robbins experiment. The show's cast was made up mainly of students and faculty members, as well as members of the community. Sister Helen Prejean came to King's College just days before the show opened and spoke with the entire campus community about her experiences. She also addressed the actors who were performing in the play and attended a dress rehearsal.
