= Alice Geoffray =

Alice Randazza Geoffray (1924–2009) was an American educator who founded the Adult Education Center in New Orleans.

== Early life and education ==
Born in New Orleans, Geoffray earned a B.A. from St. Mary's Dominican College in 1944, a Master of Education from Tulane University in 1970, and a Doctorate in Educational Administration from the University of New Orleans in 1978.

== Career ==
Geoffray began her career as a schoolteacher and held teaching positions at L.E. Rabouin Vocational High School, Francis T. Nichols Senior High School, and schools in Iberville Parish. She also worked as an adjunct professor at Southern University of New Orleans and retired in 1991 as the Director of Vocational Education for New Orleans Public Schools.

In 1965, Geoffray founded the Adult Education Center on Exchange Place as a tuition-free institution offering vocational training and academic instruction to Black women. Despite facing rejections from around 60 landlords, Geoffray secured a space through attorney and businessman James J. Coleman Sr., who chaired the center's board. Norman Francis, then a senior administrator at Xavier University of New Orleans, also provided guidance.

Adult Education Center operated as a tuition-free business school that combined academic instruction with vocational training in skills such as typing and shorthand. The program operated until 1972 and ultimately trained 431 women. Graduates of the program were among the first Black secretaries employed by multinational corporations and local businesses in New Orleans, contributing to workforce integration and the advancement of equal employment opportunities in the Southern United States.

The U.S. Department of Labor recognized the center as one of the most effective government-funded programs of its type, and the Wall Street Journal noted its job-placement success. In 1968, Geoffray and several students testified before a U.S. Senate subcommittee on the program's success relative to other job-training initiatives.

From 1972 to 1974, Geoffray served as the first State Coordinator of Career Education at the Louisiana State Board of Education.

== Writing ==
Geoffray authored several textbooks, including Communication Skills for Succeeding in the World of Work, Pounding the Pavement, and A Crash Course in College Cash.

== Personal life ==
Geoffray was married to Rudolph C. Geoffray, a music teacher, until his death in 1997 and they had 8 children.

== Awards and recognition ==
Her work was recognized with awards such as the Classroom Teachers Award from the Freedom Foundation in 1963 and the New Orleans Martin Luther King Torch Bearer Award in 2001.

In 2021, one of the former sites of McDonogh 35 High School in New Orleans was renamed as Dr. Alice Geoffray School in her honor.
