= List of commencement addresses given by Helen Prejean =

The following is a list of commencement speeches given by Sister Helen Prejean.

University	Location	Date
University of Glasgow	Scotland	July 10, 1995
Georgetown University Law Center	Washington, DC	May 27, 1996
Seton Hall University	Newark, NJ	June 1, 1996
St. John's University	New York, NY	September 22, 1996
Mount St. Mary's College	Metairie, LA	March 26, 1997
College of Mount St. Vincent	Riverdale, NY	May 17, 1997
St. Theresa's Academy	Kansas City, MO	May 18, 1997
Amherst College	Amherst, MA	May 24–25, 1997
Fontbonne College	Metairie, LA	September 3, 1997
Tulane University	New Orleans, LA	December 12, 1997
Our Lady of Holy Cross College	New Orleans, LA	April 3, 1998
Gonzaga University	Spokane, WA	May 10, 1998
Notre Dame College	Manchester, NH	May 16, 1998
St. Joseph College	West Hartford, CT	May 17, 1998
Eastern College	St. Davids, PA	December 10, 1998
Maryville University of St. Louis	St. Louis, MO	May 2, 1999
Louisiana State University	Baton Rouge, LA	May 4, 1999
Barry University	Miami Shores, FL	May 8, 1999
Avila College	Kansas City, MO	May 15, 1999
Cabrini College	Radnor, PA	May 16, 1999
College of the Holy Cross	Worcester, MA	May 28, 1999
Misericordia College	Dallas, PA	September 21, 1999
Kings College	Barre, PA	September 22, 1999
Christian Brothers University (Note: Prejean was also awarded the Dozier Award for Peace and Justice.)	Memphis, TN	May 13, 2000
St. Thomas University	Fredericton, New Brunswick,	May 15, 2000
Alvernia College	Reading, PA	May 20, 2000
Goshen College	Goshen, IN	May 21, 2000
Northeastern University	Boston, MA	May 26, 2000
University of Western Ontario	London, Ontario, Canada	June 7, 2000
DePaul University	Chicago, IL	June 10, 2000
Women's Conference	Tokyo, Japan	January 19-February 1, 2001
Manchester College	North Manchester, IN	March 26, 2001
College of St. Elizabeth	Morristown, NJ	April 6–7, 2001
St. Mary of the Woods College	St. Mary of the Woods IN	May 5, 2001
Wheeling Jesuit University	Wheeling, WV	May 12, 2001
University of Scranton	Scranton, PA	May 27, 2001
Hendrix College	Conway, AR	November 14, 2001
The College of Saint Rose	Albany, NY	December 15, 2001
University of Dayton	Dayton, OH	May 2, 2002
Ball State University	Muncie, IN	May 4, 2002
Marygrove College	Detroit, MI	May 11, 2002
Governors State University	University Park, IL	June 2, 2002
National University of Ireland	Galway, Ireland	June 28, 2002
Catholic Theological Union	Chicago, IL	June 5, 2003
City University of New York	New York, NY	May 21, 2004
Anna Maria College	New Orleans, LA	May 23, 2004
Saint Francis University	Loretto, PA	May 8, 2005
Loyola University	New Orleans, LA	May 14, 2005
University of Portland	Portland, OR	May 7, 2005
St. Joseph's University	Philadelphia, PA	May 13, 2006
Bellarmine University	Louisville, KY	December 20, 2006
Oblate School of Theology	San Antonio, TX	May 11, 2007
Lewis University	Romeoville, IL	May 13, 2007
Marian College	Fon du Lac, WI	May 19, 2007
University of Colorado	Denver, CO	May 9, 2008
Denison University	Granville, OH	May 14, 2016
