= St. Mary's Dominican College =

Women's college in New Orleans, Louisiana

Coordinates: 29.9368°N 90.1279°W

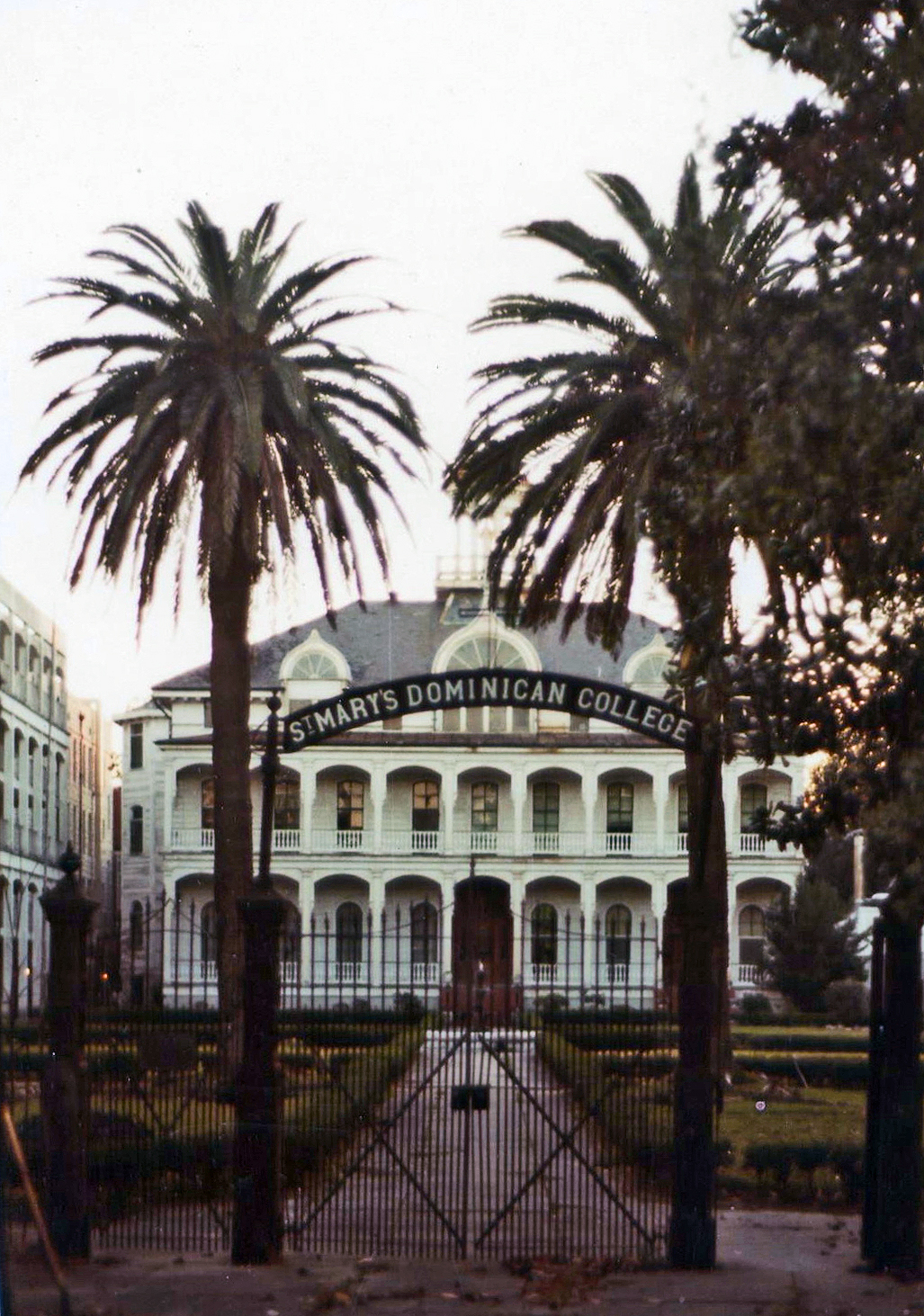
Main gateway of St. Mary's Dominican College on St. Charles Avenue, about 1980

St. Mary's Dominican College was a liberal arts college for women in New Orleans, in the U.S. state of Louisiana.

== History ==
The college was founded by the Dominican Sisters congregation of St. Mary as St. Mary's Academy. The high school section separated to become St. Mary's Dominican High School.

St. Mary's Dominican College was chartered in 1910 and operated until 1984, when it was disbanded. Its grounds were sold to Loyola University, and became Loyola's Broadway campus.

== Notable alumnae ==
- Helen Prejean, CSJ – Roman Catholic nun and leading American anti-death penalty activist

=== Notable faculty ===
- Angela Gregory – sculptor and art professor, was sculptor-in-residence at the college for some time
- John Kennedy Toole – novelist, best known for A Confederacy of Dunces, briefly taught English at the school
