= Robert Lee Willie =

American murderer (1958–1984)

- Willie in 1983
- Born: January 2, 1958; Mandeville, Louisiana, U.S.
- Died: December 28, 1984 (aged 26); Louisiana State Penitentiary, Louisiana, U.S.
- Status: Executed by electrocution
- Convictions: Federal; Kidnapping (2 counts); Conspiracy to commit kidnapping Louisiana; First degree murder Second degree murder (2 counts); Aggravated kidnapping (2 counts); Aggravated rape (2 counts)
- Penalty: Federal; Life imprisonment Louisiana; Death

Details
- Victims: 3–6
- Span of crimes: 1978–1980
- Country: United States
- State: Louisiana

Robert Lee Willie (January 2, 1958 – December 28, 1984) was an American serial killer and Aryan Brotherhood member who confessed to six murders committed in Louisiana from 1978 to 1980. He was sentenced to death for the rape and murder of 18-year-old Faith Hathaway and was executed in 1984.

Sister Helen Prejean, a teacher and one of the Sisters of Saint Joseph of Medaille from New Orleans, began to write to him and later served as his spiritual adviser. In her book Dead Man Walking (1993), she explored her experiences with men on death row and the basis for her growing opposition to the death penalty. The book was adapted as a 1995 film of the same name, starring Susan Sarandon and Sean Penn. The book was also adapted as an opera, first produced by the San Francisco Opera in 2000.

== Background ==
Willie was the son of John Kelton Willie Jr and Elizabeth Oalman of Covington, and had four brothers. In interviews, he recounted a life filled with drugs, alcoholism and violence. Willie's mother said he had a ninth-grade education and left home when he was 16 after he started using drugs.

Willie's father, John Willie, served 27 years at the Louisiana State Penitentiary for a number of crimes. In 1954, he went to prison for cattle theft. He went back to prison for aggravated battery and violating his parole. In 1964, John was returned to prison once more with a life sentence for second degree murder. He was released from prison in 1972 after his sentence was commuted to 10 years, but he went back to prison for aggravated battery and was released for the last time in October 1983.

Wille was a member of the Aryan Brotherhood. He expressed admiration for Adolf Hitler, telling a newspaper, "I don't admire him for killing people or being what he was, but admire his ideas to advance in the world."

== Crimes ==
On May 23, 1978, Willie and his cousin, Perry Wayne Taylor, beat and drowned 19-year-old Dennis Buford Hemby, and then stole his marijuana.

On May 28, 1980, Willie and Joseph Jesse Vaccaro picked up Faith Hathaway, who was walking home after celebrating with friends the night before she was to enter the U.S. Army. They drove her to a remote area, raped her, and stabbed her to death. They left her body at Frickes Cave, a borrow pit, south of the parish seat Franklinton, Louisiana, along Highway 25 and near the Bogue Chitto River.

Three days later, on May 31, 1980, the pair kidnapped 20-year-old Mark Allen Brewster and his girlfriend, 16-year-old Debbie Cuevas, both from Madisonville. The two were forced to drive to Alabama, and Cuevas was repeatedly raped throughout the kidnapping. In Alabama, Brewster was taken out of the car and tied to a tree. Willie and Vaccaro shot him twice in the head and slashed his throat before leaving him for dead. Brewster survived his injuries, but was partially paralyzed. Reports vary, but he was either paralyzed on his right side or paralyzed from the waist down. Cuevas was then driven back to Louisiana, where Vaccaro raped her. Willie and Vaccaro then drove to the trailer home of Tommy Holden. Holden made sexual advances on Cuevas but panicked when she told him that she'd been kidnapped and raped. Willie and Vaccaro had been planning to kill Cuevas, but Holden talked them into releasing her.

== Trial ==
Because Willie and Vaccaro had taken Brewster and Cuevas across state lines from Louisiana to Alabama, the crime became a federal case under the Federal Kidnapping Act. They both pleaded guilty to conspiracy to two counts of kidnapping and one count of conspiracy to kidnapping and received three consecutive life sentences. During his trial, Willie mocked Cuevas by blowing kisses at her and drawing his finger across his throat. Holden faced state charges for being an accessory and hanged himself shortly after the trial.

In court, Willie presented a hard case, saying he had enjoyed raping Hathaway. Cuevas testified in court against him. At the trials, Willie and Vaccaro presented disputing accounts as to which man had what role in the crimes. Willie was convicted of the kidnapping, rape, and murder of Hathaway and sentenced to death. Elizabeth Oalman, who'd helped her son evade the police, pleaded guilty to being an accessory after the fact and served one year of a 5-year sentence.

A juror who was removed from consideration for the Willie trial due to her stated opposition to capital punishment was seated for the Vaccaro trial when she said she was fine with it. This juror became the sole vote against a death sentence for Vaccaro, and as Louisiana law requires successful votes for capital punishment to be unanimous, Vaccaro instead got a life sentence under state law. In total, Vaccaro received two life sentences for the murder of Hathaway and the kidnapping of Cuevas & Brewster. Vaccaro served his sentence at the United States Penitentiary in Fort Leavenworth, Kansas, and died in prison on January 22, 2008, at the age of 55.

It was later revealed that Willie had pleaded guilty in his federal kidnapping case in an attempt to avoid execution in Louisiana. He believed the state wouldn't be able to execute him if he was already in federal custody. However, federal authorities said they could transfer Willie. In 1983, he was transferred from USP Marion to the Louisiana State Penitentiary.

After their murder trials, Willie and Vaccaro stood trial for aggravated rape, aggravated kidnapping, and attempted murder. After Cuevas was forced to testify about how she was kidnapped and raped for a second time, Willie and Vaccaro pleaded guilty and said "Yeah, we're guilty. We just wanted to put y'all through this." They received four additional life sentences.

While on death row, Willie pleaded to second degree murder for killing Dennis Hemby and received a life sentence. His accomplice, Perry Wayne Taylor, pleaded guilty to manslaughter and received a 21-year sentence. In addition, Willie confessed to participating in the murder of 25-year-old St. Tammany Parish Deputy Sheriff Louis Wagner II on June 3, 1978. He implicated three other men, Richard A. Lott, Perry O. Phillips Jr., and Bobby K Raney. Wagner was allegedly killed as retaliation for repeatedly arresting one of the four men. The four men were charged with murder, but the charges against the others were dropped after Willie recanted and said the others had nothing to do with the murder. He pleaded guilty to second degree murder and received another life sentence. Willie allegedly recanted that others were involved after his father told him he'd violated the code of honor among criminals by being a snitch.

In May 1984, serial killers Henry Lee Lucas and Ottis Toole confessed to killing Wagner. Willie then recanted completely, saying he'd only confessed to Wagner's murder so he could stay in the St. Tammany Parish Jail since he thought it was easier to escape from. They were charged with murder shortly after Willie's execution, but a grand jury declined to indict them. It was later found that Lucas and Toole could not have been involved in Wagner's murder.

Willie also claimed to have killed two other men. One of the alleged victims was a hitchhiker, but no other details were given. The other was a male brick truck driver who Willie said he robbed in St. Tammany Parish. He said he hadn't planned on killing the man but ran him over after he threw a brick through Willie's windshield. He said he disposed of the body in a pond along the interstate.

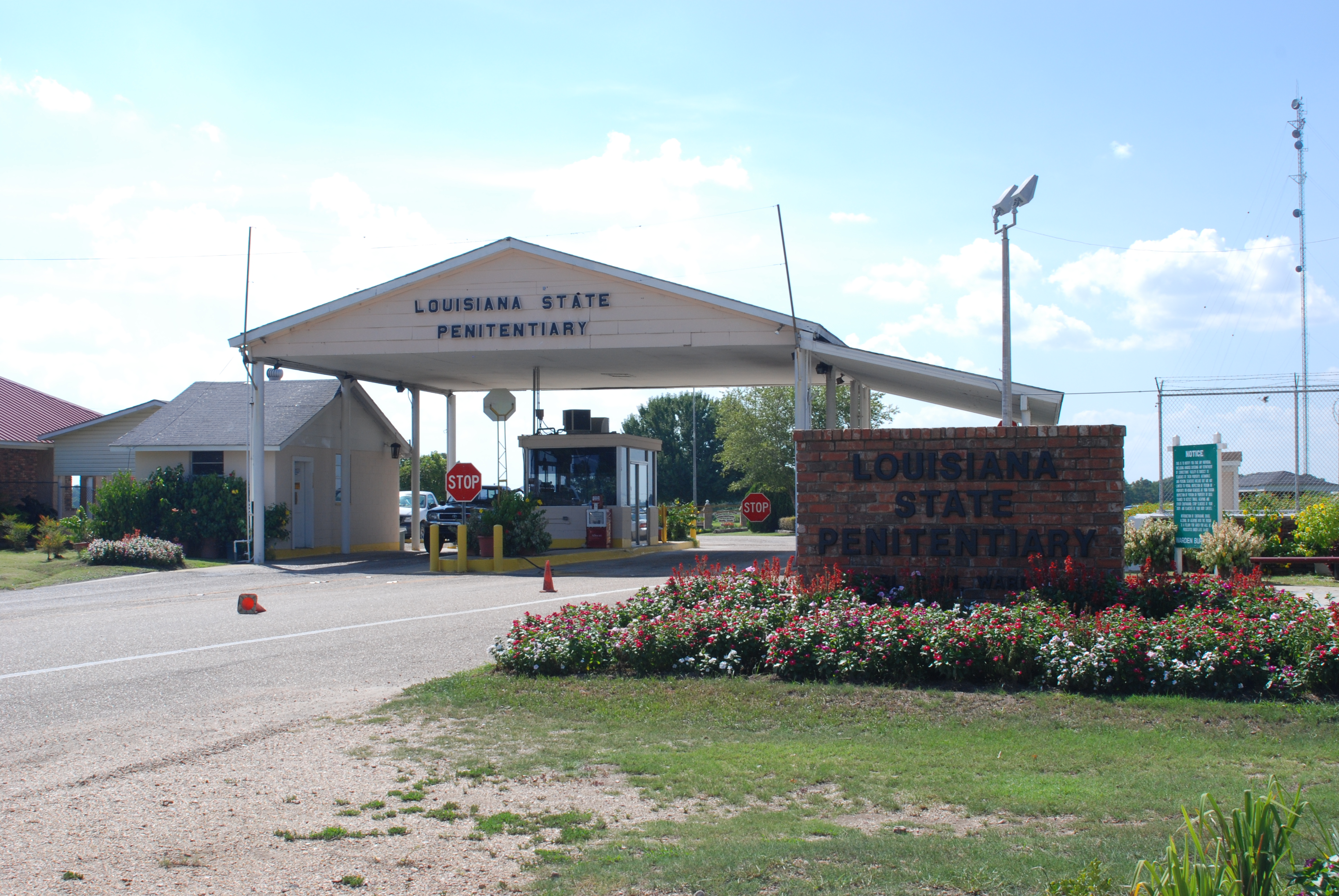
Louisiana State Penitentiary, where Willie was confined and executed

== Death row ==
In 1982, Sister Helen Prejean began to write to Willie at the request of the prison chaplain. A teacher in New Orleans, she was one of the Sisters of Saint Joseph of Medaille and had acted as spiritual adviser to another inmate on death row.

Willie was held on death row pending his execution, as appeals made their way through the courts. As was customary for such inmates, he was isolated socially and unable to work or participate in prison programs. After some time, Sister Prejean began to visit him and became his spiritual adviser. As she recounted in a book (see below), she worked to acknowledge him as a human being, help him acknowledge his crimes, and reconcile with God.

== Execution ==
During Willie's clemency hearing, his mother begged the state board of pardons to spare him. "Robert was a good boy," said Elizabeth Oalman. "He was always helping around the house, cutting grass. You know, he'd cut the yards. He'd make money to go the show and stuff. Robert didn't see his father when he was growing up." The board unanimously voted against recommending clemency.

Shortly before Robert Willie's execution, John Willie said his son deserved to die and that Vaccaro should be executed as well. "If a man did me wrong I'd have no problem with killing him like I’d kill that chicken out there," he said. "But I could never do anything to a hurt a woman a child or a young person." When Faith's parents, Vernon and Elizabeth Harvey, went to John's home and asked him if he believed in capital punishment, he said he was willing to pull the switch himself.

Robert Willie's grandfather Kelton Willie, a former sheriff, also said his grandson most likely deserved to die. "It's like her life was precious to her and he took it and they ought to take his life," Kelton Willie, said.

Vernon Harvey admitted that he'd twice considered killing Willie during the trial. "In the courtroom during his second sentencing trial, a deputy sheriff was standing less than two feet in front of me with his unstrapped, holstered .357 Magnum pistol," he said. "I thought about stepping up and grabbing it, but there were other people too close to Willie." said Harvey. On the other occasion, Vernon said he saw federal marshals driving Willie and considered ramming the car. "I contemplated ramming the car and trying to push it into the lake, but then I figured those federal marshals hadn't done me any wrong," he said.

Willie was executed on December 28, 1984, five days before his 27th birthday. He was the sixth man in Louisiana to be executed in a 13-month period. Willie asked Sister Prejean to be with him the day of the execution; he was also visited by his mother and brothers. Sister Prejean attended the execution at his request; he winked at her before he died.

Christopher Buchanan of PBS stated that different parties had different interpretations of what the wink meant, with Varnado (the Deputy Sheriff who investigated the murder) and the Harvey family interpreting it as, in Buchanan's words, "defiance and contempt" while Prejean interpreted it as having, also in the words of Buchanan, "transcended the reality of his execution" with him thinking of "love and being at peace". Willie's last meal consisted of fried fish, oysters, shrimp, french fries, and a salad. Prior to his execution, he said to Hathaway's mother and stepfather, Elizabeth and Vern Harvey, who were there as witnesses, "I hope you get some relief from my death. Killing people is wrong. That's why you've put me to death. It makes no difference whether it's citizens, countries, or governments. Killing is wrong."

Willie was the 32nd person executed in the United States since 1977. As of February 2018, Willie's execution is the only one successfully carried out in the post-Furman era between Christmas and New Year.

Debbie Cuevas recounts in her book that Willie never felt remorse: "Did he show any real remorse before he died?" I asked ... [Helen Prejean] shook her head sadly. "No. And you know, Debbie, I'm not sure he was capable of that."

== Aftermath ==
Feeling that victims' families were overlooked in the criminal justice system, the Harveys founded a group, Parents of Murdered Children, to help others. They have worked to ensure that families are given more information about court proceedings as well. They have continued to support capital punishment.

Sister Prejean wrote a non-fiction book Dead Man Walking (1993) about her encounters with Willie and Elmo Patrick Sonnier, the first convicted murderer for whom she had served as spiritual adviser, and with personnel in the prison system. She explored the effects of holding people on death row and being involved in executions for guards, chaplains and other officials. She has become an advocate to abolish capital punishment. Her book was adapted for a 1995 film of the same name, starring Susan Sarandon and Sean Penn. The character Matthew Poncelet, played by Penn in the film, and his crime, were drawn from Willie and Sonnier. The book was also adapted as an opera by the same name, first produced in 2000 by the San Francisco Opera.

Debbie Cuevas, now Debbie Morris, later married and had a son and a daughter. She eventually forgave both Willie and Vaccaro for their crimes against her. In a memoir, Forgiving the Dead Man Walking: Only One Woman Can Tell the Entire Story (Zondervan Publishing, 2000), she tells of her spiritual journey. After her book was published, Morris began writing to Vaccaro in prison. Through this period, Morris also established a friendship with Sister Prejean. Morris opposes capital punishment. She has said in her book that she believed her testimony contributed to Willie's being sentenced to death and executed.

Michael L. Varnado, the detective in the case of Faith Hathaway wrote Victims of the Dead Man Walking (Pelican Publishing, 2003) recounting his views on the case.

== See also ==
- List of people executed in Louisiana
- List of people executed in the United States in 1984
- List of serial killers in the United States
