= Helen Prejean =

American Catholic nun and advocate (born 1939)

Sister Helen Prejean CSJ
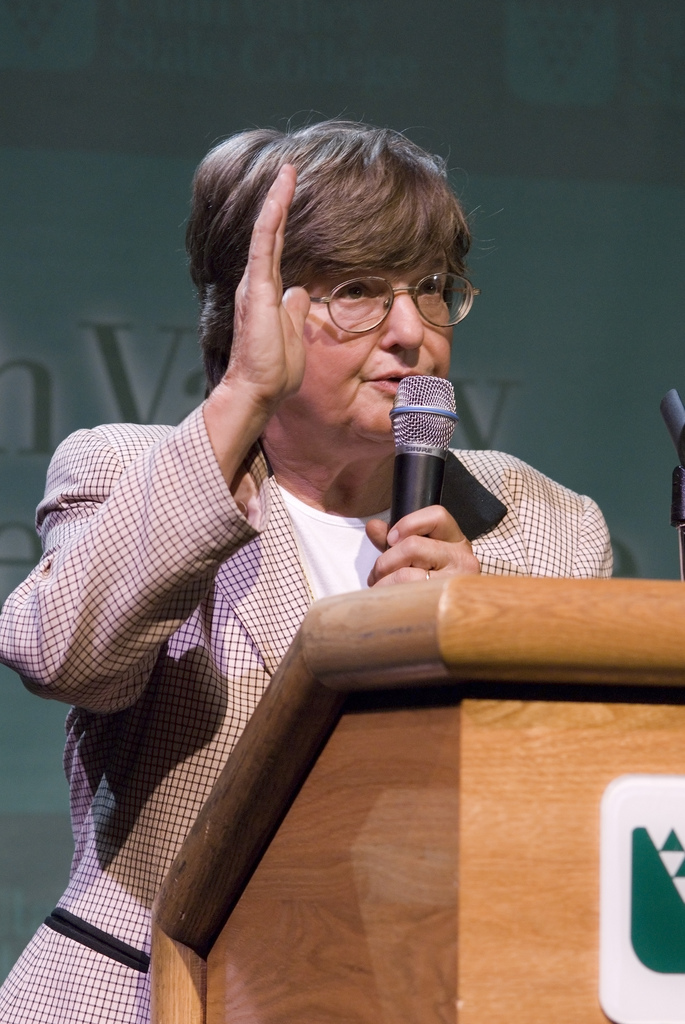
- Prejean in 2006
- Born: April 21, 1939 (age 87); Baton Rouge, Louisiana, U.S.
- Education: St. Mary's Dominican College; Saint Paul University
- Occupations: Sister, spiritual adviser, author, anti-death penalty activist, teacher

Helen Prejean (/preɪˈʒɑːn/ pray-ZHAHN; born April 21, 1939) is an American Catholic religious sister and a leading advocate for the abolition of the death penalty.

She is known for her best-selling book Dead Man Walking (1993) based on her experiences with two convicts on death row for whom she served as spiritual adviser before their executions. In her book, she explored the effects of the death penalty on everyone involved. The book was adapted as a 1995 film of the same name, starring Susan Sarandon as Prejean and Sean Penn; for her role, Sarandon won the Academy Award for Best Actress. It was also adapted as an opera by Jake Heggie and Terrence McNally, first produced in 2000 by the San Francisco Opera.

Prejean served as the National Chairperson of the National Coalition to Abolish the Death Penalty from 1993 to 1995. She helped establish The Moratorium Campaign, seeking an end to executions and conducting education on the death penalty. Prejean also founded the group SURVIVE to help families of victims of murder and related crimes.

== Early life and education ==
Helen Prejean was born in Baton Rouge, Louisiana, the daughter of Augusta Mae (née Bourg; 1911–1993), a nurse, and Louis Sebastian Prejean (1893–1974), a lawyer. She joined the Sisters of Saint Joseph of Medaille in 1957.

In 1962, she received a Bachelor of Arts in English and Education from St. Mary's Dominican College, New Orleans, Louisiana. In 1973, she earned a Master of Arts in religious education from Saint Paul University, a Pontifical university federated with the University of Ottawa. She has been the Religious Education Director at St. Frances Cabrini Parish in New Orleans, the Formation Director for the Sisters of Saint Joseph of Medaille, and has taught junior and senior high school.

== Death row ministry ==
Her efforts began in New Orleans, Louisiana, in 1981. In 1982 an acquaintance asked her to correspond with convicted murderer Elmo Patrick Sonnier, held on death row in the Louisiana State Penitentiary, known as Angola. Sonnier had been sentenced to death by electrocution. She visited Sonnier in prison and agreed to be his spiritual adviser in the months leading up to his execution. The experience gave Prejean greater insight into the process involved in executions, for the convict, families, and others in the prison, and she began speaking out against capital punishment. At the same time, she founded Survive, an organization devoted to counseling the families of victims of violence.

Prejean has since ministered to other inmates on death row and witnessed several more executions. She served as National Chairperson of the National Coalition to Abolish the Death Penalty from 1993 to 1995.

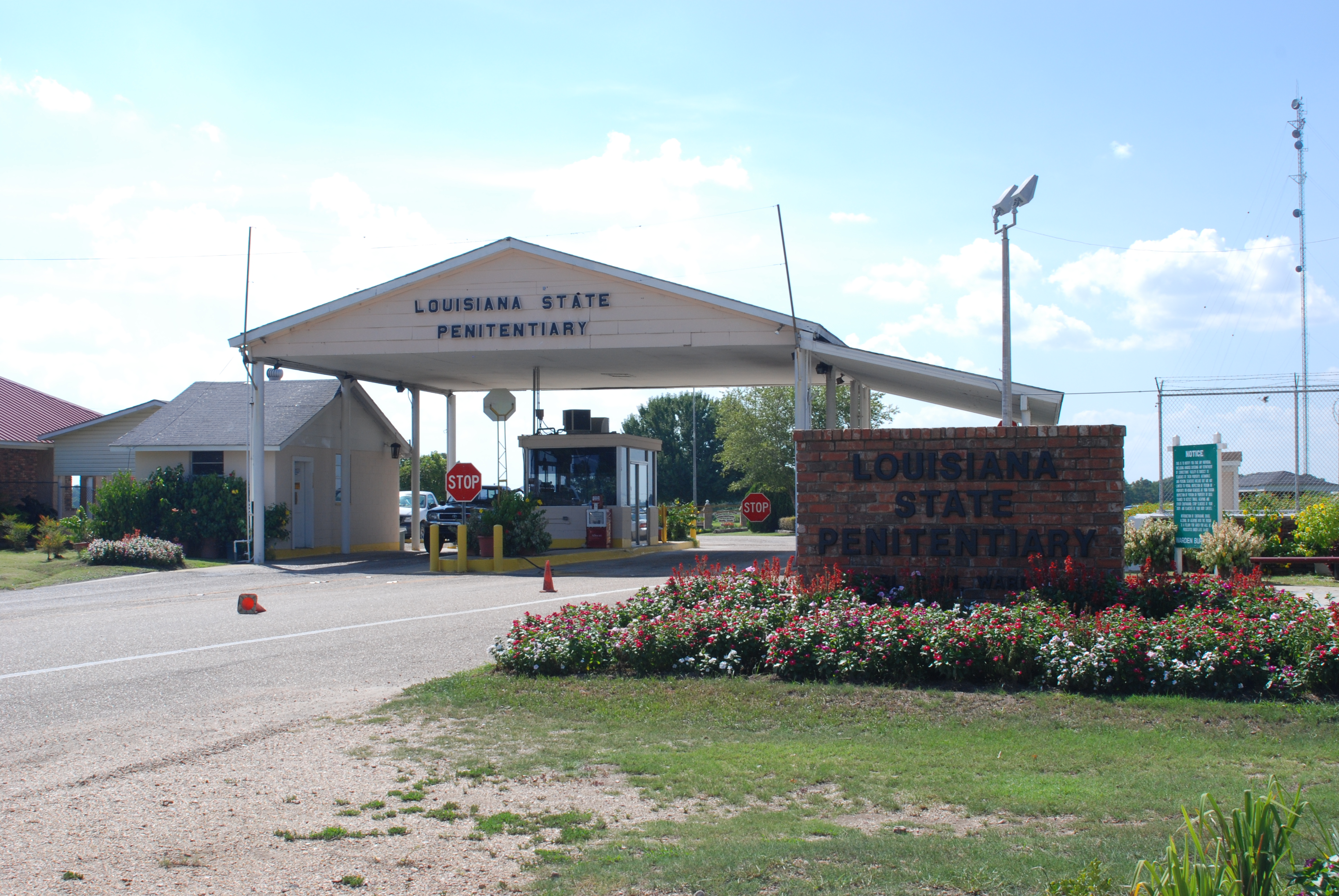
Louisiana State Penitentiary, where Sonnier was incarcerated.

== Dead Man Walking ==
In 1993, Prejean published Dead Man Walking, an account of her relationship with Sonnier and other inmates on death row, and the factors related to her growing opposition to the death penalty. The book was adapted for a 1995 feature film of the same name; Prejean was portrayed by Susan Sarandon.

The book was adapted as an opera of the same name, first produced by the San Francisco Opera in 2000. The libretto is by Terrence McNally and the music composed by Jake Heggie. It has also been adapted as a play of the same name, which was first produced in autumn 2003.

For her book, Prejean drew from her experiences with Sonnier and with the convict Robert Lee Willie, who had been sentenced to death after being convicted of kidnapping and murder in two attacks in May 1980. The book also explored the effects that conducting the death penalty has on attorneys, prison guards, other prison officials, as well as the families of both convicted murderers and their victims. Since then Prejean has worked with other men sentenced to death.

In December 2010, Prejean donated all of her archival papers to DePaul University.

== Campaigns, book, and awards ==
In 1996, Prejean was awarded the Laetare Medal by the University of Notre Dame, the oldest and most prestigious award for American Catholics.

In 1999, Prejean formed Moratorium 2000, a petition drive that eventually grew into a national education effort called The Moratorium Campaign, which sought to bring about a moratorium on executions. It was initially staffed by Robert Jones, Theresa Meisz, and Jené O'Keefe. The organization Witness to Innocence, composed of death row survivors who were exonerated after being convicted for crimes they did not commit, was started under The Moratorium Campaign.

Prejean wrote a second book, The Death of Innocents: An Eyewitness Account of Wrongful Executions (2004). She tells of two men, Dobie Gillis Williams and Joseph O'Dell, whom she accompanied to their executions. She believes that both men were innocent of the crimes for which they were convicted. The book also examines the recent history of death penalty decisions by the Supreme Court of the United States and the record of George W. Bush as Governor of Texas.

In 1998, Prejean was given the Pacem in Terris Award, named after a 1963 encyclical letter by Pope John XXIII that calls on all people of good will to secure peace among all nations. Pacem in terris is Latin for "Peace on Earth."

Prejean now bases her work at the Ministry Against the Death Penalty in New Orleans. She gives talks about the issues across the United States and around the world. She and her sister Mary Ann Antrobus have also been deeply involved at a center in Nicaragua called Friends of Batahola.

In 2019, Prejean published a memoir titled River of Fire: My Spiritual Journey. In the book she discusses her personal spiritual journey that led her to engage in social justice work.

== Awards and recognition ==
Prejean has given commencement addresses to more than 50 colleges and universities around the world.

- 2022: Saint Vincent de Paul Award from DePaul University
- 2019: Blessed are the Peacemakers Award from Catholic Theological Union
- 2016: Cardinal Joseph Bernardin Award from the Catholic Common Ground Initiative, housed at Catholic Theological Union
- 2013: Robert M. Holstein "Faith Doing Justice" Award from the Ignatian Solidarity Network
- 2006: Christopher Award
- 2002: NUI Galway Honorary Doctorate (LLD)
- 1998: World Pacem in Terris Award
- 1996: Pax Christi USA Pope Paul VI Teacher of Peace Award
- 1996: Laetare Medal
