= Elmo Patrick Sonnier =

Convicted murderer

- Born: February 21, 1950; Saint Martinville, Louisiana, U.S.
- Died: April 5, 1984 (aged 34); Louisiana State Penitentiary, Louisiana, U.S.
- Resting place: Roselawn Memorial Park
- Status: Executed by electrocution
- Conviction: First degree murder (2 counts)
- Penalty: Death
- Accomplice: Eddie James Sonnier

Details
- Victims: 2
- Date: November 5, 1977
- Location: Iberia Parish, Louisiana
- Weapon: 22-caliber rifle
- Date apprehended: December 5, 1977

Elmo Patrick "Pat" Sonnier (February 21, 1950 – April 5, 1984) was a convicted American murderer and rapist in Louisiana who was executed by electrocution at Louisiana State Penitentiary in Louisiana on April 5, 1984. Sonnier was sentenced to death on April 25, 1978, for the November 5, 1977, rape and murder of Loretta Ann Bourque, 18, and the murder of David LeBlanc, 17. Sonnier's younger brother, Eddie, was sentenced to life in prison.

Sister Helen Prejean was asked to write to death row inmates as part of her Order's community outreach program and wrote to Sonnier. She became his spiritual adviser and eventually wrote Dead Man Walking (1993) about her experience and her belief that the death penalty was morally wrong.

== Crimes ==
On November 4, 1977, 17-year-old David LeBlanc and his 18-year-old girlfriend Loretta Ann Bourque attended the Homecoming football game at Catholic High School in Iberia Parish, Louisiana. After the game, the couple drove to an isolated area in St. Martin Parish, a type of lovers' lane. At around 1 a.m., the couple was approached by two men, 27-year-old Elmo Patrick "Pat" Sonnier and his younger brother, 20-year-old Eddie James Sonnier. The brothers had been in the area hunting rabbits and were armed with 22-caliber rifles.

The Sonniers identified themselves as police officers and presented a badge that one of the brothers had acquired while working as a security guard. The brothers entered LeBlanc's car. They told the couple that they were trespassing on private property and were under arrest. The brothers took LeBlanc's and Bourque's driver's licenses, handcuffed the couple, and moved them to the back seat. They then told the couple that they were going to drive them to the home of the land's owner to see if the owner wished to press trespassing charges.

The Sonniers drove the couple to an oilfield in Iberia Parish and parked by the road. They handcuffed LeBlanc to a tree in a nearby wooded area. They took Bourque from the car and Elmo raped her. The brothers told her they would release both her and LeBlanc unharmed if she had sex with Eddie James Sonnier. Bourque agreed. Afterward, the brothers took the couple back to the car and removed their handcuffs. Elmo Sonnier decided against releasing them, as he feared the couple would report the incident and he would be reincarcerated at Angola. The brothers forced the couple to lie face down in a ditch and fatally shot them several times.

The brothers returned LeBlanc's car to St. Martin Parish. When they reached Elmo's 1961 Dodge Dart, they discovered they had a flat tire. They used a jack from LeBlanc's car to change their tire. The jack was later found in Elmo Sonnier's car. The following day, the brothers disposed of LeBlanc's and Bourque's driver's licenses and buried the weapons they used in the killings.

== Arrests ==
The Sonnier brothers were arrested on December 5, 1977. Elmo voluntarily confessed to police that he abducted LeBlanc and Bourque, raped Bourque, and killed both. He made a second statement admitting his guilt while being transported to jail, and a third confession the following day. Police searched his home, where they found handcuffs in his bedroom that had been used to restrain LeBlanc and Bourque. They also found LeBlanc's car jack in Elmo's car. Later they discovered the buried guns that had been used in the murders. A bullet from one of the victims matched the guns, which belonged to the Sonnier brothers; another match was made from casings found at the crime scene. Police located a witness who saw Elmo Sonnier's car in St. Martin Parish.

Both brothers were indicted on two counts of first degree murder. Elmo Sonnier entered a plea of not guilty and not guilty by reason of insanity.

== Trial and conviction ==
During the trial, the brothers traded accusations as to who did the killings (under Louisiana law, any person who participates in the killing of another human being may be subject to the death penalty, but the extent of participation may be considered when imposing the penalty). They were said to have been under the influence of drugs when they committed the crimes.

On April 25, 1978, both Elmo and Eddie Sonnier were convicted of first-degree murder and condemned to death. After their first appeal, the court reversed their death sentences due to procedural errors. New sentencing hearings were scheduled. During his brother's second penalty hearing, Eddie James Sonnier recanted his previous testimony, claiming that he was responsible for the killings, not his brother. He also sent a letter to Governor Edwin W. Edwards asserting the same position.

The prosecution attacked the younger brother's credibility, establishing Elmo Sonnier's lead in the crimes and responsibility for the murders. The state of Louisiana again sentenced Elmo to death, while Eddie Sonnier was sentenced to life imprisonment without the possibility of parole.

== Imprisonment ==
While on death row at Louisiana State Prison, Elmo Sonnier was contacted by an outreach effort setting up communication with inmates on death row. Sister Helen Prejean, a Catholic nun, was assigned to him. After they started a correspondence, she began to visit him and became his spiritual adviser. He was the first of several death row inmates whom she counseled. Sister Prejean subsequently became a nationally prominent anti–death penalty activist.

Sister Helen Prejean later said that the younger brother, Eddie Sonnier, was guilty of killing LeBlanc and Bourque. She claimed that Elmo was innocent but he felt guilt over his criminal past and for participating in the rape of not only Bourque, but other teenage girls at "lover's lane" who had come with their boyfriends. The two brothers had frequently posed as police officers and accosted such couples. They offered to let them go if the girl had sex with both brothers. Elmo told Prejean that he and his brother had pulled the same ruse the night they encountered LeBlanc and Bourque, but his brother lost control and killed the teens.

== Execution and burial ==
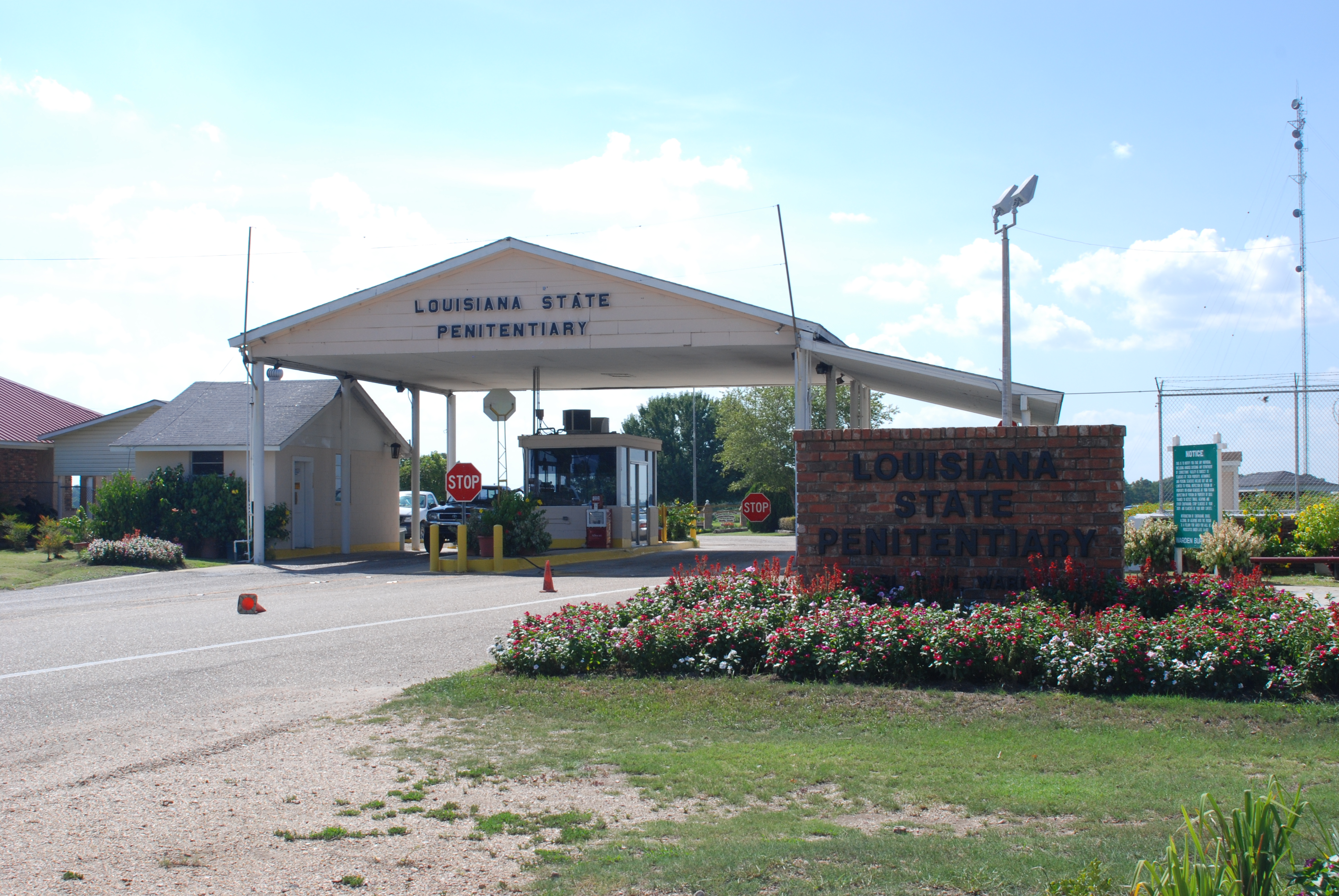
Louisiana State Penitentiary, where Sonnier was imprisoned and executed

Sonnier's execution date was set for April 5, 1984. On April 4, Sonnier's lawyer attempted to get a stay of execution from the United States Supreme Court, claiming that a former cellmate of Eddie Sonnier's had overheard him confess to the murders. The Supreme Court rejected the request.

Sister Helen Prejean, Elmo Sonnier's spiritual adviser, was permitted to visit with Sonnier during his final hours and to witness his execution. Godfrey Bourque and Lloyd LeBlanc, the fathers of Loretta Bourque and David LeBlanc, respectively, were also granted permission to witness the execution.

In the execution chamber, Sonnier directed his last statement to Lloyd LeBlanc, saying "I can understand the way you feel. I have no hatred in my heart. As I leave this world, I ask God to forgive ... me for what I did. I also ask your forgiveness for what I did." LeBlanc nodded, and then Bourque remarked quietly "He didn't ask me." Sonnier was strapped in what was known as "Gruesome Gertie", the state's oak electric chair. After electrical currents were administered, Elmo Patrick Sonnier was pronounced dead at 12:15 a.m.

Sr. Prejean and other Catholic nuns took responsibility to ensure a proper Catholic burial for Elmo Sonnier. The service, presided over by the bishop of Baton Rouge, Stanley Joseph Ott, was held at a Baton Rouge-area funeral home. Sonnier was buried in Roselawn Memorial Park, in a burial plot normally reserved for nuns.

Eddie James Sonnier died in December 2013 at the age of 57, after a short illness, at Louisiana State Penitentiary. He is buried in the prison cemetery. Eddie Sonnier's job was incinerating waste, and prison officials stated that he received an illness during his job duties. Jim Butler of Eunice Today stated that Eddie Sonnier was in "Obscurity", that is without attention from the public and press, when he died.

== In popular culture ==
Sister Helen Prejean published a book, Dead Man Walking (1993), about her relationship with Elmo Sonnier and Robert Lee Willie, another inmate on death row whom she counseled. The book was adapted as a 1995 film of the same name directed by Tim Robbins and starring Susan Sarandon as Sister Prejean and Sean Penn as Matthew Poncelet, an amalgam of Sonnier and Willie. Her book was also adapted as an opera of the same name, first produced in 2000 by the San Francisco Opera.

== See also ==
- List of people executed in Louisiana
- List of people executed in the United States in 1984

== Sources ==
- Elmo Patrick Sonnier. The Clark County Prosecuting Attorney. Retrieved on 2007-11-12.

Executions carried out in Louisiana
Preceded by Johnny Taylor Jr. February 29, 1984	Elmo Patrick Sonnier; April 5, 1984	Succeeded by Timothy Baldwin September 10, 1984
Executions carried out in the United States
Preceded by Ronald Clark O'Bryan – Texas March 31, 1984	Elmo Patrick Sonnier – Louisiana; April 5, 1984	Succeeded by Arthur Frederick Goode III – Florida April 5, 1984
