= Sisters of Saint Joseph of Medaille =

The Sisters of Saint Joseph of Medaille a.k.a. Congregation of the Sisters of St. Joseph of Bourg was a Roman Catholic congregation of women. Its forebear, the Congregation of Sisters of Saint Joseph was started in Le Puy, France by the Jesuit Jean Pierre Médaille and accepted by the bishop, Monsignor de Maupas, on October 15, 1650. The Congregation of Saint Joseph was disbanded during the French Revolution. It was revived in 1807 at Lyon, during the Napoleonic regime through the efforts of Cardinal Fesch and Mother Saint John Fontbonne. In 2007 the Sisters of Saint Joseph of Medaille merged with six other congregations to form a new congregation called the Congregation of Saint Joseph.

== History ==
In 1819 a foundation from the mother house in Lyon was established in the Diocese of Belley under the leadership of Mother Saint Joseph Chaney. In 1823 the sisters of the diocese formally separated from Lyon. They became a new independent diocesan congregation under the leadership of Reverend Mother Saint Benoit Cornillon and direction of Bishop Alexander Devie.

In 1854 Sisters were sent from the Sisters of St. Joseph of Bourg motherhouse in France to establish a house at Bay St. Louis, Mississippi, in the Diocese of Natchez. In 1863 a novitiate was opened at New Orleans. After establishing a central house in New Orleans, Louisiana, the Sisters extended their ministry to the poor and suffering of Louisiana and Mississippi, opening schools, hospitals and an orphanage. Sisters from the New Orleans group went to Cincinnati, Ohio, in 1893, where they created a boarding residence, known as the Sacred Heart Home, for young working women girls. It later became known as Fontbonne Home. In time, the sisters also undertook educational and other apostolic ministries in Ohio.

In 1903 six sisters were dispatched from Bourg, France to staff a school in Argyle, Minnesota. In 1907, the group in Argyle, Minnesota established a convent and school in Crookston, Minnesota In 1907 a convent was established at Superior, Wisconsin by seven Sisters from Cincinnati. The sisters soon staffed educational and health care institutions throughout the area, extending their presence in Minneapolis/St. Paul, and to Wisconsin, North Dakota, and Canada. By 1962, the Bourg Congregation had six provinces, three in Europe and three in the United States, with missions in Africa and Latin America.

By 1962, the Bourg Congregation had six provinces, three in Europe and three in the United States, with missions in Africa and Latin America. In July 1977, the six provinces voted to become two separate congregations, one based in Europe, the other in America. On November 30, 1977, Rome officially declared the three America provinces to be a new Congregation in the Church: the Sisters of Saint Joseph of Medaille. The name Medaille was chosen because it is the family name of the Jesuit priest who helped found the Sisters in 1650 and because the Sisters were geographically located in the north, central and southern areas of the United States. Sister Janet Roesener of Cincinnati, Ohio was chosen the first superior general.

In 1986 and in 1994 decisions were made to merge the three provinces into five regions headed by a Congregational Leadership Office composed of a president and three general councilors, in Cincinnati. The five regions consist of Baton Rouge, Cincinnati, Crookston, New Orleans, and the Twin Cities.

== Hurricane Katrina ==
The Sisters of St. Joseph had a mother-house on Mirabeau Avenue in New Orleans. The compound was flooded during the aftermath of Hurricane Katrina. The congregation used part of their retirement fund to stay afloat after Katrina. Besides Mirabeau, the sisters lost two of their three other New Orleans homes. Although not obligated to do so, the congregation chose to pay salaries and offer severance packages to their employees.

With estimated losses of $12.1 million, the sisters paid more than $1.4 million to clean and gut their chief residence, Mirabeau. As costs of the cleanup surpassed the amount of insurance received the property was to be put up for sale. In July 2006 Patricia Lefevere reported in the National Catholic Reporter that "If the 62-bedroom complex on 16 acres cannot be sold, the potential loss would be $9.6 million."

The Times-Picayune subsequently reported that the structure on Mirabeau Avenue was destroyed by a fire said by witnesses to have been caused by a lightning strike during a Summer thunderstorm. It was totally demolished following the fire.

== Merger ==
The merger of the Sisters of Saint Joseph of Medaille and six other Sisters of Saint Joseph congregations in the central United States was planned before the onset of Katrina. In 2007 the seven congregations joined to form a new congregation called the Congregation of Saint Joseph. The seven founding congregations are the Sisters of Saint Joseph of Wichita, Kansas; Cleveland, Ohio; LaGrange, Illinois; Tipton, Indiana; Nazareth, Michigan; Wheeling, West Virginia; and Medaille, with centers in Louisiana, Cincinnati and Minnesota. The new congregation numbered about 700 as of 2011.

The Congregation of St Joseph is a member of the Sisters of St. Joseph US Federation.

== Schools ==
Schools	Location	Gender	Established
St. Joseph's Academy	Cincinnati, Ohio	Women's	1915–1951
Archbishop McNicholas (formerly St. Joe's)	Cincinnati, Ohio	Co-Educational	1951–Present
St. Joseph's Academy (Baton Rouge)	Baton Rouge, Louisiana	Women's	1868–present

== Notable members ==
Sister Helen Prejean, author of Dead Man Walking

== See also ==
- Sisters of St. Joseph
