= Dead Man Walking (book) =

1993 book by Helen Prejean

- Author: Sister Helen Prejean, C.S.J.
- Publisher: Random House
- Publication date: 1993
- Pages: 278

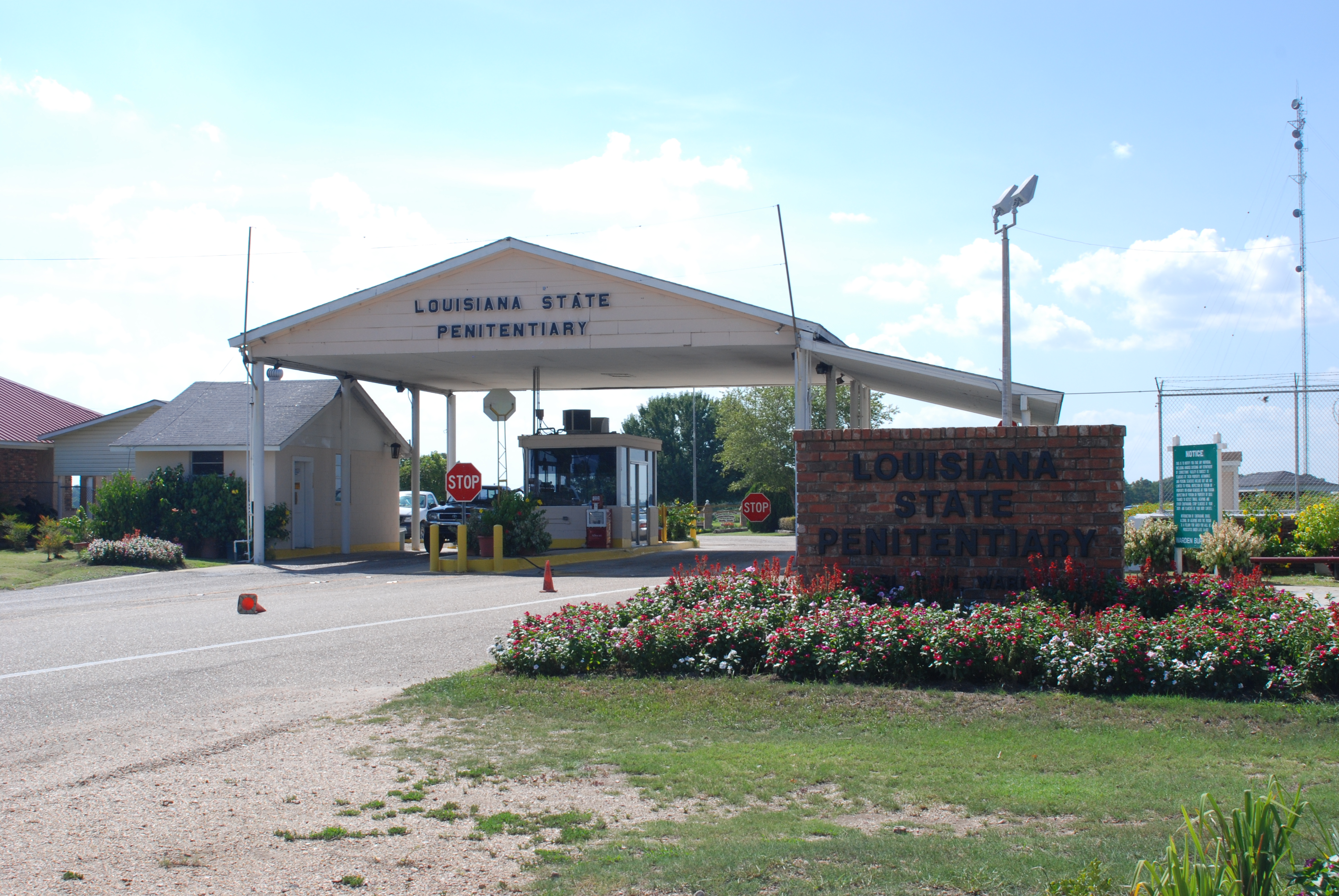
Louisiana State Penitentiary, the setting of the work

Dead Man Walking: An Eyewitness Account of the Death Penalty in the United States is a 1993 non-fiction book by Sister Helen Prejean, a Roman Catholic nun and one of the Sisters of Saint Joseph of Medaille based in New Orleans. Arising from her work as a spiritual adviser to two convicted murderers on death row, the book is set largely at the Louisiana State Penitentiary (Angola) in West Feliciana Parish, Louisiana. It examines moral issues related to the men's acknowledgement of their crimes and to the state's use of the death penalty.

== Background ==
Prejean has become a leading advocate for the abolition of capital punishment in the United States. Her campaign was initiated following her correspondence and visits that she maintained with two convicted murderers. She began this ministry in 1982. The first man was Elmo Patrick Sonnier, who was sentenced to death for the murder of a teenage couple. She visited Sonnier in prison and agreed to be his spiritual adviser in the months leading up to his execution in the electric chair. The second was Robert Lee Willie for whom she also served as spiritual adviser.

Prejean gained insight into the minds of the convicted murderers, the process involved in executions, and the effects on the prison guards and other personnel. She became convinced that the state's use of the death penalty was morally wrong and began speaking out against capital punishment. At the same time, she founded Survive, an organization devoted to providing counseling to the families of victims of violence.

== Name ==
The title of the book comes from a once-traditional phrase in American prisons to designate men who had been sentenced to death. They were held on what was known as death row and were deprived of most social contact and barred from work or participation in prison programs. Before the 1960s, when guards would lead a condemned man down the prison hallway, they would call out, "Dead man walking! Dead man walking here!" The origin of the phrase is unknown, although it may come from the title of an 1890 poem ("The Dead Man Walking") by Thomas Hardy about a person who turns into a corpse even when apparently alive. It may have been to warn other staff or prisoners to let them know that they should be on their guard since a death row prisoner has nothing to lose and could be violent. It may also have been a kind of honorific declamation, to let other prisoners know that they should move out of the way, death row prisoners being seen as an elite within the prison system. Alternatively, the call may have been a stigma attached to the condemned man, to remind others within earshot not to touch him to avoid catching his bad luck. In any case, its symbolism is clear: the condemned prisoner, in the eyes of the law, was dead already.

== Reception ==
The Washington Post said that the book "presents a profound argument against capital punishment. It never minimizes what criminals have done in the past but by emphasizing that they, too, remain children of God, challenges America to prevent more victims in the future," predicting that it "is destined to become the most influential anti–capital punishment statement since Albert Camus wrote 'Reflections on the Guillotine' in 1957."

== Adaptations ==
=== Film ===
In 1995, a film based on the book was made, starring Susan Sarandon and Sean Penn. The film was a critical and commercial success, and Sarandon won the Academy Award for Best Actress for her performance.

=== Opera ===
The book was adapted as an opera of the same name, composed by Jake Heggie with a libretto by playwright Terrence McNally. It premiered at the San Francisco Opera in October 2000. The international premiere of the opera was in August 2003, in Adelaide. It has been produced in several other cities, including by the Union Avenue Opera in St. Louis, Missouri. In November 2019, Lyric Opera of Chicago presented their premiere of the opera. It premiered at the Metropolitan Opera in September 2023.

=== Stage version of the book/film ===
Hoping to expand the influence of the book and her message, Sister Helen collaborated with director Tim Robbins to adapt the book into a stage play. According to the Catholic Mobilizing Network and the play's website, "Since the launch of the project in the fall of 2003, more than 250 high schools and colleges across the country have produced the play, conducted academic courses on the death penalty, and brought the issue to life on their campuses through art, music, and public education and action events."
