= Congregation of the Sisters of St. Joseph of Bourg =

The Congregation of the Sisters of St. Joseph of Bourg grew out of the Congregation of the Sisters of St. Joseph of Lyon which had been disbanded during the French Revolution. The Sisters of Saint Joseph was revived as a congregation in 1807 at Lyons, during the Napoleonic regime through the efforts of Mother Saint John Fontbonne. In 1819 a daughter house was established in Bourg, which became an independent congregation in 1823. In 1977 the United States provinces of the Bourg congregation separated to form the Sisters of Saint Joseph of Medaille. In 1996 the Bourg congregation re-joined the founding congregation of Lyon, as part of the latter's European Province.

== History ==
=== Congregation of the Sisters of Saint Joseph of Lyon ===
The Congregation of Saint Joseph is a Roman Catholic order of women founded in Le Puy, France by the Jesuit Jean-Pierre Médaille and accepted by the bishop, Monsignor de Maupas, on October 15, 1650. The Congregation of the Sisters of Saint Joseph was disbanded during the French Revolution, but The revived in 1807 at Lyons, during the Napoleonic regime through the efforts of Cardinal Fesch and the devotedness of Mother Saint John Fontbonne.

=== Congregation of the Sisters of St. Joseph of Bourg ===
In 1819 a foundation from the mother house in Lyons was established in the Diocese of Belley under the leadership of Mother Saint Joseph Chaney. In 1823 the sisters of the diocese formally separated from Lyons. They became a new independent diocesan congregation under the leadership of Reverend Mother Saint Benoit Cornillon and direction of Bishop Alexander Devie.

In 1854 sisters were sent from Bourg to establish a house at Bay St. Louis, Mississippi, in the Diocese of Natchez. In 1863 a novitiate was opened at New Orleans. After establishing a central house in New Orleans, Louisiana, the Sisters extended their ministry to the poor and suffering of Louisiana and Mississippi, opening schools, hospitals and an orphanage.

In 1893, Sisters from the New Orleans group went to Cincinnati, Ohio. They created a boarding residence for working girls known as the in Sacred Heart Home. It later became known as the Fontbonne. As they became established, the community established educational institutions. children and young women under their care.

In 1903, sisters from the motherhouse in Bourg were sent to Argyle, Minnesota. In 1907, the group in Argyle, Minnesota established a convent and school in Crookston, Minnesota. In 1907 a convent was established at Superior, Wisconsin by seven sisters from Cincinnati. Schools were also opened among the French Canadians in Minnesota and Wisconsin

By 1962, the Bourg Congregation had six provinces, three in Europe (Bourg, Switzerland and Belgium), and three in the United States, with missions in Africa and Latin America.

==== Sisters of Saint Joseph of Medaille ====
In July 1977, the six provinces voted to become two separate congregations, one based in Europe, the other in America. On November 30, 1977, Rome officially declared the three America provinces to be a new Congregation in the Church: the Sisters of Saint Joseph of Medaille. The name Medaille was chosen because it is the family name of the Jesuit priest who helped found the Sisters in 1650 and because the Sisters were geographically located in the north, central and southern areas of the United States. Sister Janet Roesener of Cincinnati, Ohio was chosen the first superior general.

In 1986 and in 1994 decisions were made to merge the three provinces into five regions headed by a Congregational Leadership Office composed of a president and three general councilors, in Cincinnati. The five regions are Baton Rouge, Cincinnati, Crookston, New Orleans, and the Twin Cities.

===== Training =====
The formation begins with a nine-month postulancy followed by a two-year novitiate. During the postulancy and the second year of novitiate, an integrated liberal arts college program is simultaneously initiated with a thorough spiritual foundation. After the first profession, the first level of education is completed before entering into the apostolate.

== Merger ==
In 1996 the Congregation of the Sisters of St. Joseph of Bourg and that of Bordeaux merged with their founding congregation to form the European Province of the Sisters of St. Joseph of Lyon.

== See also ==
- Sisters of St. Joseph
