= St. Joseph's College School =

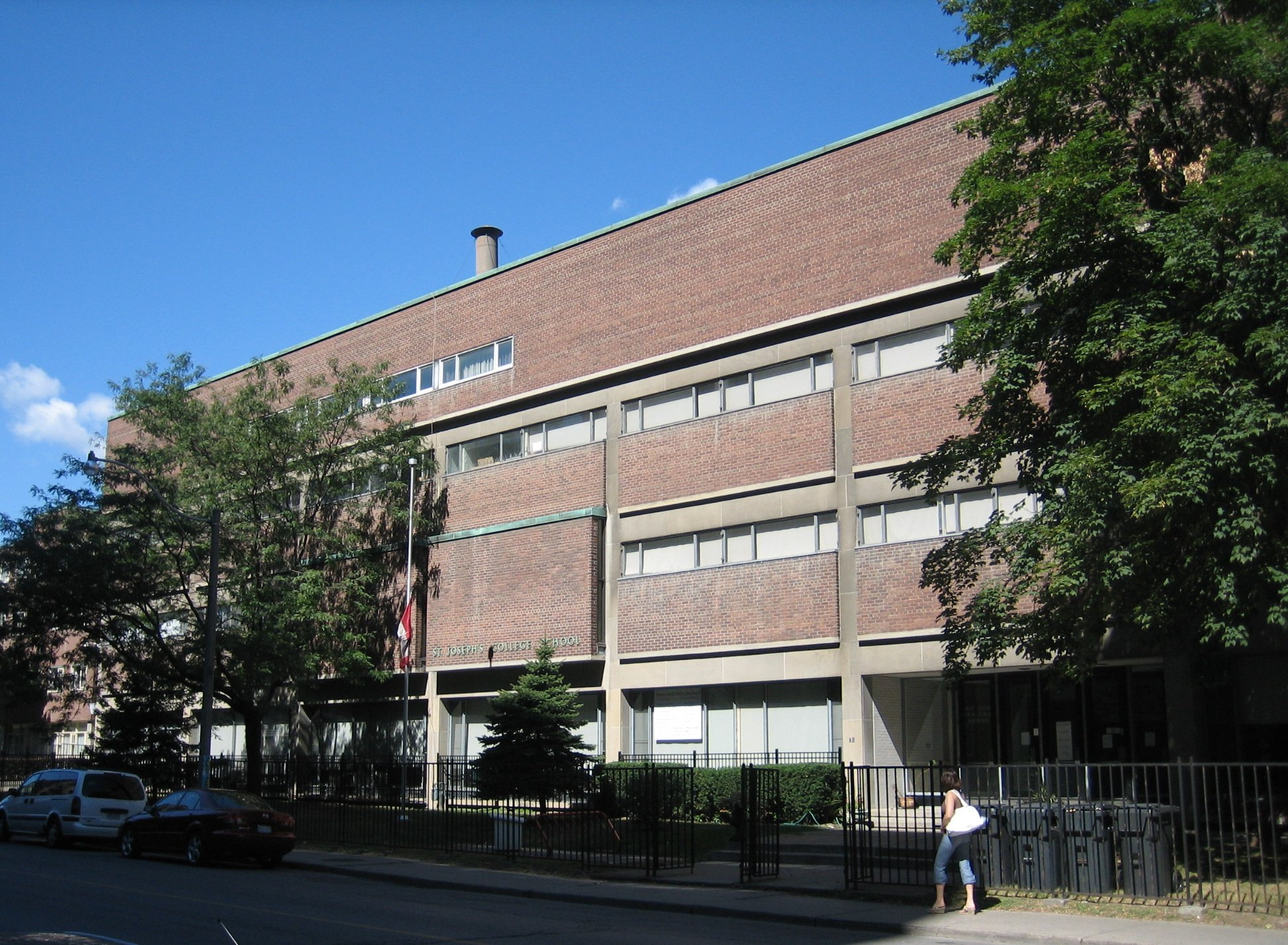

Location
- 74 Wellesley Street West; Discovery District, Toronto, Ontario, M5C 1C4; Canada; 43.664357°N 79.388838°W

Information
- Former names: St. Joseph’s Academy for Young Ladies (1854–1863); St. Joseph’s College School, a Boarding and Day School for the Higher and Primary Education of Young Ladies and Little Girls (1863–1912); St. Joseph's College Academy (1912–1928)
- School type: Catholic High school
- Motto: Congregavit nos in unum Christi amor (The love of Christ has gathered us together into one)
- Religious affiliations: Roman Catholic (Sisters of St. Joseph)
- Established: 1854
- School board: Toronto Catholic District School Board (Metropolitan Separate School Board)
- Superintendent: Kimberly Dixon; Area 6
- Area trustee: Norm Di Pasquale; Ward 9
- School number: 514 / 814954
- Principal: Jennifer Correia
- Faculty: 50
- Enrolment: 808 (2017-18)
- Campus: Urban
- Colours: Gold and Blue
- Mascot: Josie the Bear
- Team name: St. Joe's Bears
- Parish: St. Basil's
- Specialist High Skills Major: Health and Wellness & Business
- Program Focus: Gifted, Extended French, Healthcare SHSM, & Business SHSM
- Website: www.tcdsb.org/o/stjosephcollege

St. Joseph's College School (St. Joseph's College, SJCS, St. Joe's, or more colloquially known as St. Joe's Wellesley), originally known as St. Joseph's Academy for Young Ladies is an all girls Catholic high school in downtown Toronto, Ontario, Canada. Since 1987, the school has been operated by the Toronto Catholic District School Board (formerly the Metropolitan Separate School Board).

Founded in 1854 by the Sisters of St. Joseph, it turned 150 years old in the school year 2004-2005 and turned 160 years old in the school year 2014–2015. In the year 2010–2011, the Fraser Institute ranked St. Joseph's College amongst the top 5% of Ontario schools.

== History and tradition ==
St. Joseph's College School was founded by the Sisters of St. Joseph of Toronto in 1854, three years after the first nuns from the order came to the city. The roots of the Congregation began in LePuy, France, when the Sisters of St. Joseph was established in 1648 by a French Jesuit named Jean Paul Médaille.

Originally called “St. Joseph’s Academy for Young Ladies,” the name was changed to “St. Joseph’s College School, a Boarding and Day School for the Higher and Primary Education of Young Ladies and Little Girls” when the school moved to Bay and St. Alban's Street in 1863.

St. Joseph's College has a history of promoting girls’ and women's education. In 1911, the school requested to be affiliated with the University of Toronto—a request the then-president of the university, Sir Robert Falconer, granted. St. Joseph's was officially tied to St. Michael's College, the Roman Catholic college of the University of Toronto, in 1912 becoming "St. Joseph College Academy". This resulted in women being able to take courses at St. Michael's College for the first time. In 1931, the school was renamed to “St. Joseph’s College School” when it was moved to a building separate from the convent.

The motherhouse was relocated to Morrow Park on Bayview in 1960.

The school also operated the commercial school on Sherbourne Street for secretarial skills. This school became co-educational and renamed to Thomas Merton Catholic Secondary School in 1985. During 1987, it was ceased as a private school.

On May 31, 2012, the head janitor of SJCS, Vincent Perna, was charged with attempted murder as police alleged Perna went to the staff room and tried to help kitchen staff light a stove after a gas line had been severed in the basement of the school.

== Education ==
St. Joseph's College School offers a full-time Extended French program, a variety of Advanced Placement and enriched courses, and a wide range of classes in the sciences and the humanities. Additionally, the Arts Department offers drama, visual arts, music, and new media arts programming. Drama students, for example, have taken part in the Sears Ontario Drama Festival. St. Joseph's regularly scores within the top 10% of schools on the Education Quality and Accountability Office's standardised tests.

The school also has a Gifted education program and an Enriched program. Through these, students are able to take part in a number of activities, including Encounters With Canada, the University of Toronto Mentorship Program, model United Nations conferences, the Queen's University Enrichment Studies Unit, the University of Toronto Gifted Conference, Canadian Open Mathematics Challenge, and the University of Waterloo's various mathematics competitions.

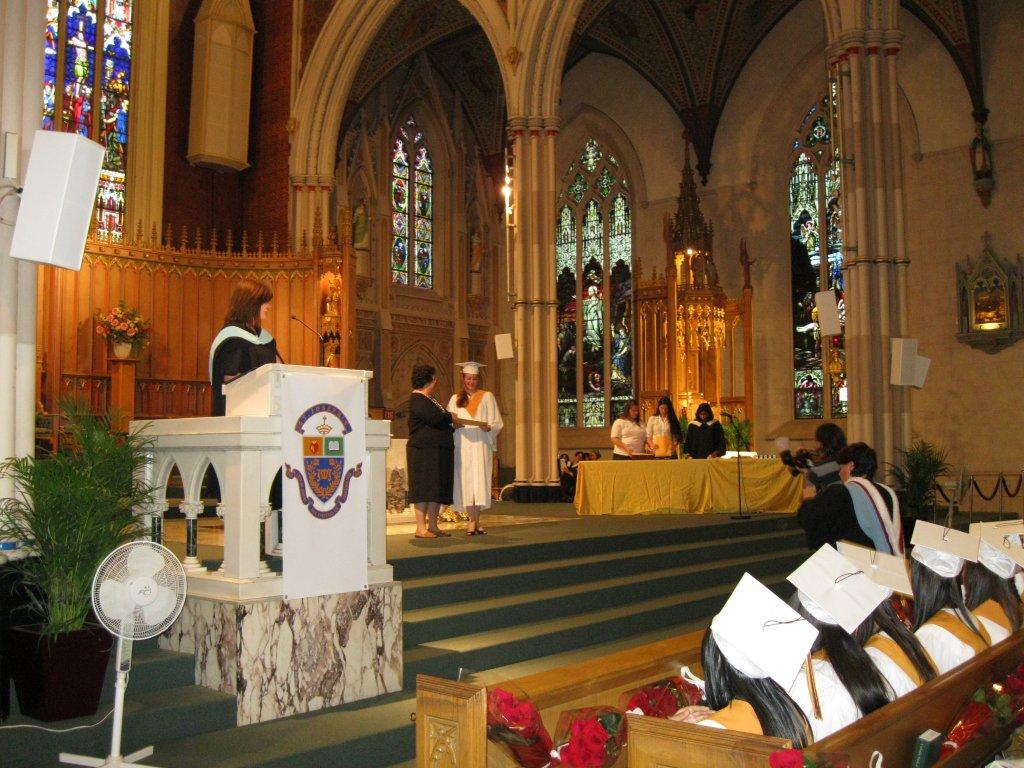
A graduation ceremony at St. Joseph's College School

== Chaplaincy ==
The Chaplaincy program at St. Joseph's College School provides all staff and students experiences of prayer, the sacraments, social action and Catholic leadership. The school chaplaincy team leader and the student chaplaincy team organize the student retreat program, plan all aspects of school liturgies, contribute to the annual Remembrance Day assembly, and facilitate many other school projects.

== Uniform ==
Students at St. Joseph's wear a uniform, which includes a Dress Gordon plaid kilt, a white blouse with the school insignia, and navy cardigans, full-zip sweaters and sweater vests embroidered with the school crest.

== Notable alumnae ==
- Nhooph Al-Areebi - professional wrestler / WWE developmental Diva (as Jasmin Areebi / Aliyah)
- Several Olympians

== See also ==
- Education in Ontario
- List of secondary schools in Ontario
