= SMOC =

SMOC may refer to:

- South Middlesex Opportunities Council, a private social service group in Massachusetts, US
- Saint Mary's Orthodox College, a school in Lebanon
- Self-modifying code, in computing
- Smoke Committee (SmoC), an operating group of the US National Wildfire Coordinating Group
- Standard Mean Ocean Chloride, a measure of Chlorine-37
- Southern Meridional overturning circulation, an ocean current around the Antarctic
