= Jean-Baptiste Teste =

French politician

Jean-Baptiste Teste (20 October 1780, in Bagnols-sur-Cèze, Languedoc – 20 April 1852, in Chaillot, now in Paris) was a French politician of the July Monarchy. He fell from grace in the Teste-Cubières scandal.

== Life ==
=== Early life ===
The son of Antoine Teste, lawyer to the Parliament of Provence, and of his wife Élisabeth Boyer, Jean-Baptiste Teste studied under the Joséphites in Lyon. He distinguished himself early in his education, according to Joseph Marie Portalis, in the "Demosthenic forms" of his oratorical debut (noted by others for his elocution difficulties).

=== Legal career ===
He was received as a lawyer in Paris and at first enrolled at the Paris bar, where he pleaded successfully several times, before returning to set up as a lawyer in Nîmes. Acquiring a great reputation in Nîmes, during the Hundred Days Napoleon made him Lyon's police chief. He was elected on 17 May 1815 as deputy to the Hundred Days Chamber for Gard (50 votes out of 73) but was unable to attend the parliament due to his administrative duties. Proscribed on the Second Restoration, he sought refuge in Liège, where he again practiced as a lawyer until being expelled and forbidden to return for 22 months after defending the anti-Russian and anti-Austrian journal Le Mercure surveillant. During that time he tried to set up again in Paris, but failed since he was refused entry to the Paris bar, and thus after the 22 months stayed on practising in Liège until 1830, building up a large client base.

King William I of the Netherlands charged him with managing the royal lands and estates. He also pleaded for the house of Orléans in a trial with the Rohans about the duchy of Bouillon, merged into the kingdom of the Netherlands in 1814. It was during that trial that he met André Dupin (Dupin aîné), lawyer to the house of Orléans. He was able to return to Paris and re-enrol at the Paris bar after the July Revolution, and soon came to reach the top jobs such as lawyer to the royal lands and to the treasury.

=== Political career ===
In the general elections of 5 July 1831, Jean-Baptiste Teste was elected député by the first electoral college of Gard (Uzès) (217 votes out of 375 voters et 488 inscribed, as against 145 for M. Madier de Montjau). He sat with the liberal Tiers Party of his friend Dupin aîné, and from there hotly defended the new regime. With discretion and skill, he participated most especially in debates on legislation, commerce and public works. He was re-elected on 21 June 1834 (227 votes of 349 voters and 464 inscribed against 111 to M. de Dreux-Brézé) and was made Minister for Commerce and of Public Works, all the while being the interim Minister for National Education and for Cults (i.e. Religion), in the temporary Maret government (10–18 November 1834).

He was then elected vice-president of the Chambre des députés and won re-election on 13 December 1834 (243 votes out of 253 voters and 591 inscribed). He thus voted with the majority but entered into the coalition which, in 1839, led to the fall of Molé's first ministry. He was re-elected as a député on 2 March 1839 (256 of 418 votes) and was made minister for Justice and Cults in Soult's second ministry (12 Mary 1839 to 1 March 1840). He was re-elected as a député on 22 June 1839 (280 of 289 votes). During his time as minister, he formed a committee to look into ways of suppressing bribery in government ministries. Soult appreciated him and made him minister of public works in his third ministry of 29 October 1840. Teste voted for the "grande loi" of 1841 on expropriation for the cause of public use, the law of 1842 on roads, and the law of 1843 on industrial property.

On 16 December 1843, Guizot removed Teste from the ministry but gave him major compensation, including making him a peer of France and head of the Cour de cassation. A member of the royal family even intervened in his favour by requesting the retiring president of the civil chamber to name Teste as his successor. Becoming a grand officer of the Legion of Honour in 1846, he had thus reached the highest honours.

=== The Teste-Cubières scandal ===
The Teste-Cubières scandal erupted in 1847. General Despans-Cubières, temporary Minister for War in 1839 and 1840, in need of money, speculated in various areas, particularly a mining operation. In 1843, to get the concession for a salt mine at Gouhenans renewed, he and his associates bribed Teste (as minister of public works) with 94,000 francs. The affair came out in May 1847 during a trial of Despans-Cubières's associates before the civil tribunal of the Seine. The company director, a certain Parmentier, produced in his defence several letters from general Despans-Cubières mentioning bribes.

The affair received huge publicity and the scandal stuck. King Louis-Philippe of France decided to have the case tried before the Chambre des pairs, and on 8 July 1847, Teste, Despans-Cubières, Parmentier and a certain Pellapra (former receiver-general, who had acted as the general's intermediary to Teste) came before it on corruption charges. It is said the king criticised his chancellor, duc Pasquier, for imprisoning Teste, telling him "What? Haven't you already got enough of my ministers? He will need a second! Also, I've spent 17 years to resurrect France's power, and in one day, in one hour, you have let it fall back down."

Dismissed from all his offices the day before the trial began, Teste began by denying everything before later breaking down, beaten by the evidence brought before the court by Pellapra's ex-wife and by the testimony of the agent de change who had converted the funds into treasury bills. He attempted suicide on 12 July by shooting himself twice in the head and chest with a pistol brought to him by his son, but was only lightly wounded. The following day he refused to present himself before the court since, as he wrote to the chancellor, "the documents produced no longer leave any room for contradiction". On 17 July the Chambre des pairs condemned him to three years in prison, to return the 94,000 franc bribe and to pay a fine of the same amount to the Hospice de Paris. He was incarcerated in the prison du Luxembourg, which he had had built himself, and remained there until 13 August 1849. President Louis-Napoléon Bonaparte then authorised him to spend the rest of his sentence in a nursing home at Chaillot and reduced the fine to be paid to 44,000 francs. He left the nursing home in July 1850 and died two months later.

== Sources ==
- Adolphe Robert et Gaston Cougny, Dictionnaire des Parlementaires français, Paris, Dourloton, 1889
