= Bethany Hill School =

School in Massachusetts, United States

Coordinates: 42.2648°N 71.4309°W

Bethany Hill School is a living and learning community sponsored by the Sisters of Saint Joseph of Boston in collaboration with South Middlesex Opportunities Council and other social service programs in the MetroWest region.

== Overview ==
Bethany Hill School is located on a 100-acre (0.40 km^{2}) semi-rural campus, in Framingham, Massachusetts, near the Ashland town line. The Sisters of St. Joseph rehabilitated their former educational residence in the early 1990s, based on the concept of educational housing which pairs affordable housing to educational and life skills programs.

Programs include financial planning, job prep workshops, parenting skills, youth summer camps, 12-step recovery groups, language literacy classes, computer training and GED classes.

The campus includes a community garden, picnic benches, a playground and basketball courts. In addition to studio and congregate accommodations for about 30 individuals, Bethany Hill School provides ample space for families in its nine four-bedroom and ten two-bedroom apartments. Community spaces for workshops, staff offices, a playroom for children, a laundry room and a computer lab are located on the ground level.

There are between 90 and 100 people who live in 42 apartments on the grounds. The units available are for individuals and families who can benefit for a supportive environment that enables them to live independently and to receive educational services. Every resident is expected to enroll in some sort of educational program. Residents must be committed to an educational endeavor to increase their capacity to live effectively and independently. There are many opportunities for volunteers to help as "Grandsisters", volunteers one hour a week in the children’s room, tutoring, computer assistance, writing resumes, and assisting seasonally with various celebrations.

Residents include persons who are physically or mentally disable, persons who are hearing impaired, single mothers with children, individuals or families who are in recovery, people who are homeless or living in transitional housing. New Beginnings is one program that is a permanent congregate housing program for homeless living with HIV or AIDS.

Its operations are funded by the rent from the 42 apartments, some of which are Section 8 public housing. All residents are assisted with housing costs in one way or another. The education programs are funded through grants.

== History of the building ==
Built in 1927 as a school for the Sisters of Saint Joseph. Later it was used as a novitiate until 1964. From 1971 to 1985 the grounds were used for a school for children with multiple disabilities.

== Awards ==
Bethany Hill School was presented with an award by the MetLife Foundation at the Enterprise Network Conference in Washington, D.C., on November 9, 2005. The School was accorded the 1st Place for Excellence in Affordable Housing in the Property and Asset Manager category along with a $25,000 award. The annual awards program is designed to recognize innovation and leadership in the development and operation of affordable housing by non-profit groups throughout the country.
