= Jeanne Fontbonne =

French religious sister

Personal life
- Born: March 31, 1759 Bas-en-Basset, Forez, Kingdom of France
- Died: November 22, 1843 (aged 84) Lyon, France

Religious life
- Religion: Roman Catholic
- Order: Sisters of Saint Joseph

Jeanne Fontbonne, CSJ (31 March 1759 – 22 November 1843), more commonly known by her name in religion St. John Fontbonne, was a French religious sister. She founded the Sisters of St. Joseph of Lyon in 1808 and served as its first superior general.

== Life ==
Born in Bas-en-Basset, Forez (now in Haute-Loire), on 31 March 1759, Jeanne Fontbonne was the youngest child of Michel and Jeanne Theillère Fontbonne. In 1778 she entered a house of the Sisters of St. Joseph, which had just been established at Monistrol (Haute-Loire) by Bishop de Gallard of Le Puy. The following year she received the religious habit. At the age of 26 she was chosen by the community to be their Superior and remained there until the French Revolution. She and her sisters established a hospital

At the outbreak of the French Revolution she and her community followed Bishop de Gallard in refusing to sign the Oath of Civil Constitution of the Clergy. Forced to disperse her community, she remained until she was forced to leave, and the convent taken possession of by the Commune. She returned to her father's home, and was soon imprisoned for 11 months at Saint-Didier and only the fall of Robespierre on the day before that appointed for the execution saved her from the guillotine. Unable to regain possession of her convent at Monistrol, she and her sister, who had been her companion in prison, returned again to their father's house, where she and a few companions continued their charitable works among the poor.

In 1807, Fontbonne was called to Saint-Étienne to assume responsibility for Les Filles Noire, a group of 12 young women and members of dispersed congregations. At the request of Cardinal Joseph Fesch, Archbishop of Lyon, and under Fontbonne's formation, these women became the first Sisters of St. Joseph of Lyon. She restored the asylum at Monistrol and eventually managed to repurchase and reopen the former convent. On 10 April 1812, the congregation received government authorization. In 1816, Fontbonne was appointed Superior General of the Sisters of St. Joseph of Lyon. She went to Lyon to find and purchase property to build a motherhouse and novitiate on rue des Chartreux.

Before the Revolution, small groups of Sisters lived close to the people, wearing ordinary dress, they visited the homes of people who were sick and poor and helped all in need. The government required a different model, centralized into diocesan congregations focused on education. By 1830, the Sisters were wearing an official habit for the first time.

During her years of leadership, she established and reorganized pre-revolutionary communities to become satellites of the Motherhouse. By the end of her leadership, she was responsible for establishing a number of new congregations in France and Italy as well as over 240 communities of the Lyon congregation. In 1836 at the request of Bishop Rosati of the Diocese of St. Louis in Missouri, she sent six sisters to America. She kept in constant correspondence with them. This began the expansion of numerous congregations of the Sisters of St. Joseph in the United States and Canada.

She died on 22 November 1843 in Lyon.

== Legacy ==
The Sisters of St. Joseph commemorate Fontbonne on November 22. Fontbonne College, now Fontbonne University, in Saint Louis is named in her honor.
