= South Middlesex Opportunities Council =

US social organization

South Middlesex Opportunities Council, commonly referred to as SMOC, is one of the largest private, non-profit social services groups in Eastern Massachusetts. Operating in the Metrowest region of the state, the group provides homeless shelters, drug rehabilitation programs, family counseling handicapped transportation and numerous other social services. It was founded in 1966.

== Programs ==
- Joan Brack Adult Learning Center GED classes for adults who do not have a high school diploma. Receives financial support from the Brack Family Foundation and Middlesex Savings Bank.
- Larry's Place' A respite for homeless veterans in Framingham. Provides services to help military veterans with substance abuse, mental health counseling and job skills.
- New Beginnings A permanent congregate housing program for homeless living with HIV or AIDS. located at the Bethany Hill School in Framingham
- Pathways Family Shelter is a fourteen family congregate shelter for homeless families.
- Sage House is a shelter providing substance abuse treatment and supportive services for seven homeless families
- Serenity House Residential long-term treatment program for 20-30 women with HIV/AIDS and for pregnant/postpartum women located in Hopkinton. Includes residential beds for clients' children.
- Turning Point program An 18-bed emergency shelter for single adult men.
- Voices Against Violence A program in Framingham for domestic violence victims.
- The Wright Home for Women A 16-bed shelter for single adult women. Residents are required to engage in an intensive, comprehensive program designed to assist participants over a nine- to twelve-month period work to achieve the goal of economic self-sufficiency. The property is a drug and alcohol-free environment located in Easthampton
