= Sisters of St. Joseph =

Female Catholic religious congregation

- Established: c. 1650
- Founder: Jean-Pierre Médaille
- Founded at: Le Puy-en-Velay, France
- Purpose: To live and work so that all people may be united with God and with one another.
- Locations: France; Italy; US; UK; Canada; Japan; India
- Members: approx. 9,500
- Parent organization: Catholic Church
- Website: cssjfed.org

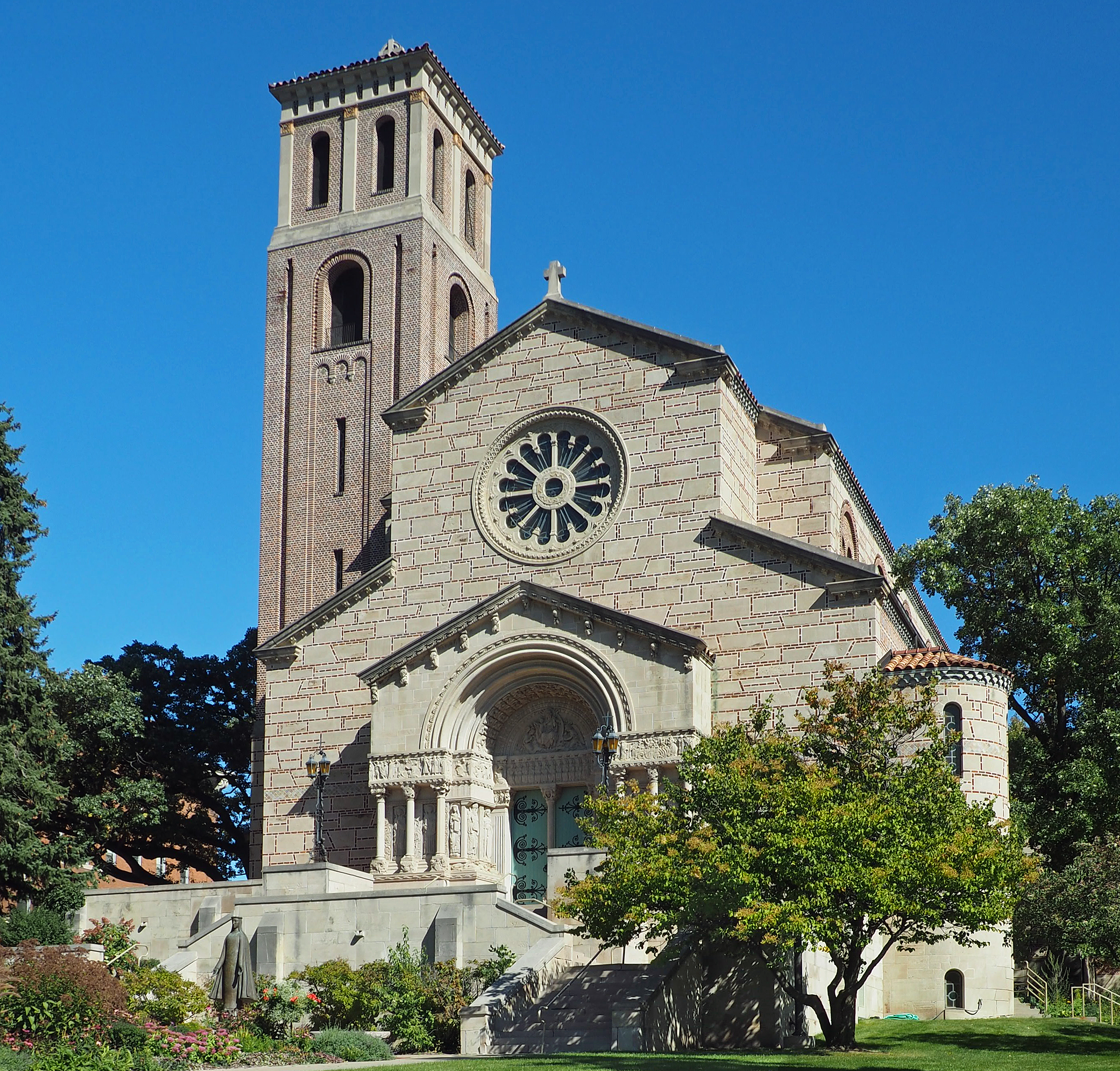
Our Lady of Victory Chapel, St. Catherine University in Saint Paul, Minnesota.

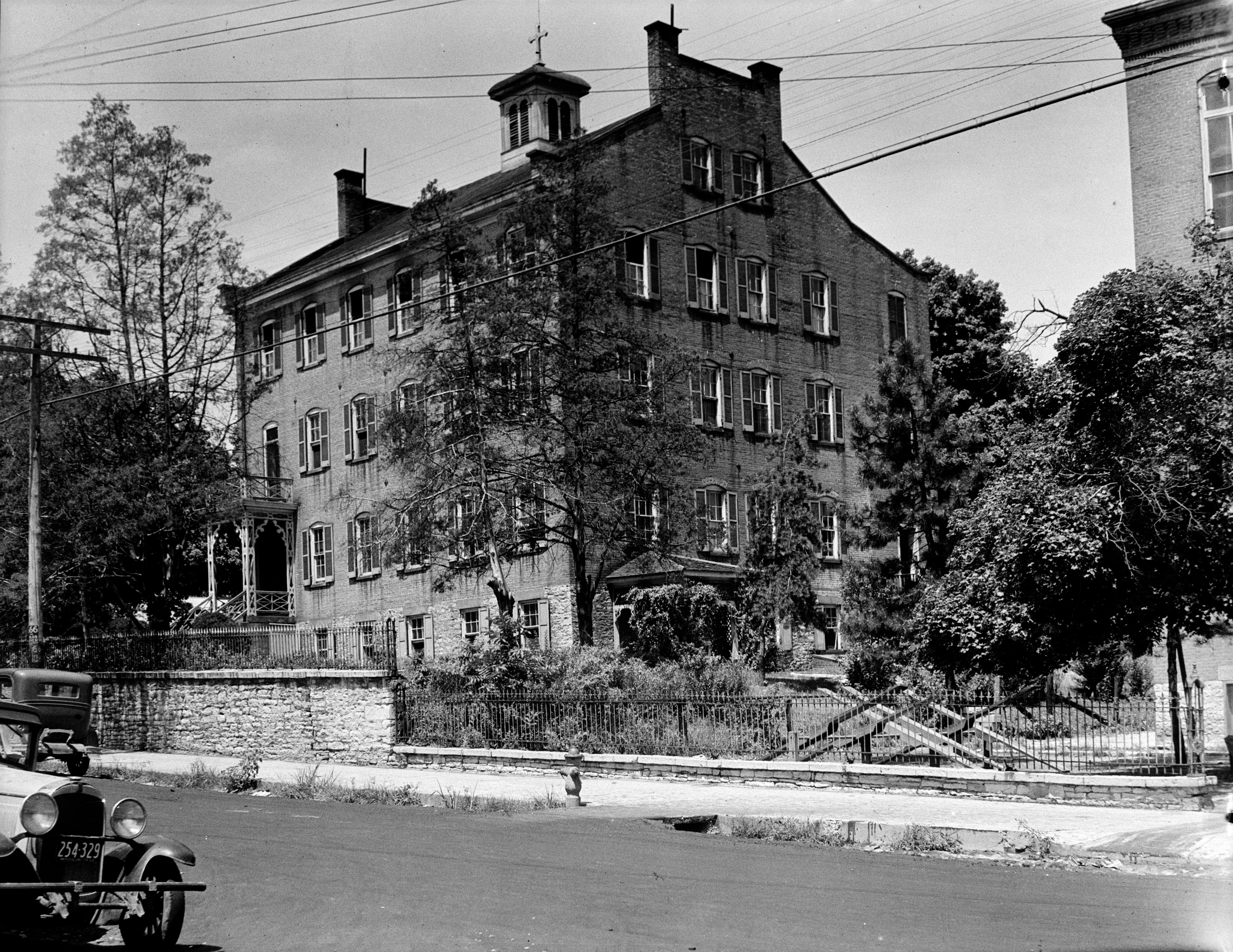
An old convent of the Sisters of St. Joseph in Ste. Geneviève, Missouri.

The Sisters of St. Joseph, also known as the Congregation of the Sisters of St. Joseph, abbreviated CSJ or SSJ, is a Catholic religious congregation of women founded in Le Puy-en-Velay, France, in 1650 by Jean-Pierre Médaille. This congregation, named for Saint Joseph, has approximately 9,500 members worldwide: 2,584 in the United States; 2,000 in France; and are active in 50 other countries.

== Composition ==
The Sisters of Saint Joseph comprise three international congregations (Lyon, Chambéry, and Annecy) and four federations (French, Italian, US, and Canadian), representing more than 9,500 Sisters worldwide.

== Congregation of the Sisters of St. Joseph of Lyon ==
The Congregation of the Sisters of St Joseph of Lyon number nearly 1,000, serving in four provinces (Maine, Mexico, India and Europe) in fifteen countries. The Sisters operate many Catholic schools and hospitals in France, the United States, Canada, Japan and England. In India, they operate hospitals, homes, and orphanages.

=== Foundation ===
The Congregation of the Sisters of St. Joseph was founded by Jean-Pierre Médaille (although older accounts attribute this to his brother, Jean Paul). Medaille sought to establish an ecclesiastically approved congregation of women who would profess simple vows, live in a small group, with no specific apostolates and would dress in a common garb of the women of their day. The original six sisters were Anna Brun, an orphan; Marguerite Burdier; war widow, Claudia Chastel; Anna Chaleyer; Anna Vey, age 15; and Françoise Eyraud, a hospital administrator, served as superior of the new community for 30 years. The Bishop of LePuy, France, Henri de Maupas gave the foundation canonical status. Although the Congregation celebrates October 15, 1650 as its beginning, there is evidence that points to an earlier founding, more likely between 1646 and 1650. All the women made ribbon and lace that gave them some income to support themselves. In turn they taught others to make lace and ribbon.

The new Congregation enjoyed rapid growth, expanding into eighteen houses during the first decade. By the time of the French Revolution, almost 150 years later, the Sisters had spread to twelve dioceses in the southeast corner of France. The Congregation of Saint Joseph was disbanded during the French Revolution. The convents and chapels of the community were confiscated in 1793. The Sisters were forced to choose between returning to their families or leaving France to join communities in other countries. Some Sisters who remained became martyrs. Three in Dauphiné and two in Haute-Loire were sent to the guillotine because they refused to take the Civil Oath. Others were imprisoned at St-Didier, Feurs and Clermont.

=== Post-Revolutionary France ===
The congregation was re-established in 1807 by Jeanne Fontbonne in Lyon, France. As word of the Sisters' services and good deeds grew, dioceses throughout France requested the services of the restored Congregation. Houses were established in the dioceses of Lyon, Chambéry, Annecy, Gap, Bourg, and Bordeaux.

In 1902 many French houses of the congregation were closed by the Government, in consequence of which a large number of Sisters left for Denmark, Russia and the United States. In 1996 the Congregation of the Sisters of St. Joseph of Bourg re-joined the Sisters of St. Joseph of Lyon as part of the latter's European Province.

==== Sisters of Saint Joseph of Chambery ====
The center of the Congregation is in Rome. Other Provinces and Regions are located in Belgium, Bolivia, Brazil, Czech Republic, Denmark, France, Germany, Ireland, India, Italy, Mozambique, Norway, Pakistan, Sweden and Tanzania. The order has approximately 1,800 sisters in 18 countries.

In 1812 a colony of Sisters of St. Joseph was sent from Lyon to Chambéry, in Savoy, France under Mother St. John Marcoux. She in turn sent sisters to Turin and to Pignerole in the Piedmont, thus giving rise to new branches of Saint Joseph sisters. In 1843 Mother Félicité became Mother Superior. More than eighty houses rose under her direction, and when, in 1861, a state normal school was opened at Rumilly, Savoy, France. it was placed in charge of the sisters. Meanwhile, the Chambéry sisters had been constituted a diocesan congregation, but as years went on a stronger administration became necessary.

The rule was therefore revised to meet the requirements of a generalate, and papal approbation was granted in 1874 by rescript of Pius IX. Under the new form of government the congregation is subject to a Superior General, whose term of office is six years and is divided into provinces, each possessing a novitiate. The novices, after two years probation, make annual vows for two years, after which they bind themselves by perpetual vows. The rule is based on that of St. Augustine.

==== Congregation of the Sisters of St. Joseph of Bourg ====
In 1819 a foundation from the motherhouse in Lyon was established in the Diocese of Belley under the leadership of Mother Saint Joseph Chaney. In 1823 the Sisters of that diocese formally separated from community in Lyon. They became a new and independent diocesan congregation under the leadership of Reverend Mother Saint Benoit Cornillon and the authority of Bishop Alexander Devie. Several other foundations spread from France throughout the world. In 1996 the Bourg congregation merged with the founding congregation of Lyon, as part of the latter's European Province.

==== Congregation of the Sisters of St. Joseph of Annecy ====
The Congregation of the Sisters of St. Joseph of Annecy is an international congregation of about 500 sisters serving in the Congo, England, France, Gambia, India, Ireland, Senegal, Switzerland, Tanzania and Wales.

After the French Revolution, the Congregation was revived by Mother St.John Fontbonne, on 14 July 1808. As Superior General, she undertook the consolidation and expansion of the Congregation to other parts of France. In response to a request from Bishop Rey who had previously worked with them in Pignerol, five Sisters arrived in Annecy on 7 May 1833. The new Congregation grew and developed, and their first mission in India was established in 1849. A provincial house and novitiate are located in Visakhapatnam (once known as Waltair), Andhra Pradesh. In 1891, a school was established to help educate the children of the Roman Catholic families based in Visakhapatnam. The school which was named, St Joseph's Girls High School continues to operate to this day, and is the second oldest school in Visakhapatnam. It is one of the oldest institutions set up exclusively for girls in India.

In the summer of 1864, two Sisters of St Joseph of Annecy set out on a voyage from India to the UK to open a community in the small town of Devizes, Wiltshire, England. In 1946, Llantarnam Abbey in Wales was bought by the Sisters of St. Joseph and is home to a large community of Sisters. The Sisters farm the adjoining land. Llantarnam Abbey in Cwmbran, South Wales stands on the site of a medieval Cistercian monastery. The Tŷ Croeso ecumenical retreat center adjoins the Abbey. There are eight houses in the United Kingdom, under the provincial house and novitiate at Llantarnam Abbey. The congregation now numbers 60, in charge of 10 elementary day and boarding-schools, with an attendance of about 2000. In Scotland at St Mary's College, Blairs, 15 sisters have charge of the household arrangements and work of the college.

In 1950, the congregation bought Tredegar House, Newport, from the Hon. John Morgan, who was disposing of his family seat in lieu of death-duties. The sisters ran the house as a convent and latterly comprehensive school until 1974, when it was sold to Newport County Council.

On March 19, 2015, the Bhubaneswar Province of the Sisters of St. Joseph of Annecy opened St. Joseph's Hospital in the city of Agartala, Tripura, India.

== US Federation of the Sisters of Saint Joseph ==
In 1966 the Federation of the Sisters of Saint Joseph was created as a union of all the Sisters of Saint Joseph of the United States who claim a common origin in the foundation at LePuy, France in 1650. It includes approximately 2,584 members of 16 Congregations throughout the United States. In addition there are 2,797 associates.

Member congregations are:

=== Sisters of St. Joseph of Philadelphia ===
In 1847 the Sisters of St. Joseph of Carondelet, in response to an appeal of Bishop Francis Kenrick, sent four members of the community to Philadelphia to take charge of St. John's Orphan Asylum, until that time under the Sisters of Charity. The Know-Nothing spirit, which had but a short time previously led to the Philadelphia riots was still rampant, and the sisters had much to suffer from bigotry and difficulties of many kinds. Shortly afterwards they were given charge of several parochial schools, and thus entered on what was to be their chief work in the coming years.

In October 1858, under the patronage of St. John Neumann, the congregation in Philadelphia began to take a more definite development by the establishment of a mother-house at Mount St. Joseph, Chestnut Hill. When the Sisters of St. Joseph of St. Louis formed a generalate in 1863 (approved later by the Holy See), the congregation of Philadelphia preserved its autonomy, by the wish of the bishop. When the number of religious members increased to between three and four hundred, and the works entrusted to them became so numerous and varied as to necessitate an organization more detailed and definite, steps were undertaken to obtain the papal approbation, which was received in 1895.

During the Civil War, detachments of sisters nursed the sick soldiers in Camp Curtin and the Church Hospital, Harrisburg. Despite anti-Catholic sentiments from doctors and soldier-nurses who did not appreciate the sisters' presence, the sisters worked at the camp until its closure in April 1864. Shortly after, under Surgeon General Smith, they undertook more active duty on the floating hospital, Whilldin, which received the wounded from both sides at the battle of Yorktown, and other southern battle-fields.

For two thirds of the 1900s, the group supplied teachers to hundreds of elementary and secondary schools in the Philadelphia area, educating generations of children and young adults. The trademark white triangle that was worn as part of the sisters' veil was present until 1974. The changes in lifestyle and ministry that were common in Catholic religious institutes of women in the late 1960s took a little longer to catch up with this group who held on to convent living in traditional parish settings as well as a modified habit and veil up to the mid-1980s.

From a membership high of close to 2,500 in the mid-sixties, the current 2022 membership is approximately 500 with most of the membership in full or partial retirement.

Sisters of St. Joseph of Philadelphia sponsored institutions: Saint Joseph Academy McSherrystown, Pennsylvania; Mount Saint Joseph Academy (Flourtown, Pennsylvania); Saint Joseph Villa; Saint Mary By-The-Sea Retreat House in Cape May Point, New Jersey; Norwood-Fontbonne Academy; Holy Family Academy (Bayonne, New Jersey); SSJ Center for Spirituality Chestnut Hill, Philadelphia; Bethlehem Retirement Village, Flourtown, Pennsylvania; Sisters of Saint Joseph Welcome Center, Philadelphia (Kensington), PA; and Chestnut Hill College, in Chestnut Hill, Pennsylvania

=== Sisters of St. Joseph, Brentwood, New York ===
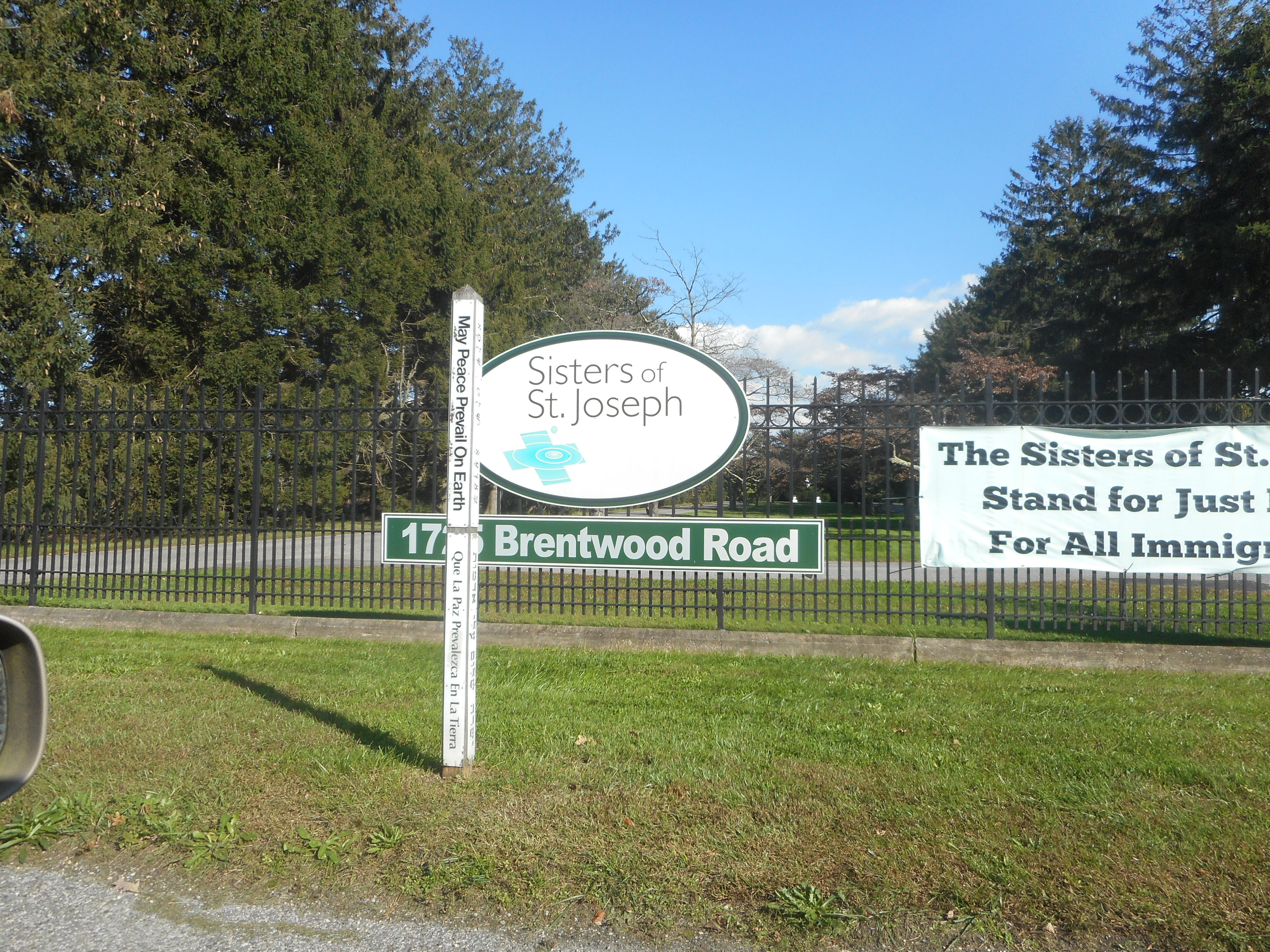
Gate to the Sisters of St. Joseph Motherhouse in Brentwood, New York.

The Sisters of St. Joseph, Brentwood is an independent diocesan congregation. In the spring of 1856 the Right Rev. John Loughlin, first Bishop of Brooklyn, applied to the mother-house at Philadelphia for sisters, and two religious were named for the new mission, joined during the same year by a sister from Buffalo. St. Mary's Academy, Williamsburg, was opened on September 8, 1856, and in the following year a parochial school was inaugurated. In 1860 the mother-house, novitiate, and boarding school were removed to Flushing, Long Island, whence the activity of the sisters was gradually extended over the diocese. In 1903 the mother-house and novitiate were again transferred to Brentwood, New York, where an academy was opened the same year.

Sisters of St. Joseph, Brentwood sponsor, among other ministries: Saint Joseph's College (New York), St. Joseph High School (Brooklyn), The Mary Louis Academy, Fontbonne Hall Academy, Sacred Heart Academy (New York), Bishop Kearney High School (New York City), Academia Maria Reina and Maria Regina Residence, a skilled nursing facility.

=== Sisters of St. Joseph of Baden, Pennsylvania ===
In 1869 the Sisters of St. Joseph, Brentwood, (then located in Flushing, New York) sent three pioneer sisters to Ebensburg, Pennsylvania: Sisters Hortense Tello, Xavier Phelan, and Sister Austin Keane, a native of nearby Loretto, Pennsylvania, who had been baptized by Father Demetrius Gallitzin, the pioneering priest in western Pennsylvania. Five days after their arrival in Ebensburg, the three St. Joseph Sisters opened a day-school and a boarding-school, Mount Gallitzin Seminary for Boys.

In 1902 a four-story school and convent to serve as both Mt. Gallitzin Academy and their new motherhouse was dedicated in Baden. Their original motherhouse in Ebensburg was remodeled into an infant home where they nurtured newborns and toddlers from 1923 to 1959.

From 1926 to 1948, 15 Sisters of St. Joseph of Baden ministered in China. Their mission in Hunan Province included an orphanage and hospital. Sister Theresa Joseph Lung, a native of Hunan who entered the congregation in 1933, remained in China after the sisters left and died there in 1994. The community has sheltered refugees from Cuba, Haiti, Vietnam, Cambodia, Laos, Bosnia, and Kosovo, and has been instrumental in helping them find homes in this country. In 1997, the sisters started Girls they established a separate non-profit corporation to operate Villa St. Joseph, a non-sectarian, 120-bed, long-term care facility with a specialized unit for Alzheimer's patients.

The Sisters of St. Joseph of Baden number just under 200 women. They are chaplains, foster parents, and pastoral ministers; they include a lawyer, drug and alcohol interventionists, counselors, retreat directors, and college professors.

=== Sisters of St. Joseph of Boston ===
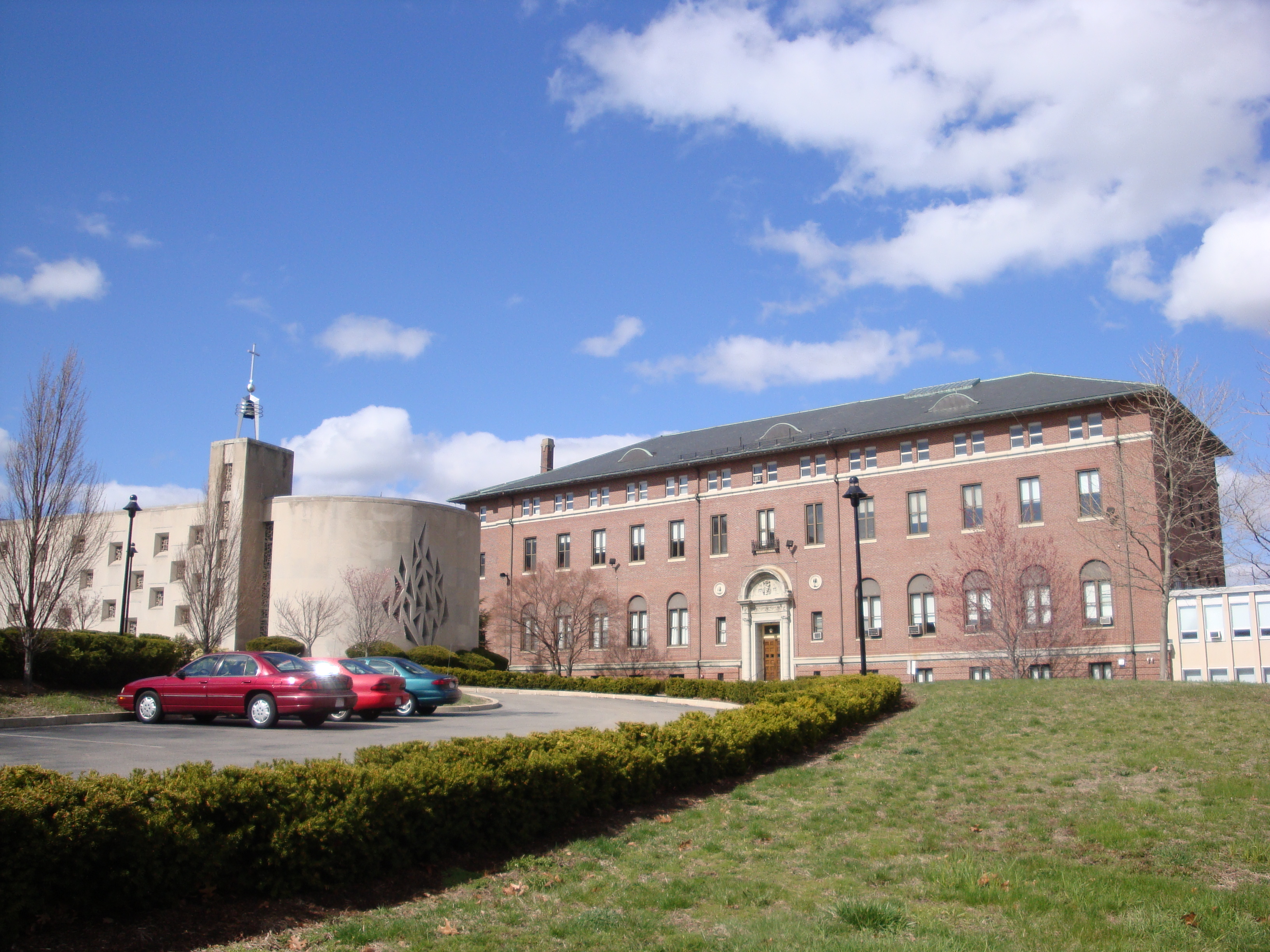
Sisters of St Joseph Convent Allston-Brighton

In 1873 four Sisters of St. Joseph of Brooklyn (now Brentwood) arrived at St. Thomas parish in Jamaica Plain. They found a city filled with new immigrants from Southern and Eastern Europe who had joined the earlier Irish immigrants. Four days after their arrival the sisters opened an elementary school for girls in the basement of the church. 200 students applied the first day. By 1877, with the acceptance of 30 boys, St. Thomas School became the first co-educational Catholic school in New England. In the Archdiocese of Boston, the sisters opened, staffed, and/or sponsored over 125 educational institutions, including schools for children with special needs.

Sisters of St. Joseph, Sister John Berchmans and Sister Elizabeth, were among those who volunteered to care for people during the influenza epidemic of 1918. During the Depression, they fed the hungry from their kitchen doors. In the 1950s, four Sisters of St. Joseph of Boston were missioned to New Mexico to teach in parish schools. Since that time sisters have ministered in Santa Rosa, Santa Fe, Albuquerque, Clovis, and Springer, New Mexico. San Ricardo Parish in Lima, Peru, became the home to a group of Sisters of St. Joseph of Boston in 1965.

The Sisters of St. Joseph of Boston sponsor: Bethany Health Care Center and Bethany Hill School, both in Framingham, Massachusetts; Fontbonne, the Early College of Boston in Milton, MA; Jackson School and Walnut Park Montessori School in Newton, MA; Saint Joseph Preparatory High School and Literacy Connection Literacy Connection in Brighton, MA; Regis College in Weston, MA; and Casserly House in Roslindale, MA;

The mother-house is in Brighton.

=== Sisters of St. Joseph of Buffalo ===
The Sisters of St. Joseph were introduced into the Diocese of Buffalo in 1854, when three sisters from Carondelet, St. Louis, made a foundation at Canandaigua, New York. Two years later one of these sisters was brought to Buffalo by Bishop Timon to assume charge of Le Couteulx St. Mary's Institution for the instruction of deaf mutes, which had lately been established. The novitiate was removed from Canandaigua to Buffalo in 1861. The community developed rapidly and soon spread through different parts of the diocese. By 1868 the sisters were sufficiently strong to direct their own affairs, and elected their own superior, thus forming a new diocesan congregation. In 1891 the mother-house and novitiate were removed to the outskirts of the city, where an academy was erected.

Sisters of St. Joseph of Buffalo sponsor Mount Saint Joseph Academy in Buffalo.

=== Sisters of St. Joseph of Rochester, New York ===
In 1854 four Sisters of St. Joseph came from St. Louis, at the invitation of Bishop Timon of Buffalo, to Canandaigua, New York. In 1868, the Diocese of Rochester was created, and the community divided creating 2 communities, one in Buffalo and the other in Rochester, now with its own mother-house and novitiate at St. Mary's Boys' Orphan Asylum, later transferred to the Nazareth Academy, Rochester.

The Sisters of St. Joseph of Rochester sponsor Nazareth Schools; St. Joseph's Neighborhood Center; Daystar; the Sisters of Saint Joseph Volunteer Corps; St. Joseph's Northside Outreach and Prayer Ministry; and a volunteer program.

=== Sisters of St. Joseph of Northwestern Pennsylvania (Erie) ===
The Sisters of St. Joseph of Erie were founded in 1860 by Mother Agnes Spencer of Carondelet, Missouri, who, with two other sisters, took charge of St. Ann's Academy at Corsica, Pennsylvania, where postulants were admitted. In 1864 a hospital was opened at Meadville, and the sisters took charge of the parochial schools of that city. Villa Maria Academy was opened in 1892 and in 1897 was made the novitiate and mother house of the Sisters of St. Joseph in the Erie diocese.

Among the sisters ministries are: Villa Maria Elementary School, Villa Maria Academy, Bethany House Ministry, The Heritage Apartments, Saint Vincent Health Center, Saint Mary's Home of Erie, SSJ Neighborhood Network, St. Patrick Haven, St. James Haven, and Faithkeepers Trail

=== Sisters of St. Joseph of Watertown, New York ===
In 1880 several sisters from the mother-house at Buffalo made a foundation at Watertown, New York, which was later strengthened by the accession of another sister from the Erie mother-house. Sister M. Josephine Donnelly, formerly of the Sisters of St. Joseph of Erie, is considered by some to be the foundress of the Sisters of St. Joseph of Watertown as she remained when other sisters moved on to start a foundation in Michigan. From Watertown as a center, missions were opened in other parts of the diocese.

=== Sisters of St. Joseph of Concordia, Kansas ===
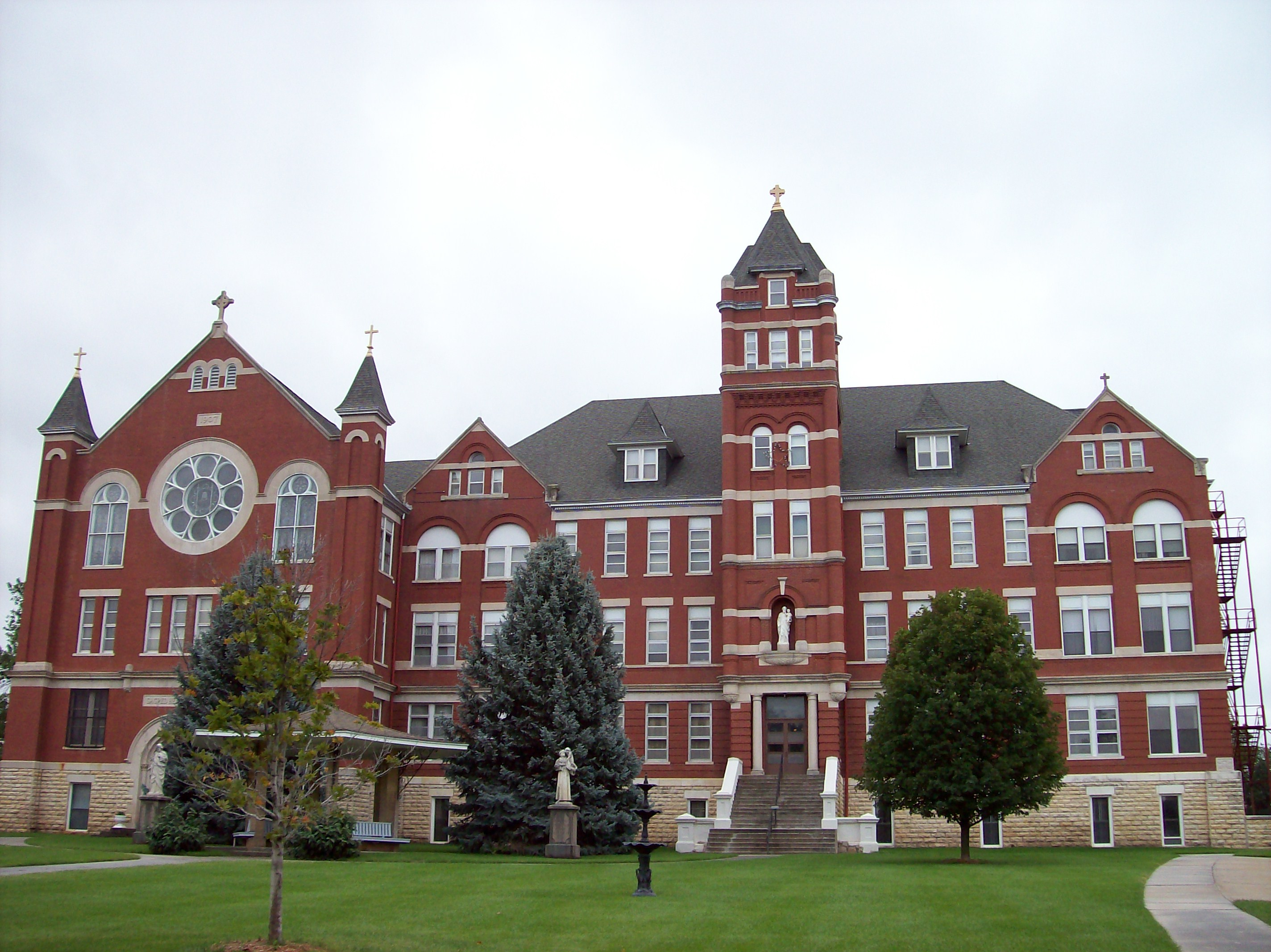
Nazareth Convent and Academy in Concordia, Kansas, in 2007

In 1883 four Sisters of St. Joseph arrived at Newton, Kansas, from Rochester, New York, and opened their first mission. After remaining there a year they located at Concordia, Kansas, in the fall of 1884, and established the first motherhouse in the West, in what was then the Diocese of Leavenworth. The congregation has hospitals and schools in the Archdiocese of Chicago and the Dioceses of Marquette, Rockford, Kansas City, Omaha, Lincoln, and Concordia. The sisters currently so work in Brazil and New Mexico. Diocese of Concordia is now Diocese of Salina

The Sisters of St. Joseph of Concordia sponsor Nazareth Convent and Academy, Manna House; and From 1922 to 1989 the sisters also operated Marymount College.

=== Sisters of Saint Joseph of Chambery, West Hartford, Connecticut ===
After the French Revolution, the community revived under the leadership of Jeanne Fontbonne. The order grew and branched out. One of these branches became the Sisters of St. Joseph of Chambéry, founded in 1812 in the town of Chambéry in south-eastern France. Jane Sedgwick of Stockbridge, Massachusetts, desired to establish a Catholic school in Lee, Massachusetts. Since there weren't enough sisters in the United States to aid in the running of the school, Jane eventually went to Rome to appeal to Pope Leo XIII to send help. In 1885, five sisters of Saint Joseph of Chambéry arrived in Lee to open the school. The novitiate was transferred to Hartford, Connecticut in 1898. The foundation spread into Connecticut and eventually into other parts of the United States.

=== Congregation of Saint Joseph ===
In 2007, seven congregations of the Sisters of Saint Joseph in the central United States merged to form an entirely new congregation, which is now called the Congregation of Saint Joseph. The Congregation numbered about 700 as of 2011.

==== Sisters of Saint Joseph of Medaille ====
In 1854 Sisters were sent from the Sisters of St. Joseph of Bourg house in France to establish a house at Bay St. Louis, Mississippi, in the Diocese of Natchez. In 1863 a novitiate was opened at New Orleans. After establishing a central house in New Orleans, Louisiana, the Sisters extended their ministry to the poor and suffering of Louisiana and Mississippi, opening schools, hospitals and an orphanage. Schools were subsequently opened among the French Canadians in Minnesota and Wisconsin.

By 1962, the Bourg Congregation had six provinces, three in Europe and three in the United States, with missions in Africa and Latin America. In July 1977, the six provinces voted to become two separate congregations, one based in Europe, the other in America. On November 30, 1977, Rome officially declared the three American provinces to be a new Congregation in the Church: the Sisters of Saint Joseph of Medaille. The name Medaille was chosen because it is the family name of the Jesuit priest who helped found the Sisters in 1650 and because the Sisters were geographically located in the north, central and southern areas of the United States.

==== Sisters of St. Joseph of Cleveland ====
The Sisters of St. Joseph of the Diocese of Cleveland are chiefly engaged in the parochial schools. The sisters currently support St. Joseph Academy in Cleveland, Ohio; River's Edge, Women's Outreach Center, Seeds of Literacy, WellSpring Bookstore and the CSJ Prayer Line.

==== Sisters of St. Joseph of La Grange, Illinois ====
The Sisters of St. Joseph were established in La Grange, Illinois, October 9, 1899, by two Sisters under Mother Stanislaus Leary, formerly superior of the diocesan community at Rochester, New York. On July 14, 1900, the cornerstone of the mother-house was laid. Currently the sisters sponsor Nazareth Academy, a Catholic co-educational high school in La Grange Park, Illinois.

Among the ministries sponsored by Sisters of St. Joseph of La Grange are the School on Wheels, Nazareth Academy, Ministry of the Arts, and Christ in the Wilderness

==== Sisters of St. Joseph of Nazareth, Michigan ====
In 1889 Sisters of St. Joseph from the Diocese of Ogdensburg, New York established a new congregation at Kalamazoo, Michigan. The founding sisters came to Kalamazoo at the request of the Diocese of Detroit and Msgr. Francis O'Brien for the purpose of establishing a hospital, later named Borgess Hospital. At about the same time these first sisters, under the leadership of Mother Margaret Mary Lacy, began an orphanage and a school in addition to establishing their motherhouse at Nazareth on the outskirts of the city of Kalamazoo. The novitiate was transferred, in 1897, to Nazareth, a hamlet founded by the Sisters on a 400-acre (1.6 km^{2}) farm.

Among the institutions sponsored by the Sisters of St. Joseph of Nazareth are the Dillon Complex for Independent Living, Transformations Spirituality Center, Ascension Health and Our Lady of Guadalupe Middle School for Girls.

==== Sisters of St. Joseph of Tipton, Indiana ====
The Sisters of St. Joseph of Tipton were founded in 1888 by Gertrude Moffitt at St. John the Baptist Parish in Tipton, Indiana. The sisters worked as teachers in a number of parish schools; opened and staffed St. Joseph Academy from 1892 until its closure in 1972; sponsored Good Samaritan Hospital and St. Joseph Hospital in Kokomo, Indiana (previously Howard County Hospital, now St. Vincent Kokomo Hospital), and started the Hospice St. Joseph mission in Port-au-Prince, Haiti (now administered by the Diocese of Norwich, CT.)

In 2007, the Tipton community joined with six other communities to form the Congregation of St. Joseph. In 2016, the property owned by the Sisters in Tipton was sold to the Diocese, which now operates the St. Joseph Retreat and conference Center. The few remaining sisters moved to other locations of the Congregation of St. Joseph.

==== Sisters of St. Joseph of Wheeling, West Virginia ====
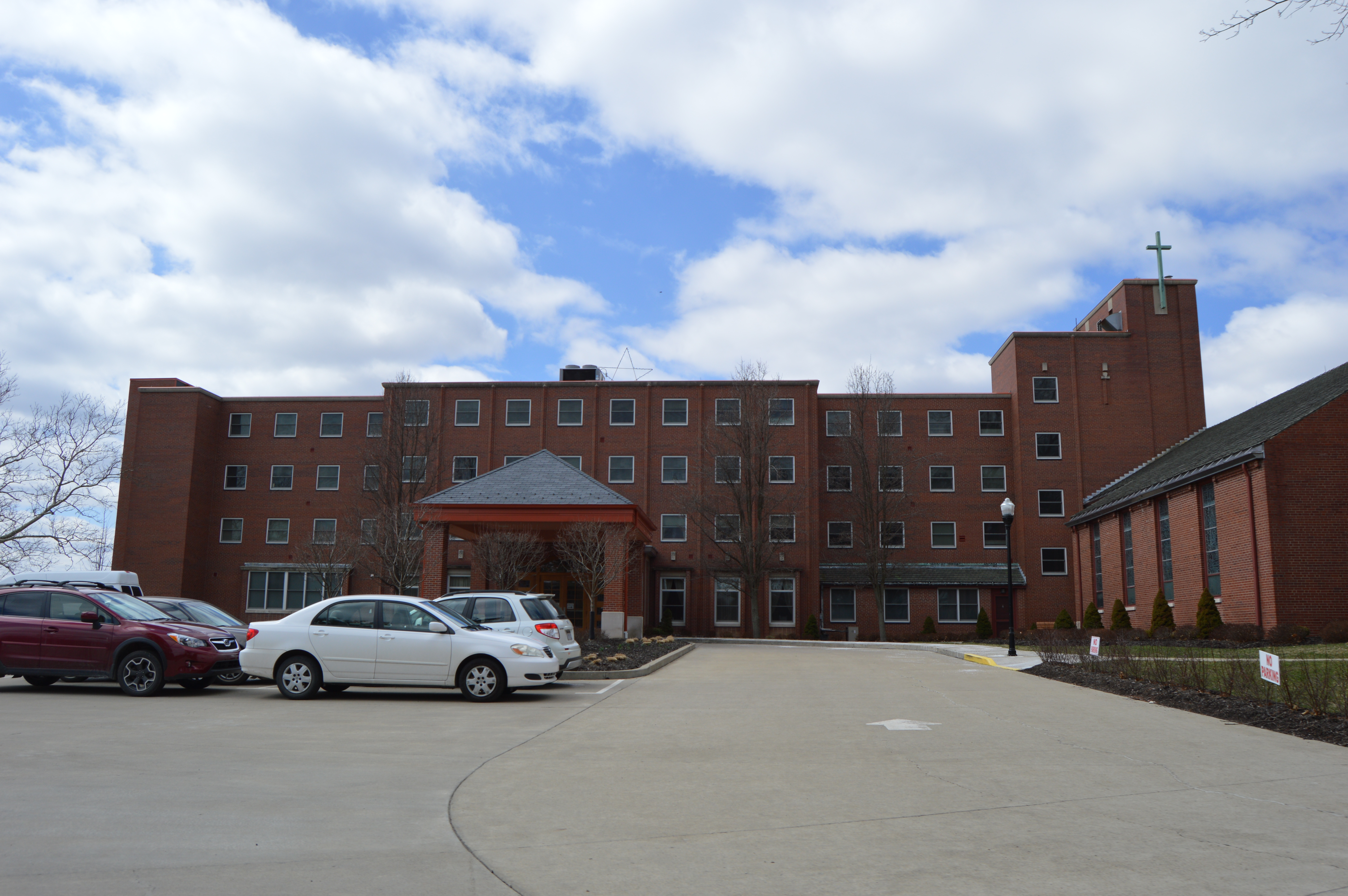
Motherhouse in Ohio County, West Virginia

In 1853 seven sisters from Carondelet, Missouri, opened a private orphanage and hospital in Wheeling, and in 1856 took possession of a building chartered by the Assembly of Virginia for a hospital. From 19 October 1860, the community was independent of the St. Louis mother-house. During the Civil War the hospital was rented by the Government and the sisters enrolled in government service. After the war and the reorganization of the hospital on its present lines, the sisters extended their activities to various parts of the diocese.

The motherhouse was included in the Mount Saint Joseph listing on the National Register of Historic Places, added in 2008.

The Sisters of St. Joseph of Wheeling sponsor the SSJ Health and Wellness Foundation, the SSJ Charitable Fund and a variety of programs under Holy Family Child Care & Development.

==== Sisters of St. Joseph of Wichita, Kansas ====
In 1883, Mother Stanislaus Leary of Rochester, New York stopped in Kansas en route to Arizona, and opened a mission which would develop into the Sisters of St. Joseph of Concordia. In August 1887, four Sisters of St. Joseph were commissioned to go from Concordia, Kansas, to open a parochial school at Abilene, Kansas, at that time in the Roman Catholic Diocese of Leavenworth. In the fall of 1887, word was received from Rome that the state of Kansas had been divided into dioceses. At the direction of Bishop Fink, who did not wish to lose the sisters from his diocese, the Abilene sisters constituted themselves a separate congregation with an act of incorporation of March 25, 1888. The following year the Right Rev. L. M. Pink, Bishop of Leavenworth, decided that these Sisters should belong to his diocese exclusively, and in so doing they became the nucleus of a new diocesan congregation of the Sisters of St. Joseph, having their motherhouse established at Abilene, under the title of Mount St. Joseph's Academy.

The congregation increased in numbers and soon branched out, doing parochial school work throughout the diocese. In 1892 the name of the Diocese of Leavenworth was changed to Kansas City, Kansas, and for the time being the Sisters of St. Joseph were diocesan Sisters of the Roman Catholic Diocese of Kansas City. In 1896, when the re-division of the three Kansas dioceses, was begun, Bishop Fink of Kansas City, had their motherhouse transferred from Abilene to Parsons. But after the division was made the following year, Parsons was in the Wichita diocese, and the mother-house of the Sisters of St. Joseph being in Parsons, the congregation belonged to the Wichita Diocese, having mission-houses in both the Diocese of Concordia and the Diocese of Kansas City. In 1907 a colony of these Sisters opened a sanitarium at Del Norte, Colorado, in the Diocese of Denver.

In 1950, the congregation responded to the need for medical services in Kyoto, Japan. Three sisters began a mission which today sponsors a kindergarten, day nursery, medical services for senior citizens, a disabled children's hospital, and a special education school.

When the sisters relocated to a new motherhouse in 2018, the previous one was initially taken over by Saint Francis Ministries, an Episcopal child and family services ministry, to house teenage girls aging out of foster care, and also a Head Start Program. After COVID and realignment with Saint Francis Ministries led to their vacating of the 1916 building, it was demolished in 2024. Reference: https://amp.kansas.com/news/business/biz-columns-blogs/carrie-rengers/article288459985.html

=== Sisters of St. Joseph of St. Augustine, Florida ===
At the close of the American Civil War, Augustin Verot, Bishop of Savannah and Administrator Apostolic of Florida, visited his native city of Le Puy where he challenged the Sisters of St. Joseph to come to St. Augustine. Many sisters volunteered. The chosen eight were Sister Marie Sidonie Rascle, Superior: and Sisters Marie Julie Roussel, Marie Josephine Deleage, Marie Clemence Freycenon, St. Pierre Borie, Marie Joseph Cortial, Julie Clotilde Arsac, and Marie Celenie Joubert. They arrived in Florida at Picolata Landing on the shores of the St. Johns River, September 2, 1866.

The sisters from France adjusted heroically to a different language, culture, and climate with joy and faith. They welcomed new members as they mourned the disproportionate number of those who succumbed to disease and unhealthy conditions. At the direction of Bishop Verot, the sisters were sent to six missions throughout Florida and Georgia. Their primary ministry was to black people. Owing to the departure of the Sisters of Mercy from the city, the education of the whites also devolved on the new community.

By 1876 the sisters in Georgia had been separated from those in France, but the sisters in Florida were established as a province of LePuy. At the close of the century, provincial government was abruptly terminated by Bishop John Moore. This brought about the establishment of the Diocesan Congregation of the Sisters of Saint Joseph of St. Augustine, Florida, in 1899. To maintain their charitable works and to provide self-support, the sisters erected academies. These institutions served as centers of catechetical work until they were relinquished and replaced by parochial and diocesan schools. The sisters augmented their resources by such means as lace-making and private lessons in art, music, and language.

During the years of rapid expansion in the developing Church of Florida, and with the support of Archbishop Joseph P. Hurley, the majority of the sisters gave their time to education, which included instruction of students who were deaf, blind, developmentally disabled, or otherwise handicapped. Gradually they became more involved in the multi-faceted aspects of health care; and they assumed work with the aging, unwed mothers, and migrants. The Congregation opened schools in Puerto Rico in the fifties. Two decades later in 1976, the sisters in Puerto Rico became an independent institute.

=== Sisters of St. Joseph of Orange (California) ===
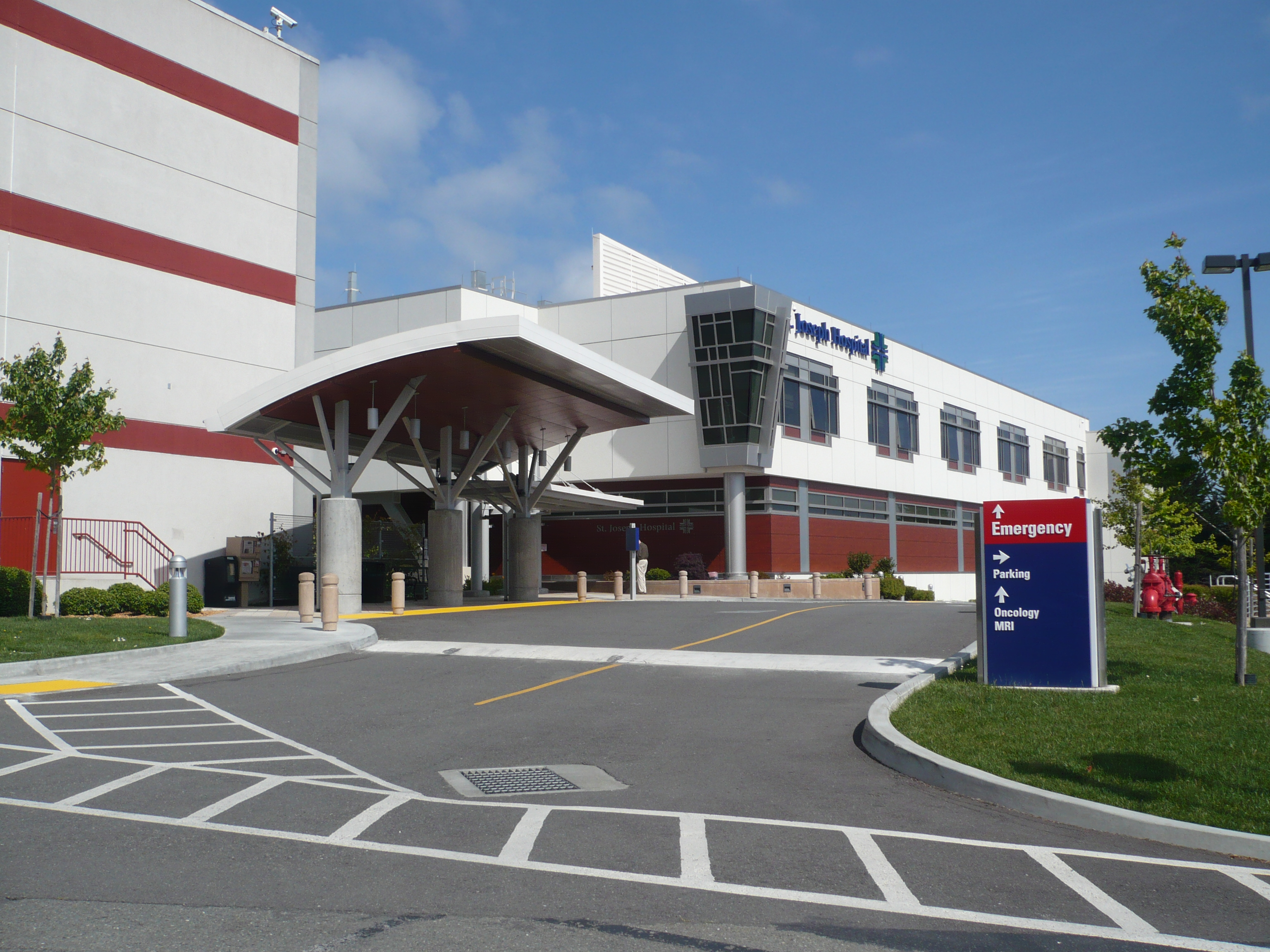
St. Joseph Hospital, Eureka, California

The Sisters of St. Joseph of Orange is among the youngest of the American congregations and traces its roots through the St. Joseph congregations of La Grange, Illinois; Concordia, Kansas; Rochester, New York; and Carondelet, Missouri.

The Sisters of St. Joseph of Orange were established in 1912 by Mother Bernard Gosselin. She and eight sisters left LaGrange, Illinois, near Chicago to establish what is now St. Bernard's High School in Eureka, California. As the Congregation grew, the Sisters were better able to address more of the needs of the area. The 1918 flu pandemic presented a new challenge to the community. The Sisters responded as best they could at the time, but they realized that by establishing a hospital they could provide a health care service which would effectively address the personal, social and spiritual needs of the area. In 1920, the Sisters opened St. Joseph Hospital in Eureka. Today the hospital is by far the largest medical facility on Coastal California north of its even larger medical facility located in Santa Rosa, California, as well as others in Southern California.

By 1922, the Sisters were teaching in several Southern California areas and recognized that the community could better develop its ministries by moving the Motherhouse to Orange. The first ministries of the Sisters of St. Joseph of Orange were in education and health care. Schools and hospitals were staffed primarily by the Sisters and in the 1940s and 1950s the number of institutions directed by the Congregation increased steadily. In the 1940s the Sisters extended their work in health, education and religious instruction to the people of Papua New Guinea and Australia.

Today, the Congregation's commitment to education is expressed in a variety of forms including elementary, secondary, university and other adult education. The commitment to extend their healing mission is expressed through acute care hospitals, rehabilitation programs, home health care, community education, primary care clinics, and wellness programs. The works of the Congregation have expanded, however, beyond education and health care to also include such things as helping new immigrants, feeding the hungry, giving shelter to the homeless, and fostering spiritual development.

The Sisters of St. Joseph of Orange are one of three sponsoring religious communities of Loyola Marymount University in Los Angeles. They also have a special partnership with the Western American Province of the Religious of the Sacred Heart of Mary dating back to the 1968 signing of the Marymount Accords when St. Joseph's College of Orange merged with Marymount College of Los Angeles and assumed the Marymount name. Five years later, Marymount College merged with Loyola University of Los Angeles as the school assumed its current name, Loyola Marymount University.

Sisters of St. Joseph of Orange sponsor the following institutions: École Notre-Dame-des-Victoires, San Francisco; Loyola Marymount University, Los Angeles; Mission Hospital, Mission Viejo; Queen of the Valley Medical Center, Napa; St. Jude Medical Center, Fullerton; and Rosary High School, Fullerton (1965–1976).

=== Sisters of St. Joseph of Lyon, Winslow, Maine ===
In 1906 Father Joseph Forest requested of the Sisters of St. Joseph to come to the Diocese of Portland, Maine. With the bishop's approval, eight Sisters made their way to Maine where they would staff a parochial school and a girls' boarding school in Jackman. The need was for bilingual teachers and none of the Sisters were familiar with English. They made haste to learn words and expressions so they could communicate with the children. At the time of their arrival, there were approximately 80 families in Jackman, mostly of Canadian origin so they spoke French. Children came from miles around, even from Canada, to be educated by the Sisters. Many of the children went home only at the end of the school year because of transportation and harsh weather. A second group of Sisters came into Maine in 1909, this time in South Berwick. The site of the convent was the former Paul's Hotel, where Lafayette had stayed on one of his trips to the United States. The Sisters became known primarily for their education apostolate in the diocese.

The Sisters in Maine maintained their link with the Motherhouse in Lyon, France through frequent correspondence as well as the regular canonical visits from the Mother General or one of her assistants. Only in 1958, as the number of Sisters increased sufficiently to establish a Province in Maine did the Congregation appoint a provincial superior.

=== Sisters of St. Joseph of Springfield (Massachusetts) ===
In September 1880, seven Sisters of St. Joseph were sent from Flushing, Long Island, to take charge of a parochial school at Chicopee Falls, Massachusetts. They were followed, two years later, by seven Sisters for Webster, and in 1883 by twelve more for the cathedral parish school in Springfield. In 1885 the Springfield mission was constituted the motherhouse of an independent diocesan congregation.

Among the ministries sponsored by the Sisters of St. Joseph of Springfield are Mont Marie Child Care Center, Mont Marie Health Care Center, Inc, Mont Marie Senior Residence, and Mont Marie Labyrinth.

As of 2015, there were about 250 Sisters the Springfield Congregation continuing to serve through a variety of ministries.

==== Sisters of St. Joseph of Fall River (Massachusetts) ====
In 1902 nine Sisters of St. Joseph from the mother-house at Le Puy took charge of the school in the French parish of St-Roch, Fall River, Massachusetts. The accession of other members from the mother-house enabled the community to take charge of three other schools in the city attached to French parishes. In 1906 St. Theresa's Convent was formally opened as the provincial house of the community, which was legally incorporated in the same year, and a novitiate was established. In the mid 1970s, the Sisters of St. Joseph of Fall River merged with the Springfield Congregation.

In later years the Sisters ran a Montessori school, St. Joseph Montessori, from their convent atop Townsend Hill, across from the former Blessed Sacrament church. The convent was built in the mid-1950s and closed in the 1990s, replaced with Atlantis Charter School. The school eventually merged with St. George's School in Westport to form the Montessori School of the Angels, which has since itself closed.

==== Sisters of St. Joseph of Rutland, Vermont ====
In 1873 the Rev. Charles Boylan of Rutland (town), Vermont petitioned the mother-house of the Sisters of St. Joseph at Flushing, Long Island, for sisters to take charge of his school. Several sisters were sent, and a novitiate was opened at Rutland on October 15, 1876. The Sisters of Saint Joseph founded Mount Saint Joseph Academy. In 2001, Sisters of St. Joseph of Rutland, Vermont joined the Springfield community which also covers Worcester, the Berkshires, Rhode Island and even Louisiana and Uganda.

== Federation of the Sisters of Saint Joseph of Canada ==
On September 20, 1966, the six separate Canadian congregations: Toronto, Hamilton, London, Peterborough, Pembroke and Sault Ste. Marie, formed the Canadian Federation.

=== Sisters of St. Joseph of Toronto ===
The mother house of the Sisters of St. Joseph at Toronto was established from Le Puy, France, in 1851 by Mother Delphine Fontbonne and three other Sisters of St. Joseph of Philadelphia. They took charge of an already established orphanage at 100 Nelson Street (now Jarvis). The city was filled with Irish immigrants who had fled the ravages of famine at home, and the sisters attended to the needs of orphans, widows and people who were sick and dying.

For many years, the mother house was at Morrow Park in north Toronto. The sisters taught in many schools across Canada. In Toronto, some of their schools included: St. Joseph's Morrow Park Catholic Secondary School, St. Joseph's College School, St. Joseph's Islington, and St. Joseph's Commercial as well as St. John. They also established St. Michael's Hospital and St. Joseph's Hospital, and for many years ran the Sacred Heart Orphanage and the House of Providence for poor persons, among many other charities. In higher education, the sisters established St. Joseph's College in the University of St. Michael's College.

Their current mother house is on O'Connor Drive in Toronto, and their works continue under the mantle of Fontbonne Ministries.

=== Congregation of the Sisters of St. Joseph in Canada ===
In 2012, four congregations (Hamilton, London, Peterborough and Pembroke) decided to come together to form a new congregation – The Congregation of the Sisters of St. Joseph in Canada. The amalgamation to form one charitable corporation received Royal Assent on June 13m 2013 through the Congregation of the Sisters of St. Joseph in Canada Act, a Private Act of the Legislative Assembly of Ontario.

==== Sisters of St. Joseph of Hamilton (Ontario) ====
The first Sisters of St. Joseph in Canada came to Toronto from the Sisters of St. Joseph of Philadelphia, in the fall of 1851. In 1852 five sisters from the mother-house at Toronto established a foundation at Hamilton, where they at once opened St. Mary's Orphanage and began their work in the parochial schools of the city. During the 1854 cholera epidemic, (followed by an outbreak of typhus), the sisters were placed in charge of caring for the ill immigrants housed in railway sheds. On the erection of the Diocese of Hamilton in 1856, the community became a separate diocesan congregation, and a few months later a novitiate was established at Hamilton. Mother Martha von Bunning was the first General Superior. By the passage of the Separate Schools Bill in 1856 the sisters were given control of the education of the Catholic children of the city. The congregation gradually extended its activities to other parts of the diocese.

The sisters became heavily involved in health care. They founded St. Joseph's Hospital and School of Nursing, Guelph; House of Providence, Guelph; St. Joseph's Hospital and School of Nursing, Hamilton; House of Providence, Dundas; Casa Maria Maternity Hospital, Hamilton; St. Mary's Hospital and School of Nursing, Kitchener; St. Joseph's Hospital, Brantford; St. Joseph's Training Centre for Registered Nursing Assistants, Brantford; St. Joseph's Home, Guelph; and St. Joseph's Community Health Centre, Stoney Creek and in 1991 the establishment of the St. Joseph's Health System. In 1963, following Vatican II, the sisters went to Teculután, Guatemala where they provided health care and education. They also ministered in Nicaragua.

The Neighbour to Neighbour Program, St. Joseph's Women's Immigrant Centre, and Hamilton Out of the Cold are but three more recent (25 years) local initiatives where the Sisters have been instrumental in the start-up. They also operated Bethany House, Hamilton and Martha House, Hamilton. Both were homes for abused women.

In 2019, there were fewer than twenty sisters living at the Motherhouse in Hamilton. It was sold to Columbia International College. The sisters are expected to maintain a small amount of office space. Some have moved to other motherhouses, and the rest to a Burlington retirement villa.

==== Sisters of St. Joseph of London ====
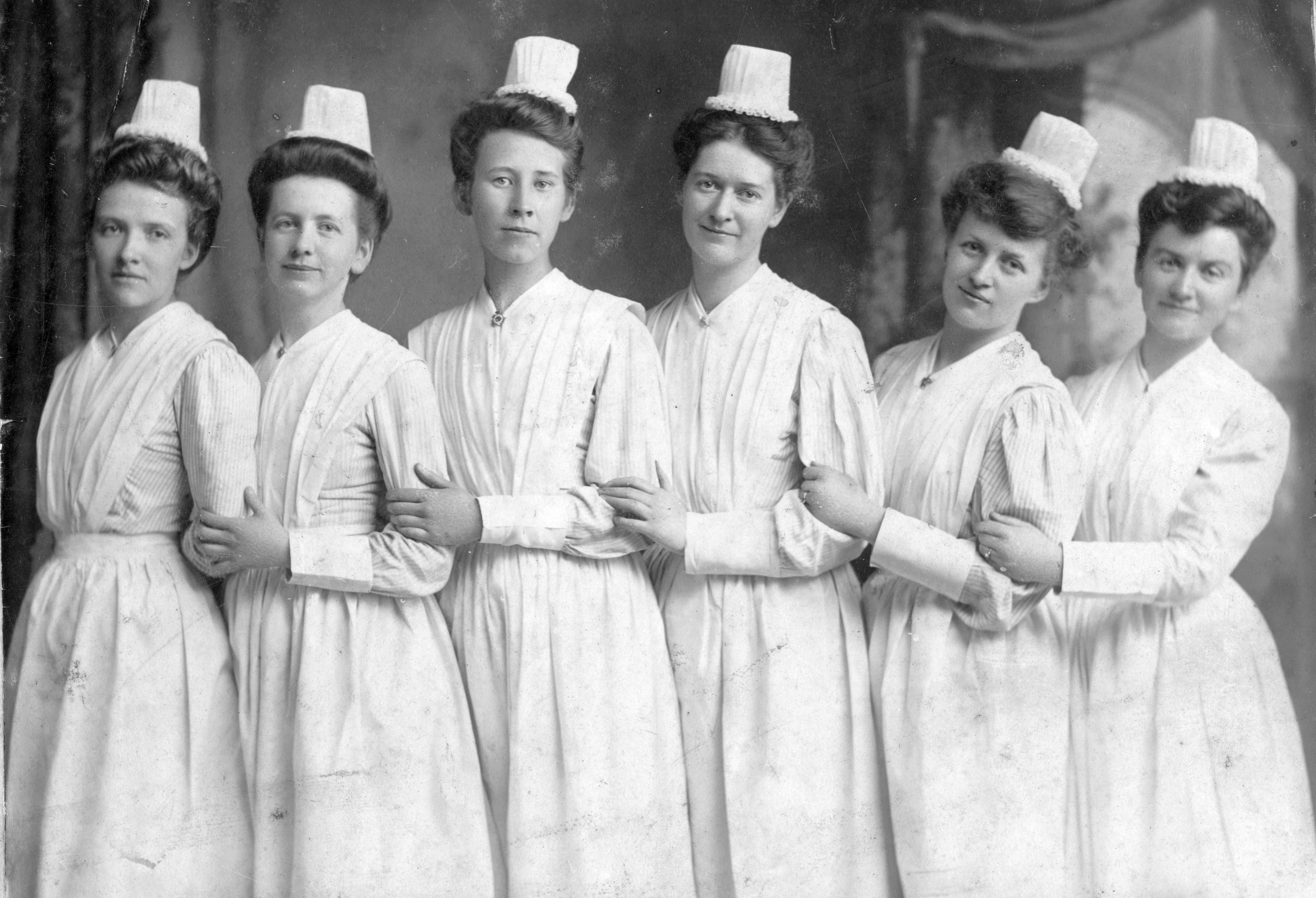
Class that entered St. Joseph's School of Nursing in London, Ontario in 1901. There were eight graduates in this class.

The community of Sisters of St. Joseph at London was founded in 1868 by five sisters from the Sisters of St. Joseph of Toronto. These sisters opened an orphan asylum the following year in 1867. On 18 December 1870, the congregation became independent, with a novitiate of its own. Sister Ignatia Campbell was appointed Superior General in 1870 and held office until 1902. On 15 February 1871, the Sisters of St. Joseph of London, Ontario, were legally incorporated. Several missions were opened in various parts of the diocese, and in 1888 a hospital was established at London, to which was attached a training school for nurses.

==== Sisters of St. Joseph of Peterborough ====
In 1890, at the request of Bishop R.A. O'Connor, Bishop of Peterborough, twenty sisters of the Toronto congregation formed a new congregation in the diocese of Peterborough. Mother Austin Doran was elected General Superior. The sisters staffed the newly opened St. Joseph's Hospital in Peterborough. In 1895 the congregation began its teaching apostolate in the city of Peterborough. A House of Providence was established in 1900 to accommodate not only the elderly poor but orphans of the diocese. In 2012, there were eighty sisters in the Peterborough community.

==== Sisters of St. Joseph of Pembroke ====
In 1921, in response to a request from Bishop Ryan for teachers to staff the rural areas of the Ottawa Valley schools, twenty-seven Sisters of St. Joseph of Peterborough from three mission houses located in the diocese of Pembroke, formed into a new congregation with the motherhouse in Pembroke. In 1946, they opened their first hospitals and Homes for the Aged in western Canada. By 1964, they were able to establish a mission in Peru which is still operating today with a growing community of Peruvian Sisters. The Sisters of St. Joseph of Pembroke sponsor the Stillpoint House of Prayer In January 2020, the Pembroke convent was for sale and the eight remaining sisters preparing to move to a local retirement residence.

=== Sisters of St. Joseph of Sault Ste. Marie ===
In 1936, 121 Sisters of St. Joseph of Peterborough became founding members of the new congregation in the diocese of Sault Ste. Marie. Bishop Ralph Hubert Dignan was heavily involved in the early years of the community, even appointing a temporary General Council until the election of their own leadership in 1937. The sisters' ministries extended across the Diocese of Sault Ste. Marie, including North Bay, Sudbury, Sault Ste.Marie, Port Arthur, and Fort William.

== Federation of the Sisters of Saint Joseph of Italy ==
- Sisters of Saint Joseph of Aosta
- Sisters of Saint Joseph of Chambéry*
- Sisters of Saint Joseph of Cuneo: The Congregation was founded in Cuneo October 10, 1831, through the work of Canon John Manassero, prior and pastor of the Cathedral. The sisters devoted their efforts to the education of poor girls, orphans and the care of sick people in their homes. In particular, they lent their generous service as nurses in the "lazareto" during the cholera epidemic, which leads to death about a tenth of the population. Sister St. John, after just three days of activities was struck by the disease and gave her life.
- Sisters of Saint Joseph of Pinerolo
- Institute Sisters of Saint Joseph:In 2006 three congregations, Novara, Susa, and Turin joined to become a new congregation, the Institute Sisters of Saint Joseph.
  - Sisters of Saint Joseph of Novara
  - Sisters of Saint Joseph of Susa
  - Sisters of Saint Joseph of Turin

== Other foundations ==
The Sisters of St. Joseph of Saint-Vallier were instituted in 1683 at Saint-Vallier, France, when Jean-Baptiste de La Croix de Chevrières de Saint-Vallier, who would later become the second bishop of Quebec, invited some sisters from Le-Puy-en-Velay. The sisters took charge of the small hospital in Saint-Vallier. The congregation survived the French Revolution because of its small size and state of destitution. But the Combes Laws (1901 and 1904) closed the schools of the religious communities and forbade the sisters from teaching. One sister who had come from Quebec, Thérèse de Jésus (Cécile Drolet), suggested to the Mother General that the congregation find a new home in Canada. She was sent to Quebec City in April 1903 and presented a request to Archbishop Louis-Nazaire Bégin, who approved the congregation's move to his diocese.

== Notable members ==
- Sister Helen Margaret Feeney – first woman Chancellor of the Archdiocese of Hartford; inducted into the Connecticut Women's Hall of Fame.
- Mother St. John Fontbonne, helped to refound the Sisters after the French Revolution; was to be executed with her sister, but saved.
- Byrd Gibbens – historian and professor, left the order in 1977
- Sister Elizabeth Johnson – theologian, scholar, author of Quest for the Living God
- Sister Karen Klimczak – active in prison ministry; the SSJ Sister Karen Klimczak Center for Nonviolence was dedicated to her memory.
- Sister Ellen Leonard, author and theologian.
- Sister Joan Lescinski, Professor of English and 13th President of St. Ambrose University.
- Sister Sue Mosteller, author, speaker and first international L'Arche coordinator
- Sister Carol Anne O'Marie, author of a series of mystery novels.
- Sister Helen Prejean, spiritual adviser to men on Death Row and author of Dead Man Walking
- Sister Christine Schenk, founder of FutureChurch and author of Crispina and Her Sisters: Women and Authority in Early Christianity (Fortress 2017).

== See also ==
- Nuns of the Battlefield
- Servants of St. Joseph
- Sisters of St Joseph of the Sacred Heart
- The Sisters of St. Joseph of Peace
