= Jean Paul Médaille =

Jean Paul Médaille, SJ (29 January 1618 – 15 May 1689) was a French Jesuit missionary.

== Jean Paul Médaille ==
Jean Paul Médaille was born on 29 January 1618 at Carcassonne, Department of Aude, France. He entered the Society of Jesus on 15 August 1640, and after completing his studies spent a number of years in the classroom, teaching both the lower and higher studies of the college courses and particularly, for the space of six years, philosophy.

Later he was applied to preaching, his life's work; to this he gave himself up almost exclusively for eighteen years, until advancing age forced him instead to take up directing sodalities and hearing confessions.

He was one of the number of missioners formed in the school of St. Francis Regis of the Society of Jesus, and spent years in the evangelization of Velay, Auvergne, Languedoc, and Aveyron.

According to the Encyclopedia of Canada, on 15 October 1650, Medaille introduced the first Sisters of St. Joseph to the Bishop of Le Puy. While the Catholic Encyclopedia (1911) and the Encyclopedia of Canada attribute the founding of the Sisters of St. Joseph to Médaille, other sources identify his older brother Jean Pierre Médaille (1610-1669) as founder of the order.

Médaille died at Auch in 1689.

== Jean-Pierre Médaille ==
Jean-Pierre Médaille was born in Carcassonne, France on 6 October 1610 to Phelippe d’Estévéril and Jean Médaille. His father was King Louis XIII’s lawyer. The family lived in fairly comfortable circumstances and were deeply religious. He had two brothers: Jean-Paul, born in 1618, who later became a Jesuit missionary, and Jean, who inherited his father’s position and became a prominent attorney.

At age 13, Jean Pierre attended classes at the newly founded Jesuit College in Carcassonne. Shortly before his 16th birthday he entered the Society of Jesus in Toulouse, where he met St. Jean-Francois Regis. He taught for a while in Carcassonne before returning to Toulouse to study theology. He was ordained in 1637 at the age of 27. Fr. Jean-Pierre served as Assistant to the Rector of the Jesuit College in Aurillac before returning to Toulouse, where he met Father Noël Chabanel, S.J. shared this year of spiritual renewal and enrichment with him. Father Noël was missioned to Canada at the end of this year. Noel was later killed while on assignment and is one of the Canadian Martyrs.

In 1645, Father Jean-Pierre was assigned to preach parish missions. It was during these missionary tours that he encountered several young single women and widows who confided in him their desire to consecrate their lives to God and the service of the people in need while living in the world.

In Le Puy-en-Velay, the Saint-Joseph hospice for orphans and widows was under the authority of Bishop Henri de Maupas. He had been a friend of Saints Vincent de Paul and Francis de Sales. Both of them had founded congregations of women engaging in apostolic works outside the cloister (a requirement for women religious at the time). Fr. Jean-Pierre approached the Bishop with a plan for women who wished to combine holiness of life with apostolic activity, and the Bishop responded favourably. Fr. Jean-Pierre founded the Congregation of the Sisters of St. Joseph in Le Puy, France, a congregation of nuns who should give themselves up wholly and unreservedly to all the spiritual and corporal works of mercy. The design of the congregation was based on the spirituality of the Society of Jesus. Bishop de Maupas, officially accepted the Congregation of the Sisters of St. Joseph giving them canonical status and the habit on 15 October 1650.

== Legacy ==
Sacred Heart High School in Vineland, New Jersey, was founded by the Sisters of St. Joseph, and presents a "Jean Paul Medaille Award" in honor of their founder. Medaille University in Buffalo, New York, was named after him. Medaille University closed on August 31, 2023.
